= 2025 NCAA Division I Outdoor Track and Field Championships =

College track and field competition

- Dates: June 11–14, 2025
- Host city: Eugene, Oregon; University of Oregon
- Venue: Hayward Field
- Events: 42 (21 men's and 21 women's)

The 2025 NCAA Division I Outdoor Track and Field Championships were the 103rd NCAA Division I Men's Outdoor Track and Field Championships and the 43rd NCAA Division I Women's Outdoor Track and Field Championships held at Hayward Field in Eugene, Oregon on the campus of the University of Oregon. 42 events (21 men's and 21 women's) were contested from Wednesday, June 11 until Saturday, June 14, starting with the men's decathlon and ending with the women's 4 × 400-meter relay. Men's events were held Wednesday and Friday, and women's events were held Thursday and Saturday, with the exception of the men's decathlon which extended from Wednesday into Thursday and the women's heptathlon which began Friday and ended Saturday.

== Streaming and television coverage ==
ESPN streamed coverage on ESPN2, ESPN3, and ESPNU.

== Results ==
=== Men ===
==== 100 meters ====
Placings in the men's 100 meters at the 2025 NCAA Division I Outdoor Track and Field Championships
Rank	Athlete	Nationality	Team	Time	Notes
1st place, gold medalist(s)	Jordan Anthony	United States	Arkansas Razorbacks	10.07	
2nd place, silver medalist(s)	Max Thomas	United States	USC Trojans	10.10 [.091]	
3rd place, bronze medalist(s)	Jelani Watkins	United States	LSU Tigers	10.10 [.092]	
4	Kanyinsola Ajayi	Nigeria	Auburn Tigers	10.13	
5	Davonte Howell	Cayman Islands	Tennessee Volunteers	10.17 [.166]	
6	Jaiden Reid	Cayman Islands	LSU Tigers	10.17 [.170]	
7	Israel Okon Sunday	Nigeria	Auburn Tigers	10.18	
8	T'Mars McCallum	United States	Tennessee Volunteers	10.24	
9	Eddie Osei-Nketia	New Zealand	USC Trojans	10.30	
				Wind: (+0.7 m/s)	

==== 200 meters ====
Placings in the men's 200 meters at the 2025 NCAA Division I Outdoor Track and Field Championships
Rank	Athlete	Nationality	Team	Time	Notes
1st place, gold medalist(s)	Carli Makarawu	Zimbabwe	Kentucky Wildcats	19.84	PB
2nd place, silver medalist(s)	Makanakaishe Charamba	Zimbabwe	Auburn Tigers	19.92	
3rd place, bronze medalist(s)	Garrett Kaalund	United States	USC Trojans	19.96	
4	Jordan Anthony	United States	Arkansas Razorbacks	20.01	
5	T'Mars McCallum	United States	Tennessee Volunteers	20.16	
6	Max Thomas	United States	USC Trojans	20.23	
7	Xavier Butler	United States	Texas Longhorns	20.39	
8	Abdul-Rasheed Saminu	Ghana	South Florida Bulls	20.55	
9	Cameron Miller	United States	Purdue Boilermakers	20.56	
				Wind: (+0.3 m/s)	

==== 400 meters ====
Placings in the men's 400 meters at the 2025 NCAA Division I Outdoor Track and Field Championships
Rank	Athlete	Nationality	Team	Time	Notes
1st place, gold medalist(s)	Samuel Ogazi	Nigeria	Alabama Crimson Tide	44.84	
2nd place, silver medalist(s)	William Jones	United States	USC Trojans	45.53	
3rd place, bronze medalist(s)	Jordan Pierre	United States	Arkansas-Pine Bluff Golden Lions	45.75	
4	Desean Boyce	Barbados	Texas Tech Red Raiders	45.78	
5	Joseph Taylor	United States	Duke Blue Devils	45.83	
6	Jayden Davis	United States	Arizona State Sun Devils	45.91	
7	Auhmad Robinson	United States	Texas A&M Aggies	46.07	
8	Gabriel Clement II	United States	UCLA Bruins	46.17	
	Gabriel Moronta	United States	South Florida Bulls	—	DQ 15.5-2b

==== 800 meters ====
Placings in the men's 800 meters at the 2025 NCAA Division I Outdoor Track and Field Championships
Rank	Athlete	Nationality	Team	Time	Notes
1st place, gold medalist(s)	Sam Whitmarsh	United States	Texas A&M Aggies	1:45.86	
2nd place, silver medalist(s)	Matthew Erickson	Canada	Oregon Ducks	1:46.32	
3rd place, bronze medalist(s)	Rivaldo Marshall	Jamaica	Arkansas Razorbacks	1:46.71	
4	Samuel Rodman	United States	Princeton Tigers	1:46.86	
5	Aiden McCarthy	United States	Cal Poly Mustangs	1:46.88	
6	Samuel Navarro	United States	Mississippi State Bulldogs	1:47.33	
7	Christian Jackson	United States	Virginia Tech Hokies	1:47.42	
8	Tyrice Taylor	Jamaica	Arkansas Razorbacks	1:47.44	
9	Koitatoi Kidali	Kenya	Oregon Ducks	1:52.10	

==== 1500 meters ====
Placings in the men's 1500 meters at the 2025 NCAA Division I Outdoor Track and Field Championships
Rank	Athlete	Nationality	Team	Time	Notes
1st place, gold medalist(s)	Nathan Green	United States	Washington Huskies	3:47.26	
2nd place, silver medalist(s)	Ethan Strand	United States	North Carolina Tar Heels	3:47.33	
3rd place, bronze medalist(s)	Ferenc Kovacs	Hungary	Harvard Crimson	3:47.42	
4	Adam Spencer	Australia	Wisconsin Badgers	3:47.50	
5	Gary Martin	United States	Virginia Cavaliers	3:47.58	
6	Jack Crull	United States	Bradley Braves	3:47.61	
7	Simeon Birnbaum	United States	Oregon Ducks	3:47.64	
8	Damian Hackett	United States	Cornell Big Red	3:47.74	
9	Brendan Herger	United States	Michigan Wolverines	3:47.88	
10	Harrison Witt	United States	Princeton Tigers	3:47.92	
11	Trent McFarland	United States	Michigan Wolverines	3:47.94	
12	Martin Segurola	Spain	Indiana Hoosiers	3:48.71	

==== 5000 meters ====
Placings in the men's 5000 meters at the 2025 NCAA Division I Outdoor Track and Field Championships
Rank	Athlete	Nationality	Team	Time	Notes
1st place, gold medalist(s)	Brian Musau	Kenya	Oklahoma State Cowboys	13:20.59	SB
2nd place, silver medalist(s)	Habtom Samuel	Eritrea	New Mexico Lobos	13:20.89	
3rd place, bronze medalist(s)	Marco Langon	United States	Villanova Wildcats	13:21.17	PB
4	Valentín Soca	Uruguay	California Baptist Lancers	13:21.76	
5	Rocky Hansen	United States	Wake Forest Demon Deacons	13:22.47	
6	Matt Strangio	United States	Portland Pilots	13:23.28	PB
7	Ishmael Kipkurui	Kenya	New Mexico Lobos	13:25.18	
8	Fouad Messaoudi	Morocco	Oklahoma State Cowboys	13:25.48	PB
9	Toby Gillen	Australia	Ole Miss Rebels	13:26.74	PB
10	David Mullarkey	Great Britain	Northern Arizona Lumberjacks	13:28.43	PB
11	Robin Kwemoi Bera	Kenya	Iowa State Cyclones	13:30.52	
12	Colton Sands	United States	North Carolina Tar Heels	13:36.26	
13	Will Daley	United States	Virginia Cavaliers	13:36.55	PB
14	Luke Tewalt	United States	Wake Forest Demon Deacons	13:37.47	
15	Jacob White	United States	Wyoming Cowboys	13:37.82	
16	Ernest Cheruiyot	Kenya	Texas Tech Red Raiders	13:38.09	
17	Drew Bosley	United States	Northern Arizona Lumberjacks	13:39.04	
18	JoJo Jourdon	United States	Wake Forest Demon Deacons	13:41.00	PB
19	Ethan Strand	United States	North Carolina Tar Heels	13:42.20	
20	Matthew Forrester	United States	Butler Bulldogs	13:43.85	
21	Kidus Misgina	United States	Ole Miss Rebels	13:49.21	
22	Hunter Christopher	United States	Youngstown State Penguins	13:49.43	
23	Luke Grundvig	United States	BYU Cougars	13:54.70	
24	Justin Wachtel	United States	Virginia Cavaliers	14:11.51	

==== 10000 meters ====
Placings in the men's 10000 meters at the 2025 NCAA Division I Outdoor Track and Field Championships
Rank	Athlete	Nationality	Team	Time	Notes
1st place, gold medalist(s)	Ishmael Kipkurui	Kenya	New Mexico Lobos	29:07.70	
2nd place, silver medalist(s)	Habtom Samuel	Eritrea	New Mexico Lobos	29:08.73	
3rd place, bronze medalist(s)	Ernest Cheruiyot	Kenya	Texas Tech Red Raiders	29:10.37	
4	Rodgers Kiplimo	Kenya	Iowa State Cyclones	29:10.89	
5	Evans Kurui	Kenya	Washington State Cougars	29:10.91	
6	David Mullarkey	Great Britain	Northern Arizona Lumberjacks	29:11.05	
7	Dylan Schubert	United States	Furman Paladins	29:11.18	
8	Creed Thompson	United States	BYU Cougars	29:11.44	
9	Denis Kipngetich	Kenya	Oklahoma State Cowboys	29:11.50	
10	Ben Rosa	United States	Harvard Crimson	29:12.19	
11	Dismas Lokira Korir	Kenya	Alabama Crimson Tide	29:13.51	
12	Cole Sprout	United States	Stanford Cardinal	29:18.13	
13	Murphy Smith	United States	Navy Midshipmen	29:18.39	
14	Joey Nokes	United States	BYU Cougars	29:19.76	
15	Ethan Coleman	United States	Notre Dame Fighting Irish	29:22.01	
16	William Zegarski	United States	Butler Bulldogs	29:22.91	
17	Dylan Throop	United States	Penn Quakers	29:24.03	
18	Bernard Cheruiyot	Kenya	Tulane Green Wave	29:24.80	
19	Timothy Chesondin	United States	Arkansas Razorbacks	29:26.37	
20	Drew Bosley	United States	Northern Arizona Lumberjacks	29:28.52	
21	Sam Lawler	United States	Syracuse Orange	29:31.40	
22	Victor Kiprop	Kenya	Alabama Crimson Tide	29:31.44	
23	Shane Brosnan	Ireland	Harvard Crimson	29:33.81	
—	Dennis Kipruto	Kenya	Alabama Crimson Tide	DNF	

==== 110-meter hurdles ====
Placings in the men's 110-meter hurdles at the 2025 NCAA Division I Outdoor Track and Field Championships
Rank	Athlete	Nationality	Team	Time	Notes
1st place, gold medalist(s)	Ja'Kobe Tharp	United States	Auburn Tigers	13.05	PB
2nd place, silver medalist(s)	Zach Extine	United States	Arizona Wildcats	13.13	PB
3rd place, bronze medalist(s)	John Adesola	South Africa	Houston Cougars	13.28	
4	Jamar Marshall Jr.	United States	Houston Cougars	13.34	
5	Demario Prince	Jamaica	Baylor Bears	13.44	
6	Darius Brown	United States	DePaul Blue Demons	13.50	
7	Jahiem Stern	Jamaica	LSU Tigers	13.57	
8	Jayden Smith	United States	Davidson Wildcats	13.65	
—	Kendrick Smallwood	United States	Texas Longhorns	DQ	15.5-2b
				Wind: (+0.1 m/s)	

==== 400-meter hurdles ====
Placings in the men's 400-meter hurdles at the 2025 NCAA Division I Outdoor Track and Field Championships
Rank	Athlete	Nationality	Team	Time	Notes
1st place, gold medalist(s)	Nathaniel Ezekiel	Nigeria	Baylor Bears	47.49	
2nd place, silver medalist(s)	Ja'Qualon Scott	United States	Texas A&M Aggies	48.29	
3rd place, bronze medalist(s)	Kody Blackwood	United States	Texas Longhorns	48.66	
4	Oskar Edlund	Sweden	Texas Tech Red Raiders	49.02	
5	Saad Hinti	Morocco	Tennessee Volunteers	49.11	
6	Bryce McCray	United States	Texas A&M Aggies	49.52	
7	Johnny Brackins	United States	USC Trojans	50.15	
8	Bryce Tucker	United States	Rutgers Scarlet Knights	50.83	
9	Jarrett Gentles	United States	Coppin State Eagles	51.50	

==== 3000-meter steeplechase ====
Placings in the men's 3000-meter steeplechase at the 2025 NCAA Division I Outdoor Track and Field Championships
Rank	Athlete	Nationality	Team	Time	Notes
1st place, gold medalist(s)	James Corrigan	United States	BYU Cougars	8:16.41	PB
2nd place, silver medalist(s)	Geoffrey Kirwa	Kenya	Louisville Cardinals	8:17.12	
3rd place, bronze medalist(s)	Carson Williams	United States	Furman Paladins	8:19.71	PB
4	Joash Ruto	Kenya	Iowa State Cyclones	8:20.47	PB
5	Collins Kiprop Kipngok	Kenya	Kentucky Wildcats	8:22.92	
6	Matthew Kosgei	Kenya	New Mexico Lobos	8:23.70	
7	Benjamin Balazs	United States	Oregon Ducks	8:24.46	PB
8	Rob McManus	United States	Montana State Bobcats	8:25.83	PB
9	CJ Singleton	United States	Notre Dame Fighting Irish	8:28.93	SB
10	Silas Kiptanui	Kenya	Tulane Green Wave	8:32.20	
11	Victor Kibiego	Kenya	Texas A&M Aggies	8:32.33	SB
12	Kristian Imroth	Great Britain	Eastern Kentucky Colonels	8:49.06	

==== 4 × 100-meter relay ====
Placings in the men's 4 × 100-meter relay at the 2025 NCAA Division I Outdoor Track and Field Championships
Rank	Team	Time	Notes
1st place, gold medalist(s)	Auburn Tigers	38.33	
2nd place, silver medalist(s)	USC Trojans	38.46	
3rd place, bronze medalist(s)	Arkansas Razorbacks	38.72	
4	South Florida Bulls	38.73	
5	Tennessee Volunteers	38.79	
6	Kentucky Wildcats	38.85	
7	Minnesota Golden Gophers	38.88	
8	Texas Longhorns	39.10	
	LSU Tigers	DQ	15.5-2b

==== 4 × 400-meter relay ====
Placings in the men's 4 × 400-meter relay at the 2025 NCAA Division I Outdoor Track and Field Championships
Rank	Team	Time	Notes
1st place, gold medalist(s)	South Florida Bulls	3:00.42	
2nd place, silver medalist(s)	Texas A&M Aggies	3:00.73	
3rd place, bronze medalist(s)	Arkansas Razorbacks	3:01.59	
4	Iowa Hawkeyes	3:01.61	
5	Florida Gators	3:01.88	
6	Alabama Crimson Tide	3:02.17	
7	BYU Cougars	3:02.51	
8	USC Trojans	3:03.18	

==== Long jump ====
Placings in the men's long jump at the 2025 NCAA Division I Outdoor Track and Field Championships
Rank	Athlete	Nationality	Team	Mark	Notes
1st place, gold medalist(s)	Malcolm Clemons	United States	Florida Gators	8.04 m (26 ft 4 1/2 in) (+2.2 m/s)	
2nd place, silver medalist(s)	Blair Anderson	United States	Oklahoma State Cowboys	8.02 m (26 ft 3 1/2 in) (+2.4 m/s)	
3rd place, bronze medalist(s)	Henry Kiner	United States	Arkansas Razorbacks	7.96 m (26 ft 1 1/4 in) (+1.2 m/s)	
4	Charles Godfred	Nigeria	Minnesota Golden Gophers	7.91 m (25 ft 11 1/4 in) (+0.3 m/s)	
5	Lokesh Sathyanathan	India	Tarleton State Texans	7.83 m (25 ft 8 1/4 in) (+0.1 m/s)	
6	Tyson Adams	United States	NC State Wolfpack	7.81 m (25 ft 7 1/4 in) (+0.3 m/s)	
7	Gregory Foster Jr.	United States	Princeton Tigers	7.80 m (25 ft 7 in) (+0.8 m/s)	
8	Jayden Keys	United States	Georgia Bulldogs	7.80 m (25 ft 7 in) (+0.1 m/s)	
9	Uroy Ryan	Saint Vincent and the Grenadines	Arkansas State Red Wolves	7.77 m (25 ft 5 3/4 in) (+0.9 m/s)	
10	Tye Hunt	United States	Youngstown State Penguins	7.77 m (25 ft 5 3/4 in) (+0.7 m/s)	
11	Chrstyn John (JC) Stevenson	United States	USC Trojans	7.75 m (25 ft 5 in) (+0.7 m/s)	
12	De'Aundre Ward	United States	Southern Miss Golden Eagles	7.73 m (25 ft 4 1/4 in) (+1.8 m/s)	
13	Reinaldo Rodrigues	Brazil	Arizona Wildcats	7.69 m (25 ft 2 3/4 in) (+0.7 m/s)	
14	Chris Preddie	United States	Texas State Bobcats	7.62 m (25 ft 0 in) (+0.2 m/s)	
15	Roy Morris	United States	Northwestern State Demons	7.51 m (24 ft 7 1/2 in) (+1.0 m/s)	
16	Anthony Riley	United States	Oklahoma Sooners	7.46 m (24 ft 5 1/2 in) (+0.3 m/s)	
17	Micah Larry	United States	Georgia Bulldogs	7.46 m (24 ft 5 1/2 in) (+1.9 m/s)	
18	Juriad Hughes Jr.	United States	Arkansas Razorbacks	7.41 m (24 ft 3 1/2 in) (+1.1 m/s)	
19	DJ Fillmore	United States	Ohio State Buckeyes	7.40 m (24 ft 3 1/4 in) (+2.0 m/s)	
20	Curtis Williams	United States	Florida State Seminoles	7.18 m (23 ft 6 1/2 in) (+0.6 m/s)	
21	Louis Gordon	Cayman Islands	Albany Great Danes	7.13 m (23 ft 4 1/2 in) (+0.6 m/s)	
—	Josh Parrish	United States	Wichita State Shockers	NM	
—	Channing Ferguson	United States	Oregon Ducks	NM	
—	Safin Wills	Jamaica	South Carolina Gamecocks	NM	

==== Triple jump ====
Placings in the men's triple jump at the 2025 NCAA Division I Outdoor Track and Field Championships
Rank	Athlete	Nationality	Team	Mark	Notes
1st place, gold medalist(s)	Brandon Green	United States	Oklahoma Sooners	16.81 m (55 ft 1 3/4 in) (+0.3 m/s)	
2nd place, silver medalist(s)	Floyd Whitaker	United States	Oklahoma Sooners	16.41 m (53 ft 10 in) (+0.1 m/s)	PB
3rd place, bronze medalist(s)	Kyvon Tatham	United States	Florida State Seminoles	16.23 m (53 ft 2 3/4 in) (+0.8 m/s)	
4	Luke Brown	Jamaica	Kentucky Wildcats	16.18 m (53 ft 1 in) (+0.5 m/s)	
5	Selva Prabhu	India	Kansas State Wildcats	16.09 m (52 ft 9 1/4 in) (+0.2 m/s)	
6	Theophilus Mudzengerere	Zimbabwe	South Carolina Gamecocks	16.09 m (52 ft 9 1/4 in) (+1.0 m/s)	
7	Safin Wills	Jamaica	Oregon Ducks	16.07 m (52 ft 8 1/2 in) (+0.5 m/s)	SB
8	Stafon Roach	Guyana	Louisiana–Monroe Warhawks	15.99 m (52 ft 5 1/2 in) (−0.1 m/s)	
9	Abraham Johnson	United States	Eastern Illinois Panthers	15.96 m (52 ft 4 1/4 in) (+0.9 m/s)	
10	Hakeem Ford	United States	Minnesota Golden Gophers	15.89 m (52 ft 1 1/2 in) (+0.5 m/s)	
11	Jaren Holmes	United States	USC Trojans	15.75 m (51 ft 8 in) (+0.6 m/s)	
12	Alexandre Malanda	France	Kent State Golden Flashes	15.69 m (51 ft 5 1/2 in) (+0.1 m/s)	
13	Ryan John	United States	Clemson Tigers	15.65 m (51 ft 4 in) (−0.7 m/s)	
14	Kelsey Daniel	Trinidad and Tobago	Texas Longhorns	15.53 m (50 ft 11 1/4 in) (+0.0 m/s)	
15	Jeremy Nelson	United States	Louisiana Ragin' Cajuns	15.46 m (50 ft 8 1/2 in) (+1.2 m/s)	
16	Roman Kuleshov	Russia	Louisville Cardinals	15.35 m (50 ft 4 1/4 in) (−0.5 m/s)	
17	Xavier Partee	United States	North Carolina A&T Aggies	15.32 m (50 ft 3 in) (+1.7 m/s)	
18	Chris Preddie	United States	Texas State Bobcats	15.20 m (49 ft 10 1/4 in) (+1.4 m/s)	
19	Ledamian Rowell	United States	Jackson State Tigers	15.15 m (49 ft 8 1/4 in) (−0.4 m/s)	
20	Sir Jonathan Sims	United States	Tarleton State Texans	15.07 m (49 ft 5 1/4 in) (−0.1 m/s)	
21	Xavier Drumgoole	United States	Stanford Cardinal	13.06 m (42 ft 10 in) (−0.3 m/s)	
—	Anthony Woods II	United States	Alabama State Hornets	NM	
—	Jaden Lippett	United States	Florida Gators	NM	
—	Viktor Morozov	Estonia	Illinois Fighting Illini	NM	

==== High jump ====
Placings in the men's high jump at the 2025 NCAA Division I Outdoor Track and Field Championships
Rank	Athlete	Nationality	Team	2.10	2.15	2.20	2.23	2.27	2.30	Mark	Notes
1st place, gold medalist(s)	Arvesta Troupe	United States	Ole Miss Rebels	o	o	o	xo	o	xxx	2.27 m (7 ft 5 1/4 in)	PB
2nd place, silver medalist(s)	Kason O'Riley	United States	Texas State Bobcats	o	o	o	xxx			2.20 m (7 ft 2 1/2 in)	
2nd place, silver medalist(s)	Aiden Hayes	United States	Texas State Bobcats	o	o	o	xxx			2.20 m (7 ft 2 1/2 in)	
4	Kamyren Garrett	United States	Illinois Fighting Illini	o	o	xo	xxx			2.20 m (7 ft 2 1/2 in)	PB
5	Nathanil Figgers	United States	South Carolina Gamecocks	xxo	o	xo	xxx			2.20 m (7 ft 2 1/2 in)	PB
6	Kyren Washington	United States	Oklahoma Sooners	o	o	xxo	xxx			2.20 m (7 ft 2 1/2 in)	PB
6	Tyus Wilson	United States	Nebraska Cornhuskers	o	o	xxo	xxx			2.20 m (7 ft 2 1/2 in)	
8	Eddie Kurjak	United States	Georgia Bulldogs	o	o	xxx				2.15 m (7 ft 1/2 in)	
8	Kuda Chadenga	Zimbabwe	LSU Tigers	o	o	xxx				2.15 m (7 ft 1/2 in)	
8	Kampton Kam	Singapore	Penn Quakers	o	o	xxx				2.15 m (7 ft 1/2 in)	
11	Desire Tonye-Nyemeck	United States	Nebraska Cornhuskers	xo	o	xxx				2.15 m (7 ft 1/2 in)	
12	Elias Gerald	United States	USC Trojans	xo	xo	xxx				2.15 m (7 ft 1/2 in)	
13	Bode Gilkerson	United States	Purdue Boilermakers	o	xxo	xxx				2.15 m (7 ft 1/2 in)	
13	Antrea Mita	Greece	Houston Cougars	o	xxo	xxx				2.15 m (7 ft 1/2 in)	
15	Luke Hatfield-Jackson	United States	Southeast Missouri State Redhawks	xxo	xxo	xxx				2.15 m (7 ft 1/2 in)	
16	Miles Grant	United States	Sacramento State Hornets	o	xxx					2.10 m (6 ft 10 1/2 in)	
16	Kennedy Sauder	United States	Miami Hurricanes	o	xxx					2.10 m (6 ft 10 1/2 in)	
16	Channing Ferguson	United States	South Carolina Gamecocks	o	xxx					2.10 m (6 ft 10 1/2 in)	
16	Riyon Rankin	United States	Georgia Bulldogs	o	xxx					2.10 m (6 ft 10 1/2 in)	
20	Tito Alofe	United States	Harvard Crimson	xo	xxx					2.10 m (6 ft 10 1/2 in)	
20	Osawese Agbonkonkon	United States	Texas Longhorns	xo	xxx					2.10 m (6 ft 10 1/2 in)	
20	Enaji Muhammad	United States	Connecticut Huskies	xo	xxx					2.10 m (6 ft 10 1/2 in)	
23	Roman Smith	United States	Southern Jaguars	xxo	xxx					2.10 m (6 ft 10 1/2 in)	
—	Scottie Vines	United States	Arkansas Razorbacks	xxx						NH	

==== Pole vault ====
Placings in the men's pole vault at the 2025 NCAA Division I Outdoor Track and Field Championships
Rank	Athlete	Nationality	Team	5.18	5.33	5.43	5.53	5.58	5.63	5.68	5.73	5.78	5.83	5.85	Mark	Notes
1st place, gold medalist(s)	Aleksandr Solovyov	Russia	Texas A&M Aggies	–	o	–	o	–	xxo	x-	x-	o	x-	xx	5.78 m (18 ft 11 1/2 in)	PB
2nd place, silver medalist(s)	Ashton Barkdull	United States	Kansas Jayhawks	o	o	o	xo	–	o	o	xo	x-	xx		5.73 m (18 ft 9 1/2 in)	PB
3rd place, bronze medalist(s)	Bradley Jelmert	United States	Arkansas State Red Wolves	–	o	o	o	o	xxo	x-	xx				5.63 m (18 ft 5 1/2 in)	PB
4	Benjamin Conacher	United States	Virginia Tech Hokies	o	xo	xo	xxo	xo	xxx						5.58 m (18 ft 3 1/2 in)	
5	Simen Guttormsen	Norway	Duke Blue Devils	–	xxo	–	o	–	x-	x-	x				5.53 m (18 ft 1 1/2 in)	
5	Bryce Barkdull	United States	Kansas Jayhawks	o	xo	xo	o	xxx							5.53 m (18 ft 1 1/2 in)	PB
7	Cody Johnston	United States	Illinois Fighting Illini	o	xxo	xo	o	xxx							5.53 m (18 ft 1 1/2 in)	SB
7	Kevin O'Sullivan	United States	Rutgers Scarlet Knights	xo	o	xx-	o	xxx							5.53 m (18 ft 1 1/2 in)	PB
9	William Staggs	United States	Indiana State Sycamores	xo	o	o	xo	xxx							5.53 m (18 ft 1 1/2 in)	=PB
10	Cade Gray	United States	Tennessee Volunteers	o	o	o	x-	xx							5.43 m (17 ft 9 3/4 in)	
11	Scott Toney	United States	Washington Huskies	o	xo	o	xxx								5.43 m (17 ft 9 3/4 in)	
12	Jak Urlacher	United States	Minnesota Golden Gophers	o	xxo	o	xxx								5.43 m (17 ft 9 3/4 in)	
13	Logan Hammer	United States	Utah State Aggies	–	o	xxx									5.33 m (17 ft 5 3/4 in)	
13	Nico Morales	United States	Rutgers Scarlet Knights	o	o	xxx									5.33 m (17 ft 5 3/4 in)	
13	Evan Puckett	United States	Tennessee Volunteers	o	o	xxx									5.33 m (17 ft 5 3/4 in)	
13	John Kendricks	United States	Ole Miss Rebels	o	o	xx-	x								5.33 m (17 ft 5 3/4 in)	
17	Logan Kelley	United States	Ole Miss Rebels	o	xo	xxx									5.33 m (17 ft 5 3/4 in)	=PB
18	Sean Gribble	United States	Texas Tech Red Raiders	–	xxo	xxx									5.33 m (17 ft 5 3/4 in)	
18	Tre Young	United States	South Dakota Coyotes	o	xxo	xxx									5.33 m (17 ft 5 3/4 in)	
20	Arnie Grunert	United States	Western Illinois Leathernecks	o	xxx										5.18 m (16 ft 11 3/4 in)	
21	Nikolai van Huyssteen	South Africa	Georgia Bulldogs	xo	xxx										5.18 m (16 ft 11 3/4 in)	
—	Hunter Garretson	United States	Akron Zips	–	–	-x	xx								NH	
—	Colton Rhodes	United States	Oklahoma Sooners	xxx											NH	
—	Ricardo Montes de Oca	Venezuela	High Point Panthers	–	x-	xx									NH	

==== Shot put ====
Placings in the men's shot put at the 2025 NCAA Division I Outdoor Track and Field Championships
Rank	Athlete	Nationality	Team	1	2	3	4	5	6	Mark	Notes
1st place, gold medalist(s)	Jason Swarens	United States	Wisconsin Badgers	19.50	20.17	19.84	X	20.00	21.23	21.23 m (69 ft 7 3/4 in)	
2nd place, silver medalist(s)	Tommy Kitchell	United States	North Carolina Tar Heels	20.11	19.03	X	X	X	20.74	20.74 m (68 ft 1/2 in)	PB
3rd place, bronze medalist(s)	Tarik Robinson-O'Hagan	United States	Ole Miss Rebels	X	19.46	20.10	20.34	20.41	X	20.41 m (66 ft 11 1/2 in)	
4	Kobe Lawrence	Jamaica	Oregon Ducks	19.43	19.47	19.65	19.90	20.32	19.89	20.32 m (66 ft 8 in)	PB
5	Christopher Licata	United States	South Carolina Gamecocks	19.76	19.86	20.11	20.15	19.91	20.00	20.15 m (66 ft 1 1/4 in)	
6	Danny Bryant	United States	BYU Cougars	19.71	18.47	18.96	X	X	X	19.71 m (64 ft 7 3/4 in)	
7	Dylan Targgart	United States	South Carolina Gamecocks	18.51	19.48	19.39	X	19.18	X	19.48 m (63 ft 10 3/4 in)	
8	Fred Moudani-Likibi	France	Cincinnati Bearcats	X	19.19	19.44	18.84	18.92	18.70	19.44 m (63 ft 9 1/4 in)	
9	Joseph White	United States	Wisconsin Badgers	18.83	18.24	19.16	19.30	X	18.53	19.30 m (63 ft 3 3/4 in)	
10	Zach Landa	United States	Arizona Wildcats	18.92	X	19.05				19.05 m (62 ft 6 in)	
11	Bryce Foster	United States	Kansas Jayhawks	18.96	X	X				18.96 m (62 ft 2 1/4 in)	
12	Christopher Crawford	Trinidad and Tobago	Alabama Crimson Tide	18.92	18.94	18.58				18.94 m (62 ft 1 1/2 in)	
13	Joe Licata	United States	Princeton Tigers	X	18.77	18.93				18.93 m (62 ft 1 1/4 in)	
14	Trevor Gunzell	Jamaica	Alabama Crimson Tide	17.70	18.91	18.80				18.91 m (62 ft 1/4 in)	
15	Alexander Kolesnikoff	Australia	Georgia Bulldogs	18.75	18.70	18.52				18.75 m (61 ft 6 in)	
16	Jacob Cookinham	United States	Kansas Jayhawks	18.23	18.70	X				18.70 m (61 ft 4 in)	
17	Obiora Okeke	United States	Columbia Lions	18.21	18.25	18.65				18.65 m (61 ft 2 1/4 in)	
18	Cam Jones	United States	Iowa State Cyclones	18.62	18.32	X				18.62 m (61 ft 1 in)	
19	Maxwell Otterdahl	United States	Nebraska Cornhuskers	X	17.62	18.55				18.55 m (60 ft 10 1/4 in)	
20	Josh Huisman	United States	Michigan Wolverines	18.33	X	X				18.33 m (60 ft 1 1/2 in)	
21	Tucker Smith	United States	Oklahoma Sooners	17.87	18.26	X				18.26 m (59 ft 10 3/4 in)	
22	Daniel Reynolds	United States	Wyoming Cowboys	17.82	X	X				17.82 m (58 ft 5 1/2 in)	
—	Sascha Salesius Schmidt	Germany	Memphis Tigers	X	X	X				NM	
—	Trey Wilson III	United States	Texas Tech Red Raiders	X	X	X				NM	

==== Discus throw ====
Placings in the men's discus throw at the 2025 NCAA Division I Outdoor Track and Field Championships
Rank	Athlete	Nationality	Team	1	2	3	4	5	6	Mark	Notes
1st place, gold medalist(s)	Ralford Mullings	Jamaica	Oklahoma Sooners	X	65.92	67.70	65.92	67.48	69.31	69.31 m (227 ft 4 1/2 in)	MR
2nd place, silver medalist(s)	Mykolas Alekna	Lithuania	California Golden Bears	66.44	X	X	X	66.77	X	66.77 m (219 ft 1/2 in)	
3rd place, bronze medalist(s)	Uladzislau Puchko	Belarus	Virginia Tech Hokies	62.39	60.05	58.88	61.31	63.94	62.44	63.94 m (209 ft 9 1/4 in)	PB
4	Racquil Broderick	Jamaica	USC Trojans	57.83	59.63	60.28	54.25	63.31	63.06	63.31 m (207 ft 8 1/2 in)	PB
5	Michael Pinckney	United States	UCLA Bruins	58.64	61.39	60.95	X	57.72	X	61.39 m (201 ft 4 3/4 in)	PB
6	Dimitrios Pavlidis	Greece	Kansas Jayhawks	61.04	60.30	60.09	X	59.61	X	61.04 m (200 ft 3 in)	
7	Vincent Ugwoke	Nigeria	South Florida Bulls	X	59.15	60.58	58.30	X	X	60.58 m (198 ft 9 in)	
8	Aron Alvarez Aranda	South Africa	Tennessee Volunteers	59.87	53.89	56.45	55.86	58.62	58.63	59.87 m (196 ft 5 in)	
9	Christopher Crawford	Trinidad and Tobago	Alabama Crimson Tide	X	59.08	X	X	58.34	X	59.08 m (193 ft 9 3/4 in)	
10	Jacob Lemmon	United States	Florida Gators	59.07	58.18	57.03				59.07 m (193 ft 9 1/2 in)	
11	Desmond Coleman	United States	Miami Hurricanes	X	56.04	58.58				58.58 m (192 ft 2 1/4 in)	
12	Youssef Koudssi	United States	Arizona Wildcats	58.32	58.28	56.80				58.32 m (191 ft 4 in)	
13	Casey Helm	United States	Princeton Tigers	X	57.79	56.13				57.79 m (189 ft 7 in)	
14	Trevor Gunzell	Jamaica	Alabama Crimson Tide	X	57.52	X				57.52 m (188 ft 8 1/2 in)	
15	Christopher Young	Jamaica	Alabama Crimson Tide	56.31	55.47	57.23				57.23 m (187 ft 9 in)	
16	Maxwell Otterdahl	United States	Nebraska Cornhuskers	53.86	57.07	X				57.07 m (187 ft 2 3/4 in)	
17	Iosif Papa	Cyprus	UMBC Retrievers	54.08	56.98	53.54				56.98 m (186 ft 11 1/4 in)	
18	Aidan Elbettar	United States	Oregon Ducks	X	52.71	56.49				56.49 m (185 ft 4 in)	
19	Paden Lewis	United States	Southeast Missouri State Redhawks	56.27	X	54.47				56.27 m (184 ft 7 1/4 in)	
20	Texas Tanner	United States	Air Force Falcons	X	55.76	X				55.76 m (182 ft 11 1/4 in)	
21	Skylar Coffey	United States	Missouri Tigers	55.59	X	50.08				55.59 m (182 ft 4 1/2 in)	
22	Oscar Rodriguez	United States	Texas Tech Red Raiders	53.27	55.20	X				55.20 m (181 ft 1 in)	
23	Seth Allen	United States	Auburn Tigers	47.66	54.06	54.88				54.88 m (180 ft 1/2 in)	
24	Tanner Watson	United States	Ohio State Buckeyes	53.79	52.23	53.92				53.92 m (176 ft 10 3/4 in)	

==== Javelin throw ====
Placings in the men's javelin throw at the 2025 NCAA Division I Outdoor Track and Field Championships
Rank	Athlete	Nationality	Team	1	2	3	4	5	6	Mark	Notes
1st place, gold medalist(s)	Devoux Deysel	South Africa	Miami Hurricanes	81.75	x	77.17	78.08	x	76.09	81.75 m (268 ft 2 1/2 in)	PB
2nd place, silver medalist(s)	Leikel Cabrera	Cuba	Florida Gators	78.51	75.52	79.05	77.39	72.94	78.89	79.05 m (259 ft 4 in)	PB
3rd place, bronze medalist(s)	Callan Saldutto	Canada	Missouri Tigers	76.88	–	x	68.87	x	68.62	76.88 m (252 ft 2 3/4 in)	PB
4	Moustafa Mahmoud	Egypt	Georgia Bulldogs	68.10	76.69	72.06	x	x	71.35	76.69 m (251 ft 7 1/4 in)	
5	Keyshawn Strachan	Bahamas	Nebraska Cornhuskers	67.37	75.03	72.15	x	71.76	76.44	76.44 m (250 ft 9 1/4 in)	
6	Mike Stein	United States	Iowa Hawkeyes	75.77	x	70.38	72.40	71.54	x	75.77 m (248 ft 7 in)	
7	Arthur Petersen	Denmark	Nebraska Cornhuskers	70.58	72.73	75.50	73.21	75.16	74.25	75.50 m (247 ft 8 1/4 in)	
8	James Kotowski	United States	UMass Lowell River Hawks	71.13	75.00	73.53	71.65	75.18	73.92	75.18 m (246 ft 7 3/4 in)	PB
9	Colin Winkler	United States	Central Connecticut Blue Devils	65.17	61.19	74.97	61.51	71.46	64.76	74.97 m (245 ft 11 1/2 in)	PB
10	Remi Rougetet	France	Mississippi State Bulldogs	72.56	71.60	73.30				73.30 m (240 ft 5 3/4 in)	
11	Riley Marx	United States	Kansas State Wildcats	70.71	x	x				70.71 m (231 ft 11 3/4 in)	
12	Liam Miksic	United States	UC Irvine Anteaters	66.01	70.13	66.39				70.13 m (230 ft 1 in)	
13	Ryan Rieckmann	United States	Cincinnati Bearcats	59.34	64.13	69.59				69.59 m (228 ft 3 3/4 in)	
14	Dash Sirmon	United States	Nebraska Cornhuskers	63.65	69.17	67.22				69.17 m (226 ft 11 in)	
15	Trevor Hook	United States	Northern Arizona Lumberjacks	67.01	67.84	62.18				67.84 m (222 ft 6 3/4 in)	
16	Jack Greaves	Australia	Rice Owls	67.38	65.12	63.01				67.38 m (221 ft 3/4 in)	
17	Tuomas Närhi	Finland	Mississippi State Bulldogs	65.81	x	x				65.81 m (215 ft 10 3/4 in)	
18	Gabriel Koletsi	Greece	Memphis Tigers	62.26	x	65.59				65.59 m (215 ft 2 1/4 in)	
19	Jesse Avina	United States	Arizona Wildcats	62.10	59.15	65.49				65.49 m (214 ft 10 1/4 in)	
20	Preston Kuznof	United States	TCU Horned Frogs	60.59	64.62	60.92				64.62 m (212 ft 0 in)	
21	Roddy Schenk	United States	Tennessee Volunteers	58.23	62.84	59.00				62.84 m (206 ft 2 in)	
22	Steven Coponi	United States	Rutgers Scarlet Knights	62.73	62.67	62.82				62.82 m (206 ft 1 in)	
23	Burr Kevin	United States	Tennessee Volunteers	x	60.19	61.62				61.62 m (202 ft 1 3/4 in)	
24	Sam Roller	United States	North Dakota State Bison	60.58	60.02	x				60.58 m (198 ft 9 in)	

==== Hammer throw ====
Placings in the men's hammer throw at the 2025 NCAA Division I Outdoor Track and Field Championships
Rank	Athlete	Nationality	Team	1	2	3	4	5	6	Mark	Notes
1st place, gold medalist(s)	Konstantinos Zaltos	Greece	Minnesota Golden Gophers	76.92	76.72	77.18	78.08	x	x	78.08 m (256 ft 2 in)	PB
2nd place, silver medalist(s)	Angelos Mantzouranis	Greece	Minnesota Golden Gophers	76.84	75.36	76.66	76.96	x	76.92	76.96 m (252 ft 5 3/4 in)	
3rd place, bronze medalist(s)	Tarik Robinson-O'Hagan	United States	Ole Miss Rebels	75.62	x	x	76.61	76.78	75.58	76.78 m (251 ft 10 3/4 in)	PB
4	Texas Tanner	United States	Air Force Falcons	71.79	71.57	75.22	x	71.01	71.04	75.22 m (246 ft 9 1/4 in)	
5	Rory Devaney	United States	Cal Poly Mustangs	68.89	74.16	71.74	70.88	72.39	70.57	74.16 m (243 ft 3 1/2 in)	PB
6	Ryan Johnson	United States	Iowa Hawkeyes	71.91	68.90	x	70.30	69.60	67.22	71.91 m (235 ft 11 in)	
7	Daniel Reynolds	United States	Wyoming Cowboys	68.72	x	67.75	69.68	66.73	x	69.68 m (228 ft 7 1/4 in)	
8	Christian Toro	United States	Duke Blue Devils	68.94	68.19	68.52	64.93	68.07	67.65	68.94 m (226 ft 2 in)	
9	Kyle Brown	United States	Auburn Tigers	68.34	68.51	x	x	68.91	x	68.91 m (226 ft 3/4 in)	PB
10	Travis Martin	United States	Cal Poly Mustangs	67.91	68.31	66.88				68.31 m (224 ft 1 1/4 in)	
11	Sean Smith	United States	Iowa Hawkeyes	x	67.81	65.94				67.81 m (222 ft 5 1/2 in)	
12	Jake Dalton	United States	Ole Miss Rebels	67.68	67.58	67.79				67.79 m (222 ft 4 3/4 in)	
13	Bryson Smith	United States	Ole Miss Rebels	65.99	x	67.79				67.79 m (222 ft 4 3/4 in)	
14	Kyle Moison	United States	Auburn Tigers	65.29	66.84	66.24				66.84 m (219 ft 3 1/4 in)	
15	Keyandre Davis	United States	Virginia Cavaliers	65.83	66.24	64.72				66.24 m (217 ft 3 3/4 in)	
16	Cole Hooper	United States	Wisconsin Badgers	63.43	65.89	65.98				65.98 m (216 ft 5 1/2 in)	
17	Igor Olaru	Moldova	Baylor Bears	64.85	x	65.96				65.96 m (216 ft 4 3/4 in)	
18	Alex Bernstein	Great Britain	DePaul Blue Demons	64.85	64.32	65.69				65.69 m (215 ft 6 in)	
19	Noa Isaia	United States	Arkansas State Red Wolves	x	62.25	65.08				65.08 m (213 ft 6 in)	
20	Orry Willems	Belgium	Cincinnati Bearcats	63.66	64.81	x				64.81 m (212 ft 7 1/2 in)	
21	Sean Mockler	Ireland	Indiana Hoosiers	62.08	64.07	62.59				64.07 m (210 ft 2 1/4 in)	
22	Mason Hickel	United States	Ole Miss Rebels	x	63.71	x				63.71 m (209 ft 1/4 in)	
23	Alex Kristeller	United States	Manhattan Jaspers	x	61.07	x				61.07 m (200 ft 4 1/4 in)	
24	Kellen Kimes	United States	Liberty Flames	60.67	x	x				60.67 m (199 ft 1/2 in)	

==== Decathlon ====
Placings in the men's decathlon at the 2025 NCAA Division I Outdoor Track and Field Championships
Rank	Athlete	Nationality	Team	Overall points	100 m	LJ	SP	HJ	400 m	110 m H	DT	PV	JT	1500 m
1st place, gold medalist(s)	Peyton Bair	United States	Mississippi State	8323	1035; 10.25	881; 7.28 m (23 ft 10 1/2 in)	742; 14.22 m (46 ft 7 3/4 in)	813; 2.01 m (6 ft 7 in)	1008; 46.00	940; 14.27	697; 41.59 m (136 ft 5 1/4 in)	793; 4.61 m (15 ft 1 1/4 in)	706; 57.87 m (189 ft 10 1/4 in)	708; 4:35.69
2nd place, silver medalist(s)	Brad Thomas	United States	UC Santa Barbara	7888	878; 10.92	852; 7.16 m (23 ft 5 3/4 in)	755; 14.44 m (47 ft 4 1/2 in)	813; 2.01 m (6 ft 7 in)	894; 48.32	773; 15.65	723; 42.86 m (140 ft 7 1/4 in)	620; 4.01 m (13 ft 1 3/4 in)	790; 63.47 m (208 ft 2 3/4 in)	790; 4:23.24
3rd place, bronze medalist(s)	Emil Uhlin	Sweden	Kansas State	7859	878; 11.01	677; 6.41 m (21 ft 1/4 in)	709; 13.69 m (44 ft 10 3/4 in)	785; 1.98 m (6 ft 5 3/4 in)	868; 48.85	863; 14.89	769; 45.10 m (147 ft 11 1/2 in)	913; 5.01 m (16 ft 5 in)	622; 52.28 m (171 ft 6 1/4 in)	795; 4:22.46
4	Kenneth Byrd	United States	Louisville	7842	000; 00.00	000; 0.00 m (0 in)	000; 00.00 m (0 in)	000; 0.00 m (0 in)	000; 00.00	000; 00.00	000; 00.00 m (0 in)	000; 0.00 m (0 in)	000; 00.00 m (0 in)	000; 0:00.00
5	Grant Levesque	United States	Houston	7797	000; 00.00	000; 0.00 m (0 in)	000; 00.00 m (0 in)	000; 0.00 m (0 in)	000; 00.00	000; 00.00	000; 00.00 m (0 in)	000; 0.00 m (0 in)	000; 00.00 m (0 in)	000; 0:00.00
6	Ben Barton	United States	BYU	7777	000; 00.00	000; 0.00 m (0 in)	000; 00.00 m (0 in)	000; 0.00 m (0 in)	000; 00.00	000; 00.00	000; 00.00 m (0 in)	000; 0.00 m (0 in)	000; 00.00 m (0 in)	000; 0:00.00
7	Alexander Jung	Germany	Kansas	7746	000; 00.00	000; 0.00 m (0 in)	000; 00.00 m (0 in)	000; 0.00 m (0 in)	000; 00.00	000; 00.00	000; 00.00 m (0 in)	000; 0.00 m (0 in)	000; 00.00 m (0 in)	000; 0:00.00
8	Colby Eddowes	Australia	Arkansas State	7725	000; 00.00	000; 0.00 m (0 in)	000; 00.00 m (0 in)	000; 0.00 m (0 in)	000; 00.00	000; 00.00	000; 00.00 m (0 in)	000; 0.00 m (0 in)	000; 00.00 m (0 in)	000; 0:00.00
9	Landon Helms	United States	Boise State	7696	000; 00.00	000; 0.00 m (0 in)	000; 00.00 m (0 in)	000; 0.00 m (0 in)	000; 00.00	000; 00.00	000; 00.00 m (0 in)	000; 0.00 m (0 in)	000; 00.00 m (0 in)	000; 0:00.00
10	Paul Kallenberg	Germany	Louisville	7669	000; 00.00	000; 0.00 m (0 in)	000; 00.00 m (0 in)	000; 0.00 m (0 in)	000; 00.00	000; 00.00	000; 00.00 m (0 in)	000; 0.00 m (0 in)	000; 00.00 m (0 in)	000; 0:00.00
11	Cole Wilson	Canada	High Point	7662	000; 00.00	000; 0.00 m (0 in)	000; 00.00 m (0 in)	000; 0.00 m (0 in)	000; 00.00	000; 00.00	000; 00.00 m (0 in)	000; 0.00 m (0 in)	000; 00.00 m (0 in)	000; 0:00.00
12	Joshua Mooney	United States	Connecticut	7662	000; 00.00	000; 0.00 m (0 in)	000; 00.00 m (0 in)	000; 0.00 m (0 in)	000; 00.00	000; 00.00	000; 00.00 m (0 in)	000; 0.00 m (0 in)	000; 00.00 m (0 in)	000; 0:00.00
13	Nick Bianco	United States	Colorado	7651	000; 00.00	000; 0.00 m (0 in)	000; 00.00 m (0 in)	000; 0.00 m (0 in)	000; 00.00	000; 00.00	000; 00.00 m (0 in)	000; 0.00 m (0 in)	000; 00.00 m (0 in)	000; 0:00.00
14	Ryan Gregory	United States	Long Beach St	7634	000; 00.00	000; 0.00 m (0 in)	000; 00.00 m (0 in)	000; 0.00 m (0 in)	000; 00.00	000; 00.00	000; 00.00 m (0 in)	000; 0.00 m (0 in)	000; 00.00 m (0 in)	000; 0:00.00
15	Diarmuid O'Connor	Ireland	Connecticut	7580	000; 00.00	000; 0.00 m (0 in)	000; 00.00 m (0 in)	000; 0.00 m (0 in)	000; 00.00	000; 00.00	000; 00.00 m (0 in)	000; 0.00 m (0 in)	000; 00.00 m (0 in)	000; 0:00.00
16	Tayton Klein	United States	Kansas	7554	000; 00.00	000; 0.00 m (0 in)	000; 00.00 m (0 in)	000; 0.00 m (0 in)	000; 00.00	000; 00.00	000; 00.00 m (0 in)	000; 0.00 m (0 in)	000; 00.00 m (0 in)	000; 0:00.00
17	Andreas Hantson	Estonia	Purdue	7518	000; 00.00	000; 0.00 m (0 in)	000; 00.00 m (0 in)	000; 0.00 m (0 in)	000; 00.00	000; 00.00	000; 00.00 m (0 in)	000; 0.00 m (0 in)	000; 00.00 m (0 in)	000; 0:00.00
18	Brayden Richards	United States	Air Force	7488	000; 00.00	000; 0.00 m (0 in)	000; 00.00 m (0 in)	000; 0.00 m (0 in)	000; 00.00	000; 00.00	000; 00.00 m (0 in)	000; 0.00 m (0 in)	000; 00.00 m (0 in)	000; 0:00.00
19	Jaden Roskelley	United States	BYU	7475	000; 00.00	000; 0.00 m (0 in)	000; 00.00 m (0 in)	000; 0.00 m (0 in)	000; 00.00	000; 00.00	000; 00.00 m (0 in)	000; 0.00 m (0 in)	000; 00.00 m (0 in)	000; 0:00.00
—	Marcus Weaver	United States	Arkansas	DNF	000; 00.00	000; 0.00 m (0 in)	000; 00.00 m (0 in)	000; 0.00 m (0 in)	000; 00.00	000; 00.00	000; 00.00 m (0 in)	000; 0.00 m (0 in)	000; 00.00 m (0 in)	000; 0:00.00
—	Edgar Campre	Portugal	Miami	DNF	000; 00.00	000; 0.00 m (0 in)	000; 00.00 m (0 in)	000; 0.00 m (0 in)	000; 00.00	000; 00.00	000; 00.00 m (0 in)	000; 0.00 m (0 in)	000; 00.00 m (0 in)	000; 0:00.00
—	Max Forte	United States	Duke	DNF	000; 00.00	000; 0.00 m (0 in)	000; 00.00 m (0 in)	000; 0.00 m (0 in)	000; 00.00	000; 00.00	000; 00.00 m (0 in)	000; 0.00 m (0 in)	000; 00.00 m (0 in)	000; 0:00.00
—	Abraham Vogelsang	Norway	Iowa	DNF	000; 00.00	000; 0.00 m (0 in)	000; 00.00 m (0 in)	000; 0.00 m (0 in)	000; 00.00	000; 00.00	000; 00.00 m (0 in)	000; 0.00 m (0 in)	000; 00.00 m (0 in)	000; 0:00.00
—	Till Steinforth	Germany	Nebraska	DNF	000; 00.00	000; 0.00 m (0 in)	000; 00.00 m (0 in)	000; 0.00 m (0 in)	000; 00.00	000; 00.00	000; 00.00 m (0 in)	000; 0.00 m (0 in)	000; 00.00 m (0 in)	000; 0:00.00

=== Women ===
==== 100 meters ====
Placings in the women's 100 meters at the 2025 NCAA Division I Outdoor Track and Field Championships
Rank	Athlete	Nationality	Team	Time	Notes
1st place, gold medalist(s)	Samirah Moody	United States	USC Trojans	11.14 [.136]	
2nd place, silver medalist(s)	JaMeesia Ford	United States	South Carolina Gamecocks	11.14 [.139]	
3rd place, bronze medalist(s)	Tima Godbless	Nigeria	LSU Tigers	11.19 [.183]	
4	Anthaya Charlton	Bahamas	Florida Gators	11.19 [.189]	
5	Leah Bertrand	Trinidad and Tobago	Ohio State Buckeyes	11.21	
6	Shenese Walker	Jamaica	Florida State Seminoles	11.23 [.221]	
7	Dajaz Defrand	United States	USC Trojans	11.23 [.224]	
8	Brianna Selby	United States	USC Trojans	11.25	
9	Victoria Cameron	United States	Tarleton State Texans	11.30	
				Wind: (−1.4 m/s)	

==== 200 meters ====
Placings in the women's 200 meters at the 2025 NCAA Division I Outdoor Track and Field Championships
Rank	Athlete	Nationality	Team	Time	Notes
1st place, gold medalist(s)	JaMeesia Ford	United States	South Carolina Gamecocks	22.21	
2nd place, silver medalist(s)	Madison Whyte	United States	USC Trojans	22.23	
3rd place, bronze medalist(s)	Dajaz Defrand	United States	USC Trojans	22.39	
4	Leah Bertrand	Trinidad and Tobago	Ohio State Buckeyes	22.60	
5	Jasmine Montgomery	United States	Texas A&M Aggies	22.61	
6	Kenondra Davis	United States	Texas Longhorns	22.66	
7	Jayla Jamison	United States	South Carolina Gamecocks	22.77	
8	Gabrielle Matthews	Jamaica	Florida Gators	22.84	
9	Samirah Moody	United States	USC Trojans	22.86	
				Wind: (+1.6 m/s)	

==== 400 meters ====
Placings in the women's 400 meters at the 2025 NCAA Division I Outdoor Track and Field Championships
Rank	Athlete	Nationality	Team	Time	Notes
1st place, gold medalist(s)	Aaliyah Butler	United States	Georgia Bulldogs	49.26	
2nd place, silver medalist(s)	Dejanea Oakley	Jamaica	Georgia Bulldogs	49.65	
3rd place, bronze medalist(s)	Rosey Effiong	United States	Arkansas Razorbacks	50.51	
4	Ella Onojuvwevwo	Nigeria	LSU Tigers	50.57	
5	Kaylyn Brown	United States	Arkansas Razorbacks	51.30	
6	Rachel Joseph	United States	Iowa State Cyclones	51.36	
7	Sami Oblad	United States	BYU Cougars	51.57	
8	Kaelyaah Liburd	British Virgin Islands	Florida State Seminoles	51.69	
9	Vimbayi Maisvorewa	Zimbabwe	Auburn Tigers	51.84	

==== 800 meters ====
Placings in the women's 800 meters at the 2025 NCAA Division I Outdoor Track and Field Championships
Rank	Athlete	Nationality	Team	Time	Notes
1st place, gold medalist(s)	Roisin Willis	United States	Stanford Cardinal	1:58.13	MR
2nd place, silver medalist(s)	Makayla Paige	United States	North Carolina Tar Heels	1:58.97	
3rd place, bronze medalist(s)	Meghan Hunter	United States	BYU Cougars	1:59.03	
4	Michaela Rose	United States	LSU Tigers	1:59.47	
5	Lauren Tolbert	United States	Duke Blue Devils	1:59.88	
6	Smilla Kolbe	Germany	North Florida Ospreys	2:00.37	
7	Laura Pellicoro	Italy	Portland Pilots	2:00.84	
8	Veronica Hargrave	United States	Indiana Hoosiers	2:01.00	
9	Victoria Bossong	United States	Harvard Crimson	2:03.86	

==== 1500 meters ====
Placings in the women's 1500 meters at the 2025 NCAA Division I Outdoor Track and Field Championships
Rank	Athlete	Nationality	Team	Time	Notes
1st place, gold medalist(s)	Sophie O'Sullivan	Ireland	Washington Huskies	4:07.94	
2nd place, silver medalist(s)	Margot Appleton	United States	Virginia Cavaliers	4:08.99	
3rd place, bronze medalist(s)	Maggi Congdon	United States	Northern Arizona Lumberjacks	4:09.31	
4	Şilan Ayyıldız	Turkey	Oregon Ducks	4:09.75	
5	Klaudia Kazimierska	Poland	Oregon Ducks	4:10.42	
6	Kimberley May	New Zealand	Providence Friars	4:10.79 [.781]	
7	Lindsey Butler	United States	Virginia Tech Hokies	4:10.79 [.786]	
8	Chloe Foerster	United States	Washington Huskies	4:11.03	
9	Mena Scatchard	Great Britain	Princeton Tigers	4:11.04	
10	Salma Elbadra	Morocco	South Carolina Gamecocks	4:11.20	
11	Vera Sjöberg	Sweden	Boston University Terriers	4:12.52	
12	Mia Barnett	United States	Oregon Ducks	4:13.43	

==== 5000 meters ====
Placings in the women's 5000 meters at the 2025 NCAA Division I Outdoor Track and Field Championships
Rank	Athlete	Nationality	Team	Time	Notes
1st place, gold medalist(s)	Pamela Kosgei	Kenya	New Mexico Lobos	15:33.96	
2nd place, silver medalist(s)	Vera Sjöberg	Sweden	Boston University Terriers	15:34.77	
3rd place, bronze medalist(s)	Sophia Kennedy	United States	Stanford Cardinal	15:35.08	
4	Marion Jepngetich	Kenya	New Mexico Lobos	15:35.14	
5	Grace Hartman	United States	NC State Wolfpack	15:35.39	
6	Paitlyn Noe	United States	Arkansas Razorbacks	15:35.81	
7	Agnès McTighe	Switzerland	Northern Arizona Lumberjacks	15:35.87	
8	Amina Maatoug	Netherlands	Washington Huskies	15:35.93	
9	Silvia Jelelgo	Kenya	Clemson Tigers	15:36.34	
10	Alex Millard	Great Britain	Providence Friars	15:37.22	
11	Jenna Hutchins	United States	BYU Cougars	15:40.87	
12	Maelle Porcher	France	Iowa State Cyclones	15:41.76	
13	Margot Appleton	United States	Virginia Cavaliers	15:44.76	
14	Chloe Scrimgeour	United States	Georgetown Hoyas	15:46.18	
15	Isca Chelangat	Kenya	Oklahoma State Cowboys	15:48.66	
16	Florence Caron	Canada	Penn State Nittany Lions	15:49.72	
17	Zofia Dudek	Poland	Stanford Cardinal	15:53.91	
18	Rachel Forsyth	Canada	Michigan State Spartans	15:57.28	
19	Julia David-Smith	France	Washington Huskies	15:59.27	
20	Samantha Bush	United States	NC State Wolfpack	16:01.47	
21	Brenda Jepchirchir	Kenya	Auburn Tigers	16:01.99	
22	Ava Mitchell	United States	Northern Arizona Lumberjacks	16:06.32	
23	Sadie Sigfstead	Canada	Villanova Wildcats	16:06.70	
24	Edna Chelulei	United States	Eastern Kentucky Colonels	16:24.97	

==== 10000 meters ====
Placings in the women's 10000 meters at the 2025 NCAA Division I Outdoor Track and Field Championships
Rank	Athlete	Nationality	Team	Time	Notes
1st place, gold medalist(s)	Pamela Kosgei	Kenya	New Mexico Lobos	31:17.82	MR
2nd place, silver medalist(s)	Grace Hartman	United States	NC State Wolfpack	31:32.15	
3rd place, bronze medalist(s)	Joy Naukot	Kenya	West Virginia Mountaineers	31:34.34	
4	Paitlyn Noe	United States	Arkansas Razorbacks	31:36.91	
5	Chloe Scrimgeour	United States	Georgetown Hoyas	31:41.68	
6	Edna Chepkemoi	Kenya	LSU Tigers	32:10.75	
7	Rosina Machu	United States	Gonzaga Bulldogs	32:15.49	
8	Brenda Tuwei	Kenya	Alabama Crimson Tide	32:20.14	
9	Ruth White	United States	New Hampshire Wildcats	32:20.60	
10	Sydney Thorvaldson	United States	Arkansas Razorbacks	32:21.37	
11	Florence Caron	Canada	Penn State Nittany Lions	32:23.71	
12	Edna Chelulei	United States	Eastern Kentucky Colonels	32:23.94	
13	Sadie Sigfstead	Canada	Villanova Wildcats	32:40.13	
14	Brenda Jepchirchir	Kenya	Auburn Tigers	32:41.66	
15	Ali Weimer	United States	Minnesota Golden Gophers	32:42.31	
16	Jadyn Keeler	Canada	North Dakota Fighting Hawks	32:59.12	
17	Jenny Schilling	United States	Virginia Cavaliers	33:07.58	
18	Ruth Kimeli	Kenya	Baylor Bears	33:10.62	
19	Morgan Jensen	United States	Utah Utes	33:11.05	
20	Mckaylie Caesar	United States	Utah Utes	33:34.36	
21	Logan Hofstee	United States	Gonzaga Bulldogs	34:01.59	
22	Josphine Mwaura	Kenya	Oklahoma State Cowboys	35:09.22	
—	Diana Cherotich	Kenya	Oregon Ducks	DNF	
—	Hilda Olemomoi	Kenya	Florida Gators	DNS	

==== 100-meter hurdles ====
Placings in the women's 100-meter hurdles at the 2025 NCAA Division I Outdoor Track and Field Championships
Rank	Athlete	Nationality	Team	Time	Notes
1st place, gold medalist(s)	Aaliyah McCormick	United States	Oregon Ducks	12.81	
2nd place, silver medalist(s)	Jaiya Covington	United States	Texas A&M Aggies	12.93 [.928]	
3rd place, bronze medalist(s)	Marcia Sey	Great Britain	Howard Bison	12.93 [.930]	
4	Ana-Liese Torian	United States	Auburn Tigers	12.95	
5	Oneka Wilson	Jamaica	Clemson Tigers	13.02	
6	Janela Spencer	Jamaica	Ohio State Buckeyes	13.25	
—	Yanla Ndjip-Nyemeck	Belgium	UCLA Bruins	DNF	
—	Akala Garrett	United States	Texas Longhorns	DQ	15.6-2d
—	Habiba Harris	Jamaica	Florida Gators	DNS	
				Wind: (−0.2 m/s)	

==== 400-meter hurdles ====
Placings in the women's 400-meter hurdles at the 2025 NCAA Division I Outdoor Track and Field Championships
Rank	Athlete	Nationality	Team	Time	Notes
1st place, gold medalist(s)	Savannah Sutherland	Canada	Michigan Wolverines	52.46	CR
2nd place, silver medalist(s)	Akala Garrett	United States	Texas Longhorns	54.66	
3rd place, bronze medalist(s)	Michelle Smith	U.S. Virgin Islands	Georgia Bulldogs	55.20	
4	Sanaa Hebron	United States	Miami Hurricanes	55.46	
5	Tyra Wilson	United States	Florida State Seminoles	55.57	
6	Chloe Fair	United States	Harvard Crimson	55.81	
7	Amelliah Birdow	United States	TCU Horned Frogs	55.84	
8	Allyria McBride	United States	Vanderbilt Commodores	56.20	
9	Braelyn Baker	United States	Duke Blue Devils	56.54	

==== 3000-meter steeplechase ====
Placings in the women's 3000-meter steeplechase at the 2025 NCAA Division I Outdoor Track and Field Championships
Rank	Athlete	Nationality	Team	Time	Notes
1st place, gold medalist(s)	Doris Lemngole	Kenya	Alabama Crimson Tide	8:58.15	CR, PB
2nd place, silver medalist(s)	Lexy Halladay-Lowry	United States	BYU Cougars	9:08.68	PB
3rd place, bronze medalist(s)	Angelina Napoleon	United States	NC State Wolfpack	9:16.66	PB
4	Sarah Tait	Scotland	West Virginia Mountaineers	9:27.80	PB
5	Debora Cherono	Kenya	Texas A&M Aggies	9:32.10	PB
6	Kate Stewart-Barnett	Canada	Michigan State Spartans	9:33.21	PB
7	Shelby Jensen	United States	Utah State Aggies	9:36.61	PB
8	Leah Jeruto	Kenya	Oklahoma Sooners	9:38.94	
9	Taylor Lovell	United States	BYU Cougars	9:39.43	
10	Maggie Liebich	United States	Washington Huskies	9:50.77	
11	Emily Paupore	United States	Central Michigan Chippewas	9:54.94	
12	Karrie Baloga	United States	Northern Arizona Lumberjacks	9:57.43	

==== 4 × 100-meter relay ====
Placings in the women's 4 × 100-meter relay at the 2025 NCAA Division I Outdoor Track and Field Championships
Rank	Team	Time	Notes
1st place, gold medalist(s)	USC Trojans	42.22	SB
2nd place, silver medalist(s)	South Carolina Gamecocks	42.40	SB
3rd place, bronze medalist(s)	Texas A&M Aggies	42.89	SB
4	TCU Horned Frogs	42.97	
5	Texas Longhorns	42.98	
6	Howard Bison	43.23	
7	Florida State Seminoles	43.30	
8	LSU Lady Tigers	43.32	
	Florida Gators	DNF	

==== 4 × 400-meter relay ====
Placings in the women's 4 × 400-meter relay at the 2025 NCAA Division I Outdoor Track and Field Championships
Rank	Team	Time	Notes
1st place, gold medalist(s)	Georgia Bulldogs	3.23:62	SB, CL
2nd place, silver medalist(s)	Arkansas Razorbacks	3:24.25	
3rd place, bronze medalist(s)	USC Trojans	3:26.01	SB
4	Texas A&M Aggies	3:27.11	SB
5	Duke Blue Devils	3:27.40	SB
6	Iowa Hawkeyes	3:27.42	
7	UCLA Bruins	3:31.14	
8	Miami Hurricanes	3:47.22	
	South Carolina Gamecocks	DNS	

==== Long jump ====
Placings in the women's long jump at the 2025 NCAA Division I Outdoor Track and Field Championships
Rank	Athlete	Nationality	Team	1	2	3	4	5	6	Mark	Notes
1st place, gold medalist(s)	Synclair Savage	United States	Louisville Cardinals	6.57m (+0.8 m/s)	6.47m (+0.9 m/s)	x	6.59m (+2.3 m/s)	x	6.72m (+0.7 m/s)	6.72 m (22 ft 1/2 in) (+0.7 m/s)	PB
2nd place, silver medalist(s)	Alyssa Jones	United States	Stanford Cardinal	6.70m (+1.4 m/s)	x	m (+ m/s)	m (+ m/s)	x	m (+ m/s)	6.70 m (21 ft 11 3/4 in) (+1.4 m/s)	
3rd place, bronze medalist(s)	Lex Brown	United States	Baylor Bears	6.29 m (+1.1 m/s)	6.47 m (+0.5 m/s)	6.63 m (+0.7 m/s)	x	6.59 m (+0.3 m/s)	x	6.63 m (21 ft 9 in) (+0.7 m/s)	
4	Tacoria Humphery	United States	Illinois Fighting Illini	6.61 m (+2.7 m/s)	x	6.33 m (+1.5 m/s)	x	6.52 m (+0.6 m/s)	6.62 m (+0.1 m/s)	6.62 m (21 ft 8 1/2 in) (+0.1 m/s)	
5	Anthaya Charlton	Bahamas	Florida Gators	x	6.58 m (+1.8 m/s)	x	x	x	x	6.58 m (21 ft 7 in) (+1.8 m/s)	
6	Sophia Beckmon	United States	Illinois Fighting Illini	x	x	6.49 m (+1.9 m/s)	x	6.34 m (+0.6 m/s)	x	6.49 m (21 ft 3 1/2 in) (+1.9 m/s)	
7	Aaliyah Foster	Jamaica	Texas Longhorns	6.20 m (+2.0 m/s)	6.47 m (+2.6 m/s)	4.77 m (+1.1 m/s)	x	5.98 m (+0.6 m/s)	6.19 m (+1.1 m/s)	6.47 m (21 ft 2 1/2 in) (+2.6 m/s)	
8	Prestina Ochonogor	Nigeria	Tarleton State Texans	6.28 m (+1.1 m/s)	6.29 m (+1.4 m/s)	6.41 m (+0.8 m/s)	6.02 m (+1.9 m/s)	4.18 m (+0.4 m/s)	6.04 m (+1.7 m/s)	6.41 m (21 ft 1/4 in) (+0.8 m/s)	
9	Mariia Horielova	Ukraine	Alabama Crimson Tide	x	x	6.39 m (+1.6 m/s)	x	x	x	6.39 m (20 ft 11 1/2 in) (+1.6 m/s)	
10	Jenica Bosko	United States	Arizona Wildcats	5.84 m (+1.1 m/s)	6.29 m (+1.1 m/s)	6.27 m (+0.1 m/s)				6.29 m (20 ft 7 1/2 in) (+1.1 m/s)	
11	Georgina Scoot	Bulgaria	Princeton Tigers	6.02 m (+0.8 m/s)	x	6.21 m (+0.5 m/s)				6.21 m (20 ft 4 1/4 in) (+0.5 m/s)	
12	Janae De Gannes	Trinidad and Tobago	Baylor Bears	x	5.81 m (+2.0 m/s)	6.18 m (+0.2 m/s)				6.18 m (20 ft 3 1/4 in) (+0.2 m/s)	
13	Marta Amouhin Amani	Italy	Harvard Crimson	5.81 m (+0.6 m/s)	6.17 m (+1.8 m/s)	x				6.17 m (20 ft 2 3/4 in) (+1.8 m/s)	
14	Sydney Johnson	United States	UCLA Bruins	x	6.10 m (+4.2 m/s)	6.15 m (+1.8 m/s)				6.15 m (20 ft 2 in) (+1.8 m/s)	
15	Shalom Olotu	United States	Kansas State Wildcats	5.60 m (+0.7 m/s)	5.81 m (−0.2 m/s)	6.14 m (+1.6 m/s)				6.14 m (20 ft 1 1/2 in) (+1.6 m/s)	
16	Alyssa Banales	United States	Florida Gators	6.04 m (+0.8 m/s)	x	6.10 m (+0.3 m/s)				6.10 m (20 ft 0 in) (+0.3 m/s)	
17	Paige Floriea	United States	Rutgers Scarlet Knights	x	5.81 m (+1.2 m/s)	6.05 m (+0.6 m/s)				6.05 m (19 ft 10 in) (+0.6 m/s)	
18	Imani Moore	United States	Georgia Southern Eagles	x	x	6.02 m (+0.9 m/s)				6.02 m (19 ft 9 in) (+0.9 m/s)	
19	Funminiyi Olajide	Great Britain	Arkansas Razorbacks	x	x	6.01 m (+1.4 m/s)				6.01 m (19 ft 8 1/2 in) (+1.4 m/s)	
20	Hailey Coey	United States	Montana State Bobcats	5.89m (+0.5 m/s)	5.85 m (+1.0 m/s)	6.00 m (+0.1 m/s)				6.00 m (19 ft 8 in) (+0.1 m/s)	
21	Julia Sue-Kam-Ling	United States	Jacksonville Dolphins	5.85 m (+2.1 m/s)	x	5.92m (+2.8 m/s)				5.92 m (19 ft 5 in) (+2.8 m/s)	
22	Ella Scally	United States	Miami RedHawks	x	5.92m (+1.4 m/s)	5.78m (+0.7 m/s)				5.92 m (19 ft 5 in) (+1.4 m/s)	
23	Hunt Mariama	United States	NC State Wolfpack	x	5.87m (+0.4 m/s)	x				5.87 m (19 ft 3 in) (+0.4 m/s)	
—	Molly Wise	United States	Richmond Spiders	x	x	x				NM	

==== Triple jump ====
Placings in the women's triple jump at the 2025 NCAA Division I Outdoor Track and Field Championships
Rank	Athlete	Nationality	Team	Mark	Notes
1st place, gold medalist(s)	Winny Bii	Kenya	Texas A&M Aggies	13.96 m (45 ft 9 1/2 in) (+0.0 m/s)	
2nd place, silver medalist(s)	Emilia Sjöstrand	Sweden	San Jose State Spartans	13.88 m (45 ft 6 1/4 in) (+0.5 m/s)	
3rd place, bronze medalist(s)	Agur Dwol	United States	Oklahoma Sooners	13.77 m (45 ft 2 in) (+1.4 m/s)	
4	Shantae Foreman	Jamaica	Clemson Tigers	13.72 m (45 ft 0 in) (+1.3 m/s)	
5	Victoria Gorlova	Russia	Texas Tech Red Raiders	13.53 m (44 ft 4 1/2 in) (+0.6 m/s)	
6	Skylynn Townsend	United States	Georgia Bulldogs	13.52 m (44 ft 4 1/4 in) (+0.4 m/s)	
7	Ashley Moore	United States	Oklahoma Sooners	13.30 m (43 ft 7 1/2 in) (+1.8 m/s)	
8	Ryann Porter	United States	Oregon Ducks	13.22 m (43 ft 4 1/4 in) (+1.1 m/s)	
9	Asia Phillips	Canada	Florida Gators	13.13 m (43 ft 3/4 in) (+0.9 m/s)	
10	Tamiah Washington	United States	Texas Tech Red Raiders	13.06 m (42 ft 10 in) (−0.5 m/s)	
11	Christina Warren	United States	Miami Hurricanes	13.03 m (42 ft 8 3/4 in) (+1.2 m/s)	
12	Shalom Olotu	United States	Kansas State Wildcats	13.02 m (42 ft 8 1/2 in) (+0.4 m/s)	
13	Sharvari Parulekar	India	Louisville Cardinals	13.01 m (42 ft 8 in) (+2.7 m/s)	
14	Simone Johnson	United States	San Jose State Spartans	13.01 m (42 ft 8 in) (+0.6 m/s)	
15	Kayla Pinkard	United States	Florida State Seminoles	12.98 m (42 ft 7 in) (+1.6 m/s)	
16	Rachela Pace	Malta	UTSA Roadrunners	12.92 m (42 ft 4 1/2 in) (+0.7 m/s)	
17	Cameran Gist	United States	South Carolina Gamecocks	12.90 m (42 ft 3 3/4 in) (+2.4 m/s)	
18	Daniela Wamokpego	France	Iowa Hawkeyes	12.71 m (41 ft 8 1/4 in) (+2.4 m/s)	
19	Machaeda Linton	Jamaica	LSU Tigers	12.67 m (41 ft 6 3/4 in) (+1.0 m/s)	
20	Jada Joseph	United States	Brown Bears	12.58 m (41 ft 3 1/4 in) (+0.9 m/s)	
21	Georgina Scoot	Great Britain	Princeton Tigers	12.56 m (41 ft 2 1/4 in) (+1.1 m/s)	
22	Katharina Gråman	Sweden	San Jose State Spartans	12.52 m (41 ft 3/4 in) (+2.1 m/s)	
23	Olivia Dowd	United States	North Carolina A&T Aggies	12.46 m (40 ft 10 1/2 in) (+0.5 m/s)	
24	Sophie Galloway	United States	Kentucky Wildcats	12.42 m (40 ft 8 3/4 in) (+1.6 m/s)	

==== High jump ====
Placings in the women's high jump at the 2025 NCAA Division I Outdoor Track and Field Championships
Rank	Athlete	Nationality	Team	1.74	1.79	1.84	1.87	1.90	1.93	1.96	2.00	Mark	Notes
1st place, gold medalist(s)	Elena Kulichenko	Cyprus	Georgia Bulldogs	–	–	o	o	o	o	o	xxx	1.96 m (6 ft 5 in)	
2nd place, silver medalist(s)	Rose Amoanimaa Yeboah	Ghana	Illinois Fighting Illini	–	o	xo	o	xxo	xo	xxx		1.93 m (6 ft 3 3/4 in)	
3rd place, bronze medalist(s)	Jenna Rogers	United States	Nebraska Cornhuskers	–	o	o	xo	o	xxx			1.90 m (6 ft 2 3/4 in)	
4	Alyssa Jones	United States	Stanford Cardinal	o	o	o	o	xxo	xxx			1.90 m (6 ft 2 3/4 in)	
5	Temitope Adeshina	Nigeria	Texas Tech Red Raiders	–	o	o	o	o	xxx			1.87 m (6 ft 1 1/2 in)	
6	Kristi Perez-Snyman	South Africa	Missouri Tigers	xo	o	o	xo	xxx				1.87 m (6 ft 1 1/2 in)	
7	Celia Rifaterra	Spain	Virginia Cavaliers	o	o	o	xxx					1.84 m (6 ft 1/4 in)	
8	Valentina Fakrogha	United States	UCLA Bruins	xo	xxo	o	xxx					1.84 m (6 ft 1/4 in)	
9	Ajia Hughes	United States	Southern Utah Thunderbirds	o	o	xo	xxx					1.84 m (6 ft 1/4 in)	
9	Spirit Morgan	United States	North Carolina A&T Aggies	o	o	xo	xxx					1.84 m (6 ft 1/4 in)	
11	Claudina Diaz	Mexico	Missouri Tigers	xo	o	xo	xxx					1.84 m (6 ft 1/4 in)	
12	Eva Baldursdottir	Iceland	Pittsburgh Panthers	o	xo	xxo	xxx					1.84 m (6 ft 1/4 in)	
13	Cheyla Scott	United States	South Carolina Gamecocks	–	o	xxx						1.79 m (5 ft 10 1/4 in)	
13	Miracle Ailes	United States	Alabama Crimson Tide	o	o	xxx						1.79 m (5 ft 10 1/4 in)	
13	Diamonasia Taylor	United States	Murray State Racers	o	o	xxx						1.79 m (5 ft 10 1/4 in)	
16	Amaya Ugarte	United States	Ohio State Buckeyes	o	xo	xxx						1.79 m (5 ft 10 1/4 in)	
16	Zharia Taylor	United States	UC Irvine Anteaters	o	xo	xxx						1.79 m (5 ft 10 1/4 in)	
18	María Arboleda	Colombia	Iowa Hawkeyes	o	xxo	xxx						1.79 m (5 ft 10 1/4 in)	
19	Sharie Enoe	Grenada	Kansas State Wildcats	o	xxx							1.74 m (5 ft 8 1/2 in)	
19	Kendall Ward	United States	Georgia Tech Yellow Jackets	o	xxx							1.74 m (5 ft 8 1/2 in)	
19	Carly Tarentino	United States	Virginia Cavaliers	o	xxx							1.74 m (5 ft 8 1/2 in)	
19	Zahra Amos	Australia	Buffalo Bulls	o	xxx							1.74 m (5 ft 8 1/2 in)	
23	Svenia De Coninck	Belgium	Kent State Golden Flashes	xxo	xxx							1.74 m (5 ft 8 1/2 in)	
23	Alice Taylor	New Zealand	Rice Owls	xxo	xxx							1.74 m (5 ft 8 1/2 in)	

==== Pole vault ====
Placings in the women's pole vault the 2025 NCAA Division I Outdoor Track and Field Championships
Rank	Athlete	Nationality	Team	Mark	Notes
1st place, gold medalist(s)	Hana Moll	United States	Washington Huskies	4.79 m (15 ft 8 1/2 in)	CR
2nd place, silver medalist(s)	Chloe Timberg	United States	Rutgers Scarlet Knights	4.49 m (14 ft 8 3/4 in)	
3rd place, bronze medalist(s)	Amanda Moll	United States	Washington Huskies	4.49 m (14 ft 8 3/4 in)	
4	Erica Ellis	United States	Kansas Jayhawks	4.44 m (14 ft 6 3/4 in)	
4	Anna Willis	United States	South Dakota Coyotes	4.44 m (14 ft 6 3/4 in)	
6	Emily Fitzsimmons	United States	Oregon Ducks	4.44 m (14 ft 6 3/4 in)	
7	Gennifer Hirata	United States	South Dakota Coyotes	4.44 m (14 ft 6 3/4 in)	
8	Mia Morello	United States	Illinois Fighting Illini	4.39 m (14 ft 4 3/4 in)	
8	Molly Haywood	United States	Baylor Bears	4.39 m (14 ft 4 3/4 in)	
10	Sydney Horn	United States	High Point Panthers	4.39 m (14 ft 4 3/4 in)	
11	Johanna Duplantis	Sweden	LSU Tigers	4.39 m (14 ft 4 3/4 in)	
12	Ashley Callahan	United States	Louisville Cardinals	4.24 m (13 ft 10 3/4 in)	
12	Ka'Leila Abrolle	United States	UCLA Bruins	4.24 m (13 ft 10 3/4 in)	
12	Sara Schmitt	United States	Tennessee Volunteers	4.24 m (13 ft 10 3/4 in)	
12	Carly Pujol	United States	Arkansas State Red Wolves	4.24 m (13 ft 10 3/4 in)	
16	Chiara Sistermann	Germany	Virginia Tech Hokies	4.24 m (13 ft 10 3/4 in)	
17	Lilly Nichols	Poland	Appalachian State Mountaineers	4.24 m (13 ft 10 3/4 in)	
17	Lyndsey Reed	United States	Virginia Tech Hokies	4.24 m (13 ft 10 3/4 in)	
17	Julia Fixsen	United States	Virginia Tech Hokies	4.24 m (13 ft 10 3/4 in)	
20	Gemma Tutton	Great Britain	Duke Blue Devils	4.09 m (13 ft 5 in)	
20	Payton Phillips	United States	Kentucky Wildcats	4.09 m (13 ft 5 in)	
20	Alysaa Quinones-Mixon	Puerto Rico	Auburn Tigers	4.09 m (13 ft 5 in)	
—	Tenly Kuhn	United States	Baylor Bears	NM	
—	Katerina Adamiec	United States	UCLA Bruins	NM	

==== Shot put ====
Placings in the women's shot put at the 2025 NCAA Division I Outdoor Track and Field Championships
Rank	Athlete	Nationality	Team	Mark	Notes
1st place, gold medalist(s)	Mya Lesnar	United States	Colorado State Rams	19.01 m (62 ft 4 1/4 in)	
2nd place, silver medalist(s)	Abria Smith	United States	Illinois Fighting Illini	18.85 m (61 ft 10 in)	
3rd place, bronze medalist(s)	Nina Ndubuisi	Germany	Texas Longhorns	18.50 m (60 ft 8 1/4 in)	
4	Jayden Ulrich	United States	Louisville Cardinals	18.26 m (59 ft 10 3/4 in)	
5	Ashley Erasmus	South Africa	USC Trojans	17.99 m (59 ft 1/4 in)	
6	Kelsie Murrell-Ross	Grenada	Georgia Bulldogs	17.80 m (58 ft 4 3/4 in)	
7	Mye'Joi Williams	United States	Alabama Crimson Tide	17.73 m (58 ft 2 in)	
8	Cierra Jackson	United States	Fresno State Bulldogs	17.70 m (58 ft 3/4 in)	
9	Alida van Daalen	Netherlands	Florida Gators	17.26 m (56 ft 7 1/2 in)	
10	Gracelyn Leiseth	United States	Florida Gators	17.23 m (56 ft 6 1/4 in)	
11	Chrystal Herpin	United States	Texas Longhorns	17.19 m (56 ft 4 3/4 in)	
12	Akaoma Odeluga	United States	Ole Miss Rebels	17.14 m (56 ft 2 3/4 in)	
13	Megan Hague	United States	Auburn Tigers	17.07 m (56 ft 0 in)	
14	Elizabeth Tapper	United States	Michigan Wolverines	16.97 m (55 ft 8 in)	
15	Makayla Hunter	United States	Indiana Hoosiers	16.86 m (55 ft 3 3/4 in)	
16	Tapenisa Havea	New Zealand	Arizona Wildcats	16.67 m (54 ft 8 1/4 in)	
17	Kalynn Meyer	United States	Nebraska Cornhuskers	16.66 m (54 ft 7 3/4 in)	
18	Melanie Duron	United States	Texas State Bobcats	16.59 m (54 ft 5 in)	
19	Kellyn Kortemeyer	United States	Nebraska Cornhuskers	16.58 m (54 ft 4 3/4 in)	
20	Treneese Hamilton	Dominica	Alabama Crimson Tide	16.52 m (54 ft 2 1/4 in)	
21	Abigail Russell	United States	Michigan Wolverines	16.38 m (53 ft 8 3/4 in)	
22	Lucija Leko	Croatia	California Golden Bears	16.25 m (53 ft 3 3/4 in)	
23	Amanda Ngandu-Ntumba	France	Cincinnati Bearcats	16.05 m (52 ft 7 3/4 in)	
24	Gretchen Hoekstre	United States	BYU Cougars	15.88 m (52 ft 1 in)	

==== Discus throw ====
Placings in the women's discus throw at the 2025 NCAA Division I Outdoor Track and Field Championships
Rank	Athlete	Nationality	Team	Mark	Notes
1st place, gold medalist(s)	Cierra Jackson	United States	Fresno State Bulldogs	65.82 m (215 ft 11 1/4 in)	
2nd place, silver medalist(s)	Alida van Daalen	Netherlands	Florida Gators	64.94 m (213 ft 1/2 in)	
3rd place, bronze medalist(s)	Shelby Frank	United States	Texas Tech Red Raiders	63.37 m (207 ft 10 3/4 in)	
4	Caisa-Marie Lindfors	Sweden	California Golden Bears	62.57 m (205 ft 3 1/4 in)	
5	Amanda Ngandu-Ntumba	France	Cincinnati Bearcats	60.77 m (199 ft 4 1/2 in)	
6	Adrienne Adams	Jamaica	Auburn Tigers	60.55 m (198 ft 7 3/4 in)	
7	Jayden Ulrich	United States	Louisville Cardinals	60.25 m (197 ft 8 in)	
8	Michaelle Valentin	United States	FIU Panthers	59.67 m (195 ft 9 in)	
9	Estel Valeanu	Israel	Virginia Cavaliers	58.22 m (191 ft 0 in)	
10	Ines Lopez	Spain	Arizona State Sun Devils	57.36 m (188 ft 2 1/4 in)	
11	Princesse Hyman	France	LSU Tigers	56.50 m (185 ft 4 1/4 in)	
12	Sofia Sluchaninova	Russia	Kansas Jayhawks	56.30 m (184 ft 8 1/2 in)	
13	Zoe Burleson	United States	Texas Tech Red Raiders	55.83 m (183 ft 2 in)	
14	Milina Wepiwe	Germany	Harvard Crimson	55.64 m (182 ft 6 1/2 in)	
15	Jade Whitfield	United States	Louisville Cardinals	55.25 m (181 ft 3 in)	
16	Donna Douglas	United States	Tennessee Volunteers	54.90 m (180 ft 1 1/4 in)	
17	Tamaiah Koonce	United States	Kansas State Wildcats	54.85 m (179 ft 11 1/4 in)	
18	Krishna Jayasankar Menon	India	UNLV Rebels	52.99 m (173 ft 10 in)	
19	Jamora Alves	Grenada	St. John's Red Storm	52.60 m (172 ft 6 3/4 in)	
20	Taylor Kesner	United States	Wisconsin Badgers	52.01 m (170 ft 7 1/2 in)	
21	Paige Low	United States	Oklahoma Sooners	51.53 m (169 ft 1/2 in)	
22	Gretchen Hoekstre	United States	BYU Cougars	50.46 m (165 ft 6 1/2 in)	
23	Angeludi Asaah	United States	Penn Quakers	50.33 m (165 ft 1 1/4 in)	
—	Klaire Kovatch	United States	Colorado State Rams	NM	

==== Javelin throw ====
Placings in the women's javelin throw at the 2025 NCAA Division I Outdoor Track and Field Championships
Rank	Athlete	Nationality	Team	Mark	Notes
1st place, gold medalist(s)	Valentina Barrios	Colombia	Missouri Tigers	62.00 m (203 ft 4 3/4 in)	NU23R
2nd place, silver medalist(s)	Manuela Rotundo	Uruguay	Georgia Bulldogs	60.35 m (197 ft 11 3/4 in)	
3rd place, bronze medalist(s)	Irene Jepkemboi	Kenya	TCU Horned Frogs	60.31 m (197 ft 10 1/4 in)	
4	Lianna Davidson	Australia	Georgia Bulldogs	59.03 m (193 ft 8 in)	
5	Maddie Harris	United States	Nebraska Cornhuskers	58.36 m (191 ft 5 1/2 in)	
6	Jana van Schalkwyk	South Africa	UCLA Bruins	57.07 m (187 ft 2 3/4 in)	
7	McKyla van der Westhuizen	South Africa	Rice Owls	56.65 m (185 ft 10 1/4 in)	
8	Kelsi Oldroyd	United States	Utah Valley Wolverines	56.37 m (184 ft 11 1/4 in)	
9	Kate Joyce	United States	North Carolina Tar Heels	56.03 m (183 ft 9 3/4 in)	
10	Shea Greene	United States	Princeton Tigers	55.64 m (182 ft 6 1/2 in)	
11	Lilly Urban	Germany	Nevada Wolf Pack	55.27 m (181 ft 3 3/4 in)	
12	Evelyn Bliss	United States	Bucknell Bison	55.09 m (180 ft 8 3/4 in)	
13	Elizabeth Korczak	Great Britain	Iowa Hawkeyes	53.18 m (174 ft 5 1/2 in)	
14	Maria Bienvenu	United States	TCU Horned Frogs	52.87 m (173 ft 5 1/4 in)	
15	Eniko Sara	Canada	Nebraska Cornhuskers	52.18 m (171 ft 2 1/4 in)	
16	Megan Albamonti	United States	Alabama Crimson Tide	50.91 m (167 ft 1/4 in)	
17	Emma Yungberg	United States	Michigan Wolverines	50.88 m (166 ft 11 in)	
18	Erin McMeniman	United States	Georgia Bulldogs	50.11 m (164 ft 4 3/4 in)	
19	Arndis Oskarsdottir	Iceland	FIU Panthers	49.96 m (163 ft 10 3/4 in)	
20	Sara Sanders	United States	Oregon State Beavers	48.47 m (159 ft 1/4 in)	
21	Deisiane Teixeira	Brazil	Miami Hurricanes	48.03 m (157 ft 6 3/4 in)	
22	Taylor Kesner	United States	Wisconsin Badgers	47.43 m (155 ft 7 1/4 in)	
23	Trinity Spooner	United States	LSU Tigers	46.05 m (151 ft 3/4 in)	
24	Beatriz Mora Herencia	Spain	Albany Great Danes	43.83 m (143 ft 9 1/2 in)	

==== Hammer throw ====
Placings in the women's hammer throw at the 2025 NCAA Division I Outdoor Track and Field Championships
Rank	Athlete	Nationality	Team	Mark	Notes
1st place, gold medalist(s)	Stephanie Ratcliffe	Australia	Georgia Bulldogs	71.37 m (234 ft 1 3/4 in)	
2nd place, silver medalist(s)	Shelby Frank	United States	Texas Tech Red Raiders	71.05 m (233 ft 1 in)	
3rd place, bronze medalist(s)	Lara Roberts	Australia	Texas State Bobcats	70.42 m (231 ft 1/4 in)	
4	Emma Robbins	United States	Oklahoma State Cowgirls	69.27 m (227 ft 3 in)	
5	Giavonna Meeks	United States	California Golden Bears	68.94 m (226 ft 2 in)	
6	Gudrun Hallgrimsdottir	Iceland	VCU Rams	68.66 m (225 ft 3 in)	
7	Kenna Curry	United States	North Dakota Fighting Hawks	68.16 m (223 ft 7 1/4 in)	
8	Chloe Lindeman	United States	Wisconsin Badgers	67.82 m (222 ft 6 in)	
9	Emilia Kolokotroni	Cyprus	Harvard Crimson	67.82 m (222 ft 6 in)	
10	Valentina Savva	Cyprus	California Golden Bears	66.84 m (219 ft 3 1/4 in)	
11	Mariana Pestana	Portugal	Virginia Tech Hokies	66.41 m (217 ft 10 1/2 in)	
12	Monique Hardy	United States	Kansas State Wildcats	65.17 m (213 ft 9 1/2 in)	
13	Kali Terza	United States	Kennesaw State Owls	64.98 m (213 ft 2 1/4 in)	
14	Annika Kelly	United States	Virginia Cavaliers	64.87 m (212 ft 9 3/4 in)	
15	Chioma Njoku	United States	Maryland Terrapins	64.86 m (212 ft 9 1/2 in)	
16	Paola Bueno Calvillo	Mexico	Liberty Lady Flames	64.78 m (212 ft 6 1/4 in)	
17	Marie Rougetet	France	Mississippi State Bulldogs	64.66 m (212 ft 1 1/2 in)	
18	Audrey Jacobs	Netherlands	California Golden Bears	63.74 m (209 ft 1 1/4 in)	
19	Kassidy Gallagher	United States	Oklahoma Sooners	63.47 m (208 ft 2 3/4 in)	
20	Kennedy Clarke	United States	Oklahoma Sooners	63.36 m (207 ft 10 1/4 in)	
21	Kajsa Borrman	United States	Colorado State Rams	63.19 m (207 ft 3 3/4 in)	
22	Emily Fink	United States	Army Black Knights	62.20 m (204 ft 3/4 in)	
23	Kate Powers	United States	Kentucky Wildcats	60.10 m (197 ft 2 in)	
	Skylar Soli	United States	Ole Miss Rebels	NM	

==== Heptathlon ====
Placings in the women's heptathlon at the 2025 NCAA Division I Outdoor Track and Field Championships
Rank	Athlete	Nationality	Team	Overall points	100 m	HJ	SP	200 m	LJ	JT	800 m
1st place, gold medalist(s)	Pippi Lotta Enok	Estonia	Oklahoma Sooners	6285 NR	1028; 13.65	991; 1.81 m (5 ft 11 1/4 in)	694; 12.50 m (41 ft 0 in)	972; 24.09	972; 6.39 m (20 ft 11 1/2 in)	723; 42.89 m (140 ft 8 1/2 in)	905; 2:14.12
2nd place, silver medalist(s)	Jadin O'Brien	United States	Notre Dame Fighting Irish	6256	1075; 13.33	842; 1.69 m (5 ft 6 1/2 in)	823; 14.44 m (47 ft 4 1/2 in)	970; 24.11	896; 6.15 m (20 ft 2 in)	720; 42.75 m (140 ft 3 in)	930; 2:12.42
3rd place, bronze medalist(s)	Sophia Yakushina	Russia	Texas A&M Aggies	6058	1046; 13.53	842; 1.69 m (5 ft 6 1/2 in)	625; 11.46 m (37 ft 7 in)	979; 24.02	997; 6.47 m (21 ft 2 1/2 in)	675; 40.38 m (132 ft 5 3/4 in)	894; 2:14.93
4	Melissa Wullschleger	Switzerland	Illinois Fighting Illini	5928	1014; 13.75	806; 1.66 m (5 ft 5 1/4 in)	768; 13.61 m (44 ft 7 3/4 in)	915; 24.70	837; 5.96 m (19 ft 6 1/2 in)	748; 44.20 m (145 ft 0 in)	840; 2:18.82
5	Alaina Brady	United States	Notre Dame Fighting Irish	5875	1063; 13.41	806; 1.66 m (5 ft 5 1/4 in)	787; 13.89 m (45 ft 6 3/4 in)	857; 25.33	804; 5.85 m (19 ft 2 1/4 in)	706; 42.02 m (137 ft 10 1/4 in)	852; 2:17.95
6	Sofia Cosculluela	Spain	Washington Huskies	5856	1053; 13.48	736; 1.60 m (5 ft 2 3/4 in)	707; 12.69 m (41 ft 7 1/2 in)	902; 24.83	837; 5.96 m (19 ft 6 1/2 in)	840; 48.97 m (160 ft 7 3/4 in)	781; 2:23.14
7	Izzy Goudros	Canada	Harvard Crimson	5853	1034; 13.61	736; 1.60 m (5 ft 2 3/4 in)	617; 11.33 m (37 ft 2 in)	1018; 23.61	972; 6.39 m (20 ft 11 1/2 in)	572; 35.00 m (114 ft 9 3/4 in)	904; 2:14.19
8	Katelyn Adel	Switzerland	Alabama Crimson Tide	5834	961; 14.12	879; 1.72 m (5 ft 7 1/2 in)	701; 12.60 m (41 ft 4 in)	919; 24.65	905; 6.18 m (20 ft 3 1/4 in)	602; 36.57 m (119 ft 11 3/4 in)	867; 2:16.85
9	Maddie Pitts	United States	Penn State Nittany Lions	5778	1015; 13.74	879; 1.72 m (5 ft 7 1/2 in)	669; 12.12 m (39 ft 9 in)	994; 23.86	795; 5.82 m (19 ft 1 in)	497; 31.06 m (101 ft 10 3/4 in)	929; 2:12.47
10	Destiny Masters	United States	Wichita State Shockers	5763	946; 14.23	1029; 1.84 m (6 ft 1/4 in)	759; 13.48 m (44 ft 2 1/2 in)	838; 25.54	786; 5.79 m (18 ft 11 3/4 in)	753; 44.45 m (145 ft 10 in)	652; 2:33.30
11	Juliette Laracuente-Huebner	United States	Cincinnati Bearcats	5703	1028; 13.65	916; 1.75 m (5 ft 8 3/4 in)	602; 11.11 m (36 ft 5 1/4 in)	928; 24.56	828; 5.93 m (19 ft 5 1/4 in)	509; 31.73 m (104 ft 1 in)	892; 2:15.07
12	Annie Molenhouse	United States	Oklahoma State Cowboys	5669	987; 13.94	806; 1.66 m (5 ft 5 1/4 in)	682; 12.32 m (40 ft 5 in)	968; 24.13	665; 5.38 m (17 ft 7 3/4 in)	691; 41.25 m (135 ft 4 in)	870; 2:16.63
13	Mia Guldteig Lien	Norway	UTSA Roadrunners	5648	967; 14.08	953; 1.78 m (5 ft 10 in)	582; 10.80 m (35 ft 5 in)	840; 25.52	921; 6.23 m (20 ft 5 1/4 in)	485; 30.42 m (99 ft 9 1/2 in)	900; 2:14.47
14	Sydney Johnson	United States	UCLA Bruins	5635	1008; 13.79	736; 1.60 m (5 ft 2 3/4 in)	676; 12.23 m (40 ft 1 1/4 in)	947; 24.35	956; 6.34 m (20 ft 9 1/2 in)	527; 32.63 m (107 ft 1/2 in)	785; 2:22.89
15	Maresa Hense	Germany	UConn Huskies	5608	998; 13.86	771; 1.63 m (5 ft 4 in)	686; 12.37 m (40 ft 7 in)	955; 24.27	798; 5.83 m (19 ft 1 1/2 in)	496; 31.02 m (101 ft 9 1/4 in)	904; 2:14.21
16	Jalen Elrod	United States	Purdue Boilermakers	5594	1018; 13.72	701; 1.57 m (5 ft 1 3/4 in)	636; 11.62 m (38 ft 1 1/4 in)	981; 24.00	843; 5.98 m (19 ft 7 1/4 in)	470; 29.63 m (97 ft 2 1/2 in)	945; 2:11.37
17	Lucy Fellows	Great Britain	Louisville Cardinals	5557	946; 14.23	806; 1.66 m (5 ft 5 1/4 in)	711; 12.76 m (41 ft 10 1/4 in)	922; 24.62	732; 5.61 m (18 ft 4 3/4 in)	647; 38.92 m (127 ft 8 1/4 in)	793; 2:22.25
18	Shelby Grover	United States	Kent State Golden Flashes	5501	993; 13.90	771; 1.63 m (5 ft 4 in)	746; 13.28 m (43 ft 6 3/4 in)	856; 25.34	747; 5.66 m (18 ft 6 3/4 in)	611; 37.04 m (121 ft 6 1/4 in)	777; 2:23.48
19	Ella Spaulding	United States	Fresno State Bulldogs	5371	966; 14.09	842; 1.69 m (5 ft 6 1/2 in)	536; 10.10 m (33 ft 1 1/2 in)	919; 24.65	628; 5.25 m (17 ft 2 1/2 in)	643; 38.74 m (127 ft 1 in)	837; 2:18.99
20	Clare McNamara	Malta	Michigan Wolverines	4980	847; 14.96	736; 1.60 m (5 ft 2 3/4 in)	733; 13.09 m (42 ft 11 1/4 in)	809; 25.86	640; 5.29 m (17 ft 4 1/4 in)	296; 20.36 m (66 ft 9 1/2 in)	919; 2:13.17
21	Claudine Raud-Gumiel	France	Long Beach State Beach	4577	1027; 13.66	842; 1.69 m (5 ft 6 1/2 in)	552; 10.35 m (33 ft 11 1/4 in)	888; 24.99	0 NM	486; 30.52 m (100 ft 1 1/2 in)	782; 2:23.07
—	Lucie Lienast	Germany	Illinois Fighting Illini	—	931; 14.34	842; 1.69 m (5 ft 6 1/2 in)	718; 12.86 m (42 ft 2 1/4 in)	916; 24.68	0 NM	0 NM	0 DNS
—	Annika Williams	United States	Oregon Ducks	—	984; 13.96	916; 1.75 m (5 ft 8 3/4 in)	802; 14.12 m (46 ft 3 3/4 in)	843; 25.48	801; 5.84 m (19 ft 1 3/4 in)	719; 42.67 m (139 ft 11 3/4 in)	0 DNS
—	Kenli Nettles	United States	Ball State Cardinals	—	976; 14.02	771; 1.63 m (5 ft 4 in)	627; 11.48 m (37 ft 7 3/4 in)	920; 24.64	0 DNS	0 DNS	0 DNS

== Standings ==
Top 10 men's team scores at the 2025 NCAA Division I Outdoor Track and Field Championships
Rank	Team	Score
(gold) (tie)	Texas A&M Aggies	41
(gold) (tie)	USC Trojans	41
3rd place, bronze medalist(s)	Arkansas Razorbacks	40
4	Auburn Tigers	35
5	New Mexico Lobos	31
6	Oklahoma Sooners	30.5
7	Minnesota Golden Gophers	25
8 (tie)	Florida Gators	22
8 (tie)	Kentucky Wildcats	22
8 (tie)	Ole Miss Rebels	22

Top 10 women's team scores at the 2025 NCAA Division I Outdoor Track and Field Championships
Rank	Team	Score
1st place, gold medalist(s)	Georgia Bulldogs	73
2nd place, silver medalist(s)	USC Trojans	47
3rd place, bronze medalist(s)	Texas A&M Aggies	43
4	Washington Huskies	31
5	Illinois Fighting Illini	29.5
6	Stanford Cardinal	29
7	South Carolina Gamecocks	28
8	Arkansas Razorbacks	26
9	New Mexico Lobos	25
10	Oregon Ducks	23
10	Texas Longhorns	23

== Schedule ==
Schedule of the 2025 NCAA Division I Outdoor Track and Field Championships
Date	Category	Time (ET)	Event	Round division
Wednesday, June 11	Track events	4:32 p.m.	4×100 relay	Semifinal men
Wednesday, June 11	Track events	4:46 p.m.	1500 meters	Semifinal men
Wednesday, June 11	Track events	5:02 p.m.	3000 steeplechase	Semifinal men
Wednesday, June 11	Track events	5:32 p.m.	110 meter hurdles	Semifinal men
Wednesday, June 11	Track events	5:46 p.m.	100 meters	Semifinal men
Wednesday, June 11	Track events	6:00 p.m.	400 meters	Semifinal men
Wednesday, June 11	Track events	6:14 p.m.	800 meters	Semifinal men
Wednesday, June 11	Track events	6:30 p.m.	400 meter hurdles	Semifinal men
Wednesday, June 11	Track events	6:44 p.m.	200 meters	Semifinal men
Wednesday, June 11	Track events	6:56 p.m.	400 meters	Decathlon
Wednesday, June 11	Track events	7:08 p.m.	10,000 meters	Final men
Wednesday, June 11	Track events	7:48 p.m.	4×400 relay	Semifinal men
Wednesday, June 11	Field events	12:30 p.m.	Hammer throw	Final men
Wednesday, June 11	Field events	3:40 p.m.	Javelin throw	Final men
Wednesday, June 11	Field events	4:30 p.m.	Pole vault	Final men
Wednesday, June 11	Field events	6:00 p.m.	Long jump	Final men
Wednesday, June 11	Field events	6:10 p.m.	Shot put	Final men
Wednesday, June 11	Men decathlon	12:30 p.m.	100 meters	Decathlon men
Wednesday, June 11	Men decathlon	1:10 p.m.	Long jump	Decathlon men
Wednesday, June 11	Men decathlon	2:25 p.m.	Shot put	Decathlon men
Wednesday, June 11	Men decathlon	3:40 p.m.	High jump	Decathlon men
Wednesday, June 11	Men decathlon	6:56 p.m.	400 meters	Decathlon men
Thursday, June 12	Track events	5:32 p.m.	4×100 relay	Semifinal women
Thursday, June 12	Track events	5:46 p.m.	1500 meters	Semifinal women
Thursday, June 12	Track events	6:02 p.m.	3000 steeplechase	Semifinal women
Thursday, June 12	Track events	6:32 p.m.	100 meter hurdles	Semifinal women
Thursday, June 12	Track events	6:46 p.m.	100 meters	Semifinal women
Thursday, June 12	Track events	7:00 p.m.	400 meters	Semifinal women
Thursday, June 12	Track events	7:14 p.m.	800 meters	Semifinal women
Thursday, June 12	Track events	7:30 p.m.	400 meter hurdles	Semifinal women
Thursday, June 12	Track events	7:44 p.m.	200 meters	Semifinal women
Thursday, June 12	Track events	7:56 p.m.	1500 meters	Decathlon
Thursday, June 12	Track events	8:08 p.m.	10,000 meters	Final women
Thursday, June 12	Track events	8:48 p.m.	4×400 relay	Semifinal women
Thursday, June 12	Field events	3:00 p.m.	Hammer throw	Final women
Thursday, June 12	Field events	5:10 p.m.	Javelin throw	Final women
Thursday, June 12	Field events	5:30 p.m.	Pole vault	Final women
Thursday, June 12	Field events	7:00 p.m.	Long jump	Final women
Thursday, June 12	Field events	7:10 p.m.	Shot put	Final women
Thursday, June 12	Men decathlon	10:30 a.m.	110 hurdles	Decathlon men
Thursday, June 12	Men decathlon	11:20 a.m.	Discus	Decathlon men
Thursday, June 12	Men decathlon	12:30 p.m.	Pole vault	Decathlon men
Thursday, June 12	Men decathlon	3:00 p.m.	Javelin	Decathlon men
Thursday, June 12	Men decathlon	7:56 p.m.	1500 meters	Decathlon men
Friday, June 13	Track events	6:02 p.m.	4×100 relay	Final men
Friday, June 13	Track events	6:12 p.m.	1500 meters	Final men
Friday, June 13	Track events	6:24 p.m.	3000 Steeplechase	Final men
Friday, June 13	Track events	6:42 p.m.	110 meter hurdles	Final men
Friday, June 13	Track events	6:52 p.m.	100 meters	Final men
Friday, June 13	Track events	7:02 p.m.	400 meters	Final men
Friday, June 13	Track events	7:14 p.m.	800 meters	Final men
Friday, June 13	Track events	7:27 p.m.	400 meter hurdles	Final men
Friday, June 13	Track events	7:37 p.m.	200 meters	Final men
Friday, June 13	Track events	7:43 p.m.	200 meters	Heptathlon
Friday, June 13	Track events	7:55 p.m.	5000 meters	Final men
Friday, June 13	Track events	8:21 p.m.	4×400 relay	Final men
Friday, June 13	Field events	5:30 p.m.	High jump	Final men
Friday, June 13	Field events	5:35 p.m.	Discus	Final men
Friday, June 13	Field events	6:10 p.m.	Triple jump	Final men
Friday, June 13	Women heptathlon	12:45 p.m.	100 meters	Heptathlon women
Friday, June 13	Women heptathlon	1:45 p.m.	High jump	Heptathlon women
Friday, June 13	Women heptathlon	3:45 p.m.	Shot put	Heptathlon women
Friday, June 13	Women heptathlon	7:43 p.m.	200 meters	Heptathlon women
Saturday, June 14	Track events	6:02 p.m.	4×100 relay	Final women
Saturday, June 14	Track events	6:12 p.m.	1500 meters	Final women
Saturday, June 14	Track events	6:24 p.m.	3000 steeplechase	Final women
Saturday, June 14	Track events	6:42 p.m.	100 meter hurdles	Final women
Saturday, June 14	Track events	6:52 p.m.	100 meters	Final women
Saturday, June 14	Track events	7:02 p.m.	400 meters	Final women
Saturday, June 14	Track events	7:14 p.m.	800 meters	Final women
Saturday, June 14	Track events	7:27 p.m.	400 meter hurdles	Final women
Saturday, June 14	Track events	7:37 p.m.	200 meters	Final women
Saturday, June 14	Track events	7:43 p.m.	800 meters	Heptathlon
Saturday, June 14	Track events	7:55 p.m.	5000 meters	Final women
Saturday, June 14	Track events	8:21 p.m.	4×400 relay	Final women
Saturday, June 14	Field events	5:30 p.m.	High jump	Final women
Saturday, June 14	Field events	5:35 p.m.	Discus	Final women
Saturday, June 14	Field events	6:10 p.m.	Triple jump	Final women
Saturday, June 14	Women heptathlon	2:00 p.m.	Long jump	Heptathlon women
Saturday, June 14	Women heptathlon	3:15 p.m.	Javelin	Heptathlon women
Saturday, June 14	Women heptathlon	7:43 p.m.	800 meters	Heptathlon women

== See also ==
- NCAA Men's Division I Outdoor Track and Field Championships
- NCAA Women's Division I Outdoor Track and Field Championships
- 2025 NCAA Division I Indoor Track and Field Championships
