= Devoux Deysel =

South African javelin thrower (born 2001)

Personal information
- Born: 30 March 2001 (age 25)

Sport
- Sport: Athletics
- Event: Javelin throw

Achievements and titles
- Personal best: Javelin throw: 82.35 (2025)

Devoux Deysel (born 30 March 2001) is a South African javelin thrower. He won the 2025 NCAA Division I Outdoor Track and Field Championships.

== Career ==
In May 2021, representing Angelo State University, he won the men's javelin title with a personal best throw of 75.54m at the NCAA Division 2 Outdoor Championships held in Allendale, Michigan. He was unable to defend his title in 2022 due to injury, however. In 2023, he was named Lone Star Conference Outdoor Field Male Athlete of the Year having won the conference javelin title and the NCAA Division II title for a second time, setting an all-time division record throw with 79.14 meters.

For 2024, he transferred to the University of Miami. On his Miami Hurricanes debut in March 2024, Deysel made threw 76.58m setting a new Miami outdoor program record, beating Ed Reed's throw of 66.32m, set in 1999, by more than 10 meters.

He threw a personal best 82.35 metres to win the ACC title in Winston-Salem in May 2025. In June 2025, won the 2025 NCAA Division I Outdoor Track and Field Championships in Eugene, Oregon, with throw of 81.75 metres. In doing so, he became the first Miami men's athlete to win an individual national college title since 1996.

== Personal life ==
He is from Garsfontein in South Africa.
