= Arvesta Troupe =

American high jumper (born 2004)

Personal information
- Born: 5 June 2004 (age 22)

Sport
- Sport: Athletics
- Event: High jump

Achievements and titles
- Personal bests: High jump: 2.27m (Eugene, 2025)

Arvesta Troupe (born 5 June 2004) is an American high jumper. He won the 2025 NCAA Outdoor Championships.

== Early life ==
From Fulton, Mississippi, he attended Itawamba Agricultural High School before attending the University of Mississippi. He competed in basketball and only initially took part in track and field when he was a youngster to help with his basketball conditioning. In the high jump he cleared 1.93m without any prior training. During his senior year, Troupe became the Mississippi state champion in the high jump.

== Career ==
Troupe finished third in the high jump at the SEC Championship in May 2024.

In March 2025, he finished in third place in the high jump at the 2025 NCAA Indoor Championships in Virginia Beach with a height of 2.19 metres, competing for the Ole Miss Track and Field team.

He was runner-up in the high jump at the SEC Championships in Lexington, Kentucky in May 2025, after clearing a height of 2.26 metres. In June 2025, he won the 2025 NCAA Outdoor Championships high jump title in Eugene, Oregon with a personal best height of 2.27 metres.
