= Cincinnati Bearcats track and field =

College track and field team

- University: University of Cincinnati
- Head coach: Susan Seaton
- Conference: Big 12
- Location: Cincinnati, Ohio
- Outdoor track: Gettler Stadium
- Nickname: Bearcats
- Colors: Red and black

The Cincinnati Bearcats track and field team is the track and field program that represents University of Cincinnati. The Bearcats compete in NCAA Division I as a member of the Big 12 Conference. The team is based in Cincinnati, Ohio, at the Gettler Stadium.

The program is coached by Susan Seaton. The track and field program officially encompasses four teams because the NCAA considers men's and women's indoor track and field and outdoor track and field as separate sports.

Annette Echikunwoke was the team's first individual national champion. Echikunwoke won the weight throw at the 2017 NCAA Division I Indoor Track and Field Championships and later won a silver medal in the hammer throw at the 2024 Olympics.

== Postseason ==
As of August 2025, a total of 13 men and 10 women have achieved individual first-team All-American status for the team at the Division I men's outdoor, women's outdoor, men's indoor, or women's indoor national championships (using the modern criteria of top-8 placing regardless of athlete nationality).

First team NCAA All-Americans
Team	Championships	Name	Event	Place	Ref.
Men's	1967 Indoor	Cornellius Lindsey	High jump	4th	
Men's	1970 Outdoor	Al Lanier	Triple jump	6th	
Men's	1971 Outdoor	Al Lanier	Long jump	7th	
Men's	1972 Indoor	Al Lanier	Long jump	2nd	
Men's	1972 Indoor	Al Lanier	Triple jump	3rd	
Men's	1972 Outdoor	Al Lanier	Long jump	2nd	
Men's	1973 Indoor	Al Lanier	Long jump	2nd	
Men's	1973 Outdoor	Jim Stanley	10,000 meters	4th	
Men's	1973 Outdoor	Al Lanier	Long jump	2nd	
Men's	1973 Outdoor	Al Lanier	Triple jump	6th	
Men's	1974 Outdoor	Jim Stanley	10,000 meters	7th	
Men's	1980 Outdoor	Wayne Mason	110 meters hurdles	3rd	
Men's	1987 Outdoor	Lewis Johnson	800 meters	8th	
Men's	1994 Outdoor	Chad Bisbennet	3000 meters steeplechase	7th	
Women's	2001 Indoor	Miriam Merrill	Weight throw	8th	
Men's	2003 Outdoor	David Payne	110 meters hurdles	3rd	
Men's	2004 Outdoor	David Payne	110 meters hurdles	6th	
Men's	2004 Outdoor	Chris Wineberg	Decathlon	8th	
Women's	2012 Indoor	Kathy Klump	800 meters	4th	
Women's	2012 Indoor	Jasmine Cotten	Pentathlon	7th	
Women's	2012 Outdoor	Kathy Klump	800 meters	6th	
Men's	2013 Outdoor	Josh Dangel	Pole vault	7th	
Men's	2015 Indoor	Adrian Valles	Pole vault	6th	
Men's	2015 Outdoor	Adrian Valles	Pole vault	5th	
Women's	2015 Outdoor	Erika Hurd	High jump	7th	
Men's	2016 Indoor	Adrian Valles	Pole vault	5th	
Women's	2016 Indoor	Erika Hurd	High jump	6th	
Women's	2016 Indoor	Annette Echikunwoke	Weight throw	8th	
Women's	2016 Outdoor	Loretta Blaut	High jump	6th	
Women's	2016 Outdoor	Annette Echikunwoke	Hammer throw	8th	
Men's	2017 Indoor	Adrian Valles	Pole vault	5th	
Women's	2017 Indoor	Annette Echikunwoke	Weight throw	1st	
Men's	2017 Outdoor	Adrian Valles	Pole vault	2nd	
Women's	2017 Outdoor	Loretta Blaut	High jump	6th	
Men's	2018 Indoor	Adrian Valles	Pole vault	5th	
Women's	2018 Indoor	Loretta Blaut	High jump	2nd	
Women's	2018 Indoor	Annette Echikunwoke	Weight throw	2nd	
Women's	2018 Outdoor	Loretta Blaut	High jump	2nd	
Women's	2019 Indoor	Loretta Blaut	High jump	3rd	
Men's	2021 Indoor	Aaron Bienenfeld	5000 meters	5th	
Women's	2022 Indoor	Ellie Leather	Mile run	3rd	
Men's	2023 Indoor	Fred Moudani-Likibi	Shot put	6th	
Men's	2023 Outdoor	Fred Moudani-Likibi	Shot put	3rd	
Women's	2023 Outdoor	Taylor Beard	High jump	8th	
Men's	2025 Indoor	Fred Moudani-Likibi	Shot put	6th	
Men's	2025 Indoor	Justin Abrams	Heptathlon	8th	
Men's	2025 Outdoor	Fred Moudani-Likibi	Shot put	8th	
Women's	2025 Outdoor	Macaela Walker	400 meters	5th	
Women's	2025 Outdoor	Amanda Ngandu-Ntumba	Discus throw	5th	

== See also ==
- Category:Cincinnati Bearcats men's track and field athletes (6)
- Category:Cincinnati Bearcats women's track and field athletes (4)
