= Cincinnati Bearcats =

Intercollegiate sports teams of the University of Cincinnati

- University: University of Cincinnati
- Nickname: Bearcats
- NCAA: Division I (FBS)
- Conference: Big 12 Conference
- Athletic director: John Cunningham
- Location: Cincinnati, Ohio
- Varsity teams: 18
- Football stadium: Nippert Stadium
- Basketball arena: Fifth Third Arena
- Baseball stadium: UC Baseball Stadium
- Other venues: Armory Fieldhouse, Heritage Bank Center
- Colors: Red and black
- Mascot: The Bearcat
- Fight song: "Cheer Cincinnati"
- Website: gobearcats.com

The Cincinnati Bearcats are the athletic teams that represent the University of Cincinnati. The teams compete in the NCAA's Division I and the Football Bowl Subdivision as members of the Big 12 Conference. The Bearcats were previously members of the Big East (2005-2013) and the American Athletic Conference (2013-2022). Prior to that, they were in Conference USA, of which they were a founding member. The creation of Conference USA in 1995 was the result of a merger between the Great Midwest Conference (of which Cincinnati was a member) and the Metro Conference (whom Cincinnati had previously been a member). Other collegiate athletic conferences of which the school has been a member include the Missouri Valley Conference, 1957–1969; the Mid-American Conference, 1947–1952; the Buckeye Athletic Association, 1925–1935; and the Ohio Athletic Conference, 1910–1924.

== The Bearcat ==
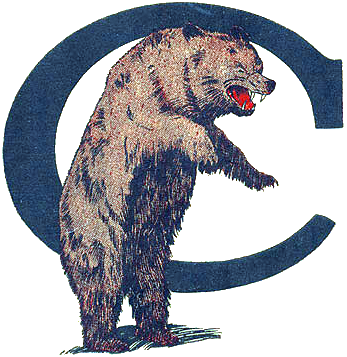
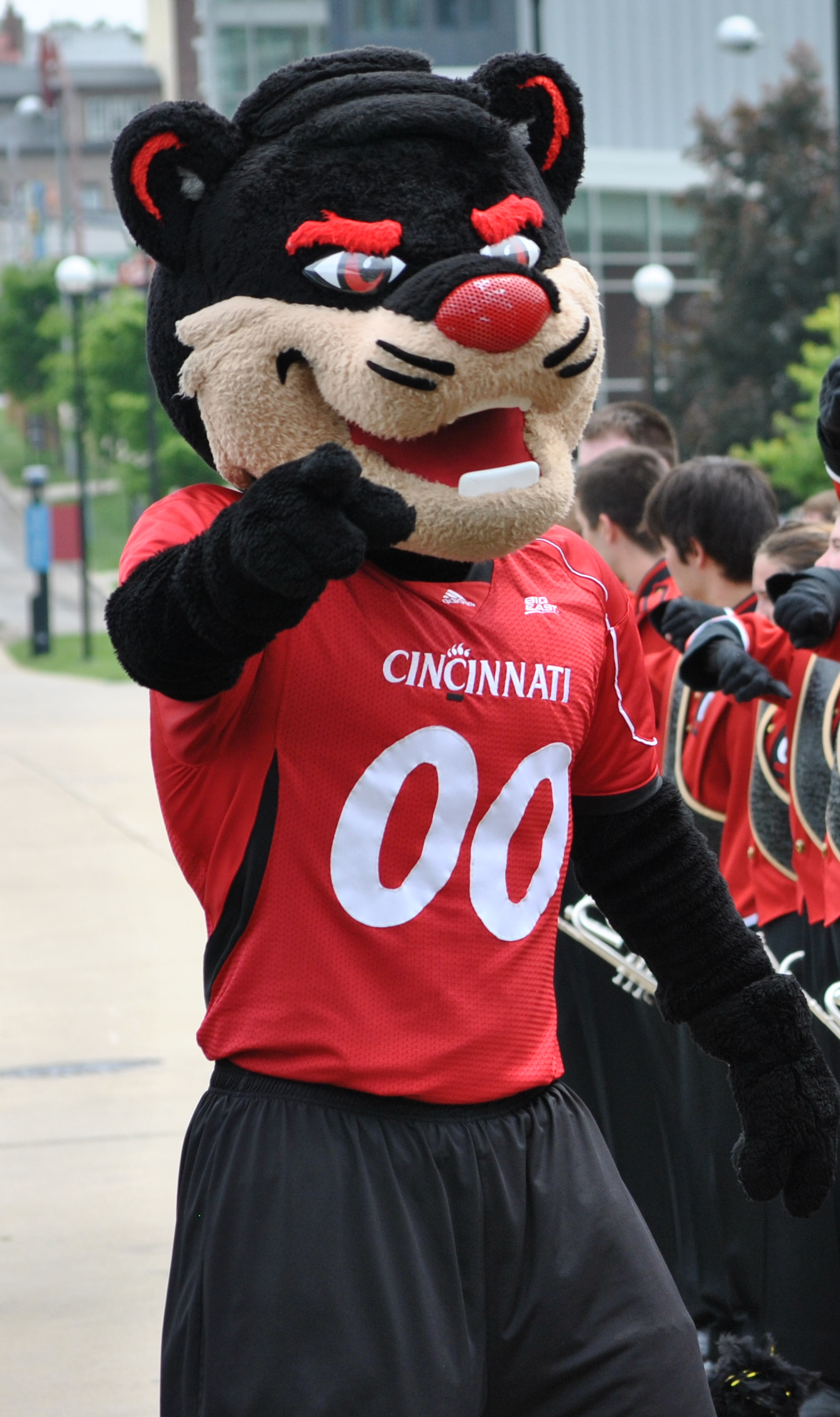
Two versions of the Bearcat, (left): a 1922 illustration, (right): the mascot in 2011

The origins of the Bearcat begin on October 31, 1914, during a football game between Cincinnati and the University of Kentucky Wildcats. During the second half of the football game, UC cheerleader Norman "Pat" Lyon created the chant: "They may be Wildcats, but we have a Baehr-cat on our side," a pun on the name of fullback Leonard K. "Teddy" Baehr.

The crowd took up the cry, and Cincinnati prevailed, 14–7. The victory was memorialized in a cartoon published on the front page of the student newspaper, the weekly University News, on November 3. The cartoon, by John "Paddy" Reece, depicted a bedraggled Kentucky Wildcat being chased by a creature labeled "Cincinnati Bear Cat." The bear cat term was already popularized in contemporary media through the Stutz Bearcat car and songs from Tin Pan Alley.

Following Teddy Baehr's graduation in 1916, the name dropped out of use, at least in print, for a few years. On November 15, 1919, Cincinnati played at Tennessee. The Cincinnati Enquirer writer Jack Ryder's game article was the first time that the major media referred to UC's teams as the "Bearcats." From then on, the university's teams were regularly called Bearcats. The school would officially begin using the Bearcat as a logo in 1922, although their initial depiction bore a stronger resemblance to a grizzly bear than the binturong, the animal known as a bearcat in America.

In 2008 the Cincinnati Zoo adopted a three-month-old binturong or "bearcat". The zoo had a public naming contest where they decided on the name "Lucy." Lucy was a prominent figure at the University of Cincinnati often to be found on Sheakley Lawn before home football games. On August 30, 2019, it was announced that Lucy would be retiring from her duties as mascot; she later died in 2021.

== Varsity sports ==
Big 12 logo in Cincinnati colors

Men's sports	Women's sports
Baseball	Basketball
Basketball	Cross country
Cross country	Golf
Football	Lacrosse
Golf	Soccer
Swimming & diving	Swimming & diving
Track and field^{1}	Tennis
	Track and field^{1}
	Volleyball
^{1} – includes both indoor and outdoor.

The University of Cincinnati sponsors teams in eight men's and 10 women's NCAA-sanctioned sports, all of which compete in the Big 12 Conference. When UC joined the Big 12, the conference did not sponsor women's lacrosse, and the Bearcats played the spring 2024 season in their former full-time home of the American Athletic Conference as a single-sport member. Women's lacrosse moved to the Big 12 when the conference added the sport in 2024–25.

=== Men's basketball ===
Cincinnati's men's basketball squads have been a perennial bracket team in the NCAA tournament. A prolific era in Bearcats basketball was during the late 1950s and early 1960s, when the Bearcats posted five consecutive Final Four appearances. Unanimous three-time All American guard Oscar Robertson led the nation in scoring during the 1957–58, 1958–59, and 1959–60 seasons and posted a career average of 33.8 points per game, which ranks as the third all-time best in Division I.

Cincinnati has won two national championships in 1961 and 1962, both under coach Ed Jucker.

Cincinnati fell out of prominence during the early 1970s. After a brief resurgence in the mid-1970s, the program fell on hard times in the 1980s, but was revitalized under head coach Bob Huggins following his hiring in 1989. Under Huggins, the Bearcats compiled a 399–127 record in sixteen seasons, and posted fourteen straight NCAA tournament appearances. The most notable of the teams from the Huggins era was the 1991–1992 team, which lost to the Michigan Wolverines in the Final Four. In addition, Huggins was responsible for recruiting several future NBA players including Kenyon Martin, Corie Blount, Ruben Patterson, Nick Van Exel and DerMarr Johnson. Huggins would eventually resign in 2005 after a power struggle with UC president Nancy Zimpher following the coach's DUI and arrest, with the resulting coaching vacuum leading to a dip in fortunes for the Bearcats. However, Zimpher's hiring of alumnus Mick Cronin in 2006 would restore UC to national prominence, reaching the NCAA Tournament nine straight years until Cronin left to coach at UCLA.

Postseason tournaments

NCAA tournament				Final ranking	
Year	Seed	Finish	Coach	AP	ESPN/UPI
1958	–	Second round	George Smith	No. 2	No. 2
1959	–	Third place	George Smith	No. 5	No. 4
1960	–	Third place	George Smith	No. 1	No. 2
1961	–	Champions	Ed Jucker	No. 2	No. 2
1962	–	Champions	Ed Jucker	No. 2	No. 2
1963	–	Second place	Ed Jucker	No. 1	No. 1
1966	–	Sweet Sixteen	Tay Baker	No. 7	No. 9
1975	–	Sweet Sixteen	Gale Catlett	#13	
1976	–	First round	Gale Catlett	No. 12	No. 16
1977	–	First round	Gale Catlett		No. 12
1992	4	Final Four	Bob Huggins	No. 12	No. 5
1993	2	Elite Eight	Bob Huggins	No. 7	No. 6
1994	8	First round	Bob Huggins	No. 25	
1995	7	Second round	Bob Huggins	–	
1996	2	Elite Eight	Bob Huggins	No. 7	No. 6
1997	3	Second round	Bob Huggins	No. 10	No. 16
1998	2	Second round	Bob Huggins	No. 9	No. 14

NCAA tournament				Final ranking	
Year	Seed	Finish	Coach	AP	ESPN/UPI
1999	3	Second round	Bob Huggins	No. 11	No. 11
2000	2	Second round	Bob Huggins	No. 7	No. 7
2001	5	Sweet Sixteen	Bob Huggins		No. 22
2002	1	Second round	Bob Huggins	No. 5	No. 8
2003	8	First round	Bob Huggins		
2004	4	Second round	Bob Huggins	No. 11	No. 18
2005	7	Second round	Bob Huggins	No. 23	No. 25
2011	6	Third round	Mick Cronin		
2012	6	Sweet Sixteen	Mick Cronin		No. 18
2013	10	Second round	Mick Cronin		
2014	5	Second round	Mick Cronin	No. 15	No. 14
2015	8	Third round	Mick Cronin		
2016	9	Second round	Mick Cronin		
2017	6	Third round	Mick Cronin	No. 18	No. 16
2018	2	Third round	Mick Cronin	No. 6	No. 12
2019	6	Second round	Mick Cronin	No. 22	No. 24

=== Men's soccer ===
The men's soccer program was discontinued effectively immediately on April 14, 2020.

== Club sports ==
The university has a diverse number of intercollegiate club sports teams. Notable teams include alpine skiing (which competes in the United States Collegiate Ski and Snowboard Association), men's baseball, rowing, lacrosse, men's soccer, and the men's ice hockey team (which competes in the American Collegiate Hockey Association DI). The Tennis Club competes in the USTA Tennis on Campus and the Great Lakes Tennis Conference. The Waterski Team were 2008 DII National Champions. The University of Cincinnati Rugby Football Club was established in 1971 and competes in Division 1 college rugby in the MAC conference. The University of Cincinnati Women's Rugby Football Club was founded in 2012 and competes in Division 2 in the Ohio Valley Conference. In 2014 and 2015 UCWRFC competed in the Women's College Division 2 Fall Championship; advancing to the round of 8 in 2015. The UC Disc golf team have won the team national championship in 2023 and 2025, along with players earning individual championships in 2017 and 2023.

Club sports at Cincinnati operate in a tier system. The top tier are the Tier 5 sports, which are classified as semi-varsity. These clubs operate at a level similar to a varsity team in sports for which Cincinnati lacks varsity representation, and the tier reflects the commitment these students dedicate to their club. The four Tier 5 semi-varsity sports as of 2013 are equestrian, men's ice hockey, men's and women's rowing, and men's and women's waterski.

In 2024, Cincinnati started an Australian rules football club team at the university, the first current collegiate Aussie Rules team in North America. In 2025, the team ended the season as the #1 ranked college team in the nation, making them the 2025 national champions for collegiate Aussie Rules.

== Championships ==
=== NCAA team championships ===
Cincinnati has won 2 NCAA team national championships, the Men's Basketball in 1961 and 1962

=== Other national team championships ===
Below are 8 national team titles that were not bestowed by the NCAA:

- Men’s
  - Australian rules football (1): 2025
- Women's
  - Dance (5): 2004, 2005, 2006, 2009, 2015
- Mixed
  - Disc golf (2): 2023, 2025

The Bearcats won the NCAA Men's Division I Basketball Championship in 1961 and 1962, both times against Ohio State. The UC Dance Team has won 5 National Championships from 2004 through 2006, 2009 and again in 2015. They are the first team in UC history to ever capture three consecutive national titles. They remain one of the top dance programs in the country and are the winningest team in University of Cincinnati history. In 2009 the dance team was also selected to represent the United States of America in the first ever world dance championships where they won the gold medal in all three dance categories. The dance team was asked back to the world competition in 2015.

=== National individual championships ===
Charles Keating won the 1946 200m butterfly national title for UC as a member of the men's swimming team and most recently, Josh Schneider did the same in the 50-yard (46 m) freestyle in 2010. In men's diving, Pat Evans (3 m Dive – 1989) and women's diving Becky Ruehl (10 m dive – 1996) have brought home titles for the Bearcats. Annette Echikunwoke won the NCAA National title in the women's weight throw in 2017.

== Rivalries ==
=== Miami (OH) ===
Cincinnati's oldest football rivalry, begun in 1888, is with Miami University, located in Oxford, Ohio about 40 miles to the northwest. The Victory Bell awarded to the winner of each contest, with Cincinnati holding it after their win in 2024.

The teams take each other on annual in many other sports. After a decade hiatus from 2011-2020, the Men's basketball teams faced each other in both 2022 and 2023, with the Bearcats winning both matchups.

=== West Virginia ===
The teams met 20 times between 1921 and 2011, every year from 2005 to 2011, as conference foes and members of the Big East Conference. The schools have competed as Big 12 Conference opponents since 2023, after Cincinnati's invite into the conference. West Virginia leads Cincinnati in the series 17-3-1 since 2011.

=== Louisville ===
Cincinnati and the University of Louisville battled annually for the Keg of Nails. This rivalry dated back to 1929, but ended when Louisville joined the Atlantic Coast Conference in 2014.

The men's basketball teams of both schools have also participated in a fierce rivalry historically, with Louisville leading the all time series 53–44.

The schools continue to play in other sports, primarily an annual game in baseball.

=== Memphis ===
The rivalry between these two schools dates to their first men's college football game in 1966, and has continued across all sports, with the basketball series gaining attention as well, having started in 1968.

Interest in the series was renewed with both teams reuniting in the American Athletic Conference and Memphis's basketball reemergence. Football has also intensified, with both teams playing in the 2019 American Athletic Conference Football Championship Game. The series is expected to go into hiatus upon Cincinnati's move to the Big 12 conference in July 2023.

=== Xavier ===
In basketball, the Bearcats' crosstown rival is the Xavier University Musketeers. Xavier is located less than 3 miles from the University of Cincinnati's main campus. The Bearcats and the Musketeers meet annually in the popular Crosstown Shootout.

Cincinnati and Xavier used to have a fierce rivalry in football, before Xavier eliminated their program after the 1973 season. The schools routinely battle each other in other sports annually as well.

=== Others ===
When Cincinnati joined the Big East in 2005, they and the University of Pittsburgh started the River City Rivalry. The game is a battle for the River City Rivalry trophy. In 2013 the rivalry series went on a ten year hiatus due to Pittsburgh's exit from the Big East to the Atlantic Coast Conference. The Bearcats and Panthers renewed their series in 2023 with the Bearcats winning in Pittsburgh by a 27-21 score.

Cincinnati and the Dayton Flyers were another regional rivalry that has lost significance recently. The teams would play periodically in football, before Dayton went down to NCAA Division III in 1977. The teams also frequently played in men's basketball, though the series has ceased since 2011.

Cincinnati also has had intermittent rivalries with the Ohio State Buckeyes, Ohio Bobcats, and the Kentucky Wildcats. Although Cincinnati does not play these schools regularly, these are geographic rivals and are all universities of similar size and stature. In 1961 and 1962 Cincinnati defeated Ohio State in both of its back-to-back national title games in basketball.

== Athletic facilities ==
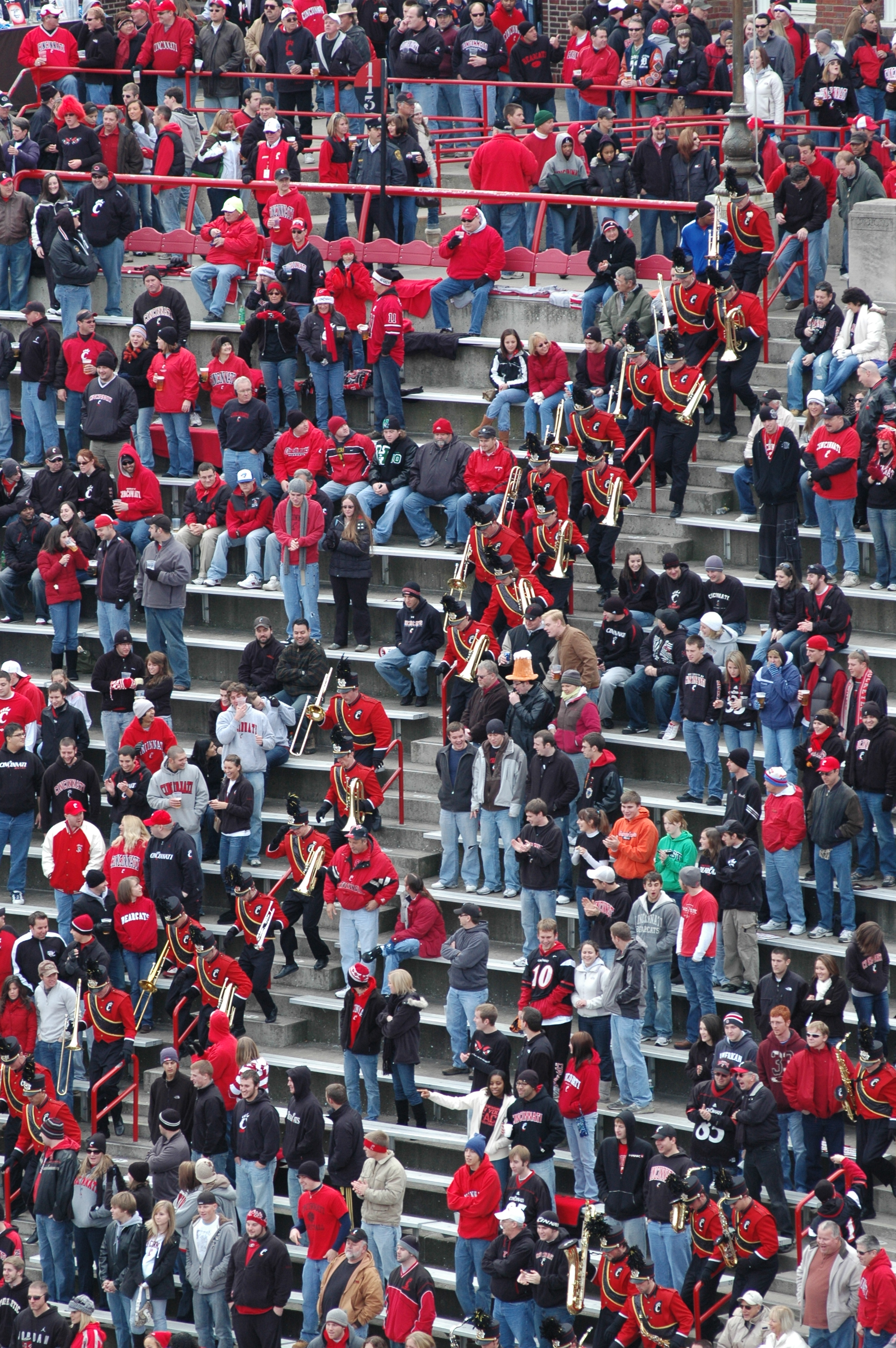
The UC Bearcat Band charges down Nippert Stadium's steps.

All of the athletic facilities (with the exception of Fifth Third Arena and UC Baseball Stadium) are open 24/7 for student use.

- Richard E. Lindner Varsity Village
  - Commissioned as part of UC's entrance into the Big East and serves as the centerpiece of UC's athletic facilities. It opened in 2006 and includes the Richard E. Linder Center, which provides training, meeting, studying, and classroom space, as well as the George and Helen Smith Athletics Museum. Also located here is the Sheakley Lawn, which is reserved for students and club sports.
- UC Baseball Stadium
  - Home to the UC Baseball team. It replaced Johnny Bench Field. Shortly after this facility opened in 2006, it was named by Big East coaches and players as the best baseball facility in the conference.
- Armory Fieldhouse

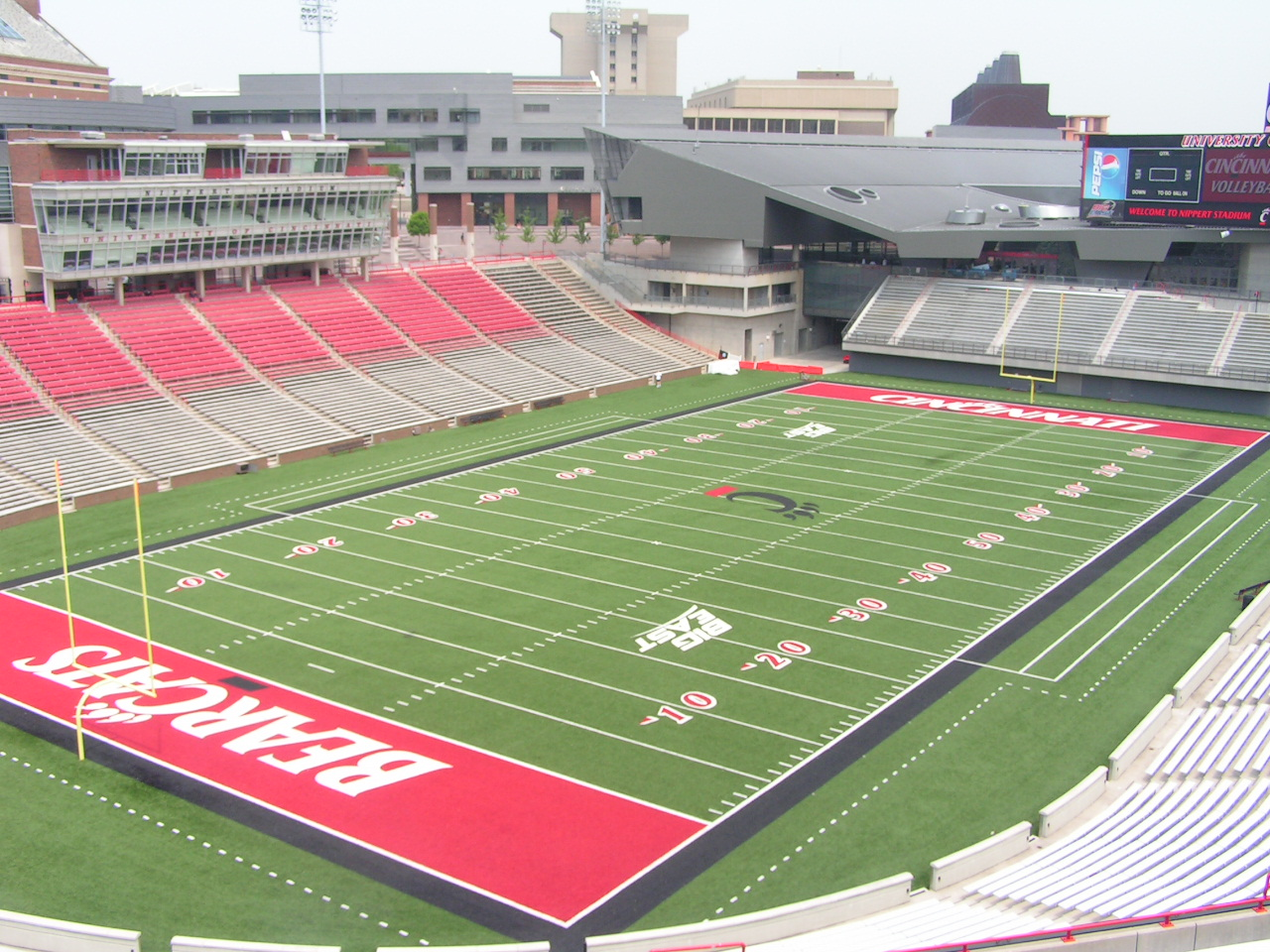
Nippert Stadium

- Fifth Third Arena
  - Home to UC men's and women's basketball and women's volleyball teams.
- Nippert Stadium
  - Home to UC's football and women's lacrosse teams.
- Gettler Stadium
  - Home to UC Women's Soccer and Track and Field teams
- Trabert-Talbert Tennis Center
  - Home to UC Women's Tennis teams; opened in May 2006, it features six courts in three different sections with lighting and grandstand seating for 500.
- Keating Aquatic Center
  - Home to UC Men's and Women's Swimming and Diving teams
- Indoor Practice Facility & Performance Center
  - A permanent home for UC football, the Indoor Practice Facility & Performance Center is being built on the site of Sheakley Field. The Indoor Practice Facility will feature a 120-yard football field equipped for multiple sports. The field will provide an all-weather home for Cincinnati football practices and year-round workouts and have direct access to the Performance Center’s weight room, training room and performance nutrition fueling stations. The 96,000 square-foot Performance Center features three levels that will provide nearly everything a student-athlete needs to get competition and practice ready in one place. Construction started in April 2023, goal for completion is Spring 2025.

== Radio and television ==
Since 1992, 700 WLW has been the radio home for Bearcats athletics. Dan Hoard has been the football and basketball play-by-play since 2000. Former Bearcat Terry Nelson began full time duties at the beginning of the 2017-18 season as analyst for basketball replacing Chuck Machock. During the 2015-16 Basketball season, Machock decided to reduce his travel schedule and not attend every road game as in previous years; due to a leg injury, Since the 2023-24 season former Bearcat Steve Logan handles radio color commentary when Nelson is on TV.

Jim Kelly, a Bearcat wide receiver during the mid 1970s, provides analysis for football. Mo Egger an afternoon radio host on Cincinnati's ESPN 1530 is the football pregame and postgame show host. in 2015 Former Bearcat QB Tony Pike was named the new sideline reporter replacing Tom Gelehrter, When there is a conflict with the Reds 102.7 WEBN will usually air games, when a conflict with the Bengals 55KRC airs basketball games. Egger is the backup play-by-play man.

== Notable alumni ==
=== Baseball ===
Hall of Famer Sandy Koufax

- Sandy Koufax, Baseball Hall of Famer, 7× MLB All-Star, NL MVP, 3× Cy Young Award
- Miller Huggins, Baseball Hall of Fame manager
- Kevin Youkilis, former MLB first and third baseman, 3x MLB All Star, Hank Aaron Award
- Ethan Allen, former MLB outfielder
- Tony Campana, former MLB outfielder
- Nate Fish, former director of the Israel Association of Baseball and coach for Israel at the World Baseball Classic
- Ian Happ, Chicago Cubs outfielder
- Josh Harrison, Cincinnati Reds infielder
- Joey Wiemer, Washington Nationals outfielder

=== Basketball ===
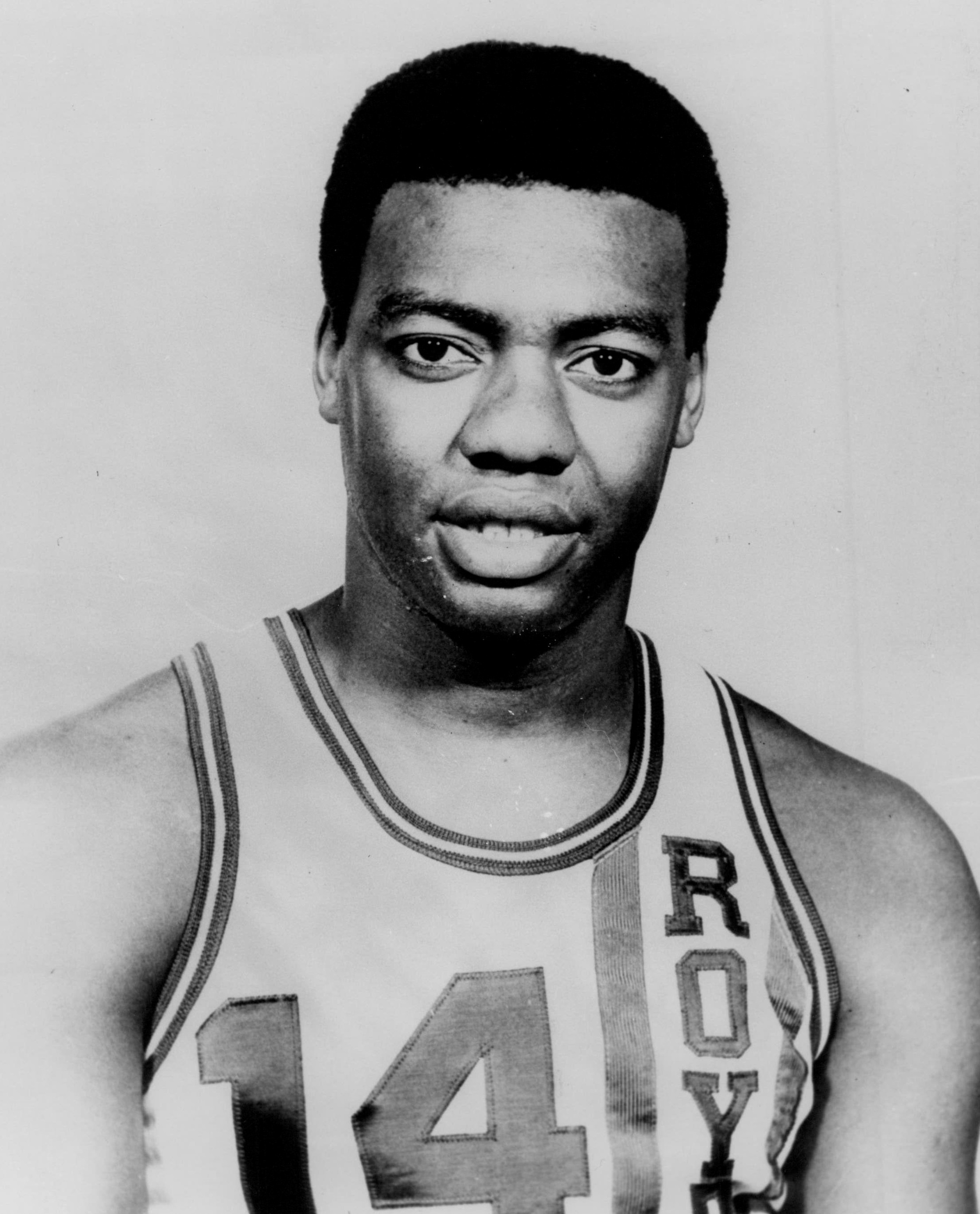
Hall of Famer Oscar Robertson

- Oscar Robertson, Basketball Hall of Famer
- Jack Twyman, Basketball Hall of Famer
- Kenny Satterfield, Former NBA Point Guard
- Nick Van Exel, Former NBA Point Guard, Memphis Grizzlies Assistant Coach
- Steve Logan, Former NBA Shooting Guard
- Corie Blount, Former NBA Power forward/center
- Kenyon Martin, Former NBA Power Forward
- Jason Maxiell, Former NBA Power Forward
- Sean Kilpatrick, Chicago Bulls Shooting Guard
- James White, KK Cedevita Shooting Guard/Small Forward
- Lance Stephenson, Los Angeles Lakers Shooting Guard
- Danny Fortson, Former NBA Power forward/center
- Ruben Patterson, Former NBA Small Forward/Shooting Guard
- Melvin Levett, Former NBA Shooting Guard
- Yancy Gates, Telekom Baskets Bonn Power Forward
- Pete Mickeal, Former Small Forward
- Eric Hicks, Former Power Forward

=== Football ===
- Urban Meyer, former college head coach, most recently at Ohio State
- Ray Nolting, Chicago Bears Halfback University of Cincinnati Head Football Coach
- Connor Barwin, Philadelphia Eagles Linebacker
- Trent Cole, Indianapolis Colts Defensive End
- Greg Cook, Former Cincinnati Bengals Quarterback and 1969 AFL Rookie of the Year
- Zach Collaros, CFL Quarterback
- Brent Celek, Philadelphia Eagles Tight End
- Sauce Gardner, New York Jets cornerback
- Mardy Gilyard, CFL Wide Receiver
- Armon Binns, Ottawa Redblacks Wide Receiver
- Tyjuan Hagler, Former NFL Linebacker
- Jason Kelce, Philadelphia Eagles Center
- Travis Kelce, Kansas City Chiefs Tight End
- Daven Holly, Former Cleveland Browns Cornerback
- Kevin Huber, Former Cincinnati Bengals Punter
- Haruki Nakamura, Former Baltimore Ravens Safety
- Tony Pike, Former Carolina Panthers Quarterback
- Desmond Ridder, Atlanta Falcons quarterback
- Brandon Underwood, Toronto Argonauts Safety
- Antonio Chatman, Former NFL and XFL Wide Receiver
- Tinker Keck, Former XFL Defensive Back
- Troy Evans, Former New Orleans Saints Linebacker
- Isaiah Pead, former Miami Dolphins Running Back
- Vaughn Booker, Retired Cincinnati Bengals Defensive Line
- Derek Wolfe, Denver Broncos Defensive End
- Andre Frazier, Retired Pittsburgh Steelers Cincinnati Bengals Linebacker 2 Time World Champion

=== Tennis ===
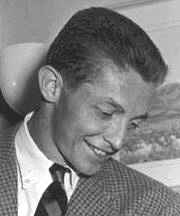
Tony Trabert

- Tony Trabert, Tennis Hall of Famer
- Bill Talbert, Tennis Hall of Famer

=== Other ===
- Tim Brown, Co-Founder of Allbirds, Wellington Phoenix and New Zealand Midfielder
- Omar Cummings, FC Cincinnati and Jamaica Forward
- Annette Echikunwoke, 2024 Olympic Silver Medalist hammer thrower
- Rich Franklin, former UFC Middleweight Champion, currently fighting in the UFC Light Heavyweight Division
- Mary Wineberg, 2008 Olympic Gold Medalist track and field athlete
- David Payne, 2008 Olympic Silver Medalist hurdler
- Jim Herman, Golfer
- Vanessa Gilles, Defender on the Canada women's national soccer team, Division 1 Féminine Club Olympique Lyonnais Féminin (on loan from NWSL club Angel City FC as of October 2023), and Olympic Gold Medalist (Summer 2020).
- Jordan Thompson, Professional volleyball player, member of the USA National Team and 2020 Summer Olympic Gold Medalist.
