= 4 × 100 meter relay at the NCAA Division I Outdoor Track and Field Championships =

This is a list of the NCAA outdoor champions in the 4 × 110 yard relay until 1975, and the metric 4 × 100 metres relay since metrication occurred in 1976. Hand timing was used until 1973, while starting in 1974 fully automatic timing was used.

== Winners ==
Key
y=yards
A=Altitude assisted

Women's winners
Year	Team	Athletes	Time
1982	Nebraska Cornhuskers	Deborah James; Alicia McQueen; Rhonda Blanford; Merlene Ottey (JAM)	43.72
1983	Florida State Seminoles	Angie Wright; Marita Payne (CAN); Brenda Cliette; Randy Givens	42.94
1984	Florida State Seminoles	Michelle Finn-Burrell; Marita Payne (CAN); Brenda Cliette; Randy Givens	43.72
1985	LSU Lady Tigers	Sheila Echols; Michelle King; Angie Phipps (CAN); Michele Morris	43.82
1986	Texas Southern Tigers	Moswumola Soneye (NGR); Linda Eseimokumoh (NGR); Mary Onyali (NGR); Maria Usifo (NGR)	43.71
1987	Florida State Seminoles	Janet Levy; Janet Davis; Andrea Thompson; Michelle Finn-Burrell	43.19
1988	Arizona State Sun Devils	Lynda Tolbert; Tamika Foster; Maicel Malone; Jacinta Bartholomew (GRN)	43.64
1989	LSU Lady Tigers	Tananjalyn Stanley; Dawn Sowell; Cinnamon Sheffield; Esther Jones	42.50
1990	LSU Lady Tigers	Tananjalyn Stanley; Dawn Bowles; Cinnamon Sheffield; Esther Jones	43.99
1991	Texas Longhorns	Stacey Clack; Tamela Saldana; Michelle Williams; Carlette Guidry	42.88
1992	LSU Lady Tigers	Dawn Bowles; Cheryl Taplin; Cinnamon Sheffield; Dahlia Duhaney (JAM)	43.03
1993	LSU Lady Tigers	Debbie Ann Parris (JAM); Heather Van Norman; Youlanda Warren; Cheryl Taplin	43.49
1994	LSU Lady Tigers	Debbie Ann Parris (JAM); D'Andre Hill; Zundra Feagin; Cheryl Taplin	43.26
1995	LSU Lady Tigers	Marita Hunt; Kwajalein Butler; Zundra Feagin; D'Andre Hill	43.10
1996	LSU Lady Tigers	Astia Walker (JAM); Kwajalein Butler; Zundra Feagin; D'Andre Hill	43.03
1997	LSU Lady Tigers	Astia Walker (JAM); Kwajalein Butler; Sa'Donna Thornton; Peta-Gaye Dowdie (JAM)	43.17
1998	Texas Longhorns	Kim McGruder; Nanceen Perry; Angie Vaughn; LaKeisha Backus	42.76
1999	Texas Longhorns	Kim McGruder; Nanceen Perry; LaKeesha White; LaKeisha Backus	42.95
2000	USC Trojans	Angela Williams; Candace Young; Malika Edmonson; Kinshasa Davis	43.14
2001	LSU Lady Tigers	Sa'Donna Thornton; Stephanie Durst; Myra Combs; Muna Lee	43.54
2002	South Carolina Gamecocks	Erica Whipple; Demetria Washington; Lisa Barber; Aleen Bailey (JAM)	43.12
2003	LSU Lady Tigers	Stephanie Durst; Monique Hall; Lolo Jones; Muna Lee	42.55
2004	LSU Lady Tigers	Lolo Jones; Monique Hall; Stephanie Durst; Muna Lee	42.61
2005	Texas Longhorns	Ashlee Williams; Melaine Walker (JAM); Jerika Chapple; Marshevet Hooker	42.87
2006	Texas Longhorns	Jasmine Lee; Alex Anderson; LaTashia Kerr; Melaine Walker (JAM)	42.84
2007	Texas A&M Aggies	Elizabeth Adeoti; Porscha Lucas; Simone Facey (JAM); Tresha Henry	43.05
2008	Texas A&M Aggies	Elizabeth Adeoti; Porscha Lucas; Simone Facey (JAM); Allison George (GRN)	42.59
2009	Texas A&M Aggies	Khrystal Carter; Porscha Lucas; Dominique Duncan; Gabby Mayo	42.36
2010	Texas A&M Aggies	Jeneba Tarmoh; Porscha Lucas; Dominique Duncan; Elizabeth Adeoti	42.82
2011	LSU Lady Tigers	Kenyanna Wilson; Semoy Hackett (TTO); Rebecca Alexander; Kimberlyn Duncan	42.64
2012	Texas A&M Aggies (Note: Originally won by the LSU Lady Tigers team of Takeia Pinckney, Semoy Hackett, Rebecca Alexander, and Kimberlyn Duncan in a time of 42.75, but the title was later vacated due to a doping positive by Hackett.)	LaKeidra Stewart; Olivia Ekponé; Dominique Duncan; Ashley Collier	42.75
2013	Texas A&M Aggies	LaKeidra Stewart; Ashton Purvis; Kamaria Brown; Ashley Collier	42.88
2014	Texas A&M Aggies	Jennifer Madu; Ashton Purvis; Kamaria Brown; Olivia Ekponé	42.80
2015	Florida Gators	Robin Reynolds; Shayla Sanders; Destinee Gause; Kyra Jefferson	42.95
2016	LSU Lady Tigers	Mikiah Brisco; Kortnei Johnson; Jada Martin; Rushell Harvey	42.65
2017	Kentucky Wildcats	Destiny Carter; Jasmine Camacho-Quinn (PUR); Kayelle Clarke (TTO); Kianna Gray	42.51
2018	LSU Lady Tigers	Mikiah Brisco; Kortnei Johnson; Rachel Misher; Aleia Hobbs	42.25
2019	USC Trojans	Chanel Brissett; Angie Annelus; Lanae Thomas; TeeTee Terry	42.21
2021	USC Trojans	Jasmine Jones; Angie Annelus; Lanae Thomas; TeeTee Terry	42.82
2022	Texas Longhorns	Julien Alfred (LCA); Rhasidat Adeleke (IRL); Kevona Davis (JAM); Kynnedy Flannel	42.42
2023	Texas Longhorns	Julien Alfred (LCA); Ezinne Abba; Rhasidat Adeleke (IRL); Kevona Davis (JAM)	41.55 MR
2024	Ole Miss Rebels	Akilah Lewis (TTO); McKenzie Long; Gabrielle Matthews (JAM); Jahniya Bowers	42.34
2025	USC Trojans	Samirah Moody; Dajaz DeFrand; Madison Whyte; Jassani Carter	42.22
2026	USC Trojans	Dajaz DeFrand; Mia Brahe-Pedersen; Madison Whyte; Brianna Selby	41.58

Men's winners
Year	Team	Athletes	Time
1964	Illinois Fighting Illini	Gilwyn Williams; Mel Blanheim; Mike Yavorski; Trenton Jackson	40.1y
1965	San Jose State Spartans	Wayne Hermen; Lloyd Murad (VEN); Maurice Compton; Tommie Smith	40.5y
1966	UCLA Bruins	Tom Jones; Bob Frey; Ron Copeland; Norm Jackson	39.9y
1967	USC Trojans	Earl McCullouch; Fred Kuller; O. J. Simpson; Lennox Miller (JAM)	38.6Ay WR
1968	USC Trojans	Earl McCullouch; Fred Kuller; O. J. Simpson; Lennox Miller (JAM)	39.5y
1969	San Jose State Spartans	Sam Davis; Kirk Clayton; Ronnie Ray Smith; John Carlos	39.1y
1970	USC Trojans (Note: Originally won by the California Golden Bears team of Don Couser, Isaac Curtis, Dave Masters, and Eddie Hart in a time of 40.3, but Curtis was later declared ineligible and the title was vacated.)	Mike Jackson; Monty Turner; Ken Jones; Edesel Garrison	40.6y
1971	USC Trojans	Lance Babb; Edesel Garrison; Leon Brown; Willie Deckard	39.5y
1972	USC Trojans	Randy Williams; Leon Brown; Edesel Garrison; Willie Deckard	39.6y
1973	Memphis State Tigers	Maurice Knight; Lynn Fox; Ed Hammonds; Ed Taylor	39.6y
1974	Kansas Jayhawks	Tom Scavuzzo; Eddie Lewis; Mark Lutz; Emmett Edwards	39.54y
1975	USC Trojans	Randy Williams; Michael Simmons; Ken Randle; James Gilkes (GUY)	39.09Ay
1976	Tennessee Volunteers	Jon Young; Ricci Gardner; Jerome Morgan; Reggie Jones	39.16
1977	USC Trojans	Thomas Andrew; Michael Simmons; Joel Andrews; Clancy Edwards	39.56
1978	Auburn Tigers (Note: Originally won by the USC Trojans team of Kevin Williams, Billy Mullins, Clancy Edwards, and James Sanford in a time of 39.31, but Mullins was later declared "scholastically ineligible" and the title was stripped.)	Tony Easley; James Walker; Willie Smith; Harvey Glance	39.49
1979	USC Trojans	Kevin Williams; Colin Bradford (JAM); James Sanford; Billy Mullins	39.35
1980	USC Trojans	Kevin Williams; Mike Sanford; James Sanford; William Green	39.26
1981	Northwestern State Demons	Victor Oatis; Joe Delaney; Mario Johnson; Mark Duper	39.32
1982	Houston Cougars	Charles Young; Mark McNeil; Anthony Ketchum; Stanley Floyd	38.53A
1983	Tennessee Volunteers	Sam Graddy; Reggie Towns; Terry Scott; Willie Gault	39.22
1984	Georgia Bulldogs	Neal Jessie; Sam Palmer; Stanley Blalock; Lester Benjamin (ANT)	39.39
1985	NC State Wolfpack	Auguston Young; Alston Glenn; Danny Peebles; Harvey McSwain	39.12
1986	TCU Horned Frogs	Roscoe Tatum; Andrew Smith (JAM); Leroy Reid; Greg Sholars	38.46
1987	TCU Horned Frogs	Roscoe Tatum; Andrew Smith (JAM); Greg Sholars; Raymond Stewart (JAM)	38.82
1988	Texas A&M Aggies	Lawrence Felton; Derrick Florence; Andre Cason; Stanley Kerr	38.84
1989	TCU Horned Frogs	Horatio Porter; Andrew Smith (JAM); Greg Sholars; Raymond Stewart (JAM)	38.23A
1990	Alabama Crimson Tide	Richard Beattie; Eduardo Nava (MEX); Bradley McCuaig (CAN); Clive Wright (JAM)	38.87
1991	TCU Horned Frogs	Jon Drummond; Carey Johnson; Ralston Wright; Horatio Porter	38.88
1992	LSU Tigers	Reggie Jones; Bryant Williams; Chris King; Jason Sanders	38.7
1993	LSU Tigers	Reggie Jones; Glenroy Gilbert (CAN); Chris King; Fabian Muyaba (ZIM)	38.7
1994	LSU Tigers	Eddie Kennison; Bryant Williams; Derrick Thymes; Fabian Muyaba (ZIM)	38.91
1995	TCU Horned Frogs	Donovan Powell (JAM); Brashant Carter; Lloyd Edwards; Hosia Abdallah	38.63
1996	North Carolina Tar Heels	Marcus Stokes; Tony McCall; Milton Campbell; Curtis Johnson	39.05
1997	Texas A&M Aggies	Michael Price; Toya Jones; Billy Fobbs; Danny McCray	38.8
1998	TCU Horned Frogs (Note: TCU men's championship results from 1997 to 2004 were later invalidated by the NCAA. The 1998 runner-up team was Jermaine Grant, Mike Alridge, Byron Logan, and Curtis Perry of the LSU Tigers track and field team with a time of 38.24 seconds.)	Bryan Howard; Jarmiene Holloway; Syan Williams; Percy Spencer	38.04 CR
1999	South Carolina Gamecocks	Clint Crenshaw; Terrence Trammell; Shah Mays; Jamie Price	38.92
2000	Florida Gators	Daymon Carroll; Bernard Williams; Aaron Armstrong (TTO); Geno White	38.35
2001	TCU Horned Frogs (Note: TCU men's championship results from 1997 to 2004 were later invalidated by the NCAA. The 2001 runner-up team was Sean Lambert, Justin Gatlin, Hassan Stamps, and Leonard Scott of the LSU Tigers track and field team with a time of 38.24 seconds.)	Lindel Frater (JAM); David Spencer; Darvis Patton; Kim Collins (SKN)	38.58
2002	LSU Tigers	Walter Davis; Robert Parham; Pete Coley; Bennie Brazell	38.48
2003	LSU Tigers	Kelly Willie; Robert Parham; Pete Coley; Bennie Brazell	38.65
2004	Florida Gators	Ahmad Jasmine; Mike Morrison; Kyle Farmer; Sekou Clarke	39.11
2005	Arkansas Razorbacks	Michael Grant; Wallace Spearmon; Tyson Gay; Omar Brown (JAM)	38.49
2006	LSU Tigers	Richard Thompson (TTO); Xavier Carter; Marvin Stevenson; Kelly Willie	38.44
2007	Florida State Seminoles	Greg Bolden; Walter Dix; Michael Ray Garvin; Charles Clark	
2008	LSU Tigers	Armanti Hayes; Richard Thompson (TTO); Gabriel Mvumuvre (ZIM); Trindon Holliday	38.42
2009	Florida Gators	Dennis Martin; Calvin Smith Jr. Terrell Wilks; Jeremy Hall	38.58
2010	Florida Gators	Chris Rainey; Jeremy Hall; Terrell Wilks; Jeff Demps	39.04
2011	Florida State Seminoles	Kemar Hyman (CAY); Ngonidzashe Makusha (ZIM); Maurice Mitchell; Brandon Byram	38.77
2012	LSU Tigers	Barrett Nugent; Aaron Ernest; Keyth Talley; Shermund Allsop (TTO)	38.38
2013	Florida Gators	Antwan Wright; Hugh Graham; Leonardo Seymore; Dedric Dukes	38.53
2014	Florida Gators	Antwan Wright; Hugh Graham; Arman Hall; Dedric Dukes	38.73
2015	Arkansas Razorbacks	Omar McLeod (JAM); Jarrion Lawson; Kenzo Cotton; Marqueze Washington	38.47
2016	LSU Tigers	Jaron Flournoy; Renard Howell; Tremayne Acy; Nethaneel Mitchell-Blake (GBR)	38.42
2017	Houston Cougars	John Lewis III; Mario Burke (BAR); Jacarias Martin; Cameron Burrell	38.34
2018	Houston Cougars	John Lewis III; Elijah Hall-Thompson; Mario Burke (BAR); Cameron Burrell	38.17 MR
2019	Florida Gators	Raymond Ekevwo (NGR); Abdul Hakim Sani Brown (JPN); Grant Holloway; Ryan Clark	37.97 MR
2021	LSU Tigers	Dylan Peebles; Noah Williams; Akanni Hislop (TTO); Terrance Laird	38.48
2022	USC Trojans	Kasaun James; Brendon Stewart; Ashton Allen; Johnnie Blockburger	38.49
2023	LSU Tigers	Brandon Hicklin; Dorian Camel; Da'Marcus Fleming; Godson Oghenebrume (NGR)	38.05
2024	Auburn Tigers	Muhd Azeem Fahmi (MAS); Kayinsola Ajayi (NGR); Dario Matau (RSA); Makanakaishe Charamba (ZIM)	38.03
2025	Auburn Tigers	Muhd Azeem Fahmi (MAS); Kayinsola Ajayi (NGR); Dario Matau (RSA); Makanakaishe Charamba (ZIM)	38.33
2026	Tennessee Volunteers	Traunard Folson (USA); Davonte Howell (CYM); T'Mars McCallum (USA); Elijah Clark (USA)	37.98
