= 2025 NCAA Division I Indoor Track and Field Championships =

College track and field competition

- Dates: March 14-15, 2025
- Host city: Virginia Beach, Virginia
- Venue: Virginia Beach Sports Center
- Events: 34
- Participation: 650 selected athletes

The 2025 NCAA Division I Indoor Track and Field Championships was the 60th NCAA Division I Men's Indoor Track and Field Championships and the 43rd NCAA Division I Women's Indoor Track and Field Championships, held at Virginia Beach Sports Center in Virginia Beach, Virginia. The field consisted of 17 different men's and women's indoor track and field events with a total of 650 participants contested from March 14 to March 15, 2024.

== Streaming and TV coverage ==
ESPN streamed the event on ESPN2, and ESPNU. On March 17, a replay of the championships was broadcast at 9:00 PM Eastern Time on ESPNU.

== Results ==
=== Men's results ===
==== 60 meters ====
- Final results shown, not prelims

Placings in the men's 60 meters at the 2025 NCAA Division I Indoor Track and Field Championships
Rank	Name	University	Time	Team score
1st place, gold medalist(s)	(United States) Jordan Anthony	Arkansas	6.49	10
2nd place, silver medalist(s)	(Nigeria) Kanyinsola Ajayi	Auburn	6.52	8
3rd place, bronze medalist(s)	(Nigeria) Israel Okon	Auburn	6.52	6
4	(Ghana) Abdul-Rasheed Saminu	South Florida	6.53	5
5	(Jamaica) Travis Williams	USC	6.54	4 SB
6	(United States) JC Stevenson	USC	6.55	3
7	(United States) Malachi Snow	Texas Tech	6.59	2
8	(Nigeria) Adekalu Fakorede	Mississippi State	6.59	1

==== 200 meters ====
- Final results shown, not prelims

Placings in the men's 200 meters at the 2025 NCAA Division I Indoor Track and Field Championships
Rank	Name	University	Time	Team score
1st place, gold medalist(s)	(Zimbabwe) Carli Makarawu	Kentucky	20.13	10 FR
2nd place, silver medalist(s)	(Zimbabwe) Makanakaishe Charamba	Auburn	20.16	8
3rd place, bronze medalist(s)	(United States) Cameron Miller	Purdue	20.49	6
4	(United States) Garrett Kaalund	USC	20.56	5
5	(Cayman Islands) Jaiden Reid	LSU	20.75	4
6	(United States) Johnnie Blockburger	USC	20.84	3
7	(Jamaica) Demar Francis	Baylor	21.00	2
	(United States) Jamarion Stubbs	Alabama State	DNS	

==== 400 meters ====
- Final results shown, not prelims

Placings in the men's 400 meters at the 2025 NCAA Division I Indoor Track and Field Championships
Rank	Name	University	Time	Team score
1st place, gold medalist(s)	(United States) Will Floyd	Georgia	45.43	10 FR
2nd place, silver medalist(s)	(Nigeria) Ezekiel Nathaniel	Baylor	45.44	8
3rd place, bronze medalist(s)	(United States) Auhmad Robinson	Texas A&M	45.54	6
4	(United States) Jayden Davis	Arizona State	45.56	5
5	(United States) William Jones	USC	45.86	4
6	(Jamaica) Shaemar Uter	Texas Tech	46.20	3
7	(South Africa) Antonie Nortje	Texas A&M	46.25	2
8	(United States) TJ Tomlyanovich	Arkansas	46.27	1

==== 800 meters ====
- Final results shown, not prelims

Placings in the men's 800 meters at the 2025 NCAA Division I Indoor Track and Field Championships
Rank	Name	University	Time	Team score
1st place, gold medalist(s)	(Canada) Matthew Erickson	Oregon	1:46.43	10
2nd place, silver medalist(s)	(Canada) Abdullahi Hassan	Mississippi State	1:46.65	8
3rd place, bronze medalist(s)	(United States) Aidan McCarthy	Cal Poly	1:46.78	6
4	(United States) Tinoda Matsatsa	Georgetown	1:47.05	5
5	(United States) Dan Watcke	Villanova	1:47.22	4
6	(Canada) Justin O'Toole	Washington	1:47.74	3
7	(United States) Darius Kipyego	Iowa State	1:48.79	2
8	(Canada) Olivier Desmeules	Penn State	1:48.84	1
	(United States) Cole Lindhorst	Washington	DNS	

==== Mile ====
- Final results shown, not prelims

Placings in the men's 1 mile at the 2025 NCAA Division I Indoor Track and Field Championships
Rank	Name	University	Time	Team score
1st place, gold medalist(s)	(United States) Abel Teffra	Georgetown	3:53.60	10 MR
2nd place, silver medalist(s)	(United States) Nathan Green	Washington	3:53.99	8
3rd place, bronze medalist(s)	(Canada) Foster Malleck	Boston University	3:54.42	6
4	(Morocco) Fouad Messaoudi	Oklahoma State	3:54.72	5
5	(United States) Isaiah Givens	Colorado	3:54.84	4 PB
6	(Republic of Ireland) Ronan McMahon-Staggs	Washington	3:55.52	3
7	(United States) Steven Jackson	Boston College	3:56.07	2
8	(United States) Colin Sahlman	Northern Arizona	3:57.02	1
9	(Germany) Benne Anderson	Syracuse	3:57.63	
10	(United States) Harrison Witt	Princeton	3:59.71	

==== 3000 meters ====
- Final results shown, not prelims

Placings in the men's 3000 meters at the 2025 NCAA Division I Indoor Track and Field Championships
Rank	Name	University	Time	Team score
1st place, gold medalist(s)	(United States) Ethan Strand	North Carolina	7:52.03	10
2nd place, silver medalist(s)	(United States) Gary Martin	Virginia	7:52.69	8
3rd place, bronze medalist(s)	(Australia) Adam Spencer	Wisconsin	7:52.71	6
4	(United States) Liam Murphy	Villanoa	7:53.38	5
5	(Kenya) Brian Musau	Oklahoma State	7:53.40	4
6	(United States) Parker Wolfe	North Carolina	7:53.98	3
7	(United States) Marco Langon	Villanova	7:54.25	2
8	(United States) Luke Tewalt	Wake Forest	7:54.42	1
9	(Eritrea) Habtom Samuel	New Mexico	7:54.42	
10	(United States) Matt Strangio	Portland State Vikings	7:55.41	
11	(Sudan) Yaseen Abdalla	Arkansas	7:56.04	
12	(United States) Drew Bosley	Northern Arizona	7:56.35	
13	(United Kingdom) George Couttie	Virginia Tech	7:57.77	
14	(Kenya) Ishmael Kipkurui	New Mexico	7:58.43	
15	(United States) Colton Sands	North Carolina	8:00.29	
16	(United States) Colin Sahlman	Northern Arizona	8:08.96	

==== 5000 meters ====
- Final results shown, not prelims

Placings in the men's 5000 meters at the 2025 NCAA Division I Indoor Track and Field Championships
Rank	Name	University	Time	Team score	Notes
1st place, gold medalist(s)	(Kenya) Brian Musau	Oklahoma State	13:11.34	10	MR
2nd place, silver medalist(s)	(Eritrea) Habtom Samuel	New Mexico	13:11.78	8	
3rd place, bronze medalist(s)	(United States) Rocky Hansen	Wake Forest	13:12.65	6	PB
4	(United States) Casey Clinger	BYU	13:13.46	5	PB
5	(Kenya) Denis Kipngetitch	Oklahoma State	13:13.71	4	PB
6	(United States) Marco Langon	Villanova	13:14.16	3	
7	(Kenya) Ishmael Kipkurui	New Mexico	13:15.14	2	PB
8	(United States) Creed Thompson	BYU	13:19.24	1	PB
9	(United States) Drew Bosley	Northern Arizona	13:21.28		
10	(Kenya) Evans Kurui	Washington State	13:23.28		
11	(United States) Liam Murphy	Villanova	13:23.91		
12	(United States) Joey Nokes	BYU	13:31.61		
13	(Spain) Said Mechaal	Iowa State	13:34.55		
14	(Kenya) Patrick Kiprop	Arkansas	13:35.62		
15	(Sudan) Yaseen Abdalla	Arkansas	13:44.03		
16	(South Africa) Sanele Masondo	Iowa State	DNF		

==== 60 meter hurdles ====
- Final results shown, not prelims

Placings in the men's 60 meter hurdles at the 2025 NCAA Division I Indoor Track and Field Championships
Rank	Name	University	Time	Team score
1st place, gold medalist(s)	(United States) Ja'Kobe Tharp	Auburn	7.45	10 FR
2nd place, silver medalist(s)	(Jamaica) Jerome Campbell	Northern Colorado	7.49	8 PB
3rd place, bronze medalist(s)	(United States) Malachi Snow	Texas Tech	7.54	6
4	(United States) Johnny Brackins	USC	7.54	5
5	(Jamaica) Jaheim Stern	LSU	7.55	4 PB
6	(The Bahamas) Antonie Andrews	Texas Tech	7.56	3
7	(United States) Ja'qualon Scott	Texas A&M	7.57	2
8	(Jamaica) Vashaun Vascinna	Arkansas	7.64	1

==== 4 x 400 meters relay ====
- Final results shown, not prelims

Placings in the men's 4x400 meter relay at the 2025 NCAA Division I Indoor Track and Field Championships
Rank	University	Time	Team score
1st place, gold medalist(s)	Georgia	3:03.44	10
2nd place, silver medalist(s)	Texas Tech	3:03.77	8
3rd place, bronze medalist(s)	Arizona State	3:03.88	6
4	USC	3:04.76	5
5	Mississippi State	3:05.39	4
6	BYU	3:05.56	3
7	Baylor	3:05.64	2
8	Florida	3:06.93	1
9	Virginia Tech	3:07.95	
10	Purdue	3:08.81	
11	Arkansas	3:47.69	
	Texas A&M	DQ	

==== Distance Medley Relay ====
- Final results shown, not prelims

Placings in the men's Distance Medley Relay at the 2025 NCAA Division I Indoor Track and Field Championships
Rank	University	Time	Team score
1st place, gold medalist(s)	Virginia	09:15.12	10
2nd place, silver medalist(s)	North Carolina	09:17.17	8
3rd place, bronze medalist(s)	Oregon	09:17.57	6
4	Texas A&M	09:17.74	5
5	BYU	09:18.31	4
6	Oklahoma State	09:20.10	3
7	Virginia Tech	09:21.69	2
8	Wisconsin	09:23.08	1
9	Wake Forest	09:24.13	
10	Princeton	09:27.25	
11	Washington	09:31.11	
12	Georgetown	09:42.30	

==== High Jump ====
- Final results shown, not prelims

Placings in the men's high jump at the 2025 NCAA Division I Indoor Track and Field Championships
Rank	Name	University	Best Jump	Team score
1st place, gold medalist(s)	(United States) Tyus Wilson	Nebraska	2.28 m (7 ft 5 3/4 in)	10 PB FR
2nd place, silver medalist(s)	(United States) Riyon Rankin	Georgia	2.19 m (7 ft 2 in)	8
3rd place, bronze medalist(s)	(United States) Arvesta Troupe	Ole Miss	2.19 m (7 ft 2 in)	6
4	(United States) Kyren Washington	Oklahoma	2.19 m (7 ft 2 in)	5
5	(United States) Elias Gerald	USC	2.19 m (7 ft 2 in)	4
5	(United States) Brady Palen	USC	2.19 m (7 ft 2 in)	3
5	(United States) Caleb Snowden	Arkansas-Pine Bluff	2.19 m (7 ft 2 in)	2
8	(Greece) Antrea Mita	Houston	2.16 m (7 ft 1 in)	1
9	(United States) Kason O'Riley	Texas State	2.16 m (7 ft 1 in)	
10	(United States) Mason Kooi	Nebraska	2.16 m (7 ft 1 in)	
11	(United States) Tito Alofe	Harvard	2.16 m (7 ft 1 in)	
12	(United States) Bradford (Bj) Jennings	Texas Tech	2.11 m (6 ft 11 in)	
12	(United States) Scottie Vines	Arkansas	2.11 m (6 ft 11 in)	
12	(Singapore) Kampton Kam	Penn	2.11 m (6 ft 11 in)	
12	(United States) Aiden Hayes	Texas State	2.11 m (6 ft 11 in)	
	(United States) Braden Goellner	Iowa State	NH	

==== Pole Vault ====
- Final results shown, not prelims

Placings in the men's pole vault at the 2025 NCAA Division I Indoor Track and Field Championships
Rank	Name	University	Best Jump	Team score
1st place, gold medalist(s)	(Norway) Simen Guttormsen	Duke	5.71 m (18 ft 8 3/4 in)	10
2nd place, silver medalist(s)	(United States) Kobe Babin	South Florida	5.66 m (18 ft 6 3/4 in)	8
3rd place, bronze medalist(s)	(United States) Hunter Garretson	Akron	5.66 m (18 ft 6 3/4 in)	6
4	(Russia) Aleksandr Solovev	Texas A&M	5.61 m (18 ft 4 3/4 in)	5
5	(South Africa) Kyle Rademeyer	South Alabama	5.61 m (18 ft 4 3/4 in)	4
6	(United States) Logan Hammer	Utah State	5.61 m (18 ft 4 3/4 in)	3 PB
7	(United States) Maddox Hamm	Virginia Tech	5.61 m (18 ft 4 3/4 in)	2 PB
8	(United States) Cody Johnston	Illinois	5.61 m (18 ft 4 3/4 in)	1 PB
9	(Estonia) Eerik Haamer	South Dakota	5.56 m (18 ft 2 3/4 in)	
10	(United States) Scott Toney	Washington	5.46 m (17 ft 10 3/4 in)	
11	(United States) Dyson Wicker	Nebraska	5.46 m (17 ft 10 3/4 in)	
12	(United States) Tyler Burns	California	5.46 m (17 ft 10 3/4 in)	
13	(United States) Cade Gray	Tennessee	5.46 m (17 ft 10 3/4 in)	
	(United States) Colby Wilson	Montana State	NH	
	(United States) Sean Gribble	Texas Tech	NH	
	(United States) Clayton Simms	Kansas	NH	

==== Long Jump ====
- Final results shown, not prelims

Placings in the men's long jump at the 2025 NCAA Division I Indoor Track and Field Championships
Rank	Name	University	Best Jump	Team score
1st place, gold medalist(s)	(Trinidad and Tobago) Kelsey Daniel	Texas	8.16 m (26 ft 9 1/4 in)	10 FR, NR
2nd place, silver medalist(s)	(Jamaica) Nikaoli Williams	Oklahoma	7.96 m (26 ft 1 1/4 in)	8
3rd place, bronze medalist(s)	(United States) Henry Kiner	Arkansas	7.91 m (25 ft 11 1/4 in)	6
4	(United States) Micah Larry	Georgia	7.89 m (25 ft 10 1/2 in)	5
5	(Saint Vincent and the Grenadines) Uroy Ryan	Arkansas	7.86 m (25 ft 9 1/4 in)	4
6	(United States) JC Stevenson	USC	7.83 m (25 ft 8 1/4 in)	3
7	(United States) Camryn O'Bannon	UCLA	7.65 m (25 ft 1 in)	2
8	(United States) Johnny Brackins	USC	7.57 m (24 ft 10 in)	1
9	(Puerto Rico) Reinaldo Rodríguez	Arizona	7.55 m (24 ft 9 in)	
10	(United States) Greg Foster	Princeton	7.45 m (24 ft 5 1/4 in)	
11	(United States) Solomon Washington	Texas	7.45 m (24 ft 5 1/4 in)	
12	(United States) Marc Morrison	Connecticut	7.41 m (24 ft 3 1/2 in)	
13	(United States) Jayden Keys	Georgia	7.41 m (24 ft 3 1/2 in)	
14	(British Virgin Islands) Khybah Dawson	Texas A&M	7.32 m (24 ft 0 in)	
14	(United States) Mason Mangum	Texas A&M	7.32 m (24 ft 0 in)	
16	(India) Lokesh Sathyanathan	Tarleton State	7.27 m (23 ft 10 in)	

==== Triple Jump ====
- Final results shown, not prelims

Placings in the men's triple jump at the 2025 NCAA Division I Indoor Track and Field Championships
Rank	Name	University	Best Jump	Team score
1st place, gold medalist(s)	(France) Jonathan Sermes	Missouri	17.04 m (55 ft 10 3/4 in)	10 FR
2nd place, silver medalist(s)	(United States) Micaylon Moore	Nebraska	16.52 m (54 ft 2 1/4 in)	8 PB
3rd place, bronze medalist(s)	(United States) Brandon Green Jr	Oklahoma	16.50 m (54 ft 1 1/2 in)	6
4	(Jamaica) Luke Brown	Kentucky	16.33 m (53 ft 6 3/4 in)	5
5	(Canada) Praise Aniamaka	Purdue	16.14 m (52 ft 11 1/4 in)	4
6	(Italy) Gabriele Tosti	Tarleton State	16.09 m (52 ft 9 1/4 in)	3 PB
7	(France) Alexandre Malanda	Kent State	16.05 m (52 ft 7 3/4 in)	2
8	(United States) Sterling Scott	Missouri	16.04 m (52 ft 7 1/4 in)	1
9	(United States) Floyd Whitaker	Oklahoma	15.90 m (52 ft 1 3/4 in)	
10	(United States) Kyle Johnson	Connecticut	15.82 m (51 ft 10 3/4 in)	
11	(United States) Gavin Champ	Texas A&M	15.74 m (51 ft 7 1/2 in)	
12	(United States) Garison Breeding	Texas Tech	15.71 m (51 ft 6 1/2 in)	
13	(United States) Stacy Brown	Texas Tech	15.52 m (50 ft 11 in)	
14	(Jamaica) Astkey Davis	Cincinnati	15.50 m (50 ft 10 in)	
15	(Estonia) Viktor Morozov	Illinois	15.49 m (50 ft 9 3/4 in)	
16	(Jamaica) Apalos Edwards	Arkansas	15.40 m (50 ft 6 1/4 in)	

==== Shot Put ====
- Final results shown, not prelims

Placings in the men's shot put at the 2025 NCAA Division I Indoor Track and Field Championships
Rank	Name	University	Best Throw	Team score
1st place, gold medalist(s)	(United States) Tarik Robinson-O'Hagan	Ole Miss	20.49 m (67 ft 2 1/2 in)	10 FR
2nd place, silver medalist(s)	(United States) Christopher Licata	South Carolina	20.46 m (67 ft 1 1/2 in)	8 PB
3rd place, bronze medalist(s)	(United States) Jason Swarens	Wisconsin	20.40 m (66 ft 11 in)	6 PB
4	(United States) Dylan Taggart	South Carolina	19.74 m (64 ft 9 in)	5
5	(United States) Tyler Sudduth	Illinois	19.68 m (64 ft 6 3/4 in)	4
6	(France) Fred Moudani-Likbi	Cincinnati	19.63 m (64 ft 4 3/4 in)	3
7	(United States) Joseph White	Wisconsin	19.27 m (63 ft 2 1/2 in)	2
8	(United States) Thomas Kitchell	North Carolina	19.19 m (62 ft 11 1/2 in)	1
9	(United States) Zach Landa	Arizona	19.17 m (62 ft 10 1/2 in)	
10	(Trinidad and Tobago) Christopher Crawford	Alabama	19.04 m (62 ft 5 1/2 in)	
11	(United States) Maxwell Otterdahl	Nebraska	18.81 m (61 ft 8 1/2 in)	
12	(United States) Danny Bryant	BYU	18.73 m (61 ft 5 1/4 in)	
13	(Jamaica) Ralford Mullings	Oklahoma	18.16 m (59 ft 6 3/4 in)	
14	(United States) Henry Buckles	Texas State	17.72 m (58 ft 1 1/2 in)	
15	(United States) Tyler Michelini	Arizona	17.64 m (57 ft 10 1/4 in)	
16	(United States) Texas Tanner	Air Force	17.38 m (57 ft 1/4 in)	

==== Weight Throw ====
- Final results shown, not prelims

Placings in the men's weight throw at the 2025 NCAA Division I Indoor Track and Field Championships
Rank	Name	University	Best Throw	Team score
1st place, gold medalist(s)	(United States) Daniel Reynolds	Wyoming	25.08 m (82 ft 3 1/4 in)	10 MR
2nd place, silver medalist(s)	(United States) Trey Knight	CSUN	24.49 m (80 ft 4 in)	8
3rd place, bronze medalist(s)	(United States) Ryan Johnson	Iowa	24.48 m (80 ft 3 3/4 in)	6
4	(Canada) Jeremiah Nubbe	Virginia	24.17 m (79 ft 3 1/2 in)	5
5	(United States) Tarik Robinson-O'Hagan	Ole Miss	24.09 m (79 ft 1/4 in)	4
6	(United Kingdom) Kenneth Ikeji	Harvard	24.02 m (78 ft 9 1/2 in)	3
7	(United Kingdom) Ruben Banks	Alabama	22.90 m (75 ft 1 1/2 in)	2
8	(United States) Henry Zimmerman	Nebraska	22.71 m (74 ft 6 in)	1
9	(United States) Christian Johnson	Duke	22.47 m (73 ft 8 1/2 in)	
10	(United States) Joseph White	Wisconsin	22.06 m (72 ft 4 1/2 in)	
11	(United States) Desmond Lott	Northern Arizona	21.82 m (71 ft 7 in)	
12	(United States) Paden Lewis	Southeast Missouri	21.39 m (70 ft 2 in)	
13	(United States) Cam Jones	Iowa	21.28 m (69 ft 9 3/4 in)	
14	(United States) Sam Ines	Missouri	20.97 m (68 ft 9 1/2 in)	
15	(Canada) Terell Webb	Southeastern Louisiana	20.37 m (66 ft 9 3/4 in)	
	(United States) Texas Tanner	Air Force	NM	

==== Heptathlon ====
- Final results shown, not prelims

Placings in the men's Heptathlon at the 2025 NCAA Division I Indoor Track and Field Championships
Rank	Name	University	Overall points	60 m	LJ	SP	HJ	60 m H	PV	1000 m
1st place, gold medalist(s)	(United States) Peyton Bair	Mississippi State	6013	977; 6.74	795; 6.92 m (22 ft 8 1/4 in)	754; 14.42 m (47 ft 3 1/2 in)	831; 2.03 m (6 ft 7 3/4 in)	979; 8.01	871; 4.87 m (15 ft 11 1/2 in)	806; 2:46.21
2nd place, silver medalist(s)	(United Kingdom) Jack Turner	Arkansas	5962	879; 7.01	903; 7.37 m (24 ft 2 in)	704; 13.61 m (44 ft 7 3/4 in)	803; 2.00 m (6 ft 6 1/2 in)	939; 8.17	810; 4.67 m (15 ft 3 3/4 in)	924; 2:35.49
3rd place, bronze medalist(s)	(Portugal) Edgar Campré	Miami	5934	922; 6.89	854; 7.17 m (23 ft 6 1/4 in)	820; 15.50 m (50 ft 10 in)	696; 1.88 m (6 ft 2 in)	1012; 7.88	901; 4.97 m (16 ft 3 1/2 in)	729; 2:53.56
4	(United States) Ben Barton	BYU	5898	929; 6.87	864; 7.21 m (23 ft 7 3/4 in)	688; 13.34 m (43 ft 9 in)	859; 2.06 m (6 ft 9 in)	1007; 7.90	781; 4.57 m (14 ft 11 3/4 in)	770; 2:49.57
5	(United States) Carter Morton	Northern Iowa	5852	844; 7.11	905; 7.38 m (24 ft 2 1/2 in)	629; 12.38 m (40 ft 7 1/4 in)	887; 2.09 m (6 ft 10 1/4 in)	913; 8.28	901; 4.97 m (16 ft 3 1/2 in)	773; 2:49.29
6	(Norway) Abraham Vogelsang	Iowa	5810	813; 7.20	818; 7.02 m (23 ft 1/4 in)	712; 13.74 m (45 ft 3/4 in)	776; 1.97 m (6 ft 5 1/2 in)	977; 8.02	932; 5.07 m (16 ft 7 1/2 in)	782; 2:48.45
7	(United States) Kenneth Byrd	Louisville	5807	847; 7.10	869; 7.23 m (23 ft 8 1/2 in)	643; 12.60 m (41 ft 4 in)	776; 1.97 m (6 ft 5 1/2 in)	927; 8.22	994; 5.27 m (17 ft 3 1/4 in)	751; 2:51.35
8	(United States) Justin Abrams	Cincinnati	5799	861; 7.06	783; 6.87 m (22 ft 6 1/4 in)	668; 13.01 m (42 ft 8 in)	803; 2.00 m (6 ft 6 1/2 in)	927; 8.02	994; 5.27 m (17 ft 3 1/4 in)	736; 2:50.28
9	(Germany) Alexander Jung	Kansas	5752	854; 07.08	774; 6.83 m (22 ft 4 3/4 in)	806; 15.26 m (50 ft 3/4 in)	696; 1.88 m (6 ft 2 in)	925; 8.23	840; 4.77 m (15 ft 7 3/4 in)	857; 2:41.47
10	(United States) Thai Thompson	Iowa State	5690	875; 7.02	838; 7.10 m (23 ft 3 1/2 in)	557; 11.18 m (36 ft 8 in)	749; 1.94 m (6 ft 4 1/4 in)	900; 8.33	871; 4.87 m (15 ft 11 1/2 in)	900; 2:37.63
11	(United States) Blake Harris	Texas A&M	5659	907; 6.93	835; 7.09 m (23 ft 3 in)	631; 12.40 m (40 ft 8 in)	723; 1.91 m (6 ft 3 in)	1002; 7.92	781; 4.57 m (14 ft 11 3/4 in)	780; 2:48.64
12	(United Kingdom) Jami Schlueter	Washington	5619	889; 6.98	723; 6.61 m (21 ft 8 in)	808; 15.29 m (50 ft 1 3/4 in)	723; 1.91 m (6 ft 3 in)	925; 8.23	781; 4.57 m (14 ft 11 3/4 in)	770; 2:49.53
13	(Canada) Nathaniel Paris	Virginia Tech	5617	886; 6.99	891; 7.32 m (24 ft 0 in)	617; 12.17 m (39 ft 11 in)	803; 2.00 m (6 ft 6 1/2 in)	920; 8.25	751; 4.47 m (14 ft 7 3/4 in)	749; 2:51.57
14	(Canada) Cole Wilson	High Point	5571	826; 7.16	818; 7.02 m (23 ft 1/4 in)	706; 13.64 m (44 ft 9 in)	776; 1.97 m (6 ft 5 1/2 in)	903; 8.32	801; 4.67 m (15 ft 3 3/4 in)	732; 2:53.26
15	(United States) Seth Johnson	California	5441	889; 6.98	757; 6.76 m (22 ft 2 in)	613; 12.11 m (39 ft 8 3/4 in)	776; 1.97 m (6 ft 5 1/2 in)	974; 8.03	637; 4.07 m (13 ft 4 in)	795; 2:47.24
	(Netherlands) Jip de Greef	Illinois	DNF	879; 7.01	0 NM	0 DNS	0 DNS	0 DNS	0 DNS	0 DNS

=== Men's team scores ===
- Top 10 and ties shown

Top 10 men's team scores at the 2025 NCAA Division I Indoor Track and Field Championships
Rank	University	Team score
1st place, gold medalist(s)	USC	39 points
2nd place, silver medalist(s)	Georgia	33 points
3rd place, bronze medalist(s)	Auburn	32 points
4	Arkansas	30 points
5	Oklahoma State	26 points
6	Miss State	23 points
6	Virginia	23 points
8	North Carolina	22 points
8	Texas Tech	22 points
10	Ole Miss	20 points
10	Texas A&M	20 points

=== Women's results ===
==== 60 meters ====
- Final results shown, not prelims

Placings in the women's 60 meters at the 2025 NCAA Division I Indoor Track and Field Championships
Rank	Name	University	Time	Team score
1st place, gold medalist(s)	(United States) Dajaz DeFrand	USC	7.09	10 PB FR
2nd place, silver medalist(s)	(United States) Jadyn Mays	Oregon	7.12	8 SB
3rd place, bronze medalist(s)	(United States) Kaila Jackson	Georgia	7.15	6
4	(United States) India Mayberry	TCU	7.17	5
5	(United States) Samirah Moody	USC	7.17	4
6	(United States) Alexis Brown	Baylor	7.24	3
7	(Jamaica) Shenese Walker	Florida State	7.27	2
DNS	(Jamaica) Brianna Lyston	LSU	DNS	1

==== 200 meters ====
- Final results shown, not prelims

Placings in the women's 200 meters at the 2025 NCAA Division I Indoor Track and Field Championships
Rank	Name	University	Time	Team score
1st place, gold medalist(s)	(United States) India Mayberry	TCU	22.30	10 FR
2nd place, silver medalist(s)	(United States) Jaydn Mays	Oregon	22.45	8 PB
3rd place, bronze medalist(s)	(United States) JaMeesia Ford	South Carolina	22.55	6
4	(United States) Dajaz Defrand	USC	22.70	5
5	(United States) Madison Whyte	USC	22.80	4
6	(Jamaica) Niesha Burgher	UTEP	22.84	3
7	(United States) Kaila Jackson	Georgia	22.96	2
8	(United States) Kelly Ufodiama	East Carolina	23.19	1

==== 400 meters ====
- Final results shown, not prelims

Placings in the women's 400 meters at the 2025 NCAA Division I Indoor Track and Field Championships
Rank	Name	University	Time	Team score
1st place, gold medalist(s)	(United States) Isabella Whittaker	Arkansas	49.24	10 AR MR
2nd place, silver medalist(s)	(United States) Aaliyah Butler	Georgia	49.97	8
3rd place, bronze medalist(s)	(Jamaica) Dejanea Oakley	Georgia	51.14	6
4	(Canada) Savannah Sutherland	Michigan	51.23	5 PB
5	(United States) Rachel Joseph	Iowa State	51.58	4
6	(Zimbabwe) Vimbayi Maisvoreva	Auburn	51.66	3
7	(United States) Zaya Akins	South Carolina	52.12	2
8	(Nigeria) Ella Onojuvwevwo	LSU	52.18	1

==== 800 meters ====
- Final results shown, not prelims

Placings in the women's 800 meters at the 2025 NCAA Division I Indoor Track and Field Championships
Rank	Name	University	Time	Team score
1st place, gold medalist(s)	(United States) Makayla Paige	North Carolina	2:00.39	10 FR
2nd place, silver medalist(s)	(United States) Victoria Bossong	Harvard	2:00.93	8
3rd place, bronze medalist(s)	(United States) Roisin Willis	Stanford	2:01.00	6
4	(United States) Michaela Rose	LSU	2:02.19	5
5	(Germany) Smilla Kolbe	North Florida	2:02.44	4
6	(United States) Gabriella Grissom	Miami	2:02.46	3
7	(United States) Sophia Gorriaran	Harvard	2:02.57	2
8	(Kenya) Gladys Chepngetich	Clemson	2:02.60	1

==== Mile ====
- Final results shown, not prelims

Placings in the women's 1 mile at the 2025 NCAA Division I Indoor Track and Field Championships
Rank	Name	University	Time	Team score
1st place, gold medalist(s)	(Sweden) Wilma Nielsen	Oregon	4:32.40	10
2nd place, silver medalist(s)	(United Kingdom) Mena Scatchard	Princeton	4:32.87	8
3rd place, bronze medalist(s)	(United States) Maggi Congdon	Northern Arizona	4:32.88	6
4	(Turkey) Silan Ayyildiz	Oregon	4:33.98	5
5	(Netherlands) Amina Maatoug	Washington	4:34.03	4
6	(United States) Chloe Forster	Washington	4:34.18	3
7	(United States) Melissa Riggins	Georgetown	4:35.06	2
8	(Sweden) Vera Sjöberg	Boston University	4:35.34	1
9	(Mexico) Lorena Rangel Batres	LSU	4:35.35	
10	(United States) Margot Appleton	Virginia	4:36.01	

==== 3000 meters ====
- Final results shown, not prelims

Placings in the women's 3000 meters at the 2025 NCAA Division I Indoor Track and Field Championships
Rank	Name	University	Time	Team score
1st place, gold medalist(s)	(Canada) Ceili McCabe	West Virginia	9:01.18	10 FR
2nd place, silver medalist(s)	(Kenya) Doris Lemngole	Alabama	9:01.64	8
3rd place, bronze medalist(s)	(United States) Lexy Halladay-Lowry	BYU	9:03.20	6
4	(Netherlands) Amina Maatoug	Washington	9:03.34	5
5	(United States) Grace Hartman	NC State	9:03.37	4
6	(New Zealand) Kimberly May	Providence	9:03.51	3
7	(United States) Paityn Noe	Arkansas	9:03.78	2
8	(United States) Elise Stearns	Northern Arizona	9:04.01	1
9	(United States) Sophia Kennedy	Stanford	9:04.07	
10	(New Zealand) Hannah Gapes	NC State	9:04.35	
11	(Kenya) Pamela Kosgei	New Mexico	9:04.42	
12	(United States) Riley Chamberlain	BYU	9:06.63	
13	(United States) Margot Appleton	Virginia	9:08.02	
14	(United Kingdom) Amy Bunnage	Stanford	9:11.87	
15	(United Kingdom) Shannon Flockhart	Providence	9:12.33	
DNF	(Turkey) Şilan Ayyildiz	Oregon	DNF	

==== 5000 meters ====
- Final results shown, not prelims

Placings in the women's 5000 meters at the 2025 NCAA Division I Indoor Track and Field Championships
Rank	Name	University	Time	Team score
1st place, gold medalist(s)	(Kenya) Doris Lemngole	Alabama	15:05.93	10 FR
2nd place, silver medalist(s)	(United States) Lexy Halladay-Lowry	BYU	15:06.17	8
3rd place, bronze medalist(s)	(Kenya) Pamela Kosgei	New Mexico	15:07.57	6
4	(United States) Elise Stearns	Northern Arizona	15:08.07	5 PB
5	(United States) Sophia Kennedy	Stanford	15:10.71	4 PB
6	(United States) Grace Hartman	NC State	15:11.10	3 PB
7	(Kenya) Hilda Olemomoi	Florida	15:11.33	2
8	(United States) Paityn Noe	Arkansas	15:11.89	1
9	(United States) Chloe Scrimgeour	Georgetown	15:14.07	PB
10	(Canada) Jadyn Keeler	North Dakota	15:31.63	
11	(United States) Lucy Jenks	Georgetown	15:33.09	
12	(United Kingdom) Alex Millard	Providence	15:34.36	
13	(Canada) Florence Caron	Penn State	15:48.73	
14	(United States) Ali Upshaw	Northern Arizona	15:55.49	
	(Australia) Amy Bunnage	Stanford	DNF	
	(Canada) Siona Chisholm	Notre Dame	DNF	

==== 60 meter hurdles ====
- Final results shown, not prelims

Placings in the women's 60 meter hurdles at the 2025 NCAA Division I Indoor Track and Field Championships
Rank	Name	University	Time	Team score
1st place, gold medalist(s)	(United States) Jaiya Covington	Texas A&M	7.90	10 PB FR
2nd place, silver medalist(s)	(United States) Aaliyah McCormick	Oregon	7.91	8 PB
3rd place, bronze medalist(s)	(Jamaica) Oneka Wilson	Clemson	7.99	6
4	(Brazil) Micaela de Mello	Washington State	8.02	5
5	(United States) Layla Anderson	Tennessee	8.03	4
6	(Saint Lucia) Aasia Laurencin	Michigan	8.09	3
7	(United States) Kiara Smith	Tennessee	8.14	2
8	(Belgium) Yanla Ndjip-Nyemeck	UCLA	8.15	1

==== 4 x 400 meters relay ====
- Final results shown, not prelims

Placings in the women's 4 x 400 meters relay at the 2025 NCAA Division I Indoor Track and Field Championships
Rank	University	Time	Team score
1st place, gold medalist(s)	Arkansas	3:25.20	10 SB FR
2nd place, silver medalist(s)	Georgia	3:26.07	8 SB
3rd place, bronze medalist(s)	USC	3:26.97	6 SB
4	Tennessee	3:27.25	5 SB
5	Texas A&M	3:30.06	4
6	Harvard	3:30.49	3
7	Harvard	3:30.59	2
8	Texas	3:30.65	1
9	UCF	3:31.32	
10	South Carolina	3:47.74	
11	UCLA	3:53.51	
DQ	Florida State	DQ	

==== Distance Medley Relay ====
- Final results shown, not prelims

Placings in the women's distance medley relay at the 2025 NCAA Division I Indoor Track and Field Championships
Rank	University	Time	Team score
1st place, gold medalist(s)	BYU	10:45.34	10 FR MR
2nd place, silver medalist(s)	Oregon	10:45.99	8
3rd place, bronze medalist(s)	Providence	10:46.28	6 SB
4	LSU	10:47.17	5 SB
5	Utah	10:53.50	4
6	NC State	10:55.11	3
7	Harvard	11:02.26	2
8	Washington	11:02.31	1
9	North Carolina	11:02.57	
10	Northern Arizona	11:06.71	
11	Georgetown	11:10.88	
12	Stanford	11:14.43	

==== High Jump ====
- Final results shown, not prelims

Placings in the women's high jump at the 2025 NCAA Division I Indoor Track and Field Championships
Rank	Name	University	Best Jump	Team score
1st place, gold medalist(s)	(Nigeria) Temitope Adeshina	Texas Tech	1.94 m (6 ft 4 1/4 in)	10 FR
1st place, gold medalist(s)	(Cyprus) Elena Kulichenko	Georgia	1.94 m (6 ft 4 1/4 in)	8 FR
3rd place, bronze medalist(s)	(United States) Rachel Glenn	Arkansas	1.91 m (6 ft 3 in)	6
4	(United States) Emma Gates	Arizona	1.88 m (6 ft 2 in)	5
5	(United States) Cheyla Scott	South Carolina	1.85 m (6 ft 3/4 in)	4
6	(South Africa) Kristi Perez-Snyman	Missouri	1.85 m (6 ft 3/4 in)	3
6	(Ghana) Rose Yeboah	Illinois	1.85 m (6 ft 3/4 in)	2
8	(United States) Evelyn Lavielle	Texas Tech	1.85 m (6 ft 3/4 in)	1
8	(Grenada) Ahshareah Enoe	Kansas State	1.85 m (6 ft 3/4 in)	
10	(United States) Jenna Rogers	Nebraska	1.80 m (5 ft 10 3/4 in)	
10	(United States) Paris Minkinski	Arizona	1.80 m (5 ft 10 3/4 in)	
12	(United States) Sydney Billington	Arkansas	1.80 m (5 ft 10 3/4 in)	
12	(United States) Madison Schmidt	Notre Dame Fighting Irish	1.80 m (5 ft 10 3/4 in)	
14	(Czech Republic) Bára Sajdoková	Illinois	1.80 m (5 ft 10 3/4 in)	
15	(United States) Alyssa Jones	Stanford	1.75 m (5 ft 8 3/4 in)	
15	(Mexico) Claudina Diaz	Missouri	1.75 m (5 ft 8 3/4 in)	

==== Pole Vault ====
- Final results shown, not prelims

Placings in the women's pole vault at the 2025 NCAA Division I Indoor Track and Field Championships
Rank	Name	University	Best Jump	Team score
1st place, gold medalist(s)	(United States) Amanda Moll	Washington	4.70 m (15 ft 5 in)	10 MR
2nd place, silver medalist(s)	(United States) Hana Moll	Washington	4.70 m (15 ft 5 in)	8
3rd place, bronze medalist(s)	(United States) Olivia Lueking	Oklahoma	4.55 m (14 ft 11 in)	6
4	(United States) Mason Meinershagen	Kansas	4.50 m (14 ft 9 in)	5
5	(United States) Julia Fixsen	Virginia Tech	4.40 m (14 ft 5 in)	4
6	(Germany) Sarah Schmitt	Tennessee	4.40 m (14 ft 5 in)	3
7	(United States) Sydney Horn	High Point	4.40 m (14 ft 5 in)	1
7	(United States) Tori Thomas	Illinois	4.40 m (14 ft 5 in)	1
7	(United States) Tenly Kuhn	Baylor	4.40 m (14 ft 5 in)	1
10	(United States) Chloe Timberg	Rutgers	4.40 m (14 ft 5 in)	
11	(United States) Abby Knouff	Cincinnati	4.25 m (13 ft 11 1/4 in)	
11	(United States) Erica Ellis	Kansas	4.25 m (13 ft 11 1/4 in)	
11	(United States) Tatum Moku	Washington State	4.25 m (13 ft 11 1/4 in)	
14	(United States) Molly Haywood	Baylor	4.25 m (13 ft 11 1/4 in)	
	(United States) Maren Garnett	BYU	NH	
	(United States) Natalie Lark	Louisville	NH	

==== Long Jump ====
- Final results shown, not prelims

Placings in the women's long jump at the 2025 NCAA Division I Indoor Track and Field Championships
Rank	Name	University	Best Jump	Team score
1st place, gold medalist(s)	(United States) Alexis Brown	Baylor	6.90 m (22 ft 7 1/2 in)	10 PB FR
2nd place, silver medalist(s)	(United States) Tacoria Humphrey	Illinois	6.75 m (22 ft 1 1/2 in)	8
3rd place, bronze medalist(s)	(United States) Alyssa Jones	Stanford	6.71 m (22 ft 0 in)	6 SB
4	(The Bahamas) Anthaya Charlton	Florida	6.71 m (22 ft 0 in)	5
5	(United States) Sophia Beckmon	Illinois	6.67 m (21 ft 10 1/2 in)	4
6	(United States) Jasmine Akina	Oklahoma	6.58 m (21 ft 7 in)	3
7	(Jamaica) Nia Robinson	Arkansas	6.45 m (21 ft 1 3/4 in)	2
8	Prestina Ochonogor	Tarleton State	6.43 m (21 ft 1 in)	1
9	(Jamaica) Aaliyah Foster	Texas	6.37 m (20 ft 10 3/4 in)	
10	(Norway) Ida Breigan	UTSA	6.35 m (20 ft 10 in)	
11	(United Kingdom) Funminiyi Olajide	Arkansas	6.32 m (20 ft 8 3/4 in)	
12	(Sweden) Emilia Sjöstrand	San Jose State University	6.25 m (20 ft 6 in)	
13	(Estonia) Lishanna Ilves	Nebraska	6.15 m (20 ft 2 in)	
14	(Jamaica) Machaeda Linton	LSU	6.07 m (19 ft 10 3/4 in)	
15	(United States) Morgan Smalls	Illinois	6.05 m (19 ft 10 in)	
16	(Latvia) Darja Sopova	Illinois	DNS	

==== Triple Jump ====
- Final results shown, not prelims

Placings in the women's triple jump at the 2025 NCAA Division I Indoor Track and Field Championships
Rank	Name	University	Best Jump	Team score
1st place, gold medalist(s)	(United States) Agur Dwol	Oklahoma	13.72 m (45 ft 0 in)	10
2nd place, silver medalist(s)	(United States) Tamaiah Washington	Texas Tech	13.72 m (45 ft 0 in)	8 PB
3rd place, bronze medalist(s)	(United Kingdom) Temitope Ojora	USC	13.70 m (44 ft 11 1/4 in)	6
4	(Kenya) Winny Bll	Texas A&M	13.63 m (44 ft 8 1/2 in)	5
5	(Jamaica) Shantae Foreman	Clemson	13.62 m (44 ft 8 in)	4
6	(United States) Eupheine Andre	Missouri	13.55 m (44 ft 5 1/4 in)	3 PB
7	(United States) Jasmine Akins	Oklahoma	13.43 m (44 ft 1/2 in)	2
8	(United States) Simone Johnson	San Jose State	13.40 m (43 ft 11 1/2 in)	1
9	(Sweden) Emilia Sjöstrand	San Jose State	13.31 m (43 ft 8 in)	
10	(Canada) Asia Phillips	Florida	13.11 m (43 ft 0 in)	
11	(France) Daniela Wamokpego	Iowa	13.03 m (42 ft 8 3/4 in)	
12	(United States) Ryann Porter	Oregon	13.00 m (42 ft 7 3/4 in)	
13	(Jamaica) Rhianna Phipps	Nebraska	12.98 m (42 ft 7 in)	
14	(Jamaica) Machaeda Linton	LSU	12.93 m (42 ft 5 in)	
15	(United States) Suzan Ogunleye	Texas Tech	12.88 m (42 ft 3 in)	
16	(Jamaica) Nia Robinson	Arkansas	12.78 m (41 ft 11 in)	

==== Shot Put ====
- Final results shown, not prelims

Placings in the women's shot put at the 2025 NCAA Division I Indoor Track and Field Championships
Rank	Name	University	Best Throw	Team score
1st place, gold medalist(s)	(Sweden) Axelina Johansson	Nebraska	19.28 m (63 ft 3 in)	10 FR
2nd place, silver medalist(s)	(United States) Jaida Ross	Oregon	18.98 m (62 ft 3 in)	8 PR
3rd place, bronze medalist(s)	(United States) KeAyla Dove	Houston	18.91 m (62 ft 1/4 in)	6
4	(United States) Mya Lesnar	Colorado	18.20 m (59 ft 8 1/2 in)	5
5	(Germany) Nina Chioma	Texas	18.14 m (59 ft 6 in)	4
6	(United States) Jayden Ulrich	Louisville	18.07 m (59 ft 3 1/4 in)	3
7	(United States) Abria Smith	Illinois	17.99 m (59 ft 1/4 in)	2 PB
8	(United States) Kalynn Meyer	Nebraska	17.68 m (58 ft 0 in)	1 PB
9	(United States) Akoma Odeluga	Ole Miss	17.26 m (56 ft 7 1/2 in)	
10	(South Africa) Miné de Klerk	Nebraska	17.15 m (56 ft 3 in)	
11	(Dominica) Treneese Hamilton	Alabama	17.01 m (55 ft 9 1/2 in)	
12	(United States) Elizabeth Tapper	Michigan	16.90 m (55 ft 5 1/4 in)	
13	(United States) Melanie Duron	Texas State	16.74 m (54 ft 11 in)	
14	(United States) MyeJoi Williams	Alabama	16.71 m (54 ft 9 3/4 in)	
15	(United States) Paige Low	Oklahoma	16.70 m (54 ft 9 1/4 in)	
16	(United States) Gabriella Morris	Colorado State	16.57 m (54 ft 4 1/4 in)	

==== Weight Throw ====
- Final results shown, not prelims

Placings in the women's weight throw at the 2025 NCAA Division I Indoor Track and Field Championships
Rank	Name	University	Best Throw	Team score
1st place, gold medalist(s)	(United States) Taylor Kesner	Wisconsin	23.50 m (77 ft 1 in)	10 FR
2nd place, silver medalist(s)	(Iceland) Guðrún Hallgriísdóttir	VCU	23.19 m (76 ft 3/4 in)	8 NR
3rd place, bronze medalist(s)	(South Africa) Phethisang Makhethe	Illinois	23.08 m (75 ft 8 1/2 in)	6
4	(United States) Giavonna Meeks	California	23.00 m (75 ft 5 1/2 in)	5
5	(United States) Shelby Frank	Texas Tech	22.91 m (75 ft 1 3/4 in)	4
6	(United States) Chloe Lindeman	Wisconsin	22.74 m (74 ft 7 1/4 in)	3
7	(United States) Jordan Koskondy	Illinois	22.48 m (73 ft 9 in)	2 PB
8	(Finland) Sara Killnen	Virginia Tech	22.31 m (73 ft 2 1/4 in)	1
9	(United States) Hadley Streit	Minnesota	22.03 m (72 ft 3 1/4 in)	
10	(United States) Kenna Curry	North Dakota	21.78 m (71 ft 5 1/4 in)	
11	(United States) Annie Nabwe	Minnesota	21.59 m (70 ft 10 in)	
12	(United States) Michelle Ogbemudia	Arkansas State	21.37 m (70 ft 1 1/4 in)	
13	(United States) Michaëlle Valentin	FIU	21.27 m (69 ft 9 1/4 in)	
14	(United States) Maura Huwalt	Auburn	21.12 m (69 ft 3 1/4 in)	
15	(United States) Kate Powers	Kentucky	21.07 m (69 ft 1 1/2 in)	
16	(United States) Elle Adrian	Michigan State	21.03 m (68 ft 11 3/4 in)	

==== Pentathlon ====
- Final results shown, not prelims

Placings in the women's pentathlon at the 2025 NCAA Division I Indoor Track and Field Championships
Rank	Name	University	Overall points	60 m H	HJ	SP	LJ	800 m
1st place, gold medalist(s)	(United States) Jadin O'Brien	Notre Dame	4596	1093 8.16	842 1.69 m (5 ft 6 1/2 in)	827 14.50 m (47 ft 6 3/4 in)	908 6.19 m (20 ft 3 1/2 in)	926 2:12.65
2nd place, silver medalist(s)	(Russia) Sofia Iakushina	Texas A&M	4412	1055 8.33	1029 1.84 m (6 ft 1/4 in)	641 11.69 m (38 ft 4 in)	792 5.81 m (19 ft 1/2 in)	895 2:14.87
3rd place, bronze medalist(s)	(Estonia) Pippi Lotta Enok	Oklahoma	4375	1028 8.45	916 1.75 m (5 ft 8 3/4 in)	673 12.18 m (39 ft 11 1/2 in)	905 6.18 m (20 ft 3 1/4 in)	853 2:17.84
4	(France) Pauline Bikembo	Iowa	4331	987 8.64	916 1.75 m (5 ft 8 3/4 in)	649 11.82 m (38 ft 9 1/4 in)	921 6.23 m (20 ft 5 1/4 in)	858 2:17.46
5	(Sweden) Angel Richmore	Oklahoma	4310	967 8.73	916 1.75 m (5 ft 8 3/4 in)	801 14.10 m (46 ft 3 in)	853 6.01 m (19 ft 8 1/2 in)	773 2:23.74
6	(Canada) Izzy Goudros	Harvard	4305	1002 8.57	842 1.69 m (5 ft 6 1/2 in)	638 11.65 m (38 ft 2 1/2 in)	905 6.18 m (20 ft 3 1/4 in)	918 2:13.25
7	(United States) Jenelle Rogers	Ball State	4265	976 8.69	916 1.75 m (5 ft 8 3/4 in)	830 14.54 m (47 ft 8 1/4 in)	819 5.90 m (19 ft 4 1/4 in)	724 2:27.52
8	(United States) Jalen Elrod	Purdue	4233	1037 8.41	771 1.63 m (5 ft 4 in)	630 11.53 m (37 ft 9 3/4 in)	853 6.01 m (19 ft 8 1/2 in)	942 2:11.56
9	(United States) Maddie Pitts	Penn State	4229	1044 8.38	771 1.63 m (5 ft 4 in)	654 11.90 m (39 ft 1/2 in)	853 6.01 m (19 ft 8 1/2 in)	907 2:13.99
10	(Germany) Jenna Fee Feyerabend	San Diego State	4202	944 8.84	879 1.72 m (5 ft 7 1/2 in)	757 13.45 m (44 ft 1 1/2 in)	807 5.86 m (19 ft 2 1/2 in)	815 2:20.65
11	(Germany) Lucie Kienast	Illinois	4201	929 8.91	842 1.69 m (5 ft 6 1/2 in)	759 13.48 m (44 ft 2 1/2 in)	813 5.88 m (19 ft 3 1/4 in)	858 2:17.45
12	(United States) Meredith Engle	Liberty	4122	967 8.73	842 1.69 m (5 ft 6 1/2 in)	721 12.91 m (42 ft 4 1/4 in)	750 5.67 m (18 ft 7 in)	842 2:18.63
13	(United Kingdom) Ella Rush	Georgia	4051	971 8.71	806 1.66 m (5 ft 5 1/4 in)	648 11.80 m (38 ft 8 1/2 in)	831 5.94 m (19 ft 5 3/4 in)	795 2:22.10
14	(Norway) Mia Lien	UTSA	4031	948 8.82	916 1.75 m (5 ft 8 3/4 in)	465 9.01 m (29 ft 6 1/2 in)	877 6.09 m (19 ft 11 3/4 in)	825 2:19.90
15	(United States) Alaina Brady	Notre Dame	3956	1021 8.48	771 1.63 m (5 ft 4 in)	739 13.18 m (43 ft 2 3/4 in)	709 5.53 m (18 ft 1 1/2 in)	716 2:28.19
16	(United States) Shelby Schweyen	Montana State	3789	965 8.74	736 1.60 m (5 ft 2 3/4 in)	667 12.09 m (39 ft 7 3/4 in)	631 5.26 m (17 ft 3 in)	790 2:22.46

=== Women's team scores ===
- Top 10 and ties shown

Top 10 women's team scores at the 2025 NCAA Division I Indoor Track and Field Championships
Rank	University	Team score
1st place, gold medalist(s)	Oregon	55 points
2nd place, silver medalist(s)	Georgia	39 points
3rd place, bronze medalist(s)	USC	35 points
4	Oklahoma	31 points
4	Washington	31 points
4	Arkansas	31 points
7	Texas A&M	27 points
8	Illinois	25.5 points
9	BYU	24 points
10	Texas Tech	21.5 points

== Schedule ==
Schedule of the 2025 NCAA Division I Indoor Track and Field Championships
Date	Category	Time (ET)	Event	Round division
Friday, March 14	Men's Heptathlon	9:30 a.m.	60 meters	Heptathlon men
Friday, March 14	Men's Heptathlon	10:30 a.m.	Long jump	Heptathlon men
Friday, March 14	Men's Heptathlon	11:15 p.m.	Shot put	Heptathlon men
Friday, March 14	Men's Heptathlon	1:15 p.m.	High jump	Heptathlon men
Friday, March 14	Women Pentathlon	9:50 a.m.	60 meters	Pentathlon women
Friday, March 14	Women Pentathlon	11:00 a.m.	High jump	Pentathlon women
Friday, March 14	Women Pentathlon	1:00 p.m.	Shot put	Pentathlon women
Friday, March 14	Women Pentathlon	2:15 p.m.	Long jump	Pentathlon women
Friday, March 14	Women Pentathlon	3:40 p.m.	800 meters	Pentathlon women
Friday, March 14	Field events	2:00 p.m.	Pole vault	Final men
Friday, March 14	Field events	2:45 p.m.	Weight throw	Final men
Friday, March 14	Field events	4:00 p.m.	Long jump	Final men
Friday, March 14	Field events	6:00 p.m.	Pole vault	Final women
Friday, March 14	Field events	6:00 p.m.	Weight throw	Final women
Friday, March 14	Field events	7:00 p.m.	Long jump	Final women
Friday, March 14	Men's track events	4:00 p.m.	Mile	Semifinal men
Friday, March 14	Men's track events	4:18 p.m.	60 meters	Semifinal men
Friday, March 14	Men's track events	4:30 p.m.	400 meters	Semifinal men
Friday, March 14	Men's track events	4:50 p.m.	800 meters	Semifinal men
Friday, March 14	Men's track events	5:05 p.m.	60 meter hurdles	Semifinal men
Friday, March 14	Men's track events	5:20 p.m.	5000 meters	Final men
Friday, March 14	Men's track events	5:40 p.m.	200 meters	Semifinal men
Friday, March 14	Men's track events	6:00 p.m.	Distance medley relay	Final men
Friday, March 14	Women's track events	7:00 p.m.	Mile	Semifinal women
Friday, March 14	Women's track events	7:18 p.m.	60 meters	Semifinal women
Friday, March 14	Women's track events	7:30 p.m.	400 meters	Semifinal women
Friday, March 14	Women's track events	7:50 p.m.	800 meters	Semifinal women
Friday, March 14	Women's track events	8:05 p.m.	60 meter hurdles	Semifinal women
Friday, March 14	Women's track events	8:20 p.m.	5000 meters	Final women
Friday, March 14	Women's track events	8:40 p.m.	200 meters	Semifinal women
Friday, March 14	Women's track events	9:00 p.m.	Distance medley relay	Final women
Saturday, March 15	Men's Heptathlon	10:30 a.m.	60 hurdles	Heptathlon men
Saturday, March 15	Men's Heptathlon	11:30 a.m.	Pole vault	Heptathlon men
Saturday, March 15	Men's Heptathlon	3:30 p.m.	1000 meters	Heptathlon men
Saturday, March 15	Field events	1:00 p.m.	High jump	Final men
Saturday, March 15	Field events	2:45 p.m.	Shot put	Final men
Saturday, March 15	Field events	3:30 p.m.	Triple jump	Final men
Saturday, March 15	Field events	1:00 p.m.	High jump	Final women
Saturday, March 15	Field events	5:45 p.m.	Shot put	Final women
Saturday, March 15	Field events	6:30 p.m.	Triple jump	Final women
Saturday, March 15	Men's track events	4:00 p.m.	Mile	Final men
Saturday, March 15	Men's track events	4:10 p.m.	60 meters	Final men
Saturday, March 15	Men's track events	4:20 p.m.	400 meters	Final men
Saturday, March 15	Men's track events	4:30 p.m.	800 meters	Final men
Saturday, March 15	Men's track events	4:40 p.m.	60 meter hurdles	Final men
Saturday, March 15	Men's track events	4:50 p.m.	200 meters	Final men
Saturday, March 15	Men's track events	5:00 p.m.	3000 meters	Final men
Saturday, March 15	Men's track events	5:20 p.m.	4 × 400 meters relay	Final men
Saturday, March 15	Women's track events	7:00 p.m.	Mile	Final women
Saturday, March 15	Women's track events	7:10 p.m.	60 meters	Final women
Saturday, March 15	Women's track events	7:20 p.m.	400 meters	Final women
Saturday, March 15	Women's track events	7:30 p.m.	800 meters	Final women
Saturday, March 15	Women's track events	7:40 p.m.	60 meter hurdles	Final women
Saturday, March 15	Women's track events	7:50 p.m.	200 meters	Final women
Saturday, March 15	Women's track events	8:00 p.m.	3000 meters	Final women
Saturday, March 15	Women's track events	8:20 p.m.	4 × 400 meters relay	Final women

== Qualification ==
All qualifying performances for the Championships must be attained during the following time periods:

- All events: Friday, November 1, 2024 - Sunday, March 2, 2025

Event	Men's standard	Women's standard	Max entrants	Rounds
60 m	6.57	7.21	16	2
60 m hurdles	7.61	8.10	16	2
200 m	20.66	22.96	16	2
400 m	45.88	51.86	16	2
4x400 m relay	3:05.11	3:30.80	12	1
800 m	1:46.62	2:01.99	16	2
Mile (1609 m)	3:54.12	4:29.49	16	2
3000 m	7:40.38	8:48.96	16	1
DMR 4000 m	9:21.23	10:51.88	12	1
5000 m	13:21.11	15:28.29	16	1
High Jump	2.21 m (7 ft 3 in)	1.85 m (6 ft 3/4 in)	16	1
Pole Vault	5.58 m (18 ft 3 1/2 in)	4.46 m (14 ft 7 1/2 in)	16	1
Long Jump	7.82 m (25 ft 7 3/4 in)	6.49 m (21 ft 3 1/2 in)	16	1
Triple Jump	15.95 m (52 ft 3 3/4 in)	13.37 m (43 ft 10 1/4 in)	16	1
Shot Put	19.38 m (63 ft 6 3/4 in)	17.63 m (57 ft 10 in)	16	1
Weight Throw	22.71 m (74 ft 6 in)	21.75 m (71 ft 4 1/4 in)	16	1
Heptathlon/Pentathlon	5772 points	4183 points	16	1

== See also ==
- National Collegiate Athletic Association (NCAA)
- NCAA Men's Division I Indoor Track and Field Championships
- NCAA Women's Division I Indoor Track and Field Championships
