= Gladys Chepngetich =

Kenyan middle-distance runner

Personal information
- Born: 20 May 2001 (age 25)

Sport
- Sport: Athletics
- Event: Middle-distance running

Achievements and titles
- Personal bests: 800m: 1:59.47 (Jacksonville, 2025); 1500m: 4:13.15 (Atlanta, 2024); Indoor; 400m: 54.18 (Clemson, 2026); 800m: 1:58.81 (Boston, 2026) NR; Mile: 4:37.16 (Boston, 2023)

Gladys Chepngetich (born 20 May 2001) is a Kenyan middle-distance runner. In January 2026, she became the Kenyan indoor national record holder in the 800 metres competing in the United States, and won the 2026 NCAA Indoor Championships title.

== Biography ==
Born in Kapsokio village in Nandi County, Kenya, as the youngest child in a family of eight, Chepngetich attended Kapsokio Primary school and Kosirai Girls High school. She trained with the Janeth Jepkosgei training camp in Kapsabet, and with Townhall Athletics in Iten.

Competing as a student at Clemson University in the United States, by April 2024 her best time of 2:00.53 for the 800 metres had moved her to fifteenth on the NCAA all-time list, whilst a freshman. She was a semi-finalist in the 800 metres at the NCAA Outdoor Championships in June 2024, in Eugene, Oregon.

Competing over 800 metres, she was a finalist at the 2025 NCAA Indoor Championships in Virginia Beach. She ran a personal best of 1:59.47 for the 800m at the NCAA Division I East First Rounds in Jacksonville, Florida in May 2025, and subsequently competed at the NCAA Outdoor Championships in June 2025, reaching the semi-finals. She also ran in the semi-finals of the women's 4 x 400 metres relay at the championships. The following month, she represented Kenya over 800 metres at the 2025 Summer World University Games in Bochum, Germany, again reaching the semi-finals.

Chepngetich ran 1:58.81 for the 800 metres at the BU Terrier Classic in Boston, Massachusetts on 30 January 2026, placing third behind Isabelle Boffey of Great Britain and American champion Roisin Willis. It was the second-fastest indoor time ever by a collegiate woman behind the Athing Mu collegiate record of 1:58.40 from 2021. The time also set a new Kenyan indoor national record for the distance, breaking the previous record set by Pamela Jelimo in winning the World Indoor Championships in 2012. On 14 March, she led gun-to-tape to win the 800 m title at the 2026 NCAA Indoor Championships, winning in 2:00.01.

Chepngetich was named in the Kenyan team for the 2026 World Athletics Indoor Championships in Toruń, Poland, without advancing to the semi-finals of the 800 metres. In May, she was runner-up to Makayla Paige in the 800 m at the ACC Conference final.
