= Bennie Brazell =

American sports player (born 1982)

No. 81
- Position: Wide receiver

Personal information
- Born: June 2, 1982 (age 44); Houston, Texas, U.S.
- Listed height: 6 ft 0 in (1.83 m)
- Listed weight: 182 lb (83 kg)

Career information
- High school: Westbury (Houston)
- College: LSU
- NFL draft: 2006: 7th round, 231st overall pick

Career history
- Cincinnati Bengals (2006–2007); Florida Tuskers (2010)

Awards and highlights
- BCS national champion (2003)

Bennie Brazell (born June 2, 1982) is an American former professional football player who was a wide receiver for the Cincinnati Bengals of the National Football League (NFL). He played college football at LSU Tigers and was selected by the Bengals in the seventh round of the 2006 NFL draft.

In 2011, Brazell became the LSU Tigers track and field sprints and hurdles assistant coach.

== College career ==
Brazell went to college at Louisiana State University where he was a member of the football team as well as the indoor and outdoor track and field teams. At LSU he played on the 2003 football national championship team and he was a 14 time All-American. Brazell was a football and track and field teammate of Xavier Carter while at LSU.

=== Track and field ===
Brazell was a 2004 Olympic Games finalist in the 400 meter hurdles. His career best time was 47.67 seconds, achieved in June 2005 in Sacramento. He was a five-time track and field national champion. He was also the 2002 SEC Male Track & Field Freshman of the Year.

==== Personal bests ====
Event	Time (seconds)	Venue	Date
55 meters	6.56	Fayetteville, Florida	January 20, 2001
100 meters	10.96	Houston, Texas	June 2, 2000
400 meters	49.41	Gainesville, Florida	May 2, 2003
400 metres hurdles	47.67	Sacramento, California	June 11, 2005

== Professional career ==
=== Football ===
2006 LSU Pro Day

Pre-draft measurables
Height	Weight	40-yard dash	20-yard shuttle	Three-cone drill	Vertical jump	Broad jump
6 ft 0 7/8 in (1.85 m)	176 lb (80 kg)	4.43 s	4.21 s	6.80 s	36 in (0.91 m)	10 ft 11 in (3.33 m)
All values from Pro Day

2006 NFL Draft
Brazell was drafted by the Cincinnati Bengals in the seventh round of the 2006 NFL draft with the 231st overall pick.

2006 season
He was on the injured reserve list for the 2006 season.

2007 season
He failed to make the 53 man roster for the 2007 season.

2008 season
In 2008, Brazell tried out for the Jacksonville Jaguars but was not offered a contract.

2010 season
In 2010, Brazell played for the Florida Tuskers of the United Football League (UFL).

=== Rugby ===
In 2010, Brazell was added to the roster of the USA Rugby Sevens squad. His first match was in the tour to Fiji.

== Coaching career ==
In 2011, Brazell became the men's sprints and hurdles assistant coach for the LSU Tigers track and field team.

== Personal ==
Brazell is a former student at Westbury High School in Houston, Texas. His Brother, Floyd Anthony Johns Jr, is an action film American stuntman.
