= Cyril Grayson =

American football player (born 1993)

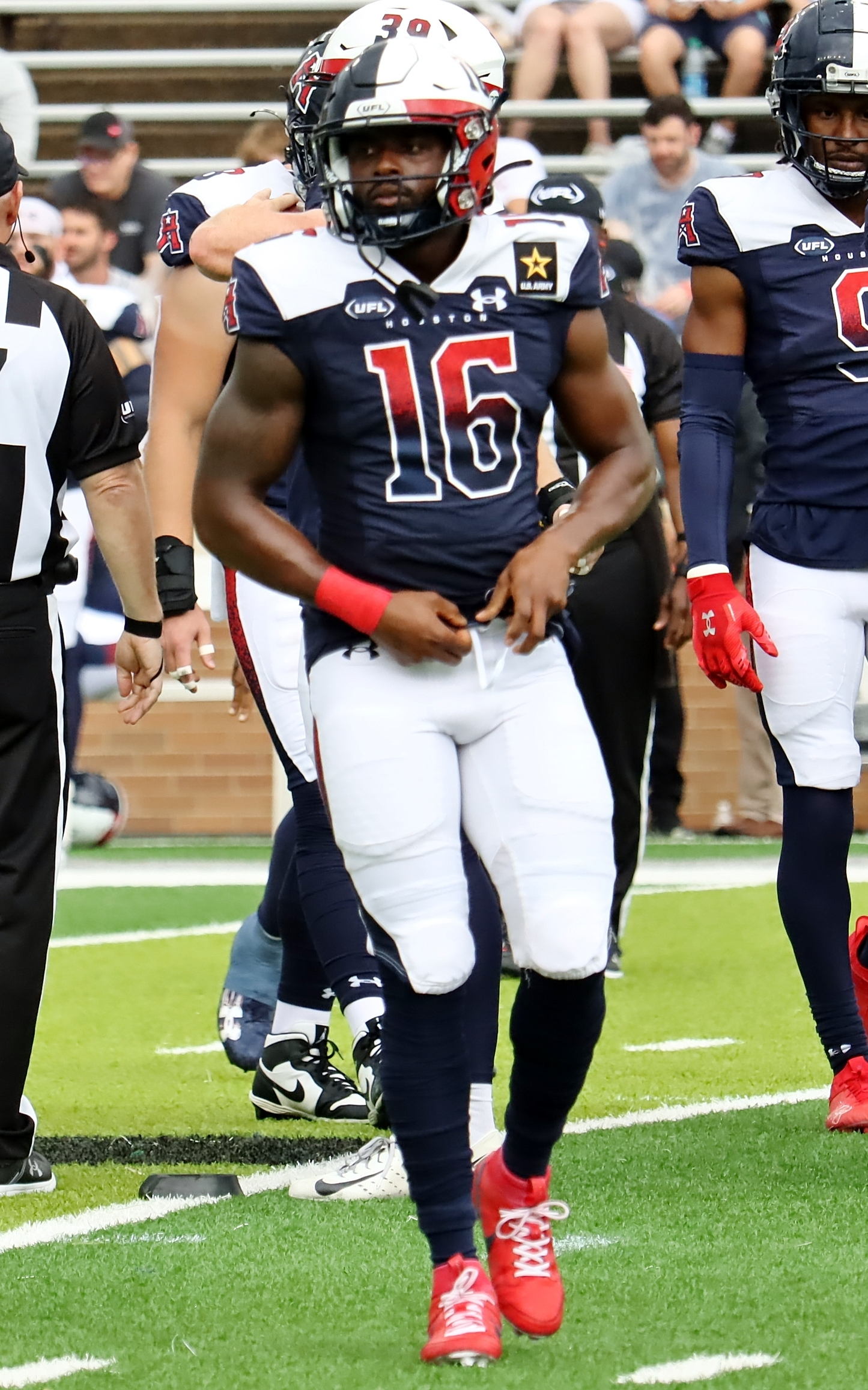
- Grayson with the Houston Roughnecks in 2024

Profile
- Position: Wide receiver

Personal information
- Born: December 5, 1993 (age 32); Kenner, Louisiana, U.S.
- Listed height: 5 ft 9 in (1.75 m)
- Listed weight: 183 lb (83 kg)

Career information
- High school: Archbishop Rummel (Metairie, Louisiana)
- College: LSU (2013–2016)
- NFL draft: 2017: undrafted

Career history
- Seattle Seahawks (2017)*; Indianapolis Colts (2017)*; Seattle Seahawks (2017–2018)*; Houston Texans (2018)*; Chicago Bears (2018–2019)*; New Orleans Saints (2019)*; Dallas Cowboys (2019)*; Tampa Bay Buccaneers (2019–2021); Cleveland Browns (2022)*; Philadelphia Stars (2023); Houston Roughnecks (2024–2025)
- * Offseason or practice squad member only

Awards and highlights
- Super Bowl champion (LV)

Career NFL statistics
- Receptions: 11
- Receiving yards: 215
- Receiving touchdowns: 2
- Stats at Pro Football Reference

Cyril Ross Grayson Jr. (born December 5, 1993) is an American professional football wide receiver. He did not play college football, but was an All-American track sprinter at LSU.

== Early life ==
Grayson has three sisters and two brothers. His parents are a plant worker and a financial advisor. Grayson attended Archbishop Rummel High School.

== College career ==
Grayson attended Louisiana State University (LSU), majoring in kinesiology, where he was an All-American track sprinter. He did not play football in college because the NCAA prohibited athletes who were on scholarship for a minor sport like track from playing major sports; such a rule was created to prevent football teams from circumventing their scholarship limit by allocating extra players to other sports. He gave up his track scholarship in order to undertake football training.

== Professional career ==
=== Seattle Seahawks ===
Grayson tried out for the Canadian Football League in January 2017. After not playing college football, he attended a pro day organized by LSU, and he signed with the Seattle Seahawks as an undrafted free agent on April 10, 2017. Grayson was waived on September 2, and was re-signed to the practice squad the next day, only to be released five days later.

=== Indianapolis Colts ===
On September 19, 2017, Grayson was signed to the Indianapolis Colts' practice squad. He was released by Indianapolis on October 17.

=== Seattle Seahawks (second stint) ===
On December 5, 2017, Grayson was signed to the Seahawks' practice squad. He signed a reserve/future contract with Seattle on January 2, 2018. Grayson was waived by the Seahawks on September 1.

=== Houston Texans ===
On October 1, 2018, Grayson was signed to the Houston Texans' practice squad. He was released by Houston on October 29.

=== Chicago Bears ===
On November 27, 2018, Grayson was signed to the Chicago Bears practice squad. He signed a reserve/future contract with Chicago on January 8, 2019. Grayson was waived by the Bears on May 2.

=== New Orleans Saints ===
On May 13, 2019, Grayson was signed by the New Orleans Saints. He was waived by New Orleans on August 30.

=== Dallas Cowboys ===
On December 11, 2019, Grayson was signed to the Dallas Cowboys' practice squad.

=== Tampa Bay Buccaneers ===
On December 17, 2019, Grayson was signed by the Tampa Bay Buccaneers off the Cowboys' practice squad. He recorded his first professional catch on a three-yard reception against the Atlanta Falcons in Week 17. Grayson was waived by the Buccaneers during final roster cuts on September 5, 2020, and was signed to the practice squad the following day. He was elevated to the active roster on September 12 and 19 for the team's weeks 1 and 2 games against the Saints and Carolina Panthers, and reverted to the practice squad after each game. Grayson was promoted to the active roster on October 6. He was waived on November 3, and re-signed to the practice squad two days later. Grayson was placed on the practice squad/COVID-19 list by the team on November 14, and restored to the practice squad on November 19. He was placed on the practice squad/injured list on December 21, and restored to the practice squad on January 29, 2021. Grayson won his first Super Bowl with the Buccaneers on February 7, defeating the Kansas City Chiefs 31–9, in Super Bowl LV. On February 9, Grayson re-signed with the Buccaneers.

On August 31, 2021, Grayson was waived by the Buccaneers and re-signed to the practice squad the next day. On October 31, Grayson caught his first touchdown pass on a 50-yard pass from Tom Brady against the Saints. On January 2, 2022, Grayson caught six receptions for 81 yards and a game winning touchdown with 15 seconds left against the New York Jets. Grayson filled in for Antonio Brown on the game winning play, who had previously left the game during the third quarter. He was then signed to the active roster on January 8.

On August 25, 2022, Grayson was waived by the Buccaneers.

=== Cleveland Browns ===
On November 7, 2022, Grayson was signed to the Cleveland Browns practice squad. He was waived by Cleveland on November 15.

=== Philadelphia Stars ===
Grayson signed with the Philadelphia Stars of the United States Football League (USFL) on May 29, 2023. The Stars folded when the XFL and USFL merged to create the United Football League (UFL).

=== Houston Roughnecks ===
On January 5, 2024, Grayson was selected by the Houston Roughnecks during the 2024 UFL dispersal draft. He re-signed with the team on October 7.

On May 6, 2025, Grayson re-signed with the Roughnecks.
