= Makayla Paige =

American middle-distance runner

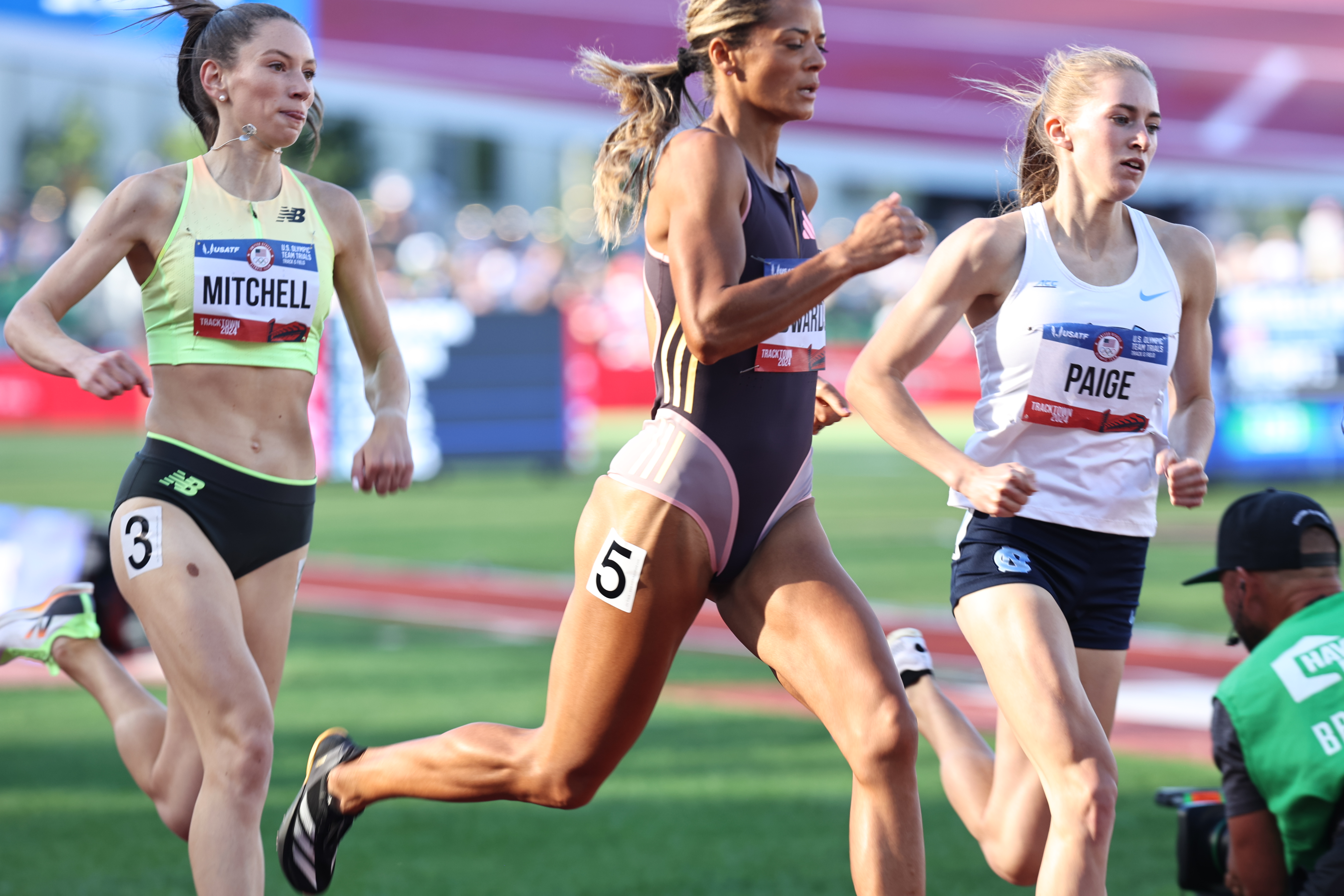
- Paige in 2024

Personal information
- Born: 7 May 2003 (age 23)

Sport
- Sport: Athletics
- Event: Middle-distance running

Achievements and titles
- Personal bests: 800m: 1:58.14 (2026); 1500m: 4:12.03 (2026); Mile: 4:38.31 (2025)

Makayla Paige (born 7 May 2003) is an American middle-distance runner. She won the 800 metres at the 2025 NCAA Indoor Championships.

== Early and personal life ==
From Massachusetts, Paige started in athletics at eight years-old and attended Tewksbury Memorial High School. She had success as a junior athlete, named the Gatorade Massachusetts athlete of the year in 2019 and 2020. Studying at the University of North Carolina at Chapel Hill from 2021, she earned a geological sciences degree before studying for a Master of Applied Professional Studies.

== Career ==
Competing in June 2024 in Eugene, Oregon, Paige finished 14th overall in the 800 metres at the 2024 NCAA outdoor Championships. The following year, Paige won the 800 metres at the 2025 NCAA Indoor Championships. Later that year, she lowered the UNC record in the event for a third time in the season with a third place finish and a sub-two-minute time 1:59.73 at the NCAA regionals in Jacksonville. In June, Paige ran the fifth-fastest time in NCAA history and lowered North Carolina’s program record for the fourth time in a single season by running a time of 1:58.97 to place second to Roisin Willis at the 2025 NCAA Outdoor Championships.

Paige placed third over 800 metres at the 2026 ACC Indoor Championships behind Juliette Whittaker and Gladys Chepngetich. She was a finalist defending her title at the 2026 NCAA Indoor Championships, placing seventh overall. In April, she was part of a North Carolina quartet alongside Sydney Masciarelli, Delea Martins and Vera Sjoberg that ran a new NCAA distance medley relay record in winning the Penn Relays in 10:36.82.

In May, Paige won the 800 meters in a season-best time of 2:00.68 at the ACC Conference final ahead of Clemson's Gladys Chepngetich. Paige was the fastest 800m runner at the NCAA East Regionals in Lexington, Kentucky finishing ahead of Chepngetich in 1:58.98.

Competing at the 2026 NCAA Outdoor Championships, she placed fourth in the 800 metres final with a personal best time of 1:58.30, moving to seventh on the NCAA all-time list. On 11 July, Paige won the 800 metres with a new personal best 1:58.14 at the Sound Running Sunset Tour. Paige was a finalist over 800 metres at the senior 2026 USA Championships in New York in July.
