= Samirah Moody =

American sprinter (born 2002)

Personal information
- Born: 8 November 2002 (age 23)

Sport
- Sport: Athletics
- Event: Sprint

Achievements and titles
- Personal bests: 60m 7.07 (2023); 100m 10.93 (2025); 200m 22.50 (2023)

Samirah Moody (born 8 November 2002) is an American sprinter. She won the 2025 NCAA Outdoor Championships title over 100 metres.

== Early and personal life ==
From a sporting family, her mother, Jamie Moody (née Sims-Bello) ran at Boston University where she held the indoor 55 metres dash record (7.03) and outdoor 100 metres (11.92) record. Her father, Kwesi Moody, was also an athlete, and her brother, Kaleb played on the Harvard University American football team. She was educated at Buckingham Browne & Nichols School in Cambridge, Massachusetts where her track coach was Saleena Rashed, although her initial focus was on basketball. In 2020, In July she won at the New England Track Club Championships, running 11.74 seconds in the 100 metres and running 24.34 metres in the 200 metres. In 2021, she won the 200 metres title at The Outdoor National Championships in a 23.32 seconds and also finished second in the 100 metres with a time of 11.51 seconds, setting all-time New England high school records.

== Career ==
As a freshman at the University of Southern California in 2022, she had a first first-place finish in the 200 metres at the Trojan Invitational finishing in 23.43 seconds. Moody also won first place running in the 4x400 metres relay A squad for USC alongside Bailey Lear.

She qualified for the final of the 2025 NCAA Division I Indoor Track and Field Championships in Virginia Beach, running the 60 metres in a time of 7.17 seconds in her semi-final. She ran the same time in the final to place fifth overall.

In April 2025, she ran the fastest 200 metres time at the Mt. Sac Relays, of 22.58 seconds. Competing at the Big Ten Outdoor in May 2025, Moody won the 100m with a time of 11.13 seconds.

She won the 2025 NCAA Outdoor Championships title over 100 metres ahead of JaMeesia Ford, running a time of 11.14 seconds. She was also part of the winning 4 x 100 metres relay team for alongside Dajaz DeFrand, Madison Whyte and Jassani Carter, as they ran just 0.01 outside the school record to help USC place second overall in the team event at the Championships. She reached the semi-finals of the 100 metres at the 2025 USA Outdoor Track and Field Championships, finishing third in her heat behind Kayla White and Sha'Carri Richardson in 11.11 seconds (+1.3 m/s). The following day she placed fourth in her semi-final but did not proceed as a time qualifier for the final.

In May 2026, she ran at the 2026 World Athletics Relays in the women's 4 × 100 metres relay in Gaborone, Botswana.
