= Dajaz DeFrand =

American athlete (born 2003)

Personal information
- Nationality: American
- Born: 16 October 2003 (age 22)

Sport
- Sport: Athletics
- Event: Sprint

Achievements and titles
- Personal bests: 60m: 7.09 (Virginia Beach, 2025); 100m: 10.94 (Lexington, 2024); 200m: 22.34 (Lexington, 2024)

Dajaz DeFrand (born 16 October 2003) is an American sprinter. She won the 2025 NCAA Indoor Championships title over 60 metres.

== Early life ==
From Lincoln, Nebraska, she attended Lincoln High School and committed to Florida State University in November 2021.

== Career ==
In 2024, she set ACC records in both the women’s 100 metres (10.94) and 200 metres (22.34). In total, she was a five-time ACC champion at Florida State University before transferring to University of Southern California, coached by Karl Goodman.

She won the 60 meters at the Big 10 Indoor Championships on 1 March 2025 in 7.10 seconds. She won the 2025 NCAA Indoor Championships 60 metres title in Virginia Beach, running a time of 7.09 seconds on 15 March 2025.

She finished third in the 200 metres at the 2025 NCAA Division I Outdoor Track and Field Championships in Eugene, Oregon. She also ran in the final of the 100 metres, running a time of 11.23 seconds to place seventh. She was also part of the winning 4 x 100 metres relay team for alongside Samirah Moody, Madison Whyte and Jassani Carter, as they ran just 0.01 outside the school record to help USC place second overall in the team event at the Championships. That summer, she reached the semi-finals of the 100 metres at the 2025 USA Championships, running her heat in 11.16 seconds (+1.3 m/s).

DeFrand opened her 2026 indoor season with a time of 7.16 in the 60 meters at The Spokane Sports Showcase. In March 2026, she was a finalist in both the 60 metres and 200 metres at the 2026 NCAA Indoor Championships in 22.81 seconds. In June, she qualified for the 2026 NCAA Outdoor Championships. In the semi-finals of the 4 x 100 m relay at the championships she was part of the USC team which became the second school in collegiate history to run the under 42 seconds, as DeFrand, Mia Brahe-Pedersen, Madison Whyte and Brianna Selby ran an NCAA-leading time of 41.96 seconds.
