= Mia Brahe-Pedersen =

American athlete

Personal information
- Born: 28 November 2005 (age 20) Mission Viejo, California, U.S.

Sport
- Sport: Athletics

Achievements and titles
- Personal bests: 100 m: 11.00 (Eugene, May 27, 2023); 200 m: 22.43 (Eugene, June 18, 2023)
Medal record
Women's athletics
Representing United States
NACAC U23 Championships
Gold medal – first place	2023 San Jose	100 m
Gold medal – first place	2023 San Jose	200 m
Gold medal – first place	2023 San Jose	4 × 100 m

Mia Brahe-Pedersen (/ˈbrɑːheɪˌpɛdʊrsɛn/ BRAH-hay-PEH-dur-sen; born 28 November 2005) is an American track and field athlete from Oregon who competes as a sprinter.

== Early life ==
Brahe-Pedersen was born in Mission Viejo, California to Christian Brahe-Pedersen and Pam Cosper. She moved to Lake Oswego, Oregon, in 2008. In 2024, she graduated from Lake Oswego High School where she was coached by John Parks and his sprints assistant, the 2012 Olympian Ryan Bailey. She has been a member of the Inner Circle Track Club (formerly Step Ur Game Up), coached by Hashim Hall since 2018, when she started track.

== Career ==
In 2022, she represented the United States at the World Athletics U20 Championships in Cali, Colombia. In the semi-finals of the 200 m, she set a new personal best time of 22.95s, which also equaled the Oregon state record from 1968, set by Margaret Bailes. She finished seventh in the 100 m final and fourth in the 200 m final.

Brahe-Pedersen recorded the all-time best high school 200 m indoor time of 22.89 s at the New Mexico Don Kirby Invitational in February 2023, beating the time of Bianca Knight from 2007. She won the 2023 Indoor National High School Championships titles over 60 m and 200 m in March 2023. She broke Olympic gold medalist Chandra Cheeseborough's high school 100-yard record at the Oregon Relays in the spring of 2023.

She won the 100 m, 200 m and was part of the winning 4 × 100 m relay at the Outdoor National High School Championships. She ran 11.00 for the 100 m, placing her fourth on the high school all-time list behind Shawnti Jackson, Briana Williams and Candace Hill. Her time of 22.43 s to win the 200 m was the second-fastest outdoor time in high school history (behind Allyson Felix from 2003).

One of only a handful of high school athletes competing at the 2023 USA Outdoor Track and Field Championships, Brahe-Pedersen ran a new personal best time of 11.05s in the heats to reach the semi-finals of the 100 m. There she ran 11.09 to qualify for the final in which she ran 11.08 to finish seventh. In the 200 metres, she ran a new personal best time of 22.58s to reach the final. A few weeks later Brahe-Pedersen at the NACAC U23 Championships resulted in gold medals in the 100 m, 200 m, and 4 × 100 m relay. That year, she signed a Name, Image and Likeness (NIL) deal with Nike and committed to the University of Southern California.

After injury interrupted her progress for two years, Brahe-Pedersen ran a new indoor personal best competing for USC at the New Mexico Collegiate Classic in February 2026, with a time of 22.85 for the 200 metres, later converted to 22.92 due to altitude. Competing at the Mt. SAC Relays in California on 18 April 2026 she was part of a USC team which set a school record of 42.12 seconds in the women's 4 x 100 m relay, running alongside Madison Whyte, Christine Mallard and Brianna Selby. In June, she qualified for the 2026 NCAA Outdoor Championships. In the semi-finals of the 4 x 100 m relay at the championships she was part of the USC team which became the second school in collegiate history to run the under 42 seconds, as Brahe-Pedersen, Dajaz DeFrand, Madison Whyte and Brianna Selby ran an NCAA-leading time of 41.96 seconds. On 11 July, she was runner-up in the 100 metres behind Shawnti Jackson at the Sound Running Sunset Tour.

== Personal life ==
Brahe-Pedersen made headlines when she beat her prom date, running 11.08s in the mixed-gender 100 m at the Secure Storage Summit Invitational in Bend, Oregon on May 6, 2023.

== Sponsorship ==
In July 2023, Brahe-Pedersen signed an endorsement agreement with sportswear brand Nike. In doing so, she became the first high school track and field athlete to have a name, image, and likeness (NIL) agreement with the company.
