= LSU Tigers track and field =

- Founded: 1897
- University: Louisiana State University
- Head coach: Dennis Shaver (20th season)
- Conference: SEC
- Location: Baton Rouge, Louisiana, US
- Indoor track: Carl Maddox Field House (Capacity: 3,000)
- Outdoor track: Bernie Moore Track Stadium (Capacity: 5,680)
- Nickname: Tigers
- Colors: Purple and gold

Conference Indoor Championships
- 1957, 1963, 1989, 1990

Conference Outdoor Championships
- 1933, 1934, 1935, 1936, 1938, 1939, 1940, 1941, 1942, 1943, 1946, 1947, 1948, 1951, 1957, 1958, 1959, 1960, 1963, 1988, 1989, 1990, 2019

Men Indoor National Championships
- 2001, 2004

Men Outdoor National Championships
- 1933, 1989, 1990, 2002, 2021

The LSU Tigers track and field team represents Louisiana State University in NCAA Division I men's indoor and outdoor track and field.

== History ==
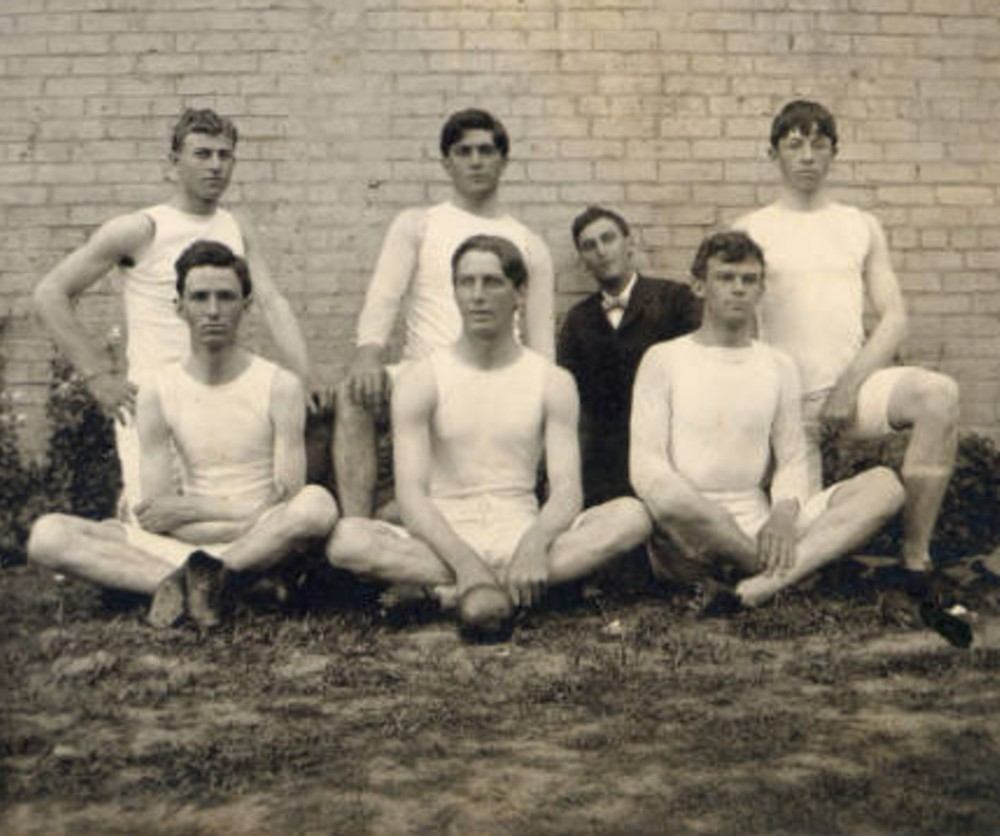
1897 LSU track & field team

LSU men's track and field began in 1897. The Tigers have won a total of six NCAA championships (two indoor, four outdoor).

In the early history of the program, the team won six Southern Intercollegiate Athletic Association titles between 1913 and 1922. During its short period of membership in the Southern Intercollegiate Conference (now known as the Southern Conference), the team also won three consecutive conference titles.

In 1933, the school joined the Southeastern Conference and the track & field team wasted no time making a name for itself, winning the inaugural SEC track & field title as well as the NCAA Men's Outdoor Track and Field Championship, the first NCAA championship in any sport for LSU. LSU men's track & field program won back-to-back NCAA outdoor titles in 1989 and 1990, and they won their 4th outdoor title in 2002. They won a fifth outdoor championship in 2021.

The Tigers won their first indoor NCAA title in 2001, and their second in 2004.

== Team finishes ==
Year	SEC indoor	NCAA indoor	SEC outdoor	NCAA outdoor
1933	*	*	1st	**1st**
1934	*	*	1st	3rd
1935	*	*	1st	7th(t)
1936	*	*	1st	dnc
1937	*	*	2nd	dnc
1938	*	*	1st	dnc
1939	*	*	1st	17th(t)
1940	*	*	1st	5th
1941	*	*	1st	5th
1942	*	*	1st	20th(t)
1943	*	*	1st	dnc
1944	*	*	2nd	dnc
1945	*	*	2nd	19th
1946	*	*	1st	15th
1947	*	*	1st	dnc
1948	*	*	1st	52nd(t)
1949	*	*	2nd	dnc
1950	*	*	2nd	dnc
1951	*	*	1st	dnc
1952	*	*	5th	17th(t)
1953	*	*	6th	dnc
1954	*	*	2nd	dnc
1955	*	*	5th	dnc
1956	*	*	3rd	dnc
1957	1st	*	1st	dnc
1958	dnc	*	1st	dnc
1959	dnc	*	1st	dnc
1960	dnc	*	1st	dnc
1961	5th	*	2nd	dnc
1962	dnc	*	2nd	41st(t)
1963	1st	*	1st	dnc
1964	3rd	*	3rd	18th(t)
1965	2nd	13th(t)	3rd	53rd
1966	3rd	dnc	3rd	39th(t)
1967	4th	dnc	3rd	19th(t)
1968	7th	dnc	5th	dnc
1969	3rd	dnc	3rd	dnc
1970	5th	dnc	2nd	dnc
1971	4th	dnc	4th	dnc
1972	4th	dnc	3rd	dnc
1973	5th	dnc	3rd	dnc
1974	4th	43rd(t)	3rd	21st(t)
1975	2nd	21st(t)	3rd	21st(t)
1976	6th	14th(t)	8th	dnc
1977	8th	dnc	7th	dnc
1978	4th	32rd(t)	6th	dnc
1979	4th	dnc	4th	8th(t)
1980	2nd	11th	4th	13th(t)
1981	3rd	dnc	5th	16th
1982	6th	31st(t)	6th	40th(t)
1983	8th	dnc	8th	dnc
1984	3rd	39th(t)	7th	dnc
1985	4th	dnc	4th	50th(t)
1986	2nd	13th(t)	2nd	13th
1987	4th	11th	3rd	5th
1988	2nd	4th	1st	5th(t)
1989	1st	6th(t)	1st	**1st**
1990	1st	5th(t)	1st	**1st**
1991	2nd	39th(t)	2nd	6th
1992	4th	5th(t)	3rd	7th
1993	3rd	12th	2nd	2nd
1994	4th	53rd(t)	3rd	6th(t)
1995	4th	14th(t)	3rd	3rd
1996	6th	9th(t)	3rd	7th
1997	5th	10th(t)	3rd	27th(t)
1998	2nd	19th(t)	2nd	4th(t)
1999	6th	7th(t)	5th	9th(t)
2000	2nd	7th(t)	2nd	5th
2001	2nd	**1st**	6th	5th
2002	4th	3rd	4th	**1st**
2003	6th	3rd	6th	4th
2004	4th	**1st**	5th	3rd
2005	6th	20th(t)	5th	3rd
2006	4th	2nd	4th	2nd
2007	4th	10th(t)	2nd	2nd
2008	2nd	4th	2nd	2nd(t)
2009	6th	4th	3rd	5th
2010	3rd	4th	2nd	6th
2011	3rd	4th	4th	4th
2012	4th	5th	2nd	2nd
2013	5th	15th	4th	7th
2014	10th	8th(t)	6th	4th(t)
2015	5th	7th	4th	4th
2016	5th(t)	4th	4th	5th
2017	8th	18th(t)	7th	7th(t)
2018	11th	26th	8th	8th
2019	3rd	3rd	1st	7th
2020	2nd	N/A	N/A	N/A
2021	2nd	2nd	3rd	**1st**
2022	8th	24th	7th	6th
2023	8th	48th	2nd	4th
2024	8th	53rd(t)	5th	16th

- **Bold** indicates NCAA national championship.

== NCAA championships ==
=== Event ===
==== Indoor ====
Year	Event	Athlete(s)
1965	600 yards	Leland Albright
1976	60 hurdles	Allen Misher
1987	1,000 meters	Robin van Helden
1992	High jump	Tom Lange
2000	Pole vault	Russ Buller
2001	4x400 relay	Lueroy Colquhoun, Alleyne Francique, Robert Parham, Pedro Tunon
2001	Triple jump	Walter Davis
2002	Triple jump	Walter Davis
2002	400 meters	Alleyne Francique
2003	4x400 relay	Bennie Brazell, Pete Coley, Marlon Greensword, Kelly Willie
2004	Long jump	John Moffitt
2004	Triple jump	LeJuan Simon
2006	4x400 relay	Xavier Carter, Reginald Dardar, Melville Rogers, Kelly Willie
2006	400 meters	Xavier Carter
2008	60 meters	Richard Thompson
2010	Weight throw	Walter Henning
2011	Weight throw	Walter Henning
2013	Long jump	Damar Forbes
2014	4x400 relay	Darrell Bush, Quincy Downing, Cyril Grayson, Vernon Norwood
2015	400 meters	Vernon Norwood
2016	4x400 relay	LaMar Bruton, Michael Cherry, Fitzroy Dunkley, Cyril Grayson
2017	Weight throw	Johnnie Jackson
2019	Pole vault	Armand Duplantis
2019	Long jump	Rayvon Grey
2021	High jump	JuVaughn Harrison
2021	Long jump	JuVaughn Harrison
2021	400 meters	Noah Williams
2021	60 hurdles	Damion Thomas

==== Outdoor ====
Year	Event	Athlete(s)
1933	Pole vault	Matt Gordy
1933	440 yards	Glenn Hardin
1933	220 hurdles	Glenn Hardin
1933	Shot put	Jack Torrance
1934	440 yards	Glenn Hardin
1934	220 hurdles	Glenn Hardin
1934	Shot put	Jack Torrance
1941	Long jump	Billy Brown
1964	400 hurdles	Billy Hardin
1967	Javelin	Delmon McNabb
1975	120 hurdles	Larry Shipp
1979	4x400 relay	Efrem Coley, Greg Hill, Pearson Jordan, ReVey Scott
1987	110 hurdles	Eric Reid
1988	Decathlon	Mikael Olander
1989	Discus	John Nichols
1990	Long jump	Llewellyn Starks
1992	10,000 meters	Terry Thornton
1992	Shot put	Simon Williams
1992	4x100 relay	Reggie Jones, Chris King, Jason Sanders, Bryant Williams
1993	4x100 relay	Reggie Jones, Glenroy Gilbert, Chris King, Fabian Muyaba
1994	4x100 relay	Eddie Kennison, Fabian Muyaba, Derrick Thymes, Bryant Williams
1995	Decathlon	Mario Sategna
1996	200 meters	Rohsaan Griffin
1998	200 meters	Curtis Perry
1999	Triple jump	LeVar Anderson
2000	Pole vault	Russ Buller
2001	Triple jump	Walter Davis
2002	4x100 relay	Bennie Brazell, Pete Coley, Walter Davis, Robert Parham
2002	Decathlon	Claston Bernard
2002	Long jump	Walter Davis
2002	Triple jump	Walter Davis
2003	4x100 relay	Bennie Brazell, Pete Coley, Robert Parham, Kelly Willie
2003	4x400 relay	Bennie Brazell, Pete Coley, Robert Parham, Kelly Willie
2004	Long jump	John Moffitt
2005	4x400 relay	Bennie Brazell, Xavier Carter, Reginald Dardar, Kelly Willie
2006	4x400 relay	Xavier Carter, Reginald Dardar, Melville Rogers, Kelly Willie
2006	4x100 relay	Xavier Carter, Marvin Stevenson, Richard Thompson, Kelly Willie
2006	100 meters	Xavier Carter
2006	400 meters	Xavier Carter
2007	400 hurdles	Isa Phillips
2008	4x100 relay	Armanti Hayes, Trindon Holliday, Gabriel Mvumvure, Richard Thompson
2008	100 meters	Richard Thompson
2009	100 meters	Trindon Holliday
2010	Hammer throw	Walter Henning
2011	110 hurdles	Barrett Nugent
2012	4x100 relay	Shermund Allsop, Aaron Ernest, Barrett Nugent, Keyth Talley
2013	Long jump	Damar Forbes
2015	400 meters	Vernon Norwood
2015	4x400 relay	Quincy Downing, Fitzroy Dunkley, Cyril Grayson, Vernon Norwood
2016	4x100 relay	Jaron Flournoy, Renard Howell, Tremayne Acy, Nethaneel Mitchell-Blake
2016	4x400 relay	Lamar Bruton, Michael Cherry, Cyril Grayson, Fitzroy Dunkley
2019	High jump	JuVaughn Harrison
2019	Long jump	JuVaughn Harrison
2021	Javelin	Tzuriel Pedigo
2021	100 meters	Terrance Laird
2021	High jump	JuVaughn Harrison
2021	Long jump	JuVaughn Harrison
2021	400 hurdles	Sean Burrell
2021	4x100 relay	Dylan Peebles, Noah Williams, Akanni Hislop, Terrance Laird
2022	400 hurdles	Sean Burrell
2023	Javelin	Tzuriel Pedigo
2023	4x100 relay	Brandon Hicklin, Dorian Camel, Da’Marcus Fleming, Godson Oghenebrume

== Stadiums ==
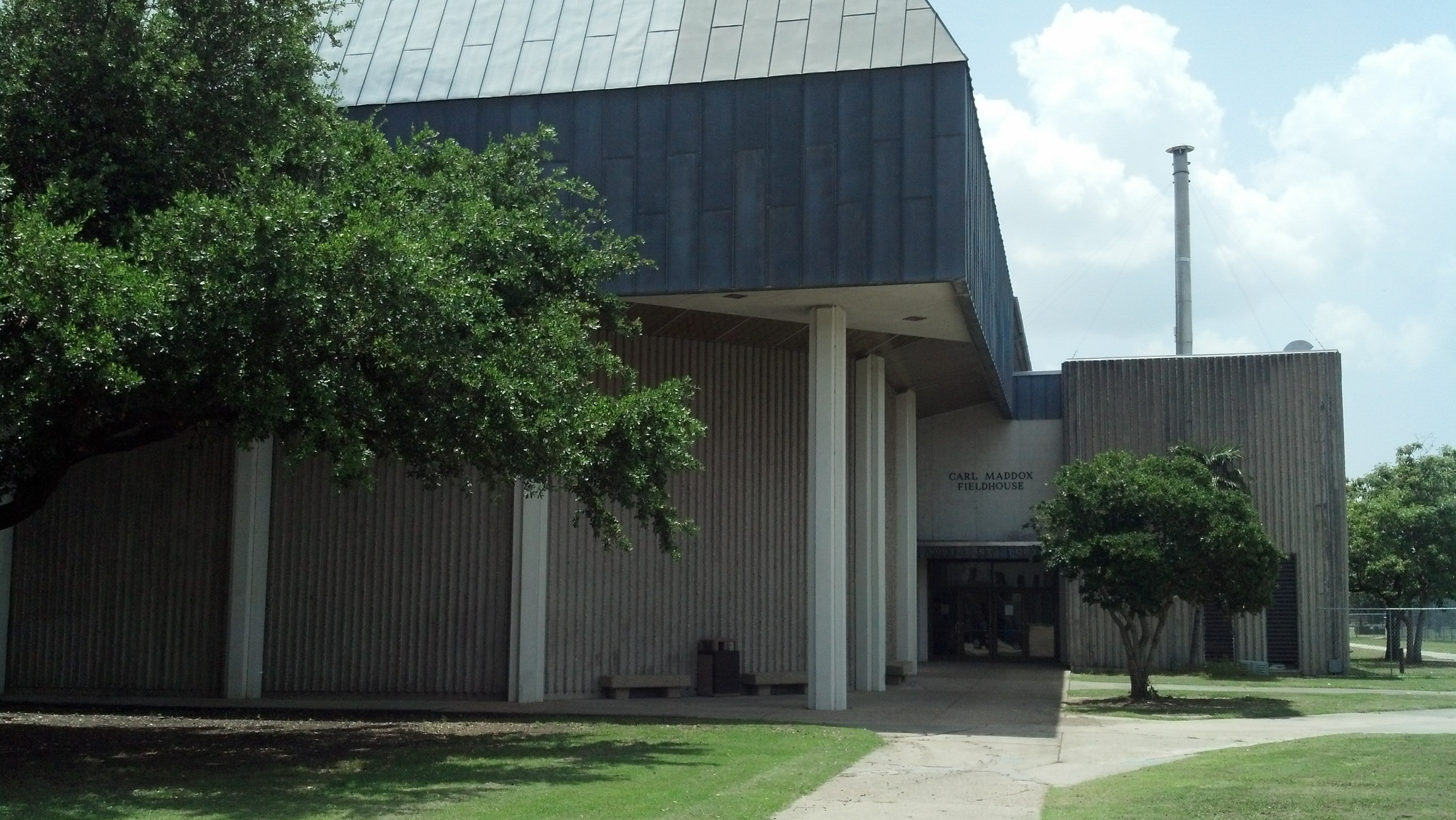
Carl Maddox Field House

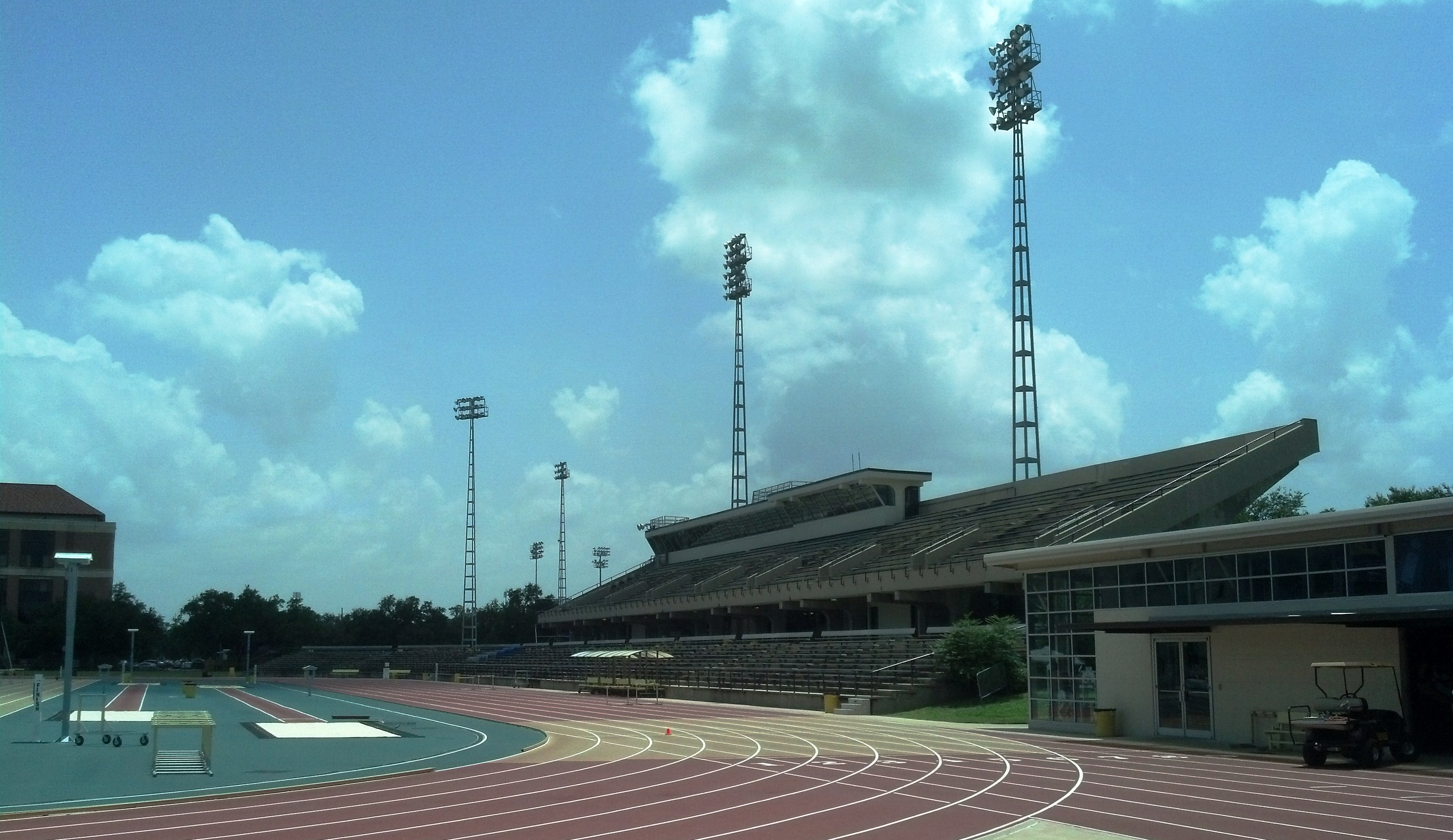
Bernie Moore Track Stadium

=== Carl Maddox Field House ===
Carl Maddox Field House, built in 1975, is the indoor track and field home arena for the LSU Tigers and LSU Lady Tigers track and field teams. The arena has a seating capacity of 3,000. The field house features a 200-meter unbanked track, elevated jump runways, a variety of throwing areas, and multiple high jump and vaulting areas. In 1998, the arena was renamed in honor of former LSU Athletic Director Carl Maddox.

=== Bernie Moore Track Stadium ===
Bernie Moore Track Stadium, built in 1969, is the outdoor track and field home stadium for the LSU Tigers and LSU Lady Tigers track and field teams. The stadium has a seating capacity of 5,680. In 1971, the stadium was renamed after former LSU football and track & field coach, Bernie Moore. Moore coached the LSU track and field teams for 18 years (1930–47) and led the Tigers to their first NCAA National Championship in 1933 as well as to 12 SEC crowns.

== Training facilities ==
=== Bernie Moore Track Stadium weight room ===
Opened in January 2003, the weight room is for the LSU Tigers track and field and LSU Lady Tigers track and field teams. The weight room is a 2,000 square foot facility designed for an Olympic style lifting program. Located adjacent to the track, the weight room features 10 multi-purpose power stations, five dumbbell stations, four power racks, five sets of competition plates, 10 competition Olympic bars, two multi-purpose racks, an assortment of selectorized machines, and two televisions for multimedia presentations.

== Head coaches ==
Years	Coach
1905–06	Dan A. Killian
1907–09	Edgar Wingard
1910–11	John W. Mayhew
1912	F.M. Long
1913–15	F. C. Beckler
1916–27	Tad Gormley
1928	F. C. Frey
1929	Ridge Edwards
1930–47	Bernie Moore
1948	Jules Roux
1949–63	Al Moreau
1964–76	Joe May
1977–81	Bill McClure
1982	Murrell "Boots" Garland
1983–86	Billy Maxwell
1987	Sam Seemes
1988–2004	Pat Henry
2005–present	Dennis Shaver
