= Kelly Ufodiama =

Nigerian-American track and field athlete

Personal information
- Full name: Kelly Ufodiama
- Nationality: Nigeria; United States
- Born: 9 June 2006 (age 20)
- Education: East Carolina University
- Height: 5 ft 8 in (173 cm)

Sport
- Sport: Athletics Sprint
- Event: 100 m 200 meters

Achievements and titles
- Personal bests: 60M: 7.14 (Louisville, 2026); 100M: 11.40 (Gainesville, 2026); 200M: 22.53 (Gainesville, 2026)

Kelly Ufodiama (born 9 June 2006) is a Nigerian-American track and field athlete. She now represents Nigeria after switching allegiance and became eligible to represent the country on 15 May 2025 before reverting to the USA.

== Education ==
Ufodiama was born in the United States and is from Round Rock, Texas. She attended Cedar Ridge High School before moving to East Carolina University, where she competes in athletics.

== Career ==
During the 2024–2025 season, she competed in six meets, winning four. She also won the American Athletic Conference Championships in the 60m and 200m. In 2025, she earned several honors, including American Athletic Conference Indoor Track Most Valuable Performer, Freshman of the Year, and Most Outstanding Performance. Ufodiama also broke program records in the 60m and 200m.

She became the first athlete in American Athletic Conference history to sweep the short sprint series (60m, 100m, and 200m) twice. This earned her a trip to the NCAA Outdoor Championships in both the 100m and 200m, where she finished 22nd and 11th, respectively.

In 2026, Ufodiama earned Second-Team All-America honors in two events, placing 15th in the 60m and 12th in the 200m. She went on to win the 100m and 200m at the American Athletic Conference Championships in Birmingham.

After completing her transfer of allegiance from the United States to Nigeria, she is now eligible to represent Nigeria in international competition. In April 2026, she ran a wind-aided 100m personal best of 11.25 (+2.1) at the Aggie Invitational. As of today, Ufodiama has reverted to her USA nationality.
