= Terrance Laird =

American track and field athlete (born 2000)

Personal information
- Born: October 12, 1998 (age 27) West Chester, Pennsylvania, U.S.

Sport
- Country: United States
- Sport: Track and field
- Event: Sprints
- College team: LSU Tigers (2020–2021); Hinds CC Eagles (2019); PSU Nittany Lions (2018)
- Coached by: Dennis Shaver

Achievements and titles
- Personal bests: 100 m: 10.05 (2021); 200 m: 19.81 (2021)

Terrance Laird (born October 12, 1998) is an American track and field athlete specializing in the 100 meters and 200 meters sprints.

== Career ==
Laird's freshman year was at Penn State in 2017-18, where he won the Men's Freshman of the Year award in the Big Ten conference. He struggled academically at Penn State and transferred to Hinds Community College in Mississippi for his sophomore year.

Laird moved on to Louisiana State University where he competed collegiately for the LSU Tigers. On 27 March 2021, Laird ran a 19.81 200 metres at the Texas Relays meet, which was the third fastest time in NCAA history. His performance was even more impressive due to his negative split, running the first 100m in 10.39 seconds and his final in 9.42 seconds, which is one of the fastest closes for the 200 metres in history. He also finished second to Matthew Boling at the 2021 NCAA Division I Indoor Track and Field Championships in the 200m, finishing in 20.20 seconds. This was also the 8th fastest all time indoor 200 metres. Terrance Laird also holds the 4th fastest wind aided 200m run of all time, running 19.64 (+5.6) on May 17, 2019. On May 15, 2021, Laird had a similar achievement running 9.80 +3.2 for 100 meters, one of the top 20 performers under any circumstances in that event. He was awarded the Commissioners Trophy for the most points at the SEC event, where he won the 100 and 200 meters and anchored the winning 4x100 meter relay team.

== Personal bests ==
Event	Time	Wind (m/s)	Venue	Date	Notes
100 m	10.05	+0.4	Eugene, Oregon, US	June 11, 2021	
100 m	9.80 w	+3.2	College Station, Texas, US	May 15, 2021	Wind-assisted
200 m	19.81	+0.8	Austin, Texas, US	March 27, 2021	
200 m	19.64 w	+5.6	Hobbs, New Mexico, US	May 17, 2019	Wind-assisted
Indoor 200 m	20.20	—N/a	Fayetteville, Arkansas, US	March 13, 2021	#8 all-time

- Information from World Athletics profile.

== National championship results ==
Representing the PSU Nittany Lions (2018), Hinds CC Eagles (2019), LSU Tigers (2021 NCAA), and adidas (2021)
Year	Competition	Position	Event	Time	Wind (m/s)	Venue	Notes
2018	NCAA Division I Indoor Championships	12th	200 m	20.97	—N/a	College Station, Texas	
2019	NJCAA Division I Championships	2nd (semis)	200 m	19.64 w	+5.6	Hobbs, New Mexico	Wind-assisted, Q (Note: Qualified for the final, but did not start (DNS).)
2019	NJCAA Division I Championships	2nd	4×100 m relay	39.24	—N/a	Hobbs, New Mexico	
2019	NJCAA Division I Championships	2nd	100 m	10.14 w	+2.3	Hobbs, New Mexico	Wind-assisted
2021	NCAA Division I Indoor Championships	2nd	200 m	20.20	—N/a	Fayetteville, Arkansas	PB, #8 all-time
2021	NCAA Division I Championships	1st	4×100 m relay	38.48	—N/a	Eugene, Oregon	
2021	NCAA Division I Championships	1st	100 m	10.05	+0.4	Eugene, Oregon	PB
2021	NCAA Division I Championships	2nd	200 m	19.94	-0.4	Eugene, Oregon	
2021	US Olympic Trials	6th	200 m	20.15	+0.3	Eugene, Oregon	

- NCAA and NJCAA results from Track & Field Results Reporting System profile.
