= Brianna Selby =

American sprinter (born 2006)

Personal information
- Nationality: American
- Born: 3 January 2006 (age 20)

Sport
- Sport: Track and field
- Event: Sprint
- College team: USC Trojans

Achievements and titles
- Personal bests: 60m 7.15 (2026); 100m 10.83 (2026)

Brianna Selby (born 3 January 2006) is an American sprinter.

== Early life ==
Selby attended Indian River High School in Chesapeake, Virginia and signed a letter of intent to compete for the University of Southern California in late 2023.

== Career ==
In 2023, Selby became national age-group champion over 60 metres at the New Balance Nationals Indoor Championships, where she ran times of 7.27 seconds, 7.28 s and 7.30 s in succession. Selby competed in 2024 as a member of Speed Evolutions Athletics Club. In March 2024, she ran 7.19 seconds to win the 60 metres title at the New Balance National Indoor Championships. That year, she signed a Name, Image and Likeness (NIL) contract with New Balance.

Competing for the University of Southern California, Selby lowered her personal best to 11.03 seconds in 2025. in June, she ran a new personal best and world under-20 lead of 11.01 seconds in the semi-finals at the 2025 NCAA Outdoor Championships in Eugene, Oregon, prior to placing eighth overall in the final. She reached the semi-finals of the 100 metres at the 2025 USA Outdoor Track and Field Championships, running her heat in 11.34 seconds (-1.5 m/s).

In February 2026, Selby ran a new personal best of 7.15 seconds for the 60 m at the New Mexico Collegiate Classic in Albuquerque, New Mexico. Later that month, she won the 60 m in 7.24 seconds at the Big Ten Indoor Championships. Competing at the 2026 NCAA Indoor Championships she qualified for the final of the 60 metres with a run of 7.21 seconds, placing eighth overall.

Competing at the Mt. SAC Relays in California on 18 April 2026 she was part of a USC team which set a school record of 42.12 seconds in the women's 4 x 100 m relay, running alongside Madison Whyte, Christine Mallard and Mia Brahe-Pedersen. In May, she ran the seventh-fastest time in collegiate history with 10.83 seconds to win the 100 m at the NCAA Regionals. In the semi-finals of the 4 x 100 m relay at the 2026 NCAA Outdoor Championships, she was part of the USC team which became the second school in collegiate history to run the under 42 seconds, as Selby, Dajaz DeFrand, Mia Brahe-Pedersen and Madison Whyte ran an NCAA-leading time of 41.96 seconds.

== Athletics achievements ==
Information from her World Athletics profile unless otherwise noted.

=== Personal bests ===
Type	Distance	Time (s)	Wind (m/s)	Venue	Date	Notes
Individual events
Indoor	60 metres	7.15	—N/a	Albuquerque, United States	7 February 2026	
Indoor	200 metres sh	25.07	—N/a	Virginia Beach, United States	14 January 2022	
Outdoor	100 metres	10.83	+1.5	Fayetteville, United States	30 May 2026	
Outdoor	200 metres	23.06	-1.1	Los Angeles, United States	3 May 2026	
Team events
Outdoor	4 × 100 metres relay	41.58	—N/a	Eugene, United States	13 June 2026	

=== National championships and competitions ===
Year	Competition	Venue	Position	Event	Time	Notes
2025	NCAA Division I Championships	Eugene, Oregon	8th	100 m	11.25	
2025	USA Championships	Eugene, Oregon	21st (sf)	100 m	11.50	
2026	NCAA Division I Indoor Championships	Fayetteville, Arkansas	8th	60 m	7.26	
2026	NCAA Division I Championships	Eugene, Oregon	8th	100 m	11.14	
2026	NCAA Division I Championships	Eugene, Oregon	1st	4 × 100 m relay	41.58	CL
