= Madison Whyte =

American athlete (born 2004)

Personal information
- Nationality: American
- Born: October 17, 2004 (age 21)

Sport
- Sport: Track and field
- Event: Sprint

Achievements and titles
- Personal bests: 200m: 22.16 (2025); 400m: 48.97 (2026)
Medal record
Women's athletics
Representing United States
World U20 Championships
Gold medal – first place	2022 Cali	Mixed 4x100 m
Gold medal – first place	2022 Cali	4x400 m relay
Pan American U20 Championships
Gold medal – first place	2023 Mayagüez	Mixed 4x400 m
Gold medal – first place	2023 Mayagüez	4x400 m relay

Madison Whyte (born October 17, 2004) is an American sprinter. She won gold medals at the 2022 World Junior Championships and 2023 Pan American U20 Championships. She was a finalist over 200 metres at the 2025 USA Championships.

== Biography ==
From Virginia, Whyte attended Heritage High School in Newport News. As a high school track performer she won multiple individual state titles and became the first female to rank in the state's top three all-time in the 100 metres, 200 metres and 400 metres. She ran high school outdoor personal bests of 11.63 in the 100m, 23.30 in the 200m, and 54.35 in the 400m before agreeing to join the University of Southern California in 2022.

Whyte contributed to gold medal winning American teams in the mixed 4 × 400 m relay and women's 4 × 400 m relay at the 2022 World Athletics U20 Championships in Cali, Colombia, with the mixed team of Whyte, Kennedy Wade, Will Sumner and Charlie Bartholomew setting a under-20 record time of 3:17.69.

Whyte was a gold medalist in the mixed 4 × 400 m relay at the 2023 Pan American U20 Athletics Championships in Mayagüez, Puerto Rico in August 2023 alongside JaMeesia Ford, amongst others. She also won the gold medal in the women's 4 × 400 m relay at the championships.

Whyte was a finalist in the 200 metres at the 2025 NCAA Division I Indoor Track and Field Championships. In April, Whyte ran a personal best 22.32 seconds for the 200 metres at the Texas A&M 44 Farms Team Invitational. The following month, she won a sweep of titles with victories over 200m, 400m and in the 4x400m relay at the Big Ten Championships, and lowered her personal best to 22.16 seconds at the NCAA Division I West First Rounds. Whyte was part of the winning 4 x 100 metres relay team for University of Southern California at the 2025 NCAA Division I Outdoor Track and Field Championships alongside Samirah Moody, Dajaz DeFrand and Jassani Carter, as they ran just 0.01 outside the school record. She also placed runner-up to JaMessia Ford in the 200 metres at the Championships to help USC place second overall. That year, Whyte ran 22.55 seconds to qualify for the final of the 200m at the 2025 USA Outdoor Track and Field Championships, getting the last spot ahead of Sha'Carri Richardson, before placing sixth overall in the final in 22.56 seconds.

Whyte ran a personal best for the 400 metres of 50.82 seconds for the 400 metres in Albuquerque in February 2026. She qualified for the 2026 NCAA Division I Indoor Track and Field Championships, having run a meet record 51.31 seconds to win the 400 meters at the Big Ten Indoor Championships in Indianapolis in February 2026. On 14 March, she ran a personal best 50.68 seconds to finish runner-up to Dejanea Oakley in the 400 m final at the 2026 NCAA Indoor Championships.

On 18 April, Whyte ran the ninth-fastest collegiate 400 m time in history with 49.64 seconds at the Mt. SAC Relays in California. She also helped USC post a school record with 42.12 seconds in the women's 4 x 100 m relay at the meeting, running alongside Mia Brahe-Pedersen, Christine Mallard and Brianna Selby. In the semi-finals of the 4 x 100 m relay at the 2026 NCAA Outdoor Championships, she was part of the USC team which became the second school in collegiate history to run the under 42 seconds, as Whyte, Dajaz DeFrand, Mia Brahe-Pedersen and Brianna Selby ran an NCAA-leading time of 41.96 seconds. The quartet subsequently also won the final. In the 400 metres final she placed second to Oakley and ran a personal best 48.97 seconds, moving to fourth on the US all-time list behind Sydney McLaughlin-Levrone, Sanya Richards-Ross and Valerie Brisco-Hooks.
