= Jassani Carter =

American sprinter (born 2003)

Personal information
- Born: 4 November 2003 (age 22) Hollywood, Fl

Sport
- Sport: Athletics
- Event: Sprint

Achievements and titles
- Personal bests: 60m: 7.22 (2026); 100m: 10.88 (2026); 200m: 22.46 (2024)

Jassani Carter (born 4 November 2003) is an American sprinter.

== Biography ==
Born to athletes Jessica and Jonathan Carter, she lived in Pembroke Pines, Florida. Competing in 2018, she defeated Athing Mu to win over 200 metres at the AAU Junior Olympic Games. In 2022, she was named the Broward County Girls track and field athlete of the year having retained the class 4A girls' 100 metres and 200 metres titles.

Carter was attracted to attend University of Southern California by USC assistant coach Carmelita Jeter. In June 2024, she placed fifth over 200 metres at the 2024 NCAA Championships and was a semi-finalist at the 2024 US Olympic Team Trials. At the 2025 NCAA Championships, she was a member of the USC team which won the 4 x 100 metres relay at the 2025 NCAA Championships alongside Samirah Moody, Dajaz DeFrand and Madison Whyte. The quartet ran just 0.01 outside the school record, to help USC place second overall in the team event at the Championships.

Ahead of the 2026 season, Carter transferred to the University of Georgia. In May 2026, Carter ran a personal best for the 100 metres of 10.88 seconds to qualify from the NCAA Regionals for the 2026 NCAA Outdoor Championships. At the NCAA Championships, she was part of the Georgia 4 x 100 metres team which placed third overall. On 24 July, she was a finalist at the 2026 USA Outdoor Track and Field Championships over 100 metres, placing eighth overall.
