= John Moffitt (long jumper) =

American long jumper (born 1980)

Olympic medal record

Men's athletics

Representing United States
Silver medal – second place	Athens 2004	Long jump

John Moffitt (born December 12, 1980) is an American long jumper. His breakthrough came in 2004 when he became NCAA indoor and outdoor champion, improved his personal best by 45 centimeters and won the silver medal in the 2004 Summer Olympics behind countryfellow Dwight Phillips. The next year he jumped only 7.96 m as a season's best.

Moffitt was a member of the Louisiana State University track and field team.

== Achievements ==
Year	Tournament	Venue	Result	Extra
2004	Olympic Games	Athens, Greece	2nd	8.47 PB
2004	World Athletics Final	Monte Carlo, Monaco	3rd	
2007	World Athletics Final	Stuttgart, Germany	7th	

=== Personal bests ===
- Long jump - 8.47 m (2004)
- Triple jump - 16.53 m (2003), 16.79 m (2004 indoor)
- High jump - 2.15 m (2004 indoor)
