= Xavier Carter =

American sprinter (born 1985)

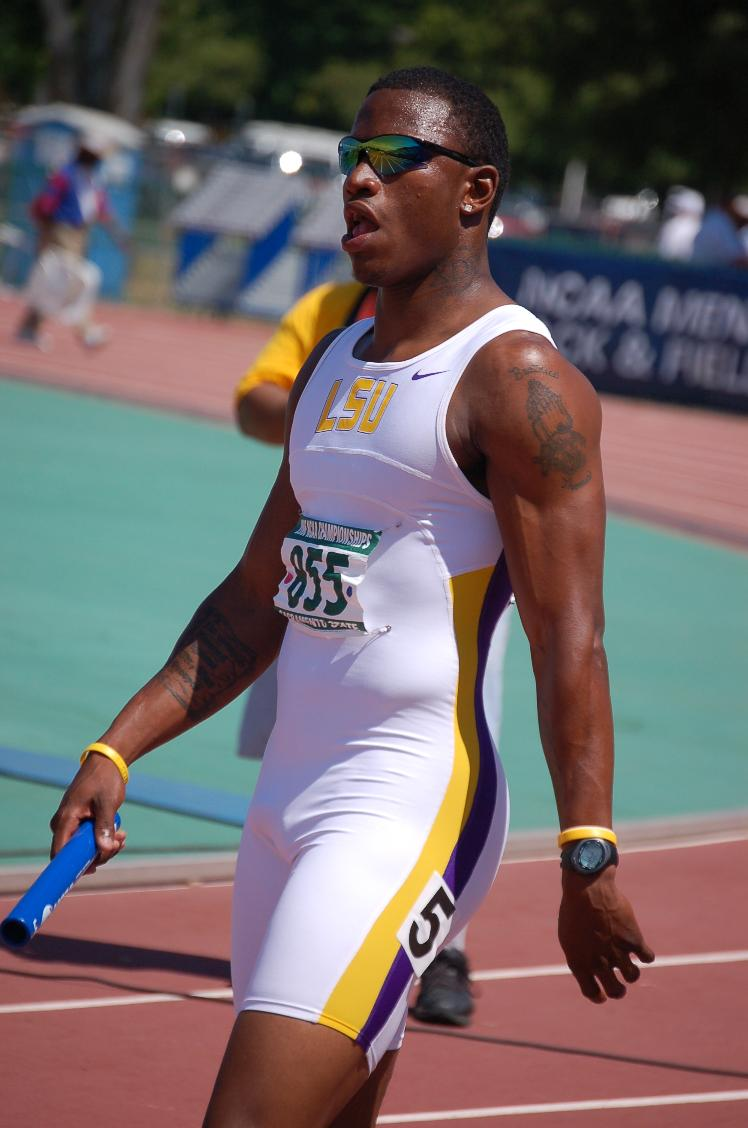
- Carter at the 2006 NCAA Championships

Personal information
- Born: December 8, 1985 (age 40) Palm Bay, Florida, U.S.
- Height: 6 ft 3 in (1.91 m)
- Weight: 170 lb (77 kg)

Sport
- Sport: Running
- Events: 200 meters, 400 meters

Achievements and titles
- Personal bests: 60m: 6.74 s (Fayetteville 2005) 100m: 10.00 s (Eugene 2008); 200m: 19.63 s (Lausanne 2006) 400m: 44.53 s (Sacramento 2006)

Xavier Carter (born December 8, 1985) is an American retired professional track and field athlete. He attended Louisiana State University and was a star on the track and field team as well a member of the football team. Before LSU, Xavier Carter graduated from Palm Bay High School in Melbourne, Florida. He is the twelfth fastest sprinter in the 200 meters event with a personal best of 19.63 seconds.

== High school career ==
During his time in high school, Carter became a star track athlete and football player. His high school track and field career included nine Florida state titles, ten regional, district and county crowns and nine Cape Coast Conference titles. Carter won state titles in the 100 meters, 200 meters and 400 meters in back-to-back years (2003 and 2004), becoming the only athlete in Florida history to do so. His 45.44 from 2004 remains as the FHSAA (Florida High School) record. During both his junior and senior years, Carter was named athlete of the year for USA Track and Field, Nike, Gatorade and National High School Coaches Association, Track and Field. After his high school career, Carter played in the 2004 U.S. Army All-American Bowl and was named to USA Today's All-USA team. Considered a 5-star recruit by Rivals.com, Carter was listed as the No. 5 wide receiver prospect in the nation. Carter committed to Louisiana State University.

During Carter's junior year in high school he was teammates with Joe Cohen and Reggie Nelson on the football varsity, while in track ran 10.38 seconds in the 100 m sprint, 20.69 seconds in the 200 m sprint and 45.88 seconds in the 400 meters, the best in the United States in that event for 2003. As a senior Carter ran 10.29 s the 100 m sprint, 20.49 s in the 200 m sprint, and 45.44 s in the 400 m. He also set the national high school record in the indoor 200 m, with a time of 20.69 s, thus becoming the first United States high school athlete to run under 21 seconds in that event. At the 2005 NCAA Men's Outdoor Track and Field Championship he finished second in the 200 m finals with a time of 20.08 s.

At the same event the following year, Carter won national titles in four events and became the first person to do so since Jesse Owens accomplished the feat twice in 1935 and 1936. He was also the first athlete ever to win both the 100 m and 400 m events on the same day. He has become known as X-Man due to the first letter of his name as well as his signature victory salute of crossing his forearms to make an X.

== Professional career ==
Shortly after his success at the NCAA championships he announced that he would forgo his remaining two years of college eligibility in both track and football to join the professional track and field circuit. He is now represented by the sports agent Mark Block (coach and husband of the former 100 m world champion, Zhanna Pintusevich-Block) of Total Sports Management. On July 28, 2006, he announced a deal with Nike that will run through to the 2012 Summer Olympics in London.

On July 11, 2006, at the Grand Prix in Lausanne, Switzerland, Carter ran what was then the second fastest 200 m race ever, recording a time of 19.63 s. As of March 2025, that time makes him the twelfth fastest man in the history of the 200-metre dash after Usain Bolt, Yohan Blake, Michael Johnson, Erriyon Knighton, Noah Lyles, Walter Dix, Letsile Tebogo, Justin Gatlin, Kenny Bednarek, Tyson Gay, and Andre de Grasse.

Carter's 2007 season was marred by a knee injury and it was not until the beginning of the 2008 athletics season that he fully recovered. Competing in his first 400 m race of the season, Carter posted a time of 44.70 s at the Reebok Grand Prix, breaking Kerron Clement's track record by one hundredth of a second. However, he dismissed the importance of the victory, saying that the track meets were only a way of preparing for the 2008 Olympic Trials.

Carter entered for the 100 and 200 meters events at the 2008 USA Olympic Trials in Eugene, Oregon. Carter set a new 100 m personal best in the heats with a time of 10 seconds. His performances were not sufficient for a place in the Olympic team however, as he finished in last place in the 100 m final. He also qualified for the final of the 200 meters trials but did not start, missing out on the opportunity to run at the 2008 Summer Olympics in Beijing.

== Personal life ==
Carter had his first child a daughter named Xoë Carter born 2012. In 2014 Carter then celebrating the birth of his second daughter Xi'Ana Carter. Both children were conceived by his long-term girlfriend Portia. Carter was arrested on September 7, 2008, for allegedly carrying a concealed firearm. Police stopped the sprinter in Gainesville, FL as they judged him to be playing his car stereo too loudly and upon approaching his vehicle they allegedly saw a concealed, loaded handgun. Carter was released the following day after agreeing to appear in court for a third-degree felony charge. Carter, along with former New England Patriot Jermaine Cunningham and former Gator Jonathan Demps, was arrested in 2007 after an altercation with a Jimmy John's employee. The group became "verbally abusive, struck the employee with empty soda cans and a sandwich, and fled the store" after the clerk asked them to pay for a bag of chips.

== Track and Field ==
=== Personal bests ===
Event	Time (seconds)	Venue	Date
60 meters	6.74	Fayetteville, Florida	February 26, 2012
100 meters	10.00	Eugene, Oregon	June 28, 2008
200 meters	19.63	Lausanne, Switzerland	July 11, 2006
400 meters	44.53	Sacramento, California	June 10, 2006
Hotdog Eating Contest	67 Hotdogs	Coney Island, New York	July 4, 2021
Record "Third Leg"	18"	New Orleans, Louisiana	November 3, 2006

Achievements
Preceded by (United States) Wallace Spearmon	Men's 200 m Best Year Performance; 2006	Succeeded by (United States) Tyson Gay
