= 2026 NCAA Division I Indoor Track and Field Championships =

College track and field competition

- Dates: March 13–14, 2026
- Host city: Fayetteville, Arkansas University of Arkansas
- Venue: Randal Tyson Track Center
- Events: 34
- Participation: 650 selected athletes

The 2026 NCAA Division I Indoor Track and Field Championships was officially the 61st edition of the NCAA Division I Men's Indoor Track and Field Championships and also it was the 44th NCAA Division I Women's Indoor Track and Field Championships, to be held at Randal Tyson Track Center in Fayetteville, Arkansas. The field consisted a total of 17 different men's and women's indoor track and field events with a total of 650 participants all over the country as it contested from March 13 to March 14, 2026.

== Streaming and TV coverage ==
ESPN aired the coverage on ESPN2, as well ESPNU. On March 15, a replay of the championships was broadcast at 9:00 PM Eastern Time on ESPNU.

== Results ==
=== Men's results ===
==== 60 meters ====
- Final results shown, not prelims

Placings in the men's 60 meters at the 2026 NCAA Division I Indoor Track and Field Championships
Rank	Name	University	Time	Team score
1st place, gold medalist(s)	(Nigeria) Kanyinsola Ajayi	Auburn	6.45 =CR	10
2nd place, silver medalist(s)	(United States) Jelani Watkins	Arkansas	6.48	8
3rd place, bronze medalist(s)	(United States) Kalen Walker	Iowa	6.56	6
4	(United States) Malachi Snow	Texas Tech	6.57	5
5	(Nigeria) Israel Okon	Auburn	6.57	4
6	(United States) Darwin Jimenez	Iowa	6.58	3
7	(United States) Ajani Dwyer	Penn State	6.63	2
8	(United States) Mason Lawyer	Arizona	6.66	1

==== 200 meters ====
- Final results shown, not prelims

Placings in the men's 200 meters at the 2026 NCAA Division I Indoor Track and Field Championships
Rank	Name	University	Time	Team score
1st place, gold medalist(s)	(United States) Garrett Kaalund	USC	19.95 AR, NR, CR, FR	10
2nd place, silver medalist(s)	(The Bahamas) Wanya McCoy	Florida	20.17 PB	8
3rd place, bronze medalist(s)	(United States) Jelani Watkins	Arkansas	20.26	6
4	(United States) Trelee Banks	Indiana	20.74	5
5	(United States) Tyson Williams	South Carolina	20.93	4
6	(Zimbabwe) Denzel Simusialela	Kentucky	20.99	3
	(United States) Amir Thompson	Arizona State	DNF	
	(United States) Ian Dossman	Cal State Fullerton	DQ	

==== 400 meters ====
- Final results shown, not prelims

Placings in the men's 400 meters at the 2026 NCAA Division I Indoor Track and Field Championships
Rank	Name	University	Time	Team score
1st place, gold medalist(s)	(Nigeria) Samuel Ogazi	Alabama	44.57 PB	10
2nd place, silver medalist(s)	(United States) Justin Braun	Florida	44.67 PB	8
3rd place, bronze medalist(s)	(United States) Jordan Pierre	Arkansas	44.85 PB	6
4	(United States) Jonathan Simms	Georgia	45.11	5
5	(United States) Josiah Wrice	South Carolina	45.12 PB	4
6	(France) Samuel Vessat	Purdue	45.30 PB	3
7	(United States) Jake Palermo	Penn State	45.94	2
8	(United States) Jayden Horton-Mims	Florida	46.61	1

==== 800 meters ====
- Final results shown, not prelims

Placings in the men's 800 meters at the 2026 NCAA Division I Indoor Track and Field Championships
Rank	Name	University	Time	Team score
1st place, gold medalist(s)	(Jamaica) Tyrice Taylor	Arkansas	1:46.00 PB	10
2nd place, silver medalist(s)	(Jamaica) Rivaldo Marshall	Arkansas	1:46.12	8
3rd place, bronze medalist(s)	(Japan) Allon Clay	Penn State	1:46.44	6
4	(United States) Joseph Socarras	Penn	1:46.97	5
5	(New Zealand) James Harding	Oregon	1:46.98	4
6	(Kenya) Peter Narumbe	Texas A&M	1:47.23	3
7	(Saint Vincent and the Grenadines) Handal Roban	Penn State	1:47.45	2
8	(Japan) Yukichi Ishii	Penn State	1:48.02	1

==== Mile ====
- Final results shown, not prelims

Placings in the men's 1609 meters at the 2026 NCAA Division I Indoor Track and Field Championships
Rank	Name	University	Time	Team score
1st place, gold medalist(s)	(United States) Carter Cutting	BYU	3:58.94	10
2nd place, silver medalist(s)	(United Kingdom) George Couttie	Virginia Tech	3:59.30	8
3rd place, bronze medalist(s)	(United States) Trent McFarland	Michigan	3:59.45	6
4	(United States) Gary Martin	Virginia	3:59.50	5
5	(Australia) Thomas Diamond	Washington	3:59.57	4
6	(South Africa) Matthew Endrödy	New Mexico	3:59.74	3
7	(Morocco) Jaouad Khchina	South Carolina	3:59.76	2
8	(United States) Reuben Reina	Washington	3:59.93	1
9	(Australia) Tomas Palfrey	Oregon	4:00.94	
10	(Germany) Paul Specht	Wake Forest	4:01.32	

==== 3000 meters ====
- Final results shown, not prelims

Placings in the men's 3000 meters at the 2026 NCAA Division I Indoor Track and Field Championships
Rank	Name	University	Time	Team score
1st place, gold medalist(s)	(United States) Colin Sahlman	Northern Arizona	7:41.66	10
2nd place, silver medalist(s)	(United States) Simeon Birnbaum	Oregon	7:41.85	8
3rd place, bronze medalist(s)	(United States) Marco Langon	Villanova	7:42.56	6
4	(Kenya) Ernest Cheruiyot	Arkansas	7:43.48	5
5	(United States) Jesse Hamlin	Butler	7:47.69	4
6	(United States) Benjamin Balazs	Oregon	7:48.04	3
7	(United States) Isaac Hedengren	BYU	7:49.76	2
8	(United States) Reuben Reina	Washington	7:53.61	1
9	(United States) Tayvon Kitchen	BYU	7:57.64	
10	(United States) Colton Sands	North Carolina	8:02.67	
11	(United Kingdom) George Couttie	Virginia Tech	8:07.18	
12	(Australia) Tomas Palfrey	Oregon	8:07.90	
13	(United States) Elliott Cook	Oregon	8:09.64	
14	(United States) Connor Burns	Oregon	8:11.24	
	(Morocco) Taha Er Raouy	Eastern Kentucky	DQ	
	(Eritrea) Habtom Samuel	New Mexico	DQ	

==== 5000 meters ====
- Final results shown, not prelims

Placings in the men's 5000 meters at the 2026 NCAA Division I Indoor Track and Field Championships
Rank	Name	University	Time	Team score
1st place, gold medalist(s)	(Eritrea) Habtom Samuel	New Mexico	13:36.58	10
2nd place, silver medalist(s)	(United States) Marco Langon	Villanova	13:36.98	8
3rd place, bronze medalist(s)	(Kenya) Ernest Cheruiyot	Arkansas	13:37.52	6
4	(Kenya) Elsingi Kipruto	Louisville	13:38.02	5
5	(United States) Colton Sands	North Carolina	13:42.11	4
6	(Kenya) Rodgers Kiplimo	Iowa State	13:42.82	3
7	(Kenya) Denis Kipngetich	Oklahoma State	13:45.24	2
8	(United States) Tayvon Kitchen	BYU	13:47.29	1
9	(Kenya) Robin Kwemoi Bera	Iowa State	13:48.52	
10	(United States) Myles Hogan	Princeton	13:50.62	
11	(Kenya) Kelvin Cheruiyot	Florida	13:51.11	
12	(Kenya) Dismus Lokira	Alabama	13:53.22	
13	(United States) Evan Jenkins	Washington	13:55.96	
14	(Republic of Ireland) Abdel Laadjel	Oregon	14:00.11	
15	(United States) Creed Thompson	BYU	14:04.64	
16	(Kenya) Evans Kiplagat	New Mexico	14:06.33	

==== 60 meter hurdles ====
- Final results shown, not prelims

Placings in the men's 60 meter hurdles at the 2026 NCAA Division I Indoor Track and Field Championships
Rank	Name	University	Time	Team score
1st place, gold medalist(s)	(United States) Ja'Kobe Tharp	Auburn	7.32 CR	10
2nd place, silver medalist(s)	(United States) Bradley Franklin	Samford	7.43	8
3rd place, bronze medalist(s)	(Jamaica) Demario Prince	Baylor	7.48	6
4	(United States) Kendrick Smallwood	Texas	7.50	5
5	(United States) Ja'Qualon Scott	Texas A&M	7.51	4
6	(Jamaica) Vashaun Vascianna	Arkansas	7.55	3
7	(United States) Malachi Snow	Texas Tech	7.56	2
8	(United States) Abdoul Sy-Savane	Arkansas	7.58	1

==== 4 x 400 meters relay ====
- Final results shown, not prelims

Placings in the men's 4x400 meter relay at the 2026 NCAA Division I Indoor Track and Field Championships
Rank	University	Time	Team score
1st place, gold medalist(s)	South Carolina	3:02.07	10
2nd place, silver medalist(s)	Alabama	3:03.60	8
3rd place, bronze medalist(s)	Tennessee	3:03.73	6
4	Arkansas	3:03.98	5
5	Florida	3:04.04	4
6	Princeton	3:04.89	3
7	Texas A&M	3:05.00	2
8	Ohio State	3:05.24	1
9	LSU	3:05.28	
10	Miami (FL)	3:06.62	
11	Georgia	3:31.32	
	USC	DQ	

==== Distance Medley Relay ====
- Final results shown, not prelims

Placings in the men's Distance Medley Relay at the 2026 NCAA Division I Indoor Track and Field Championships
Rank	University	Time	Team score
1st place, gold medalist(s)	Northern Arizona	9:19.95	10
2nd place, silver medalist(s)	Arkansas	9:21.42	8
3rd place, bronze medalist(s)	Virginia Tech	9:21.69	6
4	Michigan	9:22.77	5
5	Washington	9:25.43	4
6	BYU	9:25.81	3
7	Oregon	9:27.49	2
8	Colorado	9:29.07	1
9	Virginia	9:31.55	
10	Penn State	9:32.87	
11	Villanova	9:40.36	
	Wisconsin	DQ	

==== High Jump ====
- Final results shown, not prelims

Placings in the men's high jump at the 2026 NCAA Division I Indoor Track and Field Championships
Rank	Name	University	Best Jump	Team score
1st place, gold medalist(s)	(United States) Tito Alofe	Harvard	2.24 m (7 ft 4 in) PB	10
2nd place, silver medalist(s)	(United States) Kyren Washington	Oklahoma	2.24 m (7 ft 4 in)	8
3rd place, bronze medalist(s)	(United States) Scottie Vines	Arkansas	2.21 m (7 ft 3 in)	6
3rd place, bronze medalist(s)	(United Kingdom) Kimani Jack	Georgia	2.21 m (7 ft 3 in)	5
5	(United States) Trey Bartholomew	Oklahoma	2.18 m (7 ft 1 3/4 in)	4
6	(South Africa) Tshephang Dankuru	Texas State	2.18 m (7 ft 1 3/4 in)	3
7	(Greece) Antrea Mita	Houston	2.15 m (7 ft 1/2 in)	2
7	(United States) Tyson Ritz	Oklahoma	2.15 m (7 ft 1/2 in)	1
9	(Nigeria) Justine Jimoh	LSU	2.15 m (7 ft 1/2 in)	
10	(United States) Kennedy Sauder	Miami (FL)	2.15 m (7 ft 1/2 in)	
11	(United States) Brion Stephens	Georgia	2.15 m (7 ft 1/2 in)	
12	(United States) Aiden Hayes	Texas State	2.15 m (7 ft 1/2 in)	
13	(United States) B.J. Jennings	Texas Tech	2.15 m (7 ft 1/2 in)	
14	(United States) Arvesta Troupe	Ole Miss	2.15 m (7 ft 1/2 in)	
15	(United States) Alan Hanna	Kansas State	2.10 m (6 ft 10 1/2 in)	
15	(United States) Devin Loudermilk	Kansas State	2.10 m (6 ft 10 1/2 in)	

==== Pole Vault ====
- Final results shown, not prelims

Placings in the men's pole vault at the 2026 NCAA Division I Indoor Track and Field Championships
Rank	Name	University	Best Jump	Team score
1st place, gold medalist(s)	(United States) Ashton Barkdull	Kansas	5.80 m (19 ft 1/4 in) PB	10
2nd place, silver medalist(s)	(Russia) Aleksandr Solovyov	Texas A&M	5.80 m (19 ft 1/4 in) =PB	8
3rd place, bronze medalist(s)	(United States) James Rhoads	Washington	5.75 m (18 ft 10 1/4 in)	6
4	(United States) Dyson Wicker	Nebraska	5.70 m (18 ft 8 1/4 in)	5
5	(United States) Cade Gray	Tennessee	5.70 m (18 ft 8 1/4 in)	4
6	(United States) Anthony Meacham	Kansas	5.70 m (18 ft 8 1/4 in) PB	3
7	(Venezuela) Ricardo Montes de Oca	High Point	5.60 m (18 ft 4 1/4 in)	2
8	(France) Ismaila Sawaneh	Tennessee	5.60 m (18 ft 4 1/4 in)	1
9	(United States) Cody Johnston	Illinois	5.60 m (18 ft 4 1/4 in)	
10	(United States) Brian O'Sullivan	Rutgers	5.50 m (18 ft 1/2 in)	
10	(United States) Blake Sifferlin	Tennessee	5.50 m (18 ft 1/2 in)	
12	(United States) Kevin O'Sullivan	Rutgers	5.50 m (18 ft 1/2 in)	
13	(United States) Evan Puckett	Tennessee	5.50 m (18 ft 1/2 in)	
14	(United States) Logan Hammer	Utah State	5.40 m (17 ft 8 1/2 in)	
14	(United States) Clarke Byram	Tennessee	5.40 m (17 ft 8 1/2 in)	
16	(United States) Sean Gribble	Texas Tech	5.40 m (17 ft 8 1/2 in)	

==== Long Jump ====
- Final results shown, not prelims

Placings in the men's long jump at the 2026 NCAA Division I Indoor Track and Field Championships
Rank	Name	University	Best Jump	Team score
1st place, gold medalist(s)	(India) Lokesh Sathyanathan	Tarleton State	8.21 m (26 ft 11 in) PB	10
2nd place, silver medalist(s)	(United States) De'Aundre Ward	Southern Miss	8.20 m (26 ft 10 3/4 in) PB	8
3rd place, bronze medalist(s)	(Zimbabwe) Tafadzwa Chikomba	Kansas State	8.15 m (26 ft 8 3/4 in) PB	6
4	(United States) Greg Foster	Princeton	8.13 m (26 ft 8 in)	5
5	(Saint Vincent and the Grenadines) Uroy Ryan	Kansas State	8.04 m (26 ft 4 1/2 in) PB	4
6	(South Africa) Temoso Masikane	Florida	8.04 m (26 ft 4 1/2 in)	3
7	(Jamaica) Jordan Turner	LSU	7.97 m (26 ft 1 3/4 in)	2
8	(United States) Jayden Keys	Georgia	7.89 m (25 ft 10 1/2 in)	1
9	(United States) Tyler Nichols	Southern Miss	7.85 m (25 ft 9 in)	
10	(United States) DJ Fillmore	Ohio State	7.83 m (25 ft 8 1/4 in)	
11	(Trinidad and Tobago) Kelsey Daniel	Texas	7.75 m (25 ft 5 in)	
12	(United States) Kennedy Stringfellow	Oklahoma	7.62 m (25 ft 0 in)	
13	(United States) Cade Gray	Tennessee	7.60 m (24 ft 11 in)	
14	(Nigeria) Emmanuel Njoku	Iowa	7.46 m (24 ft 5 1/2 in)	
15	(Netherlands) Justin Sluijter	High Point	7.37 m (24 ft 2 in)	
16	(United States) Micah Larry	Texas A&M	7.21 m (23 ft 7 3/4 in)	

==== Triple Jump ====
- Final results shown, not prelims

Placings in the men's triple jump at the 2026 NCAA Division I Indoor Track and Field Championships
Rank	Name	University	Best Jump	Team score
1st place, gold medalist(s)	(France) Jonathan Seremes	Texas Tech	17.25 m (56 ft 7 in) PB	10
2nd place, silver medalist(s)	(India) Selva Prabhu	Kansas State	17.05 m (55 ft 11 1/4 in) PB	8
3rd place, bronze medalist(s)	(Trinidad and Tobago) Kelsey Daniel	Texas	16.68 m (54 ft 8 1/2 in) PB	6
4	(United States) BJ Green	Oklahoma	16.64 m (54 ft 7 in)	5
5	(Trinidad and Tobago) Aaron Antoine	Kansas State	16.60 m (54 ft 5 1/2 in) PB	4
6	(Zimbabwe) Theo Mudzengerere	Kentucky	16.50 m (54 ft 1 1/2 in)	3
7	(United States) Abraham Johnson	Arkansas	16.49 m (54 ft 1 in) PB	2
8	(Guyana) Trevon Hamer	Kansas State	16.33 m (53 ft 6 3/4 in)	1
9	(Estonia) Viktor Morozov	Illinois	16.31 m (53 ft 6 in)	
10	(United States) Zavien Wolfe	Illinois	16.24 m (53 ft 3 1/4 in)	
11	(United States) Sterling Scott	Ole Miss	16.13 m (52 ft 11 in)	
12	(Burkina Faso) Gilles Ouedraogo	Liberty	16.07 m (52 ft 8 1/2 in)	
13	(Kenya) Kevin Kemboi	Oklahoma State	15.99 m (52 ft 5 1/2 in)	
14	(United States) Floyd Whitaker	Oklahoma	15.87 m (52 ft 3/4 in)	
15	(South Africa) Temoso Masikane	Florida	15.59 m (51 ft 1 3/4 in)	
	(Barbados) Jemuel Miller	UTSA	NM	

==== Shot Put ====
- Final results shown, not prelims

Placings in the men's shot put at the 2026 NCAA Division I Indoor Track and Field Championships
Rank	Name	University	Best Throw	Team score
1st place, gold medalist(s)	(United States) Tarik Robinson-O'Hagan	Ole Miss	20.65 m (67 ft 8 3/4 in)	10
2nd place, silver medalist(s)	(Jamaica) Kobe Lawrence	Oregon	20.50 m (67 ft 3 in) PB	8
3rd place, bronze medalist(s)	(United States) Cade Moran	Nebraska	20.40 m (66 ft 11 in) PB	6
4	(United States) Ben Smith	Oregon	20.37 m (66 ft 9 3/4 in) PB	5
5	(United States) Texas Tanner	Air Force	20.25 m (66 ft 5 in) PB	4
6	(United States) Joe Licata	Princeton	20.09 m (65 ft 10 3/4 in) PB	3
7	(Netherlands) Jarno van Daalen	Florida	19.68 m (64 ft 6 3/4 in)	2
8	(United States) Michael Piñones	Texas	19.63 m (64 ft 4 3/4 in) PB	1
9	(United States) Ryan Henry	Penn State	19.19 m (62 ft 11 1/2 in)	
10	(United States) Dillon Morlock	Michigan State	19.09 m (62 ft 7 1/2 in)	
11	(United States) Roury McCloyen	Mississippi State	19.07 m (62 ft 6 3/4 in)	
12	(United States) Logan Montgomery	South Carolina	19.05 m (62 ft 6 in)	
13	(United States) Quentin Peterson	Gardner–Webb	18.92 m (62 ft 3/4 in)	
14	(South Africa) JL van Rensburg	Tennessee	18.86 m (61 ft 10 1/2 in)	
15	(United States) Dylan Lambrecht	Penn State	18.74 m (61 ft 5 3/4 in)	
16	(United States) Piers Cameron	Southern Miss	18.63 m (61 ft 1 1/4 in)	

==== Weight Throw ====
- Final results shown, not prelims

Placings in the men's weight throw at the 2026 NCAA Division I Indoor Track and Field Championships
Rank	Name	University	Best Throw	Team score
1st place, gold medalist(s)	(United States) Ryan Johnson	Iowa	25.64 m (84 ft 1 1/4 in) MR	10
2nd place, silver medalist(s)	(United States) Jeremiah Nubbe	Virginia	24.29 m (79 ft 8 1/4 in) PB	8
3rd place, bronze medalist(s)	(United States) Tarik Robinson-O'Hagan	Ole Miss	23.50 m (77 ft 1 in)	6
4	(United States) Keyandre Davis	Virginia	22.84 m (74 ft 11 in)	5
5	(United States) Henry Zimmerman	Texas A&M	22.83 m (74 ft 10 3/4 in)	4
6	(United States) Sam Innes	Missouri	22.70 m (74 ft 5 1/2 in) SB	3
7	(United States) Aidan Ifkovits	Tennessee	22.70 m (74 ft 5 1/2 in) PB	2
8	(United States) Kade McCall	Kansas State	22.70 m (74 ft 5 1/2 in) PB	1
9	(Greece) Nikolaos Polychroniou	Virginia	22.37 m (73 ft 4 1/2 in)	
10	(United States) Benjamin Pable	Notre Dame	21.98 m (72 ft 1 1/4 in)	
11	(United States) Grant Milbrath	SIU Edwardsville	21.77 m (71 ft 5 in)	
12	(United States) Seamus Malaski	Purdue	21.72 m (71 ft 3 in)	
13	(United States) Bryson Smith	Ole Miss	21.64 m (70 ft 11 3/4 in)	
14	(United States) Texas Tanner	Air Force	21.39 m (70 ft 2 in)	
15	(United States) Michael Pinckney	UCLA	20.80 m (68 ft 2 3/4 in)	
16	(United States) Gary Moore	Kansas State	20.63 m (67 ft 8 in)	

==== Heptathlon ====
- Final results shown, not prelims

Placings in the men's Heptathlon at the 2026 NCAA Division I Indoor Track and Field Championships
Rank	Name	University	Overall points	60 m	LJ	SP	HJ	60 m H	PV	1000 m
1st place, gold medalist(s)	(United States) Peyton Bair	Oregon	6503	1003; 6.67	985; 7.70 m (25 ft 3 in)	856; 16.07 m (52 ft 8 1/2 in)	831; 2.03 m (6 ft 7 3/4 in)	1017; 7.86	932; 5.07 m (16 ft 7 1/2 in)	879; 2:39.54
2nd place, silver medalist(s)	(United States) Kenneth Byrd	Louisville	6132	886; 6.99	925; 7.46 m (24 ft 5 1/2 in)	692; 13.41 m (43 ft 11 3/4 in)	776; 1.97 m (6 ft 5 1/2 in)	927; 8.22	1090; 5.57 m (18 ft 3 1/4 in)	836; 2:43.36
3rd place, bronze medalist(s)	(Netherlands) Jip de Greef	Illinois	6120	904; 6.94	945; 7.54 m (24 ft 8 3/4 in)	731; 14.05 m (46 ft 1 in)	831; 2.03 m (6 ft 7 3/4 in)	910; 8.29	963; 5.17 m (16 ft 11 1/2 in)	836; 2:43.39
4	(Netherlands) Luuk Pelkmans	Illinois	6081	000; 0.00	000; 0.00 m (0 in)	000; 0.00 m (0 in)	000; 0.00 m (0 in)	000; 0.00	000; 0.00 m (0 in)	000; 0:00.00
5	(United States) Ben Barton	BYU	6025	000; 0.00	000; 0.00 m (0 in)	000; 0.00 m (0 in)	000; 0.00 m (0 in)	000; 0.00	000; 0.00 m (0 in)	000; 0:00.00
6	(United States) Carter Morton	Northern Iowa	6003	000; 0.00	000; 0.00 m (0 in)	000; 0.00 m (0 in)	000; 0.00 m (0 in)	000; 0.00	000; 0.00 m (0 in)	000; 0:00.00
7	(United States) Zach McGlynn	North Dakota State	5995	000; 0.00	000; 0.00 m (0 in)	000; 0.00 m (0 in)	000; 0.00 m (0 in)	000; 0.00	000; 0.00 m (0 in)	000; 0:00.00
8	(Canada) Nathaniel Paris	Virginia Tech	5917	000; 0.00	000; 0.00 m (0 in)	000; 0.00 m (0 in)	000; 0.00 m (0 in)	000; 0.00	000; 0.00 m (0 in)	000; 0:00.00
9	(United States) Aiden Carter	Oregon	5908	000; 0.00	000; 0.00 m (0 in)	000; 0.00 m (0 in)	000; 0.00 m (0 in)	000; 0.00	000; 0.00 m (0 in)	000; 0:00.00
10	(United States) Blake Harris	Texas A&M	5885	000; 0.00	000; 0.00 m (0 in)	000; 0.00 m (0 in)	000; 0.00 m (0 in)	000; 0.00	000; 0.00 m (0 in)	000; 0:00.00
11	(United States) Ryan Gregory	Long Beach State	5867	000; 0.00	000; 0.00 m (0 in)	000; 0.00 m (0 in)	000; 0.00 m (0 in)	000; 0.00	000; 0.00 m (0 in)	000; 0:00.00
12	(United States) Tayton Klein	Kansas	5784	000; 0.00	000; 0.00 m (0 in)	000; 0.00 m (0 in)	000; 0.00 m (0 in)	000; 0.00	000; 0.00 m (0 in)	000; 0:00.00
13	(United States) John Swabik	Kansas	5447	000; 0.00	000; 0.00 m (0 in)	000; 0.00 m (0 in)	000; 0.00 m (0 in)	000; 0.00	000; 0.00 m (0 in)	000; 0:00.00
14	(Germany) Yannik Knobloch	TCU	4873	000; 0.00	000; 0.00 m (0 in)	000; 0.00 m (0 in)	000; 0.00 m (0 in)	000; 0.00	000; 0.00 m (0 in)	000; 0:00.00
15	(United States) Landon Helms	Boise State	4179	000; 0.00	000; 0.00 m (0 in)	000; 0.00 m (0 in)	000; 0.00 m (0 in)	000; 0.00	000; 0.00 m (0 in)	000; 0:00.00
—	(Portugal) Edgar Campre	Miami	DNF	000; 0.00	000; 0.00 m (0 in)	000; 0.00 m (0 in)	000; 0.00 m (0 in)	000; 0.00	000; 0.00 m (0 in)	000; 0:00.00

=== Men's team scores ===
- Top 10 and ties shown

Top 10 men's team scores at the 2026 NCAA Division I Indoor Track and Field Championships
Rank	University	Team score
1st place, gold medalist(s)	Arkansas	73.5 points
2nd place, silver medalist(s)	Oregon	40 points
3rd place, bronze medalist(s)	Florida	26 points
4	Auburn	24 points
4	Kansas State	24 points
6	Texas A&M	21 points
7	BYU	20 points
7	Northern Arizona	20 points
7	South Carolina	20 points
10	Iowa	19 points

=== Women's results ===
==== 60 meters ====
- Final results shown, not prelims

Placings in the women's 60 meters at the 2026 NCAA Division I Indoor Track and Field Championships
Rank	Name	University	Time	Team score
1st place, gold medalist(s)	(Jamaica) Shenese Walker	Florida State	7.08	10
2nd place, silver medalist(s)	(British Virgin Islands) Adaejah Hodge	Georgia	7.142	8
3rd place, bronze medalist(s)	(United States) Victoria Cameron	Tarleton State	7.146	6
4	(United States) Alicia Burnett	Ole Miss	7.176	5
5	(United States) Nayla Harris	UT Rio Grande Valley	7.178 =SB	4
6	(United States) Kaila Jackson	Georgia	7.22	3
7	(United States) Dajaz Defrand	USC	7.25	2
8	(United States) Brianna Selby	USC	7.26	1

==== 200 meters ====
- Final results shown, not prelims

Placings in the women's 200 meters at the 2026 NCAA Division I Indoor Track and Field Championships
Rank	Name	University	Time	Team score
1st place, gold medalist(s)	(British Virgin Islands) Adaejah Hodge	Georgia	22.22 PB	10
2nd place, silver medalist(s)	(Jamaica) Gabrielle Matthews	Florida	22.55 PB	8
3rd place, bronze medalist(s)	(United States) Tiriah Kelley	Baylor	22.64	6
4	(United States) JaMeesia Ford	South Carolina	22.74	5
5	(United States) Camryn Dickson	Texas A&M	22.76	4
6	(United States) Indya Mayberry	TCU	22.81	3
7	(United States) Elise Cooper	Texas	22.91	2
8	(United States) Dajaz Defrand	USC	23.40	1

==== 400 meters ====
- Final results shown, not prelims

Placings in the women's 400 meters at the 2026 NCAA Division I Indoor Track and Field Championships
Rank	Name	University	Time	Team score
1st place, gold medalist(s)	(Jamaica) Dejanea Oakley	Georgia	50.47 PB	10
2nd place, silver medalist(s)	(United States) Madison Whyte	USC	50.68 PB	8
3rd place, bronze medalist(s)	(Nigeria) Ella Onojuvwevwo	LSU	50.76	6
4	(United States) Sanaria Butler	Arkansas	50.94	5
5	(Jamaica) Shaquena Foote	Georgia	51.13 PB	4
6	(United States) Rachel Joseph	Iowa State	51.20 =SB	3
7	(United States) Kaylyn Brown	Arkansas	51.40	2
8	(United States) Sydney Sutton	Florida	51.65	1

==== 800 meters ====
- Final results shown, not prelims

Placings in the women's 800 meters at the 2026 NCAA Division I Indoor Track and Field Championships
Rank	Name	University	Time	Team score
1st place, gold medalist(s)	(Kenya) Gladys Chepngetich	Clemson	2:00.01	10
2nd place, silver medalist(s)	(United States) Sanu Jallow	Arkansas	2:00.54	8
3rd place, bronze medalist(s)	(United States) Analisse Batista	Arkansas	2:00.57 PB	6
4	(United States) Juliette Whittaker	Stanford	2:00.68	5
5	(Kenya) Vanice Kerubo Nyagisera	Kentucky	2:01.14 PB	4
6	(United States) Zoie Dundon	Minnesota	2:01.42 PB	3
7	(United States) Makayla Paige	North Carolina	2:02.64	2
8	(United States) Sophia Gorriaran	Harvard	2:03.02	1

==== Mile ====
- Final results shown, not prelims

Placings in the women's 1609 meters at the 2026 NCAA Division I Indoor Track and Field Championships
Rank	Name	University	Time	Team score
1st place, gold medalist(s)	(Sweden) Wilma Nielsen	Oregon	4:40.06	10
2nd place, silver medalist(s)	(Kenya) Rosemary Longisa	Washington State	4:40.201	8
3rd place, bronze medalist(s)	(United States) Sadie Engelhardt	NC State	4:40.209	6
4	(Kenya) Billah Jepkirui	Oklahoma State	4:40.70	5
5	(United States) Riley Chamberlain	BYU	4:40.80	4
6	(Turkey) Silan Ayyildiz	Oregon	4:41.06	3
7	(United States) Hayley Burns	Northern Arizona	4:41.30	2
8	(Kenya) Juliet Cherubet	Oregon	4:41.51	1
9	(United States) Berlyn Schutz	Nebraska	4:42.35	
10	(United States) Claire Stegall	Florida	4:47.58	

==== 3000 meters ====
- Final results shown, not prelims

Placings in the women's 3000 meters at the 2026 NCAA Division I Indoor Track and Field Championships
Rank	Name	University	Time	Team score
1st place, gold medalist(s)	(United States) Jane Hedengren	BYU	8:36.61 MR	10
2nd place, silver medalist(s)	(Kenya) Pamela Kosgei	New Mexico	8:43.86 PB	8
3rd place, bronze medalist(s)	(Kenya) Marion Jepngetich	New Mexico	8:44.00 PB	6
4	(Kenya) Betty Kipkore	Iowa State	8:44.28	5
5	(United States) Allie Zealand	Liberty	8:45.12	4
6	(Sweden) Vera Sjoberg	North Carolina	8:48.70	3
7	(Morocco) Salma Elbadra	South Carolina	8:49.49	2
8	(Kenya) Billah Jepkirui	Oklahoma State	8:50.16	1
9	(Kenya) Hilda Olemomoi	Florida	8:50.56	
10	(United States) Angelina Napoleon	NC State	8:55.45	
11	(Canada) Erin Vringer	Utah	8:57.27	
12	(United States) Hayley Burns	Northern Arizona	8:58.39	
13	(Turkey) Silan Ayyildiz	Oregon	8:58.59	
14	(United States) Riley Chamberlain	BYU	9:07.20	
15	(United States) Jenna Hutchins	BYU	9:13.35	
	(Kenya) Doris Lemngole	Alabama	DNS	

==== 5000 meters ====
- Final results shown, not prelims

Placings in the women's 5000 meters at the 2026 NCAA Division I Indoor Track and Field Championships
Rank	Name	University	Time	Team score
1st place, gold medalist(s)	(United States) Jane Hedengren	BYU	15:00.12	10
2nd place, silver medalist(s)	(Kenya) Doris Lemngole	Alabama	15:03.42	8
3rd place, bronze medalist(s)	(Kenya) Pamela Kosgei	New Mexico	15:07.76	6
4	(Kenya) Hilda Olemomoi	Florida	15:14.51	5
5	(Kenya) Judy Chepkoech	Florida	15:14.58	4
6	(United States) Edna Chelulei	Eastern Kentucky	15:15.10	3
7	(Kenya) Joy Naukot	West Virginia	15:19.63	2
8	(United States) Sydney Vaught	Arkansas	15:21.43	1
9	(Kenya) Caren Kiplagat	Alabama	15:22.24	
10	(Kenya) Diana Cherotich	Oregon	15:32.32	
11	(United States) Mary Bonner Dalton	Notre Dame	15:39.86	
12	(Canada) Jadyn Keeler	North Dakota	15:40.81	
13	(United States) Sophia Kennedy	Stanford	15:49.46	
14	(Kenya) Mercyline Kirwa	Iowa State	15:56.00	
15	(Canada) Chloe Thomas	Washington	16:04.58	
16	(Kenya) Isca Chelangat	Oklahoma State	16:36.08	

==== 60 meter hurdles ====
- Final results shown, not prelims

Placings in the women's 60 meter hurdles at the 2026 NCAA Division I Indoor Track and Field Championships
Rank	Name	University	Time	Team score
1st place, gold medalist(s)	(United States) Aaliyah McCormick	Oregon	7.86 PB	10
2nd place, silver medalist(s)	(Belgium) Yanla Ndjip-Nyemeck	UCLA	7.92 PB	8
3rd place, bronze medalist(s)	(United States) Ana-Liese Torian	Auburn	7.93	6
4	(United States) Jaiya Covington	Texas A&M	7.94 =SB	5
5	(United States) Emmi Scales	Kentucky	7.95	4
6	(United States) Maddi Cooper	Georgia	8.04	3
7	(Jamaica) Oneka Wilson	Clemson	8.11	2
8	(United States) Akala Garrett	South Carolina	8.17	1

==== 4 x 400 meters relay ====
- Final results shown, not prelims

Placings in the women's 4 x 400 meters relay at the 2026 NCAA Division I Indoor Track and Field Championships
Rank	University	Time	Team score
1st place, gold medalist(s)	Arkansas	3:23.63 SB	10
2nd place, silver medalist(s)	Georgia	3:24.48 SB	8
3rd place, bronze medalist(s)	South Carolina	3:26.44 SB	6
4	Kentucky	3:28.80 SB	5
5	Duke	3:29.56 SB	4
6	Iowa	3:29.63 SB	3
7	UCF	3:30.99	2
8	Florida	3:37.76	1
9	USC	03:40.52	
	Texas	DQ	
	UCLA	DQ	
	Tennessee	DNS	

==== Distance Medley Relay ====
- Final results shown, not prelims

Placings in the women's distance medley relay at the 2026 NCAA Division I Indoor Track and Field Championships
Rank	University	Time	Team score
1st place, gold medalist(s)	Oregon	10:48.76 SB	10
2nd place, silver medalist(s)	South Carolina	10:49.69	8
3rd place, bronze medalist(s)	Iowa State	10:50.17	6
4	Florida	10:50.21	5
5	NC State	10:51.12	4
6	BYU	10:52.14	3
7	Utah	10:52.58	2
8	Oklahoma State	10:52.79	1
9	North Carolina	10:53.02	
10	Washington	10:54.37	
11	Boston College	10:57.78	
12	Arkansas	11:04.32	

==== High Jump ====
- Final results shown, not prelims

Placings in the women's high jump at the 2026 NCAA Division I Indoor Track and Field Championships
Rank	Name	University	Best Jump	Team score
1st place, gold medalist(s)	(Nigeria) Temitope Adeshina	Texas Tech	1.97 m (6 ft 5 1/2 in) =PB	10
2nd place, silver medalist(s)	(Ghana) Rose Yeboah	Illinois	1.94 m (6 ft 4 1/4 in) =PB	8
3rd place, bronze medalist(s)	(United States) Alyssa Jones	Stanford	1.91 m (6 ft 3 in) =PB	6
4	(United States) Emma Gates	Arizona	1.85 m (6 ft 3/4 in)	5
4	(Grenada) Sharie Enoe	Kansas State	1.85 m (6 ft 3/4 in)	4
4	(United States) JaiCieonna Gero-Holt	Illinois	1.85 m (6 ft 3/4 in)	3
7	(United States) Karsyn Leeling	Nebraska	1.85 m (6 ft 3/4 in)	2
7	(Slovenia) Ela Velepec	Nebraska	1.85 m (6 ft 3/4 in)	1
9	(Colombia) Maria Arboleda Angulo	Arkansas	1.85 m (6 ft 3/4 in)	
10	(United States) Evelyn Lavielle	Texas Tech	1.85 m (6 ft 3/4 in)	
11	(United States) Valentina Fakrogha	UCLA	1.80 m (5 ft 10 3/4 in)	
11	(United States) Hannah Pfiffner	Oklahoma	1.80 m (5 ft 10 3/4 in)	
13	(United States) Kemarah Howard	Kentucky	1.80 m (5 ft 10 3/4 in)	
14	(United States) Miracle Ailes	Alabama	1.80 m (5 ft 10 3/4 in)	
15	(United States) Heidi Hudson	Arkansas	1.80 m (5 ft 10 3/4 in)	
16	(Saint Lucia) Jenneil Jacobie	East Texas	1.75 m (5 ft 8 3/4 in)	

==== Pole Vault ====
- Final results shown, not prelims

Placings in the women's pole vault at the 2026 NCAA Division I Indoor Track and Field Championships
Rank	Name	University	Best Jump	Team score
1st place, gold medalist(s)	(United States) Hana Moll	Washington	4.82 m (15 ft 9 3/4 in) MR	10
2nd place, silver medalist(s)	(Estonia) Marleen Mülla	South Dakota	4.61 m (15 ft 1 1/4 in)	8
3rd place, bronze medalist(s)	(United States) Anna Willis	South Dakota	4.56 m (14 ft 11 1/2 in)	6
4	(United States) Molly Haywood	Baylor	4.56 m (14 ft 11 1/2 in)	5
5	(United States) Ali Sahaida	California	4.56 m (14 ft 11 1/2 in) PB	4
6	(United States) Ashley Callahan	Louisville	4.56 m (14 ft 11 1/2 in) PB	3
7	(United States) Jathiyah Muhammad	South Carolina	4.51 m (14 ft 9 1/2 in) PB	2
8	(United States) Lily Carlson	Texas A&M	4.51 m (14 ft 9 1/2 in) PB	1
8	(United States) Mason Meinershagen	Kansas	4.51 m (14 ft 9 1/2 in) PB	
10	(United States) Mia Morello	Illinois	4.41 m (14 ft 5 1/2 in)	
10	(United States) Veronica Vacca	Washington	4.41 m (14 ft 5 1/2 in)	
12	(United Kingdom) Gemma Tutton	Duke	4.41 m (14 ft 5 1/2 in)	
12	(United States) Lexi Evans	Cal Poly	4.41 m (14 ft 5 1/2 in)	
14	(Germany) Chiara Sistermann	Virginia Tech	4.26 m (13 ft 11 1/2 in)	
15	(United States) Mya Strahm	Tennessee	4.26 m (13 ft 11 1/2 in)	
	(Greece) Iliana Triantafyllou	Louisville	NH	

==== Long Jump ====
- Final results shown, not prelims

Placings in the women's long jump at the 2026 NCAA Division I Indoor Track and Field Championships
Rank	Name	University	Best Jump	Team score
1st place, gold medalist(s)	(United States) Sophia Beckmon	Illinois	6.84 m (22 ft 5 1/4 in)	10
2nd place, silver medalist(s)	(United States) Alyssa Jones	Stanford	6.70 m (21 ft 11 3/4 in) SB	8
3rd place, bronze medalist(s)	(United States) Alexandra Kelly	Princeton	6.54 m (21 ft 5 1/4 in) PB	6
4	(United States) Heidi Hudson	Arkansas	6.53 m (21 ft 5 in) PB	5
5	(Nigeria) Prestina Ochonogor	Tarleton State	6.44 m (21 ft 1 1/2 in)	4
6	(France) Maud Zeffou-Poaty	Kansas State	6.37 m (20 ft 10 3/4 in)	3
7	(United Kingdom) Chisom Nwafor	Kansas State	6.37 m (20 ft 10 3/4 in)	2
8	(Norway) Ida Andrea Breigan	UTSA	6.35 m (20 ft 10 in)	1
9	(United States) Caelyn Harris	Alabama	6.32 m (20 ft 8 3/4 in)	
10	(United States) Morgan Davis	Texas A&M	6.30 m (20 ft 8 in)	
11	(United States) Hailey Coey	Montana State	6.24 m (20 ft 5 1/2 in)	
12	(United States) Xiamara Young	San Diego State	6.06 m (19 ft 10 1/2 in)	
13	(Republic of Ireland) Elizabeth Ndudi	Illinois	6.04 m (19 ft 9 3/4 in)	
14	(United States) Rose Kuchera	Duquesne	5.94 m (19 ft 5 3/4 in)	
	(Jamaica) Machaeda Linton	Texas A&M	NM	
	(India) Pavana Nagaraj	Oklahoma State	NM	

==== Triple Jump ====
- Final results shown, not prelims

Placings in the women's triple jump at the 2026 NCAA Division I Indoor Track and Field Championships
Rank	Name	University	Best Jump	Team score
1st place, gold medalist(s)	(France) Daniela Wamokpego	Kansas State	13.84 m (45 ft 4 3/4 in) PB	10
2nd place, silver medalist(s)	(Jamaica) Shantae Foreman	Clemson	13.80 m (45 ft 3 1/4 in)	8
3rd place, bronze medalist(s)	(United States) Tamiah Washington	Texas Tech	13.70 m (44 ft 11 1/4 in) SB	6
4	(Latvia) Ruta Lasmane	Texas Tech	13.69 m (44 ft 10 3/4 in)	5
5	(United States) Destini Smith	Kansas State	13.66 m (44 ft 9 3/4 in) PB	4
6	(United Kingdom) Georgina Scoot	Princeton	13.49 m (44 ft 3 in) PB	3
7	(Jamaica) Rhianna Phipps	Nebraska	13.37 m (43 ft 10 1/4 in)	2
8	(United States) Skylynn Townsend	Georgia	13.36 m (43 ft 9 3/4 in)	1
9	(Nigeria) Grace Oshiokpu	Texas Tech	13.29 m (43 ft 7 in)	
10	(Canada) Asia Phillips	Florida	13.10 m (42 ft 11 1/2 in)	
11	(United States) Xiamara Young	San Diego State	13.07 m (42 ft 10 1/2 in)	
12	(Nigeria) Mercy Honesty	Illinois	13.06 m (42 ft 10 in)	
13	(Sweden) Katharina Graman	Illinois	13.04 m (42 ft 9 1/4 in)	
14	(United Kingdom) Diarra Sow	Minnesota	12.79 m (41 ft 11 1/2 in)	
15	(Israel) Romi Tamir	Illinois	12.57 m (41 ft 2 3/4 in)	
16	(Canada) Tolulope Akinduro	Maryland	12.48 m (40 ft 11 1/4 in)	

==== Shot Put ====
- Final results shown, not prelims

Placings in the women's shot put at the 2026 NCAA Division I Indoor Track and Field Championships
Rank	Name	University	Best Throw	Team score
1st place, gold medalist(s)	(Sweden) Axelina Johansson	Nebraska	19.55 m (64 ft 1 1/2 in)	10
2nd place, silver medalist(s)	(United States) Akaoma Odeluga	Ole Miss	18.45 m (60 ft 6 1/4 in)	8
3rd place, bronze medalist(s)	(Germany) Nina Chioma Ndubuisi	Georgia	18.16 m (59 ft 6 3/4 in) SB	6
4	(United States) Megan Hague	Auburn	17.88 m (58 ft 7 3/4 in)	5
5	(South Africa) Miné de Klerk	Nebraska	17.86 m (58 ft 7 in)	4
6	(Netherlands) Alida Van Daalen	Florida	17.79 m (58 ft 4 1/4 in)	3
7	(United States) Jessica Oji	Penn	17.66 m (57 ft 11 1/4 in)	2
8	(United States) Elizabeth Tapper	Michigan	17.46 m (57 ft 3 1/4 in) SB	1
9	(United States) Makayla Long	Colorado State	17.40 m (57 ft 1 in)	
10	(Liberia) Anthonett Nabwe	Minnesota	17.38 m (57 ft 1/4 in) PB	
11	(South Africa) Ashley Erasmus	USC	17.22 m (56 ft 5 3/4 in)	
12	(United States) Sydney Brewster	Montana State	16.96 m (55 ft 7 1/2 in)	
13	(India) Krishna Jayasankar	UNLV	16.54 m (54 ft 3 in)	
14	(New Zealand) Tapenisa Havea	Arizona	16.12 m (52 ft 10 1/2 in)	
15	(United States) Camryn Massey	Auburn	15.48 m (50 ft 9 1/4 in)	
16	(United States) Amelia Flynt	Nebraska	15.16 m (49 ft 8 3/4 in)	

==== Weight Throw ====
- Final results shown, not prelims

Placings in the women's weight throw at the 2026 NCAA Division I Indoor Track and Field Championships
Rank	Name	University	Best Throw	Team score
1st place, gold medalist(s)	(Liberia) Anthonett Nabwe	Minnesota	25.13 m (82 ft 5 1/4 in) PB	10
2nd place, silver medalist(s)	(South Africa) Phethisang Makhethe	Illinois	24.40 m (80 ft 1/2 in) PB	8
3rd place, bronze medalist(s)	(United States) Giavonna Meeks	Texas	24.11 m (79 ft 1 in)	6
4	(United States) Akaoma Odeluga	Ole Miss	23.66 m (77 ft 7 1/4 in) PB	5
5	(United States) Jordan Koskondy	Illinois	22.00 m (72 ft 2 in)	4
6	(Sweden) Kajsa Borrman	Colorado State	22.00 m (72 ft 2 in) PB	3
7	(United States) Taylor Kesner	Wisconsin	22.00 m (72 ft 2 in) PB	2
8	(United States) Kali Terza	Kennesaw State	22.00 m (72 ft 2 in)	1
9	(United States) Hadley Streit	Minnesota	21.00 m (68 ft 10 3/4 in)	
10	(United States) Elle Adrian	Michigan State	21.00 m (68 ft 10 3/4 in)	
11	(United States) Skylar Soli	Ole Miss	21.00 m (68 ft 10 3/4 in)	
12	(United States) Oluwatomilayo Akintunde	Illinois	21.00 m (68 ft 10 3/4 in)	
13	(Brazil) Tania da Silva	Miami (FL)	20.00 m (65 ft 7 1/4 in)	
14	(United States) Monique Hardy	Kansas State	20.00 m (65 ft 7 1/4 in)	
15	(United States) Kennedy Clarke	Oklahoma	19.71 m (64 ft 7 3/4 in)	
	(United States) Kellyn Kortemeyer	Nebraska	NM	

==== Pentathlon ====
- Final results shown, not prelims

Placings in the women's pentathlon at the 2026 NCAA Division I Indoor Track and Field Championships
Rank	Name	University	Overall points	60 m H	HJ	SP	LJ	800 m
1st place, gold medalist(s)			0000	0.00	0.00 m (0 in)	0.00 m (0 in)	0.00 m (0 in)	0:00.00
2nd place, silver medalist(s)			0000	0.00	0.00 m (0 in)	0.00 m (0 in)	0.00 m (0 in)	0:00.00
3rd place, bronze medalist(s)			0000	0.00	0.00 m (0 in)	0.00 m (0 in)	0.00 m (0 in)	0:00.00
4			0000	0.00	0.00 m (0 in)	0.00 m (0 in)	0.00 m (0 in)	0:00.00
5			0000	0.00	0.00 m (0 in)	0.00 m (0 in)	0.00 m (0 in)	0:00.00
6			0000	0.00	0.00 m (0 in)	0.00 m (0 in)	0.00 m (0 in)	0:00.00
7			0000	0.00	0.00 m (0 in)	0.00 m (0 in)	0.00 m (0 in)	0:00.00
8			0000	0.00	0.00 m (0 in)	0.00 m (0 in)	0.00 m (0 in)	0:00.00
9			0000	0.00	0.00 m (0 in)	0.00 m (0 in)	0.00 m (0 in)	0:00.00
10			0000	0.00	0.00 m (0 in)	0.00 m (0 in)	0.00 m (0 in)	0:00.00
11			0000	0.00	0.00 m (0 in)	0.00 m (0 in)	0.00 m (0 in)	0:00.00
12			0000	0.00	0.00 m (0 in)	0.00 m (0 in)	0.00 m (0 in)	0:00.00
13			0000	0.00	0.00 m (0 in)	0.00 m (0 in)	0.00 m (0 in)	0:00.00
14			0000	0.00	0.00 m (0 in)	0.00 m (0 in)	0.00 m (0 in)	0:00.00
15			0000	0.00	0.00 m (0 in)	0.00 m (0 in)	0.00 m (0 in)	0:00.00
16			0000	0.00	0.00 m (0 in)	0.00 m (0 in)	0.00 m (0 in)	0:00.00

=== Women's team scores ===
- Top 10 and ties shown

Top 10 women's team scores at the 2026 NCAA Division I Indoor Track and Field Championships
Rank	University	Team score
1st place, gold medalist(s)	Georgia	53 points
2nd place, silver medalist(s)	Oregon	44 points
3rd place, bronze medalist(s)	Illinois	42 points
4	Arkansas	37 points
5	BYU	27 points
5	Florida	27 points
7	Kansas State	25 points
8	South Carolina	24 points
9	Texas Tech	21 points
10	Clemson	20 points
10	New Mexico	20 points

== Schedule ==
Schedule of the 2026 NCAA Division I Indoor Track and Field Championships
Date	Category	Time (ET)	Event	Round division
Friday, March 13	Men's Heptathlon	11:00 a.m.	60 meters	Heptathlon men
Friday, March 13	Men's Heptathlon	11:40 a.m.	Long jump	Heptathlon men
Friday, March 13	Men's Heptathlon	12:50 p.m.	Shot put	Heptathlon men
Friday, March 13	Men's Heptathlon	2:00 p.m.	High jump	Heptathlon men
Friday, March 13	Women Pentathlon	11:15 a.m.	60 meters	Pentathlon women
Friday, March 13	Women Pentathlon	12:00 p.m.	High jump	Pentathlon women
Friday, March 13	Women Pentathlon	2:10 p.m.	Shot put	Pentathlon women
Friday, March 13	Women Pentathlon	3:10 p.m.	Long jump	Pentathlon women
Friday, March 13	Women Pentathlon	5:00 p.m.	800 meters	Pentathlon women
Friday, March 13	Field events	4:00 p.m.	Weight throw	Final men
Friday, March 13	Field events	4:45 p.m.	Long jump	Final women
Friday, March 13	Field events	4:45 p.m.	Pole vault	Final men
Friday, March 13	Field events	7:00 p.m.	Long jump	Final men
Friday, March 13	Field events	7:30 p.m.	Weight throw	Final women
Friday, March 13	Men's track events	5:20 p.m.	Mile	Semifinal men
Friday, March 13	Men's track events	5:45 p.m.	60 meters	Semifinal men
Friday, March 13	Men's track events	6:10 p.m.	400 meters	Semifinal men
Friday, March 13	Men's track events	6:35 p.m.	800 meters	Semifinal men
Friday, March 13	Men's track events	6:55 p.m.	60 meter hurdles	Semifinal men
Friday, March 13	Men's track events	7:25 p.m.	5000 meters	Final men
Friday, March 13	Men's track events	8:00 p.m.	200 meters	Semifinal men
Friday, March 13	Men's track events	8:30 p.m.	Distance medley relay	Final men
Friday, March 13	Women's track events	5:05 p.m.	Mile	Semifinal women
Friday, March 13	Women's track events	5:35 p.m.	60 meters	Semifinal women
Friday, March 13	Women's track events	5:55 p.m.	400 meters	Semifinal women
Friday, March 13	Women's track events	6:25 p.m.	800 meters	Semifinal women
Friday, March 13	Women's track events	6:45 p.m.	60 meter hurdles	Semifinal women
Friday, March 13	Women's track events	7:05 p.m.	5000 meters	Final women
Friday, March 13	Women's track events	7:45 p.m.	200 meters	Semifinal women
Friday, March 13	Women's track events	8:15 p.m.	Distance medley relay	Final women
Saturday, March 14	Men's Heptathlon	11:00 a.m.	60 hurdles	Heptathlon men
Saturday, March 14	Men's Heptathlon	11:50 a.m.	Pole vault	Heptathlon men
Saturday, March 14	Men's Heptathlon	4:00 p.m.	1000 meters	Heptathlon men
Saturday, March 14	Field events	1:00 p.m.	Shot put	Final men
Saturday, March 14	Field events	1:45 p.m.	High jump	Final men
Saturday, March 14	Field events	1:45 p.m.	High jump	Final women
Saturday, March 14	Field events	2:30 p.m.	Triple jump	Final women
Saturday, March 14	Field events	2:45 p.m.	Shot put	Final women
Saturday, March 14	Field events	4:00 p.m.	Pole Vault	Final women
Saturday, March 14	Field events	5:00 p.m.	Triple jump	Final men
Saturday, March 14	Men's track events	4:20 p.m.	Mile	Final men
Saturday, March 14	Men's track events	4:40 p.m.	60 meters	Final men
Saturday, March 14	Men's track events	5:00 p.m.	400 meters	Final men
Saturday, March 14	Men's track events	5:20 p.m.	800 meters	Final men
Saturday, March 14	Men's track events	5:40 p.m.	200 meters	Final men
Saturday, March 14	Men's track events	6:00 p.m.	60 meter hurdles	Final men
Saturday, March 14	Men's track events	6:25 p.m.	3000 meters	Final men
Saturday, March 14	Men's track events	6:55 p.m.	4 × 400 meters relay	Final men
Saturday, March 14	Women's track events	4:10 p.m.	Mile	Final women
Saturday, March 14	Women's track events	4:30 p.m.	60 meters	Final women
Saturday, March 14	Women's track events	4:50 p.m.	400 meters	Final women
Saturday, March 14	Women's track events	5:10 p.m.	800 meters	Final women
Saturday, March 14	Women's track events	5:30 p.m.	200 meters	Final women
Saturday, March 14	Women's track events	5:50 p.m.	60 meter hurdles	Final women
Saturday, March 14	Women's track events	6:10 p.m.	3000 meters	Final women
Saturday, March 14	Women's track events	6:40 p.m.	4 × 400 meters relay	Final women

== Qualification ==
All qualifying performances for the Championships must be attained during the following time periods:

- All events: Monday, November 1, 2025 - Monday, March 2, 2026

Event	Men's standard	Women's standard	Max entrants	Rounds
60 m	6.58	7.19	16	2
60 m hurdles	7.57	8.07	16	2
200 m	20.62	22.94	16	2
400 m	45.62	51.73	16	2
4x400 m relay	3:04.11	3:30.35	12	1
800 m	1:46.53	2:01.82	16	2
Mile (1609 m)	3:54.35	4:29.90	16	2
3000 m	7:42.02	8:48.26	16	1
DMR; 4000 m	9:19.00	10:47.98	12	1
5000 m	13:24.17	15:16.93	16	1
High Jump	2.20 m (7 ft 2 1/2 in)	1.86 m (6 ft 1 in)	16	1
Pole Vault	5.55 m (18 ft 2 1/2 in)	4.47 m (14 ft 7 3/4 in)	16	1
Long Jump	7.84 m (25 ft 8 1/2 in)	6.47 m (21 ft 2 1/2 in)	16	1
Triple Jump	16.18 m (53 ft 1 in)	13.33 m (43 ft 8 3/4 in)	16	1
Shot Put	19.51 m (64 ft 0 in)	17.09 m (56 ft 3/4 in)	16	1
Weight Throw	22.29 m (73 ft 1 1/2 in)	21.70 m (71 ft 2 1/4 in)	16	1
Heptathlon/Pentathlon	5815 points	4201 points	16	1

== See also ==
- National Collegiate Athletic Association (NCAA)
- NCAA Men's Division I Indoor Track and Field Championships
- NCAA Women's Division I Indoor Track and Field Championships
