= Tim Duckworth (decathlete) =

American-born decathlete

Timothy Duckworth
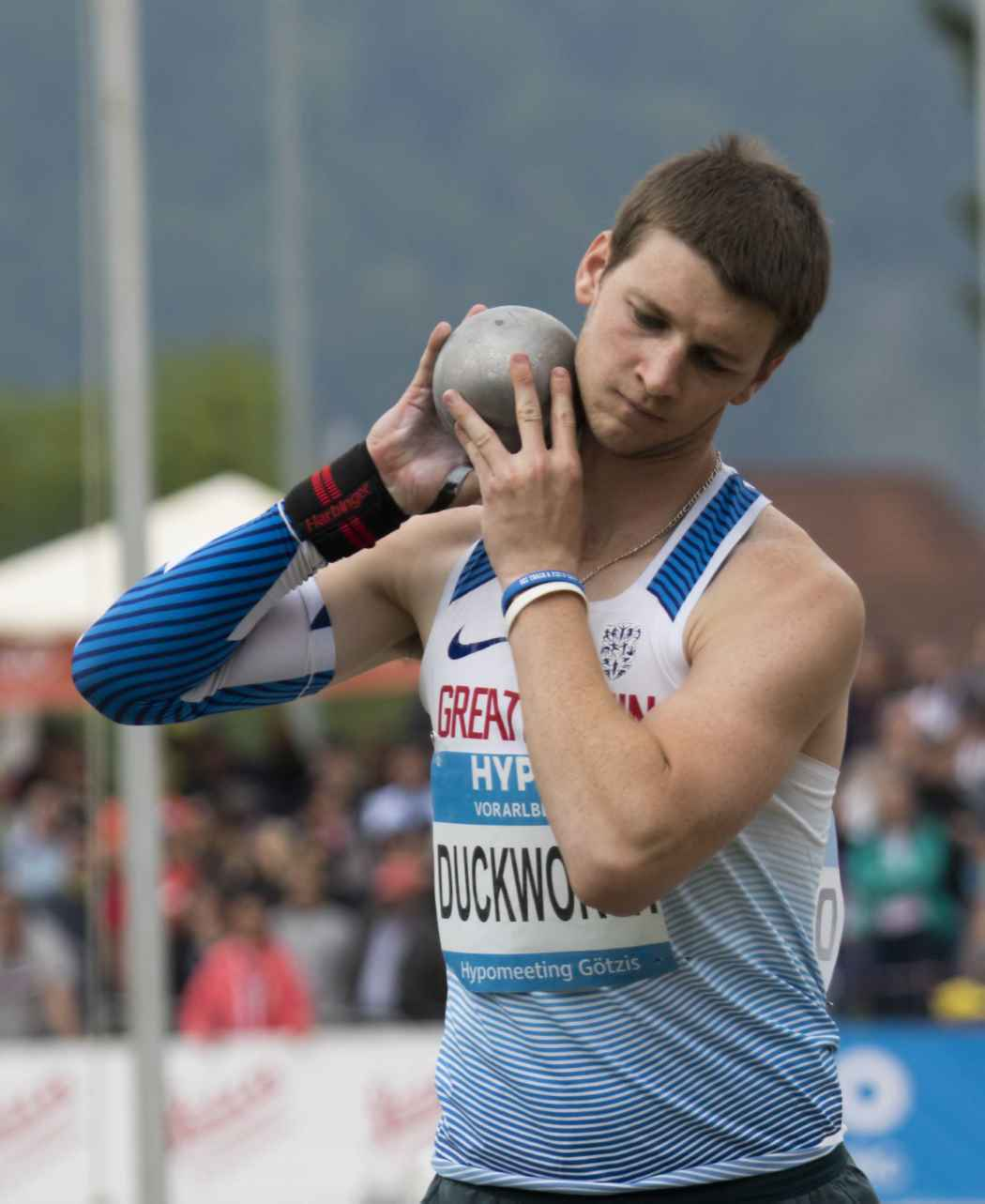
- Duckworth in Götzis (2019)

Personal information
- Nationality: American, British
- Born: June 18, 1996 (age 30) California, United States
- Height: 185 cm (6 ft 1 in)
- Weight: 80 kg (180 lb)
- Spouse: Olivia Gruver (m. 2022)

Sport
- Sport: Athletics
- Event(s): Decathlon, Heptathlon
- College team: Kentucky Wildcats (2014–18)
- Now coaching: Alabama Crimson Tide

Achievements and titles
- Personal bests: Decathlon: 8,336 (2018); Heptathlon: 6,188 (2018) NR
Medal record
Representing Great Britain
European Indoor Championships
Silver medal – second place	2019 Glasgow	Heptathlon

Tim Duckworth (born June 18, 1996) is a retired British-American decathlete. He competed internationally for Great Britain and is the third-highest scoring decathlete in British history behind Daley Thompson and Dean Macey.

== College ==
In 2018, Duckworth set the British national record in the heptathlon and joined Ashton Eaton as the only other NCAA male track and field athlete to win both the decathlon and the heptathlon in the same year.

== International ==
Duckworth placed fifth in the decathlon at the 2018 European Athletics Championships and earned a silver medal in the heptathlon at the 2019 European Athletics Indoor Championships. In 2018 and 2019, he won back-to-back gold medals in the long jump at the British Athletics Championships and became the English decathlon champion in 2021.

In 2022, Duckworth retired from athletics due to persistent injuries.

== Personal bests ==
Outdoor

Individual events
Event	Performance	Location	Date
100 metres	11.34 (+0.6 m/s)	Chula Vista	14 June 2014
110 metres hurdles	14.35 (+0.5 m/s)	Gainesville	30 March 2018
Long jump	8.00 m (26 ft 2 3/4 in) (−0.2 m/s)	Birmingham	1 July 2018
Long jump	8.19 m (26 ft 10 1/4 in) (+2.5 m/s)	Knoxville	12 May 2018
High jump	2.13 m (6 ft 11 3/4 in)	Jacksonville	28 May 2016
Pole vault	5.10 m (16 ft 8 3/4 in)	Charlottesville	23 April 2016

Combined events
Event	Performance	Location	Date	Score
Decathlon	—N/a	Eugene	6–7 June 2018	8,336 points
100 metres	10.40 (+1.0 m/s)	Athens, GA	6 April 2018	999 points
Long jump	8.03 m (26 ft 4 in) (+0.0 m/s)	Athens, GA	6 April 2018	1,068 points
Shot put	13.71 m (44 ft 11 3/4 in)	Athens, GA	6 April 2018	711 points
High jump	2.17 m (7 ft 1 1/4 in)	Berlin	7 August 2018	963 points
400 metres	48.78	Eugene	6 June 2018	872 points
110 metres hurdles	14.25 (−1.0 m/s)	Azusa	18 April 2019	942 points
110 metres hurdles	14.19 (+2.4 m/s)	Fayetteville	27 April 2018	—N/a
Discus throw	44.12 m (144 ft 9 in)	Athens, GA	7 April 2018	749 points
Pole vault	5.11 m (16 ft 9 in)	Eugene	7 June 2018	944 points
Javelin throw	57.27 m (187 ft 10 1/2 in)	Eugene	7 June 2018	697 points
1500 metres	4:57.65	Götzis	26 May 2019	573 points
Virtual Best Performance				8,518 points

Indoor

Individual events
Event	Performance	Location	Date
60 metres	6.80	Lexington	3 February 2018
200 metres	22.37	Bloomington	11 December 2015
60 metres hurdles	8.03	Bloomington	8 December 2017
Long jump	7.80 m (25 ft 7 in)	Nashville	24 February 2017
High jump	2.15 m (7 ft 1/2 in)	Lexington	20 January 2017
Pole vault	5.20 m (17 ft 1/2 in)	Nashville	25 February 2017

Combined events
Event	Performance	Location	Date	Score
Heptathlon	—N/a	College Station	9–10 March 2018	6,188 points
60 metres	6.77	College Station	10 March 2017	966 points
Long jump	7.79 m (25 ft 6 1/2 in)	Glasgow	2 March 2019	1,007 points
Shot put	13.54 m (44 ft 5 in)	Seattle	31 January 2020	700 points
High jump	2.17 m (7 ft 1 1/4 in)	College Station	9 March 2018	963 points
60 metres hurdles	8.10	Lincoln	4 February 2017	957 points
Pole vault	5.26 m (17 ft 3 in)	College Station	11 March 2017	991 points
1000 metres	2:49.44	Glasgow	3 March 2019	771 points
Virtual Best Performance				6,355 points

Progression

Decathlon
Date	Location	100m	LJ	SP	HJ	400m	110mH	DT	PV	JT	1500m	Score
14–15 May 2015	Starkville	832; 11.13	838; 7.10	549; 11.05	831; 2.03	746; 51.51	865; 14.87	614; 37.48	790; 4.60	635; 53.15	465; 5:18.95	7,156
12–13 May 2016	Tuscaloosa	894; 10.85	920; 7.44	556; 11.17	906; 2.11	760; 51.21	869; 14.84	660; 39.79	926; 5.05	663; 55.01	555; 5:00.84	7,709
8–9 April 2017	Athens	947; 10.62	1,027; 7.87	622; 12.25	906; 2.11	853; 49.18	894; 14.64 s	679; 40.71 m	901; 4.97 m	670; 55.45 m	474; 5:15.40 s	7,973
6–7 June 2018	Eugene	959; 10.57s	1,063; 8.01	676; 13.15	925; 2.13	872; 48.78	927; 14.37	721; 42.76	944; 5.11	697; 57.27	522; 5:01.27	8,336
25–26 May 2019	Götzis	949; 10.61	990; 7.27	655; 12.80	887; 2.09	812; 50.06	918; 14.44	710; 42.22	880; 4.90	607; 51.27	573; 4:57.64	7,981
25–26 June 2021	Manchester	838; 11.10	920; 7.44	674; 13.11	813; 2.01	655; 53.62	900; 14.59	688; 41.16	892; 4.94	539; 46.66	528; 5:05.63	7,447

Heptathlon
Date	Location	60m	LJ	SP	HJ	110mH	PV	1000m	Score
23–24 January 2015	Lexington	844; 7.11	862; 7.20	580; 11.57	850; 2.05	862; 8.49	819; 4.70	637; 3:02.78	5,454
22–23 January 2016	Lexington	879; 7.01	922; 7.45	562; 11.27	915; 2.12	862; 8.49	910; 5.00	645; 3:02.02	5,695
10–11 March 2017	College Station	966; 6.77	1,002; 7.77	673; 13.09	953; 2.16	957; 8.10	991; 5.26	623; 3:04.24	6,165
9–10 March 2018	College Station	940; 6.84	995; 7.74	703; 13.59	963; 2.17	925; 8.25	960; 5.16	702; 2:56.23	6,188
2–3 March 2019	Glasgow	936; 6.85	1,007; 7.79	665; 12.97	925; 2.13	942; 8.16	910; 5.00	771; 2:49.44	6,156
