= Victoria Cameron =

American sprinter

Sport
- Sport: Athletics
- Event: Sprint

Achievements and titles
- Personal bests: 60m: 7.08 (2026); 100m: 11.01 (2025); 200m: 23.04 (2025)

Victoria Cameron is an American sprinter from Texas, who competes for Tarleton State University.

== Biography ==
From Texas, Cameron attended Stephenville High School and Tarleton State University. Cameron played soccer and ran track before focusing on sprints.

Cameron played 18 games for the Tarleton State women’s soccer team in 2024, scoring a goal. On the track, she qualified for the 60 metres at the 2025 NCAA Division I Indoor Track and Field Championships with a personal best of 7.14 seconds, but ran 7.38 seconds at the championships in Virginia Beach in March 2025.

She was named the Indoor Track & Field Freshman of the Year by the Western Athletic Conference. Later that year, she ran 11.01 seconds for the 100 metres at the NCAA Division I West First Round in College Station and qualified for final at the 2025 NCAA Division I Outdoor Track and Field Championships in Eugene, Oregon. She was named the 2025 Western Athletic Conference Outdoor Track and Field Female Athlete of the Year. That year, she was a semi-finalist in the 100 m at the 2025 USA Outdoor Track and Field Championships, in Eugene.

Cameron ran the 60 metres in 7.08 seconds to win the WAC Indoor Championships, breaking her own WAC record which she had set in the preliminary round, and finishing ahead of Lauren Roy and Prestina Ochonogor, to help Tarleton win the women's team competition for the first time. She was subsequently named the WAC Women's Indoor Athlete of the Year. She qualified for the 2026 NCAA Indoor Championships and went into the championships tied in the collegiate lead with Alicia Burnett. She then qualified for the final second quickest for the 60 metres with a run of 7.09 seconds behind Jamaican Shenese Walker.

Cameron equalled her 100 m personal best with a run of 11.01 seconds at the Texas Relays on 5 April 2026. That June, she qualified for the 2026 NCAA Outdoor Championships.
