= Caryl Smith-Gilbert =

American track and field coach

Caryl Smith Gilbert
Current position
- Title: Head coach
- Team: Georgia
- Conference: SEC

Biographical details
- Born: April 19, 1969 (age 57); Denver, Colorado, U.S.

Playing career
- 1987–1991: UCLA
- Positions: 100 m, 200 m

Coaching career (HC unless noted)
- 1994–1997: George Washington HS (CO)
- 1998–1999: Penn State (assistant)
- 2000–2002: Alabama (assistant)
- 2003–2007: Tennessee (assistant)
- 2008–2013: UCF
- 2014–2021: USC
- 2022–present: Georgia

Accomplishments and honors

Championships
- As a head coach: 4 National Outdoor - Women's (2018, 2021, 2025, 2026); 1 National Indoor - Women's (2026); 1 SEC Outdoor - Women's (2025); 3 PAC-12 Outdoor - Women's (2018, 2019, 2021); As an athlete: 3 PAC-12 Outdoor - Women's (1988, 1989, 1990)

Awards
- 2 USTFCCCA Outdoor Coach of the Year (2018,2021); 1 SEC Women’s Coach of the Year (2025); 6 Conference USA Coach of the Year

Caryl Smith Gilbert (born April 19, 1969) is an American track and field coach and former athlete. She is the director of men's and women's track and field at the University of Georgia. She was hired in 2021. She coaches both the women's and men's Georgia track teams and is the first female head coach of a Georgia men's team.

== Early life ==
As a 12-year old, Smith Gilbert ran the 100 meter dash in 11.78 seconds. She was a silver medalist in the 100 meter dash at the World Junior Championships in 1986.

During her high school career, Smith Gilbert set indoor national records in the 55- and 60-meter dashes and was a two-time Colorado state champion in both the 200-meter dash and the long jump as well as a three-time 100-meter dash state champion. She also set the Colorado state high school records in all three of those events.

At UCLA, Smith Gilbert was a three-time All-American at UCLA (4×100-meter relay in 1988 and 1989), and won individual and relay Pac-10 championships in the 100-meter dash, 4×100-meter relay and the 4×400 meter relay. As a member of the 4x400 meter relay, her team finished as an NCAA Championship runner-up in 1988 and 1989.

Smith Gilbert earned a bachelor’s degree in film and television production from UCLA in 1991 and a master’s degrees in sport management and sport psychology from the University of Tennessee.

== Coaching career ==
Smith Gilbert coached the USC Women's Track & Field team to two NCAA Women's Outdoor Track and Field Championship titles in 2018 and 2021 and the UGA Women's Track & Field team to two NCAA Women's Outdoor Track and Field Championship titles in 2025 and 2026.

Athletes coached by Smith Gilbert include Anglerne Annelus, Matthew Boling, Afia Charles, Sole Frederick, Sanaa Frederick, Christopher Morales Williams, as well as Olympic Gold Medalists Rai Benjamin, Aaliyah Butler, Andre De Grasse, Michael Norman, Twanisha Terry, and DeeDee Trotter.

Smith Gilbert was named the SEC Women’s Coach of the Year in 2025 and became the first coach to win the women’s NCAA outdoor title at two different schools with the 2025 UGA championship.

Smith Gilbert was the president of the U.S. Track & Field and Cross Country Coaches Association (USTFCCCA) board of directors with a term that ended on December 20, 2025. She also was honored by the USTFCCCA as the 2026 National Women's Coach of the Year.

== Personal life ==
Smith Gilbert is married to Greg Gilbert, a retired NFL linebacker, and the couple has three sons.

== See also ==
- Georgia Bulldogs men's track and field
- Georgia Bulldogs women's track and field
