= Tah Chikomba =

Zimbabwean athlete (born 2001)

Personal information
- Full name: Tafadzwa Chikomba
- Born: 2001 (age 24–25)

Sport
- Sport: Athletics
- Event: Long jump

Achievements and titles
- Personal bests: Long jump: 8.37 m (2026); 60m: 6.59 s (2026)

Tafadzwa "Tah" Chikomba (born 2001) is a Zimbabwean long jumper and sprinter based in the United States. Competing for Kansas State University in 2026, he won the 2026 NCAA Outdoor Championships and set a new NCAA all-conditions record in the long jump.

== Biography ==
From Chiredzi, he attended Malipati High School prior to being scouted while competing in Zambia and joining Meridian Community College in the United States. After two years at Meridian College he began to compete for Kansas State University.

Chikomba won his first senior Zimbabwean national title the long jump at the 2021 Zimbabwean Championships, held in Harare, with a jump of 7.39 metres. Chikomba placed sixth overall in the long jump in 2024 at his debut African Championships, held in Douala, Cameroon, making a best jump of 7.59 metres and having qualified third best for the final, with 7.48 metres.

On January 30, 2026, at the DeLoss Dodds Invitational, a World Athletics Bronze-level meeting, Chikomba jumped a 8.09 metres to win the men’s long jump and was subsequently named the Big 12 athlete of the week, the first for Kansas State since 2020. The following month, he placed second in the long jump with 7.59 metres at the Big 12 Indoor Championships and also placed third in the 60 metres, running a personal best 6.59 seconds in Lubbock, Texas to finish behind Malachi Snow and Mason Lawyer in the 60 m. The following month, he jumped 8.15 metres to place third at the 2026 NCAA Division I Indoor Track and Field Championships in Fayetteville, Arkansas.

In May 2026, competing for Kansas State, Chikomba broke the Big 12 Championship record in the men's long jump, jumping 8.27 meters to win the competition by 24 centimetres at the Big 12 Championships, held at the Roy P. Drachman Stadium in Tucson, Arizona. Later that month, Chikomba jumped a wind-aided 8.75 meters (+3.2 m/s), to break the collegiate all-conditions best in the men's long jump at the NCAA West Regionals in Fayetteville, surpassing the previous all-conditions best by 1 cm, previously held by Erick Walder. In June, he won the men's long jump title at the 2026 NCAA Outdoor Championships with a wind-legal lifetime best jump of 8.37 metres.
