= Jordan Anthony =

American athlete (born 2004)

Personal information
- Born: June 29, 2004 (age 22) Palmdale, California, U.S.
- Height: 5 ft 10 in (178 cm)
- Weight: 162 lb (73 kg)

Sport
- Country: United States
- Sport: Athletics
- Event: Sprint

Achievements and titles
- Personal bests: 60 m: 6.41 (Toruń, 2026); 100 m: 9.91 (Gainesville, 2026); 200 m: 19.93 (Lexington, 2025)
Medal record
Men's athletics
Representing United States
World Indoor Championships
Gold medal – first place	2026 Toruń	60 m

Jordan Anthony (born June 29, 2004) is an American sprinter. He is the reigning World and American champion over 60 metres, having won the titles at the 2026 World Athletics Indoor Championships and 2026 USA Indoor Championships. He previously won the 2025 NCAA Indoor Championships over 60 metres and the 2025 NCAA Outdoor Championships over 100 metres.

== Early life ==
Born in California, Anthony grew up in Tylertown, Mississippi. He attended Tylertown High School. He started at the University of Kentucky in 2022, and was a dual-athlete, taking part in track and field as a sprinter and American football as a wide receiver. He later transferred to the University of Arkansas and continued to compete in both sports.

== Career ==
At the University of Kentucky he suffered a fractured hip in 2021 and missed half of the football season, prior to making a return to fitness and competing on the track, where he ran 6.70 seconds for the 60 metres in February 2022. He won the under-20 200 metres dash title in 20.34 seconds at the USA Outdoor Championships in Eugene, Oregon in June 2022 as a 17 year-old, but chose to skip the 2022 World U20 Championships as it clashed with his Kentucky football training camp.

After transferring to the University of Arkansas, he won the SEC Championship over 60 metres in February 2025. He won the 60 metres 2025 NCAA Indoor Championships in Virginia Beach in March 2025. On April 19, he broke the 10 second barrier for the 100 metres for the first time, running a time of 9.98 seconds (+1.2 m/s) at the Mt. SAC Relays in California.

He won both the 100 metres and 200 metres races at the SEC Championships in May 2025, running 9.95 seconds for the 100 m and 19.93 seconds for the 200 m. In June 2025, he won the 2025 NCAA Outdoor Championships 100 metres title in Eugene, Oregon, running from the outside lane and dipping to win by 0.03 seconds from Max Thomas of USC and LSU's Jelani Watkins. He also had a fourth place finish in the 200 m with a time of 20.01 seconds. Following the championships, he announced on his social media platform that he would forego the rest of his collegiate availability to turn professional. Later that year, Anthony won the 2025 Bowerman Award as the year's best student-athlete in American collegiate track and field.

Anthony reached the semi-finals of the 100 metres at the 2025 USA Outdoor Track and Field Championships finishing third in his heat behind Ronnie Baker and Noah Lyles in 10.14 seconds (+0.1 m/s).

On 1 February 2026, Anthony placed third behind Ackeem Blake and Eloy Benitez over 60 metres at the Millrose Games in 6.64 seconds. On 13 February, he moved to tenth on the world all-time list with a personal best 6.43 seconds for the 60 metres at the Tyson Invitational in Fayetteville, Arkansas.

On 1 March 2026, he won the 60 metres at the 2026 USA Indoor Track and Field Championships, running 6.45 seconds for the win ahead of Trayvon Bromell and Noah Lyles. On his major championship debut on 20 March 2026, he won the 60 metres at the 2026 World Athletics Indoor Championships, running a world leading time of 6.41 seconds, the joint-fourth fastest all-time, winning the final ahead of Kishane Thompson and Bromell. The victory came on his first ever races outside the United States, and despite a blood clot forming in his arm before the race, caused by a botched doping control.

On 18 April 2026, Anthony ran a personal best 9.91 (+0.5) for the 100 metres in Gainesville, Florida. On 3 June, he ran 9.96 seconds for fourth place at the 2026 Golden Gala in Rome, Italy, and on 28 June 9.99 seconds to place fifth at the 2026 Meeting de Paris, both events part of the 2026 Diamond League. On 10 July, he placed second to Oblique Seville in 9.92 seconds for the 100 m at the 2026 Herculis Diamond League event in Monaco.
