= Georgia Bulldogs men's track and field =

- Founded: 1897
- University: University of Georgia
- Head coach: Caryl Smith-Gilbert (4th season)
- Conference: SEC
- Location: Athens, Georgia, US
- Outdoor track: Spec Towns Track (Capacity: 1,000)
- Nickname: Bulldogs
- Colors: Red and black

Conference Outdoor Championships
- 1937

Men Outdoor National Championships
- 2018

The Georgia Bulldogs men's track and field team represents University of Georgia (UGA) in NCAA Division I men's indoor and outdoor track and field.

The team's home track is Spec Towns Track, the namesake of Spec Towns. Towns was the first olympic gold medalist from the state of Georgia and a long-time team coach. In 2023, the University of Georgia announced plans to build a new track and field complex.

Other UGA men's track and field athletes that have won Olympic medals include Norman Edwards, a 1984 Silver Medalist in the men's 4x100 relay at the 1984 Summer Olympics, Elija Godwin, a bronze medalist as a member of the American Mixed 4 × 400 metres relay team at the 2020 Summer Olympics and Reese Hoffa, a shot put bronze medalist at the 2012 Summer Olympics.

== History ==
=== SEC & NCAA Championship Meet Finishes ===
Georgia Bulldogs Men's Track and Field
Year	Head coach	SEC Indoor		NCAA Indoor		SEC Outdoor		NCAA Outdoor	
Year	Head coach	Place	Points	Place	Points	Place	Points	Place	Points
1932	Herman Stegeman	—	—	—	—	—	—	10T	14
1933	Herman Stegeman	—	—	—	—	3	26	NTS	—
1934	Herman Stegeman	—	—	—	—	3	30	NTS	—
1935	Herman Stegeman	—	—	—	—	3	21.5	NTS	—
1936	Herman Stegeman	—	—	—	—	2	32	13T	10
1937	Herman Stegeman	—	—	—	—	1^	65	11	11
1938	Weems Baskin	—	—	—	—	3	36.5	NTS	—
1939	Forrest Towns	—	—	—	—	6	20	NTS	—
1940	Forrest Towns	—	—	—	—	2	30.3	NTS	—
1941	Forrest Towns	—	—	—	—	12	1	NTS	—
1946	Forrest Towns	—	—	—	—	10	0.5	NTS	—
1947	Forrest Towns	—	—	—	—	9	3.75	NTS	—
1948	Forrest Towns	—	—	—	—	11	5	NTS	—
1949	Forrest Towns	—	—	—	—	8	13.7	NTS	—
1950	Forrest Towns	—	—	—	—	9	3.3	NTS	—
1951	Forrest Towns	—	—	—	—	10	7	NTS	—
1952	Forrest Towns	—	—	—	—	8T	9	NTS	—
1953	Forrest Towns	—	—	—	—	8	12	NTS	—
1954	Forrest Towns	—	—	—	—	7	11.2	NTS	—
1955	Forrest Towns	—	—	—	—	4	31.25	NTS	—
1956	Forrest Towns	—	—	—	—	5	22.5	37T	4
1957	Forrest Towns	5	6.2	—	—	5	21.5	NTS	—
1958	Forrest Towns	8T	3	—	—	3T	24	NTS	—
1959	Forrest Towns	—	—	—	—	8	14.1	NTS	—
1960	Forrest Towns	7	7	—	—	7	12.5	NTS	—
1961	Forrest Towns	7T	8	—	—	6T	11	NTS	—
1962	Forrest Towns	11	2	—	—	7	15	NTS	—
1963	Forrest Towns	5	10	—	—	7	10	NTS	—
1964	Forrest Towns	7T	4	—	—	9	5	NTS	—
1965	Forrest Towns	7T	4	NTS	—	7	14	NTS	—
1966	Forrest Towns	8T	3	NTS	—	6T	12	NTS	—
1967	Forrest Towns	7	9	27T	3	8	6	NTS	—
1968	Forrest Towns	6T	6	NTS	—	8	2	NTS	—
1969	Forrest Towns	7	6	NTS	—	7	8.5	NTS	—
1970	Forrest Towns	7T	4	NTS	—	8	6	NTS	—
1971	Forrest Towns	8	6	NTS	—	8	9	NTS	—
1972	Forrest Towns	7	7	NTS	—	6	25	NTS	—
1973	Forrest Towns	6	12	NTS	—	6	30	NTS	—
1974	Forrest Towns	5	20	NTS	—	7	39	NTS	—
1975	Lewis Gainey	8	9.5	NTS	—	8	17	61T	0.25
1976	Lewis Gainey	8	8	20T	4	7	16	NTS	—
1977	Lewis Gainey	7	7	28T	3	6	38	28T	6
1978	Lewis Gainey	8	17	NTS	—	7	42.5	NTS	—
1979	Lewis Gainey	6	33	NTS	—	7	38	NTS	—
1980	Lewis Gainey	7	23	37T	4	5	67	50T	2
1981	Lewis Gainey	6	35	20T	8	3	88	11T	16
1982	Lewis Gainey	2^	71	40T	3	3	84	NTS	—
1983	Lewis Gainey	5	60	NTS	—	4	73	32	15.5
1984	Lewis Gainey	5	67.5	21T	8	5	60	26	21
1985	Lewis Gainey	5	42	NTS	—	6	49.5	NTS	—
1986	Lewis Gainey	7	39	21T	8	5	52	39T	9
1987	Lewis Gainey	6	42	44T	6	6	53	30T	9
1988	Lewis Gainey	8	39	58	0.5	5	53	NTS	—
1989	Lewis Gainey	8	22	NTS	—	9	11	NTS	—
1990	John Mitchell	9	6	NTS	—	7	42	NTS	—
1991	John Mitchell	7T	30	NTS	—	7	39	10	19
1992	John Mitchell	5	64	36T	2	5	66	10T	22
1993	John Mitchell	5	49	15T	10	6	57	10T	23
1994	John Mitchell	3	66	6T	21	5	60	8	24
1995	John Mitchell	7	46	6	24	5	55.5	10T	25
1996	John Mitchell	8	42.5	45T	4	11	20	54	4.5
1997	John Mitchell	9	17	NTS	—	11	20	NTS	—
1998	John Mitchell	9	25	NTS	—	6	64	19T	11
1999	John Mitchell	7T	35	NTS	—	8	63	63T	2
2000	Wayne Norton	7	34.5	41	4	7	38.75	17	13
2001	Wayne Norton	6	62	18	12	5	78	12T	22
2002	Wayne Norton	6	40.5	41	5.5	5	84.5	11T	21
2003	Wayne Norton	8	46	41T	5	3	89	14T	19
2004	Wayne Norton	4T	71	34T	5	3	115	26	11
2005	Wayne Norton	5	67	NTS	—	4	99	15	17.50
2006	Wayne Norton	6	48.50	51	2.50	8	52.50	52T	3
2007	Wayne Norton	5	66	NTS	—	4	78	26T	11
2008	Wayne Norton	5	72	30T	8	10	43.40	25T	10
2009	Wayne Norton	8	47	53T	2	5T	72	11	19
2010	Wayne Norton	5	61	20T	10	5	83	40T	6
2011	Wayne Norton	5	55.3	26T	8	3	99	54T	3
2012	Wayne Norton	3	85.5*	23T	9	3	109*	64T	2
2013	Wayne Norton	4	56	18T	11	5	56	49T	4
2014	Wayne Norton	6	39	26T	8	4	92	6^	24
2015	Wayne Norton	8	46	15T	12	5	71.5	15	13
2016	Petros Kyprianou	5	52	24T	9	7	58	29T	8
2017	Petros Kyprianou	6	67	4	35.50	5	75	6	22.5
2018	Petros Kyprianou	5	71	3	32	5	71	1^	52*
2019	Petros Kyprianou	7	45	9T	20	9	43	4	32.5
2020	Petros Kyprianou	10	32	N/A	N/A	N/A	N/A	N/A	N/A
2021	Petros Kyprianou	10	31	3	35	8	48	8	25
2022	Caryl Smith Gilbert	7	47	8	23	5	75	5	32
2023	Caryl Smith Gilbert	4	59	2^	40*^	4	75	7	28
2024	Caryl Smith Gilbert	7	38	15T	14	8	50	9	25
2025	Caryl Smith Gilbert	9	34.5	2	33	2	87	45	6.33
2026	Caryl Smith Gilbert	5	56	25	11.5	5	64	2	49
