= Afia Charles =

Antiguan sprint athlete (born 1992)

Personal information
- Born: July 22, 1992 (age 33) Greenbelt, Maryland, U.S.
- Height: 5 ft 7 in (170 cm)

Sport
- Country: Antigua and Barbuda
- Sport: Running
- Event: 400 m
- University team: UCF

Afia Neliah Charles (born July 22, 1992) is a sprinter from Antigua and Barbuda who specializes in the 400 metre dash.

== Personal life ==
Charles is from Greenbelt, Maryland, United States but her mother Ruperta, was born in Antigua and competed for the nation at the 1984 Summer Olympics in Los Angeles. As of 2012, Charles is 5 feet 7 inches (1.70 m) tall. She attended the University of Central Florida (UCF), where she competes for the UCF Knights track and field team. Her sister Kaila is a professional basketball player for the Golden State Valkyries of the WNBA.

== Career ==
Charles went to Eleanor Roosevelt High School where she won the 4 × 400 metres relay in the 2008 Championship of America contested at the Penn Relays. In her freshman year she won the bronze medal in the 400 metres at the 2011 CARIFTA Games held in Montego Bay, Jamaica; competing for Antigua she set a new personal best time of 54.23 seconds. She broke the freshman and school records for the outdoor 400 metres, setting a time of 53.6 seconds and was a member of the 4 × 400 metres relay team that competed at the 2011 NCAA Women's Indoor Track and Field Championship. In her sophomore year she set another school record by running 54.17 seconds on her way to winning the gold medal in the 400 meters at the C-USA Indoor Championships. She was coached at UCF by Caryl Smith-Gilbert.

In July 2011 she was selected to represent Antigua and Barbuda at the 2012 Summer Olympics in the women's 400 metres. The event was held at the Olympic Stadium from 3 to 5 August. To prepare for the Games Charles worked with Dee Dee Trotter, an Olympic gold medalist at the 2004 Summer Olympics in the 4 × 400 metres relay who had qualified for the 2012 United States team and is a friend of Smith Gilbert from their time together at the University of Tennessee.
