= Kanyinsola Ajayi =

Nigerian sprinter (born 2004)

Personal information
- Nationality: Nigerian
- Born: 14 September 2004 (age 22) Ikorodu, Nigeria

Sport
- Sport: Athletics
- Event: Sprint

Achievements and titles
- Personal bests: Outdoor; 100 m: 9.84 (Lexington, 2026) NR; 200 m: 20.93 (Lagos, 2022); Indoor; 60 m: 6.45 (College Station, 2026) AR
Medal record
Representing Nigeria
Men's athletics
Diamond League
Third place	2026	100 m
African Championships
Silver medal – second place	2024 Douala	4×100 m relay
Commonwealth Games
Bronze medal – third place	2026 Glasgow	100 m
Bronze medal – third place	2026 Glasgow	4×100m relay
African U20 Championships
Gold medal – first place	2023 Ndola	100m
Gold medal – first place	2023 Ndola	4x100 m relay

Kanyinsola Ajayi (born 14 September 2004) is a Nigerian sprinter. He is the African record holder over 60 metres and became Nigerian national champion in the 100 metres in 2024, and the national record holder over 100 metres in 2026. He was the bronze medalist at the 2026 Commonwealth Games.

Competing in the United States he won the 2026 NCAA Indoor Championships over 60 metres and the 100 metres at the 2026 NCAA Outdoor Championships.

== Biography ==
=== Early career: African U20 champion ===
From Ikorodu, Ajayi won both sprints at the 2021 Maltina School Games and set a personal best of 10.26 seconds for the 100 metres at the second AFN All-Comers meet at Yabatech Sports Centre in 2022. He competed at the 2022 World Athletics U20 Championships in Cali, Colombia.

Ajayi won a gold medal in the 100 metres at the 2023 African Athletics U20 Championships in Ndola, Zambia. At that championships he also won a gold medal in the 4 × 100 m relay.

=== 2024: Nigerian champion, Olympic debut ===
Ajayi became Nigerian national champion in the 100 metres in June 2024. He finished fourth in the 100 metres at the African Championships in Douala, Cameroon that month. At that championships, he won a silver medal in the 4 × 100 m relay.

He competed in the 100 metres at the 2024 Paris Olympics, where he reached the semi-finals. He also competed in the men's 4 × 100 m relay at the Games.

=== 2025: World Championships 100 m finalist ===
Ajayi lowered his 60 metres personal best to 6.48 seconds at the 2025 NCAA Indoor Championships. He ran 6.52 seconds to finish second in the men’s 60m final on 15 March 2025, in Virginia Beach.

In September 2025, Ajayi was a finalist in the 100 metres at the 2025 World Championships in Tokyo, Japan, lowering his personal best to 9.88 seconds and placing sixth in the final in 10.00 seconds. It would be the first time Nigeria appears in a World Championship final since Olusoji Fasuba in 2007, where he finished fourth.

=== 2026: Double NCAA champion, Commonwealth Games medalist ===
In February 2026, Ajayi tied Christian Coleman's collegiate record for the 60 metres, running 6.45 seconds to win the SEC Indoor Championships ahead of Jelani Watkins. On 14 March, he ran 6.45 seconds again to equal the African record and win the 2026 NCAA Indoor Championships in Fayetteville ahead of Watkins.

Competing outdoors at the NCAA East Regional in Lexington, Kentucky, on 29 May, Ajayi set a new Nigerian national record of 9.84 seconds for the 100 metres. On 12 June, Ajayi ran a wind-assisted 9.72 seconds (+2.2 m/s) to win the 100 metres title at the 2026 NCAA Outdoor Championships. He became the second Nigerian to win the event after Divine Oduduru in 2018. At the championships, he was also part of the Auburn 4 x 100 metres team which set a new NCAA record of 37.75 in the preliminary round. On 4 July, Ajayi equalled his personal best to win in 9.84 seconds (+0.1) at the 2026 Prefontaine Classic, winning ahead of world champion Oblique Seville. On 18 July, Ajayi equalled his personal best again (-0.7) to win at the 2026 London Diamond League, ahead of Seville. On 28 July, Ajayi ran 9.90 seconds in the 100 metres final in wet conditions to win the bronze medal at the 2026 Commonwealth Games in Glasgow, Scotland. In doing so, he became the first Nigerian male sprinter in 20 years to win a Commonwealth Games 100m medal, after Olusoji Fasuba in 2006. Later at the Games, he won the bronze medal in the men's 4 × 100 m relay. On 23 August, he placed fourth in 9.94 seconds for the 100 m in the Diamond League at the 2026 Kamila Skolimowska Memorial in Silesia, Poland. At the 2026 Diamond League Final in Brussels on 4 September, Ajayi placed third in the 100 metres. On 12 September, he ran 9.94 seconds to place fourth over 100 m at the inaugural World Ultimate Championship in Budapest.

== Personal life ==
He attends Auburn University in the United States.
