= Jelani Watkins =

American sprinter

Personal information
- Nationality: United States

Sport
- Sport: Athletics
- Event: Sprint

Achievements and titles
- Personal best(s): 60m: 6.46 (Fayetteville, 2026); 100m: 10.01 (Jacksonville, 2025); 200m: 20.11 (Fayetteville, 2026)

Jelani Watkins is an American sprinter. He finished third in the 100 metres at the 2025 NCAA Outdoor Championships and second over 60 metres at the 2026 NCAA Indoor Championships, competing for Louisiana State University as a freshman.

== Biography ==
Watkins was born in Louisiana but left the River Parishes area of South Louisiana to be closer to his mother’s family in the Houston area when he was in elementary school. In Texas, he attended Atascocita High School in Humble.

Watkins was timed for the 60 metres in 6.75 seconds at the LSU High School Classic in January 2024. He ran 10.22 seconds for the 100 metres in March 2024 at the Texas A&M Bluebonnet High School Invitational. That month, he anchored the school team to a national high school record time of 38.92 seconds in the 4 x 100 metres relay at the Rice Victor Lopez Classic, where he also ran a wind-legal tine of 10.22 seconds for the 100 metres and 20.75 seconds for the 200 metres. That May, he helped the school win the Class 6A state track championship in Austin with Watkins accounting for 40 of the team's 70 championship points, winning over 100m, 200m and with the sprint relay team. He was named the All-Greater Houston Boys Track and Field Athlete of the Year in both 2023 and 2024.

Watkins joined Louisiana State University as a dual-athlete for track and field and American football. He suffered a foot injury in practice in August 2024 and redshirted his first football season but participated in sprint events on the track in 2025. Running indoors for the LSU track team in 2025, Watkins ran the 60 metres in 6.61 seconds at the New Mexico Collegiate Classic in Albuquerque, New Mexico, the seventh-fastest in school history.

In April 2025, Watkins ran a 10.03 seconds for the 100 metres at the Tom Jones Invitational. It was the sixth-fastest wind-legal time for the 100m in LSU program history. He ran 10.02 seconds for the 100 metres to qualify for the final at the 2025 NCAA Outdoor Championships in Eugene, Oregon. He placed third in the final in 10.10 seconds, given the same time as second placed Max Thomas but 0.03 behind race winner Jordan Anthony.

In January 2026, Watkins transferred to the University of Arkansas. In February, Watkins moved to second on the University of Arkansas all-time indoor list in the 60 metres (6.52 seconds) and the 200 metres (20.43 seconds), at the Tyson Invitational in Fayetteville. He was runner-up to Kayinsola Ajayi in the 60 metres and ran 20.28 seconds to win the 200 metres at the SEC Indoor Championships. Watkins ran a personal best of 6.46 to win his preliminary 60 m heat on 13 March at the 2026 NCAA Indoor Championships. The time was just .01 seconds behind the NCAA record held jointly by Ajayi. In the final, he placed second to Ajayi in 6.48 seconds. He also reached the final of the 200 metres, running 20.10 seconds finishing narrowly behind Garrett Kaalund in his heat, before placing third in the 200 m final in 20.26 seconds.

The following month, he beat Kaalund with a wind-assisted 9.82-second (+2.8) for the 100 metres at the Mt. SAC Relays, California. In May, Watkins won both the 100 m and the 200 m at the SEC Championships, running 9.95 and 19.87 respectively. On 12 June, he placed third in the 100 m final at the 2026 NCAA Outdoor Championships, running a wind-assisted 9.87 seconds.
