= Shenese Walker =

Jamaican sprinter (born 2003)

Personal information
- Born: 23 January 2003 (age 23)

Sport
- Sport: Athletics
- Event: Sprint
- College team: FSU Seminoles

Achievements and titles
- Personal bests: 60m: 7.07 (2026); 100m: 10.80 (2026); 200m: 22.65 (2026)

Shenese Walker (born 23 January 2003) is a Jamaican sprinter. She won the 100 metres title at the 2026 NCAA Championships and the 60 metres title at the 2026 NCAA Indoor Championships in the United States.

== Biography ==
Walker attended Hydel High School in Jamaica, placing second over 200 metres to Tina Clayton in age-group race at the 2020 Central Athletics Championships. She later competed in the United States for Florida State University.

Walker won the 60 metres at the 2024 Atlantic Coast Conference Indoor Championships (ACC) winning the title with a time of 7.20 seconds ahead of Dajaz DeFrand. She also placed third behind DeFrand in the 200 metres at the championships. She placed fifth in the final of the 60 metres at the 2024 NCAA Indoor Championships.

Walker won the 60 metres at the ACC Indoor Championships in March 2025, running 7.21 seconds seconds. She also placed third with a lifetime best of 23.36 seconds in the 200 metres. Walker was a finalist in the 60 metres at the 2025 NCAA Division I Indoor Track and Field Championships, where she ran a personal best of 7.18 seconds and placed seventh overall.

In May 2025, Walker twice ran a personal best in the 100 metres at the NCAA East Championships in Jacksonville, running 11.02 seconds and 10.98 seconds (1.4 m/s). She also won the 200 metres in 22.72 seconds. She placed sixth in the final of the 100 metres at the 2025 NCAA Outdoor Championships.

In January 2026, Walker ran a personal best 7.16 seconds for the 60 metres. Shortly afterwards, Walker ran a Florida State (FSU) and Atlantic Coast (ACC) 60m record of 7.09 seconds at the Razorback Invitational in Fayetteville, Arkansas. She won the 60 metres and 200 metres double at the 2026 ACC Indoor Championships. Competing at the 2026 NCAA Division I Indoor Track and Field Championships, she ran a personal best 7.07 seconds for the 60 metres to lead the qualifiers from the preliminary round, before winning the final the following day in 7.08 seconds ahead of Adeajah Hodge. The following month, she moved to eighth on the Jamaica all-time list for the 100 m with 10.80 seconds (+1.7) in Gainesville, Florida. Walker completed a sprint double with wins over 100 metres and 200 metres in May 2026 at the Atlantic Coast Conference Championships, running a personal best 22.65 for the 200 m. On 13 June, she ran 10.88 seconds to beat the new collegiate record holder Adaejah Hodge in the women's 100 metres final at the 2026 NCAA Outdoor Championships.

== Athletics achievements ==
Information from her World Athletics profile unless otherwise noted.

=== Personal bests ===
Type	Distance	Time (s)	Wind (m/s)	Venue	Date	Notes
Individual events
Indoor	60 metres	7.07	—N/a	Fayetteville, United States	13 March 2026	
Indoor	200 metres sh	22.96	—N/a	Fayetteville, United States	30 January 2026	
Outdoor	100 metres	10.80	+1.7	Gainesville, United States	18 April 2026	
Outdoor	200 metres	22.65	+0.2	Louisville, United States	16 May 2026	
Team events
Outdoor	4 × 100 metres relay	42.72	—N/a	Jacksonville, United States	31 May 2025	
Outdoor	4 × 400 metres relay	3:35.40	—N/a	Tallahassee, United States	28 March 2025	
