= Spec Towns Track =

Athletics stadium in Athens, Georgia

- Interactive map of Spec Towns Track
- Location: 2330 S Milledge Ave, Athens, GA 30605
- Coordinates: 33.910709°N 83.375741°W
- Owner: University of Georgia
- Operator: University of Georgia Athletic Association
- Capacity: 4,000
- Surface: 400-metre, 9-lane track

Construction
- Opened: February 18, 2026
- Cost: $59.8 million

Tenants
- Georgia Bulldogs track and field

Spec Towns Track is the track and field facility for the University of Georgia (UGA) in Athens, Georgia, located on South Milledge Avenue. The complex, which spans 37 acres and includes 34,700 square feet of facilities, was dedicated on February 18, 2026.

The facility is named after Forrest "Spec" Towns, a 1936 Summer Olympics gold medalist and inductee of the U.S. Track & Field and Cross Country Coaches Association Hall of Fame, who competed and coached at Georgia. The track was originally named in his honor in 1990 during the SEC outdoor track and field championships.

The complex features a nine-lane, 400-meter track with an infield dedicated to jumps, one of the premiere throwing areas in the country (including two shot put rings, two discus and hammer throw rings, and four javelin runways), five 100-meter indoor warm-up lanes, six 110-meter outdoor warm-up lanes, and a 110-meter training hill. The grandstand accommodates over 4,000 spectators.

== Former facility ==
The previous Spec Towns Track was located on the southwestern corner of the Butts-Mehre Heritage Hall athletic facilities off Lumpkin Street. Originally built in 1964, the track served as the home for Georgia Bulldogs track and field for approximately 60 years. The grandstand was added in 1987 with a capacity of 1,000 spectators. In 2011, the Bulldogs hosted their first Southeastern Conference Outdoor Track & Field Championships since 1999 at the facility. Following the 2017 season, the track surface was upgraded to a 400-meter, 8-lane Mondo Sportflex Super X720 surface.

== Annual events ==
The University of Georgia hosts the Spec Towns Invitational at the complex each spring.
