= Malachi Snow =

American sprinter (born 2004)

Personal information
- Born: 5 April 2004 (age 22)

Sport
- Sport: Athletics
- Events: Sprint, Hurdles

Achievements and titles
- Personal bests: 100m: 10.04 (2025); 110mH: 13.30 (2025); Indoor; 60m: 6.46 (2026); 60mH: 7.43 (2026)

Malachi Snow (born 5 April 2004) is an American sprinter and sprint hurdler from Cincinnati, who competes for Texas Tech University.

== Biography ==
Snow attended Northwest High School in Cincinnati, Ohio. He helped the school win the Southwest Ohio Conference championship in 2022 and was named SWOC Runner of the Year. He later set a school record when he ran the 110 hurdles in 13.91 seconds to win the Ohio state championships.

A college freshman in 2024, competing for San Jose State University, won the men's 110m hurdles in a wind-legal 13.50 seconds, before later winning the 100m in a wind-legal 10.27 seconds on the same day at the Stanford Invitational at in Palo Alto, California. He placed fourth in the 100m hurdles at the 2024 NCAA Outdoor Championships in 13.33 seconds.

Snow transferred to Texas Tech University ahead of the 2025 indoor track season. He placed third in the 60m hurdles at the 2025 NCAA Indoor Championships, where he was also a finalist in the 60 metres, placing seventh in 6.59 seconds. In May 2025, he ran a personal best 10.04 seconds (+1.1) for the 100 metres.

Snow won the 60m hurdles at the Stan Scott Invite in January 2026, in a time of 7.55 seconds. Snow set a new personal best for the 60 metres at the 2026 Big 12 Indoor Championship of 6.46 seconds, also running a personal best 7.43 in the 60m hurdles at the championships with both finals taking place within 20 minutes of each other. Competing at the 2026 NCAA Division I Indoor Track and Field Championships in March, Snow ran 7.43 seconds the 60 metres hurdles in the preliminary round, also qualifying for the final of the 60 metres with a time of 6.54 seconds. He placed fourth in the 60 m final in 6.57 seconds and ran 7.56 seconds on the same day in the 60 m hurdles final. In May, Snow ran a wind-aided 13.08 (+3.8w) to win the men's 110 m hurdles at the Big 12 Outdoor Championships and later qualified for the 2026 NCAA Outdoor Championships.
