= UCF Knights track and field =

- University: University of Central Florida
- Head coach: Dana Boone (5th season)
- Conference: Big 12
- Location: Orlando, Florida, US
- Outdoor track: UCF Soccer and Track Stadium
- Nickname: UCF Knights
- Colors: Black and gold

Conference Indoor Championships
- 2011, 2013, 2017, 2022, 2023

Conference Outdoor Championships
- 1997, 1998, 2000, 2001, 2002, 2003, 2004, 2005, 2010, 2011, 2012, 2013, 2022, 2023

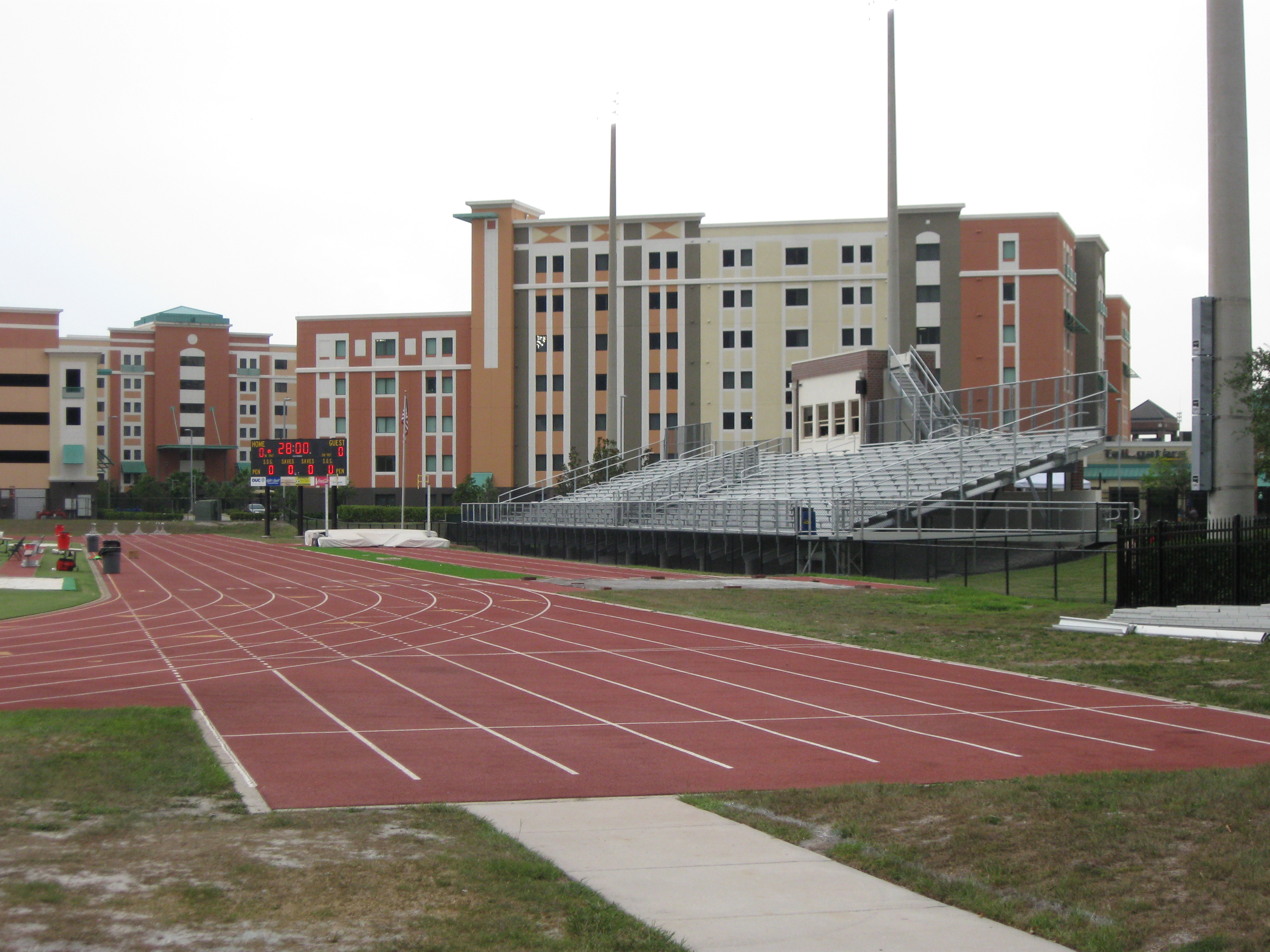
UCF Soccer and Track Stadium

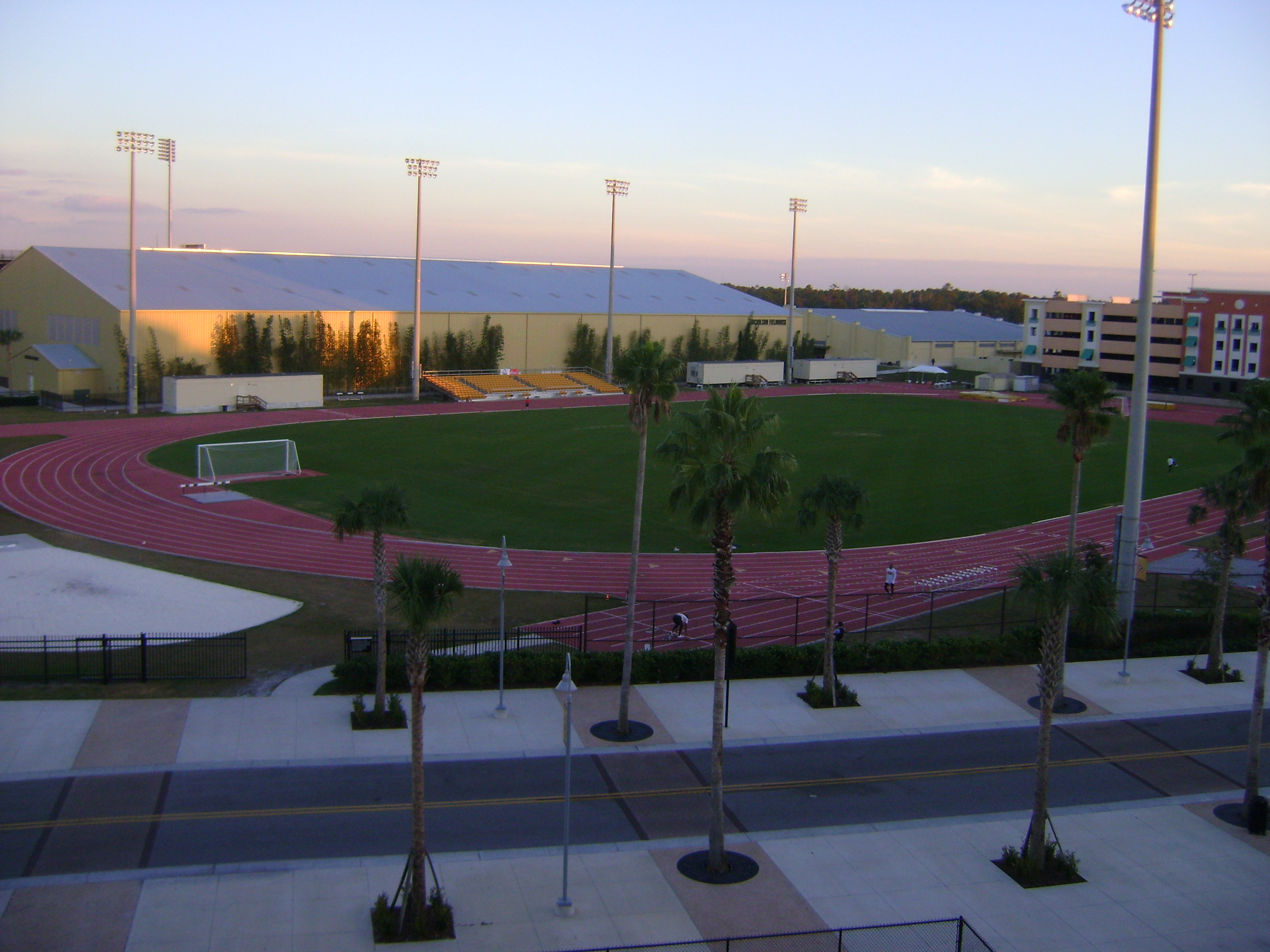
UCF Soccer and Track Stadium

The UCF Knights track and field program represents the University of Central Florida in the sport of women's track and field. The Knights compete in Division I of the National Collegiate Athletic Association (NCAA) and the Big 12 Conference. The program includes intercollegiate indoor and outdoor women's track and field teams. UCF is one of the few schools that has a women's track and field team but no men's team. The Knights host their home outdoor meets at UCF Soccer and Track Stadium, located on the university's main campus in Orlando, Florida. Although they compete in indoor track and field they do not have an on campus indoor track facility. The Knights track team is currently led by head coach Dana Boone.

== History ==
The UCF Knights women's outdoor track and field team was organized in 1984; the indoor track and field team was formed in 2006. The University of Central Florida joined Conference USA in 2005, and the Knights track team began to compete in C-USA in 2006. UCF joined the American Athletic Conference in 2013.

Historically, the Knights have been a force in the C-USA and the Atlantic Sun Conference, which the Knights were members of between 1996 and 2005. The program has won a total of thirteen conference championships. The Knights have won twelve outdoor championships (1997, 1998, 2000, 2001, 2002, 2003, 2004, 2005, 2010, 2011, 2012, 2013), and one indoor championship (2011).

In 2012, the Knights indoor team earned the highest national ranking in program history when they were ranked No. 5 in the U.S. Track & Field and Cross Country Coaches Association national poll.

The team has an on-campus outdoor track (which is also the stadium for the men's and women's soccer teams) called the UCF Soccer and Track Stadium, where they have called home since 1991. They do not have an indoor track facility.

Men's track and field and cross country teams were scheduled to be started during the 1971-72 season. A men's track and field intramural league was active in the 1970s. However, the school has not had a men's track team since the UCF Knights football team started in 1978. In 2016, interest was expressed in adding a men's team, but it was considered a low priority by the administration.

== Coaching staff ==
The Knights' current head coach of the women's track and field teams is Jeanette Bolden. Jeanette Bolden became UCF's head track and field/cross country coach in June 2013 after a magnificent career at UCLA. She was a three-time NCAA championship coach and former United States Olympic coach. After 20 years at UCLA, her alma mater, she joined the UCF coaching staff. Since coming to Orlando, Bolden has led UCF to three consecutive NCAA championship appearances. The program has made the trip to Eugene, Oregon, each of the last eight seasons (Eugene, Oregon is where the NCAA Championship is held). In 2014, 13 of Bolden's student-athletes earned all-conference honors, 11 qualified for the NCAA East Prelims and seven advanced to the NCAA Championships. The following season, in 2015, 11 Knights garnered all-conference honors, 12 qualified for the NCAA East Prelims, and four advanced to the NCAA Championships in Eugene, Ore. Bolden's accomplishments as a collegiate head coach, U.S. Olympic head coach and gold medal-winning U.S. Olympic athlete are unmatched in the world of track and field. As the Bruins' head coach from 1994 to 2013, she led UCLA to three NCAA team championships—the 2004 outdoor and the 2000 and 2001 indoor titles. They were the first national indoor track and field crowns - men's or women's - in school history. A specialist with sprinters and hurdlers, Bolden also mentored four Bruins to six NCAA outdoor individual championships: Nicole Leach (2007/2009, 400H), Monique Henderson (2005, 400M), Sheena Johnson (2003/2004, 400H) and Joanna Hayes (1999, 400H). Since 1994, Bolden has coached more than 50 UCLA All-Americans in the sprints, hurdles, and relays.

Following Knights' 2011 indoor and outdoor track and field championships, Gilbert was named C-USA's outdoor and indoor Coach of the Year, and the South Region Coach of the Year.

The assistant coaches are Jeff Chakouian and American 800 Record holder Johnny Gray. The coach for pole vault is Jim Metzger. Brandon Washington is also with the program as a volunteer coach. The team manager is Stevie Adams.

== NCAA individual event champions ==
UCF track and field athletes have won one NCAA individual event championship.

- 2013 NCAA Division I Indoor Track and Field Championships: Aurieyall Scott – 60-meter dash

== Knights in the Olympics ==
In 2012, Afia Charles became the first UCF track and field Olympian when she represented Antigua and Barbuda at the 2012 Summer Olympics.

- 2012: Afia Charles – 400-meter race

== See also ==
- UCF Knights cross country
- List of University of Central Florida alumni
