= 60 metres =

Track and field sprint race

Athletics 60 metres
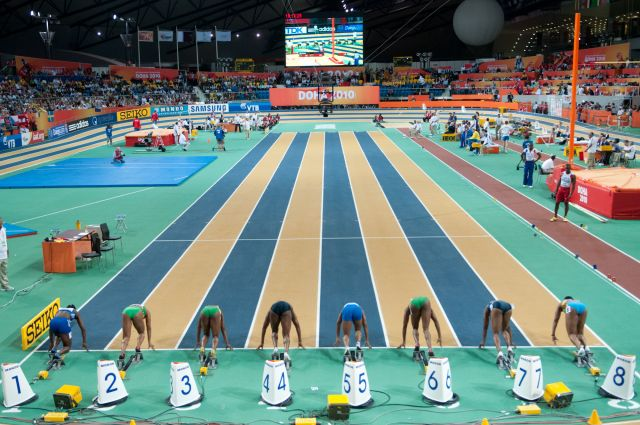
- Women 60 m final during Doha 2010 World Indoor Championships

World records
- Men: (United States) Christian Coleman 6.34 A (2018)
- Women: (Russia) Irina Privalova 6.92 (1993, 1995)

World Indoor Championship records
- Men: (United States) Christian Coleman 6.37 (2018)
- Women: (United States) Gail Devers 6.95 (1993)

60 metres, or 60-meter dash, is a sprint event in track and field. It is a championship event for indoor championships, normally dominated by the best outdoor 100 metres runners. At indoor events, the 60 metres is run on lanes set out in the middle of the 'field', as is the hurdles event over the same distance, thus avoiding some of the effects of the banked track encircling the venue, upon which other track events in indoor events are run. At outdoor venues it is a rare distance, at least for senior athletes. The format of the event is similar to other sprint distances. The sprinters follow three initial instructions: 'on your marks', instructing them to take up position in the starting blocks; 'set', instructing them to adopt a more efficient starting posture, which also isometrically preloads their muscles. This will enable them to start faster. The final instruction is the firing of the starter's pistol. Upon hearing this the sprinters stride forwards from the blocks.

The 60 metres was an Olympic event in the 1900 and 1904 Summer Games but was removed from the schedule thereafter. American Christian Coleman currently holds the men's world record in the 60 metres with a time of 6.34 seconds, while Russian Irina Privalova holds the women's world record at 6.92.

At the 2020 Tokyo Olympics semi-finals, Su Bingtian ran the fastest 60 m split of all-time and the fastest 60 m ever recorded under any conditions with a time of 6.29 seconds.

In the past, it was common for athletes to compete in the 60 yards (54.86 m) race. This is not part of the lineage of the 60 metres, but is the predecessor of the 55 metres race. 60 metres is 65.6168 yards.

== Area records ==
- Indoor results only.
- Updated 1 August 2026.

Area	Men			Women		
Area	Time (s)	Season	Athlete	Time (s)	Season	Athlete
World	6.34 A	2018	Christian Coleman (USA)	6.92	1993	Irina Privalova (RUS)
World	6.34 A	2018	Christian Coleman (USA)	6.92	1995	Irina Privalova (RUS)
Area records
Africa (records)	6.45 A	1999	Leonard Myles-Mills (GHA)	6.97	2018	Murielle Ahouré (CIV)
Africa (records)	6.45	2026	Kanyinsola Ajayi (NGR)	6.97	2018	Murielle Ahouré (CIV)
Asia (records)	6.42	2018	Su Bingtian (CHN)	7.09	1999	Susanthika Jayasinghe (SRI)
Europe (records)	6.41	2022	Marcell Jacobs (ITA)	6.92	1993	Irina Privalova (RUS)
Europe (records)	6.41	2022	Marcell Jacobs (ITA)	6.92	1995	Irina Privalova (RUS)
North, Central America and Caribbean (records)	6.34 A	2018	Christian Coleman (USA)	6.94 A	2023	Aleia Hobbs (USA)
North, Central America and Caribbean (records)	6.34 A	2018	Christian Coleman (USA)	6.94 A	2023	Julien Alfred (LCA)
Oceania (records)	6.52	1999	Matthew Shirvington (AUS)	7.06	2024	Zoe Hobbs (NZL)
South America (records)	6.52	2009	José Carlos Moreira (BRA)	7.09 A	2026	Ana Carolina Azevedo (BRA)

== All-time top 25 ==
Indoor results only

Tables show data for two definitions of "Top 25" - the top 25 60m times and the top 25 athletes:
- denotes top performance for athletes in the top 25 60m times
- denotes lesser performances, still in the top 25 60m times, by repeat athletes
- denotes top performance (only) for other top 25 athletes who fall outside the top 25 60m times

=== Men ===
Updated March 2026.

Ath.#	Perf.#	Time (s)	Athlete	Nation	Date	Place	Ref.
1	1	6.34 A	Christian Coleman	United States	18 February 2018	Albuquerque	
	2	6.37	Coleman #2		19 January 2018	Clemson	
	2	6.37	Coleman #3		3 March 2018	Birmingham	
2	4	6.39	Maurice Greene	United States	3 February 1998	Madrid	
	4	6.39	Greene #2		3 March 2001	Atlanta	
	6	6.40	Greene #3		27 February 1999	Atlanta	
3	6	6.40 A	Ronnie Baker	United States	18 February 2018	Albuquerque	
4	8	6.41	Andre Cason	United States	14 February 1992	Madrid	
	8	6.41	Greene #4		1 February 1998	Stuttgart	
4	8	6.41	Marcell Jacobs	Italy	19 March 2022	Belgrade	
	8	6.41	Coleman #4		19 March 2022	Belgrade	
	8	6.41	Coleman #5		1 March 2024	Glasgow	
4	8	6.41	Jordan Anthony	United States	20 March 2026	Toruń	
	14	6.42	Greene #5		7 March 1999	Maebashi	
7	14	6.42	Dwain Chambers	Great Britain	7 March 2009	Turin	
	14	6.42 A	Coleman #6		18 February 2018	Albuquerque	
7	14	6.42	Su Bingtian	China	3 March 2018	Birmingham	
7	14	6.42	Trayvon Bromell	United States	10 February 2023	Clemson	
	14	6.42	Bromell #2		20 March 2026	Toruń	
	20	6.43	Greene #6		1 February 1998	Stuttgart	
10	20	6.43	Tim Harden	United States	7 March 1999	Maebashi	
	20	6.43	Su #2		6 February 2018	Düsseldorf	
10	20	6.43 A	Noah Lyles	United States	17 February 2024	Albuquerque	
	20	6.43	Coleman #7		1 March 2024	Glasgow	
	20	6.43	Anthony #2		13 February 2026	Fayetteville	
	20	6.43	Anthony #3		20 March 2026	Toruń	
12		6.44	Asafa Powell	Jamaica	18 March 2016	Portland	
12		6.44	Marvin Bracy	United States	19 March 2022	Belgrade	
14		6.45	Bruny Surin	Canada	13 February 1993	Liévin	
14		6.45 A	Leonard Myles-Mills	Ghana	20 February 1999	Colorado Springs	
14		6.45 A	Terrence Trammell	United States	17 February 2001	Pocatello	
14		6.45	Justin Gatlin	United States	1 March 2003	Boston	
14		6.45	Ronald Pognon	France	13 February 2005	Karlsruhe	
14		6.45 A	Trell Kimmons	United States	26 February 2012	Albuquerque	
14		6.45	Terrence Jones	Bahamas	15 January 2022	Lubbock	
14		6.45	Ackeem Blake	Jamaica	4 February 2024	Boston	
14		6.45	Kanyinsola Ajayi	Nigeria	26 February 2026	College Station	
14		6.45	Jeremiah Azu	Great Britain	20 March 2026	Toruń	
14		6.45	Kishane Thompson	Jamaica	20 March 2026	Toruń	
25		6.46	Jon Drummond	United States	1 February 1998	Stuttgart	
25		6.46 A	Marcus Brunson	United States	30 January 1999	Flagstaff	
25		6.46	Jason Gardener	Great Britain	7 March 1999	Maebashi	
25		6.46	Tim Montgomery	United States	11 March 2001	Lisbon	
25		6.46	Leonard Scott	United States	26 February 2005	Liévin	
25		6.46	JC Stevenson	United States	14 March 2025	Virginia Beach	
25		6.46	Malachi Snow	United States	28 February 2026	Lubbock	
25		6.46	Jelani Watkins	United States	13 March 2026	Fayetteville	

Note: The following athletes have had their performances annulled due to doping offences:

Time (s)	Athlete	Nation	Date	Place	Ref.
6.41	Ben Johnson	Canada	7 March 1987	Indianapolis	

==== Outdoor best performances ====
+ = en route to 100 m mark
Equal or superior to 6.34 seconds

Rank	Time (s)	Wind (m/s)	Athlete	Nation	Date	Place	Ref.
1	6.29+ (calculated)	+0.9	Su Bingtian	China	1 August 2021	Tokyo	
2	6.31+ (calculated)	+0.9	Usain Bolt	Jamaica	16 August 2009	Berlin	
3	6.32+ (calculated)	+1.7	Asafa Powell	Jamaica	9 September 2007	Rieti	
3	6.32+ (calculated)	+1.7	Usain Bolt	Jamaica	31 May 2008	New York City	
3	6.32+ (calculated)	±0.0	Usain Bolt	Jamaica	16 August 2008	Beijing	
3	6.32+ (calculated)	+0.2	Asafa Powell	Jamaica	2 September 2009	Lausanne	
3	6.32+ (calculated)	+1.5	Usain Bolt	Jamaica	5 August 2012	London	
3	6.32+ (calculated)	+0.6	Christian Coleman	United States	28 September 2019	Doha	
9	6.33+ (calculated)	−0.2	Maurice Greene	United States	5 August 2001	Edmonton	
9	6.33+ (calculated)	−0.1	Yohan Blake	Jamaica	23 August 2012	Lausanne	
11	6.34+ (calculated)	+0.9	Justin Gatlin	United States	23 August 2015	Beijing	

Note: The following athletes have had their associated 100 m performances annulled due to doping offences:

Time (s)	Wind (m/s)	Athlete	Nation	Date	Place	Ref.
6.33+ (calculated)	+1.1	Ben Johnson	Canada	24 September 1988	Seoul	

=== Women ===
Updated February 2026.

Ath.#	Perf.#	Time (s)	Athlete	Nation	Date	Place	Ref.
1	1	6.92	Irina Privalova	Russia	11 February 1993	Madrid	
	1	6.92	Privalova #2		9 February 1995	Madrid	
	3	6.93	Privalova #3		13 February 1994	Liévin	
	4	6.94	Privalova #4		19 February 1995	Liévin	
2	4	6.94 A	Aleia Hobbs	United States	18 February 2023	Albuquerque	
2	4	6.94 A	Julien Alfred	Saint Lucia	11 March 2023	Albuquerque	
4	6	6.95	Gail Devers	United States	12 March 1993	Toronto	
	6	6.95	Privalova #5		6 February 1994	Vienna	
	6	6.95	Privalova #6		14 February 1995	Moscow	
4	6	6.95	Marion Jones	United States	7 March 1998	Maebashi	
6	10	6.96	Merlene Ottey	Jamaica	14 February 1992	Madrid	
	10	6.96	Privalova #7		11 February 1993	Madrid	
6	10	6.96	Ekaterini Thanou	Greece	7 March 1999	Maebashi	
6	10	6.96	Mujinga Kambundji	Switzerland	18 March 2022	Belgrade	
	10	6.96 A	Alfred #2		10 March 2023	Albuquerque	
	15	6.97	Privalova #8		14 February 1992	Madrid	
	15	6.97	Privalova #9		12 March 1993	Toronto	
	15	6.97	Privalova #10		11 February 1994	Madrid	
	15	6.97	Privalova #11		12 February 1995	Ghent	
	15	6.97	Ottey #2		19 February 1995	Liévin	
	15	6.97	Ottey #3		10 March 1995	Ghent	
9	15	6.97	LaVerne Jones-Ferrette	United States Virgin Islands	6 February 2010	Stuttgart	
9	15	6.97	Murielle Ahouré	Ivory Coast	2 March 2018	Birmingham	
	15	6.97	Alfred #3		25 February 2023	Lubbock	
	24	6.98	Privalova #12		27 February 1993	Moscow	
	24	6.98	Devers #2		21 February 1999	Liévin	
11	24	6.98	Shelly-Ann Fraser-Pryce	Jamaica	9 March 2014	Sopot	
11	24	6.98	Elaine Thompson-Herah	Jamaica	18 February 2017	Birmingham	
	24	6.98	Hobbs #2		28 January 2023	Fayetteville	
11	24	6.98	Ewa Swoboda	Poland	2 March 2024	Glasgow	
	24	6.98	Alfred #4		2 March 2024	Glasgow	
14		6.99	Mikiah Brisco	United States	18 March 2022	Belgrade	
14		6.99	Zaynab Dosso	Italy	22 February 2026	Toruń	
16		7.00	Nelli Cooman	Netherlands	23 February 1986	Madrid	
16		7.00	Veronica Campbell-Brown	Jamaica	14 March 2010	Doha	
16		7.00	Dafne Schippers	Netherlands	13 February 2016	Berlin	
16		7.00	Barbara Pierre	United States	12 March 2016	Portland	
20		7.01	Savatheda Fynes	Bahamas	7 March 1999	Maebashi	
20		7.01	Me'Lisa Barber	United States	10 March 2006	Moscow	
20		7.01	Lauryn Williams	United States	10 March 2006	Moscow	
20		7.01	Patrizia Van der Weken	Luxembourg	22 February 2026	Toruń	
24		7.02	Gwen Torrence	United States	2 February 1996	New York City	
24		7.02	Christy Opara-Thompson	Nigeria	12 February 1997	Ghent	
24		7.02	Chioma Ajunwa	Nigeria	22 February 1998	Liévin	
24		7.02	Philomena Mensah	Canada	7 March 1999	Maebashi	
24		7.02 A	Carmelita Jeter	United States	28 February 2010	Albuquerque	
24		7.02	Tianna Madison	United States	11 February 2012	Fayetteville	
24		7.02 A	Javianne Oliver	United States	18 February 2018	Albuquerque	
24		7.02	Marie Josée Ta Lou	Ivory Coast	20 February 2019	Düsseldorf	
24		7.02	Jacious Sears	United States	8 February 2025	New York City	

==== Outdoor best performances ====
+ = en route to 100 m mark
Equal or superior to 6.92 seconds

Rank	Time (s)	Wind (m/s)	Athlete	Nation	Date	Place	Ref.
1	6.81+ (calculated)	+0.1	Shelly-Ann Fraser-Pryce	Jamaica	29 September 2019	Doha	
2	6.85+ (calculated)	−0.1	Marion Jones	United States	22 August 1999	Seville	
3	6.87+ (calculated)	±0.0 (Note: It is widely believed that the anemometer was faulty for the race in which Florence Griffith Joyner set the official world record for the women's 100 m of 10.49 s. A 1995 report commissioned by the IAAF estimated the true wind speed was between +5.0 m/s and +7.0 m/s, rather than the ±0.0 m/s recorded.)	Florence Griffith Joyner	United States	16 July 1988	Indianapolis	
3	6.87+ (calculated)	+0.9	Elaine Thompson-Herah	Jamaica	21 August 2021	Eugene	
5	6.91+ (calculated)	+0.1	Dina Asher-Smith	Great Britain	29 September 2019	Doha	

== Olympic medalists ==
Games	Gold	Silver	Bronze
1900 Paris	Alvin Kraenzlein (USA)	Walter Tewksbury (USA)	Stan Rowley (AUS)
1904 St. Louis	Archie Hahn (USA)	William Hogenson (USA)	Fay Moulton (USA)

== World Indoor Championships medalists ==
=== Men ===
Games	Gold	Silver	Bronze
1985 Paris ^{a}	Ben Johnson (CAN)	Sam Graddy (USA)	Ronald Desruelles (BEL)
1987 Indianapolis	Lee McRae (USA) ^{b}	Mark Witherspoon (USA)	Pierfrancesco Pavoni (ITA)
1989 Budapest	Andrés Simón (CUB)	John Myles-Mills (GHA)	Pierfrancesco Pavoni (ITA)
1991 Seville	Andre Cason (USA)	Linford Christie (GBR)	Chidi Imo (NGR)
1993 Toronto	Bruny Surin (CAN)	Frankie Fredericks (NAM)	Talal Mansour (QAT)
1995 Barcelona	Bruny Surin (CAN)	Darren Braithwaite (GBR)	Robert Esmie (CAN)
1997 Paris	Haralabos Papadias (GRE)	Michael Green (JAM)	Davidson Ezinwa (NGR)
1999 Maebashi	Maurice Greene (USA)	Tim Harden (USA)	Jason Gardener (GBR)
2001 Lisbon	Tim Harden (USA)	Tim Montgomery (USA)	Mark Lewis-Francis (GBR)
2003 Birmingham	Justin Gatlin (USA)	Kim Collins (SKN)	Jason Gardener (GBR)
2004 Budapest	Jason Gardener (GBR)	Shawn Crawford (USA)	Georgios Theodoridis (GRE)
2006 Moscow	Leonard Scott (USA)	Andrey Epishin (RUS)	Terrence Trammell (USA)
2008 Valencia	Olusoji Fasuba (NGR)	Kim Collins (SKN) Dwain Chambers (GBR)	none awarded
2010 Doha	Dwain Chambers (GBR)	Mike Rodgers (USA)	Daniel Bailey (ATG)
2012 Istanbul	Justin Gatlin (USA)	Nesta Carter (JAM)	Dwain Chambers (GBR)
2014 Sopot	Richard Kilty (GBR)	Marvin Bracy (USA)	Femi Ogunode (QAT)
2016 Portland	Trayvon Bromell (USA)	Asafa Powell (JAM)	Ramon Gittens (BAR)
2018 Birmingham	Christian Coleman (USA)	Su Bingtian (CHN)	Ronnie Baker (USA)
2022 Belgrade	Marcell Jacobs (ITA)	Christian Coleman (USA)	Marvin Bracy (USA)
2024 Glasgow	Christian Coleman (USA)	Noah Lyles (USA)	Ackeem Blake (JAM)
2025 Nanjing	Jeremiah Azu (GBR)	Lachlan Kennedy (AUS)	Akani Simbine (RSA)
2026 Toruń	Jordan Anthony (USA)	Kishane Thompson (JAM)	Trayvon Bromell (USA)

^{a} The event was known as the World Indoor Games in 1985.
^{b} Ben Johnson of Canada originally won the gold medal, but he was disqualified in 1989 after admitting to steroid use between 1981 and 1988.

=== Medal table ===
Rank	Nation	Gold	Silver	Bronze	Total
1	United States (USA)	11	9	4	24
2	Great Britain (GBR)	4	3	4	11
3	Canada (CAN)	3	0	1	4
4	Italy (ITA)	1	0	2	3
4	Nigeria (NGR)	1	0	2	3
6	Greece (GRE)	1	0	1	2
7	Cuba (CUB)	1	0	0	1
8	Jamaica (JAM)	0	4	1	5
9	Saint Kitts and Nevis (SKN)	0	2	0	2
10	Australia (AUS)	0	1	0	1
10	China (CHN)	0	1	0	1
10	Ghana (GHA)	0	1	0	1
10	Namibia (NAM)	0	1	0	1
10	Russia (RUS)	0	1	0	1
15	Qatar (QAT)	0	0	2	2
16	Antigua and Barbuda (ATG)	0	0	1	1
16	Barbados (BAR)	0	0	1	1
16	Belgium (BEL)	0	0	1	1
16	South Africa (RSA)	0	0	1	1
Totals (19 entries)		22	23	21	66

=== Women ===
Games	Gold	Silver	Bronze
1985 Paris ^{a}	Silke Gladisch (GDR)	Heather Oakes (GBR)	Christelle Bulteau (FRA)
1987 Indianapolis	Nelli Fiere-Cooman (NED)	Anelia Nuneva (BUL) ^{b}	Angela Bailey (CAN)
1989 Budapest	Nelli Fiere-Cooman (NED)	Gwen Torrence (USA)	Merlene Ottey (JAM)
1991 Seville	Irina Sergeyeva (URS)	Merlene Ottey (JAM)	Liliana Allen (CUB)
1993 Toronto	Gail Devers (USA)	Irina Privalova (RUS)	Zhanna Tarnopolskaya (UKR)
1995 Barcelona	Merlene Ottey (JAM)	Melanie Paschke (GER)	Carlette Guidry (USA)
1997 Paris	Gail Devers (USA)	Chandra Sturrup (BAH)	Frederique Bangue (FRA)
1999 Maebashi	Ekaterini Thanou (GRE)	Gail Devers (USA)	Philomena Mensah (CAN)
2001 Lisbon	Chandra Sturrup (BAH)	Angela Williams (USA)	Chryste Gaines (USA)
2003 Birmingham	Angela Williams (USA) ^{c}	Torri Edwards (USA)	Merlene Ottey (SLO)
2004 Budapest	Gail Devers (USA)	Kim Gevaert (BEL)	Yulia Nestsiarenka (BLR)
2006 Moscow	Me'Lisa Barber (USA)	Lauryn Williams (USA)	Kim Gevaert (BEL)
2008 Valencia	Angela Williams (USA)	Jeanette Kwakye (GBR)	Tahesia Harrigan (IVB)
2010 Doha	Veronica Campbell-Brown (JAM)	Carmelita Jeter (USA)	Ruddy Zang Milama (GAB)
2012 Istanbul	Veronica Campbell-Brown (JAM)	Murielle Ahouré (CIV)	Tianna Madison (USA)
2014 Sopot	Shelly-Ann Fraser-Pryce (JAM)	Murielle Ahouré (CIV)	Tianna Bartoletta (USA)
2016 Portland	Barbara Pierre (USA)	Dafne Schippers (NED)	Elaine Thompson (JAM)
2018 Birmingham	Murielle Ahouré (CIV)	Marie Josée Ta Lou (CIV)	Mujinga Kambundji (SUI)
2022 Belgrade	Mujinga Kambundji (SUI)	Mikiah Brisco (USA)	Marybeth Sant-Price (USA)
2024 Glasgow	Julien Alfred (LCA)	Ewa Swoboda (POL)	Zaynab Dosso (ITA)
2025 Nanjing	Mujinga Kambundji (SUI)	Zaynab Dosso (ITA)	Patrizia van der Weken (LUX)
2026 Toruń	Zaynab Dosso (ITA)	Jacious Sears (USA)	Julien Alfred (LCA)

^{a} The event was known as the World Indoor Games in 1985.
^{b} Angella Issajenko of Canada originally won the silver medal, but she was disqualified in 1989 after admitting to steroid use between 1982 and 1988.
^{c} Zhanna Block originally won the gold medal, but she was disqualified after her results from November 2002 onwards were deleted in 2011 for long-term drug use.

=== Medal table ===
Rank	Nation	Gold	Silver	Bronze	Total
1	United States (USA)	7	8	5	20
2	Jamaica (JAM)	4	1	2	7
3	Netherlands (NED)	2	1	0	3
4	Switzerland (SUI)	2	0	1	3
5	Ivory Coast (CIV)	1	3	0	4
6	Italy (ITA)	1	1	1	3
7	Bahamas (BAH)	1	1	0	2
8	Saint Lucia (LCA)	1	0	1	2
9	East Germany (GDR)	1	0	0	1
9	Greece (GRE)	1	0	0	1
9	Soviet Union (URS)	1	0	0	1
12	Great Britain (GBR)	0	2	0	2
13	Belgium (BEL)	0	1	1	2
14	Bulgaria (BUL)	0	1	0	1
14	Germany (GER)	0	1	0	1
14	Poland (POL)	0	1	0	1
14	Russia (RUS)	0	1	0	1
18	Canada (CAN)	0	0	2	2
18	France (FRA)	0	0	2	2
20	Belarus (BLR)	0	0	1	1
20	British Virgin Islands (IVB)	0	0	1	1
20	Cuba (CUB)	0	0	1	1
20	Gabon (GAB)	0	0	1	1
20	Luxembourg (LUX)	0	0	1	1
20	Slovenia (SLO)	0	0	1	1
20	Ukraine (UKR)	0	0	1	1
Totals (26 entries)		22	22	22	66

== World leading times ==
Indoor results only

=== Men ===
Year	Time	Athlete	Place
1986	6.54	Steffen Bringmann (GDR)	Sindelfingen
1987	6.50	Lee McRae (USA)	Indianapolis
1988	6.52	Brian Cooper (USA)	Sherbrooke
1988	6.52	Desai Williams (CAN)	Sindelfingen
1989	6.52	Linford Christie (GBR)	Stuttgart
1989	6.52	Andres Simon (CUB)	Budapest
1990	6.51	Linford Christie (GBR)	Athens
1991	6.48	Leroy Burrell (USA)	Madrid
1992	6.41	Andre Cason (USA)	Madrid
1993	6.45	Bruny Surin (CAN)	Liévin
1994	6.48	Linford Christie (GBR)	Karlsruhe
1995	6.46	Bruny Surin (CAN)	Barcelona
1996	6.50	Bruny Surin (CAN)	Karlsruhe
1997	6.49	Michael Green (JAM)	Liévin
1997	6.49	Ato Boldon (TTO)	Birmingham
1997	6.49	Randall Evans (USA)	Atlanta
1998	6.39	Maurice Greene (USA)	Madrid
1999	6.40	Maurice Greene (USA)	Atlanta
2000	6.45	Maurice Greene (USA)	New York City
2001	6.39	Maurice Greene (USA)	Atlanta
2002	6.48	Morné Nagel (RSA)	Dortmund
2002	6.48 A	Marcus Brunson (USA)	Flagstaff
2003	6.45	Justin Gatlin (USA)	Boston
2004	6.46	Jason Gardener (GBR)	Karlsruhe
2005	6.45	Ronald Pognon (FRA)	Karlsruhe
2006	6.50	Leonard Scott (USA)	Moscow
2007	6.46	Marcus Brunson (USA)	Karlsruhe
2008	6.51	Olusoji Fasuba (NGR)	Valencia
2008	6.51	Richard Thompson (TTO)	Fayetteville
2009	6.42	Dwain Chambers (GBR)	Turin
2010	6.48	Dwain Chambers (GBR)	Doha
2011	6.48 A	Mike Rodgers (USA)	Albuquerque
2012	6.45 A	Trell Kimmons (USA)	Albuquerque
2013	6.48	Jimmy Vicaut (FRA)	Gothenburg
2013	6.48	James Dasaolu (GBR)	Gothenburg
2014	6.47	James Dasaolu (GBR)	Birmingham
2015	6.47	Kim Collins (SKN)	Łódź
2016	6.44	Asafa Powell (JAM)	Portland
2016	6.44	Asafa Powell (JAM)	Portland
2017	6.45 A	Ronnie Baker (USA)	Albuquerque
2017	6.45	Christian Coleman (USA)	College Station
2018	6.34 A	Christian Coleman (USA)	Albuquerque
2019	6.47	Su Bingtian (CHN)	Birmingham
2020	6.44	Ronnie Baker (USA)	Liévin
2021	6.47	Marcell Jacobs (ITA)	Toruń
2022	6.41	Marcell Jacobs (ITA)	Belgrade
2022	6.41	Christian Coleman (USA)	Belgrade
2023	6.42	Trayvon Bromell (USA)	Clemson
2024	6.41	Christian Coleman (USA)	Glasgow
2025	6.46	JC Stevenson (USA)	Virginia Beach
2026	6.41	Jordan Anthony (USA)	Toruń

=== Women ===
Year	Time	Athlete	Place
1986	7.00	Nelli Cooman (NED)	Madrid
1987	7.01	Nelli Cooman (NED)	Lievin
1988	7.04	Nelli Cooman (NED)	Budapest
1988	7.04	Silke Moller (GDR)	Budapest
1989	7.05	Nelli Cooman (NED)	Budapest
1990	7.08	Merlene Ottey (JAM)	Madrid
1991	7.02	Irina Privalova (RUS)	Seville
1992	6.96	Merlene Ottey (JAM)	Madrid
1993	6.92	Irina Privalova (RUS)	Madrid
1994	6.93	Irina Privalova (RUS)	Liévin
1995	6.92	Irina Privalova (RUS)	Madrid
1996	7.02	Gwen Torrence (USA)	New York City
1996	7.02	Gwen Torrence (USA)	Fairfax
1996	7.02	Merlene Ottey (JAM)	Liévin
1997	7.00	Gail Devers (USA)	Atlanta
1998	6.95	Marion Jones (USA)	Maebashi
1999	6.96	Ekaterini Thanou (GRE)	Maebashi
2000	7.01	Savatheda Fynes (BAH)	Madrid
2001	7.04	Natalya Safronnikova (BLR)	Minsk
2001	7.04	Petya Pendareva (BUL)	Lisbon
2002	7.06	Chioma Ajunwa (NGR)	Birmingham
2002	7.06	Chioma Ajunwa (NGR)	Birmingham
2003	7.09	Veronica Campbell-Brown (JAM)	Norman
2003	7.09	Muriel Hurtis (FRA)	Liévin
2004	7.06	Yuliya Tabakova (RUS)	Moscow
2005	7.09	Veronica Campbell-Brown (JAM)	Fayetteville
2005	7.09	Angela Daigle-Bowen (USA)	Boston
2006	7.01	Me'Lisa Barber (USA)	Moscow
2006	7.01	Lauryn Williams (USA)	Moscow
2007	7.10	Kim Gevaert (BEL)	Birmingham
2008	7.06	Angela Williams (USA)	Valencia
2009	7.11	Carmelita Jeter (USA)	Birmingham
2010	6.97	LaVerne Jones-Ferrette (ISV)	Stuttgart
2011	7.09	LaKya Brookins (USA)	College Station
2012	7.01	Veronica Campbell-Brown (JAM)	Istanbul
2013	6.99	Murielle Ahouré (CIV)	Birmingham
2014	6.98	Shelly-Ann Fraser-Pryce (JAM)	Sopot
2015	7.05	Murielle Ahouré (CIV)	New York City
2015	7.05	Dafne Schippers (NED)	Prague
2016	7.00	Dafne Schippers (NED)	Berlin
2016	7.00	Barbara Pierre (USA)	Portland
2017	6.98	Elaine Thompson (JAM)	Birmingham
2018	6.97	Murielle Ahouré (CIV)	Birmingham
2019	7.02	Marie Josée Ta Lou (CIV)	Düsseldorf
2020	7.04 A	Javianne Oliver (USA)	Albuquerque
2020	7.04 A	Mikiah Brisco (USA)	Albuquerque
2021	7.03	Ajla Del Ponte (SUI)	Toruń
2022	6.96	Mujinga Kambundji (SUI)	Belgrade
2023	6.94 A	Aleia Hobbs (USA)	Albuquerque
2023	6.94 A	Julien Alfred (LCA)	Albuquerque
2024	6.98	Ewa Swoboda (POL)	Glasgow
2024	6.98	Julien Alfred (LCA)	Glasgow
2025	7.01	Zaynab Dosso (ITA)	Apeldoorn
2026	6.99	Julien Alfred (LCA)	Fayetteville
2026	6.99	Zaynab Dosso (ITA)	Toruń
