= 2026 NCAA Division I Outdoor Track and Field Championships =

College track and field competition

- Dates: June 10–13, 2026
- Host city: Eugene, Oregon; University of Oregon
- Venue: Hayward Field
- Events: 42 (21 men's and 21 women's)

The 2026 NCAA Division I Outdoor Track and Field Championships were the 104th NCAA Division I Men's Outdoor Track and Field Championships and the 44th NCAA Division I Women's Outdoor Track and Field Championships held at Hayward Field in Eugene, Oregon on the campus of the University of Oregon. 42 events (21 men's and 21 women's) were contested from Wednesday, June 10th until Saturday, June 13th, starting with the men's decathlon and ending with the women's 4 × 400-meter relay. Men's events were held on Wednesday and Friday, and women's events were held on Thursday and Saturday, with the exception of the men's decathlon, which extended from Wednesday into Thursday, and the women's heptathlon, which began Friday and ended Saturday.

== Streaming and television coverage ==
ESPN has the rights to the whole event; they aired coverage on ESPN2 ESPNU, and ESPN+.

== Results ==
=== Men ===
==== Men's 100 meters ====
Wind: +2.2 m/s

Placings in the men's 100 meters at the 2026 NCAA Division I Outdoor Track and Field Championships
Rank	Athlete	Nationality	Team	Time	Notes
1st place, gold medalist(s)	Kanyinsola Ajayi	Nigeria	Auburn Tigers	9.72	
2nd place, silver medalist(s)	Jaiden Reid	Cayman Islands	LSU Tigers	9.82	
3rd place, bronze medalist(s)	Jelani Watkins	United States	Arkansas Razorbacks	9.87	
4	Davonte Howell	Cayman Islands	Tennessee Volunteers	9.88	
5	Eddie Osei-Nketia	Australia	USC Trojans	9.95	
6	Mustapha Bokpin	Ghana	Middle Tennessee Blue Raiders	9.99	
7	Mason Lawyer	United States	Arizona Wildcats	10.04	
8	Omari Lewis	Trinidad and Tobago	Auburn Tigers	10.07	
9	Israel Okon	Nigeria	Auburn Tigers	10.12	
				Wind: (+2.2 m/s)	

==== Men's 200 meters ====
Wind: +1.5 m/s

Placings in the men's 200 meters at the 2026 NCAA Division I Outdoor Track and Field Championships
Rank	Athlete	Nationality	Team	Time	Notes
1st place, gold medalist(s)	Jaiden Reid	Cayman Islands	LSU Tigers	19.63	CR
2nd place, silver medalist(s)	Israel Okon	Nigeria	Auburn Tigers	19.92	
3rd place, bronze medalist(s)	Trelee Banks-Rose	United States	Indiana Hoosiers	20.02	PB
4	Mustapha Bokpin	Ghana	Middle Tennessee Blue Raiders	20.04	PB
5	T'Mars McCallum	United States	Tennessee Volunteers	20.09	SB
6	Eddie Osei-Nketia	Australia	USC Trojans	20.19	SB
7	Ian Dossman	United States	Cal State Fullerton Titans	20.24	
8	Jordan Urrutia	United States	Ole Miss Rebels	20.33	
9	Mason Lawyer	United States	Arizona Wildcats	20.34	
				Wind: (+1.5 m/s)	

==== Men's 400 meters ====
Placings in the men's 400 meters at the 2026 NCAA Division I Outdoor Track and Field Championships
Rank	Athlete	Nationality	Team	Time	Notes
1st place, gold medalist(s)	Samuel Ogazi	Nigeria	Alabama Crimson Tide	43.38	CR
2nd place, silver medalist(s)	Jonathan Simms	United States	Georgia Bulldogs	43.92	PB
3rd place, bronze medalist(s)	Sidi Njie	United States	Georgia Bulldogs	44.20	PB
4	Samuel Vessat	France	Purdue Boilermakers	44.47	PB
5	Jordan Pierre	United States	Arkansas Razorbacks	44.49	
6	Justin Braun	United States	Florida Gators	44.79	
7	Jaden Marchan	Trinidad and Tobago	Georgetown Hoyas	44.87	
8	Amal Glasgow	Saint Vincent and the Grenadines	LSU Tigers	45.14	
9	TJ Tomlyanovich	United States	Arkansas Razorbacks	45.84	

==== Men's 800 meters ====
Placings in the men's 800 meters at the 2026 NCAA Division I Outdoor Track and Field Championships
Rank	Athlete	Nationality	Team	Time	Notes
1st place, gold medalist(s)	Colin Sahlman	United States	Northern Arizona Lumberjacks	1:44.22	PB
2nd place, silver medalist(s)	Tyrice Taylor	Jamaica	Arkansas Razorbacks	1:44.30	PB
3rd place, bronze medalist(s)	Rivaldo Marshall	Jamaica	Arkansas Razorbacks	1:44.93	
4	Allon Clay	Japan	Penn State Nittany Lions	1:44.98	
5	Peter Narumbe	Kenya	Texas A&M Aggies	1:45.37	
6	Niko Schultz	Puerto Rico	Penn State Nittany Lions	1:45.50	
7	Miles Brown	United States	Michigan Wolverines	1:45.59	
8	Christian Jackson	United States	Virginia Tech Hokies	1:45.63	SB
9	Camden Law	United States	Michigan Wolverines	1:46.24	

==== Men's 1500 meters ====
Placings in the men's 1500 meters at the 2026 NCAA Division I Outdoor Track and Field Championships
Rank	Athlete	Nationality	Team	Time	Notes
1st place, gold medalist(s)	Simeon Birnbaum	United States	Oregon Ducks	3:36.05	
2nd place, silver medalist(s)	Trent McFarland	United States	Michigan Wolverines	3:37.18	
3rd place, bronze medalist(s)	Gary Martin	United States	Virginia Cavaliers	3:37.21	
4	Connor McCormick	United States	Princeton Tigers	3:37.27	
5	Matan Ivri	Israel	Wisconsin Badgers	3:37.41	PB
6	Elliot Cook	United States	Oregon Ducks	3:37.80	
7	Chris Caudillo	United States	Cal Poly Mustangs	3:38.06	
8	Carter Cutting	United States	BYU Cougars	3:38.10	
9	Tomas Palfrey	Australia	Oregon Ducks	3:38.67	
10	Brendan Herger	United States	Michigan Wolverines	3:38.91	
11	Reuben Reina Jr.	United States	Washington Huskies	3:39.15	
12	Benne Anderson	Germany	Syracuse Orange	3:40.06	

==== Men's 5000 meters ====
Placings in the men's 5000 meters at the 2026 NCAA Division I Outdoor Track and Field Championships
Rank	Athlete	Nationality	Team	Time	Notes
1st place, gold medalist(s)	Habtom Samuel	Eritrea	New Mexico Lobos	13:38.89	
2nd place, silver medalist(s)	Rocky Hansen	United States	Wake Forest Demon Deacons	13:39.91	
3rd place, bronze medalist(s)	Elsingi Kipruto	Kenya	Louisville Cardinals	13:42.58	
4	Marco Langon	United States	Villanova Wildcats	13:42.77	
5	Ernest Cheruiyot	Kenya	Arkansas Razorbacks	13:44.52	
6	Brian Musau	Kenya	Oklahoma State Cowboys	13:47.18	
7	Pierre-Antoine Attiogbe	France	Cornell Big Red	13:47.43	
8	Isaac Hedengren	United States	BYU Cougars	13:48.84	
9	Evans Kurui	Kenya	Washington State Cougars	13:51.49	
10	Robin Kwemoi Bera	Kenya	Iowa State Cyclones	13:51.83	
11	Denis Kipngetich	Kenya	Oklahoma State Cowboys	13:52.05 [.044]	
12	Myles Hogan	United States	Princeton Tigers	13:52.05 [.048]	
13	Cael Grotenhuis	United States	Northern Arizona Lumberjacks	13:57.00	
14	Tayvon Kitchen	United States	BYU Cougars	13:57.42	
15	Will Daley	United States	Virginia Cavaliers	13:59.78	
16	Luke Tewalt	United States	Oregon Ducks	14:01.28	
17	Charlie Ortmans	United States	Harvard Crimson	14:03.17	
18	Ben Shearer	United States	Arkansas Razorbacks	14:05.56	
19	Ethan Edgeworth	United States	Tennessee Volunteers	14:06.32	
20	Gary Martin	United States	Virginia Cavaliers	14:10.63	
21	Justin Wachtel	United States	Virginia Cavaliers	14:14.03	
22	Taha Er Raouy	Morocco	Eastern Kentucky Colonels	14:20.19	
23	Matias Reynaga	Argentina	Georgia Bulldogs	14:22.83	
—	Simeon Birnbaum	United States	Oregon Ducks	DNF	

==== Men's 10000 meters ====
Placings in the men's 10000 meters at the 2026 NCAA Division I Outdoor Track and Field Championships
Rank	Athlete	Nationality	Team	Time	Notes
1st place, gold medalist(s)	Habtom Samuel	Eritrea	New Mexico Lobos	27:51.31	
2nd place, silver medalist(s)	Elsingi Kipruto	Kenya	Louisville Cardinals	27:54.04	
3rd place, bronze medalist(s)	Ernest Cheruiyot	Kenya	Arkansas Razorbacks	27:58.62	
4	Denis Kipngetich	Kenya	Oklahoma State Cowboys	28:02.24	
5	Dismas Lokira Korir	Kenya	Alabama Crimson Tide	28:08.49	
6	Evans Kurui	Kenya	Washington State Cougars	28:10.17	
7	Kelvin Cheruiyot	Kenya	Florida Gators	28:13.36	PB
8	Dennis Kipruto	Kenya	Alabama Crimson Tide	28:16.31	
9	Miguel Baidal	Spain	Eastern Kentucky Colonels	28:17.99	PB
10	William Zegarski	United States	Butler Bulldogs	28:19.38	PB
11	Stephen Masindet Maroro	Kenya	Kansas Jayhawks	28:20.71	
12	Charlie Ortmans	United States	Harvard Crimson	28:21.97	PB
13	Adisu Guadia	Israel	Oklahoma State Cowboys	28:22.86	
14	Evan Jenkins	United States	Washington Huskies	28:30.16	
15	Robin Kwemoi Bera	Kenya	Iowa State Cyclones	28:32.22	
16	Tomer Tarragano	Great Britain	North Carolina Tar Heels	28:34.74	PB
17	Sanele Masondo	South Africa	Iowa State Cyclones	28:35.91	
18	Hudson Hurst	United States	Alabama Crimson Tide	28:41.87	PB
19	Will Anthony	New Zealand	Virginia Cavaliers	28:43.34	
20	Victor Kipkoech	Kenya	Texas Tech Red Raiders	28:43.54	
21	Zouhair Redouane	Morocco	Tennessee Volunteers	28:47.20	
22	Jacob Nenow	United States	Princeton Tigers	28:50.76	
23	Evan Burke	Canada	Oregon Ducks	29:14.90	
24	Evans Kiplagat	Kenya	New Mexico Lobos	29:25.06	

==== Men's 110-meter hurdles ====
In the heats, Ja'Kobe Tharp broke the world record with a time of 12.75 seconds (with a tail wind of 1.0 m/s).

Wind: -0.2 m/s

Placings in the men's 110-meter hurdles at the 2026 NCAA Division I Outdoor Track and Field Championships
Rank	Athlete	Nationality	Team	Time	Notes
1st place, gold medalist(s)	Ja'Kobe Tharp	United States	Auburn Tigers	12.90	
2nd place, silver medalist(s)	Kendrick Smallwood	United States	Texas Longhorns	12.95	PB
3rd place, bronze medalist(s)	Braxton Brann	United States	Ohio State Buckeyes	13.07	PB
4	Jason Holmes-Williamson	United States	North Carolina A&T Aggies	13.16	PB
5	Bradley Franklin	United States	Samford Bulldogs	13.19	
6	Demario Prince	Jamaica	Baylor Bears	13.25	
7	Andre Korbmacher	United States	Florida State Seminoles	13.30	
8	Matthew Sophia	Netherlands	LSU Tigers	13.50	
9	Zach Extine	United States	Arizona Wildcats	13.59	
				Wind: (−0.2 m/s)	

==== Men's 400-meter hurdles ====
Placings in the men's 400-meter hurdles at the 2026 NCAA Division I Outdoor Track and Field Championships
Rank	Athlete	Nationality	Team	Time	Notes
1st place, gold medalist(s)	Vance Nilsson	United States	Florida Gators	48.06	CL
2nd place, silver medalist(s)	Ja'Qualon Scott	United States	Texas A&M Aggies	48.82	
3rd place, bronze medalist(s)	Isaiah Taylor	United States	North Carolina A&T Aggies	49.03	
4	Marc Anthony Ibrahim	Lebanon	Tennessee Volunteers	49.06	
5	Devin Nugent	United States	Auburn Tigers	49.50	
6	Jayden Douglas	United States	TCU Horned Frogs	49.68	
7	Xzaviah Taylor	United States	North Carolina A&T Aggies	49.98	
8	Josiah Johnson	United States	Northern Arizona Lumberjacks	50.56	
9	Kody Blackwood	United States	Texas Longhorns	53.52	

==== Men's 3000-meter steeplechase ====
Placings in the men's 3000-meter steeplechase at the 2026 NCAA Division I Outdoor Track and Field Championships
Rank	Athlete	Nationality	Team	Time	Notes
1st place, gold medalist(s)	Geoffrey Kirwa	Kenya	Louisville Cardinals	8:17.46	
2nd place, silver medalist(s)	Silas Kiptanui	Kenya	Tulane Green Wave	8:18.20	
3rd place, bronze medalist(s)	Kristian Imroth	Great Britain	Eastern Kentucky Colonels	8:20.91	
4	Collins Kiprop Kipngok	Kenya	Kentucky Wildcats	8:22.92	SB
5	Benjamin Balazs	United States	Oregon Ducks	8:23.03	PB
6	Joash Ruto	Kenya	Iowa State Cyclones	8:25.14	SB
7	Brett Gardner	United States	Virginia Cavaliers	8:29.38	
8	Titus Kimaru	Kenya	Texas Tech Red Raiders	8:31.63	
9	Nathan Mountain	United States	Virginia Cavaliers	8:38.01	
10	Bismack Kipchirchir	Kenya	Alabama Crimson Tide	8:39.46	
11	Nathan Davis	United States	Army Black Knights	8:41.41	
12	Louis-Lys Fanucchi	France	North Dakota Fighting Hawks	8:55.74	

==== Men's 4 × 100-meter relay ====
Placings in the men's 4 × 100-meter relay at the 2026 NCAA Division I Outdoor Track and Field Championships
Rank	Team	Time	Notes
1st place, gold medalist(s)	Tennessee Volunteers	37.98	SB WA-L
2nd place, silver medalist(s)	LSU Tigers	38.06	SB
3rd place, bronze medalist(s)	Ohio State Buckeyes	38.44	SB
4	North Carolina A&T Aggies	38.67	
5	Mississippi State Bulldogs	39.07	
—	Oregon Ducks	DNF	
—	Auburn Tigers	DNF	
—	Arkansas Razorbacks	DNF	
—	Houston Cougars	DNF	

==== Men's 4 × 400-meter relay ====
Placings in the men's 4 × 400-meter relay at the 2026 NCAA Division I Outdoor Track and Field Championships
Rank	Team	Time	Notes
1st place, gold medalist(s)	Georgia Bulldogs	2:57.93	CL
2nd place, silver medalist(s)	LSU Tigers	2:57.96	SB
3rd place, bronze medalist(s)	Arkansas Razorbacks	2:59.87	SB
4	Purdue Boilermakers	3:00.56	SB
5	Iowa Hawkeyes	3:00.65	SB
6	North Carolina A&T Aggies	3:00.68	SB
7	Tennessee Volunteers	3:00.74	SB
8	Texas A&M Aggies	3:00.85	
—	Florida Gators	DNF	

==== Men's long jump ====
Placings in the men's long jump at the 2026 NCAA Division I Outdoor Track and Field Championships
Rank	Athlete	Nationality	Team	Mark	Notes
1st place, gold medalist(s)	Tafadzwa Chikomba	Zimbabwe	Kansas State Wildcats	8.37 m (27 ft 5 1/2 in) (−0.7 m/s)	PB
2nd place, silver medalist(s)	Juriad Hughes Jr.	United States	Arkansas Razorbacks	8.25 m (27 ft 3/4 in) (+1.7 m/s)	PB
3rd place, bronze medalist(s)	Uroy Ryan	Saint Vincent and the Grenadines	Kansas State Wildcats	8.04 m (26 ft 4 1/2 in) (+1.2 m/s)	PB
4	Gregory Foster Jr.	United States	Princeton Tigers	8.03 m (26 ft 4 in) (−0.1 m/s)	
5	Markus White	United States	Liberty Flames	7.93 m (26 ft 0 in) (+1.2 m/s)	PB
6	Zaid Latif	Morocco	Texas Tech Red Raiders	7.89 m (25 ft 10 1/2 in) (+1.2 m/s)	
7	Jayden Keys	United States	Georgia Bulldogs	7.88 m (25 ft 10 in) (+1.6 m/s)	SB
8	Charles Godfred	Nigeria	Minnesota Golden Gophers	7.83 m (25 ft 8 1/4 in) (+0.9 m/s)	
9	Quincy Isaac	United States	Michigan Wolverines	7.78 m (25 ft 6 1/4 in) (+0.6 m/s)	
10	Trevor Rogers	United States	California Golden Bears	7.73 m (25 ft 4 1/4 in) (+1.2 m/s)	
11	Temoso Masikane	South Africa	Florida Gators	7.73 m (25 ft 4 1/4 in) (+0.8 m/s)	
12	Jordan Turner	Jamaica	LSU Tigers	7.64 m (25 ft 3/4 in) (+0.9 m/s)	
13	Kingi McNair	United States	Kentucky Wildcats	7.52 m (24 ft 8 in) (+1.0 m/s)	
14	Tyler Nichols	United States	Southern Miss Golden Eagles	7.52 m (24 ft 8 in) (+1.4 m/s)	
15	Curtis Williams	United States	Florida State Seminoles	7.48 m (24 ft 6 1/4 in) (+0.6 m/s)	
16	Roman Kushelov	Russia	Louisville Cardinals	7.45 m (24 ft 5 1/4 in) (+1.4 m/s)	
17	Raekwon Weatherspoon	United States	Boise State Broncos	7.43 m (24 ft 4 1/2 in) (−0.8 m/s)	
18	Steven Evans-Glynn	United States	Long Beach State Beach	7.34 m (24 ft 3/4 in) (+1.6 m/s)	
19	Roy Morris	United States	Northwestern State Demons	7.31 m (23 ft 11 3/4 in) (+0.4 m/s)	
20	Josh Parrish	United States	Wichita State Shockers	7.26 m (23 ft 9 3/4 in) (−0.6 m/s)	
21	Kennedy Stringfellow	United States	Oklahoma Sooners	7.24 m (23 ft 9 in) (+0.9 m/s)	
22	Justin Walker	United States	Alabama A&M Bulldogs	{6.69 m (21 ft 11 1/4 in) (+0.6 m/s)	
—	Croix DaCunha	United States	Kansas State Wildcats	NM	
—	Khybah Dawson	British Virgin Islands	Texas A&M Aggies	NM	

==== Men's triple jump ====
Placings in the men's triple jump at the 2026 NCAA Division I Outdoor Track and Field Championships
Rank	Athlete	Nationality	Team	Mark	Wind (m/s)	Notes
1st place, gold medalist(s)	Selva Prabhu	India	Kansas State Wildcats	16.92 m (55 ft 6 in)	+1.3	SB
2nd place, silver medalist(s)	Kevin Kemboi	Kenya	Oklahoma State Cowboys	16.84 m (55 ft 2 3/4 in)	+1.6	PB
3rd place, bronze medalist(s)	Brandon Green	United States	Oklahoma Sooners	16.78 m (55 ft 1/2 in)	–1.1	
4	Tre Betts	United States	Oregon Ducks	16.56 m (54 ft 3 3/4 in)	+2.3	
5	Jonathan Seremes	France	Texas Tech Red Raiders	16.48 m (54 ft 3/4 in)	+1.9	
6	Jemuel Miller	Barbados	UTSA Roadrunners	16.45 m (53 ft 11 1/2 in)	+1.5	
7	Kelsey Daniel	Trinidad and Tobago	Texas Longhorns	16.44 m (53 ft 11 in)	+1.4	
8	Praise Aniamaka	Canada	Purdue Boilermakers	16.43 m (53 ft 10 3/4 in)	+2.0	
9	Daniel Falode	England	Texas A&M Aggies	16.20 m (53 ft 1 3/4 in)	+0.9	
10	Roman Kuleshov	Russia	Louisville Cardinals	16.05 m (52 ft 7 3/4 in)	+2.0	
11	Antone Smith	Bahamas	Arizona Wildcats	15.99 m (52 ft 5 1/2 in)	+0.7	
12	Apalos Edwards	Jamaica	Kansas State Wildcats	15.99 m (52 ft 5 1/2 in)	+1.4	
13	Viktor Morozov	Estonia	Illinois Fighting Illini	15.98 m (52 ft 5 in)	+0.4	
14	Divine Aniamaka	Canada	Clemson Tigers	15.96 m (52 ft 4 1/4 in)	+0.7	
15	Aaron Antoine	Trinidad and Tobago	Kansas State Wildcats	15.92 m (52 ft 2 3/4 in)	–0.8	
16	Theo Mudzengerere	Zimbabwe	Kentucky Wildcats	15.85 m (52 ft 0 in)	+1.1	
17	Xavier Partee	United States	North Carolina A&T Aggies	15.82 m (51 ft 10 3/4 in)	+1.1	
18	Miller Jones	United States	Louisville Cardinals	15.81 m (51 ft 10 1/4 in)	+1.1	
19	Chidozie Kalu	Nigeria	Purdue Boilermakers	15.60 m (51 ft 2 in)	+1.0	
20	Gilles Ouedraogo	Burkina Faso	Liberty Flames	15.60 m (51 ft 2 in)	+1.4	
21	Jaden Lippett	United States	Florida Gators	15.43 m (50 ft 7 1/4 in)	+1.3	
22	Ryan John	United States	NC State Wolfpack	15.39 m (50 ft 5 3/4 in)	+2.0	
23	Khalil Antoine	United States	Mississippi State Bulldogs	15.21 m (49 ft 10 3/4 in)	+1.1	
–	Kyvon Tatham	United States	Florida State Seminoles	NM		

==== Men's high jump ====
Placings in the men's high jump at the 2026 NCAA Division I Outdoor Track and Field Championships
Rank	Athlete	Nationality	Team	2.11	2.16	2.19	2.22	2.25	2.28	2.32	Mark	Notes
1st place, gold medalist(s)	Kimani Jack	England	Georgia Bulldogs	o	o	o	o	x–	o	xxx	2.28 m (7 ft 5 3/4 in)	
2nd place, silver medalist(s)	Scottie Vines	United States	Arkansas Razorbacks	o	o	o	o	o	xxx		2.25 m (7 ft 4 1/2 in)	
3rd place, bronze medalist(s)	Grant Campbell	United States	Tennessee Volunteers	xxo	o	xo	o	xxo	xxx		2.25 m (7 ft 4 1/2 in)	PB
4	Jordan Wenger	United States	Oral Roberts Golden Eagles	o	xo	xo	xxo	xxo	xxx		2.25 m (7 ft 4 1/2 in)	PB
5	Riyon Rankin	United States	Georgia Bulldogs	o	xo	xo	xo	xxx			2.22 m (7 ft 3 1/4 in)	SB
6	Elias Gerald	United States	USC Trojans	o	xo	xo	xxo	xxx			2.22 m (7 ft 3 1/4 in)	SB
7	Ethan Ruffin	United States	Fairleigh Dickinson Knights	o	o	xo	xxx				2.19 m (7 ft 2 in)	PB
7	Khalil Antoine	United States	Mississippi State Bulldogs	o	o	xo	xxx				2.19 m (7 ft 2 in)	PB
9	Etoro Bassey	United States	Texas A&M Aggies	o	o	xxx					2.16 m (7 ft 1 in)	
9	Aiden Hayes	United States	Texas State Bobcats	o	o	xxx					2.16 m (7 ft 1 in)	
11	Kyren Washington	United States	Oklahoma Sooners	xxo	o	xxx					2.16 m (7 ft 1 in)	
12	Aleksandr Gerasimov	Russia	Nebraska Cornhuskers	o	xxo	xxx					2.16 m (7 ft 1 in)	
12	Tito Alofe	United States	Harvard Crimson	o	xxo	xxx					2.16 m (7 ft 1 in)	
14	Arvesta Troupe	United States	Ole Miss Rebels	xo	xxo	xxx					2.16 m (7 ft 1 in)	
15	Kenyatta Bennett	United States	Kennesaw State Owls	xxo	xxo	xxx					2.16 m (7 ft 1 in)	
16	Yonathan Kapitolnik	Israel	Illinois Fighting Illini	o	xxx						2.11 m (6 ft 11 in)	
16	Gage Voyles	United States	Kennesaw State Owls	o	xxx						2.11 m (6 ft 11 in)	
16	Kampton Kam	Singapore	Penn Quakers	o	xxx						2.11 m (6 ft 11 in)	
16	Osawese Agbonkonkon	United States	Texas Longhorns	o	xxx						2.11 m (6 ft 11 in)	
20	Brion Stephens	United States	Georgia Bulldogs	xo	xxx						2.11 m (6 ft 11 in)	
—	Antrea Mita	Greece	Houston Cougars	xxx							NH	
—	Tyler Hughes	United States	Southern Miss Golden Eagles	xxx							NH	
—	Tshephang Dankuru	South Africa	Texas State Bobcats	xxx							NH	
—	B.J. Jennings	United States	Texas Tech Red Raiders	xxx							NH	

==== Men's pole vault ====
Placings in the men's pole vault at the 2026 NCAA Division I Outdoor Track and Field Championships
Rank	Athlete	Nationality	Team	5.20	5.35	5.50	5.60	5.70	5.75	5.80	5.85	5.90	5.95	Mark	Notes
1st place, gold medalist(s)	Dyson Wicker	United States	Nebraska Cornhuskers	–	–	o	o	xxo	o	o	o	–	r	5.85 m (19 ft 2 1/4 in)	CL
2nd place, silver medalist(s)	Logan Hammer	United States	Utah State Aggies	–	o	xo	xo	xo	o	x–	x–	x		5.75 m (18 ft 10 1/4 in)	PB
3rd place, bronze medalist(s)	Anthony Meacham	United States	Kansas Jayhawks	–	–	o	o	o	x–	x–	x			5.70 m (18 ft 8 1/4 in)	
4	Ismaila Sawaneh	France	Tennessee Volunteers	–	o	xxo	o	xxo	xxx					5.70 m (18 ft 8 1/4 in)	
5	Matthew Gray	United States	Appalachian State Mountaineers	–	–	xo	o	xxx						5.60 m (18 ft 4 1/4 in)	
6	Maddox Hamm	United States	Virginia Tech Hokies	–	o	o	xo	xxx						5.60 m (18 ft 4 1/4 in)	PB
7	Conner McClure	United States	Virginia Tech Hokies	–	xo	xo	xo	xxx						5.60 m (18 ft 4 1/4 in)	
8	Tyler Carrel	United States	Indiana Hoosiers	xo	xo	xo	xo	xxx						5.60 m (18 ft 4 1/4 in)	
9	James Rhoads	United States	Washington Huskies	–	xxo	o	xxo	xxx						5.60 m (18 ft 4 1/4 in)	
10	Cody Johnston	United States	Illinois Fighting Illini	–	xo	o	xxx							5.50 m (18 ft 1/2 in)	
10	Caelan Harland	United States	South Dakota Coyotes	o	xo	o	xxx							5.50 m (18 ft 1/2 in)	
10	Ricardo Montes de Oca	Venezuela	High Point Panthers	–	xo	o	xxx							5.50 m (18 ft 1/2 in)	
13	Aleksandr Solovyov	Russia	Texas A&M Aggies	–	xxo	xxo	x–	xx						5.50 m (18 ft 1/2 in)	
14	Blake Sifferlin	United States	Tennessee Volunteers	o	o	xxx								5.35 m (17 ft 6 1/2 in)	
14	Logan Kelley	United States	Ole Miss Rebels	o	o	xxx								5.35 m (17 ft 6 1/2 in)	
16	Jackson Bragg	United States	Texas Tech Red Raiders	xo	o	xxx								5.35 m (17 ft 6 1/2 in)	
17	Jason Olivera Jr.	United States	High Point Panthers	o	xo	xxx								5.35 m (17 ft 6 1/2 in)	
18	Ty McPhail	United States	Louisville Cardinals	xxo	xo	xxx								5.35 m (17 ft 6 1/2 in)	=PB
19	Ben Feyrer	United States	Cal Poly Mustangs	o	xxo	xxx								5.35 m (17 ft 6 1/2 in)	
19	Brian Schloeder	United States	Navy Midshipmen	o	xxo	xxx								5.35 m (17 ft 6 1/2 in)	
21	Kevin Swindler	United States	Montana Grizzlies	xo	xxo	xxx								5.35 m (17 ft 6 1/2 in)	
22	Colton Rhodes	United States	Oklahoma Sooners	xxo	xxo	xxx								5.35 m (17 ft 6 1/2 in)	
22	Sam Crenshaw	United States	Western Kentucky Hilltoppers	xxo	xxo	xxx								5.35 m (17 ft 6 1/2 in)	=PB
24	Sullivan Gleason	United States	Southeast Missouri State Redhawks	o	xxx									5.20 m (17 ft 1/2 in)	

==== Men's shot put ====
Placings in the men's shot put at the 2026 NCAA Division I Outdoor Track and Field Championships
Rank	Athlete	Nationality	Team	1	2	3	4	5	6	Mark	Notes
1st place, gold medalist(s)	Ben Smith	United States	Oregon Ducks	19.52	x	21.04	19.52	19.96	x	21.04 m (69 ft 1/4 in)	CL
2nd place, silver medalist(s)	JL van Rensburg	South Africa	Tennessee Volunteers	19.36	20.28	20.33	19.81	19.73	20.29	20.33 m (66 ft 8 1/4 in)	PB
3rd place, bronze medalist(s)	Cade Moran	United States	Nebraska Cornhuskers	18.46	19.58	x	19.36	20.07	20.21	20.21 m (66 ft 3 1/2 in)	=PB
4	Kobe Lawrence	Jamaica	Oregon Ducks	19.42	x	x	19.87	x	x	19.87 m (65 ft 2 1/4 in)	SB
5	Hencu Lamberts	South Africa	Nebraska Cornhuskers	19.27	19.52	19.32	x	19.51	19.71	19.71 m (64 ft 7 3/4 in)	
6	Ryan Henry	United States	Penn State Nittany Lions	18.57	18.81	19.30	18.79	19.65	x	19.65 m (64 ft 5 1/2 in)	PB
7	Xaver Hastenrath	Germany	UCLA Bruins	x	19.24	x	x	x	18.97	19.24 m (63 ft 1 1/4 in)	
8	Jacob Cookinham	United States	Illinois Fighting Illini	19.17	19.08	12.81	18.10	x	18.77	19.17 m (62 ft 10 1/2 in)	
9	Jarno van Daalen	Netherlands	Florida Gators	19.00	19.11	19.16	x	19.03	x	19.16 m (62 ft 10 1/4 in)	
10	Dillon Morlock	United States	Michigan State Spartans	18.50	19.01	x				19.01 m (62 ft 4 1/4 in)	
11	Tyler Michelini	United States	Arizona Wildcats	18.88	18.55	18.34				18.88 m (61 ft 11 1/4 in)	
12	Ethan Elliott	United States	Drake Bulldogs	15.67	18.74	x				18.74 m (61 ft 5 3/4 in)	
13	Menachem Chen	Israel	Arkansas State Red Wolves	16.45	17.85	18.72				18.72 m (61 ft 5 in)	
14	Seamus Malaski	United States	Purdue Boilermakers	18.67	x	18.22				18.67 m (61 ft 3 in)	
15	Grayson Brashear	United States	Kentucky Wildcats	x	18.24	18.26				18.26 m (59 ft 10 3/4 in)	
16	Wade Shomper	United States	Bucknell Bison	18.25	18.13	x				18.25 m (59 ft 10 1/2 in)	
17	Omar Hussein	United States	Arkansas State Red Wolves	18.05	x	18.25				18.25 m (59 ft 10 1/2 in)	
18	Obiora Okeke	United States	Notre Dame Fighting Irish	17.38	18.01	18.16				18.16 m (59 ft 6 3/4 in)	
19	Quentin Peterson	United States	Gardner–Webb Runnin' Bulldogs	17.61	x	18.16				18.16 m (59 ft 6 3/4 in)	
20	Shaiquan Dunn	Jamaica	Texas Longhorns	17.26	17.99	x				17.99 m (59 ft 1/4 in)	
21	Cordell Nwokeji	United States	Houston Cougars	x	17.69	x				17.69 m (58 ft 1/4 in)	
22	Dylan Lambrecht	United States	Penn State Nittany Lions	17.33	x	x				17.33 m (56 ft 10 1/4 in)	
23	Emeka Ugwu	Nigeria	Pittsburgh Panthers	x	17.29	16.04				17.29 m (56 ft 8 1/2 in)	
–	Colby Morlock	United States	Michigan State Spartans	x	x	—				NM	

==== Men's discus throw ====
Placings in the men's discus throw at the 2026 NCAA Division I Outdoor Track and Field Championships
Rank	Athlete	Nationality	Team	1	2	3	4	5	6	Mark	Notes
1st place, gold medalist(s)	Ralford Mullings	Jamaica	Oklahoma Sooners	63.39	X	63.16	65.81	X	62.44	65.81 m (215 ft 10 3/4 in)	
2nd place, silver medalist(s)	Racquil Broderick	Jamaica	USC Trojans	60.59	61.42	62.63	63.21	62.64	64.15	64.15 m (210 ft 5 1/2 in)	PB
3rd place, bronze medalist(s)	Vincent Ugwoke	Nigeria	USC Trojans	63.37	62.63	61.49	63.89	61.29	X	63.89 m (209 ft 7 1/4 in)	PB
4	Texas Tanner	United States	Air Force Falcons	X	63.75	59.25	61.50	63.20	61.46	63.75 m (209 ft 1 3/4 in)	
5	Christopher Young	Jamaica	Alabama Crimson Tide	60.37	62.30	61.99	61.85	60.21	X	62.30 m (204 ft 4 3/4 in)	PB
6	Shamar Reid	Jamaica	Florida State Seminoles	62.30	X	60.87	60.58	X	60.63	62.30 m (204 ft 4 3/4 in)	
7	Christopher Crawford	Trinidad and Tobago	Alabama Crimson Tide	58.50	61.96	59.28	X	X	X	61.96 m (203 ft 3 1/4 in)	PB
8	Mico Lampinen	Finland	USC Trojans	56.07	59.91	61.89	59.30	X	X	61.89 m (203 ft 1/2 in)	PB
9	Kevin Grubbs	United States	Mississippi State Bulldogs	59.54	58.57	61.71	58.65	58.46	60.05	61.71 m (202 ft 5 1/2 in)	PB
10	Christian Hicks	United States	Liberty Flames	59.28	60.09	55.47				60.09 m (197 ft 1 1/2 in)	PB
11	Oluwatimi Williams	United States	North Texas Mean Green	55.98	X	59.90				59.90 m (196 ft 6 1/4 in)	
12	Axel Tirado-Sanchez	United States	Idaho State Bengals	59.21	56.94	X				59.21 m (194 ft 3 in)	
13	Jarno van Daalen	Netherlands	Florida Gators	56.16	X	58.91				58.91 m (193 ft 3 1/4 in)	
14	Trevor Gunzell	Jamaica	Alabama Crimson Tide	X	58.00	58.90				58.90 m (193 ft 2 3/4 in)	
15	Seth Allen	United States	Auburn Tigers	53.30	54.50	58.83				58.83 m (193 ft 0 in)	
16	Sam Hala'ufia	United States	Arizona Wildcats	58.62	57.08	57.76				58.62 m (192 ft 3 3/4 in)	PB
17	Aron Alvarez Aranda	South Africa	Tennessee Volunteers	55.14	56.90	58.36				58.36 m (191 ft 5 1/2 in)	
18	Iosif Papa	Cyprus	UMBC Retrievers	55.21	58.28	X				58.28 m (191 ft 2 1/4 in)	
19	Cort Gebbers	United States	Eastern Washington Eagles	57.52	57.40	X				57.52 m (188 ft 8 1/2 in)	PB
20	Kyriaun Davis	United States	Cal State Northridge Matadors	56.17	X	57.26				57.26 m (187 ft 10 1/4 in)	
21	Bryce Ruland	United States	Iowa Hawkeyes	X	57.22	54.94				57.22 m (187 ft 8 3/4 in)	
22	Ben Smith	United States	Oregon Ducks	55.37	X	56.17				56.17 m (184 ft 3 1/4 in)	
23	Kai Twaddle-Dunham	United States	Auburn Tigers	X	55.48	53.94				55.48 m (182 ft 1/4 in)	
24	Chad Hendricks	Jamaica	LSU Tigers	53.13	X	55.40				55.40 m (181 ft 9 in)	

==== Men's javelin throw ====
Placings in the men's javelin throw at the 2026 NCAA Division I Outdoor Track and Field Championships
Rank	Athlete	Nationality	Team	1	2	3	4	5	6	Mark	Notes
1st place, gold medalist(s)	Nnamdi Prosper Chinecherem	Nigeria	Texas A&M Aggies	82.26	81.19	X	75.68	78.79	77.30	82.26 m (269 ft 10 1/2 in)	
2nd place, silver medalist(s)	Keyshawn Strachan	Bahamas	Nebraska Cornhuskers	80.65	X	X	X	74.56	X	80.65 m (264 ft 7 in)	
3rd place, bronze medalist(s)	Jack Larriviere	United States	LSU Tigers	72.44'	71.21	76.00	71.01	75.93	77.91	77.91 m (255 ft 7 1/4 in)	
4	Jordan Davis	United States	Georgia Bulldogs	77.64	74.50	77.70	X	77.83	X	77.83 m (255 ft 4 in)	
5	Nick Reynolds	United States	Georgia Bulldogs	77.43	74.49	71.89	74.06	X	X	77.43 m (254 ft 1/4 in)	
6	Leikel Cabrera Gay	Cuba	Florida Gators	68.98	68.43	75.51	76.07	73.80	75.30	76.07 m (249 ft 6 3/4 in)	
7	Pat Vialva	United States	Oregon Ducks	74.76	72.36	72.25	69.12	72.10	75.04	75.04 m (246 ft 2 1/4 in)	
8	Daniel Thrana	Norway	Oregon Ducks	72.42	73.26	X	74.90	71.56	72.99	74.90 m (245 ft 8 3/4 in)	
9	Ben Shughart	United States	Liberty Flames	70.47	73.92	70.06	70.08	72.49	71.20	73.92 m (242 ft 6 in)	
10	Tom Teršek	Slovenia	USC Trojans	68.35	72.48	73.24				73.24 m (240 ft 3 1/4 in)	
11	Reuben Booysen	South Africa	South Alabama Jaguars	69.47	70.85	73.10				73.10 m (239 ft 9 3/4 in)	PB
12	Sam Hankins	United States	Texas A&M Aggies	70.17	72.58	69.28				72.58 m (238 ft 1 1/4 in)	
13	Augustus Henry	United States	Cincinnati Bearcats	72.22	65.44	70.34				72.22 m (236 ft 11 1/4 in)	
14	Blake Sturgis	United States	Idaho Vandals	70.59	67.54	65.66				70.59 m (231 ft 7 in)	
15	Riley Marx	United States	Kansas State Wildcats	68.06	70.43	64.63				70.43 m (231 ft 3/4 in)	
16	Walker Deede	United States	Utah State Aggies	62.69	X	69.60'				69.60 m (228 ft 4 in)	
17	Brandon Falconer	Jamaica	Mount St. Mary's Mountaineers	58.44	68.51	69.33				69.33 m (227 ft 5 1/2 in)	PB
18	Tuomas Närhi	Finland	Mississippi State Bulldogs	68.25	66.27	67.55				68.25 m (223 ft 11 in)	
19	Kaden Cartwright	Bahamas	Mississippi State Bulldogs	68.02	67.21	X				68.02 m (223 ft 1 3/4 in)	
20	Jack Greaves	Australia	Rice Owls	68.02	65.74	66.02				68.02 m (223 ft 1 3/4 in)	
21	Evan Niedrowski	United States	Monmouth Hawks	67.72	67.75	X				67.75 m (222 ft 3 1/4 in)	
22	Ty Hampton	United States	Rice Owls	66.19	66.33	X				66.33 m (217 ft 7 1/4 in)	
23	Owen Faulha	United States	Boston University Terriers	58.66	65.20	63.24				65.20 m (213 ft 10 3/4 in)	
24	Jemar Ferguson	Jamaica	Louisiana Ragin' Cajuns	61.51	X	X				61.51 m (201 ft 9 1/2 in)	

==== Men's hammer throw ====
Placings in the men's hammer throw at the 2026 NCAA Division I Outdoor Track and Field Championships
Rank	Athlete	Nationality	Team	1	2	3	4	5	6	Mark	Notes
1st place, gold medalist(s)	Angelos Mantzouranis	Greece	Minnesota Golden Gophers	X	68.63	74.04	75.31	75.78	X	75.78 m (248 ft 7 1/4 in)	
2nd place, silver medalist(s)	Texas Tanner	United States	Air Force Falcons	67.90	71.30	73.94	X	75.45	74.78	75.45 m (247 ft 6 1/4 in)	
3rd place, bronze medalist(s)	Ryan Johnson	United States	Iowa Hawkeyes	69.17	73.63	74.40	70.71	73.24	71.16	74.40 m (244 ft 1 in)	
4	Jeremiah Nubbe	United States	Virginia Cavaliers	71.16	71.32	72.52	71.90	70.72	70.79	72.52 m (237 ft 11 in)	
5	Travis Martin	United States	Cal Poly Mustangs	68.92	69.78	70.58	70.27	72.07	72.46	72.46 m (237 ft 8 3/4 in)	
6	Anthony Barmes	New Zealand	Minnesota Golden Gophers	70.27	71.91	70.30	70.88	X	70.85	71.91 m (235 ft 11 in)	
7	Max Lampinen	Finland	USC Trojans	67.80	68.50	69.70	X	70.00	71.64	71.64 m (235 ft 1/4 in)	PB
8	Igor Olaru	Moldova	Tennessee Volunteers	68.79	69.32	71.11	70.17	69.80	70.62	71.11 m (233 ft 3 1/2 in)	
9	Alex Bernstein	Great Britain	DePaul Blue Demons	68.70	69.79	X	69.30	70.71	69.22	70.71 m (231 ft 11 3/4 in)	
10	Nikolaos Polychroniou	Greece	Virginia Cavaliers	68.47	68.77	69.48				69.48 m (227 ft 11 1/4 in)	PB
11	Mico Lampinen	Finland	USC Trojans	67.93	68.78	X				68.78 m (225 ft 7 3/4 in)	
12	Gary Moore Jr.	United States	Kansas State Wildcats	67.34	68.61	66.94				68.61 m (225 ft 1 in)	PB
13	Collin Burkhart	United States	Penn State Nittany Lions	65.56	67.82	67.55				67.82 m (222 ft 6 in)	PB
14	Juha Närhi	Finland	Mississippi State Bulldogs	64.63	63.66	66.48				66.48 m (218 ft 1 1/4 in)	=PB
15	Henry Zimmerman	United States	Texas A&M Aggies	66.30	66.46	X				66.46 m (218 ft 1/2 in)	
16	Seamus Malaski	United States	Purdue Boilermakers	66.19	63.98	63.82				66.19 m (217 ft 1 3/4 in)	
17	Cale Ayers	United States	Virginia Cavaliers	65.93	64.13	X				65.93 m (216 ft 3 1/2 in)	
18	Basel Abosina	Egypt	Florida Gators	62.19	X	65.75				65.75 m (215 ft 8 1/2 in)	
19	Xavier Griffiths	United States	Michigan State Spartans	64.88	X	62.48				64.88 m (212 ft 10 1/4 in)	
20	Christian Toro	United States	Duke Blue Devils	X	64.28	X				64.28 m (210 ft 10 1/2 in)	
21	Pavlos Tzamtzis	Greece	Minnesota Golden Gophers	64.19	X	64.01				64.19 m (210 ft 7 in)	
22	Orry Willems	Belgium	Cincinnati Bearcats	X	61.56	63.35				63.35 m (207 ft 10 in)	
23	Sam Innes	United States	Missouri Tigers	X	X	63.01				63.01 m (206 ft 8 1/2 in)	
—	Francisco Calhau	Portugal	Louisiana-Monroe Warhawks	X	X	X				NM	

==== Men's decathlon ====
Placings in the men's decathlon at the 2026 NCAA Division I Outdoor Track and Field Championships
Rank	Athlete	Nationality	Team	Overall points	100 m	LJ	SP	HJ	400 m	110 m H	DT	PV	JT	1500 m	Notes
1st place, gold medalist(s)	Ben Barton	United States	BYU Cougars	8169	940; 10.65	910; 7.40 m (24 ft 3 1/4 in)	693; 13.43 m (44 ft 1/2 in)	925; 2.13 m (6 ft 11 3/4 in)	946; 47.25	949; 14.20	708; 42.15 m (138 ft 3 1/4 in)	705; 4.31 m (14 ft 1 1/2 in)	665; 55.15 m (180 ft 11 1/4 in)	728; 4:32.61	PB; CL
2nd place, silver medalist(s)	KJ Byrd	United States	Louisville Cardinals	8160	908; 10.79	886; 7.30 m (23 ft 11 1/4 in)	709; 13.68 m (44 ft 10 1/2 in)	925; 2.13 m (6 ft 11 3/4 in)	828; 49.72	918; 14.44	712; 42.33 m (138 ft 10 1/2 in)	1039; 5.41 m (17 ft 8 3/4 in)	566; 48.48 m (159 ft 1/2 in)	669; 4:41.73	PB
3rd place, bronze medalist(s)	Luuk Pelkmans	Netherlands	Illinois Fighting Illini	8079	823; 11.17	874; 7.25 m (23 ft 9 1/4 in)	825; 15.57 m (51 ft 3/4 in)	840; 2.04 m (6 ft 8 1/4 in)	856; 49.12	887; 14.69	631; 38.36 m (125 ft 10 in)	852; 4.81 m (15 ft 9 1/4 in)	702; 57.60 m (188 ft 11 1/2 in)	789; 4:23.32	PB
4	Ryan Gregory	United States	Long Beach State Beach	8001	912; 10.77	862; 7.20 m (23 ft 7 1/4 in)	626; 12.33 m (40 ft 5 1/4 in)	758; 1.95 m (6 ft 4 3/4 in)	849; 49.25	917; 14.45	726; 43.02 m (141 ft 1 1/2 in)	852; 4.81 m (15 ft 9 1/4 in)	678; 55.98 m (183 ft 7 3/4 in)	821; 4:18.57	PB
5	Emil Uhlin	Sweden	Kansas State Wildcats	7976	852; 11.04	734; 6.66 m (21 ft 10 in)	720; 13.86 m (45 ft 5 1/2 in)	840; 2.04 m (6 ft 8 1/4 in)	863; 48.96	886; 14.70	799; 46.56 m (152 ft 9 in)	852; 4.81 m (15 ft 9 1/4 in)	620; 52.13 m (171 ft 1/4 in)	810; 4:20.20	PB
6	Carter Morton	United States	Northern Iowa Panthers	7972	821; 11.18	915; 7.42 m (24 ft 4 in)	709; 13.68 m (44 ft 10 1/2 in)	896; 2.10 m (6 ft 10 1/2 in)	821; 49.87	885; 14.71	608; 37.20 m (122 ft 1/2 in)	883; 4.91 m (16 ft 1 1/4 in)	730; 59.49 m (195 ft 2 in)	704; 4:36.28	PB
7	Edgar Campre	Portugal	Miami Hurricanes	7870	931; 10.69	878; 7.27 m (23 ft 10 in)	815; 15.41 m (50 ft 6 1/2 in)	679; 1.86 m (6 ft 1 in)	825; 49.77	916; 14.46	761; 44.71 m (146 ft 8 in)	822; 4.71 m (15 ft 5 1/4 in)	659; 54.72 m (179 ft 6 1/4 in)	584; 4:55.75	PB
8	Josh Mooney	United States	UConn Huskies	7869	881; 10.91	757; 6.76 m (22 ft 2 in)	677; 13.16 m (43 ft 2 in)	705; 1.89 m (6 ft 2 1/4 in)	827; 49.74	949; 14.20	767; 45.00 m (147 ft 7 1/2 in)	883; 4.91 m (16 ft 1 1/4 in)	738; 60.04 m (196 ft 11 3/4 in)	685; 4:39.30	
9	Cole Wilson	Canada	High Point Panthers	7855	836; 11.11	821; 7.03 m (23 ft 3/4 in)	771; 14.69 m (48 ft 2 1/4 in)	758; 1.95 m (6 ft 4 3/4 in)	827; 49.74	882; 14.73	760; 44.65 m (146 ft 5 3/4 in)	822; 4.71 m (15 ft 5 1/4 in)	643; 53.66 m (176 ft 1/2 in)	735; 4:31.47	PB
10	Dorian Charles	Trinidad and Tobago	Kansas State Wildcats	7764	861; 11.00	809; 6.98 m (22 ft 10 3/4 in)	683; 13.26 m (43 ft 6 in)	679; 1.86 m (6 ft 1 in)	849; 49.25	927; 14.37	714; 42.41 m (139 ft 1 1/2 in)	705; 4.31 m (14 ft 1 1/2 in)	834; 66.35 m (217 ft 8 in)	703; 4:36.38	PB
11	Maximus Tucker	United States	Georgia Bulldogs	7727	876; 10.93	814; 7.00 m (22 ft 11 1/2 in)	775; 14.76 m (48 ft 5 in)	813; 2.01 m (6 ft 7 in)	926; 47.66	754; 15.81	605; 37.05 m (121 ft 6 1/2 in)	676; 4.21 m (13 ft 9 1/2 in)	587; 49.86 m (163 ft 6 3/4 in)	901; 4:07.25	
12	Michael Bennett	United States	Duke Blue Devils	7494	894; 10.85	795; 6.92 m (22 ft 8 1/4 in)	685; 13.29 m (43 ft 7 in)	602; 1.77 m (5 ft 9 1/2 in)	943; 47.31	874; 14.80	672; 40.37 m (132 ft 5 1/4 in)	763; 4.51 m (14 ft 9 1/2 in)	528; 45.92 m (150 ft 7 3/4 in)	738; 4:30.97	
13	Steven Schmidt	United States	Oklahoma State Cowboys	7479	804; 11.26	838; 7.10 m (23 ft 3 1/2 in)	695; 13.46 m (44 ft 1 3/4 in)	840; 2.04 m (6 ft 8 1/4 in)	675; 53.16	827; 15.19	676; 40.54 m (133 ft 0 in)	852; 4.81 m (15 ft 9 1/4 in)	698; 57.35 m (188 ft 1 3/4 in)	574; 4:57.53	
14	Zach McGlynn	United States	North Dakota State Bison	7430	825; 11.16	823; 7.04 m (23 ft 1 in)	664; 12.94 m (42 ft 5 1/4 in)	840; 2.04 m (6 ft 8 1/4 in)	808; 50.15	900; 14.59	617; 37.67 m (123 ft 7 in)	852; 4.81 m (15 ft 9 1/4 in)	443; 40.03 m (131 ft 3 3/4 in)	658; 4:43.63	
15	Blake Harris	United States	Texas A&M Aggies	7407	883; 10.90	716; 6.58 m (21 ft 7 in)	673; 13.10 m (42 ft 11 1/2 in)	679; 1.86 m (6 ft 1 in)	828; 49.71	964; 14.08	670; 40.25 m (132 ft 1/2 in)	705; 4.31 m (14 ft 1 1/2 in)	712; 58.31 m (191 ft 3 1/2 in)	577; 4:57.06	
16	Easton Hammond	United States	Texas State Bobcats	7360	806; 11.25	818; 7.02 m (23 ft 1/4 in)	710; 13.70 m (44 ft 11 1/4 in)	758; 1.95 m (6 ft 4 3/4 in)	848; 49.29	682; 16.46	709; 42.20 m (138 ft 5 1/4 in)	822; 4.71 m (15 ft 5 1/4 in)	613; 51.62 m (169 ft 4 1/4 in)	594; 4:54.08	
17	Keith Orona	United States	Cal State Fullerton Titans	7270	771; 11.41	725; 6.62 m (21 ft 8 1/2 in)	756; 14.45 m (47 ft 4 3/4 in)	813; 2.01 m (6 ft 7 in)	754; 51.33	795; 15.46	706; 42.01 m (137 ft 9 3/4 in)	705; 4.31 m (14 ft 1 1/2 in)	643; 53.66 m (176 ft 1/2 in)	602; 4:52.85	
18	Paul Olson	United States	North Dakota State Bison	7185	830; 11.14	725; 6.62 m (21 ft 8 1/2 in)	674; 13.11 m (43 ft 0 in)	813; 2.01 m (6 ft 7 in)	846; 49.33	787; 15.53	610; 37.29 m (122 ft 4 in)	676; 4.21 m (13 ft 9 1/2 in)	648; 54.00 m (177 ft 1 3/4 in)	576; 4:57.19	
19	Seth Johnson	United States	California Golden Bears	6643	892; 10.86	767; 6.80 m (22 ft 3 1/2 in)	659; 12.86 m (42 ft 2 1/4 in)	0 NH	887; 48.45	777; 15.61	677; 40.60 m (133 ft 2 1/4 in)	734; 4.41 m (14 ft 5 1/2 in)	575; 49.07 m (160 ft 11 3/4 in)	675; 4:40.92	
20	John Swabik	United States	Kansas Jayhawks	6587	784; 11.35	792; 6.91 m (22 ft 8 in)	668; 13.02 m (42 ft 8 1/2 in)	758; 1.95 m (6 ft 4 3/4 in)	0 DQ	822; 15.23	711; 42.28 m (138 ft 8 1/2 in)	763; 4.51 m (14 ft 9 1/2 in)	554; 47.68 m (156 ft 5 in)	735; 4:31.48	
21	Max Forte	United States	Duke Blue Devils	5921	919; 10.74	982; 7.69 m (25 ft 2 3/4 in)	701; 13.55 m (44 ft 5 1/4 in)	758; 1.95 m (6 ft 4 3/4 in)	916; 47.85	765; 15.72	637; 38.62 m (126 ft 8 1/4 in)	0 NH	243; 25.99 m (85 ft 3 in)	0 DNF	
—	Jip de Greef	Netherlands	Illinois Fighting Illini	DNF	910; 10.78	878; 7.27 m (23 ft 10 in)	711; 13.71 m (44 ft 11 3/4 in)	731; 1.92 m (6 ft 3 1/2 in)	0 DQ	912; 14.49	834; 48.24 m (158 ft 3 in)	0 DNS	0 DNS	0 DNS	
—	Andreas Hantson	Estonia	Illinois Fighting Illini	DNF	789; 11.33	852; 7.16 m (23 ft 5 3/4 in)	690; 13.38 m (43 ft 10 3/4 in)	785; 1.98 m (6 ft 5 3/4 in)	834; 49.59	821; 15.24	715; 42.49 m (139 ft 4 3/4 in)	0 DNS	0 DNS	0 DNS	
—	Teko Cates	United States	Washington Huskies	DNF	897; 10.84	898; 7.35 m (24 ft 1 1/4 in)	653; 12.76 m (41 ft 10 1/4 in)	758; 1.95 m (6 ft 4 3/4 in)	0 DNS	0 DNS	0 DNS	0 DNS	0 DNS	0 DNS	

=== Women ===
==== Women's 100 meters ====
In the preliminary heats, Adaejah Hodge broke the collegiate record with a time of 10.63 seconds (with a tail wind of 1.9 m/s).

Wind: +0.0 m/s

Placings in the women's 100 meters at the 2026 NCAA Division I Outdoor Track and Field Championships
Rank	Athlete	Nationality	Team	Time	Notes
1st place, gold medalist(s)	Shenese Walker	Jamaica	Florida State Seminoles	10.88	
2nd place, silver medalist(s)	Adaejah Hodge	British Virgin Islands	Georgia Bulldogs	10.93	
3rd place, bronze medalist(s)	Shawnti Jackson	United States	LSU Tigers	11.01	
4	Alicia Burnett	United States	Ole Miss Rebels	11.05	
5	Dana Wilson	United States	Tennessee Volunteers	11.09	
6	Gabrielle Matthews	Jamaica	Florida Gators	11.12	
7	Tima Godbless	Nigeria	LSU Tigers	11.13	
8	Brianna Selby	United States	USC Trojans	11.14	
—	JaMeesia Ford	United States	South Carolina Gamecocks	DNS	
				Wind: (±0.0 m/s)	

==== Women's 200 meters ====
Wind: -0.4 m/s

Placings in the women's 200 meters at the 2026 NCAA Division I Outdoor Track and Field Championships
Rank	Athlete	Nationality	Team	Time	Notes
1st place, gold medalist(s)	Adaejah Hodge	British Virgin Islands	Georgia Bulldogs	21.68	CR
2nd place, silver medalist(s)	Shawnti Jackson	United States	LSU Tigers	22.12	PB
3rd place, bronze medalist(s)	Camryn Dickson	United States	Texas A&M Aggies	22.18	
4	Gabrielle Matthews	Jamaica	Florida Gators	22.29	
5	Yahnari Lyons	United States	Howard Bison	22.31	PB
6	Dajaz DeFrand	United States	USC Trojans	22.44	
7	Alexis Brown	United States	South Carolina Gamecocks	22.49	SB
8	Tiriah Kelley	United States	Baylor Bears	22.54	
9	Christine Mallard	United States	USC Trojans	22.58	
				Wind: (−0.4 m/s)	

==== Women's 400 meters ====
Placings in the women's 400 meters at the 2026 NCAA Division I Outdoor Track and Field Championships
Rank	Athlete	Nationality	Team	Time	Notes
1st place, gold medalist(s)	Dejanea Oakley	Jamaica	Georgia Bulldogs	48.79	CR
2nd place, silver medalist(s)	Madison Whyte	United States	USC Trojans	48.97	PB
3rd place, bronze medalist(s)	Javonya Valcourt	Bahamas	Tennessee Volunteers	50.16	PB
4	Kaylyn Brown	United States	Arkansas Razorbacks	50.25	
5	Sydney Segalla	United States	Boston College Eagles	50.48	
6	Sanaria Butler	United States	Arkansas Razorbacks	50.51	
7	Rachel Joseph	United States	Iowa State Cyclones	50.82	
8	Onyah Favour	Nigeria	Southeastern Louisiana Lions	50.91	
9	Braelyn Baker	United States	Duke Blue Devils	51.67	

==== Women's 800 meters ====
Placings in the women's 800 meters at the 2026 NCAA Division I Outdoor Track and Field Championships
Rank	Athlete	Nationality	Team	Time	Notes
1st place, gold medalist(s)	Sanu Jallow-Lockhart	Gambia	Arkansas Razorbacks	1:56.85	CR
2nd place, silver medalist(s)	Hayley Kitching	Australia	Penn State Nittany Lions	1:57.65	PB
3rd place, bronze medalist(s)	Lauren Tolbert	United States	Duke Blue Devils	1:58.22	PB
4	Makayla Paige	United States	North Carolina Tar Heels	1:58.30	PB
5	Analisse Batista	United States	Arkansas Razorbacks	1:58.41	PB
6	Emmah Jemutai	Kenya	Kansas Jayhawks	1:58.55	PB
7	Gladys Chepngetich	Kenya	Clemson Tigers	1:59.53	
8	Janet Jepkemboi Amimo	Kenya	Kentucky Wildcats	1:59.82	
9	Juliette Whittaker	United States	Stanford Cardinal	2:00.54	

==== Women's 1500 meters ====
Placings in the women's 1500 meters at the 2026 NCAA Division I Outdoor Track and Field Championships
Rank	Athlete	Nationality	Team	Time	Notes
1st place, gold medalist(s)	Rosemary Longisa	Kenya	Washington State Cougars	4:12.10	
2nd place, silver medalist(s)	Salma Elbadra	Morocco	South Carolina Gamecocks	4:12.89	
3rd place, bronze medalist(s)	Juliet Cherubet	Kenya	Oregon Ducks	4:12.99	
4	Wilma Nielsen	Sweden	Oregon Ducks	4:13.40	
5	Carlee Hansen-Thompson	United States	BYU Cougars	4:13.66	
6	Emmah Jemutai	Kenya	Kansas Jayhawks	4:14.75	
7	Tia Wilson	Great Britain	Florida Gators	4:15.20	
8	Carmen Alder	United States	BYU Cougars	4:15.26	
9	Şilan Ayyıldız	Turkey	Oregon Ducks	4:15.47	
10	Hayley Burns	United States	Northern Arizona Lumberjacks	4:15.81	
11	Sadie Engelhardt	United States	NC State Wolfpack	4:16.96	
12	Elizabeth Whaley	United States	Wake Forest Demon Deacons	4:18.49	

==== Women's 5000 meters ====
Placings in the women's 5000 meters at the 2026 NCAA Division I Outdoor Track and Field Championships
Rank	Athlete	Nationality	Team	Time	Notes
1st place, gold medalist(s)	Marion Jepngetich	Kenya	New Mexico Lobos	15:13.01	PB
2nd place, silver medalist(s)	Mercyline Kirwa	Kenya	Iowa State Cyclones	15:13.72	PB
3rd place, bronze medalist(s)	Judy Chepkoech	Kenya	Florida Gators	15:14.05	PB
4	Betty Kipkore	Kenya	Iowa State Cyclones	15:14.43	
5	Pamela Kosgei	Kenya	New Mexico Lobos	15:15.88	
6	Hilda Olemomoi	Kenya	Florida Gators	15:16.23	SB
7	Edna Chelulei	Kenya	Eastern Kentucky Colonels	15:18.21	PB
8	Katie Bohlke	United States	Virginia Tech Hokies	15:18.71	PB
9	Jane Hedengren	United States	BYU Cougars	15:22.88	
10	Juliet Cherubet	Kenya	Oregon Ducks	15:25.41	PB
11	Hannah Gapes	New Zealand	NC State Wolfpack	15:25.93	PB
12	Jadyn Keeler	Canada	North Dakota Fighting Hawks	15:27.43	
13	Chloe Thomas	Canada	Washington Huskies	15:35.65	
14	Vera Sjöberg	Sweden	North Carolina Tar Heels	15:42.42	
15	Domtila Cheruto	Kenya	Oklahoma Sooners	15:47.30	
16	Brynn Brown	United States	North Carolina Tar Heels	15:51.69	
17	Bethany Michalak	United States	NC State Wolfpack	15:52.98	
18	Nancy Cherop	Kenya	Clemson Tigers	15:54.98	
19	Julia David-Smith	France	Washington Huskies	15:58.27	
20	Rosina Machu	United States	Gonzaga Bulldogs	15:59.25	
21	Isca Chelangat	Kenya	Oklahoma State Cowgirls	16:04.00	
22	Edna Chepkemoi	Kenya	LSU Tigers	16:40.12	
—	Doris Lemngole	Kenya	Alabama Crimson Tide	DQ	15.5-3g
—	Brighter Jepchumba	Kenya	Eastern Kentucky Colonels	DNS	

==== Women's 10000 meters ====
Placings in the women's 10000 meters at the 2026 NCAA Division I Outdoor Track and Field Championships
Rank	Athlete	Nationality	Team	Time	Notes
1st place, gold medalist(s)	Mercyline Kirwa	Kenya	Iowa State Cyclones	31:54.88	
2nd place, silver medalist(s)	Pamela Kosgei	Kenya	New Mexico Lobos	31:56.49	
3rd place, bronze medalist(s)	Jane Hedengren	United States	BYU Cougars	31:57.94	
4	Betty Kipkore	Kenya	Iowa State Cyclones	31:59.72	PB
5	Joy Naukot	Kenya	West Virginia Mountaineers	32:01.51	SB
6	Jadyn Keeler	Canada	North Dakota Fighting Hawks	32:04.97	
7	Rylee Blade	United States	Florida State Seminoles	32:08.83	PB
8	Jenna Hutchins	United States	BYU Cougars	32:16.16	
9	Hilda Olemomoi	Kenya	Florida Gators	32:21.62	
10	Domtila Cheruto	Kenya	Oklahoma Sooners	32:25.66	
11	Rosina Machu	United States	Gonzaga Bulldogs	32:26.18	SB
12	Mercy Jebitok	Kenya	Akron Zips	32:26.81	PB
13	Diana Cherotich	Kenya	Oregon Ducks	32:29.28	
14	Abigael Chemnagei	Kenya	LSU Tigers	32:36.65	PB
15	Ruth Kimeli	Kenya	Baylor Bears	32:44.13	
16	Brighter Jepchumba	Kenya	Eastern Kentucky Colonels	32:48.21	
17	Amaya Aramini	United States	Notre Dame Fighting Irish	32:49.01	
18	Caren Kiplagat	Kenya	Alabama Crimson Tide	33:01.41	
19	Brooke Wilson	United States	Wake Forest Demon Deacons	33:05.05	SB
20	Chloe Thomas	Canada	Washington Huskies	33:05.34	
21	Abbey Nechanicky	United States	Colorado Buffaloes	33:10.06	
22	Ruth White	United States	New Hampshire Wildcats	33:11.62	
23	Lily Murphy	United States	Penn Quakers	33:13.58	
24	Angelina Perez	United States	Wake Forest Demon Deacons	33:45.96	

==== Women's 100-meter hurdles ====
Wind: +1.2 m/s

Placings in the women's 100-meter hurdles at the 2026 NCAA Division I Outdoor Track and Field Championships
Rank	Athlete	Nationality	Team	Time	Notes
1st place, gold medalist(s)	Aaliyah McCormick	United States	Oregon Ducks	12.47	
2nd place, silver medalist(s)	Celeste Polzonetti	Italy	UCLA Bruins	12.79 [.782]	
3rd place, bronze medalist(s)	Janela Spencer	Jamaica	Ohio State Buckeyes	12.79 [.789]	
4	Tonie-Ann Forbes	Jamaica	Texas Tech Red Raiders	12.80	
5	Symoria Adkins	United States	Texas Tech Red Raiders	12.82	
6	Jaiya Covington	United States	Texas A&M Aggies	12.96	
7	Rachel Mehringer	United States	Indiana State Sycamores	12.99	
8	Tashina Alase	United States	Southern Jaguars	13.18	
—	Emmi Scales	United States	Kentucky Wildcats	DQ	15.5-2a
				Wind: (+1.2 m/s)	

==== Women's 400-meter hurdles ====
Placings in the women's 400-meter hurdles at the 2026 NCAA Division I Outdoor Track and Field Championships
Rank	Athlete	Nationality	Team	Time	Notes
1st place, gold medalist(s)	Akala Garrett	United States	South Carolina Gamecocks	53.32	CL
2nd place, silver medalist(s)	Amelliah Birdow	United States	Texas Longhorns	53.60	PB
3rd place, bronze medalist(s)	Saira Prince	United States	Arkansas Razorbacks	54.36	PB
4	Michelle Smith	U.S. Virgin Islands	Georgia Bulldogs	55.10	
5	Kelsie Belquist	United States	Nebraska Cornhuskers	55.34	
6	Cenaiya Billups	United States	Howard Bison	55.42	
7	Vanice Kerubo Nyagisera	Kenya	Kentucky Wildcats	55.45	
8	Vanessa Balde	Germany	Texas Tech Red Raiders	56.21	
9	Morgan Herbst	United States	Arkansas Razorbacks	56.44	

==== Women's 3000-meter steeplechase ====
Placings in the women's 3000-meter steeplechase at the 2026 NCAA Division I Outdoor Track and Field Championships
Rank	Athlete	Nationality	Team	Time	Notes
1st place, gold medalist(s)	Taylor Lovell	United States	BYU Cougars	9:21.03	PB
2nd place, silver medalist(s)	Sophie Novak	United States	Notre Dame Fighting Irish	9:26.53	
3rd place, bronze medalist(s)	Cynthia Jemutai	Kenya	Alabama Crimson Tide	9:33.36	PB
4	Angelina Napoleon	United States	NC State Wolfpack	9:35.56	SB
5	Katelyn Stewart-Barnett	Canada	Michigan State Spartans	9:36.69	SB
6	Kate Putman	Canada	NC State Wolfpack	9:45.96	
7	Jule Lindner	Germany	Virginia Tech Hokies	9:47.96	
8	Mercy Kinyanjui	Kenya	West Virginia Mountaineers	9:50.03	
9	Sydney Masciarelli	United States	North Carolina Tar Heels	9:51.87	
10	Barrett Justema	United States	Georgetown Hoyas	9:53.46	
11	Constanze Paoli	Germany	Idaho Vandals	10:08.28	
12	Raygan Dimond	United States	BYU Cougars	10:25.18	

==== Women's 4 × 100-meter relay ====
Placings in the women's 4 × 100-meter relay at the 2026 NCAA Division I Outdoor Track and Field Championships
Rank	Team	Time	Notes
1st place, gold medalist(s)	USC Trojans	41.58	CL
2nd place, silver medalist(s)	LSU Lady Tigers	41.74	SB
3rd place, bronze medalist(s)	Georgia Bulldogs	41.89	SB
4	Texas A&M Aggies	42.34	SB
5	Tennessee Volunteers	42.40	SB
6	Florida State Seminoles	42.81	SB
7	Texas Longhorns	42.94	SB
8	Texas Tech Red Raiders	43.09	
—	South Carolina Gamecocks	DNF	

==== Women's 4 × 400-meter relay ====
Placings in the women's 4 × 400-meter relay at the 2026 NCAA Division I Outdoor Track and Field Championships
Rank	Team	Time	Notes
1st place, gold medalist(s)	Arkansas Razorbacks	3:18.88	CL
2nd place, silver medalist(s)	Georgia Bulldogs	3:20.96	SB
3rd place, bronze medalist(s)	Tennessee Volunteers	3:23.75	
4	Duke Blue Devils	3:24.59	SB
5	Iowa Hawkeyes	3:25.10	SB
6	Florida Gators	3:25.73	
7	USC Trojans	3:26.80	
8	Kansas State Wildcats	3:29.27	
9	Kentucky Wildcats	3:29.60	

==== Women's long jump ====
Placings in the women's long jump at the 2026 NCAA Division I Outdoor Track and Field Championships
Rank	Athlete	Nationality	Team	Mark	Wind (m/s)	Notes
1st place, gold medalist(s)	Alyssa Jones	United States	Stanford Cardinal	7.06 m (23 ft 1 3/4 in)	+0.2	MR
2nd place, silver medalist(s)	Shantae Foreman	Jamaica	Clemson Tigers	6.69 m (21 ft 11 1/4 in)	+0.2	PB
3rd place, bronze medalist(s)	Caelyn Harris	United States	Alabama Crimson Tide	6.65 m (21 ft 9 3/4 in)	+0.2	PB
4	Sophia Beckmon	United States	Illinois Fighting Illini	6.57 m (21 ft 6 1/2 in)	+0.5	
5	Maeva Tahou	Switzerland	Charleston Southern Buccaneers	6.56 m (21 ft 6 1/4 in)	+0.1	PB
6	Trinity Shadd-Ceres	Canada	Creighton Bluejays	6.52 m (21 ft 4 1/2 in)	+0.5	PB
7	Morgan Davis	United States	Texas A&M Aggies	6.52 m (21 ft 4 1/2 in)	+0.5	
8	Aaliyah Lindsay	Jamaica	Kansas State Wildcats	6.44 m (21 ft 1 1/2 in)	+0.1	
9	Katharina Graman	Sweden	Illinois Fighting Illini	6.44 m (21 ft 1 1/2 in)	+1.6	SB
10	Tristen Harris	United States	South Carolina Gamecocks	6.43 m (21 ft 1 in)	+1.0	
11	Prestina Ochonogor	Nigeria	Tarleton State Texans	6.40 m (20 ft 11 3/4 in)	–0.3	
12	Janae De Gannes	Trinidad and Tobago	Baylor Bears	6.39 m (20 ft 11 1/2 in)	+1.0	
13	Amare Harlan	United States	Michigan Wolverines	6.37 m (20 ft 10 3/4 in)	+1.6	PB
14	Elizabeth Ndudi	Ireland	Illinois Fighting Illini	6.35 m (20 ft 10 in)	+0.5	
15	Ida Andrea Breigan	Norway	UTSA Roadrunners	6.34 m (20 ft 9 1/2 in)	+0.1	
16	Sydnie Vanek	United States	Arizona Wildcats	6.31 m (20 ft 8 1/4 in)	+0.9	
17	Alexandra Kelly	United States	Princeton Tigers	6.24 m (20 ft 5 1/2 in)	+2.3	
18	Georgina Scoot	Great Britain	Princeton Tigers	6.15 m (20 ft 2 in)	+0.4	
19	Paige Floriea	United States	Rutgers Scarlet Knights	6.08 m (19 ft 11 1/4 in)	+0.8	
20	Sydney Willits	United States	Iowa State Cyclones	6.08 m (19 ft 11 1/4 in)	+1.2	
21	Peace Omonzane	Canada	Boston University Terriers	5.92 m (19 ft 5 in)	+1.4	
22	Lena Gooden	United States	Vanderbilt Commodores	5.92 m (19 ft 5 in)	+0.9	
23	Mariia Horielova	Ukraine	Alabama Crimson Tide	5.88 m (19 ft 3 1/4 in)	–0.3	
—	Eve Divinity	United States	Louisville Cardinals	NM		

==== Women's triple jump ====
Placings in the women's triple jump at the 2026 NCAA Division I Outdoor Track and Field Championships
Rank	Athlete	Nationality	Team	Mark	Wind (m/s)	Notes
1st place, gold medalist(s)	Shantae Foreman	Jamaica	Clemson Tigers	14.24 m (46 ft 8 1/2 in)	+1.2	CL
2nd place, silver medalist(s)	Sharifa Davronova	Uzbekistan	Oregon Ducks	14.15 m (46 ft 5 in)	+2.3	
3rd place, bronze medalist(s)	Destini Smith	United States	Kansas State Wildcats	13.79 m (45 ft 2 3/4 in)	+1.5	
4	Asia Phillips	Canada	Florida Gators	13.57 m (44 ft 6 1/4 in)	+3.2	
5	Chelsea Aninyei	United States	UC Riverside Highlanders	13.52 m (44 ft 4 1/4 in)	+1.8	PB
6	Maeva Tahou	Switzerland	Charleston Southern Buccaneers	13.44 m (44 ft 1 in)	+0.5	PB
7	Georgina Scoot	Great Britain	Princeton Tigers	13.38 m (43 ft 10 3/4 in)	+2.1	
8	Jeanne Le Goff	France	Texas Longhorns	13.38 m (43 ft 10 3/4 in)	+0.6	
9	Adriana Kruzmane	Latvia	Miami Hurricanes	13.34 m (43 ft 9 in)	–0.9	
10	Kayla Pinkard	United States	Florida State Seminoles	13.26 m (43 ft 6 in)	+1.6	
11	Daniela Wamokpego	France	Kansas State Wildcats	13.25 m (43 ft 5 1/2 in)	+2.1	
12	Machaeda Linton	Jamaica	Texas A&M Aggies	13.24 m (43 ft 5 1/4 in)	+1.2	
13	Grace Oshiokpu	Nigeria	Texas Tech Red Raiders	13.23 m (43 ft 4 3/4 in)	+4.3	
14	Daedrian Beville	United States	Alabama State Lady Hornets	13.19 m (43 ft 3 1/4 in)	+0.3	
15	Taryn Burkett	United States	Grand Canyon Antelopes	13.15 m (43 ft 1 1/2 in)	+0.9	
16	Danah Nembhard	United States	Georgia Bulldogs	12.90 m (42 ft 3 3/4 in)	+1.2	
17	Manie Mevo	United States	Mississippi State Bulldogs	12.87 m (42 ft 2 1/2 in)	+0.0	
18	Olivia Dowd	United States	North Carolina A&T Aggies	12.80 m (41 ft 11 3/4 in)	+3.2	
19	Diarra Sow	Great Britain	Minnesota Golden Gophers	12.80 m (41 ft 11 3/4 in)	+1.0	
20	Kaitlyn Cook	United States	Virginia Tech Hokies	12.65 m (41 ft 6 in)	+1.6	
21	Tamiah Washington	United States	Texas Tech Red Raiders	12.34 m (40 ft 5 3/4 in)	+1.9	
—	Alba Cuns Iglesias	Spain	Louisville Cardinals	NM		
—	Cassandra Atkins	United States	Oregon Ducks	NM		
—	Katharina Graman	Sweden	Illinois Fighting Illini	NM		

==== Women's high jump ====
Placings in the women's high jump at the 2026 NCAA Division I Outdoor Track and Field Championships
Rank	Athlete	Nationality	Team	1.74	1.79	1.84	1.87	1.90	1.93	1.96	1.99	Mark	Notes
1st place, gold medalist(s)	Temitope Adeshina	Nigeria	Texas Tech Red Raiders	–	o	o	o	o	o	o	xxx	1.96 m (6 ft 5 in)	CL
2nd place, silver medalist(s)	Rose Amoanimaa Yeboah	Ghana	Illinois Fighting Illini	–	o	xxo	xxo	o	xo	xxo	xxx	1.96 m (6 ft 5 in)	SB
3rd place, bronze medalist(s)	Kya Crooke	United States	Arizona Wildcats	o	o	o	o	o	xxx			1.90 m (6 ft 2 3/4 in)	PB
4	Ela Velepec	Slovenia	Nebraska Cornhuskers	o	o	o	xxo	xxo	xxx			1.90 m (6 ft 2 3/4 in)	PB
4	Karsyn Leeling	United States	Nebraska Cornhuskers	o	o	xo	xo	xxo	xxx			1.90 m (6 ft 2 3/4 in)	PB
6	Valentina Fakrogha	United States	UCLA Bruins	o	o	o	o	xxx				1.87 m (6 ft 1 1/2 in)	
7	Paris Mikinski	United States	Arizona Wildcats	–	o	xo	o	xxx				1.87 m (6 ft 1 1/2 in)	=PB
8	Alyssa Jones	United States	Stanford Cardinal	o	xo	xxo	o	xxx				1.87 m (6 ft 1 1/2 in)	=SB
9	Amarianna Lofton	United States	Purdue Boilermakers	o	o	xo	xxo	xxx				1.87 m (6 ft 1 1/2 in)	PB
10	Emma Gates	United States	Arizona Wildcats	o	o	xxo	xxx					1.84 m (6 ft 1/4 in)	
11	Alysa Carrigan	United States	Princeton Tigers	xo	o	xxo	xxx					1.84 m (6 ft 1/4 in)	PB
11	María Arboleda	Colombia	Arkansas Razorbacks	xo	o	xxo	xxx					1.84 m (6 ft 1/4 in)	
13	Annishka McDonald	Jamaica	West Virginia Mountaineers	o	o	xxx						1.79 m (5 ft 10 1/4 in)	
13	Macaria Moore	United States	Cincinnati Bearcats	o	o	xxx						1.79 m (5 ft 10 1/4 in)	
13	Celia Rifaterra	Spain	Virginia Cavaliers	o	o	xxx						1.79 m (5 ft 10 1/4 in)	
13	Spirit Morgan	United States	North Carolina A&T Aggies	–	o	xxx						1.79 m (5 ft 10 1/4 in)	
17	Diamonasia Taylor	United States	Alabama Crimson Tide	xo	o	xxx						1.79 m (5 ft 10 1/4 in)	
18	Evelyn Lavielle	United States	Texas Tech Red Raiders	o	xo	xxx						1.79 m (5 ft 10 1/4 in)	
19	Jelese Alexander	Trinidad and Tobago	Wichita State Shockers	o	xxo	xxx						1.79 m (5 ft 10 1/4 in)	
19	Jenovia Logan	United States	Rutgers Scarlet Knights	o	xxo	xxx						1.79 m (5 ft 10 1/4 in)	=SB
19	Kemarah Howard	United States	Kentucky Wildcats	o	xxo	xxx						1.79 m (5 ft 10 1/4 in)	
22	Magdaline Campo	France	Miami Hurricanes	o	xxx							1.74 m (5 ft 8 1/2 in)	
23	Amaya Bien-Aime	United States	FIU Panthers	xo	xxx							1.74 m (5 ft 8 1/2 in)	
—	Mya Hines	United States	High Point Panthers	xxx								NH	

==== Women's pole vault ====
Placings in the women's pole vault the 2026 NCAA Division I Outdoor Track and Field Championships
Rank	Athlete	Nationality	Team	4.09	4.24	4.39	4.49	4.54	4.59	4.64	4.69	4.74	4.79	4.84	4.92	Mark	Notes
1st place, gold medalist(s)	Amanda Moll	United States	Washington Huskies	–	o	xo	–	o	–	o	–	o	–	xxo	xxr	4.84 m (15 ft 10 1/2 in)	CR
2nd place, silver medalist(s)	Hana Moll	United States	Washington Huskies	–	–	o	–	xo	–	o	–	xo	–	xxx		4.74 m (15 ft 6 1/2 in)	
3rd place, bronze medalist(s)	Anna Willis	United States	South Dakota Coyotes	o	o	o	o	o	xxo	o	xxx					4.64 m (15 ft 2 1/2 in)	PB
4	Ashley Callahan	United States	Louisville Cardinals	–	o	o	xo	o	–	xo	xxx					4.64 m (15 ft 2 1/2 in)	PB
5	Molly Haywood	United States	Baylor Bears	–	o	o	o	o	xo	xxx						4.59 m (15 ft 1/2 in)	PB
6	Hannah Grace	United States	Tennessee Volunteers	–	xo	o	o	xxo	xxx							4.54 m (14 ft 10 1/2 in)	PB
7	Lexi Evans	United States	Cal Poly Mustangs	–	o	o	o	xxx								4.49 m (14 ft 8 3/4 in)	PB
8	Tenly Kuhn	United States	Baylor Bears	–	xo	o	xo	xxx								4.49 m (14 ft 8 3/4 in)	
9	Sara Borton	United States	Washington Huskies	o	o	xxo	xxx									4.49 m (14 ft 8 3/4 in)	PB
9	Gemma Tutton	Great Britain	Duke Blue Devils	–	o	xxo	xxx									4.49 m (14 ft 8 3/4 in)	PB
11	Mia Morello	United States	Illinois Fighting Illini	–	o	o	xxx									4.39 m (14 ft 4 3/4 in)	
12	Marleen Mülla	Estonia	South Dakota Coyotes	xo	xxo	o	xxx									4.39 m (14 ft 4 3/4 in)	
13	Ali Sahaida	United States	California Golden Bears	–	o	xo	xxx									4.39 m (14 ft 4 3/4 in)	
13	Mason Meinershagen	United States	Kansas Jayhawks	o	o	xo	xxx									4.39 m (14 ft 4 3/4 in)	
15	Veronica Vacca	United States	Washington Huskies	o	xo	xo	xxx									4.39 m (14 ft 4 3/4 in)	
16	Chiara Sistermann	Germany	Virginia Tech Hokies	o	xxo	xo	xxx									4.39 m (14 ft 4 3/4 in)	
17	Iliana Triantafyllou	Greece	Louisville Cardinals	o	o	xxo	xxx									4.39 m (14 ft 4 3/4 in)	PB
18	Jathiyah Muhammad	United States	South Carolina Gamecocks	o	xxx											4.09 m (13 ft 5 in)	
18	Abby Knouff	United States	Cincinnati Bearcats	o	xxx											4.09 m (13 ft 5 in)	
18	Emily Romano	United States	High Point Panthers	o	xxx											4.09 m (13 ft 5 in)	
18	Avery Hilliard	United States	Cornell Big Red	o	xxx											4.09 m (13 ft 5 in)	
22	Tessa Mudd	United States	Princeton Tigers	xo	xxx											4.09 m (13 ft 5 in)	
23	Sarah Ferguson	United States	Kentucky Wildcats	xxo	xxx											4.09 m (13 ft 5 in)	
23	Kennedy Drish	United States	George Mason Patriots	xxo	xxx											4.09 m (13 ft 5 in)	

==== Women's shot put ====
Placings in the women's shot put at the 2026 NCAA Division I Outdoor Track and Field Championships
Rank	Athlete	Nationality	Team	Mark	Notes
1st place, gold medalist(s)	Axelina Johansson	Sweden	Nebraska Cornhuskers	19.92 m (65 ft 4 1/4 in)	MR
2nd place, silver medalist(s)	Ashley Erasmus	South Africa	USC Trojans	18.14 m (59 ft 6 in)	
3rd place, bronze medalist(s)	Alida van Daalen	Netherlands	Florida Gators	18.12 m (59 ft 5 1/4 in)	SB
4	Jessica Oji	Nigeria	Penn Quakers	17.98 m (58 ft 11 3/4 in)	
5	Miné de Klerk	South Africa	Nebraska Cornhuskers	17.86 m (58 ft 7 in)	
6	Nina Chioma Ndubuisi	Germany	Georgia Bulldogs	17.67 m (57 ft 11 1/2 in)	
7	Elizabeth Tapper	United States	Michigan Wolverines	17.54 m (57 ft 6 1/2 in)	SB
8	Megan Hague	United States	Auburn Tigers	17.51 m (57 ft 5 1/4 in)	
9	Anthonett Nabwe	Liberia	Minnesota Golden Gophers	17.40 m (57 ft 1 in)	
10	Makayla Long	United States	Colorado State Rams	17.07 m (56 ft 0 in)	
11	Kelsie Murrel-Ross	Grenada	Georgia Bulldogs	17.02 m (55 ft 10 in)	
12	Donna Douglas	United States	Nebraska Cornhuskers	16.94 m (55 ft 6 3/4 in)	
13	Abigail Russell	United States	Michigan Wolverines	16.61 m (54 ft 5 3/4 in)	
14	Sydney Brewster	United States	Montana State Bobcats	16.61 m (54 ft 5 3/4 in)	
15	Kaia Tupu-South	New Zealand	Louisville Cardinals	16.46 m (54 ft 0 in)	
16	Sasha Garnett	United States	Penn State Nittany Lions	16.37 m (53 ft 8 1/4 in)	
17	Jolina Lange	Germany	Nebraska Cornhuskers	16.29 m (53 ft 5 1/4 in)	
18	Marley Raikiwasa	Australia	Auburn Tigers	16.24 m (53 ft 3 1/4 in)	
19	Daisy Monie	United States	UTSA Roadrunners	16.24 m (53 ft 3 1/4 in)	
20	Britannie Johnson	Jamaica	Purdue Boilermakers	16.02 m (52 ft 6 1/2 in)	
21	Niya Crawford	United States	Pittsburgh Panthers	15.96 m (52 ft 4 1/4 in)	
22	Carlie Weiser	United States	Texas A&M Aggies	15.90 m (52 ft 1 3/4 in)	
23	Cleo Agyepong	Great Britain	Houston Cougars	15.74 m (51 ft 7 1/2 in)	
24	Alicia Khunou	South Africa	Oregon Ducks	15.73 m (51 ft 7 1/4 in)	

==== Women's discus throw ====
Placings in the women's discus throw at the 2026 NCAA Division I Outdoor Track and Field Championships
Rank	Athlete	Nationality	Team	Mark	Notes
1st place, gold medalist(s)	Alida van Daalen	Netherlands	Florida Gators	65.98 m (216 ft 5 1/2 in)	MR
2nd place, silver medalist(s)	Joyce Oguama	Germany	Alabama Crimson Tide	59.98 m (196 ft 9 1/4 in)	
3rd place, bronze medalist(s)	Inés López	Spain	Arizona State Sun Devils	59.96 m (196 ft 8 1/2 in)	
4	Alicia Khunou	South Africa	Oregon Ducks	57.44 m (188 ft 5 1/4 in)	PB
5	Klaire Kovatch	United States	Colorado State Rams	57.01 m (187 ft 1/4 in)	
6	Layla Giordano	United States	Princeton Tigers	56.94 m (186 ft 9 1/2 in)	
7	Marie Josee Bovele-Linaka	France	Oregon Ducks	56.65 m (185 ft 10 1/4 in)	
8	Abigail Martin	Jamaica	Texas A&M Aggies	56.15 m (184 ft 2 1/2 in)	
9	Sofia Sluchaninova	Russia	Kansas Jayhawks	55.94 m (183 ft 6 1/4 in)	
10	Princesse Hyman	Guadeloupe	LSU Lady Tigers	55.83 m (183 ft 2 in)	
11	Ava Roberts	United States	UMBC Retrievers	55.82 m (183 ft 1 1/2 in)	PB
12	Chesni Scott	United States	Oklahoma Sooners	55.39 m (181 ft 8 1/2 in)	SB
13	Nadjela Wepiwé	Germany	Harvard Crimson	55.25 m (181 ft 3 in)	PB
14	Jamora Alves	Grenada	St. John's Red Storm	54.95 m (180 ft 3 1/4 in)	
15	Summer Mosley	United States	Cal State Northridge Matadors	54.59 m (179 ft 1 in)	
16	Reese Garland	United States	USC Trojans	54.51 m (178 ft 10 in)	
17	McKenzie Davis	United States	Texas Tech Red Raiders	54.48 m (178 ft 8 3/4 in)	
18	Akari Isaac	United States	Florida Gators	54.33 m (178 ft 2 3/4 in)	
19	Gracelyn Leiseth	United States	Florida Gators	53.98 m (177 ft 1 in)	
20	Kaiah Fisher	United States	BYU Cougars	53.20 m (174 ft 6 1/4 in)	
21	Amelia Flynt	United States	Nebraska Cornhuskers	52.13 m (171 ft 1/4 in)	
22	Calea Jackson	Bahamas	Miami Hurricanes	51.84 m (170 ft 3/4 in)	
23	Camryn Massey	United States	Auburn Tigers	49.90 m (163 ft 8 1/2 in)	
24	Morgan Hallett	United States	Ohio State Buckeyes	48.49 m (159 ft 1 in)	

==== Women's javelin throw ====
Placings in the women's javelin throw at the 2026 NCAA Division I Outdoor Track and Field Championships
Rank	Athlete	Nationality	Team	Mark	Notes
1st place, gold medalist(s)	Mckyla van der Westhuizen	South Africa	Rice Owls	60.87 m (199 ft 8 1/4 in)	PB
2nd place, silver medalist(s)	Evelyn Bliss	United States	Bucknell Bison	60.28 m (197 ft 9 in)	
3rd place, bronze medalist(s)	Irene Jepkemboi	Kenya	TCU Horned Frogs	60.16 m (197 ft 4 1/2 in)	SB
4	Valentina Barrios	Colombia	Missouri Tigers	57.17 m (187 ft 6 3/4 in)	
5	Lilly Urban	Germany	Nevada Wolf Pack	55.88 m (183 ft 4 in)	
6	Christiana Ellina	Cyprus	Virginia Cavaliers	54.99 m (180 ft 4 3/4 in)	PB
7	Shea Greene	United States	Princeton Tigers	54.90 m (180 ft 1 1/4 in)	
8	Arndis Oskarsdottir	Iceland	FIU Panthers	54.75 m (179 ft 7 1/2 in)	SB
9	Jana Lowka	Germany	Nebraska Cornhuskers	54.02 m (177 ft 2 3/4 in)	
10	Alexis Guillory	United States	LSU Lady Tigers	52.73 m (172 ft 11 3/4 in)	
11	Saydi Orange	United States	Washington Huskies	51.86 m (170 ft 1 1/2 in)	
12	Ellie Partrick	United States	Alabama Crimson Tide	51.67 m (169 ft 6 1/4 in)	
13	McKenzie Fairchild	United States	Texas A&M Aggies	51.13 m (167 ft 8 3/4 in)	
14	Katelyn Fairchild	United States	Texas A&M Aggies	51.10 m (167 ft 7 3/4 in)	
15	Elizabeth Bailey	United States	Vanderbilt Commodores	50.12 m (164 ft 5 in)	
16	Erin Tack	United States	Arizona Wildcats	49.87 m (163 ft 7 1/4 in)	
17	Sophia Mazzoni	United States	Auburn Tigers	49.67 m (162 ft 11 1/2 in)	
18	Kristen Jay	United States	Kent State Golden Flashes	49.16 m (161 ft 3 1/4 in)	
19	Skylar Ciccolini	United States	Missouri Tigers	48.82 m (160 ft 2 in)	
20	Emma Wapshare	United States	Vermont Catamounts	48.81 m (160 ft 1 1/2 in)	
21	Greyson Glivinski	United States	Oregon Ducks	48.43 m (158 ft 10 1/2 in)	
22	Charlize Goody	Australia	Texas State Bobcats	48.33 m (158 ft 6 3/4 in)	
23	Deisiane Teixeira	Brazil	Miami Hurricanes	47.92 m (157 ft 2 1/2 in)	
24	Spencer Young	United States	North Carolina Tar Heels	44.32 m (145 ft 4 3/4 in)	

==== Women's hammer throw ====
Placings in the women's hammer throw at the 2026 NCAA Division I Outdoor Track and Field Championships
Rank	Athlete	Nationality	Team	Mark	Notes
1st place, gold medalist(s)	Elísabet Rut Rúnarsdóttir	Iceland	Texas State Bobcats	73.19 m (240 ft 1 1/4 in)	PB
2nd place, silver medalist(s)	Anthonett Nabwe	Liberia	Minnesota Golden Gophers	73.15 m (239 ft 11 3/4 in)	
3rd place, bronze medalist(s)	Marie Rougetet	France	Mississippi State Bulldogs	69.71 m (228 ft 8 1/4 in)	
4	Hadley Streit	United States	Minnesota Golden Gophers	69.50 m (228 ft 0 in)	
5	Jordan Koskondy	United States	Illinois Fighting Illini	69.24 m (227 ft 1 3/4 in)	PB
6	Lara Roberts	Australia	Texas State Bobcats	69.05 m (226 ft 6 1/2 in)	SB
7	Kali Terza	United States	Kennesaw State Owls	68.72 m (225 ft 5 1/2 in)	
8	Valentina Savva	Cyprus	California Golden Bears	68.60 m (225 ft 3/4 in)	
9	Phethisang Makhethe	South Africa	Illinois Fighting Illini	68.40 m (224 ft 4 3/4 in)	
10	Giavonna Meeks	United States	Texas Longhorns	65.81 m (215 ft 10 3/4 in)	
11	Charlotta Sandkulla	Finland	Virginia Cavaliers	65.57 m (215 ft 1 1/4 in)	
12	Burklie Burton	United States	Oklahoma State Cowgirls	65.28 m (214 ft 2 in)	
13	Mariana Pestana	Portugal	Virginia Tech Hokies	64.89 m (212 ft 10 1/2 in)	
14	Oluwatomilayo Akintunde	United States	Illinois Fighting Illini	63.31 m (207 ft 8 1/2 in)	
15	Rachel Neaves	United States	Oklahoma State Cowgirls	63.29 m (207 ft 7 1/2 in)	
16	Catalina Rodríguez	Colombia	Alabama Crimson Tide	63.12 m (207 ft 1 in)	
17	Janiya Cesar	United States	FIU Panthers	62.94 m (206 ft 5 3/4 in)	PB
18	Ellie Roan	United States	Boston University Terriers	62.72 m (205 ft 9 1/4 in)	
19	Angela McAuslan-Kelly	Scotland	Princeton Tigers	61.63 m (202 ft 2 1/4 in)	
20	Norah Lind	Sweden	Auburn Tigers	61.58 m (202 ft 1/4 in)	
21	Imani Washington	United States	Florida Gators	60.49 m (198 ft 5 1/4 in)	
22	Kennedy Clarke	United States	Oklahoma Sooners	60.20 m (197 ft 6 in)	
23	Kendra Dye	United States	Clemson Tigers	59.10 m (193 ft 10 3/4 in)	
24	Kosi Umerah	United States	North Carolina Tar Heels	56.08 m (183 ft 11 3/4 in)	

==== Women's heptathlon ====
Placings in the women's heptathlon at the 2026 NCAA Division I Outdoor Track and Field Championships
Rank	Athlete	Nationality	Team	Overall points	100 mH	HJ	SP	200 m	LJ	JT	800 m	Notes
1st place, gold medalist(s)	Sofia Cosculluela	Spain	Washington Huskies	6182	1056; 13.46	842; 1.69 m (5 ft 6 1/2 in)	704; 12.64 m (41 ft 5 1/2 in)	972; 24.09	1014; 6.52 m (21 ft 4 1/2 in)	745; 44.06 m (144 ft 6 1/2 in)	849; 2:18.11	CL
2nd place, silver medalist(s)	Juliette Laracuente-Huebner	United States	Cincinnati Bearcats	6084	1056; 13.46	916; 1.75 m (5 ft 8 3/4 in)	684; 12.34 m (40 ft 5 3/4 in)	960; 24.22	981; 6.42 m (21 ft 3/4 in)	581; 35.50 m (116 ft 5 1/2 in)	906; 2:14.05	
3rd place, bronze medalist(s)	JaiCieonna Gero-Holt	United States	Illinois Fighting Illini	6010	1007; 13.80	991; 1.81 m (5 ft 11 1/4 in)	860; 14.98 m (49 ft 1 3/4 in)	887; 25.00	828; 5.93 m (19 ft 5 1/4 in)	631; 38.09 m (124 ft 11 1/2 in)	806; 2:21.32	PB
4	Hollan Powers	United States	Arizona Wildcats	6008	1090; 13.23	916; 1.75 m (5 ft 8 3/4 in)	695; 12.51 m (41 ft 1/2 in)	1003; 23.77	843; 5.98 m (19 ft 7 1/4 in)	509; 31.71 m (104 ft 1/4 in)	952; 2:10.87	PB
5	Meagan Humphries	United States	Illinois Fighting Illini	6008	1015; 13.74	916; 1.75 m (5 ft 8 3/4 in)	646; 11.77 m (38 ft 7 1/4 in)	1052; 23.27	924; 6.24 m (20 ft 5 1/2 in)	518; 32.20 m (105 ft 7 1/2 in)	937; 2:11.91	PB
6	Annie Molenhouse	United States	Oklahoma State Cowgirls	5971	1003; 13.83	842; 1.69 m (5 ft 6 1/2 in)	694; 12.50 m (41 ft 0 in)	1001; 23.79	798; 5.83 m (19 ft 1 1/2 in)	692; 41.27 m (135 ft 4 3/4 in)	941; 2:11.62	
7	Tabea Eitel	Germany	Texas Longhorns	5948	973; 14.04	916; 1.75 m (5 ft 8 3/4 in)	703; 12.63 m (41 ft 5 in)	862; 25.27	969; 6.38 m (20 ft 11 in)	704; 41.92 m (137 ft 6 1/4 in)	821; 2:20.20	PB
8	Joey Perry	United States	Northern Iowa Panthers	5913	946; 14.23	916; 1.75 m (5 ft 8 3/4 in)	676; 12.23 m (40 ft 1 1/4 in)	1006; 23.74	822; 5.91 m (19 ft 4 1/2 in)	614; 37.21 m (122 ft 3/4 in)	933; 2:12.21	PB
9	Pauline Bikembo	France	Florida Gators	5903	1020; 13.71	842; 1.69 m (5 ft 6 1/2 in)	602; 11.11 m (36 ft 5 1/4 in)	930; 24.53	874; 6.08 m (19 ft 11 1/4 in)	777; 45.71 m (149 ft 11 1/2 in)	858; 2:17.47	PB
10	Maresa Hense	Germany	Connecticut Huskies	5872	985; 13.95	879; 1.72 m (5 ft 7 1/2 in)	657; 11.94 m (39 ft 2 in)	967; 24.14	862; 6.04 m (19 ft 9 3/4 in)	558; 34.27 m (112 ft 5 in)	964; 2:10.05	PB
11	Marta Sivina	Latvia	Vanderbilt Commodores	5778	1043; 13.55	806; 1.66 m (5 ft 5 1/4 in)	639; 11.67 m (38 ft 3 1/4 in)	937; 24.46	871; 6.07 m (19 ft 10 3/4 in)	565; 34.65 m (113 ft 8 in)	917; 2:13.26	
12	Katy Stephens	United States	Northern Iowa Panthers	5776	977; 14.01	916; 1.75 m (5 ft 8 3/4 in)	698; 12.55 m (41 ft 2 in)	956; 24.26	762; 5.71 m (18 ft 8 3/4 in)	727; 43.09 m (141 ft 4 1/4 in)	740; 2:26.32	PB
13	Zoey Bonds	United States	BYU Cougars	5775	1036; 13.60	916; 1.75 m (5 ft 8 3/4 in)	616; 11.31 m (37 ft 1 1/4 in)	914; 24.71	846; 5.99 m (19 ft 7 3/4 in)	625; 37.77 m (123 ft 11 in)	822; 2:20.14	PB
14	Ella Rush	Gibraltar	Georgia Bulldogs	5709	977; 14.01	806; 1.66 m (5 ft 5 1/4 in)	658; 11.96 m (39 ft 2 3/4 in)	929; 24.54	940; 6.29 m (20 ft 7 1/2 in)	569; 34.86 m (114 ft 4 1/4 in)	830; 2:19.54	
15	Jenna Fee Feyerabend	Germany	San Diego State Aztecs	5709	929; 14.35	879; 1.72 m (5 ft 7 1/2 in)	782; 13.82 m (45 ft 4 in)	792; 26.06	816; 5.89 m (19 ft 3 3/4 in)	691; 41.25 m (135 ft 4 in)	820; 2:20.26	
16	Kenli Nettles	United States	Ball State Cardinals	5703	967; 14.08	736; 1.60 m (5 ft 2 3/4 in)	761; 13.50 m (44 ft 3 1/4 in)	947; 24.35	807; 5.86 m (19 ft 2 1/2 in)	678; 40.56 m (133 ft 3/4 in)	807; 2:21.20	PB
17	Angel Richmore	Sweden	Oklahoma Sooners	5700	960; 14.13	771; 1.63 m (5 ft 4 in)	785; 13.87 m (45 ft 6 in)	850; 25.40	813; 5.88 m (19 ft 3 1/4 in)	726; 43.07 m (141 ft 3 1/2 in)	795; 2:22.08	
18	Julia Gunnell	United States	Kentucky Wildcats	5646	1023; 13.69	842; 1.69 m (5 ft 6 1/2 in)	655; 11.91 m (39 ft 3/4 in)	949; 24.33	744; 5.65 m (18 ft 6 1/4 in)	527; 32.68 m (107 ft 2 1/2 in)	906; 2:14.06	PB
19	Joy Anderson	United States	UC Irvine Anteaters	5554	991; 13.91	953; 1.78 m (5 ft 10 in)	631; 11.54 m (37 ft 10 1/4 in)	936; 24.47	606; 5.17 m (16 ft 11 1/2 in)	547; 33.72 m (110 ft 7 1/2 in)	890; 2:15.22	
20	Logan Todorovich	United States	Baylor Bears	5533	984; 13.96	806; 1.66 m (5 ft 5 1/4 in)	571; 10.64 m (34 ft 10 3/4 in)	927; 24.57	859; 6.03 m (19 ft 9 1/4 in)	631; 38.10 m (125 ft 0 in)	755; 2:25.11	
21	Alice Taylor	New Zealand	Rice Owls	5490	903; 14.54	953; 1.78 m (5 ft 10 in)	631; 11.54 m (37 ft 10 1/4 in)	777; 26.23	741; 5.64 m (18 ft 6 in)	679; 40.60 m (133 ft 2 1/4 in)	806; 2:21.32	
22	Jolie Robinson	United States	UC Irvine Anteaters	5313	918; 14.43	701; 1.57 m (5 ft 1 3/4 in)	724; 12.95 m (42 ft 5 3/4 in)	872; 25.16	765; 5.72 m (18 ft 9 in)	668; 40.05 m (131 ft 4 3/4 in)	665; 2:32.27	
23	Abigail Weening	Canada	George Mason Patriots	4467	993; 13.90	879; 1.72 m (5 ft 7 1/2 in)	623; 11.43 m (37 ft 6 in)	0 DQ	789; 5.80 m (19 ft 1/4 in)	480; 30.18 m (99 ft 0 in)	703; 2:29.18	
—	Liisa-Maria Lusti	Estonia	Oregon Ducks	DNF	1020; 13.71	916; 1.75 m (5 ft 8 3/4 in)	608; 11.20 m (36 ft 8 3/4 in)	998; 23.82	421; 4.47 m (14 ft 7 3/4 in)	580; 35.44 m (116 ft 3 1/4 in)	0 DNS	

== Standings ==
Top 10 men's team scores at the 2026 NCAA Division I Outdoor Track and Field Championships
Rank	Team	Score
1st place, gold medalist(s)	Arkansas Razorbacks	56
2nd place, silver medalist(s)	Georgia Bulldogs	49
3rd place, bronze medalist(s)	Tennessee Volunteers	46
4	LSU Tigers	42
5	Oregon Ducks	40
6	Auburn Tigers	33
7	Louisville Cardinals	32
8	Kansas State Wildcats	30
9	Nebraska Cornhuskers	28
10	USC Trojans	27

Top 10 women's team scores at the 2026 NCAA Division I Outdoor Track and Field Championships
Rank	Team	Score
1st place, gold medalist(s)	Georgia Bulldogs	50
2nd place, silver medalist(s)	Florida Gators	43
3rd place, bronze medalist(s)	Arkansas Razorbacks	38
4	Oregon Ducks	36
5	USC Trojans	32
6	Iowa State Cyclones	30
7	Washington Huskies	28
8	Illinois Fighting Illini	27
8	Nebraska Cornhuskers	27
10	LSU Tigers	24

== Schedule ==
Schedule of the 2026 NCAA Division I Outdoor Track and Field Championships
Date	Category	Time (PT)	Event	Round division
Wednesday, June 10	Track events	5:05 p.m.	4×100m relay	Semifinal Men
Wednesday, June 10	Track events	5:21 p.m.	1500 meters	Semifinal Men
Wednesday, June 10	Track events	5:38 p.m.	3000 steeplechase	Semifinal Men
Wednesday, June 10	Track events	6:08 p.m.	110 meter hurdles	Semifinal Men
Wednesday, June 10	Track events	6:25 p.m.	100 meters	Semifinal Men
Wednesday, June 10	Track events	6:41 p.m.	400 meters	Semifinal Men
Wednesday, June 10	Track events	6:58 p.m.	800 meters	Semifinal Men
Wednesday, June 10	Track events	7:14 p.m.	400 meter hurdles	Semifinal Men
Wednesday, June 10	Track events	7:29 p.m.	200 meters	Semifinal Men
Wednesday, June 10	Track events	7:43 p.m.	400 meters	Decathlon Men
Wednesday, June 10	Track events	7:56 p.m.	10,000 meters	Final Men
Wednesday, June 10	Track events	8:36 p.m.	4×400m relay	Semifinal Men
Wednesday, June 10	Field events	2:30 p.m.	Hammer throw	Final Men
Wednesday, June 10	Field events	5:35 p.m.	Pole vault	Final Men
Wednesday, June 10	Field events	6:15 p.m.	Javelin throw	Final Men
Wednesday, June 10	Field events	6:40 p.m.	Long jump	Final Men
Wednesday, June 10	Field events	7:10 p.m.	Shot put	Final Men
Wednesday, June 10	Decathlon Men	1:00 p.m.	100 meters	Decathlon Men
Wednesday, June 10	Decathlon Men	1:40 p.m.	Long jump	Decathlon Men
Wednesday, June 10	Decathlon Men	2:55 p.m.	Shot put	Decathlon Men
Wednesday, June 10	Decathlon Men	4:10 p.m.	High jump	Decathlon Men
Wednesday, June 10	Decathlon Men	7:43 p.m.	400 meters	Decathlon Men
Thursday, June 11	Track events	5:05 p.m.	4×100m relay	Semifinal Women
Thursday, June 11	Track events	5:21 p.m.	1500 meters	Semifinal Women
Thursday, June 11	Track events	5:38 p.m.	3000 Steeplechase	Semifinal Women
Thursday, June 11	Track events	6:08 p.m.	100 meter Hurdles	Semifinal Women
Thursday, June 11	Track events	6:25 p.m.	100 meters	Semifinal Women
Thursday, June 11	Track events	6:41 p.m.	400 meters	Semifinal Women
Thursday, June 11	Track events	6:58 p.m.	800 meters	Semifinal Women
Thursday, June 11	Track events	7:14 p.m.	400 meter Hurdles	Semifinal Women
Thursday, June 11	Track events	7:29 p.m.	200 meters	Semifinal Women
Thursday, June 11	Track events	7:43 p.m.	1500 meters	Decathlon Men
Thursday, June 11	Track events	7:56 p.m.	10,000 meters	Final Women
Thursday, June 11	Track events	8:36 p.m.	4×400m relay	Semifinal Women
Thursday, June 11	Field events	2:30 p.m.	Hammer throw	Final Women
Thursday, June 11	Field events	5:35 p.m.	Javelin throw	Final Women
Thursday, June 11	Field events	6:15 p.m.	Pole vault	Final Women
Thursday, June 11	Field events	6:40 p.m.	Long jump	Final Women
Thursday, June 11	Field events	7:10 p.m.	Shot put	Final Women
Thursday, June 11	Decathlon Men	10:45 a.m.	110 hurdles	Decathlon Men
Thursday, June 11	Decathlon Men	11:35 a.m.	Discus	Decathlon Men
Thursday, June 11	Decathlon Men	12:45 p.m.	Pole vault	Decathlon Men
Thursday, June 11	Decathlon Men	3:15 p.m.	Javelin	Decathlon Men
Thursday, June 11	Decathlon Men	7:43 p.m.	1500 meters	Decathlon Men
Friday, June 12	Track events	5:02 p.m.	4×100m relay	Final Men
Friday, June 12	Track events	5:12 p.m.	1500 meters	Final Men
Friday, June 12	Track events	5:24 p.m.	3000 Steeplechase	Final Men
Friday, June 12	Track events	5:42 p.m.	110 meter hurdles	Final Men
Friday, June 12	Track events	5:52 p.m.	100 meters	Final Men
Friday, June 12	Track events	6:02 p.m.	400 meters	Final Men
Friday, June 12	Track events	6:14 p.m.	800 meters	Final Men
Friday, June 12	Track events	6:27 p.m.	400 meter hurdles	Final Men
Friday, June 12	Track events	6:37 p.m.	200 meters	Final Men
Friday, June 12	Track events	6:43 p.m.	200 meters	Heptathlon Women
Friday, June 12	Track events	6:55 p.m.	5000 meters	Final Men
Friday, June 12	Track events	7:21 p.m.	4×400m relay	Final Men
Friday, June 12	Field events	2:15 p.m.	Discus	Final Men
Friday, June 12	Field events	4:30 p.m.	High jump	Final Men
Friday, June 12	Field events	5:10 p.m.	Triple jump	Final Men
Friday, June 12	Heptathlon Women	11:45 a.m.	100 meters	Heptathlon Women
Friday, June 12	Heptathlon Women	12:45 p.m.	High jump	Heptathlon Women
Friday, June 12	Heptathlon Women	2:45 p.m.	Shot put	Heptathlon Women
Friday, June 12	Heptathlon Women	6:43 p.m.	200 meters	Heptathlon Women
Saturday, June 13	Track events	5:02 p.m.	4×100m relay	Final Women
Saturday, June 13	Track events	5:12 p.m.	1500 meters	Final Women
Saturday, June 13	Track events	5:24 p.m.	3000 steeplechase	Final Women
Saturday, June 13	Track events	5:42 p.m.	100 meter hurdles	Final Women
Saturday, June 13	Track events	5:52 p.m.	100 meters	Final Women
Saturday, June 13	Track events	6:02 p.m.	400 meters	Final Women
Saturday, June 13	Track events	6:14 p.m.	800 meters	Final Women
Saturday, June 13	Track events	6:27 p.m.	400 meter hurdles	Final Women
Saturday, June 13	Track events	6:37 p.m.	200 meters	Final Women
Saturday, June 13	Track events	6:43 p.m.	800 meters	Heptathlon Women
Saturday, June 13	Track events	6:55 p.m.	5000 meters	Final Women
Saturday, June 13	Track events	7:21 p.m.	4×400m relay	Final Women
Saturday, June 13	Field events	11:30 a.m.	Discus	Final Women
Saturday, June 13	Field events	4:30 p.m.	High jump	Final Women
Saturday, June 13	Field events	5:10 p.m.	Triple jump	Final Women
Saturday, June 13	Heptathlon Women	2:30 p.m.	Long jump	Heptathlon Women
Saturday, June 13	Heptathlon Women	3:45 p.m.	Javelin	Heptathlon Women
Saturday, June 13	Heptathlon Women	6:43 p.m.	800 meters	Heptathlon Women

== See also ==
- NCAA Men's Division I Outdoor Track and Field Championships
- NCAA Women's Division I Outdoor Track and Field Championships
