= 2024 World Athletics U20 Championships – Men's 1500 metres =

Men's 1500 metres at the 2024 World Athletics U20 Championships
- Venue: Estadio Atlético de la VIDENA
- Dates: 28 August 2024 (heats); 31 August 2024 (final)
- Competitors: 43 from 28 nations
- Winning time: 3:40.51

Medalists
gold medal	Abdisa Fayisa	Ethiopia
silver medal	Cameron Myers	Australia
bronze medal	Alex Pintado	Spain

The men's 1500 metres at the 2024 World Athletics U20 Championships was held at the Estadio Atlético de la VIDENA in Lima, Peru on 28 and 31 August 2024.

== Records ==
U20 standing records prior to the 2024 World Athletics U20 Championships were as follows:

Record	Athlete & Nationality	Mark	Location	Date
World U20 Record	Ronald Kwemoi (KEN)	3:28.81	Monaco	18 July 2014
Championship Record	Abdelaati Iguider (MAR)	3:35.53	Grosseto, Italy	15 July 2004
World U20 Leading	Niels Laros (NED)	3:29.52	Paris, France	6 August 2024

== Results ==
=== Heats ===
The first 5 athletes in each heat (Q) qualified to the final.

==== Heat 1 ====
Rank	Athlete	Nation	Time	Notes
1	Josphat Kipkirui	Kenya	3:44.62	Q
2	Johannes Morepe	South Africa	3:45.10	Q
3	Håkon Moe Berg	Norway	3:45.40	Q
4	Aldin Ćatović	Serbia	3:45.66	Q, PB
5	Trent McFarland	United States	3:46.17	Q
6	Uriel Muñoz	Argentina	3:47.05	
7	Alex Riley	Great Britain	3:48.17	
8	Daniel Williams	Australia	3:48.55	
9	Lughaidh Mallon	Ireland	3:48.69	
10	Joshua Abraham	France	3:49.02	
11	Tobias Tent	Germany	3:51.25	
12	Mohamed Boutaguia	Algeria	3:52.03	
13	Kristers Kudlis	Latvia	3:55.99	
14	Liam Smith	Canada	3:56.51	

==== Heat 2 ====
Rank	Athlete	Nation	Time	Notes
1	Alex Pintado	Spain	3:44.62	Q
2	Abdisa Fayisa	Ethiopia	3:44.83	Q
3	George Couttie	Great Britain	3:44.84	Q
4	Carter Cutting	United States	3:44.95	Q
5	James McLeay	New Zealand	3:45.12	Q, PB
6	Koech Kibiwott	Kenya	3:45.15	
7	Manuel Zanini	Italy	3:45.27	
8	Justin Pretre	Canada	3:46.66	
9	Rui Mineiro	Portugal	3:48.67	
10	Elia Triaca	Switzerland	3:49.77	
11	Albert Szirbek	Hungary	3:51.25	
12	Mehdi Mlaouah	Tunisia	3:52.17	
13	Wyndel Beyde	Aruba	4:09.45	PB
14	Koki Terada	Japan	4:13.05	
–	Ayoub Elfakhar	Morocco	DNF	

==== Heat 3 ====
Rank	Athlete	Nation	Time	Notes
1	Cameron Myers	Australia	3:41.32	Q
2	Jaouad Khchina	Morocco	3:42.15	Q
3	Andreas Fjeld Halvorsen	Norway	3:43.81	Q
4	Nicola Baiocchi	Italy	3:43.83	Q, PB
5	Jacob Sande	Uganda	3:44.09	Q
6	Wanis Adjaoud	France	3:44.29	
7	Dumisani Motloung	South Africa	3:44.53	PB
8	Filip Toul	Czech Republic	3:45.03	
9	Andres Gonzalez	Spain	3:46.81	
10	Abdallah Harek	Algeria	3:46.85	
11	Sendel Musa	Ethiopia	3:48.86	
12	Gonzalo Gervasini	Uruguay	3:52.34	
13	Yanis Payraudeau	Switzerland	3:55.25	
14	David Scheller	Germany	3:57.40	

=== Final ===
Rank	Athlete	Nation	Time	Notes
1st place, gold medalist(s)	Abdisa Fayisa	Ethiopia	3:40.51	
2nd place, silver medalist(s)	Cameron Myers	Australia	3:40.60	
3rd place, bronze medalist(s)	Alex Pintado	Spain	3:41.03	
4	Josphat Kipkirui	Kenya	3:43.20	
5	Carter Cutting	United States	3:43.36	
6	Håkon Moe Berg	Norway	3:43.48	
7	Trent McFarland	United States	3:44.32	
8	Nicola Baiocchi	Italy	3:44.54	
9	Aldin Ćatović	Serbia	3:44.85	PB
10	Jaouad Khchina	Morocco	3:46.51	
11	George Couttie	Great Britain	3:47.42	
12	Jacob Sande	Uganda	3:48.11	
13	Andreas Fjeld Halvorsen	Norway	3:49.45	
14	James McLeay	New Zealand	3:50.63	
–	Johannes Morepe	South Africa	DNS	
