= Georgina Scoot =

British long-jumper

Personal information
- Born: 15 January 2004 (age 22)

Sport
- Sport: Athletics
- Event(s): Long jump, Triple jump

Achievements and titles
- Personal best(s): Long jump: 6.53 (2026); Triple jump: 13.67 (2026)

Georgina Scoot (born 15 January 2004) is a British long jump and triple jumper.

== Biography ==
From Devon, Scoot attended Torquay Girls' Grammar School and joined Torbay Athletics Club as a 12 year-old, and won her first British national title at under-15 level in the triple jump.

Scoot won national titles in the long jump and triple jump as an under-20 athlete, and was ranked number one in the UK at under-20 level in 2022 and 2023, winning in 2023 with a personal best jump of 12.84 metres. In 2022, she represented England at under-20 level in the triple jump. Via a scholarship she attended Princeton University from 2022 in the United States. In 2024, she won the Ivy League indoor championships titles in both long jump, with 6.28 metres and triple jump, with 13.03 metres.

Scoot won both the long jump and the triple jump at the Ivy League Outdoor Track & Field Championships in May 2025 with a personal best 6.51 metres in the long jump, and 13.36 metres in the triple jump and was named Most Outstanding Field Performer of the Meet. Scoot was selected to represent Great Britain at the 2025 European Athletics U23 Championships in Bergen, Norway, jumping 6.10 metres without advancing to the final. She finished in fifth place at the 2025 UK Athletics Championships in Birmingham with a best jump of 6.14 metres.

In January 2026, Scoot broke the Ivy League record in the triple jump with a leap of 13.47m at the 2026 Quaker Invite. That month, she represented England at the Reykjavík Games in Iceland, winning the long jump with 5.96 metres. In March, Scoot won The Ivy League Indoor Track & Field Championships with 13.23 metres, and qualified for the 2026 NCAA Division I Indoor Track and Field Championships, placing sixth overall in the triple jump with a personal best 13.49 metres. Competing outdoors in May, Scoot won the triple jump at the NCAA East Regionals with a personal best 13.67 metres. She qualified for the 2026 NCAA Outdoor Championships in both the long jump and triple jump.
