= Mustapha Bokpin =

Ghanaian sprinter (born 2004)

Personal information
- Full name: Mustapha Alufar Bokpin
- Born: 17 February 2004 (age 22)

Sport
- Sport: Athletics
- Event: Sprint

Achievements and titles
- Personal bests: 60m: 6.59 (2026); 100m: 9.94 (2026); 200m: 20.04 (2026)

Mustapha Alufar Bokpin (born 17 February 2004) is a Ghanaian sprinter, based in the United States.

== Biography ==
Bopkin ran a personal best for the 100 metres of 10.13 seconds at the Tennessee Invite on 5 April 2025. He competed at the 2025 World Athletics Relays in China in the Men's 4 × 100 metres relay in May 2025. On the second day of the competition he helped Ghana secure a qualifying place for the upcoming World Championships. Later that month, he ran 10.13 seconds again to place second to Barnabas Aggerh at the NAIA National Championships. Bokpin lowered his personal best for the 100 m to 10.09s (+1.4) in Powder Springs, Georgia on July 19, 2025, and the following month trained with the Ghanaian sprint relay team in Texas ahead of the 2025 World Championships.

In May 2026, he won the Conference USA in the 100 metres while competing for Middle Tennessee State University, where he recorded a personal best of 9.94 seconds (+0.7). He had another win in the 200 metres, setting another personal best time of 20.26 seconds (+1.6), with both times setting new meeting records. As a result, Bokpin was named The Conference USA men's Track Performer of the Year. Competing at the NCAA East Regional in Lexington, Kentucky on 29 May, he was runner-up to Kanyinsola Ajayi in 9.97 seconds for the 100 metres. Competing at the 2026 NCAA Outdoor Championships, he placed fourth in the 200 metres final in a personal best 20.04 seconds. He also placed sixth in the 100 metres final, running 9.99 seconds. In July, he was a semi-finalist in the 200 metres at the 2026 Commonwealth Games in Glasgow, Scotland. He also ran in the men's 4 × 100 m relay.
