= Kaia Tupu-South =

New Zealand shot putter (born 2002)

Personal information
- Born: 9 June 2002 (age 24)

Sport
- Sport: Athletics
- Event(s): Shot put, Discus throw

Achievements and titles
- Personal best(s): Shot Put 17.60m (Albuquerque, 2025); Discus: 54.52m (Fayetteville, 2024)

Kaia Tupu-South (born 9 June 2002) is a New Zealand shot puter and discus thrower. She won the 2021 New Zealand Athletics Championships title in the discus and competed at the 2025 World Athletics Indoor Championships in the shot put.

== Biography ==
From Auckland, she attended Westlake Girls High School. From a sporting family, her grandfather played NCAA basketball and her parents played basketball and boxed. Her brother, Trey, is a New Zealand champion boxer. Initially a multi-event athlete, after injury she switched to focus to the throwing events and won gold in the discus and silver in the shot put at the 2018 New Zealand Secondary Schools Championships in Dunedin.

After winning more schools titles in New Zealand between 2019 and 2021, she began an athletics scholarship to the University of Washington in Seattle, in the United States.

In 2021, she won New Zealand U20 titles in the shot put and discus. Later that year, she also won the senior New Zealand Athletics Championships title in the discus throw in Hastings, New Zealand, with a throw of 52.87 metres.

In March 2025, she was named in the New Zealand team for the 2025 World Athletics Indoor Championships in Nanjing, China, placing sixteenth overall in the shot put.

Tupu-South competed for the University of Louisville in the discus throw and placed second overall with a mark of 53.27 meters in May 2026 at the Atlantic Coast Conference Championships. She also placed second in the shot put at the championships with 17.56m. She subsequently qualified for the 2026 NCAA Outdoor Championships.
