= Hayley Kitching =

Australian middle-distance runner

Personal information
- Born: 26 September 2004 (age 22)

Sport
- Sport: Athletics
- Event: Middle-distance running

Hayley Kitching (born 26 September 2004) is an Australian middle-distance runner.

== Early life ==
Kitching is from Coffs Harbour in New South Wales, and attended Narranga Public School and Coffs Harbour Senior College. She was the Australian national champion in the Under-18 Girls 800 metres, as well as New South Wales champion over 800m and 1500 metres, although her junior running was interrupted by the Covid-19 pandemic. She later accepted a scholarship offer to study at Penn State University in the United States.

== Career ==
Kitching won the Australian U20 title over 800 metres in Sydney in March 2022. She was subsequently selected for the 2022 World Athletics U20 Championships, where she placed seventh over 800 metres in Cali, Colombia, in August 2022.

In March 2024, Kitching placed fourth over 800 metres at the NCAA Indoor Championships. In June, Kitching finished fifth over 800 metres at the 2024 NCAA Outdoor Championships. In February 2025, Kitching signed a name, image and likeness (NIL) contract with Brooks Running.

Kitching was selected to represent Australia at the 2025 Summer World University Games in Germany, where she was a semi-finalist in the 800 metres.

Competing for Penn State in January 2026, Kitching broke Zoe Buckman's Australian 1000m indoor national record with a time of 2:38.45 at the Nittany Lion Challenge. The time also broke the NCAA collegiate record. That month, she broke the school record for 800 metres indoors running 2:00.01 at the Penn State National Open. The following month, Kitching broke the meet record for the 800 metres at the Washington Indoor Husky Classic, running 1:59.22 to finish ahead of Rosemary Longisa. In February, Kitching also set a meet record of 2:00.55 in winning the 800 metres at the Big Ten Indoor Championships. Competing on 13 March at the 2026 NCAA Indoor Championships, Kitching fell just before the bell of her 800 metres preliminary heat, and although she got up and ran a 28.42 final lap, the fastest of the day by more than a second, she was too far adrift to qualify for the final.

Kitching was selected for the 800 metres at the 2026 World Athletics Indoor Championships in Toruń, Poland, in March 2026. At the Championships in Toruń, Poland, she advanced to the final of the 800 m after running 2:00.99 in her heat and winning her semi-final in 2:00.06, before placing fifth in the final in 2:00.50. In May, at the NCAA East Regionals, Kitching ran 1:59.15 to win her heat and qualify for the NCAA Outdoor Nationals. On 11 June, she won her semi-final at the 2026 NCAA Outdoor Championships in 1:59.46. In the final on 13 June, she placed second in a time of 1:57.65, faster than Athing Mu's previous NCAA record to move to second on the NCAA all-time list behind race winner Sanu Jallow. Kitching ran 1:59.66 for the 800 metres at the 2026 Prefontaine Classic.
