= Rosemary Longisa =

Kenyan middle-distance runner

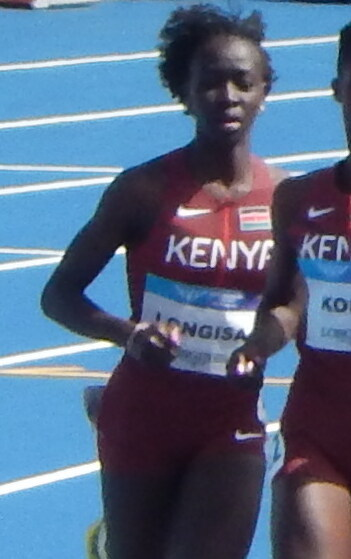

Personal information
- Nationality: Kenyan
- Born: 27 April 2005 (age 21)

Sport
- Sport: Athletics
- Events: Middle-distance running, Cross country running

Achievements and titles
- Personal bests: 800m: 1:59.71 (2026); 1500m: 4:13.59 (2025); Mile: 4:24.59 (2026); 3000m: 8:55.81 (2025)

Rosemary Longisa (born 27 April 2005) is a Kenyan middle-distance and cross country runner. She competes in the United States for the Washington State Cougars.

== Biography ==
Running for Washington State University in the United States, Longisa ran 2:10.28 seconds to win the 800 meters title at the MPSF Indoor Championships in Spokane in February 2025. In April, she ran a personal best for the 1500 metres of 4:13.59 at the 2025 Stanford Invitational in Palo Alto.

Competing in cross country running, Longisa was named the West Coast Conference Women's Cross Country Runner Of The Week after winning the Cougar Classic in September 2025. She won the award again later in the month after winning the 6k title at the Gans Creek Classic. The following month, she placed third at the Nuttycombe Invitational in Madison, Wisconsin. In November, she won the cross-country race at the 2025 NCAA West Regional Championships. On 22 November 2025, she was the first finisher for Washington State at the 2025 NCAA Cross Country Championships in Missouri.

In January 2026, at the UW Invitational in Seattle, Longisa ran the indoor mile run in a time of 4:24.59 to move to third on the NCAA all-time indoor list. That month, she also finished third in the 1000 meters in 2:38.26 at the Washington Indoor Preview in Seattle. In February, Longisa was runner-up to Hayley Kitching in the 800 metres at the Washington Indoor Husky Classic, running a personal best time of 1:59.71. On 14 March 2026, she was runner-up to defending champion Wilma Nielsen in the mile run at the 2026 NCAA Indoor Championships. Longisa competed at the 2026 World Athletics Indoor Championships in Toruń, Poland, without advancing to the semi-finals of the 800 metres.

In June 2026, Longisa won the 2026 NCAA Outdoor Championships over 1500 metres in 4:12.10, swiftly announcing afterwards a transfer to Iowa State University. That month, she placed third in the 1500 metres at the Kenyan Championships in 4:10.01. She was subsequently selected for the mile run as part of the Kenyan team for the 2026 Commonwealth Games in Glasgow, Scotland.
