= Simeon Birnbaum =

American long-distance runner

Personal information
- Born: 23 June 2005 (age 21)

Sport
- Sport: Athletics
- Events: Long-distance running, Middle-distance running

Achievements and titles
- Personal bests: 800m: 1:44.67 (2026); 1500m: 3:31.69 (2026); Mile: 3:52.81 (2025); 3000m: 7:39.65 (2025); 5000m: 13:19.73 (2026)
Medal record
Men's athletics
Representing United States
Pan American U20 Championships
Silver medal – second place	2023 Mayagüez	800 m

Simeon Birnbaum (born 23 June 2005) is an American middle- and long-distance runner who competes for the Oregon Ducks and won the 1500 metres race at the 2026 NCAA Outdoor Championships.

== Biography ==
Birnbaum was born in the state of Oregon but later lived in Alberta, Canada, prior to moving to Rapid City, South Dakota, where he attended Stevens High School. The son of a pastor, both his parents competed as runners in college, but he played ice hockey before focusing on track and field. In June 2022, he ran 3:59.51 in the mile run at the Brooks PR Invitational, becoming the first 16-year-old American to break four minutes at the distance. He was named the Gatorade state Player of the Year in 2022 and 2023 and set South Dakota state records in the 800 metres, 1,600 m, mile run, 3,200 m and in the sprint medley relay. He ran the second fastest 2-mile and 1500 metres time in U.S. high school history before winning the mile run at the 2023 Nike Outdoor Nationals, ahead of Rocky Hansen and Leo Young.

Birnbaum won a silver medal in the 800m run at the 2023 Pan American U20 Athletics Championships. That year, he started competing for the University of Oregon. Having missed a lot of 2024 with injury, he won the 2025 Big Ten 5000 metres race, setting a meet record and personal best time of 13:31.87. In December 2025, he broke the University of Oregon indoor 3,000 metres record at the Boston University Sharon Colyear-Danville Season Opener, running 7:39.65 seconds, breaking the previous Oregon school record of 7:40.51 set by Edward Cheserek in 2016.

Birnbaum won the 3000 metres and 5000 metres titles at the 2026 Big Ten Indoor Championships. Birnbaum also had the fastest anchor leg of the night, running 3:52.07 for 1600 metres, in the distance medley relay on 13 March at the 2026 NCAA Indoor Championships. He also placed second in the 3000 metres final the following day in 7:41.85, with his 27.01 last lap the fastest in a controversial race that saw the first man over the line, Habtom Samuel, disqualified post-race. That year, he signed a Name, Image and Likeness (NIL) contract with italian sportsbrand Diadora.

In April 2026, competing at the Oregon Team Invitational in Eugene, Birnbaum broke the NCAA 1500 m record by more than a second, running 3:31.69 to surpass the previous best set by Liam Murphy a year previously. The following month, he lowered his 800 m personal best to 1:44.67 at the Oregon Twilight. At the Big Ten Championships, he ran the last lap of the 1500 metres in 50.85 to win ahead of Trent McFarland in 4:00.98. On 12 June, Birnbaum won over 1500 metres at the 2026 NCAA Outdoor Championships in Eugene, with a time of 3:36.05 ahead of Trent McFarland and Gary Martin. He won by 1.13 seconds, the largest margin of victory in the race since Clayton Murphy in 2016.

In October 2026, he won on the cross-country course at the Bill Dellinger Invitational ahead of teammate Connor Burns.
