= South Carolina Gamecocks women's track and field =

South Carolina Gamecocks
- University: University of South Carolina
- Head coach: Tim Hall (2nd season)
- Conference: SEC
- Location: Columbia, South Carolina, US
- Indoor track: USC Indoor Facility
- Outdoor track: Weems Baskin Track Facility
- Nickname: Gamecocks
- Colors: Garnet and black

NCAA Outdoor National Championships
- 2002

NCAA Indoor Tournament Appearances
- 1996, 1997, 1998, 1999, 2000, 2001, 2002, 2003, 2004, 2005, 2006, 2007, 2008, 2009, 2010, 2011, 2012, 2013, 2014, 2016, 2017, 2018, 2019, 2021, 2022, 2023, 2024, 2025, 2026

NCAA Outdoor Tournament Appearances
- 1994, 1996, 1997, 1998, 1999, 2000, 2001, 2002, 2003, 2004, 2005, 2006, 2007, 2008, 2009, 2010, 2011, 2013, 2015, 2016, 2017, 2018, 2019, 2021, 2022, 2023, 2024, 2025, 2026

Conference Outdoor Championships
- 1999, 2002, 2005

The South Carolina Gamecocks women's track and field team represents the University of South Carolina and competes in the Southeastern Conference. The team has been coached by Tim Hall since 2023. The facilities continue to be improved, including the recent addition of 1,450 seats at outdoor track & field facility.

== Gamecocks in the Olympics ==
- Aliyah Abrams (2016, 2020, 2024 Guyana, 400 Metres)
- Aleen Bailey (2004 & 2008, Jamaica, 4 × 100 Metres Relay, 2004 Gold Medal)
- Miki Barber (2000, United States, 4 × 400 Metres Relay)
- Kierre Beckles (2016, Barbados, 400 Metres Hurdles)
- Lashinda Demus (2004 & 2012, United States, 400 Metres Hurdles, 2012 Gold Medal)
- Dawn Ellerbe (2000, United States, Hammer Throw)
- Michelle Fournier (2000 & 2004, Canada, Hammer Throw)
- Chelsea Hammond (2008, Jamaica, Long Jump, Bronze Medal)
- Natasha Hastings (2008, 2012 & 2016, United States, 4 × 400 Metres Relay, 2008 Gold Medal)
- Charmaine Howell (2000, Jamaica, 4 × 400 Metres Relay, Silver Medal)
- Mechelle Lewis (2008, United States, 4 × 100 Metres Relay)
- Wadeline Jonathas (4 × 400 Metres Relay, 2020 Gold Medal, 400 Metres)
- Lisa Misipeka (1996, 2000, & 2004, American Samoa, Hammer Throw & Shot Put)
- Jeanelle Scheper (2016, St. Lucia, High Jump)
- Shevon Stoddart (2004 & 2008, Jamaica, 400 Metres Hurdles)
- Tiffany Williams (2008, United States, 400 Metres Hurdles)
- Tonique Williams-Darling (2000 & 2004, The Bahamas, 400 Metres, 2004 Gold Medal)

== Year-by-year results ==
Season	Coach	Indoor Finish		Outdoor Finish		Notes
Season	Coach	Conference	National	Conference	National	Notes
Metro Conference
1989	Charlie Strong	—	—	6	—	
1990	Greg Kraft	—	—	2	—	
1991	Greg Kraft	—	—	5	—	
Southeastern Conference
1992	Greg Kraft	10	—	12	—	
1993	Greg Kraft	T-9	—	10	—	
1994	Greg Kraft	8	—	5	T-55	
1995	Greg Kraft	8	—	8	T-9	
1996	Greg Kraft	5	T-10	2	5	
1997	Curtis Frye	4	4	3	7	
1998	Curtis Frye	4	T-11	2	7	
1999	Curtis Frye	3	T-18	1	7	SEC Outdoor Champions
2000	Curtis Frye	3	2	2	T-6	National Indoor Runner-Up
2001	Curtis Frye	3	2	3	4	National Indoor Runner-Up
2002	Curtis Frye	4	4	1	1	SEC & National Outdoor Champions
2003	Curtis Frye	2	T-2	4	3	National Indoor Runner-Up
2004	Curtis Frye	5	T-10	4	T-7	
2005	Curtis Frye	5	5	1	T-2	SEC Outdoor Champions & National Runner-Up
2006	Curtis Frye	T-3	T-10	3	3	
2007	Curtis Frye	5	T-10	5	12	
2008	Curtis Frye	9	T-53	8	T-22	
2009	Curtis Frye	5	T-12	8	T-40	
2010	Curtis Frye	7	19	8	T-51	
2011	Curtis Frye	7	23	7	T-40	
2012	Curtis Frye	10	26	9	—	
2013	Curtis Frye	6	31	8	45	
2014	Curtis Frye	12	19	12	—	
2015	Curtis Frye	14	—	13	20	
2016	Curtis Frye	11	33	13	25	
2017	Curtis Frye	13	25	11	52	
2018	Curtis Frye	12	54	13	56	
2019	Curtis Frye	12	7	13	10	
2020	Curtis Frye	12	—	—	—	
2021	Curtis Frye	12	T-20	10	18	
2022	Curtis Frye	12	T-18	11	T-23	
2023	Curtis Frye	11	T-43	13	—	
2024	Tim Hall	11	12	10	15	
2025	Tim Hall	7	T-21	5	7	
2026	Tim Hall	5	8	4	T-15	
