= Texas Longhorns track and field =

Texas Longhorns track and field may refer to either the men's or women's track and field team at The University of Texas:

- Texas Longhorns men's track and field
- Texas Longhorns women's track and field
