= Trent McFarland =

American middle-distance runner (born 2005)

Personal information
- Born: 1 June 2005 (age 21)

Sport
- Sport: Athletics
- Events: Middle-distance running, Cross country running

Achievements and titles
- Personal bests: 800m: 1:47.22 (Ann Arbor, 2025); 1500m: 3:33.17 (Salem, 2026); Mile: 3:52.21 (Eugene, 2026); 3000m: 7:50.75 (Boston, 2026)

Trent McFarland (born 1 June 2005) is a American middle-distance runner.

== Early life ==
From Macomb County, Michigan, he attended Utica High School in Shelby Township, where he was state champion over 800 metres in consecutive years, before enrolling at the University of Michigan.

== Career ==
The USA 1500 meters U20 champion in 2024, McFarland ran for the United States at the 2024 World Athletics U20 Championships in Lima, Peru, placing seventh in the final of the 1500 meters.

Competing for the University of Michigan, McFarland was a finalist in the 1500 meters at the 2025 NCAA Division I Outdoor Track and Field Championships in Eugene, Oregon.

McFarland ran an indoor mile personal best of 3:52.73 at the Tyson Invitational in Fayetteville in January 2026. He subsequently won the mile run at the 2026 Big 10 Indoor Championships in February. Competing at the 2026 NCAA Indoor Championships the following month, he qualified for the final of the mile run with the seventh fastest time, before moving from last at the bell to place third in the final with the fastest lap in the race.

Competing outdoors in April 2026, he ran a personal best 3:33.17 for the 1500 m at the Wake Forest Invitational. That month, he ran the anchor leg in the 4 x 800 meters relay for Michigan at the Penn Relays, with McFarland outsprinting Penn State's Allon Clay on the home straight for the win, having run a split time of 1:46.12. At the 2026 Big Ten Championships, he ran the last lap of the 1500 meters in 51.15 seconds to place second to Simeon Birnbaum in 4:01.49. Competing at the NCAA East Regional in Lexington, Kentucky on 29 May, he ran a facility record of 3:38.04 for the 1500 metres. On 12 June, he placed second to Birmbaum over 1500 metres at the 2026 NCAA Outdoor Championships in Eugene, with a time of 3:37.18. In July, he ran a personal best 3:52.21 for the mile run at the 2026 Prefontaine Classic.
