= Carter Cutting =

American middle-distance runner (born 2005)

Personal information
- Born: 10 January 2005 (age 21)

Sport
- Sport: Athletics
- Event: Middle-distance running

Achievements and titles
- Personal bests: 800m: 1:48.53 (2025); 1500m: 3:34.34 (2026); Mile: 3:52.84 (2026); 3000m: 8:35.69 (2024)

Carter Cutting (born 10 January 2005) is an American middle-distance runner. He won the 2026 NCAA Indoor Championships in the mile run.

== Biography ==
Cutting lived in Wilsonville, Oregon, prior to moving to Utah in 2021. As a high school junior at Corner Canyon High School in 2022, he won the boys 800 metres race at the Pine View Invitational in Utah before also winning the 800 m at the Arcadia Invitational in California in a time of 1:51.55.

Although not a member of The Church of Jesus Christ of Latter-day Saints, he began to attend Brigham Young University after being impressed on a visit with the program led by head coach Ed Eyestone. In his freshman year, he ran the fifth best mark in program history in the indoor mile, and ran 3:42.81 for the 1500 metres at the Big 12 outdoor championships in 2024. Cutting was a finalist in tbe 1500 metres representing the United States at the 2024 World Athletics U20 Championships in Lima, Peru, placing fifth overall.

As a sophomore at BYU, Cutting achieved first-team All-American honours with the indoor distance medley relay team as they set a school-record time of 9:18.31. Cutting set a personal best as he broke the four-minute barrier for the mile run with a time of a 3:59.39 at the Robison Invitational in May 2025. In doing so, he became just the fifth runner in Utah history to break the four-minute mile in an outdoor race.

In February 2026, Cutting ran a personal best for the mile of 3:52.84 in Boston. He won the 2026 NCAA Indoor Championships in the mile run in Fayetteville, Arkansas on 14 March 2026, running for BYU. Having also run the distance medley relay, Cutting was the first man to win the mile title after running the DMR since Josh Kerr in 2018. In doing so, became BYU’s first NCAA indoor champion for 15 years. In May, Cutting won a tactical 1500 m at the Big 12 Outdoor Championships, closing with a final 400m in 51.48 seconds. Later that month, at the NCAA West Regionals in Fayetteville, Cutting ran a season's outdoor best 3:39.63 for the 1500 metres. In the preliminary round of the 2026 NCAA Championships Cutting ran a personal best 3:35.95 in his 1500m heat to reach the final, before having an eighth place finish in the final with a time of 3:38.10. He ran an outdoor personal best in the mile at the 2026 Prefontaine Classic. On 11 July, Cutting ran a 1500 m personal best of 3:34.34 at the Sound Running Sunset Tour.
