= Jane Hedengren =

American track and field athlete (born 2006)

- Hedengren competing for BYU in 2025

Personal information
- Born: September 23, 2006 (age 20) Houston, Texas, U.S.
- Education: Timpview High School; Brigham Young University

Sport
- Sport: Athletics
- Events: Middle-distance, Long-distance
- College team: BYU Cougars
- Coached by: Diljeet Taylor

Achievements and titles
- Personal bests: 1500 m: 4:04.68+ (St. Louis 2025); 1600 m: 4:21.81+ (St. Louis 2025); Mile: 4:22.22i (Boston 2026); 3000 m: 8:34.98i (New York 2026); 3200 m: 9:14.65+ (Seattle 2025); 2 Mile: 9:17.75 (Seattle 2025); 5000 m: 14:44.79i NCAA Record (Boston 2025); 5000 m: 14:50.50 NCAA Record (Azusa 2026); 10000 m: 30:46.80 NCAA Record (Stanford 2026)

Jane Hedengren (born September 23, 2006) is an American middle- and long-distance runner. She competes for the BYU Cougars based in Provo, Utah.

Hedengren has won two individual NCAA championships and holds three NCAA records (indoor and outdoor 5000 m, and outdoor 10000 m). Prior to college, she broke nine national high school records, including the indoor and outdoor mile, the outdoor two-mile, and both the indoor and outdoor 5000 meters.

== High school career ==
Hedengren attended Timpview High School in Provo, Utah from 2021 to 2025. She comes from a family with a strong running background. Her father, John D. Hedengren, was an All-American runner. In 2024, Hedengren committed to Brigham Young University.

=== 2023 ===
In June, as a sophomore, Hedengren won the girls' mile at the Brooks PR Invitational in Seattle, Washington, setting a meet record and personal best with a time of 4:35.69. Later that month, she competed at the Nike Outdoor Nationals in Eugene, Oregon, winning the two-mile title with a time of 9:54.38, breaking the U.S. sophomore class record. In September, as a junior, she ran the fastest three-mile ever by a high school girl in U.S. history, finishing in 15:32.

=== 2024 ===
In May, Hedengren set a new Utah state record in the 1600 meters with a time of 4:37.72 at the BYU Invitational. In June, she won the Nike Outdoor National two-mile title in Eugene. In November, she ran the fastest 5 kilometers ever recorded in high school girls cross country history, finishing in 15:50.01 at the Nike Cross Regionals Southwest. In December, she won the Nike Cross Nationals girls' championship race in Portland, Oregon, setting a new course record with a time of 16:32.7. The previous course record of 16:37.8 was set in 2018 by Katelyn Tuohy of North Rockland High School in New York.

=== 2025 ===
In February, Hedengren set a 3200 meter meet record at the Simplot Games in Pocatello, Idaho with a time of 9:37.50. This performance stood as #2 all-time, behind Mary Cain's two-mile indoor high school record. In March, at the Nike Indoor Nationals, Hedengren set a new high school short track 5000 meters record and a new under-20 American record, with a time of 15:13.26, surpassing the previous record of 15:28.90 set by Elizabeth Leachman. Three days later at the same meet, she captured the national high school record in the short track mile with a time of 4:26.14.

Hedengren setting the national high school 2-mile record at the 2025 Arcadia Invitational

In April, Hedengren set a high school national record in the two-mile at the Arcadia Invitational, with a time of 9:34.12. Later that month, at the Bryan Clay Invite, she broke the high school outdoor 5000 meters record, with a time of 14:57.93. In setting this record, Hedengren broke Elizabeth Leachman's former high school record of 15:25.27 by almost 30 seconds, and became the first high school athlete to break the 15 minute barrier. On June 5, Hedengren broke Sadie Engelhardt's high school mile record of 4:28.46 by almost five seconds, clocking 4:23.50. At 1500 meters, she split 4:04.68, which was just 0.06 seconds off Mary Cain's 1500 meter high school record of 4:04.62. At 1600 meters, she split 4:21.81, according to her MileSplit profile, which stands as a new high school record. On June 8, at the Brooks PR Invitational, Hedengren broke her own two-mile high school national record, with a time of 9:17.75. En route, she split 8:40.99 at 3000 meters and 9:14.65 at 3200 meters. On June 21, at the Nike Outdoor Nationals, she lowered her 3000 meter U20 and High School National record to 8:40.03 in her final high school race.

== Collegiate career ==
=== 2025 ===
On October 17, in her first race competing for the BYU Cougars, Hedengren set a course record over the 6 kilometer distance in the Pre-National Invitational, running 18:42.3. She split 15:36 at 5 kilometers. On October 31, Hedengren won the individual title at the Big 12 Championship 6,000-metre race in 18:29.60, setting a new conference course record and leading BYU Cougars to a third straight Big 12 team title. At the NCAA Mountain Regional on November 14, Hedengren won the women’s 6-kilometer title in 19:06.6, finishing more than 40 seconds ahead of the field and helping BYU secure an automatic berth to the NCAA Championships. One week later, she placed second at the NCAA Division I Cross Country Championships in 18:38.9, the fastest freshman performance in meet history, contributing to BYU’s runner-up finish in the team standings.

On December 6, at the 2025 BU Season Opener meeting, Hedengren broke Parker Valby's collegiate record in the 5000 meters, running 14:44.79. Her time is the second fastest ever run indoors by an American woman.

Hedengren helped BYU open the 2026 indoor season with the distance medley relay performance at the BYU December Invite on December 10, 2025. Racing on the anchor 1600-metre leg, she joined Riley Chamberlain, Sami Oblad, and Tessa Buswell as BYU ran 10:41.85 in the DMR as one of the top early-season indoor marks.

=== 2026 ===
In February 2026, Hedengren placed third in 8:34.98 at the women’s 3000m at the Millrose Games. Her time was the second-fastest in NCAA history, behind race winner Doris Lemngole who won in 8:31.39 and set the collegiate record.

In March 2026, Hedengren was named the Big 12 women’s indoor track and field outstanding freshman after breaking the NCAA indoor 5000 m record (14:44.79), running the second-fastest collegiate indoor 3000 m (8:34.98) and third-fastest indoor mile (4:22.22), and winning the conference 3000 m title in 8:46.11. At the NCAA Indoor Championships, she won the 5000 m in 15:00.12, breaking the Randal Tyson Track Center facility record, and the 3000 m in 8:36.61, setting a meet record. Her victories made her the first freshman to win both events at the same NCAA indoor meet and the first BYU woman to capture two individual titles at a single NCAA championship.

In April 2026, Hedengren set the NCAA record in the outdoors 10,000 meters at the Stanford Invitational. She ran it in 30:46.80, breaking the record by almost four seconds. Later that month, she also set a new outdoors NCAA record in the 5,000 meters at Bryan Clay with a 14:50.50 performance.

== Awards and recognition ==
=== College ===
- 2× NCAA Champion (2026 Individual Indoor 3000 m, 2026 Individual Indoor 5000 m)
- USTFCCCA National Women’s Track Athlete of the Year (2026)
- Big 12 Women’s Runner of the Year (2025)
- Big 12 Women’s Newcomer of the Year (2025)

=== High School ===
- Gatorade Female Athlete of the Year (2025)
- 2× Gatorade National Girls Player of the Year (Cross Country 2025, Track and Field 2024)
- 2× Deseret News Female Athlete of the Year (2024, 2025)
- 3× USATF Athlete of the Week (December 2024, June 2025, October 2025)
- 3× COROS MileSplit50 Athlete of the Year (Cross Country 2025, Indoor 2025, Outdoor 2025)
