= Sadie Engelhardt =

American track and field athlete (born 2006)

Personal information
- Nationality: American
- Born: August 21, 2006 (age 19)

Sport
- Sport: Athletics
- Event(s): 800m, 1000m, 1500m, Mile

Achievements and titles
- Personal bests: All per World Athletics profile: 800m: 2:02.31 (2026); 1000m: 2:41.00i (2024); 1500m: 4:07.00 i (2026); Mile: 4:23.84i (2026); 3200m: 9:50.69 (2022)

Sadie Engelhardt (born August 21, 2006) is an American track and field athlete. She is the former American record holder for the high school mile.

== High school career ==
Engelhardt attended Ventura High School and finished her high school career with CIF records in the indoor 1000 m, alongside the outdoor 1500 m, 1600 m, and mile. She had been named the Gatorade Player of the Year for the state of California in cross country and track and field in 2022, 2023, and 2024. She was also named Gatorade's national player of the year in girls track and field in 2024.

As a freshman, she finished second in the New Balance Nationals Indoor mile to senior Juliette Whittaker. Outdoors, she competed at the CIF California State Meet State Championships, where she finished second in the 800 m and won the 1600 m. She finished off the year competing at the Brooks PR invitational, where she finished second in the mile to Juliette Whittaker for a second time that year before winning the mile at Nike Outdoor Nationals.

In her sophomore season, Engelhardt returned to the New Balance Indoor Nationals, winning the mile in a time of 4:38.65. She then won the New Balance Outdoor Nationals mile in 4:38.96. At the CIF California State Meet State Championships, she won the 800 m and defended her title in the 1600 m.

Engelhardt started her junior season of indoor track at Boston University, where she ran the 1000 m, just missing the national high school record of 2:39.41 by running 2:41.00. She then won the high school mile at the New Balance Indoor Grand Prix, in a time of 4:32.66, alongside the New Balance Indoor Nationals mile a month later. Outdoors, she won her third consecutive CIF California State Meet state title in the 1600 m. At the Hoka Festival of Miles, she set a high school national record in the outdoor mile of 4:28.46. This record stood until 2025, when Jane Hedengren ran 4:23.50. She again won the mile at New Balance Outdoor Nationals, and later raced at the 2024 U.S. Olympic Trials, where she placed 38th in the 1500 m in a time of 4:19.66.

In her senior season, Engelhardt finished her CIF cross country career by winning her third straight division two state championship. In December 2024, Englehardt decided not to compete with her school team and instead race at more professional meets as an unattached athlete. On February 8, 2025, Engelhardt competed in the women's Wanamaker Mile at the Millrose Games, where she broke Mary Cain's indoor high school national record of 4:28.25, running 4:27.97. This record stood until 2025, when Jane Hedengren ran 4:26.14.

== Collegiate career ==
In March 2024 Engelhardt committed to competing collegially at NC State after also visiting Oregon, Stanford and Virginia.

On September 4, 2025, Engelhardt signed a NIL deal with Brooks.
