= List of United States junior records in athletics =

United States Junior records in athletics are the best marks set in an event by an athlete who holds American citizenship and who has not yet reached their 20th birthday in the given year of competition. As of August 2018 these records are not exclusive to athletes who compete for the United States in international competition. Official records are kept and ratified by United States Track and Field.

== Outdoor ==
Key: Awaiting ratification Record not kept by USATF Not ratified or later rescinded by USATF

=== Men ===
Event	Record	Athlete	Date	Meet	Place	Age	Ref.	Video
100 m
100 m	9.93 (+1.6 m/s)	Christian Miller	20 April 2024	PURE Athletics Spring Invitational	Clermont, United States	17 years, 340 days		
100 m	9.92 (+1.1 m/s)	Tate Taylor	3 May 2025	UIL State Championships	Austin, United States	17 years, 219 days		
100 m	9.92 (+1.8 m/s)	Maurice Gleaton	1 August 2025	USA Championships	Eugene, United States	18 years, 248 days		
200 m	19.69 (−0.3 m/s)	Erriyon Knighton	26 June 2022	USA Championships	Eugene, United States	18 years, 148 days		
200 m	19.49 (+1.4 m/s)	Erriyon Knighton	30 April 2022	LSU Invitational	Baton Rouge, United States	18 years, 91 days		
300 m	32.49	Henry Thomas	23 July 1985		Edinburgh, United Kingdom	18 years, 13 days		
400 m	43.87	Steve Lewis	September 28, 1988	Olympic Games	Seoul, Korea	19 years, 135 days		
800 m	1:43.55	Donavan Brazier	June 10, 2016	NCAA Division I Championships	Eugene, United States	19 years, 56 days		
800 m	1:42.27	Cooper Lutkenhaus	August 3, 2025	USA Championships	Eugene, United States	16 years, 227 days		
800 m	1:42.08	Cooper Lutkenhaus	10 June 2026	Bislett Games	Oslo, Norway	17 years, 173 days		
1000 m	2:16.46	Hobbs Kessler	August 10, 2022	Herculis	Stade Louis II, Monaco	19 years, 147 days		
1500 m	3:34.36	Hobbs Kessler	29 May 2021	Portland Track Festival	Portland, United States	18 years, 74 days		
Mile	3:51.3	Jim Ryun	July 17, 1966		Berkeley United States	19 years, 79 days		
3000 m	7:49.16	Galen Rupp	17 July 2005		Lignano Sabbiadoro, Italy	19 years, 70 days		
5000 m	13:24.26	Nico Young	23 April 2021	Drake Relays	Des Moines United States	18 years, 270 days		
5000 m	13:18.95	Cole Hocker	12 June 2021	NCAA Division I Championships	Eugene United States	19 years, 6 days		
10,000 m	28:15.52	Galen Rupp	7 May 2005	Oregon Twilight Meet	Eugene United States	18 years, 364 days		
10 km (road),	28:56	Colin Baker	15 November 2019	NCAA Division I Northeast Region Cross Country Championships	Buffalo, United States	Exact age unknown		
Marathon	2:15:28	Paul Gompers	10 December 1983		Huntsville, Alabama, United States	19 years, 309 days		
Marathon	2:12:47	Riley Nedrow	15 December 2024	Tucson Marathon	Tucson, United States	19 years, 273 days		
3000 m steeplechase	8:33.8	John Gregorek	May 20, 1979	Penn Relays	Philadelphia United States	19 years, 35 days		
110 m hurdles (99 cm)	13.05 (−0.5 m/s)	Ja'Kobe Tharp	30 August 2024	World Athletics U20 Championships	Lima, Peru	18 years, 335 days		
110 m hurdles (99 cm)	13.04 (+0.2 m/s)	Ja'Shaun Lloyd	19 June 2026	USATF U20 Outdoor Championships	Eugene, United States	19 years, 92 days		
110 m hurdles (99 cm)	12.95 (−0.6 m/s)	Leezra Brown	19 June 2026	USATF U20 Outdoor Championships	Eugene, United States	19 years, 105 days		
110 m hurdles (99 cm)	12.72 (+0.7 m/s)	Le'Ezra Brown	8 August 2026	World U20 Championships	Eugene, United States	19 years, 155 days		
110 m hurdles (106.7 cm)	13.18 (+0.4 m/s)	Ja'Kobe Tharp	11 May 2024	SEC Championships	Gainesville, United States	18 years, 224 days		
110 m hurdles (106.7 cm)	13.18 (+0.2 m/s)	Ja'Kobe Tharp	5 June 2024	NCAA Division I Championships	Eugene, United States	18 years, 249 days		
300 m hurdles	34.72	Andrew Jones	17 April 2026	UIL 6A Area Championships	Tomball, United States			
400 m hurdles	47.85	Sean Burrell	11 June 2021	NCAA Division I Championships	Eugene, United States	19 years, 108 days		
High jump	2.31 m (7 ft 6 3/4 in)	Andra Manson	July 18, 2002	World Junior Championships	Kingston, Jamaica	18 years, 79 days		
Pole vault	6.05 m (19 ft 10 in)	Armand Duplantis (Note: Armand Duplantis is a dual citizen of Sweden and USA. He has been competing for Sweden since 2015. All performances by US citizens count for US records.)	August 12, 2018	European Championships	Berlin, Germany	18 years, 275 days		
Long jump	8.34 m (27 ft 4 1/4 in) (+0.0 m/s)	Randy Williams	September 8, 1972	Olympic Games	München, Germany	19 years, 16 days		
Triple jump	17.19 m (56 ft 4 3/4 in) (+0.4 m/s)	Will Claye	June 13, 2009	NCAA Championships	Fayetteville, United States	18 years, 0 days		
Shot put (6 kg)	22.06 m (72 ft 4 1/2 in)	Adrian Piperi	July 10, 2018	World U20 Championships	Tampere, Finland	19 years, 171 days		
Shot put (7.26 kg)	20.65 m (67 ft 8 3/4 in)	Michael Carter	4 July 1979		Boston, United States	18 years, 248 days		
Discus throw (1.75 kg)	65.34 m (214 ft 4 1/4 in)	Mason Finley	July 31, 2009	Pan American Junior Championships	Port of Spain, Trinidad and Tobago	18 years, 295 days		
Discus throw (2 kg)	63.22 m (207 ft 4 3/4 in)	Brian Milne	March 28, 1992		State College, United States	19 years, 81 days		
Hammer throw (6 kg)	80.79 m (265 ft 1/2 in)	Conor McCullough	July 25, 2010	World Junior Championships	Moncton, Canada	19 years, 175 days		
Hammer throw (7.26 kg)	73.73 m (241 ft 10 3/4 in)	Walter Henning	24 May 2008	High Performance Sprint and Power Meet	Provo, United States	19 years, 121 days		
Javelin throw	77.84 m (255 ft 4 1/2 in)	Sam Crouser	11 June 2010 (Note: by World Athletics source; 12 June 2010 by USATF source)	Portland Track Festival	Portland, United States	18 years, 163 days		
Decathlon (junior)	8018 pts	Gunnar Nixon	July 11, 2012	World Junior Championships	Barcelona, Spain	19 years, 180 days		
Decathlon (junior)	100m (wind) / Long jump (wind) / Shot put / High jump / 400m / 110m H (wind) / Discus / Pole vault / Javelin / 1500m; 11.23 (−0.1 m/s) / 7.12m (−0.2 m/s) / 14.54m / 2.10m / 49.13 / 14.54 (−0.7 m/s) / 42.23m / 4.50m / 56.25m / 4:22.36							
Decathlon	7892 pts	Gunnar Nixon	June 7, 2012	NCAA Championships	Des Moines, United States	19 years, 156 days		
Decathlon	100m (wind) / Long jump (wind) / Shot put / High jump / 400m / 110m H (wind) / Discus / Pole vault / Javelin / 1500m; 10.93 (+3.0 m/s) / 7.25m (−1.4 m/s) / 13.73m / 2.05m / 48.92 / 14.51 (+1.0 m/s) / 36.48m / 4.60m / 56.12m / 4:30.41							
10,000 m walk (track)	41:23.14	Tyler Sorensen	July 9, 2011	World Youth Championships	Lille, France	17 years, 141 days		
10 km walk (road)	41:35+	Trevor Barron	June 26, 2011		Eugene United States	18 years, 269 days		
20 km walk (road)	1:23:26	Trevor Barron	June 26, 2011	USA Championships	Eugene United States	18 years, 269 days		
4 × 100 m relay	38.62 A	Arian Smith; Justin Ofotan; Marcellus Moore; Matthew Boling	20 July 2019	Pan American U20 Championships	San José, Costa Rica	17 years, 282 days 19 years, 123 days 17 years, 20 days 19 years, 0 days		
4 × 100 m relay	38.16	Blake Hamilton; Dillon Mitchell; Kyler Brown; Tate Taylor	9 August 2026	World U20 Championships	Eugene, United States	18 years, 347 days 16 years, 248 days 19 years, 183 days 18 years, 317 days		
4 × 400 m relay	2:59.30 A	Frederick Lewis; Matthew Boling; Matthew Moorer; Justin Robinson	July 21, 2019	Pan American U20 Championships	San José, Costa Rica	19 years, 1 day 19 years, 155 days 17 years, 113 days		

=== Women ===
Event	Record	Athlete	Date	Meet	Place	Age	Ref.
100 m	10.75 (+1.6 m/s)	Sha'Carri Richardson	8 June 2019	NCAA Division I Championships	Austin, United States	19 years, 75 days	
200 m	22.08 (+1.0 m/s)	JaMeesia Ford	8 June 2024	NCAA Division I Championships	Eugene, United States	19 years, 132 days	
300 m	37.08	Symone Mason	11 February 2017	Hallandale All-Comers Meet	Hallandale Beach, United States	17 years, 164 days	
400 m	49.57	Athing Mu	12 June 2021	NCAA Division I Championships	Eugene, United States	19 years, 4 days	
600 m	1:25.22	Sophia Gorriaran	30 April 2022	Penn Relays	Philadelphia, United States	16 years, 314 days	
800 m	1:55.04	Athing Mu	21 August 2021	Prefontaine Classic	Eugene, United States	19 years, 74 days	
1500 m	4:03.39	Alexa Efraimson	30 May 2015		Eugene, United States	18 years, 99 days	
Mile	4:35.24	Polly Plumer	May 16, 1982		Westwood, United States	17 years, 214 days	
Mile	4:23.50	Jane Hedengren	5 June 2025	HOKA Festival of Miles	St. Louis, United States	18 years, 255 days	
Mile	4:33.87	Katelyn Tuohy	June 17, 2018	New Balance Nationals	Greensboro, United States	16 years, 91 days	
3000 m	8:57.27	Cecilia Hopp	26 June 1982		Durham, United States	19 years, 176 days	
3000 m	8:55.0+ h	Jane Hedengren	12 April 2025	Arcadia Invitational	Arcadia, United States	18 years, 201 days	
3000 m	8:40.99+	Jane Hedengren	8 June 2025	Brooks PR Invitational	Renton, United States	18 years, 258 days	
3000 m	8:40.03	Jane Hedengren	21 June 2025	Nike Outdoor Nationals	Eugene, United States	18 years, 271 days	
Two miles	9:17.75	Jane Hedengren	8 June 2025	Brooks PR Invitational	Renton, United States	18 years, 258 days	
5000 m	15:25.93	Natalie Cook	1 April 2022	Stanford Invitational	Stanford, United States	18 years, 322 days	
5000 m	15:25.27	Elizabeth Leachman	28 March 2024	Texas Relays	Austin, United States	16 years, 14 days	
5000 m	14:57.93	Jane Hedengren	17 April 2025	Bryan Clay Invitational	Azusa, United States	18 years, 206 days	
10,000 m	32:51.20	Lindsey Scherf	7 May 2005		New York, New York, United States	18 years, 231 days	
10,000 m	32:20.60	Ruth White	12 June 2025	NCAA Division I Championships	Eugene, United States	18 years, 231 days	
10,000 m	32:08.83	Rylee Blade	11 June 2026	NCAA Division I Championships	Eugene, United States	18 years, 350 days	
10 km (road)	34:18	Allison Woodward	11 June 2011	Bellin Run	Green Bay, United States	18 years, 148 days	
Half marathon	1:13:04	Kelly Cordell	3 February 2002	Las Vegas Half Marathon	Las Vegas, United States	18 years, 183 days	
Marathon	2:31:49	Tierney Wolfgram	7 November 2020	Parkway Marathon	Sacramento, United States	17 years, 181 days	
100 m hurdles	12.74 (+1.7 m/s) (Note: ratified but to no doping control)	Dior Hall	13 June 2015	NCAA Division I Championships	Eugene, United States	19 years, 162 days	
300 m hurdles	38.90	Sydney McLaughlin	April 8, 2017	Arcadia Invitational	Arcadia, United States	17 years, 244 days	
400 m hurdles	52.75 (Note: Mark was not ratified by World Athletics (known then as the IAAF) as a world under-20 record due to the lack of false start detection.)	Sydney McLaughlin	May 13, 2018	SEC Championships	Knoxville, United States	18 years, 279 days	
2000 m steeplechase	6:18.41	Angelina Napoleon	10 June 2023	NYSPHSAA NY State Meet	Middletown, United States	18 years, 99 days	
3000 m steeplechase	9:46.48	Madison Boreman	June 10, 2017	NCAA Division I Championships	Eugene, United States	18 years, 335 days	
High jump	1.99 m (6 ft 6 1/4 in)	Vashti Cunningham	June 23, 2017	USA Championships	Sacramento, California, United States	19 years, 156 days	
Pole vault	4.65 m (15 ft 3 in)	Hana Moll	21 August 2023	World Championships	Budapest, Hungary	18 years, 202 days	
Long jump	6.86 m (22 ft 6 in) (+0.1 m/s)	Alyssa Jones	8 June 2023	NCAA Division I Championships	Austin, United States	19 years, 122 days	
Long jump	6.86 m (22 ft 6 in) (+1.0 m/s)	Sophia Beckmon	4 May 2024	Fighting Illini Tune-Up	Champaign, United States	18 years, 261 days	
Triple jump	14.15 m (46 ft 5 in)	Keturah Orji	June 13, 2015	NCAA Division I Championships	Eugene, United States	19 years, 100 days	
Shot put	18.35 m (60 ft 2 1/4 in)	Raven Saunders	June 11, 2015 (Note: by World Athletics source; 13 June 2023 by USATF source, a typo)	NCAA Division I Championships	Eugene, United States	19 years, 27 days	
Discus throw	65.93 m (216 ft 3 1/2 in)	Shelbi Vaughan	June 15, 2012	NCAA Division I Championships	Bloomington, United States	17 years, 296 days	
Hammer throw	68.12 m (223 ft 5 3/4 in)	Shelby Ashe	June 16, 2012	NCAA Division I Championships	Bloomington, United States	19 years, 95 days	
Javelin throw	56.59 m (185 ft 7 3/4 in)	Madison Wiltrout	7 May 2015	North Huntingdon WPIAL AAA Qualifier	North Huntingdon, United States	16 years, 31 days	
Heptathlon	6018	Kendell Williams	April 12, 2014		Boise, United States	18 years, 302 days	
Heptathlon	100m H (wind) / High jump / Shot put / 200m (wind) / Long jump (wind) / Javelin / 800m; 13.32 (+1.0 m/s) / 1.83 m / 12.59 m / 24.58 (−0.5 m/s) / 5.93 m (±0.0 m/s) / 38.15 m / 2:18.86						
3000 m walk (track)	13:28.00	Taylor Ewert	17 April 2019	Penn Relays	Philadelphia, United States	17 years, 147 days	
5000 m walk (track)	22:28.61	Taylor Ewert	27 April 2019	Penn Relays	Philadelphia, United States	17 years, 157 days	
5 km walk (road)	23:08	Taylor Ewert	10 August 2018		Toronto, Canada	16 years, 262 days	
10,000 m walk (track)	45:57.81	Taylor Ewert	July 14, 2018	World U20 Championships	Tampere, Finland	16 years, 235 days	
10 km walk (road)	48:03	Maria Michta	May 8, 2005	Pan American Race Walking Cup	Lima, Peru	18 years, 319 days	
15 km walk (road)	1:13:50+	Taylor Ewert	30 June 2019		Oswego, United States	17 years, 221 days	
20 km walk (road)	1:38:55	Taylor Ewert	30 June 2019		Oswego, United States	17 years, 221 days	
4 × 100 m relay	42.88	Kaila Jackson; Camryn Dickson; Avery Lewis; Shawnti Jackson	5 August 2023 (Note: by official result source; 5 July 2023 by Track & Field News source, a typo)	Pan American U20 Championships	Mayagüez, Puerto Rico	19 years, 36 days 19 years, 52 days 17 years, 227 days 18 years, 95 days	
4 × 400 m relay	3:24.04 A	Alexis Holmes; Kimberly Harris; Ziyah Holman; Kayla Davis	July 21, 2019	Pan American U20 Championships	San José, Costa Rica	19 years, 174 days 17 years, 10 days 17 years, 201 days 15 years, 212 days	

=== Mixed ===
Event	Record	Athlete	Date	Meet	Place	Age	Ref.
4 × 100 m relay	41.39	Cy Lugo; Ahlayna Taylor; Nicholas Altheimer; Ava Kitchings	8 August 2026	World U20 Championships	Eugene, United States	18 years, 9 days 16 years, 276 days 19 years, 136 days 18 years, 161 days	
4 × 400 m relay	3:17.69 A	Charlie Batholomew; Madison Whyte; Will Sumner; Kennedy Wade	2 August 2022	World U20 Championships	Cali, Colombia		
4 × 400 m relay	3:15.31	Joshua Shelton; Taylor-Nicole Overton; Jaelen Hunter; Olivia Harris	5 August 2026	World U20 Championships	Eugene, United States	18 years, 37 days 17 years, 68 days 17 years, 70 days 17 years, 273 days	

== Indoor ==
=== Men ===
Event	Record	Athlete	Date	Meet	Place	Age	Ref.
55 m	6.07	Leonard Scott	February 20, 1999		Gainesville, United States	19 years, 32 days	
60 m	6.52	D'Angelo Cherry	March 1, 2009	US Indoor Championships	Boston, Massachusetts United States	18 years, 212 days	
200 m	20.37	Walter Dix	March 11, 2005	NCAA Indoor Championships	Fayetteville, Arkansas United States	19 years, 39 days	
300 m	32.49	Jacory Patterson	January 11, 2019	Virginia Tech Invitational	Blacksburg, United States	18 years, 343 days	
400 m	44.93	LaShawn Merritt	February 11, 2005		Fayetteville, Arkansas United States	18 years, 229 days	
600 m	1:14.15	Cooper Lutkenhaus	1 February 2026	Millrose Games	New York City, United States	17 years, 44 days	
800 m
800 m	1:45.24	Brandon Miller	26 February 2022		College Station United States	20 years, 56 days	
800 m	1:45.23	Cooper Lutkenhaus	24 January 2026	Dr. Sander Invitational	New York City, United States	17 years, 36 days	
800 m	1:44.03	Cooper Lutkenhaus	14 February 2026	Sound Invite	Winston-Salem, United States	17 years, 57 days	
1000 m	2:19.53	Robby Creese	14 January 2012		University Park, Pennsylvania United States	18 years, 137 days	
1500 m	3:41.17+	Hobbs Kessler	6 February 2022	New Balance Indoor Grand Prix	Staten Island, United States	18 years, 328 days	
Mile	3:55.02	German Fernandez	February 28, 2009		College Station, Texas United States	18 years, 87 days	
3000 m	7:52.39	Parker Wolfe	5 February 2022		Winston-Salem, United States	18 years, 193 days	
3000 m	7:50.06 OT	Grant Fisher	12 February 2016	Husky Classic	Seattle, United States	18 years, 296 days	
3000 m	7:47.97 OT	German Fernandez	14 February 2009	Husky Classic	Seattle, United States	18 years, 104 days	
5000 m	13:19.73	Parker Wolfe	3 December 2022	Sharon Colyear-Danville Season Opener	Boston, United States	19 years, 129 days	
50 m hurdles (106.7 cm)	6.73	Marcell Almond	February 19, 2000		Los Angeles, United States		
55m hurdles (99/100 cm)	6.88+	Trey Cunningham	March 12, 2017	New Balance National Scholastic Championships	New York City, United States	18 years, 198 days	
55 m hurdles (106.7 cm)	7.04	Kurt Powdar	January 26, 2019	Bullis Speed Invitational	New York City, United States	17 years, 329 days	
60m hurdles (99/100 cm)	7.40	Trey Cunningham	March 12, 2017	New Balance National Scholastic Championships	New York City, United States	18 years, 198 days	
60m hurdles (106.7 cm)	7.55	Leonard Mustari	11 February 2022		Clemson, United States	19 years, 29 days	
High jump	2.29 m (7 ft 6 in)	Kenny Evans	March 13, 1998		Indianapolis, Indiana, United States	18 years, 341 days	
Pole vault	5.88 m (19 ft 3 1/4 in)	Armand Duplantis	February 25, 2018		Clermont-Ferrand, France	18 years, 107 days	
Long jump	8.09 m (26 ft 6 1/2 in)	Dion Bentley	February 18, 1989		University Park, United States	17 years, 176 days	
Triple jump	16.98 m (55 ft 8 1/2 in)	Christian Taylor	March 14, 2009		College Station, United States	18 years, 269 days	
Shot put (6 kg)	21.89 m (71 ft 9 3/4 in)	Jordan Geist	February 7, 2017		Greensburg, United States	18 years, 201 days	
Shot put (7.26 kg)	21.05 m (69 ft 1/2 in)	Terry Albritton	February 22, 1974		New York City, United States	19 years, 39 days	
Weight throw	22.16 m (72 ft 8 1/4 in)	Brent Fairbanks	February 24, 2018	GLIAC Championships	Allendale, United States	18 years, 283 days	
Heptathlon	6022	Gunnar Nixon	January 28, 2012		Fayetteville, Arkansas, United States	19 years, 15 days	
Heptathlon	60m / Long jump / Shot put / High jump / 60m H / Pole vault / 1000m; 7.10 / 7.53m / 13.97m / 2.15m / 8.21 / 4.50m / 2:40.15						
5000 m walk							
4 × 400 m relay	3:09.44	Bullis School; Cameron Homer; Alexander Lambert; Colin Abrams; Quincy Wilson	March 16, 2025	New Balance Nationals Indoor	Boston, United States	17 years, 67 days	

=== Women ===
Event	Record	Athlete	Date	Meet	Place	Age	Ref.
50 m	6.28	Victoria Jordan	March 11, 2007		Landover, United States	17 years, 13 days	
55 m	6.68 A	Aleisha Latimer	January 19, 1996		Boulder, United States	16 years, 281 days	
60 m	7.07 A	Kaila Jackson	10 March 2023	NCAA Division I Championships	Albuquerque, United States	18 years, 253 days	
200 m	22.34	JaMeesia Ford	9 March 2024	NCAA Division I Championships	Boston, United States	19 years, 43 days	
300 m	35.83	JaMeesia Ford	8 December 2023	Clemson Opener	Clemson, United States	18 years, 316 days	
400 m	50.36	Sydney McLaughlin	March 10, 2018	NCAA Division I Championships	College Station, United States	18 years, 215 days	
600 m	1:23.57	Athing Mu	February 24, 2019	USA Championships	Staten Island, United States	16 years, 261 days	
800 m	1:58.40	Athing Mu	27 February 2021	Southeastern Conference Championships	Fayetteville, United States	18 years, 264 days	
1000 m	2:35.80	Mary Cain	February 8, 2014		Boston, United States	17 years, 281 days	
1500 m
1500 m	4:06.63+	Mary Cain	January 24, 2014		Boston United States	17 years, 266 days	
1500 m	4:04.62	Mary Cain	February 16, 2013	Millrose Games	New York, New York United States	16 years, 289 days	
Mile	4:24.11	Mary Cain	January 24, 2014	Boston Terrier Invitational	Boston, Massachusetts United States	17 years, 266 days	
3000 m	8:58.88	Elise Cranny	March 14, 2015	NCAA Division I Championships	Fayetteville United States	19 years, 310 days	
3000 m	8:54.27 OT	Allie Ostrander	February 12, 2016	UW Husky Classic	Seattle, United States	19 years, 50 days	
3000 m	8:54.18	Katelyn Tuohy	December 4, 2021	BU Sharon Colyear-Danville Season Opener	Boston United States	19 years, 261 days	
5000 m	15:20.57	Sarah Disanza	6 December 2014	Boston University Season Opener	Boston, United States	19 years, 114 days	
5000 m	15:13.26	Jane Hedengren	13 March 2025	Nike Indoor Nationals	New York City, United States	18 years, 171 days	
5000 m	14:44.79	Jane Hedengren	6 December 2025	Sharon Colyear-Danville Season Opener	Boston, United States	19 years, 74 days	
55 m hurdles	7.56	Nicole Hoxie	February 7, 1998		Norman, United States	18 years, 200 days	
60 m hurdles	8.01	Dior Hall	13 March 2015	NCAA Division I Championships	Fayetteville, United States	19 years, 70 days	
60 m hurdles	7.98	Tara Davis	March 9, 2018	NCAA Division I Championships	College Station, United States	18 years, 293 days	
60 m hurdles	7.93	Grace Stark	February 29, 2020	SEC Championships	College Station, United States	18 years, 299 days	
60 m hurdles	7.91	Grace Stark	February 29, 2020	SEC Championships	College Station, United States	18 years, 299 days	
High jump	1.99 m (6 ft 6 1/4 in)	Vashti Cunningham	March 12, 2016	USA Indoor Track and Field Championships	Portland, Oregon, United States	18 years, 54 days	
Pole vault	4.64 m (15 ft 2 1/2 in)	Hana Moll (Note: Amanda Moll by USATF source, a typo)	27 January 2024	UW Invite/Mile City	Seattle, United States	18 years, 361 days	
Long jump	6.74 m (22 ft 1 1/4 in) A	Alyssa Jones	10 March 2023	NCAA Division I Championships	Albuquerque United States	19 years, 32 days	
Triple jump	13.98 m (45 ft 10 1/4 in)	Keturah Orji	January 24, 2015	Rod McCravy Memorial Track & Field Meet	Lexington, United States	18 years, 325 days	
Shot put	18.62 m (61 ft 1 in)	Raven Saunders	March 14, 2015		Eugene, United States	18 years, 303 days	
Pentathlon	4635 pts A	Kendell Williams	15 March 2014	NCAA Championships	Albuquerque United States	18 years, 283 days	
Pentathlon	60m H / High jump / Shot put / Long jump / 800m; 8.21 / 1.88m / 12.05m / 6.32m / 2:17.31						
1500 m walk	6:02.85+	Taylor Ewert	February 9, 2019	Millrose Games	New York City United States	17 years, 80 days	
Mile walk	6:28.21	Taylor Ewert	February 9, 2019	Millrose Games	New York City United States	17 years, 80 days	
3000 m walk	13:24.76	Taylor Ewert	January 18, 2019	Virginia Showcase	Lynchburg, United States	17 years, 58 days	
4 × 400 m relay	3:38.91	Long Beach Polytechnic High School; Dashanta Harris, Jasmine Lee, Shana Woods, Shalonda Solomon	March 14, 2004		New York, New York United States		
