= Camryn Dickson =

American athlete (born 2004)

Personal information
- Nationality: United States
- Born: Camryn Domonique Dickson; 19 June 2004 (age 22)

Sport
- Sport: Athletics
- Event: Sprint

Achievements and titles
- Personal bests: 60m: 7.22 (2024); 100m: 11.04 (2026); 200m: 22.13 (2026); 400m: 56.12 (2022)
Medal record
Women's athletics
Representing United States
Pan American U20 Championships
Gold medal – first place	2023 Mayagüez	4 × 100 m
Bronze medal – third place	2023 Mayagüez	100 m

Camryn Domonique Dickson (born 19 June 2004) is an American sprinter.

== Biography ==
From Texas, Dickson attended Clear Brook High School. In 2022, she was top of her high school rankings in the state for the 100 metres and 200 metres, with personal bests of 11.28 seconds for the 100 m and 23.28 seconds for the 200 m that year.

In August 2023, she competed at the 2023 Pan American U20 Athletics Championships and was part of the American 4 × 100 m relay team that won the gold medal in a new American U20 national record time. She also won the bronze medal in the individual 100 metres race. Dickson qualified for the 200 metres at the 2024 US Olympic Team Trials with a time of 22.66 seconds, reaching the semi-finals.

Competing for Texas A&M University in May 2026, Dickson ran a facility record in the 200 metres of in 22.13 seconds, breaking her own school record, at the NCAA West Regionals in Fayetteville and qualified for the 2026 NCAA Outdoor Championships, where she placed third overall in the 200 metres final. In July, she placed third overall in she final of the 200 metres at the 2026 USA Outdoor Track and Field Championships in New York, running 22.58 seconds behind winner Melissa Jefferson-Wooden and Cambrea Sturgis.
