= List of United States high school athletics championships =

This article lists the notable American high school national championships for the sport of athletics, consisting of cross country running and track and field competitions. Most U.S. high school track and field or cross country competitions are run under the authority of the National Federation of State High School Associations.

== Cross country ==
- Nike Cross Nationals
- Brooks XC Championships Presented By Fleet Feet

== Indoor track and field ==
- Nike Indoor Nationals
- New Balance Nationals Indoor
- Adidas Track Nationals

== Outdoor track and field ==
- Nike Outdoor Nationals
- New Balance Nationals Outdoor
- Adidas Track Nationals
- Brooks PR Invitational
