= 1600 meters =

Middle-distance running event

Athletics 1600 meters

World records
- Men: (United Kingdom) Josh Kerr 3:41.4 (2026)
- Women: (Kenya) Faith Kipyegon 4:06.20c (2023)

1600 meters is a middle distance track and field running event that is slightly shorter than the more common mile run, and 100 meters longer than the much more frequent 1500 m run. The 1600-meter event puts some of the best high school runners to the ultimate test, measuring their physical and mental capabilities. With more high school runners doing this event, their VO2 max and overall mood benefit. The 1600-meter races help runners have a lower resting heart rate, help build muscle, and benefit their body composition over a short period of time. In World Athletics, events like the 1500 m and 3000 m are ran in a World Championship setting where in high school, they run the 1600 m and 3200 m, both just short of a full mile and 2 miles.

It is a standardized event in track meets conducted by the NFHS in American high school competition, often being colloquially referred to as "the mile" or "the metric mile".

When the organization went through metrication, finalized with their 1980 rule book, the 4 lap around a 440 yard, imperial-measured mile run, was replaced by the closest metric distance, 4 laps around a 400 meter track, or 8 laps around an indoor 200 meter track. That decision is not without controversy. The race is 9.344 meters shorter, similarly to the 3200 meter run being 18.688 meters short of 2 miles. Other organizations have followed the lead of World Athletics and use the 1500 meters as the closest equivalent.

While World Athletics does not recognize an official world record or world best in the 1600 meters, the mile run can be used as an approximation.

== American high school records (Note: References List of United States high school national records in track and field) ==
The current male high school record holder in the 1600 m is Drew Griffith, who ran 3:57.08 against other high schoolers at the PIAA Class 3A Championships. Drew Griffith pushed himself to his limits against the best high school 1600-meter runners. Even Drew Griffiths, now a teammate in college, Ryan Pajak claimed the silver medal in this competitive 1600 m race. Opening up in a 58.04, Drew never lost the lead, going through the 800 m in 1:58.92. Eventually closing out his historic run with his last two laps in a time of 60.75 seconds and 57.98 seconds. Running through the finish line knowing he just ran a time that would go down in the history books.

Griffith took the record from Alan Webb, who ran for South Lakes High School in Reston, Virginia. Webb ran 3:59.51 at the Arcadia Invitational against high school athletes on April 14, 2001. Six weeks later, Webb ran a mile against seasoned international runners at the Prefontaine Classic, including world record holder Hicham El Guerrouj of Morocco and the 2000 Summer Olympics' 1500 metres bronze medalist Bernard Lagat. Webb was timed in 3:51.83 for 1600 m (en route to the high school mile record in 3:53.43). Webb was technically still in high school at the time, but the NFHS only recognizes the race against other high school competitors.

Several other high schoolers have run faster than Griffith's 3:57.08 1600 m, including Gary Martin (3:57.98 mile, 3:56.60 1600 m) in 2022 and Jim Ryun (3:58.3 mile, 3:56.92 1600 m) in 1965.

=== All-time outdoor top high school boys' times (Note: In high-school only 1600 m races, and not en-route to the mile. May not be perfectly up to date.) ===
Sub-4:05 high school boys' 1600 m performers
Time	Athlete	State	High School	Date	Meet	Location	Ref.
3:57.08	Drew Griffith	Pennsylvania	Butler	24 May 2024	PIAA Championships	Shippensburg	
3:59.51	Alan Webb	Virginia	Reston South Lakes	2001	Arcadia Invitational	Arcadia	
3:59.54	Michael Slagowski	Idaho	Meridian	2016			
4:00.28	Grant Fisher	Michigan	Grand Blanc	2015			
4:00.29	German Fernandez	California	Riverbank	2008			
4:02.30	Sam Worley	Texas	Comal Canyon	2017			
4:02.49	Reed Brown	Texas	Southlake Carroll	2017			
4:02.62	Ryan Hall	California	Big Bear	2001			
4:03.00	Austin Mudd	Indiana	Greenwood Center Grove	2011			
4:03.22	Paul Vandergrift	Pennsylvania	Cnshhckn. Archbshp. Kndy.	1987			
4:03.59	John Quade	Washington	Woodinville	1985			
4:03.68	Owen Powell	Washington	Mercer Island	29 May 2025	WA State Championships	Tacoma	
4:03.80	John Robinson	Texas	Pasadena Dobie	1980			
4:03:27	Steve Magness	Texas	Klein Oak	2003			
4:04.00	Michael Stember	California	Carmichael Jesuit	1995			
4:04.09	Matthew Centrowitz, Jr.	Maryland	Annapolis Broadneck	2007			
4.04.49	Luke Pash	New Jersey	Ridgewood	12 June 2024	Meet of Champions	Pennsauken	
4:04.70	Gabe Fendel	Indiana	Hamilton Southeastern	2017			
4:04.91	Tyler Sainsbury	Idaho	Rocky Mountain	2023	Pasco Invitational	Pasco	
4:04.95	A.J. Acosta	California	Oceanside El Camino	2006			
4:04.97	Gabe Jennings	Wisconsin	Madison East	1997			

The female record is less disputed, as Alexa Efraimson of Camas High School in Camas, Washington ran her 4:33.29 at the Washington State 4A Championships, exclusively against other high school girls, in 2014. In 2022, Sadie Engelhardt tied Efraimson's record.

However, some high school girls have run faster than Efraimson, though this is not recognized by the NFHS, who only recognizes times in a 1600 m race against other high schoolers.

First, on April 6, 2024, Engelhardt broke Efraimson's record by running 4:32.48, though this has not yet been ratified by the NFHS.

Furthermore, Katelyn Tuohy ran a 4:32.28 1600 m en route to her 2018 outdoor high school mile record of 4:33.87. Tuohy's record has since been broken three times, which have not yet been ratified by the NFHS.

First, on April 19, 2024, Sadie Engelhardt ran a 4:31.72 mile at the Mt. SAC Relays, which converts to a 4:30.14 1600 m.

Next, on May 30, 2024, at the HOKA Festival of Miles, Allie Zealand ran a 4:30.38 mile which converts to a 4:28.81 1600 m against other high schoolers. Lastly, in the race after Zealand, against professionals, Engelhardt ran a 4:28.26 mile, which converts to a 4:26.70 1600 m.

Moving forward, Mary Cain's 2013 indoor high school mile record of 4:28.25 converts to a 4:26.69 1600 m, though the NFHS does not recognize this as the high school girls' 1600 m record.

Finally, in 2022, Addy Wiley ran a 4:26.16 1600 m, which has not yet been ratified by NFHS.

=== All-time outdoor top 20 high school girls' times ===
Top high school girls' 1600 m performers
Time	Athlete	State	Date & Location
4:32.48	Sadie Engelhardt	California	(Ventura) at Arcadia, CA, 4-6, 2024
4:33.29	Alexa Efraimson	Washington	(Camas) at Tacoma, WA, 5-29, 2014
4:33.29	Sadie Engelhardt	California	(Ventura) at Arcadia, CA, 4-10, 2022
4:33.82	Christine Babcock	California	(Irvine Woodbridge) at Norwalk, CA, 2008
4:36.57	Christine Babcock	California	(Irvine Woodbridge), 2008
4:37.07	Taryn Parks	Pennsylvania	(Greencastle), 2019
4:37.45	Marlee Starliper	Pennsylvania	(Dillsburg Northern York), 2019
4:38.15	Alex Kosinski	California	(El Dorado Hills Oak Ridge), 2007
4:38.85	Christine Babcock	California	(Irvine Woodbridge), 2007
4:39.13	Jordan Hasay	California	(San Luis Obispo Mission Prep), 2007
4:39.23	Hannah Meier	Michigan	(Grosse Pointe South), 2013
4:39.33	Amanda Gehrich	California	(Tesoro), 2015
4:39.4	Laura Matson	Michigan	(Bloomfield Hills-Andover), 1985
4:39.88	Marissa Williams	California	(Palisades), 2015
4:39.92	Polly Anne Plumer	California	(Irvine University), 1982
4:40.88	Cami Chapus	California	(Harvard-Westlake), 2011
4:41.08	Kim Gallagher	Pennsylvania	(Fort Washington Upper Dublin), 1981
4:41.29	Christine Babcock	California	(Irvine Woodbridge), 2006
4:41.29	Brynn Brown	Texas	(Denton Guyer), 2021
4:42.10	Annie St. Geme	California	(Newport. Beach Corona del Mar), 2006

== Equivalent world bests ==
=== Outdoor ===
In his 3:42.66 mile world record, Josh Kerr split 3:41.4 for 1600 meters.

When converted down to 1600 m, Faith Kipyegon ran an equivalent of a 4:06.20 1600 m in her world record mile of 4:07.64 at the Herculis meeting in Monaco on July 21, 2023.

=== Indoor ===
When converted down to 1600 m, Jakob Ingebrigtsen ran an equivalent of a 3:43.83 1600 m in his 2025 world record mile of 3:45.14 set at the Meeting Hatus De France Pas De Calais Trophee at the World Tour in Levin, France.

Likewise, when converted down to 1600 m, Genzebe Dibaba ran an equivalent of a 4:11.84 1600 m in her world record mile of 4:13.31 set at the Globen Galan Meeting in Stockholm, Sweden on February 17, 2016.

== Relays ==
1600 meters is also the distance of the final leg of a distance medley relay, because it is an even 4 laps, where at 3.75 laps, the 1500 would require the start line or finish line to be moved. Whether or not you've heard of the 4 × 100 meter relay or the 4 × 400 meter relay, the DMR is unique because the 1600 meter is a distance within the relay among different distances. The 1600-meter is the longest part of the DMR, which in some ways makes it the most challenging. The DMR gives distance runners who don't have enough speed for the 4 × 400-meter relay or anything shorter a versatile relay in which they can still showcase their talents. With the range being from 400 meters to 1600 meters, these distances give the event so much excitement in a track meet. Another relay that is ran with consideration of the 1600 m is the 4 × mile relay. This relay is not ran at many meets but one is Penn Relays held at the University of Pennsylvania in Philadelphia, PA.

== See also ==
- 1500 metres
- Mile run
- 3200 meters
