= Katie Rainsberger =

American long-distance runner

Personal information
- Nationality: American
- Born: August 18, 1998 (age 27)
- Height: 5 ft 9 in (1.75 m)

Sport
- Sport: Track and field, cross country
- Event(s): 1500 m, 3000 m, 5000 m, cross country
- Team: University of Washington
- Coached by: Lisa Rainsberger, Maurica and Andy Powell

Katie Rainsberger (born August 18, 1998) is an American long distance runner from Colorado. Her mother is former distance star Lisa Larsen (Weidenbach) Rainsberger. She ran track and cross country for the University of Oregon and University of Washington. In high school, she won the Nike Cross Nationals as well as ten state titles in cross country and the 800, 1600, and 3200 meters. She finished third in the distance medley relay and 3,000 m events at the 2017 NCAA Division I Indoor Track and Field Championships. She placed third in the steeplechase at the 2021 NCAA Division I Outdoor Track and Field Championships. Rainsberger is also a former collegiate record holder in the distance medley relay.

== Early life ==
Katie played soccer for her first two years in high school, and in 2012, was the MVP of the state club soccer tournament, before focusing entirely on track, where her mother coached her. She was a 4.5 GPA student at the Air Academy High School in Colorado Springs. Her brother, Ian, is three years younger than she. The tall speedster won 10 state titles in cross country and track and field in 2015–16, swept the 800, 1,600 and 3,200 meters at the 2016 Colorado state meet for the second straight season and was undefeated at distance as a senior. She recorded the fifth fastest ever prep mile time, 4:40.92, to earn 2015 Track and Field News All-America honors, then clocked the 6th fastest all-time high school time in the 1,500 meters at the 2016 Portland Track Festival, where she ran 4:12.62. She led the Nike Nationals cross-country in 16:56.8, was the national Gatorade U.S. Cross Country Runner of the Year, and set the U.S. high school females 5k cross country record at 16:23.5, until it was broken by Katelyn Tuohy in 2018. While in high school she set her personal outdoor bests for the mile of 4:40.92 on June 13, 2015, and nine months later at The Armory indoors, in 4:36.61, both in New York, NY. In 2015 she had the U.S. yearly high school best for 800 Meters, 2:08.87. In 2016, she duplicated that feat with a 1,600 Meters in 4:44.31 and 3,200 Meters in 10:23.24.

Shortly after graduating from high school, she ran 3000 Meters in 9:00.62 at Bydgoszcz, Poland on July 20, 2016.

== Career ==
Katie ran for the University of Oregon for her Freshman and Sophomore years. In 2016, she placed fourth at the 2016 NCAA Division I cross country championships. She finished seventh in the 3,000 m at the 2016 IAAF World U20 Championships.

In 2017, she placed third in the distance medley relay and 3,000 m at the 2017 NCAA Division I Indoor Track and Field Championships and fourth in the 1,500 m at the 2017 NCAA Division I Outdoor Track and Field Championships. Rainsberger also finished tenth in the 1,500 m at the 2017 USA Outdoor Track and Field Championships. That season, she also broke the distance medley relay collegiate record with her teammates. In her 2018 outdoor season, she suffered a partially-torn achilles tendon, though she continued to compete through the season.

With other Oregon distance runners, she then transferred to the University of Washington in the fall of 2018 in order to be with coaches, Andy and Maurica Powell. Rainsberger also cited RED-S, injury, and body fat monitoring by coaches at Oregon as a reason for preferring the Washington program.

Rainsberger finished eighth in the mile at the 2021 NCAA Division I Indoor Track and Field Championships. She placed third in the steeplechase at the 2021 NCAA Division I Outdoor Track and Field Championships and tenth at the 2020 United States Olympic trials (track and field).

Post-college, Rainsberger joined Team Boss in Boulder, Colorado. She won silver in the steeplechase at the 2022 NACAC Championships. That season, she also ran her personal best time of 9:29.77.
