= Nike Cross Nationals =

Invitational cross country meet in the United States

- Genre: Cross country running
- Country: United States
- Inaugurated: 2004; 22 years ago
- Sponsor: Nike, Inc.

Nike Cross Nationals (NXN) (formerly known as Nike Team Nationals) is an invitational cross country meet that serves as the unofficial team national championship of United States high school cross country. Sponsored by Nike, It was designed to heighten competition between high school cross country teams nationwide. NXN was formerly a part of the Nike Nationals Series, which included national events for indoor and outdoor track.

== History ==
NTN was started in 2004 along with the other two meets in the Nike Nationals Series in order to promote the national circuit for high school competitive running. Because the series is not sanctioned by NFHS, the high school sports governing body, the meet is conducted under normal USATF Open competition rules. High school teams cannot represent their high school name directly, but instead represent clubs that consist of members of the high school team. The inaugural race in 2004 consisted of 21 boys' teams and 20 girls' teams and was seen by an estimated 4,000 spectators. Kinetic XC Club of Saratoga High School, which had been ranked in polls as the number one girls' team in the country for the past decade, dominated the girls' race with a score of 51. Kroy XC Club of York High School won the boys' race with 92 points. The race featured a special award called the "Golden Anchor," given to the top four number five runners in each race.

The 2005 race saw the introduction of an eighth man race, which was held before the main event races, and in 2006 combined with the open race.

An Open Race was new to the 2006 event, with 30 top boys and girls from around the country given the chance to compete as a team on the national level; however, they did not qualify and therefore Nike did not provide their expenses or clothing. Also new to 2006 was a revision of the course. On December 2, 2006, a Kenyan boys' team and a Kenyan girls' team were also flown in to partake in the open events; the teams dominated the North American course and showed spectators a whole new view of racing.

On April 25, 2008, Nike announced that it will change their name from NTN to NXN (Nike Cross Nationals). Along with the two teams from each region that make it to NXN, Nike will also take the next five individuals from each region and they will also be able to compete in the same race, just without a team.

This new format has created many conflicts with the Foot Locker Cross Country Championships. The FLCCC has been one of the nation's most prestigious high school cross country races since its inception in 1979 as the Kinney Cross Country Championships. With the different regions for FLCCC and NXN (changed to Nike Cross Nationals in 2008 to recognize individual achievement) and both races/qualifying races near or on the same dates as the other, runners are faced with a tough decision to make, ultimately depriving either race of some national elite runners, thereby also diluting a true "national champion" individual runner.

== The competition ==
In the past, Nike has selected 20 teams from around the nation to compete in the NTN meet, which typically was held the first weekend in December (Nike Team Nationals is preceded by Nike Pre-Nationals in late September). These selections were based on regional and national rankings updated weekly during the fall cross country season. Teams were selected on "Selection Sundays", typically following the finish of state meets. There were eight regions across the country: Northeast, Southeast, South, Midwest, Heartland, Southwest, Northwest, and California. In addition, four at-large teams were selected, which could be from any region. Starting with the fourth NTN meet, however, the entry procedures changed; New York became its own region due to the girls' teams over the years dominating the meet (see below), raising the number of selected teams to 22. Also, regional meets held in each of the regions (except for California; will use end-of-season performances) now guarantee the top two finishing teams invites, most likely due to complaints about how a team should have gone, but didn't. New York was originally going to use the top 2 teams in the Federation Meet, but it was changed to also have a regional meet. This upset some fans, and cause some teams to skip the Federations meet to prepare for the NTN regional. There will still be four at-large teams chosen by the NTN committee, in addition to the top two teams from each region.

In the beginning, the event was held in the second weekend of December in Portland, Oregon, at the Portland Meadows thoroughbred racing track. The race featured a man-made five-kilometer course that is completed with three loops, following European cross country tradition. The venue had an enclosed 3,000-seat grandstand, allowing spectators to see the whole race, unlike normal cross country meets. The infield of the track, where the course was set up, was also open to spectators who wished to get a more close-up view of the race.

In 2014, the course location was changed from the Portland Meadows track to the Glendoveer Golf Course. The course goes across eight greens at Glendoveer and has a much faster feel than the now demolished Portland Meadows horse track. The course is far less muddy and has a different route than the original course and has been well received.

NXN has a reputation for being extremely muddy. The course is located not only in the rainy Pacific Northwest but also in a low area and a drainage basin. It is a common sight to see runners soaked in mud at the end of NXN races.

Since NXN is held on the same weekend as the Foot Locker Cross Country West Regional Championship, in 2005 and 2006, the top two runners at NXN who would have otherwise competed in the west region earned automatic bids to the Foot Locker National Cross Country Championship.

== Boys' individual champions ==
Again, Nike Cross Nationals was Nike Team Nationals (NTN) in 2004, 2005, 2006, and 2007. Since 2008 it has been named Nike Cross Nationals (NXN).

On the far left, click the year for complete results provided by Nike. On the far right, click for complete coverage provided by DyeStat or MileSplit of that year's NTN/NXN Championship.

Year	Individual Champion	State	Region	Time	Coverage	Video
2004	Sean McNamara	Illinois	Midwest	15:43	Milesplit	
2005	Kenny Klotz	Oregon	Northwest	16:25	Milesplit	Video
2006	Steve Murdock	New York	Northeast*	16:26	DyeStat	Video
2007	Chris Derrick	Illinois	Midwest	15:39	DyeStat	Video
2008	Reed Connor	Texas	South	15:13	DyeStat	Video
2009	Craig Lutz	Texas	South	15:09	DyeStat	Video
2010	Lukas Verzbicas	Illinois	Midwest	15:59	DyeStat	Video
2011	Futsum Zienasellassie	Indiana	Midwest	15:03	DyeStat	Video
2012	Sam Wharton	Ohio	Midwest	17:08	MileSplit	Video
2013	Taylor Wilmot	Washington	Northwest	15:00	MileSplit	Video
2014	Tanner Anderson	Washington	Northwest	15:10	MileSplit	Video on YouTube
2015	Casey Clinger	Utah	Southwest	15:03	MileSplit	Video on YouTube
2016	Casey Clinger	Utah	Southwest	15:28	MileSplit	Video on YouTube
2017	Aidan Troutner	Utah	Southwest	15:03	MileSplit	Video on YouTube
2018	Liam Anderson	California	California	14:57	MileSplit	Video on YouTube
2019	Nico Young	California	California	14:52		Video on YouTube
2022	Aaron Sahlman	California	California	14:44		Video on YouTube
2023	JoJo Jourdon	Utah	Southwest	15:16		
2024	Charlie Vause	New Mexico	Southwest	15:28		
2025	Jackson Spencer	Utah	Southwest	15:01.1		

- New York was part of the Northeast Region until the selection process was replaced by the regional meets in 2007

== Girls' individual champions ==
Again, results are linked by year—coverage at the far right.

Year	Individual Champion	State	Region	Time	Coverage	Video
2004	Ramsay Kavan	South Dakota	Heartland	18:05	DyeStat	
2005	Betsy Bies	South Dakota	Heartland	19:23	DyeStat	Video
2006	Ashley Higginson	New Jersey	Northeast	19:18	DyeStat	Video
2007	Madeline Morgan	Alabama	Southeast	18:54	DyeStat	Video
2008	Chelsey Sveinsson	Texas	South	17:26	DyeStat	Video
2009	Katie Flood	Iowa	Heartland	17:47	DyeStat	Video
2010	Rachel Johnson	Texas	South	18:18	DyeStat	Video
2011	Sarah Baxter	California	California	17:38	DyeStat	Video
2012	Sarah Baxter	California	California	19:17	MileSplit	Video
2013	Alexa Efraimson	Washington	Northwest	16:50	MileSplit	Video
2014	Allie Ostrander	Alaska	Northwest	17:19	MileSplit	Video on YouTube
2015	Katie Rainsberger	Colorado	Southwest	16:56	MileSplit	Video on YouTube
2016	Brie Oakley	Colorado	Southwest	17:10	MileSplit	Video on YouTube
2017	Katelyn Tuohy	New York	New York	16:44	MileSplit	Video
2018	Katelyn Tuohy	New York	New York	16:37	MileSplit	
2019	Katelyn Tuohy	New York	New York	17:18		Video on YouTube
2022	Irene Riggs	West Virginia	Southeast	16:40		
2023	Addy Ritzenhein	Colorado	Southwest	17:10		
2024	Jane Hedengren	Utah	Southwest	16:32.7		
2025	Natasza Dudek	Michigan	Midwest	16:50.1		

== Team Standings ==
Girls Team Standings
Season	Champion	State	Score	Runner-up	State	Score	Third place	State	Score
2004	Saratoga Springs	NY	51	Smoky Hill	CO	125	Yankton	SD	154
2005	Hilton	NY	81	Saratoga Springs	NY	112	Southlake Carroll	TX	123
2006	Fayetteville-Manlius	NY	128	Hilton	NY	178	Southlake Carroll	TX	187
2007	Fayetteville-Manlius	NY	83	Saugus	CA	171	Saratoga Springs	NY	194
2008	Fayetteville-Manlius	NY	66	Saugus	CA	135	Tatnall	DE	182
2009	Fayetteville-Manlius	NY	74	Saratoga Springs	NY	147	Fort Collins	CO	161
2010	Fayetteville-Manlius	NY	27	Saratoga Springs	NY	104	Saugus	CA	117
2011	Fayetteville-Manlius	NY	60	Saratoga Springs	NY	84	Tatnall	DE	182
2012	Fayetteville-Manlius	NY	54	Southlake Carroll	TX	198	Carmel	IN	209
2013	Wayzata	MN	108	Fayetteville-Manlius	NY	120	Davis	UT	157
2014	Fayetteville-Manlius	NY	70	Great Oak	CA	149	Carmel	IN	173
2015	Fayetteville-Manlius	NY	55	Davis	CA	144	Great Oak	CA	171
2016	Fayetteville-Manlius	NY	41	Davis	CA	181	Great Oak	CA	185
2017	Fayetteville-Manlius	NY	89	Naperville North	IL	94	Battle Mountain	CO	162
2018	Summit	OR	120	Naperville North	IL	186	Wayzata	MN	207
2019	Saratoga Springs	NY	78	Summit	OR	160	Niwot	CO	171
2020	MEET NOT HELD DUE TO COVID-19 PANDEMIC								
2021	MEET NOT HELD DUE TO COVID-19 PANDEMIC								
2022	Saratoga Springs	NY	81	Niwot	CO	109	Buchanan	CA	116
2023	Air Academy	CO	61	Niwot	CO	72	Mountain Vista	CO	163
2024	Mountain Vista	CO	75	Lone Peak	UT	107	Buchanan	CA	123
2025	Wayzata	MN	142	Niwot	CO	147	Union Catholic	NJ	174

Boys Team Standings
Season	Champion	State	Score	Runner-up	State	Score	Third place	State	Score
2004	York	IL	91	Fayetteville-Manlius	NY	127	Mead	WA	146
2005	Saratoga Springs	NY	111	York	IL	134	Fayetteville-Manlius	NY	134
2006	Coatesville	PA	126	Royal	CA	148	Ferris	WA	162
2007	Neuqua Valley	IL	125	Los Alamos	NM	127	Albuquerque	NM	134
2008	North Central	WA	134	York	IL	151	Naperville North	IL	195
2009	Boerne	TX	195	Ferris	WA	201	The Woodlands	TX	207
2010	Arcadia	CA	92	Fayetteville-Manlius	NY	135	Columbus North	IN	165
2011	Christian Brothers	NJ	91	Southlake Carroll	TX	95	Davis	UT	157
2012	Arcadia	CA	108	American Fork	UT	122	North Central	WA	146
2013	Gig Harbor	WA	111	Christian Brothers	NJ	139	Brentwood	TN	174
2014	Fayetteville-Manlius	NY	111	Wayzata	MN	159	North Central	WA	178
2015	Great Oak	CA	114	American Fork	UT	163	Dana Point	CA	181
2016	Bozeman	MT	105	American Fork	UT	141	Brentwood	TN	163
2017	Loudoun Valley	VA	89	Fayetteville-Manlius	NY	159	Mountain Vista	CO	163
2018	Loudoun Valley	VA	77	Great Oak	CA	114	Dakota Ridge	CO	115
2019	Newbury Park	CA	128	Great Oak	CA	132	Corner Canyon	UT	142
2020	MEET NOT HELD DUE TO COVID-19 PANDEMIC								
2021	MEET NOT HELD DUE TO COVID-19 PANDEMIC								
2022	Newbury Park	CA	66	Jesuit	OR	152	Herriman	UT	155
2023	Herriman	UT	83	American Fork	UT	100	Southlake Carroll	TX	138
2024	Niwot	CO	70	American Fork	UT	96	Herriman	UT	106
2025	Niwot	CO	61	Herriman	UT	97	Christian Brothers	NJ	110

== Summaries ==
=== Nike Team Nationals (NTN) ===
==== 2004 ====
The first-ever Nike Team Nationals were held on December 4, 2004, at Portland Meadows. The inaugural NTN Championships were hailed as the definitive championship of team cross country, as no prep cross country meet prior to this date had brought together the best teams in the nation, and therefore teams such as the York High School (Illinois) boys and Saratoga High School (New York) girls had dominated the polls for the vast majority of the preceding fifteen years. York and Saratoga were tagged as the favorites.

The meet lived up to its hype. The favorites delivered as expected. Sean McNamara of York won the inaugural boys' individual title in 15:44, and Ramsay Kavan of South Dakota took the inaugural girls' individual title with an 18:05 clocking.

York High School (Elmhurst, Illinois), having won twenty-four IHSA state championships and laid claim to numerous national titles in the preceding decades, cemented their place as one of the greatest high school programs in history with their national title, surpassing runner-up Fayetteville–Manlius High School (New York) 92–127. York's 92 points is tied for the second-lowest boys' score in Nike Cross Nationals history.

BOYS' TEAM STANDINGS
Place	Club	School	Location	Score
1	Kroy XC	York Community High School	Elmhurst, Illinois	92
2	Stotan XC	Fayetteville–Manlius High School	Manlius, New York	127
3	Tyson's Army	Mead High School	Spokane, Washington	146

On the girls' side, Saratoga High School (New York) completely demolished the field. Saratoga had four individuals qualify for the FootLocker Nationals out of one regional, an unprecedented feat in cross-country history. Saratoga easily outdistanced runner-up Smoky Hills High School (Aurora, Colorado) 51–125. The 2004 Saratoga team has been billed as the "Greatest Team Ever", and their 51 points would stand until the 2010 Championships.

GIRLS' TEAM STANDINGS
Place	Team	School	Location	Score
1	Kinetic RC	Saratoga Springs High School	Saratoga Springs, New York	51
2	Sisu XC	Smoky Hill High School	Aurora, Colorado	125
3	3-D Running	Yankton High School	Yankton, South Dakota	154

==== 2005 ====
The second edition of the Nike Team Nationals championships, held on December 3, 2005, again at Portland Meadows, was an extremely muddy affair: The all-time slowest girls' individual championship time was set, and the third-slowest boys' individual championship time was set this year.

In the boys' race, following on the heels of the "Greatest Team Ever" Saratoga girls the previous year, the Saratoga boys claimed a national championship of their own, taking the victory by 23 points over defending champion York, 111–134. Kenny Klots (Oregon) ran to a muddy 16:25 win.

BOYS' TEAM STANDINGS
Place	Club	School	Location	Score
1	Saratoga XC Club	Saratoga Springs High School	Saratoga Springs, New York	111
2*	Elmhurst XC Club	York Community High School	Elmhurst, Illinois	134
3*	Manlius XC Club	Fayetteville–Manlius High School	Manlius, New York	134

- Elmhurst XC Club gets second place on sixth-runner tie-breaker

On the girls' side, New York continued its national dominance: Hilton High School claimed the national crown from Saratoga, who finished second, 27 points behind: 85–112. South Dakota continued its hold on the girls' individual championship, with Betsy Bies winning in a mud-filled 19:23 victory.

GIRLS' TEAM STANDINGS
Place	Club	School	Location	Score
1	Hilton XC Club	Hilton High School	Hilton, New York	85
2	Saratoga Streaks	Saratoga Springs High School	Saratoga Springs, New York	112
3	Carroll XC Club	Carroll Senior High School	Southlake, Texas	123

==== 2006 ====
The third annual Nike Team Nationals championship, held again at Portland Meadows on December 2, 2006, saw the first team not from New York or Illinois to win either a boys' or girls' championship.

Coatesville High School (Pennsylvania) won the boys' team title a 22-point spread, 126–148 over Royal High School (California). Individually, Steve Murdock (New York) won the individual title in the slowest boys' time up to this point with a 16:27 finish. This record would be broken by Sam Wharton of Ohio in the 2012 championships. 2004 National Champion and 2005 National runner-up York finished 10th after being one of the favorites to win a second national championship.

BOYS' TEAM STANDINGS
Place	Club	School	Location	Score
1	Bridgetown XC Club	Coatesville High School	Coatesville, Pennsylvania	126
2	Simi West XC Club	Royal High School	Simi Valley, California	148
3	Spokane XC Club	Ferris High School	Spokane, Washington	162

On the girls' side, Ashley Higginson from New Jersey won in 19:18, five seconds faster than the previous year's champion. In the team race, however, New York continued its stranglehold on the girls' Nike Team National title. After Saratoga and Hilton won the previous two years, Fayetteville–Manlius became the third different girls' team from New York to win the national title.

Fayetteville–Manlius had been out of the running until they won the New York state championships, and then followed that up with the New York Federations championships. They capped their season with a fifty-point national title victory over the defending champions, Hilton, 128–178.

GIRLS' TEAM STANDINGS
Place	Club	School	Location	Score
1	Manlius XC Club	Fayetteville–Manlius High School	Manlius, New York	128
2	Hilton XC Club	Hilton High School	Hilton, New York	178
3	Carroll XC Club	Carroll Senior High School	Southlake, Texas	187

==== 2007 ====
Illinois and New York continued their Nike Team Nationals dominance in the fourth edition of the event at Portland Meadows on December 1, 2007.

For 2007, Nike began running Regional championships in nine regions: Heartland, Midwest, Northwest, Northeast, New York, South, Southwest, Southeast. California had its own 'regionals' by selection.

In the boys' race, favored Neuqua Valley High School (Naperville, Illinois) won in what is still the closest margin in team scoring in NXN history over Los Alamos High School (Los Alamos, New Mexico), 125–127. Neuqua Valley's championship scoring started with the national champion, Chris Derrick, who had won the Illinois state meet and the NTN Midwest Regional Championship, and added a then-record-setting NTN time to his resume with a 15:39 victory.

BOYS' TEAM STANDINGS
Place	Club	School	Location	Score
1	Naperville XC Club	Neuqua Valley High School	Naperville, Illinois	125
2	Los Alamos XC Club	Los Alamos High School	Los Alamos, New Mexico	127
3	Albuquerque XC Club	Albuquerque Academy	Albuquerque, New Mexico	134

On the opposite side in the girls' race, the word "close" was nowhere to be found in the team scoring, as defending national champion Fayetteville–Manlius (New York) romped to an 88-point win over runner-up Saugus High School (California), 83–171, which was the in Nike Team/Cross Nationals history until the 2012 championships. With the victory, Fayetteville–Manlius became the first school to win consecutive national titles as well as the first school to win multiple national titles for one gender. Individually, Madeline Morgan of Alabama won the girls' championship in 18:54.

GIRLS' TEAM STANDINGS
Place	Club	School	Location	Score
1	Manlius XC Club	Fayetteville–Manlius High School	Manlius, New York	83
2	Newhall XC Club	Saugus High School	Santa Clarita, California	171
3	Kinetic RC	Saratoga Springs High School	Saratoga, New York	194

=== Nike Cross Nationals (NXN) ===
==== 2008 ====
Speed was the word in the fifth running of the Nike Team Nationals on December 6, 2008. However, the event wasn't Nike Team Nationals anymore: Nike had changed the middle word to Nike Cross Nationals instead. Therefore, Nike Team Nationals, or NTN, instead became Nike Cross Nationals, or NXN.

Illinois and New York continued adding to their impressive performances at NXN in the 2008 edition in both the boys' and girls' races.

In the boys' team race, North Central High School (Spokane, Washington) won the national title 134–151 over York (Illinois). With their runner-up finish, York became the only boys' team in NXN history to either win the championship or finish runner-up more than two times. Additionally, York became the only team, either boys or girls, to qualify for NXN in each of the first five years of its existence. Adding to the impressive Illinois resume on the boys' side, that year's Class 3A state champion Naperville North (Naperville, Illinois) finished third. Naperville North had beaten York at state by one point.

BOYS' TEAM STANDINGS
Place	Club	School	Location	Score
1	North Spokane XC Club	North Central High School	Spokane, Washington	134
2	Elmhurst XC Club	York Community High School	Elmhurst, Illinois	151
3	Naperville XC Club	Naperville North High School	Naperville, Illinois	195

In the girls' team race, New York continued its monopoly on the girls' team title, with Fayetteville–Manlius continuing to build their dynasty, becoming the first team to win three consecutive national titles, beating runner-up Saugus (California) for the second year in a row, this time by a 69-point spread.

GIRLS' TEAM STANDINGS
Place	Club	School	Location	Score
1	Manlius XC Club	Fayetteville–Manlius High School	Manlius, New York	66
2	Santa Clarita XC Club	Saugus High School	Santa Clarita, California	135
3	Wilmington XC Club	Tatnall School	Wilmington, Delaware	182

In the individual championships, Texas swept the titles with Reed Connor winning on the boys' side in 15:14, and Chelsey Sveinsson taking the girls' victory in 17:27—both times were NXN records up this point.

==== 2009 ====
The sixth running of the Nike Cross Nationals at Portland Meadows took place on December 5, 2009.

In the boys' race, the third different national champion in three season came from a third different state. Boerne Samuel V. Champion High School (Texas) won the national title with 195 points, the highest score for a national champion in history, either boys or girls. Ferris High School (Spokane, Washington) finished six points behind Boerne. Craig Lutz completed the Texas sweep with an NXN record 15:09 clocking.

BOYS' TEAM STANDINGS
Place	Club	School	Location	Score
1	Boerne XC Club	Boerne Samuel V. Champion High School	Boerne, Texas	195
2	South Spokane XC Club	Ferris High School	Spokane, Washington	201
3	The Woodlands XC Club	The Woodlands High School	The Woodlands, Texas	207

On the girls' side, consistency was the name of the game. For the third time in NXN history, New York teams went 1–2 as Saratoga High School reclaimed runner-up status to Fayetteville–Manlius from fourth-place Saugus (California). The Fayetteville–Manlius dynasty continued with a 74-point team score to top Saratoga's 146 for their fourth consecutive national title as Katie Flood (Iowa) took the girls' individual crown in a time of 17:47.

GIRLS' TEAM STANDINGS
Place	Club	School	Location	Score
1	Manlius XC Club	Fayetteville–Manlius High School	Manlius, New York	74
2	Kinetic XC Club	Saratoga Springs High School	Saratoga Springs, New York	147
3	Fort Collins XC Club	Fort Collins High School	Fort Collins, Colorado	161

==== 2010 ====
The seventh annual Nike Cross Nationals took place, as usual, at Portland Meadows on December 4, 2010.

In the boys' individual race, Illinois state champion, NXN-Midwest Regional Champion, and FootLocker Midwest Regional Champion Lukas Verzbicas came to Portland Meadows looking for a Nike Cross Nationals Championship as the first part of a NXN/Footlocker sweep. Verzbicas delivered with a 15:59 victory in the mud.

In the team championship, California finally claimed a team national championship for the first time ever, with the Arcadia boys winning with 92 points to surprise runner-up Fayetteville–Manlius (New York)'s 135 points. Arcadia tied the inaugural 2004 national champions, York, for the lowest scoring team in NXN history.

BOYS' TEAM STANDINGS
Place	Club	School	Location	Score
1	Arcadia XC Club	Arcadia High School	Arcadia, California	92
2	Manlius XC Club	Fayetteville–Manlius High School	Manlius, New York	135
3	Columbus XC Club	Columbus North High School	Columbus, Indiana	165

Individually for the girls, the state of Texas won their fourth individual championship in three years, with Rachel Johnson taking the girls' championship in a muddy 18:19 victory.

After Johnson, however, it was entirely the Fayetteville–Manlius dynasty. After Boerne (Texas) set the NXN record for the highest scoring champion, either boys or girls (with 195 points) the previous year, Fayetteville–Manlius set the NXN record for the lowest score, either boys or girls en route to their fifth consecutive national championship with a minuscule 27 points. Manlius girls scored 1–2–4 with only a Tatnall (Delaware) girl preventing a 1–2–3 Fayetteville–Manlius sweep.

Saratoga High School finished runner-up with 104 points for the fourth New York 1–2 finish in NXN history. Fayetteville–Manlius had scored a perfect 15 at the New York state championships, then scored 28 at NXN-New York Regional. They scored one point less at the national finals than they did at regionals.

Courtney Chapman, the only senior in the Fayetteville–Manlius lineup, is the only runner ever to win five team national titles. Chapman was a part of Fayetteville–Manlius's first national title in 2006 as an eighth-grader. Eighth-graders are allowed to participate if state association rules permit them to do so.

Fayetteville: 1 + 2 + 4 + 8 + 12 = 27 points

Rest of NXN field: 3 + 5 + 6 + 7 + 9 = 30 points

GIRLS' TEAM STANDINGS
Place	Club	School	Location	Score
1	Manlius XC Club	Fayetteville–Manlius High School	Manlius, New York	27
2	Kinetic XC Club	Saratoga Springs High School	Saratoga Springs, New York	104
3	Newhall XC Club	Saugus High School	Santa Clarita, California	117

==== 2011 ====
The eighth running of the Nike Cross Nationals was held on December 3, 2011. The meet was once again held at Portland Meadows.

In a contrast to 2010, the course was much less sloppy and consequently, times were much faster.

For the second year in a row, the individual Midwest regional champion won the national title. With Verzbicas having graduated, Futsum Zienasellaissie of Indiana set the NXN course record in 15:03, bettering Craig Lutz's time by six seconds and running almost a full minute faster than Verzbicas did the previous year to win NXN. An astounding nineteen of the first twenty-one runners were individual qualifiers from regions around the nation.

In the team race, it came down to Christian Brothers Academy (New Jersey) and Southlake Carroll (Texas) for the championship. With a four-point margin of victory, Christian Brothers Academy became the first New Jersey team to claim a national championship with 91 points. Carroll finished with 95 points, earning the third podium finish for Texas in NXN history. Davis (Utah) claimed the first Utah podium spot by taking third place with 157 points.

BOYS' TEAM STANDINGS
Place	Club	School	Location	Score
1	Lincroft XC Club	Christian Brothers Academy	Lincroft, New Jersey	91
2	Carroll XC Club	Carroll Senior High School	Southlake, Texas	95
3	Davis XC Club	Davis High School	Kaysville, Utah	157

The girls' race also proved to be quick compared to the previous year, with Sarah Baxter (California) claiming the girls' championship in 17:38, a full forty seconds faster than 2010, which saw no runners break 18 minutes. After Baxter, it was all New York.

New York continued their stranglehold atop the podium for girls' teams. For the first seven years of NXN, a New York girls' team had claimed the championship. Furthermore, in four of those years (2005, 2006, 2009, and 2010), a New York team also claimed runner-up status to the champion. The same storyline occurred yet again in 2011.

However, unlike 2010, there would not be complete and total domination by Fayetteville–Manlius en route to the championship, as Saratoga would give Fayetteville–Manlius their toughest fight yet for the win. After scoring a mere 27 points in 2010 and winning by 77 points over Saratoga, Fayetteville–Manlius scored 60 points (still the second-lowest of their championship scores) and won by "just" 24 points for their sixth consecutive national championship. For the third year in a row, with 84 points, Saratoga was relegated to bridesmaid status to Fayetteville–Manlius, which also marked the fifth time in eight years that New York had gone 1–2 in the team standings in the national championship.

Nearly one hundred points behind the two New York superpowers was a tie between Tatnall (Delaware) and New Trier (Illinois). Tatnall won the third-place trophy on the sixth-runner tiebreaker, giving the school their second podium finish in their history.

GIRLS' TEAM STANDINGS
Place	Club	School	Location	Score
1	Manlius XC Club	Fayetteville–Manlius High School	Manlius, New York	60
2	Kinetic XC Club	Saratoga Springs High School	Saratoga, New York	84
3*	Wilmington XC Club	Tatnall School	Wilmington, Delaware	182
4*	Wilmette Running Club	New Trier High School	Wilmette, Illinois	182

- Tatnall School gets third place podium finish on sixth-runner tiebreaker

==== 2012 ====
The ninth annual edition of the Nike Cross Nationals was held on December 1, 2012, once again at Portland Meadows, Oregon.

In 2012, the universal word out of Portland Meadows on the conditions was "MUDDY!" Indeed, the girls' race would turn out to be one of the slowest races in NXN history, as defending champion Sarah Baxter of Simi Valley would repeat her title in 19:17, a time that was more than a minute-and-a-half slower than her 2011 time of 17:38. Mary Cain of New York would finish second, and Katie Knight from Washington would earn third place for the second year in a row in the sloppy course conditions.

Although the conditions were vastly different from the previous year, and two of the three individual podium finishers would repeat their finishes from the previous year, one thing would stay the same in the team race: Fayetteville–Manlius.

The Southlake Carroll (Texas) girls would earn their third podium finish in team history by finishing second, just one year after their boys' team finished just four points out of a national championship. The girls of Carmel, Indiana would earn the Midwest girls' first podium finish in NXN history after Wilmette XC Club (New Trier High School, Illinois) had tied for third with Wilmington XC Club (Tatnall School, Delaware) but finished fourth on the sixth-runner tiebreaker.

Those two teams, however, like the rest of the field, finished far in the rear-view mirror of the Fayetteville–Manlius dynasty. For the seventh year in a row, Fayetteville–Manlius would win the national championship. After winning by "just" 24 points over in-state rival Saratoga Springs, the Fayetteville–Manlius girls would leave no doubt in 2012: They scored 54 points and won by an astounding 144 points over Carroll, their largest margin of victory to date.

Also out of New York, East Aurora (who earned an at-large bid to NXN) would finish three points behind Carmel for fourth place, while Saratoga would finish six points behind East Aurora for fifth place, giving New York three teams in the top five.

GIRLS' TEAM STANDINGS
Place	Club	School	Location	Score
1	Manlius XC Club	Fayetteville–Manlius High School	Manlius, New York	54
2	Carroll XC Club	Carroll Senior High School	Southlake, Texas	198
3	Carmel XC Club	Carmel High School	Carmel, Indiana	209

Whereas in the girls' race it was almost as if it were business as usual, in the boys' race, the mud was even worse and led to surprising results: Sam Wharton of Ohio won in 17:08, which was more than two minutes slower than the winning time in the previous year and is the slowest winning time ever in boys' NXN history. Wharton's victory was the third consecutive year a Midwest runner has won the championship and the fifth time in nine years that a Midwest runner has won the individual boys' national championship.

In the team competition, Christian Brothers Academy (New Jersey) was aiming to become the first boys' team to repeat as national champions and at the same time, become the first boys' team to win two national titles. Unfortunately for them, that was not to be: In fact, they would finish fourth, 21 points out of a podium spot.

After eight different winners in the previous eight years of NXN, Arcadia XC Club of California became the first school in boys' NXN history to win a second national title, earning their second national title in three years with 108 after their previous championship in 2010. American Fork XC Club would earn a podium finish in second place, scoring 122. American Fork's podium finish is the second podium finish for Utah in as many years, and improved upon Davis' third-place finish from the previous year. The 2008 national champions, North Spokane XC Club from Washington, would finish third with 146 points.

BOYS' TEAM STANDINGS
Place	Club	School	Location	Score
1	Arcadia XC Club	Arcadia High School	Arcadia, California	108
2	American Fork XC Club	American Fork High School	American Fork, Utah	122
3	North Spokane XC Club	North Central High School	Spokane, Washington	146

2012 NXN Finals Qualifiers: 2012 NXN Finals Qualifiers

==== 2013 ====
The tenth annual edition of Nike Cross Nationals took place on December 7, 2013, once again at Portland Meadows.

Complete list of team and individual qualifiers for the 2013 NXN Finals: 2013 NXN Final Qualifiers

In a complete reversal from 2012, Portland Meadows' course this year featured not mud, but snow. On a cold, windy day, teams and individuals from around the country converged on Portland Meadows.

Girls

In the girls' race, three individuals quickly broke away from the pack: two-time defending individual champion Sarah Baxter of Simi Valley (California), Alexa Eframison, who qualified out of the Northwest Regional, and Elise Cranny, another individual qualifier out of the Southwest Regional. The trio would all go under 17 minutes, more than thirty seconds ahead of the chase pack. Eframison won the individual race with a great kick at the end, taking the championship in 16:50. Cranny followed Eframison in 16:53 and defending champion Baxter finished third in 16:57. The win by Eframison—who hails from Washington state—turned out to be a sign of things to come in the boys' race.

In the team battle, Fayetteville–Manlius was on pace for an eighth consecutive championship, but Wayzata out of Minnesota (Heartland Champion) had other plans in the last kilometer. In the end, the Fayetteville–Manlius streak was over at seven (and the New York team championship streak ended at nine) straight by a margin of just twelve points: Wayzata took home the championship with 108 points, and Fayetteville–Manlius finished second with 120. Davis (Utah) rounded out the podium finishers with 157 points.

GIRLS' TEAM STANDINGS
Place	Club	School	Location	Score
1	Wayzata XC Club	Wayzata High School	Plymouth, Minnesota	108
2	Manlius XC Club	Fayetteville–Manlius High School	Manlius, New York	120
3	Davis (UT) XC Club	Davis High School	Kaysville, Utah	157

Boys

In the boys' race, however, the individual and team races both featured storylines from Washington. The individual champion—putting an end to a streak of three consecutive champions out of the Midwest at NXN—was Taylor Wilmot of North Spokane XC Club, who won in a very quick 15:00. In fact, North Spokane XC Club took two of the top three podium spots, as Wilmot's teammate, Tanner Anderson ended up taking third place. The North Spokane duo was broken up by Blake Haney, an individual qualifier from California.

In the team race, Washington claimed top honors as Gig XC Club (Gig Harbor High School) out of Washington thwarted Christian Brothers' Academy of New Jersey's bid to become the second boys' team to win two national titles. The Gig Harbor boys took home the title with 111 points, followed by Lincroft XC Club (CBA) with 139. In a bit of a surprise, Brentwood XC Club (Brentwood, Tennessee) became the first boys' team from the Southeast to earn a podium spot by finishing third with 174 points.

BOYS' TEAM STANDINGS
Place	Club	School	Location	Score
1	Gig XC Club	Gig Harbor High School	Gig Harbor, Washington	111
2	Lincroft XC Club	Christian Brothers Academy	Lincroft, New Jersey	139
3	Brentwood XC Club	Brentwood High School	Brentwood, Tennessee	174

==== 2014 ====
GIRLS' TEAM STANDINGS
Place	Club	School	Location	Score
1	Manlius XC Club	Fayetteville–Manlius High School	Manlius, New York	70
2	Temecula XC Club	Great Oak High School	Temecula, California	149
3	Carmel XC Club	Carmel High School	Carmel, Indiana	173

BOYS' TEAM STANDINGS
Place	Club	School	Location	Score
1	Manlius XC Club	Fayetteville–Manlius High School	Manlius, New York	111
2	Wayzata XC Club	Wayzata High School	Plymouth, Minnesota	159
3	North Spokane XC Club	North Central High School	Spokane, Washington	178

==== 2015 ====
GIRLS' TEAM STANDINGS
Place	Club	School	Location	Score
1	Manlius XC Club	Fayetteville-Manlius High School	Manlius, New York	55
2	Davis (CA) XC Club	Davis Senior High School	Davis, California	144
3	Temecula XC Club	Great Oak High School	Temecula, California	171

BOYS' TEAM STANDINGS
Place	Club	School	Location	Score
1	Temecula XC Club	Great Oak High School	Temecula, California	114
2	American Fork XC Club	American Fork High School	American Fork, Utah	163
3	Dana Point XC Club	Dana Hills High School	Dana Point, California	181

Great Oak captured a national title in their first NXN appearance.

==== 2016 ====
GIRLS' TEAM STANDINGS
Place	Club	School	Location	Score
1	Manlius XC Club	Fayetteville-Manlius High School	Manlius, New York	41
2	Davis (CA) XC Club	Davis Senior High School	Davis, California	181
3	Temecula XC Club	Great Oak High School	Temecula, California	185

The Fayetteville–Manlius girls won their 10th national title in the past 11 years, and their third in a row.

BOYS' TEAM STANDINGS
Place	Club	School	Location	Score
1	Bozeman XC Club	Bozeman High School	Bozeman, Montana	105
2	American Fork XC Club	American Fork High School	American Fork, Utah	141
3	Brentwood XC Club	Brentwood High School	Brentwood, Tennessee	163

==== 2017 ====
GIRLS' TEAM STANDINGS
Place	Club	School	Location	Score
1	Manlius XC Club	Fayetteville-Manlius High School	Manlius, New York	89
2	North Naperville XC Club	Naperville North High School	Naperville, Illinois	94
3	Vail Valley XC Club	Battle Mountain High School	Minturn, Colorado	162

BOYS' TEAM STANDINGS
Place	Club	School	Location	Score
1	Purcellville XC Club	Loudoun Valley High School	Purcellville, Virginia	89
2	Manlius XC Club	Fayetteville-Manlius High School	Manlius, New York	159
3	Denver XC Club	Mountain Vista High School	Denver, Colorado	163

==== 2018 ====
GIRLS' TEAM STANDINGS
Place	Club	School	Location	Score
1	Central Oregon XC Club	Summit High School	Bend, Oregon	120
2	North Naperville XC Club	Naperville North High School	Naperville, Illinois	186
3	Wayzata XC Club	Wayzata High School	Wayzata, Minnesota	207

BOYS' TEAM STANDINGS
Place	Club	School	Location	Score
1	Purcellville XC Club	Loudoun Valley High School	Purcellville, Virginia	77
2	Temecula XC Club	Great Oak High School	Temecula, California	114
3	Littleton XC Club	Dakota Ridge High School	Littleton, Colorado	115

Loudoun Valley High School became the first boys team in NXN history to repeat as NXN champions, having won the year before.

==== 2019 ====
The meet was held on Saturday, December 7, 2019.

The girls race, with Katelyn Tuohy winning her third consecutive national title, was the closest in history. In a race that came down to a sprint finish, one second separated the top three finishers. Tuohy won the race in a time of 17:18.4, with Taylor Ewert of Beavercreek, Ohio finishing second in 17:19.1 and Sydney Thorvaldson of Rawlins, Wyoming finishing third in 17:19.4. Tuohy, as she had done the last two years, started the race with a sizeable gap. However, she was nearly caught by Ewert and Thorvaldson as they used the second half of the race to close the gap to less than a second. On the team side, Kinetic won their second national title with four girls finishing in the top 40 of the overall race and the top 12 of the scoring runners. Kinetic's first four runners all broke 18:30 for 5K, with their top finisher, Ella Kurto, finishing in under 18 minutes. Historically dominant Fayetteville-Manlius finished 7th, their worst ever finish at NXN. Kinetic became the only other team aside from rival NY powerhouse, Fayetteville-Manlius, to win NXN three times (2004 girls, 2005 boys, 2019 girls).

GIRLS' TEAM STANDINGS
Place	Club	School	Location	Score
1	Kinetic	Saratoga Springs	Saratoga Springs, New York	78
2	Central Oregon	Summit High School	Bend, Oregon	160
3	Niwot	Niwot	Niwot, Colorado	171

The boys race was supposed to one for the ages with Nico Young, Cole Sprout, and Josh Methner coming off of historic seasons and careers. Instead, Nico Young was away from the field at 1 km and did not look back, setting a course record on a day where rain fell steadily for the entirety of the race. He was given a speed rating of 205 by "Tully Runners," indicating the best performance by a high school boy since Drew Hunter in 2015. On the team side, Newbury Park won on the back of Young and fellow All-American teammate, Jace Aschbrenner. They overcame strong competition from a deep Great Oak team and a Corner Canyon team who added All-American transfer, Easton Allred, at the start of the year. This marked the end of the Loudoun Valley dynasty, after a poor showing, finishing 10th.

BOYS' TEAM STANDINGS
Place	Club	School	Location	Score
1	Newbury Park XC	Newbury Park	Newbury Park, California	128
2	Temecula XC	Great Oak High School	Temecula, California	132
3	Draper	Corner Canyon High School	Draper, Utah	142

==== 2020 and 2021 ====
Due to the COVID-19 pandemic, the 2020 Nike Cross Nationals meet, along with the 2020 Nike Cross Regional meets, was officially canceled on July 16, 2020. Continued concerns over COVID-19 led to the cancelation of the 2021 Nike Cross Nationals meet, announced in September.

==== 2022 ====
The 2022 edition of the Nike Cross Nationals meet was held on December 3, 2022.

BOYS' TEAM STANDINGS
Place	Club	School	Location	Score
1	Newbury Park XC	Newbury Park	Newbury Park, California	66
2	Portland XC	Jesuit High School	Portland, Oregon	152
3	Herriman XC	Herriman	Herriman, Utah	155

==== 2023 ====
2023 Nike Cross Nationals was held on December 2, 2023, at Glendoveer Golf Course in Portland, Oregon. Herriman High School of Herriman, Utah won the Boys Championship with 83 points. American Fork High School, also of Utah, were heavy favorites going into the race after beating Herriman at the Utah State Championship meet, but finished in second with 100 points. The race was best remembered for being held in swampy conditions, with a large puddle (approximately 50 by 25 meters) being present on the course.

Boys Final Results
Place	Club	School	Location	Score
1	Herriman XC	Herriman High School	Herriman, UT	83
2	American Fork XC	American Fork High School	American Fork, UT	100
3	Carroll High School XC	Carroll High School	Southlake, TX	138

==== 2024 ====
Jane Hedengren was the spotlight of the meet, winning in a new course record of 16:32 over Victoria Garces in 17:13, despite the muddy conditions. Charlie Vause won the men's field in 15:28. Notably, Hedengren would have placed 86th out of 197 boys.

==== 2025 ====
Jackson Spencer and Natasza Dudek won nationals at Glendoveer Golf Course. Niwot (CO) won as a team for the second consecutive year in the lowest winning score of NXN history, at 61 points to overtake Herriman (Utah)'s 97 points. Wayzata won on the girls side with 142 points, their second national title and the first since 2013.

== Trivia ==
- Katelyn Tuohy, from New York, is the only athlete to have won NXN three consecutive times.
- Purcellville XC Club (Loudoun Valley High School) and Real Training XC Club (Niwot High School) are the only boys teams to win consecutive national championships, Purcellville accomplishing the feat in 2017 and 2018 and Real Training in 2024 and 2025.
- Manlius XC Club (Fayetteville–Manlius High School) was, until 2022, the only girls team to win consecutive national championships. Fayetteville–Manlius won back-to-back national championships, they won seven consecutive national championships from 2006 to 2012, and added four more in a row in 2014, 2015, 2016 and 2017 for a total of eleven national championships in twelve seasons from 2006 through 2017.
- Saratoga Springs is the only other girls team to win multiple national titles, having won the inaugural title in 2004, then again in 2019 and 2022.
- In 2013, Wayzata XC Club (Wayzata High School) became the first girls' team that did not hail from the state of New York to win a national title. That same year (2013), Fayetteville–Manlius finished second for their eighth consecutive top-two finish in eight tries at NXN.
- Arcadia XC Club (Arcadia High School) became the first boys' team to win multiple national titles in 2012 to go along with their 2010 national championship.
- Casey Clinger, from Utah, is the only boy to win two national championships.
- Sarah Baxter, from California, is the first athlete to have won two national championships, doing so in 2011 and 2012.
- From the first NXN in 2004, fifteen of the seventeen girls' national team champions have been team from the state of New York. Saratoga won the inaugural one, Hilton the second, Fayetteville–Manlius eleven of the twelve from 2006 to 2017, and Kinetic won the most recent two in 2019 and 2022.
- In five of the first ten championships (2005, 2006, 2009–2011) in NXN history, New York girls' teams have won the championship and claimed runner-up status in the team standings. Three times, it has been the Fayetteville–Manlius winning the championship and Saratoga placing second to Fayetteville–Manlius in the girls' race.
- Nike Cross Nationals is an unofficial national race, and because of this schools are not allowed to use their actual school name. In most cases schools will use their city name plus "XC Club."
- Course records are held by Aaron Sahlman (California) in 14:44 (2022) and Jane Hedengren (Utah) in 16:32 (2024)
- Aaron Sahlman's course-record time of 14:44 was the only cross-country race he won in his entire high school career.
- Washington has the most podium finishes for the boys, with seven, after North Central's 2014 third-place finish. Three different high schools in the city of Spokane, Washington, account for six of these podium finishes. Illinois is second with five.
- New York leads the way with seventeen podium finishes for the girls. Texas and California are tied for second with three apiece.
- The Fayetteville–Manlius girls have more national championships than any other TEAM, boys or girls (or even combined) has PODIUM finishes.
- Illinois also has the most individual winners for either gender, with three boys winning the individual championship.
- Texas has had four individual championships, with two for each gender.
- Utah boys and New York girls have each been responsible for three individual champions in a row, but a single runner won multiple championships in each of those cases. Casey Clinger won back-to-back titles in 2015 and 2016 with Aidan Troutner winning in 2017. Meanwhile, Katelyn Tuohy won three consecutive national titles between 2017 and 2019.
- The Midwest region has the most boys' individual national championships with five.
- The Midwest has also won three consecutive individual national titles from 2010 to 2012.
- The Heartland region is tied with the New York region for the most girls' individual national championships with three.
- The highest point total to win NXN is 195 points by Boerne (Texas) boys in the 2009 edition of NXN.
- For the girls, the highest point total is to win a championship was set by Fayetteville–Manlius, when they scored 128 points to win the first of seven consecutive championships in 2006.
- The lowest score ever to win NXN is 27 points, set in 2010 by the then four-time defending champion Fayetteville–Manlius (New York) girls for their fifth consecutive title. The Fayetteville–Manlius girls would have beaten the other 21 teams in the field if they had scored as one team - by three points.
- Niwot (Colorado) set the lowest winning score for a boys team in 2025, scoring just 61 points to win over Herriman (Utah), breaking Newbury Park (California)'s record of 66 points.
- The lowest non-winning point totals in NXN history both occurred in 2011, with Southlake Carroll (Texas) scoring 95 points in the boys' championship, and four-time runners-up Saratoga Springs scoring 84 points in the girls' championship.
- The closest team score is two points on the boys side, when Neuqua Valley (Illinois) won over Los Alamos (New Mexico) in 2007, 125–127. On the girls side, the closest team score is five points, when Fayetteville-Manlius won their eleventh (and most recent) national title in 2017, over Naperville North (Illinois), 89–94.
- The largest gap between first and second place teams is 140 points, set by the Fayetteville-Manlius girls en route to their tenth national title in 2016, scoring 41 points to Davis (California)'s 181. On the boys side, the biggest spread between first and second place is 86 points, set by Newbury Park (California) in 2022 en route to winning their second consecutive national title over Jesuit (Oregon), 66–152.
