= Husky Track =

- Interactive map of Husky Track
- Address: 4106 Walla Walla Rd; Seattle, WA, 98195
- Location: University of Washington (Washington (state)) Seattle, Washington, U.S.
- Coordinates: 47.65681°N 122.29827°W
- Owner: University of Washington
- Operator: University of Washington

Construction
- Opened: 2013

The Husky Track is a track and field stadium located on the campus of the University of Washington in Seattle, Washington that has served as the home of Washington Huskies track and field since 2013.

From 1920 to 2012, the track was located inside Husky Stadium until it was removed in a major renovation. The new track was constructed on a landfill near swampland and required underground supports. It was opened on April 27, 2013, to host a meet with in-state rival Washington State.

== Facilities ==
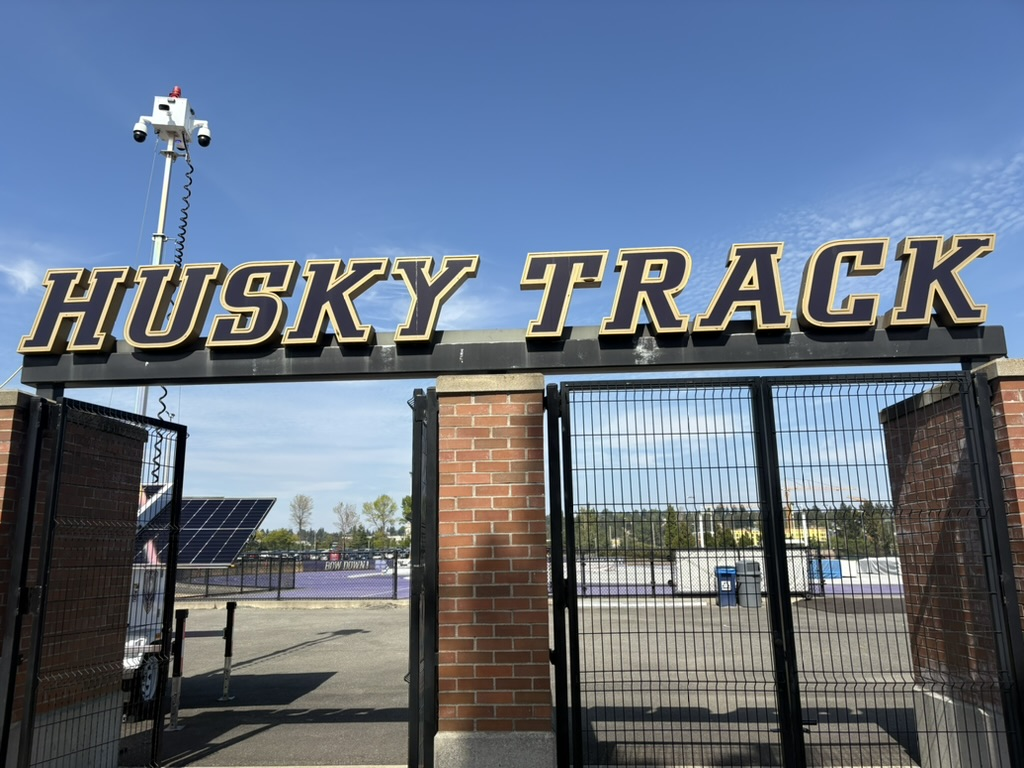
Track entrance

The eight lane track is Husky purple to match the school's color scheme. Each lane is the maximum allowable width of 48 inches. The infield contains areas for throwing and jumping, allowing all events to be competed within the grounds. Bleachers are located on the south side of the facility and there is standing room for viewing outside the fence encircling the track.

== Events ==
Apart for being used for team practices, The track has hosted the 2022 WAC championships and the 2019 and 2022 Brooks PR Invitational. Although the university team does not often compete in meets at the track, they do host annual meets at the Dempsey Indoor Facility during the winter season.
