= Nike Outdoor Nationals =

American high school athletics championship

- Genre: Outdoor Track & Field
- Frequency: Annually
- Venue: Hayward Field
- Locations: Eugene, Oregon
- Country: United States
- Sponsor: Nike, Inc.

Nike Outdoor Nationals, abbreviated as NON, is an American middle school and high school track and field championship meeting which takes place annually at Hayward Field in Eugene, Oregon. Since 1990, the National Scholastic Athletic Foundation has organized a national invitational championship meet in the United States and has been the host of many national records. The meeting is managed by the NSAF, and sanctioned by the USATF.

Nike Indoor Nationals, which takes place at the Fort Washington Avenue Armory in New York City, is the indoor counterpart to Nike Outdoor Nationals.

The meeting was previously sponsored by New Balance. However, in 2022 there was a sponsorship change. New Balance would go on to sponsor a new national high school meeting and kept the same meeting name the New Balance Nationals Outdoor.

== Notable athletes ==
- Jane Hedengren, U20 and high school distance record holder
- Jessica Beard, sprinter who qualified for the 2009 IAAF World Championships
- Sarah Brown, middle distance runner
- Sydney McLaughlin, hurdler and sprinter holding the 400m hurdles world record

== Meet records ==
=== Boys ===
Event	Record	Athlete	School	Date	Place	Notes
100 m	10.01 (+1.3 m/s)	(United Kingdom) Jake Odey-Jordan	Samuel Clemens High School	20 June 2026	Eugene	
200 m	20.41	Trentavis Friday	Cherryville High School	2014		
400 m	45.38	LaShawn Merritt	Woodrow Wilson High School	2004		
800 m	1:45.45	Cooper Lutkenhaus	Justin Northwest High School	21 June 2025		High School Record
Mile	4:00.52	Quentin Nauman	Western Dubuque High School	22 June 2025		
2 mile	8:34.40	German Fernandez	Riverbank High School	2008		2nd fastest in high school
5000 m	14:04.49	Corbin Coombs	Organ Mountain High School	20 June 2025		
110 m hurdles	13.32	Ricardo Moody	Harrison High School	1999		10th fastest in high school
400 m hurdles	49.78	Reggie Wyatt	La Sierra High School	2009		5th fastest in high school
2000 m steeplechase	5:41.67	Bailey Roth	Coronado High School	2014		2nd fastest in high school
1 mile walk	6:11.05	Benjamin Shorey	Ellsworth High School	2001		
4 × 100 m relay	39.80		Oscar Dean Wyatt High School	1998		2nd fastest in high school
4 × 200 m relay	1:23.67		Oscar Dean Wyatt High School	1998		7th fastest in high school
4 × 400 m relay	3:08.05		New Bern High School	2009		2nd fastest in high school
4 × 800 m relay	7:28.75	Christopher Hall 1:53.00; Myles Andrews 1:52.79; Aaron Harris 1:55.27; Christian Penn 1:47.71	Long Beach Polytechnic High School	2011		High School Record
4 × mile relay	17:04.55		Ogden High School	2016		6th fastest in high school
4 × 110 m shuttle hurdle relay	56.63		Union Catholic High School	2013		
800 m sprint medley relay	1:28.20		New Bern High School	2009		High School Record
1600 m sprint medley relay	3:20.25		Oak Park High School	2017		2nd fastest in high school
Distance medley relay	9:49.78	Richard Smith 3:03.2 (1200m); Justin Smyser 50.2 (400m); Kanda Karmo 1:56.6 (800m); Alan Webb 3:59.80 (1600m)	South Lakes High School	2001		High School Record
High jump	2.24 m (7 ft 4.50 in)	Paul Klemic	Mainland High School	2000		
Pole vault	5.50 m (18 ft 0.50 in)	KC Lightfoot	Lee's Summit High School	2018		
Long jump	7.79 m (25 ft 6.75 in)	Maurice English	Sumter High School	1998		
Triple jump	16.03 m (52 ft 7.25 in)	Marquis Dendy	Middletown High School	2010		
Shot put	23.16 m (76 ft)	Jordan Geist	Knoch High School	2017		
Discus throw	68.02 m (223 ft 2 in)	Turner Washington	Canyon del Oro High School	2017		8th furthest in high school
Decathlon	7090 pts	Peyton Haack	Westfield High School	2017		

=== Girls ===
Event	Record	Athlete	School	Date	Notes
100 m	11.19	Tamari Davis	Oak Hall High School	2019	
200 m	22.94	Chalonda Goodman	Newnan High School	2008	
400 m	51.17	Kayla Davis	Providence Day School	2019	
800 m	2:02.76	Chanelle Price	Easton High School	2013	
1 mile	4:33.87	Katelyn Tuohy	North Rockland High School	2018	High School Record
3000 m	8:40.03	Jane Hedengren	Timpview High School	21 June 2025	USA U20 and High School Record|
2 mile	9:54.22	Aisling Cuffe	Cornwall Central High School	2011	
5000 m	15:55.94	Wesley Frazier	Ravenscroft High School	2013	9th fastest in high school
2000 m steeplechase	6:34.69	Mary Kate Anselmini	Ward Melville High School	2011	
1 mile walk	6:55.23	Lauren Harris	Sachem East High School	2016	
100 m hurdles	13.01	Chanel Brissett	Cheltenham High School	2016	10th fastest in high school
400 m hurdles	54.22	Sydney McLaughlin	Union Catholic High School	2017	4th fastest in high school
4 × 100 m relay	44.88		Bullis High School	2017	9th fastest in high school
4 × 200 m relay	1:34.23		Nansemond River High School	2016	4th fastest in high school
4 × 400 m relay	3:35.90		Union Catholic High School	2015	5th fastest in high school
4 × 800 m relay	8:46.98		Fayetteville-Manlius High School	2010	High School Record
4 × mile relay	19:58.07		Roxbury High School	2006	2nd fastest in high school
4 × 100 m shuttle hurdle relay	54.67		Western Branch High School	2018	
800 m sprint medley relay	1:40.95		William Penn High School	2003	2nd fastest in high school
1600 m sprint medley relay	3:47.54		Rush-Henrietta High School	2017	High School Record
Distance medley relay	11:22.23	Amy Weissenbach 3:24.85 (1200m); K.C. Cord 58.45 (400m); Lauren Hansson 2:13.70 (800m); Cami Chapus 4:45.23 (1600m)	Harvard-Westlake High School	2011	High School Record
High jump	1.87 m (6 ft 2 in)	Amy Acuff	Calallen High School	1991/93	
Pole vault	4.19 m (13 ft 9 in)	Anna Watson	Olentangy Orange High School	2017	
Long jump	6.71 m (22 ft 0.5 in)	Kate Hall	Lake Region High School	2015	High School Record
Triple jump	13.44 m (44 ft 1.25 in)	Erica McLain	East High School	2004	
Shot put	17.25 m (56 ft 7.50 in)	Raven Saunders	Burke High School	2014	6th furthest in high school
Discus throw	68.02 m (179 ft 7 in)	Alyssa Wilson	Donovan Catholic High School	2017	
Heptathlon	5464 pts	Emma Fitsgerald	Thayer Academy	2016	
