= 3200 meters =

Long middle distance or short long distance running event

Athletics 3200 meters

World records
- Men: (Norway) Jakob Ingebrigtsen 7:51.35c (2023)
- Women: (Ethiopia) Meseret Defar 8:55.45c (2007)

3200 meters is an uncommon long middle-distance, or short long-distance, track and field running event that is 200 m longer than the much more common 3000 metre run, and slightly shorter than the two mile run.

At exactly eight laps on a standard 400 m track, or sixteen laps around an indoor 200 m track, this event is typically run only in American high schools, along with the 1600 m. It is the longest standardized event in track meets conducted by the NFHS in American high school competition. It is colloquially called the "two-mile", despite the distance being 18.688 meters shorter.

In college, the typical runner of this event would convert to the 5000-metre run, or potentially the 3000-metre run during the indoor season.

While World Athletics does not recognize an official world record or world best in the 3200 meters, the two mile run can be used as an approximation.

== American high school records (Note: References List of United States high school national records in track and field) ==
According to NFHS, the current male high school record holder in the 3200 m is Simeon Birnbaum of South Dakota, with a time of 8:34.10 in 2023.

However, there have been faster high school 3200 m times en route to two miles. Aforementioned Simeon Birnbaum ran an 8:31.73 3200 m en route to two miles, also in 2023. Even faster was Lukas Verzbicas, who ran an equivalent 8:26.50 3200 m en route to his high school two mile record of 8:29.46, in 2011, at the Prefontaine Classic.

Therefore, Birnbaum holds the record for the fastest 3200 m exclusively against other high schoolers and not en-route to two miles, while Verzbicas holds the record for fastest ever high school 3200 m (and two miles).

=== All-time outdoor top 15 high school boys' times (table credit: NFHS) (Note: In high school-only 3200 m races, and not en route to two miles. May not be perfectly up-to-date.) ===
Time	Athlete	State	Date & Location
8:31.80	Jackson Spencer	Utah	(Herriman) at Arcadia, CA, 4–11, 2026
8:34.10	Simeon Birnbaum	South Dakota	(Rapid City Stevens) at Arcadia, CA, 4–8, 2023
8:34.23	German Fernandez	California	(Riverbank) at Norwalk, CA, 2008
8:41.10	Dathan Ritzenhein	Michigan	(Rockford), 2000
8:43.32	Dathan Ritzenhein	Michigan	(Rockford), 2001
8:44.95	Eric Mastalir	California	(Sacramento Jesuit), 1986
8:46.08	Jeramy Elkaim	New Jersey	(Livingston), 2010
8:46.40	Luke Puskedra	Utah	(Slt. Lk. Cty. Judge Memorial), 2008
8:46.47	Andrew Bumbalough	Tennessee	(Brentwood Academy), 2004
8:46.70	Scott Fry	Ohio	(Sandusky Perkins), 1985
8:47.30	Caleb Webb	California	(Big Bear), 2015
8:47.40	Rheinhardt Harrison	Florida	(Ponte Vedra Beach Nease), 2021
8:48.55	Joe Rosa	New Jersey	(West Windsor-Plainsboro North), 2010
8:49.71	Ryan Sykes	New York	(White Plains High School), NY, May 8, 2026
8:49.88	Eric Reynolds	California	(Camarillo), 1983

Likewise, the current official female high school record holder in the 3200 m is Katelyn Touhy of New York, with a time of 9:47.88 in 2018.

However, in 2024, Elizabeth Leachman broke Touhy's record twice, first clocking 9:45.57 on February 1 and subsequently 9:43.74 on February 15. The NFHS has yet to ratify this record.

In 2020, en route to two miles, Dalias Frias ran a 9:47.27 equivalent 3200 m in her two mile high school record of 9:50.70, also faster than Touhy's record but still slower than Leachman's new records.

The fastest time ever recorded outdoors for a high school girl in the 3200 m only was by Brynn Brown in 2020, with a time of 9:39.91. However, this time was achieved with two male pacers, during an unofficial workout, on an uncertified course, and was not officially timed, nor officially measured.

Therefore, once ratified, Leachman's 9:43.74 will be the outdoor high school girls' 3200 m record.

However, on June 8, 2025, Jane Hedengren ran 9:17.75 for the two miles at the Brooks PR Invitational, which converts down to a 9:14.65 3200 m. Since this 3200 m split was en route to two miles, it is not eligible to be an NFHS 3200 metre record.

If indoor tracks are considered, Mary Cain's 2013 9:38.68 two mile time converts down to a 9:35.32 3200 m, and is the therefore the fastest 3200 m split ever recorded for a high school girl.

=== All-time outdoor top 19 high school girls' times (table credit: NFHS) ===
Time	Athlete	State	Date & Location
9:43.74	Elizabeth Leachman	Texas	(Boerne), 2-15, 2024
9:45.57	Elizabeth Leachman	Texas	(San Antonio), 2-1, 2024
9:47.88	Katelyn Touhy	New York	(Thiells North Rockland) at White Plains, NY, 5-11, 2018
9:48.59	Kimberly Mortensen	California	(Thousand Oaks) at Norwalk, CA, 1996
9:52.13	Jordan Hasay	California	(San Luis Obispo Mission Prep), 2008
9:52.51	Laurynne Chetelat	California	(Davis), 2008
9:53.79	Destiny Collins	California	(Great Oak), 2015
9:56.96	Kayla Beattie	Illinois	(Woodstock), 2011
9:58.74	Allie Ostrander	Alaska	(Kenai Central), 2015
9:58.77	Brynn Brown	Texas	(Denton Guyer), 2021
10:01.14	Fiona O'Keeffe	California	(Davis), 2015
10:03.07	Erin Keogh	Virginia	(McLean Langley), 1987
10:04.03	Christine Babcock	California	(Irvine Woodbridge), 2008
10:04.04	Jordan Hasay	California	(San Luis Obispo Mission Prep), 2007
10:04.20	Cory Schubert	California	(San Jose Del Mar), 1983
10:05.29	Jordan Hasay	California	(San Luis Obispo Mission Prep), 2009
10:05.58	Erin Keogh	Virginia	(McLean Langley), 1986
10:07.33	Claudia Lane	California	(Malibu), 2017
10:07.56	Jordan Hasay	California	(San Luis Obispo Mission Prep), 2006

== Equivalent world bests ==
=== Outdoor ===
Jakob Ingebrigtsen ran a converted equivalent of a 7:51.35 3200 m in his 2023 world best of 7:54.10 in the two mile run.

Meseret Defar ran a converted equivalent of an 8:55.46 3200 m in her 2007 world best of 8:58.58 in the two mile run.

=== Indoor ===
Josh Kerr ran a converted equivalent of a 7:57.88 3200 m in his 2024 world best of 8:00.67 in the two mile run.

Genzebe Dibaba ran a converted equivalent of an 8:57.35 3200 m in her 2014 world best of 9:00.48 in the two mile run.

== Relays ==
The term "3200 metre relay" usually refers to the 4 × 800 metre relay.

== See also ==
- 3000 metres
- 2 miles
- 1600 meters
