= Elizabeth Leachman =

American track and field athlete

Personal information
- Nationality: United States
- Born: January 20, 2008 (age 18)

Sport
- Sport: Athletics
- Event: Long distance running
- College team: Stanford Cardinal

Achievements and titles
- Personal bests: Mile: 4:48.55 (New York 2024); 3000 m: 9:16.84 (Lubbock 2024); 5000 m: 15:25.27 (Austin 2024)

Elizabeth Leachman (born January 20, 2008) is an American track and field athlete.

== Early life ==
She attends Samuel V. Champion High School in Boerne, Texas.

== Career ==
=== 2023 ===
In June, she became the first prep freshman female athlete to beat the 10-minute barrier in the 2-mile, lowering the ninth-grade national record to 9:57.65.

In December, she won the Foot Locker Cross Country Championships in San Diego finishing the course in 16:50, 14 seconds ahead of the second-place runner.

=== 2024–present ===
In February 2024, she broke the high school record set by Katelyn Tuohy over 3,200 meters by running 9:45.57. The following week, she broke her own record, and ended the month with the three fastest times ever set, breaking her own record again with a run of 9:43.74 at the Boerne Greyhound Relays.

In March 2024, she set a new American high school record indoor time of 15:28.90, again beating the mark set by Tuohy. Later that month, she set a new outdoor high school record over 5000 meters of 15:25.27.

She finished in 26th place in the 5000m at the United States Olympic Trials in Eugene, Oregon in June 2024.

On December 14, 2024, Leachman won the national girls Foot Locker Cross Country Championships, repeating her win of 2023.

In October 2025, Leachman was diagnosed with postural orthostatic tachycardia syndrome.

In November 2025, Leachman announced her commitment to attend Stanford University.
