= Cooper Lutkenhaus =

American track and field athlete (born 2008)

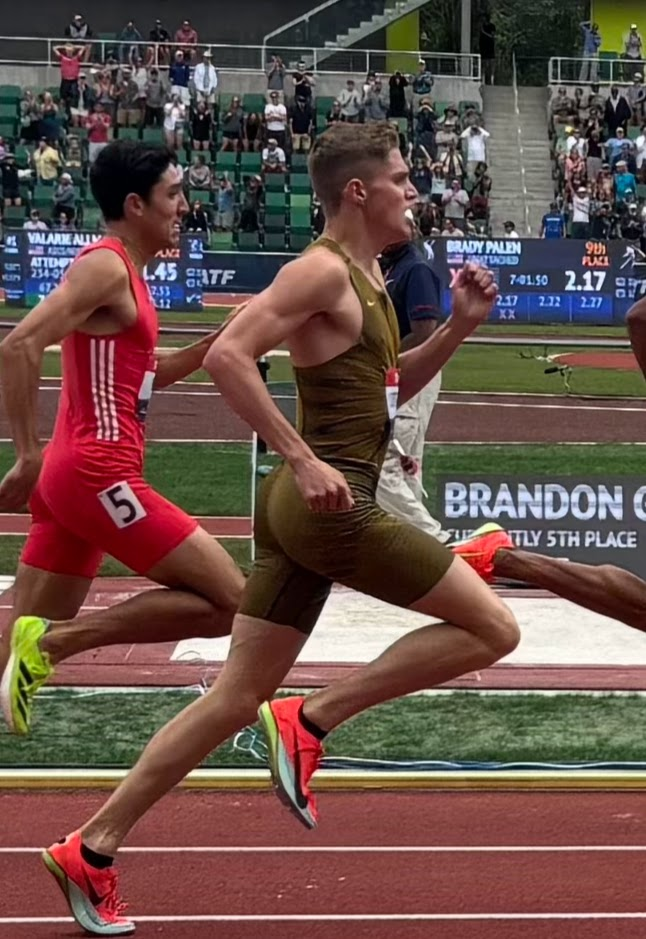
- Lutkenhaus (in green) competing in the 800 meter final at the 2025 USA Outdoor Track and Field Championships

Personal information
- Nationality: United States
- Born: December 19, 2008 (age 17)
- Education: Northwest High School (Texas)
- Agent: Ray Flynn

Sport
- Country: United States
- Sport: Athletics
- Events: 400m, 800m
- Club: Nike
- Turned pro: 2025
- Coached by: Chris Capeau (2024–present); Burke Binning (2023–2024)

Achievements and titles
- World finals: 2026 Torún; 800 m Sh, 1st
- National finals: 2025 Eugene; 800 m, 2nd 2026 New York; 800 m Sh, 1st
- Personal bests: All per athlete's World Athletics and MileSplit profiles.: Outdoor; 200 m: 22.12 (Justin 2024); 400 m: 46.30 (Austin 2025); 800 m: 1:42.08 WU18B AU20R (Oslo 2026); 1000 m: 2:23.57 (Justin 2025); 1500 m: 3:45.10 (Los Angeles 2026); Mile: 4:06.33 (Southlake 2025); Indoor; 600 m: 1:14.15 WU20R (New York 2026); 800 m: 1:44.03 WU20R (Winston-Salem 2026)
Medal record
Men's athletics
Representing the United States
World Indoor Championships
Gold medal – first place	2026 Torún	800 m

Cooper Lutkenhaus (born December 19, 2008) is an American track and field athlete who specializes in the 800 meters. The 2026 world indoor champion in this event, he holds the world under-18 record with a time of 1:42.08 set in 2026. Lutkenhaus also holds the world under-20 record in the short track 800 meters, with a time of 1:44.03 set in 2026.

In 2025, he became the youngest American to ever compete at the World Championships, having finished second in the 800 meter final at the 2025 USA Outdoor Track and Field Championships. He took first place in the same event at the 2026 national meet.

== Early life and background ==
Lutkenhaus comes from a family of athletes. His father George was the Class 1A state runner-up in the 1600 meters, and his brother Andrew was fourth at the Class 5A state meet and ran 1:50.04 for third in the 800 meters at Nike Outdoor Nationals as a high school senior in 2023. Lutkenhaus looks up to Bryce Hoppel, who set the American record in the 800 meters at the 2024 Summer Olympics, running 1:41.67.

Lutkenhaus attends Northwest High School in Justin, Texas, where both his parents are administrators (his father the school's director of athletics and his mother Patricia a class principal). In 2023, he joined the Nike Elite Program, a sponsorship initiative that provides mentorship, equipment, and competitive opportunities to 40 high school athletes annually.

== Middle and high school career ==
=== 2023–2024 ===
In spring 2023, as an eighth grader, Lutkenhaus won the 800 meters at the Brooks PR Invitational and Nike Outdoor Nationals in times of 1:54.20 and 1:53.59 respectively.

During his freshman year of high school from 2023 to 2024, Lutkenhaus finished 47th in the Class 5A cross country state meet, running 16:23.4 for 5 kilometers, which was won by Ethan Gonzalez in 14:55.8. Lutkenhaus went undefeated in the 800 meters, winning three national meets and a Texas Class 5A state title, which he won in 1:49.84. At the Brooks PR Invitational, Lutkenhaus set a new American high school freshman record and a new Texas high school state record in the 800 meters, running 1:47.58. That same season, Lutkenhaus also ran 47.33 for 400 meters.

Lutkenhaus began his sophomore season in August 2024 with a personal best of 4:14.17 in the 1600 meters, finishing in a final lap of 59.1 seconds.

=== 2025: 800 meter under-18 world best ===
On January 24, running against collegians at the Texas Tech Invite, Lutkenhaus set a new U.S. high school sophomore record in the indoor 800 meters, running 1:50.15. On February 8, Lutkenhaus competed in the professional 800 meters at the Millrose Games in New York City. He set a new indoor high school national record in the event, clocking 1:46.86, which broke Josh Hoey's previous record of 1:47.67 by almost a second. On March 16, he won the 800 meters at Nike Indoor Nationals, in a meet record of 1:47.83.

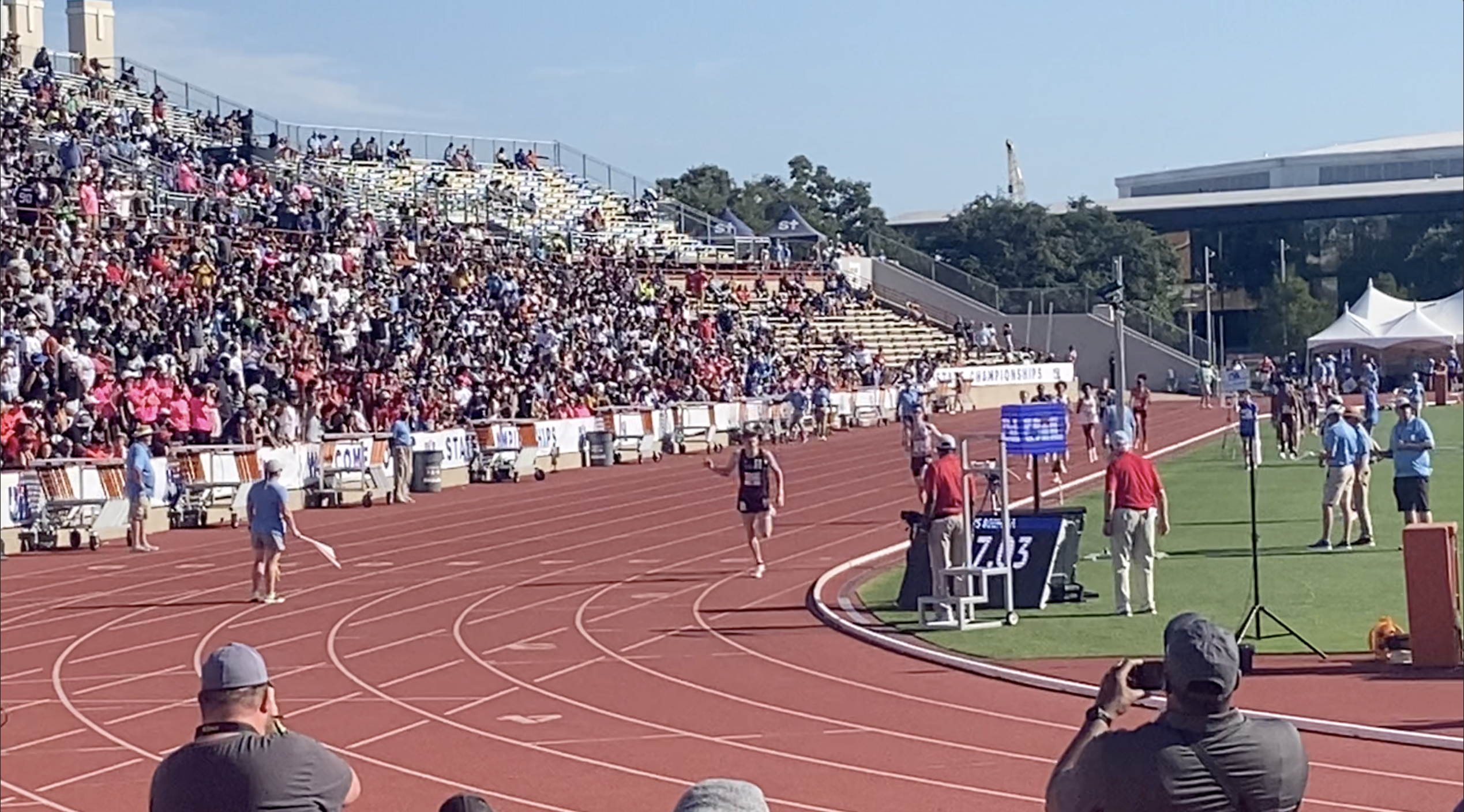
Lutkenhaus winning the Texas Class 6A 800 meters state title in 2025

In March, he was named the 2025 COROS MileSplit50 Indoor Athlete of the Year. In May, he won the Texas Class 6A 800 meters state title, in a new outdoor personal best of 1:47.04. He also finished second in the Class 6A 400 meters, in a personal best time of 46.30. Following the state meet, Lutkenhaus ran 4:06.33 for the mile at a postseason meeting.

On June 8, at the Brooks PR Invitational, Lutkenhaus broke Michael Granville's 29-year-old high school record of 1:46.45 in the 800 meters, running 1:46.26. Granville had previously claimed in 2024 that Lutkenhaus had the ability to break his record, and that Lutkenhaus had the talent to run 1:44 in the event before graduating high school. On June 21, he improved his record to 1:45.45 at Nike Outdoor Nationals.

On July 31, at the 2025 USA Outdoor Track and Field Championships, with a time of 1:47.14, Lutkenhaus finished second to Josh Hoey in his heat of the preliminaries, advancing him to the semifinals. In the semifinals the following day, with a time of 1:45.57, Lutkenhaus finished second to Bryce Hoppel in his heat after recovering from a stumble just after the 400 meter mark. Lutkenhaus' place automatically qualified him for the final, and makes him the youngest man to ever qualify for the U.S. final over the 800 meter distance.

In the final, Lutkenhaus finished second to Donavan Brazier, running a world-under 18 best of 1:42.27 and qualifying for the 2025 World Championships in Tokyo, Japan. He split 50.66 for the first 400 meters and 51.61 for the final 400 meters, the fastest closing lap of the field. He split 12.48 seconds for the final 100 meters, catching Brandon Miller, Hoey, and Hoppel. Lutkenhaus' time surpassed Mohammed Aman's previous world-under 18 best of 1:43.37 and makes him the fourth fastest American in history behind Brazier, Hoey, and Hoppel. As of October 2025, he is tied for nineteenth on the world all-time list with Ben Pattison, and is second on the world under-20 all-time list behind Nijel Amos. Lutkenhaus' performance has been compared to those of Jim Ryun and Alan Webb.

== Professional career ==
=== 2025 ===
In August, it was announced that Lutkenhaus signed a professional contract with Nike. In turning pro, Lutkenhaus forewent his high school and NCAA eligibility. He is represented by Ray Flynn and is the first American male middle-distance runner to turn pro while in high school. He remains coached by Chris Capeau.

In September, at the 2025 World Championships in Tokyo, Japan, Lutkenhaus was eliminated in the preliminary round of the 800 meters, finishing seventh in his heat. In competing, Lutkenhaus became the youngest American to compete at the World Championships, being younger than both Erriyon Knighton and Mary Cain, who were 18 and 17 years old respectively at their World Championship debuts.

=== 2026: World 800 meter indoor champion ===
On January 24, Lutkenhaus improved his short track 800 meter personal best to 1:45.23. On February 1, at the Millrose Games, Lutkenhaus broke the under-20 world record in the 600 meters, with a time of 1:14.15. On February 14, Lutkenhaus set a new under-20 world record of 1:44.03 in the indoor 800 meters at the ASICS Sound Invite.

On March 1, at the 2026 USA Indoor Track and Field Championships, Lutkenhaus won a national title over the short track 800 meters, with a time of 1:46.68. On March 22, with a time of 1:44.24, Lutkenhaus won a gold medal over the short track 800 meters at the 2026 World Indoor Championships in Toruń, Poland. In achieving this, Lutkenhaus became the youngest man to win a senior individual gold medal, indoors or outdoors.

In May, at the Sound Track Running Fest in Los Angeles, Lutkenhaus ran 3:45.10 over 1500 meters, his pro debut at the distance.

On June 7, at the Stockholm Diamond League, Lutkenhaus won the 800 meters over Marco Arop in a time of 1:42.70. The race was his Diamond League debut. On June 10, at the Oslo Diamond League, Lutkenhaus narrowly defeated Emmanuel Wanyonyi in a new world lead and personal best of 1:42.08 to Wanyonyi's 1:42.09.

== Awards and honors ==
- 2025: USATF Youth Athlete of the Year

== Achievements ==
=== International competitions ===
Year	Competition	Venue	Position	Event	Time	Ref
2025	World Championships	Japan National Stadium, Tokyo, Japan	7th (prelim)	800 m	1:47.68	
2026	World Indoor Championships	Kujawsko-Pomorska Arena, Toruń, Poland	1st	800 m	1:44.24	

=== Circuit wins and titles ===
==== Diamond League ====
Year	Competition	Venue	Position	Event	Time	Ref
2026	BAUHAUS-galan	Stockholm, Sweden	1st	800 m	1:42.70	
2026	Bislett Games	Oslo, Norway	1st	800 m	1:42.08 WL	

=== National championships ===
Year	Competition	Venue	Position	Event	Time	Ref
2025	Outdoor Track and Field Championships	Hayward Field, Eugene, Oregon	2nd	800 m	1:42.27 WU18B	
2026	Indoor Track and Field Championships	Ocean Breeze Athletic Complex, Staten Island, New York	1st	800m	1:46.68	
2026	Outdoor Track and Field Championships	Icahn Stadium, New York, New York	1st	800 m	1:43.48	
