= Brooks PR Invitational =

American high school track and field competition

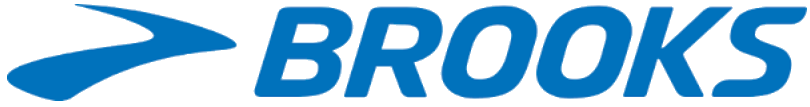
- Genre: Outdoor track and field
- Frequency: Annually
- Location: Seattle, Washington
- Country: United States
- Inaugurated: February 24, 2011
- Sponsor: Brooks

The Brooks PR Invitational is a championship American middle school and high school track and field meeting held annually in Seattle, Washington.

== Background ==
The meeting invites the top eight to sixteen fastest American middle school athletes and high school athletes of the year in each event to compete.

Events contested in the high school level include the 100 meters, 100 meter hurdles (girls), 110 meter hurdles (boys), 400 meters, 800 meters, one mile, and two miles. The middle school or junior level contests the 400 meters, 800 meters, and one mile.

It has been described by the St. Louis Post-Dispatch as "among the nation's most prestigious track meets".

== History ==
Brooks PR Invitational editions
Ed.	Year	Date	Venue	Ref.
1st	2011	February 24	Dempsey Indoor	
2nd	2012	February 26	Dempsey Indoor	
3rd	2013	February 24	Dempsey Indoor	
4th	2014	June 21	Renton Memorial Stadium	
5th	2015	June 19-20	Shoreline Stadium	
6th	2016	June 18	Renton Memorial Stadium	
7th	2017	June 17	Renton Memorial Stadium	
8th	2018	June 8	Shoreline Stadium	
9th	2019	June 15	Husky Track	
	2020	June 6	Cancelled	
10th	2021	July 2	Renton Memorial Stadium	
11th	2022	June 15	Husky Track	
12th	2023	June 14	Renton Memorial Stadium	
13th	2024	June 12	Renton Memorial Stadium	
14th	2025	June 8	Renton Memorial Stadium	

Brooks PR began on February 24, 2011 as an indoor track and field meeting, held on the Dempsey Indoor track at the University of Washington. In the years following, it was changed to an outdoor post-season meet held in the summer.

In 2022, Simeon Birnbaum became the 17th U.S. high schooler to run a sub-4-minute mile at the meeting, running 3:59.51.

At the 2024 edition of the meeting, Cooper Lutkenhaus set a new United States freshman record in the 800 meters at the meeting, clocking 1:47.58. Drew Griffth set a new meeting record in the two miles, running 8:31.46. Behind him, Tyrone Gorze broke Steve Prefontaine's Oregon state record in the event.

== Meeting records ==
=== Middle school (junior) ===
==== Boys ====
Event	Performance	Athlete	Date	Ref
400 m	48.66	Jaelen Hunter	2023	
800 m	1:54.20	Cooper Lutkenhaus	2023	
Mile	4:20.73	Sean Reith	2024	

==== Girls ====
Event	Performance	Athlete	Date	Ref
400	51.67	Camryn Dailey	8 June 2025	
800 m	2:09.02	Janae Coleman	2024	
Mile	4:47.96	Brianna Reilly	8 June 2025	

=== High school ===
==== Boys ====
Event	Performance	Athlete	Date	Ref
100 m	10.22 (+1.0 m/s)	Brayden Williams	8 June 2025	
110 m hurdles	13.29 (+1.2 m/s)	Le'Ezra Brown	8 June 2025	
400 m	45.70	Tavon Underwood	2023	
800 m	1:46.26	Cooper Lutkenhaus	8 June 2025	
Mile	3:59.51	Simeon Birnbaum	2022	
Two miles	8:31.46	Drew Griffith	2024	

==== Girls ====
Event	Performance	Athlete	Date	Ref
100 m	10.98	Candice Hill	2015	
100 m hurdles	13.13	Akala Garrett	2023	
400 m	52.01	Skyler Franklin	2024	
800 m	2:01.50	Paige Sheppard	8 June 2025	
Mile	4:35.69	Jane Hedengren	2023	
Two miles	9:17.75	Jane Hedengren	8 June 2025	
