= Katelyn Tuohy =

American long-distance runner

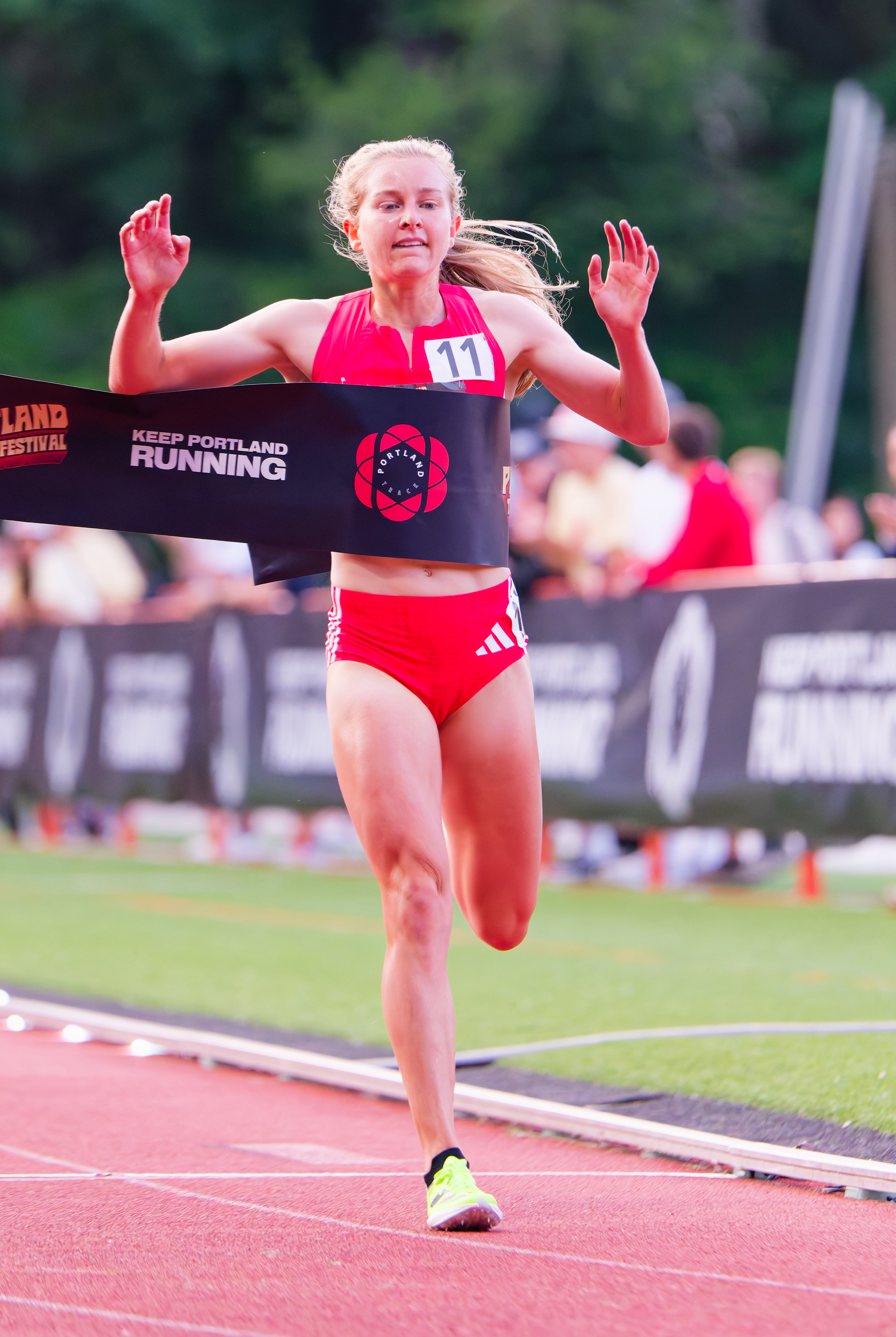
- Tuohy in 2025

Personal information
- Born: March 18, 2002 (age 24) New York, U.S.
- Home town: Thiells, New York, U.S.
- Employer: Adidas
- Height: 5 ft 4 in (1.63 m)

Sport
- Country: United States
- Sport: Track and Field, Cross Country
- Events: Middle-, Long-distance running
- Team: Adidas
- Turned pro: 2023

Achievements and titles
- Personal bests: Outdoors; 1500 m: 4:06.84 (Durham 2022); Mile: 4:45.61 (White Plains 2018); 3000 m: 9:09.71 (Cicero 2018); 5000 m: 15:03.12 (Walnut 2023); Indoors; 1500 m: 4:06.49i (New York 2023); Mile: 4:24.26i (New York 2023); 3000 m: 8:35.20i (New York 2023); 5000 m: 15:07.27i (Boston 2025)

Katelyn Tuohy (born March 18, 2002) is an American professional middle- and long-distance runner.

She is a four-time individual NCAA Division I champion. In high school Tuohy won five Gatorade Player of the Year awards and was the 2018 Track & Field News High School Girls Athlete of the Year.

== Early life and background ==
Katelyn Tuohy comes from suburban Rockland County, New York. She has two brothers: a younger brother, Ryan, and an older brother, Patrick, also a successful cross country runner for North Rockland High School, who now runs track at Fordham University.

At ten years old, while running with her parents, Patrick and Denise Tuohy, she was noticed by her future coach, Brian Diglio.

== Early career ==
Encouraged by her family, she began setting age-group records in the 7th grade, retiring marks set by earlier high school phenom Mary Cain.

=== 2017 ===
Tuohy attended and competed for the North Rockland High School Red Raiders. In the 2017 Cross Country season during the Manhattan College XC Invite, in the Bronx, New York, she took 32 seconds off the historic Van Cortlandt Park course record with a time of 13:21 for the 2.5 mile / 4 kilometer event. She then later won the Nike National cross country (NXN) championship on December 2, 2017, as a sophomore with a 5K time of 16:44.7 to cap an undefeated season. Tuohy won the event by 40 seconds, trimming 12 seconds off the course record, despite cold and muddy conditions. The Rockland County legislature honored her victory, declaring December 19 as "Katelyn Tuohy Day."

=== 2018 ===
On January 20, Tuohy set the U.S. national junior and high school 5000-meter record, when she ran 15:37.12, bettering the time of 15:45.46 set by Mary Cain in 2013.

=== Spring ===
In May, she became the fastest US high school outdoor 3200-meter runner of all time, running 9:47.88. In June, she ran the second fastest U.S. outdoor time ever in the country by a high school girl for 3000 meters with a time of 9:09.71. Also in June, on the 17th at the New Balance Nationals in Greensboro, North Carolina, Tuohy won the mile by over 15 seconds, breaking Polly Plumer's 36-year high school outdoor mile record with a 4:33.87.

=== Fall ===
On September 22, at the Ocean State Invitational, Tuohy ran the fastest American girls cross country 5K ever with a time of 16:06.87, lowering the course record by 88 s. Her time clipped almost 17 s from Katie Rainsberger's 2016 best-ever high school girls' standard on any course, running faster than all but one of over 1000 high school boys running the sandy course that day. On October 19, her 16:45.4 broke her own Bowdoin course record, set in 2017 while winning the state federation championship. The next fastest girl ran 19:07.9. On December 1, despite her missing her state section championship race with knee tendonitis, a few weeks earlier, she repeated as Nike's Cross Nationals Individual Champion. Notwithstanding muddy conditions, she set a new course record time of 16:37.8. Tuohy's remarkable potential had fostered New York Times speculation on her future. Her high school coach, Brian Diglio, who was also her Advanced Placement U.S. History teacher, endeavored to keep Tuohy in check while guarding her progress. “My role so far has been to try to put the brakes on, so she doesn’t do too much,” he said. “She has an unbelievable work ethic; I’ve never seen anything like it." He feels her academic diligence is as important as her athletic accomplishments. She finished the 2017–18 school year with a 4.59 GPA.

=== 2019 ===
On January 26 in New York City (NYC), she broke Mary Cain's best high school indoor time of 9:02.10 with a time of 9:01.81, while finishing third in the 3000 meter against seven pros. That gave her four of the fastest eight ever indoor times by a high school girl for the distance. She competed in the New Balance Indoor Two Mile in NYC on March 10, and won with a time of 9:51.05, making her the second fastest ever U.S. high school girl, indoors or out. Consideration was given to have her competing exclusively in open competition, rather than in high school events. It was thought that experiencing stiffer competition from professional runners might be expected to benefit her regarding the possibility of Olympic Trials training to follow in 2020.

In her first major race of the season, Tuohy won the Great American Cross Country race in North Carolina, 13 seconds under the course record. On December 7, she became the first athlete, boy or girl, to become a three-time NXN champion, winning the race in 17:18.4. This was the closest margin of victory for not only Tuohy but in NXN history. After her last high school race, she underwent knee surgery.

== College ==
Tuohy entered NC State as a freshman in 2020. She missed most of the fall season with an injury, but she made her NCAA debut in February 2021 at the Camel City Invitational.

=== 2021 ===
In her first year at North Carolina State University, Katelyn raced once during the cross country season in the delayed 2020 NCAA Division I Cross Country Championships, placing 24th with a time of 20:41.3. She was the top freshman finisher in 2020 (the meet took place in March 2021) and the only freshman to achieve All-American status. NC State placed second. Tuohy bettered her 2020* performance by placing 15th at the 2021 NCAA Cross Country Championships with a time of 19:43.0. She helped NC State take home the team title and once again was selected as an All-American.

=== 2022 ===
Tuohy's 2022 1500 m and 5000 m best times ranked respectively as the eighth and seventh fastest ever for collegians. On June 11, she won the NCAA 5000 m outdoor title in 15:18.39. Two weeks after soundly beating 2020 NCAA XC Champ Mercy Chelangat at Notre Dame, Tuohy won Wisconsin's Nuttycombe 6K cross country invitational in 19:44.3, leading her NC State team to a tiebreaker win over the second ranked University of New Mexico Lobos. On October 28, she won the 2022 ACC Cross Country Championships with a new course record of 19:08 (for 6K) and helped her team win the team championship title. On November 19, at the NCAA Division I Cross Country Championships, Tuohy came from more than 11 seconds back to overtake Florida's Parker Valby at around the five kilometer mark, and ended up winning the women's individual championship. This also helped propel NC State to the 2022 women's team crown. Afterward, she signed an NIL deal with Adidas Running.

=== 2023 ===
Tuohy opened the 2023 season on January 28 by breaking the NCAA indoor mile record, finishing third to two professionals, in 4:24.26 at the Dr. Sander Invitational Columbia Challenge. She beat the previous record of 4:25.91 set by Jenny Simpson (then Barringer) in 2009. On February 11 at the Millrose Games in New York, she set a new NCAA indoor 3000 m record with a time of 8:35.20, to break Karissa Schweizer's previous collegiate best of 8:41.60.

In Tuohy's first race of the 2023 Cross country season, she finished second to Florida's Parker Valby at the Nuttycombe Invitational. At the 2023 NCAA Cross Country Championships she finished fifth with a time of 19:23 behind Parker Valby's winning time of 18:55.2. Tuohy's finish edged NC State to the 2023 DI women's cross country team title, finishing with 123 points, one in front of Northern Arizona University. The win gave the Wolfpack three straight titles, becoming the first program to complete a three-peat since Stanford (2005–07).

== Professional ==
On December 6, 2023, Tuohy announced that she had signed a professional contract with Adidas and would forgo her final track season at NC State.

Following time off due to injury, Tuohy competed at the 2024 Olympic Trials in the 5000 m where she ran 16:09.22 to qualify for the final. Later that same month she recorded her first win as a pro at a meet in Los Angeles.

In January 2025, she ran a 4:25:54 at the Dr. Sander invitational to set a record in the mile and in June won the 5K at the Portland Track Festival.

== Achievements ==
=== NCAA titles ===
- NCAA Division I Women's Outdoor Track and Field Championships
  - 5000 meters: 2022
- NCAA Division I Women's Indoor Track and Field Championships
  - 3000 meters: 2023
  - 5000 meters: 2023
- NCAA Women's Division I Cross Country Championship
  - 6 km XC: 2022

=== Collegiate achievements ===
- 1500 meters indoor – 4:06.49+ (New York, NY 2023) NCAA record
- Mile indoor – 4:24.26 (New York, NY 2023) NCAA record
- 3000 meters indoor – 8:35.20 (New York, NY 2023) NCAA record
- 3000 meters indoor U20 – 8:54.18 (Boston, MA 2021) NU20R
- 5000 meters: 15:03.12 (Walnut, CA 2023) NCAA record

=== High school achievements ===
High school national records:

- Mile – 4:33.87 (Greensboro, NC 2018)
- 3000 meters indoor – 9:01.81 (New York 2019)
- 3200 meters – 9:47.88 (White Plains, NY 2018)
- 5000 meters indoor – 15:37.12 (Lynchburg, VA 2018)

Nike Cross Nationals champion: 2017, 2018, 2019

== Honors and awards ==
- Gatorade Female Athlete of the Year: 2018
- Gatorade Female XC Athlete of the Year: 2018, 2019, 2020
- Gatorade Female Track Athlete of the Year: 2018
- Honda Sports Award: 2023 Cross country
- ACC Athlete of the Year (women): 2023

During her sophomore year in 2017–2018, Tuohy won both the Gatorade Female Cross Country Player of the Year award and the Gatorade Female Track & Field Player of the Year award, making her the first athlete ever to capture the award in two sports, then she won the overall Gatorade Female Athlete of the Year award. Her photo was on the cover of Sports Illustrated that summer.

In October 2018, she was honored as the Track and Field News High School Girls Athlete Of The Year. In 2019, she repeated as the Gatorade female cross country awardee for her undefeated 2018 season. Track and Field News named her as 2019's repeat "Indoor Girls Athlete of the Year". After winning the Nike Girls Cross Country Championships in Portland, Oregon, in 2019, she was again named the Gatorade Player of the Year, matching track star and future Olympian, Marion Jones as the only other such three-peat winner. The Gatorade award also factors in academic performance. In her originating high school district, the North Rockland Chamber of Commerce awarded Touhy with the first annual Student of the Year award.

After the end of the 2022–23 school year, Tuohy was named the women's ACC Athlete of the Year across all sports, sharing honors with men's winner Rhett Lowder of Wake Forest baseball.
