= List of United States high school national records in track and field =

The list of United States high-school national records in track and field is separated by indoor and outdoor and boys and girls who have set a national record in their respective events.

While these records have been compiled for over 100 years, there are varying standards for these records. The National Federation of State High School Associations (NFHS) compiles records based only upon competitions its state affiliates sanction. Those would be scholastic dual meets, high-school-only invitationals and championship meets up through the individual state championships.

Track and Field News (T&FN) has tracked records by any American high school students, in any competition until they enter college. These records include marks made in open competition against higher-level competitors, post-season meets and international competition up until August 31 following their high-school graduation.

Since there are no national championships in high-school competition, post-state-championship meets that proclaim such a position are not sanctioned by the NFHS and thus fall only under the T&FN guidelines.

Additionally, high-school competition is conducted under slightly different rules, which have evolved over time. For example, in 1980, high schools converted their running distances from Imperial (yards) to metric, but instead of running conventional international distances like 1500 metres in place of the mile run, a more equitable but non-standard 1600 meters was chosen. For the two-mile run, they run 3200 meters. For the long-hurdle race, they run 300 meters instead of the 400 metres hurdles. Some states ran over lower hurdle heights for a period of time. In field events, boys throw different weights of their implements than with international open division or the more comparable junior-division implements. Some states throw javelin or hammer, while the majority do not. Over time, this has resulted in statisticians collecting results and performing conversions as athletes have run different distances, jumped different hurdles and thrown different weights. Invitational meets have offered an assortment of legacy events and an array of relays, which allow each new generation of athlete a legitimate opportunity to compete in all these events, effectively keeping all records relevant and contemporary.

On this list, marks listed as the NFHS record with no other marks listed for that event, are the universally accepted record in the current official events.

== Outdoor ==
Key

NFHS record NFHS recognized record in legacy events Awaiting NFHS ratification Track and Field News record Awaiting Track and Field News publication, ratification not NFHS eligible or T&FN recognized event/mark

=== Boys ===
Event	Record	Athlete	High School Name	High School Location	Meet Location	Meet Name	Date	Ref.
100 y	9.30 (+0.9 m/s)	Houston McTear	Baker	Baker	Winter Park	FHSAA State Meet (prelim)	May 9, 1975	
100 m
100 m	9.92 (+1.1 m/s)	Tate Taylor	John Marshall Harlan	San Antonio	Austin	UIL State Championships	May 3, 2025	
100 m	9.92 (+1.8 m/s)	Maurice Gleaton	Langston Hughes	Fairburn	Eugene	USA Championships	August 1, 2025	
100 m	9.89 (+0.8 m/s) (Disqualified for doping)	Issamade Asinga	Montverde Academy	Montverde	São Paulo	South American Championships	July 28, 2023	
200 m	20.09 (+1.6 m/s)	Noah Lyles	T. C. Williams	Alexandria	Eugene	Olympic Trials	July 9, 2016	
200 m	20.13 (+1.7 m/s)	Roy Martin	Franklin D. Roosevelt	Dallas	Austin	UIL Texas State Meet	May 12, 1985	
200 m	19.97 (+1.3 m/s)	Issamade Asinga	Montverde Academy	Montverde	Lubbock	Corky/Crofoot Shootout	April 29, 2023	
220 yards	20.5	Dwayne Evans	South Mountain	Phoenix	Phoenix	Glendale Invitational	March 27, 1976	
220 yards straightaway	20.2 (+1.7 m/s)	Forrest Beaty	Hoover	Glendale	Ontario	CIF Southern Section Prelims	May 27, 1961	
400 m	44.10	Quincy Wilson	Bullis School	Potomac	Memphis	Ed Murphey Classic	July 12, 2025	
400 m	45.19	Aldrich Bailey	Mansfield Timberview	Arlington	Lubbock	Texas Class 5A Region I meet	April 28, 2012	
400 m	45.19	Michael Norman	Vista Murrieta	Murrieta	Clovis	CIF California State Meet	June 6, 2015	
440 yards	45.8	Ronnie Ray	Ferguson	Newport News	Charlottesville	Virginia State AAA	May 27, 1972	
800 m	1:42.27	Cooper Lutkenhaus	Northwest	Justin	Eugene	USA Championships	August 3, 2025	
800 m	1:46.45	Michael Granville	Bell Gardens	Bell Gardens	Sacramento	CIF California State Meet	June 2, 1996	
880 yards	1:48.8	Richard Joyce	Whittier Union	Whittier	Bakersfield	CIF California State Meet	June 5, 1965	
1000 m	2:21.81	Marcus Reilly	Northbridge	Whitinsville	Montreal	Montreal Track Classic	June 21, 2024	
1500 m	3:34.36	Hobbs Kessler	Skyline	Ann Arbor	Portland	Portland Track Festival	May 29, 2021	
1600 m	3:57.08	Drew Griffith	Butler	Butler	Shippensburg	PIAA Class 3A Championships	May 24, 2024	
1600 m	3:51.83 (Note: Webb was technically still in high school at the time, but NFHS only recognizes races against other high school competitors.)	Alan Webb	South Lakes	Reston	Eugene	Prefontaine Classic	May 27, 2001	
Mile	3:53.43	Alan Webb	South Lakes	Reston	Reston	Prefontaine Classic	May 27, 2001	
Mile	3:58.3*	Jim Ryun	Wichita East	Wichita	Wichita	Kansas State Championships	May 15, 1965	
2000 m	5:18.5+	Galen Rupp	Central Catholic	Portland	Richmond		June 23, 2004	
3000 m	7:58.66+ (Note: outdoor best; indoor mark ratified as absolute record)	Drew Griffith	Butler Area Senior	Butler	Renton	Brooks PR Invitational	June, 12 2024	
3200 m	8:31.80	Jackson Spencer	Herriman	Herriman	Arcadia	Arcadia Invitational	April 11, 2026	
3200 m	8:26.50+	Lukas Verzbicas	Carl Sandburg	Orland Hills	Eugene	Prefontaine Classic	June 4, 2011	
3200 m	8:31.73+	Simeon Birnbaum	Stevens	Rapid City	Seattle	Brooks PR Meet	June 14, 2023	
Two miles	8:29.46	Lukas Verzbicas	Carl Sandburg	Orland Hills	Eugene	Prefontaine Classic	June 4, 2011	
5000 m	13:25.86	Daniel Simmons	American Fork	American Fork	Portland	Portland Track Festival	June 9, 2024	
10,000 m	28:32.7	Rudy Chapa	Hammond	Hammond	Des Moines	Drake Relays	April 24, 1976	
Marathon	2:22:51	Timothy Synowiec	James M. Bennett	Salisbury	Salisbury	Salisbury Marathon	April 2, 2022	
120 yard hurdles (39")	12.9	Renaldo Nehemiah	Scotch Plains-Fanwood	Scotch Plains	Jamaica	Eastern States Outdoor	May 30, 1977	
110 m (39 in)	13.08	Wayne Davis	Southeast Raleigh	Raleigh	Port of Spain	Pan American Junior Championships	July 31, 2009	
110 m (39 in)	13.30	Chris Nelloms	Dunbar	Dayton	Dayton	Ohio State Meet- Division 1	May 26, 1990	
110 m (39 in)	13.1	Dennis Brantley	Worthing	Austin	Austin	Texas State Meet- Class AAAA	May 10, 1980	
110 m hurdles (42 in)	13.74 (−0.6 m/s)	Kevin Craddock	James Logan	Union City	Grosseto	World Junior Championships	July 17, 2004	
180 yard low hurdles	18.1	Steve Caminiti	Crespi	Encino	Camarillo	Camino Real Finals	May 9,1964	
180 yard low hurdles	18.1	Don Castronovo	Oceanside	Oceanside	Ithaca	NY State Finals	June 7,1964	
180 yard low hurdles	18.1	Earl McCullouch	Long Beach Polytechnic	Long Beach	Norwalk	CIF- Southern Section	May 29,1964	
300 m hurdles	34.83	Vance Nilsson	Gilbert	Gilbert	Mesa	AIA State Championships	May 11, 2024	
300 m hurdles	34.72	Andrew Jones	Klein Collins	Spring	Tomball	UIL 6A Area Championships	17 April 2026	
400 m hurdles	49.38	Kenneth Fergusson	Mumford	Detroit	Kingston	World Junior Championships	July 19, 2002	
400 m hurdles	49.20	Kennen Davis	Archbishop Carroll High School	Washington, D.C.	Eugene	USATF U20 Outdoor Championships	June 19, 2026	
2000 m steeplechase	5:40.71 (Note: by T&FN source; 5:40.72 by other sources)	Nathan Mountain	St. Xavier	Cincinnati	Cincinnati	Cicada Classic 2021	June 16, 2021	
2000 m steeplechase	5:37.60	Nicholas Mazzeo	Lower Merion	Ardmore	Philadelphia	New Balance Nationals Outdoor	June 20, 2026	
3000 m steeplechase
3000 m steeplechase	8:47.04	Bailey Roth	Coronado	Colorado Springs	Eugene	World Junior Championships	July 27, 2014	
High jump	2.31 m (7 ft 7 in)	Andra Manson	Brenham	Brenham	Kingston	World Junior Championships	July 18, 2002	
High jump	7 ft 6 in (2.28 m)	Vernon Turner	Yukon	Yukon	Yukon	Yukon Classic	April 14, 2017	
Pole vault
Pole vault	5.93 m (19 ft 5 1/4 in)	Armand Duplantis	Lafayette	Lafayette	Baton Rouge	LHSAA 5A State Championships	May 5, 2018	
Pole vault	6.05 m (19 ft 10 in)	Armand Duplantis	Lafayette	Lafayette	Berlin	European Championships	August 12, 2018	
Long jump	8.18 m (26 ft 10 in)	Marquise Goodwin	Rowlett	Rowlett	Eugene	USA Championships	June 27, 2009	
Long jump	8.04 m (26 ft 5 in)	James Stallworth	Tulare Union	Tulare	Norwalk	CIF California State Meet	June 3, 1989	
Triple jump	16.72 m (54 ft 10 in)	Kenny Hall	Tara	Baton Rouge	Eugene	USATF National Junior Olympic Championships	July 29, 2004	
Triple jump	16.11 m (52 ft 10 in)	Charles Mayfield	Muir	Pasadena	Arcadia	Arcadia Invitational	April 6, 1980	
Shot put (12 lb or 5.4 kg)	24.77 m (81 ft 3 in)	Michael Carter	Jefferson	Dallas	Sacramento	Golden West Invitational	June 16, 1979	
Shot put (12 lb or 5.4 kg)	23.46 m (77 ft 0 in)	Michael Carter	Jefferson	Dallas	Abilene	Abilene Christian All- Comers	May 5,1979	
Shot put (Junior) (6 kg or 13 lb)	22.02 m (72 ft 3 in)	Jordan Geist	Knoch	Saxonburg	Trujillo	Pan American U20 Athletics Championships	July 23, 2017	
Shot put (int'l) (16 lb or 7.3 kg)	20.65 m (67 ft 9 in)	Michael Carter	Jefferson	Dallas	Boston	USA vs USSR Juniors	July 4, 1979	
Discus throw (1.6 kg or 3.5 lb)	72.07 m (236 ft 5 in) A	Mason Finley	Buena Vista	Buena Vista	Alamosa	High Altitude Challenge	April 25, 2009	
Discus throw (1.6 kg or 3.5 lb)	72.40 m (237 ft 6 in)	Ryan Crouser	Sam Barlow	Gresham	Portland	Summer Open	June 9, 2011	
Discus throw (Jr) (1.75 kg or 3.9 lb)	62.26 m (204 ft 3 in)	Mason Finley	Buena Vista	Buena Vista	Eugene	USATF Junior Championships	June 27, 2009	
Discus throw (Jr) (1.75 kg or 3.9 lb)	65.34 m (214 ft 4 1/4 in)	Mason Finley	Buena Vista	Buena Vista	Port of Spain	Pan American Junior Championships	July 31, 2009	
Discus throw (int'l) (2 kg or 4.4 lb)	61.38 m (201 ft 5 in)	Gregg Hart	Homestead	Fort Wayne	Indianapolis	Indy Twilight	July 18, 1990	
Hammer throw (12 Lb.)	260 ft 5 in (79.38 m)	Rudy Winkler	Averill Park	Averill Park	West Point	Army Strong Hammer Meet	July 2, 2013	
Hammer throw (int'l/Sr)	219 ft 7 in (66.92 m)	Conor McCullough	Chaminade	West Hills	Chula Vista		July 22, 2009	
Javelin throw	255 ft 4 in (77.83 m)	Sam Crouser	Gresham	Gresham	Portland	Portland Rose Festival	June 12, 2010	
Javelin throw	246 ft 9 in (75.21 m)	Bill Stanley	South Park	South Park	Shippensburg	PIAA Pennsylvania State Championships	May 26, 2012	
Decathlon (HS/Jr)	8,035 points A	Gunnar Nixon	Santa Fe	Edmond	Albuquerque	Great Southwest Classic	June 2–3, 2011	
Decathlon (HS/Jr)		10.89 (+1.9 m/s), 7.45/24-5.50 (+2.3 m/s), 15.21/49-11, 2.15/7-0.5, 49.66 [4,384 points] 14.16 (+0.3 m/s), 43.32/142-1, 4.55/14-11, 53.46/175-5, 5:01.74 [3,651 points]						
Decathlon (int'l)	7,359 points	Craig Brigham	South Eugene	Eugene	Eugene	Oregon Invitational	March 31- April 1, 1972	
Decathlon (int'l)		10.9, 6.73/22-1, 14.18/46-61/4, 1.93/6-4, 52.3 [3,765 points] 15.5, 44.16/144-10, 4.43/14-61/2, 60.22/197-7, 4:53.0 [3,894 points]						
4 × 100 m relay	39.76	Wyatt		Fort Worth	Austin	TUIL state track meet	May 15, 1998	
4 × 100 m relay		Milton Wesley, Monte Clopton, Michael Franklin, DeMario Wesley						
4 × 100 m relay	38.92	Atascocita	Rice University	Humble	Houston	Victor Lopez Classic	March 23, 2024	
4 × 100 m relay		Tory Blaylock, Landon Fontenot, Jordan Parker, Jelani Watkins						
4×110 y relay	40.2	Lincoln		Dallas	Austin	Texas State Meet- Class AAAA	May 9, 1970	John Delley, Joe Pouncy, Rufus Shaw, Gene Pouncy
4 × 200 m relay	1:22.25	Duncanville		Duncanville	Austin	TUIL state track meet	May 4, 2024	
4 × 200 m relay		Brayden Williams, Caden Durham, Ayson Theus, Dakorien Moore						
4 × 400 m relay	3:07.40	Hawthorne		Hawthorne	Austin	Texas Relays	April 6, 1985	
4 × 400 m relay		Michael Graham 48.1, Mike Marsh 47.7, Sean Kelly 47.1, Henry Thomas 44.5						
4×440 y relay	3:10.37	Centennial		Compton	Berkeley	CIF California State Meet	June 7, 1980	
4×440 y relay		Leonard Graham 47.5, Tim Ware 48.1, Rufus Jackson 48.1, Michael Turner 46.7						
4 × 800 m relay	7:26.12	Herriman		Herriman	Philadelphia	New Balance Nationals	June 21, 2025	
4 × 800 m relay		Jonah Tang (1:54.74), Micah Tang (1:52.52), Tayshaun Ogomo (1:48.94), Jackson Spencer (1:49.94)						
4 × 800 m relay	7:33.48	Central Bucks		Warrington	Shippensburg	PIAA Pennsylvania State Championships	May 25, 2009	
4 × 800 m relay		Jeff Dickson 1:55.4, Dave Manion 1:55.5, Matt Poiesz 1:53.2, Tom Mallon 1:49.0						
4 × 1500 m relay	16:03.7	South Eugene		Eugene	Eugene		April 30, 1982	
4 × 1500 m relay		Eric Mason 4:05.6, John Chambers 4:05.1, Will Kimball 3:58.5, Matt McGuirk 3:54.5						
4×1600 m relay	16:41.30	American Fork		American Fork	Arcadia	Arcadia Invitational	April 7, 2017	
4×1600 m relay		Carson Clinger (4:25.50), Mckay Johns (4:08.23), Patrick Parker (4:05.57), Casey Clinger (4:02.16)						
4×Mile	17:04.55 (Note: outdoor best; indoor mark ratified as absolute record)	Ogden		Ogden	Greensboro		June 19, 2016	
	Christian Warren (4:16.06), Garrett Barton (4:16.44), Travis Feeny (4:21.13), Alex Parson (4:10.94)							
Swedish relay (100, 200, 300, 400)	1:52.39	Parkview		Lilburn	Greensboro	National Scholastic Championships	June 16, 2017	
Swedish relay (100, 200, 300, 400)		Malik Washington, Demarius Smith, Amir Harris, Justin Long (46.60)						
Sprint Medley (200, 200, 400, 800)	3:19.58	New Bern High School		New Bern	Raleigh		March 27, 2009	
Sprint Medley (200, 200, 400, 800)		Fuquawn Greene 21.5, Miles Sparks 21.8, Andrew Hendrix 46.6, Anthony Hendrix 1:49.7						
Distance Medley (1200, 400, 800, 1600)	9:44.30	Crater		Central Point	Philadelphia	New Balance Nationals	June 16, 2024	
Distance Medley (1200, 400, 800, 1600)		Tayvon Kitchen 3:00.02, Nicholas Kube 49.49, Caleb Doddington 1:52.75, Josiah Tostenson 4:02.04						
4 × 110m Hurdles Relay	56.32	Westside		Anderson	Willingboro		May 17, 2004	
4 × 110m Hurdles Relay		Dennis Martin 13.9, Brandon Brown 13.8, Martez Brown 14.2, Mauricus Brown 14.4						

=== Girls ===
Event	Record	Athlete	High School Name	High School Location	Meet Location	Meet Name	Date	Ref.
100 y	10.3	Chandra Cheeseborough	Ribault High School	Jacksonville, Florida			1977	
100 m	10.89 (+0.9 m/s)	Shawnti Jackson	South Granville High School	Creedmoor, North Carolina	Nashville, Tennessee	Music City Track Carnival	June 3, 2023	
100 m	11.00 (+1.5 m/s)	Mia Brahe-Pedersen	Lake Oswego High School	Lake Oswego, Oregon	Eugene, Oregon	Oregon OSAA State Championships	May 27, 2023	
200 m	22.11 A (−0.5 m/s)	Allyson Felix	Los Angeles Baptist High School	North Hills, California	Mexico City, Mexico	Banamex Grand Prix	May 3, 2003	
200 m Low Altitude
200 m Low Altitude	22.43 (−0.7 m/s)	Candace Hill	Rockdale High School	Rockdale, Texas	Cali, Colombia	World Youth Championships	July 19, 2015	
200 m	22.52 (+0.8 m/s)	Allyson Felix	Los Angeles Baptist High School	North Hills, California	Norwalk, California	CIF California State Meet	June 7, 2003	
220 yards	23.3	Chandra Cheeseborough	Ribault High School	Jacksonville, Florida			1977	
400 m	50.69	Sanya Richards	Aquinas High School	Ft. Lauderdale, Florida	Stanford, California	USA Championships	June 22, 2002	
400 m	50.74	Monique Henderson	Morse High School	San Diego, California	Norwalk, California	CIF California State Meet	June 3, 2000	
440 yards	53.65	Sherri Howard	San Gorgonio High School	San Bernardino, California	Sacramento, California	CIF California State Meet	June 2, 1979	
600 m	1:25.22	Sophia Gorriaran	Moses Brown School	Providence, Rhode Island	Philadelphia, Pennsylvania	Penn Relays	30 April 2022	
800 m	1:59.04	Juliette Whittaker	Mount de Sales Academy	Catonsville, Maryland	Eugene, Oregon	USA Championships	June 25, 2022	
800 m	2:00.03	Roisin Willis	Stevens Point Area School	Stevens Point, Wisconsin	La Crosse, Wisconsin	WIAA State High School Championship	3 June 2022	
1000 m	2:35.80	Mary Cain	Bronxville High School	Bronxville, New York	Boston, Mass	New Balance Grand Prix	February 8, 2014	
1500 m	4:04.62	Mary Cain	Bronxville High School	Bronxville, New York	Eagle Rock, California	Oxy High Performance Distance Classic	May 17, 2013	
1500 m	4:03.39	Alexa Efraimson	Camas High School	Camas, Washington	Eugene, Oregon	Prefontaine Classic	May 30, 2015	
1600 m	4:29.86+	Sadie Engelhardt	Ventura High School	Ventura, California	Walnut, California	Mt. SAC Relays	19 April 2024	
1600 m	4:26.16	Addy Wiley	Huntington North High School	Huntington, Indiana	Allendale, Michigan	GVSU Midwest Redemption Meet	June 11, 2022	
1600 m	4:21.81+	Jane Hedengren	Timpview High School	Provo, Utah	St. Louis, Missouri	HOKA Festival of Miles	June 5, 2025	
Mile	4:23.50	Jane Hedengren	Timpview High School	Provo, Utah	St. Louis, Missouri	HOKA Festival of Miles	June 5, 2025	
3000 m	8:40.03	Jane Hedengren	Timpview High School	Provo, Utah	Eugene, Oregon	Nike Outdoor Nationals	June 21, 2025	
3200 m
3200 m	9:30.68+	Jane Hedengren	Timpview High School	Provo, Utah	Arcadia, California	Arcadia Invitational	April 12, 2025	
3200 m	9:14.65+	Jane Hedengren	Timpview High School	Provo, Utah	Renton, Washington	Brooks PR Invitational	June 8, 2025	
Two miles	9:17.75	Jane Hedengren	Timpview High School	Provo, Utah	Renton, Washington	Brooks PR Invitational	June 8, 2025	
5000 m	14:57.93	Jane Hedengren	Timpview High School	Provo, Utah	Azusa, California	Bryan Clay Invitational	April 17, 2025	
10,000 m	32:52.5	Mary Shea	Gibbons High School	Raleigh, North Carolina	Walnut, California	USA Outdoor Track and Field Championships	June 15, 1979	
Marathon	2:34:24	Cathy Schiro (O'Brien)	Dover High School	Dover, New Hampshire	Olympia, Washington	Olympic Trials	May 12, 1984	
100 m hurdles	12.84 (+1.2 m/s)	Tia Jones	George Walton Comp High School	Marietta, Georgia	Clovis, California	USATF Junior National Outdoor Track and Field Championships	June 25, 2016	
100 m hurdles	13.03 (+2.0 m/s)	Vashti Thomas	Mt. Pleasant High School	San Jose, California	Sacramento, California	CIF California State Meet	June 2, 2007	
100 m hurdles	13.01 (+1.0 m/s)	Tara Davis	Agoura High School	Agoura, California	Arcadia, California	Arcadia Invitational	April 8, 2017	
300 m hurdles	39.98	Lashinda Demus	Wilson High School	Long Beach, California	Norwalk, California	CIF Southern Section Div 1 Finals	May 19, 2001	
300 m hurdles	38.90	Sydney McLaughlin	Union Catholic High School	Scotch Plains, New Jersey	Arcadia, United States	Arcadia Invitational	April 8, 2017	
400 m hurdles	53.82	Sydney McLaughlin	Union Catholic High School	Scotch Plains, New Jersey	Sacramento, California	USA Championships	June 25, 2017	
2000 m steeplechase	6:18.41	Angelina Napoleon	Allegany-Limestone High School	Allegany, New York	Middletown, New York	NYSPHSAA state meet	10 June 2023	
3000 m steeplechase	10:00.72	Brianna Nerud	North Shore High School	Glen Head, New York	Barcelona, Spain	World Junior Championships	July 12, 2012	
High jump	6 ft 4 1/2 in (1.94 m)	Vashti Cunningham	Bishop Gorman High School	Las Vegas, Nevada	Walnut, California	Mt. SAC Relays	April 18, 2015	
Pole vault
Pole vault	4.57 m (14 ft 11 3/4 in)	Hana Moll	Capital High School	Olympia, Washington	Arcadia, California	Arcadia Invitational	3 April 2023 (Note: by NFHS source; 8 April 2023 by other sources)	
Pole vault	4.65 m (15 ft 3 in)	Hana Moll	Capital High School; Team USA	Olympia, Washington	Budapest, Hungary	World Championships	August 21, 2023	
Long jump	6.86 m (22 ft 6 in) (±0.0 m/s)	Kate Hall	Lake Region High School	Naples, Maine	Greensboro, North Carolina	Nike Outdoor Nationals	June 21, 2015	
Long jump	6.75 m (22' 1 3/5")	Kathy McMillan	Hoke County High School	Raeford, North Carolina	Knoxville, Tennessee	Volunteer Track and Field Classic	April 24, 1976	
Long jump	6.81 m (22 ft 4 in)	Sophia Beckmon	Oregon City High School	Oregon City, Oregon	Beaverton, Oregon	Nike/Jesuit Twilight Relays	April 28, 2023	
Triple jump	13.71 m (44' 11 3/4")	Brittany Daniels	Merrill F. West High School	Tracy, California	College Station, Texas	USATF Junior Track & Field Championships	June 27, 2004	
Triple jump	13.46 m (44' 2 1/4")	Ychlindria Spears	Luling High School	Luling, Texas	Austin, Texas	TUIL state track meet	May 11, 2001	
Shot put	17.27 m (56' 8 ¼")	Raven Saunders	Burke High School	Charleston, South Carolina	Columbia, South Carolina	Taco Bell Track & Field Classic	April 12, 2014	
Shot put	57 ft 1 1/4 in (17.4 m)	Alyssa Wilson	Donovan Catholic High School	Toms River, New Jersey	Jackson, New Jersey	Ocean County Championships	May 15, 2017	
Discus throw (1 kg)	60.59 m (198' 9")	Shelbi Vaughan	Mansfield Legacy High School	Mansfield, Texas	Bloomington, Indiana	USA Junior Championships	June 26, 2012	
Discus throw (1 kg)	193 ft 8 1/4 in (59.03 m)	Emma Sralla	Edward S. Marcus High School	Flower Mound, Texas	Dallas, Texas	Sheaner Relays	March 25, 2023	
Hammer throw	65.32 m (214' 3")	Shelby Ashe	St. Pius High School	Atlanta, Georgia	Marietta, Georgia	USATF Georgia Association Junior Championships	June 15, 2010	
Weight throw	21.13 m (69' 4")	Shelby Ashe	St. Pius High School	Atlanta, Georgia	New York, New York			
Javelin throw	182 ft 8 in (55.67 m)	Madison Wiltrout	Connellsville Area Senior High School	Connellsville, Pennsylvania	Shippensburg, Pennsylvania	PIAA Track & Field Championships	May 22, 2015	
Heptathlon	5660 pts	Anna Hall	Valor Christian High School	Highlands Ranch, Colorado	Bloomington, Indiana	USA U20 Championships	June 16–17, 2018	
Heptathlon	100m H (wind) / High jump / Shot put / 200m (wind) / Long jump (wind) / Javelin / 800m; 14.10 (+0.2 m/s) / 1.82m (5' 11.5") / 11.04m (36' 2.75") / 24.54 (−1.1 m/s) / 5.68m (18' 7.5") (+0.1 m/s) / 34.24m (112' 4) / 2:17.65							
Heptathlon	5829 pts A (Note: Hall’s official score with a wind-over-the-limit long jump of 5.55/18-2½ (+5.1 m/s)was a non-ratifiable 5847)	Anna Hall	Valor Christian High School	Highlands Ranch, Colorado	San José, Costa Rica	Pan American U20 Championships	July 20–21, 2019	
Heptathlon	100m H (wind) / High jump / Shot put / 200m (wind) / Long jump (wind) / Javelin / 800m; 14.11 (−0.7 m/s) / 1.82 m (5-11½) / 12.53 m (41-1½) / 24.22 (+1.9 m/s) / 5.49 m (18-¼) (−1.6 m/s) / 33.70 m (110‑7) / 2:10.11							
4 × 100 m relay	44.24	DeSoto High School		DeSoto, Texas	Austin, Texas	U.I.L State Championship	May 11, 2019	
4 × 100 m relay		JaEra Griffin, Jayla Hollis, Taylor Armstrong, Rosaline Effiong						
4 × 110 y relay	46.14	Crawford High School		San Diego, California	Westwood, Los Angeles, California	CIF California State Meet	June 4, 1977	
		Danita Young, Judy Reed, Jewel Lovelady, Katie Gaston						
4 × 200 m relay	1:33.43	Aquinas High School		Ft. Lauderdale, Florida	Gainesville, Florida	Florida Relays	April 4, 2014	
4 × 200 m relay		Krystal Sparling, Diamond Spaulding, Narinah Jean-Baptiste, Kendall Ellis						
4 × 200 m relay	1:33.87	Long Beach Polytechnic High School		Long Beach, California	Arcadia, California	Arcadia Invitational	April 9, 2004	
4 × 200 m relay		Shana Solomon 24.2, Jasmine Lee 23.3, Shana Woods 23.4, Shalonda Solomon 23.0						
4 × 400 m relay	3:35.49	Long Beach Polytechnic High School		Long Beach, California	Sacramento, California	CIF California State Meet	June 5, 2004	
4 × 400 m relay		Shana Woods 55.7, DeShanta Harris 55.6, Jasmine Lee 52.6, Shalonda Solomon 51.6						
4 × 440	3:44.89	San Gorgonio High School		San Bernardino, California	Sacramento, California	CIF California State Meet	June 2, 1979	
4 × 440		Atra Howard (senior) 58.4, Tina Howard (sophomore) 58.1, Denean Howard (freshman) 53.9, Sherri Howard (junior) 53.7						
4 × 800 m relay	8:48.29	Grosse Pointe South High School		Grosse Pointe Farms, Michigan	Kentwood, Michigan	MHSAA Division I State Meet	June 2, 2012	
4 × 800 m relay		Kelsie Schwartz 2:13.0, Ersula Farrow 2:13.4, Haley Meier 2:13.3 and Hannah Meier 2:08.2						
4 × 800 m relay	8:43.12	Roosevelt High School		Greenbelt, Maryland	Philadelphia, Pennsylvania	Penn Relays	April 25, 2008	
4 × 800 m relay		Dominique Lockhart 2:13.0, Amirah Johnson 2:08.6, Brittany Ogunomokun 2:11.9, Tasha Stanley 2:09.6						
4 × 1500 m relay	18:42.33	South Eugene High School		South Eugene, Oregon	Portland, Oregon	Portland Track Festival	June 10, 2012	
4 × 1500 m relay		Erin Clark 4:31.4, Phacelia Cramer 4:56.3, Paige Kouba 4:37.5, Sara Tsai 4:38.7						
4 × Mile relay	19:56.75	Suffern High School		Suffern, New York	New Rochelle, New York		June 4, 2006	
4 × Mile relay		Christy Goldman 5:08.7, Shelby Greany 5:01.8, Caroline Heidt 4:52.3, Kara McKenna 4:53.9						
Sprint medley relay (100, 100, 200, 400)	1:38.73	Long Beach Polytechnic High School		Long Beach, California	Arcadia, California	Arcadia Invitational	April 11, 2003	
Sprint medley relay (100, 100, 200, 400)		Shana Solomon, Dominique Dorsey, Jasmine Lee, Shalonda Solomon 51.4						
Sprint medley relay (200, 200, 400, 800)	3:47.35	Union Catholic Regional High School		Scotch Plains, New Jersey	Arcadia, California	Arcadia Invitational	April 10, 2026	
Sprint medley relay (200, 200, 400, 800)		Sydney Chadwick, Abriyah Thompson, Abigail Robisky (53.83), Paige Sheppard (2:04.08)						
Distance medley relay (1200, 400, 800, 1600)	11:21.85	Ventura High School		Ventura, California	Walnut, California	Mt. SAC Relays	April 20, 2024	
Distance medley relay (1200, 400, 800, 1600)		Melanie True 3:36.38, Valentina Fakrogha 54.73, Aelo Curtis 2:16.18, Sadie Engelhardt 4:33.95						
4 × 100 m Hurdles relay (33")	54.67	Western Branch High School		Chesapeake, Virginia	Greensboro, North Carolina	National Scholastic Championships	June 16, 2018	
4 × 100 m Hurdles relay (33")		Shadajah Ballard, Jazmine Tilmon, Adriana Shockley, Na’tajah Ballard						

== Indoor ==
Key

NFHS record NFHS recognized record in legacy events Awaiting NFHS ratification Track and Field News record Awaiting Track and Field News publication, ratification not NFHS eligible or T&FN recognized event/mark

=== Boys ===
Event	Record	Athlete	High School Name	High School Location	Meet Location	Meet Name	Date	Ref.
50 m	5.69	Bryan Howard	Canyon Springs	Moreno Valley, California	Los Angeles, California	Sunkist Invitational	February 19, 1994	
55 m	6.08	Marvin Bracy	William R. Boone	Orlando, Florida	Gainesville, Florida	Jimmy Carnes Indoor	January 29, 2012	
60 m	6.57	Casey Combest	Owensboro High School	Owensboro, Kentucky	Columbus, Ohio		March 14, 1999	
60 m	6.57	Issam Asinga	Montverde Academy	Montverde, Florida	Boston	New Balance Nationals	March 11, 2023	
200 m	20.46	Tate Taylor	Harlan High School	San Antonio, Texas	New York	Nike Indoor Nationals	March 16, 2025	
300 m	32.64	Brian Herron	Lakeside High School	Atlanta, Georgia	Lynchburg, Virginia		January 19, 2018	
300 m	32.64	Jayden Horton-Mims	Imhotep Institute Charter High School	Philadelphia, Pennsylvania	New York City	Millrose Games	February 8, 2025	
400 m	45.76	Quincy Wilson	Bullis High School	Potomac, Maryland	Boston	New Balance Nationals	March 10, 2024	
400 m	45.66	Quincy Wilson	Bullis High School	Potomac, Maryland	Boston	New Balance Grand Prix	February 2, 2025	
500 m	1:01.25	Will Sumner	Woodstock High School	Woodstock, Georgia	Virginia Beach, Virginia	The Virginia Showcase	January 15, 2022	
500 m	1:00.49	Andrew Salvodon	Bayside High School	Virginia Beach, Virginia	Virginia Beach, Virginia	The Virginia Showcase	January 17, 2025	
600 m	1:15.58	Will Sumner	Woodstock High School	Woodstock, Georgia	Chicago, Illinois	CYUP Misfits Invitational	January 22, 2022	
800 m	1:47.67	Josh Hoey	Bishop Shanahan High School	Downingtown, Pennsylvania	Boston	BU Last Chance Meet	February 25, 2018	
800 m	1:46.86	Cooper Lutkenhaus	Northwest High School	Justin, Texas	New York City	Millrose Games	February 8, 2025	
1000 m	2:22.28	Robby Andrews	Manalapan High School	Manalapan, New Jersey	New York City	New Balance Collegiate Invitational	February 6, 2009	
1000 m	2:20.14	Cole Boone	Pulaski County High School	Dublin, Virginia	Lynchburg	VHSL Class 3 Indoor Track State Championships	March 4, 2025	
1500 m	3:41.93	Drew Hunter	Loudoun Valley High School	Purcellville, Virginia	New York City		February 20, 2016	
Mile	3:57.66	Hobbs Kessler	Skyline High School	Ann Arbor, Michigan	Fayetteville	American Track League #3	7 February 2021	
Mile	3:56.66	Owen Powell	Mercer Island High School	Mercer Island, Washington	Boston	Terrier DMR Challenge	21 February 2025	
2000 m	5:17.89+	Nico Young	Newbury Park High School	Newbury Park, California	New York City	Millrose Games	February 8, 2020	
2000 m	5:12.79	Jameson Pifer	Collins Hill High School	Suwanee, Georgia	Winston-Salem	ASICS Sound Invite	February 14, 2026	
3000 m	7:56.97	Nico Young	Newbury Park High School	Newbury Park, California	New York City	Millrose Games	February 8, 2020	
Two miles	8:34.91	Drew Griffith	Butler Area Senior High School	Butler, Pennsylvania	Boston	New Balance Nationals	March 10, 2024	
5000 m	13:38.86	Daniel Simmons	American Fork High School	American Fork, Utah	Boston	New Balance Nationals	March 9, 2024	
50 m hurdles (99/100 cm)	6.62	Johnny Dutch	Clayton High School	Clayton, North Carolina			March 11, 2007	
50 m hurdles (107/100 cm)	6.76	Rod Wilson	Bartram High School	Philadelphia, Pennsylvania	Winnipeg, Manitoba Canada		February 17, 1979	
55 m hurdles (99/100 cm)	6.88	Trey Cunningham	Winfield High School	Winfield, Alabama	Fort Washington Avenue Armory	Nike Indoor Nationals	March 12, 2017	
55 m hurdles (107/100 cm)	7.30	Josh Hembrough	Northern High School	Forest Hills, Michigan	Allendale, Michigan		January 12, 2007	
60 m hurdles (99/100 cm)	7.40	Trey Cunningham	Winfield High School	Winfield, Alabama	Fort Washington Avenue Armory	Nike Indoor Nationals	March 12, 2017	
60 m hurdles (107/100 cm)	7.85	Josh Hembrough	Northern High School	Forest Hills, Michigan	Clemson, South Carolina		December 1, 2006	
Mile walk	6:03.48	Trevor Barron	Bethel Park High School	Pittsburgh, Pennsylvania	New York City		January 29, 2010	
High jump	2.27 m (7 ft 5 1/4 in)	Scott Sellars	Cinco Ranch High School	Katy	Landover, Maryland		March 13, 2004	
Pole vault	5.88 m (19 ft 3 1/4 in)	Armand Duplantis	Lafayette High School	Lafayette, Louisiana	Clermont-FerrandFrance		February 25, 2018	
Long jump	8.09 m (26 ft 6 1/2 in)	Dion Bentley	Penn Hills High School	Pittsburgh, Pennsylvania	University Park, Pennsylvania		February 18, 1989	
Triple jump	16.04 m (52 ft 7 1/4 in)	Keith Holley	Bayside High School	Virginia Beach	New Haven, Connecticut		March 13, 1988	
Shot put (Jr) (6 kg or 13.2 lb)	21.89 m (71 ft 9 3/4 in)	Jordan Geist	Knoch High School	Saxonburg, Pennsylvania	Greensburg, Pennsylvania		February 7, 2017	
Shot put (int'l) (16 lb or 7.3 kg)	20.82 m (68 ft 3 1/2 in)	Jordan Geist	Knoch High School	Saxonburg, Pennsylvania	Greensburg, Pennsylvania		December 22, 2016	
Weight throw (25 lb or 11.3 kg)	28.43 m (93 ft 3 1/4 in)	Conor McCullough	Chaminade High School	West Hills, California	Fort Washington Avenue Armory	Nike Indoor Nationals	March 15, 2009	
Weight throw (32 lb or 14.5 kg)	20.02 m (65 ft 8 in)	Davis Fraker	McIntosh High School	Peachtree City, Georgia	Spartanburg, South Carolina		February 14, 2010	
Pentathlon	4307	Gunnar Nixon	Santa Fe High School	Edmond, Oklahoma	Fort Washington Avenue Armory	Nike Indoor Nationals	March 12, 2011	
Pentathlon	60m H / Long jump / Shot put / High jump / 1000m; 8.03 / 23 ft 6 3/4 in (7.18 m) / 47 ft 11 3/4 in (14.62 m) / 6 ft 6 3/4 in (2 m) / 2:37.00							
4 × 200 m relay	1:25.60	Ashton Allen; Austin Allen; Andre Turay; Ryan Willie	Bullis School	Potomac, Maryland	Liberty University	MileSplit VA Showcase	January 19, 2019	
4 × 400 m relay	3:11.87	Alexander Lambert 48.50; Julian Roberson 47.98; Colin Abrams 48.52; Quincy Wilson 46.87	Bullis School	Potomac, Maryland	Boston	New Balance Nationals	March 10, 2024	
4 × 800 m relay	7:36.99	Zack Vrhovac 1:53.4; Luke Noble 1:54.9; Garrett Bradley 1:57.3; Anthony Kostelac 1:51.4	Albemarle High School	Charlottesville, Virginia	Boston		March 15, 2009	
4 × Mile relay	16:29.31	Aaron Sahlman (4:11.37); Leo Young (4:06.86); Lex Young (4:07.34); Colin Sahlman (4:03.74)	Newbury Park High School	Newbury Park, California	Fort Washington Avenue Armory	New Balance Nationals	March 12, 2022	
Sprint medley relay	3:23.86	Matthew Goines; Cameron Homer; Quincy Wilson (46.66); Colin Abrams (1:53.03)	Bullis School	Potomac, Maryland	Virginia Beach, Virginia	VA Showcase	13 January 2024	
Distance medley relay	9:53.40	Andrew McCabe (3:03.32); Patrick Doran (51.42); James Kisker (1:54.96); Jackson Barna (4:03.71)	Ridge High School	Basking Ridge, New Jersey	Fort Washington Avenue Armory	New Balance Nationals	March 11, 2022	
Distance medley relay	9:47.01	Armando Cruz (3:00.02); Carlos Benitez (50.78); Jack Michalak (1:51.49); Marcelo Mantecon (4:04.73)	Belen Jesuit Preparatory School	Miami, Florida	Fort Washington Avenue Armory	Nike Indoor Nationals	March 14, 2026	
4 x 55 meters hurdles relay	28.62	Akeem Lindo; Cory Poole; Altraiq Dunson; Ibrahim Fobay	East Orange High School	East Orange, New Jersey	Fort Washington Avenue Armory	Nike Indoor Nationals	March 11, 2017	

=== Girls ===
Event	Record	Athlete	High School Name	High School Location	Meet Location	Meet Name	Date	Ref.
50 m	6.24+	Adaejah Hodge	Montverde Academy	Montverde, Florida	Virginia Beach, Virginia	VA Showcase	12 January 2024	
55 m	6.67+	Shawnti Jackson	Wakefield High School	Raleigh, North Carolina	Fort Washington Avenue Armory	Millrose Games	29 January 2022	
55 m	6.67+	Shawnti Jackson	South Granville High School	Creedmoor, North Carolina	Fort Washington Avenue Armory	Millrose Games	11 February 2023	
60 m	7.16	Shawnti Jackson	South Granville High School	Creedmoor, North Carolina	Fort Washington Avenue Armory	Millrose Games	11 February 2023	
200 m	22.33	Adaejah Hodge	Montverde Academy	Montverde, Florida	Boston	New Balance Nationals	12 March 2023	
300 m	36.30	Elise Cooper	McDonogh High School	Owings Mills, Maryland	Philadelphia, Pennsylvania	The CIRCUIT	28 February 2025	
400 m	51.61	Sydney McLaughlin	Scotch Plains-Fanwood	Union County, New Jersey	Fort Washington Avenue Armory	Artie O'Connor Invitational	March 11, 2017	
500 m	1:10.22	Athing Mu	Trenton Central High School	Trenton, New Jersey	Lynchburg, Virginia	Virginia Showcase	17 January 2020	
600 m	1:23.57	Athing Mu	Trenton Central High School	Trenton, New Jersey	Staten Island	USA Championships	February 24, 2019	
800 m	2:00.06	Roisin Willis	Stevens Point Area Senior High School	Stevens Point, Wisconsin	Boston University Track and Tennis Center	David Hemery Valentine Invitational	11 February 2022	
1000 m	2:39.41	Juliette Whittaker	Mount de Sales Academy	Macon, Georgia	Staten Island	Ocean Breeze Elite Invitational	26 February 2022	
1500 m	4:11.72	Mary Cain	Bronxville High School	Bronxville, New York	Fort Washington Avenue Armory	Millrose Games	February 19, 2013	
Mile	4:26.14	Jane Hedengren	Timpview High School	Provo, Utah	Fort Washington Avenue Armory	Nike Indoor Nationals	March 16, 2025	
2000 m	5:57.56	Katelyn Tuohy	North Rockland High School	Thiells, New York	Staten Island, New York		January 16, 2018	
3000 m	9:01.81	Katelyn Tuohy	North Rockland High School	Thiells, New York	Fort Washington Avenue Armory	Dr. Sander Invitational	January 26, 2019	
3000 m	9:00.16 OT	Alexa Efraimson	Camas High School	Camas, Washington	Seattle, Washington		February 1, 2014	
Two miles	9:38.68	Mary Cain	Bronxville High School	Bronxville, New York	Roxbury, Boston Massachusetts		February 2, 2013	
5000 m	15:13.26	Jane Hedengren	Timpview High School	Provo, Utah	Fort Washington Avenue Armory	Nike Indoor Nationals	March 13, 2025	
50 m hurdles	6.95	Candy Young	Beaver Falls High School	Beaver Falls, Pennsylvania	Edmonton, Alberta Canada		February 3, 1979	
55 m hurdles	7.46	Tonea Marshall	Seguin High School	Arlington, Texas	Fort Washington Avenue Armory	Nike Outdoor Nationals	March 13, 2016	
60 m hurdles	8.02	Tonea Marshall	Seguin High School	Arlington, Texas	Fort Washington Avenue Armory	Nike Outdoor Nationals	March 13, 2016	
High jump	1.99 m (6 ft 6 1/4 in)	Vashti Cunningham	Bishop Gorman	Las Vegas, Nevada	Portland	World Championships	March 12, 2016	
Pole vault	4.61 m (15 ft 1 1/4 in) A	Amanda Moll	Olympia High School	Olympia, Washington	Reno, Nevada	Pole Vault Summit	13 January 2023	
Pole vault	4.54 m (14 ft 10 1/2 in) (low altitude)	Hana Moll	Olympia High School	Olympia, Washington	Seattle, Washington	Washington Invitational	28 January 2023	
Long jump	6.68 m (21 ft 10 3/4 in)	Tara Davis	Agoura High School	Agoura Hills, California	Frisco, Texas		February 11, 2017	
Triple jump	13.58 m (44 ft 6 1/2 in)	Ke’Nyia Richardson	Holy Names High School	Oakland, California	Fort Washington Avenue Armory	Nike Indoor Nationals	March 11, 2007	
Shot put	17.51 m (57 ft 5 1/4 in)	Alyssa Wilson	Donovan Catholic	Toms River, New Jersey	Fort Washington Avenue Armory	Eastern States Indoor Championships	February 28, 2017	
Weight throw	20.79 m (68 ft 2 1/2 in)	Shelby Ashe	Pius X High School	Atlanta, Georgia	Fort Washington Avenue Armory	Nike Indoor Nationals	March 13, 2011	
Pentathlon	4302 pts	Anna Hall	Valor Christian High School	Highlands Ranch, Colorado	Ocean Breeze Athletic Complex	USA Championships	February 22, 2019	
Pentathlon	60m H / High jump / Shot put / Long jump / 800m; 8.59 / 1.81 m (5 ft 11 1/4 in) / 12.71 m (41 ft 8 1/4 in) / 5.60 m (18 ft 4 1/4 in) / 2:16.11							
1500 m walk	6:02.85	Taylor Ewert	Beavercreek	Beavercreek, Ohio	Fort Washington Avenue Armory	Millrose Games	February 9, 2019	
Mile walk	6:28.21	Taylor Ewert	Beavercreek	Beavercreek, Ohio	Fort Washington Avenue Armory	Millrose Games	February 9, 2019	
3000 m walk	13:00.56	Taylor Ewert	Beavercreek	Beavercreek, Ohio	Lynchburg	Virginia Showcase	January 17, 2020	
4 × 200 m relay	1:34.75	Shaniya Hall; Leah Phillips; Ashley Seymour; Masai Russell	Bullis School	Potomac, Maryland	Fort Washington Avenue Armory	Nike Indoor Nationals	March 10, 2018	
4 × 400 m relay	3:35.54	Kennedy Brown (55.57); Chrishell Campbell (53.31); Morgan Rothwell (53.70); Sydney Sutton (52.96)	Bullis School	Potomac, Maryland	Brighton, Massachusetts	New Balance Nationals Indoor	16 March 2025	
4 × 800 m relay	8:48.02	Justine Preisano (2:14.19); Stella Kermes (2:12.12); Alyssa Preisano (2:13.32); Charlotte Bell (2:08.49)	Cuthbertson High School	Waxhaw, North Carolina	Brighton, Massachusetts		12 March 2023	
4 × 1500 m relay	18:50.91	Elizabeth Caldwell 4:52.7; Jessica Donohue 4:55.7; Samantha Nadel 4:29.8; Brianna Nerud 4:32.7	North Shore High School	Glen Head, New York	New York City		December 16, 2011	
4 × Mile relay	19:22.70	Josie Schihl; Stella Kermes; Justine Preisano; Charlotte Bell	Cuthbertson High School	Waxhaw, North Carolina	Boston, Massachusetts		7 March 2024	
Sprint medley relay	3:52.68	Lanae-Tava Thomas; Tori Thompson; Ceara Watson; Samantha Watson 2:06.78	Rush-Henrietta High School	Henrietta, New York	Fort Washington Avenue Armory	Nike Indoor Nationals	March 14, 2015	
Distance medley relay	11:17.50	Justine Preisano 3:29.34; Tatoiana Blake 58.57; Stella Kermes 2:12.10; Charlotte Bell 4:37.49	Cuthbertson High School	Waxhaw, North Carolina	Boston, Massachusetts		8 March 2024	
4 x 55 meters hurdles relay	30.44	Lauryn Harris; Masai Russell; Leah Phillips; Cierra Pyles	Bullis School	Potomac, Maryland	Fort Washington Avenue Armory	Nike Indoor Nationals	March 10, 2018	
