= The Track at New Balance =

Track and field stadium in Boston Massachusetts, U.S.

The TRACK at New Balance
- Location in the United States Location in Massachusetts
- Address: 91 Guest Street
- Location: Boston Massachusetts, 02135; U.S.
- Coordinates: 42.356467°N 71.145292°W
- Elevation: 28 feet (10 m) AMSL
- Owner: New Balance
- Operator: The Bowery Group
- Capacity: 5000

Construction
- Groundbreaking: 2019; 7 years ago
- Opened: 2022
- Architect: Elkus Manfredi Architects

The TRACK at New Balance is a 455,000 square foot facility housing a track and field stadium located near Boston Landing station in Boston, Massachusetts, United States.

Construction began in April 2019, and the facility opened in 2022. It was designed by architecture firm Elkus Manfredi, and was a finalist for the 2023 World Architecture News Awards in the leisure category.

The facility includes a 200 meter hydraulically-banked track, and allows space for 5,000 spectators. There is also 24,000 square feet dedicated athletes warming up, a separate live music entertainment venue for up to 3,500 people, and a 20,000 square foot sports research lab. The track can be converted to space for basketball and volleyball courts as well as turf fields.

== Major competitions hosted ==
- NCAA Division I Indoor Track and Field Championships: 2024
- New Balance Indoor Grand Prix: 2023–2025
- New Balance Indoor Nationals: 2023–2026

== Records set at the facility ==
Taken from athletes world athletics profiles.

Date	Athlete / team	Event	Record	Time
April 15, 2022	New Balance (United States) (Heather MacLean, Kendall Ellis, Roisin Willis, Elle Purrier St. Pierre)	Distance medley relay	WR	10:33.85
February 4, 2023	Femke Bol (Netherlands)	500 metres	WB	1:05.63
February 4, 2023	Leah Anderson (Jamaica)	500 metres	NR	1:08.34
February 4, 2023	Ester Guerrero (Spain)	Mile run	NR	4:24.92
February 4, 2023	Nozomi Tanaka (Japan)	Mile run	NR	4:28.94
March 11, 2023	Issamade Asinga (Suriname)	60 metres	HSR, NR	6.57
March 11, 2023	Tyrone Gorze (United States)	5000 metres	HSR	13:56.82
March 12, 2023	Cuthbertson High School (Justine Preisano, Stella Kermes, Alyssa Preisano, Charlotte Bell)	4 × 800 metres relay	HSR	8:48.02
March 12, 2023	Adaejah Hodge (British Virgin Islands)	200 metres	HSR	22.33
March 12, 2023	Issamade Asinga (Suriname)	200 metres	HSR	20.48
February 4, 2024	Tobi Amusan (Nigeria)	60m Hurdles	NR	7.75
February 4, 2024	Jessica Hull (Australia)	3000 metres	NR	8:24.93
February 4, 2024	Marta Garcia (Spain)	3000 metres	NR	8:38.34
February 4, 2024	Marco Arop (Canada)	1000 metres	NR	2:14.74
February 4, 2024	Nozomi Tanaka (Japan)	1500 metres	NR	4:08.46
March 8, 2024	Parker Valby (United States)	5000 metres	NCAA Record	14:52.79
March 9, 2024	Rachel Glenn (United States)	High Jump	NCAA Record	2.00 m
March 10, 2024	Quincy Wilson (United States)	400 Metres	HSR	45.76
February 2, 2025	Quincy Wilson (United States)	400 Metres	HSR, U18	45.66
February 2, 2025	Andrew Coscoran (Republic of Ireland)	3000 metres	NR	7:30.75
February 2, 2025	Azzedine Habz (France)	3000 metres	NR	7:31.50
February 2, 2025	Cameron Myers (Australia)	3000 metres	NR	7:33.12
February 2, 2025	Sarah Healy (Republic of Ireland)	3000 metres	NR	8:35.19
February 2, 2025	Jochem Vermeulen (Belgium)	1500 metres	NR	3:36.17
February 2, 2025	Julien Alfred (Saint Lucia)	300m	NR	36.16
February 2, 2025	Gabija Galvydyte (Lithuania)	Mile run	NR	4:28.42
February 2, 2025	Nozomi Tanaka (Japan)	Mile run	NR	4:28.54
March 13, 2025	IMG Academy (Anyla Robinson, Aurora Bertelsen Del Solar, Mackenzie Winning and Danielle Graham)	4 × 800 metres relay	HSR	8:46.04
January 24, 2026	Cameron Myers (Australia)	3000 metres	NR	7:27.57
January 24, 2026	Klaudia Kazimierska (Poland)	1500 metres	NR	4:01.78
January 24, 2026	Gabija Galvydytė (Lithuania)	1500 metres	NR	4:03.44
January 24, 2026	Hobbs Kessler (United States)	2000 metres	WR	4:48.79
January 24, 2026	Pieter Sisk (Belgium)	2000 metres	NR	4:52.41
January 24, 2026	Şilan Ayyildiz (Turkey)	3000 metres	NR	8:42.29
January 24, 2026	Josh Hoey (United States)	800 metres	NR	1:42.50
January 24, 2026	Ryan Clarke (Netherlands)	800 metres	NR	1:44.72
