= Shana Woods =

American track and field athlete

Personal information
- Nationality: United States
- Born: July 7, 1988 (age 38)

Sport
- Events: Heptathlon, 100 meters hurdles
- College team: USC Trojans
Medal record
Women's athletics
Representing the United States
Olympic Games
Pan American Junior Championships
Silver medal – second place	2007 São Paulo	Heptathlon

Shana Woods (born July 7, 1988 in Bellflower, California) is an American track and field athlete. She holds the current national high school record in the multiple event heptathlon, which she set while attending Long Beach Polytechnic High School in Long Beach, California. She has exhibited proficiency in a variety of events. While still a sophomore at Long Beach Poly, she joined her teammates, including senior Shalonda Solomon in setting national high school records in the 4 × 400 metres relay, 4 × 200 metres relay and indoor 4 × 400 metres relay. All those records still stand. The indoor record also counts as the current U.S. Junior record.

At the 2004 CIF California State Meet, sophomore Woods won the individual Long Jump and including running on the relay accounted for 32 points as her team won the State Championship. As a senior in 2006, she won the 100 meters hurdles and 300 meter hurdles along with anchoring Poly to three relay wins at the Arcadia Invitational. At the state meet, Poly was beaten by crosstown rival Wilson.

After setting her heptathlon record of 5,533 points at the 2006 USATF Junior Championships, she was chosen to represent the USA at the 2006 World Junior Championships in Athletics and the 2007 Pan American Junior Athletics Championships, where she earned the silver medal. She continued her education at the University of Southern California, majoring in Political Science.
