= Arcadia Invitational =

High school track and field meet in the United States

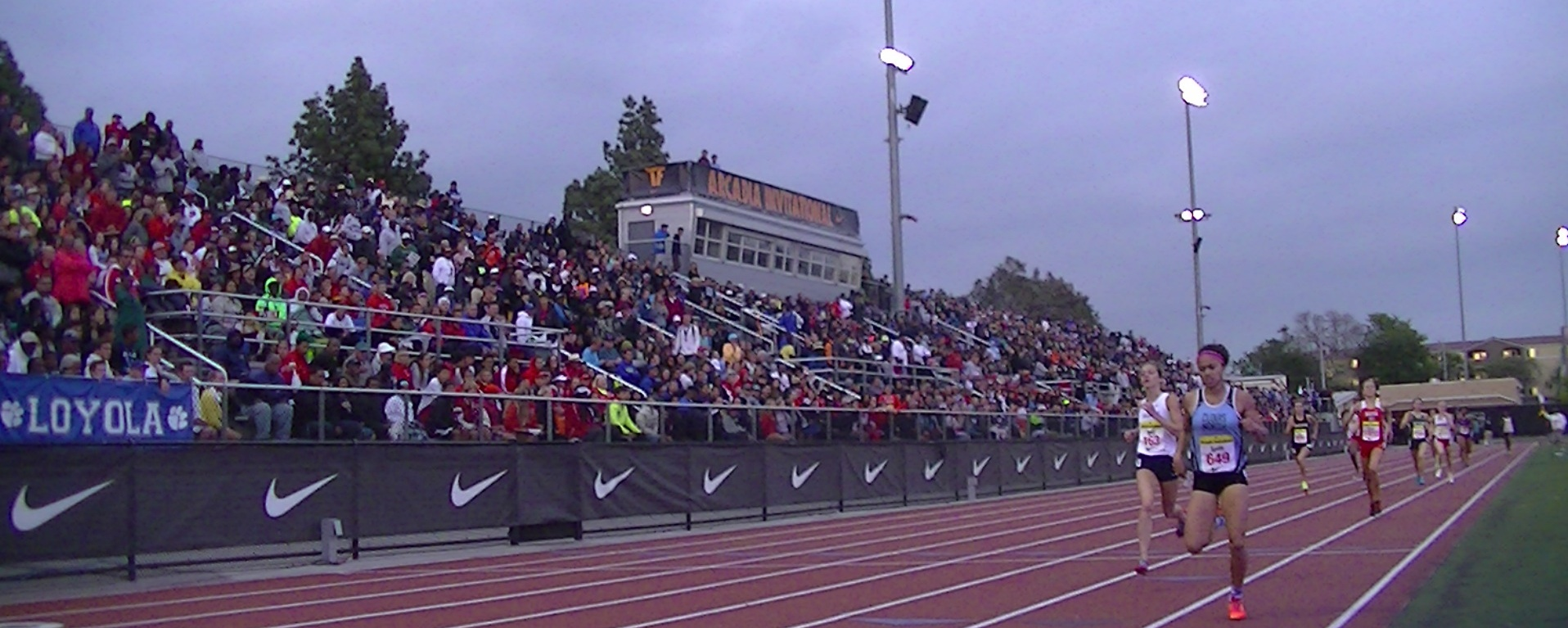

The Arcadia Invitational is a high school track and field meet in the United States. It is considered the most competitive meet in the country and has been billed as the "Home of National Records". The meet is held at Arcadia High School in Arcadia, California, on either the first or second weekend in April each year. The Arcadia Invitational attracts the top prep athletes in the United States and internationally (Canada, Mexico, Australia, Ireland, New Zealand, Argentina, and Brazil have been represented in recent years). The Arcadia Invitational has played host to 32 national high school records and has helped to produce 179 U.S. Olympians.

== History ==
In 1968, Arcadia High School track coach Doug Smith had an idea for an evening track and field meet for all the area schools. The first invitational was held more than 50 years ago, with 23 schools and six track clubs participating. Arcadia graduate Tracy Smith was the first of many future Olympic athletes to be a winner in the Arcadia Invitational. He went on to participate in the 1968 Mexico City Olympics. 1970 is the year that Doug Smith felt was a giant step in the development of the meet into more of a "Southern California" event. Santa Ana Coach Earl Engman, who was the Meet Director of the CIF-Southern Section championship affairs, entered his championship squad from Orange County, enhancing the event with the members of his top program from the greater San Gabriel Valley.

The invitational has since gone on to produce 32 U.S. high school records and 179 U.S. Olympians up to and including the 2016 U.S. Olympic Trials.

In 2002, the meet expanded from a single-day competition to a two-day affair as the newly formed Friday portion consisted of additional relays (sprint medleys, shuttle hurdles, 4x800, etc.) not common at most meets. In 2004, another (third) section of field events competition also was added to the Friday schedule.

In 2008, the Arcadia Multis were added on the Thursday-Friday of meet week, allowing top decathletes and heptathletes the chance to compete. It has become the premier multi-events competition for high schoolers, with both national decathlon records (high school implements and international implements) for boys achieved there. In 2010, the deepest quality field of high school heptathletes was featured.

The Arcadia Invitational is now among the largest outdoor high school meets in the United States, with more than 4,000 high school athletes competing. In terms of participation numbers, it is also the largest high school sporting event in the nation that is hosted on a high school campus.

As of 2017, Arcadia High School organization, Apache News, live streams the field events for the meet. They provide live coverage of the event split into three live streams, the first covering the pole vault and high jump, the second covering long jump and triple jump, and the third covering shotput and discus.

== 3200 meters ==
The boys' 3200-meter event has become a signature event for inspiring top performances. The competitive environment and weather are ideal for elite male athletes to break the 9-minute barrier. At the 2017 meet, an unprecedented 27 athletes broke 9 minutes (25 in the invitational section and 2 in the seeded section).

== Notable athletes ==
- Jordan Hasay
- Noah Lyles
- Will Claye
- Curtis Beach
- Sondre Guttormsen
- Jahvid Best
- Alysia Montano
- Quincy Watts
- Chaunte Lowe
- Steve Lewis
- Stephanie Brown-Trafton
- Danny Everett
- Amy Acuff
- Carmelita Jeter
- Ashton Eaton
- Valerie Brisco-Hooks
- Gail Devers
- Bryshon Nellum
- Jillian Camarena-Williams
- Mike Powell
- Shannon Rowbury
- Michael Marsh
- Marion Jones
- Meb Keflezighi
- Allyson Felix
- Monique Henderson
- Ryan Hall
- Lashinda Demus
- Kyle Alcorn
- Sydney McLaughlin
- Deena Kastor
- Jamie Nieto
- Michelle Perry
- Alan Webb
- Cathy Freeman, Australia
- Steve Smith
- Jessica Cosby
- Aretha Thurmond
- Sharon Day
- Chris Derrick
- Devon Allen

== Meet records ==
=== Boys ===
Boys' meeting records of the Arcadia Invitational
Event	Record	Athlete	School	Date	Ref.
100 m	10.17	Noah Lyles	T.C. Williams	2016	
200 m	20.35 (+0.7 m/s)	Brandon Arrington	Mount Miguel	12 April 2025	
400 m	45.48	Quincy Wilson	Bullis	11 April 2026	
800 m	1:47.96	Michael Granville	Bell Gardens	1995	
1600 m	3:59.51+	Alan Webb	South Lakes	2001	
Mile	4:01.81	Alan Webb	South Lakes	2001	
3200 m	8:31.80	Jackson Spencer	Herriman	11 April 2026	
5000 m	13:55.96	Chris Derrick	Neuqua Valley	2008	
110 m hurdles	13.43	Johnathan Cabral	Agoura	2011	
300 m hurdles	35.45	David Klech	California	2006	
High jump	7-3.00	Mike Morrison	Willingboro	2003	
Pole vault	18-02.50	Sondre Guttormsen	Davis	2018	
Long jump	25-3.75	Dion Bentley	Penn Hills	1989	
Triple jump	51-7.50	Will Claye	Mountain Pointe	2009	
Shot put	71-4.25	Brent Noon	Fallbrook	1990	
Discus throw	234-03	Niklas Arrhenius	Mountain View	2001	
Decathlon - International implements	7524 pts	Gunnar Nixon	Edmond Santa Fe	2011	
Decathlon - High School implements	7909 pts	Curtis Beach	Albuquerque	2009	
4 × 100 m relay	40.28	John Muir High School	Muir	1997	
4 × 200 m relay	1:24.15	Jaden Smith; Jaxon Harley; Rashon Luke; Jabari Bates	St. John Bosco	8 April 2022	
4 × 400 m relay	3:08.92	John Muir High School	Muir	1996	
4 × 800 m relay	7:42.36	Long Beach Polytechnic High School	Long Beach Poly	2003	
4 × 1600 m relay	16:41.30	American Fork High School	American Fork	2017	
Distance medley relay	9:57.88	Atlantic Community High School	Atlantic Community	2001	
800 m Sprint medley relay (1-1-2-4)	1:28.43	Long Beach Polytechnic High School	Long Beach Poly	2007	
1600 m Sprint medley relay (2-2-4-8)	3:26.36	Los Alamitos High School	Los Alamitos	2016	
4 × 110 m Shuttle hurdle relay	57.10	Davis Davis-Lyric; Kai Graves-Blanks; DeQuan January; Delaney Crawford	Upland	8 April 2022	

=== Girls ===
Girls' meeting records of the Arcadia Invitational
Event	Record	Athlete	School	Date	Ref.
100 m	11.32	Angela Williams	Chino Hills	1998	
200 m	22.87	Marion Jones	Rio Mesa	1991	
400 m	52.51	Monique Henderson	Morse	2001	
800 m	2:05.42	Allison Ince	Normal Community	9 April 2022	
1600 m	4:32.48	Sadie Engelhardt	Ventura	6 April 2024	
Mile	4:34.31	Sadie Engelhardt	Ventura	5 April 2024	
3200 m	9:52.66	Irene Riggs	Morgantown	8 April 2023	
Two miles	9:34.12	Jane Hedengren	Timpview	12 April 2025	
100 m hurdles	13.01 (+1.0 m/s)	Tara Davis	Agoura	2017	
300 m hurdles	38.90	Sydney McLaughlin	Union Catholic	8 April 2017	
High jump	6-02	Vashti Cunningham	Bishop Gorman	2014	
Pole vault	4.57 m (14 ft 11 3/4 in)	Hana Moll	Capital	8 April 2023	
Long jump	20-09.75	Jernae Wright	James Logan	1995	
Triple jump	43-05.00	Brittany Daniels	Merrill West	2005	
Shot put	52-1.25	Stamatia Scarvelis	Dos Pueblos	2014	
Discus throw	185-5	Anna Jelmini	Shafter	2009	
Heptathlon	5225 pts	Ashley Smith	Millikan	2010	
4 × 100 m relay	44.95	Long Beach Polytechnic High School	Long Beach Poly	2004	
4 × 200 m relay	1:33.87	Long Beach Polytechnic High School	Long Beach Poly	2004	
4 × 400 m relay	3:39.12	Wilson High School	Wilson	2001	
4 × 800 m relay	8:58.30	A. Randolph High School	A. Randolph	2002	
4 × 1600 m relay	19:56.08	Ell Lomeli; Sierra Cornett; Grace Hutchison; Sydney Sundgren	Buchanan	8 April 2022	
800 m Sprint medley relay (1-1-2-4)	1:38.73	Long Beach Polytechnic High School	Long Beach Poly	2003	
1600 m Sprint medley relay (2-2-4-8)	3:47.35	Union Catholic Regional High School; Sydney Chadwick; Abriyah Thompson; Abigail Robisky (53.83); Paige Sheppard (2:04.08)	Union Catholic	10 April 2026	
Distance medley relay	11:40.89	Harvard-Westlake School	Harvard-Westlake	2011	
4 × 100 m Shuttle hurdle relay	57.17	Vacaville High School	Vacaville	2014	
