= Sydney McLaughlin-Levrone =

American hurdler and sprinter (born 1999)

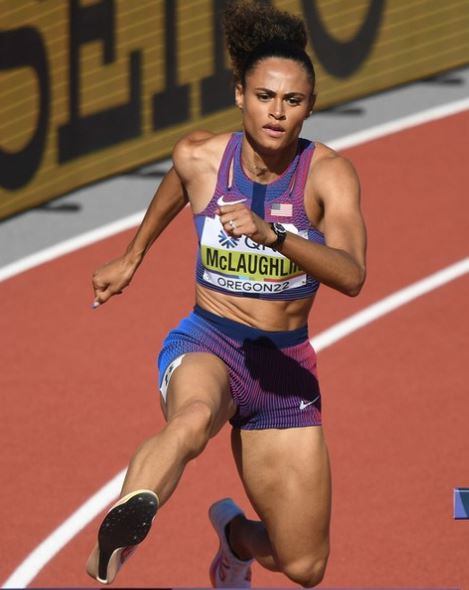
- McLaughlin-Levrone at the 2022 World Athletics Championships

Personal information
- Born: Sydney Michelle McLaughlin; August 7, 1999 (age 27) New Brunswick, New Jersey, U.S.
- Height: 5 ft 9 in (175 cm)
- Weight: 134 lb (61 kg)
- Spouse: Andre Levrone Jr. (m. 2022)

Sport
- Country: United States
- Sport: Track and field
- Events: 400 m hurdles; 400 m
- College team: Kentucky Wildcats (2017–2018)
- Coached by: Mike McCabe (2013–2017); Edrick Floréal (2017–2018); Joanna Hayes (2018–2020); Bob Kersee (2020–present)

Achievements and titles
- Highest world ranking: 1 (weeks 75, 400 m hurdles)
- Personal bests: 100 m: 11.07 w (2018); 200 m: 22.07 (2024); 400 m: 47.78 (2025, AR, NR); 100 mH: 12.65 (2021); 400 mH: 50.37 (2024, WR, OR); Short track; 200 m: 22.68 i (2018); 400 m: 50.36 i (2018)
Medal record
Women's athletics
Representing the United States
Olympic Games
Gold medal – first place	2020 Tokyo	400 m hurdles
Gold medal – first place	2020 Tokyo	4 × 400 m relay
Gold medal – first place	2024 Paris	400 m hurdles
Gold medal – first place	2024 Paris	4 × 400 m relay
World Championships
Gold medal – first place	2019 Doha	4 × 400 m relay
Gold medal – first place	2022 Eugene	400 m hurdles
Gold medal – first place	2022 Eugene	4 × 400 m relay
Gold medal – first place	2025 Tokyo	400 m
Gold medal – first place	2025 Tokyo	4 × 400 m relay
Silver medal – second place	2019 Doha	400 m hurdles
Diamond League
First place	2019	400 m hurdles
World Youth Championships
Gold medal – first place	2015 Cali	400 m hurdles

Sydney Michelle McLaughlin-Levrone (/məˈɡlɒklɪn ləvˈroʊni/ mə-GLOK-lin ləv-ROH-nee; née McLaughlin; born August 7, 1999) is an American hurdler and sprinter who holds the world record for the 400 meters hurdles and the American record for the flat 400 meters. She won gold in the 2020 and 2024 Summer Olympics, as well as at the 2022 World Athletics Championships and 2025 World Athletics Championships. She set a world record time in the 400 m hurdles of 50.37 seconds at the 2024 Summer Olympics on August 8, 2024, breaking the world record she previously set of 50.65 seconds. She set a championship record in the flat 400 of 47.78 at the 2025 World Championships, making her the second fastest woman in history over that distance. She was the first woman to break the 52-second (June 2021) and 51-second (July 2022) barriers in the 400 m hurdles. She won a silver medal at the 2019 World Championships. At all four competitions, she also took gold as part of the women's 4 × 400 m relay team.

As a 15-year-old, McLaughlin won the 400 m hurdles event at the 2015 World Youth Championships. In 2016, she was the youngest athlete since Denean Howard in 1980 to qualify for the U.S. Olympic track team, having placed third at the U.S. Olympic Trials, with the current world under-18 best of 54.15 seconds, then subsequently setting the world U20 record. She holds the current world U20 record of 53.60 seconds, having achieved a junior personal best of 52.75s (not ratified), with both marks set in 2018. Aside from McLaughlin-Levrone, only three other women have ever broken the 52 second barrier, and only one other has broken 51. She holds six of the ten all-time fastest 400 m hurdles times. She was the 2019 Diamond League champion.

In 2022, McLaughlin-Levrone was voted World Athletics Female Athlete of the Year. She became the fifth female athlete to receive this honor more than once when she was chosen again in 2025.

== Early life and background ==
McLaughlin-Levrone was born in New Brunswick, New Jersey, on August 7, 1999. She grew up in Dunellen, New Jersey.

Her parents are Willie McLaughlin and Mary Neumeister McLaughlin. Her father Willie was part of a long line of track & field stars from East Orange High School, in East Orange, New Jersey. He is a member of the Manhattan College Athletic Hall of Fame as a three-time All-American. He was a semi-finalist in the 400 meters at the 1984 Olympic Trials with a time of 45.72 seconds. Her mother Mary was a 2:12 half-miler at Cardinal O'Hara High School in Tonawanda, New York, where she ran on the boys' team. Her parents met as students at Manhattan College; there was no women's track team when Mary arrived in 1979, so she became the manager of the men's track team.

In addition to being successful academically, McLaughlin-Levrone took up running at an early age, following brother Taylor and their older sister Morgan. When she was 14, her father said, "All of our kids are fairly talented, but [Sydney's] a little special. We saw it coming. It was just a matter of time." She is a member of the class of 2017 at Union Catholic Regional High School in Scotch Plains, where she was the first two-time Gatorade Player of the Year in Track & Field. Her older sister, Morgan, ran for St. Peter's University. Her older brother, Taylor, ran for the University of Michigan, and won silver in the 400 meter hurdles at the 2016 IAAF World U20 Championships. Her younger brother, Ryan, took after his older siblings as a track stand-out at Union Catholic. He was the fifth member of the family to win a New Jersey county track title.

== High school and college career ==
At the national junior championships in 2014, McLaughlin-Levrone placed a close second behind Shamier Little in the 400-meter hurdles; her time of 55.63 s was a national high school freshman record and a world age-14 best. She would have qualified to represent the United States at the 2014 IAAF World Junior Championships, but was a year too young to be eligible. McLaughlin-Levrone also set a world age group best of 13.34 s in the 100-meter hurdles over 76.2 cm (2 ft 6.0 in) hurdles that summer.

In 2015, she improved her 400-meter hurdles best to 55.28 s at the national youth trials; the time was an age 15 world best, and ranked second on the all-time world youth list behind Leslie Maxie's world youth best (and national high school record) of 55.20 s set in 1984. She qualified for the World Youth Championships in Cali, Colombia, where she won gold in 55.94 s; she finished the year as the world youth and junior leader in the event.

=== 2016 ===
McLaughlin-Levrone won the 400-meter hurdles in 54.46 s at the New Balance national outdoor high school championships; the time broke Maxie's prep record and world youth best, as well as Lashinda Demus's American junior record of 54.70 s. In addition, she ran on Union Catholic's team in the sprint medley relay, running a fast 50.93 s split for 400 meters as the team set a new high school record of 2:07.99. She won the USATF junior championship in 54.54 s the following week; in recognition of her accomplishments, she was named Gatorade National Girls Athlete of the Year.

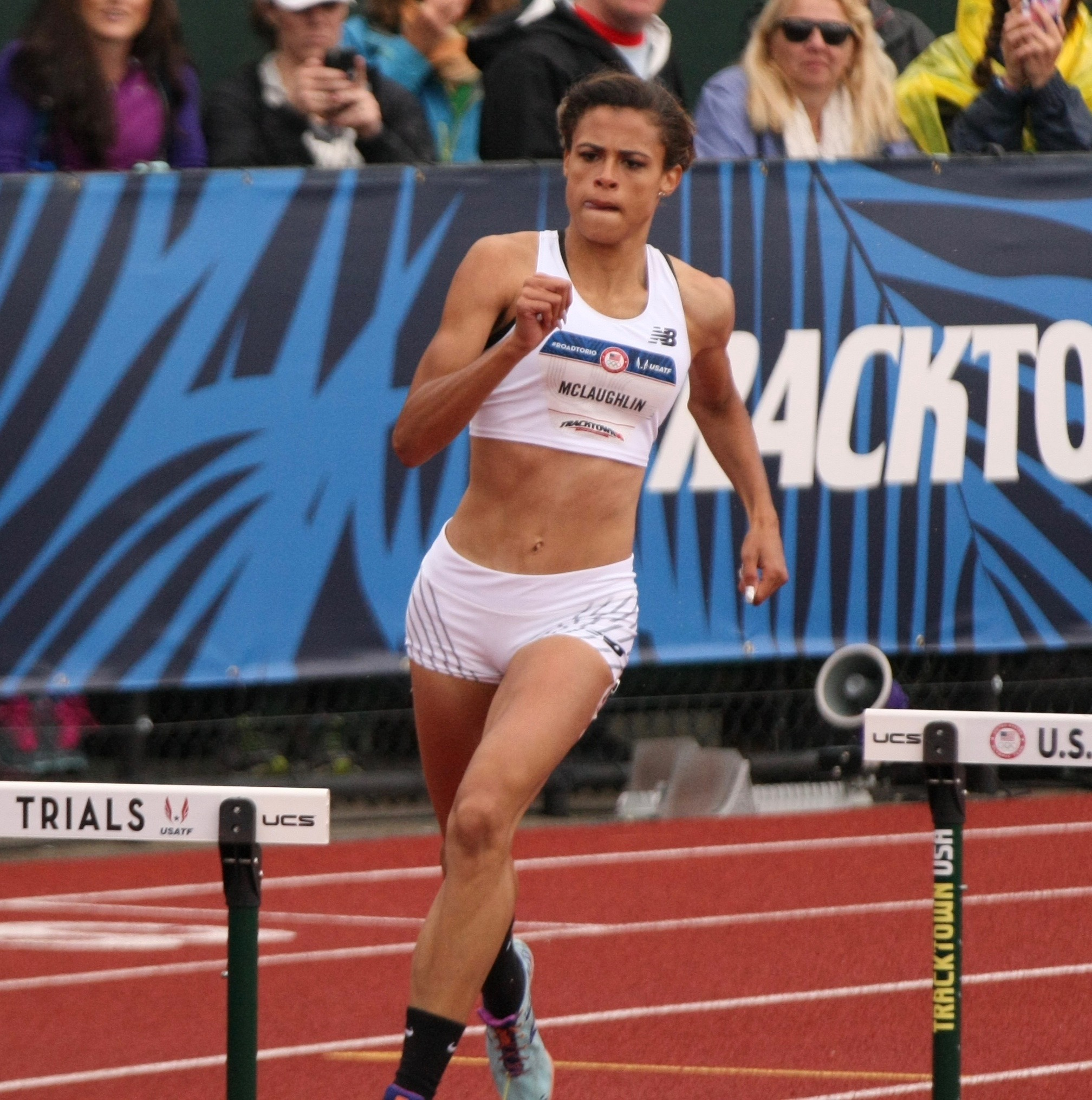
McLaughlin-Levrone at the 2016 U.S. Olympic Trials

McLaughlin-Levrone placed third in the 400-meter hurdles in 54.15 s at the US Olympic Trials , setting a new world youth best and world junior record and qualifying for the Olympics in Rio de Janeiro before her senior year in high school. She was the youngest athlete to make the American Olympic track and field team since Carol Lewis and Denean Howard qualified for the boycotted Moscow Olympics in 1980. At the Games, she placed fifth in her semi-final heat, failing to advance to the finals.

=== 2017 ===
She was part of an American record setting quartet that broke the indoor distance medley relay world record with a time of 10:40.31, set at the New Balance Indoor Grand Prix on January 28 at Boston's Reggie Lewis Center. The splits for the four legs were: 3:18.40 (1200 m) by Emma Coburn, 52.32 (400 m) by McLaughlin, 2:01.92 (800 m) by Brenda Martinez, and 4:27.66 (1600 m) by Jenny Simpson. Later that indoor season on March 12, McLaughlin-Levrone lowered her own national 400-meter record to a 51.61 s at the New Balance Nationals in New York City.

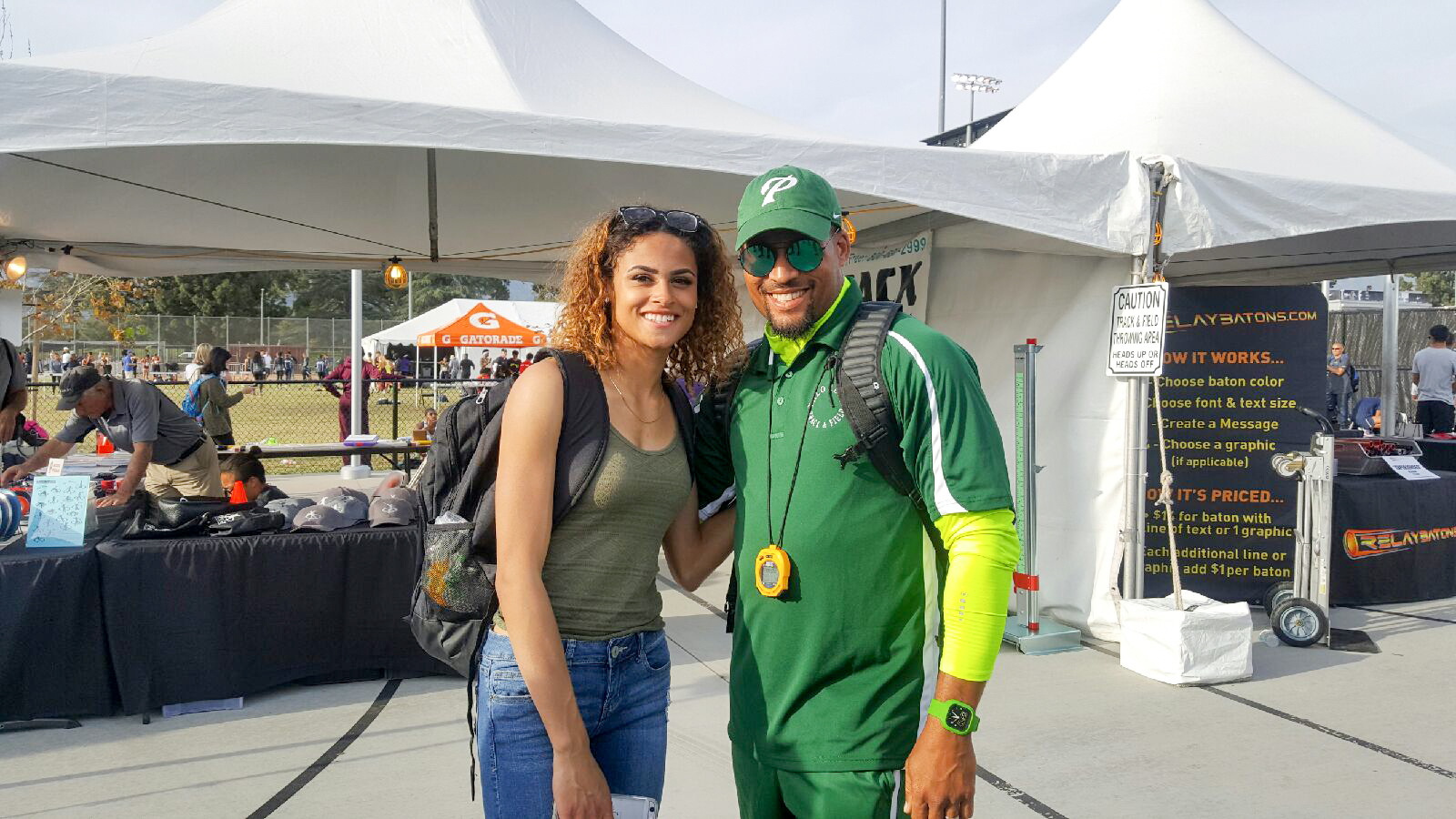
McLaughlin-Levrone with then-high school 800 m record holder Mike Granville in 2017

In April, McLaughlin-Levrone opened her outdoor season by breaking the 300 m hurdles national high school record at the Arcadia Invitational, running 38.90 s. The record was previously held by Lashinda Demus who achieved 39.98 s in 2001. The record was the first ever attempt over 300 m hurdles for McLaughlin-Levrone as high school track meets in New Jersey do not contest the 300 m hurdles. Her time was a North American record and number 2 all-time worldwide behind Zuzana Hejnová who ran 38.16 in 2013. Later that month, McLaughlin-Levrone ran the fastest ever high school girls relay split (400 m) during the Championship of America high school girls 4 × 400 at the 123rd Penn Relays. After taking the baton at the back of an eight-team field, she posted a split of 50.37 s, passing five teams to lead her Union Catholic relay team to a third-place finish in 3:38.92. McLaughlin-Levrone bettered this mark at the New Balance Nationals Outdoor Meet on June 18. Taking the baton in sixth place on the final handoff, she passed five runners to lead Union Catholic to victory, posting a split of 49.85 seconds.

McLaughlin-Levrone was named the Gatorade National Female Athlete of the Year in 2015–16 and 2016–17. She was the first athlete to repeat in the then-15-year history of the award. At the age of 17, she was on the cover of Sports Illustrated when she won the award the second time in July 2017 and the magazine said she "ranks as one of the most dominant high school athletes ever.". McLaughlin-Levrone also excelled in the classroom graduating with a GPA of 3.55. Additionally she volunteered for the Central Jersey Chapter of Hope Worldwide, distributed fire safety and disaster relief information to residents on behalf of the American Red Cross and donated time to Hurricane Sandy recovery efforts in Toms River, New Jersey.

=== University of Kentucky ===
In November 2016, McLaughlin-Levrone signed a National Letter of Intent to attend the University of Kentucky and compete for their track and field program.

In March 2018, she set the world junior 400-meter record of 50.36 seconds at the NCAA Division I Indoor Track and Field Championships. On May 13, McLaughlin-Levrone broke the collegiate record in the 400 m hurdles, running 52.75 s to win the event in her first SEC championship appearance.

External videos
- Sydney McGlaughlin-Levrone Hall of Fame Induction Speech UK Athletics video

On September 18, 2024, McLaughlin-Levrone was inducted into the University of Kentucky Athletic Hall of Fame. Although she attended the university for just one year and did not receive a degree, during her induction speech she told the audience: "I would not be the woman that I am had I not attended UK."

== Professional career ==
In June 2018, after one year at Kentucky, she forfeited her remaining eligibility to compete in college and turned professional, and signed a sponsorship deal with New Balance in October of the same year. Instead of hiring an agent specializing in athletes, McLaughlin-Levrone contracted with William Morris Endeavor, a firm that typically represents Hollywood stars.

She is coached by track coach Bob Kersee, whose successes have mainly been with female athletes.

=== 2019 ===
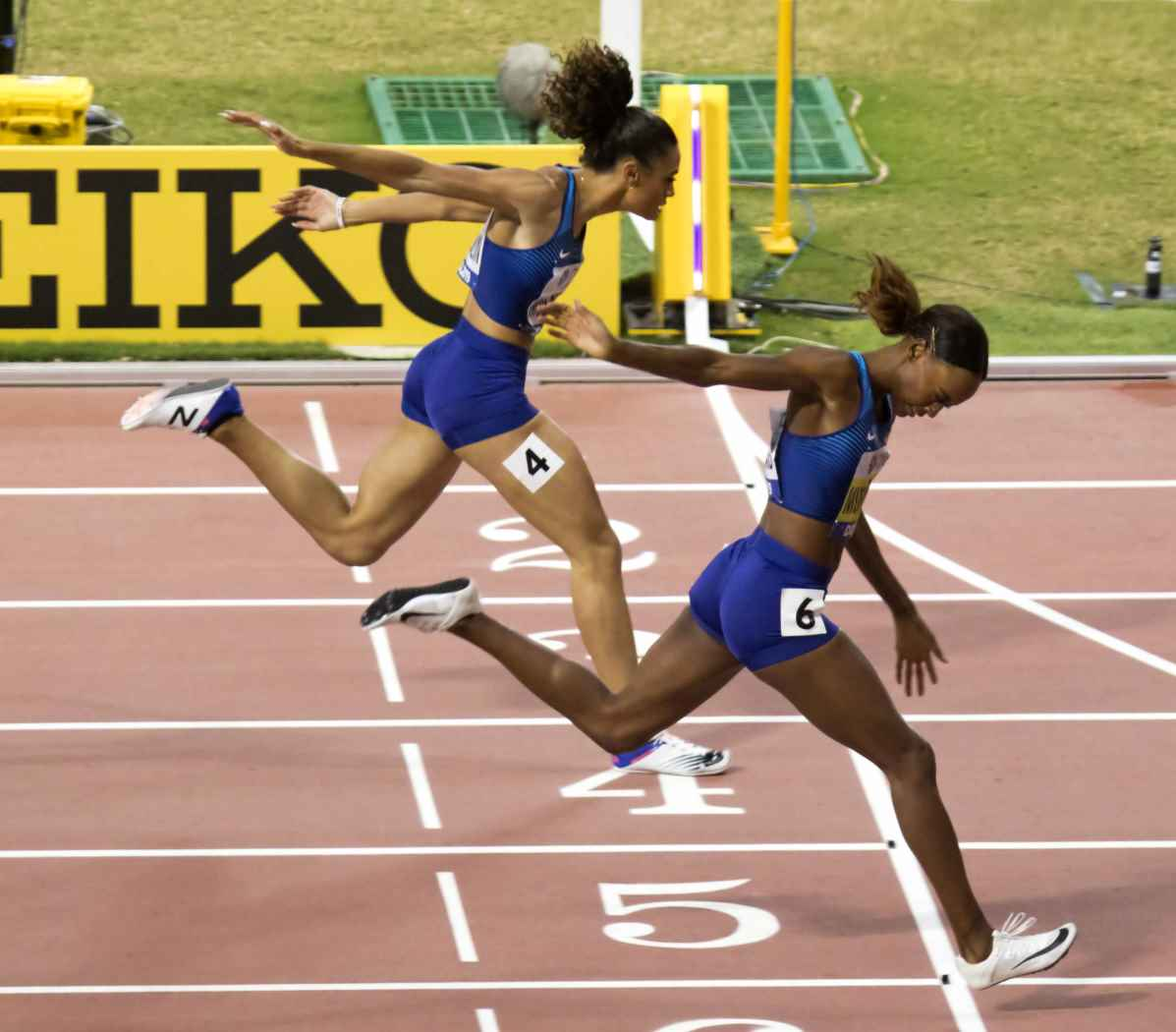
At the 2019 World Championships held in Doha, 29-year-old Dalilah Muhammad held off 20-year-old McLaughlin-Levrone by 0.07 seconds

At the World Athletics Championships, held between September 27 and October 6, 2019, in Doha, Qatar, McLaughlin-Levrone ran the 400 m hurdles in 52.23 s finishing in second place behind Dalilah Muhammad. She won every Diamond League she ran over 400 m hurdles that year, picking up wins in Oslo, Monaco, and the Diamond League Final in Zürich.

=== 2021 ===
In 2021, McLaughlin-Levrone defeated Muhammad at the Olympic Trials in Eugene, Oregon, setting a new world record in the process with her time of 51.90. Later, at the Olympic Games in Tokyo, McLaughlin-Levrone bettered her time to 51.46 to claim the Olympic gold. She later won a second gold as part of the women's 4 × 400 m relay.

=== 2022 ===
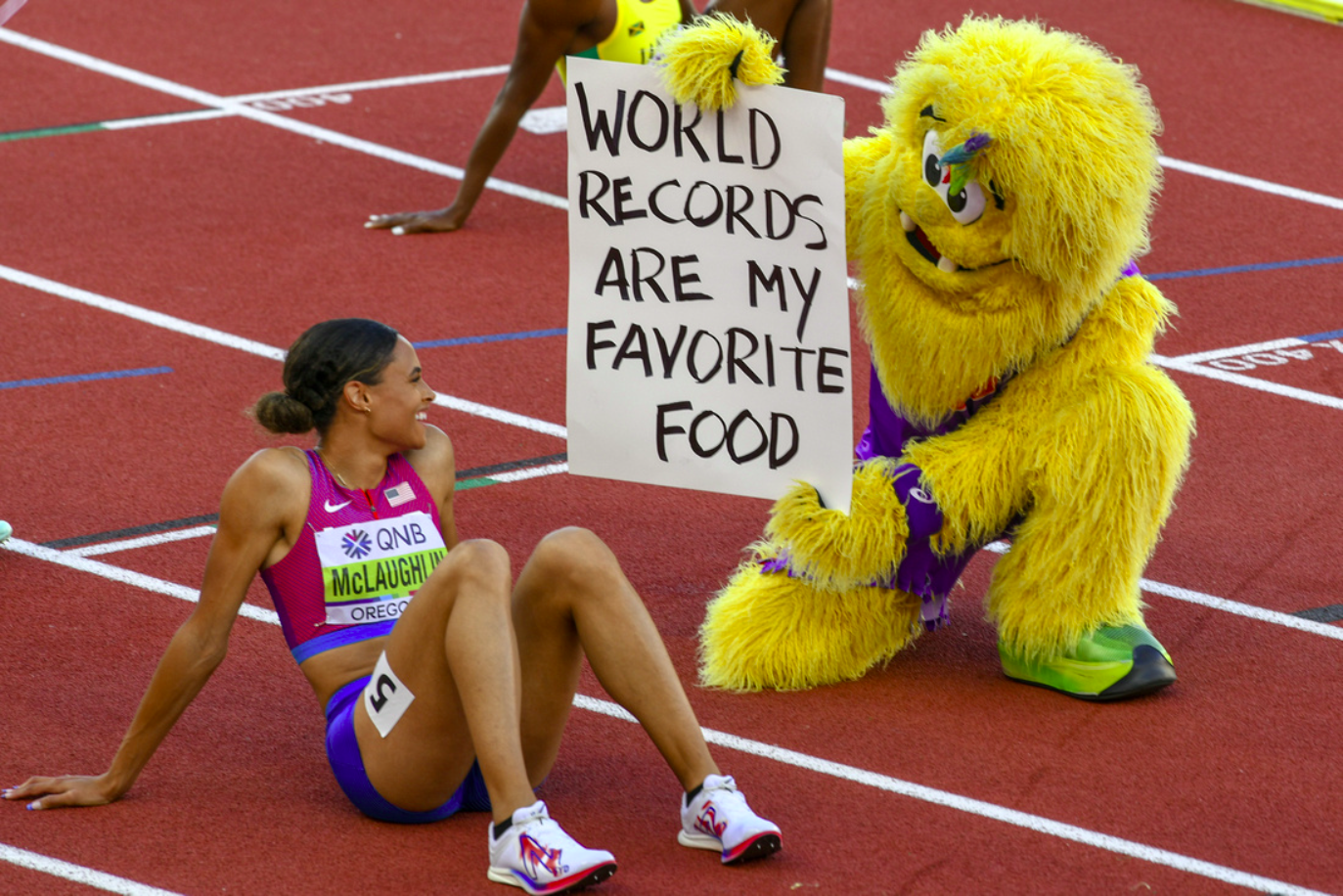
At the 2022 World Championships in Eugene, McLaughlin-Levrone became the first woman to break the 51-second barrier in the 400 m hurdles

In 2022, McLaughlin-Levrone opened her season at the Penn Relays Carnival, dropping down in distance to the 100 m hurdles, which she won in 12.75 seconds. In June, she broke her own world record in the 400-Meter Hurdles again, running a time of 51.41 seconds during the USATF Championships at Hayward Field in Eugene. A month later at the World Championships, also at Hayward Field, she broke her own world record again with a time of 50.68 seconds and became the first woman to run the 400-Meter hurdles in under 51-seconds. She also won gold as part of the Women's 4 × 400 m relay, running the final leg. She ended her season by winning at the Gyulai István Memorial in Szekesfehervar, setting a European all-comers record of 51.68 seconds.

=== 2023 ===
On June 9, 2023, in her first race running the 400 meters as a professional, McLaughlin-Levrone ran 49.71 seconds while finishing second to Marileidy Paulino at the Diamond League meet in Paris, France. Later that month, McLaughlin-Levrone ran 49.51 at the New York Grand Prix. On July 8, 2023, McLaughlin-Levrone produced a world-leading performance of 48.74 seconds at the USATF Championships in Eugene, Oregon, narrowly missing out on Sanya Richards-Ross's American record of 48.70 seconds.

On August 11, 2023, she withdrew from the 2023 World Athletics Championships due to a knee injury.

=== 2024 ===
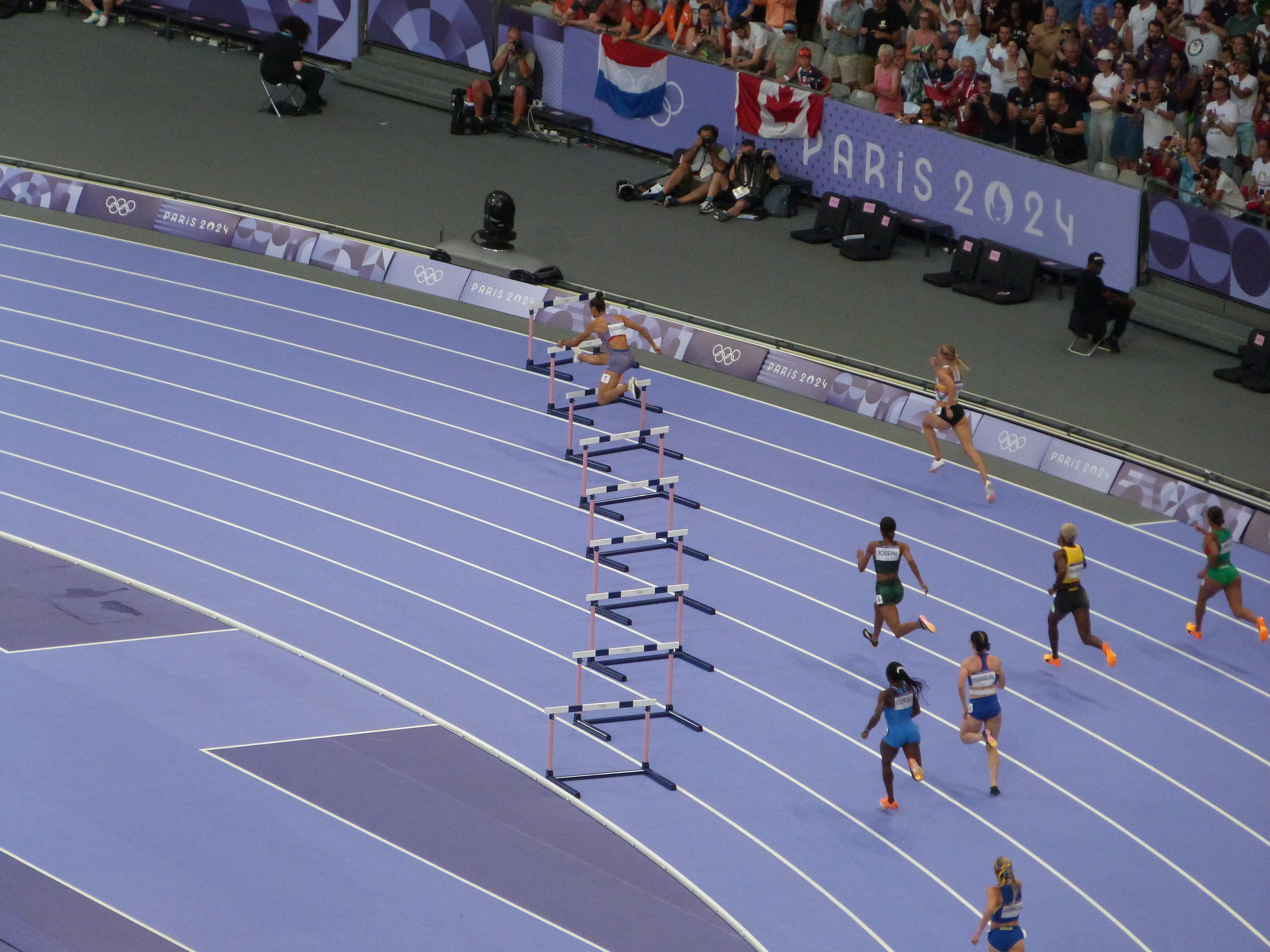
McLaughlin-Levrone ahead of the competition in her 400 m hurdles semi-final at the 2024 Paris Olympics

On May 18, McLaughlin-Levrone won the 200 m at the Los Angeles Grand Prix, beating 200 m specialists such as Gabby Thomas and Abby Steiner. At the New York Grand Prix in June, McLaughlin-Levrone competed in her first 400 m race of the season with a then-world-leading time of 48.75, just 0.01 seconds slower than her personal best. Having led the race early on, she powered ahead at 200 metres to beat the second-place finisher, Talitha Diggs, by over two seconds.

In June, McLaughlin-Levrone signed with Michael Johnson's Grand Slam Track league for the then-upcoming 2025 season, in the long hurdles (400 m hurdles / 400 m flat) category.

On June 30, at the 2024 Olympic Trials, McLaughlin-Levrone broke her own 400-meter hurdles world record once more, finishing with a time of 50.65 seconds and qualifying for the 2024 Summer Olympics. On August 8, 2024, at the Olympic Games in Paris, McLaughlin-Levrone once again broke her own world record, finishing with a time of 50.37 seconds and defending her Olympic title. She went on to win another gold as part of the Women's 4 × 400 m relay.

On September 3, 2024, it was announced that McLaughlin-Levrone would compete in both the 200 and 400 m in the 2024 Diamond League finals in Brussels, Belgium, on September 13 and 14. However, a day later, Diamond League CEO Petr Stastny said that she was ineligible to compete in the finals, because she hadn't competed in any Diamond League events in the 2024 season, so she hadn't accumulated any points and didn't qualify for a wild card. She went on to compete in the pre-programme events in these distances instead, winning both with times of 22.40 and 49.11 seconds respectively.

=== 2025 ===
On April 6, at the Grand Slam Track’s inaugural event in Kingston, Jamaica. McLaughlin-Levrone ran an impressive 50.32 seconds in the 400 meter flat, despite windy conditions for a win. She also sped to a 52.76 world-leading time in the 400 m hurdles.

On May 3, in Miami, Florida, McLaughlin-Levrone posted a time of 52.07 seconds in the 400 meter hurdles to win her 12th consecutive 400 meter hurdle finals.

On May 31, at Grand Slam Track’s Philadelphia meet, Mclaughlin-Levrone moved away from her traditional 400 m hurdles and 400 m flat races to take on the short hurdles. In the 100 m hurdles, she finished fifth with a time of 12.70.

On September 16, during the semi-finals at the 2025 World Athletics Championships in Tokyo, Japan, Mclaughlin-Levrone broke the U.S. record for the women's 400 meters; running that distance in 48.29 seconds. Two days later, on September 18, Mclaughlin-Levrone won the 400 m final in a time of 47.78, the second-fastest time ever run by a woman and a new championship record. On the final day of the Tokyo meet McLaughlin-Levrone earned a second gold medal anchoring the U.S. women's 4 × 400 meter relay team to victory on a rain soaked track. McLaughlin-Levrone's anchor split of 47.82 seconds gave the U.S. a meet record of 3:16.61, the fifth fastest time ever for women's 4 × 400 meters.

== Personal life ==
McLaughlin-Levrone is married to Andre Levrone Jr. (born March 9, 1995), who played four seasons at wide receiver for the University of Virginia before graduating in 2018, and who was with three NFL teams before retiring in 2020 without ever playing in a regular-season NFL game. Levrone and McLaughlin announced their engagement on August 25, 2021, at the Four Seasons Resort, Scottsdale. They married at Early Mountain Vineyards in Madison, Virginia on May 5, 2022. On July 12, 2026, she and her husband announced the birth of their first child, Savannah Michelle Levrone.

McLaughlin-Levrone is a Christian. She and her husband are part of Grace Community Church in Los Angeles, and Andre is enrolled at The Master's Seminary, which is affiliated with the church.

Her hometown of Dunellen, New Jersey, named the track at the town's Columbia Park for McLaughlin-Levrone on August 28, 2021.

On January 30, 2024, McLaughlin-Levrone released Far Beyond Gold: Running from Fear to Faith, an autobiographical book recounting her life and experiences from the 2016 U.S. Olympic trials through the 2023 outdoor season. McLaughlin-Levrone's book focuses on her running career, while showcasing her journey to become closer to God. Her goal in writing this book was to not only share her personal journey, but also encourage others to do the same.

McLaughlin-Levrone is also an investor in USL Championship soccer club OKC Energy.

== Endorsements ==
Mclaughlin-Levrone has endorsements with brands including New Balance, Gatorade, Procter & Gamble, TAG Heuer, Coca-Cola, Visa Inc., and Oakley, Inc.. She signed her first deal with New Balance at age 19 and is worth reportedly $2 million per year.

== Personal bests ==
Information from World Athletics profile unless otherwise noted.

Outdoor

Event	Performance	Location	Date	Notes
100 meters	11.21 (+0.1 m/s)	Philadelphia	June 1, 2025	
100 meters	11.07 (+3.5 m/s)	Knoxville	April 13, 2018	Wind assisted
200 meters	22.07 (+0.3 m/s)	Los Angeles	May 18, 2024	
400 meters	47.78	Tokyo	September 18, 2025	CR, AR
100 meters hurdles	12.65 (+2.0 m/s)	Walnut	May 9, 2021	
300 meters hurdles	38.90	Arcadia	April 9, 2017	AHSR, U20AB, NA
400 meters hurdles	50.37	Paris	August 8, 2024	WR, OR

Indoor

Event	Performance	Location	Date	Notes
55 meters	7.66	New York	March 3, 2015	
60 meters	7.33	Boston	February 4, 2023	
200 meters	22.68	College Station	March 9, 2018	
300 meters	36.12	Bloomington	December 8, 2017	U20WR
400 meters	50.36	College Station	March 10, 2018	U20AR (Note: Though her indoor 400 m time of 50.36 s was faster than the world under-20 record as recognized by World Athletics, it had not been ratified and was not listed as pending ratification as of June 2021.)
500 meters	1:09.46	Boston	January 26, 2019	
60 meters hurdles	8.17	New York	March 15, 2015	

Progression

400 meters
Year	Time	Location	Date	Notes
2014	54.36	Plainfield	May 14	
2014	54.08	Toms River	May 24	
2014	53.78	Egg Harbor City	May 31	
2015	52.59	South Plainfield	May 30	
2016	52.44	Egg Harbor City	June 3	
2016	51.87	Berkeley Heights	June 8	
2018	50.07	Gainesville	March 30	
2023	49.71	Paris	June 9	
2023	49.51	New York	June 24	
2023	48.74	Eugene	July 8	
2025	48.29	Tokyo	September 16	
2025	47.78	Tokyo	September 18	

400 meters hurdles
Year	Time	Location	Date	Notes
2014	55.63	Eugene	July 6	
2015	55.28	Lisle	July 1	
2016	54.46	Greensboro	June 19	
2016	54.15	Eugene	July 10	U18WB
2017	54.03	Egg Harbor	June 2	
2017	53.82	Sacramento	June 25	
2018	53.60	Fayetteville	April 28	U20WR
2018	52.75	Knoxville	May 13	
2019	52.23	Doha	October 4	
2021	51.90	Eugene	June 27	WR
2021	51.46	Tokyo	August 4	WR
2022	51.41	Eugene	June 25	WR
2022	50.68	Eugene	July 22	WR
2024	50.65	Eugene	June 30	WR
2024	50.37	Paris	August 8	WR

== Competition results ==
Information from World Athletics profile unless otherwise noted.

International championships

Representing the United States
Year	Competition	Venue	Position	Event	Time	Notes
2015	World Youth Championships	Cali	1st	400 m hurdles	55.94	CR
2016	Olympic Games	Rio	sf (17th)	400 m hurdles	56.22	
2019	World Championships	Doha	2nd	400 m hurdles	52.23	PB, 3rd all time
2019	World Championships	Doha	1st	4 × 400 m relay	3:18.92	WL, (48.78 split)
2021	Olympic Games	Tokyo	1st	400 m hurdles	51.46	WR, OR
2021	Olympic Games	Tokyo	1st	4 × 400 m relay	3:16.85	SB
2022	World Championships	Eugene	1st	400 m hurdles	50.68	WR
2022	World Championships	Eugene	1st	4 × 400 m relay	3:17.79	WL, (47.91 split)
2024	Olympic Games	Paris	1st	400 m hurdles	50.37	WR, OR
2024	Olympic Games	Paris	1st	4 × 400 m relay	3:15.27	WL, AR, (47.71 split)
2025	World Championships	Tokyo	1st	400 meters	47.78	CR, AR, WL
2025	World Championships	Tokyo	1st	4 × 400 m relay	3:16.61	CR, WL, (47.78 split)

Grand Slam Track results
Slam	Race group	Event	Pl.	Time	Prize money
2025 Kingston Slam	Long hurdles	400 m hurdles	1st	52.76	US$100,000
2025 Kingston Slam	Long hurdles	400 m	1st	50.32	US$100,000
2025 Miami Slam	Long hurdles	400 m hurdles	1st	52.07	US$100,000
2025 Miami Slam	Long hurdles	400 m	1st	49.69	US$100,000
2025 Philadelphia Slam	Short hurdles	100 m hurdles	5th	12.70	US$50,000
2025 Philadelphia Slam	Short hurdles	100 m	2nd	11.21	US$50,000

Wins and titles

- Diamond League 400 m hurdles champion: 2019
  - 2019 (3) (400 mH): Oslo Bislett Games, Monaco Herculis, Zürich Weltklasse

National championships

Representing Union Catholic Vikings (2014–2017), Kentucky Wildcats (2018), and New Balance (2019–present)
Year	Competition	Venue	Position	Event	Time	Notes
2014	NSAF Indoor Nationals	New York	11th	60 m hurdles	8.67	
2014	NSAF Indoor Nationals	New York	4th	4 × 200 m relay	1:40.61	
2014	NSAF Nationals	Greensboro	2nd	100 m hurdles	13.34	(+0.5 m/s wind), PB
2014	NSAF Nationals	Greensboro	7th	4 × 200 m relay	1:41.42	
2014	NSAF Nationals	Greensboro	1st	400 m hurdles	56.89	PB
2014	USATF Junior Championships	Eugene	2nd	400 m hurdles	55.63	PB
2015	NSAF Indoor Nationals	New York	1st	60 m hurdles	8.17	PB
2015	NSAF Nationals	Greensboro	1st	400 m hurdles	55.87	SB
2015	U.S. World Youth Trials	Lisle	1st	400 m hurdles	55.28	PB
2016	NSAF Indoor Nationals	New York	1st	400 m	51.84	CR, PB
2016	NSAF Indoor Nationals	New York	1st	4 × 400 m relay	3:40.28	CR
2016	NSAF Nationals	Greensboro	1st	400 m hurdles	54.46	CR, PB
2016	USATF Junior Championships	Clovis	1st	400 m hurdles	54.54	
2016	U.S. Olympic Trials	Eugene	3rd	400 m hurdles	54.15	PB
2017	NSAF Indoor Nationals	New York	1st	400 m	51.61	CR, PB
2017	NSAF Nationals	Greensboro	1st	400 m hurdles	54.22	CR
2017	USATF Championships	Sacramento	6th	400 m hurdles	53.82	PB
2018	NCAA Division I Indoor Championships	College Station	2nd	400 m	50.36	PB
2018	NCAA Division I Indoor Championships	College Station	5th	4 × 400 m relay	3:30.08	
2018	NCAA Division I Indoor Championships	College Station	4th	200 m	22.80	
2018	NCAA Division I Championships	Eugene	1st	400 m hurdles	53.96	
2018	NCAA Division I Championships	Eugene	4th	4 × 400 m relay	3:30.52	
2019	USATF Championships	Des Moines	2nd	400 m hurdles	52.88	SB
2021	U.S. Olympic Trials	Eugene	1st	400 m hurdles	51.90	WR
2022	USATF Championships	Eugene	1st	400 m hurdles	51.41	WR
2023	USATF Championships	Eugene	1st	400 m	48.74	WL, MR, PB
2024	U.S. Olympic Trials	Eugene	1st	400 m hurdles	50.65	WR
2025	USATF Championships	Eugene	1st	400 m	48.90	

== Honors and awards ==
- Gatorade Player of the Year awards

Female Athlete of the Year: 2016, 2017
Female Track and Field Athlete of the Year: 2016, 2017

- World Athletics Awards

Rising Star (Women)：2018
World Athlete of the Year (Women)：2022 and 2025
Women’s Track Athlete of the Year：2024

- Night of Legends Award

Jackie Joyner-Kersee Female Athlete of the Year：2021, 2022
Most Dominant Performer Wing Award：2022, 2024

- Track & Field News Athlete of the Year

Female Athlete of the Year: 2022, 2024

- Lexington Herald-Leader Kentucky Sports Figure of the Year

Kentucky Sports Figure of the Year: 2024

== Notes ==
Records
Preceded by Dalilah Muhammad	Women's 400 m hurdles world record holder June 27, 2021 – present	Incumbent
Achievements
Preceded by Dalilah Muhammad	Women's 400 m hurdles season's best performance 2018; 2021, 2022; 2024	Succeeded by Dalilah Muhammad
Preceded by Femke Bol	Women's 400 m hurdles season's best performance 2018; 2021, 2022; 2024	Succeeded by Femke Bol
Preceded by Femke Bol	Women's 400 m hurdles season's best performance 2018; 2021, 2022; 2024	Succeeded by Femke Bol
Awards
Preceded by Candace Hill	USA Track & Field Youth Athlete of the Year; 2016	Succeeded by Jakobe Ford
Preceded by Yulimar Rojas	World Athletics Female Rising Star of the Year; 2018	Succeeded by Yaroslava Mahuchikh
Preceded by Elaine Thompson-Herah	World Athletics Female Athlete of the Year; 2022	Succeeded by Faith Kipyegon; Yulimar Rojas; Tigist Assefa
