= Gunnar Nixon =

American decathlete (born 1993)

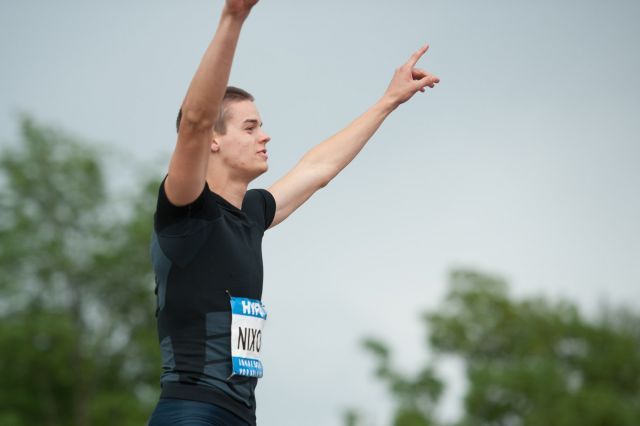
- Nixon at the Hypo-Meeting in 2013

Personal information
- Full name: James Gunnar Nixon
- Born: January 13, 1993 (age 33) Weatherford, Oklahoma, U.S.
- Height: 6 ft 4 in (193 cm)
- Weight: 175 lb (79 kg)

Sport
- Sport: Track and field
- Event: Decathlon
- College team: Arkansas Razorbacks

Achievements and titles
- Personal bests: Decathlon: 8,312 points (2013); Hepathlon: 6,232 points (2013)

James Gunnar Nixon (born January 13, 1993) is an American track and field athlete who competes in the decathlon. He broke the American high school record for the event in 2011, and was the World Junior Champion in 2012. He won his first national title indoors in 2013, and was runner-up at the 2013 USA Outdoor Track and Field Championships. His personal record for the decathlon is 8,312 points at the 2013 IAAF World Championships. In 2011, he set the United States high school national record in the decathlon (using junior implements) with a score of 8,035 points.

== Career ==
Born in Weatherford, Oklahoma, he was the fourth child of Tim and Kerri Nixon. He was raised in Tulsa until he moved to Edmond as a high school sophomore. He attended Edmond Santa Fe High School, where he started taking part in decathlon competitions and broke the national high school record with a score of 8,035 points (which brought him the Gatorade Track and Field Athlete of the Year Award in the men's section). He won at the Arcadia Invitational high school competition with a meet record of 7,573 points (with junior implements). He entered the individual high jump at the 2012 Summer Youth Olympics and placed sixth in his final. At the 2011 Pan American Junior Athletics Championships he took the silver medal in the decathlon behind American team mate Kevin Lazas.

He won an athletic scholarship to study at the University of Arkansas. In his first season for the Arkansas Razorbacks he broke the world junior record for the indoor heptathlon with a score of 6,022 points. He followed this with a runner-up finish at the Southeastern Conference indoor championships, then gained his first All-American honours with an eighth-place finish at the NCAA Indoor Championship. In the outdoor season he came third at the SEC Outdoor Championship meet then came fifth with an American junior record of 7,892 points at the NCAA Outdoor Championship. He won both the American junior title, and the gold medal at the 2012 World Junior Championships in Athletics.

Nixon started the 2013 indoor season with a heptathlon personal record of 6,232 points to win at the USA Indoor Track and Field Championships – his first national title. At the Hypo-Meeting in Europe in May he broke 8,000 points for the first time in a decathlon with senior implements, taking third place with a score of 8,136 points. Forgoing collegiate competition that year, he focused on the 2013 USA Outdoor Track and Field Championships. There he led for the first day but fell behind Ashton Eaton in the second day to close the decathlon with a personal record of 8,198 points for second place. This earned him selection for the 2013 World Championships in Athletics.

== Fall 2013 ==
Joined Coach Jeremy Fischer and Craig Poole at USA Olympic Training Center in Chula Vista, California. Coach Art Venegas will assist in the throws.

== Personal bests ==
Information from World Athletics profile unless otherwise noted.

Outdoor

Individual events
Event	Performance	Location	Date
Long jump	7.42 m (24 ft 4 in)	Ardmore	May 13, 2011
High jump	2.08 m (6 ft 9 3/4 in)	Ardmore	May 13, 2011
100 meters	10.85 (−0.3 m/s)	Atlanta	May 17, 2013
300 meters hurdles	36.93	Oklahoma City	May 17, 2011
Shot put	14.39 m (47 ft 2 1/2 in)	Chula Vista	June 17, 2013
Discus throw	43.32 m (142 ft 1 1/2 in)	Chula Vista	April 24, 2014

Combined events
Event	Performance	Location	Date	Score
Decathlon	—N/a	Moscow	August 10–11, 2013	8,312 points
100 meters	10.80 (+1.0 m/s)	Des Moines	June 21, 2013	906 points
Long jump	7.80 m (25 ft 7 in) (+0.4 m/s)	Moscow	August 10, 2013	1,010 points
Shot put	15.03 m (49 ft 3 1/2 in)	Santa Barbara	April 4, 2014	792 points
High jump	2.17 m (7 ft 1 1/4 in)	Bloomington	June 15, 2012	963 points
400 meters	48.37	Arcadia	April 8, 2011	931 points
110 meters hurdles	14.34 (+0.9 m/s)	Bloomington	June 16, 2012	931 points
Discus throw	42.38 m (139 ft 1/2 in)	Moscow	August 11, 2013	713 points
Pole vault	4.70 m (15 ft 5 in)	Salzburg	May 24, 2014	819 points
Javelin throw	60.44 m (198 ft 3 1/2 in)	Des Moines	June 22, 2013	744 points
1500 meters	4:22.36	Barcelona	July 11, 2012	796 points
Virtual Best Performance				8,565 points

Indoor

Individual events
Event	Performance	Location	Date
60 meters hurdles	8.09	Nampa	February 1, 2014
High jump	2.12 m (6 ft 11 1/4 in)	Fayetteville	January 13, 2012
Pole vault	4.45 m (14 ft 7 in)	Fayetteville	January 6, 2012
Shot put	13.67 m (44 ft 10 in)	Fayetteville	January 6, 2012

Combined events
Event	Performance	Location	Date	Score
Heptathlon	—N/a	Albuquerque	March 1–2, 2013	6,232 points
60 meters	6.86	Albuquerque	March 1, 2013	933 points
Long jump	7.53 m (24 ft 8 1/4 in)	Fayetteville	January 27, 2012	942 points
Shot put	14.42 m (47 ft 3 1/2 in)	Birmingham	February 7, 2014	754 points
High jump	2.15 m (7 ft 1/2 in)	Fayetteville	January 27, 2012	944 points
60 meters hurdles	7.93	Albuquerque	March 2, 2013	999 points
Pole vault	4.80 m (15 ft 8 3/4 in)	Albuquerque	March 2, 2013	849 points
1000 meters	2:39.08	Nampa	March 10, 2012	884 points
Virtual Best Performance				6,305 points
