= Paige Sheppard =

American middle-distance runner (born 2009)

Personal information
- Nationality: United States
- Born: October 24, 2009 (age 16)

Sport
- Sport: Athletics
- Event: middle-distance

Achievements and titles
- Personal bests: 800 m: 2:00.65 (2026); 1600 m: 4:28.77(2026); Mile: 4:33.67 (2025)

Paige Sheppard (born 24 October 2009) is an American middle-distance runner.

== Biography ==
From Hillsborough, New Jersey, Sheppard is a student at Union Catholic High School, but committed to Stanford University while in high school. She signed a Name, Image and Likeness (NIL) contract with New Balance while in high school.

As a 15 year-old, Sheppard ran 2:01.50 for the 800 metres, an American national high school sophomore class record on 8 June 2025 at the Brooks PR Invitational. She then ran 4:33.67 and won the New Balance Nationals Outdoor title in the mile run that month. The following year, she won the New Balance Nationals Indoor title over 800 metres in March 2026, also running 2:01.84 in the 800m that month. In May, she won over 800 meters at Track Night NYC in a field containing Jane Hickey and Natalie Dumas, her first race against her fellow-high school stand-out performer. In June, she ran 2:00.65 for the 800 m at the 2026 Brooks PR Invitational. Sheppard won the 800 metres final at the 2026 USATF U20 Championships on 19 June 2026, running 2:01.76. Shepphard was a finalist over 800 metres at the senior 2026 USA Championships in New York in July, running 2:00.99 in her semi-final.
