= Union Catholic Regional High School =

Private school in Union County, New Jersey, US

Union Catholic High School

Location
- 1600 Martine Avenue; Scotch Plains, Union County, New Jersey 07076; United States; 40°37′31″N 74°21′29″W

Information
- Type: Private
- Motto: Quality education in a faith-based environment
- Religious affiliation: Catholic
- Established: 1962; 64 years ago
- Oversight: Archdiocese of Newark
- CEEB code: 311362
- NCES School ID: 00863431
- Principal: James T. Reagan Jr.
- Faculty: 55.5 FTEs
- Grades: 9–12
- Gender: Co-educational
- Enrollment: 530 (as of 2023–24)
- Student to teacher ratio: 9.5:1
- Colors: Blue; Silver and white
- Athletics conference: Union County Interscholastic Athletic Conference
- Team name: Vikings
- Accreditation: Middle States Association of Colleges and Schools
- Newspaper: The Prophet
- Yearbook: Momentum
- School fees: $500
- Tuition: $22,740 (2025–26)
- Website: www.unioncatholic.org

Union Catholic Regional High School is a private Catholic high school located in Scotch Plains, in Union County, in the U.S. state of New Jersey. Its motto promises to provide a "quality education in a faith-based environment." Founded in 1962 as separate schools for boys and girls, each with its own separate administration and faculty, it has been coeducational since a merger of the two schools in 1980. The school is an active participant in the Anytime/Anywhere learning program. Students from three counties attend the school. The school operates under the auspices of the Archdiocese of Newark.

As of the 2023–24 school year, the school had an enrollment of 530 students and 55.5 classroom teachers (on an FTE basis), for a student–teacher ratio of 9.5:1.

The school has been accredited by the Middle States Association of Colleges and Schools Commission on Elementary and Secondary Schools since November 1969; the school's accreditation expires in May 2023.

== History ==
The first phase of a facility that would cost $3 million (equivalent to $31.9 million in 2025) to construct and could accommodate 1,500 students opened in September 1962 with an inaugural class of 148 girls and 142 boys. When it was established by the Newark Diocese in 1962, the genders were separated, with the Marist Brothers running the school for boys and the Dominican Sisters the school for girls. The two schools were consolidated in 1982.

== Academics ==
=== Requirements for graduation ===
A minimum of 124 Credits is required for graduation and is distributed as follows: English, 20; US History, 10; World History, 5; Lab Sciences, 10; Mathematics, 15; World Language, 10; Phys. Ed., 8, and Religion, a passing grade each year.

=== Course levels ===
Union Catholic offers many classes at a variety of levels that range from easy to difficult. Levels include Basic, Regular Adapted, Regular, Honors, Accelerated, and Advanced Placement (AP).

Advanced Placement courses are offered in AP Art History, AP Biology, AP Chemistry, AP English Language and Composition, AP English Literature and Composition, AP Environmental Science, AP United States History, AP United States Government and Politics, AP European History, AP Calculus, AP Statistics, AP Physics B and AP Spanish Language. Accelerated and Honors courses are offered in English, History, Mathematics, World Languages and Science. Most courses available have an Honors/Accelerated/AP equivalent available for students to take provided certain prerequisites are met.

== Athletics ==
The Union Catholic High School Vikings compete in the Union County Interscholastic Athletic Conference, which is comprised of public and private high schools in Union County and was established following a reorganization of sports leagues in Northern New Jersey by the New Jersey State Interscholastic Athletic Association (NJSIAA). Prior to the NJSIAA's 2009 realignment, the school had participated in the Mountain Valley Conference, which included public and private high schools in Essex, Somerset and Union counties. With 614 students in grades 10–12, the school was classified by the NJSIAA for the 2019–20 school year as Non-Public A for most athletic competition purposes, which included schools with an enrollment of 381–1,454 students in that grade range (equivalent to Group I for public schools). Dave Luciano is the athletic director.

The girls' swimming team won the Girls Division B state title in 1980–1982.

The 1984 baseball team finished the season with a 20–3 record after winning the Non-Public Group A state championship, defeating Holy Spirit High School by a score of 8–1 in the tournament final.

The girls' basketball team won the Non-Public Group A state championship in 1987 (against McCorristin Catholic High School), 1988 (vs. Notre Dame High School) and 1989 (vs. Paul VI High School). The 1987 team won the Parochial A state title after defeating McCorristin by a score of 45–42 in the championship game.

The 1987 boys basketball team finished the season with a 25–2 record after winning the Non-Public Group A state championship with a 44–39 victory against runner-up Christian Brothers Academy in the playoff finals.

The girls' volleyball team won the 2005 Non-Public state championship with a win over Lacordaire Academy in the tournament final (25-21, 19–25, 25–22). The win marks the school's first ever state championship.

The boys' 4 × 200 m relay placed first with a time of 1:28.81 at the National Scholastic Indoor Championships in New York City, on March 16, 2008. The boys' 800m sprint medley relay team took first place at the Nike Outdoor National Championship held on June 18, 2008. Their time of 1:31.72 broke the school's record and placed them #7 in New Jersey records.

The boys' track team won the indoor relay Non-Public Group B state championship in 2013, the Non-Public A title in 2014, and the Non-Public B title in 2023-2026. The girls' team won the Non-Public A title in 2015–2020 and 2022-2026; The program's eleven state group titles are tied for the most in the state and the eleven consecutive titles (there was no competition in 2021) is the longest in state history.

The boys' track team won the Non-Public Group A spring / outdoor track state championship in 2013–2015, 2022, 2024, and 2026.

The girls' spring / outdoor track team won the Non-Public Group A state championship in 2015–2019, 2021-2026; the eleven titles are tied for third-most in the state and the streak of eleven consecutive titles (there was no competition in 2020) is the longest in state history.

The girls' track team won the winter / indoor track Non-Public A state championship in 2015-2020, 2022-2026. The program's eleven state group titles are tied for second-most in the state.

The girls' cross country team won the Non-Public Group A state championship in 2015, 2017 and 2021-2025. The five consecutive state championships are tied for third-most in the state.

Union Catholic student Sydney McLaughlin, class of 2017, qualified for the 2016 Summer Olympics in Rio de Janeiro in the women's 400-meter hurdles and won the gold medal in the event in 2020, setting the world record in the event.

At the 2026 New Balance Nationals Indoor, Union Catholic's Girls Distance Medley Relay won the championship event and set a national record of 11:06:13.

== Performing Arts Company ==
The Union Catholic Performing Arts Company (UCPAC) showcases professional theatre on a high school level. The company celebrated their 25th anniversary in 2006 with their fall comedy: and their spring musical: Sugar which is based on the 1959 film Some Like It Hot. Some of their past plays include: Arsenic and Old Lace, Fools, and Inspecting Carol. Some of their past musicals might include: Pippin, A Funny Thing Happened on the Way to the Forum, Honk!, and Seussical. In 2007 the fall comedy was The Musical Comedy Murders of 1940, and the spring musical production was Joseph and the Amazing Technicolor Dreamcoat. The 2008-2009 UCPAC Season presented the play Incorruptible by Michael Hollinger in the Fall and the musical Into the Woods by Stephen Sondheim in the spring. The summer production Love (Awkwardly) was performed on the Union Catholic stage during the Summer of 2009. It then moved to NYC Off-Broadway at the end of the summer. Due to critical acclaim, it returned to NYC in January 2010. In the 2009–10 school year, UCPAC presented Noises Off and Les Misérables. The 10–11 season showed The Nerd and The Drowsy Chaperone. In the 2011-12 year, UCPAC presented The Miss Firecracker Contest and Zombie Prom. The 2012–2013 season showcased Stepping Out and Legally Blonde. The 14–15 season performed Boeing-Boeing in the fall and Hairspray in the spring. The 15–16 season performed The Cripple of Inishmaan in the fall and Bring It On in the spring. The 16–17 season showcased Rumors in the fall and In The Heights in the spring. The 17–18 season consisted of Peter and the Starcatcher for the fall play and The Mystery of Edwin Drood as the spring musical. The 18–19 season consisted of A Flea in Her Ear and Spamalot. The 2019-20 year featured Clue on Stage and Mamma Mia!. the 2021-22 year featured You Can't Take It with You (play) and Jesus Christ Superstar. The 2022-23 year featured Snow Angel (play) and Something Rotten!. The 2023-24 year featured A Midsummer Night's Dream and Emma! A Pop Musical. The 2024-2025 season showcased "The Crucible" and "The Drowsy Chaperone". The 2025-2026 PAC season presented "Is He Dead?" and "Godspell".

== Notable alumni ==
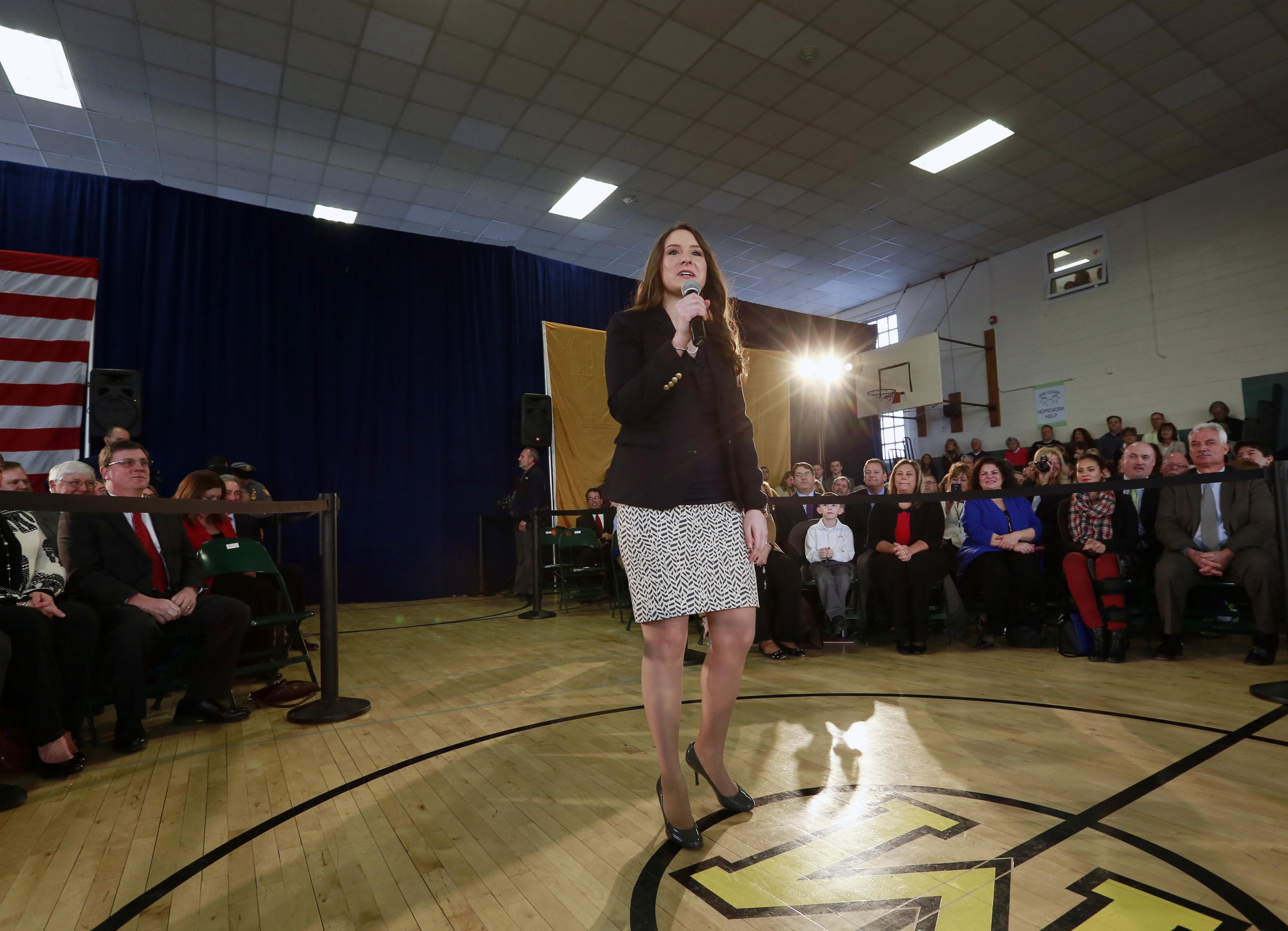
Mayor Victoria Napolitano (Class of 2006) addresses the crowd at a town hall meeting

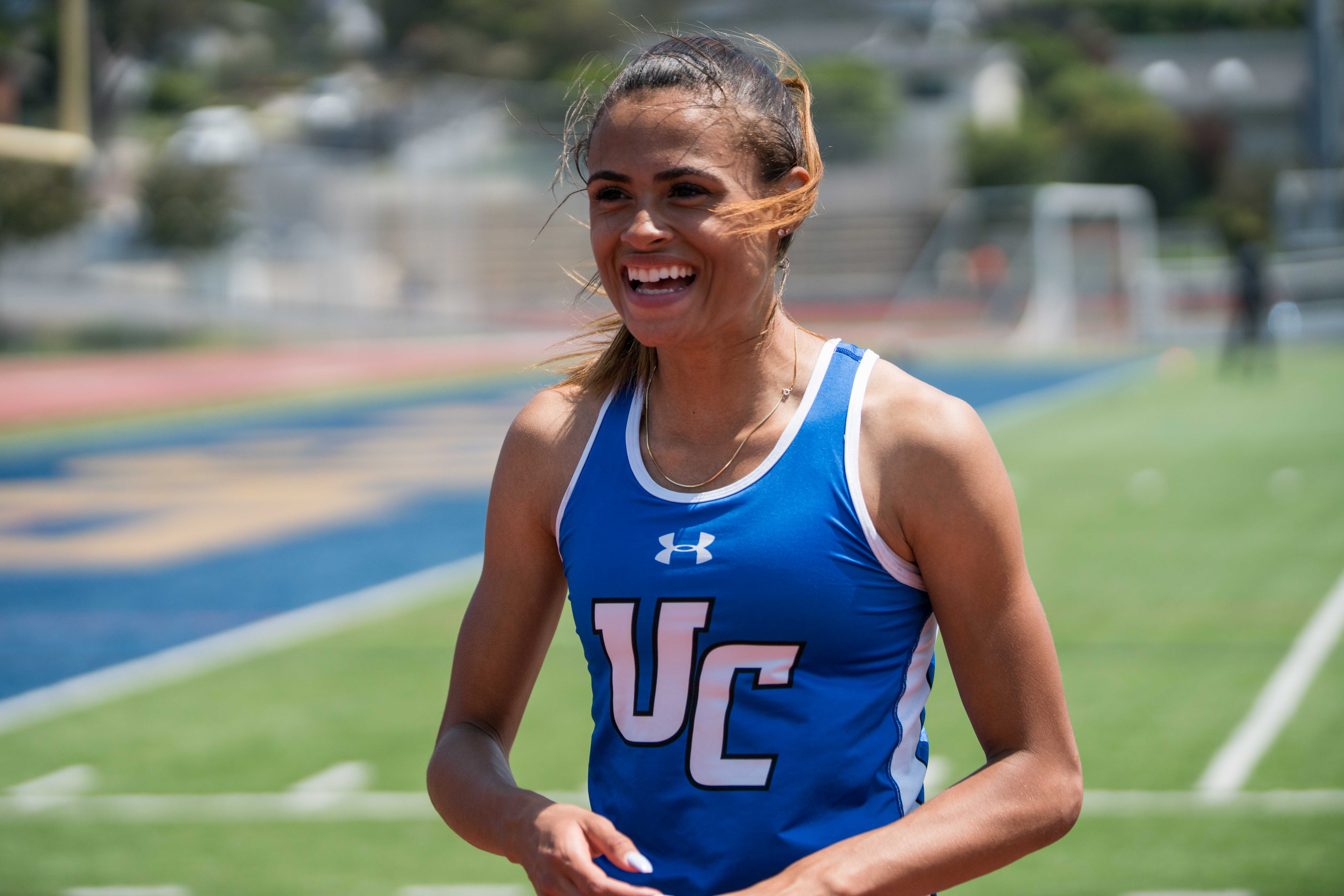
Sydney McLaughlin (Class of 2017) smiles in her Union Catholic track uniform

- Devine Eke (born 1996), professional basketball player who has played for ASC Ville de Dakar of the Nationale 1 and the Basketball Africa League
- Tate George (born 1968), point guard who played in the NBA for the New Jersey Nets and the Milwaukee Bucks
- Isaiah Hill (born 2002), model and actor, known for his role as Jace Carson in the Apple TV+ series Swagger, a character loosely based on Kevin Durant
- Bill Hynes (born 1972, class of 1990), professional auto racing driver and entrepreneur
- R. J. Kizer (1952–2026), film director and editor
- Kyle Lofton (born 1999), college basketball player for the St. Bonaventure Bonnies
- Damon Lynn (born 1995, class of 2013), college basketball player for the NJIT Highlanders
- Sydney McLaughlin-Levrone (born 1999 née McLaughlin, class of 2017), hurdler and sprinter who is a four-time Olympic gold medalist and holds the world record in the women's 400-meter hurdles
- Victoria Napolitano (born 1988 née Spellman, class of 2006), politician and former mayor of Moorestown Township who became the youngest woman to hold the office statewide at age 26
- George Papas (born 1998), professional basketball player for Olympiacos of the Greek Basket League and the EuroLeague
- Fabiana Pierre-Louis (born 1980, class of 1998), Associate Justice on the New Jersey Supreme Court since 2020
- Mike Seamon (born 1988), soccer midfielder who has played for the Seattle Sounders FC and the Pittsburgh Riverhounds
- Thomas Chatterton Williams (born 1981), cultural critic and author
- Bob Wischusen (born 1971, class of 1989), sportscaster who is a college football and basketball voice for ESPN and ESPN International, the radio voice for the New York Jets
