= Cuthbertson High School =

American public school in North Carolina

Location
- 1400 Cuthbertson Road; Waxhaw, North Carolina 28173; United States; 34°58′30″N 80°44′20″W

Information
- School type: Public
- Established: 2009 (17 years ago)
- School district: Union County Public Schools
- CEEB code: 344197
- Principal: Jeffery Stout
- Teaching staff: 81.62 (FTE)
- Grades: 9–12
- Enrollment: 1,857 (2024–2025)
- Student to teacher ratio: 22.75
- Schedule type: 4-period block schedule
- Colors: Navy and gold
- Athletics: NCHSAA 7A
- Athletics conference: Southern Carolina 6A/7A
- Mascot: Cavalier
- Website: chs.ucpsnc.org

Cuthbertson High School is a moderately sized high school in Waxhaw, North Carolina a part of Union County Public Schools. It was founded in August, 2009 under the administration of the then principal, Robert Jackson. The school was founded by pulling students from other area high schools including Parkwood High School, Marvin Ridge High School and Weddington High School. Its main feeder schools are New Town Elementary and Kensington Elementary. Cuthbertson High School is a recognized Honor School of Excellence in North Carolina. Honors for Cuthbertson High School include NC Accountability Model: Exceeded Growth, Graduation Rates: 98.5% for 2017–18 and UCPS International School: 2010; 2011; 2012; 2013; 2014; 2015

The current principal is Jeffery Stout.

== Education ==
The school offers a wide range of classes at Honors and AP level. Advanced courses are offered in the areas of English, Math, Science, Social Studies, World Language, and Career and Technical Education, the Arts, and Physical Education. Eighth grade students also have the option of participating in the Career and College program. Cuthbertson's partnership with South Piedmont Community College offers college level courses through the program. Juniors and seniors have the opportunity to take community college classes through this dual enrollment program. The school also offers several classes based on global affairs and foreign language courses in German, Spanish, Chinese, French.

== Extracurricular activities ==
Cuthbertson High School has several social, athletic and fine arts organizations. These include three concert bands, the ‘Mighty Marching Cavalier’ marching band, jazz band, indoor percussion and winter guard units, and a rock band.

== Athletics ==
Cuthbertson is a member of the North Carolina High School Athletic Association (NCHSAA) and are classified as a 7A school. The school is a part of the Southern Carolina 6A/7A Conference. Cuthbertson's school colors are navy and gold, and its team name is the Cavaliers.

Cuthbertson has many varsity and junior varsity sports during the fall, winter and spring seasons. These include cheerleading, cross country, dance team, football, golf, soccer, tennis, volleyball, basketball, swimming, indoor track & field, wrestling, baseball, lacrosse, softball and outdoor track & field.

NCHSAA State Championships
Sport	Year(s)
Women's Cross Country	2018 (3A), 2019 (3A), 2020–21 (3A), 2021 (4A), 2022 (4A)
Men's Soccer	2012 (2A)
Women's Soccer	2011 (2A)
Men's Indoor Track & Field	2022 (4A), 2023 (4A)
Women's Indoor Track & Field	2017 (3A), 2018 (3A), 2019 (3A), 2020 (3A), 2022 (4A), 2023 (4A), 2024 (4A)
Men's Outdoor Track & Field	2021 (3A), 2022 (4A)
Women's Outdoor Track & Field	2021 (3A), 2022 (4A), 2023 (4A)
