= New Balance Nationals Indoor =

American high school athletics competition

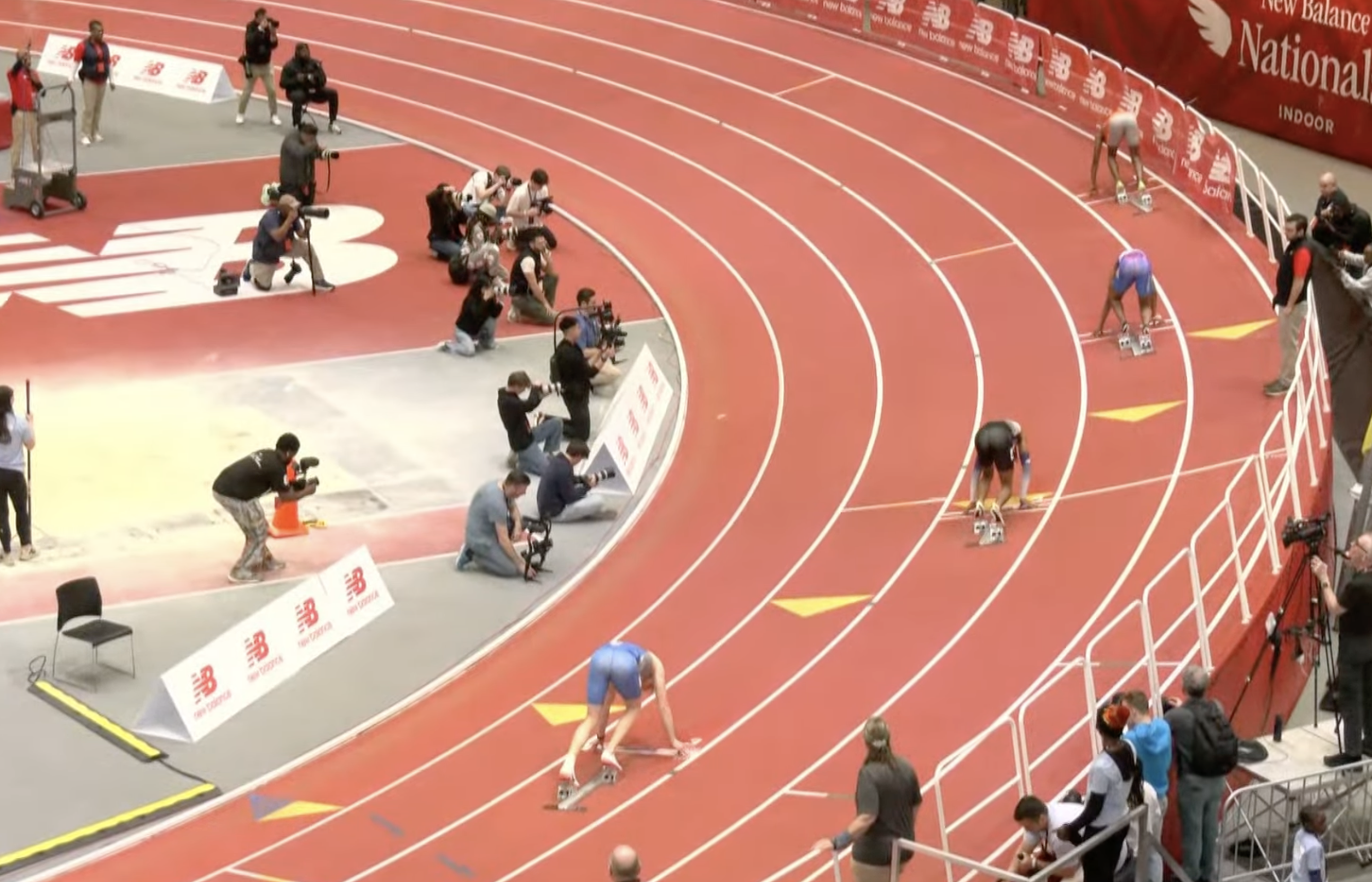
- Genre: Indoor Track & Field
- Frequency: Annually
- Venue: The Track at New Balance
- Location: Boston, Massachusetts
- Country: United States
- Years active: 2023-
- Sponsors: New Balance

New Balance Nationals Indoor (NBNI), formerly known as the National Scholastic Indoor Championships (NSIC), are one of two American high school national championship indoor track and field meets, along with Nike Indoor Nationals. High school participants from across the country compete for the honor of being named NSIC high school All-America. The championships are hosted at the Reggie Lewis Track and Athletic Center and The Track at New Balance in Boston, Massachusetts.

== Events ==
In its most recent iteration, the following running events were contested at the championships:

- 60 metres dash
- 60 metres hurdles
- 200 metres dash
- 400 metres dash
- 800 metres run
- One-mile run
- Two-mile run
- 5000 metres run
- One mile race walk
- Freshman mile run
- 7-8th grader 400m run
- 7-8th grader one mile run

The following relays were also contested:

- 4 × 200 m Relay
- 4 × 400 m Relay
- 4 × 800 m Relay
- 4 × Mile Relay
- Sprint Medley Relay
- Distance Medley Relay
- Shuttle Hurdles Relay

The following field events were contested at the most recent iteration of the NBNI:

- High jump
- Long jump
- Triple jump
- Pole vault
- Shot put
- Weight throw
- Indoor pentathlon

== Meet records ==
=== Men ===
Event	Record	Athlete	School	Date	Ref.
60 m					
4 × 400 m relay	3:09.44	Cameron Homer; Alexander Lambert; Colin Abrams; Quincy Wilson	Bullis School	16 March 2025	

=== Women ===
Event	Record	Athlete	School	Date	Ref.
60 m					
4 × 400 m relay	3:35.54	Kennedy Brown (55.57); Chrishell Campbell (53.31); Morgan Rothwell (53.70); Sydney Sutton (52.96)	Bullis School	16 March 2025	
