= 2019 USATF U20 Outdoor Championships =

- Dates: June 21–23
- Host city: Miramar, Florida, United States
- Venue: Ansin Sports Complex
- Level: Junior
- Type: Outdoor
- Events: 40 (men: 20; women: 20)

The 2019 USATF U20 Outdoor Championships was the 48th edition of the annual national championship in outdoor track and field for American athletes aged under 20, organized by USA Track & Field. The three-day competition took place on June 21–23 in at the Ansin Sports Complex in Miramar, Florida. It was the fifth time that the event was held in Florida, the previous occasion being in 1994.

== Qualification ==
To enter an event at the national competition, athletes must achieve the event's entry standard performance. The qualifying period for performances runs from Friday, June 15, 2018 to Sunday, June 16, 2019 for all events, except race walk. The race walk qualifying window closes a week earlier on Sunday June 9, 2019.

Entry standards
Men Standard	Field Size & Rounds	Event	Women Standard
10.54*	(16–2)	100m	11.70*
21.20*	(18–2)	200m	24.00*
47.44*	(18–2)	400m	54.00*
1:51.54*	(18–2)	800m	2:10.00*
3:53.44**; 4:12.14** ( 4:10.64 )**	(24–2)	1500m 1600; Mile	4:32.00**; 4:54.15** (4:53.00) **
14:40.00**	(16–1)	5000m	17:30.00**
32:05.00**	(16–1)	10000m	
55:15**	(12–1)	10000m RW	59:45
14.20*	(16-2)	110m/100m Hurdles	14.04*
53.54*	(16-1) (18–2)	400m Hurdles	61.34*
9:32.00**; 9:11.00** (3200 m)	(16–1)	3000m SC	11:00.14**
2.09 m (6 ft 10 1/4 in)	(16–1)	High Jump	1.75 m (5 ft 8 3/4 in)
5.08 m (16 ft 8 in)	(16–1)	Pole Vault	4.05 m (13 ft 3 1/4 in)
7.30 m (23 ft 11 1/4 in)	(16–1)	Long Jump	6.00 m (19 ft 8 in)
14.40 m (47 ft 2 3/4 in)	(16-1)	Triple Jump	12.40 m (40 ft 8 in)
18.25 m (59 ft 10 1/2 in) 6 kg 18.89 m (61 ft 11 1/2 in) 12 lbs 16.85 m (55 ft 3 1/4 in) 16 lbs	(16-1)	Shot Put	14.45 m (47 ft 4 3/4 in) 4 kg
54.86 m (179 ft 11 3/4 in) 1.75 kg 51.52 m (169 ft 1/4 in) 2.00 kg 58.82 m (192 ft 11 1/2 in) 1.6 kg	(16–1)	Discus Throw	49.00 m (160 ft 9 in) 1 kg
59.00 m (193 ft 6 3/4 in) 6 kg 62.18 m (204 ft 0 in) 12 lbs 56.08 m (183 ft 11 3/4 in) 16 lbs	(16-1)	Hammer Throw	54.00 m (177 ft 1 3/4 in) 4.00 kg
58.22 m (191 ft 0 in) 800 grams (1.76 lb)	(16-1)	Javelin Throw	46.50 m (152 ft 6 1/2 in) 600 grams (1.32 lb)
6,700 points	(16)	Decathlon / Heptathlon	4950 points

== Results ==
Results Taken from AdkinsTrak Timing Associates

=== Men's track ===
Event	Gold		Silver		Bronze	
100 meters	Matthew Boling	10.15	Justin Ofotan	10.21	Arian Smith	10.36
200 meters	Matthew Boling	20.36	Kennedy Lightner	20.59	Quincy Mitchell Jr	20.84
400 meters	Justin Robinson	45.59	Trey Johnson	46.41	Frederick Lewis	46.66
800 meters	James Olivier	1:50.67	Darius Kipyego	1:51.26	Jonah Hoey	1:51.72
1500 meters	Jason Gomez	4:25.83	Drew Maher	4:26.04	Devin Pancake	4:30.11
5000 meters	Grant Gardner	14:42.47	Adam Dayani	14:54.54	CarLee Stimpfel	14:57.68
10,000 meters	Daniel Kilrea	31:38.85	Nicholas Yanek	31:59.89	Ian Vickstrom	32:21.810
110 m hurdles	Tai Brown	13.204	Eric Edwards Jr	13.209	Jamar Marshall Jr	13.22
400 m hurdles	James Smith	50.29	Cass Elliot	51.30	Ryan Fields	51.88
3000 m steeplechase	Alex Slenning	9:04.57	Benjamin Nibbelink	9:07.66	Matthew Carmody	9:16.20
10 kilometers walk	Jordan Crawford	53:40.03	Samuel Allen	54:08.19	Jacob Lawson	56:43.45

=== Men's field ===
Event	Gold		Silver		Bronze	
High jump	Dontavious Hill	2.13m	Jeremy Cody	2.08m	Charles McBride II	2.08m
Pole vault	Branson Ellis	5.25m	Max Manson	5.15m	Andrew Ference	5.00m
Long jump	Phillip Austin III	7.74m	A'nan Bridgett	7.74m	Matthew Boling	7.71m
Triple jump	Treyvon Ferguson	16.13m	Justin Forde	16.10m	Jamar Davis	15.49m
Shot put	Otito Ogbonnia	21.42m	Joshua Sobota	20.88m	Jamir Gibson	19.01m
Discus throw	Zach Gehm	60.31m	Joshua Sobota	57.76m	Otito Ogbonnia	56.90m
Hammer throw	Joseph Benedetto	66.99m	Garrett Doyle	64.73m	Max Mckhann	61.87m
Javelin throw	Marc Anthony Minich	77.15	Tzuriel Pedigo	76.14	Nickolas Mirabelli	69.38
Decathlon	Corbett Fong	6766	Jett Kinder	6512	Carl Omohundroo III	6244

=== Women's track ===
Event	Gold		Silver		Bronze	
100 meters	Brandee Presley	11.19	Thelma Davies	11.25	Semira Killebrew	11.31
200 meters	Lanae-Tava Thomas	22.64	Jayda Eckford	22.72	Caisja Chandler	23.07
400 meters	Kayla Davis	51.28	Alexis Holmes	51.52	Ziyah Holman	52.12
800 meters	Athing Mu	2:05.59	Roisin Willis	2:06.99	Morgan Foster	2:07.75
1500 meters	Samantha Corman	4:29.81	Rachel Hickey	4:30.93	Meghan Underwood	4:31.20
3000 meters	Marlee Starliper	9:29.39	Ariana Gardizy	9:41.15	Katherine Thronson	9:51.23
5000 meters	Jessica Larson	16:47.66	Heidi Nielson	16:54.02	Emma Wilson	17:04.54
100 m hurdles	Jasmine Jones	13.19	Masai Russell	13.42	Rayniah Jones	13.50
400 m hurdles	Britton Wilson	56.36	Masai Russell	56.78	Vanessa Watson	57.84
3000 m steeplechase	Lydia Olivere	10:33.08	Megan Worrel	10:36.14	Katie Dammer	10:47.66
10 kilometers walk	Taylor Ewert	48:24.61	Grace Endy	56:21.52	Chloe Engin	1:02:14.44

=== Women's field ===
Event	Gold		Silver		Bronze	
High jump	Shelby Tyler	1.83m	Sanaa Barnes	1.80m	Madison Schmidt	1.80m
Pole vault	Nastassja Campbell	4.10m	Hayley Horvath	4.10m	Julia Fixsen	3.95m
Long jump	Claire Bryant	6.12m	Ijeyikowoicho Onah	5.89m	Tosin Alao	5.83m
Triple jump	Trentorria Green	12.77m	Kali Hatcher	12.70m	Christina Warren	12.66m
Shot put	Patience Marshall	16.05m	Tedreauna Britt	15.56m	Shelby Bigsby	15.40m
Discus throw	Tedreauna Britt	54.01m	Veronica Fraley	51.15m	Chelsea Wallace	50.89m
Hammer throw	Hawa Mahama	65.66m	Shelby Moran	58.47m	Amanda Howe	57.10m
Javelin throw	Ava Curry	48.89m	Skylar Ciccolini	48.15m	Sydney Juszczyk	47.07m
Heptathlon	Anna Hall	5646	Timara Chapman	5383	Jadin O'Brien	5167

== Pan American U20 team selection ==
The event served as the selection meet for the United States team for the 2019 Pan American U20 Athletics Championships. In order to be entered, athletes needed to finish in the first two of their event at the national meet and also achieve an international qualifying standard mark. The United States team, as managed by USATF, can also bring a qualified back up athlete in case one of the team members is unable to perform.
