= Matthew Boling =

American track and field athlete (born 2000)

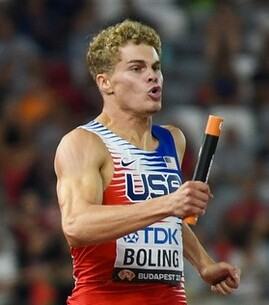
- Boling competed in the mixed 4 × 400 m relay at the 2023 World Athletics Championships

Personal information
- Born: June 20, 2000 (age 26) Houston, Texas, U.S.
- Height: 6 ft 0 in (183 cm)

Sport
- Sport: Track and field
- Events: Sprints; Long jump; Relays
- College team: Georgia Bulldogs
- Coached by: Caryl Smith-Gilbert

Achievements and titles
- Personal bests: Outdoor; 100 m: 9.98 (2022); 200 m: 19.92 (2022); 400 m: 44.84 (2024); Long jump: 8.02 m (26 ft 3 1/2 in) (2021); Indoor; 60 m: 6.56 (2022); 200 m: 20.12 (2023); 400 m: 45.51 (2021); Long jump: 8.25 m (27 ft 3/4 in) (2022)
Medal record
Men's athletics
Representing the United States
World Championships
Gold medal – first place	2023 Budapest	4 × 400 m relay
Gold medal – first place	2023 Budapest	4 × 400 m mixed
World Athletics Relays
Gold medal – first place	2024 Nassau	4 × 400 m relay
World U20 Championships
Silver medal – second place	2018 Tampere	4 × 400 m relay
Pan American U20 Championships
Gold medal – first place	2019 San José	100 m
Gold medal – first place	2019 San José	200 m
Gold medal – first place	2019 San José	4 × 100 m relay
Gold medal – first place	2019 San José	4 × 400 m relay
- Updated on August 19, 2023; 2 years ago

Matthew Boling (born June 20, 2000) is an American track and field athlete specializing in the sprints and long jump. He won four gold medals at the 2019 Pan American U20 Championships in the 100 m, 200 m, 4 × 100 m relay and 4 × 400 m relay, and helped set world under-20 records in both of the relay races for the United States. He also ran in the semi-final for the American 4 × 400 m relay team at the 2018 World U20 Championships that went on to earn silver in the final. Boling would later go on to win a gold medal at the 2023 World Athletics Championships in the mixed 4 × 400 m relay, and would help set a world record for the event in the process.

Boling gained national attention during the spring of 2019 for his accomplishments in high school track and field. In March, he leaped the farthest in the long jump for a high school athlete in ten years with a 26-foot-3.5-inch (8.014 m) mark at the Texas Relays, and then bested the high school all-conditions 100 m record, breaking the 10-second barrier with a wind-assisted 9.98 seconds run on April 27, 2019. Boling finished his high school track career in May at the Texas state championships by running a 44.74 second anchor in the 4 × 400 m relay for the Strake Jesuit Crusaders, coming from behind to win in the fastest time for a high school team in the nation that year (3:10.56).

== Early life ==
Matthew Boling was born to Mark and Monique Boling on June 20, 2000, with a twin brother, Michael. They grew up in Houston, Texas, and attended River Oaks Baptist School, where Matthew began running track. The two then began attending Strake Jesuit College Preparatory. Initially, Matthew competed in the high jump, then began focusing on the long jump and the 400 m. At the 2018 IAAF World U20 Championships, Boling ran the opening leg for the USA's 4 × 400 m relay team, which went on to get the silver medal in the final. In November that year, he committed to the University of Georgia.

== Breakthrough ==
Boling went viral in 2019 when he broke the 10-second barrier with a wind-aided (+4.2 m/s) time of 9.98 seconds on April 27, 2019, setting the high school all-conditions record in the 100 m. He subsequently took on the nickname White Lightning, which was a reference to his race and to his speed, although Boling himself publicly stated he disliked attention being called to his race. He also long jumped 26 ft 3 in (8.00 m) at the Texas Relays, the furthest jump for a high school athlete in 10 years. He won both events at the Texas UIL 6A State Championships, setting the wind-legal US high school record of 10.13 seconds in the 100 m, and anchored Strake Jesuit to 3rd in the 4 × 100 m. He went viral once again in the 4 × 400 m when he split 44.74 seconds on his anchor leg to bring Strake Jesuit a win from over 20 m behind.

After winning the 100 m and 200 m at the USA U20 Championships, Boling turned the double at the 2019 Pan American U20 Athletics Championships in San José, Costa Rica. Both times (10.11 and 20.31, respectively) were personal bests, and his 100 m time of 10.11 was also a championship record. He then ran the 4th and 2nd legs for the USA's 4 × 100 m and 4 × 400 m teams, respectively, both setting World U20 records. For his performances, Gatorade awarded Boling its National Boys Track & Field Player of the Year honors for 2018–19, and he was named the 2019 High School Boys Athlete Of The Year by Track & Field News.

== Collegiate career ==
=== 2020 ===
Before his first season at Georgia was cut short by the COVID-19 pandemic, Boling attempted the 60 m, 200 m, Long Jump and the 4 × 400 m indoors. At the SEC Indoor Championships, Boling finished second overall in the 200 m with 20.71 seconds, losing to Terrance Laird of LSU from the first section.

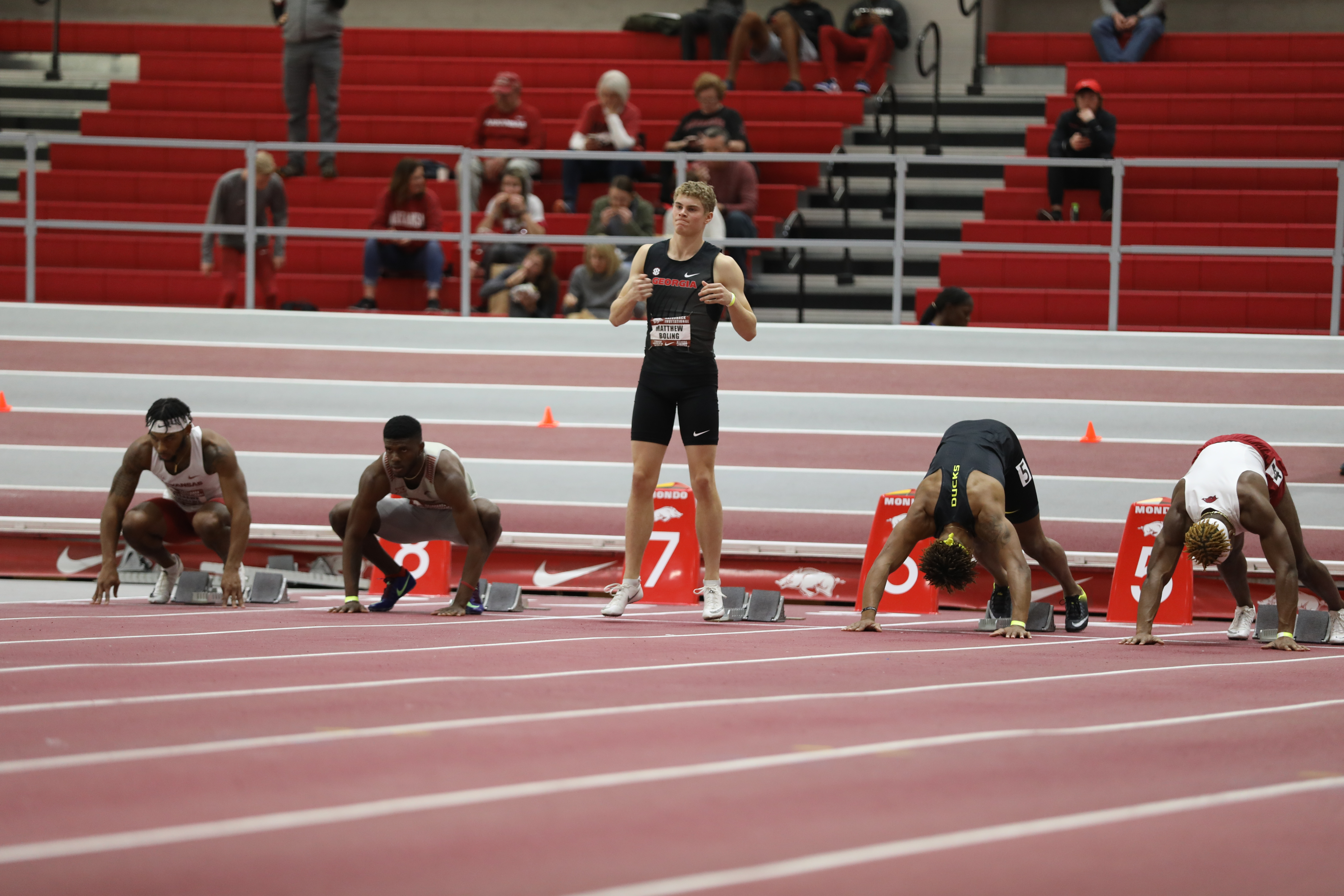
Boling stands before entering the starting blocks.

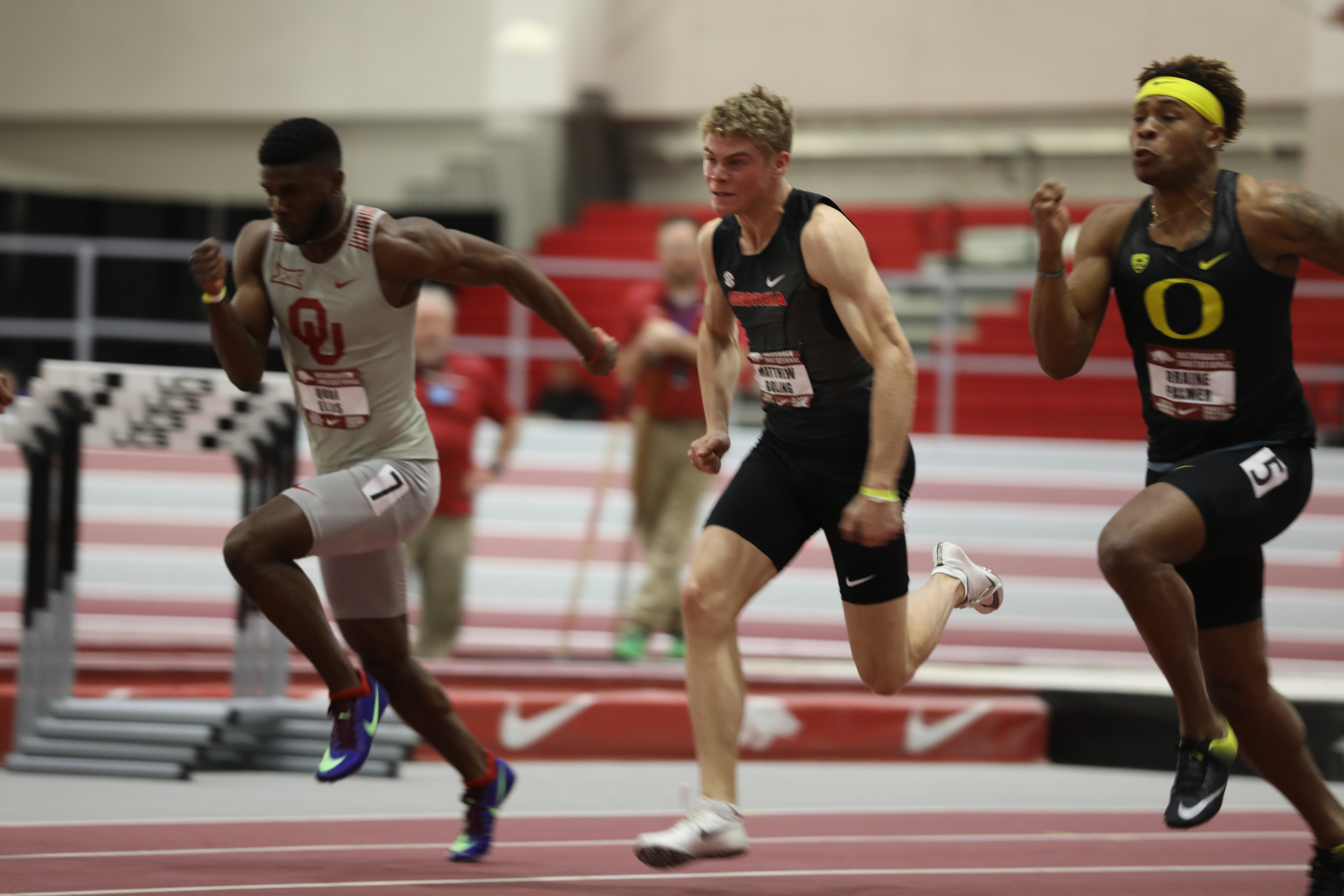
Boling (center) sprinting

Boling representing the Georgia Bulldogs at the Arkansas Invite in 2020.

=== 2021 ===
Returning to track, Boling again tried each event and chose to focus on the 200 m for the indoor season. At the SEC Championships, he was disqualified in the final for stepping out of his lane on the final turn, and Laird took the title. However, because he ranked high enough by running 20.37 in his preliminary, he qualified for his first NCAA Indoor Championships, where he would win the 200 m indoor NCAA national title. Boling clocked a 20.19, the joint-sixth fastest time in history.

Laird and Boling's rivalry was set to grow in the outdoor season with the addition of the 100 m and 4 × 100 m. At the SEC Outdoor Championships, Laird won the 100 m/200 m double, while Boling finished 2nd and 3rd, respectively. His time of 20.06 seconds was a personal best in the 200 m. Boling ran the anchor for Georgia's 4 × 100 m, with a slight lead but was caught by Laird and finished 2nd. At the NCAA Outdoor Championships at Hayward Field in Eugene, Oregon, Boling finished 6th and 5th in the 100 m and 200 m, respectively. Boling was considered a Freshman in 2021 by many, due to COVID-19 causing a short season his Freshman year.

Boling stayed in Eugene for the US Olympic Trials, where he finished 14th overall in the 100 m semis and 9th overall in the 200 m semis, bringing his first complete College season and first Olympic tryout to an end.

=== 2022 ===
At the 2022 SEC Outdoor Track & Field Championships, Boling placed 4th in the 100 m in a time of 10.13 and won the 200 m with the time of 20.01. At the 2022 NCAA Division I Outdoor Track and Field Championships, Boling placed 6th in the 100 m with a time of 10.18 and finished 2nd in the 200 m in a time of 20.13.

=== 2023 ===
Boling ran the third leg of the mixed 4 × 400 m relay at the 2023 World Athletics Championships in Budapest. His team set a world record of 3:08.80 and finished first. In September, he decided to forgo his remaining year of eligibility in the NCAA to turn professional. In an interview, he reflected on his decision, citing his desire to compete on the world stage: "The atmosphere around a world championship and global meets is different. I felt so in the zone."

== Professional career ==
=== 2024 ===
At the 2024 World Athletics Indoor Championships, Boling was a member of the US team for the 4 × 400 m relay, earning a silver medal.

In the 2024 US Olympic Qualifying Trials Boling made the finals in the 400 m, finishing in 8th place. In the 200 m, he did not qualify for the finals, ultimately recording the 9th fastest time. Needing a top 3 event finish, Boling failed to automatically qualify for the 2024 Olympics and was not selected for a relay team.

== Statistics ==
- Information from World Athletics profile unless otherwise noted.

=== Personal records ===
Event	Time / Mark	Wind (m/s)	Venue	Date	Notes
60 m	6.56	—N/a	College Station, Texas, U.S.	February 25, 2022	Indoor 60 m
100 m	9.98	+1.6	Gainesville, Florida, U.S.	April 16, 2022	
100 m	9.97 w	+4.2	College Station, Texas, U.S.	May 15, 2021	Wind-assisted
200 m	19.92	-0.9	Atlanta, Georgia, U.S.	April 23, 2022	
Indoor 200 m	20.12	—N/a	, Albuquerque, New Mexico, U.S.	March 11, 2023	#6 all-time, NCAA Division I champion
400 m	44.84	—N/a	Gainesville, Florida, U.S.	July 19, 2024	
Indoor 400 m	45.51	—N/a	Columbia, South Carolina, U.S.	January 23, 2021	
400 m (relay split)	44.5	—N/a	San José, Costa Rica	July 21, 2019	
Long jump	8.02 m (26 ft 3 1/2 in)	+1.4	Athens, Georgia, U.S.	April 9, 2021	
Indoor long jump	8.25 m (27 ft 3/4 in)	—N/a	Clemson, South Carolina, U.S.	January 14, 2022	

=== International competitions ===
Representing the United States
Year	Competition	Position	Event	Time	Wind (m/s)	Venue	Notes
2018	World U20 Championships	1st (semi 3)	4 × 400 m relay	3:05.57	—N/a	Tampere, Finland	WU20L, Q (Note: The team with Boling qualified for the final, but he did not run with the team in the final; However, the team that ran in the final finished 2nd, so Boling earned a silver medal for his contribution.)
2019	Pan American U20 Championships	1st	100 m	10.11	+0.5	San José, Costa Rica	PB
2019	Pan American U20 Championships	1st	200 m	20.31	-0.8	San José, Costa Rica	WU20L, PB
2019	Pan American U20 Championships	1st	4 × 100 m relay	38.62	—N/a	San José, Costa Rica	WU20R (Note: Shared with Arian Smith, Justin Ofotan, and Marcellus Moore for the United States.)
2019	Pan American U20 Championships	1st	4 × 400 m relay	2:59.30	—N/a	San José, Costa Rica	WU20R (Note: Shared with Frederick Lewis, Matthew Moorer, and Justin Robinson for the United States.)
2023	World Athletics Championships	H1 1st	4 × 400 m relay	2:58.47		Budapest, Hungary	
2023	World Athletics Championships	1st	Mixed 4 × 400 m Relay	3:08.80		Budapest, Hungary	WR

=== National championships ===
Representing the Strake Jesuit Crusaders (2018–2019) and Georgia Bulldogs (2021)
Year	Competition	Position	Event	Time / Mark	Wind (m/s)	Venue	Notes
2018	U.S. U20 Championships	6th	Long jump	23' 11.5"(7.30 m)	-1.0	Bloomington, Indiana	
2018	U.S. U20 Championships	6th	400 m	46.59	—N/a	Bloomington, Indiana	
2019	U.S. U20 Championships	1st	100 m	10.15 w	+2.3	Miramar, Florida	Wind-assisted
2019	U.S. U20 Championships	3rd	Long jump	25' 3.5" (7.71 m)	+1.9	Miramar, Florida	
2019	U.S. U20 Championships	1st	200 m	20.36	+0.7	Miramar, Florida	PB
2021	NCAA Division I Indoor Championships	7th	Long jump	25' 5.25" (7.75 m)	—N/a	Fayetteville, Arkansas	
2021	NCAA Division I Indoor Championships	1st	200 m	20.19	—N/a	Fayetteville, Arkansas	WL
2021	NCAA Division I Indoor Championships	4th	4 × 400 m	3:04.84	—N/a	Fayetteville, Arkansas	
2021	NCAA Division I Championships	2nd	4 × 100 m relay	38.54	—N/a	Eugene, Oregon	
2021	NCAA Division I Championships	6th	100 m	10.19	+0.4	Eugene, Oregon	
2021	NCAA Division I Championships	5th	200 m	20.48	-0.4	Eugene, Oregon	
2021	U.S. Olympic Trials	14th	100 m	10.22	+0.7	Eugene, Oregon	
2021	U.S. Olympic Trials	9th	200 m	20.27	+0.9	Eugene, Oregon	
2022	NCAA Division I Indoor Championships	5th	60 m	6.63		Birmingham, Alabama	
2022	NCAA Division I Indoor Championships	DQ	200 m	20.76		Birmingham, Alabama	
2022	NCAA Division I Indoor Championships	3rd	Long Jump	7.86		Birmingham, Alabama	
2022	NCAA Division I Indoor Championships	4th	4 × 400 m	3:05.46		Birmingham, Alabama	
2022	NCAA Division I Championships	6th	100 m	10.18	+0.6	Eugene, Oregon	
2022	NCAA Division I Championships	2nd	200 m	20.13	+0.6	Eugene, Oregon	
2022	NCAA Division I Championships	SF2 3rd	4 × 400 m	3:03.73		Eugene, Oregon	
2022	USATF National Championships	12th	Long Jump	7.78	+0.6	Eugene, Oregon	
2022	USATF National Championships	6th	200 m	20.15	-0.3	Eugene, Oregon	
2023	NCAA Division I Indoor Championships	1st	200 m	20.12		Albuquerque, New Mexico	
2023	NCAA Division I Indoor Championships	2nd	4 × 400 m	3:03.10		Albuquerque, New Mexico	
2023	NCAA Division I Championships	SF2 4th	200 m	20.25	+0.6	Austin, Texas	
2023	NCAA Division I Championships	SF2 3rd	4 × 100 m	38.62		Austin, Texas	
2023	NCAA Division I Championships	7th	4 × 400 m	3:03.22		Austin, Texas	
2023	USATF National Championships	6th	400 m	45.17		Eugene, Oregon	

- NCAA results from Track & Field Results Reporting System.

=== Circuit performances ===
Grand Slam Track results
Slam	Race group	Event	Pl.	Time	Prize money
2025 Philadelphia Slam	Long sprints	400 m	5th	45.21	US$12,500
2025 Philadelphia Slam	Long sprints	200 m	7th	20.87	US$12,500

=== Track records ===
As of September 2024, Boling holds the following track records for 100 metres and 200 metres.

==== 100 metres ====
Location	Time	Windspeed m/s	Date
Webster	9.97	+4.2	27/04/2019

==== 200 metres ====
Location	Time	Windspeed m/s	Date
Oxford, Mississippi	20.01	+0.3	14/05/2022

== Notes ==
Awards
Preceded by Armand Duplantis	Track & Field News High School Boys Athlete of the Year; 2019	Succeeded by Hobbs Kessler
