= Semira Killebrew =

American athlete (born 2001)

Personal information
- Born: 30 March 2001 (age 25)

Sport
- Sport: Athletics
- Event: Sprint

Achievements and titles
- Personal bests: 60m: 7.16s (Boston, 2024); 100 m: 10.96s (London, 2025); 200m: 23.29s (Windsor, 2025)
Medal record
Women's athletics
Representing the United States
Pan American U20 Championships
Gold medal – first place	2019 San José	4 × 100m relay

Semira Killebrew (born 30 March 2001) is an American sprinter.

== Early life ==
She was raised in Pike Township, before later moving to Washington Township, Marion County, Indiana, and attended Brebeuf Jesuit Preparatory School in Indianapolis. She was born to Toni and Rico, her father was a multisport athlete at collegiate level. She has four brothers, one of whom, Aaron, was an American football player at Indiana State University. She participated in gymnastics and soccer whilst growing up before focusing on athletics. She joined Indiana Storm track club where she was a teammate of Lynna Irby.

== Early career ==
In 2018, she won her first state title in Indiana over 100 meters, and recorded outdoor personal records of 11.55 seconds for the 100m and 23.73 seconds for the 200 metres. That year, at the National Junior Olympic Track and Field Championships, she had a second-place finish in the 17–18-year-old women's 200 metres in a time of 23.73, before returning to win the 100 metres national age-group title in a wind-legal 11.59 seconds.

She set an Indiana state sprinting record in 2019 when she ran the 100m in 11.24 seconds at the Brooks PR Invitational in Seattle. That year, she finished third in the 100 metres at the USATF U20 champsionahips, earning herself a spot on the women's 4x100 relay team for the 2019 Pan American U20 Athletics Championships in Costa Rica, winning the gold medal alongside Thelma Davies, Caisja Chandler and Brandee Presley.

== NCAA ==
In 2019, she committed to join the University of Florida under coach Mike Holloway. In 2021, she finished third in the 60m in 7.21 seconds at the SEC Indoor Championships. The following year, she placed sixth over 60m at the NCAA Indoor Championships. Whilst ranked in the top-ten college sprinters she entered the transfer portal. Competing for Texas A&M University she broke the programme record for the 60 metres at the 2024 NCAA Indoor Championships, running 7.16 seconds.

== Professional career ==
She was a semi-finalist at the US Olympic trials in June 2024 over 100 metres in Eugene, Oregon.

She finished fifth in the women's 60 metres at the 2025 USATF Indoor Championships in New York in February 2025. On 22 June 2025, she ran a personal best with a time of 10.99s (+1.2 m/s) in the women's 100m at the Bob Vigars Classic in Ontario. She reached the semi-finals of the 100 metres at the 2025 USA Outdoor Track and Field Championships, running her heat in 11.28 seconds (+1.8 m/s).

Killebrew opened her 2026 indoor season running 7.31 seconds for the 60 metres to finish runner-up to training partner Dina Asher Smith at the Corky Classic. In May, she ran at the 2026 World Athletics Relays in the women's 4 × 100 metres relay in Gaborone, Botswana.

== Personal life ==
Of short stature, standing at five foot tall, she has said she has taken inspiration from fellow-diminutive sprinter Shelly-Ann Fraser-Pryce.
