= 2020 USATF U20 Outdoor Championships =

- Dates: June 12–14
- Host city: Miramar, Florida, United States
- Venue: Ansin Sports Complex
- Level: Under-20
- Type: Outdoor
- Events: 40 (men: 20; women: 20)

The 2020 USATF U20 Outdoor Championships will be the 49th edition of the annual national championship in outdoor track and field for American athletes aged under 20, organized by USA Track & Field. The three-day competition will take place on June 12–14 at the Ansin Sports Complex in Miramar, Florida. The Ansin Sports Complex will host the event for the second year in a row. It will be the sixth time the meet has been held in Florida. Update: This competition was cancelled due to the Corona Virus pandemic.

== Qualification ==
To enter an event at the national competition, athletes must achieve the event's entry standard performance.

Entry standards
Men Standard	Field Size	Rounds	Event	Women Standard
10.58*	16	2	100 m	11.85*
21.38*	18	2	200 m	24.35*
47.44*	18	2	400 m	54.85*
1:51.54*	18	2	800 m	2:09.00*
3:53.44**; 4:12.14** ( 4:10.64 )**	24	2	1500 m Mile; 1600 m	4:32.00**; 4:54.15** (4:53.00) **
14:40.00**	16	1	5000 m	17:00.00**
32:05.00**	16	1	10,000 m/ 3000 m	10:00.00**; 3200m(10:44.00)
55:15**	12	1	10,000 m race walk	59:45
14.15*	16	2	110 m/100 m hurdles	13.80*
53.54*	16 (men); 18 (women)	1 (men); 2 (women)	400 m hurdles	61.00*
9:32.00**; 9:11.00** (3200 m	16	1	3000 m steeplechase	11:00.14**
2.09 m (6 ft 10 1/4 in)	16	1	High jump	1.75 m (5 ft 8 3/4 in)
5.09 m (16 ft 8 1/4 in)	16	1	Pole vault	4.07 m (13 ft 4 in)
7.30 m (23 ft 11 1/4 in)	16	1	Long jump	6.10 m (20 ft 0 in)
14.40 m (47 ft 2 3/4 in)	16	1	Triple jump	12.45 m (40 ft 10 in)
18.25 m (59 ft 10 1/2 in) 6 kg (13 lb)	16	1	Shot put	14.50 m (47 ft 6 3/4 in) 4 kg (8.8 lb)
54.86 m (179 ft 11 3/4 in) 1.75 kg (3.9 lb); 51.52 m (169 ft 1/4 in) 2.00 kg 58.82 m (192 ft 11 1/2 in) 1.6 kg	16	1	Discus throw	49.00 m (160 ft 9 in) 1 kg (2.2 lb)
59.00 m (193 ft 6 3/4 in) 6 kg (13 lb); 62.18 m (204 ft 0 in) 12 lbs 56.08 m (183 ft 11 3/4 in) 16 lbs	16	1	Hammer throw	54.00 m (177 ft 1 3/4 in) 4 kg (8.8 lb)
58.22 m (191 ft 0 in) 0.8 kg (1.8 lb)	16	1	Javelin throw	45.50 m (149 ft 3 1/4 in) 0.6 kg (1.3 lb)
6,700 points	16	—	Decathlon /Heptathlon	4950 points

- * = only performances measured by fully automatic timing (FAT) are accepted
- ** = Hand-timed performances may be accepted where no FAT time has been recorded by an athlete and are only measured to a tenth of a second.

== Men's results ==
=== Men track events ===
Event	Gold	Silver	Bronze
100 meters			
200 meters			
400 meters			
800 meters			
1500 meters			
5000 meters			
10,000 meters			
110 m hurdles			
400 m hurdles			
3000 m steeplechase			
10 kilometers walk			

=== Men field events ===
Event	Gold	Silver	Bronze
High jump	0.00 m (0 in)	0.00 m (0 in)	0.00 m (0 in)
Pole vault	0.00 m (0 in)	0.00 m (0 in)	0.00 m (0 in)
Long jump	0.00 m (0 in)	0.00 m (0 in)	0.00 m (0 in)
Triple jump	0.00 m (0 in)	0.00 m (0 in)	0.00 m (0 in)
Shot put	0.00 m (0 in)	0.00 m (0 in)	0.00 m (0 in)
Discus throw	0.00 m (0 ft 0 in)	0.00 m (0 ft 0 in)	0.00 m (0 ft 0 in)
Hammer throw	0.00 m (0 ft 0 in)	0.00 m (0 ft 0 in)	0.00 m (0 ft 0 in)
Javelin throw	0.00 m (0 ft 0 in)	0.00 m (0 ft 0 in)	0.00 m (0 ft 0 in)
Decathlon			

== Women's results ==
=== Women track events ===
Event	Gold	Silver	Bronze
100 meters			
200 meters			
400 meters			
800 meters			
1500 meters			
5000 meters			
100 m hurdles			
400 m hurdles			
3000 m steeplechase			
10 kilometers walk			

=== Women field events ===
Event	Gold	Silver	Bronze
High jump	0.00 m (0 in)	0.00 m (0 in)	0.00 m (0 in)
Pole vault	0.00 m (0 in)	0.00 m (0 in)	0.00 m (0 in)
Long jump	0.00 m (0 in)	0.00 m (0 in)	0.00 m (0 in)
Triple jump	0.00 m (0 in)	0.00 m (0 in)	0.00 m (0 in)
Shot put	0.00 m (0 in)	0.00 m (0 in)	0.00 m (0 in)
Discus throw	0.00 m (0 ft 0 in)	0.00 m (0 ft 0 in)	0.00 m (0 ft 0 in)
Hammer throw	0.00 m (0 ft 0 in)	0.00 m (0 ft 0 in)	0.00 m (0 ft 0 in)
Javelin throw	0.00 m (0 ft 0 in)	0.00 m (0 ft 0 in)	0.00 m (0 ft 0 in)
Heptathlon			

== World U20 team selection ==
The event will serve as the selection meet for the United States team for the 2020 World Athletics U20 Championships. In order to be selected for the national team, athletes must place in the top two of their event at the national competition and also need to achieve the international qualifying standard mark. The United States team, as managed by USA Track & Field, can also bring a qualified back up athlete in case one of the team members is unable to perform.
