= Rohan Watson =

Jamaican athlete

- Watson at the 2026 Commonwealth Games

Personal information
- Nationality: Jamaican
- Born: 29 April 2002 (age 24)

Sport
- Sport: Athletics
- Event: Sprint
- Club: MVP Track Club

Achievements and titles
- Personal bests: 60m: 6.50 (Spanish Town, 2025); 100m: 9.91 (Kingston, 2023); 200m: 21.69 (Kingston, 2022)
Medal record
Men's athletics
Representing Jamaica
World Championships
Bronze medal – third place	2023 Budapest	4×100 m relay

Rohan Watson (born 29 April 2002) is a Jamaican track and field athlete who competes as a sprinter. In July 2023, he became Jamaican national champion over 100 metres.

== Biography ==
Watson is a member of the MVP Club in Jamaica, where he is a training partner of Shericka Jackson. Watson won the Jamaican national 100m title at the National Stadium in Kingston, Jamaica on 7 July 2023, running 9.91 seconds. The victory was considered an upset, with Oblique Seville and Ackeem Blake entering the competition as the favourites. Earlier in the week, Watson had dipped below the 10-second barrier for the first time, running 9.98s in the heats.

He was selected for the 2023 World Athletics Championships in Budapest in August 2023, where he reached the semi-finals of the 100m.

In January 2025, he set a 60 metres personal best of 6.61 seconds at the Central Hurdles, Relays & Field Events Meet at the GC Foster College in St. Catherine. This was recorded into a -2.1 m/s headwind. He set a new personal best of 6.60 for the 60 metres at the Gibson McCook Relays on 22 February 2025, at the National Stadium in Kingston. On 1 March 2025, he won the 60 metres final at the Jamaican World Athletics Indoor Championships qualifier at GC Foster College with a new personal best 6.50 seconds, just ahead of Nishion Ebanks. He was named in the Jamaican team for the 2025 World Athletics Indoor Championships in Nanjing in March 2025, where he finished in fifth place in the final of the 60 metres race with a time of 6.59 seconds. He finished ninth in the 100 metres at the 2025 Xiamen Diamond League event in China, in April 2025. He finished sixth in the 100 metres at the 2025 Shanghai Diamond League event in China on 3 May 2025, in a new seasons best time of 10.18 seconds.

He competed at the 2025 World Athletics Relays in China in the Men's 4 × 100 metres relay in May 2025.

He finished fifth in the final of the 100 metres at the 2025 Jamaican Athletics Championships, in a time of 10.04 seconds. He was named in the Jamaican squad for the 2025 NACAC Championships in Nassau, The Bahamas.

Watson was named in the Jamaica squad for the 2026 World Athletics Relays in Gaborone, Botswana, running on the opening day in the men's 4 x 100 metres alongside Adrian Kerr, Odaine McPherson, and Rasheed Foster. He competed in the 100 metres at the 2026 Commonwealth Games in Glasgow, Scotland, reaching the semi-finals. He also ran in the men's 4 × 100 m relay.
