= 10-second barrier =

100-meter sprint milestone

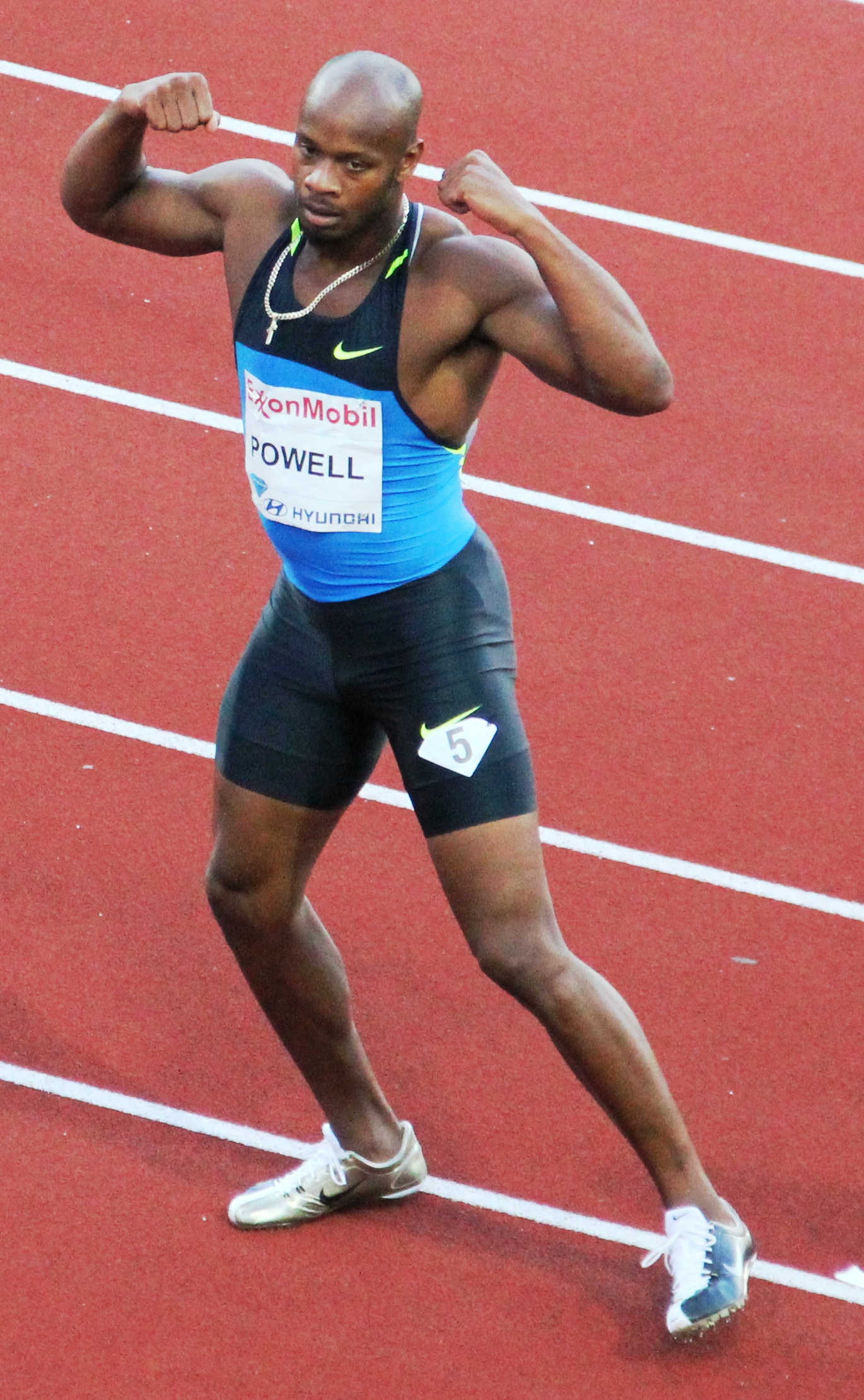
Asafa Powell broke the 10-second barrier more times than any other sprinter in the history of track and field—97 times

The 10-second barrier is the physical and psychological barrier of completing the 100-meter sprint in under ten seconds. The achievement is traditionally regarded as the hallmark of a world-class male sprinter. Its significance has become less important since the late 1990s, as an increasing number of runners have surpassed the ten seconds mark. The current men's world record holder is Usain Bolt, who clocked a time of 9.58 seconds at the IAAF World Championships in Berlin on 16 August 2009.

Jim Hines was the first person to ever officially run the 100 metres under 10 seconds at the 1968 Mexico City Olympics. The fastest non-winning sub-10 performance was by Tyson Gay who clocked 9.71 in 2009 as a runner-up. The only quadragenarian to have run a sub-10 is Kim Collins who ran his personal best time of 9.93 in 2016 at 40 years old, earning him the nickname Ageless Wonder. Justin Gatlin chronologically held the longest streak of sub-10 performances in history, having a sub-10 career in a time-span of nearly 18 years, from his first sub-10 clocking in 2003, to the final one in 2021. In 2025, Akani Simbine became the first athlete in history to run the 100 metres in under 10 seconds in eleven consecutive seasons—a streak he extended to twelve seasons by 2026. That surpassed the previous record of ten, held by Bolt. The highest number of 100-meter sprint races that an individual has completed in under 10 seconds in competition is 97. Asafa Powell achieved this total between 12 June 2004 and 1 September 2016.

== History ==
For sprints, World Athletics (formerly known as IAAF) maintains that world records and other recognised performances require: a wind assistance of not more than 2.0 metres per second (4.5 miles per hour) in the direction of travel; fully automatic timing (FAT) to one hundredth of a second; and no use of performance-enhancing substances.^{[8]} Wind gauge malfunctions or infractions may invalidate a sprinter's time.^{[9]}

=== Hand timing ===
Prior to 1977, FAT was not required for IAAF official timings. Times were recorded manually to one tenth of a second; three official timers with stopwatches noted when the starting gun flashed and when the runner crossed the finish line, and their median recorded time was the official mark. Some races also had an unofficial FAT, or semi-automatic time, often in conjunction with photo finish equipment. The first person timed at under ten seconds was Bob Hayes, who ran 9.9 seconds at the Mt. SAC Relays in April 1963, but with a tailwind of 5.0 m/s (11.2 mph). Hayes clocked another illegal 9.9 (wind 5.3 m/s (11.9 mph)) in the semi-final of the 1964 Olympic 100 metres, with the first sub-10 FAT of 9.91 seconds. In the final, Hayes' official tenths time of 10.0 seconds was calculated by rounding down the FAT of 10.06 seconds; the backup hand-timers recorded 9.8, 9.9, and 9.9, which would have given 9.9 as the official time if the FAT had malfunctioned. At the 1968 USA Outdoor Track and Field Championships at Charles C. Hughes Stadium in Sacramento, California, three men ran legal hand-timed 9.9 seconds: Jim Hines first and Ronnie Ray Smith second in the first semi-final, and Charlie Greene first in the second semi-final. This was dubbed the "Night of Speed", and all three were recognised as world records by the IAAF. The IAAF lists their FATs as: Hines 10.03, Smith 10.14 and Greene 10.10; although Time magazine reported at the time that "an automatic Bulova Accutron Phototimer confirmed that all three had indeed broken [10.0]". Hines also had a wind-assisted 9.8 seconds in the heats. On 14 October 1968, Hines went on to win the Olympic final in 9.9 seconds, rounded down from his FAT of 9.95, making it the first non-wind-assisted electronic sub-10-second performance. By 1976, six other men had equalled the 9.9 hand-timed record, though none of their performances had an FAT mark.

=== Automatic timing ===
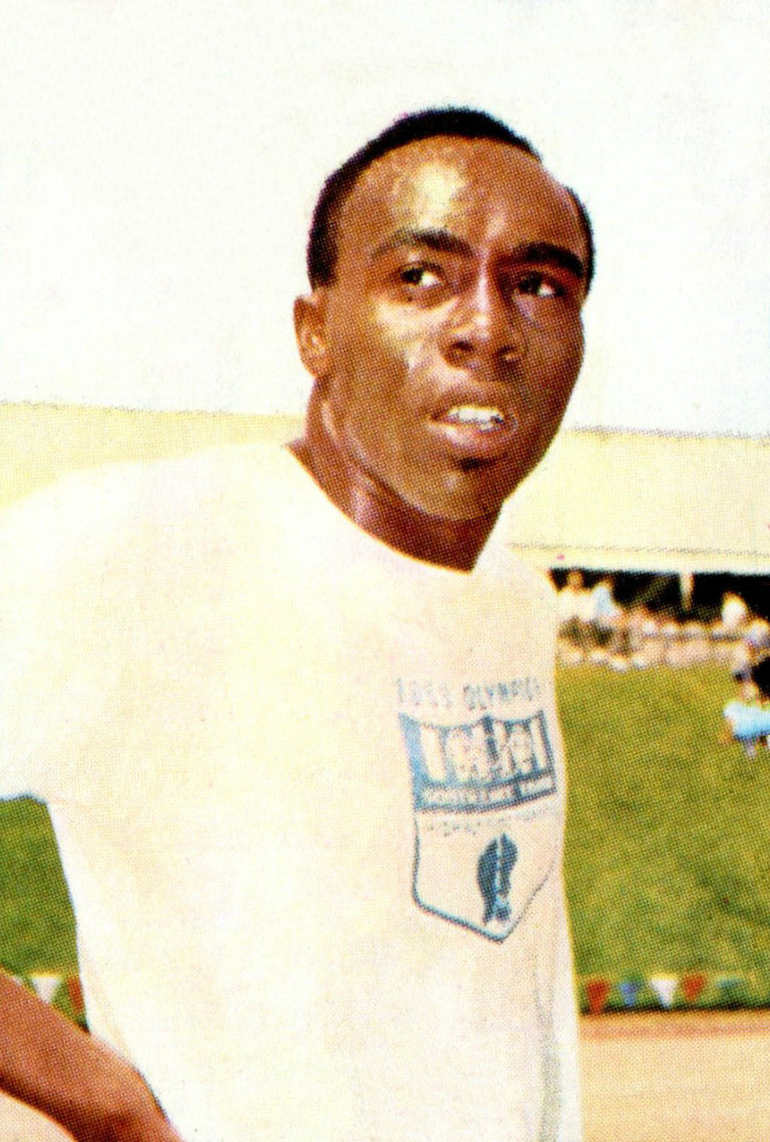
Jim Hines was the first man to officially break the 10-second barrier

After the 1977 rule change, Jim Hines' nine-year-old 9.95 was the only recognised sub-10-second race. That year the barrier was broken again, when Silvio Leonard ran 9.98 seconds in August 1977. Both of these marks were recorded at a high altitude, which aids performance due to lower air resistance.^{[7]}

Carl Lewis was the first sprinter to break ten seconds at low altitude under electronic timing, with 9.97 seconds at the Modesto Relays in May 1983. Calvin Smith recorded a world record of 9.93 seconds in Colorado Springs, Colorado in July 1983, at altitude, and became the first sprinter to run under ten seconds twice, in August that year. In total, six sprinters legally broke the barrier during the 1980s. Another, Ben Johnson, had eclipsed both the 9.90 mark in 1987 and the 9.80 mark in 1988, respectively with 9.83 seconds and 9.79 seconds; however, both of these records were rescinded after he tested positive for, and later admitted to, using doping, namely steroids.

The 100 metres final at the 1991 World Championships represented a new zenith in the event: six athletes ran under 10 seconds in the same race, and winner Carl Lewis lowered the world record to 9.86 seconds. In second place was Leroy Burrell who also broke the former world record, which had been his at 9.90 seconds. In third place, 0.01 seconds slower than the former world record, was Dennis Mitchell with a time of 9.91 seconds. In fourth place, breaking his own European record of 9.97 seconds, was Linford Christie with a time of 9.92 seconds.

Maurice Greene, in 1999, was the first athlete to run under 9.80. Usain Bolt surpassed 9.70 in 2008, and 9.60 in 2009.

The men's 100 metres final at the 2012 Summer Olympics saw a new Olympic record and seven out of eight finalists running under 10 seconds. However Tyson Gay, was later disqualified from this race. Prior to his disqualification, he had been in fourth place with a time of 9.80 seconds, the fastest fourth place in history.

In May 2016, former World Champion Kim Collins improved his personal best by running 9.93 seconds as a 40-year-old. He improved his own standing as the oldest man to break the 10-second barrier, the first over the age of 40. Omar McLeod, a specialist in the 110-meter hurdles, became the first hurdler to break the 10-second barrier in April 2016—clocking a time of 9.99 seconds.

On 4 August 2024, the final of the men's 100 metres at the 2024 Summer Olympics marked the first competitive race in history where the entire field finished in under 10 seconds, with Oblique Seville recording a time of 9.91 seconds in eighth and last place. The 2026 Kamila Skolimowska Memorial had a nine-man final, all of whom broke 10 seconds. (Eight of the nine runners in the 2021 Prefontaine Classic had broken 10 seconds wind-assisted.)

No woman has recorded an official sub-10 second time yet. The female 100-meter world record is 10.49 seconds, set by American Florence Griffith Joyner in 1988. (Note: It is widely believed that the anemometer was faulty for the race in which Florence Griffith Joyner set the official world record for the women's 100 m of 10.49 s. A 1995 report commissioned by the IAAF estimated the true wind speed was between +5.0 m/s and +7.0 m/s, rather than the ±0.0 m/s recorded. If this time, recorded in the quarter-final of the 1988 U.S. Olympic trials, were excluded, the world record would be 10.54 s, recorded by Elaine Thompson-Herah at the Prefontaine Classic meet in Eugene, Oregon on 21 August 2021.)

== Electronically timed marks ==
Sprinters who have broken the 10-second barrier without wind assistance
#	Date^{[1]}	Athlete	Time (seconds)^{[2]}	Age^{[3]}	Country^{[4]}	Continent^{[5]}	Best (year)^{[6]}	Doping case	Ref.
1	14 October 1968	Jim Hines	9.95 A^{[7]}	22 years, 34 days	United States	North America	9.95 (1968)		
2	11 August 1977	Silvio Leonard	9.98 A	21 years, 325 days	Cuba	North America	9.98 (1977)		
3	14 May 1983	Carl Lewis	9.97	21 years, 317 days	United States	North America	9.86 (1991)		
4	3 July 1983	Calvin Smith	9.93 A	22 years, 176 days	United States	North America	9.93 (1983)		
5	5 May 1984	Mel Lattany	9.96	24 years, 269 days	United States	North America	9.96 (1984)		
6^{[8]}	9 July 1986	Ben Johnson	9.95	24 years, 191 days	Canada	North America	9.95 (1986)	Yes	
7	24 September 1988	Linford Christie	9.97	28 years, 175 days	Great Britain	Europe	9.87 (1993)	Yes	
8	20 May 1989	Raymond Stewart	9.97	24 years, 63 days	Jamaica	North America	9.96 (1991)		
9	16 June 1989	Leroy Burrell	9.94	22 years, 115 days	United States	North America	9.85 (1994)		
10	25 August 1991	Dennis Mitchell	9.99	25 years, 186 days	United States	North America	9.91 (1991)	Yes	
11	25 August 1991	Frankie Fredericks	9.95	23 years, 327 days	Namibia	Africa	9.86 (1996)		
12	11 September 1991	Andre Cason	9.99	22 years, 234 days	United States	North America	9.92 (1993)		
13	4 April 1992	Olapade Adeniken	9.97	22 years, 229 days	Nigeria	Africa	9.95 (1994)		
14	18 April 1992	Michael Marsh	9.93	24 years, 258 days	United States	North America	9.93 (1992)		
15	18 April 1992	Davidson Ezinwa	9.96	20 years, 148 days	Nigeria	Africa	9.94 (1994)	Yes	
16	21 May 1993	Daniel Effiong	9.99	20 years, 338 days	Nigeria	Africa	9.98 (1993)	Yes	
17	22 July 1994	Jon Drummond	9.99	25 years, 316 days	United States	North America	9.92 (1997)		
18	22 April 1995	Donovan Bailey	9.99	27 years, 127 days	Canada	North America	9.84 (1996)		
19	15 July 1995	Bruny Surin	9.97	28 years, 3 days	Canada	North America	9.84 (1999)		
20	21 April 1996	Ato Boldon	9.93	22 years, 113 days	Trinidad and Tobago	North America	9.86 (1998)		
21	12 June 1997	Maurice Greene	9.96	22 years, 324 days	United States	North America	9.79 (1999)		
22	12 June 1997	Kareem Streete-Thompson	9.96	24 years, 74 days	United States	North America	9.96 (1997)		
23	12 June 1997	Tim Montgomery	9.96	22 years, 135 days	United States	North America	9.92 (1997)	Yes	
24	19 June 1997	Percival Spencer	9.98	22 years, 115 days	Jamaica	North America	9.98 (1997)		
25	13 July 1997	Seun Ogunkoya	9.97	19 years, 197 days	Nigeria	Africa	9.92 (1998)		
26	9 August 1998	Vincent Henderson	9.95	25 years, 293 days	United States	North America	9.95 (1998)		
27	11 September 1998	Obadele Thompson	9.87 A	22 years, 165 days	Barbados	North America	9.87 (1998)		
28	5 June 1999	Leonard Myles-Mills	9.98	25 years, 273 days	Ghana	Africa	9.98 (1999)		
29	13 June 1999	Dwain Chambers	9.99	21 years, 69 days	Great Britain	Europe	9.97 (1999)	Yes	
30	2 July 1999	Jason Gardener	9.98	23 years, 287 days	Great Britain	Europe	9.98 (1999)		
31	5 July 1999	Tim Harden	9.92	25 years, 159 days	United States	North America	9.92 (1999)		
32	2 June 2000	Coby Miller	9.98	23 years, 227 days	United States	North America	9.98 (2000)		
33	2 June 2000	Bernard Williams	9.99	22 years, 135 days	United States	North America	9.94 (2001)	Yes	
34	21 June 2000	Francis Obikwelu	9.98	21 years, 212 days	Nigeria	Africa	9.86 (2004)		
35	12 April 2002	Shawn Crawford	9.99 A	24 years, 88 days	United States	North America	9.88 (2004)	Yes	
36	21 April 2002	Joshua J. Johnson	9.95	25 years, 346 days	United States	North America	9.95 (2002)		
37	4 May 2002	Brian Lewis	9.99	27 years, 150 days	United States	North America	9.99 (2002)		
38	27 July 2002	Kim Collins	9.98	26 years, 113 days	Saint Kitts and Nevis	North America	9.93 (2016)		
39	5 May 2003	Patrick Johnson	9.93	30 years, 221 days	Australia	Oceania	9.93 (2003)		
40	19 July 2003	Deji Aliu	9.98	27 years, 239 days	Nigeria	Africa	9.95 (2003)		
41	15 August 2003	John Capel	9.97	24 years, 292 days	United States	North America	9.95 (2004)	Yes	
42	15 August 2003	Justin Gatlin	9.97	21 years, 186 days	United States	North America	9.74 (2015)	Yes	
43	15 August 2003	Mickey Grimes	9.99	26 years, 309 days	United States	North America	9.99 (2003)	Yes	
44	12 October 2003	Uchenna Emedolu	9.97	27 years, 25 days	Nigeria	Africa	9.97 (2003)		
45	12 June 2004	Asafa Powell	9.99	21 years, 202 days	Jamaica	North America	9.72 (2008)	Yes	
46	14 June 2005	Aziz Zakari	9.99	28 years, 285 days	Ghana	Africa	9.99 (2005)	Yes	
47	25 June 2005	Marc Burns	9.96	22 years, 169 days	Trinidad and Tobago	North America	9.96 (2005)		
48	25 June 2005	Darrel Brown	9.99	20 years, 257 days	Trinidad and Tobago	North America	9.99 (2005)		
49	5 July 2005	Ronald Pognon	9.99	22 years, 231 days	France	Europe	9.99 (2005)		
50	22 July 2005	Leonard Scott	9.94	25 years, 184 days	United States	North America	9.91 (2006)		
51	12 May 2006	Olusoji Fasuba	9.93	21 years, 307 days	Nigeria	Africa	9.85 (2006)		
52	25 July 2006	Tyson Gay	9.97	23 years, 350 days	United States	North America	9.69 (2009)	Yes	
53	18 August 2006	Marcus Brunson	9.99	28 years, 116 days	United States	North America	9.99 (2006)		
54	28 April 2007	Derrick Atkins	9.98	23 years, 113 days	Bahamas	North America	9.91 (2007)		
55	8 June 2007	Walter Dix	9.93	21 years, 128 days	United States	North America	9.88 (2010)		
56	26 July 2007	Samuel Francis	9.99	20 years, 121 days	Qatar	Asia	9.99 (2007)		
57	28 September 2007	Wallace Spearmon	9.96	22 years, 278 days	United States	North America	9.96 (2007)		
58	3 May 2008	Usain Bolt	9.76	21 years, 256 days	Jamaica	North America	9.58 (2009)		
59	10 May 2008	Travis Padgett	9.96	21 years, 149 days	United States	North America	9.89 (2008)		
60	18 May 2008	Richard Thompson	9.93	22 years, 346 days	Trinidad and Tobago	North America	9.82 (2014)		
61	28 June 2008	Rodney Martin	9.95	25 years, 189 days	United States	North America	9.95 (2008)		
62	28 June 2008	Mark Jelks	9.99	24 years, 79 days	United States	North America	9.99 (2008)	Yes	
63	28 June 2008	Darvis Patton	9.89	30 years, 207 days	United States	North America	9.89 (2008)		
64	28 June 2008	Ivory Williams	9.94	23 years, 57 days	United States	North America	9.93 (2009)	Yes	
65	22 July 2008	Nesta Carter	9.98	22 years, 285 days	Jamaica	North America	9.78 (2010)	Yes	
66	15 August 2008	Churandy Martina	9.99	24 years, 43 days	Netherlands Antilles	North America	9.91 (2012)		
67	16 August 2008	Michael Frater	9.97	25 years, 315 days	Jamaica	North America	9.88 (2011)		
68	24 May 2009	Daniel Bailey	9.99	22 years, 257 days	Antigua and Barbuda	North America	9.91 (2009)		
69	7 June 2009	Mike Rodgers	9.94	24 years, 44 days	United States	North America	9.85 (2011)	Yes	
70	28 August 2009	Lerone Clarke	9.99	28 years, 52 days	Jamaica	North America	9.99 (2009)		
71	8 July 2010	Yohan Blake	9.96	20 years, 194 days	Jamaica	North America	9.69 (2012)	Yes	
72	9 July 2010	Christophe Lemaitre	9.98	20 years, 28 days	France	Europe	9.92 (2011)		
73	19 August 2010	Trell Kimmons	9.95	25 years, 37 days	United States	North America	9.95 (2010)		
74	29 August 2010	Ryan Bailey	9.95	21 years, 138 days	United States	North America	9.88 (2010)	Yes	
75	29 August 2010	Mario Forsythe	9.99	24 years, 303 days	Jamaica	North America	9.95 (2010)		
76	16 April 2011	Steve Mullings	9.90	28 years, 138 days	Jamaica	North America	9.80 (2011)	Yes	
77	23 April 2011	Ngonidzashe Makusha	9.97	24 years, 43 days	Zimbabwe	Africa	9.89 (2011)		
78	4 June 2011	Nickel Ashmeade	9.96	21 years, 58 days	Jamaica	North America	9.90 (2013)		
79	4 June 2011	Keston Bledman	9.93	23 years, 88 days	Trinidad and Tobago	North America	9.86 (2012)		
80	10 June 2011	Mookie Salaam	9.97	21 years, 66 days	United States	North America	9.97 (2011)		
81	30 June 2011	Jaysuma Saidy Ndure	9.99	27 years, 180 days	Norway	Europe	9.99 (2011)		
82	6 June 2012	Harry Adams	9.96	22 years, 192 days	United States	North America	9.96 (2012)		
83	7 July 2012	Kemar Hyman	9.95	22 years, 270 days	Cayman Islands	North America	9.95 (2012)		
84	7 September 2012	Kemar Bailey-Cole	9.97	20 years, 241 days	Jamaica	North America	9.92 (2015)		
85	23 May 2013	Isiah Young	9.99	23 years, 138 days	United States	North America	9.89 (2021)		
86	5 June 2013	Dentarius Locke	9.97	23 years, 175 days	United States	North America	9.96 (2013)		
87	8 June 2013	Gabriel Mvumvure	9.98	25 years, 105 days	Zimbabwe	Africa	9.98 (2013)		
88	21 June 2013	Charles Silmon	9.98	21 years, 352 days	United States	North America	9.98 (2013)		
89	13 July 2013	James Dasaolu	9.91	25 years, 311 days	Great Britain	Europe	9.91 (2013)		
90	13 July 2013	Jimmy Vicaut	9.95	21 years, 136 days	France	Europe	9.86 (2015)		
91	12 April 2014	Simon Magakwe	9.98 A	27 years, 333 days	South Africa	Africa	9.98 (2014)	Yes	
92	17 May 2014	Kemarley Brown	9.93	21 years, 301 days	Jamaica	North America	9.93 (2014)		
93	8 June 2014	Chijindu Ujah	9.96	20 years, 95 days	Great Britain	Europe	9.96 (2014)		
94	13 June 2014	Trayvon Bromell	9.97	18 years, 338 days	United States	North America	9.76 (2021)		
95	28 September 2014	Femi Ogunode	9.93	23 years, 136 days	Qatar	Asia	9.91 (2015)	Yes	
96	8 May 2015	Clayton Vaughn	9.93	22 years, 358 days	United States	North America	9.93 (2015)		
97	17 May 2015	Andre De Grasse	9.97	20 years, 188 days	Canada	North America	9.89 (2021)		
98	16 May 2015	Bryce Robinson	9.99	21 years, 184 days	United States	North America	9.99 (2015)		
99	20 May 2015	Marvin Bracy	9.95	21 years, 156 days	United States	North America	9.85 (2021)		
100	30 May 2015	Su Bingtian	9.99	25 years, 274 days	China	Asia	9.83 (2021)		
101	7 June 2015	Adam Gemili	9.97	21 years, 244 days	Great Britain	Europe	9.97 (2015)		
102	25 June 2015	Diondre Batson	9.94	22 years, 347 days	United States	North America	9.94 (2015)		
103	25 June 2015	Beejay Lee	9.99	22 years, 112 days	United States	North America	9.99 (2015)		
104	25 June 2015	Quentin Butler	9.96	22 years, 280 days	United States	North America	9.96 (2015)		
105	1 July 2015	Akani Simbine	9.99	21 years, 283 days	South Africa	Africa	9.82 (2024)		
106	5 July 2015	Henricho Bruintjies	9.97	21 years, 354 days	South Africa	Africa	9.97 (2015)		
107	11 July 2015	Andrew Fisher	9.94	23 years, 208 days	Jamaica	North America	9.94 (2015)		
108	12 March 2016	Wayde van Niekerk	9.98 A	23 years, 241 days	South Africa	Africa	9.94 (2017)		
109	23 April 2016	Omar McLeod	9.99	21 years, 364 days	Jamaica	North America	9.99 (2016)		
110	2 June 2016	Ameer Webb	9.94	25 years, 75 days	United States	North America	9.94 (2016)		
111	6 June 2016	Ben Youssef Meïté	9.99	29 years, 208 days	Ivory Coast	Africa	9.96 (2016)		
112	8 June 2016	Senoj-Jay Givans	9.96	22 years, 161 days	Jamaica	North America	9.96 (2016)		
113	11 June 2016	Aaron Brown	9.96	24 years, 15 days	Canada	North America	9.96 (2016)		
114	12 June 2016	Jak Ali Harvey	9.92	27 years, 39 days	Turkey	Europe	9.92 (2016)		
115	24 June 2016	Rondel Sorrillo	9.99	30 years, 153 days	Trinidad and Tobago	North America	9.99 (2016)		
116	3 July 2016	Christian Coleman	9.95	20 years, 119 days	United States	North America	9.76 (2019)		
117	30 July 2016	Joel Fearon	9.96	27 years, 293 days	Great Britain	Europe	9.96 (2016)		
118	18 March 2017	Thando Roto	9.95 A	21 years, 173 days	South Africa	Africa	9.95 (2017)		
119	15 April 2017	Ronnie Baker	9.99	23 years, 182 days	United States	North America	9.83 (2021)		
120	22 April 2017	Odean Skeen	9.98	22 years, 237 days	Jamaica	North America	9.98 (2017)		
121	13 May 2017	Nethaneel Mitchell-Blake	9.99	23 years, 41 days	Great Britain	Europe	9.99 (2017)		
122	7 June 2017	Cameron Burrell	9.93	22 years, 269 days	United States	North America	9.93 (2017)		
123	7 June 2017	Christopher Belcher	9.93	23 years, 129 days	United States	North America	9.93 (2017)		
124	23 June 2017	Julian Forte	9.99	23 years, 357 days	Jamaica	North America	9.91 (2017)		
125	6 July 2017	Ramil Guliyev	9.97	27 years, 38 days	Turkey	Europe	9.97 (2017)		
126	9 September 2017	Yoshihide Kiryū	9.98	21 years, 268 days	Japan	Asia	9.98 (2017)		
127	13 May 2018	Kendal Williams	9.99	22 years, 232 days	United States	North America	9.93 (2024)		
128	25 May 2018	Jaylen Bacon	9.97	21 years, 293 days	United States	North America	9.97 (2018)		
129	25 May 2018	Andre Ewers	9.98	22 years, 352 days	Jamaica	North America	9.98 (2018)		
130	9 June 2018	Zharnel Hughes	9.91	22 years, 331 days	Great Britain	Europe	9.83 (2023)		
131	9 June 2018	Noah Lyles	9.93	20 years, 326 days	United States	North America	9.79 (2024)		
132	16 June 2018	Arthur Cissé	9.94	21 years, 169 days	Ivory Coast	Africa	9.93 (2019)		
133	19 June 2018	Xie Zhenye	9.97	24 years, 306 days	China	Asia	9.97 (2018)		
134	22 June 2018	Filippo Tortu	9.99	20 years, 7 days	Italy	Europe	9.99 (2018)		
135	9 July 2018	Barakat Al-Harthi	9.97	30 years, 24 days	Oman	Asia	9.97 (2018)	Yes	
136	21 July 2018	Tyquendo Tracey	9.96	25 years, 41 days	Jamaica	North America	9.96 (2018)		
137	7 August 2018	Reece Prescod	9.96	22 years, 160 days	Great Britain	Europe	9.93 (2022)		
138	22 February 2019	Roberto Skyers	9.98	27 years, 102 days	Cuba	North America	9.98 (2019)		
139	20 April 2019	Divine Oduduru	9.94	22 years, 195 days	Nigeria	Africa	9.86 (2019)	Yes	
140	11 May 2019	Abdul Hakim Sani Brown	9.99	20 years, 66 days	Japan	Asia	9.96 (2024)		
141	12 May 2019	Cravon Gillespie	9.97	22 years, 285 days	United States	North America	9.93 (2019)		
142	5 June 2019	Mario Burke	9.98	22 years, 79 days	Barbados	North America	9.98 (2019)		
143	20 July 2019	Yuki Koike	9.98	24 years, 68 days	Japan	Asia	9.98 (2019)		
144	27 August 2019	Raymond Ekevwo	9.96	20 years, 157 days	Nigeria	Africa	9.96 (2019)		
145	20 July 2020	Michael Norman	9.86	22 years, 230 days	United States	North America	9.86 (2020)		
146	26 March 2021	Benjamin Azamati	9.97	23 years, 71 days	Ghana	Africa	9.90 (2022)		
147	10 April 2021	Kyree King	9.97	26 years, 275 days	United States	North America	9.96 (2022)		
148	17 April 2021	Jo'Vaughn Martin	9.94	21 years, 276 days	United States	North America	9.94 (2021)		
149	24 April 2021	Fred Kerley	9.91	25 years, 352 days	United States	North America	9.76 (2022)		
150	13 May 2021	Marcell Jacobs	9.95	26 years, 229 days	Italy	Europe	9.80 (2021)		
151	14 May 2021	Gift Leotlela	9.94 A	23 years, 2 days	South Africa	Africa	9.87 (2025)		
152	6 June 2021	Ryota Yamagata	9.95	28 years, 361 days	Japan	Asia	9.95 (2021)		
153	20 June 2021	Kenny Bednarek	9.96	22 years, 249 days	United States	North America	9.79 (2025)		
154	20 June 2021	Micah Williams	9.91	19 years, 220 days	United States	North America	9.86 (2022)		
155	31 July 2021	Enoch Adegoke	9.98	21 years, 145 days	Nigeria	Africa	9.98 (2021)		
156	14 August 2021	Ferdinand Omanyala	9.96	25 years, 224 days	Kenya	Africa	9.77 (2021)		
157	16 April 2022	Matthew Boling	9.98	21 years, 300 days	United States	North America	9.98 (2022)		
158	16 April 2022	Davonte Burnett	9.99	22 years, 48 days	United States	North America	9.99 (2022)		
159	23 April 2022	Joseph Amoah	9.94	25 years, 101 days	Ghana	Africa	9.92 (2026)		
160	30 April 2022	Letsile Tebogo	9.96	18 years, 327 days	Botswana	Africa	9.86 (2024)		
161	21 May 2022	Oblique Seville	9.86	21 years, 66 days	Jamaica	North America	9.77 (2025)		
162	11 June 2022	Cravont Charleston	9.98	24 years, 160 days	United States	North America	9.90 (2023)		
163	12 June 2022	Ackeem Blake	9.95	20 years, 142 days	Jamaica	North America	9.88 (2025)		
164	24 June 2022	Elijah Hall	9.98	27 years, 306 days	United States	North America	9.90 (2022)		
165	24 June 2022	Emmanuel Matadi	9.98	31 years, 70 days	Liberia	Africa	9.91 (2024)		
166	25 June 2022	Favour Ashe	9.99	20 years, 58 days	Nigeria	Africa	9.93 (2026)		
167	3 July 2022	Yupun Abeykoon	9.96	27 years, 184 days	Sri Lanka	Asia	9.96 (2022)		
168	3 July 2022	Reynier Mena	9.99	25 years, 224 days	Cuba	North America	9.98 (2026)		
169	3 July 2022	Méba-Mickaël Zeze	9.99	28 years, 45 days	France	Europe	9.99 (2022)		
170	29 March 2023	Bouwahjgie Nkrumie	9.99	19 years, 41 days	Jamaica	North America	9.99 (2023)		
171	15 April 2023	Terrence Jones	9.91	20 years, 158 days	Bahamas	North America	9.91 (2023)		
172	15 April 2023	Joseph Fahnbulleh	9.98	21 years, 216 days	Liberia	Africa	9.98 (2023)		
173	26 May 2023	Udodi Onwuzurike	9.92	20 years, 117 days	Nigeria	Africa	9.92 (2023)		
174	7 June 2023	Pjai Austin	9.89	22 years, 261 days	United States	North America	9.89 (2023)		
175	7 June 2023	Cole Beck	9.97	24 years, 94 days	United States	North America	9.97 (2023)		
176	7 June 2023	Godson Oghenebrume	9.93	20 years, 11 days	Nigeria	Africa	9.90 (2023)		
177	7 June 2023	Shaun Maswanganyi	9.99	22 years, 126 days	South Africa	Africa	9.91 (2023)		
178	9 June 2023	Courtney Lindsey	9.89	24 years, 203 days	United States	North America	9.82 (2025)		
179	9 June 2023	Da'Marcus Fleming	9.97	21 years, 170 days	United States	North America	9.97 (2023)		
180	16 June 2023	Eugene Amo-Dadzie	9.93	30 years, 359 days	Great Britain	Europe	9.87 (2025)		
181	2 July 2023	Emmanuel Eseme	9.96	29 years, 319 days	Cameroon	Africa	9.83 (2026)		
182	6 July 2023	Rohan Watson	9.98	21 years, 68 days	Jamaica	North America	9.91 (2023)		
183	6 July 2023	Kadrian Goldson	9.94	25 years, 240 days	Jamaica	North America	9.89 (2026)		
184	6 July 2023	Kishane Thompson	9.91	21 years, 354 days	Jamaica	North America	9.75 (2025)		
185	7 July 2023	Ryiem Forde	9.96	22 years, 44 days	Jamaica	North America	9.95 (2023)		
186	28 July 2023	Erik Cardoso	9.97	23 years, 147 days	Brazil	South America	9.93 (2025)		
187	28 July 2023	Ronal Longa	9.99	19 years, 28 days	Colombia	South America	9.85 (2026)		
188	9 September 2023	Felipe Bardi	9.96	24 years, 336 days	Brazil	South America	9.96 (2023)		
189	20 April 2024	Christian Miller	9.93	17 years, 340 days	United States	North America	9.93 (2024)		
190	20 April 2024	T'Mars McCallum	9.94	19 years, 336 days	United States	North America	9.83 (2025)		
191	27 April 2024	Brandon Hicklin	9.94	25 years, 25 days	United States	North America	9.93 (2025)		
192	25 May 2024	Jeremiah Azu	9.97	23 years, 10 days	Great Britain	Europe	9.97 (2024)		
193	1 June 2024	Shainer Reginfo	9.90	22 years, 54 days	Cuba	North America	9.90 (2024)		
194	1 June 2024	Reynaldo Espinosa	9.96	21 years, 121 days	Cuba	North America	9.96 (2024)		
195	7 June 2024	Louie Hinchliffe	9.95	21 years, 325 days	Great Britain	Europe	9.95 (2024)		
196	18 June 2024	Jhonny Rentería	9.97	27 years, 84 days	Colombia	South America	9.97 (2024)		
197	18 June 2024	Chituru Ali	9.96	25 years, 73 days	Italy	Europe	9.96 (2024)		
198	28 June 2024	Bryan Levell	9.98	20 years, 188 days	Jamaica	North America	9.82 (2025)		
199	29 June 2024	Owen Ansah	9.99	23 years, 214 days	Germany	Europe	9.98 (2026)		
200	14 July 2024	Benjamin Richardson	9.86	20 years, 208 days	South Africa	Africa	9.86 (2024)		
201	14 July 2024	Ebrahima Camara	9.98	27 years, 300 days	Gambia	Africa	9.98 (2024)		
202	19 July 2024	Jeff Erius	9.98	20 years, 133 days	France	Europe	9.98 (2024)		
203	15 March 2025	Bayanda Walaza	9.99 A	19 years, 34 days	South Africa	Africa	9.89 (2026)		
204	19 April 2025	Kanyinsola Ajayi	9.96	20 years, 217 days	Nigeria	Africa	9.84 (2026)		
205	19 April 2025	Jordan Anthony	9.98	20 years, 294 days	United States	North America	9.91 (2026)		
206	23 April 2025	Maurice Gleaton	9.98	18 years, 148 days	United States	North America	9.92 (2025)		
207	3 May 2025	Tate Taylor	9.92	17 years, 219 days	United States	North America	9.92 (2025)		
208	24 May 2025	Eloy Benitez	9.95	22 years, 17 days	Puerto Rico	North America	9.95 (2025)		
209	30 May 2025	Abdul-Rasheed Saminu	9.86	27 years, 236 days	Ghana	Africa	9.84 (2025)		
210	30 May 2025	Kalen Walker	9.94	23 years, 229 days	United States	North America	9.94 (2025)		
211	31 May 2025	Lachlan Kennedy	9.98 A	21 years, 208 days	Australia	Oceania	9.85 (2026)		
212	21 June 2025	Jerome Blake	9.97	29 years, 307 days	Canada	North America	9.93 (2026)		
213	22 June 2025	Marcellus Moore	9.96	22 years, 357 days	United States	North America	9.96 (2025)		
214	23 July 2025	Retshidisitswe Mlenga	9.99	25 years, 146 days	South Africa	Africa	9.99 (2025)		
215	19 August 2025	Davonte Howell	9.98	19 years, 295 days	Cayman Islands	North America	9.98 (2025)		
216	11 December 2025	Puripol Boonson	9.94	19 years, 332 days	Thailand	Asia	9.90 (2026)		
217	3 April 2026	Collen Kebinatshipi	9.89 A	22 years, 49 days	Botswana	Africa	9.89 (2026)		
218	4 April 2026	Max Thomas	9.90	22 years, 38 days	United States	North America	9.90 (2026)		
219	14 May 2026	Neo Mosebi	9.98	22 years, 28 days	South Africa	Africa	9.98 (2026)		
220	16 May 2026	Jelani Watkins	9.95	21 years, 192 days	United States	North America	9.95 (2026)		
221	16 May 2026	Mustapha Bokpin	9.94	25 years, 88 days	Ghana	Africa	9.94 (2026)		
222	27 May 2026	Israel Okon	9.99	19 years, 197 days	Nigeria	Africa	9.99 (2026)		
223	27 May 2026	Ajani Dwyer	9.98	20 years, 9 days	United States	North America	9.98 (2026)		
224	30 May 2026	Sam Blaskowski	9.89	23 years, 206 days	United States	North America	9.89 (2026)		
225	30 May 2026	Cameron Crump	9.99	26 years, 269 days	United States	North America	9.99 (2026)		
226	10 June 2026	Jaiden Reid	9.95	21 years, 61 days	Cayman Islands	North America	9.95 (2026)		
227	19 June 2026	Gary Card	9.93	19 years, 15 days	Jamaica	North America	9.93 (2026)		
228	19 June 2026	Nishion Ebanks	9.99	26 years, 67 days	Jamaica	North America	9.99 (2026)		
229	20 June 2026	Romell Glave	9.98	26 years, 221 days	Great Britain	Europe	9.97 (2026)		
230	22 June 2026	Adekalu Fakorede	9.98	22 years, 359 days	Nigeria	Africa	9.98 (2026)		
231	26 June 2026	Eliezer Adjibi	9.92 A	25 years, 276 days	Canada	North America	9.92 (2026)		
232	27 June 2026	Bradley Nkoana	9.95	21 years, 151 days	South Africa	Africa	9.95 (2026)		
233	11 July 2026	Travis Williams	9.96	23 years, 122 days	Jamaica	North America	9.96 (2026)		

=== Notes ===
- ^{1} The date on which the athlete first broke the barrier without wind assistance.
- ^{2} The time with which the athlete first broke the barrier without wind assistance.
- ^{3} The age at which the athlete first broke the barrier without wind assistance.
- ^{4} The country for which the athlete competed internationally at the time he first broke the barrier without wind assistance.
- ^{5} The continental athletic association governing the country for which the athlete competed internationally when he first broke the barrier without wind assistance.
- ^{6} The career personal best time achieved by the athlete without wind assistance.
- ^{7} Denotes a run achieved at a high altitude.
- ^{8} Canadian sprinter Ben Johnson was the sixth runner to achieve the feat (having recorded multiple finishes under ten seconds), some of the runs were rescinded after Johnson admitted to using steroids between 1981 and 1988. But his 9.95, with which he first broke the barrier, is valid and could be found on the website of World Athletics.
- ^{9} British sprinter Mark Lewis-Francis recorded a time of 9.97 seconds during the 2001 World Championships quarter-finals on 4 August 2001 (aged 18 years, 334 days) but the wind gauge malfunctioned, invalidating the run.

=== Totals ===
By year
Year	No. of new athletes
1968	1
...	0
1977	1
...	0
1983	2
1984	1
1985	0
1986	1
1987	0
1988	1
1989	2
1990	0
1991	3
1992	3
1993	1
1994	1
1995	2
1996	1
1997	5
1998	2
1999	4
2000	3
2001	0
2002	4
2003	6
2004	1
2005	5
2006	3
2007	4
2008	10
2009	3
2010	5
2011	6
2012	3
2013	6
2014	5
2015	12
2016	10
2017	9
2018	11
2019	7
2020	1
2021	11
2022	13
2023	19
2024	14
2025	14
2026	17

By country
Country	No. of athletes
United States	83
Jamaica	31
Nigeria	17
Great Britain	14
South Africa	12
Canada	7
Ghana	6
Trinidad and Tobago	6
Cuba	5
France	5
Japan	4
Cayman Islands	3
Italy	3
Australia	2
Bahamas	2
Barbados	2
Botswana	2
Brazil	2
China	2
Colombia	2
Ivory Coast	2
Liberia	2
Qatar	2
Turkey	2
Zimbabwe	2
Antigua and Barbuda	1
Cameroon	1
Gambia	1
Germany	1
Kenya	1
Namibia	1
Netherlands Antilles	1
Norway	1
Oman	1
Puerto Rico	1
Saint Kitts and Nevis	1
Sri Lanka	1
Thailand	1

By continent
Continent	No. of athletes
Africa	47
Asia	11
Europe	26
North America	143
Oceania	2
South America	4

== Hand timed marks ==
Prior to 1977, FAT was not required for IAAF official timings. The following sprinters all received a hand-timed mark of 9.9 seconds. All the runners held the world record simultaneously. However, the timing may not have been precise. (Note that Bob Hayes clocked a hand timed 9.9 seconds in the 1964 Olympic final, but his FAT 10.06 was the official time, and it was given as “10.0”)

Sprinters who have broken the 10-second barrier without wind assistance and with manual timing
Date first broken	Athlete	Country	No. of times broken
20 June 1968	Jim Hines	United States	2
20 June 1968	Ronnie Ray Smith	United States	1
20 June 1968	Charles Greene	United States	1
21 June 1972	Steve Williams	United States	4
1 July 1972	Eddie Hart	United States	1
1 July 1972	Rey Robinson	United States	1
5 June 1975	Silvio Leonard	Cuba	1
3 April 1976	Harvey Glance	United States	2
22 May 1976	Don Quarrie	Jamaica	1

== See also ==
- Four-minute mile
- Two-hour marathon
