= Neo Mosebi =

South African sprinter

Personal information
- Born: 16 April 2004 (age 22)

Sport
- Sport: Athletics
- Event: Sprint

Achievements and titles
- Personal best(s): 60m: 6.59 (2026); 100m: 9.98 (2026); 200m: 20.55 (2026)

Neo Mosebi (born 16 April 2004) is a South African sprinter, based in the United States.

== Biography ==
Mosebi took part in a number of sports including cricket, rugby and field hockey, before focusing on athletics. He grew up in Qonce, in the Eastern Cape and attended Maritzburg College in Pietermaritzburg before studying in the United States at Spire Institute and Academy, an international sports boarding school in northeast Ohio just outside of Cleveland. In April 2022, he finished third in the 100 metres at the South African Athletics Championships in Cape Town.

Competing in the United States for Florida State University, he broke the 10-second barrier with a wind-legal run for the 100 metres in May 2026 at the Atlantic Coast Conference Championships (ACC), running 9.98 seconds. He also placed third over 200 metres at the championships in 20.80 seconds. Following the NCAA Regionals, he qualified for the 2026 NCAA Outdoor Championships.
