= Marcellus Moore =

American sprinter

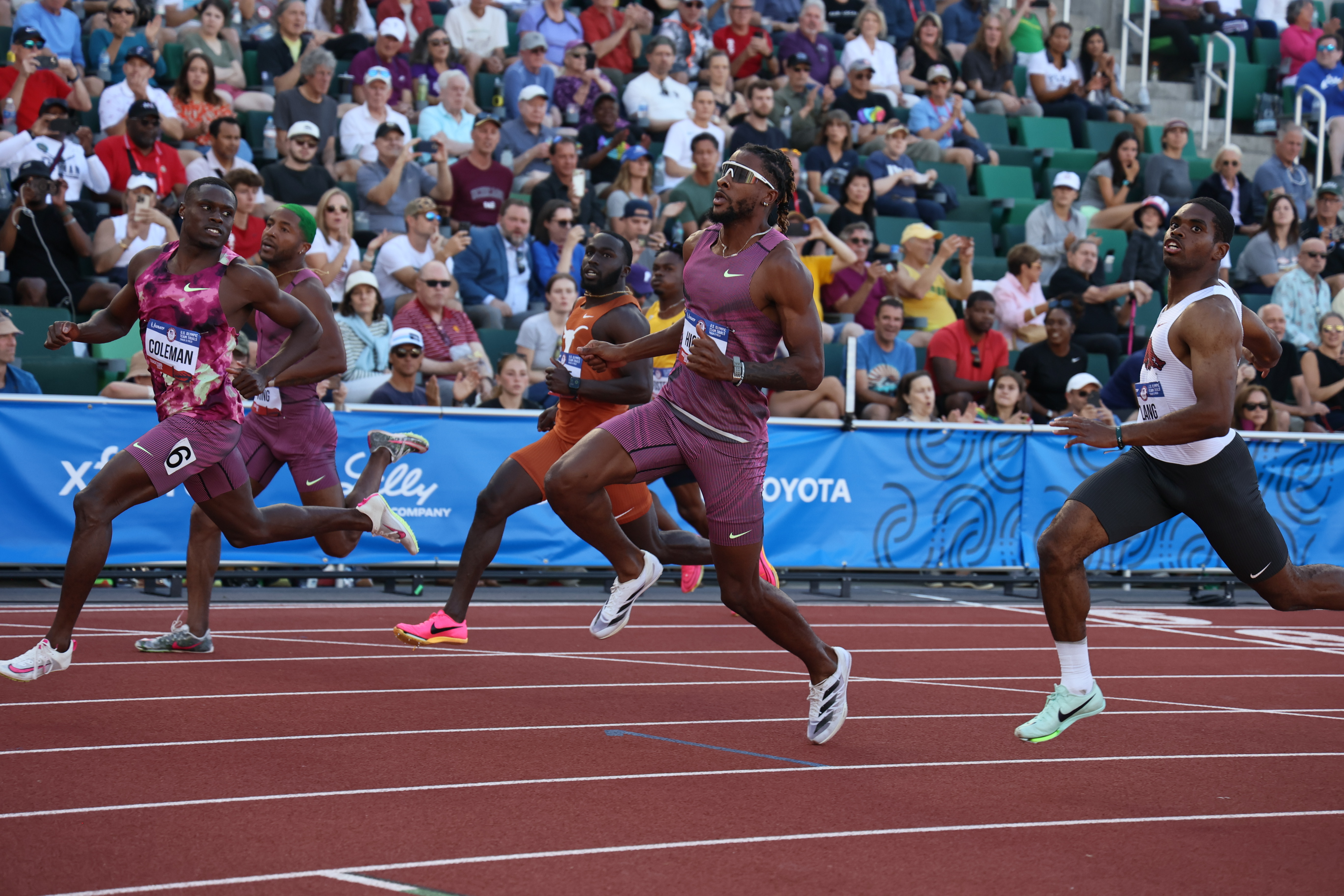
- Moore in 2024

Personal information
- Born: 30 June 2002 (age 24)

Sport
- Sport: Athletics
- Event: Sprinting

Achievements and titles
- Personal best(s): 60m: 6.56 (New York, 2025); 100m: 9.96 (Ontario, 2025); 200m: 20.39 (Austin, 2022)
Medal record
Men's athletics
Representing the United States
Pan American U20 Championships
Gold medal – first place	2019 San José	4 × 100m relay

Marcellus Moore (born 30 June 2002) is an American sprinter.

== Early and personal life ==
From Illinois, he attended Plainfield North High School. He finished high school early in January 2020 to enter the collegiate system, only to have the start of his collegiate days hampered by an inability to compete due to the COVID-19 pandemic.

== Career ==
As a 17-year-old, he ran 6.69 seconds for the 60 metres, and 21.01 seconds for the 200 metres indoors. The 60 metres time set a new under-18 world best. Alongside Arian Smith, Justin Ofotan, and Matthew Boling he won gold at the 2019 Pan American U20 Athletics Championships for the United States in the 4 × 100 m relay.

He was a dual-sport athlete at Purdue University, combining track and field with playing as a wide receiver in American football for the Purdue Boilermakers. He later transferred to the University of Texas in December 2021 and concentrated on sprinting. He finished third at the Big 12 Championships over 100 metres in 2023, running 10.17 seconds behind Courtney Lindsey and Terrence Jones.

He ran 10.05 seconds to place fifteenth overall in the semi-finals of the 100 metres at the US Olympic Trials in Eugene, Oregon in June 2024.

He ran a personal best 6.56 seconds for the 60 metres to win the Millrose Games in New York City on 8 February 2025, finishing ahead of Trayvon Bromell. He finished fourth in 6.59 seconds the 2025 USA Indoor Track and Field Championships. On 29 March 2025 at the Texas Relays, he ran a wind assisted 9.97 in the men's 100 meters (+3.6). On June 22, 2025, at the Bob Vigars Classic in London, Ontario, Moore broke the 10 second barrier as he ran a wind legal 9.96 seconds in the men's 100 meters (+1.5 m/s). He reached the final of the 100 metres at the 2025 USA Outdoor Track and Field Championships, placing eighth with a time of 10.03 seconds (+1.8).
