= Caisja Chandler =

American sprinter (born 2000)

Personal information
- Nationality: USA
- Born: June 18, 2000 (age 26)
- Home town: Cleveland, Ohio
- Education: Central Middle School; Euclid High School; University of Cincinnati; University of Southern California
- Height: 167 cm (5 ft 6 in)
- Weight: 55 kg (121 lb)

Sport
- Sport: Sport of athletics
- Events: 100 metres 200 metres
- College team: Cincinnati Bearcats; USC Trojans
- Coached by: Carmelita Jeter
- Now coaching: UNLV Rebels

Achievements and titles
- National finals: 2019 USA U20s; • 100 m, 4th; • 200 m, 3rd (bronze); 2023 NCAA Indoors; • 200 m, 4th; 2023 NCAAs; • 200 m, 6th; • 4 × 100 m, 9th; • 4 × 400 m, 4th
- Personal bests: 100 m: 10.99 (+1.1) (2023) 200 m: 22.37 (+0.8) (2023)
Medal record
Women's athletics
Representing the United States
Pan American U20 Championships
Gold medal – first place	2019 San José	4 × 100 m relay
- Updated on April 4, 2024

Caisja Chandler (born June 18, 2000) is an American sprinter. She won the 4 × 100 m relay at the 2019 Pan American U20 Athletics Championships representing the United States. In 2023, she set the Loker Stadium facility record for 100 metres with a 10.99-second time.

== Career ==
Chandler started running at Central Middle School in Euclid, Ohio. In 2017, she placed 5th at the AAU Junior Olympics in the 200 metres. At Euclid High School, she was an OHSAA state champion in the 200 m, setting the state record in that event her senior year. Chandler first represented the U.S. at the 2019 Pan American U20 Athletics Championships, where she won a gold medal in the 4 × 100 m relay.

Running for the Cincinnati Bearcats track and field program, Chandler set various school records. She was injured her senior year of college, but she recovered to win her conference meet. Chandler did not qualify for an NCAA championship final until 2023, after she had transferred to the USC Trojans track and field program for her final year of eligibility. Chandler set the Loker Stadium facility record for 100 m with a 10.99-second clocking in 2023. Her best NCAA championship finish was 4th, at the 2023 NCAA Division I Indoor Track and Field Championships in the 200 m.

== Personal life ==
Chandler is from Cleveland, Ohio. She originally studied at the University of Cincinnati and then transferred to the University of Southern California where she mastered digital media. In 2021, Chandler became the first USC athlete to sign a name, image, and likeness endorsement deal. The deal was from a local marketplace for student-athletes. She was coached by Carmelita Jeter for her last year of collegiate competition. In December 2023, Chandler became a coach for the UNLV Rebels track and field program.

== Statistics ==
=== Personal best progression ===
100 m progression
#	Mark	Pl.	Competition	Venue	Date	Ref.
1	12.20 (+0.7 m/s)	4th (Heat 1-HS)	Ohio OHSAA Outdoor State Championships Division I	Columbus, OH	June 3, 2016	
2	12.01 (−0.7 m/s)	4th	AAU Olympic Games	Ypsilanti, MI	August 1, 2017	
3	11.53 (+1.4 m/s)	2nd place, silver medalist(s)	Lenny Lyles-Clark Wood Invitational	Louisville, KY	April 26, 2019	
4	11.48 (+0.2 m/s)	(gold) (Heat 4)	The American Athletic Conference Championships	Wichita, KS	May 10, 2019	
5	11.43 (+0.7 m/s)	(silver) (Heat 3)	NCAA East Preliminary Round	Jacksonville, FL	May 22, 2019	
6	11.33 (+2.0 m/s)	4th	USATF U20 Championships	Miramar, FL	June 21, 2019	
7	11.28 (+2.0 m/s)	3rd place, bronze medalist(s)	The American Outdoor Track & Field Championships	Tampa, FL	May 15, 2021	
8	11.26 (±0.0 m/s)	4th (Qualification 2)	NCAA Preliminary East Round	Jacksonville, FL	May 28, 2021	
9	10.99 (+1.1 m/s)	1st place, gold medalist(s)	Trojan Invite	Los Angeles, California	April 7, 2023	

200 m progression
#	Mark	Pl.	Competition	Venue	Date	Ref.
1	24.24 (+1.8 m/s)	(gold) (Heat 2-HS)	Ohio OHSAA Outdoor State Championships Division I	Columbus, OH	June 3, 2016	
2	23.89 (−1.2 m/s)	(gold) (Heat -HS)	OHSAA D1 Region 1, Austintown Fitch HS	Austintown, OH	May 24, 2018	
3	23.59 (+1.8 m/s)	1st place, gold medalist(s)	OHSAA D1 Region 1, Austintown Fitch HS	Austintown, OH	May 24, 2018	
4	23.24 (+0.3 m/s)	2nd place, silver medalist(s)	OHSAA D1 State Championships, Jesse Owens Stadium – Ohio State University	Columbus, OH	May 31, 2018	
5	23.18 (+1.9 m/s)	(gold) (Round D)		Knoxville, TN	April 12, 2019	
6	23.15 (+1.3 m/s)	2nd place, silver medalist(s)	The American Conference Championships	Wichita, KS	May 11, 2019	
7	23.04 (+0.7 m/s)	(silver) (Heat 1)	NCAA East Preliminary Round	Jacksonville, FL	May 23, 2019	
8	22.97 (+1.0 m/s)	(bronze) (Qualification 1)	NCAA East Preliminary Round	Jacksonville, FL	May 24, 2019	
9	22.92 (+0.4 m/s)	1st place, gold medalist(s)	War Eagle Invitational 2021	Auburn, AL	April 16, 2021	
10	22.85 (+2.0 m/s)	2nd place, silver medalist(s)	The American Outdoor Track & Field Championships	Tampa, FL	May 15, 2021	
11	22.79 (+0.5 m/s)	(silver) (Qualification 3)	NCAA Preliminary East Round	Jacksonville, FL	May 28, 2021	
12	22.70A	(silver) (Heat 3)	NCAA Division I Women's Indoor Track and Field Championships	Albuquerque, NM	March 9, 2023	
13	22.67 (+1.5 m/s)	1st place, gold medalist(s)	Annual Mt. SAC Relays	Walnut, CA	April 14, 2023	
14	22.38 (+1.9 m/s)	1st place, gold medalist(s)	Pac-12 Track & Field Championships	Walnut, CA	May 13, 2023	
15	22.37 (+0.8 m/s)	(gold) (Semi-final 3)	NCAA Division I Women's Outdoor Track and Field Championships	Austin, TX	June 7, 2023	
