= Otito Ogbonnia =

American football player (born 2000)

No. 91 – Dallas Cowboys
- Position: Defensive tackle
- Roster status: Active

Personal information
- Born: August 25, 2000 (age 26); Houston, Texas, U.S.
- Listed height: 6 ft 4 in (1.93 m)
- Listed weight: 320 lb (145 kg)

Career information
- High school: James E. Taylor (Katy, Texas)
- College: UCLA (2018–2021)
- NFL draft: 2022: 5th round, 160th overall pick

Career history
- Los Angeles Chargers (2022–2025); Dallas Cowboys (2026–present)

Awards and highlights
- Second-team All-Pac-12 (2021)

Career NFL statistics as of Week 3, 2026
- Total tackles: 92
- Sacks: 0.5
- Stats at Pro Football Reference

Otito Ogbonnia
Medal record

Men's track and field

Representing United States

Pan American U20 Championships
Gold medal – first place	2019 San José	Shot put

Otito Ogbonnia (born August 25, 2000) is an American professional football defensive tackle for the Dallas Cowboys of the National Football League (NFL). He played college football for the UCLA Bruins.

== Early life ==
Ogbonnia attended James E. Taylor High School in Katy, Texas. He was a two-time all-district selection in football, recording 68 tackles, 24 tackles for loss, five sacks, and two forced fumbles as a senior. He also competed in track and field, winning state titles in both the shot put and the discus throw as a senior. He was also the top-ranked shot putter in the class of 2017.

== College career ==
Ogbonnia attended the University of California, Los Angeles, where he played football for the Bruins. He also won shot put gold medals at the 2019 USATF U20 Outdoor Championships and the 2019 Pan American U20 Athletics Championships.

== Professional career ==
Pre-draft measurables
Height	Weight	Arm length	Hand span	Wingspan	40-yard dash	10-yard split	20-yard split	Bench press
6 ft 3 3/4 in (1.92 m)	324 lb (147 kg)	34 3/8 in (0.87 m)	10 in (0.25 m)	6 ft 11 5/8 in (2.12 m)	5.31 s	1.85 s	3.08 s	29 reps
All values from NFL Combine/Pro Day

=== Los Angeles Chargers ===
Ogbonnia was selected by the Los Angeles Chargers in the fifth round (160th overall) of the 2022 NFL draft. He was placed on injured reserve on November 16, 2022, with a ruptured patellar tendon.

Ogbonnia was placed on the reserve/physically unable to perform list on August 29, 2023. He was activated on November 5.

Ogbonnia began the 2025 season as one of Los Angeles' backup defensive linemen. In five appearances for the team, he recorded three combined tackles. On October 21, 2025, Ogbonnia was placed on injured reserve due to an elbow injury suffered in Week 7 against the Indianapolis Colts. He was activated on December 8, ahead of the team's Week 14 matchup against the Philadelphia Eagles.

=== Dallas Cowboys ===
On March 11, 2026, Ogbonnia signed a one-year, $3 million contract with the Dallas Cowboys.
