= Aurora Rynda =

Canadian middle-distance runner

Personal information
- Born: 26 October 2000 (age 25)

Sport
- Sport: Athletics
- Event: Middle-distance running

Achievements and titles
- Personal best(s): 800m: 2:00.66 (Gainesville, 2024); Indoors; 800m: 2:00.67 (Boston, 2025)
Medal record
Women's athletics
Representing Canada
Pan American U20 Championships
Silver medal – second place	2019 San José	800 m
Commonwealth Youth Games
Bronze medal – third place	2017 Bahamas	800m

Aurora Rynda (born 26 October 2000) is a Canadian middle-distance runner.

== Early life ==
From Toronto, she studied at Lawrence Park Collegiate Institute and was the 2017 Ontario Federation of Secondary Schools Athletic Association (OFSAA) 800 metres champion prior to committing to the University of Michigan in 2018.

== Career ==
She was a bronze medalist over 800 metres at the 2017 Youth Commonwealth Games in Nassau, Bahamas. She competed for Canada at the 2018 World Athletics U20 Championships in Tampere, and was part of the 4x400 metres relay team which placed fourth overall. She was a silver medalist over 800 metres at the 2019 Pan American U20 Athletics Championships.

She competed in the American Collegiate system for the Michigan Wolverines, where she was a relay teammate of compatriot Savannah Sutherland. In February 2022, she set a Canadian national indoor record over 600 metres at the Windy City Invite in Chicago, with a time of 1:27.05, to break the previous record set by Camille Cato in 1984.

In April 2024, she ran a personal best in the 800 metres winning the Drake Relays in Des Moines, Iowa in a time of 2:00.97, her previous personal best of 2:01.35 had been set in 2021. She lowered it again to 2:00.66 at the Holloway Pro Classic in Gainesville, Florida in July 2024. She was runner-up to Jazz Shukla at the 2024 Canadian Athletics Championships.

In January 2025, she ran 2:00.67 for the 800 metres whilst competing in Boston, Massachusetts. She was selected for the 2025 World Athletics Indoor Championships in Nanjing in March 2025.
