= Arian Smith =

American football player (born 2001)

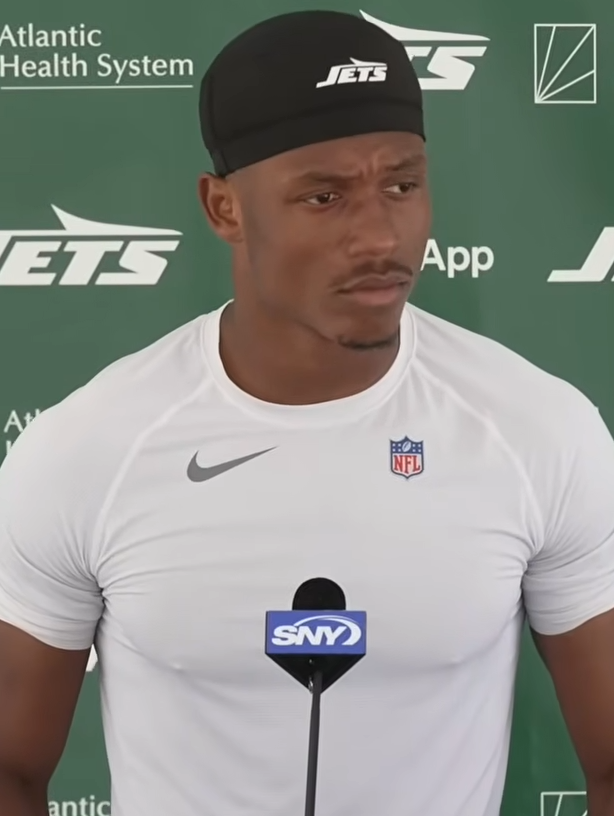
- Smith with the New York Jets in 2025

No. 82 – New York Jets
- Position: Wide receiver
- Roster status: Injured reserve

Personal information
- Born: October 11, 2001 (age 25)
- Listed height: 6 ft 0 in (1.83 m)
- Listed weight: 179 lb (81 kg)

Career information
- High school: Mulberry (Mulberry, Florida); Lakeland (Lakeland, Florida)
- College: Georgia (2020–2024)
- NFL draft: 2025: 4th round, 110th overall pick

Career history
- New York Jets (2025–present)

Awards and highlights
- 2× CFP national champion (2021, 2022)

Career NFL statistics as of 2025
- Receptions: 7
- Receiving yards: 52
- Receiving touchdowns: 0
- Stats at Pro Football Reference

Arian Ryshaun Smith (born October 11, 2001) is an American professional football wide receiver for the New York Jets of the National Football League (NFL). He played college football for the Georgia Bulldogs, winning two national championships. Smith was selected by the Jets in the fourth round of the 2025 NFL draft.

== Early life ==
Smith first attended Mulberry High School in Mulberry, Florida, where he played football and track and field. In 2018, Smith set the farthest long jump in the country, jumping 25–03.25. While playing for Mulberry, Smith played running back, quarterback, wide receiver, and defensive back for the football team. In his junior year, Smith won a gold medal at the 2019 Pan American U20 Athletics Championships with Justin Ofotan, Marcellus Moore, and Matthew Boling for the United States in the 4x100m relay. Before his senior year of high school, Smith transferred to Lakeland High School in Lakeland, Florida, continuing to play football and track and field. Smith primarily played wide receiver for Lakeland and was selected to participate in the 2020 Under Armour All-American game. Ranked as a four-star recruit by ESPN, Smith received offers from many colleges, ultimately committing to play college football for the University of Georgia over Alabama.

== College career ==
=== Track and field ===
Smith initially continued to play both football and track and field for Georgia. In 2021, Arian was named a first-team All-American for track and field, also qualifying for the SEC Championship for his time in the 100-meter dash. In 2023, Smith announced he would continue solely on his football career and no longer compete in track and field.

=== American football ===
Smith redshirted his freshman year and played in the last four games of the 2020 season. His first catch was a 31-yard touchdown against South Carolina. The following year, Smith only played in four of fifteen games this season due to various injuries. He caught a 35-yard pass against Missouri and a 67-yard pass against UAB, both for touchdowns. In 2022, Smith again missed time due to injuries, missing the season's first four games recovering from surgery for a high ankle sprain received in practice. In the Peach Bowl, Smith had a season-high 129 receiving yards in the game, including a career-long 76-yard catch for a touchdown in a win against Ohio State. Smith played in all fourteen games the following season, scoring a touchdown against UAB and one against Florida State in the 2023 Orange Bowl. Using a granted extra year of eligibility, Smith returned to play for Georgia in 2024. In week 2, Smith caught a 50-yard pass for a touchdown against Tennessee Tech. In week five, Smith had 132 yards and a touchdown in a loss against Alabama. In week 7, Smith had a career-high 134 yards, including a 55 yard touchdown, in a win against Mississippi State. During the 2024 season, Smith had the most drops in the Power Four conferences with ten. Despite this, Smith led the Bulldogs in receiving yards with 817. After the 2024 season, Smith declared for the 2025 NFL draft.

== Professional career ==
Pre-draft measurables
Height	Weight	Arm length	Hand span	Wingspan	40-yard dash	10-yard split	20-yard split	20-yard shuttle	Three-cone drill	Vertical jump	Broad jump
6 ft 0 1/8 in (1.83 m)	179 lb (81 kg)	31 1/4 in (0.79 m)	9 in (0.23 m)	6 ft 5 in (1.96 m)	4.36 s	1.51 s	2.57 s	4.19 s	6.82 s	38.0 in (0.97 m)	10 ft 7 in (3.23 m)
All values from NFL Combine

Smith was selected by the New York Jets in the fourth round, with the 110th overall pick in the 2025 NFL draft. Appearing in 16 games for the Jets during his rookie campaign, Smith recorded seven receptions for 52 scoreless yards, as well as four rush attempts for 13 yards.

On September 22, 2026, Smith was placed on season–ending injured reserve after suffering a torn ACL in Week 2 against the Green Bay Packers.

== Career statistics ==
College statistics
Year	Team	GP	Receiving				Rushing			
Year	Team	GP	Rec	Yds	Avg	TD	Att	Yds	Avg	TD
2020	Georgia	4	2	86	43.0	1	1	−9	−9.0	0
2021	Georgia	4	3	102	34.0	2	1	15	15.0	0
2022	Georgia	11	7	198	28.3	1	0	0	0.0	0
2023	Georgia	14	8	153	19.1	2	1	33	33.0	0
2024	Georgia	14	48	817	19.9	4	5	54	10.8	0
Career		47	42	1,356	19.9	10	8	93	11.6	0
