= Kalen Walker =

American sprinter

Personal information
- Born: 13 October 2001 (age 24)
- Height: 5 ft 8 in (173 cm)
- Weight: 140 lb (64 kg)

Sport
- Sport: Athletics
- Event: Sprint

Achievements and titles
- Personal best(s): 60m: 6.51 (2024); 100m: 9.94 (2025); 200m: 20.94 (2023)

Kalen Walker (born 13 October 2001) is an American sprinter. He broke the 10-second barrier with a wind-legal personal best time of 9.94 seconds in 2025, whilst competing for the University of Iowa.

== Early life ==
From the southeast of Iowa, Walker attended Eddyville-Blakesburg-Fremont High School, although his final season at high school was canceled due to COVID-19 pandemic. He attended Indian Hills Community College for a year, before attending the University of Iowa in 2021. He was a multi-sport athlete whilst at high school, and won state honours in American football and basketball, as well as athletics.

== Career ==
Competing for the University of Iowa, Walker was the runner-up in the 60 meters at the 2024 NCAA Indoor Championships in Boston, Massachusetts. In June 2024, he reached the semi-finals of the 100 metres at the US Olympic Trials in Eugene, Oregon. In the October of that year he was timed at 4.15 seconds for the 40-yard-dash.

In May 2025, he won the Big Ten Conference 100 metres title in a time of 10.17 seconds. Later that month he qualified for the NCAA Championships and broke the 10-second barrier with a wind-legal personal best of 9.94 seconds for the 100 metres at the West regional qualifiers (+1.1 m/s) in College Station, Texas. He concluded his collegiate career with the 2025 NCAA Outdoor Championships, where he was a semi-finalist in the 100 metres, and ended as a three-time All-American, two-time Big Ten champion and Iowa school record holder in the 60 metres, 100 metres, and in the 4x100 metres relay.
