= Cole Beck =

American athlete (born 1999)

Personal information
- Nationality: United States
- Born: Coleton Beck; 15 March 1999 (age 27)

Sport
- Sport: Athletics
- Event: Sprint

Achievements and titles
- Personal bests: 60m: 6.57 (Louisville, 2023); 100m: 9.97 (Austin, 2023); 200m: 20.47 (Durham, 2022)

Coleton Beck (born 5 March 1999) is an American track and field athlete who competes as a sprinter. He played college football at Virginia Tech.

== Biography ==
Beck graduated from Blacksburg High School before attending Virginia Tech. Between 2018 and 2020 he combined running track with playing for the university football team as a wide receiver. In 2020, he concentrated solely on sprinting after breaking his collarbone in 2019. He returned to the football team as a punt returner in 2022. Before that, he lowered his 100 metres personal best to 10.11 seconds in 2021.

In February 2023, he lowered his 60m personal best to 6.57 seconds in Louisville. In May 2023, in Jacksonville at the NCAA East trials he ran a wind-assisted 9.87 seconds 100 metres, leading him to be dubbed “the fastest white dude in history”. After the race he used his Twitter account to call himself the “fastest footballer” and tagged NFL receiver Tyreek Hill, being quoted in The Roanoke Times that he would “love to race him”. At the NCAA Championships held in Texas in June 2023, Beck ran a legal 9.97s in the 100m heats to break his own school record and officially break the 10-second barrier.

In August 2023, Beck returned to the Virginia Tech Hokies football roster. In September 2023, he revealed he was offered a chance to compete in track and field at the 2023 Pan American Games in Santiago, Chile. However, he declined the invitation as it clashed with two matches for Virginia Tech.

In January 2024, he declared for the 2024 NFL draft. Undrafted, he was invited to rookie minicamps by the NFL teams Atlanta Falcons and New York Jets.

== Personal life ==
He graduated with a bachelor's degree at Virginia Tech in apparel, housing, and resource management in 2022. His masters degree course was in building construction science and management.
