= Billy Hayes Track =

Athletics stadium in Bloomington, Indiana

Billy Hayes Track at Robert C. Haugh Track and Field Complex
- Interactive map of Billy Hayes Track at Robert C. Haugh Track and Field Complex
- Location: 1601 North Fee Lane; Bloomington, Indiana 47408
- Coordinates: 39.182439°N 86.515453°W
- Owner: Indiana University Bloomington
- Capacity: 3,200 (expandable to 6,200)
- Surface: Polytan

Billy Hayes Track is a track and field stadium located on the campus of Indiana University in Bloomington, Indiana. It is named after former Hoosier coach Earl C. "Billy" Hayes, who led the Hoosiers cross country team to 3 national titles. He also coached the indoor and outdoor track teams to a combined 5 Big Ten titles, coached 7 IU athletes to the Olympics, and was crucial in helping create the National Collegiate Cross Country Coaches Association.

== Features ==
Billy Hayes Track features a Polytan surface. This surface was installed prior to the 2010 outdoor track season. In addition to the surface, the track features 4 long jump and triple jump pits, 8 pole vault boxes, 2 shot put rings, 2 javelin runways, and 2 cages for discus and hammer throw. The track also includes 2 sprinting straightaways for competition depending on the direction of the wind. The facility contains 3200 permanent seats stretching from the start of the front straightaway all the way down into the first turn. In addition, 3000 temporary bleacher seats can be installed around the track for bigger meets such as NCAA championship meets and the IHSAA state meet. New lights were installed in 2004 and new pole vault and high jump standards, new hurdles, and a new discus cage were introduced prior to the 2011 NCAA regional meet.

== Notable events ==
- NCAA national outdoor championships: 1966, 1997
- NCAA mid-east regional: 2005
- NCAA east preliminary round: 2011, 2022
- USATF U20 Outdoor Championships: 1978, 1979, 1982, 2012, 2018
- Big Ten Outdoor Championships: 2010, 2018, 2023
- IHSAA State finals 2004–2019, 2022–2023
