= 2019 Pan American U20 Athletics Championships =

XX Pan American U20 Athletics Championships
- Dates: July 19-July 21
- Host city: San José, Costa Rica
- Venue: Estadio Nacional
- Level: U20
- Events: 44
- Participation: 452 athletes from 31 nations

The 2019 Pan American U20 Athletics Championships is the 20th edition of the biennial track and field competition for under-20 athletes from the Americas, organised by the Association of Panamerican Athletics. It is held in San José, Costa Rica, from 19 to 21 July 2019.

== Medal summary ==
=== Men ===
Event	Gold		Silver		Bronze	
100 metres +0.5 m/s	Matthew Boling; United States	10.11	Oblique Seville; Jamaica	10.21	Michael Stephens; Jamaica	10.34
200 metres +0.0 m/s	Matthew Boling; United States	20.31	Kennedy Lightner; United States	20.56	Lucas Conceição Vilar; Brazil	20.70
400 metres	Justin Robinson; United States	45.04	Myles Misener-Daley; Canada	45.62	Bovel McPherson; Jamaica	45.97
800 metres	Raul Neri; Mexico	1:49.10	Darius Kipyego; United States	1:49.46	Agnaldo Barboza; Brazil	1:49.48
1500 metres	Foster Malleck; Canada	3:47.05	Carter Free; Canada	3:48.29	John Castro; Puerto Rico	3:49.05
5000 metres	Joshua Desonuza; Canada	15:17.15	Marc-Andre Trudeau; Canada	15:17.56	César Gómez; Mexico	15:18.64
10,000 metres	Daniel Kilrea; United States	30:49.45	Nicholas Yanek; United States	31:06.06	Frank Luján; Peru	31:07.87
100 metres hurdles +2.7 m/s	Eric Edwards Jr. United States	13.11	Tai Brown; United States	13.36	Akeem Cargill; Jamaica	13.56
400 metres hurdles	Alison dos Santos; Brazil	48.49; PRU20	James Smith; United States	49.84	Rovane Williams; Jamaica	50.29
3000 m steeplechase	César Gómez; Mexico	9:11.05	Julio Palomino; Peru	9:14.39	Tate Wyatt; Canada	9:19.23
4 × 100 m relay	United States; Arian Smith; Justin Ofotan; Marcellus Moore; Matthew Boling	38.62; WRU20	Jamaica; Oblique Seville; Michali Everett; Xavier Nairne; Kevon Stone	39.20	Brazil; Arielton Costa; Lucas Rodrigues; Lucas Conceição Vilar; Erik Cardoso	39.42
4 × 400 m relay	United States; Frederick Lewis; Matthew Boling; Matthew Moorer; Justin Robinson	2:59.30; WRU20	Jamaica; Evaldo Whitehorne; Jeremy Farr; Bovel McPherson; Anthony Cox	3:00.99	Brazil; Lucas Rodrigues; Bruno Benedito; Lucas Conceição Vilar; Douglas Mendes	3:02.84
10,000 m track walk	César Córdoba; Mexico	42:26.83	Carlos Mercenario Arsof; Mexico	43:08.94	Sebastián Merchán; Colombia	43:16.71
High jump	Erick Portillo; Mexico	2.18	Charles McBride II; United States	2.14	Nicolas Numair; Chile	2.14
Pole vault	Branson Ellis; United States	5.35	Pablo Zaffaroni; Argentina	5.20	Max Manson; United States	5.15
Long jump	Wayne Pinnock; Jamaica	7.82	Phillip Austin III; United States	7.82	Shaquille Lowe; Jamaica	7.47
Triple jump	Geiner Moreno; Colombia	16.40	Andy Hechavarría; Cuba	16.33	Terrol Wilson; Jamaica	15.99
Shot put	Otito Ogbonnia; United States	20.72	Joshua Sobota; United States	20.56	Juan Carley Vázquez; Cuba	20.16
Discus throw	Claudio Romero; Chile	62.07	Dabirac Pérez; Cuba	61.48	Joshua Sobota; United States	61.32
Hammer throw	Rowan Hamilton; Canada	75.35	Ronald Mencía; Cuba	71.34	Julio Nobile; Argentina	69.40
Javelin throw	Tzuriel Pedigo; United States	76.95; RPU20	Luiz Maurício da Silva; Brazil	74.51	Tyriq Horsford; Trinidad and Tobago	71.42
Decathlon (junior)	Yancarlos Hernández; Cuba	7254	Jett Kinder; United States	6627	Estebán Ibáñez; El Salvador	6426
WR world record | AR area record | CR championship record | GR games record | NR national record | OR Olympic record | PB personal best | SB season best | WL world leading (in a given season)

=== Women ===
Event	Gold		Silver		Bronze	
100 metres -1.4 m/s	Briana Williams; Jamaica	11.38	Thelma Davies; United States	11.39	Brandee Presley; United States	11.41
200 metres +1.4 m/s	Lanae-Tava Thomas; United States	22.80	Jayda Eckford; United States	23.04	Lorraine Barbosa; Brazil	23.06
400 metres	Kayla Davis; United States	51.61	Alexis Holmes; United States	52.59	Doneisha Anderson; Bahamas	53.23
800 metres	Athing Mu; United States	2:05.50	Aurora Rynda; Canada	2:07.78	Morgan Foster; United States	2:07.96
1500 metres	Maggie Smith; Canada	4:25.47	Rachel Hickey; United States	4:26.83	Joselyn Chau; Canada	4:27.20
3000 metres	Brogan MacDougall; Canada	9:23.23	Marlee Starliper; United States	9:27.88	Ana Cifuentes; Colombia	10:07.41
5000 metres	Sofia Mamani; Peru	17:16.59	Anne Forsyth; Canada	17:20.66	Mariana Martínez; Mexico	17:30.49
100 metres hurdles +0.6 m/s	Jasmine Jones; United States	13.20	Ackera Nugent; Jamaica	13.37	Micaela Rosa De Mello; Brazil	13.41
400 metres hurdles	Jessica de Oliveira; Brazil	55.94; PRU20	Masai Russell; United States	56.29	Valeria Cabezas; Colombia	56.67
3000 m steeplechase	Lydia Olivere; United States	10:12.16	Grace Fetherstonhaugh; Canada	10:32.13	Megan Worrel; United States	10:48.04
4 × 100 m relay	United States; Thelma Davies; Semira Killebrew; Caisja Chandler; Brandee Presley	43.51	Jamaica; Briana Williams; Shakiera Bowra; Michae Harriot; Brandy Hall	44.36	Canada; Tatiana Aholou; Catherine Léger; Deondra Green; Makenzy Pierre-Webster	44.42
4 × 400 m relay	United States; Alexis Holmes; Kimberly Harris; Ziyah Holman; Kayla Davis	3:24.04; WRU20	Canada; Lauren Gale; Aurora Rynda; Alyssa Marsh; Catherine Léger	3:30.68	Jamaica; Daniella Deer; Shaqueena Foote; Lashanna Graham; Kavia Francis	3:31.34
10,000 m track walk	Glenda Morejón; Ecuador	44:46.02	Mary Luz Andía; Peru	45:22.94	Noelia Vargas; Costa Rica	46:32.92
High jump	Sanaa Barnes; United States	1.83	Lamara Distin; Jamaica	1.81	Shelby Tyler; United States	1.78
Pole vault	Nastassja Campbell; United States	4.27	Hayley Horvath; United States	3.90	Luciana Gomez Iriondo; Argentina	3.80
Long jump	Claire Bryant; United States	6.15	Shantae Foreman; Jamaica	6.13	Ijeyikowoicho Onah; United States	6.09
Triple jump	Lotavia Brown; Jamaica	13.22	Leyanis Pérez; Cuba	13.21	Mikeisha Welcome; Saint Vincent and the Grenadines	13.15
Shot put	Trinity Tutti; Canada	15.95	Tedreauna Britt; United States	15.80	Patience Marshall; United States	15.69
Discus throw	Melany del Pilar Matheus; Cuba	59.53; RPU20	Trinity Tutti; Canada	54.87	Silinda Morales; Cuba	54.75
Hammer throw	Liz Collia; Cuba	62.36	Hawa Mahama; United States	61.61	Alegna Osorio Mayarí; Cuba	60.15
Javelin throw	Juleisy Angulo; Ecuador	58.96 NR	Skylar Ciccolini; United States	53.58	Ava Curry; United States	47.67
Heptathlon	Anna Hall; United States	5847 pts RPU20	Marys Patterson; Cuba	5420	Timara Chapman; United States	5060
WR world record | AR area record | CR championship record | GR games record | NR national record | OR Olympic record | PB personal best | SB season best | WL world leading (in a given season)

== Medal table ==
* Host nation (Costa Rica)

Pan American U20 Athletics Championships
Rank	Nation	Gold	Silver	Bronze	Total
1	United States	21	19	10	50
2	Canada	6	8	3	17
3	Mexico	4	1	2	7
4	Jamaica	3	7	7	17
5	Cuba	3	5	3	11
6	Brazil	2	1	6	9
7	Ecuador	2	0	0	2
8	Peru	1	2	1	4
9	Colombia	1	0	3	4
10	Chile	1	0	1	2
11	Argentina	0	1	2	3
12	Bahamas	0	0	1	1
12	Costa Rica*	0	0	1	1
12	El Salvador	0	0	1	1
12	Puerto Rico	0	0	1	1
12	Saint Vincent and the Grenadines	0	0	1	1
12	Trinidad and Tobago	0	0	1	1
Totals (17 entries)		44	44	44	132
