= USATF U20 Outdoor Championships =

Annual track and field competition in the United States

- Current season, competition or edition: 2026 USATF U20 Outdoor Championships
- Sport: Track and field
- Founded: 1972
- Country: United States
- Website: USATF official website

The USATF U20 Outdoor Championships, formerly known as the USA Junior Outdoor Track & Field Championships, is an annual outdoor track and field competition organized by USA Track & Field (USATF) which serves as the national championship for American athletes aged under 20. The competition is also used for American national team selection for the IAAF World U20 Championships in even-numbered years and the Pan American U20 Athletics Championships in odd-numbered years.

The event was established in 1972 and were originally organized by the Amateur Athletic Union. The Athletics Congress of the USA took over organizational duties in 1980, and the competition was held under the USATF name for the first time in 1993. The men's and women's competitions were held separately from 1972 to 1982, with combined sex championships being held in 1974, and 1978–1980 within that period.

It is held separately from the USATF National Junior Olympic Track & Field Championships, which hosts various age category competitions for athletes aged between 8 and 18.

== Events ==
On the current programme, a total of 38 individual United States U20 Championship athletics events are contested, divided evenly between men and women. For each of the sexes, there are six track running events, three obstacle events, four jumps, four throws, a racewalk and a combined track and field event.

Track running

- 100 meters, 200 meters, 400 meters, 800 meters, 1500 meters, 3000 meters (women only), 5000 meters, 10,000 meters (men only)

Obstacle events

- 100 meters hurdles (women only), 110 meters hurdles (men only), 400 meters hurdles, 3000 meters steeplechase

Jumping events

- Pole vault, high jump, long jump, triple jump

Throwing events

- Shot put, discus throw, javelin throw, hammer throw

Walking events

- 10,000 meters race walk

Combined events

- Decathlon (men only), heptathlon (women only)

For the years 1972 and 1973, track races were held over imperial distances before metrication of the sport in 1974. The results of field events were measured in metric units from 2001 onwards. The distance events were mile run, 3 miles and 6 miles. The women's pentathlon was replaced by the heptathlon in 1981. The decathlon was not held at the first edition and the pentathlon not held at the second edition. The women's 400 m hurdles was not contested in 1972 or 1974. The steeplechase was held over 2000 m for men in 1986 and for women in 2002.

The women's distance programme varied in early years, with no distance race over one mile in 1972, a two-mile race in 1973, no race again in 1974, then the introduction of a 3000 m in 1975. A women's 10,000 m was held from 1988 to 1998, but the women's 5000 m (introduced in 1996) became the women's longest distance thereafter. A women's steeplechase was first held in 2002. Women's racewalking event has varied in distance over the years, starting over one mile in 1972, skipping the 1973 and 1974 editions, being held over 1500 m in 1975, over 3000 m from 1976 to 1985, 5000 m from 1986 to 1999, before finally matching the men's 10,000 m distance in from 2000 onwards. The women's field programme gradually expanded to match the men's, with triple jump being introduced in 1985, and pole vault and hammer throw in 1995.

== Editions ==
Edition	Venue	Stadium	Date
2026	Eugene, Oregon	Hayward Field	June 18–19
2025	Eugene, Oregon	Hayward Field	June 19–20
2024	Eugene, Oregon	Hayward Field	June 12–13
2023	Eugene, Oregon	Hayward Field	July 7–9
2022	Eugene, Oregon	Hayward Field	June 23–25
2021	Cancelled due to the COVID-19 pandemic		
2020	Cancelled due to the COVID-19 pandemic		
2019	Miramar, Florida	Ansin Sports Complex	June 21–23
2018	Bloomington, Indiana	Billy Hayes Track	June 15–17
2017	Sacramento, California	Hornet Stadium	June 22–25
2016	Clovis, California	Veteran's Memorial Stadium at Buchanan High School	June 24–26
2015	Eugene, Oregon	Hayward Field	June 25–28
2014	Eugene, Oregon	Hayward Field	(multis - Sacramento, California 6/25–26)
2013	Des Moines, Iowa	Drake Stadium	June 19–23
2012	Bloomington, Indiana	Billy Hayes Track	June 15–17
2011	Eugene, Oregon	Hayward Field	June 23–26
2010	Des Moines, Iowa	Drake Stadium	June 23–27
2009	Eugene, Oregon	Hayward Field	June 25–28
2008	Columbus, Ohio	Jesse Owens Memorial Stadium	June 20–22
2007	Indianapolis, Indiana	IU Michael A. Carroll Track & Soccer Stadium	June 21–24
2006	Indianapolis, Indiana	IU Michael A. Carroll Track & Soccer Stadium	June 21–24
2005	Carson, California	Home Depot Center	June 23–26
2004	College Station, Texas	Anderson Track & Field Complex	June 25–27
2003	Stanford, California	Cobb Track at Angell Field	June 19–23
2002	Stanford, California	Cobb Track at Angell Field	June 21–22
2001	Richmond, Virginia	Sports Backers Stadium	June 16–17
2000	Denton, Texas	Mean Green Stadium	June 23- 24
1999	Denton, Texas	Mean Green Stadium	June 19- 20
1998	Edwardsville, Illinois	Ralph Korte Stadium	June 19- 20
1997	Edwardsville, Illinois	Ralph Korte Stadium	June 21- 22
1996	Delaware, Ohio	Selby Stadium	June 28-29
1995	Walnut, California	Hilmer Lodge Stadium	June 23- 24
1994	Tallahassee, Florida	Mike Long Track	June 24- 25
1993	Spokane, Washington	Spokane Falls Community College	June 26- 27
1992	Columbus, Ohio	Jesse Owens Track @ Ohio Stadium	July 5- 6
1991	Blaine, Minnesota	National Sports Center	June 21- 23
1990	Fresno, California	Ratcliffe Stadium	June 29- July 1
1989	Columbus, Ohio	Jesse Owens Track @ Ohio Stadium	June 9- 11
1988	Tallahassee, Florida	Mike Long Track	June 23- 25
1987	Tucson, Arizona	Rincon Vista Complex	Hep/ Dec: June 16- 17 June 19- 21
1986	Towson, Maryland	Minnegan Stadium	June 26- 29
1985	Elmhurst, Illinois	York High School	June 21-22
1984	Los Angeles, California	Los Angeles Memorial Coliseum	Hep: June 16- 17, Dec: June 18- 19 June 22-24
1983	University Park, Pennsylvania	Nittany Lion Track	June 25- 26
1982	Bloomington, Indiana (men) Los Angeles, California (women)	Billy Hayes Track (men) Elvin C. "Ducky" Drake Stadium (women)	June 14- 15 (men) June 30- July 1 (women)
1981	Knoxville, Tennessee (men) Los Angeles, California (women)	Tom Black Track (men) Elvin C. Ducky Drake Stadium (women)	June 12- 13 (men) June 30- July 1 (women)
1980	Knoxville, Tennessee	Tom Black Track	June 16- 17
1979	Bloomington, Indiana	Billy Hayes Track	June 23- 24
1978	Bloomington, Indiana	Billy Hayes Track	June 24- 25
1977	Knoxville, Tennessee (men) Los Angeles, California (women)	Tom Black Track (men) Elvin C. "Ducky" Drake Stadium (women)	June 17- 18 (men) June 13- 14 (women)
1976	Knoxville, Tennessee (men) Los Angeles, California (women)	Tom Black Track (men) Elvin C. "Ducky" Drake Stadium (women)	June 8-9 (men) June 15- 16 (women)
1975	Knoxville, Tennessee (men) White Plains, New York (women)	Tom Black Track (men) Glen D. Loucks Field (women)	June 13- 14 (men) June 27- 28 (women)
1974	Gainesville, Florida	Pearcy Beard Track	June 14- 15
1973	Gainesville, Florida (men) Irvine, California (women)	Pearcy Beard Track (men) UC- Irvine (women)	June 22- 23 (men) June 19- 20 (women)
1972	Lakewood, Colorado (men) Poplar Bluff, Missouri (women)	Jefferson County Stadium (men) Poplar Bluff Stadium	June 23- 24 (men/women)

== Records ==
=== Men ===
Championships records
Event	Record	Athlete	School or club	Date	Location	Ref.
100 m	10.00 (+1.6 m/s)	Trentavis Friday	Cherryville High School	July 5, 2014	Eugene	
200 m	19.94 (+0.8 m/s)	Tate Taylor	John Marshall Harlan High School	June 19, 2026	Eugene	
400 m	44.52	Jayden Deleon	Oakland Mills High School	June 19, 2026	Eugene	
800 m	1:46.97	Vincent Crisp	Texas Tech	June 25, 2016	Clovis	
1500 m	3:42.8 h	Tom Byers	Ohio TC	June 15, 1974	Gainesville	
5000 m	13:55.65	John Zishka	Lancaster High School	June 17, 1980	Knoxville	
10,000 m	29:11.2 h	Rudy Chapa Eric Hulst	Hammond High School Laguna Beach High School	June 13, 1975	Knoxville	
110 m hurdles (99 cm)	12.95 (−0.6 m/s)	Leezra Brown	Georgia Bulldogs	June 19, 2026	Eugene	
400 m hurldes	49.20	Kennen Davis	Archbishop Carroll High School	June 19, 2026	Eugene	
2000 m steeplechase	5:50.66	Brian Lenihan	Dartmouth	Towson	June 29, 1986	
3000 steeplechase	8:48.17	Wyatt Haughton	BYU	June 12, 2024	Eugene	
10K Walk	42:50.20	Ben Shorey	Wisc.-Parkside	Stanford	June 21, 2002	
HJ	2.27 m (7 ft 5 1/4 in)	Kevin Clements	Illinois State	Columbus	June 11, 1989	
PV	5.55 m (18 ft 2 1/2 in)	Zach Bradford	Kansas	Bloomington	June 15, 2018	
LJ	8.17 m (26 ft 9 1/2 in)	James Stallworth	Tulare Union High School	Fresno	June 30, 1990	
TJ	16.83 m (55 ft 2 1/2 in)	Will Claye	Oklahoma	Eugene	June 28, 2009	
SP	19.67 m (64 ft 6 1/4 in)	Michael Carter	Metro Speedsters	Bloomington	June 22, 1979	
SP (6kg)	21.90 m (71 ft 10 in)	John Maurins	Wake Forest	Eugene	June 25, 2015	
DT	58.14 m (190 ft 8 3/4 in)	Casey Malone	Arvada West High School	Delaware	June 28, 1996	
DT (1.75kg)	63.01 m (206 ft 8 1/2 in)	Rodney Brown	LSU	Bloomington	June 17, 2012	
HT	65.01 m (213 ft 3 1/4 in)	Jake Freeman	Bishop Hendricken High School	Denton	June 20, 1999	
HT (6kg)	78.28 m (256 ft 9 3/4 in)	Conor McCullough	Princeton	Des Moines	June 25, 2010	
JT	72.65 m (238 ft 4 in)	Joe Zimmerman	unattached	Des Moines	June 25, 2010	
Decathlon	7599 pts	Curtis Beach	Albuquerque TC	Eugene	June 26, 2009	
Decathlon; Junior implements	8016 pts	Kevin Lazas	Arkansas	Eugene	June 24, 2011	

=== Women ===
Championships records
Event	Record	Athlete	School or club	Date	Location	Ref.
100 m	11.08 (+0.8 m/s)	Mia Maxwell	Humble High School	June 18, 2026	Eugene	
200 m	22.48 (±0.0 m/s)	Shawnti Jackson	Run U Xpress	July 9, 2023	Eugene	
400 m	50.69	Sanya Richards	St. Thomas Aquinas High School	June 22, 2002	Stanford	
800 m	1:59.04	Juliette Whitaker	Maryland High School	June 25, 2022	Eugene	
1500 m	4:04.59	Claire Stegall	University of Florida	June 19, 2026	Eugene	
3000 m	9:10.51	Kate Murphy	Lake Braddock Secondary School	June 25, 2016	Clovis	
5000 m	15:46.74	Mia Sirois	Barrington, Ill	June 18, 2026	Eugene	
10,000 m	34:22.32	Carole Zajac	Villanova	June 23, 1991	Blaine	
100 m hurdles	12.84	Tia Jones	Walton High School	June 25, 2016	Clovis	
400 m hurdles	54.54	Sydney McLaughlin	Union Catholic Regional High School	June 25, 2016	Clovis	
3000 m steeplechase	10:08.30	Sierra Wall	Colorado School of Mines	June 18, 2026	Eugene	
High jump	1.90 m (6 ft 2 3/4 in)	Erin Aldrich	Lake Highlands High School	June 28, 1996	Delaware	
Pole vault	4.45 m (14 ft 7 in)	Hannah Grace	University of Tennessee	June 18, 2026	Eugene	
Long jump	6.72 m (22 ft 1/2 in) (+0.7 m/s)	Alyssa Jones	Stanford	July 8, 2023	Eugene	
Triple jump	13.71 m (44 ft 11 3/4 in)	Brittany Daniels	Merrill West High School	June 27, 2004	College Station	
Shot put	17.57 m (57 ft 7 1/2 in)	Laura Gerraughty	North Carolina	June 22, 2002	Stanford	
Discus throw	60.59 m (198 ft 9 1/4 in)	Shelbi Vaughan	Mansfield Legacy High School	June 15, 2012	Bloomington	
Hammer throw	68.12 m (223 ft 5 3/4 in)	Shelby Ashe	Throw 1 Deep	June 16, 2012	Bloomington	
Javelin throw	54.28 m (178 ft 1 in)	Dana Baker	Olathe North High School	June 15, 2018	Bloomington	
Heptathlon	5660 pts	Anna Hall	Valor Christian High School	June 15–16, 2018	Bloomington	
10,000 m walk	48:24.61	Taylor Ewert	Beavercreek High School	23 June 2019	Miramar	
