= Nishion Ebanks =

Jamaican athlete (born 2000)

Personal information
- Born: 13 April 2000 (age 26)

Sport
- Sport: Athletics
- Event: Sprint

Achievements and titles
- Personal best(s): 60 m: 6.54 s (2025); 100 m: 9.99 s (2026)

Nishion Ebanks (born 13 April 2000) is a Jamaican sprinter.

== Biography ==
Ebanks is a member of the MVP Track Club based in Jamaica and ran by sprint coach Paul Francis. He ran a personal best for the 100 metres of 10.32 seconds at the 2023 Jamaican Track and Field Championships in Kingston, Jamaica.

In January 2025, he set a 60 metres personal best of 6.54 seconds at the Central Hurdles, Relays & Field Events Meet at the GC Foster College in St. Catherine. This came despite the race being run into a -2.1 m/s headwind.

On 1 March 2025, he placed second in the 60 metres final at the Jamaican World Athletics Indoor Championships qualifier at GC Foster College in a time of 6.57 seconds. He was named in the Jamaican team for the 2025 World Athletics Indoor Championships in Nanjing in March 2025.

Ebanks ran 6.59 seconds for the 60 metres (+1.4) at the 2026 Gibson McCook Relays in Kingston. Having lowered his personal best to 10.18 seconds in the semi-final, Ebanks placed fourth in the 100 metres final at the senior Jamaican Athletics Championships on 19 June 2026, with a time of 9.99 seconds. He was named in the Jamaica team for the 2026 Commonwealth Games.
