= Ansin Sports Complex =

Sports venue in Miramar, Florida

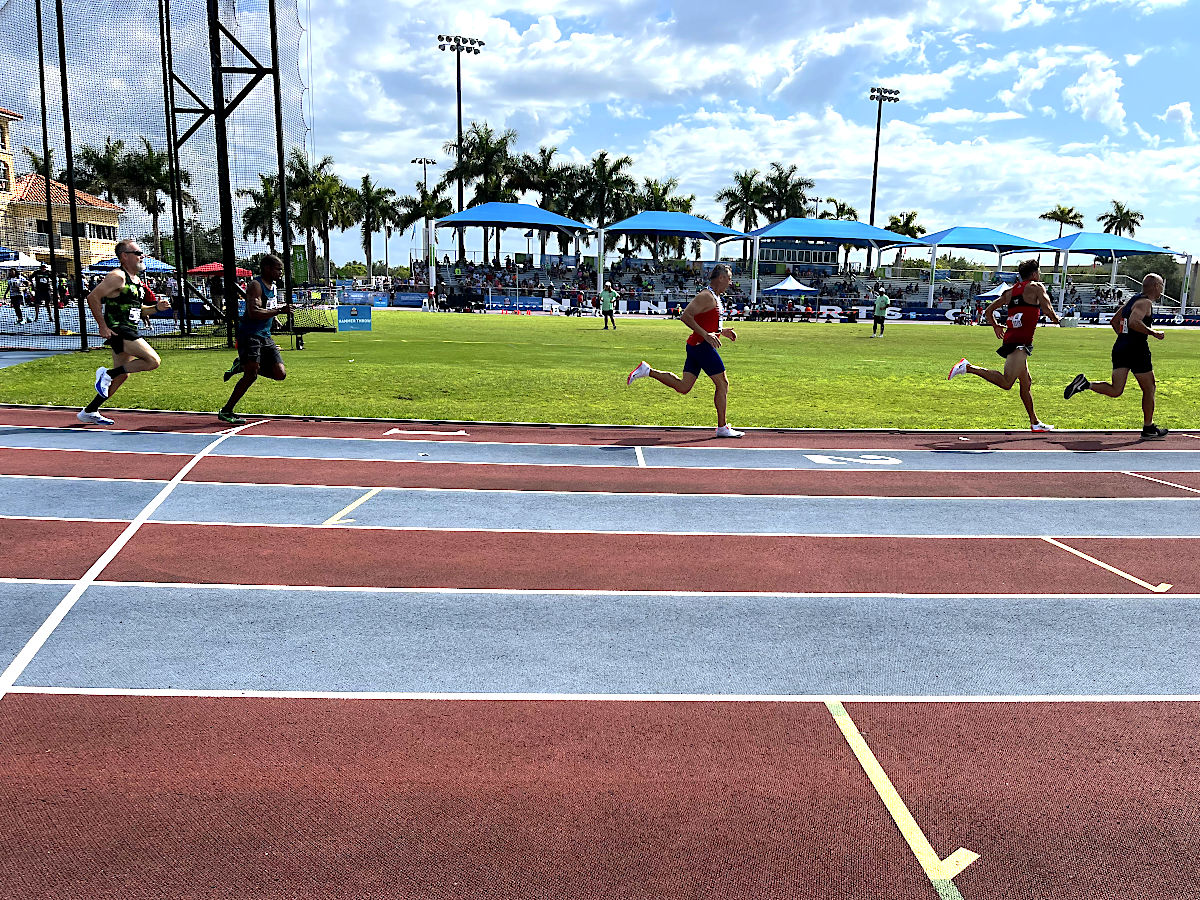
- Interactive map of Ansin Sports Complex
- Location: Miramar, Florida, U.S.
- Coordinates: 25.987917°N 80.291056°W
- Owner: City of Miramar
- Capacity: 5,000+
- Event: athletics

Construction
- Opened: February 2009; 17 years ago

Website
- miramarfl.gov/Rental-Facilities/Ansin-Sports-Complex

Ansin Sports Complex is a multi-sport complex located in Miramar, Florida. The track and field venue is one of only four Class 2 internationally certified tracks in the United States.

The facility, which opened in February 2009, was made possible through a donation of land and money by brothers Ron and Edmund Ansin, in memory of their parents, Sophie and Sidney Ansin. The Ansin family owns Sunbeam Television and local television station WSVN.

== Major competitions ==
- 2011 Pan American Junior Athletics Championships
- 2019 USATF U20 Outdoor Championships
- 2022 National Senior Games
- 2025 Hoot'N Bulldog Track Ultra
