= List of North, Central American and Caribbean under-20 records in athletics =

North, Central American and Caribbean Junior records in athletics are the best marks set in an event by an athlete who has not yet reached their 20th birthday in the given year of competition, competing for a member nation of the North American, Central American and Caribbean Athletic Association (NACAC). NACAC doesn't maintain an official list for such performances. All bests shown on this list are tracked by statisticians not officially sanctioned by the governing body.

== Outdoor ==
Not ratified or later rescinded by World Athletics

=== Men ===
Event	Record	Athlete	Nationality	Date	Meet	Place	Age	Ref.	Video
100 m	9.92 (+1.1 m/s)	Tate Taylor	United States	3 May 2025	UIL State Championships	Austin, United States	17 years, 219 days		
100 m	9.92 (+1.8 m/s)	Maurice Gleaton	United States	1 August 2025	USA Championships	Eugene, United States	18 years, 248 days		
200 m	19.49 (+1.4 m/s)	Erriyon Knighton	United States	30 April 2022	LSU Invitational	Baton Rouge, United States	18 years, 91 days		
300 m	32.49	Henry Thomas	United States	23 July 1985		Edinburgh, United Kingdom	18 years, 13 days		
400 m	43.87	Steve Lewis	United States	28 September 1988	Olympic Games	Seoul, South Korea	19 years, 135 days		
800 m	1:42.08	Cooper Lutkenhaus	United States	10 June 2026	Bislett Games	Oslo, Norway	17 years, 173 days		
1000 m	2:16.46	Hobbs Kessler	United States	10 August 2022	Herculis	Fontvielle, Monaco	19 years, 147 days		
1500 m	3:34.36	Hobbs Kessler	United States	29 May 2021	Portland Track Festival	Portland, United States	18 years, 74 days		
Mile	3:51.3 h	Jim Ryun	United States	17 July 1966		Berkeley, United States	19 years, 79 days		
3000 m	7:49.16	Galen Rupp	United States	17 July 2005		Lignano Sabbiadoro, Italy	19 years, 70 days		
5000 m	13:24.26	Nico Young	United States	23 April 2021	Drake Relays	Des Moines United States	18 years, 270 days		
10,000 m	28:15.52	Galen Rupp	United States	7 May 2005	Oregon Twilight Meet	Eugene, United States	18 years, 364 days		
10 km (road)	28:56	Colin Baker	United States	15 November 2019	NCAA Division I Northeast Region Cross Country Championships	Buffalo, United States	Exact age unknown		
Half marathon	1:04:32	Alejandro Cuatepitzi	Mexico	3 October 1999	World Half Marathon Championships	Palermo, Italy	18 years, 307 days		
110 m hurdles (99 cm)	12.72 (+0.7 m/s)	Le'Ezra Brown	United States	8 August 2026	World U20 Championships	Eugene, United States	19 years, 155 days		
110 m hurdles (106.7 cm)	13.18 (+0.4 m/s)	Ja'Kobe Tharp	United States	11 May 2024	SEC Championships	Gainesville, United States	18 years, 224 days		
110 m hurdles (106.7 cm)	13.18 (+0.2 m/s)	Ja'Kobe Tharp	United States	5 June 2024	NCAA Division I Championships	Eugene, United States	18 years, 249 days		
300 m hurdles	34.72	Andrew Jones	United States	17 April 2026	UIL 6A Area Championships	Tomball, United States			
400 m hurdles	47.85	Sean Burrell	United States	11 June 2021	NCAA Division I Championships	Eugene, United States	19 years, 108 days		
400 m hurdles	47.85	Roshawn Clarke	Jamaica	7 July 2023	Jamaican Championships	Kingston, Jamaica	19 years, 6 days		
2000 m steeplechase	5:35.99	Ángel Rodríguez	Cuba	20 July 1986	World Junior Championships	Athens, Greece	18 years, 279 days		
3000 m steeplechase	8:33.8 h	John Gregorek	United States	20 May 1979	Penn Relays	Philadelphia, United States	19 years, 35 days		
High jump	2.36 m	Javier Sotomayor	Cuba	23 February 1986		Santiago de Cuba, Cuba	18 years, 133 days		
Pole vault	5.75 m	Christopher Nilsen	United States	24 June 2017	USA Championships	Sacramento, United States	19 years, 162 days		
Long jump	8.46 m (+1.9 m/s)	Jorge A. Hodelín	Cuba	13 June 2026	Envol Trophée	Pierre-Bénite, France	19 years, 28 days		
Triple jump	17.87 m (+1.3 m/s)	Jaydon Hibbert	Jamaica	13 May 2023	SEC Championships	Baton Rouge, United States	18 years, 116 days		
Shot put (6 kg)	22.06 m	Adrian Piperi	United States	10 July 2018	World U20 Championships	Tampere, Finland	19 years, 171 days		
Shot put (7.26 kg)	20.65 m	Michael Carter	United States	4 July 1979		Boston, United States	18 years, 248 days		
Discus throw (1.750 kg)	66.88 m	Traves Smikle	Jamaica	31 March 2011	Inter-Secondary Schools Boys and Girls Championships	Kingston, Jamaica	18 years, 328 days		
Discus throw (2 kg)	63.22 m	Brian Milne	United States	28 March 1992		State College, United States	19 years, 81 days		
Hammer throw (6 kg)	80.79 m	Conor McCullough	United States	25 July 2010	World Junior Championships	Moncton, Canada	19 years, 175 days		
Hammer throw (7.26 kg)	73.73 m	Walter Henning	United States	24 May 2008	High Performance Sprint and Power Meet	Provo, United States	19 years, 121 days		
Javelin throw	84.58 m	Keshorn Walcott	Trinidad and Tobago	11 August 2012	Olympic Games	London, United Kingdom	19 years, 131 days		
Decathlon (Senior implements)	8257pts	Yordani García	Cuba	31 August - 1 September 2007	World Championships	Osaka, Japan	18 years, 284 days		
Decathlon (Senior implements)	100m (wind) / Long jump (wind) / Shot put / High jump / 400m / 110m H (wind) / Discus / Pole vault / Javelin / 1500m; 10.73 (+0.7 m/s) / 7.15 m (+0.2 m/s) / 14.94 m / 2.09 m / 49.25 / 14.08 (−0.2 m/s) / 42.91 m / 4.70 m / 68.74 m / 4:55.42								
5000 m walk (track)	19:34.07	Osvaldo Miramontes	Mexico	8 August 2026	World U20 Championships	Eugene, United States	17 years, 360 days		
10,000 m walk (track)	39:27.10	Emiliano Barba	Mexico	30 August 2024	World U20 Championships	Lima, Peru	17 years, 160 days		
10 km walk (road)	39:22	Alberto Cruz	Mexico	6 April 1990	Semana Internacional de Caminata	León, Mexico	17 years, 304 days		
20 km walk (road)	1:19:02	Eder Sánchez	Mexico	23 April 2005	IAAF World Race Walking Challenge	Cixi, China	18 years, 337 days		
4 × 100 m relay	38.16	Blake Hamilton; Dillon Mitchell; Kyler Brown; Tate Taylor	United States	9 August 2026	World U20 Championships	Eugene, United States	18 years, 347 days 16 years, 248 days 19 years, 183 days 18 years, 317 days		
4 × 400 m relay	2:59.30	Frederick Lewis; Matthew Boling; Matthew Moorer; Justin Robinson	United States	21 July 2019	Pan American U20 Championships	San José, Costa Rica	19 years, 1 day 19 years, 155 days 17 years, 113 days		

=== Women ===
Event	Record	Athlete	Nationality	Date	Meet	Place	Age	Ref.
100 m	10.75 (+1.6 m/s)	Sha'Carri Richardson	United States	8 June 2019	NCAA Division I Championships	Austin, United States	19 years, 75 days	
200 m	22.08 (+1.0 m/s)	JaMeesia Ford	United States	6 June 2024	NCAA Division I Championships	Eugene, United States	19 years, 132 days	
300 m	37.08	Symone Mason	United States	11 February 2017	Hallandale All-Comers Meet	Hallandale Beach, United States	17 years, 164 days	
400 m	49.57	Athing Mu	United States	12 June 2021	NCAA Division I Championships	Eugene, United States	19 years, 4 days	
600 m	1:25.22	Sophia Gorriaran	United States	30 April 2022	Penn Relays	Philadelphia, United States	16 years, 314 days	
800 m	1:55.04	Athing Mu	United States	21 August 2021	Prefontaine Classic	Eugene, United States	19 years, 74 days	
1500 m	4:03.39	Alexa Efraimson	United States	30 May 2015	Prefontaine Classic	Eugene, United States	18 years, 99 days	
Mile	4:23.50	Jane Hedengren	United States	5 June 2025	HOKA Festival of Miles	St. Louis	18 years, 255 days	
3000 m	8:40.03	Jane Hedengren	United States	21 June 2025	Nike Outdoor Nationals	Eugene, United States	18 years, 271 days	
Two miles	9:17.75	Jane Hedengren	United States	8 June 2025	Brooks PR Invitational	Renton, United States	18 years, 258 days	
5000 m	14:57.93	Jane Hedengren	United States	17 April 2025	Bryan Clay Invitational	Azusa, United States	18 years, 206 days	
10,000 m	32:08.83	Rylee Blade	United States	11 June 2026	NCAA Division I Championships	Eugene, United States	18 years, 350 days	
10 km (road)	34:18	Allison Woodward	United States	11 June 2011	Bellin Run	Green Bay, United States	18 years, 148 days	
Half marathon	1:13:04	Kelly Cordell	United States	3 February 2002	Las Vegas Half Marathon	Las Vegas, United States	18 years, 183 days	
Marathon	2:31:49	Tierney Wolfgram	United States	7 November 2020	Parkway Marathon	Sacramento, United States	17 years, 181 days	
100 m hurdles	12.71 (+1.3 m/s)	Britany Anderson	Jamaica	24 July 2019	Motonet Grand Prix	Joensuu, Finland	18 years, 174 days	
300 m hurdles	38.90	Sydney McLaughlin	United States	8 April 2017	Arcadia Invitational	Arcadia, United States	17 years, 244 days	
400 m hurdles	53.60	Sydney McLaughlin	United States	27 April 2018	National Relay Championships	Fayetteville, United States	18 years, 263 days	
400 m hurdles	52.75 (Note: Mark was not ratified by World Athletics (known then as the IAAF) as a world under-20 record due to the lack of false start detection.)	Sydney McLaughlin	United States	13 May 2018	SEC Championships	Knoxville, United States	18 years, 279 days	
2000 m steeplechase	6:19.75	Angelina Napoleon	United States	27 May 2023	Section 6 Class C Championships	Jamestown, United States		
3000 m steeplechase	9:44.62	Charlotte Prouse	Canada	22 July 2016	World U20 Championships	Bydgoszcz, Poland	19 years, 164 days	
High jump	1.99 m	Vashti Cunningham	United States	23 June 2017	USA Championships	Sacramento, United States	19 years, 156 days	
Pole vault	4.65 m	Hana Moll	United States	21 August 2023	World Championships	Budapest, Hungary	18 years, 202 days	
Long jump	6.86 m (+0.1 m/s)	Alyssa Jones	United States	8 June 2023	NCAA Division I Championships	Austin, United States	19 years, 122 days	
Long jump	6.86 m (+1.0 m/s)	Sophia Beckmon	United States	4 May 2024	Fighting Illini Tune-Up	Champaign, United States	18 years, 261 days	
Triple jump	14.53 m (+0.5 m/s)	Leyanis Perez	Cuba	29 June 2021	José Antonio Cansino Memorial	Castellón, Spain	19 years, 170 days	
Shot put	18.78 m	Yumileidi Cumbá	Cuba	10 June 1994		Camagüey, Cuba	19 years, 119 days	
Discus throw	63.60 m	Hilda Ramos	Cuba	19 May 1983		Havana, Cuba	18 years, 260 days	
Hammer throw	68.98 m	Ayamey Damiana Medina	Cuba	27 May 2016		Havana, Cuba	18 years, 96 days	
Javelin throw	63.86 m	Yulenmis Aguilar	Cuba	2 August 2015	Pan American Junior Championships	Edmonton, Canada	18 years, 364 days	
Heptathlon	6231 pts	Yorgelis Rodríguez	Cuba	21–22 February 2014		Havana, Cuba	19 years, 28 days	
Heptathlon	100m H (wind) / High jump / Shot put / 200m (wind) / Long jump (wind) / Javelin / 800m; 14.01 (−1.5 m/s) / 1.84 m / 14.21 m / 24.93 (+1.2 m/s) / 6.03 m (±0.0 m/s) / 47.58 m / 2:17.93							
5000 m walk (track)	22:16.91 Mx	Rachelle De Orbeta	Puerto Rico	17 March 2017		San Juan, Puerto Rico	16 years, 355 days	
5000 m walk (track)	22:17.85 Wo	Alejandra Ortega	Mexico	8 July 2011	World Youth Championships	Lille, France	17 years, 0 days	
5 km walk (road)	23:44+	Maria Michta	United States	8 May 2005		Lima, Peru	18 years, 319 days	
5 km walk (road)	23:44	Maria Michta	United States	3 April 2005		Hauppauge, United States	18 years, 284 days	
10,000 m walk (track)	44:13.88	Alegna González	Mexico	14 July 2018	World U20 Championships	Tampere, Finland	19 years, 193 days	
10 km walk (road)	44:50	Rachelle De Orbeta	Puerto Rico	10 February 2019	Oceania Race Walking Championships	Adelaide, Australia	18 years, 320 days	
15 km walk (road)	1:22:05	Maria Michta	United States	June 4, 2005		Niagara Falls, United States	18 years, 346 days	
20 km walk (road)	1:31:48	Valeria Ortuño	Mexico	8 April 2017	EA Race Walking Permit Meeting	Poděbrady, Czech Republic	18 years, 316 days	
4 × 100 m relay	42.59 A	Serena Cole; Tina Clayton; Kerrica Hill; Tia Clayton	Jamaica	5 August 2022	World U20 Championships	Cali, Colombia	18 years, 40 days 17 years, 353 days 17 years, 352 days	
4 × 100 m relay	42.58 (Note: all team members were not subjected to doping control after the race)	Serena Cole; Tina Clayton; Brianna Lyston; Tia Clayton	Jamaica	17 April 2022	CARIFTA Games	Kingston, Jamaica	17 years, 295 days 17 years, 243 days 17 years, 328 days 17 years, 243 days	
4 × 400 m relay	3:24.04	Alexis Holmes; Kimberly Harris; Ziyah Holman; Kayla Davis	United States	21 July 2019	Pan American U20 Championships	San José, Costa Rica	19 years, 174 days 17 years, 10 days 17 years, 201 days 15 years, 212 days	

=== Mixed ===
Event	Record	Athlete	Nation	Date	Meet	Place	Age	Ref.
4 × 100 m relay	41.39	Cy Lugo; Ahlayna Taylor; Nicholas Altheimer; Ava Kitchings	United States	8 August 2026	World U20 Championships	Eugene, United States	18 years, 9 days 16 years, 276 days 19 years, 136 days 18 years, 161 days	
4 × 400 m relay	3:15.31	Joshua Shelton; Taylor-Nicole Overton; Jaelen Hunter; Olivia Harris	United States	5 August 2026	World U20 Championships	Eugene, United States	18 years, 37 days 17 years, 68 days 17 years, 70 days 17 years, 273 days	

== Indoor ==
=== Men ===
Event	Record	Athlete	Nationality	Date	Meet	Place	Age	Ref.	Video
50 m	5.67	Kareem Kelly	United States	19 February 2000	Los Angeles Invitational	Los Angeles, United States	18 years, 324 days		
55 m	6.07	Leonard Scott	United States	20 February 1999		Gainesville, United States	19 years, 32 days		
60 m	6.52	D'Angelo Cherry	United States	1 March 2009	USA Championships	Boston, United States	18 years, 212 days		
200 m	20.37	Walter Dix	United States	12 March 2005		Fayetteville, United States	19 years, 39 days		
300 m	32.10	Sidi Njie	United States	10 January 2026	Clemson Invitational	Clemson, United States	18 years, 324 days		
400 m	44.62	Jonathan Simms	United States	10 January 2026	Clemson Invitational	Clemson, United States	19 years, 2 days		
500 m	1:00.22	Quincy Wilson	United States	28 February 2026	the CIRCUIT Philly	Philadelphia, United States	18 years, 51 days		
600 m	1:14.15	Cooper Lutkenhaus	United States	1 February 2026	Millrose Games	New York City, United States	17 years, 44 days		
800 m	1:44.03	Cooper Lutkenhaus	United States	14 February 2026	Sound Invite	Winston-Salem, United States	17 years, 57 days		
1000 m	2:19.53	Robby Creese	United States	14 January 2012	Nittany Lion Challenge	State College, United States	18 years, 137 days		
1500 m	3:41.17+	Hobbs Kessler	United States	6 February 2022	New Balance Indoor Grand Prix	Staten Island, United States	18 years, 328 days		
Mile	3:55.02	German Fernandez	United States	28 February 2009	Big 12 Championships	College Station, United States	18 years, 118 days		
3000 m	7:56.26	Luke Tewalt	United States	28 January 2022	Bob Pollock Invitational	Clemson, United States	19 years, 8 days		
3000 m	7:50.06 OT	Grant Fisher	United States	12 February 2016	Husky Classic	Seattle, United States	18 years, 296 days		
5000 m	13:19.73	Parker Wolfe	United States	3 December 2022	Sharon Colyear-Danville Season Opener	Boston, United States	19 years, 129 days		
55 m hurdles (106.7 cm)	7.04	Kurt Powdar	United States	26 January 2019	Bullis Speed Invitational	New York City, United States	17 years, 329 days		
60 m hurdles (99/100 cm)	7.40	Trey Cunningham	United States	12 March 2017	New Balance National Scholastic Championships	New York City, United States	18 years, 198 days		
60 m hurdles (106.7 cm)	7.55	Leonard Mustari	United States	11 February 2022	Tiger Paw Invitational	Clemson, United States	19 years, 29 days		
High jump	2.30 m	Javier Sotomayor	Cuba	18 January 1985	IAAF World Indoor Games	Paris, France	17 years, 97 days		
Pole vault	5.70 m	Chris Nilsen	United States	10 February 2017	Tyson Invitational	Fayetteville, United States	19 years, 28 days		
Pole vault	5.70 m	Chris Nilsen	United States	10 March 2017	NCAA Division I Championships	College Station, United States	19 years, 56 days		
Long jump	8.05 m	Dion Bentley	United States	14 January 1990		Gainesville, United States	18 years, 141 days		
Triple jump	17.07 m	Jordan Díaz	Cuba	19 February 2020	Meeting Hauts de France Pas de Calais	Liévin, France	18 years, 361 days		
Shot put (6 kg)	21.89 m	Jordan Geist	United States	7 February 2017		Greensburg, United States	18 years, 201 days		
Shot put (7.26 kg)	21.05 m	Terry Albritton	United States	22 February 1974		New York City, United States	19 years, 39 days		
Weight throw	22.16 m	Brent Fairbanks	United States	24 February 2018	GLIAC Championships	Allendale, United States	18 years, 283 days		
Heptathlon (Junior)									
Heptathlon (Junior)	60m / Long jump / Shot put / High jump / 60m H / Pole vault / 1000m								
Heptathlon (Senior)	6022 pts	Gunnar Nixon	United States	27–28 January 2012	Razorback Invitational	Fayetteville, United States	19 years, 15 days		
Heptathlon (Senior)	60m / Long jump / Shot put / High jump / 60m H / Pole vault / 1000m; 7.10 / 7.53 m / 13.97 m / 2.15 m / 8.21 m / 4.50 m / 2:40.15								
5000 m walk									
4 × 400 m relay	3:09.44	Bullis School; Cameron Homer; Alexander Lambert; Colin Abrams; Quincy Wilson	United States	16 March 2025	New Balance Nationals Indoor	Boston, United States	17 years, 67 days		
4 × 800 m relay	7:36.99	Albemarle High School; Zach Vrhovac; Luke Noble; Garrett Bradley; Anthony Kostelac	United States	15 March 2009	New Balance Nationals Indoor	Roxbury Crossing, United States	17 years, 243 days 18 years, 160 days 17 years, 208 days 17 years, 254 days		

=== Women ===
Event	Record	Athlete	Nationality	Date	Meet	Place	Age	Ref.
50 m	6.24+	Adaejah Hodge	British Virgin Islands	12 January 2024	VA Showcase	Virginia Beach, United States	17 years, 305 days	
55 m	6.68 A	Aleisha Latimer	United States	16 January 1996		Boulder, United States	16 years, 281 days	
60 m	7.07 A	Kaila Jackson	United States	10 March 2023	NCAA Division I Championships	Albuquerque, United States	18 years, 253 days	
200 m	22.33	Adaejah Hodge	British Virgin Islands	12 March 2023	New Balance Nationals	Boston, United States	16 years, 364 days	
300 m	35.83	JaMeesia Ford	United States	8 December 2023	Clemson Opener	Clemson, United States	18 years, 316 days	
400 m	50.36	Sydney McLaughlin	United States	10 March 2018	NCAA Division I Championships	College Station, United States	18 years, 215 days	
600 m	1:23.57	Athing Mu	United States	24 February 2019	USA Championships	Staten Island, United States	16 years, 261 days	
800 m	1:58.40	Athing Mu	United States	27 February 2021	Southeastern Conference Championships	Fayetteville, United States	18 years, 264 days	
1000 m	2:35.80	Mary Cain	United States	8 February 2014	New Balance Indoor Grand Prix	Roxbury, United States	17 years, 281 days	
1500 m	4:06.63+	Mary Cain	United States	24 January 2014	BU John Thomas Terrier Invitational	Boston, United States	17 years, 266 days	
Mile	4:24.11	Mary Cain	United States	24 January 2014	BU John Thomas Terrier Invitational	Boston, United States	17 years, 266 days	
3000 m	8:54.18	Katelyn Tuohy	United States	4 December 2021	BU Sharon Colyear-Danville Season Opener	Boston United States	19 years, 261 days	
5000 m	14:44.79	Jane Hedengren	United States	6 December 2025	Sharon Colyear-Danville Season Opener	Boston, United States	19 years, 74 days	
55 m hurdles	7.56	Nicole Hoxie	United States	7 February 1998		Norman, United States	18 years, 200 days	
60 m hurdles	7.91	Grace Stark	United States	29 February 2020	SEC Championships	College Station, United States	18 years, 299 days	
60 m hurdles	7.91	Ackera Nugent	Jamaica	25 January 2020	Big 12 Championships	Lubbock, United States	18 years, 303 days	
High jump	1.99 m	Vashti Cunningham	United States	12 March 2016	USA Championships	Portland, United States	18 years, 54 days	
Pole vault	4.64 m	Hana Moll	United States	27 January 2024	UW Invite/Mile City	Seattle, United States	18 years, 361 days	
Long jump	6.74 m A	Alyssa Jones	United States	10 March 2023	NCAA Division I Championships	Albuquerque United States	19 years, 32 days	
Triple jump	13.98 m	Keturah Orji	United States	24 January 2015	Rod McCravy Invitational	Lexington, United States	18 years, 325 days	
Shot put	18.62 m	Raven Saunders	United States	14 March 2015	NCAA Division I Championships	Fayetteville, United States	18 years, 303 days	
Pentathlon	4635 pts A	Kendell Williams	United States	15 March 2014	NCAA Division I Championships	Albuquerque, United States	18 years, 274 days	
Pentathlon	60m H / High jump / Shot put / Long jump / 800m; 8.21 / 1.88 m / 12.05 m / 6.32 m / 2:17.31							
1500 m walk	6:02.85+	Taylor Ewert	United States	9 February 2019	Millrose Games	New York City United States	17 years, 80 days	
Mile walk	6:28.21	Taylor Ewert	United States	9 February 2019	Millrose Games	New York City United States	17 years, 80 days	
3000 m walk	13:00.56	Taylor Ewert	United States	17 January 2020	Virginia Showcase	Lynchburg, United States	18 years, 57 days	
4 × 200 m relay	1:35.86	Long Beach Poly; Shana Solomon; Jasmine Lee; Dominique Dorsey; Shalonda Solomon	United States	16 March 2003		New York City, United States	16 years, 345 days 17 years, 84 days 17 years, 87 days	
4 × 400 m relay	3:38.91	Long Beach Poly; Deshante Harris; Jasmine Lee; Shana Woods; Shalonda Solomon	United States	14 March 2004		New York City, United States	17 years, 190 days 17 years, 344 days 17 years, 251 days 18 years, 86 days	
4 × 800 m relay	8:59.37	Suffern High School; McKenna; Greany; Heidt; Consiglio	United States	12 March 2006		New York City, United States		
4 × 800 m relay	8:53.67 (Note: not recognised by World Athletics)	Boys and Girls High School, Brooklyn; Vargas; Fernandez; Francis; Livingston (Jamaica)	United States	1 March 2002		New York City, United States		
