= List of North, Central American and Caribbean under-23 records in athletics =

North, Central American and Caribbean U-23 records in the sport of athletics are the all-time best marks set in competition by an athlete who competes for a member nation of the North American, Central American and Caribbean Athletics Association (NACAC) by aged 22 or younger throughout the entire calendar year of the performance. Technically, in all under-23 age divisions, the age is calculated "on December 31 of the year of competition" to avoid age group switching during a competitive season. NACAC doesn't maintain an official list for such performances. All bests shown on this list are tracked by statisticians not officially sanctioned by the governing body.

== Outdoor ==
=== Men ===
Event	Record	Athlete	Nationality	Date	Meet	Place	Age	Ref.
100 m	9.69 (±0.0 m/s)	Usain Bolt	Jamaica	16 August 2008	Olympic Games	Beijing, China	21 years, 361 days	
200 m	19.26 (+0.7 m/s)	Yohan Blake	Jamaica	16 September 2011	Memorial Van Damme	Brussels, Belgium	21 years, 264 days	
400 m	43.50	Quincy Watts	United States	5 August 1992	Olympic Games	Barcelona, Spain	22 years, 47 days	
600 m	1:13.80	Earl Jones	United States	24 May 1986		Santa Monica, California, United States	21 years, 311 days	
800 m	1:42.08	Cooper Lutkenhaus	United States	10 June 2026	Bislett Games	Oslo, Norway	17 years, 173 days	
1000 m	2:16.46	Hobbs Kessler	United States	10 August 2022	Herculis	Fontvielle, Monaco	19 years, 147 days	
1500 m								
Mile (road)	3:54.34	Hobbs Kessler	United States	26 April 2025	Adizero: Road to Records	Herzogenaurach, Germany	22 years, 42 days	
3000 m								
5000 m								
10,000 m								
Marathon								
110 m hurdles	12.87 (+0.9 m/s)	Dayron Robles	Cuba	6 June 2008	Golden Spike Ostrava	Ostrava, Czech Republic	20 years, 200 days	
300 m hurdles	34.72	Andrew Jones	United States	17 April 2026	UIL 6A Area Championships	Tomball, United States		
400 m hurdles	47.30	Bershawn Jackson	United States	9 August 2005	World Championships	Helsinki, Finland	22 years, 93 days	
3000 m steeplechase								
High jump								
Pole vault								
Long jump	8.90 m A (+2.0 m/s)	Bob Beamon	United States	18 October 1968	Olympic Games	Mexico City, Mexico	22 years, 50 days	
Triple jump	18.08 m (±0.0 m/s)	Pedro Pablo Pichardo	Cuba	28 May 2015	Copa Cuba-Memorial Barrientos	Havana, Cuba	21 years, 332 days	
Shot put	22.42 m	Randy Barnes	United States	17 August 1988	Athletissima	Zürich, Switzerland	22 years, 62 days	
Discus throw								
Hammer throw	84.38 m	Ethan Katzberg	Canada	20 April 2024	Kip Keino Classic	Nairobi, Kenya	22 years, 15 days	
Javelin throw	90.16 m	Keshorn Walcott	Trinidad and Tobago	9 July 2015	Athletissima	Lausanne, Switzerland	22 years, 98 days	
Decathlon								
Decathlon	100m (wind) / Long jump (wind) / Shot put / High jump / 400m / 110m H (wind) / Discus / Pole vault / Javelin / 1500m							
5000 m walk (track)	19:34.07	Osvaldo Miramontes	Mexico	8 August 2026	World U20 Championships	Eugene, United States	17 years, 360 days	
10,000 m walk (track)	39:27.10	Emiliano Barba	Mexico	30 August 2024	World U20 Championships	Lima, Peru	17 years, 160 days	
20 km walk (road)								
50 km walk (road)								
4 × 100 m relay	38.16	Blake Hamilton; Dillon Mitchell; Kyler Brown; Tate Taylor	United States	9 August 2026	World U20 Championships	Eugene, United States	18 years, 347 days 16 years, 248 days 19 years, 183 days 18 years, 317 days	
4 × 400 m relay	2:56.16 A	Vince Matthews; Ron Freeman; Larry James; Lee Evans	United States	20 October 1968	Olympic Games	Mexico City, Mexico	20 years, 309 days 21 years, 130 days 20 years, 349 days 21 years, 238 days	

=== Women ===
Event	Record	Athlete	Nationality	Date	Meet	Place	Age	Ref.
100 m	10.63 (+1.9 m/s)	Adaejah Hodge	British Virgin Islands	11 June 2026	NCAA Division I Championships	Eugene, United States	20 years, 82 days	
200 m	21.68 (−0.4 m/s)	Adaejah Hodge	British Virgin Islands	13 June 2026	NCAA Division I Championships	Eugene, United States	20 years, 84 days	
400 m								
600 m	1:22.74	Athing Mu	United States	30 April 2022	Penn Relays	Philadelphia, United States	19 years, 326 days	
800 m	1:55.21	Athing Mu	United States	3 August 2021	Olympic Games	Tokyo, Japan	19 years, 56 days	
1000 m	2:31.49	Addison Wiley	United States	31 August 2024	Mityng Ambasadorów Białostockiego i Podlaskiego Sportu	Białystok, Poland	20 years, 312 days	
1500 m								
3000 m	8:40.99+	Jane Hedengren	United States	8 June 2025	Brooks PR Invitational	Renton, United States	18 years, 258 days	
Two miles	9:17.75	Jane Hedengren	United States	8 June 2025	Brooks PR Invitational	Renton, United States	18 years, 258 days	
5000 m								
10,000 m								
Marathon								
100 m hurdles	12.24 (−0.4 m/s)	Ackera Nugent	Jamaica	30 August 2024	Golden Gala	Rome, Italy	22 years, 123 days	
200 m hurdles (straight)	24.86 (+0.1 m/s)	Shiann Salmon	Jamaica	23 May 2021	Adidas Boost Boston Games	Boston, United States	22 years, 53 days	
300 m hurdles	38.90	Sydney McLaughlin	United States	8 April 2017	Arcadia Invitational	Arcadia, United States	17 years, 244 days	
400 m hurdles	51.46	Sydney McLaughlin	United States	4 August 2021	Olympic Games	Tokyo, Japan	22 years, 27 days	
3000 m steeplechase								
High jump								
Pole vault	4.78 m	Amanda Moll	United States	18 May 2025	Big 10 Championships	Eugene, United States	20 years, 107 days	
Long jump								
Triple jump								
Shot put								
Discus throw								
Hammer throw								
Javelin throw								
Heptathlon	6412 pts	Anna Hall	United States	23–24 March 2022	Texas Relays	Austin, United States	21 years, 1 day	
Heptathlon	100m H (wind) / High jump / Shot put / 200m (wind) / Long jump (wind) / Javelin / 800m; 13.41 (+1.6 m/s) / 1.77 m / 13.45 m / 23.81 (−0.1 m/s) / 6.23 m (+0.9 m/s) / 40.98 m / 2:04.61							
5000 m walk								
10 km walk (road)	44:50	Rachelle De Orbeta	Puerto Rico	10 February 2019	Oceania Race Walking Championships	Adelaide, Australia	18 years, 320 days	
20,000 m walk (track)								
4 × 100 m relay	42.94 A	Serena Cole; Tina Clayton; Kerrica Hill; Tia Clayton	Jamaica	22 August 2021	World U20 Championships	Nairobi, Kenya	17 years, 57 days 17 years, 5 days 16 years, 169 days 17 years, 5 days	
4 × 400 m relay								

=== Mixed ===
Event	Record	Athlete	Nation	Date	Meet	Place	Age	Ref.
4 × 100 m relay	41.39	Cy Lugo; Ahlayna Taylor; Nicholas Altheimer; Ava Kitchings	United States	8 August 2026	World U20 Championships	Eugene, United States	18 years, 9 days 16 years, 276 days 19 years, 136 days 18 years, 161 days	
4 × 400 m relay	3:15.31	Joshua Shelton; Taylor-Nicole Overton; Jaelen Hunter; Olivia Harris	United States	5 August 2026	World U20 Championships	Eugene, United States	18 years, 37 days 17 years, 68 days 17 years, 70 days 17 years, 273 days	

== Indoor ==
=== Men ===
Event	Record	Athlete	Nationality	Date	Meet	Place	Age	Ref.
60 m	6.34 A	Christian Coleman	United States	18 February 2018	USA Championships	Albuquerque, United States	21 years, 349 days	
200 m	19.95	Garrett Kaalund	United States	14 March 2026	NCAA Division I Championships	Fayetteville, United States	22 years, 48 days	
300 m	31.87 A	Noah Lyles	United States	4 March 2017	USA Championships	Albuquerque, United States	19 years, 229 days	
400 m	44.49 (Note: Starting blocks did not comply with World Athletics regulations, athlete passed drug test on the day)	Christopher Morales Williams	Canada	24 February 2024	SEC Championships	Fayetteville, United States	19 years, 203 days	
500 m	59.87 (Note: not ratified by USATF)	Brian Herron	United States	3 December 2022	Commonwealth College Opener	Louisville, United States	22 years, 9 days	
500 m	59.82 (Note: not ratified by USATF; time was rejected as a record due to an incorrectly measured track)	Roddie Haley	United States	15 March 1986	NCAA Division I Championships	Oklahoma City, United States	21 years, 99 days	
600 m	1:13.77	Donavan Brazier	United States	24 February 2019	USA Championships	Staten Island, United States	21 years, 325 days	
800 m	1:44.03	Cooper Lutkenhaus	United States	14 February 2026	Sound Invite	Winston-Salem, United States	17 years, 57 days	
1500 m								
3000 m								
5000 m	12:57.17	Nico Young	United States	26 January 2024	John Thomas Terrier Classic	Boston, United States	21 years, 183 days	
55 m hurdles	6.89	Renaldo Nehemiah	United States	20 January 1979		New York City, United States	19 years, 302 days	
60 m hurdles	7.33	Dayron Robles	Cuba	8 February 2008	PSD Bank Meeting	Düsseldorf, Germany	21 years, 81 days	
High jump	2.43 m	Javier Sotomayor	Cuba	4 March 1989	World Championships	Budapest, Hungary	21 years, 142 days	
Pole vault	6.00 m A	Shawnacy Barber	Canada	15 January 2016	Pole Vault Summit	Reno, United States	21 years, 233 days	
Long jump	8.56 m	Carl Lewis	United States	16 January 1982		East Rutherford, New Jersey, United States	20 years, 199 days	
Triple jump								
Shot put	21.72 m	Randy Barnes	United States	6 February 1988		Dallas, United States	21 years, 235 days	
Weight throw	25.66 m	Ryan Johnson	United States	27 February 2026	Big Ten Conference Championships	Indianapolis, United States	21 years, 32 days	
Heptathlon								
Heptathlon	60m / Long jump / Shot put / High jump / 60m H / Pole vault / 1000m							
5000 m walk								
4 × 400 m relay	3:00.77 (Note: Time rejected as a world record as the team members are not of the same nationality)	Zachary Shinnick; Rai Benjamin; Ricky Morgan Jr. Michael Norman	United States; Antigua and Barbuda; United States; United States (USC Trojans)	10 March 2018	NCAA Division I Championships	College Station, United States	20 years, 226 days 20 years, 97 days	
4 × 400 m relay	3:01.39	Ilolo Izu; Robert Grant; Devin Dixon; My'Lik Kerley	United States (Texas A&M Aggies)	10 March 2018	NCAA Division I Championships	College Station, United States	20 years, 286 days 22 years, 38 days	

=== Women ===
Event	Record	Athlete	Nationality	Date	Meet	Place	Age	Ref.
60 m	6.94 A	Julien Alfred	Saint Lucia	11 March 2023	NCAA Division I Championships	Albuquerque, United States	21 years, 274 days	
200 m	22.01 A	Julien Alfred	Saint Lucia	11 March 2023	NCAA Division I Championships	Albuquerque, United States	21 years, 274 days	
300 m	35.80	Abby Steiner	United States	11 December 2021	Cardinal Classic	Louisville, United States	22 years, 17 days	
400 m	50.34	Kendall Ellis	United States	10 March 2018	NCAA Division I Championships	College Station, United States	22 years, 2 days	
600 y	1:16.76 A	Michaela Rose	United States	20 January 2024	Corky Classic	Lubbock, United States	20 years, 221 days	
600 m	1:23.57	Athing Mu	United States	24 February 2019	USA Championships	Staten Island, United States	16 years, 261 days	
800 m								
1500 m								
3000 m								
60 m hurdles	7.72 A	Ackera Nugent	Jamaica	10 March 2023	NCAA Division I Championships	Albuquerque, United States	20 years, 315 days	
High jump								
Pole vault	4.91 m	Amanda Moll	United States	28 February 2025	Big 10 Championships	Indiananpolis, United States	20 years, 28 days	
Long jump								
Triple jump	15.12 m A	Jasmine Moore	United States	11 March 2023	NCAA Division I Championships	Albuquerque, United States	21 years, 314 days	
Shot put								
Weight throw	25.56 m	Brittany Riley	United States	10 March 2007		Fayetteville, United States	20 years, 196 days	
Pentathlon	5004 pts A	Anna Hall	United States	18 February 2023	USA Championships	Albuquerque, United States	21 years, 332 days	
Pentathlon	60m H / High jump / Shot put / Long jump / 800m; 8.04 / 1.91 m / 13.80 m / 6.34 m / 2:05.70							
1500 m walk	6:02.85+	Taylor Ewert	United States	9 February 2019	Millrose Games	New York City United States	17 years, 80 days	
Mile walk	6:28.21	Taylor Ewert	United States	9 February 2019	Millrose Games	New York City United States	17 years, 80 days	
3000 m walk								
4 × 400 m relay	3:26.68 (Note: Time would be rejected as a record as the team members are not of the same nationality)	Jania Martin; Charokee Young; Tierra Robinson-Jones; Athing Mu	United States; Jamaica; United States; United States (Texas A&M Aggies)	13 March 2021	NCAA Division I Championships	Fayetteville, United States	20 years, 204 days 18 years, 278 days	
4 × 400 m relay	3:27.42 A	Briana Nelson; Courtney Okolo; Kendall Baisden; Ashley Spencer	United States (Texas Longhorns)	15 March 2014	NCAA Division I Championships	Albuquerque, United States	20 years, 0 days 19 years, 10 days 20 years, 280 days	
