= List of world under-20 records in athletics =

World U20 records in the sport of athletics are ratified by World Athletics. Athletics records comprise the best performance of an athlete before the year of their 20th birthday. Technically, in all under 20 age divisions, the age is calculated "on December 31 of the year of competition" to avoid age group switching during a competitive season. These age category records were formerly referred to as world junior records.

== Outdoor ==
Key: Awaiting ratification not a World Athletics record event Not ratified or later rescinded by World Athletics

=== Men ===
Event	Record	Athlete	Nationality	Date	Meet	Place	Age	Ref.	Video
100 m	9.91 A (+0.8 m/s)	Letsile Tebogo	Botswana	2 August 2022	World U20 Championships	Cali, Colombia	19 years, 60 days		
100 m	9.89 (+0.8 m/s) (Note: later disqualified due to a doping offence)	Issamade Asinga	Suriname	28 July 2023	South American Championships	São Paulo, Brazil	18 years, 211 days		
150 m	14.96 (±0.0 m/s)	Gout Gout	Australia	16 June 2026	Golden Spike Ostrava	Ostrava, Czech Republic	18 years, 169 days		
200 m	19.67 (+1.7 m/s)	Gout Gout	Australia	12 April 2026	Australian Championships	Sydney, Australia	18 years, 104 days		
200 m	19.49 (+1.4 m/s)	Erriyon Knighton	United States	30 April 2022	LSU Invitational	Baton Rouge, United States	18 years, 91 days		
300 m	31.61	Clarence Munyai	South Africa	28 June 2017	Golden Spike Ostrava	Ostrava, Czech Republic	19 years, 129 days		
400 m	43.87	Steve Lewis	United States	28 September 1988	Olympic Games	Seoul, South Korea	19 years, 135 days		
600 m	1:14.79	Mohamed Ali Gouaned	Algeria	26 March 2021	Algerian Winter Championships	Algiers, Algeria	18 years, 264 days		
800 m	1:41.73	Nijel Amos	Botswana	9 August 2012	Olympic Games	London, United Kingdom	18 years, 147 days		
1000 m	2:14.37	Niels Laros	Netherlands	7 July 2024	FBK Games	Hengelo, Netherlands	19 years, 81 days		
1000 m	2:13.93	Abubaker Kaki	Sudan	22 July 2008	DN Galan	Stockholm, Sweden	19 years, 31 days		
1500 m	3:27.72	Phanuel Koech	Kenya	20 June 2025	Meeting de Paris	Paris, France	18 years, 201 days		
Mile	3:48.06	Reynold Cheruiyot	Kenya	16 September 2023	Prefontaine Classic	Eugene, United States	19 years, 48 days		
Mile (road)	3:54.89	Leonard Kipkemoi Bett	Kenya	8 December 2018	Honolulu Kalakaua Merrie Mile	Honolulu, United States	18 years, 35 days		
2000 m	4:49.68	Niels Laros	Netherlands	8 September 2023	Memorial Van Damme	Brussels, Belgium	18 years, 144 days		
3000 m	7:28.19	Yomif Kejelcha	Ethiopia	27 August 2016	Meeting Areva	Saint-Denis, France	19 years, 26 days		
Two miles	8:08.69	Selemon Barega	Ethiopia	30 June 2019	Prefontaine Classic	Palo Alto, United States	19 years, 161 days		
5000 m	12:43.02	Selemon Barega	Ethiopia	31 August 2018	Memorial Van Damme	Brussels, Belgium	18 years, 223 days		
5 km (road)	12:58	Kuma Girma	Ethiopia	14 December 2024	Al Sharqiyah International 5KM	Al Khobar, Saudi Arabia	19 years, 20 days		
10,000 m	26:41.75	Samuel Wanjiru	Kenya	26 August 2005	Memorial Van Damme	Brussels, Belgium	18 years, 289 days		
10,000 m	26:37.93	Biniam Mehary	Ethiopia	14 June 2024	Ethiopian 10,000m Olympic Trials	Nerja, Spain	17 years, 177 days		
10 km (road)	26:54	Khairi Bejiga	Ethiopia	5 October 2025	tRUNsylvania International 10K Brasov	Brașov, Romania	19 years, 161 days		
10 km (road)	26:46 X	Rhonex Kipruto	Kenya	8 September 2018	Prague Grand Prix	Prague, Czech Republic	18 years, 331 days		
15 km (road)	42:00	Mathew Kimeli	Kenya	1 May 2017	15 km du Puy-en-Velay	Le Puy-en-Velay, France	19 years, 30 days		
10 miles (road)	44:51	Martin Irungu Mathathi	Kenya	12 December 2004	Kosa 10-Miler	Kōsa, Japan	18 years, 353 days		
20 km (road)	56:18+	Samuel Wanjiru	Kenya	11 September 2005	Rotterdam Half Marathon	Rotterdam, Netherlands	18 years, 305 days		
Half marathon	59:16	Samuel Wanjiru	Kenya	11 September 2005	Rotterdam Half Marathon	Rotterdam, Netherlands	18 years, 305 days		
25 km (road)	1:14:19+	Bazu Worku	Ethiopia	5 April 2009	Paris Marathon	Paris, France	18 years, 202 days		
25 km (road)	1:13:21+	Tsegaye Mekonnen	Ethiopia	24 January 2014	Dubai Marathon	Dubai, United Arab Emirates	18 years, 223 days		
30 km (road)	1:28:15+	Tsegaye Mekonnen	Ethiopia	24 January 2014	Dubai Marathon	Dubai, United Arab Emirates	18 years, 223 days		
Marathon	2:04:32	Tsegaye Mekonnen	Ethiopia	24 January 2014	Dubai Marathon	Dubai, United Arab Emirates	18 years, 223 days		
110 m hurdles (99/100 cm)	12.72 A (+1.0 m/s)	Sasha Zhoya	France	21 August 2021	World U20 Championships	Nairobi, Kenya	19 years, 57 days		
110 m hurdles (106.7 cm)	13.12 (+1.6 m/s)	Liu Xiang	China	2 July 2002		Lausanne, Switzerland	18 years, 354 days		
400 m hurdles	47.34	Roshawn Clarke	Jamaica	21 August 2023	World Championships	Budapest, Hungary	19 years, 51 days		
2000 m steeplechase	5:19.99	Meresa Kahsay	Ethiopia	12 July 2013	World Youth Championships	Donetsk, Ukraine	17 years, 50 days		
3000 m steeplechase	7:58.66	Stephen Cherono	Kenya	24 August 2001	Memorial Van Damme	Brussels, Belgium	18 years, 313 days		
High jump	2.37 m	Dragutin Topić	Yugoslavia	12 August 1990		Plovdiv, Bulgaria	19 years, 153 days		
High jump	2.37 m	Steve Smith	Great Britain	20 September 1992		Seoul, South Korea	19 years, 175 days		
Pole vault	6.05 m	Armand Duplantis	Sweden	12 August 2018	European Championships	Berlin, Germany	18 years, 275 days		
Long jump	8.38 m (−0.5 m/s)	Mattia Furlani	Italy	8 June 2024	European Championships	Rome, Italy	19 years, 122 days		
Long jump	8.46 m (+1.9 m/s)	Jorge A. Hodelín	Cuba	13 June 2026	Envol Trophée	Pierre-Bénite, France	19 years, 28 days		
Triple jump	17.66 m (+1.7 m/s)	Jaydon Hibbert	Jamaica	21 July 2023	Herculis	Fontvieille, Monaco	18 years, 185 days		
Triple jump	17.87 m (+1.3 m/s)	Jaydon Hibbert	Jamaica	13 May 2023	SEC Championships	Baton Rouge, United States	18 years, 116 days		
Shot put (6 kg)	23.00 m	Jacko Gill	New Zealand	18 August 2013		Auckland, New Zealand	18 years, 241 days		
Shot put (6 kg)	23.34 m X	Konrad Bukowiecki	Poland	19 July 2016	World U20 Championships	Bydgoszcz, Poland	19 years, 124 days		
Shot put (7.26 kg)	21.14 m	Konrad Bukowiecki	Poland	9 June 2016	Bislett Games	Oslo, Norway	19 years, 84 days		
Discus throw (1.75 kg)	71.37 m	Miká Sosna	Germany	10 June 2022		Schönebeck, Germany	18 years, 362 days		
Discus throw (2 kg)	65.62 m (Note: not recognised by World Athletics)	Werner Reiterer	Australia	15 December 1987		Melbourne, Australia	19 years, 322 days		
Discus throw (2 kg)	65.31 m	Mykyta Nesterenko	Ukraine	3 June 2008		Tallinn, Estonia	17 years, 49 days		
Hammer throw (6 kg)	85.57 m	Ashraf Amgad Elseify	Qatar	14 July 2012	World Junior Championships	Barcelona, Spain	17 years, 145 days		
Hammer throw (7.26 kg)	78.33 m	Olli-Pekka Karjalainen	Finland	5 August 1999	Kalevan kisat	Seinäjoki, Finland	19 years, 151 days		
Javelin throw (800 g)	86.48 m	Neeraj Chopra	India	23 July 2016	World U20 Championships	Bydgoszcz, Poland	18 years, 212 days		
Decathlon (Senior implements)	8397 pts	Torsten Voss	East Germany	6–7 July 1982		Erfurt, East Germany	19 years, 45 days		
Decathlon (Senior implements)	100m (wind) / Long jump (wind) / Shot put / High jump / 400m / 110m H (wind) / Discus / Pole vault / Javelin / 1500m; 10.76 / 7.66m / 14.41m / 2.09m / 48.37 / 14.37 / 41.76m / 4.80m / 62.90m / 4:34.04								
Decathlon (6 kg shot, 1.75 kg discus, 99 cm hurdles)	8514 pts	Hubert Trościanka	Poland	7–8 August 2025	European U20 Championships	Tampere, Finland	19 years, 13 days		
Decathlon (6 kg shot, 1.75 kg discus, 99 cm hurdles)	100m (wind) / Long jump (wind) / Shot put / High jump / 400m / 110m H (wind) / Discus / Pole vault / Javelin / 1500m; 10.74 (−0.7 m/s) / 7.26 m (+0.3 m/s) / 15.48 m / 1.94 m / 46.21 / 14.23 (−2.0 m/s) / 43.36 m / 4.80 m / 68.87 m / 4:28.59								
Icosathlon (6 kg shot, 6 kg hammer, 1.75 kg discus, 99 cm 110 m hurdles)	12,196 pts	Alastair Stanley	Great Britain	6–7 September 2014	IAUM European Championships	Lodi, Italy	19 years, 5 days		
Icosathlon (6 kg shot, 6 kg hammer, 1.75 kg discus, 99 cm 110 m hurdles)	12.06 (+0.4 m/s) (100 m), 5.75 m (−0.5 m/s) (long jump), 27.40 (+0.5 m/s) (200 m hurdles), 12.28 m (shot put), 17:19.60 (5000 m), 2:06.86 (800 m), 1.80 m (high jump), 54.38 (400 m), 33.21 m (hammer), 10:44.08 (3000 m steeplechase), 16.60 (+0.6 m/s) (110 m hurdles), 40.86 m (discus), 24.40 (−1.5 m/s) (200 m), 3.40 m (pole vault), 9:54.44 (3000 m), 59.48 (400 m hurdles), 43.34 m (javelin), 4:31.22 (1500 m), 11.21 m (triple jump), 42:56.48 (10,000 m)								
5000 m walk (track)	18:54.37	Nitin Gupta	India	25 April 2026	24th National Junior Athletics Federation Competition	Bengaluru, India	18 years, 114 days		
5000 m walk (track)	18:40.37	Isaac Beacroft	Australia	8 August 2026	World U20 Championships	Eugene, United States	19 years, 21 days		
10,000 m walk (track)	38:02.68	Isaac Beacroft	Australia	11 December 2025	New South Wales 10000m Walk Championships	Sydney, Australia	18 years, 146 days		
10 km walk (road)	37:44	Wang Zhen	China	18 September 2010	IAAF Race Walking Challenge Final	Beijing, China	19 years, 25 days		
20,000 m walk (track)	1:20:11.72	Li Gaobo	China	2 November 2007		Wuhan, China	18 years, 182 days		
20 km walk (road)	1:17:25	Sergey Shirobokov	Russia	9 June 2018	Russian Race Walking Championships	Cheboksary, Russia	19 years, 113 days		
50 km walk (road)	3:41:10	Zhao Jianguo	China	16 April 2006		Wajima, Japan	18 years, 87 days		
4 × 100 m relay	38.51 A	Mihali Xhotyeni; Sinesipho Dambile; Letlhogonolo Moleyane; Benjamin Richardson	South Africa	22 August 2021	World U20 Championships	Nairobi, Kenya	19 years, 173 days 17 years, 246 days		
4 × 100 m relay	38.16	Blake Hamilton; Dillon Mitchell; Kyler Brown; Tate Taylor	United States	9 August 2026	World U20 Championships	Eugene, United States	18 years, 347 days 16 years, 248 days 19 years, 183 days 18 years, 317 days		
4 × 400 m relay	3:00.33	Zachary Shinnick; Josephus Lyles; Brian Herron; Sean Hooper	United States	23 July 2017	Pan American U20 Championships	Trujillo, Peru	19 years, 1 day		
4 × 400 m relay	2:59.30	Frederick Lewis; Matthew Boling; Matthew Moorer; Justin Robinson	United States	21 July 2019	Pan American U20 Championships	San José, Costa Rica	19 years, 1 day 19 years, 155 days 17 years, 113 days		

=== Women ===
Event	Record	Athlete	Nationality	Date	Meet	Place	Age	Ref.
100 m	10.88 (+2.0 m/s)	Marlies Oelsner	East Germany	1 July 1977		Dresden, East Germany	19 years, 102 days	
100 m	10.75 (+1.6 m/s)	Sha'Carri Richardson	United States	8 June 2019	NCAA Division I Championships	Austin, United States	19 years, 75 days	
200 m	21.81 (+0.8 m/s)	Christine Mboma	Namibia	3 August 2021	Olympic Games	Tokyo, Japan	18 years, 73 days	
200 m	21.78 (+0.6 m/s) (Note: Mark was unratified due to doping control not conducted in compliance with World Athletics rules)	Christine Mboma	Namibia	9 September 2021	Weltklasse Zürich	Zürich, Switzerland	18 years, 110 days	
300 m	36.25	Fatima Yusuf	Nigeria	23 September 1990		Siderno, Italy	19 years, 144 days	
400 m	49.42	Grit Breuer	Germany	27 August 1991	World Championships	Tokyo, Japan	19 years, 192 days	
400 m	49.22 A	Christine Mboma	Namibia	17 April 2021	Namibian Championships	Windhoek, Namibia	17 years, 330 days	
400 m	48.54	Christine Mboma	Namibia	30 June 2021	Irena Szewińska Memorial	Bydgoszcz, Poland	18 years, 39 days	
400 m	49.24 A	Christine Mboma	Namibia	11 April 2021		Lusaka, Zambia	17 years, 324 days	
600 m	1:25.22	Sophia Gorriaran	United States	30 April 2022	Penn Relays	Philadelphia, United States	16 years, 314 days	
800 m	1:54.01	Pamela Jelimo	Kenya	29 August 2008	Weltklasse Zürich	Zürich, Switzerland	18 years, 268 days	
1000 m	2:34.89	Audrey Werro	Switzerland	17 June 2023	Meeting Nikaïa	Nice, France	19 years, 82 days	
1500 m	3:51.34	Lang Yinglai	China	18 October 1997	National Games of China	Shanghai, China	18 years, 57 days	
Mile	4:17.57	Zola Budd	Great Britain	21 August 1985	Weltklasse Zürich	Zürich, Switzerland	19 years, 87 days	
Mile (road)	4:22.54 Wo	Mirriam Cherop	Kenya	8 December 2018	Honolulu Kalakaua Merrie Mile	Honolulu, United States	19 years, 166 days	
2000 m	5:33.15	Zola Budd	Great Britain	13 July 1984		London, United Kingdom	18 years, 48 days	
3000 m	8:28.83	Zola Budd	Great Britain	7 September 1985		Rome, Italy	19 years, 104 days	
Two miles	9:17.75	Jane Hedengren	United States	8 June 2025	Brooks PR Invitational	Renton, United States	18 years, 258 days	
5000 m	14:30.88	Tirunesh Dibaba	Ethiopia	11 June 2004		Bergen, Norway	18 years, 254 days	
5000 m	14:27.33	Aleshign Baweke	Ethiopia	6 June 2025	Golden Gala	Rome, Italy	19 years, 134 days	
5 km (road)	14:15 Mx	Marta Alemayo	Ethiopia	4 April 2026	Urban Trail de Lille	Lille, France	17 years, 361 days	
10,000 m	30:26.50	Linet Masai	Kenya	15 August 2008	Olympic Games	Beijing, China	18 years, 254 days	
10 km (road)	30:21 Wo	Yenenesh Shimeket	Ethiopia	4 October 2026	tRUNsylvania International 10K Brasov	Brașov, Romania	19 years, 237 days	
10 km (road)	30:19 X a (Note: mark was unratified because the course has a 5.5m/km elevation drop, compared to the maximum permitted drop for record eligibility purposes, 1m/km)	Priscah Chesang	Uganda	31 December 2022	San Silvestre Vallecana	Madrid, Spain	19 years, 146 days	
15 km (road)	47:15+	Degitu Azimeraw	Ethiopia	9 February 2018	Ras Al Khaimah Half Marathon	Ras Al Khaimah, United Arab Emirates	19 years, 16 days	
15 km (road)	47:15+	Wudinesh Alemu	Ethiopia	18 October 2026	Vedanta Delhi Half Marathon	New Delhi, India	19 years, 268 days	
10 miles (road)	51:40	Rose Cheruiyot	Kenya	9 April 1995	Cherry Blossom Ten Mile Run	Washington, United States	18 years, 262 days	
20 km (road)	1:03:09+	Wudinesh Alemu	Ethiopia	18 October 2026	Vedanta Delhi Half Marathon	New Delhi, India	19 years, 268 days	
Half marathon	1:06:35	Wudinesh Alemu	Ethiopia	18 October 2026	Vedanta Delhi Half Marathon	New Delhi, India	19 years, 268 days	
Marathon	2:20:59	Shure Demise	Ethiopia	23 January 2015	Dubai Marathon	Dubai, United Arab Emirates	19 years, 2 days	
100 m hurdles	12.71 (+1.3 m/s)	Britany Anderson	Jamaica	24 July 2019	Motonet Grand Prix	Joensuu, Finland	18 years, 174 days	
400 m hurdles	53.60	Sydney McLaughlin	United States	27 April 2018	National Relay Championships	Fayetteville, United States	18 years, 263 days	
400 m hurdles	52.75 (Note: Unratified due to no false start detection)	Sydney McLaughlin	United States	13 May 2018	SEC Championships	Knoxville, United States	18 years, 279 days	
Mile steeplechase	5:06.53	Wosane Asefa	Ethiopia	22 August 2025	Memorial Van Damme	Brussels, Belgium	18 years, 231 days	
2000 m steeplechase	6:07.01	Fancy Cherono	Kenya	1 September 2019	ISTAF Berlin	Berlin, Germany	18 years, 30 days	
3000 m steeplechase	8:58.78	Celliphine Chepteek Chespol	Kenya	26 May 2017	Prefontaine Classic	Eugene, United States	18 years, 64 days	
High jump	2.04 m	Yaroslava Mahuchikh	Ukraine	30 September 2019	World Championships	Doha, Qatar	18 years, 11 days	
Pole vault	4.71 m i	Wilma Murto	Finland	31 January 2016		Zweibrücken, Germany	17 years, 234 days	
Pole vault outdoors	4.64 m	Eliza McCartney	New Zealand	19 December 2015	Auckland Summer Series 7 Meeting	Auckland, New Zealand	19 years, 8 days	
Long jump	7.14 m (+1.1 m/s)	Heike Drechsler	East Germany	4 June 1983		Bratislava, Czechoslovakia	18 years, 170 days	
Triple jump	14.62 m (+1.0 m/s)	Tereza Marinova	Bulgaria	25 August 1996		Sydney, Australia	18 years, 355 days	
Shot put	20.54 m	Astrid Kumbernuss	East Germany	1 July 1989		Orimattila, Finland	19 years, 146 days	
Discus throw	74.40 m	Ilke Wyludda	East Germany	13 September 1988		East Berlin, East Germany	19 years, 169 days	
Hammer throw	77.24 m	Zhang Jiale	China	2 August 2025	Chinese Championships	Quzhou, China	18 years, 284 days	
Javelin throw	71.74 m	Yan Ziyi	China	23 May 2026	Xiamen Diamond League	Xiamen, China	18 years, 1 day	
Heptathlon	6542 pts	Carolina Klüft	Sweden	9–10 August 2002	European Championships	München, Germany	19 years, 189 days	
Heptathlon	100m H (wind) / High jump / Shot put / 200m (wind) / Long jump (wind) / Javelin / 800m; 13.33 (−0.3 m/s) / 1.89 m / 13.16 m / 23.71 (−0.3 m/s) / 6.36 m (+1.1 m/s) / 47.61 m / 2:17.99							
5000 m walk (track)	20:28.05	Tatyana Kalmykova	Russia	12 July 2007		Ostrava, Czech Republic	17 years, 183 days	
5 km walk (road)	21:06	Anisya Kornikova	Russia	10 June 2006		Saransk, Russia	16 years, 230 days	
10,000 m walk (track)	42:47.25	Anežka Drahotová	Czech Republic	23 July 2014	World Junior Championships	Eugene, United States	19 years, 1 day	
10,000 m walk (track)	42:43 h	Svetlana Vasilyeva	Russia	27 February 2011	Russian Winter Walking Championships	Sochi, Russia	18 years, 218 days	
10 km walk (road)	41:57	Gao Hongmiao	China	8 September 1993	National Games of China	Beijing, China	19 years, 144 days	
10 km walk (road)	41:52	Tatyana Mineyeva	Russia	5 September 2009		Penza, Russia	19 years, 26 days	
10 km walk (road)	41:55	Irina Stankina	Russia	11 February 1995		Adler, Russia	17 years, 323 days	
20,000 m walk (track)	1:29:32.4	Song Hongjuan	China	24 October 2003		Changsha, Japan	19 years, 112 days	
20 km walk (road)	1:25:29	Glenda Morejón	Ecuador	8 June 2019	Gran Premio Cantones de Marcha	A Coruña, Spain	19 years, 9 days	
4 × 100 m relay	42.59 A	Serena Cole; Tina Clayton; Kerrica Hill; Tia Clayton	Jamaica	5 August 2022	World U20 Championships	Cali, Colombia	18 years, 40 days 17 years, 352 days 17 years, 152 days 17 years, 352 days	
4 × 100 m relay	42.58	Serena Cole; Tina Clayton; Brianna Lyston; Tia Clayton	Jamaica	17 April 2022	CARIFTA Games	Kingston, Jamaica	17 years, 295 days 17 years, 243 days 17 years, 328 days 17 years, 243 days	
4 × 400 m relay	3:27.60	Alexandria Anderson; Ashlee Kidd; Stephanie Smith; Natasha Hastings	United States	18 July 2004	World Junior Championships	Grosseto, Italy	17 years, 172 days 18 years, 358 days 19 years, 21 days 17 years, 361 days	
4 × 400 m relay	3:24.04	Alexis Holmes; Kimberly Harris; Ziyah Holman; Kayla Davis	United States	21 July 2019	Pan American U20 Championships	San José, Costa Rica	19 years, 174 days 17 years, 10 days 17 years, 201 days 15 years, 212 days	

=== Mixed ===
Event	Record	Athlete	Nation	Date	Meet	Place	Age	Ref.
4 × 100 m relay	41.21	Edwin Fermin Galvan; Elisa Valensin; Francesco Pagliarini; Kelly Doualla	Italy	8 August 2026	World U20 Championships	Eugene, United States	18 years, 100 days 19 years, 219 days 19 years, 5 days 16 years, 261 days	
4 × 400 m relay	3:15.31	Joshua Shelton; Taylor-Nicole Overton; Jaelen Hunter; Olivia Harris	United States	5 August 2026	World U20 Championships	Eugene, United States	18 years, 37 days 17 years, 68 days 17 years, 70 days 17 years, 273 days	

== Indoor ==
=== Men ===
Event	Record	Athlete	Nationality	Date	Meet	Place	Age	Ref.	Video
50 m	5.67	Kareem Kelly	United States	19 February 2000	Los Angeles Invitational	Los Angeles, United States	18 years, 324 days		
55 m	6.07	Leonard Scott	United States	20 February 1999		Gainesville, United States	19 years, 32 days		
60 m	6.51	Mark Lewis-Francis	Great Britain	11 March 2001	World Championships	Lisbon, Portugal	18 years, 188 days		
60 m	6.51 #	Israel Okon Sunday	Nigeria	28 February 2025	SEC Championships	College Station, United States	18 years, 109 days		
200 m	20.37	Walter Dix	United States	12 March 2005		Fayetteville, United States	19 years, 40 days		
300 m	32.10	Sidi Njie	United States	10 January 2026	Clemson Invitational	Clemson, United States	18 years, 324 days		
400 m	44.80	Kirani James	Grenada	27 February 2011	SEC Championships	Fayetteville, United States	18 years, 179 days		
400 m	44.62 #	Jonathan Simms	United States	10 January 2026	Clemson Invitational	Clemson, United States	19 years, 2 days		
500 m	59.83	Abdalelah Haroun	Qatar	17 February 2016	Globen Galan	Stockholm, Sweden	17 years, 59 days		
600 y	1:06.93	Moitalel Naadokila	Kenya	15 February 2020		Lubbock, United States	19 years, 7 days		
600 m	1:14.15	Cooper Lutkenhaus	United States	1 February 2026	Millrose Games	New York City, United States	17 years, 44 days		
800 m	1:44.03	Cooper Lutkenhaus	United States	14 February 2026	ASICS Sound Invite	Winston-Salem, United States	17 years, 57 days		
1000 m	2:15.77	Abubaker Kaki	Sudan	21 February 2008		Stockholm, Sweden	18 years, 245 days		
1500 m	3:32.67+	Cameron Myers	Australia	8 February 2025	Millrose Games	New York City, United States	18 years, 244 days		
Mile	3:47.48	Cameron Myers	Australia	8 February 2025	Millrose Games	New York City, United States	18 years, 244 days		
2000 m	4:57.74	Yomif Kejelcha	Ethiopia	28 February 2014	Meeting National en salle de Metz	Metz, France	16 years, 211 days		
3000 m	7:29.99	Biniam Mehary	Ethiopia	13 February 2025	Meeting Hauts-de-France Pas-de-Calais	Liévin, France	18 years, 55 days		
Two miles	8:13.32	Tariku Bekele	Ethiopia	18 February 2006	Norwich Union Indoor Grand Prix	Birmingham, United Kingdom	18 years, 355 days		
5000 m	12:53.29	Isiah Koech	Kenya	11 February 2011	PSD Bank Meeting	Düsseldorf, Germany	17 years, 54 days		
50 m hurdles (106.7 cm)	6.52+	Liu Xiang	China	24 February 2002	Meeting Pas de Calais	Liévin, France	18 years, 224 days		
55 m hurdles (106.7 cm)	7.04	Kurt Powdar	United States	26 January 2019	Bullis Speed Invitational	New York City, United States	17 years, 329 days		
60 m hurdles (99/100 cm)	7.34	Sasha Zhoya	France	22 February 2020	French U20 Championships	Miramas, France	17 years, 242 days		
60 m hurdles (106.7 cm)	7.55	Liu Xiang	China	10 February 2002		Ghent, Belgium	18 years, 212 days		
60 m hurdles (106.7 cm)	7.55	Leonard Mustari	United States	11 February 2022	Tiger Paw Invitational	Clemson, United States	19 years, 29 days		
300 m hurdles	35.93 OT	Petteri Pulkkinen	Finland	19 February 1992	Finnish Championships	Tampere, Finland	18 years, 285 days		
400 m hurdles	50.41 OT	Wouter Le Roux	South Africa	9 February 2005	Botnia Games	Korsholm, Finland	19 years, 23 days		
High jump	2.35 m	Vladimir Yashchenko	Soviet Union	12 March 1978	European Championships	Milan, Italy	19 years, 59 days		
Pole vault	5.88 m	Armand Duplantis	Sweden	25 February 2018	All Star Perche	Clermont-Ferrand, France	18 years, 107 days		
Long jump	8.34 m	Mattia Furlani	Italy	17 February 2024	Italian Championships	Ancona, Italy	19 years, 10 days		
Triple jump	17.54 m A	Jaydon Hibbert	Jamaica	11 March 2023	NCAA Division I Championships	Albuquerque, United States	18 years, 53 days		
Shot put (6 kg)	22.48 m	Konrad Bukowiecki	Poland	8 January 2016		Toruń, Poland	18 years, 297 days		
Shot put (6 kg)	22.96 m	Konrad Bukowiecki	Poland	29 December 2016		Spała, Poland	19 years, 287 days		
Shot put (7.26 kg)	21.05 m	Terry Albritton	United States	22 February 1974		New York City, United States	19 years, 39 days		
Weight throw	22.31 m	Ággelos Mantzouránis	Greece	8 December 2023	M City Classic	Minneapolis, United States	19 years, 221 days		
Heptathlon (Junior)	6062 pts	Jente Hauttekeete	Belgium	13–14 February 2021	Mehrkampf - Siebenkampf U20	Frankfurt, Germany	18 years, 336 days		
Heptathlon (Junior)	60m / Long jump / Shot put / High jump / 60m H / Pole vault / 1000m; 7.07 / 7.33 m / 15.64 m / 2.10 m / 8.06 / 4.70 m / 2:46.71								
Heptathlon (Senior)	6022 pts	Gunnar Nixon	United States	27–28 January 2012	Razorback Invitational	Fayetteville, United States	19 years, 15 days		
Heptathlon (Senior)	60m / Long jump / Shot put / High jump / 60m H / Pole vault / 1000m; 7.10 / 7.53 m / 13.97 m / 2.15 m / 8.21 m / 4.50 m / 2:40.15								
5000 m walk (track)	18:47.2 h	Sergey Kozhevnikov	Russia	29 December 2019	Memorial Skurigin	Saransk, Russia	18 years, 234 days		
4 × 200 m relay	1:24.64	Bullis TC-MD; Connor Salmin; Quincy Wilson; Cameron Homer; Alexander Lambert	United States	21 March 2025	adidas Indoor Nationals	Virginia Beach, United States	17 years, 327 days 17 years, 72 days		
4 × 200 m relay	1:24.37#	Archbishop Carroll; Elijah Amenra; Niles Briggman; Keenen Davis; Jake Odey-Jordan	United States; United States; United States; Great Britain	14 March 2025	New Balance Nationals Indoor	Boston, United States	17 years, 82 days		
4 × 400 m relay	3:09.44	Bullis School; Cameron Homer; Alexander Lambert; Colin Abrams; Quincy Wilson	United States	16 March 2025	New Balance Nationals Indoor	Boston, United States	17 years, 67 days		
4 × 800 m relay	7:36.99	Albemarle High School; Zach Vrhovac; Luke Noble; Garrett Bradley; Anthony Kostelac	United States	15 March 2009	New Balance Nationals Indoor	Roxbury Crossing, United States	17 years, 243 days 18 years, 160 days 17 years, 208 days 17 years, 254 days		
4 × 800 m relay	7:35.05#	Union Catholic TC; Elijah McCoy (1:54.02); Keandre Kelly (1:52.40); Quintin Clemons (1:55.40); Ciaran Brosnan (1:53.23)	United States; Jamaica; United States; Ireland	12 March 2026	New Balance Nationals Indoor	Boston, United States	17 years, 273 days		

=== Women ===
Event	Record	Athlete	Nationality	Date	Meet	Place	Age	Ref.
50 m	6.24	Marlies Oelsner	East Germany	5 March 1977		Berlin, East Germany	18 years, 349 days	
50 m	6.24+	Adaejah Hodge	British Virgin Islands	12 January 2024	VA Showcase	Virginia Beach, United States	17 years, 305 days	
55 m	6.68 A	Aleisha Latimer	United States	19 January 1996		Boulder, United States	16 years, 281 days	
60 m	7.07	Ewa Swoboda	Poland	12 February 2016	Copernicus Cup	Toruń, Poland	18 years, 201 days	
60 m	7.07 A	Kaila Jackson	United States	10 March 2023	NCAA Division I Championships	Albuquerque, United States	18 years, 253 days	
200 m	22.34	JaMeesia Ford	United States	9 March 2024	NCAA Division I Championships	Boston, United States	19 years, 43 days	
200 m	22.33	Adaejah Hodge	British Virgin Islands	12 March 2023	New Balance Nationals	Boston, United States	16 years, 364 days	
300 m	35.83	JaMeesia Ford	United States	8 December 2023	Clemson Opener	Clemson, United States	18 years, 316 days	
400 m	50.82	Sanya Richards	United States	13 March 2004	NCAA Division I Championships	Fayetteville, United States	18 years, 292 days	
400 m	50.52 (Note: unratifiable because doping test not made on the day of competition)	Sydney McLaughlin	United States	25 February 2018	SEC Championships	College Station, United States	18 years, 202 days	
400 m	50.36 (Note: Unratified due no confirmation that doping control procedures were compliant)	Sydney McLaughlin	United States	10 March 2018	NCAA Division I Championships	College Station, United States	18 years, 215 days	
400 m	50.52	Athing Mu	United States	6 February 2021	Charlie Thomas Invitational	College Station, United States	18 years, 243 days	
500 m	1:08.94	Kseniya Zadorina	Russia	12 January 2006	Christmas Cup	Moscow, Russia	18 years, 316 days	
600 m	1:23.57	Athing Mu	United States	24 February 2019	USA Track & Field Indoor Championships	New York City, United States	16 years, 261 days	
800 m	1:58.40	Athing Mu	United States	27 February 2021	Southeastern Conference Championships	Fayetteville, United States	18 years, 264 days	
1000 m	2:35.80	Mary Cain	United States	8 February 2014	New Balance Indoor Grand Prix	Roxbury, United States	17 years, 281 days	
1500 m	4:01.23	Saron Berhe	Ethiopia	3 February 2026	Czech Indoor Gala	Ostrava, Czech Republic	18 years, 165 days	
Mile	4:24.10	Kalkidan Gezahegne	Ethiopia	20 February 2010	Aviva Indoor Grand Prix	Birmingham, United Kingdom	18 years, 288 days	
2000 m	5:35.46	Dawit Seyaum	Ethiopia	7 February 2015	New Balance Indoor Grand Prix	Boston, United States	18 years, 195 days	
3000 m	8:33.56	Tirunesh Dibaba	Ethiopia	20 February 2004	Aviva Indoor Grand Prix	Birmingham, United Kingdom	18 years, 142 days	
3000 m	8:32.49	Senayet Getachew	Ethiopia	4 February 2024	New Balance Grand Prix	Boston, United States	18 years, 126 days	
Two miles	9:07.12	Melknat Wudu	Ethiopia	11 February 2024	Millrose Games	New York City, United States	19 years, 39 days	
5000 m	14:53.99	Tirunesh Dibaba	Ethiopia	31 January 2004	Boston Indoor Games	Boston, United States	18 years, 122 days	
5000 m	14:44.79	Jane Hedengren	United States	6 December 2025	Boston University Sharon Colyear-Danville Season Opener	Boston, United States	19 years, 74 days	
5000 m	14:42.94	Senayet Getachew	Ethiopia	27 January 2024	BU John Thomas Terrier Classic	Boston, United States	18 years, 118 days	
50 m hurdles (84 cm)	6.95	Candy Young	United States	3 February 1979		Edmonton, Alberta, Canada	16 years, 258 days	
55 m hurdles	7.56	Nicole Hoxie	United States	7 February 1998		Norman, United States	18 years, 200 days	
60 m hurdles	7.92	Ackera Nugent	Jamaica	13 March 2021	NCAA Division I Championships	Fayetteville, United States	18 years, 318 days	
60 m hurdles	7.91	Grace Stark	United States	29 February 2020	SEC Championships	College Station, United States	18 years, 299 days	
60 m hurdles	7.91	Ackera Nugent	Jamaica	26 February 2021	Big 12 Championships	Lubbock, United States	18 years, 303 days	
300 m hurdles	41.19 OT	Annika Kumlin	Finland	18 February 1996		Kuopio, Finland	18 years, 332 days	
High jump	2.02 m	Yaroslava Mahuchikh	Ukraine	31 January 2020	Indoor Meeting Karlsruhe	Karlsruhe, Germany	18 years, 134 days	
Pole vault	4.71 m	Wilma Murto	Finland	31 January 2016		Zweibrücken, Germany	17 years, 234 days	
Long jump	6.91 m	Larissa Iapichino	Italy	20 February 2021	Italian Championships	Ancona, Italy	18 years, 217 days	
Triple jump	14.37 m	Ren Ruiping	China	11 March 1995		Barcelona, Spain	19 years, 38 days	
Shot put	20.51 m	Heidi Krieger	East Germany	8 February 1984		Budapest, Hungary	18 years, 203 days	
Pentathlon	4542 pts	Alina Shukh	Ukraine	4 February 2017	International Combined Events Meeting	Lasnamäe, Estonia	17 years, 358 days	
Pentathlon	60m H / High jump / Shot put / Long jump / 800m; 8.98 / 1.89 m / 13.81 m / 6.12 m / 2:16.84							
Pentathlon	4556 pts	Sophia Yakushina	Russia	27 February 2025	SEC Championships	College Station, United States	19 years, 51 days	
Pentathlon	60m H / High jump / Shot put / Long jump / 800m; 8.39 / 1.78 m / 12.11 m / 6.42 m / 2:13.59							
Pentathlon	4550 pts	Alina Shukh	Ukraine	27 January 2017	Ukrainian Team Championships	Zaporizhzhya, Ukraine	17 years, 350 days	
Pentathlon	60m H / High jump / Shot put / Long jump / 800m; 8.85 / 1.88 m / 14.27 m / 6.04 m / 2:17.69							
Pentathlon	4635 pts A	Kendell Williams	United States	15 March 2014	NCAA Division I Championships	Albuquerque, United States	18 years, 274 days	
Pentathlon	60m H / High jump / Shot put / Long jump / 800m; 8.21 / 1.88 m / 12.05 m / 6.32 m / 2:17.31							
Pentathlon	4694 pts OT	Sibylle Thiele	East Germany	26 January 1984		Senftenberg, East Germany	18 years, 326 days	
Pentathlon	60m H / High jump / Shot put / Long jump / 800m; 8.59 / 1.86 m / 14.32 m / 6.51 m / 2:20.4							
Pentathlon	4558 pts X	Nafissatou Thiam	Belgium	3 February 2013		Ghent, Belgium	18 years, 168 days	
Pentathlon	60m H / High jump / Shot put / Long jump / 800m; 8.65 / 1.84 m / 14.00 m / 6.30 m / 2:21.18							
1500 m walk	6:02.85+	Taylor Ewert	United States	9 February 2019	Millrose Games	New York City United States	17 years, 80 days	
Mile walk	6:28.21	Taylor Ewert	United States	9 February 2019	Millrose Games	New York City United States	17 years, 80 days	
3000 m walk (track)	12:05.6 h	Lyudmila Yefimkina	Russia	1 March 1998		Insar, Russia	16 years, 191 days	
3000 m walk (track)	12:05.1 h OT	Anastasiya Kolchina	Russia	24 September 2023	Final of the Race Walk Queen of Sports	Saransk, Russia	18 years, 136 days	
5000 m walk (track)	21:30.1	Vera Sokolova	Russia	6 January 2005		Chelyabinsk, Russia	17 years, 212 days	
4 × 200 m relay	1:35.86	Long Beach Poly; Shana Solomon; Jasmine Lee; Dominique Dorsey; Shalonda Solomon	United States	16 March 2003		New York City, United States	16 years, 345 days 17 years, 84 days 17 years, 87 days	
4 × 400 m relay	3:38.91	Long Beach Poly; Deshante Harris; Jasmine Lee; Shana Woods; Shalonda Solomon	United States	14 March 2004		New York City, United States	17 years, 190 days 17 years, 344 days 17 years, 251 days 18 years, 86 days	
4 × 800 m relay	8:59.37	Suffern High School; McKenna; Greany; Heidt; Consiglio	United States	12 March 2006		New York City, United States		
4 × 800 m relay	8:53.67 (Note: not recognised by World Athletics)	Boys and Girls High School, Brooklyn; Vargas; Fernandez; Francis; Livingston (Jamaica)	United States	1 March 2002		New York City, United States		
