= 2026 World Athletics U20 Championships – Men's 400 metres =

Men's 400 metres at the 2026 World Athletics U20 Championships
- Venue: Hayward Field
- Dates: 6 August (Round 1 & Semi-finals); 7 August (Final)
- Competitors: 59
- Winning time: 44.47

Medalists
gold medal	Jayden DeLeon	United States
silver medal	Quincy Wilson	United States
bronze medal	Leendert Koekemoer	South Africa

The men's 400 metres at the 2026 World Athletics U20 Championships was held at Hayward Field in Eugene, United States on 6 and 7 August 2026.

== Records ==
U20 standing records prior to the 2026 World Athletics U20 Championships were as follows:

Record	Athlete & Nationality	Mark	Location	Date
World U20 Record	Steve Lewis (USA)	43.87	Seoul, South Korea	28 September 1988
Championship Record	Anthony Pesela (BOT)	44.58	Nairobi, Kenya	21 August 2021
World U20 Leading	Jonathan Simms (USA)	43.92	Eugene, United States	12 June 2026

== Results ==
=== Round 1 ===
Round 1 took place in the morning session on 6 August 2026.

==== Heat 1 ====
Place	Lane	Athlete	Nation	Time	Notes
1	7	Godfred Opoku	Ghana	46.05	Q
2	5	Shamari Greenidge-Lewis	Barbados	46.34	Q, PB
3	8	Zachery Frank	Trinidad and Tobago	46.61	Q
4	2	Jason Pitter	Jamaica	46.83	q
5	9	Imadeddine Hamida	Algeria	47.03	q
6	3	Afonso Conceiçao	Portugal	47.92	
—	4	Gerardo Hernández	Mexico	DQ	TR16.8
—	6	Tsaone Dintwa	Botswana	DQ	TR17.3.3

==== Heat 2 ====
Place	Lane	Athlete	Nation	Time	Notes
1	9	Jabari Matheson	Jamaica	46.40	Q
2	2	Lucas Couderc	France	46.64	Q
3	4	Suleiman Abdulrahman	United Arab Emirates	46.68	Q
4	7	Aimrane Bintaoui	Morocco	47.45 [.441]	
5	8	Jessus Armando Bănicioiu	Romania	47.45 [.443]	
6	3	Rayvon Black	Turks and Caicos Islands	47.90	
7	1	Sergio Rojas	Colombia	47.92	
8	6	Francesco Miorini	Italy	48.15	
9	5	Gao Yi	China	48.39	

==== Heat 3 ====
Place	Lane	Athlete	Nation	Time	Notes
1	3	Dominik Jezernik	Croatia	46.28	Q, PB
2	2	Zion Davis	Bahamas	46.73	Q
3	8	Sadew Vimansa Rajakaruna	Sri Lanka	47.36	Q
4	9	Oliwier Frąckowiak	Poland	47.47	
5	7	Juan Sebastián Sánchez	Colombia	47.73	
6	5	Christoffer Banke Jørgensen	Denmark	47.80	
7	4	Esteban Avena	Mexico	47.82	
8	6	Péter Csaba Sáray	Hungary	48.04	

==== Heat 4 ====
Place	Lane	Athlete	Nation	Time	Notes
1	1	Malachi Austin	Guyana	46.48	Q
2	4	Kryn Romijn	South Africa	46.93	Q
3	7	Junior Phatsima	Botswana	47.05	Q
4	5	Riccardo Fumagalli	Italy	47.59	
5	2	Rui Huang	China	48.48	
6	3	Edward Alberto Medrano	El Salvador	50.37	
7	9	Tom Gillard	Switzerland	DNF	
8	8	Vasil Antonov	Bulgaria	DNF	
9	6	David Dominion Udoh	Nigeria	DQ	TR17.3.3

==== Heat 5 ====
Place	Lane	Athlete	Nation	Time	Notes
1	8	Jayden DeLeon	United States	45.63	Q
2	5	Mohammed Ashfaq	India	45.81	Q, NU20R
3	7	Chase Grant	Australia	46.27	Q
4	2	Tishawn Easton	Guyana	46.34	q, PB
5	3	Emīls Lamba	Latvia	47.37	q
6	9	Adam Nyarko	Canada	47.41	
7	4	Kjartan Óli Bjarnason	Iceland	47.94	
8	1	Ismail Bouziza	Algeria	48.67	

==== Heat 6 ====
Place	Lane	Athlete	Nation	Time	Notes
1	5	Leendert Koekemoer	South Africa	45.75	Q
2	4	Omel Shashintha Silva	Sri Lanka	46.36	Q
3	8	Ropafadzo Liberty Mzondo	Zimbabwe	46.51	Q, PB
4	7	Yariel Perez	Puerto Rico	46.96	q
5	3	Piyush Raj	India	47.78	
6	6	Frane Delonga	Croatia	47.95	
7	9	Filip Stanković	Serbia	48.12	
8	2	Kiile Alexander	Trinidad and Tobago	48.99	

==== Heat 7 ====
Place	Lane	Athlete	Nation	Time	Notes
1	5	Quincy Wilson	United States	45.74	Q
2	4	Milann Klemenic	France	45.83	Q, NU20R
3	9	Seth Kennedy	Australia	46.56	Q, PB
4	2	Zachary Jeggo	Canada	47.33	q
5	3	Javano Bridgewater	Bahamas	47.54	
6	6	Tjark Schult	Germany	47.83	
7	7	Hunter Scott	New Zealand	47.86	
8	8	Diosquendri Lenin Rojas	Dominican Republic	48.49	
9	1	Tomáš Žigo	Slovakia	48.89	

=== Semi-finals ===
The semi-finals took place in the afternoon session on 6 August 2026.

==== Heat 1 ====
Place	Lane	Athlete	Nation	Time	Notes
1	6	Jayden DeLeon	United States	45.49	Q
2	7	Malachi Austin	Guyana	45.87	Q
3	8	Zion Davis	Bahamas	45.96	Q
4	3	Suleiman Abdulrahman	United Arab Emirates	46.27	
5	4	Lucas Couderc	France	46.69	
6	5	Jabari Matheson	Jamaica	47.10	
7	2	Yariel Perez	Puerto Rico	47.29	
8	1	Imadeddine Hamida	Algeria	47.62	
9	9	Zachery Frank	Trinidad and Tobago	47.91	

==== Heat 2 ====
Place	Lane	Athlete	Nation	Time	Notes
1	7	Leendert Koekemoer	South Africa	45.18	Q
2	6	Milann Klemenic	France	45.87	Q
3	5	Godfred Opoku	Ghana	45.91	Q
4	8	Chase Grant	Australia	46.36	
5	1	Tishawn Easton	Guyana	46.57	
6	9	Ropafadzo Liberty Mzondo	Zimbabwe	47.11	
7	2	Emīls Lamba	Latvia	47.20	
8	4	Jessus Armando Banicioiu	Romania	47.46	
9	3	Sadew Vimansa Rajakaruna	Sri Lanka	47.59	

==== Heat 3 ====
Place	Lane	Athlete	Nation	Time	Notes
1	5	Quincy Wilson	United States	45.02	Q
2	8	Kryn Romijn	South Africa	45.87	Q
3	6	Mohammed Ashfaq	India	46.00	Q
4	4	Omel Shashintha Silva	Sri Lanka	46.06	
5	3	Junior Phatsima	Botswana	46.32	
6	2	Jason Pitter	Jamaica	46.50	
7	9	Seth Kennedy	Australia	46.51	PB
8	7	Dominik Jezernik	Croatia	47.27	
9	1	Zachary Jeggo	Canada	49.15	

=== Final ===
The final took place in the afternoon session on 7 August 2026.

Place	Lane	Athlete	Nation	Time	Notes
1st place, gold medalist(s)	7	Jayden DeLeon	United States	44.47	CR
2nd place, silver medalist(s)	5	Quincy Wilson	United States	44.62	SB
3rd place, bronze medalist(s)	6	Leendert Koekemoer	South Africa	44.96	
4	3	Godfred Opoku	Ghana	45.46	
5	1	Zion Davis	Bahamas	46.00	
6	4	Malachi Austin	Guyana	46.03	
7	8	Kryn Romijn	South Africa	46.16	
8	2	Mohammed Ashfaq	India	46.20	
9	9	Milann Klemenic	France	46.31	
