= 2026 World Athletics U20 Championships – Men's 4 × 400 metres relay =

Men's 4 × 400 metres relay at the 2026 World Athletics U20 Championships
- Venue: Hayward Field
- Dates: 8 August (Round 1); 9 August (Final)
- Competitors: 103 from 24 nations
- Winning time: 3:01.39 WU20L

Medalists
gold medal	Quincy Wilson; Cameron Tucker; Alexander Osayemi; Jayden DeLeon; Ade Lloyd*; Carlo Johnson*	United States
silver medal	Ryno Riekert; Kryn Romijn; Abelines Schoeman; Leendert Koekemoer	South Africa
bronze medal	Milann Klemencic; Rayan Bouhouche; Lucas Couderc; Dylan Telo; Kristen Colly*; Hugo Charlet*	France

The men's 4 × 400 metres relay at the 2026 World Athletics U20 Championships was held at Hayward Field in Eugene, United States on 8 and 9 August 2026.

== Records ==
U20 standing records prior to the 2026 World Athletics U20 Championships were as follows:

Record	Nation	Mark	Location	Date
World U20 Record	United States	3:00.33	Trujillo, Peru	23 July 2017
Championship Record	United States	3:01.09	Grosseto, Italy	18 July 2024
World U20 Leading	Dominican Republic	3:04.58	Bayaguana, Dominican Republic	28 March 2026

== Results ==
=== Round 1 ===
Round 1 took place in the morning session on 8 August 2026. First 3 of each heat (Q) qualify to the final.

==== Heat 1 ====
Place	Lane	Nation	Athletes	Time	Notes
1	7	Botswana	Warona Mbigi Mokgosi, Junior Phatsima, Mabua Resego, Tsaone Dintwa	3:08.22	Q, SB
2	4	France	Lucas Couderc, Rayan Bouhouche, Kristen Colly, Hugo Charlet	3:08.28	Q
3	3	Germany	Amir Bilal Chaib Cuti, Tjark Schult, Milan Stadler, Michal Fatyga	3:08.88	Q, SB
4	6	Sri Lanka	Mohamed Atheeb Riffai, Rajakaruna Mudiyanselage, Iresh Maduwantha Bogodalage, Thisen Ranvidu Omaththa	3:09.68	
5	9	Guyana	Tishawn Easton, Dejaun Grant, Skylar Charles, Malachi Austin	3:10.93	NU20R
6	5	Mexico	Braulio Fernández, Gerardo Hernández, Carlos Daniel Fierro, Esteban Avena	3:11.15	
7	2	Chile	Tomas Peñaloza, Manuel Guzmán, Marc Anderson Donat, Cristobal Keim	3:14.53	

==== Heat 2 ====
Place	Lane	Nation	Athletes	Time	Notes
1	5	Australia	Seth Kennedy, Fred Hamblin, Dylan Ruming, Chase Grant	3:07.04	Q, SB
2	1	Poland	Oliwier Dondziło, Bartłomiej Adamczyk, Michał Kiernożycki, Oliwier Frąckowiak	3:07.12	Q, SB
3	7	Zimbabwe	Nenyasha Chihora, Emmanuel Uriga, Gift Khumalo, Ropafadzo Liberty Mzondo	3:08.56	Q, NU20R
4	3	Bahamas	Zion Shepherd, Javano Bridgewater, Jonathan Higgs, Sonycko Ilet	3:09.09	SB
5	2	Spain	Alejandro Núñez, Aaron Gaston, Oscar Crespo, Pablo Rojo	3:09.17	SB
6	9	Belgium	Louis Smeets, Matteo Vercruysse, Jakob Verleyen, Paul Noirhomme	3:09.25	SB
7	4	Barbados	Nadal Seale, Aidan Moore, Zachary Wall, Jahkye Brewster	3:13.48	
8	8	Saudi Arabia	Meshal Abdullah Hazazi, Ali Abdulfattah Alrumayh, Mohammed Hezam Alshahrani, Faisal Hassan Alasmari	3:15.43	

==== Heat 3 ====
Place	Lane	Nation	Athletes	Time	Notes
1	7	United States	Ade Lloyd, Cameron Tucker, Carlo Johnson, Alexander Osayemi	3:04.55	Q, WU20L
2	5	South Africa	Ryno Riekert, Kryn Romijn, Abelines Schoeman, Leendert Koekemoer	3:05.08	Q, SB
3	6	Jamaica	Nishawn Walker, Jordan Rehedul, Jaeden Campbell, Jabulani McLeod	3:06.44	Q, SB
4	8	Trinidad and Tobago	Zachery Frank, Jaden Clement, Joshua Perry, Kiile Alexander	3:07.43	SB
5	3	India	Sayed Sabeer, Ranjith Kumar, Piyush Raj, Mohammed Ashfaq	3:08.56	
6	2	Croatia	Frane Delonga, Mihael BartolinčIć, Lovro Šourek, Dominik Jezernik	3:10.52	SB
7	1	Canada	Adam Nyarko, William Tapodi, Ryan Georgeson, Zachary Jeggo	3:13.28	
8	9	Italy	Filippo Galleni, Francesco Miorini, Tommaso Ardizzone, Nicolo' Borello	3:13.59	SB
9	4	Puerto Rico	Yariel Perez, Jatzyel Hernández, Pablo Valentín, Enrique Ramos	3:14.75	SB

=== Final ===
The final took place in the afternoon session on 9 August 2026.

Place	Lane	Nation	Athletes	Time	Notes
1st place, gold medalist(s)	5	United States	Quincy Wilson, Cameron Tucker, Alexander Osayemi, Jayden DeLeon	3:01.39	WU20L
2nd place, silver medalist(s)	4	South Africa	Ryno Riekert, Kryn Romijn, Abelines Schoeman, Leendert Koekemoer	3:02.76	AU20R
3rd place, bronze medalist(s)	9	France	Milann Klemenic, Rayan Bouhouche, Lucas Couderc, Dylan Telo	3:04.80	NU20R
4	7	Australia	Seth Kennedy, Fred Hamblin, Dylan Hall, Chase Grant	3:04.84	SB
5	3	Jamaica	Nishawn Walker, Jabari Matheson, Jason Pitter, Jabulani McLeod	3:05.71	SB
6	6	Botswana	Warona Mbigi Mokgosi, Junior Phatsima, Mabua Resego, Tsaone Dintwa	3:05.80	SB
7	8	Poland	Oliwier Dondziło, Bartłomiej Adamczyk, Michał Kiernożycki, Oliwier Frąckowiak	3:08.14	
8	1	Zimbabwe	Nenyasha Chihora, Emmanuel Uriga, Gift Khumalo, Ropafadzo Liberty Mzondo	3:12.14	
9	2	Germany	Amir Bilal Chaib Cuti, Tjark Schult, Milan Stadler, Michal Fatyga	3:12.63	
