= Cameron Tucker =

Cameron Tucker may refer to:

- Cameron Tucker (runner) (born 2007), American runner
- Cameron Tucker (soccer) (born 1999), American soccer player
- Cameron Tucker (Modern Family), a fictional character on American TV comedy series Modern Family
