= Leendert Koekemoer =

South African sprinter (born 2007)

Personal information
- Born: 15 May 2007 (age 19)

Sport
- Sport: Athletics
- Event: Sprint

Achievements and titles
- Personal best: 400m: 44.52 (2026)
Medal record
Men's athletics
Representing South Africa
World Championships
Bronze medal – third place	2025 Tokyo	4 × 400 m relay
World Relays
Gold medal – first place	2025 Guangzhou	4×400 m relay
Silver medal – second place	2026 Gaborone	4×400 m relay
World U20 Championships
Silver medal – second place	2026 Eugene	4 x 400 m relay
Bronze medal – third place	2026 Eugene	400m

Leendert Koekemoer (born 15 May 2007) is a South African sprinter.

== Biography ==
He ran 46.38 seconds to win the 400 metres at the South African Athletics U18 Championships title in 2023, at the age of 15 years-old. However, Koekemoer struggled with injuries the following year which derailed most of his 2024 season. In January 2025, he ran under 45.96 seconds for the 400 metres in his first race in the U20 category. In doing so, he became the tenth South African junior athlete to run under 46 seconds in the 400m sprint, climbing to eighth place in the all-time national rankings.

He ran a new personal best of 45.03 seconds in the semi-finale of the South African Athletics Championships in April 2025, breaking the longstanding South African junior record of 45.15 seconds, set by Riaan Dempers, 31 years previously. In the final he finished in fifth place overall with a time of 45.31 seconds.

He was selected for the South African relay pool at the 2025 World Athletics Relays in China, where he was a gold medalist in the Men's 4 × 400 metres relay, running a split of 44.23 seconds in the final as the South African team set a new national record of 2:57.50. He also competed in the Mixed 4 × 400 metres relay at the event.

He ran in the mixed 4x400 metres relay at the 2025 World Athletics Championships in Tokyo. He was later a bronze medalist in the men's 4 x 400 metres relay after running in the opening round although not the final.

Competing at the 2026 World Athletics Relays in Botswana, he was part of the South Africa men's 4 x 400 metres relay team which won their heat on the opening day. The following day, he ran as the team won the silver medal and set a new South African national record 2:55.07 to move to fifth on the all-time list. In the final of the 400 metres at the 2026 World Athletics U20 Championships in August, he won the bronze medal behind Jayden DeLeon and Quincy Wilson of the United States, running 44.96 seconds. On the final day of the championship he also won the silver medal in the men's 4 x 400 metres relay.

== Personal life ==
He attended Helpmekaar Kollege in Johannesburg. He now attends the University of Johannesburg.
