= Jayden DeLeon =

American sprinter (born 2007)

Personal information
- Born: December 26, 2007 (age 18) Elkridge, Maryland

Sport
- Country: United States
- Sport: Athletics
- Event: Sprint
- Club: HAWI Management

Achievements and titles
- Personal bests: Outdoor; 200 m: 20.68 (Eugene 2026); 400 m: 44.47 (Eugene 2026); Indoor; 200 m: 20.77i (Virginia Beach 2026); 300 m: 32.75i (New York City 2026); 400 m: 45.38i (Boston 2026)
Medal record
Men's athletics
Representing the United States
World U20 Championships
Gold medal – first place	2026 Eugene	400m
Gold medal – first place	2026 Eugene	4 × 400 m relay

Jayden DeLeon (born December 26, 2007) is an American track and field sprinter who specializes in the 400 meters.

== Early life ==
He attended Oakland Mills High School in Columbia, Maryland, where he competed in track and field. He committed to attend LSU. He trains with The House Running Club based in Washington, D.C.

== Career ==
In 2025, DeLeon attended New Balance Nationals Outdoor to run the 200 meters and the 400 meters. He ran a then PR of 21.03 seconds and 46.33 seconds respectively in the events.

In January 2026, as a senior in high school, he ran the 300 meters in New York for the Puma New York International Showcase, winning the event by running 32.75 seconds. He also ran 6.93 seconds in the 60 meters, placing third. In March, he competed in the New Balance Indoor Nationals in the 400 meters, placing second behind Quincy Wilson with a time of 45.38 seconds. The result was a photo finish, with DeLeon finishing 0.009 seconds behind Wilson. In the same meet, he ran 20.77 seconds in the 200 meters.

On June 19, DeLeon competed in the 400 meters at the USATF U20 Outdoor Championships held in Eugene, Oregon and competed in the 200 meters at the Nike Outdoor Nationals, which were adjacent to each other. This time, he beat Wilson with a PB of 44.52 seconds, qualifying for the World Athletics U20 Championships on the U.S. team. This made DeLeon the second fastest 400m high schooler in the US ever after Wilson. Two days later, DeLeon won the 200m at Nike Outdoor Nationals with a time of 20.68.

On the evening of August 7, DeLeon won the 400 meters at the 2026 World Athletics U20 Championships with a Championship Record and personal best of 44.47 seconds to win ahead of Wilson and Leendert Koekemoer. Two days later, he ran the anchor leg for the 4 × 400 metres relay to win gold for the USA with a World U20 Lead of 3:01.39, the third fastest time in the age group's history.

In October 2026, DeLeon forwent his commitment from LSU to turn professional, signing with HAWI Management.
