= Alexander Osayemi =

American sprinter (born 2007)

Personal information
- Nationality: American
- Born: July 16, 2007 (age 19)

Sport
- Sport: Athletics
- Event: Sprints
Medal record
Men's athletics
Representing the United States
World U20 Championships
Gold medal – first place	2026 Eugene	4×400 m

Alexander Osayemi (born July 16, 2007) is an American sprinter.

== Career ==
A student at Clayton High School, Osayemi competed at the 2025 NJSIAA Meet of Champions and set a personal best and meet record in the 400 metres with a time of 46.08 seconds, and won the state title. This was the second-fastest 400 metre time in New Jersey high school history, trailing only Clayton Parros 45.71 seconds set in 2009.

In August 2026, Osayemi competed at the 2026 World Athletics U20 Championships and was part of the American quartet that won a gold medal in the 4 × 400 metres relay with a time of 3:01.39.
