= Cameron Tucker (runner) =

American sprinter (born 2007)

Personal information
- Nationality: American
- Born: December 29, 2007 (age 18)

Sport
- Sport: Athletics
- Event: Sprints
Medal record
Men's athletics
Representing the United States
World U20 Championships
Gold medal – first place	2026 Eugene	4×400 m

Cameron Tucker (born December 29, 2007) is an American sprinter.

== Early life and education ==
Tucker attended Jay M. Robinson High School where he led the program to its first state championship on May 15, 2026 and was named the 2026 North Carolina Gatorade Player of the Year. He broke the North Carolina High School Athletic Association (NCHSAA) indoor championship record in the 300 metres with a time of 32.75 seconds.

== Career ==
In August 2026, Tucker competed at the 2026 World Athletics U20 Championships and was part of the American quartet that won a gold medal in the 4 × 400 metres relay with a time of 3:01.39.
