= Tsegaye Mekonnen =

Ethiopian long-distance runner

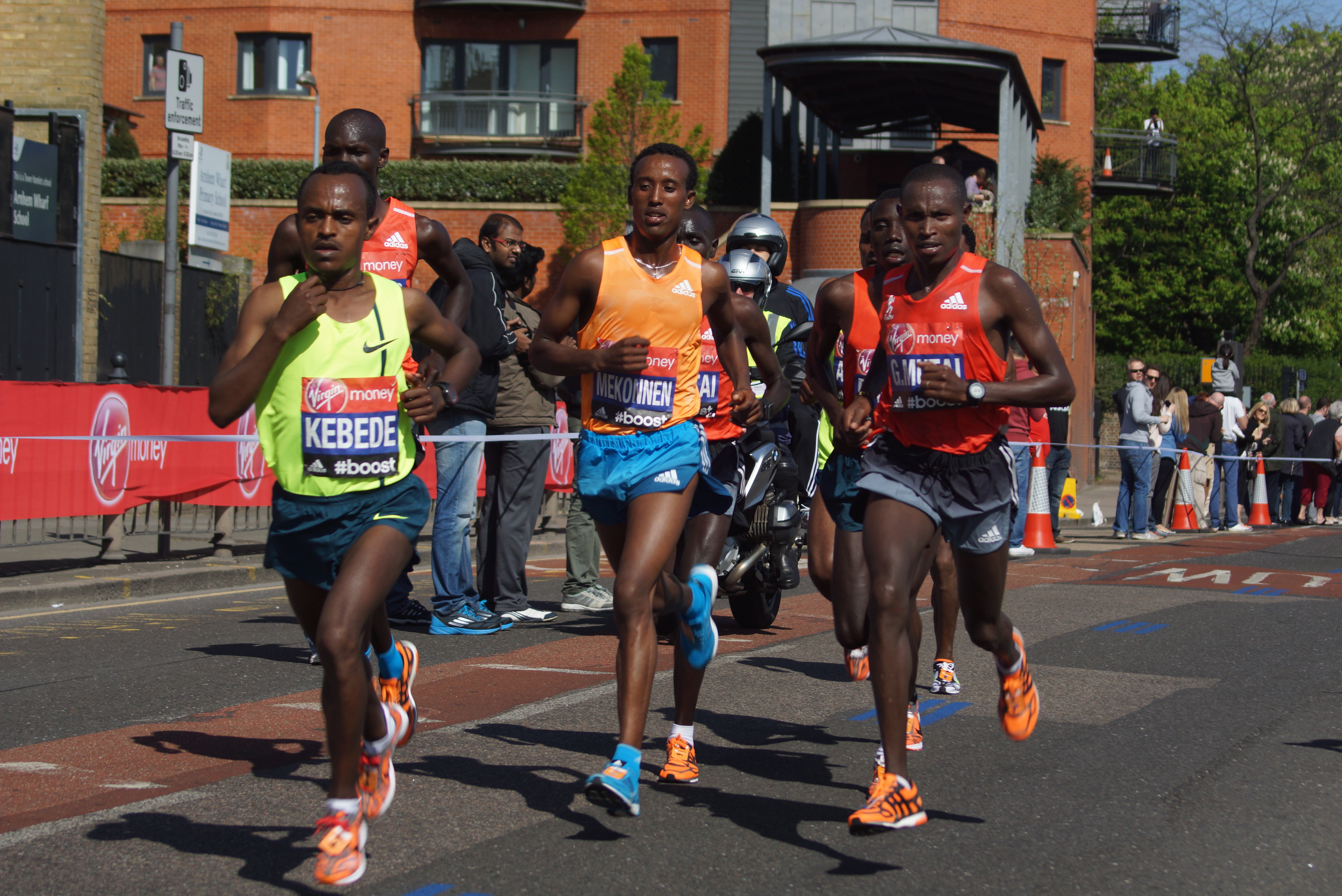
- Mekonnen in 2014 (middle)

Personal information
- Nationality: Ethiopian
- Born: 15 June 1995 (age 30)

Sport
- Sport: Track and field
- Event: Marathon

Tsegaye Mekonnen (born 15 June 1995) is an Ethiopian long-distance runner. He won the 2014 Dubai Marathon on his debut. In 2017, he competed in the men's marathon event at the 2017 World Championships in Athletics held in London, England.
