= Anthony Kostelac =

Personal information
- Nationality: American
- Born: July 4, 1991 (age 35) Charlottesville, Virginia, U.S.

Sport
- Sport: Track
- Event: 800 meters
- College team: Virginia

Achievements and titles
- Personal best: 800 meters: 1:47.28
- Updated on 11-12-2014

Anthony Kostelac (born July 4, 1991) is an American middle-distance runner who specializes in the 800 meters. As a high schooler, he was a part of Albemarle High School's men's 4×800 meter relay team which broke a world junior record in 2012. He went on to compete as an 800-meter runner with University of Virginia, in addition to building a reputation as a prolific relay runner.

== Running career ==
=== High school ===
Kostelac attended and ran for Albemarle High School. His coaches at Albemarle were "Buz" Male and Lance Weisend. In 2010 Kostelac was named Burger King Male Student Athlete of the Year. In the years Kostelac attended Albemarle, the high school fielded a historic 4 × 800 men's relay team including Kostelac, Zach Vrhovac, Luke Noble, and Garrett Bradley. The four-man squad would set an indoor world junior record in 2009 at the Boston Indoor Championships. They were also successful on a national level in the outdoor season, as the Albemarle 4x800 relay team would win a tightly-contested 2009 Penn Relays high school 4x800 relay race. Kostelac, Albemarle's anchor runner, got the baton behind Morris Hills High School's Liam Tansey, whose team was on the verge of winning the race before Kostelac (a junior during this season) took the lead in the last 175 meters and held it to win the race. By the time he graduated from Albemarle, he was a high school record-holder in the 800 meters for the state of Virginia. Kostelac graduated in 2010 with a 3.9 GPA.

=== Collegiate ===
Kostelac was recruited by close-by University of Virginia, whose men's 4x800 relay team would become one of the most competitive in NCAA history with Kostelac, Robby Andrews, Lance Roller, and Brett Johnson. The quartet won the 2011 Penn Relays men's 4x800 relay race with a time of 7:12.15; it is the second fastest 4x800 relay time in Penn Relays' 127-year history, as well as the seventh fastest 4x800 relay result recorded in the United States.
