= JaMeesia Ford =

American sprinter (born 2005)

Personal information
- Born: 26 January 2005 (age 21) Hampton, Virginia, U.S.
- Home town: Fayetteville, North Carolina, U.S.

Sport
- Sport: Athletics
- Event: Sprint

Achievements and titles
- Personal bests: 100m: 10.87 (Eugene, 2025); 200m: 21.98 (Eugene, 2025); 400m: 50.33 (Eugene, 2024); Indoors; 200m: 22.34 (Boston, 2024) NU20R; 300m: 35.83 (Clemson, 2023) WU20R
Medal record
Women's athletics
Representing United States
Pan American U20 Championships
Gold medal – first place	2023 Mayagüez	4x400 m mixed relay

JaMeesia Ford (born 26 January 2005) is an American track and field athlete who competes as a sprinter. In 2024, she became the NCAA 200 metres indoor champion and in 2025 NCAA outdoor 200 metres champion. She is also the American national under-20 indoor record holder over 200 metres and is world under-20 record holder over 300 metres.

== Early life ==
Originally from Hampton, Virginia, Ford started running at nine years-old. She is a member of Fayetteville Flyers in Fayetteville, North Carolina. Ford attended Jack Britt High School. She won gold in the 200m and 400m races at the N.C. High School Athletic Association 4-A Mideast Regional Championships. She also won gold in the 200 metres at the AAU Junior Olympic Games in Greensboro, North Carolina in 2019 aged 14 years-old.

== Career ==
Ford was a gold medalist in the mixed 4 × 400 m relay at the 2023 Pan American U20 Athletics Championships in Mayagüez, Puerto Rico in August 2023.

In Indianapolis in December 2023, Ford ran the fastest American indoor 300 metres ever by a U20 woman, running 35.83, eclipsing the 36.12 run by Sydney McLaughlin in 2017. It was the fourth-fastest indoor time ever by an American woman and placed her equal seventh on the women's world all-time indoor performer list.

In February 2024 at the Tiger Paw International in Clemson, South Carolina, Ford ran the second fastest U20 200m indoor race of all time, and fourth fastest all-time collegiate indoor time of 22.36 seconds. It also set the fastest American U20 indoor record, surpassing the 22.40 set by Bianca Knight in 2008. At the same meet, she ran a 51.33 personal best for the 400 metres.

Competing for the University of South Carolina at the NCAA Indoor Championships in Boston, Massachusetts, she won the 200 metres final in a time of 22.34 seconds.

She lowered her personal best to 22.11 seconds for the 200 metres at the SEC Outdoor Championships in Gainesville, Florida on 11 May 2024. She ran 22.08 to finish second in the 200m at the 2024 NCAA Championships final in Eugene, Oregon.

Ford swept the sprint races at the 2025 SEC Championships, running 11.055 seconds to beat Tima Godbless by a thousandth of a second in the 100 metres and breaking the championship record in the 200 metres set by McKenzie Long the previous year with 22.01 seconds. She ran a personal best 10.87 seconds in the semi-finals of the 100 metres at the 2025 NCAA Outdoor Championships in Eugene, Oregon in June 2025. On the same day she ran a personal best 21.98 seconds in the 200 metres and also anchored South Carolina's 4x100m and 4x400m relay teams as they qualified for the final of both events. In the final of the 100 metres she finished as runner-up by three-thousandths of a second, in a time of 11.14 seconds. She won the 200 metres title with a time of 22.21 seconds.

She reached the semi-finals of the 100 metres at the 2025 USA Outdoor Track and Field Championships, running her heat in 11.05 seconds (+3.2 m/s).

In February 2026, Ford placed second to Adaejah Hodge in the 200 meters final at the 2026 SEC Indoor Championships and fourth in the final of the 2026 NCAA Indoor Championships in 22.74 seconds. In June, she qualified for the 2026 NCAA Outdoor Championships.
