= Taylor-Nicole Overton =

American sprinter (born 2009)

Personal information
- Born: May 26, 2009 (age 17)

Sport
- Sport: Athletics
- Event: Sprint
Medal record
Women's athletics
Representing the United States
World U20 Championships
| Gold medal – first place | 2026 Eugene | 4×400 m relay |
| Gold medal – first place | 2026 Eugene | 4×400 m mixed |

Taylor-Nicole Overton (born 26 May 2009) is an American sprinter. She was a two-time gold medalist at the 2026 World Athletics U20 Championships.

== Biography ==
Overton attended Vero Beach High School and won back-to-back Florida state high championships over 400 metres. On June 19, 2026, she placed third over 400 metres at the USA U20 Championships.

On August 5, 2026, she was part of the United States quartet that set a world under-20 record of 3:15.31 in the mixed 4 x 400 metres in winning the gold medal at the 2026 World Athletics U20 Championships in Eugene. The time was more than two seconds faster than the previous best set by the United States team at the event in 2022. Later at the championships, she also won the gold medal in the final of the women's 4 x 400 metres relay.
