= Joshua Shelton =

American sprinter (born 2008)

Personal information
- Born: 29 June 2008 (age 18)

Sport
- Sport: Athletics
- Event: Sprint
Medal record
Men's athletics
Representing United States
World U20 Championships
Gold medal – first place	2026 Eugene	4x400 m mixed

Joshua Shelton (born 29 June 2008) is an American sprinter. He was a gold medalist at the 2026 World Athletics U20 Championships in the mixed 4 × 400 metres relay.

== Biography ==
Shelton attended Pearland High School in Texas and won the UIL 6A state track championships over 400 metres, with a time of 45.86 seconds, later committing to Texas A&M University and lowering his best to 45.21 seconds.

On 5 August 2026, he was part of the United States quartet that set a world under-20 record of 3:15.31 in the mixed 4 x 400 metres in winning the gold medal at the 2026 World Athletics U20 Championships in Eugene. The time was more than two seconds faster than the previous best set by the United States team at the event in 2022.
