= Jaelen Hunter =

American sprinter (born 2009)

Personal information
- Born: 27 May 2009 (age 17)

Sport
- Sport: Athletics
- Event: Sprint
Medal record
Men's athletics
Representing United States
World U20 Championships
| Gold medal – first place | 2026 Eugene | 4x400 m mixed |

Jaelen Hunter (born 27 May 2009) is an American sprinter. He was a gold medalist at the 2026 World Athletics U20 Championships in the mixed 4 × 400 metres relay.

== Biography ==
Hunter attended Servite High School in Anaheim, California. As a high school sophomore he ran a meeting record 46.66 seconds for the 400 metres at the Trabuco Hills Invitational in April 2026.

On 5 August 2026, he was part of the United States quartet that set a world under-20 record of 3:15.31 in the mixed 4 x 400 metres in winning the gold medal at the 2026 World Athletics U20 Championships in Eugene. The time was more than two seconds faster than the previous best set by the United States team at the event in 2022.
