= Jonathan Simms (sprinter) =

American sprinter

Personal information
- Born: January 8, 2007 (age 19)

Sport
- Sport: Athletics
- Event: Sprint

Achievements and titles
- Personal bests: 400m: 43.92 (2026); Indoors; 400m: 44.62 (2026) AU20R

Jonathan Simms (born January 8, 2007) is an American sprinter. In 2026, he ran the fourth fastest indoor all-time 400 metres, and later placed second in the 400 metres at the 2026 NCAA Outdoor Championships whilst a freshman at the University of Georgia.

== Biography ==
From Allen, Texas, Simms attended Allen High School. He ran the 400 metres in 46.09 seconds to win at the Nike Outdoor Nationals in June 2023. In August 2023, following the conclusion of his sophomore year of high school, Simms ran an under-16 world best of 45.12 seconds for the 400 metres at the AAU Junior Olympic Games. The previous best by Obea Moore had stood since 1995.

In February 2024, he placed third behind Quincy Wilson running 1:18.22 for the U20 600 metres at the 2024 Millrose Games. However, his 2024 season was ended prematurely with injury. In June 2025, he lowered his 400 metres personal best to 45.44 seconds in winning the USATF U20 Championships in Eugene, Oregon.

In January 2026, Simms moved to joint fourth on the all-time list over 400m indoors, tied with Randolph Ross, when he ran 44.62s in his NCAA debut for the University of Georgia at the Clemson Invitational, the time was 0.13 seconds outside the fastest ever recorded, by Christopher Morales Williams. The time was also an unratified under-20 world record. Simms placed fourth in the 400 m at the 2026 NCAA Indoor Championships, running 45.11 seconds. In May, Simms ran a personal best 44.02 for the 400 m at the Torrin Lawrence Memorial in Athens, Georgia and 44.16 to place third at the SEC Championships. Competing at the NCAA East Regional in Lexington, Kentucky on 29 May, he ran 44.35 seconds for the 400 metres to qualify for the 2026 NCAA Outdoor Championships. At the 2026 NCAA Outdoor Championships, Simms ran a personal best 43.92 seconds in the 400 metres to place second behind Samuel Ogazi. That day, he also ran the anchor leg as Georgia won the 4 x 400m relay title in 2:57.93. He split 42.99 seconds, the 3rd fastest all-time relay split at the time.
