= Mohammed Ashfaq =

Indian sprinter (born 2007)

Personal information
- Born: 26 June 2007 (age 19)

Sport
- Sport: Athletics
- Event: 400 metres
Medal record
Men's athletics
Representing India
Asian Games
Bronze medal – third place	2026 Aichi–Nagoya	4×400m
South Asian Championships
Gold medal – first place	2025 Ranchi	4×400m mixed
Silver medal – second place	2025 Ranchi	400 m
Silver medal – second place	2025 Ranchi	4×400m

Mohammed Ashfaq (born 26 June 2007) is an Indian sprinter who specialises in the 400 m events.

== Career ==
Ashfaq competed at the 2025 South Asian Athletics Championships in Ranchi, where he won three medals. He won the silver medal in the men's 400 metres and was also part of the Indian men's 4 × 400 metres relay team that won silver. He won a gold medal as part of India's mixed 4 × 400 metres relay team.

In 2026, Ashfaq competed at the 2026 World Athletics U20 Championships in Eugene, Oregon. In the heats of the men's 400 metres, he ran 45.81 seconds, setting an Indian under-20 national record and qualifying for the semi-finals.

He advanced to the final after recording 46.00 seconds in the semi-finals. In the final, he finished eighth with a time of 46.20 seconds.

== Personal bests ==
Event	Time	Date	Venue
400 metres	45.81	6 August 2026	Eugene, Oregon, United States
