= Taylor Ewert =

American track and field athlete

Personal information
- Nationality: American
- Born: November 21, 2001 (age 24)

Sport
- Sport: Racewalking; Steeplechase; Cross country; Track and Field
- Events: 800 meters, Mile run, 3200 m, Mile, 10,000 and 20,000 meter Racewalks, Cross Country, pole vault
- College team: University of Arkansas
- Team: Beavercreek High School
- Coached by: Lance Harter (2020–); Howard Russ (2016–2020)

Taylor Ewert (born November 21, 2001) is an American long-distance runner and college track and field athlete for the University of Arkansas and Michigan State University. In high school, she set numerous records and was the cross country OHSAA Division I individual state champion in 2019, representing Beavercreek High School. Ewert committed to the University of Arkansas later that year, and in 2020, she was named the Gatorade National Girls Track and Field Athlete of the Year.

== Background ==
Taylor Ewert was born on November 21, 2001, and graduated from Beavercreek High School in 2020. Her parents Brian and Teri Ewert both ran cross country and track at Syracuse University. Her father, an engineer and retired Air Force Lieutenant Colonel, also competed in the steeplechase. Her mother is a physical therapist. Taylor has an older brother, Ben, who competes in cross country and track at University of Louisville and finished third in the 2000m steeplechase at the 2017 New Balance Nationals. Her younger brother, Connor, followed her by a year at Beavercreek and competes as well in both cross country and track. All three were coached by Howard Russ.

== 2018 ==
Taylor won the steeple in North Carolina 6:38.79, at the New Balance National Outdoor. The next day, a six-hundred mile drive away in Indianapolis, she competed in the USA Junior Championships racewalk, with a time of 49:07.52, lowering the U.S. Junior record by 24 seconds and finishing four minutes faster than the first boy. On July 14, Ewert completed the 10,000 meter race walk in 45:57.81 in Tampere, Finland, in the U20 (Under 20) games, setting an American Junior record in the process. In her junior year, Ewert finished 2nd in the Footlocker Midwest Regional Cross Championships in 18:08.9k trailing senior Emily Covert who ran 17:58.3, but ahead of Zofia Dudek, Katelynne Hart, and frosh standout, Abby Vanderkooi. On December 1, Ewert, finished third, behind another junior, two-time champion Katelyn Tuohy and runner-up Kelsey Chmiel, a senior, in the Nike Girls Cross County Nationals. In the Foot Locker/New Balance National Championship in San Diego's Balboa Park, she finished fourth to Sydney Masciarelli, who ran 17:00.3, who barely edged Hart, Ewert running six seconds behind Vanderkooi in 17:20.1 and ahead of Covert.

She was the Gatorade Ohio cross country girls Player of the Year, winning the state 5K title in 16:57.90, the best state high school performance in 37 years. Ewert also holds outdoor American Junior records in the 3K and 5K race walk and three more indoor American Junior records in the 1500m, mile and 3K. She was named the USA Track and Field Youth Athlete of the Year for 2018.

== 2019 ==
Ewert's 3,000 meter racewalk time set in the Virginia Showcase indoor meet in January, had her as the eighth fastest in the world for the year, by February 9, 2019. On February 9, 2019, at the Millrose Games in New York City, she set the high school indoor record at 6:38:21 in the one mile walk while winning against professionals, then finished in sixth place in the very fast high school girls invitational mile run in 4:51.97, for a personal record, on the same night. On March 10, also in New York, Ewert finished fourth behind winner Tuohy in the New Balance Indoor Two Mile, in 10:19.14. Ewert won the 5k Penn Relays racewalk on April 29, recording 22:28.61, an American Junior record, the second-fastest time of the year by that date, in the world for any age, and the best for a U20 athlete. Ewert also has an 11' 2.75" personal best in the pole vault. On May 9, she won the Great Western Ohio Conference mile in a P.R. 4:51.25. The next evening, she won the GWOC 3200 meter race in a P.R. 10:17:85. On June 1, she won the state DIV I 3,200 title in 10:23:14. With a 2:10 leg, she also anchored her Beavercreek 4x800 relay to an 8:58.95 for third in the state, but also 3rd fastest high school time in the U.S. for the year, to that point. On June 15, she broke the steeplechase meet record at the New Balance Nationals, with 6:33:61, and six hours later ran a 2:12 third leg helping her 4x800 team to a second place. On June 16, she finished second in the mile at 4:48.01. On June 23, she repeated as U20 racewalk champion in 48:24.61, breaking her meet record, almost eight minutes ahead of the runner-up and over five and a quarter minutes faster than the winner of the male race that immediately followed hers.

In 2019 Cross Country, Ewert set the record for Ohio high school girls running 5,000 meters in 17:03.2. She finished third in the Nike Midwest Regional meet behind Dudek and Hart, in 17:08.6. Her Beavercreek team finished second to qualify both for the Nike National Championship race held in December in Portland, Oregon. At the Foot Locker Midwest Regional Championships, on November 30, Ewert finished third again but closer, following Vanderkooi who ran 17:17.8 and Dudek, in 17:20.5, running 17:24.9 this time with Hart following in fourth in 17:34.6. At the Nike national championship race in Portland, Oregon, Ewert closed a substantial mid-race gap and barely missed dethroning Tuohy, who was competing for her third straight national title, trailing by only 7 tenths of a second, running 17:19.1 on a muddy course. Her team finished second as well. A week later at Balboa Park, returning to the Foot Locker National Championships for her final high school cross country race, Ewert finished sixth in 17:16.4, ahead of Masciarelli, but two seconds behind Hart. Dudek edged Marlee Starliper for the gold, over 30 seconds ahead of Ewert, with sophomore Vanderkooi third, also under 17 minutes. It was the first time in race history that two girls ran sub-17 minutes. Taylor committed to the University of Arkansas in October 2019.

== 2020 ==
Competing indoors on January 17, Ewert lowered her own national Junior (Under 20) and high school 3,000 meter racewalk record to 13:00.56. She repeated her 2019 Millrose Open Women's mile walk victory with a 6:34.63 on February 8, 2020. In that race Lauren Harris finished second in 6:39.31. After a 19-year hiatus, Robyn Stevens, 2020 pandemic-delayed Olympic 20k race walker, placed third in 6:41:30 while setting a U.S. 35-39 age group record.

At the University of Kentucky indoor High School Invitational Meet on February 15, Ewert won the two-mile run with a personal best of 10:18. On June 30, 2020, Ewert was named the Gatorade National Girls Track and Field Athlete of the Year.

== 2021 ==
Ewert was ranked 99th in the world racewalk rankings in 2021, with only two women younger than she ahead of her, and only three Americans higher on the list. Although she stayed with the leader, veteran Robyn Stevens, in the early stages of the COVID-19 pandemic-delayed U.S. Olympic Trials qualifier, held on June 27, 2021, in Eugene, Oregon, she finished sixth in the race in 1:43:41.

== 2022 ==
Ewert missed almost an entire year of competition, sidelined with a foot injury. In her first race of the cross country season she won the Cowboy Invitational in Oklahoma, leading her team to a win.
