= 2026 World Athletics U20 Championships – Mixed 4 × 400 metres relay =

Mixed's 4 × 400 metres relay at the 2026 World Athletics U20 Championships
- Venue: Hayward Field
- Dates: 5 August (Round 1 & Final)
- Competitors: 88 from 20 nations
- Winning time: 3:15.31 CR

Medalists
gold medal	Joshua Shelton; Taylor-Nicole Overton; Jaelen Hunter; Olivia Harris; Natalie Dumas*	United States
silver medal	Lukáš Mareš; Sophie Pischnothová; Jakub Marek; Linda Botková; Kateřina Čechová	Czech Republic
bronze medal	Dylan Ruming; Xanthee Watts; Fred Hamblin; Charlotte McAuliffe	Australia

The mixed 4 × 400 metres relay at the 2026 World Athletics U20 Championships will be held at Hayward Field in Eugene, United States on 5 and 8 August 2026.

== Results ==
=== Round 1 ===
Round 1 took place in the morning session on 5 August 2026. First 3 of each heat (Q) qualify to the final.

==== Heat 1 ====
Place	Nation	Athletes	Time	Notes
1	Great Britain	Luc MacLeod, Caitlin Hadfield, Lucas Cameron, Noa Chodokufa	3:21.27	Q, SB
2	Poland	Oliwier Frąckowiak, Lena Pajęcka, Bartłomiej Adamczyk, Jasmine Maria Kanakanti	3:21.47	Q, SB
3	Czech Republic	Lukáš Mareš, Kateřina Čechová, Jakub Marek, Sophie Pischnothová	3:21.58	Q, NUR20R
4	India	Piyush Raj, Tahura Khatun, Sayed Sabeer, Thiya Arumugam	3:22.85	SB
5	Mexico	Carlos Daniel Fierro, Luna Govea, Gerardo Hernández, Alisson Judith Martinez	3:26.30	
6	Slovakia	Zoltán Hogya, Lucia Bortlíková, Tomáš Žigo, Anabel Beláková	3:29.20	

==== Heat 2 ====
Place	Nation	Athletes	Time	Notes
1	Jamaica	Jabari Matheson, Shameika McLean, Jordan Rehedul, Kristen Herbert	3:21.47	Q, SB
2	South Africa	Ryno Riekert, Zanté van der Merwe, Abelines Schoeman, Isabella Gunter	3:22.12	Q, NUR20R
3	Colombia	Juan Sebastián Sánchez, Isabella Hurtado, Sergio Rojas, Sara Cuesta	3:22.14	Q, NUR20R
4	Germany	Amir Bilal Chaib Cuti, Ida Carlotta Schröder, Michal Fatyga, Hannah Schwind	3:22.44	SB
5	Italy	Riccardo Fumagalli, Laura Frattaroli, Nicolo' Borello, Matilde Abelli	3:22.97	NUR20R
6	Zimbabwe	Nenyasha Chihora, Nataly Varaidzo Shoko, Emmanuel Uriga, Anesu Nyahuma	3:34.67	
7	Papua New Guinea	Calvert Avae, Hephzibah Romalus, Ethan Asimba, Althea Dale	3:50.37	PB

==== Heat 3 ====
Place	Nation	Athletes	Time	Notes
1	United States	Joshua Shelton, Natalie Dumas, Jaelen Hunter, Olivia Harris	3:18.26	Q, WU20L
2	Australia	Dylan Ruming, Xanthee Watts, Fred Hamblin, Charlotte McAuliffe	3:19.59	Q, SB
3	Spain	Pablo Rojo, Rocio Navarro, Oscar Crespo, Ana Alba Ruiz	3:21.90	Q, PB
4	Belgium	Louis Smeets, Sterre Provost, Paul Noirhomme, Maya Wintquin	3:23.26	PB
5	Ecuador	Luis Alexander Campoverde, Pamela Nicol Barreto, Steven Mateus Mendez, Génesis Nicole Cañola	3:26.21	SB
—	Hungary	Péter Csaba Sáray, Sophia Akuchi Emmanuel, Benedek Tompa, Szonja Keszthelyi	DQ	TR24.6
—	Nigeria	David Dominion Udoh, Jecinta Lawrence, Perfect Faye, Faith Ezechukwu	DQ	TR17.2.3

=== Final ===
The final took place in the afternoon session on 5 August 2026.

Place	Nation	Athletes	Time	Notes
1st place, gold medalist(s)	United States	Joshua Shelton, Taylor-Nicole Overton, Jaelen Hunter, Olivia Harris	3:15.31	CR
2nd place, silver medalist(s)	Czech Republic	Lukáš Mareš, Sophie Pischnothová, Jakub Marek, Linda Botková	3:18.16	NU20R
3rd place, bronze medalist(s)	Australia	Dylan Ruming, Xanthee Watts, Fred Hamblin, Charlotte McAuliffe	3:18.45	AU20R
4	Jamaica	Jabari Matheson, Kristen Herbert, Jason Pitter, Kevongaye Fowler	3:18.78	NU20R
5	Great Britain	Luc MacLeod, Shiloh Omotosho, Lucas Cameron, Camiah Bennett	3:20.50	NU20R
6	South Africa	Ryno Riekert, Davida Strong, Abelines Schoeman, Isabella Gunter	3:21.48	NU20R
7	Spain	Pablo Rojo, Rocio Navarro, Oscar Crespo, Ana Alba Ruiz	3:23.51	
8	Colombia	Juan Sebastián Sánchez, Isabella Hurtado, Sergio Rojas, Sara Cuesta	3:24.02	
—	Poland	Oliwier Frąckowiak, Maja Zbielska, Bartłomiej Adamczyk, Jasmine Maria Kanakanti	DQ	TR17.2.3
