= Gilliam Indoor Track Stadium =

Sports venue in College Station, Texas

- Interactive map of Gilliam Indoor Track Stadium
- Full name: The Rhonda & Frosty Gilliam Indoor Track Stadium
- Location: College Station, Texas, United States
- Coordinates: 30.6079°N 96.3403°W
- Owner: Texas A&M University
- Operator: Texas A&M University
- Capacity: 5,000
- Surface: Mondotrack FTX

Construction
- Opened: January 24, 2009
- Closed: 2022
- Demolished: 2022

Tenants
- Texas A&M indoor track (2009–present)

The Gilliam Indoor Track Stadium was the home of the Texas A&M Aggies men's and women's collegiate indoor track and field teams. Opened on January 24, 2009, the facility hosted the 2009 Big 12 Conference indoor track championships as well as the 2009 NCAA Division I indoor track national championships. It was demolished after its final event, the SEC Indoor Championships on February 25 and 26, 2022.
