= Quincy Wilson (runner) =

American athlete (born 2008)

Quincy Wilson OLY
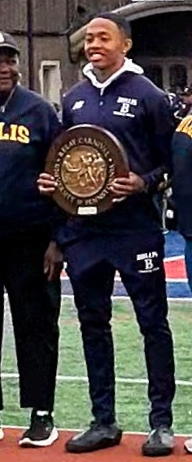
- Wilson at the 2024 Penn Relays

Personal information
- Born: January 8, 2008 (age 18) New London, CT, U.S.
- Education: Bullis School
- Height: 1.75 m (5 ft 9 in)

Sport
- Country: United States
- Sport: Athletics
- Event: 400 m
- Coached by: Joe Lee

Achievements and titles
- Personal bests: Outdoor; 200 m: 22.15 (Greensboro 2022); 400 m: 44.10 WU18B (Memphis 2025); 800 m: 1:50.44 (Myrtle Beach 2024); Indoor; 200 m: 21.02i (Virginia Beach 2024); 300 m: 32.94i (New York City 2025); 400 m: 45.37i (Boston 2026); 500 m: 1:00.22i AU20B (Philadelphia 2026); 600 m: 1:16.20i AU18B (New York City 2025)
Medal record
Men's athletics
Representing the United States
Olympic Games
Gold medal – first place	2024 Paris	4 × 400 m relay
World U20 Championships
Silver medal – second place	2026 Eugene	400m
Gold medal – first place	2026 Eugene	4 × 400 m relay

Quincy Wilson, OLY (born January 8, 2008) is an American track and field athlete who specializes in the 400 meters. In March 2024, competing for Maryland's Bullis School, he set an under-18 world best for the indoor 400-meter dash. In July 2024, he set the under-18 world best for the outdoor version of the same event. In setting these records, Wilson is also the American high school record holder in the indoor and outdoor 400 meters.

At age 16, he qualified for the men's 4 × 400 m relay pool for the 2024 Summer Olympics, becoming the youngest American track & field male Olympian in history. At the Games, Team USA won the gold medal in the 4 x 400 meters. Although Wilson only competed in the heats, he by extension also earned gold, becoming the second youngest track and field Olympic gold medalist in history.

== Early and personal life ==
Wilson started athletics as an 8-year-old. His parents Monique and Roy Wilson decided to relocate from Chesapeake, Virginia to Gaithersburg, Maryland so he could attend Bullis School in Potomac, Maryland, from which his cousin, Shaniya Hall, graduated in 2020 before running track at University of Oregon. He has an older sister named Kadence. Showing talent from an early age, he broke Obea Moore’s 30-year-old under-14 national record for the 400 meters. In 2025, he announced his commitment to compete in collegiate track and field for the Maryland Terrapins.

== Career ==
=== 2022 ===
In March 2022, Wilson ran a time of 48.41 seconds outdoors for the 400 meters as a 14 year-old. In August 2022, he won his fifth AAU Junior Olympic Games title, winning the 400 meters in a time of 47.77 seconds, having run 47.59 on the semi-finals. He also finished second in the 200 meters, in a time of 22.42 seconds.

=== 2023 ===
In March 2023, he won the New Balance Nationals Indoor title over 400 meters in Boston, Massachusetts with a time of 46.67 seconds. In April 2023, he ran a 400 meters split of 45.06 seconds at the Penn Relays in Philadelphia.

In June 2023, he finished second at the New Balance Nationals Outdoor over 400 meters, held in Franklin Field, Philadelphia. In September 2023, he became one of the youngest American athletes to sign a name, image and likeness (NIL) contract with a major sports brand company.

=== 2024 ===
At the VA Showcase in January, in the boys’ invitational 500 meters, Wilson ran a U.S. age-group No. 2 all-time mark of 1:01.27, narrowly missing Will Sumner’s national high school record by 0.02 seconds. He also was part of a sprint relay team that set a national high school record at the event.

In February, at the East Coast Invitational in Virginia Beach, he ran a personal best time of 21.02 seconds for the 200 meters. At the Millrose Games, Wilson ran the second fastest all-time high school boys' 600 m mark, with a time of 1:17.36. Also in February, Wilson ran a personal best time of 33.11 in the 300 m at the Ocean Breeze Elite Invitational.

In March, he retained his title at the New Balance Nationals Indoor 400 m title in Boston in a national high school indoors record time of 45.76 seconds. The time would have been enough to finish fourth in the final of the 400 meters at the 2024 World Athletics Indoor Championships, and surpassed the ratified 400 m under-18 world best of 46.01 seconds set by Tyrese Cooper in 2017. Wilson also anchored his school's 4 × 400 relay team who then broke their own national record again, this time with a mark of 3:11.87.

On March 29, Wilson ran 45.19 seconds for the 400 m at the Florida Relays.

On April 5, Wilson ran 1:50.44 in the 800 m, at the Beach Run Invitational in Myrtle Beach, South Carolina.

On April 27, Wilson split a 44.37 400 m as Bullis School's anchor leg in the preliminary High School Boys' 4 × 400 m at the Penn Relays. This stands as the fastest high school 400 meter split ever recorded at the Penn Relays. Later that day, in the High School Boys' 4 × 400 Championship of America, Wilson would split another sub-45 second 400 m anchor leg, with a time of 44.69.

In both the preliminaries and the finals, one of Wilson's teammates was tripped and had to recover the baton, giving Bullis a major setback. In the preliminaries, with his impressive 44.37 split, Wilson was able to close the gap, bringing his team home in a time of 3:14.84, thereby winning their heat and being the fourth fastest qualifier. However, in the finals, even with Wilson's 44.69 split, the gap to the leaders was too large, and could not be made up. In the finals, Bullis finished in third, in a time of 3:13.10. In second was Jamaica's Excelsior (3:12.94) and taking the win was Jamaica's Kingston College (3:11.86).

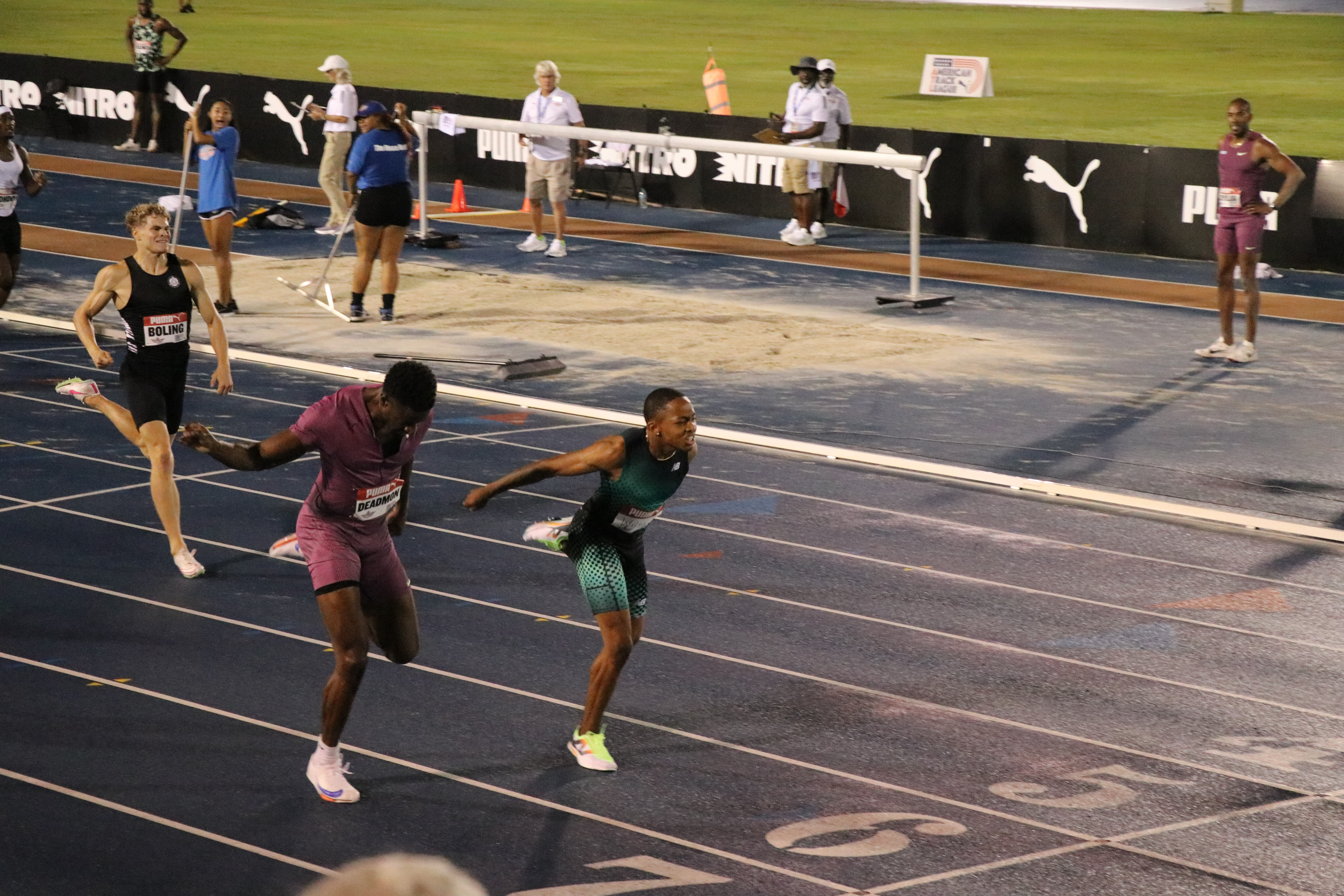
Quincy Wilson edges Bryce Deadmon to set the High School 400 m Record at the Holloway Pro Classic

On June 15, Wilson ran 45.13 in the Championship Boys' 400 m, at the New Balance Nationals Outdoor, placing first and setting a meet record.

On June 21, at the U.S. Olympic Trials, Wilson set the outdoor under-18 boys world best in the preliminaries of the 400 m, in a time of 44.66, which was the second fastest 400 m time of the day, only behind Quincy Hall's 44.60. He would then better this record 2 days later on June 23, with a time of 44.59 in the semifinals, which qualified him for the finals. Wilson placed sixth overall in the 400 m final, with a time of 44.94.

Although Wilson did not make the individual 400 meter team, he was added to the men's 4 × 400 m relay pool, making him the youngest American track & field male Olympian in history.

On July 19, in the final weeks before the 2024 Paris Olympics, Wilson improved his 400 meter personal best and under-18 world best to 44.20 at the Holloway Pro Classic in Gainesville. In a very close finish, Wilson outran Bryce Deadmon, with Deadmon just behind Wilson at 44.23.

On August 9, in the heats of the 4 × 400 m relay at the 2024 Summer Olympics, Wilson was the leadoff leg, with Vernon Norwood second, Bryce Deadmon third, and Christopher Bailey fourth. He split a time of 47.27, which put him in seventh place when he handed off to Vernon Norwood while Botswana's Letsile Tebogo took the lead in a split of around 44.4. Although Wilson's split was well off his personal best and poor when compared to his teammates (Norwood at around 43.6, Deadmon at around 44.2, and Bailey at around 44.05), Team USA nonetheless qualified for the final in a time of 2:59.15 behind Great Britain (2:58.88) and Botswana (2:57.76). In the final on August 10, the United States, consisting of Bailey (44.45), Norwood (43.26), Deadmon (43.54), and Rai Benjamin (43.18), won gold in a new Olympic record of 2:54.43, which was 0.14 seconds off of the 4 x 400 m world record of 2:54.29, set in 1993 by an American team consisting of Andrew Valmon (44.43), Quincy Watts (43.59), Butch Reynolds (43.36), and Michael Johnson (42.91). By extension, for his participation in the heats, Wilson earned a gold medal.

On December 30, Wilson set a new personal best of 1:17.19 in the short track 600 meters, setting a new meet record in the event at the U.S. Marine Corps Holiday Classic at The Armory.

=== 2025 ===
On January 27, at the Virginia Showcase, Wilson lost to Andrew Salvodon in the short track 500 meters. Salvodon set a new U.S. high school national record in the event of 1:00.49, breaking Will Sumner's previous record of 1:01.25, while Wilson finished two seconds behind in 1:02.49.

On February 1, at the New Balance Grand Prix, Wilson, competing in the professional indoor 400 meters, improved his high school national record and under-18 world best in the event, running 45.66 to beat Will Sumner, Jereem Richards, and Zakithi Nene. He finished fifth over 400 metres at the 2025 USA Indoor Track and Field Championships.

On July 22, he lowered his personal best to 44.10 seconds for the 400 meters at the Ed Murphey Track Classic, a World Athletics Continental Tour Silver event, in Memphis, Tennessee. The time moved him to No. 2 on the all-time under-20 list behind Steve Lewis who ran 43.87 to win gold at the 1988 Olympic Games, and also moved him to No. 2 on the all-time performance list, ahead of the 44.11 seconds run by Lewis in the U.S. Olympic trials that year. On August 1, at the 2025 USA Outdoor Track and Field Championships, Wilson was eliminated in the semifinal round of the 400 meters, finishing fourth in his heat with a time of 45.39. On November 24, he announced his commitment to join the University of Maryland's track and field program for 2026.

=== 2026 ===
In August 2026, Wilson won the individual silver medal in the 400 metres and the gold medal in the men’s 4 x 400 metres relay at the 2026 World Athletics U20 Championships in Eugene.

== Achievements ==
Information from World Athletics profile unless otherwise noted.

=== Personal bests ===
Distance	Time (s)	Wind	Location	Date	Notes
200 meters	22.15	-2.0 m/s	Greensboro, US	August 3, 2022	
200 metres (i)	22.49	—N/a	Virginia Beach, US	March 20, 2022	
300 metres (i)	33.11	—N/a	New York, US	February 24, 2024	
400 meters	44.10	—N/a	Memphis, US	July 12, 2025	WYB
400 metres (i)	45.37	—N/a	Boston, US	March 14, 2026	
500 metres (i)	1:00.22	—N/a	Philadelphia, US	February 28, 2026	
600 metres (i)	1:17.19	—N/a	New York, US	December 28, 2024	

=== International competitions ===
Representing the United States
Year	Competition	Venue	Position	Event	Time	Notes
2024	Olympic Games	Paris, France	1st	4 × 400 m relay	Series participation	OR
2026	World U20 Championships	Eugene, OR, United States	2nd	400 m	44.62	
2026	World U20 Championships	Eugene, OR, United States	1st	4 × 400 m relay	3:01.39	

=== National championships ===
Year	Competition	Venue	Position	Event	Time	Wind (m/s)	Notes
2023	USATF U20 Championships	Eugene, Oregon	4th	400 m	46.12	-	
2024	U.S. Olympic Trials	Eugene, Oregon	6th	400 m	45.44	-	
2025	USATF Championships	Eugene, Oregon	11th (h)	400 m	45.39	-	
2026	USATF U20 Championships	Eugene, Oregon	2nd	400 m	44.84	-	

== Awards ==
- Night of Legends Award 2024: USATF Youth Athlete of the Year

Records
Preceded by (United States) Justin Robinson	Boys' World Youth Best Holder, 400 metres June 21, 2024 – present	Incumbent
