= Georgia Tech Yellow Jackets track and field =

College track and field team

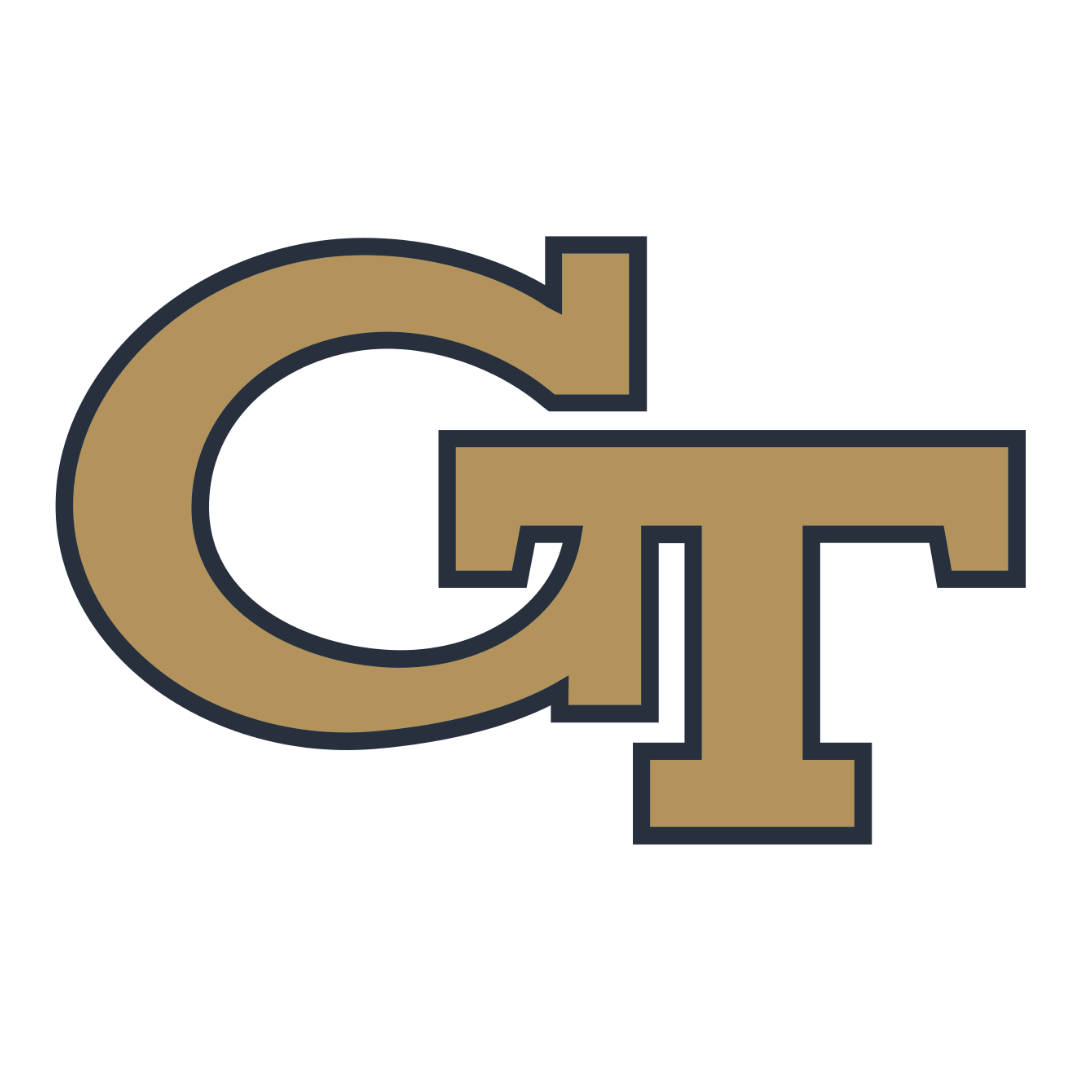
- University: Georgia Tech
- Head coach: Grover Hinsdale (men); Alan Drosky (women)
- Conference: ACC
- Location: Atlanta, Georgia
- Outdoor track: George C. Griffin Track and Field Facility
- Nickname: Yellow Jackets
- Colors: Gold and white

The Georgia Tech Yellow Jackets track and field team is the track and field program that represents Georgia Tech. The Yellow Jackets compete in NCAA Division I as a member of the Atlantic Coast Conference. The team is based in Atlanta, Georgia at the George C. Griffin Track and Field Facility.

The program is coached by Grover Hinsdale (men) and Alan Drosky (women). The track and field program officially encompasses four teams, as the NCAA regards men's and women's indoor track and field and outdoor track and field as separate sports.

Sprinter Derek Mills has the most NCAA championship titles of any Yellow Jacket, with three 4 × 400 m championships and one individual 400 m win.

== Postseason ==
As of 2024, a total of 42 men and 20 women have achieved individual first-team All-American status at the Division I men's outdoor, women's outdoor, men's indoor, or women's indoor national championships.

First team All-Americans
Team	Championships	Name	Event	Place	Ref.
Men's	1921 Outdoor	Longino Welch	Pole vault	1st	
Men's	1922 Outdoor	Homer Whelchel	Javelin throw	5th	
Men's	1923 Outdoor	Homer Whelchel	Javelin throw	3rd	
Men's	1926 Outdoor	Ernest Kontz	400 meters	6th	
Men's	1927 Outdoor	Ernest Kontz	400 meters	4th	
Men's	1927 Outdoor	Ed Hamm	Long jump	1st	
Men's	1928 Outdoor	Ernest Kontz	400 meters	6th	
Men's	1928 Outdoor	Ed Hamm	Long jump	1st	
Men's	1930 Outdoor	Ed Hamm	Long jump	2nd	
Men's	1930 Outdoor	Douglas Graydon	Long jump	5th	
Men's	1936 Outdoor	Perrin Walker	100 meters	8th	
Men's	1936 Outdoor	Perrin Walker	200 meters	7th	
Men's	1937 Outdoor	Charles Belcher	400 meters	4th	
Men's	1938 Outdoor	Charles Belcher	220 yards hurdles	5th	
Men's	1938 Outdoor	Robert Aldridge	3000 meters	4th	
Men's	1939 Outdoor	Charles Belcher	400 meters	7th	
Men's	1952 Outdoor	Ed Baskin	Javelin throw	8th	
Men's	1955 Outdoor	Carl Vereen	Discus throw	3rd	
Men's	1956 Outdoor	Fred Berman	Shot put	8th	
Men's	1960 Outdoor	Ron Ablowich	400 meters hurdles	2nd	
Men's	1960 Outdoor	Ed Nutting	Shot put	4th	
Men's	1961 Outdoor	Ron Ablowich	400 meters hurdles	4th	
Men's	1968 Outdoor	Ben Vaughn	100 meters	7th	
Men's	1968 Outdoor	Ben Vaughn	200 meters	5th	
Men's	1973 Indoor	Mike Beck	600 yards	5th	
Men's	1977 Outdoor	Larry Lowe	Triple jump	8th	
Men's	1978 Outdoor	Dexter Rowland	High jump	8th	
Men's	1983 Indoor	Carlyle Bernard	4 × 400 meters relay	4th	
Men's	1983 Indoor	Thomas Hind	4 × 400 meters relay	4th	
Men's	1983 Indoor	James Stanley	4 × 400 meters relay	4th	
Men's	1983 Indoor	Mike Armour	4 × 400 meters relay	4th	
Men's	1984 Indoor	Antonio McKay	400 meters	1st	
Men's	1984 Outdoor	Antonio McKay	400 meters	1st	
Men's	1985 Indoor	Antonio McKay	400 meters	2nd	
Men's	1985 Indoor	Mike Armour	500 meters	3rd	
Men's	1985 Outdoor	Dirk Morris	110 meters hurdles	4th	
Men's	1986 Indoor	James Purvis	55 meters hurdles	6th	
Men's	1986 Indoor	Alan Drosky	Mile run	6th	
Men's	1986 Outdoor	James Purvis	110 meters hurdles	7th	
Men's	1987 Outdoor	James Purvis	110 meters hurdles	3rd	
Men's	1987 Outdoor	Eric Smith	3000 meters steeplechase	5th	
Women's	1987 Outdoor	Kathy Harrison	400 meters hurdles	7th	
Women's	1987 Outdoor	Kathy Harrison	Triple jump	4th	
Men's	1988 Indoor	James Purvis	55 meters hurdles	1st	
Men's	1988 Outdoor	James Purvis	110 meters hurdles	1st	
Men's	1988 Outdoor	Dirk Morris	110 meters hurdles	5th	
Women's	1989 Indoor	Shellie O'Neal	800 meters	7th	
Men's	1989 Outdoor	Derrick Adkins	400 meters hurdles	5th	
Men's	1989 Outdoor	Richard Thompson	Triple jump	7th	
Men's	1990 Outdoor	Derrick Adkins	400 meters hurdles	6th	
Men's	1990 Outdoor	Mark White	Discus throw	7th	
Women's	1990 Outdoor	Karen Hoffman	5000 meters	7th	
Men's	1991 Indoor	Uwezu McReynolds	55 meters hurdles	6th	
Men's	1991 Outdoor	Derek Mills	400 meters	7th	
Men's	1991 Outdoor	Derrick Adkins	400 meters hurdles	2nd	
Men's	1991 Outdoor	Richard Thompson	Triple jump	7th	
Women's	1991 Outdoor	Janeen Jones	4 × 400 meters relay	8th	
Women's	1991 Outdoor	Shellie O'Neal	4 × 400 meters relay	8th	
Women's	1991 Outdoor	Melissa Edwards	4 × 400 meters relay	8th	
Women's	1991 Outdoor	Nelrae Pasha	4 × 400 meters relay	8th	
Men's	1992 Indoor	Octavius Terry	4 × 400 meters relay	3rd	
Men's	1992 Indoor	Conrad Nichols	4 × 400 meters relay	3rd	
Men's	1992 Indoor	Derrick Adkins	4 × 400 meters relay	3rd	
Men's	1992 Indoor	Derek Mills	4 × 400 meters relay	3rd	
Women's	1992 Indoor	Nelrae Pasha	400 meters	2nd	
Women's	1992 Indoor	Natasha Alleyne	High jump	1st	
Men's	1992 Outdoor	Derek Mills	400 meters	3rd	
Men's	1992 Outdoor	Octavius Terry	400 meters hurdles	3rd	
Men's	1992 Outdoor	Derrick Adkins	400 meters hurdles	8th	
Men's	1992 Outdoor	Octavius Terry	4 × 400 meters relay	1st	
Men's	1992 Outdoor	Julian Amedee	4 × 400 meters relay	1st	
Men's	1992 Outdoor	Derrick Adkins	4 × 400 meters relay	1st	
Men's	1992 Outdoor	Derek Mills	4 × 400 meters relay	1st	
Women's	1992 Outdoor	Nelrae Pasha	400 meters	3rd	
Men's	1993 Indoor	Derek Mills	400 meters	3rd	
Men's	1993 Indoor	Conrad Nichols	800 meters	6th	
Men's	1993 Indoor	Guy Robinson	4 × 400 meters relay	1st	
Men's	1993 Indoor	Julian Amadee	4 × 400 meters relay	1st	
Men's	1993 Indoor	Derrick Adkins	4 × 400 meters relay	1st	
Men's	1993 Indoor	Derek Mills	4 × 400 meters relay	1st	
Women's	1993 Indoor	Nelrae Pasha	400 meters	4th	
Men's	1993 Outdoor	Derek Mills	400 meters	3rd	
Men's	1993 Outdoor	Conrad Nichols	800 meters	3rd	
Men's	1993 Outdoor	Guy Robinson	4 × 400 meters relay	3rd	
Men's	1993 Outdoor	Julian Amedee	4 × 400 meters relay	3rd	
Men's	1993 Outdoor	Conrad Nichols	4 × 400 meters relay	3rd	
Men's	1993 Outdoor	Derek Mills	4 × 400 meters relay	3rd	
Women's	1993 Outdoor	Nelrae Pasha	400 meters	2nd	
Men's	1994 Indoor	Conrad Nichols	800 meters	7th	
Men's	1994 Indoor	Octavius Terry	4 × 400 meters relay	3rd	
Men's	1994 Indoor	Jonas Motiejunas	4 × 400 meters relay	3rd	
Men's	1994 Indoor	Conrad Nichols	4 × 400 meters relay	3rd	
Men's	1994 Indoor	Derek Mills	4 × 400 meters relay	3rd	
Women's	1994 Indoor	Janeen Jones	400 meters	2nd	
Men's	1994 Outdoor	Derek Mills	400 meters	1st	
Men's	1994 Outdoor	Octavius Terry	400 meters hurdles	1st	
Men's	1994 Outdoor	Conrad Nichols	800 meters	5th	
Men's	1994 Outdoor	Octavius Terry	4 × 400 meters relay	1st	
Men's	1994 Outdoor	Jonas Motiejunas	4 × 400 meters relay	1st	
Men's	1994 Outdoor	Conrad Nichols	4 × 400 meters relay	1st	
Men's	1994 Outdoor	Derek Mills	4 × 400 meters relay	1st	
Women's	1994 Outdoor	Janeen Jones	400 meters	2nd	
Men's	1995 Indoor	Octavius Terry	400 meters	5th	
Men's	1995 Outdoor	Octavius Terry	400 meters hurdles	2nd	
Men's	1996 Indoor	Eric Bowers	Long jump	5th	
Women's	1996 Indoor	Beth Mallory	Mile run	6th	
Men's	1996 Outdoor	Jonas Motiejunas	4 × 400 meters relay	7th	
Men's	1996 Outdoor	David Krummenacker	4 × 400 meters relay	7th	
Men's	1996 Outdoor	Conrad Nichols	4 × 400 meters relay	7th	
Men's	1996 Outdoor	Octavius Terry	4 × 400 meters relay	7th	
Men's	1996 Outdoor	Eric Bowers	Long jump	2nd	
Men's	1997 Indoor	Angelo Taylor	400 meters	3rd	
Men's	1997 Indoor	David Krummenacker	800 meters	1st	
Men's	1997 Indoor	Michael Johnson	4 × 400 meters relay	6th	
Men's	1997 Indoor	David Krummenacker	4 × 400 meters relay	6th	
Men's	1997 Indoor	Tomas Motiejunas	4 × 400 meters relay	6th	
Men's	1997 Indoor	Angelo Taylor	4 × 400 meters relay	6th	
Men's	1997 Indoor	Eric Bowers	Long jump	3rd	
Men's	1997 Outdoor	Angelo Taylor	400 meters hurdles	2nd	
Men's	1997 Outdoor	David Krummenacker	800 meters	4th	
Men's	1998 Indoor	Angelo Taylor	400 meters	3rd	
Men's	1998 Indoor	David Krummenacker	800 meters	1st	
Men's	1998 Indoor	Angelo Taylor	4 × 400 meters relay	7th	
Men's	1998 Indoor	Jonas Motiejunas	4 × 400 meters relay	7th	
Men's	1998 Indoor	Tomas Motiejunas	4 × 400 meters relay	7th	
Men's	1998 Indoor	David Krummenacker	4 × 400 meters relay	7th	
Women's	1998 Indoor	Andria King	55 meters hurdles	2nd	
Men's	1998 Outdoor	Angelo Taylor	400 meters hurdles	1st	
Men's	1998 Outdoor	David Krummenacker	800 meters	2nd	
Men's	1998 Outdoor	Tomas Motiejunas	4 × 400 meters relay	1st	
Men's	1998 Outdoor	Michael Johnson	4 × 400 meters relay	1st	
Men's	1998 Outdoor	Jonas Motiejunas	4 × 400 meters relay	1st	
Men's	1998 Outdoor	Angelo Taylor	4 × 400 meters relay	1st	
Women's	1998 Outdoor	Andria King	100 meters hurdles	2nd	
Women's	1999 Indoor	Andria King	60 meters hurdles	2nd	
Women's	1999 Indoor	Lynn Houston	High jump	4th	
Men's	1999 Outdoor	Michael Johnson	4 × 400 meters relay	5th	
Men's	1999 Outdoor	Tosin Tomori	4 × 400 meters relay	5th	
Men's	1999 Outdoor	Bryan Swarn	4 × 400 meters relay	5th	
Men's	1999 Outdoor	Jonas Motiejunas	4 × 400 meters relay	5th	
Women's	1999 Outdoor	Andria King	100 meters hurdles	2nd	
Women's	1999 Outdoor	Becky Megesi	1500 meters	8th	
Women's	2000 Indoor	Sara Pardue	Distance medley relay	7th	
Women's	2000 Indoor	Coquese Renfroe	Distance medley relay	7th	
Women's	2000 Indoor	Nicole Campbell	Distance medley relay	7th	
Women's	2000 Indoor	Becky Megesi	Distance medley relay	7th	
Men's	2000 Outdoor	Bryan Swarn	400 meters	7th	
Men's	2000 Outdoor	Michael Johnson	4 × 400 meters relay	6th	
Men's	2000 Outdoor	Aaron Sink	4 × 400 meters relay	6th	
Men's	2000 Outdoor	Sharif Azim	4 × 400 meters relay	6th	
Men's	2000 Outdoor	Bryan Swarn	4 × 400 meters relay	6th	
Men's	2000 Outdoor	Malcolm Leason	Triple jump	8th	
Men's	2002 Indoor	Brendon Mahoney	Mile run	7th	
Women's	2002 Outdoor	Renee Metivier	5000 meters	8th	
Women's	2003 Outdoor	Chaunte Howard	High jump	2nd	
Women's	2004 Indoor	Chaunte Howard	High jump	1st	
Women's	2004 Outdoor	Amandi Rhett	200 meters	8th	
Women's	2004 Outdoor	Dana Rogers	4 × 100 meters relay	6th	
Women's	2004 Outdoor	Ashlee Kidd	4 × 100 meters relay	6th	
Women's	2004 Outdoor	Andriane Lapsley	4 × 100 meters relay	6th	
Women's	2004 Outdoor	Amandi Rhett	4 × 100 meters relay	6th	
Women's	2004 Outdoor	Chaunte Howard	High jump	1st	
Men's	2005 Indoor	Montrell Person	60 meters hurdles	7th	
Women's	2005 Indoor	Chaunte Howard	High jump	1st	
Women's	2005 Outdoor	Ashlee Kidd	400 meters	5th	
Women's	2005 Outdoor	Chaunte Howard	High jump	2nd	
Women's	2006 Indoor	Brandy Depland	Triple jump	2nd	
Women's	2006 Outdoor	Ashlee Kidd	400 meters	5th	
Women's	2007 Indoor	Shantia Moss	60 meters hurdles	1st	
Women's	2007 Indoor	Ashlee Kidd	400 meters	3rd	
Women's	2007 Outdoor	Fatmata Fofanah	100 meters hurdles	4th	
Women's	2008 Indoor	Shantia Moss	60 meters hurdles	4th	
Women's	2008 Indoor	Fatmata Fofanah	60 meters hurdles	7th	
Men's	2008 Outdoor	James Lemons	Triple jump	5th	
Women's	2008 Outdoor	Shantia Moss	100 meters hurdles	3rd	
Men's	2009 Indoor	Alphonso Jordan	Triple jump	8th	
Men's	2009 Outdoor	Jerome Miller	High jump	4th	
Men's	2009 Outdoor	Steve Marcelle	Shot put	6th	
Men's	2010 Indoor	Alphonso Jordan	Triple jump	3rd	
Men's	2010 Indoor	Steve Marcelle	Shot put	4th	
Men's	2010 Outdoor	Alphonso Jordan	Triple jump	8th	
Women's	2013 Indoor	Julienne McKee	Triple jump	8th	
Men's	2013 Outdoor	Jonathan Gardner	Triple jump	7th	
Women's	2016 Indoor	Bria Matthews	Long jump	7th	
Women's	2016 Indoor	Bria Matthews	Triple jump	6th	
Women's	2019 Indoor	Bria Matthews	Triple jump	5th	
Women's	2019 Outdoor	Jeanine Williams	100 meters hurdles	4th	
Women's	2021 Outdoor	Bria Matthews	Long jump	4th	
Women's	2021 Outdoor	Bria Matthews	Triple jump	6th	

== See also ==
- Category:Georgia Tech Yellow Jackets men's track and field athletes (21)
- Category:Georgia Tech Yellow Jackets women's track and field athletes (6)
