= East Carolina Pirates track and field =

College track and field team

- University: East Carolina University
- Head coach: Virgil Givens
- Conference: AAC
- Location: Greenville, North Carolina
- Outdoor track: Bate Foundation Track & Field Facility
- Nickname: Pirates
- Colors: Purple and gold

The East Carolina Pirates track and field team is the track and field program that represents East Carolina University. The Pirates compete in NCAA Division I as a member of the American Conference. The team is based in Greenville, North Carolina at the Bate Foundation Track & Field Facility.

The program is coached by Virgil Givens. The track and field program officially encompasses four teams, as the NCAA regards men's and women's indoor track and field and outdoor track and field as separate sports.

In 2021, high jumper Ty Butts Townsend became the 3rd Pirates athlete to represent the United States at the Summer Olympics in athletics.

Julien Dunkley originally won the 60 metres at the 2003 NCAA Division I Indoor Track and Field Championships, winning in 6.54 seconds to become the Pirates' first individual national champion. However, he was later declared ineligible. The Pirates' most successful AIAW athlete was Minnie McPhatter, who finished 7th in the 800 m at the 1980 AIAW Outdoor Track and Field Championships.

== Postseason ==
As of 2024, a total of 10 men and 3 women have achieved individual All-American status at the men's outdoor, women's outdoor, men's indoor, or women's indoor national championships.

First Team All-Americans
Team	Championships	Name	Event	Place	Ref.
Men's	1973 Outdoor	Walter Davenport	Triple jump	7th	
Men's	1977 Outdoor	Calvin Alston	200 meters	5th	
Men's	1977 Outdoor	Herman McIntyre	Triple jump	7th	
Men's	1978 Outdoor	Calvin Alston	200 meters	6th	
Men's	1979 Outdoor	Otis Melvin	200 meters	5th	
Men's	1980 Indoor	Stanford Curry	4 × 400 meters relay	3rd	
Men's	1980 Indoor	Carlton Bell	4 × 400 meters relay	3rd	
Men's	1980 Indoor	Otis Melvin	4 × 400 meters relay	3rd	
Men's	1980 Indoor	Shawn Laney	4 × 400 meters relay	3rd	
Men's	1985 Outdoor	Lee McNeill	100 meters	4th	
Men's	1986 Indoor	Lee McNeill	55 meters	6th	
Men's	1986 Outdoor	Lee McNeill	100 meters	3rd	
Men's	1987 Indoor	Lee McNeill	55 meters	7th	
Men's	1987 Outdoor	Eugene McNeill	200 meters	7th	
Men's	1987 Outdoor	Eugene McNeill	4 × 100 meters relay	4th	
Men's	1987 Outdoor	Lee McNeill	4 × 100 meters relay	4th	
Men's	1987 Outdoor	Kevin Wrighton	4 × 100 meters relay	4th	
Men's	1987 Outdoor	John Lee	4 × 100 meters relay	4th	
Men's	1988 Indoor	Lee McNeill	55 meters	7th	
Men's	1988 Outdoor	Eugene McNeill	200 meters	6th	
Men's	1990 Indoor	Brian Irvin	400 meters	4th	
Men's	1990 Indoor	Damon Davis	4 × 400 meters relay	5th	
Men's	1990 Indoor	Fred Owens	4 × 400 meters relay	5th	
Men's	1990 Indoor	Corey Brooks	4 × 400 meters relay	5th	
Men's	1990 Indoor	Brian Irvin	4 × 400 meters relay	5th	
Men's	1991 Indoor	Damon Davis	4 × 400 meters relay	3rd	
Men's	1991 Indoor	Fred Owens	4 × 400 meters relay	3rd	
Men's	1991 Indoor	Corey Brooks	4 × 400 meters relay	3rd	
Men's	1991 Indoor	Brian Irvin	4 × 400 meters relay	3rd	
Men's	1991 Outdoor	Brian Irvin	400 meters	5th	
Men's	1991 Outdoor	Wiliam Davis	4 × 400 meters relay	8th	
Men's	1991 Outdoor	Fred Owens	4 × 400 meters relay	8th	
Men's	1991 Outdoor	Corey Brooks	4 × 400 meters relay	8th	
Men's	1991 Outdoor	Brian Irvin	4 × 400 meters relay	8th	
Men's	1992 Outdoor	Brian Irvin	400 meters	5th	
Women's	1994 Outdoor	Dava Rhodes	10,000 meters	8th	
Men's	1995 Outdoor	Lewis Harris	4 × 100 meters relay	8th	
Men's	1995 Outdoor	Brian Johnson	4 × 100 meters relay	8th	
Men's	1995 Outdoor	Keith Barker	4 × 100 meters relay	8th	
Men's	1995 Outdoor	Dwight Henry	4 × 100 meters relay	8th	
Men's	1997 Outdoor	James Alexander	4 × 400 meters relay	5th	
Men's	1997 Outdoor	Darrick Ingram	4 × 400 meters relay	5th	
Men's	1997 Outdoor	Mike Miller	4 × 400 meters relay	5th	
Men's	1997 Outdoor	Damon Davis	4 × 400 meters relay	5th	
Men's	2000 Indoor	Lawrence Ward	4 × 400 meters relay	3rd	
Men's	2000 Indoor	Darrick Ingram	4 × 400 meters relay	3rd	
Men's	2000 Indoor	James Alexander	4 × 400 meters relay	3rd	
Men's	2000 Indoor	Damon Davis	4 × 400 meters relay	3rd	
Men's	2000 Outdoor	Lawrence Ward	4 × 400 meters relay	7th	
Men's	2000 Outdoor	Darrick Ingram	4 × 400 meters relay	7th	
Men's	2000 Outdoor	James Alexander	4 × 400 meters relay	7th	
Men's	2000 Outdoor	Damon Davis	4 × 400 meters relay	7th	
Men's	2002 Indoor	Lawrence Ward	4 × 400 meters relay	5th	
Men's	2002 Indoor	Benjamin Henderson	4 × 400 meters relay	5th	
Men's	2002 Indoor	Frankie Greene	4 × 400 meters relay	5th	
Men's	2002 Indoor	Domonick Richmond	4 × 400 meters relay	5th	
Men's	2002 Outdoor	Darren Tuitt	4 × 100 meters relay	7th	
Men's	2002 Outdoor	Jeremy Carter	4 × 100 meters relay	7th	
Men's	2002 Outdoor	Benjamin Henderson	4 × 100 meters relay	7th	
Men's	2002 Outdoor	Julien Dunkley	4 × 100 meters relay	7th	
Men's	2002 Outdoor	Lawrence Ward	4 × 400 meters relay	4th	
Men's	2002 Outdoor	Frankie Greene	4 × 400 meters relay	4th	
Men's	2002 Outdoor	Dominick Richmond	4 × 400 meters relay	4th	
Men's	2002 Outdoor	Benjamin Henderson	4 × 400 meters relay	4th	
Men's	2003 Indoor	Julien Dunkley (Note: Placing later vacated)	60 meters	1st	
Men's	2006 Indoor	Eric Frasure	Weight throw	7th	
Men's	2007 Indoor	Eric Frasure	Weight throw	4th	
Women's	2010 Outdoor	Ty Butts Townsend	High jump	7th	
Women's	2011 Indoor	Ty Butts Townsend	High jump	4th	
Women's	2012 Indoor	Ty Butts Townsend	High jump	7th	
Women's	2012 Outdoor	Ty Butts Townsend	High jump	3rd	
Men's	2013 Outdoor	Cameron Hudson	Long jump	4th	
Women's	2013 Indoor	Ty Butts Townsend	High jump	2nd	
Women's	2014 Outdoor	Ty Butts Townsend	High jump	2nd	
Men's	2015 Indoor	Avion Jones	High jump	7th	
Men's	2015 Outdoor	Avion Jones	High jump	3rd	
Men's	2016 Outdoor	Avion Jones	High jump	4th	
Women's	2021 Outdoor	Sommer Knight	Pole vault	3rd	
Women's	2022 Outdoor	Sommer Knight	Pole vault	8th	

== See also ==
- Category:East Carolina Pirates men's track and field athletes (5)
- Category:East Carolina Pirates women's track and field athletes (2)
