= 4 × 400 meter relay at the NCAA Division I Outdoor Track and Field Championships =

This is a list of the NCAA Division I outdoor champions in the 4 × 440-yard relay until 1975, and the metric 4 × 400 meter relay since metrication occurred in 1976. Hand timing was used until 1973, while starting in 1974 fully automatic timing was used.

== Winners ==
Key
y=yards
A=Altitude assisted

Women's winners
Year	Team	Athlete	Split	Time
1982	Tennessee Volunteers	Cathy Rattray (JAM)	51.5	3:28.55
1982	Tennessee Volunteers	Sharieffa Barksdale	53.2	3:28.55
1982	Tennessee Volunteers	Joetta Clark	52.9	3:28.55
1982	Tennessee Volunteers	Delisa Walton	51.0	3:28.55
1983	Florida State Seminoles	Randy Givens	52.5	3:28.46
1983	Florida State Seminoles	Brenda Cliette	51.3	3:28.46
1983	Florida State Seminoles	Angela Wright	52.7	3:28.46
1983	Florida State Seminoles	Marita Payne (CAN)	52.0	3:28.46
1984	Florida State Seminoles	Janet Davis	54.0y	3:28.93y
1984	Florida State Seminoles	Brenda Cliette	51.5y	3:28.93y
1984	Florida State Seminoles	Randy Givens	51.9y	3:28.93y
1984	Florida State Seminoles	Marita Payne (CAN)	51.6y	3:28.93y
1985	LSU Lady Tigers	Wendy Truvillion	53.9	3:30.39
1985	LSU Lady Tigers	Schowanda Williams	52.0	3:30.39
1985	LSU Lady Tigers	Camille Cato (CAN)	52.6	3:30.39
1985	LSU Lady Tigers	Michele Morris	51.9	3:30.39
1986	Tennessee Volunteers	Carla McLaughlin	53.4	3:29.35
1986	Tennessee Volunteers	Robin Benjamin	54.5	3:29.35
1986	Tennessee Volunteers	LaVonna Martin	50.9	3:29.35
1986	Tennessee Volunteers	Ilrey Oliver (JAM)	50.6	3:29.35
1987	USC Trojans	Myra Mayberry	54.8	3:28.93
1987	USC Trojans	Gervaise McCraw	50.8	3:28.93
1987	USC Trojans	Michelle Taylor	52.0	3:28.93
1987	USC Trojans	Leslie Maxie	51.4	3:28.93
1988	UCLA Bruins	Monica Phillips	53.7	3:29.82
1988	UCLA Bruins	Gail Devers	51.4	3:29.82
1988	UCLA Bruins	Chewuakii Knighten	53.3	3:29.82
1988	UCLA Bruins	Janeene Vickers	51.4	3:29.82
1989	Texas Longhorns	Kellie Roberts	54.3	3:31.18A
1989	Texas Longhorns	Leslie Hardison	53.3	3:31.18A
1989	Texas Longhorns	Barbara Flowers	52.5	3:31.18A
1989	Texas Longhorns	Carlette Guidry	51.1	3:31.18A
1990	Florida Gators	Kim Mitchell	53.8	3:30.41
1990	Florida Gators	Anita Howard	52.1	3:30.41
1990	Florida Gators	Dorchelle Webster	53.0	3:30.41
1990	Florida Gators	Tasha Downing	51.5	3:30.41
1991	Nebraska Cornhuskers	Shanelle Porter	53.8	3:29.87
1991	Nebraska Cornhuskers	Tranquil Wilson	53.9	3:29.87
1991	Nebraska Cornhuskers	Kim Walker	51.1	3:29.87
1991	Nebraska Cornhuskers	Ximena Restrepo (CHI)	51.1	3:29.87
1992	Florida Gators	Nekita Beasley	53.9	3:27.53
1992	Florida Gators	Michelle Freeman (JAM)	52.1	3:27.53
1992	Florida Gators	Kim Mitchell	50.9	3:27.53
1992	Florida Gators	Anita Howard	50.6	3:27.53
1993	LSU Lady Tigers	Debbie Parris (JAM)	52.2	3:27.97
1993	LSU Lady Tigers	Indira Hamilton	52.6	3:27.97
1993	LSU Lady Tigers	Heather Van Norman	51.76	3:27.97
1993	LSU Lady Tigers	Youlanda Warren	51.5	3:27.97
1994	Seton Hall Pirates	Veronica Harris	54.5	3:30.58
1994	Seton Hall Pirates	Keisha Caine	52.6	3:30.58
1994	Seton Hall Pirates	Julia Sandiford (BAR)	52.7	3:30.58
1994	Seton Hall Pirates	Flirtisha Harris	50.8	3:30.58
1995	LSU Lady Tigers	LaTarsha Stroman	53.2	3:28.26
1995	LSU Lady Tigers	Sheila Powell	52.4	3:28.26
1995	LSU Lady Tigers	Charlene Maulseed (JAM)	51.5	3:28.26
1995	LSU Lady Tigers	Youlanda Warren	51.2	3:28.26
1996	Texas Longhorns	Dana Riley	53.6	3:27.50
1996	Texas Longhorns	Suziann Reid	51.8	3:27.50
1996	Texas Longhorns	Donna Howard	51.5	3:27.50
1996	Texas Longhorns	Toya Brown	50.6	3:27.50
1997	Texas Longhorns	Dana Riley	52.8	3:28.43
1997	Texas Longhorns	Donna Howard	52.1	3:28.43
1997	Texas Longhorns	Toya Brown	51.48	3:28.43
1997	Texas Longhorns	Suziann Reid	52.04	3:28.43
1998	Texas Longhorns	Angel Patterson	53.8	3:28.65
1998	Texas Longhorns	Aminah Haddad	51.5	3:28.65
1998	Texas Longhorns	Toya Brown	52.8	3:28.65
1998	Texas Longhorns	Suziann Reid	50.6	3:28.65
1999	Texas Longhorns	Angel Patterson	53.3	3:27.08
1999	Texas Longhorns	Aminah Haddad	51.2	3:27.08
1999	Texas Longhorns	Tanya Jarrett (JAM)	52.0	3:27.08
1999	Texas Longhorns	Suziann Reid	50.6	3:27.08
2000	South Carolina Gamecocks	Lisa Barber	52.5	3:28.64
2000	South Carolina Gamecocks	Demetria Washington	51.5	3:28.64
2000	South Carolina Gamecocks	Ellakisha Williamson	53.8	3:28.64
2000	South Carolina Gamecocks	Mikele Barbe	50.8	3:28.64
2001	Clemson Tigers	Michelle Burgher (JAM)	53.8	3:29.97
2001	Clemson Tigers	Cydonie Mothersill (CAY)	51.8	3:29.97
2001	Clemson Tigers	Marcia Smith	53.5	3:29.97
2001	Clemson Tigers	Shekera Weston	50.9	3:29.97
2002	South Carolina Gamecocks	Tiffany Ross	53.0	3:26.46
2002	South Carolina Gamecocks	Demetria Washington	50.4	3:26.46
2002	South Carolina Gamecocks	Tacita Bass	52.6	3:26.46
2002	South Carolina Gamecocks	Leshinda Demus	50.5	3:26.46
2003	Texas Longhorns	Naleya Downer (JAM)	53.2	3:26.76
2003	Texas Longhorns	Moushaumi Robinson	51.4	3:26.76
2003	Texas Longhorns	Raasin McIntosh	51.0	3:26.76
2003	Texas Longhorns	Sanya Richards	51.2	3:26.76
2004	LSU Lady Tigers	Neisha Bernard-Thomas (GRN)	52.3	3:25.26
2004	LSU Lady Tigers	HazelAnn Regis (GRN)	51.9	3:25.26
2004	LSU Lady Tigers	Monique Hall	50.8	3:25.26
2004	LSU Lady Tigers	Nadia Davy	50.3	3:25.26
2005	Texas Longhorns	Sheretta Jones	53.5	3:27.13
2005	Texas Longhorns	Melaine Walker (JAM)	51.5	3:27.13
2005	Texas Longhorns	LaTashia Kerr	51.0	3:27.13
2005	Texas Longhorns	Jerrika Chapple	51.1	3:27.13
2006	LSU Lady Tigers	Brooklynn Morris	51.7	3:25.78
2006	LSU Lady Tigers	Meisue Francis (GRN)	52.0	3:25.78
2006	LSU Lady Tigers	Cynetheia Rooks	51.5	3:25.78
2006	LSU Lady Tigers	Deonna Lawrence	50.6	3:25.78
2007	LSU Lady Tigers	Nickiesha Wilson (JAM)	53.6	3:28.07
2007	LSU Lady Tigers	Cynetheia Rooks	51.5	3:28.07
2007	LSU Lady Tigers	LaTavia Thomas	51.85	3:28.07
2007	LSU Lady Tigers	Deonna Lawrence	51.09	3:28.07
2008	Penn State Nittany Lions	Dominique Blake	52.9	3:27.69
2008	Penn State Nittany Lions	Aleesha Barber	51.8	3:27.69
2008	Penn State Nittany Lions	Gayle Hunter	52.48	3:27.69
2008	Penn State Nittany Lions	Shana Cox	50.45	3:27.69
2009	Texas Longhorns	Judy Nwosu	53.4	3:28.51
2009	Texas Longhorns	Angele Cooper	52.0	3:28.51
2009	Texas Longhorns	Alexandria Anderson	50.93	3:28.51
2009	Texas Longhorns	Chantel Malone	52.13	3:28.51
2010	Oregon Ducks	Brianne Theisen (CAN)	53.7	3:28.41
2010	Oregon Ducks	Amber Purvis	51.4	3:28.41
2010	Oregon Ducks	Michele Williams	52.84	3:28.41
2010	Oregon Ducks	Keshia Baker	50.59	3:28.41
2011	Texas A&M Aggies	Jeneba Tarmoh	53.5	3:26.31
2011	Texas A&M Aggies	Ibukun Mayungbe (NGR)	51.4	3:26.31
2011	Texas A&M Aggies	Andrea Sutherland (JAM)	52.30	3:26.31
2011	Texas A&M Aggies	Jessica Beard	49.13	3:26.31
2012	Oregon Ducks	English Gardner	51.1	3:24.54
2012	Oregon Ducks	Chizoba Okodogbe (NGR)	51.4	3:24.54
2012	Oregon Ducks	Laura Roesler	51.86	3:24.54
2012	Oregon Ducks	Phyllis Francis	50.15	3:24.54
2013	Arkansas Razorbacks	Chrishuna Williams	53.3	3:27.09
2013	Arkansas Razorbacks	Sparkle McKnight (TTO)	50.9	3:27.09
2013	Arkansas Razorbacks	Gwendolyn Flowers	52.40	3:27.09
2013	Arkansas Razorbacks	Regina George (NGR)	50.48	3:27.09
2014	Texas Longhorns	Briana Nelson	52.8	3:24.21
2014	Texas Longhorns	Kendall Baisden	50.5	3:24.21
2014	Texas Longhorns	Morolake Akinosun	51.37	3:24.21
2014	Texas Longhorns	Courtney Okolo	49.57	3:24.21
2015	Florida Gators	Robin Reynolds	52.6	3:28.12
2015	Florida Gators	Kyra Jefferson	51.7	3:28.12
2015	Florida Gators	Destinee Gause	51.91	3:28.12
2015	Florida Gators	Claudia Francis	51.89	3:28.12
2016	Texas Longhorns	Chrisann Gordon (JAM)	52.0	3:27.64
2016	Texas Longhorns	Morolake Akinosun	53.1	3:27.64
2016	Texas Longhorns	Zola Golden	52.13	3:27.64
2016	Texas Longhorns	Courtney Okolo	50.45	3:27.64
2017	Oregon Ducks	Makenzie Dunmore	51.7	3:23.13
2017	Oregon Ducks	Deajah Stevens	50.8	3:23.13
2017	Oregon Ducks	Elexis Guster	50.80	3:23.13
2017	Oregon Ducks	Raevyn Rogers	49.77	3:23.13
2018	USC Trojans	Kyra Constantine (CAN)	53.0	3:27.06
2018	USC Trojans	Anna Cockrell	51.3	3:27.06
2018	USC Trojans	Deanna Hill	52.72	3:27.06
2018	USC Trojans	Kendall Ellis	50.05	3:27.06
2019	Texas A&M Aggies	Tierra Robinson-Jones	52.3	3:25.57
2019	Texas A&M Aggies	Jaevin Reed	51.1	3:25.57
2019	Texas A&M Aggies	Jazmine Fray (JAM)	51.38	3:25.57
2019	Texas A&M Aggies	Syaira Richardson	50.83	3:25.57
2021	Texas A&M Aggies	Tierra Robinson-Jones	51.9	3:22.34
2021	Texas A&M Aggies	Charokee Young	49.7	3:22.34
2021	Texas A&M Aggies	Jaevin Reed	51.86	3:22.34
2021	Texas A&M Aggies	Athing Mu	48.84	3:22.34
2022	Kentucky Wildcats	Karimah Davis	51.5	3:22.55
2022	Kentucky Wildcats	Dajour Miles	51.9	3:22.55
2022	Kentucky Wildcats	Abby Steiner	48.92	3:22.55
2022	Kentucky Wildcats	Alexis Holmes	50.21	3:22.55
2023	Arkansas Razorbacks	Paris Peoples	51.8	3:24.05
2023	Arkansas Razorbacks	Joanne Reid (JAM)	51.2	3:24.05
2023	Arkansas Razorbacks	Nickisha Pryce (JAM)	50.33	3:24.05
2023	Arkansas Razorbacks	Rosey Effiong	50.73	3:24.05
2024	Arkansas Razorbacks	Amber Anning (GBR)	50.52	3:17.96
2024	Arkansas Razorbacks	Rosey Effiong	49.21	3:17.96
2024	Arkansas Razorbacks	Nickisha Pryce (JAM)	49.20	3:17.96
2024	Arkansas Razorbacks	Kaylyn Brown	49.05	3:17.96
2025	Georgia Bulldogs	Dejanea Oakley (JAM)	51.12	3:23.62
2025	Georgia Bulldogs	Michelle Smith (VIR)	51.88	3:23.62
2025	Georgia Bulldogs	Sydney Harris	51.85	3:23.62
2025	Georgia Bulldogs	Aaliyah Butler	48.79	3:23.62
2026	Arkansas Razorbacks	Sanaria Butler	50.65	3:18.88
2026	Arkansas Razorbacks	Analisse Batista	49.93	3:18.88
2026	Arkansas Razorbacks	Kaylyn Brown	49.29	3:18.88
2026	Arkansas Razorbacks	Sanu Jallow (GAM)	49.02	3:18.88

Men's winners
Year	School	Athlete	Split	Time
1942 (Note: Not part of team scoring)	Midwest	Leroy Collins	—N/a	3:16.5
1942	Midwest	Bob Ufer	—N/a	3:16.5
1942	Midwest	Russell Owen	—N/a	3:16.5
1942	Midwest	Bill Lyda	—N/a	3:16.5
1947 (Note: Not part of team scoring)	South	Tom Dickey	—N/a	3:13.8yA
1947	South	Ray Holbrook	—N/a	3:13.8yA
1947	South	Art Harnden	—N/a	3:13.8yA
1947	South	Dave Bolen	—N/a	3:13.8yA
1964	California Golden Bears	Al Courchesne	48.6y	3:07.4y
1964	California Golden Bears	Dave Fishback	47.4y	3:07.4y
1964	California Golden Bears	Forrest Beaty	45.6y	3:07.4y
1964	California Golden Bears	Dave Archibald	45.8y	3:07.4y
1965	California Golden Bears	Chuck Glenn	48.4y	3:07.5y
1965	California Golden Bears	Dave Fishback	46.8y	3:07.5y
1965	California Golden Bears	Forrest Beaty	45.7y	3:07.5y
1965	California Golden Bears	Dave Archibald	46.6y	3:07.5y
1966	UCLA Bruins	Gene Gail	48.1y	3:07.5y
1966	UCLA Bruins	Don Domansky (CAN)	47.1y	3:07.5y
1966	UCLA Bruins	Ron Copeland	46.7y	3:07.5y
1966	UCLA Bruins	Bob Frey	45.6y	3:07.5y
1967	Iowa Hawkeyes	Fred Ferree	47.4y	3:06.8yA
1967	Iowa Hawkeyes	Carl Frazier	46.8y	3:06.8yA
1967	Iowa Hawkeyes	Jon Reimer	46.4y	3:06.8yA
1967	Iowa Hawkeyes	Mike Mondane	46.2y	3:06.8yA
1968	Villanova Wildcats	Hardge Davis	47.6y	3:08.6y
1968	Villanova Wildcats	Ken Prince	47.8y	3:08.6y
1968	Villanova Wildcats	Hal Nichter	47.4y	3:08.6y
1968	Villanova Wildcats	Larry James	45.3y	3:08.6y
1969	UCLA Bruins	John Smith	47.0y	3:03.4y AR
1969	UCLA Bruins	Len Van Howegen	45.0y	3:03.4y AR
1969	UCLA Bruins	Andy Young	46.4y	3:03.4y AR
1969	UCLA Bruins	Wayne Collett	45.0y	3:03.4y AR
1970	UCLA Bruins	Bob Langston	48.2y	3:06.1y
1970	UCLA Bruins	John Smith	45.6y	3:06.1y
1970	UCLA Bruins	Brad Lyman	47.5y	3:06.1y
1970	UCLA Bruins	Wayne Collett	44.8y	3:06.1y
1971	UCLA Bruins	Warren Edmonson	46.9y	3:04.4y
1971	UCLA Bruins	Reggie Echols	47.2y	3:04.4y
1971	UCLA Bruins	John Smith	45.1y	3:04.4y
1971	UCLA Bruins	Wayne Collett	45.2y	3:04.4y
1972	UCLA Bruins	Reggie Echols	47.1y	3:05.4y
1972	UCLA Bruins	Ron Gaddis	46.7y	3:05.4y
1972	UCLA Bruins	Benny Brown	46.5y	3:05.4y
1972	UCLA Bruins	John Smith	45.0y	3:05.4y
1973	UCLA Bruins	Ron Gaddis	46.7y	3:04.3y
1973	UCLA Bruins	Gordon Peppars	46.9y	3:04.3y
1973	UCLA Bruins	Maxie Parks	45.9y	3:04.3y
1973	UCLA Bruins	Benny Brown	44.8y	3:04.3y
1974	UCLA Bruins	Lynnsey Guerrero	48.0y	3:06.63y
1974	UCLA Bruins	Benny Brown	45.4y	3:06.63y
1974	UCLA Bruins	Jerome Walters Jr.	47.9y	3:06.63y
1974	UCLA Bruins	Maxie Parks	45.3y	3:06.63y
1975	Washington Huskies	Keith Tinner	46.7y	3:05.10y A
1975	Washington Huskies	Jerry Belur	47.4y	3:05.10y A
1975	Washington Huskies	Pablo Franco	45.1y	3:05.10y A
1975	Washington Huskies	Billy Hicks	45.9y	3:05.10y A
1976	Arizona State Sun Devils	Clifton McKenzie	45.7	3:03.49
1976	Arizona State Sun Devils	Rick Walker	47.0	3:03.49
1976	Arizona State Sun Devils	Carl McCullough	45.2	3:03.49
1976	Arizona State Sun Devils	Herm Frazier	45.6	3:03.49
1977	USC Trojans	Joel Andrews	46.4	3:04.50
1977	USC Trojans	Lloyd Johnson	46.3	3:04.50
1977	USC Trojans	Rayfield Beaton (GUY)	46.3	3:04.50
1977	USC Trojans	Tom Andrews	45.5	3:04.50
1978	Villanova Wildcats	Keith Brown	46.5y	3:05.09y
1978	Villanova Wildcats	Anthony Tufariello	46.6y	3:05.09y
1978	Villanova Wildcats	Glenn Bogue (CAN)	45.8y	3:05.09y
1978	Villanova Wildcats	Tim Dale	46.2y	3:05.09y
1979	LSU Tigers	Pearson Jordan (BAR)	47.9	3:04.67
1979	LSU Tigers	Efrem Coley	46.0	3:04.67
1979	LSU Tigers	ReVey Scott	45.1	3:04.67
1979	LSU Tigers	Greg Hill	45.7	3:04.67
1980	Tennessee Volunteers	Alburtos Horne	46.9	3:03.94
1980	Tennessee Volunteers	Darryal Wilson	45.7	3:03.94
1980	Tennessee Volunteers	Lamar Preyor	46.3	3:03.94
1980	Tennessee Volunteers	Anthony Blair	45.1	3:03.94
1981	Tennessee Volunteers	Darryl Canady	47.7	3:03.08
1981	Tennessee Volunteers	Darryal Wilson	45.4	3:03.08
1981	Tennessee Volunteers	David Patrick	45.4	3:03.08
1981	Tennessee Volunteers	Anthony Blair	44.6	3:03.08
1982	Mississippi State Bulldogs	Mike Hadley	46.8	3:03.49A
1982	Mississippi State Bulldogs	George Washington	46.2	3:03.49A
1982	Mississippi State Bulldogs	Michael Moore	45.7	3:03.49A
1982	Mississippi State Bulldogs	Daryl Jones	44.8	3:03.49A
1983	TCU Horned Frogs	Allen Ingraham (BAH)	46.0	3:02.09
1983	TCU Horned Frogs	James Richard	45.5	3:02.09
1983	TCU Horned Frogs	Keith Burnett	45.0	3:02.09
1983	TCU Horned Frogs	David Walker	45.6	3:02.09
1984	Oklahoma Sooners	Aubrey Jones	47.0y	3:03.06y
1984	Oklahoma Sooners	Fonnie Kemp	45.8y	3:03.06y
1984	Oklahoma Sooners	Dannie Carter	45.0y	3:03.06y
1984	Oklahoma Sooners	Don Bly	45.3y	3:03.06y
1985	Baylor Bears	Darnell Chase	46.0	3:00.84
1985	Baylor Bears	Derwin Graham	45.8	3:00.84
1985	Baylor Bears	Johnny Thomas	44.8	3:00.84
1985	Baylor Bears	Willie Caldwell	44.3	3:00.84
1986	SMU Mustangs	Harold Spells	46.1	3:01.62
1986	SMU Mustangs	Rod Jones	45.4	3:01.62
1986	SMU Mustangs	Roy Martin	45.7	3:01.62
1986	SMU Mustangs	Kevin Robinzine	44.5	3:01.62
1987	UCLA Bruins	Anthony Washington	47.0	3:00.55
1987	UCLA Bruins	Kevin Young	44.7	3:00.55
1987	UCLA Bruins	Henry Thomas	44.0	3:00.55
1987	UCLA Bruins	Danny Everett	44.9	3:00.55
1988	UCLA Bruins	Steve Lewis	45.0	2:59.91
1988	UCLA Bruins	Kevin Young	44.4	2:59.91
1988	UCLA Bruins	Danny Everett	45.3	2:59.91
1988	UCLA Bruins	Henry Thomas	45.2	2:59.91
1989	Texas A&M Aggies	Stanley Kerr	45.4	3:00.91A
1989	Texas A&M Aggies	Errington Lindo (JAM)	45.8	3:00.91A
1989	Texas A&M Aggies	Derrick Florence	45.0	3:00.91A
1989	Texas A&M Aggies	Howard Davis (JAM)	44.7	3:00.91A
1990	Baylor Bears	Daniel Fredericks	46.6	3:01.86
1990	Baylor Bears	Todd Thompson	45.6	3:01.86
1990	Baylor Bears	Tony Miller	46.0	3:01.86
1990	Baylor Bears	Michael Johnson	43.7	3:01.86
1991	Baylor Bears	Daniel Fredericks	46.1	3:02.52
1991	Baylor Bears	Lester Crenshaw	45.0	3:02.52
1991	Baylor Bears	Ethridge Green	46.1	3:02.52
1991	Baylor Bears	Corey Williams	45.3	3:02.52
1992	Georgia Tech Yellow Jackets	Octavius Terry	45.6	2:59.95
1992	Georgia Tech Yellow Jackets	Julian Amedee	45.5	2:59.95
1992	Georgia Tech Yellow Jackets	Derrick Adkins	45.0	2:59.95
1992	Georgia Tech Yellow Jackets	Derek Mills	43.9	2:59.95
1993	Ohio State Buckeyes	Rich Jones (GUY)	46.2	3:00.82
1993	Ohio State Buckeyes	Aaron Payne	45.0	3:00.82
1993	Ohio State Buckeyes	Robert Smith	45.4	3:00.82
1993	Ohio State Buckeyes	Chris Nelloms	44.2	3:00.82
1994	Georgia Tech Yellow Jackets	Octavius Terry	46.0	3:01.75
1994	Georgia Tech Yellow Jackets	Jonas Motiejunas	45.5	3:01.75
1994	Georgia Tech Yellow Jackets	Conrad Nichols	45.2	3:01.75
1994	Georgia Tech Yellow Jackets	Derek Mills	45.1	3:01.75
1995	Baylor Bears	Michael Ford	46.4	3:01.57
1995	Baylor Bears	Raoul Howard	45.2	3:01.57
1995	Baylor Bears	Corey Williams	45.3	3:01.57
1995	Baylor Bears	Deon Minor	44.7	3:01.57
1996	Baylor Bears	Michael Ford	46.2	3:01.25
1996	Baylor Bears	Raoul Howard	45.3	3:01.25
1996	Baylor Bears	Darrin Strong	45.1	3:01.25
1996	Baylor Bears	Marlon Ramsey	44.7	3:01.25
1997	Oklahoma Sooners	Edward Clarke (JAM)	45.6	3:01.25
1997	Oklahoma Sooners	Danny McFarlane (JAM)	45.6	3:01.25
1997	Oklahoma Sooners	Ryan Kite	45.14	3:01.25
1997	Oklahoma Sooners	Roxbert Martin (JAM)	44.91	3:01.25
1998	Georgia Tech Yellow Jackets	Tomas Motiejunas	46.8	3:01.89
1998	Georgia Tech Yellow Jackets	Michael Johnson	45.9	3:01.89
1998	Georgia Tech Yellow Jackets	Jonas Motiejunas	45.6	3:01.89
1998	Georgia Tech Yellow Jackets	Angelo Taylor	43.6	3:01.89
1999	UCLA Bruins	Michael Granville	46.5	3:02.12
1999	UCLA Bruins	Terrence Williams	44.8	3:02.12
1999	UCLA Bruins	Malachi Davis	45.6	3:02.12
1999	UCLA Bruins	Brian Fell	45.2	3:02.12
2000	Baylor Bears	Zsolt Szeglet (HUN)	46.3	3:01.45
2000	Baylor Bears	Bayano Kamani (PAN)	45.4	3:01.45
2000	Baylor Bears	Floyd Thompson	45.1	3:01.45
2000	Baylor Bears	Brandon Couts	44.7	3:01.45
2001	Baylor Bears	Zsolt Szeglet (HUN)	46.5	3:03.89
2001	Baylor Bears	Bayano Kamani (PAN)	45.8	3:03.89
2001	Baylor Bears	Floyd Thompson	46.3	3:03.89
2001	Baylor Bears	Brandon Couts	45.3	3:03.89
2002	South Carolina Gamecocks	James Law	46.0	3:02.16
2002	South Carolina Gamecocks	Otukile Lekote (BOT)	46.0	3:02.16
2002	South Carolina Gamecocks	Otis Harris	46.0	3:02.16
2002	South Carolina Gamecocks	Jonathan Fortenberry	44.4	3:02.16
2003	LSU Tigers	Robert Parham	46.4	3:02.01
2003	LSU Tigers	Bennie Brazell	45.9	3:02.01
2003	LSU Tigers	Pete Coley (JAM)	45.1	3:02.01
2003	LSU Tigers	Kelly Willie	44.6	3:02.01
2004	Baylor Bears	Wil Fitts	46.7	3:01.03
2004	Baylor Bears	Braelon Davis	46.0	3:01.03
2004	Baylor Bears	Jeremy Wariner	44.0	3:01.03
2004	Baylor Bears	Darold Williamson	44.3	3:01.03
2005	LSU Tigers	Reggie Dardar	46.4	2:59.59
2005	LSU Tigers	Kelly Willie	44.4	2:59.59
2005	LSU Tigers	Bennie Brazell	44.8	2:59.59
2005	LSU Tigers	Xavier Carter	44.0	2:59.59
2006	LSU Tigers	Reggie Dardar	45.8	3:01.58
2006	LSU Tigers	Kelly Willie	44.8	3:01.58
2006	LSU Tigers	Melville Rogers (SKN)	45.5	3:01.58
2006	LSU Tigers	Xavier Carter	45.5	3:01.58
2007	Baylor Bears	Reggie Witherspoon	45.6	3:00.04
2007	Baylor Bears	LeJerald Betters	44.4	3:00.04
2007	Baylor Bears	Kevin Mutai	45.18	3:00.04
2007	Baylor Bears	Quentin Summers	44.88	3:00.04
2008	Baylor Bears	Marcus Boyd	45.8	3:00.22
2008	Baylor Bears	Justin Boyd	45.5	3:00.22
2008	Baylor Bears	LeJerald Betters	44.37	3:00.22
2008	Baylor Bears	Quentin Iglehart-Summers	44.50	3:00.22
2009	Florida State Seminoles	Kevin Williams	46.6	2:59.99
2009	Florida State Seminoles	Kevin Borlée (BEL)	43.8	2:59.99
2009	Florida State Seminoles	Charles Clark	45.85	2:59.99
2009	Florida State Seminoles	Jonathan Borlée (BEL)	43.78	2:59.99
2010	Texas A&M Aggies	Bryan Miller	46.4	3:00.89
2010	Texas A&M Aggies	Demetrius Pinder (BAH)	44.6	3:00.89
2010	Texas A&M Aggies	Curtis Mitchell	45.07	3:00.89
2010	Texas A&M Aggies	Tabarie Henry (ISV)	44.79	3:00.89
2011	Texas A&M Aggies	Bryan Miller	45.5	3:00.62
2011	Texas A&M Aggies	Demetrius Pinder (BAH)	44.6	3:00.62
2011	Texas A&M Aggies	Michael Preble	45.60	3:00.62
2011	Texas A&M Aggies	Tabarie Henry (ISV)	44.86	3:00.62
2012	Florida Gators	Dedric Dukes	45.6	3:00.02
2012	Florida Gators	Hugh Graham	45.1	3:00.02
2012	Florida Gators	Leonardo Seymore	45.31	3:00.02
2012	Florida Gators	Tony McQuay	44.00	3:00.02
2013	Florida Gators	Najee Glass	46.0	3:01.34
2013	Florida Gators	Hugh Graham	45.4	3:01.34
2013	Florida Gators	Dedric Dukes	45.09	3:01.34
2013	Florida Gators	Arman Hall	44.86	3:01.34
2014	Texas A&M Aggies	Aldrich Bailey Jr.	46.5	2:59.60
2014	Texas A&M Aggies	Carlyle Roudette (TTO)	44.7	2:59.60
2014	Texas A&M Aggies	Bralon Taplin (GRN)	44.30	2:59.60
2014	Texas A&M Aggies	Deon Lendore (TTO)	44.10	2:59.60
2015	LSU Tigers	Quincy Downing	46.4	3:01.96
2015	LSU Tigers	Fitzroy Dunkley (JAM)	45.6	3:01.96
2015	LSU Tigers	Cyril Grayson	45.02	3:01.96
2015	LSU Tigers	Vernon Norwood	44.96	3:01.96
2016	LSU Tigers	Lamar Bruton	46.4	3:00.69
2016	LSU Tigers	Michael Cherry	44.2	3:00.69
2016	LSU Tigers	Cyril Grayson	45.80	3:00.69
2016	LSU Tigers	Fitzroy Dunkley (JAM)	44.29	3:00.69
2017	Texas A&M Aggies	Richard Rose	46.7	2:59.98
2017	Texas A&M Aggies	Mylik Kerley	44.2	2:59.98
2017	Texas A&M Aggies	Robert Grant	45.11	2:59.98
2017	Texas A&M Aggies	Fred Kerley	43.99	2:59.98
2018	USC Trojans	Ricky Morgan Jr.	45.9	2:59.00
2018	USC Trojans	Rai Benjamin (ANT)	43.6	2:59.00
2018	USC Trojans	Zachary Shinnick	45.85	2:59.00
2018	USC Trojans	Michael Norman	43.62	2:59.00
2019	Texas A&M Aggies	Bryce Deadmon	45.3	2:59.05
2019	Texas A&M Aggies	Robert Grant	44.4	2:59.05
2019	Texas A&M Aggies	DeWitt Thomas	45.24	2:59.05
2019	Texas A&M Aggies	Devin Dixon	44.11	2:59.05
2021	North Carolina A&T Aggies	Daniel Stokes (MEX)	47.1	3:00.92
2021	North Carolina A&T Aggies	Randolph Ross	43.8	3:00.92
2021	North Carolina A&T Aggies	Akeem Sirleaf (LBR)	45.89	3:00.92
2021	North Carolina A&T Aggies	Trevor Stewart	44.16	3:00.92
2022	Florida Gators	Jacory Patterson	44.8	2:58.88
2022	Florida Gators	Ryan Willie	44.2	2:58.88
2022	Florida Gators	Jacob Miley	45.85	2:58.88
2022	Florida Gators	Champion Allison	44.06	2:58.88
2023	Florida Gators	Emmanuel Bamidele (NER)	44.6	2:57.74
2023	Florida Gators	Jacory Patterson	43.9	2:57.74
2023	Florida Gators	JeVaughn Powell (JAM)	44.93	2:57.74
2023	Florida Gators	Ryan Willie	44.28	2:57.74
2024	Texas A&M Aggies	Jevon O'Bryant	45.69	2:57.74
2024	Texas A&M Aggies	Cutler Zamzow	45.11	2:57.74
2024	Texas A&M Aggies	Kimar Farquharson	44.38	2:57.74
2024	Texas A&M Aggies	Auhmad Robinson	43.20	2:57.74
2025	South Florida Bulls	Devontie Archer (JAM)	46.90	3:00.42
2025	South Florida Bulls	Alexavier Monfries (JAM)	44.11	3:00.42
2025	South Florida Bulls	Corey Ottey (JAM)	45.19	3:00.42
2025	South Florida Bulls	Gabriel Moronta	44.23	3:00.42
2026	Georgia Bulldogs	Xai Ricks	45.50	2:57.93
2026	Georgia Bulldogs	Sidi Njie	44.18	2:57.93
2026	Georgia Bulldogs	London Costen	45.28	2:57.93
2026	Georgia Bulldogs	Jonathan Simms	42.99	2:57.93
