= Nick Floyd =

Biographical details
- Education: Clemson University, University of Mississippi

Administrative career (AD unless noted)
- 1983–1985: Ole Miss (GA)
- 1986–1998: Southern Miss (assistant AD)
- 1998–2001: Conference USA (assoc. comm.)
- 2001–2003: East Carolina (assistant AD)
- 2003–2004: East Carolina (interim AD)
- 2004–2017: East Carolina (assistant AD)
- 2017–2018: Louisiana–Monroe

Nick Floyd is an American college athletics administrator. He was most recently the athletic director at the University of Louisiana at Monroe, a position he held from 2017 to 2018. Before that appointment, he served as an assistant athletic director for East Carolina University and the University of Southern Mississippi, as well as Associate Commissioner for Conference USA from 1998 to 2001. Floyd graduated from Clemson University with a bachelor's degree in 1982, and the University of Mississippi with a master's degree in 1985. Floyd was named athletic director at the University of Louisiana at Monroe on July 6, 2017. Floyd resigned his position as athletic director at the University of Louisiana at Monroe on August 20, 2018.
