= Whelchel =

Whelchel is a surname. Notable people with the surname include:

- B. Frank Whelchel (1895–1954), American politician
- Dan Whelchel (1894–1988), American football player
- Homer Whelchel (1899–1974), American athlete
- Hugh Whelchel (1900–1968), American football player
- John Whelchel (1898–1973), United States Navy officer, American football player, coach and athletics administrator
- Josh Whelchel (born 1987), American composer
- Kristy Whelchel (born 1977), American women's soccer player
- Lisa Whelchel (born 1963), American actor
- Susan Whelchel (1944–2022), American politician
