= Light Up (film) =

2024 film directed by Ryan Ashley Lowery

- Theatrical Poster
- Directed by: Ryan Ashley Lowery
- Produced by: Ryan Ashley Lowery; Kenisha Johnson
- Starring: Derek Jae; Simone Tisci; Octavius Terry; Obio Jones; Benjamin Carlton
- Cinematography: Nathan Walters; Ben Walters
- Edited by: Clinton Cornwell
- Music by: Mark Peter Royce
- Release date: August 25, 2024
- Running time: 91 minutes
- Country: United States
- Language: English

Light Up is a 2024 American documentary film directed by Ryan Ashley Lowery. The film centers on the lives of five African American LGBTQ+ individuals in Atlanta, showing how resilience, self-discovery, and community become anchors of strength. Light Up had its world premiere at Bronzelens Film Festival in 2024 and has been screened at multiple other film festivals across the United States.

== Synopsis ==
Through interviews, Light Up explores how each individual has navigated identity, visibility, and acceptance across both personal and professional spaces. Each story is rooted in vulnerability, resilience, and triumph, underscoring the broader theme of empowerment through authenticity.

== Cast ==
- Derek Jae
- Simone Tisci
- Octavius Terry
- Obio Jones
- Benjamin Carlton

== Critical reception ==
On Rotten Tomatoes, the film has an approval rating of 91% based on 11 reviews, with an average rating of 6/10.

André Hereford of Metro Weekly wrote that the film "offers a thoughtful, lived-in, multi-faceted view of being Black and LGBTQ in America and in the relative queer mecca of Atlanta."
