= Brian Irvin =

American sprinter

Personal information
- Born: July 30, 1970 (age 56)

Sport
- Sport: Track and field
Medal record
Representing United States
World Indoor Championships
Gold medal – first place	1993 Toronto	4x400 m relay
Summer Universiade
Gold medal – first place	1991 Sheffield	4x400 m relay

Brian Irvin (born July 30, 1970) is an American retired sprinter.

Irvin was a multiple-time All-American for the East Carolina Pirates track and field team. He was on the gold medal-winning 4 × 400 m team at the 1993 World Indoor Championships.
