= 1992 NCAA Division I Outdoor Track and Field Championships =

- Men's Champion: Arkansas (2nd title); Women's Champion: LSU (6th title)
- Edition: 71st (Men); 11th (Women)
- Dates: June 3−6, 1992
- Host city: Austin, Texas
- Venue: Texas Memorial Stadium; University of Texas at Austin

The 1992 NCAA Division I Outdoor Track and Field Championships were contested June 3−6, 1992 at Mike A. Myers Stadium at the University of Texas at Austin in Austin, Texas in order to determine the individual and team national champions of men's and women's collegiate Division I outdoor track and field events in the United States.

These were the 71st annual men's championships and the 11th annual women's championships. This was the Longhorns' fifth time hosting the event and the first since 1985 (the last and only other time Arkansas had won the men's title before 1992).

Arkansas and LSU topped the men's and women's team standings, respectively; it was the Razorbacks' second men's team title and the sixth for the Lady Tigers. This was Arkansas' first title since 1985 and was the first of eight consecutive titles for the Razorbacks. The Lady Tigers, meanwhile, captured their sixth consecutive title and, ultimately, the sixth of eleven straight titles they won between 1987 and 1997.

== Team results ==
- Note: Top 10 only
- (H) = Hosts
- Full results

=== Men's standings ===
Rank	Team	Points
1st place, gold medalist(s)	Arkansas	60
2nd place, silver medalist(s)	Tennessee	46 1/2
3rd place, bronze medalist(s)	USC	41
4	Oregon	39
5	UTEP	35
6	Ohio State	28
7	LSU	26
8	Georgia Tech; UCLA	23
10	Florida; Georgia	22

=== Women's standings ===
Rank	Team	Points
1st place, gold medalist(s)	LSU	87
2nd place, silver medalist(s)	Florida	81
3rd place, bronze medalist(s)	Nebraska	30
4	Stanford	28
5	Alabama	27
6	UNLV	25
7	BYU	23
8	George Mason	22
9	Tennessee; Texas (H); Wisconsin	21

== Individual champions ==
=== Men's ===
==== 100-meter ====
Olapade Adeniken, UTEP, 10.09

==== 200-meter ====
Olapade Adeniken, UTEP, 20.11

==== 400-meter ====
Quincy Watts, USC, 44.00

==== 800-meter ====
Jose Parrilla, Tennessee, 1:46.45

==== 1,500-meter ====
Steve Holman, Georgetown, 3:38.39

==== 3,000-meter Steeple Chase ====
Marc Davis, Arizona, 8:36.79

==== 5,000-meter ====
Jon Dennis, South Florida, 14:02.40

==== 10,000-meter ====
Sean Dollman, Western Kentucky, 29:49.50

==== 110-meter High Hurdles ====
Mark Crear, USC, 13.49

==== 400-meter Intermediate Hurdles ====
Dan Steele, Eastern Illinois, 49.79

==== 400-meter relay ====
LSU (Reggie Jones, Bryant Williams, Chris King, Jason Sanders), 38.70

==== 1,600-meter relay ====
Georgia Tech (Octavius Terry, Julian Amede, Derrick Adkins, Derek Mills), 2:59.95

==== High Jump ====
Darrin Plab, Southern Illinois, 2.34 metres (7.7 ft)

==== Pole Vault ====
Istvan Bagyula, George Mason, 5.80 metres (19.0 ft)

==== Long Jump ====
Erick Walder, Arkansas, 8.47 metres (27.8 ft)

==== Triple Jump ====
Brian Wellman, Arkansas, 17.30 metres (56.8 ft) (w)

==== Shot Put ====
Brent Noon, Georgia, 19.98 metres (65.6 ft)

==== Discus ====
Kamy Keshmiri, Nevada, 67.06 metres (220.0 ft)

==== Hammer Throw ====
Mika Laaksonen, UTEP, 71.30 metres (233.9 ft)

==== Javelin ====
Art Skipper, Oregon, 75.78 metres (248.6 ft)

==== Decathlon ====
Brian Brophy, Tennessee, 8,276

=== Women's ===
==== 100-meter ====
Chryste Gaines, Stanford, 11.05 (w)

==== 200-meter ====
Dahlia Duhaney, LSU, 22.80

==== 400-meter ====
Anita Howard, Florida, 51.01

==== 800-meter ====
Nekita Beasley, Florida, 2:03.04

==== 1,500-meter ====
Sue Gentes, Wisconsin, 4:16.38

==== 3,000-meter ====
Nnenna Lynch, Villanova, 9:24.59

==== 5,000-meter ====
Monique Ecker, Oklahoma, 16:18.72

==== 10,000-meter ====
Kim Saddic, George Mason, 34:39.92

==== 110-meter High Hurdles ====
Michelle Freeman, Florida, 12.90

==== 400-meter Intermediate Hurdles ====
Tonja Buford, Illinois, 55.12

==== 400-meter relay ====
LSU (Dawn Bowles, Cheryl Taplin, Cinnamon Sheffield, Dahlia Duhaney), 43.03

==== 1,600-meter relay ====
Florida (Nekita Beasley, Michelle Freeman, Kim Mitchell, Anita Howard), 3:27.53

==== High Jump ====
Tanya Hughes, Arizona, 1.87 metres (6.1 ft)

==== Long Jump ====
Jackie Edwards, Stanford, 6.59 metres (21.6 ft)

==== Triple Jump ====
Leah Kirklin, Florida, 13.43 metres (44.1 ft)

==== Shot Put ====
Katrin Koch, Indiana, 17.53 metres (57.5 ft)

==== Discus ====
Anna Mosdell, BYU, 54.78 metres (179.7 ft)

==== Javelin ====
Valerie Tulloch, Rice, 58.26 metres (191.1 ft)

==== Heptathlon ====
Anu Kaljurand, BYU, 6,142
