= Jonas Motiejūnas =

Lithuanian sprinter (born 1974)

Personal information
- Nationality: Lithuanian
- Born: 7 December 1974 (age 51)

Sport
- Sport: Sprinting
- Event: 400 metres

Jonas Motiejūnas (born 7 December 1974) is a Lithuanian sprinter. He competed in the men's 400 metres at the 2000 Summer Olympics.

Running for the Georgia Tech Yellow Jackets track and field team, Motejunas won the 1994 and 1998 4 × 400 meter relay at the NCAA Division I Outdoor Track and Field Championships.
