= Williams Arena at Minges Coliseum =

Arena in North Carolina, USA

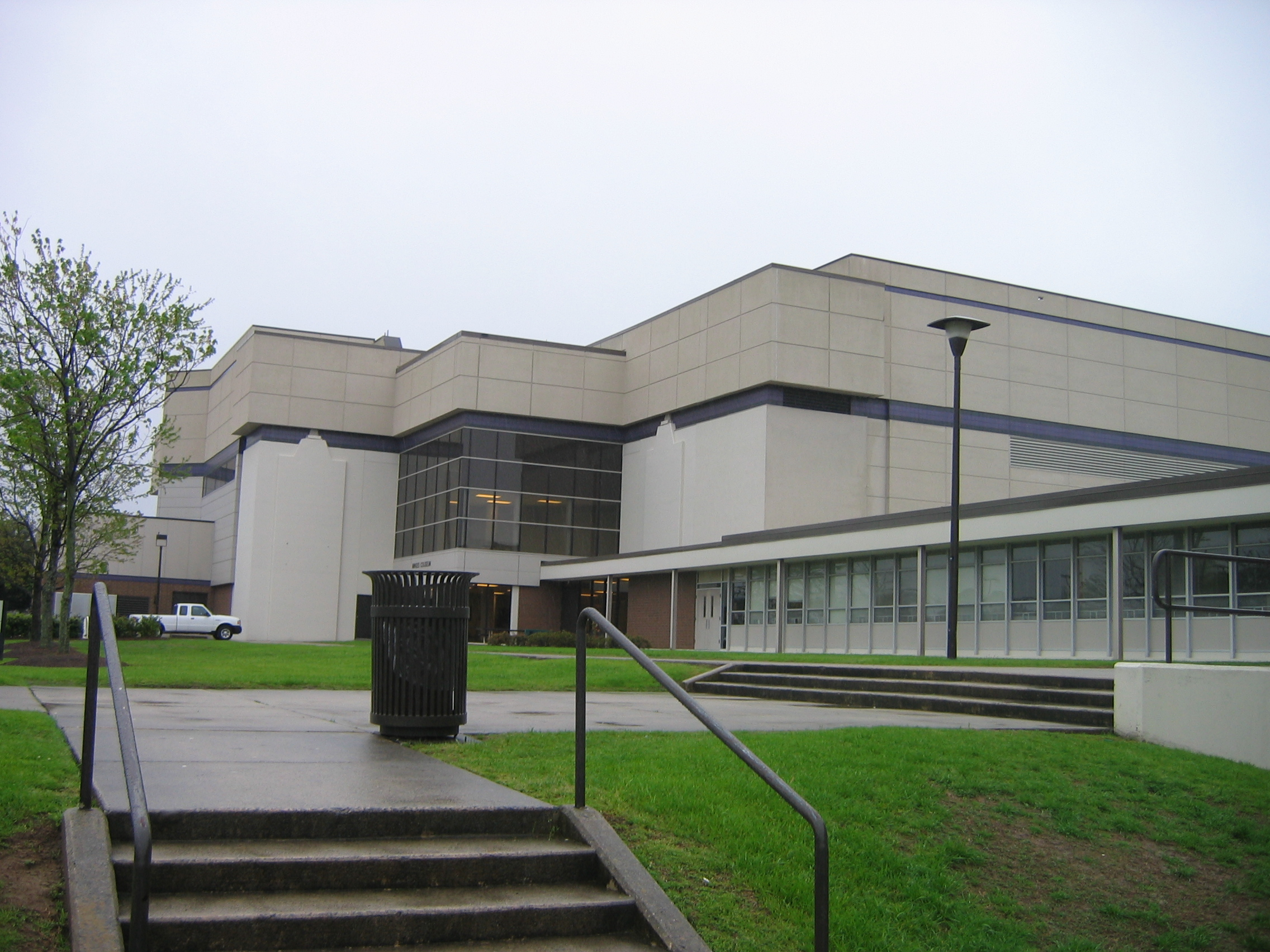
- Interactive map of Williams Arena at Minges Coliseum
- Location: 1 Ficklen Drive; Greenville, NC 27858
- Coordinates: 35.597391°N 77.367167°W
- Owner: East Carolina University
- Operator: East Carolina University
- Capacity: 8,000

Construction
- Groundbreaking: 1966
- Opened: January 27, 1968
- Renovated: 1994
- Cost: $2,467,671.66 ($22.8 million in 2025 dollars)
- Architects: F. Carter Williams; Corley Redfoot Architects (renovations 1993 to present)
- Structural engineers: Kahn & Furbush
- General contractors: Dickinson, Inc.

Tenant
- East Carolina University Athletics

Williams Arena at Minges Coliseum is a multi-purpose arena in Greenville, North Carolina, United States. The arena opened in 1968. It is home to the East Carolina University Pirates men's and women's basketball teams and women's volleyball team. The facility underwent a complete renovation prior to the 1994–95 season and seats 8,000 people. The building was named for the Minges and Williams families in honor of their longstanding support of the University.

== See also ==
- List of NCAA Division I basketball arenas
