= 1998 NCAA Division I Outdoor Track and Field Championships =

- Men's Champion: Arkansas (8th title); Women's Champion: Texas (2nd title)
- Edition: 77th Men; 17th Women
- Dates: June 3−6, 1998
- Host city: Buffalo, New York (New York (state))
- Venue: University at Buffalo Stadium; University at Buffalo
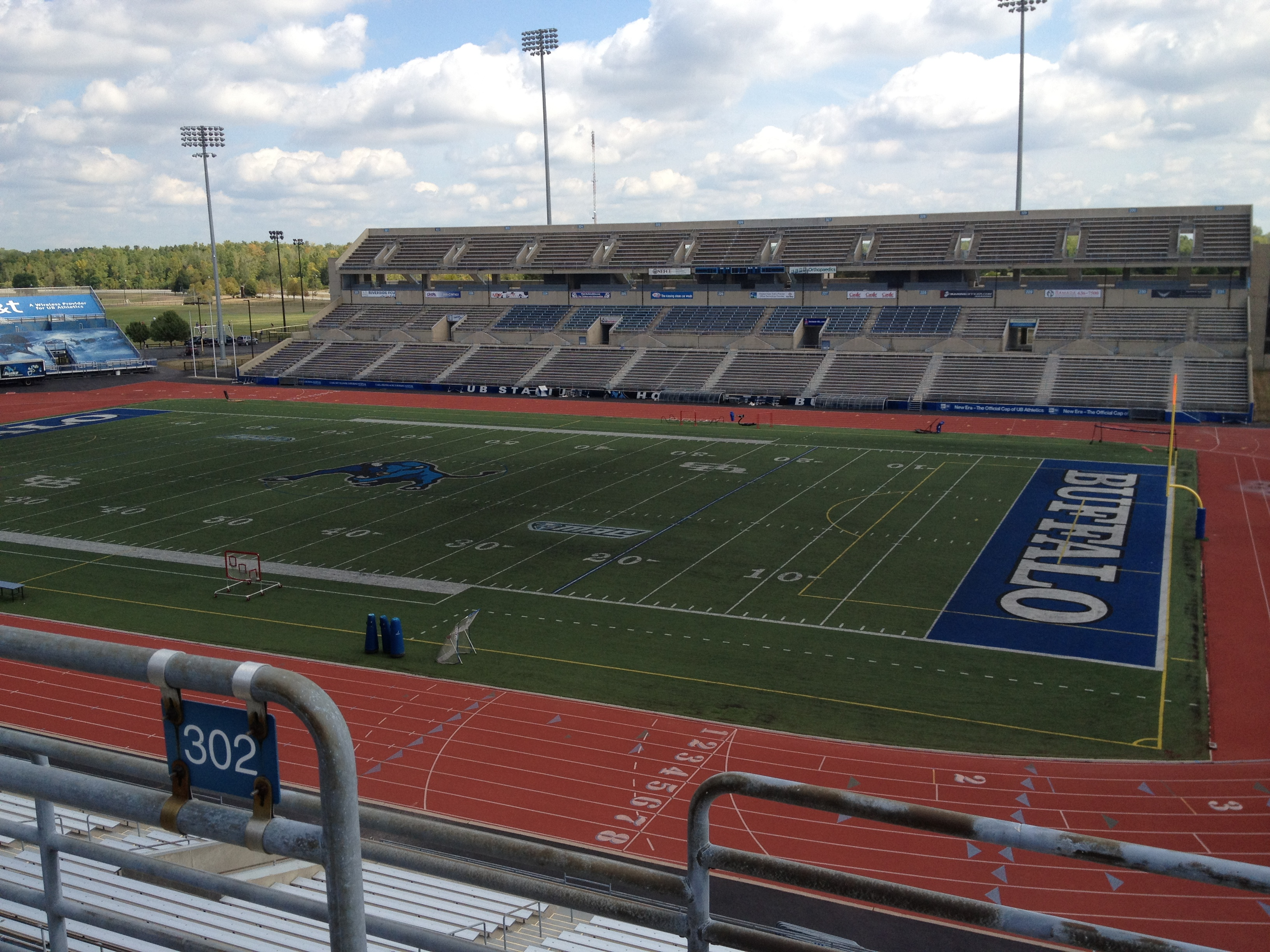
- Level: Collegiate Division I
- Type: Outdoor

The 1998 NCAA Division I Outdoor Track and Field Championships were contested June 3−6 at University at Buffalo Stadium at the University at Buffalo in Buffalo, New York in order to determine the individual and team national champions of men's and women's collegiate Division I outdoor track and field events in the United States.

These were the 77th annual men's championships and the 17th annual women's championships. This was the Bulls' first time hosting the event.

For the seventh consecutive year, Arkansas topped the men's team standings, finishing seven and a half points ahead of Stanford. It was the seventh of eight consecutive titles for the Razorbacks and their eighth overall.

Texas finished atop the women's team standings for the first time since 1986, claiming their second title in program history. This was the first title since 1986 not claimed by LSU, snapping their streak of eleven straight national titles. The 1986 championship was also the last event hosted by Indiana.

== Team results ==
- Note: Top 10 only
- (H) = Hosts
- Full results

=== Men's standings ===
Rank	Team	Points
1st place, gold medalist(s)	Arkansas	58 1/2
2nd place, silver medalist(s)	Stanford	51
3rd place, bronze medalist(s)	TCU (Vacated)	−
4	Arizona; LSU	41
6	UCLA	38
7	USC	29
8	Georgia Tech	28
9	SMU	26
10	Kansas State	25

=== Women's standings ===
Rank	Team	Points
1st place, gold medalist(s)	Texas	60
2nd place, silver medalist(s)	UCLA	55
3rd place, bronze medalist(s)	BYU; SMU	45
5	USC	35
6	Georgia	32
7	South Carolina	29 1/2
8	Nebraska	26
9	Stanford	25 1/2
10	Baylor	25

== Men's results ==
=== 100 meters ===
100 Meters Final Results
Rank	Name	University	Time
1st place, gold medalist(s)	Leonard Myles-Mills	Brigham Young	10.20
2nd place, silver medalist(s)	Jarmiene Holloway	Texas Christian University	10.24
3rd place, bronze medalist(s)	Ja'Warren Hooker	Washington Huskies	10.25
4	Percy Spencer	Texas Christian University	10.38
5	Kaaron Conwright	Cal Poly	10.40
6	Daymon Carroll	University of Florida	10.41
7	Ronnie Powell	Northwestern State University	10.53
8	Shawn Crawford	Clemson University	10.56

=== 200 meters ===
200 Meters Final Results
Rank	Name	University	Time
1st place, gold medalist(s)	Curtis Perry	LSU Tigers	20.40
2nd place, silver medalist(s)	Daymon Carroll	University of Florida	20.74
3rd place, bronze medalist(s)	Shawn Crawford	Clemson University	20.74
4	Charles Lee	University of South Carolina	20.81
5	Kaaron Conwright	Cal Poly	20.91
6	Trevor Rush	University of Arkansas	20.92
7	Syan Williams	Texas Christian University	21.13
8	Byron Logan	LSU Tigers	21.21

=== 400 meters ===
400 Meters Final Results
Rank	Name	University	Time
1st place, gold medalist(s)	Jerome Davis	USC Trojans	45.18
2nd place, silver medalist(s)	Davian Clarke	University of Miami	45.28
3rd place, bronze medalist(s)	Milton Campbell	University of North Carolina	45.76
4	Clement Chukwu	Eastern Michigan University	45.82
5	Brandon Couts	Baylor University	46.03
6	Dennis Darling	University of Houston	46.65
7	Randy Melbourne	Kansas State University	46.95
8	Derrick Ingram	East Carolina University	DQ

=== 800 meters ===
800 Meters Final Results
Rank	Name	University	Time
1st place, gold medalist(s)	Khadevis Robinson	TCU	1:46.04
2nd place, silver medalist(s)	David Krummenacker	Georgia Tech	1:46.40
3rd place, bronze medalist(s)	Robin Martin	University of Pennsylvania	1:47.10
4	Derrick Peterson	University of Missouri	1:47.14
5	Jess Strutzel	UCLA	1:47.15
6	Trinity Gray	Brown University	1:47.27
7	Patrick Nduwimana	University of Arizona	1:47.69
8	Bobby True	University of Illinois	1:47.80

=== 1500 meters ===
1500 Meters Final Results
Rank	Name	University	Time
1st place, gold medalist(s)	Seneca Lassiter	Arkansas Razorbacks	3:42.34
2nd place, silver medalist(s)	Gabe Jennings	Stanford University	3:42.39
3rd place, bronze medalist(s)	Bryan Berryhill	Colorado State University	3:42.66
4	Daniel Kinyua	Mount St. Mary's University	3:43.91
5	Jeremy Huffman	Arkansas Razorbacks	3:45.47
6	Jesus Ortega	Virginia Commonwealth University	3:46.37
7	Clyde Colenso	Southern Methodist University	3:46.47
8	Bernard Lagat	Washington State Cougars	3:46.88

=== 3000 meters steeplechase ===
3000 Meters Steeplechase Final Results
Rank	Name	University	Time
1st place, gold medalist(s)	Matt Kerr	Arkansas Razorbacks	8:36.95
2nd place, silver medalist(s)	John Mortimer	University of Michigan	8:40.42
3rd place, bronze medalist(s)	Adam Batliner	University of Colorado	8:40.87
4	Micah Davis	University of Oregon	8:41.95
5	Bryan Bothwell	Portland University	8:42.13
6	Chuck Sloan	Florida International University	8:43.33
7	James Carter	Hampton University	8:45.00
8	Miguel Galeana	University of Montana	8:45.20

=== 5000 meters ===
5000 Meters Final Results
Rank	Name	University	Time
1st place, gold medalist(s)	Adam Goucher	University of Colorado Boulder	13:31.64
2nd place, silver medalist(s)	Adbi Abdirahman	University of Arizona	13:40.61
3rd place, bronze medalist(s)	Mike Power	Arkansas Razorbacks	13:41.63
4	Mebrahtom Keflezighi	UCLA Bruins	13:44.68
5	Brad Hauser	Stanford	13:45.93
6	Christopher Graff	St. John's	13:46.39
7	John Mortimer	University of Michigan	13:48.91
8	Jeff Simonich	University of Utah	13:49.94

=== 10,000 meters ===
10,000 Meters Final Results
Rank	Name	University	Time
1st place, gold medalist(s)	Brad Hauser	Stanford	28:31.30
2nd place, silver medalist(s)	Brent Hauser	Stanford	28:32.39
3rd place, bronze medalist(s)	Nathan Nutter	Stanford	28:32.62
4	Mebrahtom Keflezighi	UCLA	28:39.58
5	Karl Rasmussen	Boston University	28:40.43
6	Adbi Abdirahman	University of Arizona	28:46.36
7	Pat Joyce	North Carolina State University	28:46.54
8	Sean Kaley	Arkansas Razorbacks	29:03.31

=== 110 meters hurdles ===
110 Meters Hurdles Final Results
Rank	Name	University	Time
1st place, gold medalist(s)	Larry Wade	Texas A&M University	13.37
2nd place, silver medalist(s)	Terrence Trammell	University of South Carolina	13.41
3rd place, bronze medalist(s)	Errol Williams	Notre Dame	13.53
4	Jeremichael Williams	Clemson University	13.76
5	William Erese	University of Southern California	13.77
6	John McAfee	Baylor University	13.79
7	Greg Hines	Clemson University	13.80
8	Kareem Archer	Villanova University	13.85

=== 400 meters hurdles ===
400 Meters Hurdles Final Results
Rank	Name	University	Time
1st place, gold medalist(s)	Angelo Taylor	Georgia Tech	48.14
2nd place, silver medalist(s)	Omar Brown	University of Oklahoma	49.38
3rd place, bronze medalist(s)	Kareem Archer	Villanova University	49.46
4	Cory Murdock	University of Utah	49.81
5	Greg Hines	Clemson University	50.46
6	Rod Davis	Florida International University	52.20
7	James Carter	Hampton University	1:07.62
—	Bayano Kamani	Baylor University	DNF

=== 4x100-meter relay ===
4x100-Meter Relay Final Results
Rank	University	Time
1st place, gold medalist(s)	Texas Christian University	38.04
2nd place, silver medalist(s)	Louisiana State University	38.24
3rd place, bronze medalist(s)	Fresno State University	38.94
4	UCLA	38.96
5	Clemson Tigers	39.07
6	University of South Carolina	39.08
7	Norfolk	39.61
8	Florida Gators	39.61

=== 4x400-meter relay ===
4x400-Meter Relay Final Results
Rank	University	Time
1st place, gold medalist(s)	Georgia Tech	3:01.89
2nd place, silver medalist(s)	Texas Christian University	3:03.00
3rd place, bronze medalist(s)	Florida A&M	3:04.24
4	Kansas State University	3:05.31
5	Baylor University	3:05.85
6	Florida	3:06.39
7	University of Texas	3:06.54
8	University of Louisiana	3:17.14

=== High Jump ===
High Jump Final Results
Rank	Name	University	Height
1st place, gold medalist(s)	Nathan Leeper	Kansas State University	2.28 m (7 ft 5 3/4 in)
2nd place, silver medalist(s)	Jeremy Fischer	University of Wisconsin	2.25 m (7 ft 4 1/2 in)
3rd place, bronze medalist(s)	Staffan Strand	University of Minnesota	2.25 m (7 ft 4 1/2 in)
4	Kenny Evans	Arkansas Razorbacks	2.22 m (7 ft 3 1/4 in)
5	Shane Lavy	University of Nebraska–Lincoln	2.22 m (7 ft 3 1/4 in)
6	James Nieto	Eastern Michigan University	2.22 m (7 ft 3 1/4 in)
7	Tora Harris	Princeton	2.19 m (7 ft 2 in)
8	Mustapha Raifak	Southern Methodist University	2.19 m (7 ft 2 in)

=== Pole Vault ===
Pole Vault Final Results
Rank	Name	University	Distance
1st place, gold medalist(s)	Toby Stevenson	Stanford	5.55 m (18 ft 2 1/2 in)
2nd place, silver medalist(s)	Borya Celentano	Long Beach	5.55 m (18 ft 2 1/2 in)
3rd place, bronze medalist(s)	Scott Slover	UCLA	5.45 m (17 ft 10 1/2 in)
4	Jason Hinkin	Long Beach	5.45 m (17 ft 10 1/2 in)
5	Russ Johnson	University of Tennessee	5.45 m (17 ft 10 1/2 in)
6	Jacob Davis	University of Texas	5.45 m (17 ft 10 1/2 in)
7	Piotr Buciarski	University of Oregon	5.30 m (17 ft 4 1/2 in)
8	Tye Harvey	University of Minnesota	5.30 m (17 ft 4 1/2 in)

=== Long Jump ===
Long Jump Final Results
Rank	Name	University	Distance	Wind
1st place, gold medalist(s)	Robert Howard	Arkansas Razorbacks	8.37 m (27 ft 5 1/2 in)	+2.7
2nd place, silver medalist(s)	Chris Wright	University of Nebraska–Lincoln	8.19 m (26 ft 10 1/4 in)	+5.9
3rd place, bronze medalist(s)	Bashir Yamini	University of Iowa	7.85 m (25 ft 9 in)	+5.5
4	George Audu	Penn State	7.83 m (25 ft 8 1/4 in)	+4.2
5	Stephen Pina	University of Florida	7.73 m (25 ft 4 1/4 in)	+4.7
6	John Gorham	Penn State	7.71 m (25 ft 3 1/2 in)	+3.0
7	Joe Knuffman	University of Illinois	7.71 m (25 ft 3 1/2 in)	+4.4
8	Chris Stafford	DePaul University	7.63 m (25 ft 1/4 in)	+4.2

=== Triple Jump ===
Triple Jump Final Results
Rank	Name	University	Distance	Wind
1st place, gold medalist(s)	Robert Howard	Arkansas Razorbacks	16.97 m (55 ft 8 in)	-0.6
2nd place, silver medalist(s)	Levar Anderson	Louisiana State University	16.46 m (54 ft 0 in)	+4.1
3rd place, bronze medalist(s)	Chris Kwaramba	University of Idaho	16.46 m (54 ft 0 in)	+1.9
4	Hilary Mawindi	Washington State University	16.14 m (52 ft 11 1/4 in)	+2.0
5	Marcus Thomas	Louisiana State University	16.08 m (52 ft 9 in)	+3.2
6	Mel Moultry	UCLA	15.93 m (52 ft 3 in)	+2.8
7	Drexell Owusu	Rice University	15.92 m (52 ft 2 3/4 in)	+2.9
8	Lester Smith	University of Kansas	15.91 m (52 ft 2 1/4 in)	+2.6

=== Shot Put ===
Shot Put Final Results
Rank	Name	University	Distance
1st place, gold medalist(s)	Brad Snyder	University of South Carolina	19.70 m (64 ft 7 1/2 in)
2nd place, silver medalist(s)	Chima Ugwu	University of Arizona	19.03 m (62 ft 5 in)
3rd place, bronze medalist(s)	Jarkko Haukijarvi	University of Georgia	18.86 m (61 ft 10 1/2 in)
4	John Davis	University of Houston	18.75 m (61 ft 6 in)
5	Ian Waltz	Washington State University	18.57 m (60 ft 11 in)
6	Wade Tift	UCLA	18.52 m (60 ft 9 in)
7	Kevin Mannon	Rice University	18.47 m (60 ft 7 in)
8	Ralf Kahles	Louisiana State University	18.40 m (60 ft 4 1/4 in)

=== Discus ===
Discus Throw Final Results
Rank	Name	University	Distance
1st place, gold medalist(s)	Casey Malone	Colorado State University	61.02 m (200 ft 2 1/4 in)
2nd place, silver medalist(s)	Alex Forst	Louisiana State University	59.62 m (195 ft 7 in)
3rd place, bronze medalist(s)	Ian Waltz	Washington State University	59.40 m (194 ft 10 1/2 in)
4	Christer Hagberg	Manhattan College	58.88 m (193 ft 2 in)
5	Ben Lindsey	University of Washington	58.86 m (193 ft 1 1/4 in)
6	Jeremy Allen	University of Iowa	58.46 m (191 ft 9 1/2 in)
7	Luke Sullivan	UCLA	57.32 m (188 ft 1/2 in)
8	Brad Snyder	University of South Carolina	57.10 m (187 ft 4 in)

=== Hammer throw ===
Hammer Throw Final Results
Rank	Name	University	Distance
1st place, gold medalist(s)	Libor Charfreitag	SMU	72.30 m (237 ft 2 1/4 in)
2nd place, silver medalist(s)	Bengt Johansson	USC	72.22 m (236 ft 11 1/4 in)
3rd place, bronze medalist(s)	Mika Laiho	Arizona State University	71.48 m (234 ft 6 in)
4	Xavier Tison	SMU	69.28 m (227 ft 3 1/2 in)
5	Adam Connolly	Stanford	69.22 m (227 ft 1 in)
6	Travis Nutter	California	68.50 m (224 ft 8 3/4 in)
7	Marten Ejdervall	UTEP	67.24 m (220 ft 7 in)
8	Justin Strand	Stanford	66.68 m (218 ft 9 in)

=== Javelin throw ===
Javelin Throw Final Results
Rank	Name	University	Distance
1st place, gold medalist(s)	Esko Mikkola	University of Arizona	81.86 m (268 ft 6 3/4 in)
2nd place, silver medalist(s)	Daniel Gustafsson	SMU	76.66 m (251 ft 6 in)
3rd place, bronze medalist(s)	Mats Nilsson	University of Alabama	76.26 m (250 ft 2 1/4 in)
4	Josh Johnson	UCLA	75.74 m (248 ft 5 3/4 in)
5	Breaux Greer	NE Louisiana	74.26 m (243 ft 7 1/2 in)
6	Riku Valleala	University of Georgia	73.66 m (241 ft 8 in)
7	Tero Angeria	University of Georgia	72.54 m (237 ft 11 3/4 in)
8	Darin File	University of Missouri	70.06 m (229 ft 10 1/4 in)

=== Decathlon ===
Decathlon Final Results
Rank	Name	University	Points
1st place, gold medalist(s)	Klaus Ambrosch	University of Arizona	7825
2nd place, silver medalist(s)	Attila Zsivoczky	Kansas State	7817
3rd place, bronze medalist(s)	Brenden Falconer	Kent	7722
4	Ross Bomben	California	7693
5	Phil McMullen	Western Michigan	7613
6	Greg Gill	University of Wisconsin	7592
7	Daniel Haag	USC	7339
8	Kendall Madden	Texas A&M	7327

== Women's results ==
=== 100 meters ===
100 Meters Final Results
Rank	Name	University	Time
1st place, gold medalist(s)	Debbie Ferguson	University of Georgia	10.94
2nd place, silver medalist(s)	Shakedia Jones	UCLA	11.15
3rd place, bronze medalist(s)	Torri Edwards	University of Southern California	11.18
4	Tayna Lawrence	Florida International University	11.25
5	Kelli White	University of Tennessee	11.29
6	LaKeisha Backus	University of Texas	11.31
7	Tinesha Hackney	Texas Christian University	11.32

=== 200 meters ===
200 Meters Final Results
Rank	Name	University	Time
1st place, gold medalist(s)	Debbie Ferguson	University of Georgia	22.66
2nd place, silver medalist(s)	LaTasha Jenkins	Ball State University	22.93
3rd place, bronze medalist(s)	Shakedia Jones	UCLA	22.97
4	Kelli White	University of Tennessee	22.99
5	Tayna Lawrence	Florida International University	23.00
6	Torri Edwards	University of Southern California	23.24
7	LaKeisha Backus	University of Texas	23.31
8	Ameerah Bello	Morgan State University	23.35

=== 400 meters ===
400 Meters Final Results
Rank	Name	University	Time
1st place, gold medalist(s)	Suziann Reid	University of Texas	51.22
2nd place, silver medalist(s)	Yulanda Nelson	Baylor University	52.39
3rd place, bronze medalist(s)	Beverly Pierre	Seton Hall	52.55
4	Toya Brown	University of Texas	52.60
5	Carolyn Jackson	University of Arizona	52.61
6	Ameerah Bello	Morgan State University	52.65
7	Monique Hennagan	University of North Carolina	52.82
8	Cecile Cargill	University of Oklahoma	54.66

=== 800 meters ===
800 Meters Final Results
Rank	Name	University	Time
1st place, gold medalist(s)	Hazel Clark	University of Florida	2:02.16
2nd place, silver medalist(s)	Charmaine Howell	University of South Carolina	2:03.66
3rd place, bronze medalist(s)	Brigita Langerhole	USC	2:04.16
4	Chantee Earl	Pittsburgh	2:04.61
5	Mary Harrelson	Appalachian State University	2:04.63
6	Angela Stanifer	University of Georgia	2:04.64
7	Jeanette Castro	University of Texas at El Paso	2:06.05
8	Tytti Reho	SMU	2:07.45

=== 1500 meters ===
1500 Meters Final Results
Rank	Name	University	Time
1st place, gold medalist(s)	Carmen Douma	Villanova University	4:16.04
2nd place, silver medalist(s)	Kelly Smith	University of Colorado	4:16.23
3rd place, bronze medalist(s)	Grazyna Penc	USC	4:18.75
4	Hanne Lyngstad	Tulane University	4:19.80
5	Anna Lopaciuch	USC	4:21.28
6	Elissa Riedy	California	4:21.42
7	Angela Graham	Boston College	4:21.52
8	Jamie King	Eastern Kentucky University	4:21.54

=== 3000 meters steeplechase ===
3000 Meters Final Results
Rank	Name	University	Time
1st place, gold medalist(s)	Monal Chokshi	Stanford	9:20.18
2nd place, silver medalist(s)	Courtney Meldrum	Brigham Young University	9:22.91
3rd place, bronze medalist(s)	Sara Fredrickson	University of Wisconsin	9:23.90
4	Jessica Koch	University of Arkansas	9:25.04
5	Marie Davis	University of Oregon	9:25.74
6	Tracy Robertson	University of Arkansas	9:26.06
7	Jolene Williams	Coastal Carolina University	9:26.37
8	Jennifer Smith	University of Colorado	9:27.60

=== 5000 meters ===
5000 Meters Final Results
Rank	Name	University	Time
1st place, gold medalist(s)	Amy Skieresz	University of Arizona	15:37.77
2nd place, silver medalist(s)	Katie McGregor	University of Michigan	15:50.14
3rd place, bronze medalist(s)	Rosemary Ryan	Boston University	16:07.84
4	Mary Ellen Hill	Bradley University	16:08.72
5	Sharlyn Maughan	Weber State University	16:09.58
6	Jenna Rogers	Dartmouth College	16:12.33
7	Angie Kujak	University of Wisconsin	16:14.89
8	Karin Ernstrom	Baylor University	16:15.36

=== 10,000 meters ===
10,000 Meters Final Results
Rank	Name	University	Time
1st place, gold medalist(s)	Amy Skieresz	University of Arizona	33:04.12
2nd place, silver medalist(s)	Angie Kujak	University of Wisconsin	34:06.76
3rd place, bronze medalist(s)	Emily Nay	Brigham Young University	34:10.62
4	Catherine Wright	University of Tennessee at Chattanooga	34:13.54
5	Jackie Conrad	Ohio University	34:14.85
6	Charity Wachera	University of West Virginia	34:29.64
7	Tanya Povey	University of South Carolina	34:31.41
8	Alison Klemmer	Notre Dame University	34:32.95

=== 100 meters hurdles ===
100 Meters Hurdles Final Results
Rank	Name	University	Time
1st place, gold medalist(s)	Angie Vaughn	University of Texas	12.82
2nd place, silver medalist(s)	Andria King	Georgia Tech	13.17
3rd place, bronze medalist(s)	Brigitte Foster	SW Texas State	13.31
4	Jenny Adams	Houston	13.35
5	Miesha McKelvy	San Diego State University	13.35
6	Dominque Calloway	Ohio State University	13.39
7	Donica Merriman	Ohio State University	13.44
8	Joanna Hayes	UCLA	13.50

=== 400 meters hurdles ===
400 Meters Hurdles Final Results
Rank	Name	University	Time
1st place, gold medalist(s)	Rosa Jolivet	Texas A&M	55.24
2nd place, silver medalist(s)	Yvonne Harrison	University of Illinois	55.87
3rd place, bronze medalist(s)	Natasha Danvers	USC	56.35
4	Saidat Onanuga	UTEP	56.46
5	Patrina Allen	Miami-Florida	57.88
6	Dixie Williams	Brigham Young University	58.29
7	Deniece Bell	Syracuse University	58.56
8	Meka Rembert	University of Nebraska–Lincoln	59.15

=== 4x100-meter relay ===
4X100 Meter Relay Final Results
Rank	University	Time
1st place, gold medalist(s)	University of Texas	42.76
2nd place, silver medalist(s)	Louisiana State University	43.02
3rd place, bronze medalist(s)	Texas Christian University	43.69
4	UCLA	43.82
5	University of Georgia	44.07
6	University of Illinois	44.20
7	University of Florida	44.34
8	University of North Carolina	44.80

=== 4x400-meter relay ===
4X400 Meter Relay Final Results
Rank	University	Time
1st place, gold medalist(s)	University of Texas	3:28.65
2nd place, silver medalist(s)	Baylor University	3:29.90
3rd place, bronze medalist(s)	Seton Hall	3:31.00
4	University of Florida	3:31.35
5	University of Southern California	3:31.89
6	Louisiana State University	3:32.64
7	University of Nebraska–Lincoln	3:37.03
8	University of Oklahoma	3:39.88

=== High Jump ===
High Jump Final Results
Rank	Name	University	Height
1st place, gold medalist(s)	Erin Aldrich	University of Texas	1.93 m (6 ft 3 3/4 in)
2nd place, silver medalist(s)	Kajsa Bergqvist	Southern Methodist University	1.93 m (6 ft 3 3/4 in)
3rd place, bronze medalist(s)	Dora Gyorffy	Harvard University	1.90 m (6 ft 2 3/4 in)
4	Nicole Forrester	University of Michigan	1.84 m (6 ft 1/4 in)
5	Stacy Ann Grant	University of Illinois	1.84 m (6 ft 1/4 in)
6	Tracye Lawyer	Stanford University	1.81 m (5 ft 11 1/4 in)
7	Nakeitra Jones	Auburn University	1.77 m (5 ft 9 1/2 in)
8	Nathalie Belfort	University of Indiana	1.77 m (5 ft 9 1/2 in)

=== Pole Vault ===
Pole Vault Final Results
Rank	Name	University	Height
1st place, gold medalist(s)	Bianca Maran	Cal Poly	3.80 m (12 ft 5 1/2 in)
2nd place, silver medalist(s)	Kim Stewart	University of Nebraska–Lincoln	3.80 m (12 ft 5 1/2 in)
3rd place, bronze medalist(s)	Leslie Henley	University of Tennessee	3.80 m (12 ft 5 1/2 in)
4	Kristen Quackenbush	University of West Virginia	3.70 m (12 ft 1 1/2 in)
5	Melissa Feinstein	Stanford University	3.70 m (12 ft 1 1/2 in)
6	Paula Serrano	California Polytechnic State University	3.70 m (12 ft 1 1/2 in)
7	Kylene Nixon	University of South Carolina	3.70 m (12 ft 1 1/2 in)
8	Shannon Gallagher	Kent State University	3.70 m (12 ft 1 1/2 in)

=== Long Jump ===
Long Jump Final Results
Rank	Name	University	Distance	Wind
1st place, gold medalist(s)	Angie Brown	George Mason University	6.59 m (21 ft 7 1/4 in)	+2.2
2nd place, silver medalist(s)	Trecia Smith	Pittsburgh	6.42 m (21 ft 3/4 in)	+2.3
3rd place, bronze medalist(s)	Jenny Adams	Houston	6.31 m (20 ft 8 1/4 in)	+1.6
4	Yuan Hunt	Texas Southern	6.26 m (20 ft 6 1/4 in)	+2.1
5	Lecena Golding	Auburn University	6.19 m (20 ft 3 1/2 in)	+2.3
6	Ronalee Davis	Miami-Florida	6.19 m (20 ft 3 1/2 in)	+2.0
7	Dalhia Ingram	University of Nebraska–Lincoln	6.15 m (20 ft 2 in)	+3.0
8	Trina Radske	Iowa State University	6.13 m (20 ft 1 1/4 in)	+3.7

=== Triple Jump ===
Triple Jump Final Results
Rank	Name	University	Distance	Wind
1st place, gold medalist(s)	Trecia Smith	Pittsburgh University	13.98 m (45 ft 10 1/4 in)	-2.5
2nd place, silver medalist(s)	Stacey Bowers	Baylor University	13.62 m (44 ft 8 in)	5.1
3rd place, bronze medalist(s)	Nicole Gamble	University of North Carolina	13.40 m (43 ft 11 1/2 in)	-1.2
4	Deana Simmons	UCLA	13.20 m (43 ft 3 1/2 in)	-2.1
5	LaShonda Christopher	University of North Carolina	13.18 m (43 ft 2 3/4 in)	+0.7
6	Huina Han	Bowling Green	13.17 m (43 ft 2 1/2 in)	+3.0
7	Dalhia Ingram	University of Nebraska–Lincoln	12.97 m (42 ft 6 1/2 in)	+1.0
8	Tamieka Porter	Ohio State University	12.90 m (42 ft 3 3/4 in)	+3.7

=== Shot Put ===
Shot Put Final Results
Rank	Name	University	Distance
1st place, gold medalist(s)	Tressa Thompson	University of Nebraska–Lincoln	18.65 m (61 ft 2 1/4 in)
2nd place, silver medalist(s)	Teri Tunks	SMU	18.56 m (60 ft 10 1/2 in)
3rd place, bronze medalist(s)	Nada Kawar	UCLA	17.79 m (58 ft 4 1/4 in)
4	Amy Palmer	BYU	17.46 m (57 ft 3 1/4 in)
5	Marika Tuliniemi	SMU	17.24 m (56 ft 6 1/2 in)
6	Seilala Sua	UCLA	17.13 m (56 ft 2 1/4 in)
7	Crystal Brownlee	University of South Carolina	16.89 m (55 ft 4 3/4 in)
8	Jessica Cross	University of Wyoming	16.41 m (53 ft 10 in)

=== Discus ===
Discus Final Results
Rank	Name	University	Distance
1st place, gold medalist(s)	Seilala Sua	UCLA	64.22 m (210 ft 8 1/4 in)
2nd place, silver medalist(s)	Aretha Hill	University of Washington	58.66 m (192 ft 5 1/4 in)
3rd place, bronze medalist(s)	Shelly Borrman	Colorado State University	58.04 m (190 ft 5 in)
4	Suzy Powell	UCLA	57.06 m (187 ft 2 1/4 in)
5	Teri Tunks	Southern Methodist University	56.60 m (185 ft 8 1/4 in)
6	Nada Kawar	UCLA	56.08 m (183 ft 11 3/4 in)
7	Rachelle Noble	UCLA	55.28 m (181 ft 4 1/4 in)
8	Tressa Thompson	University of Nebraska–Lincoln	54.54 m (178 ft 11 in)

=== Hammer Throw ===
Hammer Throw Final Results
Rank	Name	University	Distance
1st place, gold medalist(s)	Lisa Misipeka	University of South Carolina	63.82 m (209 ft 4 1/2 in)
2nd place, silver medalist(s)	Amy Palmer	Brigham Young University	63.48 m (208 ft 3 in)
3rd place, bronze medalist(s)	Windy Dean	Southern Methodist University	62.00 m (203 ft 4 3/4 in)
4	Katie Panek	Wichita State University	60.86 m (199 ft 8 in)
5	Renetta Seiler	Kansas State University	60.40 m (198 ft 1 3/4 in)
6	Shelly Borrman	Colorado State University	59.08 m (193 ft 9 3/4 in)
7	Janet Visosky	University of Colorado	58.38 m (191 ft 6 1/4 in)
8	Michelle Fournier	University of South Carolina	58.16 m (190 ft 9 3/4 in)

=== Javelin Throw ===
Javelin Throw Final Results
Rank	Name	University	Distance
1st place, gold medalist(s)	Windy Dean	Southern Methodist University	56.28 m (184 ft 7 1/2 in)
2nd place, silver medalist(s)	Olivia McKoy	Louisiana Tech	53.92 m (176 ft 10 3/4 in)
3rd place, bronze medalist(s)	Nicole Chimko	University of Minnesota	53.92 m (176 ft 10 3/4 in)
4	Vigdis Gudjonsdottir	University of Georgia	53.50 m (175 ft 6 1/4 in)
5	Liza Randjelovic	Southern Methodist University	52.98 m (173 ft 9 3/4 in)
6	Esther Eisenlauer	Texas A&M	52.52 m (172 ft 3 1/2 in)
7	Kim Kreiner	Kent State University	52.40 m (171 ft 10 3/4 in)
8	Suzy Powell	UCLA	52.00 m (170 ft 7 in)

=== Heptathlon ===
Heptathlon Final Results
Rank	Name	University	Points
1st place, gold medalist(s)	Tiffany Lott	Brigham Young University	5982
2nd place, silver medalist(s)	Tracye Lawyer	Stanford	5789
3rd place, bronze medalist(s)	Candy Mason	University of Kansas	5637
4	Marsha Mark	Brigham Young University	5625
5	Erin Narzinski	University of South Carolina	5601
6	Jennifer Thomas	University of Oregon	5385
7	Tania Longe	University of Michigan	5364
8	Kathleen Ollendick	Virginia Tech	5358
