= Alphonso Jordan =

American triple jumper

Personal information
- Born: November 1, 1987 (age 38) El Paso, Texas, United States
- Education: Savannah College of Art and Design; Georgia Tech
- Height: 6 ft 3 in (191 cm)
- Weight: 182 lb (83 kg)

Sport
- Sport: Track and field
- Event: Triple jump

Alphonso David Jordan (born November 1, 1987, in El Paso, Texas) is an American track and field athlete specializing in the triple jump. He represented his country at the 2016 World Indoor Championships finishing twelfth.

His personal bests in the event are 16.89 metres outdoors (+0.9 m/s, Eugene 2015) and 16.57 metres indoors (Albuquerque 2011).

== Competition record ==
| Year | Competition | Venue | Position | Notes |
Representing the United States
| 2015 | Pan American Games | Toronto, Canada | 12th | 15.99 m |
| 2015 | NACAC Championships | San José, Costa Rica | 7th | 15.92 m (w) |
| 2016 | World Indoor Championships | Portland, United States | 12th | 16.11 m |
