= Homer Whelchel =

American javelin thrower

Personal information
- Born: December 31, 1899 Dawson County, Georgia, United States
- Died: August 12, 1974 (aged 74) Cordele, Georgia, United States

Sport
- Sport: Athletics
- Event: Javelin throw

Homer Whelchel (December 31, 1899 – August 12, 1974) was an American athlete. He competed in the men's javelin throw at the 1924 Summer Olympics.

Representing the Georgia Tech Yellow Jackets track and field team, Whelchel finished 5th at the 1922 NCAA Division I Outdoor Track and Field Championships.
