= Alan Drosky =

Alan James Drosky
Current position
- Title: Head coach
- Team: Georgia Tech
- Conference: ACC

Biographical details
- Born: Riverdale, Georgia, U.S.

Alan James Drosky is the head cross country running coach for both the men's and women's teams and the head track and field coach for the women's team at the Georgia Institute of Technology. Drosky is from Riverdale, Georgia where he graduated from Riverdale High School in 1982. Before becoming a coach at his alma mater, Alan Drosky was an All-American distance runner for the Yellow Jackets before graduating in 1987 with a degree in Industrial Management. He later returned to Tech to receive his master's degree in Management in 1989. Coach Drosky's immense impact on both the Georgia Tech Cross-Country and Track programs as both a coach and runner have helped to make both programs flourish over the last 30 years.

== Running career ==
Although Drosky did not begin his running career until his senior year at Riverdale High; it did not take long for him to become a star. In his first year running competitively, he won the state championship in the mile with a time of 4:14 and placed second in the 800m. Drosky initially enrolled at the University of South Carolina, but then transferred to Georgia Tech before his sophomore year. As a transfer student, Drosky redshirted his sophomore year and ran unattached. Going into his junior year and first eligible year at Georgia Tech, Drosky had a personal best of 1:49.47 in the 800m and 3:43.58 in the 1500m, which showed his potential for success at Tech.

During his junior year, Drosky led the Yellow Jackets at NCAA Regionals with a 53rd-place finish in the 10K with a time of 31:51. He also placed 31st in the ACC Championship with a time of 26:27. He began to truly shine during indoor season, setting the school record in the 1000m (2:23.20) and the distance medley relay running the 800m leg (10:17.80). Drosky also earned All-American honors placing 6th in the indoor mile. He continued his record-breaking year going into the outdoor season breaking four more records in the 1500m (3:43.38), the mile (4:04.70), the 3200m Relay, running with Prouty, Head and Macoy (7:36.40), and distance medley relay with Morrison, Macoy, and Head (9:59.30).

For Drosky and the Georgia Tech Yellow Jackets, 1986-87 seasons proved to be very memorable. During cross-country season, Drosky was named team captain and had a lot of responsibility being the only upperclassmen on the team. As captain, Drosky was the best runner, placing first for team in each race. He also accomplished great individual success, winning the individual state cross-country title and finishing 8th at the ACC Championship, the highest finish by a Tech athlete at the tournament in school history. Track season marked the opening of the new George C. Griffen Track and Field Facility where Drosky finished his running career at Tech in style. He was an ACC Champion in the indoor mile, All-ACC in the outdoor 1500m by second, and was an All-American in the 1500m at the NCAA Men's Outdoor Track and Field Championship with a school record of 4:04.7.

In 1996 Drosky was inducted into the Georgia Tech Athletic Hall of Fame for his accomplishments in Track and Cross-Country during his Georgia Tech career.

== Coaching career ==
Alan Drosky began his coaching career as a graduate assistant from 1987 to 1989 while he took classes to get a master's degree in Management. He became a full-time assistant coach in 1990 and then took over as the head coach of the men's and women's cross-country teams in 1992. As the head cross-country coach, Drosky coached three NCAA All-Americans, Kevin Graham (1994), Beth Mallory (1995), and Renee Metivier who finished second in 2001. He also coached eight NCAA qualifiers. Drosky hit the pinnacle of success as a cross-country coach in 1994 and 2001. In 1994 the men's and women's cross-country teams both placed third in the ACC, the highest placing the team had ever reached. In 2001 the women won the NCAA Regional South division, qualifying them for Nationals for the second consecutive year. The men placed a very respectable fourth. The success of both of his teams propelled Drosky to be named the South Region Coach of the Year by the U.S. Track Coaches Association in 2001. In 1996, he took over as head coach of the Women's Track and Field team and also began working with the men's distance team. His success as the women's head coach is marked by Georgia Tech's Atlantic Coast Conference Indoor Track title in 2002, the first ACC Championship Georgia Tech has won in track.

Coach Drosky has also coached many extremely successful distance runners. From 1994 to 1998, Drosky coached David Krummenacker who won back-to-back NCAA Men's Indoor Track and Field Championships in the 800m. Krummenacker was also a 12 time individual ACC Champion, an 8 time All-American, and broke many school records including both the indoor and outdoor 800m and 1500m. David Krummenacker also won the U.S. National Championship in 2001 under Coach Drosky's guidance. Krummenacker later went on to win two more U.S. National Titles and won the 800m IAAF World Indoor Championship in 2003. Drosky also coached Brandon Mahoney who was an All-American and ACC individual champion. Considered one of the most outstanding distance runners in Tech's history, Mahoney placed 7th in the mile at the 2002 NCAA Indoor Championships, 8th in the 800m at the 2002 NCAA Outdoor Championships, and also got on the podium for the 1500m at the Outdoor NCAA Championships to receive a total of three All-American honors. In 2004, Mahoney won individual ACC titles in the indoor 800m and mile as well as the outdoor 800m and 1500m. For these impressive performances, Mahoney was named ACC Performer of the Year for both the indoor and outdoor seasons.

Coach Drosky remains at the head men's and women's cross-country coach and the women's head track coach to this day.

== Personal life ==
Alan Drosky is married to Kim Drosky, a former runner at Georgia State University. Together they have two daughters, Hannah and Hayley. Their oldest daughter, Hayley, graduated from Chapel Hill High School in Douglasville, Georgia in 2010 and is now a freshman cross country runner for her father at Georgia Tech. Their younger daughter, Hannah, is currently a sophomore Cross Country Runner at Chapel Hill High School.
