= Tynita Butts-Townsend =

American high jumper (born 1990)

Personal information
- Born: Tynita Butts; June 10, 1990 (age 35) Hampton, Virginia, U.S.

Sport
- Sport: Athletics
- Event: High jump

Tynita Butts-Townsend (born June 10, 1990) is an American athlete competing in high jump. She competed at the collegiate level at East Carolina University.

Representing the United States at the 2019 World Athletics Championships, she placed eighth in the women's high jump. She qualified to represent the United States at the 2020 Summer Olympics.

She is married to Roderick Townsend-Roberts.
