= East Carolina Pirates =

Athletic teams that represent East Carolina University

- University: East Carolina University
- Nickname: Pirates
- NCAA: Division I (FBS)
- Conference: American
- Athletic director: Jon Gilbert
- Location: Greenville, North Carolina
- Varsity teams: 16 (7 men's, 9 women's)
- Football stadium: Dowdy–Ficklen Stadium
- Basketball arena: Williams Arena at Minges Coliseum
- Baseball stadium: Clark–LeClair Stadium
- Soccer field: Stewart Johnson Stadium
- Colors: Purple and gold
- Mascot: PeeDee the Pirate
- Fight song: E.C. Victory
- Website: ecupirates.com

American logo in East Carolina's colors

The East Carolina Pirates are the athletic teams that represent East Carolina University (ECU), located in Greenville, North Carolina. All varsity-level sports teams participate at the National Collegiate Athletic Association (NCAA) Division I (Football Bowl Subdivision (FBS) for football) level as a member of the American Conference. The school became an NCAA member in 1961.

== Name origin ==
Pirates have long been associated with the North Carolina coast. One of the most famous pirates, Blackbeard, resided in the North Carolina coastal communities of Bath, Beaufort and Ocracoke. The modern day mascot is based on the description of Blackbeard. Many other pirates used the shallow coast and Outer Banks to evade capture. ECU officially became the Pirates in 1934. In 1983, a contest was developed to name the Pirates. Children from all over Pitt County submitted their ideas, and Pee Dee the Pirate was chosen. The Pee Dee River is a river along the North Carolina and South Carolina border where pirates often set up camp. The name was less than popular with ECU students, and in 1985 Chancellor Howell decided on his own to drop "Pee Dee" and be known only as "The Pirates". People still use the terms Pee Dee and Petey as the terms for The Pirates, and PeeDee is still the name of their mascot.

== Fight song ==
E.C. Victory is the official fight song at East Carolina University. At the beginning of football games, the fight song with a fanfare, "Here's to the Pirates", the national anthem, and Alma Mater is played. The Marching Pirates play E.C. Victory a total of three times during the pregame show. The song is also played after touchdowns or field goals in football. At the end of football games, the football team walks to the student section to sing E.C. Victory in unison. Many alumni stay to sing the Alma Mater as the last sound before leaving Dowdy–Ficklen Stadium. At men's and women's basketball games the ECU Pep Band plays E.C. Victory at the beginning of the game, beginning of the second half and when additional crowd involvement is needed. Following the singing of "Take Me Out to the Ballgame" during the Seventh Inning stretch in baseball games, E.C. Victory is played to create additional Diamond Bucs support. The men's and women's swimming and diving teams sing E.C. Victory at their meets.

== Color origin ==
One of the first orders of business, once students arrived to East Carolina in 1909, was to decide on colors for the school. The students voted, and Old Gold and Royal Purple won. The university officially standardized these colors in 1916. ECU has been purple and gold ever since, though the current official colors have dropped adjectives describing the colors and now list them as Purple and Gold.

== Conference affiliations ==
NCAA

- Carolinas Intercollegiate Athletic Conference (1947–1962)
- Southern Conference (1964–1976)
- Colonial Athletic Association (1981–2001)
- Conference USA (2001–2014)
- American Conference (2014–present)

== Sports sponsored ==
Men's sports	Women's sports
Baseball	Basketball
Basketball	Cross country
Cross country	Golf
Football	Lacrosse
Golf	Soccer
Track & field^{†}	Softball
	Swimming & Diving
	Tennis
	Track & field^{†}
	Volleyball
† – Track and field includes both indoor and outdoor.

=== Men's basketball ===
ECU Men's Basketball is coached by Michael Schwartz and play in Williams Arena at Minges Coliseum. The Pirates appeared in the NAIA National Tournament two years (1953 and 1954), each year losing in the first round. The Pirates have also made two appearances in the NCAA Tournament, with the latest appearance occurring in 1993 where they played the North Carolina Tar Heels. East Carolina has had four players to reach the NBA level, Theodore "Blue" Edwards, who was selected by the Utah Jazz with the 21st overall pick of the 1989 NBA draft, Oliver Mack who was selected by the Los Angeles Lakers as the third pick in the second round of the 1979 NBA draft, George Maynor, who was selected by the Chicago Bulls as the sixth pick in the fourth round of the 1979 NBA Draft, and Charles Alford, who was selected by the Los Angeles Lakers as the ninth pick in the tenth round of the 1968 NBA draft.

In his first season (2010–2011) at ECU Coach Jeff Lebo took the Pirates to their first postseason game since 1993 when the Pirates lost to Jacksonville in the first round of the 2011 CollegeInsider.com Tournament. In 2013, still under Head Coach Jeff Lebo, the Pirates enjoyed a twenty win regular season and were invited to participate in the CBS Sports sponsored College Insider Tournament. On Tuesday, April 2, 2013, East Carolina won the College Insider Postseason Tournament against Weber State with a three-point buzzer shot 77–74.

=== Women's basketball ===
The 2015–16 Lady Pirates are led by head coach Heather Macy who led the team to a 22–11 overall and 11–7 American Athletic Conference record in 2014–15, her fifth season at the helm.

The ECU Lady Pirates won the 2023 AAC conference tournament. They have made it to the NCAA Women's Division I Tournament three times, 2023, 2007, and 1982. During the 1982 season the Pirates compiled a 17–9 record and were placed as the 6th seed in the Midwest Regional, but lost in the first round of the tournament to South Carolina 79–54. In 2007 the Lady Pirates claimed their first Conference USA tournament title with an upset victory over the Rice Owls. During the regular season the team had a record of 19–13. For the NCAA Tournament the Pirates earned the 13th seed in the Dayton Regional before falling to eventual runner-up 4th seed Rutgers by a score of 77–34.

The Lady Pirates are coming off of their third consecutive 22-win season. They will be led by Jada Payne, of Hickory, North Carolina, who is a redshirt senior transfer from LeSalle. Jada is coming off of a record-breaking year where she became the 22nd player in ECU women's basketball history to have 1,000 career points in the 2014–2015 campaign and broke her previous record for three-pointers made in a season, with 80. She also surpassed her own school record for free throw percentage in a season (.865) and ended the season as the 17th highest scorer in the program's history with 1,132 points.

The first season for the women's team was 1969, and they have an overall record of 681–562 (.548) as of the end of the 2014–2015 season.

The team also won back-to-back Colonial Athletic Association tournament titles in 1984, beating Richmond 54–39, and in 1985 by beating James Madison 65–59 after also winning the Colonial Athletic Association regular season championship with an 11–1 conference record. In 1986 the Lady Pirates made their third straight Colonial Athletic Association title game appearance but fell to James Madison 66–62. Overall while in the Colonial Athletic Association the Lady Pirates made 7 tournament title game appearances with a 2–5 record with appearances in 1984, 1985, 1986, 1991, 1992, 1997, and 1999.

One jersey has been retired from the women's team: Rosalyn "Rosie" Thompson.

=== Football ===
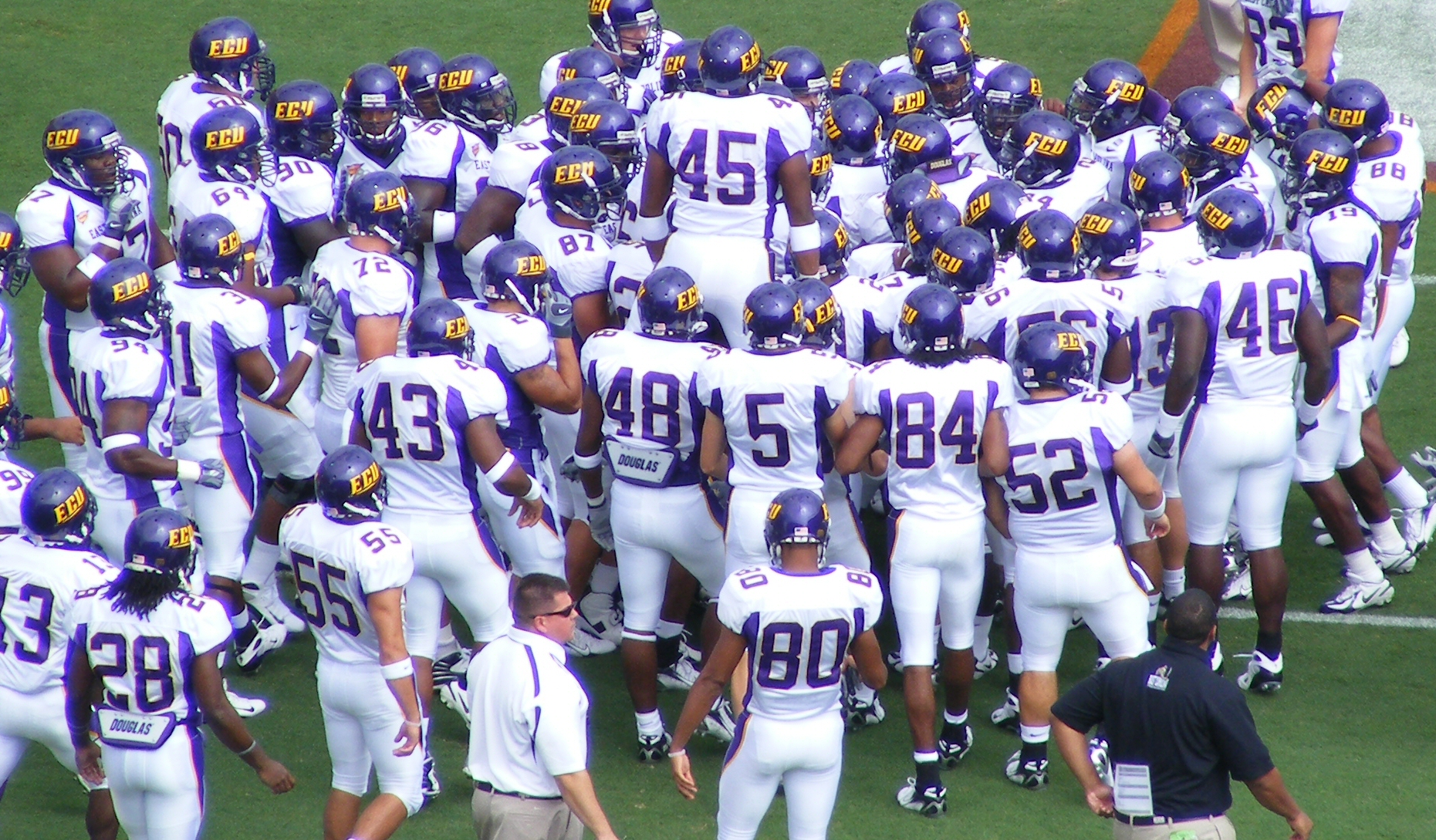
The East Carolina Pirates gather at the sideline as they prepare to take on the 2007 Virginia Tech Hokies football team

The ECU Pirates football team plays its home games at Dowdy–Ficklen Stadium on the ECU campus. The current head coach of the Pirates is Blake Harrell. Football started in 1932 and the Pirates have been to 20 bowl games, including 7 in the last 8 years. ECU has won two C-USA championships; in 2008, they defeated Tulsa (27–24) and in 2009, they defeated Houston (38–32).

In 2007, ECU was chosen to play in the Sheraton Hawaii Bowl against the Boise State Broncos. The Pirates stunned the #24-ranked Broncos, quelling a late Broncos rally, on a game-winning field goal 41–38. Running back Chris Johnson was the game's most valuable player, setting an NCAA record by gathering 407 all-purpose yards. In the 2007–2008 season, ECU produced upset victories over #17 Virginia Tech and #8 West Virginia. The Pirates rode the wave all the way to their first C-USA championship by beating Tulsa, only to lose a heart breaker to Kentucky in the Liberty Bowl. In the 2009 season, the Pirates lost two early season games to North Carolina and West Virginia before going on to win the C-USA East Division Title for the second straight year. East Carolina finished the 2009 regular season at 8–4 over all 7–1 in conference play. ECU won the 2009 C-USA Conference Championship game in Dowdy–Ficklen Stadium on December 5, 2009, at 12 noon, upsetting the 18th-ranked University of Houston, 38–32. The East Carolina Pirates are the first back-to-back C-USA champions since divisional play was started in 2005. The Pirates lost another heartbreaking Liberty Bowl on January 2, 2010, in Memphis, Tennessee. The Pirates lost to Arkansas 20–17 in overtime after ECU missed a game-winning field goal to end regulation play. The 2010 Auto Zone Liberty Bowl tied ECU with Arkansas, Air Force, Alabama, Louisville and Mississippi for the most Liberty Bowl appearances at 4 each.

Twenty-one Pirate student-athletes have been honored as football All-Americans in addition to other awards. ECU has had 63 players selected in the NFL draft since 1951. The Pirates had at least one player chosen in the NFL draft from 2006 to 2011, and has had two first round selections: the No. 24 overall pick in the 1992 and 2008 drafts. ECU has produced eight players who have played in 11 Super Bowls dating back to 1985. Five of those Pirates have won World Championships.

=== Swimming and diving ===
The men's team started in the 1953–54 season and the women's team started in the 1977–78 season. In 1957, the men's swimming and diving team became the first team at ECU to win a national championship, by winning the 1957 NAIA National Championship under the leadership of Dr. Ray Martinez. The men's swimming and diving team also won the 1959 NAIA National Championship. Over the years, 87 ECU swimmers and divers have been All-Americans. Head Coach Rick Kobe (1982–2017) won 11 championships with the Pirates. The men's teams were conference champions in 1986 and 1989 in the Colonial Athletic Association, and 2015, 2016, and 2017 in the American Athletic Conference. The women's team won conference championships in 1995, 1996, 1997 and 2000 in the CAA; 2001 in the East Coast Athletic Conference; and 2003 in C-USA. Head coach Matthew Jabs led the program with associate head coach Kate Moore, assistants Kevin Woodhull-Smith and Christa Saunders; Jesse Lyman serves as the head diving coach. The most recent championship came in 2020, as the men's team won another American Athletic Conference title, the program's fourth in six years. Both men's and women's swimming and diving programs were cut in the spring 2020. In the spring of 2021 the women's team was reinstated, and began competing again in the fall of 2021.

=== Baseball ===
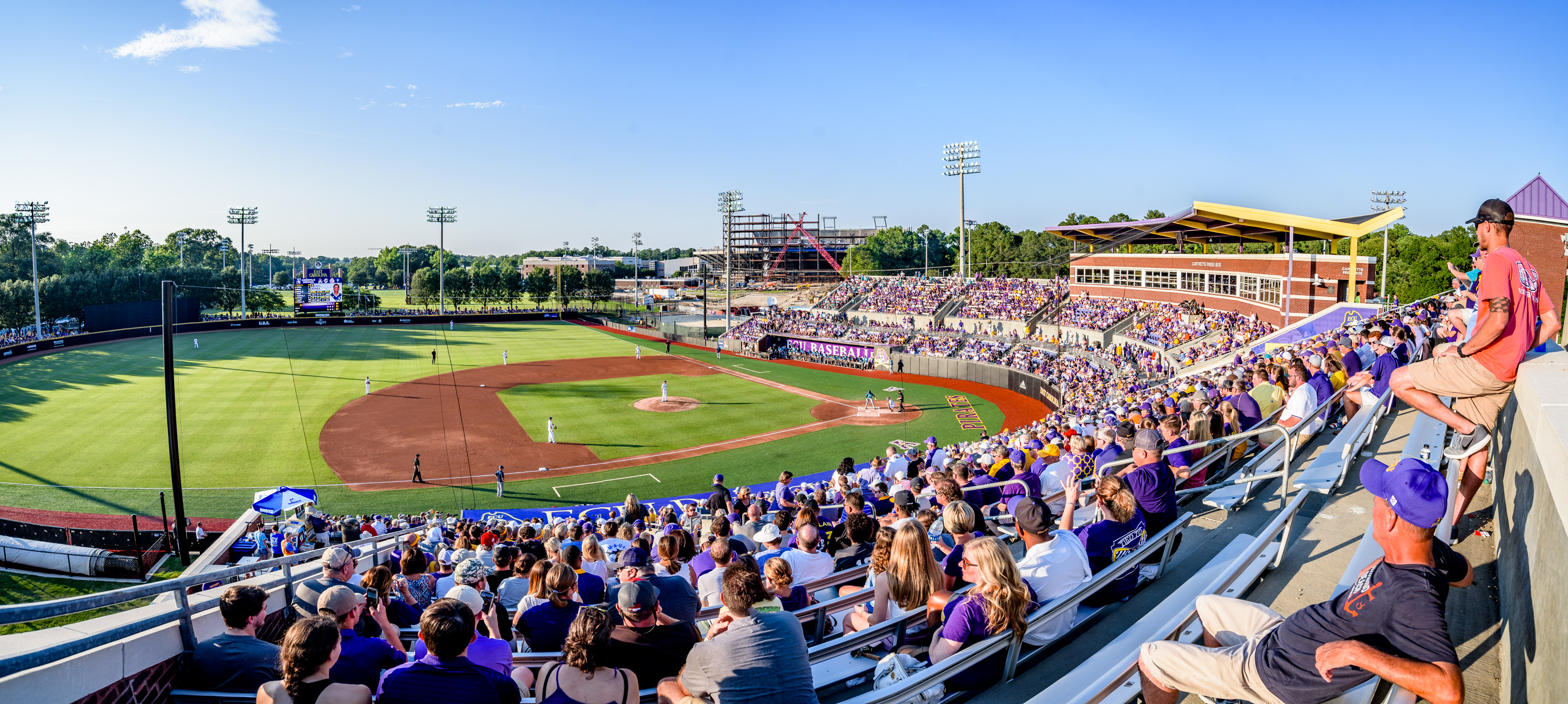
A Pirates baseball game in the 2018 NCAA Division I baseball tournament

The ECU baseball team, nicknamed the Diamond Bucs, is a NCAA Division I program that competes in the American Conference. The men's baseball team currently plays at Clark-LeClair Stadium on campus. ECU baseball has consistently finished with a winning record over the past several years. The Pirates have gone to the NCAA Regional Tournament 25 times (including 10 times since 2000), appeared in three NCAA Baseball Super Regionals, won two Conference USA regular-season championships, won one Conference USA conference tournament championship, and have won 40+ games in five of the last seven seasons. Over the years, 15 players have been honored as All-Americans and over 100 former players have played in the Major Leagues. The Diamond Bucs baseball program have won one national championship, winning the 1961 NAIA National Championship. The previous coach was Billy Godwin whose contract wasn't renewed for the 2015 season. Cliff Godwin, an ECU alumni has replaced him. In Godwin's first season, won the 2015 American Athletic Conference baseball tournament. In Godwin's second season, he led the Pirates to the Lubbock Super Regional, after sweeping the Charlottesville Regional. In 2017, ECU garnered a #6 pre-season ranking from Baseball America.

ECU has the most NCAA tournament appearances of any team that has never reached the Men's College World Series.

=== Softball ===
The ECU Lady Pirates won the 2010 C-USA Softball regular season and conference tournament titles. The head coach of the Lady Bucs is Shane Winkler.

Pitcher Toni Paisley was drafted 10th overall in the 2011 National Pro Fastpitch Draft by the Akron Racers.

Regular season conference titles

- 2010 C-USA

Conference tournament titles

- 2010 C-USA
- 2011 C-USA

=== Men's golf ===
The men's golf team has won 10 conference championships:

- Southern Conference (3): 1969, 1971, 1972
- Colonial Athletic Association (7): 1987, 1988, 1990, 1991, 1992, 1993, 1994

=== Women's soccer ===
The women's soccer team represents East Carolina University in NCAA Division I college soccer and competes in the American Athletic Conference. The Pirates are coached by Emily Buccilla, and play their home games at Bill Clark Homes Field at Johnson Stadium, a 1,000-seat stadium located in Greenville, North Carolina. The stadium opened on August 19, 2011. The stadium was selected as one of the hosts for the 2020 NCAA Division I Women's Soccer Tournament and 2020 NCAA Division I Men's Soccer Tournament.The Pirates won the 2024 American Conference Tournament Championship with a 1–0 win over No. 19 Memphis, reaching their first ever NCAA Tournament. The team ultimately lost in the opening round to No. 14 South Carolina.

- C-USA (1): 2008

=== Other sports teams ===
Additional varsity men's teams include cross country, tennis and track and field (indoor and outdoor).

Other varsity women's teams include cross country, golf, lacrosse, soccer, tennis, track and field (indoor and outdoor), and volleyball.

Women's other sports teams conference championships

- Outdoor track and field – 2000 CAA
- Indoor track and field – 2012 & 2014 C-USA
