= David Krummenacker =

American middle-distance runner

Personal information
- Born: May 24, 1975 (age 51) El Paso, Texas, U.S.
Medal record
Men's athletics
Representing the United States
World Indoor Championships
Gold medal – first place	2003 Birmingham	800 metres

David Krummenacker (born May 24, 1975) is an American retired middle-distance runner. A member of the Bahá'í Faith, he is best known for winning the 800 metres at the 2003 IAAF World Indoor Championships and claiming three consecutive U.S. outdoor 800 m titles from 2001 to 2003.

== Background ==
Krummenacker was born in El Paso, Texas. He graduated from Las Cruces High School in New Mexico in 1993, where he won several state track titles and also played on the basketball team.

He attended Georgia Tech, where he trained under coach Alan Drosky. In his sophomore year (1994), he suffered an Achilles tendon injury that sidelined him for much of the season; he recovered without surgery, later crediting the setback with renewing his love of the sport. He went on to win back-to-back NCAA Indoor 800 m titles (1997–1998) and was named the ACC's Most Valuable Performer in both the indoor and outdoor championships in each of those years. Across his collegiate career he earned six ACC indoor and outdoor 800 m titles, three ACC 1500 m titles, four ACC 4×400 relay titles, and nine All-American honours. He graduated in 1998 with a degree in management. In 2008, he was inducted into the Georgia Tech Athletic Hall of Fame.

== Athletic career ==
Krummenacker was the 2003 World and U.S. Indoor 800 m champion. In March 2003, at the 2003 IAAF World Indoor Championships in Birmingham, England, he surged past world-record holder Wilson Kipketer of Denmark to win the 800 m in a personal best of 1:45.69. He won back-to-back-to-back U.S. Outdoor 800 m titles from 2001 to 2003, becoming the first runner to win three straight since Johnny Gray accomplished the feat from 1985 to 1987. The only person to win the title more than three consecutive times was James Robinson (1978–1982).

In 2000, Krummenacker anchored a world-record U.S. quartet in the 4×800 metres relay. He failed to qualify for the 2000 Summer Olympics in either the 800 m or 1500 m. At the 2004 U.S. Olympic Trials, he was considered the premier American middle-distance runner and a strong favourite in the 800 m, but finished fourth in the final, narrowly missing the Olympic team.

His personal records include 1:43.92 (2002) for the 800 m and 3:31.91 (2002) for the 1500 m. He trained in Tucson, Arizona under coach Luiz de Oliviera and competed for Adidas.

=== Post-competitive career ===
After stepping back from top-level competition, Krummenacker became a professional pacemaker (or "rabbit"). His pacemaking career began in the 2009 outdoor season when he accepted an assignment at the Aviva London Grand Prix, pacing both the 800 m and the mile. He found the role aligned naturally with his personal philosophy: "I never prayed for victory," he said, "just that I would perform to the best of my ability and everyone else would remain healthy and run well. So when a race is paced evenly and there are good times, I feel joyful to have been a part of that process."

== Personal life ==
Krummenacker resides in Tucson, Arizona, with his wife, Karima White, a teacher, and his mother, Maryam. He has other interests including surfing, playing chess, music, and reading. He has used a training base near Stuttgart, Germany, during the European track season.

=== Bahá'í Faith ===
Krummenacker is a member of the Bahá'í Faith, in which he was raised by his mother in Las Cruces, New Mexico. He has spoken openly about the role of spirituality in his athletic life, stating that spirituality "is the essence of our existence and athletics is no exception." He credits his faith with shaping his approach to competition: he never prays for victory, only for strength, health, and the wellbeing of fellow competitors. He has said he is "very grateful for having had the guidance of Bahá'u'lláh from day one." His mother runs a global Bahá'í women's prayer network whose members pray for him during competitions.
