= 1994 NCAA Division I Outdoor Track and Field Championships =

- Men's Champion: Arkansas (4th title); Women's Champion: LSU (8th title)
- Edition: 73rd (Men); 13th (Women)
- Dates: June 1−4, 1994
- Host city: Boise, Idaho
- Venue: Bronco Stadium; Boise State University
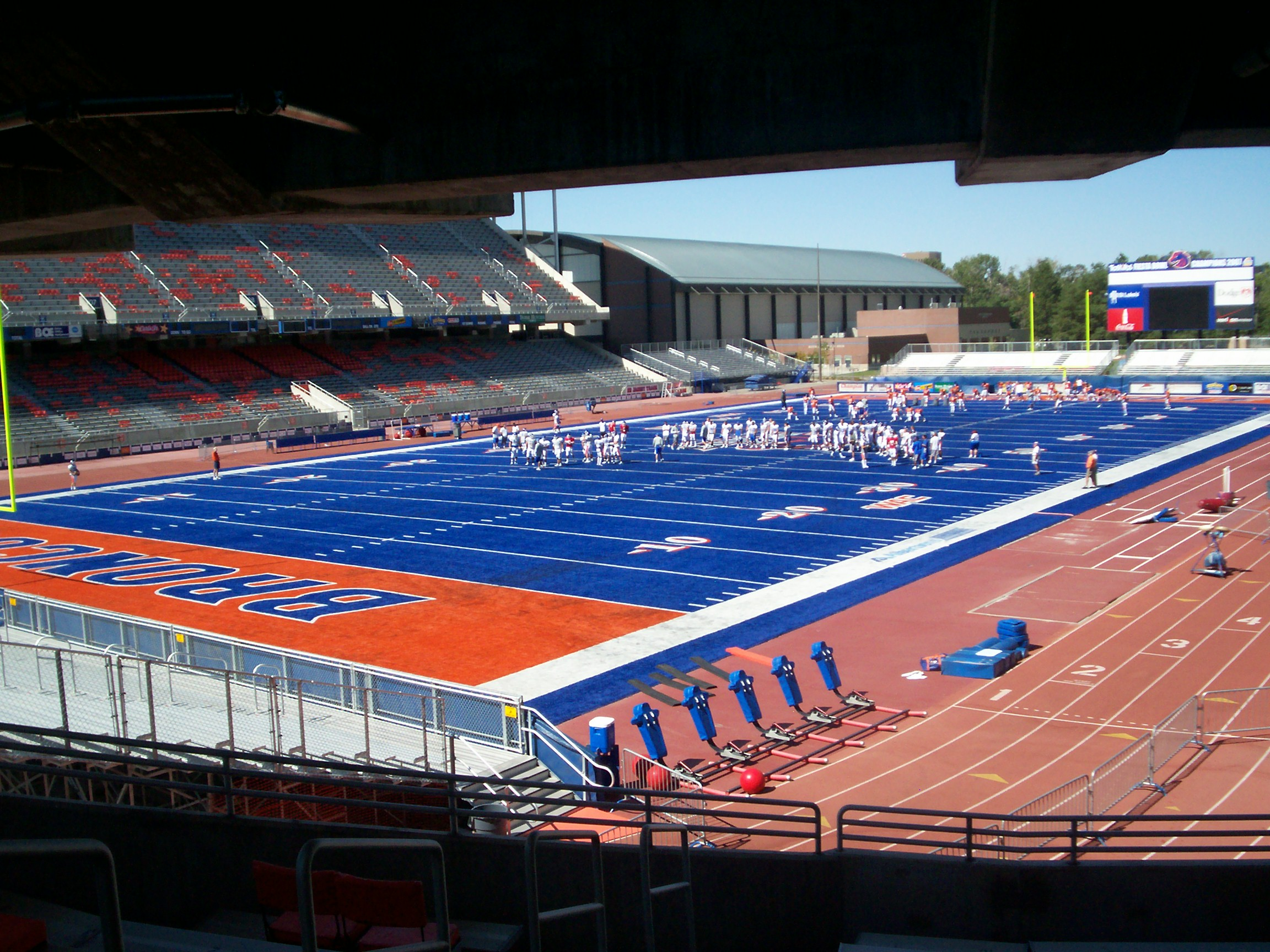
- Type: Outdoor

The 1994 NCAA Division I Outdoor Track and Field Championships were contested June 1−4 at Bronco Stadium at Boise State University in Boise, Idaho. It determined the individual and team national champions of men's and women's collegiate Division I outdoor track and field events in the United States.

These were the 73rd annual men's championships and the 13th annual women's championships. This was the Broncos' first time hosting the event; it returned to Boise five years later.

In a repeat of the previous two years' results, Arkansas and LSU topped the men's and women's team standings, respectively; it was the Razorbacks' fourth men's team title and the eighth for the Lady Tigers. This was the third of eight consecutive titles for Arkansas. The Lady Tigers, meanwhile, captured their eighth consecutive title and, ultimately, the eighth of eleven straight titles they won between 1987 and 1997.

With a final day attendance of 10,493 on Saturday, the four-day total was 34,816.

== Team results ==
- Note: Top 10 only
- (H) = Hosts
- Full results

=== Men's standings ===
Rank	Team	Points
1st place, gold medalist(s)	Arkansas	69
2nd place, silver medalist(s)	UTEP	45
3rd place, bronze medalist(s)	Tennessee	38
4	Georgia Tech	34
5	Fresno State	28
6	Houston; LSU	27
8	Georgia	24
9	Baylor	23
10	USC	20

=== Women's standings ===
Rank	Team	Points
1st place, gold medalist(s)	LSU	93
2nd place, silver medalist(s)	Texas	43
3rd place, bronze medalist(s)	UCLA	42
4	Villanova	39
5	Tennessee	30
6	Indiana State; North Carolina	24
8	Seton Hall	22
9	Pittsburgh	21
10	Arizona State; Rice	19
