= Octavius Terry =

American hurdler (born 1972)

Personal information
- Born: November 7, 1972 (age 53) Fairburn, Georgia, U.S.
- Height: 6 ft 2 in (1.88 m)
- Weight: 171 lb (78 kg)
Medal record
Men's athletics
Representing the United States
Summer Universiade
Gold medal – first place	1997 Catania	4x400m relay
Silver medal – second place	1995 Fukuoka	400m hurdles

Octavius Terry (born November 7, 1972) is an American former hurdler. He graduated from Creekside High School in Fairburn, Georgia in 1991. He then went to Georgia Tech where he was the 1994 NCAA Champion in the 400 hurdles. The following year was his peak year, finishing third at the 1995 USA Outdoor Track and Field Championships, qualifying him for the 1995 World Championships in Athletics. He finished sixth in his semi-final race and did not advance to the final. That same year he was a representative at the World University Games where he picked up a silver medal. Two years later, he returned to the University Games, failing in the hurdles but winning a gold medal leading off the American 4x400 metres relay.

In 2024, Octavius was featured in the documentary Light Up, directed by Ryan Ashley Lowery.

In 2026 he competed on season 22 of Project Runway.

== Personal life ==
In 2019, Terry and his life partner Jamal Sims ended their marriage.
