= Derek Mills =

American sprinter

Personal information
- Nationality: American
- Born: July 9, 1972 (age 54) Washington, D.C., U.S.

Sport
- Sport: Running
- Event: Sprints
- College team: Georgia Tech Yellow Jackets

Achievements and titles
- Personal best: 400 m: 44.13 (Eugene 1995)
Medal record
Men's athletics
Representing the United States
Olympic Games
Gold medal – first place	1996 Atlanta	4 × 400 m relay
World Championships
Gold medal – first place	1995 Gothenburg	4 × 400 m relay
World Junior Championships
Gold medal – first place	1990 Plovdiv	4 × 400 m relay

Derek Mills (born July 9, 1972) is an American former sprinter. He was a 1996 Olympic Games gold medalist in the men's 4 × 400 meter relay for the United States. He has a career best of 44.13 in the 400 m. After going to college at Georgia Tech in Atlanta and winning the 1994 NCAA Championship in the 400 m at Boise, Idaho, Mills ran to a #2 World Ranking behind Michael Johnson—breaking 45.00 seven times that year.

A native of Washington, D.C., Mills attended DeMatha Catholic High School in Hyattsville, Maryland.

Mills received his juris doctor from Tulane University Law School and his MBA from the Freeman School of Business at Tulane University in 2006. He is currently an assistant track and field coach at Tulane University in New Orleans, Louisiana.

Mills is the step-father of National Football League player Odell Beckham Jr. He was previously engaged to Heather Van Norman, Beckham's mother. Who earned six-time NCAA All-American honors in Track & Field while at Louisiana State University and a long-time collegiate track coach. They have a child together named Jasmyne. He does have roots in North Carolina. He grew up visiting his third cousins on Camp Branch, Dave, Daryl, Kelly and DeWayne.
