= List of United States collegiate records in track and field =

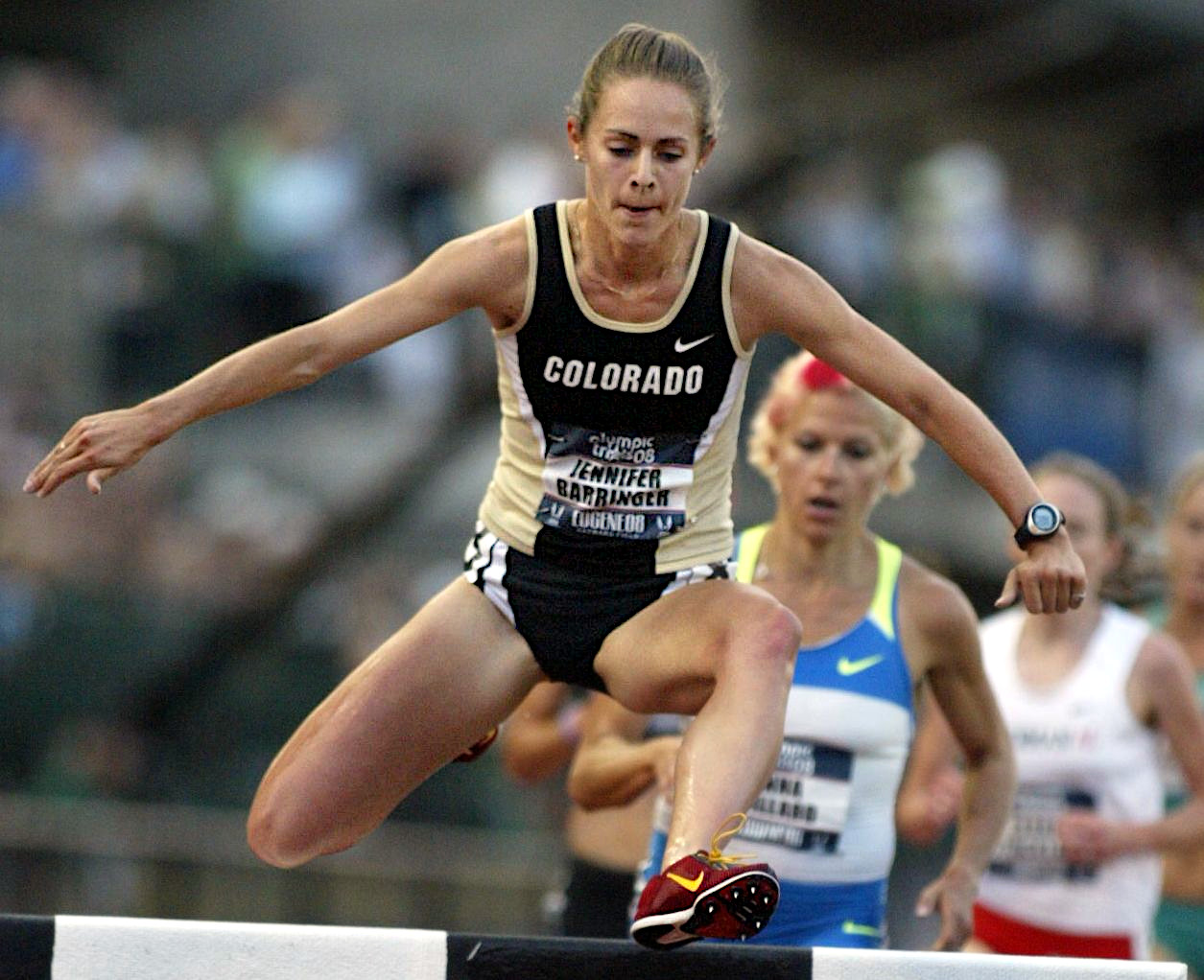
Jenny Barringer set collegiate records in six events representing the Colorado Buffaloes, though none of them still stand

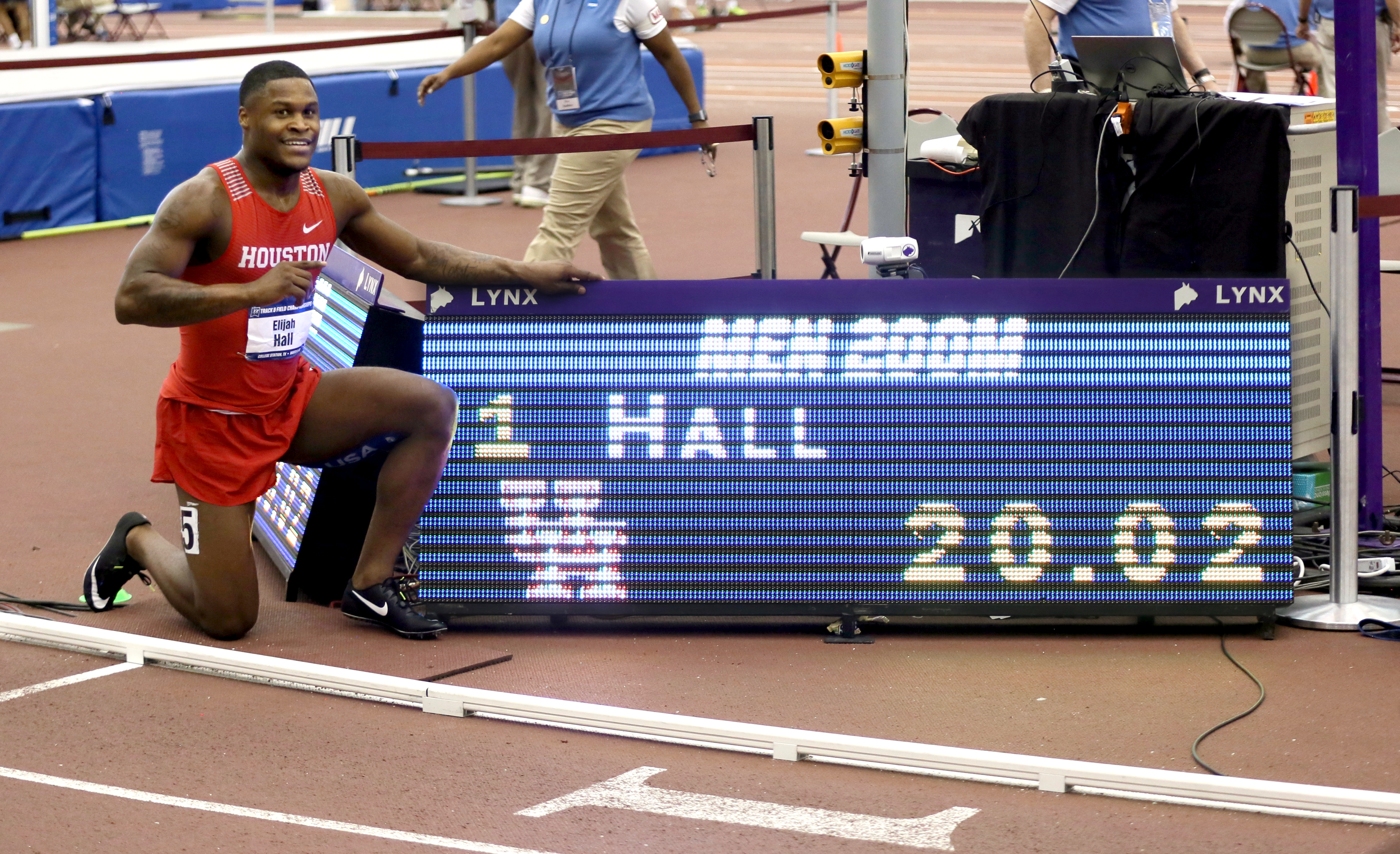
Elijah Hall posing with the clock after setting a collegiate record of 20.02 seconds in the indoor 200 m, a mark that also stands as the American record and the No. 2 performance of all time

The United States collegiate records in track and field are the best marks in track and field events from collegiate athletes (of any nationality), done while the athletes were competing for an American institution of higher education. The National Collegiate Athletic Association (NCAA) track and field system has been touted as one of the main reasons for the success of the United States on the global stage of athletics. All of the collegiate records come from athletes competing in the NCAA, with the exception of the outdoor women's 1500 metres record (NAIA).

In the case of outdoor record-breaking performances achieved during the summer after the relevant national collegiate spring track and field championship (for example, the NCAA Division I Outdoor Track and Field Championships) has passed, both the best summer mark and the best in-season mark are listed.

Some of the records are maintained by the U.S. Track & Field and Cross Country Coaches Association or the Track & Field News publication.

== Outdoor ==
Key: Awaiting USTFCCCA ratification record by American-born athlete(s) (only where marks would differ) Not ratified or later rescinded by USTFCCCA

PS = mark made in postseason after the spring collegiate national championships

=== Men ===
| Event | Record | Athlete | Team | Date | Meet | Place | Ref. |
|---|---|---|---|---|---|---|---|
| 100 m | 9.82 (+1.3 m/s) | Christian Coleman | Tennessee Volunteers | June 7, 2017 | NCAA Division I Championships | Eugene, Oregon | |
| 200 m | 19.63 (+1.5 m/s) | (Cayman Islands) Jaiden Reid | LSU Tigers | June 12, 2026 | NCAA Division I Championships | Eugene, Oregon | |
| 200 m | 19.69 (+0.9 m/s) | Walter Dix | Florida State Seminoles | May 25, 2007 | NCAA DI East Regional | Gainesville, Florida | |
| 400 m | 43.38 | (Nigeria) Samuel Ogazi | Alabama Crimson Tide | June 12, 2026 | NCAA Division I Championships | Eugene, Oregon | |
| 400 m | 43.61 | Michael Norman | USC Trojans | June 8, 2018 | NCAA Division I Championships | Eugene, Oregon | |
| 400 m | 43.50 PS | Quincy Watts | USC Trojans | August 5, 1992 | Olympic Games | Barcelona, Spain | |
| 800 m | 1:43.25 | (Kenya) Michael Saruni | UTEP Miners | April 28, 2018 | Desert Heat Classic | Tucson, Ariz. | |
| 800 m | 1:43.55 | Donavan Brazier | Texas A&M Aggies | June 10, 2016 | NCAA Division I Championships | Eugene, Oregon | |
| 1500 m | 3:31.69 | Simeon Birnbaum | Oregon Ducks | April 18, 2026 | Oregon Team Invitational | Eugene, Oregon | |
| 1500 m | 3:30.20 PS | (Spain) Mario García | Ole Miss Rebels | July 19, 2022 | World Championships | Eugene, Oregon | |
| 1500 m | 3:30.90 PS | Andrew Wheating | Oregon Ducks | July 22, 2010 | Herculis | Monaco | |
| Mile | 3:52.44 | (South Africa) (United States) Sydney Maree | Villanova Wildcats | May 30, 1981 | Villanova, Pennsylvania | Villanova, Pennsylvania | |
| Mile | 3:53.2 h | Jim Ryun | Kansas Jayhawks | June 2, 1967 | Los Angeles, California | Los Angeles, California | |
| Mile | 3:53.2 h | Tony Waldrop | North Carolina Tar Heels | April 27, 1974 | Philadelphia, Pennsylvania | Philadelphia, Pennsylvania | |
| Mile | 3:50.34 PS | Todd Harbour | Baylor Bears | July 11, 1981 | Oslo, Norway | Oslo, Norway | |
| 3000 m | 7:37.70 | Rudy Chapa | Oregon Ducks | May 10, 1979 | NCAA Division I Championships | Eugene, Oregon | |
| 3000 m | 7:32.1 h PS | (Kenya) Henry Rono | Washington State Cougars | June 27, 1978 | Oslo, Norway | Oslo, Norway | |
| 5000 m | 12:57.22 | (Eritrea) Habtom Samuel | New Mexico Lobos | May 23, 2026 | Sound Running LA Track Fest | Los Angeles, California | |
| 5000 m | 13:06.32 | Abdihamid Nur | Northern Arizona Lumberjacks | May 6, 2022 | Sound Running Track Meet | San Juan Capistrano, California | |
| 5000 m | 13:00.95 PS | (Kenya) (United States) Lawi Lalang | Arizona Wildcats | July 19, 2013 | Fontvieille, Monaco | Fontvieille, Monaco | |
| 10,000 m | 26:50.21 | (Kenya) Ishmael Kipkurui | New Mexico Lobos | March 29, 2025 | The TEN | San Juan Capistrano, California | |
| 10,000 m | 26:52.72 | Nico Young | Northern Arizona Lumberjacks | March 16, 2024 | The TEN | San Juan Capistrano, California | |
| 110 m hurdles | 12.75 (+1.0 m/s) WR | Ja'Kobe Tharp | Auburn Tigers | June 10, 2026 | NCAA Division I Championships | Eugene, Oregon | |
| 400 m hurdles | 47.02 | Rai Benjamin | USC Trojans | June 8, 2018 | NCAA Division I Championships | Eugene, Oregon | |
| 3000 m steeplechase | 8:05.4 h | (Kenya) Henry Rono | Washington State Cougars | May 13, 1978 | Northwest Relays | Seattle, Washington | |
| 3000 m steeplechase | 8:13.87 PS | James Corrigan | BYU Cougars | June 29, 2024 | Penn Relays Summer Showcase | Philadelphia, Pennsylvania | |
| High jump | 2.38 m A | Hollis Conway | Louisiana Ragin' Cajuns | June 3, 1989 | NCAA Division I Championships | Provo, Utah | |
| Pole vault | 6.00 m | (United States) (Sweden) Armand Duplantis | LSU Tigers | May 11, 2019 | SEC Championships | Fayetteville, Arkansas | |
| Long jump | 8.74 m A (+2.0 m/s) | Erick Walder | Arkansas Razorbacks | April 2, 1994 | UTEP Springtime Invitational | El Paso, Texas | |
| Triple jump | 17.87 m (+1.3 m/s) | (Jamaica) Jaydon Hibbert | Arkansas Razorbacks | May 13, 2023 | SEC Championships | Baton Rouge, Louisiana | |
| Triple jump | 17.54 m | Mike Conley Sr. | Arkansas Razorbacks | June 1, 1985 | Austin, Texas | Austin, Texas | |
| Shot put | 22.00 m | John Godina | UCLA Bruins | June 3, 1995 | NCAA Division I Championships | Knoxville, Tennessee | |
| Discus throw | 71.00 m | (Lithuania) Mykolas Alekna | California Golden Bears | April 29, 2023 | Big Meet | Berkeley, California | |
| Discus throw | 74.35 m WR | (Lithuania) Mykolas Alekna | California Golden Bears | April 14, 2024 | Oklahoma Throws Series World Invitational | Ramona, Oklahoma | |
| Discus throw | 67.45 m | Sam Mattis | Penn Quakers | March 19, 2016 | | Philadelphia, Pennsylvania | |
| Hammer throw | 81.94 m | (Hungary) Balazs Kiss | USC Trojans | May 19, 1995 | Pac-10 championships | Tucson, Arizona | |
| Hammer throw | 78.34 m | Ken Flax | Oregon Ducks | June 7, 1986 | | Indianapolis, Indiana | |
| Hammer throw | 82.56 m PS | (Hungary) Balazs Kiss | USC Trojans | August 23, 1995 | | Veszprém, Hungary | |
| Javelin throw | 89.10 m | (Sweden) Patrik Boden | Texas Longhorns | March 24, 1990 | Texas Quad Meet | Austin, Texas | |
| Javelin throw | 83.28 m | Tom Pukstys | Florida Gators | April 28, 1990 | | Gainesville, Florida | |
| Decathlon | 8961 pts | (Germany) Leo Neugebauer | Texas Longhorns | June 5–6, 2024 | NCAA Division I Championships | Eugene, Oregon | |
| Decathlon | 100m (wind) / Long jump (wind) / Shot put / High jump / 400m / 110m H (wind) / Discus / Pole vault / Javelin / 1500m; 10.64 (+0.1 m/s) / 7.86 m (+0.9 m/s) / 17.46 m / 2.07 m / 48.03 / 14.36 (+0.0 m/s) / 57.70 m / 5.21 m / 56.64 m / 4:44.61 | | | | | | |
| Decathlon | 8720 pts | Kyle Garland | Georgia Bulldogs | May 6–7, 2022 | USATF Combined Events Championships | Fayetteville, Arkansas | |
| 4 × 100 m relay | 37.75 | (Malaysia) Azeem Fahmi (Nigeria) Kayinsola Ajayi (Mexico) Austin Kresley; Tyler Davis | Auburn Tigers | June 10, 2026 | NCAA Division I Championships | Eugene, Oregon | |
| 4 × 100 m relay | 37.93 | Ryan Willie; Jacory Patterson; PJ Austin; Robert Gregory | Florida Gators | May 13, 2023 | SEC Championships | Baton Rouge, Louisiana | |
| 4 × 200 m relay | 1:19.67 | (Jamaica) Lindel Frater (Jamaica) Ricardo Williams; Doc Patton (Saint Kitts and Nevis) Kim Collins | TCU Horned Frogs | April 29, 2000 | Penn Relays | Philadelphia, Pennsylvania | |
| 4 × 200 m relay | 1:20.26 | Joel Andrews 20.9h James Sanford 20.1h Billy Mullins 19.6h Clancy Edwards 19.8h | USC Trojans | May 27, 1978 | Tempe, Arizona | Tempe, Arizona | |
| 4 × 400 m relay | 2:57.74 | (Nigeria) Emmanuel Bamidele; Jacory Patterson (Jamaica) Jevaughn Powell 44.94; Ryan Willie 44.28 | Florida Gators | June 9, 2023 | NCAA Division I Championships | Austin, Texas | |
| 4 × 400 m relay | 2:58.53 | Jacory Patterson 44.4; Ryan Willie 44.5; Jacob Miley 46.0; Champion Allison 43.6 | Florida Gators | April 16, 2022 | Tom Jones Invitational | Gainesville, Florida | |
| 4 × 800 m relay | 7:08.96 | Pete Richardson 1:47.5; Eddie Davis 1:47.8; Treg Scott 1:48.1; Mike Stahr 1:45.6 | Arizona State Sun Devils | April 7, 1984 | Sun Angel Classic | Tempe, Arizona | |
| 4 × 1500 m relay | 14:50.2 | Keith Iovine 3:48.8 (United Kingdom) (United States) Gary Taylor 3:38.6; David Swain 3:41.6 (Republic of Ireland) Paul Donovan 3:41.2 | Arkansas Razorbacks | April 27, 1985 | Penn Relays | Philadelphia, Pennsylvania | |
| 4 × 1500 m relay | 14:53.34 | Rich Kenah 3:48.4; Peter Sherry 3:41.7; Steve Holman 3:40.0; John Trautmann 3:43.2 | Georgetown Hoyas | April 27, 1991 | Penn Relays | Philadelphia, Pennsylvania | |
| 4 × mile relay | 15:51.91 | Sean Donoghue 3:59.32; Charlie O' Donovan 4:00.09; Marco Langon 3:58.18; Liam Murphy 3:54.32 | Villanova Wildcats | April 27, 2024 | Penn Relays | Philadelphia, Pennsylvania | |
| Sprint medley relay (2-2-4-8) | 3:11.94 | Fred Kerley; Elijah Morrow; Mylik Kerley; Devin Dixon | Texas A&M Aggies | April 28, 2017 | SEC Relays | Baton Rouge, Louisiana | |
| Distance medley relay | 9:20.10 | Reuben Reina 2:53.9; Charles Williams 46.4; Robert Bradley 1:46.0; Joe Falcon 3:53.8 | Arkansas Razorbacks | April 28, 1989 | Penn Relays | Philadelphia, Pennsylvania | |
| Shuttle hurdle relay (4 × 110 m) | 53.94 (+2.3 m/s) | Corey Taylor; Fred Townsend; Charles Ryan; Kenneth Ferguson | South Carolina Gamecocks | April 25, 2003 | Penn Relays | Philadelphia, Pennsylvania | |

=== Women ===
| Event | Record | Athlete | Team | Date | Meet | Place | Ref. |
|---|---|---|---|---|---|---|---|
| 100 m | 10.63 (+1.9 m/s) | (British Virgin Islands) Adaejah Hodge | Georgia Bulldogs | June 11, 2026 | NCAA Division I Championships | Eugene, Oregon | |
| 200 m | 21.68 (−0.4 m/s) | (British Virgin Islands) Adaejah Hodge | Georgia Bulldogs | June 13, 2026 | NCAA Division I Championships | Eugene, Oregon | |
| 400 m | 48.79 | (Jamaica) Dejanea Oakley | Georgia Bulldogs | June 13, 2026 | NCAA Division I Championships | Eugene, Oregon | |
| 800 m | 1:56.85 | (The Gambia) Sanu Jallow | Arkansas Razorbacks | June 13, 2026 | NCAA Division I Championships | Eugene, Oregon | |
| 800 m | 1:57.73 | Athing Mu | Texas A&M Aggies | April 17, 2021 (Note: by official result and World Athletics sources; April 16 by USTFCCCA source, probably a typo) | Michael Johnson Invitational | Waco, Texas | |
| 800 m | 1:55.04 PS | Athing Mu | Texas A&M Aggies | August 21, 2021 | Prefontaine Classic | Eugene, Oregon | |
| 1500 m | 3:59.90 | Jenny Barringer | Colorado Buffaloes | June 7, 2009 | Nike Prefontaine Classic | Eugene, Oregon | |
| 1500 m | 3:59.17 PS | Addison Wiley | Huntington Foresters (NAIA) | September 8, 2023 | Memorial Van Damme | Brussels, Belgium | |
| 1500 m | 3:57.95 PS | (Poland) Klaudia Kazimierska | Oregon Ducks | September 16, 2025 | World Championships | Tokyo, Japan | |
| Mile run | 4:29.04 | (Canada) Angela Chalmers | Northern Arizona Lumberjacks | May 16, 1987 | Westwood, California | Westwood, California | |
| Mile run | 4:30.36 | Leann Warren | Oregon Ducks | May 10, 1981 | UCLA-Pepsi Invitational | Westwood, California | |
| Mile run | 4:27.31 PS | Suzy Hamilton | Wisconsin Badgers | August 6, 1989 | Los Angeles, California | Los Angeles, California | |
| 3000 m | 8:37.25 PS | Vicki Huber | Villanova Wildcats | September 25, 1988 | Olympic Games | Seoul, South Korea | |
| 5000 m | 14:50.50 | Jane Hedengren | BYU Cougars | April 17, 2026 (Note: by World Athletics source; April 18, 2026 by USTFCCCA source, probably a typo) | Bryan Clay Invitational | Azusa, California | |
| 10,000 m | 30:46.80 | Jane Hedengren | BYU Cougars | April 3, 2026 | Stanford Invitational | Stanford, California | |
| 100 m hurdles | 12.36 (+2.0 m/s) | Masai Russell | Kentucky Wildcats | April 1, 2023 | Texas Relays | Austin, Texas | |
| 400 m hurdles | 52.46 | (Canada) Savannah Sutherland | Michigan Wolverines | June 14, 2025 | NCAA Division I Championships | Eugene, Oregon | |
| 400 m hurdles | 52.29 PS | Jasmine Jones | USC Trojans | August 8, 2024 | Olympic Games | Paris, France | |
| 3000 m steeplechase | 8:58.15 | (Kenya) Doris Lemngole | Alabama Crimson Tide | 14 June 2025 | NCAA Division I Championships | Eugene, Oregon | |
| 3000 m steeplechase | 9:08.68 | Lexy Halladay-Lowry | BYU Cougars | 14 June 2025 | NCAA Division I Championships | Eugene, Oregon | |
| High jump | 1.99 m | Brigetta Barrett | Arizona Wildcats | May 11, 2013 | Pac-12 Championships | Los Angeles, California | |
| High jump | 2.03 m PS | Brigetta Barrett | Arizona Wildcats | August 11, 2012 | Olympic Games | London, England | |
| Pole vault | 4.84 m | Amanda Moll | Washington Huskies | June 11, 2026 | NCAA Division I Championships | Eugene, Oregon | |
| Pole vault | 4.91 m PS | Hana Moll | Washington Huskies | September 5, 2026 | Memorial Van Damme | Brussels, Belgium | |
| Long jump | 7.14 m (+1.0 m/s) | Tara Davis | Texas Longhorns | March 26, 2021 (Note: March 25, 2021, by USTFCCCA web site) | Texas Relays | Austin, Texas | |
| Triple jump | 14.78 m (+1.3 m/s) | Jasmine Moore | Florida Gators | June 10, 2023 | NCAA Division I Championships | Austin, Texas | |
| Shot put | 20.01 m | Jaida Ross | Oregon Ducks | May 23, 2024 | NCAA West First Round | Fayetteville, Arkansas | |
| Discus throw | 70.22 m | (Netherlands) Jorinde van Klinken | Arizona State Sun Devils | May 23, 2021 | USATF Throws Festival | Tucson, Arizona | |
| Discus throw | 69.39 m | (United States) Jayden Ulrich | Louisville Cardinals | April 13, 2025 | Oklahoma Throws Series World Invitational | Ramona, Oklahoma | |
| Hammer throw | 77.67 m | (Canada) Camryn Rogers | California Golden Bears | June 9, 2022 | NCAA Division I Championships | Eugene, Oregon | |
| Hammer throw | 74.53 | Maggie Ewen | Arizona State Sun Devils | April 6, 2018 | Sun Angel Track Classic | Tempe, Arizona | |
| Javelin throw | 64.19 m | (The Bahamas) Rhema Otabor | Nebraska Cornhuskers | June 6, 2024 | NCAA Division I Championships | Eugene, Oregon | |
| Javelin throw | 62.19 m | Maggie Malone | Texas A&M Aggies | June 9, 2016 | NCAA Division I Championships | Eugene, Oregon | |
| Heptathlon | 6527 pts | (Jamaica) Diane Guthrie | George Mason Patriots | June 2–3, 1995 | NCAA Division I Championships | Knoxville, Tennessee | |
| Heptathlon | 6755 pts PS | Anna Hall | Florida Gators | July 17–18, 2022 | World Championships | Eugene, Oregon | |
| 4 × 100 m relay | 41.55 | (Saint Lucia) Julien Alfred; Ezinne Abba (Republic of Ireland) Rhasidat Adeleke (Jamaica) Kevona Davis | Texas Longhorns | June 8, 2023 | NCAA Division I Championships | Austin, Texas | |
| 4 × 100 m relay | 42.05 | Mikiah Brisco; Kortnei Johnson; Rachel Misher; Aleia Hobbs | LSU Lady Tigers | May 13, 2018 | SEC Championships | Knoxville, Tennessee | |
| 4 × 200 m relay | 1:28.05 | (Republic of Ireland) Rhasidat Adeleke (Saint Lucia) Julien Alfred (Jamaica) Kevona Davis; Lanae Thomas | Texas Longhorns | April 1, 2023 | Texas Relays | Austin, Texas | |
| 4 × 200 m relay | 1:28.78 | Makenzie Dunmore; Hannah Cunliffe; Deajah Stevens; Ariana Washington | Oregon Ducks | April 1, 2017 | Florida Relays | Gainesville, Florida | |
| 4 × 400 m relay | 3:17.96 | (United Kingdom) Amber Anning; Rosey Effiong (Jamaica) Nickisha Pryce; Kaylyn Brown | Arkansas Razorbacks | June 8, 2024 | NCAA Division I Championships | Eugene, Oregon | |
| 4 × 400 m relay | 3:21.93 | Karimah Davis; Dajour Miles; Abby Steiner; Alexis Holmes | Kentucky Wildcats | May 14, 2022 | SEC Championships | Oxford, Mississippi | |
| 4 × 800 m relay | 8:17.28 | Marlena Preigh 2:07.94 (Sweden) Wilma Nielson 2:05.06; Samantha Friborg 2:02.12; Chloe Foerster 2:02.17 | Washington Huskies | April 27, 2024 | Penn Relays | Philadelphia, Pennsylvania | |
| 4 × 800 m relay | 8:17.45 | Kelsey Margey 2:07.04; Angel Piccirillo 2:04.12; Nicky Akande 2:04.04; Emily Lipari 2:02.25 | Villanova Wildcats | April 27, 2013 | Penn Relays | Philadelphia, Pennsylvania | |
| 4 × 1500 m relay | 17:08.34 | Chanelle Price 4:19.5h Phoebe Wright 4:19.0h (United States) (Panama) Rolanda Bell 4:19.6h Sarah Bowman 4:10.2h | Tennessee Volunteers | April 24, 2009 | Penn Relays | Philadelphia, Pennsylvania | |
| Sprint medley relay (2-2-4-8) | 3:36.10 | (Saint Lucia) Julien Alfred (Republic of Ireland) Rhasidat Adeleke; Kennedy Simon; Valery Tobias | Texas Longhorns | March 31, 2023 | Texas Relays | Austin, Texas | |
| Sprint medley relay (2-2-4-8) | 3:39.05 | Makenzie Dunmore; Deajah Stevens; Hannah Waller; Raevyn Rogers | Oregon Ducks | April 29, 2017 | Penn Relays | Philadelphia, Pennsylvania | |
| Distance medley relay | 10:36.82 | Sydney Masciarelli 3:16.35; Delea Martins 53.91; Makayla Paige 2:00.43 (Sweden) Vera Sjöberg 4:26.15 | North Carolina Tar Heels | April 24, 2026 (Note: by official result; April 25, 2026 by USTFCCCA source, probably a typo) | Penn Relays | Philadelphia, Pennsylvania | |
| Distance medley relay | 10:48.38 | Kathy Franey 3:21.0h Michelle Bennett 52.8h Celeste Halliday 2:04.7h Vicki Huber 4:29.9h | Villanova Wildcats | April 28, 1988 | Penn Relays | Philadelphia, Pennsylvania | |

== Indoor ==
=== Men ===
| Event | Record | Athlete | Team | Date | Meet | Place | Ref. |
|---|---|---|---|---|---|---|---|
| 50 m | 5.64 | Davidson Ezinwa | Azusa Pacific Cougars (DII) | February 15, 1992 | | Los Angeles, California | |
| 55 m | 5.99 A | (Barbados) Obadele Thompson | UTEP Miners | February 22, 1997 | WAC Indoor Championships | Colorado Springs, Colorado | |
| 55 m | 6.00 | Lee McRae | Pittsburgh Panthers | March 14, 1986 | | | |
| 60 m | 6.45 | Christian Coleman | Tennessee Volunteers | March 11, 2017 | NCAA Division I Championships | College Station, Texas | |
| 60 m | 6.45 A | (Ghana) Leonard Myles-Mills | BYU Cougars | February 20, 1999 | WAC Indoor Championships | Colorado Springs, Colorado | |
| 60 m | 6.45 | (The Bahamas) Terrence Jones | Texas Tech Red Raiders | January 15, 2022 | Corky Classic | Lubbock, Texas | |
| 60 m | 6.45 | (Nigeria) Kayinsola Ajayi | Auburn Tigers | February 26, 2026 (Note: by World Athletics source; February 28, 2026 by USTFCCCA source, probably a typo) | SEC Championships | College Station, Texas | |
| 60 m | 6.45 | (Nigeria) Kayinsola Ajayi | Auburn Tigers | March 14, 2026 | NCAA Division I Championships | Fayetteville, Arkansas | |
| 200 m | 19.95 | Garrett Kaalund | USC Trojans | March 14, 2026 | NCAA Division I Championships | Fayetteville, Arkansas | |
| 300 m | 31.99 | Jacory Patterson | Florida Gators | January 15, 2022 | Clemson Invitational | Clemson, South Carolina | |
| 400 m | 44.49 | (Canada) Christopher Morales Williams | Georgia Bulldogs | February 24, 2023 | SEC Championships | Fayetteville, Arkansas | |
| 400 m | 44.52 | Michael Norman | USC Trojans | March 10, 2018 | NCAA Division I Championships | College Station, Texas | |
| 500 m | 59.87 | Brian Herron | Texas Longhorns | December 3, 2022 | Commonwealth College Opener | Louisville, Kentucky | |
| 600 y | 1:05.75 | Jenoah McKiver | Florida Gators | January 18, 2025 | Corky Classic | Lubbock, Texas | |
| 600 m | 1:14.79 A | (Kenya) Michael Saruni | UTEP Miners | January 19, 2018 | Martin Luther King Jr. Invitational | Albuquerque, New Mexico | |
| 600 m | 1:14.96 | Isaiah Harris | Penn State Nittany Lions | January 28, 2017 | University Park, Pennsylvania | University Park, Pennsylvania | |
| 800 m | 1:44.70 | Colin Sahlman | Northern Arizona Lumberjacks | February 1, 2026 | Millrose Games | New York City, New York | |
| 1000 y | 2:05.3 h | Don Paige | Villanova Wildcats | February 9, 1979 | Millrose Games | New York, New York | |
| 1000 m | 2:18.05 | Tinoda Matsatsa | Georgetown Hoyas | January 19, 2024 | Hokie Invitational | Blacksburg, Virginia | |
| 1500 m | 3:34.72 | (New Zealand) Sam Tanner | Washington Huskies | February 13, 2021 | New Balance Indoor Grand Prix | Staten Island | |
| 1500 m | 3:35.46 + | Cooper Teare | Oregon Ducks | February 12, 2021 | Tyson Invitational | Fayetteville, Arkansas | |
| Mile | 3:48.32 | Ethan Strand | North Carolina Tar Heels | February 1, 2025 | John Thomas Terrier Classic | Boston, Massachusetts | |
2000 m
| 2000 m | 4:57.81 | (United Kingdom) George Couttie | Virginia Tech Hokies | January 23, 2026 | Hokie Invitational | Blacksburg, Virginia | |
| 2000 m | 5:04.13+ | Parker Wolfe | North Carolina Tar Heels | December 7, 2024 | Sharon Colyear-Danville Season Opener | Boston, Massachusetts | |
| 3000 m | 7:30.15 | Ethan Strand | North Carolina Tar Heels | December 7, 2024 | Sharon Colyear-Danville Opener | Boston, Massachusetts | |
| Two miles | 8:11.47 | (Eritrea) Habtom Samuel | New Mexico Lobos | February 1, 2026 | Millrose Games | New York City, New York | |
| Two miles | 8:23.16 | Ed Eyestone | BYU Cougars | February 2, 1985 | | | |
| 5000 m | 12:57.14 | Nico Young | Northern Arizona Lumberjacks | January 26, 2024 | John Thomas Terrier Classic | Boston, Massachusetts | |
| 50 m hurdles | 6.36 | Renaldo Nehemiah | Maryland Terrapins | February 3, 1979 | Edmonton, Alberta | Edmonton, Alberta | |
| 55 m hurdles | 6.89 | Renaldo Nehemiah | Maryland Terrapins | January 20, 1979 | New York, New York | New York, New York | |
| 60 m hurdles | 7.32 | Ja'Kobe Tharp | Auburn Tigers | March 14, 2026 | NCAA Division I Championships | Fayetteville | |
| High jump | 2.37 m (7 ft 9 in) | Hollis Conway | Louisiana Ragin' Cajuns | March 11, 1989 | NCAA Division I Championships | Indianapolis, Indiana | |
| Pole vault | 6.00 m (19 ft 8 in) | KC Lightfoot | Baylor Bears | February 13, 2021 | Texas Tech Shootout | Lubbock, Texas | |
| Pole vault | 6.00 m (19 ft 8 in) A | (Norway) Sondre Guttormsen | Princeton Tigers | March 10, 2023 | NCAA Division I Championships | Albuquerque, New Mexico | |
| Long jump | 8.59 m (28 ft 2 in) | Miguel Pate | Alabama Crimson Tide | March 1, 2002 | USA Championships | New York, New York | |
| Triple jump | 17.54 m (57 ft 7 in) A | (Jamaica) Jaydon Hibbert | Arkansas Razorbacks | March 11, 2023 | NCAA Division I Championships | Albuquerque, United States | |
| Triple jump | 17.40 m (57 ft 1 in) | Mike Conley | Arkansas Razorbacks | February 22, 1985 | | | |
| Shot put | 21.85 m (71 ft 8 in) | Turner Washington | Arizona State Sun Devils | February 13, 2021 | Texas Tech Shootout | Lubbock, Texas | |
| Weight throw | 25.58 m (83 ft 11 in) | Michael Lihrman | Wisconsin Badgers | February 28, 2015 | Big Ten Indoor Championships | Geneva, Ohio | |
| Pentathlon | 4451 points | Sheldon Blockburger | LSU Tigers | January 1, 1987 | SEC Indoor Championships | Gainesville, Florida | |
| Heptathlon | 6639 pts A | Kyle Garland | Georgia Bulldogs | March 10–11, 2023 | NCAA Division I Championships | Albuquerque, New Mexico | |
| Heptathlon | 60m / Long jump / Shot put / High jump / 60m H / Pole vault / 1000m; 6.87 / 7.96 m / 16.45 m / 2.12 m / 7.74 / 5.16 m / 2:41.36 | | | | | | |
| 4 × 200 m | 1:24.70 | (Zimbabwe) Emunael Mpanduki; Matt Gilmore; Brandon Bennett-Green; Aaron Nadolsky | Penn State Nittany Lions | January 26, 2013 | | University Park, Pennsylvania | |
| 4 × 200 m | 1:24.91 | Carvin Nkanata; Brycen Spratling; Josh Mindlin; Micah Murray | Pittsburgh Panthers | February 11, 2014 | | University Park, Pennsylvania | |
| 4 × 400 m | 3:00.77 WR (Note: Though the time is faster than the current indoor world record, it isn't officially ratified due to the fact that all athletes were not representing the same nation, a technicality enforced by the IAAF. Rai Benjamin has represented Antigua and Barbuda internationally but he is a U.S. citizen born in New York City so the mark stands as the all American-born record.) | Zach Shinnick 46.24 (United States) (Antigua and Barbuda) Rai Benjamin 44.35; Ricky Morgan 45.66; Michael Norman 44.52 | USC Trojans | March 10, 2018 | NCAA Division I Championships | College Station, Texas | |
| 4 × 800 m | 7:17.45 | Mike Radziwinsky 1:51.0; Dave Wittman 1:49.7 (South Africa) Phil Greyling 1:48.5; Terrance Herrington 1:47.7 | Clemson Tigers | March 11, 1989 | NCAA Division I Championships | Indianapolis, Indiana | |
| 4 × 800 m | 7:18.23 | Dedric Jones 1:49.1; Lewis Lacy 1:49.7; Steve Adderley 1:50.0; Scott Peters 1:49.4 | Florida Gators | March 14, 1992 | | Indianapolis, Indiana | |
| 4 × mile relay (Note: 4-miles time is converted to 4x1600 m in USTFCCCA source, shown there as 15:01.5, but this is obviously incorrect. The correct conversion factor is 0.9942 times the 4-mile time, or 16:13.32.) | 16:19.0 h | George MacKay; Don Paige; Mark Belger; Phil Kane | Villanova Wildcats | January 16, 1976 | Dartmouth-USTFF Relays | Hanover, New Hampshire | |
| Sprint medley relay | 3:18.7 h | Michael Calhoun; Darron Witherspoon; Daryl Curry; Earl Jones | Eastern Michigan Eagles | January 28, 1984 | | Kalamazoo, Michigan | |
| Distance medley relay | 9:16.40 WB | (Morocco) Fouad Messaoudi 2:49.49; DeJuana McArthur 46.82 (Qatar) Hafez Mahadi 1:47.27; Ryan Schoppe 3:52.84 | Oklahoma State Cowboys | February 17, 2023 | Arkansas Qualifier | Fayetteville, Arkansas | |
| Distance medley relay | 9:18.81 | Joe Waskom 2:51.34; Daniel Gaik 46.37; Nathan Green 1:46.57; Luke Houser 3:54.54 | Washington Huskies | February 16, 2024 | Arkansas Qualifier | Fayetteville, Arkansas | |

=== Women ===
| Event | Record | Athlete | Team | Date | Meet | Place | Ref. | Video |
|---|---|---|---|---|---|---|---|---|
| 50 m | 6.13 | Jeanette Bolden | UCLA Bruins | February 21, 1981 | | Edmonton, Alberta | | |
| 55 m | 6.56 | Gwen Torrence | Georgia Bulldogs | March 14, 1987 | NCAA Division I Championships | Oklahoma City, Oklahoma | | |
| 60 m | 6.94 A | (Saint Lucia) Julien Alfred | Texas Longhorns | March 11, 2023 | NCAA Division I Championships | Albuquerque, New Mexico | | |
| 60 m | 7.04 A | Jacious Sears | Tennessee Volunteers | March 10, 2023 | NCAA Division I Championships | Albuquerque, New Mexico | | |
| 200 m | 22.01 A | (Saint Lucia) Julien Alfred | Texas Longhorns | March 11, 2023 | NCAA Division I Championships | Albuquerque, New Mexico | | |
| 200 m | 22.09 | Abby Steiner | Kentucky Wildcats | February 26, 2022 | Southeastern Conference Championships | College Station, Texas, United States | | |
| 300 y | 32.63 | (Jamaica) Merlene Ottey | Nebraska Cornhuskers | March 13, 1982 | AIAW Indoor Championships | Cedar Falls, Iowa | | |
| 300 y | 33.54 | Gwen Torrence | Georgia Bulldogs | March 1, 1986 | SEC Indoor Track and Field Championships | Baton Rouge, Louisiana | | |
| 300 m | 35.80 | Abby Steiner | Kentucky Wildcats | December 11, 2021 | Cardinal Classic | Louisville, Kentucky | | |
| 400 m | 49.24 | Isabella Whittaker | Arkansas Razorbacks | March 15, 2025 | NCAA Division I Championships | Virginia Beach, Virginia | | |
| 500 m | 1:08.40 | (Canada) Sage Watson | Arizona Wildcats | February 4, 2017 | Armory Track Invitational | New York, New York | | |
| 500 m | 1:09.16 | Francena McCorory | Hampton Lady Pirates | January 27, 2007 | | University Park, Pennsylvania | | |
| 600 y | 1:16.76 A | Michaela Rose | LSU Lady Tigers | January 20, 2024 | Corky Classic | Lubbock, Texas | | |
| 600 m | 1:25.16 | Britton Wilson | Arkansas Razorbacks | January 13, 2023 | Arkansas Invitational | Fayetteville, Arkansas | | |
| 800 m | 1:58.40 | Athing Mu | Texas A&M Aggies | February 27, 2021 (Note: February 25 by USTFCCCA source, a typo) | Southeastern Conference Championships | Fayetteville, Arkansas | | |
| 1000 m | 2:37.72 | Sophia Gorriaran | Harvard Crimson | February 22, 2026 | Saucony Battle for Boston | Boston, Massachusetts | | |
| 1500 m | 4:01.60+ | (Sweden) Wilma Nielson | Oregon Ducks | February 14, 2026 | BU David Hemery Valentine Invitational | Boston, Massachusetts | | |
| 1500 m | 4:03.01+ | Riley Chamberlain | BYU Cougars | February 14, 2026 | BU David Hemery Valentine Invitational | Boston, Massachusetts | | |
| Mile run | 4:20.61 | Riley Chamberlain | BYU Cougars | February 14, 2026 | BU David Hemery Valentine Invitational | Boston, Massachusetts | | |
| 3000 m | 8:31.39 | (Kenya) Doris Lemngole | Alabama Crimson Tide | February 1, 2026 | Millrose Games | New York City, New York | | |
| 3000 m | 8:34.98 | Jane Hedengren | BYU Cougars | February 1, 2026 | Millrose Games | New York City, New York | | |
| 5000 m | 14:44.79 | Jane Hedengren | BYU Cougars | December 6, 2025 | BU Season Opener | Boston, Massachusetts | | |
| 55 m hurdles | 7.30 A | Tiffany Lott | BYU Cougars | February 20, 1997 | Colorado Springs, Colorado | Colorado Springs, Colorado | | |
| 60 m hurdles | 7.72 A | (Jamaica) Ackera Nugent | Arkansas Razorbacks | March 10, 2023 | NCAA Division I Championships | Albuquerque, New Mexico | | |
| 60 m hurdles | 7.75 | Masai Russell | Kentucky Wildcats | January 20, 2023 | Red Raider Open | Lubbock, Texas | | |
| High jump | 2.00 m (6 ft 7 in) | (Jamaica) Lamara Distin | Texas A&M Aggies | February 24, 2024 | SEC Championships | Fayetteville, Arkansas | | |
| High jump | 2.00 m (6 ft 7 in) | Rachel Glenn | Arkansas Razorbacks | March 9, 2024 | NCAA Division I Championship | Boston, Massachusetts | | |
| Pole vault | 4.91 m (16 ft 1 in) | Amanda Moll | Washington Huskies | February 28, 2025 (Note: by World Athletics source; March 1, 2025 by USTFCCCA source, a typo) | Big 10 Championships | Indianapolis, Indiana | | |
| Long jump | 7.03 m (23 ft 1 in) A | Jasmine Moore | Florida Gators | March 10, 2023 | NCAA Division I Championships | Albuquerque, New Mexico | | |
| Triple jump | 15.12 m (49 ft 7 in) A | Jasmine Moore | Florida Gators | March 11, 2023 | NCAA Division I Championships | Albuquerque, New Mexico | | |
| Shot put | 19.57 m (64 ft 2 in) A | (Netherlands) Jorinde van Klinken | Oregon Ducks | February 11, 2023 | Don Kirby Elite Invitational | Albuquerque, New Mexico | | |
| Shot put | 19.75 m (64 ft 10 in) PS | (Sweden) Axelina Johansson | Nebraska Cornhuskers | March 20, 2026 | World Championships | Toruń, Poland | | |
| Shot put | 19.56 m (64 ft 2 in) | Raven Saunders | Ole Miss Rebels | March 10, 2017 | NCAA Division I Championships | College Station, Texas | | |
| Weight throw | 25.56 m (83 ft 10 in) | Brittany Riley | Southern Illinois Salukis | March 10, 2007 | NCAA Division I Championships | Fayetteville, Arkansas | | |
| Pentathlon | 4746 | (Trinidad and Tobago) Tyra Gittens | Texas A&M Aggies | March 11, 2021 | NCAA Division I Championships | Fayetteville, Arkansas | | |
| Pentathlon | 4703 | Kendell Williams | Georgia Bulldogs | March 11, 2016 | | | | |
| 4 × 200 m relay | 1:35.65 | Megan Osborne; Kiah Seymour; Dynasty McGee; Mahagony Jones | Penn State Nittany Lions | January 11, 2014 | Penn State Relays | State College, Pennsylvania | | |
| 4 × 400 m relay | 3:21.75 A | (England) Amber Anning 51.47 (Jamaica) Joanne Reid 50.52; Rosey Effiong 50.57; Britton Wilson 49.20 | Arkansas Razorbacks | March 11, 2023 | NCAA Division I Championships | Albuquerque, New Mexico | | |
| 4 × 400 m relay | 3:27.42 A | Briana Nelson 53.00; Courtney Okolo 51.22; Kendall Baisden 52.22; Ashley Spencer 50.98 | Texas Longhorns | March 15, 2014 | Albuquerque, New Mexico | Albuquerque, New Mexico | | |
| 4 × 400 m relay | 3:28.25 | Tiffany Ross 54.1h Miki Barber 51.0h Demetria Washington 51.8h Lashinda Demus 51.4h | South Carolina Gamecocks | March 15, 2003 | Fayetteville, Arkansas | Fayetteville, Arkansas | | |
| 4 × 800 m relay | 8:25.5 h | Gina Procaccio 2:05.6; Debbie Grant 2:04.5; Michelle DiMuro 2:09.9; Celeste Halliday 2:05.5 | Villanova Wildcats | February 7, 1987 | | Gainesville, Florida | | |
| Sprint medley relay | 3:52.25 | Lauren Burns 25.0h Leena Bettis 25.27; Alesha Barber 55.6h Briene Simmons 2:06.0h | Penn State Nittany Lions | January 13, 2007 | | University Park, Pennsylvania | | |
| Distance medley relay | 10:43.39 | Chloe Foerster 3:15.29; Anna Terrell 54.74; Marlena Preigh 2:03.34 (Australia) Carley Thomas 4:30.02 | Washington Huskies | February 16, 2024 | BU Terrier DMR Challenge | Boston, Massachusetts | | |
| Distance medley relay | 10:50.98 | Phoebe Wright 3:23.18; Brittany Jones 53.51; Chanelle Price 2:03.18; Sarah Bowman 4:31.11 | Tennessee Volunteers | March 13, 2009 | | College Station, Texas | | |
