= South Carolina Gamecocks =

Intercollegiate sports teams of the University of South Carolina

- University: University of South Carolina
- Nickname: Gamecocks
- NCAA: Division I (FBS)
- Conference: SEC (primary); Sun Belt (men's soccer); Big 12 (beach volleyball)
- Athletic director: Jeremiah Donati
- Location: Columbia, South Carolina
- Varsity teams: 21 (9 men's, 12 women's)
- Football stadium: Williams–Brice Stadium
- Basketball arena: Colonial Life Arena
- Baseball stadium: Founders Park
- Softball stadium: Carolina Softball Stadium
- Soccer stadium: Eugene E. Stone III Stadium
- Tennis venue: Carolina Tennis Center
- Volleyball arena: Carolina Volleyball Center
- Other venues: Wheeler Beach (beach volleyball)
- Colors: Garnet and black
- Mascot: Cocky (official); Sir Big Spur (live); Big Spur (previous)
- Fight song: "The Fighting Gamecocks Lead the Way"
- Website: gamecocksonline.com

SEC logo in South Carolina's colors

The South Carolina Gamecocks represent the University of South Carolina in the NCAA Division I. It is the flagship school in the state of South Carolina.

All of the university's varsity teams compete at the Division I level of the NCAA, and all but men's soccer and women's beach volleyball compete in the Southeastern Conference. Men's soccer competes in the Sun Belt Conference and women's beach volleyball competes in the Big 12 Conference because the SEC does not sponsor those sports.

The University of South Carolina's athletic program has built a notable legacy across a range of sports. Gamecock teams have claimed nine national championships, with the most prominent titles coming in baseball (2010, 2011) and women's basketball (2017, 2022, 2024). The football program, while never winning a national championship, has notable achievements including the 1969 ACC title, the 2010 SEC East Division title, and the 1980 Heisman Trophy won by George Rogers. In addition to team success, the university has produced Olympians and professional athletes across multiple sports, particularly through its track and field and basketball programs.

Beyond the competition, Gamecock fans are celebrated for their loyalty and enthusiasm. Home venues such as Williams–Brice Stadium, Colonial Life Arena, and Founders Park regularly rank among the nation’s leaders in attendance, reflecting the community pride that surrounds the program. Sportscaster Tim Brando was quoted as saying, "You won't find any more loyal fans in the country than those who follow the South Carolina Gamecocks."

== Athletics history ==
=== Nickname and colors ===
"Garnet and Black" have been used by the University of South Carolina as its colors ever since the family of J. William Flinn presented a banner composed of those colors to the football team in November 1895, although there was no official adoption of the colors at that time. In 1900, the football team was first referred to as the "Gamecocks" by The State newspaper. The nickname was a reference to the fighting tactics of General Thomas Sumter, the Revolutionary War hero known as the Fighting Gamecock. Given that garnet and black were already in use and also the dominant colors on a gamecock, the university gradually adopted "Gamecocks" and "garnet and black" as the official nickname and colors for its athletic teams.

=== Conference history ===
The University of South Carolina was a member of the Southern Conference for men's basketball and football from 1922 until it became a founding member of the Atlantic Coast Conference in 1953. The Gamecocks officially withdrew from the ACC on June 30, 1971, the result of football head coach Paul Dietzel opposing a conference rule that required a minimum 800 Scholastic Aptitude Test (SAT) score when awarding athletic scholarships.

USC then competed as an independent until 1983 when it joined the Metro Conference for all sports except football (which the Metro did not sponsor) and men's soccer. In 1991, the Gamecocks joined the Southeastern Conference when it increased its membership to 12 schools and split into two divisions. The Gamecocks were part of the league's East Division until the conference did away with divisions with their latest expansion to 16 schools in 2024.

Men's soccer continued to compete as an independent since the SEC does not sponsor men's soccer, but joined the Metro Conference for the 1993 and 1994 seasons and competed in Conference USA from 2005 to 2021. After that season, South Carolina, along with fellow SEC member Kentucky (the only other SEC member with varsity men's soccer), moved that sport to the Sun Belt Conference. Women's beach volleyball competed as an independent before joining the Coastal Collegiate Sports Association for the 2016 season (2015–16 school year).

== Sports sponsored ==
Men's sports	Women's sports
Baseball	Basketball
Basketball	Beach volleyball
Football	Cross country
Golf	Equestrian
Soccer	Golf
Swimming & diving	Soccer
Tennis	Softball
Track & field^{1}	Swimming & diving
	Tennis
	Track & field^{1}
	Volleyball
^{1} – includes both indoor and outdoor.

South Carolina sponsors team in 9 men's and 12 women's NCAA sanctioned sports. All programs compete in the Southeastern Conference with the exception of the men's soccer program which competes in the Sun Belt Conference and the women's beach volleyball program competes in the Coastal Collegiate Sports Association.

=== Baseball ===
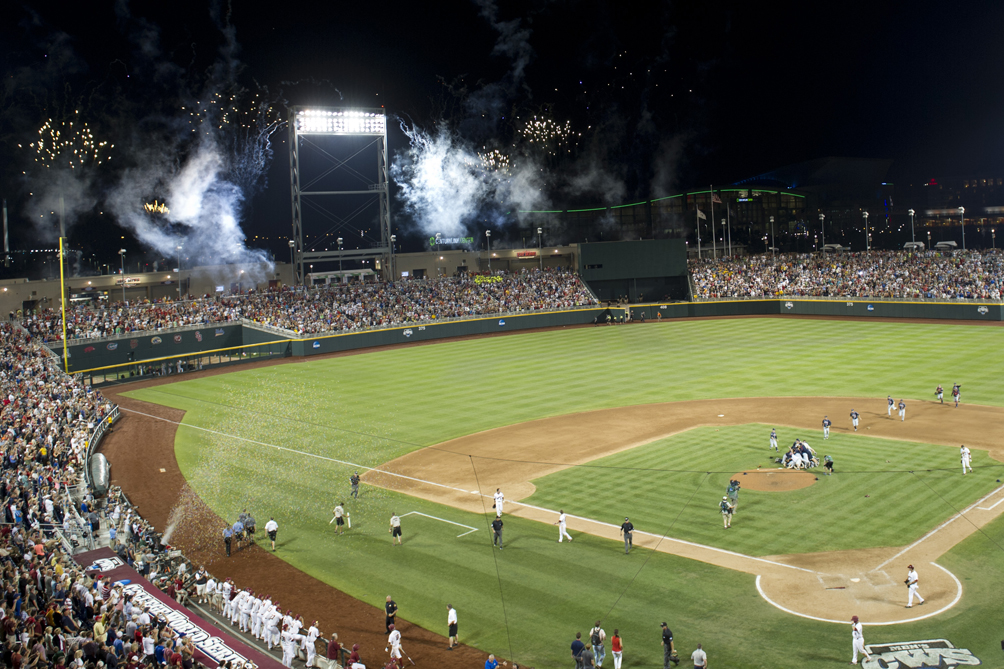
South Carolina game in 2012

The baseball team represents the University of South Carolina in NCAA Division I college baseball. South Carolina has posted 29 NCAA Tournament appearances, 11 College World Series berths, and two National Championships: 2010 and 2011. Since joining the Southeastern Conference in 1992, the team has competed in the Eastern division, where they have won seven divisional titles, three regular season conference championships (2000, 2002, 2011) and one SEC Tournament championship (2004).

Monte Lee is the current head coach. Between 2010 and 2012 the Gamecocks set two NCAA records for postseason success: the most consecutive NCAA tournament wins (22) and the most consecutive wins in the College World Series (12). The team plays its home games at Carolina Stadium (Founders Park), which opened on February 21, 2009.

=== Men's basketball ===
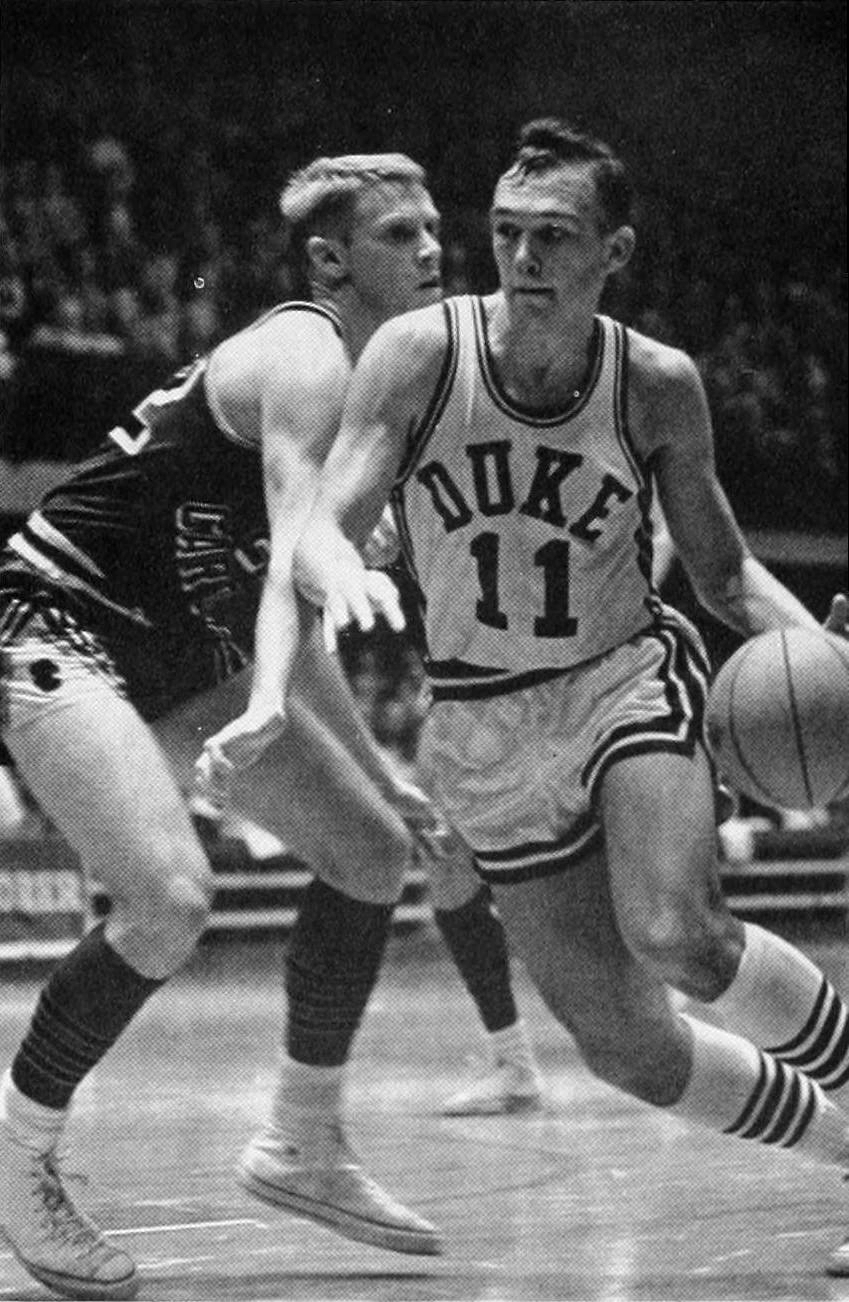
South Carolina at Duke in 1965

The men's basketball team represents the University of South Carolina and competes in the Southeastern Conference (SEC). The Gamecocks won Southern Conference titles in 1927, 1933, 1934, and 1945, and then they gained national attention under hall of fame coach Frank McGuire, posting a 205–65 record from 1967 to 1976, which included the 1970 Atlantic Coast Conference (ACC) championship, 1971 ACC Tournament title, and four consecutive NCAA tournament appearances from 1971 to 1974.

The program also won the 1997 SEC championship, National Invitation Tournament (NIT) titles in 2005 and 2006, and a share of the 2009 SEC Eastern division title. Most recently, the Gamecocks won the 2017 NCAA East Regional Championship, reaching the Final Four for the first time in school history. Lamont Paris is the current head coach, and the team plays at the 18,000-seat Colonial Life Arena.

=== Women's basketball ===
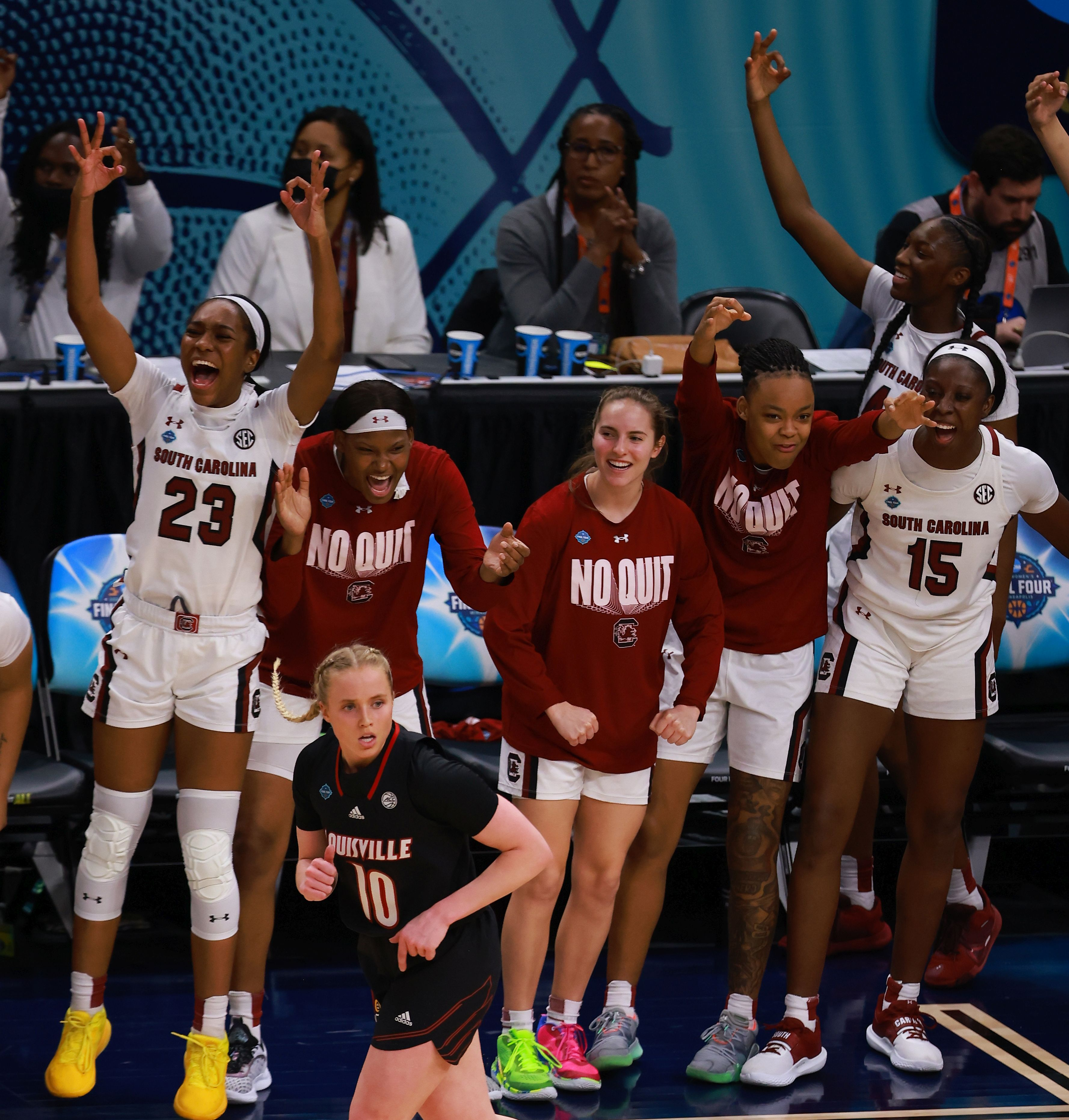
South Carolina players celebrating in 2022

The South Carolina Gamecocks women's basketball team represents the University of South Carolina and competes in the Southeastern Conference. During the 1980s, the Gamecocks won five regular season Metro Conference championships and three conference tournament championships. Under their current head coach, 3-time olympic gold medalist Dawn Staley, the program continues to build on their accomplishments, winning the SEC regular season championship 4 years in a row (2014–2017) and the SEC tournament championship 3 years in a row twice (2015–2017, 2023-2025). They have become one of the most dominant programs in the country.

Under Staley, the Gamecocks have earned a #1 seed in the NCAA Tournament 4 consecutive seasons (2014–2017). The 2015 season also saw the team win its first out of two NCAA regional championships (2015, 2017) and advance to the Final Four for the first time in school history. The Gamecocks won the 2017, 2022 NCAA Division I women's basketball tournament, and 2024 NCAA Division I tournament National Championships. The Gamecocks share a home with the South Carolina men's basketball team at the 18,000-seat Colonial Life Arena.

=== Football ===
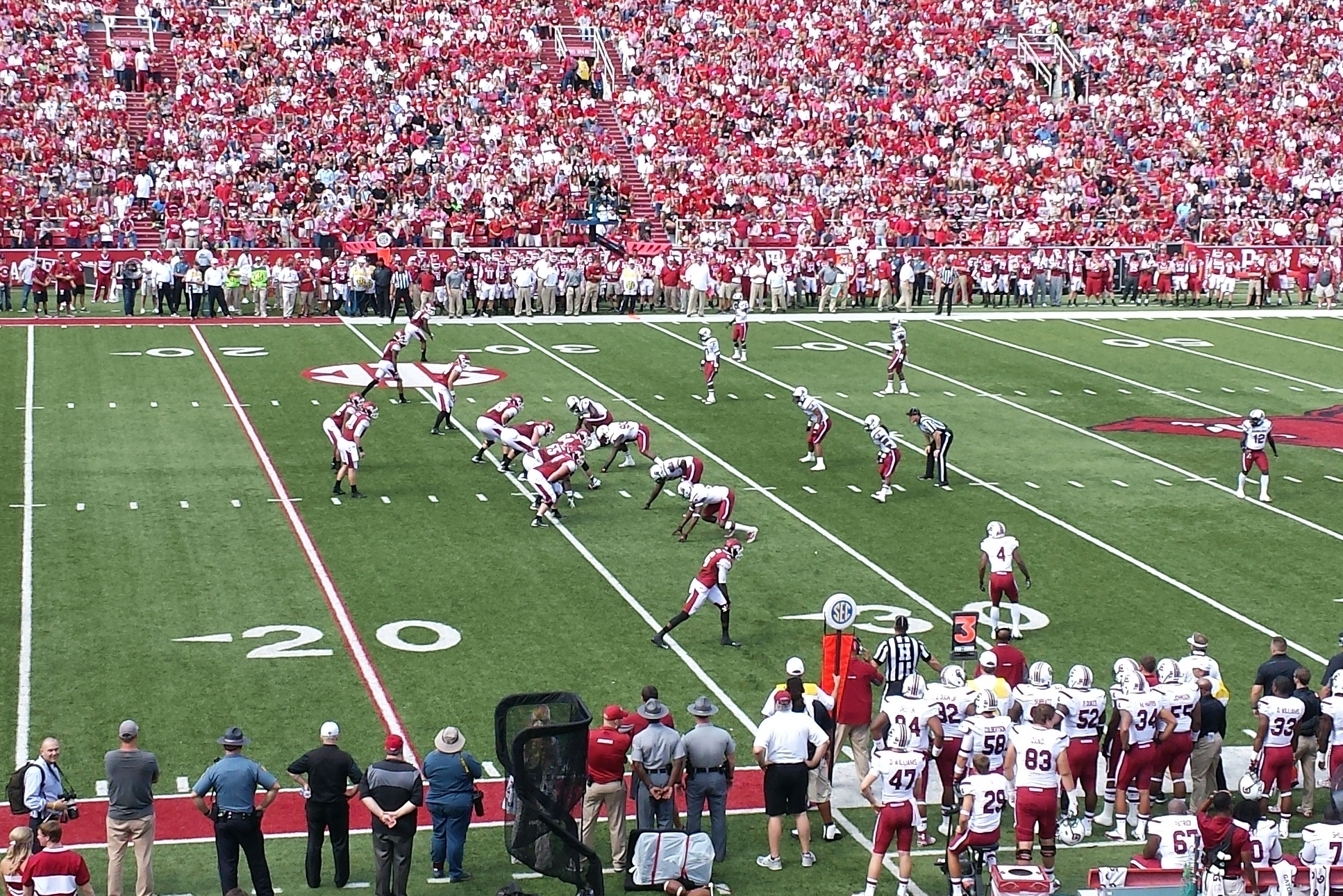
South Carolina at Arkansas in 2013

The football team represents the University of South Carolina and competes in the Football Bowl Subdivision of the NCAA and the Eastern Division of the Southeastern Conference. The team plays its home games at Williams-Brice Stadium, the 20th largest stadium in college football.

Accomplishments include the 2010 SEC East title, the 1969 ACC championship, and numerous bowl victories and top 25 rankings. In 1980, George Rogers won the Heisman Trophy. Players inducted into the College Football Hall of Fame include George Rogers and Sterling Sharpe. The current head coach is Shane Beamer.

=== Women's track and field ===
The South Carolina Gamecocks women's track and field team represents the University of South Carolina and competes in the SEC, where they have won three conference championships (1999, 2002, 2005). The team has been coached by Curtis Frye since 1997, won the 2002 NCAA Women's Division I Outdoor Track and Field Championship, and includes many Olympic medalists, such as Aleen Bailey, Natasha Hastings, and Tonique Williams-Darling.

† ordered by revenue contribution to USC Athletic Department in FY2012.

== Notable non-varsity sports ==
=== Club Rugby ===
Founded in 1967, the University of South Carolina rugby team is the oldest club sport at the school. The team plays Division 1 college rugby in the Southeastern Collegiate Rugby Conference against its SEC rivals. The rugby team finished second in the SCRC conference in 2013 and reached the national playoffs. The team improved and finished first in the SCRC conference in 2014, again qualifying for the national playoffs.

South Carolina rugby offers scholarships to certain athletes of up to $60,000 over a four-year period. The rugby team is supported by the Carolina Rugby Foundation and by the Carolina Men's Rugby Endowment Fund. The rugby team has been led since 2011 by head coach Mark Morris.

=== Club Ice Hockey ===
The South Carolina Club Hockey team, nicknamed "Cock Hockey", is the schools non-varsity men's ice hockey club founded in 2001 by John Lipscomb and Jared Hopkins. Today, the club competes in Division I of College Hockey South (CHS), the non-varsity Amateur Athletic Union (AAU). In 2024, the team won the Division I AAU National Championship, beating Buffalo 4-1 after they upset No. 1 seed Tampa 6-4.

The South Carolina Women's Club Hockey was created as a founding member of the College Hockey South women's division in 2023.

=== Men's Club Lacrosse ===
The Gamecocks Men's Club Lacrosse team won the MCLA Division 1 National Championships in 2019 and 2022.

=== Club Baseball ===
Founded in 2015, the South Carolina Club Baseball team competes in Division 1 of the National Club Baseball Association. The team finished first in the South Atlantic Conference's Eastern Region in 2020 and 2022. In 2020, then-school president Robert Caslen recognized the team, and pledged to host an ice cream party for the team as a reward for sweeping rival Clemson University in a two-game series in Columbia.

=== Club Boxing ===
Club Boxing, founded in 2016 hosts a yearly tournament among students at South Carolina and Clemson. They also host sparring events with other local universities and gyms.

== Titles, coaches, and facilities ==
The Gamecocks have won thirteen national team championships: 2017, 2022, and 2024 NCAA Championships in women's basketball; 2010 & 2011 NCAA Championships in baseball; 2002 NCAA Championship in women's outdoor track & field; 2005, 2007, 2015, and 2026 National Championships in women's equestrian; and 2005, 2006, and 2007 Hunt Seat National Championships in women's equestrian. Also, the men's and women's track & field teams have produced many NCAA individual champions, world championship medalists, and Olympic medalists. The baseball and basketball teams have also produced Olympic medalists.

Other significant accomplishments include 2010 SEC Eastern Division Champions in football, NCAA runner-up four times in women's track & field (2000, 2001, 2003, 2005), NCAA runner-up four times in baseball (1975, 1977, 2002, 2012), 1993 NCAA runner-up in men's soccer, 2005 & 2006 NIT champions in men's basketball, and the 1980 Heisman Trophy winner George Rogers.

The University of South Carolina maintains a range of modern athletic facilities that rank among the best in collegiate sports. The Long Family Football Operations Center, a 110,000-square-foot complex, houses advanced training, recovery, and nutrition areas for the football program. Williams–Brice Stadium, known for its energetic atmosphere, has undergone major renovations featuring upgraded suites and video displays. Other notable venues include the Rice Athletics Center, which serves as the administrative hub for athletics, and a 17-acre golf practice facility. These investments reflect the university’s ongoing commitment to athlete development, performance, and the overall fan experience.

Sport		Titles	Current Head Coach (since)	Venue
Baseball		SEC East Champions: 7 (2016, 2012, 2011, 2003, 2002, 2000, 1999); SEC Champions: 3 (2011, 2002, 2000); SEC Tournament Champions: 1 (2004); NCAA Tournament Appearances: 32; College World Series: 11; NCAA Runner-Up: 4 (2012, 2002, 1977, 1975); NCAA Champions: 2 (2011, 2010); Olympic Medalists: 1 (2000)	Paul Mainieri (2024)	Founders Park
Basketball	Men's	Southern Conference Champions: 4 (1945, 1934, 1933, 1927); Southern Conference tournament Champions: 1 (1933); ACC Tournament Runner-Up: 2 (1970, 1957); ACC Tournament Champions: 1 (1971); SEC East Champions: 2 (2009, 1997); SEC Champions: 1 (1997); SEC Tournament Runner-Up: 2 (2006, 1998); NIT Champions: 2 (2006, 2005); NCAA Tournament Appearances: 9 NCAA Final Four: 1 (2017); Olympic Medalists: 1 (1972)	Lamont Paris (2022)	Colonial Life Arena
Basketball	Women's	NWIT Champions: 1 (1979); Metro Conference Champions: 5 (1986, 1988, 1989, 1990, 1991); Metro Conference tournament Champions: 3 (1986, 1988, 1989); SEC Champions: 7 (2014, 2015, 2016, 2017, 2020, 2022, 2023); SEC Tournament Champions: 6 (2015, 2016, 2017, 2018, 2020, 2021, 2023); AIAW Tournament Appearances: 4 AIAW Final Four: 1 (1980, 3rd place); NCAA Tournament Appearances: 18; NCAA Final Four: 6 (2015, 2017, 2021, 2022, 2023, 2024); NCAA Championship: 3 (2017, 2022, 2024); Olympic Medalists: 1 (2004)	Dawn Staley (2008)	Colonial Life Arena
Women's Cross country		Metro Conference Champions: 3 (1990, 1989, 1988)	Tim Hall (2023)	
Women's Equestrian		SEC Champions: 3 (2014, 2013, 2025); NCEA Hunt Seat National Champions: 3 (2007, 2006, 2005); NCEA National Champions: 4 (2026, 2015, 2007, 2005)	Carol Gwin (2024)	One Wood Farm
Football		Southern Conference Champions: 1 (1933); ACC Champions: 1 (1969); SEC East Champions: 1 (2010); Bowl Appearances: 23 (9–14 record); Heisman Trophies: 1 (1980 – George Rogers)	Shane Beamer (2020)	Williams-Brice Stadium
Golf	Men's	ACC Runner-Up: 1 (1968); ACC Champions: 1 (1964); Metro Conference Individual Champions: 2 (1991, 1990); Metro Conference Runner-Up: 5 (1990, 1989, 1988, 1986, 1984); Metro Conference Champions: 1 (1991); SEC Individual Champions: 2 (2015, 1998); SEC Runner-Up: 4 (2015, 2013, 2008, 1998); NCAA Tournament Appearances: 26; NCAA Regional Individual Champions: 2 (2001 West, 1999 East); NCAA Regional Champions: 1 (2007 West)	Rob Bradley (2024)	Cobblestone Park
Golf	Women's	Metro Conference Individual Champions: 1 (1989); Metro Conference Champions: 1 (1990); SEC Individual Champions: 2 (2002, 2001); SEC Runner-Up: 1 (2015); SEC Champions: 2 (2002, 2025); NCAA Tournament Appearances: 24; NCAA Regional Individual Champions: 3 (2017 Columbus, 2010 East, 2008 East, 1995 East); NCAA Regional Champions: 5 (2017 Columbus, 2016, 2015 East, 2012 East, 2010 East)	Kalen Anderson (2007)	Cobblestone Park
Soccer	Men's	Metro Conference Champions: 1 (1993); Conference USA Champions: 1 (2011); Conference USA Tournament Champions: 2 (2010, 2005); NCAA Tournament Appearances: 20; NCAA Runner-Up: 1 (1993)	Tony Annan (2021)	Stone Stadium (The Graveyard)
Soccer	Women's	SEC Champions: 3 (2011, 2016, 2017); SEC Tournament Champions: 3 (2009, 2019, 2022); NCAA Tournament Appearances: 8	Shelley Smith (2001)	Stone Stadium (The Graveyard)
Beach Volleyball		NCAA Tournament Appearances: 1	Jose Loiola (2025)	Carolina Beach Volleyball Complex
Softball		SEC East Champions: 4 (2002, 2001, 1999, 1997); SEC Champions: 1 (1997); SEC Tournament Champions: 2 (2000, 1997); NCAA Tournament Appearances: 18	Ashley Chastain (2024)	Beckham Field
Swimming & Diving	Men's	ACC Individual Champions: 8 Metro Conference Champions: 8 (1991, 1990, 1989, 1988, 1987, 1986, 1985, 1984); Metro Conference Individual Champions: 8 SEC Individual Champions: 5 NCAA Tournament Appearances: 30	Jeff Poppell (2021)	The Carolina Natatorium
Swimming & Diving	Women's	Metro Conference Champions: 6 (1990, 1989, 1988, 1986, 1985, 1984); Metro Conference Individual Champions: 4 SEC Individual Champions: 12; NCAA Tournament Appearances: 30; NCAA Individual Champions: 2 (2004 – Allison Brennan) (2026 - Sophie Verzl)	Jeff Poppell (2021)	The Carolina Natatorium
Tennis	Men's	ACC Champions: 1 (1968); ACC Tournament Champions: 1 (1968); Metro Conference Individual Champions: 3 Metro Conference tournament Champions: 6 (1991, 1990, 1989, 1987, 1986, 1985); NCAA Tournament Appearances: 22; NCAA Individual Champions: 1 (2019 – Paul Jubb)	Josh Goffi (2010)	Carolina Tennis Stadium
Tennis	Women's	Metro Conference tournament Champions: 5 (1990, 1988, 1987, 1986, 1985); SEC Tournament Champions: 1 (2019); NCAA Tournament Appearances: 29	Kevin Epley (2012)	Carolina Tennis Stadium
Track and Field	Men's	ACC Individual Champions: 16 (indoor), 33 (outdoor); Metro Conference Individual Champions: 32 (outdoor); SEC Individual Champions: 23 (indoor), 26 (outdoor); NCAA Tournament Appearances: 20 (indoor), 25 (outdoor); NCAA Individual Champions: 8 (indoor), 10 (outdoor); Olympic Medalists: 5	Tim Hall (2023)	Weems Baskin Track Facility
Track and Field	Women's	Metro Conference Individual Champions: 5 (outdoor); SEC Individual Champions: 22 (indoor), 46 (outdoor); SEC Outdoor Champions: 3 (2005, 2002, 1999); NCAA Tournament Appearances: 19 (indoor), 20 (outdoor); NCAA Individual Champions: 14 (indoor), 14 (outdoor); NCAA Indoor Runner-Up: 3 (2003, 2001, 2000); NCAA Outdoor Runner-Up: 1 (2005); NCAA Outdoor Champions: 1 (2002); Olympic Medalists: 5	Tim Hall (2023)	Weems Baskin Track Facility
Women's volleyball		Metro Conference tournament Champions: 1 (1984); NCAA Tournament Appearances: 7	Sarah Noble (2025)	Volleyball Competition Facility

== Gamecocks in the Olympics ==
Baseball

- Adam Everett (2000, United States, Shortstop, Gold Medal)

Men's Basketball

- Kevin Joyce (1972, United States, Guard, Silver Medal)
- Marijonas Petravicius (2008, Lithuanian, Center)

Women's Basketball

- Laeticia Amihere (2020, Canada)
- Ilona Burgrova (2012, Czech Republic, Center)
- Allisha Gray (2020, United States, 3x3)
- Shannon Johnson (2004, United States, Point Guard, Gold Medal)
- Iva Sliskovic (2012, Croatia)
- A'ja Wilson (2020, United States)

Men's Swimming & Diving

- Alex Alexander (1964, Australia, Individual Medley)
- Jean-Marie Arnould (1988, Belgium, Freestyle)
- István Batházi (1996, 2000, & 2004; Hungary; Individual Medley)
- Tamas Batházi (2004, Hungary)
- Gary Binfield (1988, Great Britain)
- Javier Botello (2000, Spain)
- Zsolt Gaspar (2000 & 2004, Hungary, Butterfly)
- Rik Leishman (1992, Great Britain, Butterfly)
- Tamás Szűcs (2004, Hungary, Freestyle)
- Akaram Mahmoud (2016, Egypt, Freestyle)

Women's Swimming & Diving

- Vivian Alberty (1996, Puerto Rico, Diving)
- Isabelle Arnould (1988, Belgium, Freestyle)
- Shelly Cramer (1976 & 1980, Virgin Islands)
- Michelle Davison (2000, United States, Diving)
- Sharntelle McLean (2004 & 2008, Trinidad and Tobago, Freestyle)
- Anna Nyiry (1996, Hungary)
- Tracey Richardson (2004, Great Britain, 3 Meter Springboard)
- Heather Roffey (2004, Cayman Islands, Freestyle & Butterfly)
- Julia Vincent (2016, South Africa, 3 Meter Springboard)

Men's Track & Field

- Leroy Dixon (2008, United States, 4 × 100 Meter Relay)
- Adrian Durant (2004; Virgin Islands; 100 Meters, 200 Meters, & 4 × 100 Meter Relay)
- Otis Harris (2004, United States; 400 Meters, Silver Medal; 4 × 400 Meter Relay, Gold Medal)
- Rodney Martin (2008, United States, 4 × 100 Meter Relay)
- Jason Richardson (2012, United States, 110 Meter Hurdles, Silver Medal)
- Brad Snyder (1996, 2000, & 2004; Canada; Shot Put)
- Terrence Trammell (2000, 2004, & 2008; United States; 110 Meter Hurdles; 2000 & 2004 Silver Medals)
- Marvin Watts (2000, Jamaica, 800 Meters)
- Quincy Hall (2024, United States, 400m, Gold Medal)

Women's Track & Field

- Aliyah Abrams (2016, Guyana, 400 Meters)
- Aleen Bailey (2004 & 2008, Jamaica, 4 × 100 Meter Relay, 2004 Gold Medal)
- Miki Barber (2000, United States, 4 × 400 Meter Relay)
- Kierre Beckles (2016, Barbados, 100 Meter Hurdles)
- Lashinda Demus (2004 & 2012, United States, 400 Meter Hurdles, 2012 Silver Medal)
- Dawn Ellerbe (2000, United States, Hammer Throw)
- Michelle Fournier (2000 & 2004, Canada, Hammer Throw)
- Chelsea Hammond (2008, Jamaica, Long Jump)
- Natasha Hastings (2008, 2012, & 2016, United States, 4 × 400 Meter Relay, 2008 Gold Medal)
- Charmaine Howell (2000, Jamaica, 4 × 400 Meter Relay, Silver Medal)
- Mechelle Lewis (2008, United States, 4 × 100 Meter Relay)
- Lisa Misipeka (1996, 2000, & 2004, American Samoa, Hammer Throw & Shot Put)
- Jeannelle Scheper (2016, St. Lucia, High Jump)
- Shevon Stoddart (2004 & 2008, Jamaica, 400 Meter Hurdles)
- Tiffany Williams (2008, United States, 400 Meter Hurdles)
- Tonique Williams-Darling (2000 & 2004, The Bahamas, 400 Meters, 2004 Gold Medal)

== Championships ==
=== NCAA team championships ===
South Carolina has won 6 NCAA team national championships.

- Men's (2)
  - Baseball (2): 2010, 2011
- Women's (4)
  - Outdoor track and field (1): 2002
  - Basketball (3): 2017, 2022, 2024
- see also
  - SEC NCAA team championships
  - List of NCAA schools with the most NCAA Division I championships

=== Other national team championships ===
Below are the 4 national championships by varsity South Carolina teams not bestowed by the NCAA:

- Women's
  - Equestrian (4):
    - NCEA National Champions (4): 2005, 2007, 2015, 2026

== Rivalries ==
South Carolina's foremost rival is Clemson University. The two institutions are separated by just over 125 miles (201 km) and have been bitter rivals since Clemson's founding in 1889. A heated rivalry continues to this day for a variety of reasons, including the historic tensions regarding their respective charters along with the passions surrounding their athletic programs. The annual South Carolina-Clemson football game was previously the longest uninterrupted series in the South and the third longest uninterrupted series overall, first played in 1896 (four years after South Carolina's inaugural season), and was played every year from 1909 to 2019. However, the 2020 football game did not occur due to scheduling amidst the COVID-19 pandemic, although the rivalry was resumed in the 2021 football season and remains ongoing through the 2023 football season. Their baseball programs consistently qualify for the NCAA playoffs and frequently earn berths to the Men's College World Series in Omaha, Nebraska.

South Carolina continues to develop rivalries with other members of the SEC's East Division. South Carolina's main SEC rival has been the University of Georgia due to its proximity and the many years of competition before the Gamecocks joined the SEC. The "Halloween Game" against the University of Tennessee has the potential to be a big football game every year. Another notable rivalry within the East Division is the Gamecocks' men's soccer rivalry with the University of Kentucky. The only two SEC members that sponsor varsity men's soccer have played in the same conference since 2005, first in Conference USA and now in the Sun Belt Conference, with their games known as the SEC Derby.

When South Carolina was a member of the ACC (1953–1971), there was an intense rivalry with the University of North Carolina, particularly in basketball, since Frank McGuire had coached UNC but moved to Columbia to coach the Gamecocks. The rivalry was renewed in football during the 2007 season, with the Gamecocks defeating the Tar Heels 21–15.
