= Texas Relays =

Track and field competition in Austin, Texas

The Clyde Littlefield Texas Relays is an annual track and field competition held at Mike A. Myers Stadium in Austin, Texas. The University of Texas serves as host for the event, held on either the last weekend of March or first weekend of April.

Events are held in High School, College, University, and Invitational divisions.

== History ==
In response to cold-weather conditions at the Kansas Relays, the Texas Relays was started as a men's-only competition in 1925 by University of Texas coach Clyde Littlefield and athletic director Theo Bellmont. The Relays were held at Memorial Stadium until Mike A. Myers Stadium was opened in 1999. The meet was not held 1932–1934 as a result of the Great Depression. Women's events were added in 1963.

To encourage attendance in the early years of the event, various publicity stunts were staged. The most successful was a 1927 stunt in which three Tarahumaras were invited to the Relays. These men were famed as runners who never stopped running. A race was staged between the men from San Antonio to Memorial Stadium. After 14 hours and 53 minutes, the 89 mile race ended in a tie.

In 1977, electronic timing was introduced at the Relays, and Olympic gold medalist and Texas Longhorns football player John Wesley Jones recorded a time of 9.85 seconds in the 100 meter dash. This would have set a world record, but it was determined that the timer malfunctioned, and the time was unofficial.

The Texas Relays are currently the second largest track meet in the United States, behind only the Penn Relays. Today, approximately 50,000 spectators and 5,000 athletes attend the events.

== Local impact ==
According to the Austin Convention and Visitors Bureau in 2007, the Relays generate US$8 million for local business. Much of this traced to the fact that the event has become a social destination for young African Americans. A number of groups organize networking and development events for African Americans to take place in downtown Austin during the Relays.

Following alleged issues involving crime, some local businesses close for the Relays weekend. In 2009 Highland Mall closed several hours earlier than normal on account of the Texas Relays.

Some advocates of the Relays state that there is not a significant increase in crime during the Relays weekend. Some businesses have nonetheless chosen to not operate or to close early.

== Divisions ==
The University Division is open to schools in NCAA Division I. The College Division is open to schools in NCAA Division II, NCAA Division III, NAIA, or NJCAA schools. The University/College Division is open to schools that qualify for either division separately. The High School Division is separated into two levels, Division I and Division II. Division I is open to schools in the University Interscholastic League classes A, AA, or AAA (or their interstate equivalents). Division II is open to schools in UIL classes AAAA or AAAAA. Schools that normally compete in Division I may compete in Division II if they wish.

== Events held ==
Event	Invitational Men	Invitational Women	University Men	College Men	University / College Women	High School Boys	High School Girls
100 m	✓	✓	✓	✓	✓	✓	✓
1500 m			✓		✓		
1600 m						✓	✓
Mile	✓						
3200 m						✓	✓
5000 m			✓		✓		
10,000 m	✓	✓					
100 m hurdles		✓			✓		✓
110 m hurdles	✓		✓	✓		✓	
400 m hurdles	✓	✓	✓	✓	✓		
2000 m steeplechase						✓	✓
3000 m steeplechase			✓		✓		
High jump			✓		✓	✓	✓
Pole vault			✓		✓	✓	✓
Long jump			✓		✓	✓	✓
Triple jump			✓		✓	✓	✓
Shot put			✓		✓	✓	✓
Discus throw			✓		✓	✓	✓
Hammer throw			✓		✓		
Javelin throw			✓		✓		
Heptathlon					✓		
Decathlon			✓				
4 × 100 m relay	✓	✓	✓	✓	✓	✓	✓
4 × 200 m relay					✓	✓	✓
4 × 400 m relay	✓	✓	✓	✓	✓	✓	✓
4 × 800 m relay			✓	✓	✓	✓	✓
4 × 1500 m relay			✓				
1600m sprint medley			✓	✓		✓	✓
Distance medley					✓	✓	✓

Source. Note: Some men's events are combined for the university and College divisions.

== Meet records ==
=== Men ===
Men's meeting records of the Texas Relays
Event	Record	Athlete	Nationality	Date	Ref.
100 m	9.90 (+2.0 m/s)	Benjamin Azamati-Kwaku	Ghana	25 March 2022	
200 m	19.81 (+0.8 m/s)	Terrance Laird	United States	27 March 2021	
400 m	44.62	Bryce Deadmon	United States	27 March 2021	
800 m	1:45.31	Oussama El Bouchayby	Morocco	30 March 2023	
1500 m	3:41.15	Paul Larkins	Great Britain	1984	
Mile	3:56.98	Leonel Manzano	United States	2008	
5000 m	13:38.28	Ernest Cheruiyot	Kenya	28 March 2024	
10,000 m	28:05.36	Michael Musyoki	United States	1984	
110 m hurdles	13.13	Larry Wade	United States	2004	
400 m hurdles	48.44	Michael Stigler	United States	27 March 2015	
3000 m steeplechase	8:27.70	Henry Marsh	United States	1977	
High jump	2.33 m	Mark Boswell	Canada	2000	
High jump	2.33 m	JuVaughn Harrison	United States	1 April 2023	
Pole vault	5.92 m	Renaud Lavillenie	France	31 March 2018	
Pole vault	5.92 m	Shawnacy Barber	Canada	31 March 2018	
Pole vault	5.92 m	Armand Duplantis	Sweden	31 March 2018	
Long jump	8.23 m (+2.1 m/s)	Richard Duncan	Canada	3 April 1997	
Triple jump	17.09 m (+2.0 m/s)	O'Brien Wasome	Jamaica	30 March 2024	
Shot put	21.54 m	Adrian Piperi	United States	26 March 2022	
Discus throw	69.13 m	Ralford Mullings	Jamaica	29 March 2025	
Hammer throw	76.29 m	Denzel Comenentia	Netherlands	29 March 2018	
Javelin throw	89.10 m	Patrik Bodén	Sweden	24 March 1990	
Decathlon	8708 pts	Leo Neugebauer	Germany	27–28 March 2024	
Decathlon	100m (wind) / Long jump (wind) / Shot put / High jump / 400m / 110m H (wind) / Discus / Pole vault / Javelin / 1500m; 10.74 (+0.9 m/s) / 7.81 m (+0.5 m/s) / 17.26 m / 2.05 m / 47.99 / 14.51 (+1.0 m/s) / 51.50 m / 5.10 m / 58.99 m / 4:51.05				
4 × 100 m relay	37.88	HSI	United States	2001	
4 × 200 m relay	1:19.88	Austin All Stars	United States	1999	
4 × 400 m relay	2:59.73	Tiger Olympians: Quincy Downing; Michael Cherry; Vernon Norwood; Tyler Terry	United States	26 March 2022	
4 × 800 m relay	7:15.66	South Plains College: Aron Tanui; Trayquan Francis; Chevonne Hall; Kimar Farquharson	United States	1 April 2023	
4 × 1500 m relay	15:08.67	Arkansas	United States	1999	
Sprint medley relay (2-2-4-8)	3:12.13	Arkansas	United States	2000	
Distance medley relay	9:29.40	UTEP	United States	1979	

=== Women ===
Women's meeting records of the Texas Relays
Event	Record	Athlete	Nationality	Date	Ref.
100 m	10.93	Dawn Sowell	United States	1989	
200 m	22.08 (+1.2 m/s)	Gabrielle Thomas	United States	30 March 2024	
400 m	50.19	Shamier Little	United States	27 March 2021	
800 m	2:00.25	Shafiqua Maloney	Saint Vincent and the Grenadines	28 March 2024	
1500 m	4:13.53	Dana Mecke	United States	31 March 2018	
3000 m	9:13.90	Teena Colebrook	Great Britain	1991	
5000 m	15:25.27	Elizabeth Leachman	United States	28 March 2024	
10,000 m	31:28.92	Francie Larrieu-Smith	United States	1991	
100 m hurdles	12.36 (+2.0 m/s)	Masai Russell	United States	1 April 2023	
400 m hurdles	54.37	Britton Wilson	United States	25 March 2022	
3000 m steeplechase	10:10.93	Trina Cox	United States	2006	
High jump	1.95 m	Erin Aldrich	United States	2000	
High jump	1.95 m	Amy Acuff	United States	31 March 2012	
Pole vault	4.91 m	Jenn Suhr	United States	30 March 2019	
Long jump	7.14 m (+1.0 m/s)	Tara Davis	United States	26 March 2021	
Triple jump	14.48 m (+1.0 m/s)	Tori Franklin	United States	30 March 2018	
Shot put	18.58 m	Laura Gerraughty	United States	2006	
Discus throw	67.98 m	Valarie Allman	United States	29 March 2024	
Hammer throw	81.13 m AR	Camryn Rogers	Canada	2 April 2026	
Javelin throw	60.82 m	Kara Winger	United States	27 March 2015	
Heptathlon	6412 pts	Anna Hall	United States	23–24 March 2022	
Heptathlon	100m H (wind) / High jump / Shot put / 200m (wind) / Long jump (wind) / Javelin / 800m; 13.41 (+1.6 m/s) / 1.77 m / 13.45 m / 23.81 (−0.1 m/s) / 6.23 m (+0.9 m/s) / 40.98 m / 2:04.61				
4 × 100 m relay	41.74	Team USA Red: Tamari Davis; Gabrielle Thomas; Jenna Prandini; Anavia Battle	United States	29 March 2025	
4 × 200 m relay	1:27.05 WB	Team International: Dina Asher-Smith; Rhasidat Adeleke; Lanae-Tava Thomas; Julien Alfred	Great Britain; Ireland; Jamaica; Saint Lucia	30 March 2024	
4 × 400 m relay	3:22.94	University of Texas: Rhasidat Adeleke; Kennedy Simon; Stacey-Ann Williams; Davicia Patterson	Ireland; United States; United States; United States	25 March 2022	
4 × 800 m relay	8:20.69	Louisiana State University: Lorena Rangel Batres; Callie Hardy; Cindy Bourdier; Michaela Rose	United States	1 April 2023	
4 × 1500 m relay	18:11.51	Arkansas: Paige Johnston; Jillian Rosen; Miranda Walker; Kristen Gillespie	United States	8 April 2011	
Sprint medley relay (2-2-4-8)	3:36.10	University of Texas: Julien Alfred; Rhasidat Adeleke; Kennedy Simon; Valery Tobias	Saint Lucia; Ireland; United States; United States	31 March 2023	
Distance medley relay	10:59.86	Louisiana State University: Cindy Bourdier; Garriel White; Michaela Rose; Lorena Rangel Batres	United States	31 March 2023	

== Results by year ==
2020s	2010s	2000s	1990s	1980s	1970s	1960s	1950s	1940s	1930s	1920s
2029	2019	2009	1999	1989	1979	1969	1959	1949	1939	1929
2028	2018	2008	1998	1988	1978	1968	1958	1948	1938	1928
2027	2017	2007	1997	1987	1977	1967	1957	1947	1937	1927
2026	2016	2006	1996	1986	1976	1966	1956	1946	1936	1926
2025	2015	2005	1995	1985	1975	1965	1955	1945	1935	1925
2024	2014	2004	1994	1984	1974	1964	1954	1944	1934	
2023	2013	2003	1993	1983	1973	1963	1953	1943	1933	
2022	2012	2002	1992	1982	1972	1962	1952	1942	1932	
2021	2011	2001	1991	1981	1971	1961	1951	1941	1931	
2020	2010	2000	1990	1980	1970	1960	1950	1940	1930	
