= Sprint medley relay =

Track and field relay; legs of varying lengths

The sprint medley relay (SMR) is a track and field event in which teams of four athletes compete over sprinting distances as part of a relay race. Unlike most track relays, each member of the team runs a different distance. The sprint medley is rather uncommon, run most frequently at non-championship track meets which are focused on relays. Since these are not championship events, specific criteria for the event are not in common rulebooks. This leads to localized variations.

Sprint medley usually consists of two shorter sprints, followed by two single longer events. Usual conduct for safety is to run the shorter events first, in lanes to allow faster moving sprinters to exchange without interference. And faster moving athletes will have a more consistent tempo to prepare a handoff than with longer sprinters who are more prone to decelerate inconsistently as they finish their leg. By running two shorter sprints, mathematically the events can be conducted over an even number of laps.

The 2-2-4-8 sprint medley relay was held at the 1908 Summer Olympics, with a winning time of 3:29.4.

== Variations ==
Common lengths of the race could be 800 meters or 1600 meters. The 800 meters variation usually would be two 100 meters legs, a 200 meters leg and a 400 meters leg. The 800 meter version is sometimes referred to as the Super Sprint Medley Relay to distinguish it from the longer version. More commonly, the 800 meters version is distinguished by abbreviated leg numbers (1-1-2-4). The events are usually not referred to by their cumulative distance as that would tend to indicate 4 legs of the same distance. The 1600 meters variation usually would be two 200 meters legs, a 400 meters leg and an 800 meters leg. It would be named numerically (2-2-4-8). Some have done a 1000 meters variation, which does not fit into an even number of laps, running a 100 meters leg, a 200 meters leg, a 300 meters leg and a 400 meters leg. The (1-2-3-4) format is referred to as the Swedish relay. At some youth level meets, where the handoff is not as refined, the 400 meters leg has been conducted first. This is consistent with a related event, the Distance medley relay which starts with a longer race. At a higher level of athlete, this would put handoffs for short sprinting legs into theoretical common passing zones unless the track is specifically marked with the 4 turn stagger required to run a 4 × 200 meters relay entirely in lanes. Short sprinters moving around in a common passing zone at the last moment is a potentially chaotic situation.

== Conduct ==
The descriptions below describe how to conduct the variations of the event using commonly available markings. It is assumed 4 turn staggers are not common, and even if they are marked, appropriate passing zones are not marked for the (1-1-2-4) version using either a 4 turn or 3 turn stagger. So these descriptions use a standard 2 turn stagger, causing the athletes to break to the inside following the exchange at the end of the first lap. Colors mentioned are specific only if the track is marked following rulebook recommendations. Since they are only recommendations in the rulebook, some tracks choose to paint their lines using localized color schemes.

=== 1-1-2-4 ===
The start and first two legs are conducted identical to a 4 × 100 meters relay, using the same passing zones, these would be colored yellow. The third leg of 200 meters would skip the third 4 × 100 zone and handoff at the blue 4 × 400 meters relay passing zone. Because the incoming leg is running 200 meters, the outgoing 400 meters leg is allowed to use the acceleration zone before the pass. After receiving the baton, the final leg would break to the inside as in a 4 × 400 race on a 2 turn stagger.

==== 2-1-1-4 ====
Some might choose to run the 200 meter leg first, inverting the skipped zone on the first lap from the third zone to the first zone.

=== 2-2-4-8 ===
The race would start the same as a 4 × 400 on the white/blue/white lines, but since the first two athletes are doing 200 meters, would skip the first and third exchange zones used in the 4 × 100, only using the yellow second zone halfway around the track. On an indoor 200 meter track, this would be conducted in exactly the same fashion as an outdoor 4 × 400, with the runners breaking to the inside following the first lap, except the athletes would be allowed to use the acceleration zone. On an outdoor track, the third runner would exchange in the standard blue 4 × 400 zone and would then break to run in lane one at the green break line at the beginning of the back straight (500 m into the race). The final exchange would also be like a 4 × 400 exchange, but the final runner would do an 800 meters (This race is sometimes run in reverse order, beginning with the 800 meter leg, followed by the 400 leg, and then finishing with the two 200 meter legs).

An 8-2-2-4 sprint medley relay was held as an exhibition event at the 1993 IAAF World Indoor Championships.

== All-time top 25 ==
=== Men (1-1-2-4) ===
Rank	Time	Team	Nation	Date	Place	Ref.
1	1:26.89		United States	2022		

=== Women (1-1-2-4) ===
Rank	Time	Team	Nation	Date	Place	Ref.
1	1:35.20	Destinee Brown; Aaliyah Brown; Kimberlyn Duncan; Raevyn Rogers	United States	28 April 2018	Philadelphia	
2	1:35.59	Morolake Akinosun; English Gardner; Dezerea Bryant; Miki Barber	United States	29 April 2017	Philadelphia	
3	1:36.05	University of Nebraska; Rhonda Blanford; Angie Thacker; Janet Burke; Merlene Ottey	United States; United States; Jamaica; Jamaica	9 April 1983	Austin	
4	1:36.64	Atoms TC; Jennifer Inniss; Helena Nelson; Grace Jackson; Diane Dixon	Guyana; United States; Jamaica; United States	5 April 1986	Tempe	
5	1:36.67	Audra Segree; Natasha Morrison; Anastasia Le-Roy; Verone Chambers	Jamaica	29 April 2017	Philadelphia	
6	1:36.70	University of Tennessee; Sharrieffa Barksdale; Cathy Rattray; Benita Fitzgerald; Delisa Walton	United States; Jamaica; United States; United States	29 May 1981	Austin	
7	1:36.79	Wilt's AC; Brenda Morehead; Jeanette Bolden; Alice Brown; Arlise Emerson	United States	20 June 1982	Knoxville	
8	1:36.80	Los Angeles TC; Pam Page; Rhonda Blanford; Merlene Ottey; Latanya Sheffield	United States; United States; Jamaica; United States	16 June 1985	Indianapolis	
9	1:36.81	Louisiana State University; Tananjalyn Stanley; Cinnamon Sheffield; Esther Jones; Dawn Sowell	United States	8 April 1989	Austin	
10	1:37.06	University of Texas; Carlette Guidry; Tamela Saldana; Leslie Hardison; Barbara Flowers	United States	8 April 1989	Austin	
11	1:37.11	University of Texas; Charletta Gaines; Carlette Guidry; Mary Bolden; Barbara Flowers	United States	8 April 1988	Austin	
12	1:37.22	Lekeisha Lawson; Tawanna Meadows; Kim Duncan; Autumne Franklin	United States	29 April 2017	Philadelphia	
13	1:37.29	California State-Los Angeles; Valerie Milan; Yolanda Rich; Cynthia Mills; Rosalyn Bryant	United States	26 May 1978	Knoxville	
14	1:37.32	Arizona State University; Tesra Bester; LaShawn Simmons; Shanequa Campbell; Maicel Malone	United States	6 April 1991	Tempe	
15	1:37.40	Ali TC; Adrienne Lair; Rosalyn Bryant; Jackie Pusey; Denean Howard	United States; United States; Jamaica; United States	15 June 1980	Walnut	
16	1:37.41	UCLA; Missy Jerald; Jeanette Bolden; Florence Griffith; Sherri Howard	United States	29 May 1981	Austin	
17	1:37.42	Khalifa St. Fort; Reyare Thomas; Kai Selvon; Sparkle McKnight	Trinidad and Tobago	28 April 2018	Philadelphia	
18	1:37.46	Puma Energizer; Pam Page; Sandra Howard; Lisa Hopkins; Rosalyn Bryant	United States	19 June 1983	Indianapolis	
19	1:37.57	LA Naturite; T Howard; Denean Howard; Ada Hay; Dunlap	United States	20 June 1982	Knoxville	
20	1:37.64	Puma TC; Janet Burke; Wendy Vereen; Randy Givens; Juliet Cuthbert	Jamaica; United States; United States; Jamaica	16 June 1985	Indianapolis	
21	1:37.86	LA Naturite; Ada Hay; Jennifer Inniss; Yolanda Rich; Jackie Pusey	United States; Guyana; United States; Jamaica	21 June 1981	Sacramento	
22	1:37.87	Dezerea Bryant; Aaliyah Brown; Destiny Carter; Raevyn Rogers	United States	27 April 2019	Philadelphia	
23	1:37.88	Atoms TC; Serina Henry; Helena Nelson; Grace Jackson; Diane Dixon	United States; United States; Jamaica; United States	7 April 1984	Tempe	
24	1:37.95	Louisiana State University; Kim Carson; Cheryl Taplin; Heather Van Norman; Youlanda Warren	United States	3 April 1993	Austin	
25	1:37.96	Ms International Alice Jackson		19 June 1983	Indianapolis	

=== Men (2-2-4-8) ===
Rank	Time	Team	Nation	Date	Place	Ref.
1	3:10.76	Santa Monica Track Club; Carl Lewis; Ferran Tyler; Benny Hollis; Johnny Gray	United States	6 April 1985	Tempe	
2	3:11.08	Athletic Attic; Mel Lattany; Larry Myricks; Walter McCoy; James Mays	United States	2 April 1983	Tempe	
3	3:11.45	Beejay Lee; Wallace Spearmon; Bryshon Nellum; Donavan Brazier	United States	29 April 2017	Philadelphia	
4	3:11.72	Santa Monica Track Club; Mark McNeil; Carl Lewis; Anthony Ketchum; Johnny Gray	United States	7 April 1984	Tempe	
5	3:11.88	Bud Light; Mel Lattany; Larry Myricks; Walter McCoy; James Mays	United States	7 April 1984	Tempe	
6	3:11.94	Texas A&M; Fred Kerley; Elijah Morrow; Mylik Kerley; Devin Dixon	United States	28 April 2017	Baton Rouge	
7	3:12.00	Nike Atlantic Coast; Tod Long; Neil DeSilva; Calvin Davis; Sean Maye	United States; Trinidad; United States; United States	5 April 1996	Austin	
8	3:12.02	Tiger International; Bill Collins; Fred Taylor; Mark Rowe; Mike Solomon	United States; United States; United States; Trinidad	2 April 1983	Tempe	
9	3:12.10	USA Red; Leo Bookman; Karron Conwright; Mitch Potter; Khadevis Robinson	United States	30 April 2005	Philadelphia	
10	3:12.13	Arkansas; Chandun O'Neal; Melvin Lister; Sam Glover; James Karanu	United States; United States; United States; Kenya	7 April 2000	Austin	
11	3:12.17	Auburn University; Sanjay Ayre; Coby Miller; Avard Moncur; Aaron Richberg	Jamaica; United States; Bahamas; United States	7 April 2000	Austin	
12	3:12.19	University of Alabama; LeMar Smith; Calvin Smith; Terry Menefee; William Wuyke	United States; United States; United States; Venezuela	30 April 1983	Des Moines	
13	3:12.25	Louisiana State University; Nethaneel Mitchell-Blake; Jaron Flournoy; Michael Cherry; Blair Henderson	Great Britain; United States; United States; United States	28 April 2017	Baton Rouge	
14	3:12.30	Abilene Christian University; Joseph Styles; Kevin Dilworth; Robert Guy; Savieri Ngidhi	Bahamas; United States; Trinidad; Zimbabwe	7 April 1995	Austin	
15	3:12.75	Santa Monica Track Club; Floyd Heard; Carl Lewis; LaMont Smith; Johnny Gray	United States	20 April 1997	Walnut	
16	3:12.77	Rice University; Terry Jones; Vince Courville; John Bell; Gawain Guy	United States; United States; United States; Jamaica	30 April 1983	Des Moines	
17	3:12.88	Abilene Christian University; Joe Styles; Kevin Dilworth; Robert Guy; Savieri Ngidhi	United States; United States; Trinidad; Zimbabwe	28 April 1995	Philadelphia	
18	3:13.00	Baylor University; Kermit Ward; Michael Johnson; Raymond Pierre; Terril Davis	United States	8 April 1989	Austin	
19	3:13.06	Texas Tech; Michael Mathieu; Tyree Gailes; Andrae Williams; Jonathan Johnson	Bahamas; United States; Bahamas; United States	8 April 2005	Austin	
20	3:13.12	Remontay McLain; Markesh Woodson; Reggie Wyatt; Casimir Loxsom	United States	29 April 2017	Philadelphia	
20	3:13.12	Mississippi State; Rodrigo Rocha; Philip Smith; Alfred Larry; Brandon McBride	Brazil; Jamaica; United States; Canada	2 April 2016	Gainesville	
22	3:13.21	University of Florida; Rickey Harris; Aaron Armstrong; Geno White; Moise Joseph	United States; Trinidad; United States; Haiti	27 April 2001	Philadelphia	
23	3:13.22	Auburn University; Sanjay Ayre; Coby Miller; Avard Moncur; Aaron Richberg	Jamaica; United States; Bahamas; United States	28 April 2000	Philadelphia	
24	3:13.28	University of Tennessee; Donelle Dunning; Shane Lacy; Marwin Kline; Jose Parrilla	United States	April 1994	Philadelphia	
25	3:13.31	University of Texas; Jason Leach; Earle Laing; John Patterson; Pablo Squella	United States; Jamaica; United States; Chile	4 April 1986	Austin	

=== Women (2-2-4-8) ===
- Updated April 2023.

Rank	Time	Team	Nation	Date	Place	Ref.
1	3:34.56	Sherri-Ann Brooks; Rosemarie Whyte; Moya Thompson; Kenia Sinclair	Jamaica	25 April 2009	Philadelphia	
2	3:34.64	Simone Facey; Kerron Stewart; Melaine Walker; Kenia Sinclair	Jamaica	30 April 2011	Philadelphia	
3	3:35.37	Schillonie Calvert; Kerron Stewart; Melaine Walker; Kenia Sinclair	Jamaica	24 April 2010	Philadelphia	
4	3:36.10	University of Texas; Julien Alfred; Rhasidat Adeleke; Kennedy Simon; Valery Tobias	Saint Lucia; Ireland; United States; United States	31 March 2023	Austin	
5	3:37.16	Rachelle Smith; Lauryn Williams; Monica Hargrove; Hazel Clark	United States	29 April 2006	Philadelphia	
6	3:37.37	Anna Geflikh; Daria Safonova; Antonia Krivoshapha; Maria Savinova	Russia	25 April 2009	Philadelphia	
7	3:37.42	Allyson Felix; Kia Davis; Debbie Dunn; Hazel Clark	United States	30 April 2005	Philadelphia	
8	3:37.61	Nadine Palmer; Aleen Bailey; Sonita Sutherland; Kenia Sinclair	Jamaica	26 April 2008	Philadelphia	
9	3:37.62	Tom Jones All-Stars; Tiffany Ross		4 April 2009	Gainesville	
10	3:37.81	Porscha Lucas; Lashaunte’a Moore; Sheena Tosta; Phoebe Wright	United States	30 April 2011	Philadelphia	
11	3:37.87	Juliet Campbell; Novlene Williams; Ronetta Smith; Kenia Sinclair	Jamaica	30 April 2005	Philadelphia	
12	3:37.94	Alexandria Anderson; Charonda Williams; Moushaumi Robinson; Ajeé Wilson	United States	26 April 2014	Philadelphia	
13	3:38.36	Rachelle Smith; Ebonie Floyd; Debbie Dunn; Hazel Clark	United States	25 April 2009	Philadelphia	
14	3:38.41	Natasha Morrison; Anastasia Le-Roy; Patricia Hall; Natoya Goule	Jamaica	26 April 2014	Philadelphia	
15	3:38.53	Natasha Hastings; Dee Dee Trotter; Sheena Tosta; Alysia Johnson	United States	24 April 2010	Philadelphia	
16	3:38.89	Rachelle Smith; Miki Barber; Monica Hargrove; Hazel Clark	United States	28 April 2007	Philadelphia	
17	3:38.93	Texas A&M University; Laila Owens; Charokee Young; Jaevin Reed; Bailey Goggans	United States	25 March 2022	Austin	
18	3:38.95	University of Texas; Julien Alfred; Rhasidat Adeleke; Kennedy Simon; Brooke Jaworski	Saint Lucia; Ireland; United States; United States	25 March 2022	Austin	
19	3:39.04	Texas A&M; Diamond Spaulding; Brenessa Thompson; Jaevin Reed; Jazmine Fray	United States; Guyana; United States; Jamaica	27 April 2017	Baton Rouge	
20	3:39.05	Oregon; Makenzie Dunmore; Deajah Stevens; Hannah Waller; Raevyn Rogers	United States	27 April 2017	Philadelphia	
21	3:39.07	Juanita Broaddus; Natalie Knight; Miriam Barnes; Alysia Johnson	United States	25 April 2009	Philadelphia	
22	3:39.16	World All-Stars; Lavern Jones; Sherry Fletcher; Cydonie Mothercill; Mirian Barnett	US Virgin Islands; Grenada; Cayman Islands; Guyana	26 April 2008	Philadelphia	
23	3:39.55	Rachelle Boone-Smith; Ebony Collins; Nicole Leach; Anna Willard	United States	24 April 2010	Philadelphia	
24	3:39.82	Vicky Barr; Nicola Sanders; Chistine Ohuruogu; Jemma Simpson	Great Britain	24 April 2010	Philadelphia	
25	3:40.34	Kia Davis; Amandi Rhett; Debbie Dunn; Treniere Clement	United States	29 April 2006	Philadelphia	

== See also ==
- Distance medley relay
- Swedish relay
