= South Carolina Gamecocks men's track and field =

South Carolina Gamecocks
- University: University of South Carolina
- Head coach: Tim Hall (2nd season)
- Conference: SEC
- Location: Columbia, South Carolina, US
- Indoor track: USC Indoor Facility
- Outdoor track: Weems Baskin Track Facility
- Nickname: Gamecocks
- Colors: Garnet and black

NCAA Indoor Tournament Appearances
- 1974, 1981, 1990, 1993, 1994, 1996, 1997, 1998, 1999, 2000, 2001, 2002, 2003, 2004, 2005, 2006, 2007, 2008, 2009, 2010, 2011, 2012, 2016, 2017, 2018, 2019, 2021, 2022, 2023, 2024, 2025, 2026

NCAA Outdoor Tournament Appearances
- 1948, 1965, 1966, 1967, 1970, 1971, 1972, 1973, 1976, 1980, 1990, 1996, 1997, 1998, 1999, 2000, 2001, 2002, 2003, 2004, 2005, 2006, 2007, 2008, 2009, 2010, 2015, 2016, 2017, 2018, 2019, 2021, 2023, 2024, 2025, 2026

The South Carolina Gamecocks men's track and field team represents the University of South Carolina and competes in the Southeastern Conference. The team has been coached by Tim Hall since 2023. The facilities continue to be improved, including the recent addition of 1,450 seats at the outdoor track and field facility.

== Gamecocks in the Olympics ==
- Leroy Dixon (2008, United States, 4 × 100 meters relay)
- Adrian Durant (2004; Virgin Islands; 100 meters, 200 meters, & 4 × 100 meters relay)
- Otis Harris (2004, United States; 400 meters, silver medal; 4 × 400 meters relay, gold medal)
- Rodney Martin (2008, United States, 4 × 100 meters relay)
- Jason Richardson (2012, United States, 110 meters hurdles, silver medal)
- Brad Snyder (1996, 2000, & 2004; Canada; shot put)
- Terrence Trammell (2000, 2004, & 2008; United States; 110 meters hurdles; 2000 & 2004 silver medals)
- Marvin Watts (2000, Jamaica, 800 meters)
- Quincy Hall (2024, United States, 400 meters, gold medal)
- Anass Essayi (2024, Morocco, 1500 meters)
- Eric Favors (2024, Ireland, shot put)

== Year-by-year results ==
Season	Coach	Indoor finish		Outdoor finish	
Season	Coach	Conference	National	Conference	National
Southern Conference (1929-1953)
1929	—	—	—	15th (3.5)	—
1930 No Records
1931	—	14th (1)	—	16th (3.5)	—
1932	—	13th (1)	—	—	—
1933	—	9th (1)	—	6th (11)	—
1934	—	7th (7)	—	—	—
1935	—	—	—	10th (.5)	—
1936	—	8th (2)	—	—	—
1937	—	8th (3)	—	7th (6)	—
1938	—	—	—	8th (8)	—
1939	—	5th (7)	—	T-4th (22)	—
1940	—	6th	—	7th (8)	—
1941	—	—	—	13th (2)	—
1942	—	9th (2)	—	4th (19)	—
1943	—	—	—	4th (15.5)	—
1944-1945 No Team
1946	—	—	—	5th (19.5)	—
1947 No Records
1948	Sterling DuPre	—	—	5	16
1949	Weems Baskin	5th (4)	—	T-10	—
1950	Weems Baskin	—	—	6	—
1951	Weems Baskin	—	—	6	—
1952	Weems Baskin	—	—	8	—
1953	Weems Baskin	10 (1.5)	—	6	—
Atlantic Coast Conference (1954-1971)
1954	Weems Baskin	5	—	4	—
1955	Weems Baskin	4	—	4	—
1956	Weems Baskin	7	—	5	—
1957	Weems Baskin	7	—	4	—
1958	Weems Baskin	T-4	—	4	—
1959	Weems Baskin	4	—	4	—
1960	Weems Baskin	4	—	4	—
1961	Weems Baskin	6	—	T-4	—
1962	Weems Baskin	5	—	4	—
1963	Weems Baskin	T-5	—	5	—
1964	Weems Baskin	3	—	4	—
1965	Weems Baskin	4	—	4	T-55
1966	Weems Baskin	5	—	2	T-49
1967	Weems Baskin	5	—	4	T-43
1968	Weems Baskin	4	—	T-2	—
1969	Weems Baskin	4	—	2	—
1970	John West	3	—	2	—
1971	John West	4	—	2	—
Independent (1972-1983)
1972	John West	—	—	—	—
1973	Bill McClure	—	—	—	—
1974	Bill McClure	—	3	—	—
1975	Bill McClure	—	—	—	—
1976	Bill McClure	—	—	—	T-47
1977	Charlie Strong	—	—	—	—
1978	Charlie Strong	—	—	—	—
1979	Charlie Strong	—	—	—	—
1980	Charlie Strong	—	—	—	T-50
1981	Charlie Strong	—	T-60	—	—
1982	Charlie Strong	—	—	—	—
1983	Charlie Strong	—	—	—	—
Metro Conference (1984-1991)
1984	Charlie Strong	—	—	3	—
1985	Charlie Strong	—	—	4	—
1986	Charlie Strong	—	—	3	—
1987	Charlie Strong	—	—	2	—
1988	Charlie Strong	—	—	2	—
1989	Charlie Strong	—	—	2	—
1990	Greg Kraft	—	T-34	2	T-68
1991	Greg Kraft	—	—	2	—
Southeastern Conference (1992-present)
1992	Greg Kraft	8	—	10	—
1993	Greg Kraft	9	T-24	8	—
1994	Greg Kraft	7	T-19	4	—
1995	Greg Kraft	5	—	8	—
1996	Greg Kraft	5	T-38	5	T-50
1997	Curtis Frye	4	7	5	T-40
1998	Curtis Frye	4	T-7	5	T-11
1999	Curtis Frye	2	4	6	T-6
2000	Curtis Frye	8	T-8	8	T-11
2001	Curtis Frye	T-7	T-16	8	T-19
2002	Curtis Frye	9	6	7	6
2003	Curtis Frye	3	4	T-6	10
2004	Curtis Frye	7	14	10	T-31
2005	Curtis Frye	7	9	9	T-26
2006	Curtis Frye	5	T-33	5	T-30
2007	Curtis Frye	10	T-25	8	34
2008	Curtis Frye	7	T-30	7	18th
2009	Curtis Frye	T-4	T-20	4	6th
2010	Curtis Frye	4	T-8	3	11th
2011	Curtis Frye	8	57th	11	—
2012	Curtis Frye	9	26th	9	—
2013	Curtis Frye	12	—	13	—
2014	Curtis Frye	12	—	12	—
2015	Curtis Frye	10	—	11	T-60th
2016	Curtis Frye	9th	T-51st	11th	T-47th
2017	Curtis Frye	11th	T-36th	8th	T-49th
2018	Curtis Frye	T-9th	T-21st	12th	T-35th
2019	Curtis Frye	10th	20th	10th	12th
2020	Curtis Frye	11th			
2021	Curtis Frye	11th	T-46th	12th	42nd
2022	Curtis Frye	12th	T-47th	12th	
2023	Curtis Frye	11th	T-36th	12th	T-44th
2024	Tim Hall	4th	24th	10th	40th
2025	Tim Hall	8th	T-18	11th	T-23
2026	Tim Hall	11	T-7	15	

Notes: The 2020 season was canceled after the SEC Championships due to the Coronavirus Pandemic; the NCAA Championships were not held.

The Metro Conference did not sponsor an indoor track and field championship.
