= Tyson Invitational =

American sporting competition

- Date: Second weekend in February
- Location: Fayetteville, Arkansas, United States
- Event type: Track and field
- Website: Tyson Invitational

The Tyson Invitational, is an annual indoor track and field meet which is held in early February at the Randal Tyson Track Center. It was first held in Track Capital of the South, in Fayetteville, Arkansas.

The competition is part of National Collegiate Athletic Association's Indoor and attracts high caliber athletes, including Olympic and World medalists.

== World records ==
Over the course of its history, two world records has been set at the Tyson Invitational.

Year	Event	Record	Athlete	Nationality	Ref.
2006	4 × 400 m relay	3:01.96	Kerron Clement; Wallace Spearmon; Darold Williamson; Jeremy Wariner	United States	
2026	400 m	44.52	Khaleb McRae	United States	

== Meeting records ==
=== Men ===
Men's meeting records of the Tyson Invitational
Event	Record	Athlete	Nationality	Date	Ref.
60 m	6.43	Jordan Anthony	United States	13 February 2026	
200 m	20.19	Wallace Spearmon	United States	16 February 2008	
400 m	44.52	Khaleb McRae	United States	13 February 2026	
800 m	1:45.59	Charlie Hunter	Australia	13 February 2021	
Long jump	8.29 m	Cordell Tinch	United States	13 February 2026	
Weight throw	24.58 m	Ryan Johnson	United States	13 February 2026	

=== Women ===
Women's meeting records of the Tyson Invitational
Event	Record	Athlete	Nationality	Date	Ref.
60 m	6.99	Julien Alfred	Saint Lucia	13 February 2026	
200 m	22.36	Favour Ofili	Nigeria	11 February 2023	
400 m	50.66	Britton Wilson	United States	13 February 2026	
800 m	1:58.69	Shafiqua Maloney	Saint Vincent and the Grenadines	10 February 2024	
Weight throw	25.47 m	Jalani Davis	United States	13 February 2026	
4 × 400 m relay	3:26.27	Texas A&M University: Jania Martin (53.04); Charokee Young (51.86); Syaira Richardson (51.12); Athing Mu (50.27)	United States; Jamaica; United States; United States	13 February 2021	
Distance medley relay	10:53.77	Arkansas University		12 February 2021	
