= South Carolina Gamecocks men's swimming and diving =

South Carolina Gamecocks
- Founded: 1964
- Athletic director: Jeremiah Donati
- Head coach: Jeff Poppell (2nd season)
- Conference: Southeastern Conference
- Location: Columbia, South Carolina, US
- Home pool: Carolina Natatorium
- Nickname: Gamecocks
- Colors: Garnet and black

NCAA Championship appearances
- 1974, 1981, 1984, 1985, 1986, 1987, 1988, 1989, 1990, 1991, 1992, 1993, 1994, 1995, 1998, 1999, 2000, 2001, 2002, 2003, 2004, 2005, 2006, 2007, 2009, 2011, 2013, 2014, 2015, 2016, 2017, 2018, 2019

Conference Champions
- Metro Conference; 1984, 1985, 1986, 1987, 1988, 1989, 1990, 1991

The South Carolina Gamecocks men's swimming and diving team represents the University of South Carolina and competes in the Southeastern Conference. The team has been coached by former Florida Gators women's team coach Jeff Poppell since 2021.
