= Natalie Knight =

American sprinter (born 1986)

Personal information
- Nationality: American
- Born: October 24, 1986
- Home town: Snellville, Georgia

Sport
- Sport: Athletics
- Events: 200 metres, 100 metres
- College team: Florida Gators
- Club: Unattached

Achievements and titles
- National finals: 2005 NCAA; 200 m, 6th; 2005 USA U20s; • 200m, 5th; 4 × 100 m, 6th; 2007 NCAA; 4 × 100 m, 7th; 2008 NCAA; 200 m, 6th; 2008 USA Champs; • 200m, 5th
- Personal bests: 100m: 11.42 (+1.6) (2008); 200m: 22.84 (+0.7) (2008)

Natalie Knight (born 24 October 1986) is an American former sprinter who competed primarily in the 200 metres. She was a four-time NCAA Division I Women's Outdoor Track and Field Championships finalist, and during her brief professional career, she competed internationally in the 2010 Diamond League.

== Biography ==
Knight competed at Shiloh High School, where she set several school records and set the AAU Junior Olympic Games record in the 4 × 100 metres relay with a time of 44.79.

She competed collegiately for the Florida Gators track and field team, where she placed 6th in the 2005 NCAA Division I Outdoor Track and Field Championships in the 200 m as a freshman and then placed 6th again as a senior.

In 2008, she competed at the U.S. Olympic Trials, where she qualified for the quarter-finals but did not reach the semifinals.

In 2009, Knight represented the United States in a sprint medley relay at the Penn Relays, running a time of 3:39.07, at the time the 10th-fastest mark of all time in a race won by Jamaica which set the still-standing world record of 3:34.56.

In 2010, Knight competed at the inaugural Diamond League meeting in Doha, Qatar, finishing 6th in the 200 m with a time of 23.22.

== Statistics ==
=== Personal bests ===
Event	Mark	Competition	Venue	Date
100 metres	11.42 (+1.6 m/s)	SEC Track and Field Championships	Auburn, Alabama	18 May 2008
200 metres	22.84 (+0.7 m/s)	SEC Track and Field Championships	Auburn, Alabama	18 May 2008
4 × 100 metres relay	42.85	Mt. SAC Relays	Walnut, California	20 April 2008
Sprint medley relay	3:39.07	Penn Relays	Philadelphia, Pennsylvania	25 April 2009
