= Jeremiah Donati =

American college sports administrator

Current position
- Title: Athletic director
- Team: South Carolina
- Conference: SEC

Biographical details
- Born: Massachusetts, U.S.
- Education: University of Puget Sound (BS); Whittier Law School (JD)

Administrative career (AD unless noted)
- 2013–2016: TCU (associate athletics director)
- 2016–2017: TCU (deputy athletics director)
- 2017–2024: TCU
- 2024–present: South Carolina

Jeremiah B. Donati is an American university sports administrator who is currently the athletic director at the University of South Carolina. Donati was previously the athletic director at Texas Christian University.

== Early life ==
Donati was born in Massachusetts and raised in Pullman, Washington while his father was the team doctor for Washington State University. From fifth to seventh grade, Donati served as a ball boy for the Washington State men's basketball team led by Kelvin Sampson. Donati grew up with his friend and mentor, future University of Texas at Austin athletic director, Chris Del Conte. He first attended the University of Puget Sound, where he played college basketball, and later received his JD from Whittier Law School. In the summers between school years, Donati interned under Del Conte.

== Career ==
Following college, Donati first became a sports agent working for Leigh Steinberg.

In 2011, Donati accepted an offer from then-Texas Christian University (TCU) athletic director Del Conte as the leader of TCU's booster organization, seeking a change of pace from dealing with both the ongoing NFL lockout and the mundane requirements of his job. Donati was promoted to associate athletics director in 2013 and then to deputy athletics director in 2016. While in those positions, he was a lead fundraiser for the renovations of Amon G. Carter Stadium, as well as being the primary coordinator for the renovation of other TCU sports facilities, including Schollmaier Arena and Lupton Stadium. In December 2017, Donati was appointed as the athletic director for TCU, replacing Del Conte upon the latter taking the athletic director position at Texas. While athletic director at TCU, Donati oversaw the construction of a new $40 million performance center for TCU athletics. Donati also oversaw the departure from longtime TCU football head coach, Gary Patterson, and the football program's appearance in the 2023 College Football Playoff National Championship under new head coach, Sonny Dykes.

In December 2024, Donati left TCU to accept the position of athletic director for the University of South Carolina. In 2026, Donati began leading a search for a new head coach for South Carolina baseball after he parted ways with former manager Paul Mainieri earlier in the year.

== Personal life ==
While Donati was an agent in Newport Beach, California, he met his future wife, Nicole. Together, they have two daughters: Colette and Naomi.
