= Otis Harris =

American sprinter

Personal information
- Born: June 30, 1982 (age 44) Edwards, Mississippi, U.S.

Sport
- Sport: Running
- Event: 400 meters

Achievements and titles
- Personal best: 400 m: 44.16
Medal record
Men's athletics
Representing the United States
Olympic Games
Gold medal – first place	2004 Athens	4 × 400 metres relay
Silver medal – second place	2004 Athens	400 metres

Otis Harris Jr. (born June 30, 1982, in Edwards, Mississippi) is an American track and field athlete. He won the silver medal in the 400 meters at the 2004 Summer Olympics.

Harris attended Hinds Agricultural High School in Utica, Mississippi, and collected several honors during his high school career, being named first team All-American just being one of them. He twice won the 400 meters in the junior Olympics and led his team to three state championships. In 2000 he enrolled at the University of South Carolina. As a Gamecock, he was a member of their 2002 NCAA championship 4 × 400 m relay team and finished as the runner-up in the 400 m in 2003.

At the 2004 Summer Olympics Harris won the silver medal in the 400 meters. He came in second in both of his qualifying runs before placing second to fellow US team member Jeremy Wariner in the final. Derrick Brew came in third and all three athletes together with Darold Williamson won a gold medal in the 4 × 400 m relay for the United States. One month later Harris finished third at the World Athletics Final.

Harris trains with his college coach Curtis Frye in Columbia, South Carolina. He has not run under 45 seconds since 2004, nor has he competed in a major international championship.
