= Makenzie Dunmore =

American sprinter (born 1997)

Personal information
- Nationality: United States
- Born: October 7, 1997 (age 28)
- Home town: Powder Springs, Georgia, U.S.
- Education: McEachern High School; University of Oregon; University of South Carolina
- Height: 171 cm (5 ft 7 in)
- Weight: 62 kg (137 lb)

Sport
- Sport: Sport of athletics
- Events: 400 metres 200 metres
- College team: Oregon Ducks; South Carolina Gamecocks
- Club: Empire Athletics

Achievements and titles
- National finals: 2017 NCAA Indoors; • 4 × 400 m, 2nd (silver); 2017 NCAAs; • 4 × 400 m, 1st (gold); 2018 NCAA Indoors; • 4 × 400 m, 4th; 2019 NCAA Indoors; • Distance medley, 1st (gold); 2022 NCAAs; • 400 m, 9th; • 4 × 100 m, DQ; • 4 × 400 m, 5th; 2023 USA Champs; • 400 m, 6th
- Personal bests: 400 m: 50.35 (2023) 200 m: 22.53 (+1.4) (2018)
- Updated on April 4, 2024

Makenzie Dunmore (born October 7, 1997) is an American sprinter. Running for the Oregon Ducks and South Carolina Gamecocks, she won two NCAA Division I championship titles in relays and finished 6th individually at the 2023 USA Outdoor Track and Field Championships over 400 metres.

== Career ==
Dunmore began competing at the AAU Junior Olympics as early as 2010, winning a U19 title over 400 m in 2015. At McEachern High School, she was the 2014 Georgia High School Association 400 m state champion.

As a member of the Oregon Ducks track and field team, Dunmore won NCAA relay titles at the 2017 outdoor 4 × 400 m and the 2019 indoor distance medley.

After a two-year hiatus, Dunmore transferred to the South Carolina Gamecocks track and field as a graduate student. She then achieved her best individual 400 m showing of 9th at the 2022 NCAA Division I Outdoor Track and Field Championships.

At the 2023 USA Outdoor Track and Field Championships, Dunmore finished 6th in the 400 m, qualifying her for the relay pool to represent the U.S. at the 2023 World Athletics Championships. However, she ultimately was not selected to run the heats or finals of the 4 × 400 m.

== Personal life ==
Dunmore is from Powder Springs, Georgia where she attended McEachern High School.

Dunmore was a member of the Oregon Ducks track and field team from 2017 to 2018, but she left Oregon after finishing her undergraduate degree and giving birth to her son.

After college, Dunmore joined the Empire Athletics club to train as a professional.

== Statistics ==
=== Personal best progression ===
400 m progression
#	Mark	Pl.	Competition	Venue	Date	Ref.
1	55.44	3rd place, bronze medalist(s)	JunOly	Sacramento, CA	July 31, 2010	
2	54.72	(gold) (Heat 12)	AAU Junior Olympics, Turner Stadium Humble High School	Humble, TX	August 2, 2012	
3	53.77	2nd place, silver medalist(s)	AAU Junior Olympics, Turner Stadium Humble High School	Humble, TX	August 3, 2012	
4	53.32	2nd place, silver medalist(s)	GHSA Girls State Meet – All Classes	Albany, GA	May 8, 2015	
5	53.28	2nd place, silver medalist(s)	New Balance Nationals Outdoor, North Carolina A+T University	Greensboro, NC	June 20, 2015	
6	52.51	1st place, gold medalist(s)	GHSA Region 4-AAAAAA Championships	Marietta, GA	April 19, 2016	
7	51.67	4th	Pac-12 Championships, Hayward Field	Eugene, OR	May 13, 2017	
8	51.42	(bronze) (Heat 3)	USA Outdoor Track and Field Championships	Sacramento, CA	June 21, 2017	
9	50.99	(gold) (Heat 3)	Pac-12 Track & Field Championships	Stanford, CA	May 11, 2018	
10	50.63	2nd place, silver medalist(s)	Pac-12 Track & Field Championships	Stanford, CA	May 12, 2018	
11	50.35	1st place, gold medalist(s)	LSU Alumni Gold	Baton Rouge, LA	April 21, 2023	
