= Britton Wilson =

American athlete (born 2000)

Personal information
- Born: 13 November 2000 (age 25) Richmond, Virginia, U.S.
- Education: University of Arkansas

Sport
- Country: United States
- Sport: Track and field
- Event(s): 400 metres hurdles, 400 metres
- College team: Arkansas Razorbacks
- Club: Adidas
- Coached by: Chris Johnson

Achievements and titles
- Personal bests: 400 m hurdles: 53.08 (Eugene 2022); 400 m: 49.13 CR (Baton Rouge 2023); Indoors; 400 m: 49.48i AR (Albuquerque 2023)
Medal record
Women's athletics
Representing the United States
World Championships
Gold medal – first place	2022 Eugene	4 × 400 m relay
Gold medal – first place	2025 Tokyo	4 × 400 m relay

Britton Wilson (born 13 November 2000) is an American track and field athlete specializing in the 400 meters hurdles and 400 meters. She finished fifth in the 400 m hurdles at the 2022 World Athletics Championships, her major championship debut. Wilson became the North American indoor record holder for the 400 m dash with a time of 49.48 seconds, set on March 11, 2023, in Albuquerque.

She was the first North American woman to break the 50-second barrier and now the third woman ever under 49.50 s in the indoor 400 m. At the same meet in March 2023, she was part of the mixed nationality women's team that set the fastest indoor performance in history in the 4 × 400 m relay with 3:21.75. At the time, her split of 49.19 s was the fastest indoor split in world history. Wilson is a two-time individual NCAA Division I champion.

== Career ==
=== 2021–2022 ===
Initially a student at the University of Tennessee, Wilson switched to University of Arkansas in 2021 after suffering mental health issues. The change to Arkansas proved a catalyst to her most successful season as she won the 400 meters hurdles at the NCAA Division I Outdoors in June 2022 representing the Arkansas Razorbacks in a time of 53.86, finishing nearly a whole second ahead of second-placed Anna Hall. Prior to this Wilson had won both the 400 m hurdles and 400 m dash at the SEC Championships as well as helped the Razorbacks to third in the 4 × 400 m relay with a split time of 48.60, the fastest ever single lap in collegiate history.

She finished second in the 400 m hurdles to world record holder Sydney McLaughlin at the 2022 USATF Championships as McLaughlin broke her own world record. Wilson ran a personal best time of 53.08 as runner up. She was named in the American squad for the 2022 World Athletics Championships, where she placed fifth in the final in a time of 54.02 s.

=== 2023–present ===
Wilson's 2023 indoor season started with a collegiate indoor record in the 600 m with a time of 1:25.16, beating Athing Mu's previous best set in 2021. On March 11 at the NCCA Division I Indoors in Albuquerque, New Mexico (at altitude), she broke the North American indoor 400 m record by over half a second with the second-fastest mark on the respective world all-time list of 49.48 seconds, a time that would have been a world indoor record before February 19 when Femke Bol achieved 49.26 s. It was the fastest ever run by a collegian indoors or out as Wilson's mark bettered Mu's NCAA outdoor record (49.57). She added title for the 4 × 400 m relay with a 49.19 s anchor, the fastest indoor split in world history.

Britton showed no mercy to the collegiate record book about a month later again and eventually broke Mu's outdoor record too, clocking 49.51 s at the Tom Jones Memorial in Gainesville, Florida. She lowered her record to 49.13 seconds at the SEC Championships in Baton Rouge, Louisiana, a further month later, on May 13, to move up to fourth / eighth / 17th on the U.S. / NACAC / world all-time lists respectively. The 22-year-old won also the 400 m hurdles in 53.28 s just an hour later to achieve the best ever one-day such double.

Competing at the 2023 USA Outdoor Track and Field Championships, in Eugene, Oregon, she finished second in the final of the 400 m. A few days later on July 10, Wilson announced she would forego the rest of her NCAA eligibility and had signed a professional contract with Adidas. She was selected for the 2023 World Athletics Championships in Budapest in August 2023.

On 12 July 2025, having missed a year of racing due to a stress fracture, she won the 400 metres in 50.54 seconds at the Ed Murphey Track Classic, a World Athletics Continental Tour Silver event, in Memphis, Tennessee. She qualified for the final of the 400 metres at the 2025 USA Outdoor Track and Field Championships, running 50.25 seconds in her semi-final, before placing sixth in the final in 50.88 seconds. She was subsequently selected for the 2025 World Athletics Championships in Tokyo, Japan, where she ran in the women's x 400 metres relay.

== Achievements ==
=== Personal bests ===
Event	Time	Venue	Date	Notes
400 m hurdles	53.08	Eugene, OR, United States	June 25, 2022	
400 meters	49.13	Baton Rouge, LA, United States	May 13, 2023	CR, 4th U.S. all time
4 × 400 m relay split	48.60	Oxford, MS, United States	May 14, 2022	fourth leg, 1st collegiate all time
400 meters indoor	49.48 i	Albuquerque, NM, United States	March 11, 2023	A CR North American record, 2nd all time
4 × 400 m relay indoor split	49.19 i	Albuquerque, NM, United States	March 11, 2023	A, fourth leg, 1st all time
600 meters indoor	1:25.16 i	Fayetteville, AR, United States	January 13, 2023	CR
800 meters indoor	2:02.13 i	Fayetteville, AR, United States	February 17, 2023	

=== International competitions ===
Representing the United States
Year	Competition	Venue	Position	Event	Time	Notes
2019	Pan American U20 Championships	San José, Costa Rica	5th	400 m hurdles	58.19	
2022	World Championships	Eugene, OR, United States	5th	400 m hurdles	54.02	(sf: 53.72)
2022	World Championships	Eugene, OR, United States	1st	4 × 400 m relay	3:17.79	WL (49.39 split)
2023	World Championships	Budapest, Hungary	46th (h)	400 m	53.87	
2025	World Championships	Tokyo, Japan	1st (heats only)	4 × 400 m relay	3:22.53	WL (50.65 split)

=== National championships ===
Year	Competition	Venue	Position	Event	Time	Notes
Representing Central Virginia T&F Club / Mills E. Godwin High School
2016	NSAF Indoor Nationals	New York City	5th	400 m	57.02	SB
2016	NSAF Nationals	Greensboro, North Carolina	1st	400 m	54.30	SB
2017	NSAF Indoor Nationals	New York City	3rd	400 m	53.25	PB
2017	NSAF Nationals	Greensboro, North Carolina	7th	400 m	53.77	
2017	NSAF Nationals	Greensboro, North Carolina	25th (h)	4 × 100 m relay	48.18	
2017	NSAF Nationals	Greensboro, North Carolina	1st	4 × 200 m relay	1:39.58	
2018	NSAF Indoor Nationals	New York City	6th	400 m	54.70	(h: SB)
2018	USATF U20 Championships	Bloomington, Indiana	5th	400 m hurdles	57.95	SB
2019	NSAF Indoor Nationals	New York City	2nd	400 m	52.72	PB
2019	NSAF Nationals	Greensboro, North Carolina	1st	400 m hurdles	56.77	PB
2019	NSAF Nationals	Greensboro, North Carolina	31st	4 × 200 m relay	1:42.73	
2019	USATF U20 Championships	Miramar, Florida	1st	400 m hurdles	56.36	PB
Representing Tennessee Volunteers
2021	NCAA Division I Indoor Championships	Fayetteville, Arkansas	12th	4 × 400 m relay	3:36.60	
2021	US Olympic Trials	Eugene, Oregon	25th (h)	400 m hurdles	59.95	
Representing Arkansas Razorbacks
2022	NCAA Division I Indoor Championships	Birmingham, Alabama	6th	400 m	51.52	
2022	NCAA Division I Indoor Championships	Birmingham, Alabama	1st	4 × 400 m relay	3:27.23	
2022	NCAA Division I Championships	Eugene, Oregon	1st	400 m hurdles	53.86	
2022	NCAA Division I Championships	Eugene, Oregon	3rd	4 × 400 m relay	3:23.69	
2022	USATF Championships	Eugene, Oregon	2nd	400 m hurdles	53.08	PB
2023	NCAA Division I Indoor Championships	Albuquerque, New Mexico	1st	400 m	49.48	A CR AR
2023	NCAA Division I Indoor Championships	Albuquerque, New Mexico	1st	4 × 400 m relay	3:21.75	A CR (49.19 split)
2023	NCAA Division I Championships	Austin, Texas	7th	400 m hurdles	55.92	
2023	NCAA Division I Championships	Austin, Texas	2nd	400 m	49.64	
2023	USATF Championships	Eugene, Oregon	2nd	400 m	49.79	
Representing Adidas
