= Curtis Frye =

American track and field coach (born 1951)

Curtis Frye (born October 20, 1951, in Vass, North Carolina) is the head coach for the University of South Carolina Track and Field teams. He served as an assistant coach for the United States women's track and field team at the 2004 Summer Olympics in Athens, Greece.

Fry's coaching specialties are the hurdling events, sprints, and relays. These are also his areas of responsibility on the US Women's Olympic team.

Before coming to South Carolina, Frye was an assistant coach at East Carolina University, the University of Florida, North Carolina State University, and the University of North Carolina at Chapel Hill.

At Florida he coached Dennis Mitchell, who went on to win the bronze medal in the 100 meter dash at the 1992 Summer Olympics in Barcelona.

At North Carolina, he coached athletes such as Marion Jones and Allen Johnson. Johnson still trains with Frye in Columbia, South Carolina and is a volunteer assistant coach for the Gamecocks.

At South Carolina, some of his most successful athletes include Terrence Trammell, Demetria Washington, Miki and Lisa Barber, Otis Harris, Aleen Bailey, Lashinda Demus, Natasha Hastings and Tiffany Ross-Williams.

His teams have consistently finished high in the four NCAA championship events and the women team won the national title in the 2002 NCAA Women's Outdoor Track and Field Championship, the school's first NCAA Championship title. That year he was named the national coach of the year.

Frye also formed the Speed Elite, a group of high quality athletes like Johnson and Monique Hennagan, that have the goal to compete in and win national and international competitions.

Curtis Frye puts a high value on education and ensures that all of his student athletes graduate from college. Of the almost 200 individuals he has coached at the University of South Carolina, all but one have finished their undergraduate work and earned a degree from the school.

In 2015, Frye was investigated by South Carolina for allegations of assault by one of his players. He was given a light reprimand, and the player was allowed to sit out the next season without losing her scholarship.

On June 15, 2023, Frye announced that he was retiring, effective June 30 of that year.

== Achievements ==
- 2008 Order of Ikkos medallion
- 2002 Women's NCAA Championship
- 1999 & 2002 Women's Outdoor SEC Championship
- 1999 & 2002 USTCA Women's Outdoor National Coach of the Year
- 1999 USTCA Men's National Indoor Coach of the Year
- 1999 & 2002 SEC Women's Coach of the Year
- In 2002 coached athletes who won 7 NCAA titles and 4 gold and one silver medal at the World Junior Championships. In addition had 2 named National Athlete of the Years and 1 named Men's National Scholar-Athlete of the Year
- 2001 Nike Coach of the Year
- U.S. Men's Head Coach at 2001 Goodwill Games
- 1999 Assistant Coach for the US at the World Track and Field Championships
- 1997 USOC Track and Field Coach of the Year
- Assistant coach of 18 ACC Championship Teams
- Coached 6 Olympic medalists
- Coached 25 Olympians (that have won 11 medals)
- Coached over 60 NCAA Champions
- Coached over 415 NCAA All-Americans
- Coached over 100 SEC Champions
- Coached over 75 ACC Champions

== Sources ==
- Fry's Bio at GamecocksOnline.com
- Fry's Bio at USA Track & Field
