= Kennedy Simon (sprinter) =

American athlete

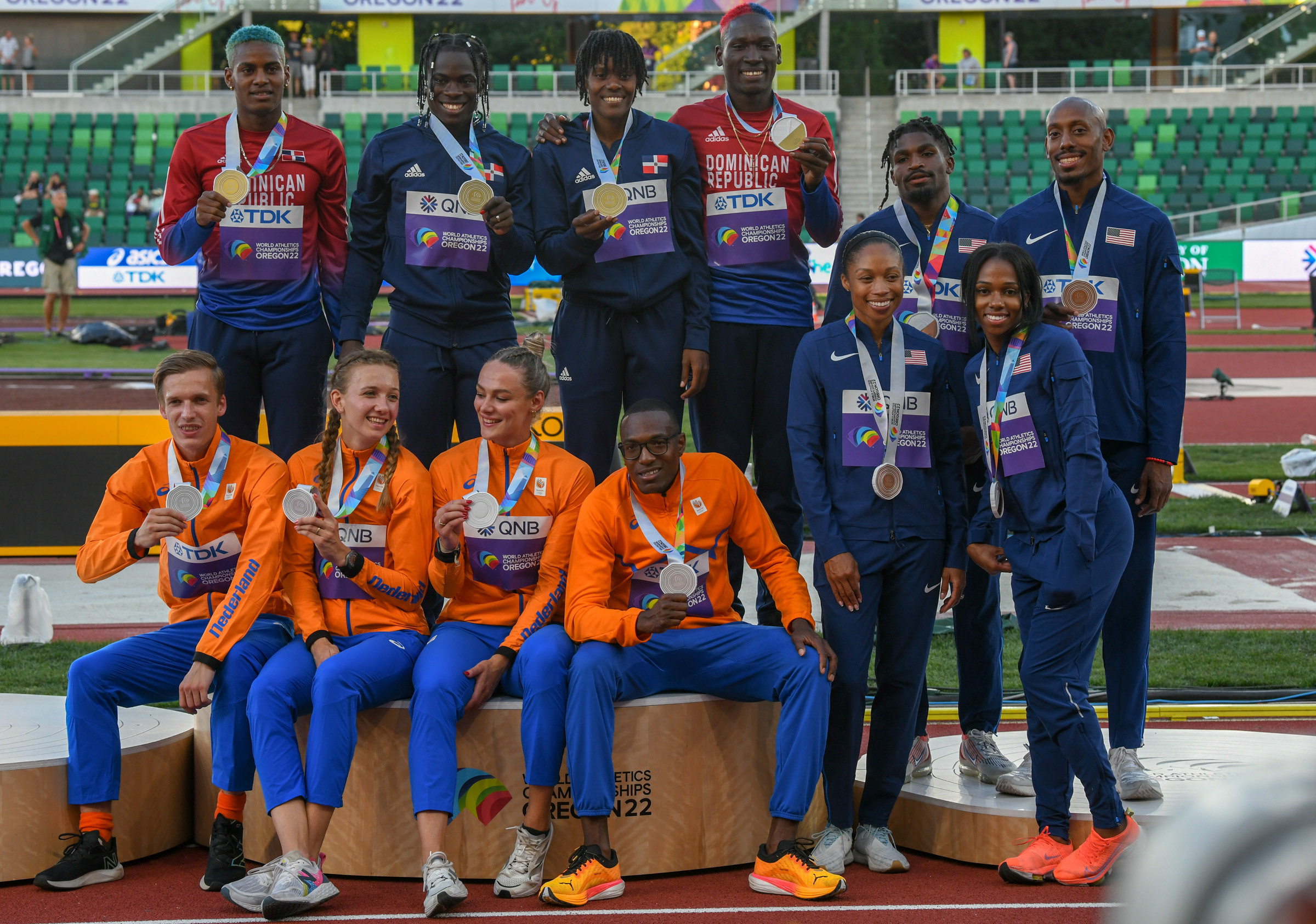
- Simon in 2022

Personal information
- Nationality: American
- Born: 12 February 2000 (age 26)

Sport
- Sport: Track and field
- Event: 400 metres
Medal record
Women's athletics
Representing the United States
World Championships
Bronze medal – third place	2022 Eugene	4×400 m mixed

Kennedy Simon (born 12 February 2000) is an American athlete who competes as a sprinter. She won a bronze medal in the mixed 4x400 metres relay at the 2022 World Athletics Championships, held in Eugene, Oregon.

== Early life ==
From Atlanta, Georgia Simon attended Westlake High School before attending the University of Texas.

== Career ==
Simon won on a bronze medal in the 2022 World Athletics Championships – Mixed 4 × 400 metres relay alongside Allyson Felix, Elija Godwin and Vernon Norwood.

Running for the University of Texas, she was one of a quartet, along with Julien Alfred, Rhasidat Adeleke, and Valery Tobias, that broke the collegiate record in the sprint medley, running 3:36.10 in April 2023 at the Texas Relays.
