= Tennessee Volunteers men's track and field =

Tennessee Volunteers track and field
- Founded: 1901
- University: University of Tennessee
- Athletic director: Danny White
- Head coach: Duane Ross (May 2022-present season)
- Conference: SEC
- Location: Knoxville, Tennessee, US
- Indoor track: Stokely Athletic Center (Until 2012) (Capacity: 12,700); New Indoor Track Facility (2023- )
- Outdoor track: Tom Black Track at LaPorte Stadium (Capacity: 7,500)
- Nickname: Volunteers or "Vols"
- Colors: Orange, white, and smokey gray

NCAA Indoor National Championships
- 2002

NCAA Outdoor National Championships
- 1974, 1991, 2001

NCAA Indoor Tournament Appearances
- 1966, 1968, 1969, 1970, 1971, 1972, 1973, 1974, 1975, 1976, 1978, 1979, 1980, 1981, 1982, 1983, 1984, 1985, 1986, 1987, 1988, 1990, 1991, 1992, 1993, 1994, 1995, 1996, 1997, 1999, 2000, 2001, 2002, 2003, 2004, 2005, 2006, 2007, 2008, 2009, 2011, 2013, 2015, 2016, 2017, 2018, 2019, 2021, 2022, 2023, 2024

NCAA Outdoor Tournament Appearances
- 1950, 1951, 1956, 1965, 1966, 1967, 1968, 1969, 1970, 1971, 1972, 1973, 1974, 1975, 1976, 1977, 1978, 1979, 1980, 1981, 1982, 1983, 1984, 1985, 1986, 1987, 1989, 1990, 1991, 1992, 1993, 1994, 1995, 1996, 1997, 1998, 1999, 2000, 2001, 2002, 2003, 2004, 2005, 2006, 2007, 2008, 2009, 2010, 2011, 2012, 2013, 2014, 2015, 2016, 2017, 2018, 2019, 2021, 2022, 2023, 2024

Conference Indoor Championships
- 1964, 1965, 1966, 1967, 1968, 1969, 1970, 1971, 1973, 1974, 1981, 1982, 1983, 1984, 1985, 1986, 1991, 1996

Conference Outdoor Championships
- 1964, 1965, 1966, 1967, 1968, 1969, 1970, 1971, 1972, 1973, 1974, 1975, 1976, 1977, 1978, 1981, 1982, 1983, 1984, 1985, 1986, 1991, 2001, 2002, 2007

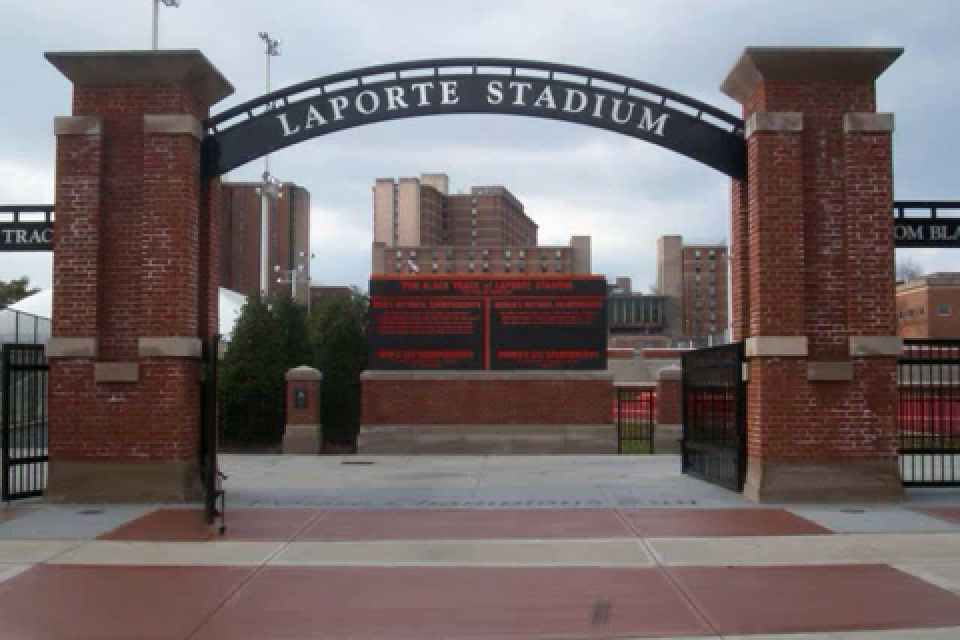
Tom Black Track at LaPorte Stadium is the home of the Tennessee Vols track and field teams.

The Tennessee Volunteers men's track and field program represents the University of Tennessee in the sport of track and field. The indoor and outdoor programs compete in Division I of the National Collegiate Athletic Association (NCAA) and the Southeastern Conference (SEC). The Vols host their home outdoor meets at the newly renovated Tom Black Track at LaPorte Stadium, located on the university's Knoxville, Tennessee campus. Their rich tradition of success features 4 national titles, 7 finishes as national runner-ups, 62 NCAA individual champions, numerous All-Americans, 25 Olympians, 43 SEC championships (a conference-leading 25 outdoor wins), and 109 combined scoring appearances in the NCAA indoor and outdoor championships. The team is led by current head coach Duane Ross who took over the program after Beth Alford-Sullivan in May 2022.

== History ==
The Tennessee Volunteers men's track and field program began in 1901 and first started intercollegiate competition in 1909 when the SIAA was formed. Records before the 1921 season were not kept, and are therefore incomplete. The Vols did not compete in the 1918 and 1919 seasons due to World War I. The team later joined the Southeastern Conference in 1933 where they have competed for the past 75 years. The sport was also kept on hold from 1943–1946 because of World War II and would later resume outdoor meets in 1947 and indoor meets in 1960.

Since the formation of the SEC the Tennessee Volunteers have been a consistent force in competition winning a combined 43 SEC titles, 3 NCAA Outdoor Track & Field Championships and 1 NCAA Indoor Track & Field Championship.

Several coaches are responsible for the historical success of the UT track & field program. Chuck Rohe finished with a record of 87–10 (.896) and won an astonishing 15 consecutive SEC titles. Stan Huntsman took over the program in 1971 and would continue the success started by Rohe. During his tenure he led the Vols to a record of 93-26-3 (.775), 20 SEC titles and won the program's first NCAA title. In 1986 Doug Brown became the 4th coach for the Vols track & field team and finished with a 53–8 (.869) record and won 4 SEC titles and 1 NCAA title. Bill Webb took the program over following the 1995 season and would finish with a 52–1 (.981) record and an unprecedented 4 SEC titles and 2 NCAA titles, becoming the first coach to win multiple national titles at Tennessee.

Christian Coleman became the first Vol to win The Bowerman, an award that honors collegiate track & field's most outstanding athlete of the year. In 2017, Coleman swept NCAA titles in the 60 meters indoors and 100 meters outdoors, setting collegiate records in both.

== Head coaches ==
#	Coach	Years	Seasons	National Championships		Conference Championships	
#	Coach	Years	Seasons	Indoor	Outdoor	Indoor	Outdoor
1	John Bender	1920	1	–	–	–	–
2	M. B. Banks	1921	1	–	–	–	–
3	A.W. Hobt	1922-1926	5	–	–	–	–
4	Bill Britton	1927-1935	9	–	–	–	–
5	Blair Gullion	1936-1938	3	–	–	–	–
6	John Barnhill	1939-1941	3	–	–	–	–
7	Sim Efland	1942	1	–	–	–	–
8	Walter Mehl	1947	1	–	–	–	–
9	Carlton Crowell	1948-1950	3	–	–	–	–
10	Louis Schneider	1951	1	–	–	–	–
11	John Sines	1952-1959	8	–	–	–	–
12	Ralph Patterson	1960-1962	3	–	–	–	–
13	Chuck Rohe	1963-1971	9	–	–	8	7
14	Stan Huntsman	1971-1985	15	–	1	7	13
15	Doug Brown	1986-1995	10	–	1	2	2
16	Bill Webb	1996-2009	14	1	1	1	3
17	J.J. Clark	2010-2014	5	–	–	–	–
18	Beth Alford-Sullivan	2015-2022	8	–	–	–	–
19	Duane Ross	2023-	2	–	–	–	–
Total				1	3	18	25

== Yearly Record ==
Season	Coach	NCAA		Conference	
Season	Coach	Indoor	Outdoor	Indoor	Outdoor
SIAA
1920	John Bender	–	–	–	14th
1921	M. B. Banks	–	–	–	–
1922	A.W. Hobt	–	–	–	6th
Southern Conference
1923	A.W. Hobt	–	–	–	3rd (14)
1924	A.W. Hobt	–	–	–	T-6th (9)
1925	A.W. Hobt	–	–	–	–
1926	A.W. Hobt	–	–	–	18th (1.5)
1927	Bill Britton	–	–	–	–
1928	Bill Britton	–	–	–	T-14th (5)
1929	Bill Britton	–	–	–	T-10th (7)
1930	Bill Britton	–	–	–	7th (16.5)
1931	Bill Britton	–	–	–	11th (6)
1932	Bill Britton	–	–	–	T-14th (5)
Southeastern Conference
1933	Bill Britton	–	–	–	T-5th (15)
1934	Bill Britton	–	–	–	6th (16.3)
1935	Bill Britton	–	–	–	T-6th (14)
1936	Blair Gullion	–	–	–	T-5th (21)
1937	Blair Gullion	–	–	–	T-8th (6)
1938	Blair Gullion	–	–	–	9th (5)
1939	John Barnhill	–	–	–	11th (2)
1940	John Barnhill	–	–	–	10th (5.167)
1941	John Barnhill	–	–	–	5th (17.5)
1942	Sim Efland	–	–	–	9th (8)
1943-1946 No Team
1947	Walter Mehl	–	–	–	8th (7.5)
1948	Carlton Crowell	–	–	–	T-9th (9)
1949	Carlton Crowell	–	–	–	T-6th (16)
1950	Carlton Crowell	–	T-32nd (2.1)	–	5th (28.3)
1951	Louis Schneider	–	41st (1/6th)	–	3rd (33)
1952	John Sines	–	–	–	4th (33.5)
1953	John Sines	–	–	–	T-3rd (25)
1954	John Sines	–	–	–	9th (7)
1955	John Sines	–	–	–	7th (16)
1956	John Sines	–	T-46th (1)	–	8th (13)
1957	John Sines	–	–	–	9th (9)
1958	John Sines	–	–	–	8th (18.82)
1959	John Sines	–	–	–	9th (7)
1960	Ralph Patterson	–	–	–	T-9th (1)
1961	Ralph Patterson	–	–	–	11th (5)
1962	Ralph Patterson	–	–	–	10th (2)
1963	Chuck Rohe	–	–	7th (0)	8th (7)
1964	Chuck Rohe	–	–	1st (41)	1st (61)
1965	Chuck Rohe	–	T-40th (4)	1st (50)	1st (72)
1966	Chuck Rohe	39th (1)	T-32nd (6)	1st (42)	1st (91)
1967	Chuck Rohe	–	T-5th (24)	1st (58)	1st (72)
1968	Chuck Rohe	6th (12.75)	T-14th (10)	1st (75)	1st (108)
1969	Chuck Rohe	T-4th (16)	9th (28)	1st (111)	1st (118.5)
1970	Chuck Rohe	T-4th (14)	13th (16)	1st (92.5)	1st (74)
^1971	Rohe/Huntsman	10th (8.25)	13th (16)	1st (80)	1st (148)
1972	Stan Huntsman	T-23rd (4)	T-10th (16)	2nd (62)	1st (154)
1973	Stan Huntsman	T-8th (8)	5th (24)	1st (80)	1st (190)
1974	Stan Huntsman	T-9th (7)	1st (60)	1st (69)	1st (207.5)
1975	Stan Huntsman	T-40th (7)	6th (60)	4th (33.5)	1st (215)
1976	Stan Huntsman	3rd (40)	3rd (40)	2nd (40)	1st (179)
1977	Stan Huntsman	–	14th (13)	2nd (54.5)	1st (168)
1978	Stan Huntsman	28th (6)	T-17th (4)	2nd (112)	1st (173)
1979	Stan Huntsman	T-4th (24)	T-11th (20)	2nd (106)	2nd (133)
1980	Stan Huntsman	3rd (38)	T-18th (11)	3rd (102)	3rd (87)
1981	Stan Huntsman	3rd (33)	3rd (50)	1st (140)	1st (156)
1982	Stan Huntsman	T-5th (23)	2nd (94)	1st (138)	1st (171.5)
1983	Stan Huntsman	5th (26)	2nd (102)	1st (127)	1st (121)
1984	Stan Huntsman	T-20th (8)	27th (19)	1st (114)	1st (112)
1985	Stan Huntsman	2nd (23)	T-9th (25)	1st (127)	1st (129.5)
1986	Doug Brown	10th (10)	T-21st (13)	1st (119)	1st (158)
1987	Doug Brown	T-26th (6)	T-27th (19)	2nd (110)	2nd (128.5)
1988	Doug Brown	51st (1)	–	3rd (97)	4th (88)
1989	Doug Brown	–	56th (3)	2nd (114)	4th (78)
1990	Doug Brown	T-13th (10)	T-11th (21)	2nd (92)	2nd (124.3)
1991	Doug Brown	T-31st (7)	1st (51)	1st (146)	1st (183)
1992	Doug Brown	35th (2)	2nd (46.5)	3rd (108)	2nd (149)
1993	Doug Brown	3rd (25)	4th (44)	2nd (81)	3rd (183)
1994	Doug Brown	2nd (40)	3rd (38)	2nd (87)	2nd (145)
1995	Doug Brown	2nd (26)	5th (31)	2nd (88)	2nd (155.5)
1996	Bill Webb	11th (19)	T-10th (19)	1st (92)	2nd (124.3)
1997	Bill Webb	T-10th (16)	T-47th (5)	3rd (71.5)	4th (88)
1998	Bill Webb	–	T-51st (4)	5th (108)	4th (149)
1999	Bill Webb	T-15th (15)	T-12th (22)	4th (81)	3rd (183)
2000	Bill Webb	13th (14)	15th (17)	5th (58)	3rd (107.75)
2001	Bill Webb	9th (19)	1st (50)	3rd (88)	1st (155.5)
2002	Bill Webb	1st (62.5)	2nd (57)	2nd (130)	1st (147)
2003	Bill Webb	5th (23)	T-7th (30)	4th (69)	2nd (111.5)
2004	Bill Webb	T-56th (2)	T-13th (20)	6th (60)	4th (108)
2005	Bill Webb	T-16th (14)	T-19th (14)	3rd (89)	3rd (109)
2006	Bill Webb	5th (25)	6th (30)	2nd (106)	2nd (126.5)
2007	Bill Webb	T-10th (21)	4th (31)	2nd (115.5)	1st (129.5)
2008	Bill Webb	5th (26)	13th (21)	3rd (99.5)	3rd (97.5)
2009	Bill Webb	38th (5)	48th (5)	3rd (78)	8th (53)
2010	J.J. Clark	–	45th (5)	10th (24.5)	9th (46)
2011	J.J. Clark	T-39th (5)	T-64th (1)	7th (46.3)	8th (49)
2012	J.J. Clark	–	T-56th (3)	7th (40.5)	10th (30)
2013	J.J. Clark	T-40th (5)	T-77th (.75)	T-8th (32)	T-11th (33)
2014	J.J. Clark	–	T-18th (12)	9th (34)	11th (24.5)
2015	Beth Alford-Sullivan	17th (11)	T-18th (10.5)	7th (48)	12th (28.5)
2016	Beth Alford-Sullivan	3rd (34)	6th (30)	8th (24.5)	9th (46)
2017	Beth Alford-Sullivan	T-10th (20)	T-7th (20)	10th (23.5)	T-9th (25.5)
2018	Beth Alford-Sullivan	T-53rd (3)	55th (3)	7th (44)	6th (65.5)
2019	Beth Alford-Sullivan	T-35th (7)	T-61st (1)	6th (50)	7th (68)
2020	Beth Alford-Sullivan	–	–	5th (67)	–
2021	Beth Alford-Sullivan	9th (21)	11th (21)	6th (50)	T-6th (67)
2022	Beth Alford-Sullivan	3rd (31)	3rd (34)	6th (50)	3rd (83)
2023	Duane Ross	11th (18)	T-22nd (11)	5th (54)	3rd (87)
2024	Duane Ross	T-44th (3)	T-37th (9)	T-8th (32.5)	6th (56)
Total		1	3	18	25

Note: The 2020 season was canceled after the SEC Indoor Championships due to the Coronavirus Pandemic, the SEC Outdoor and both NCAA Championships were not held.

^Chuck Rohe coached the 1971 team through the indoor season, while Stan Huntsman took over the program for the outdoor championships.

== NCAA Individual Event Champions ==
The Vols have claimed 26 NCAA Indoor individual championships and 36 NCAA Outdoor individual champions all-time.

Indoor
Year	Name	Event	Time/Mark
1968	Richmond Flowers	60y Hurdles	7.0
1969	Womble, Kelly, Hardy, McAlhaney	Mile Relay	3:14.6
1976	Preyor, Barlow, Harris, Morgan	Mile Relay	3:16.03
1979	Hunter, Barlow, Harris, Morgan	Distance Medley Relay	9:47.1
1980	Anthony Blair	440y	48.7
1982	David Patrick	880y	1:49.94
1983	Willie Gault	60y	6.18
1983	Willie Gault	60y Hurdles	6.98
1985	Sam Graddy	60y	6.12
1994	José Parrilla	800m	1:47.77
1994	Randy Jenkins	High Jump	2.31m (7-7)
1994	Lawrence Johnson	Pole Vault	5.82m (19-1.50)
1995	Tim Mack	Pole Vault	5.60m (18-4.50)
1996	Lawrence Johnson	Pole Vault	5.65m (18-6.50)
1997	Aaron Ausmus	Shot Put	19.01m (62-4.50)
1999	Leonard Scott	60m	6.58
2002	Justin Gatlin	60m	6.59
2002	Justin Gatlin	200m	30.63
2003	Gary Kikaya	400m	45.71
2003	Jabari Greer	60m Hurdles	7.55
2006	Aries Merritt	60m Hurdles	7.51
2008	Rubin Williams	200m	20.36
2016	Christian Coleman	200m	20.55
2017	Christian Coleman	60m	6.45
2017	Christian Coleman	200m	20.11
2022	Wayne Pinnock	Long Jump	7.92m (26-0)

Outdoor
Year	Name	Event	Time/Mark
1970	Bill Skinner	Javelin	82.49m (270-8)
1972	Willie Thomas	800m	1:48.72
1973	Doug Brown	3000m Steeplechase	8:28.1
1974	Reggie Jones	100y	9.18
1974	Willie Thomas	880y	1:48.72
1974	Doug Brown	3000m Steeplechase	8:35.94
1975	Reggie Jones	220y	20.60
1976	Young, Gardner, Morgan, Jones	4x100 Relay	39.16
1976	Phil Olsen	Javelin	83.26m (273-2)
1980	Horne, Wilson, Preyor, Blair	4x400m Relay	3:03.94
1981	Canady, Wilson, Preyor, Blair	4x400m Relay	3:03.08
1982	David Patrick	400m Hurdles	48.44
1983	Grady, Towns, Scott, Gault	4x100m Relay	39.22
1984	Sam Graddy	100m	10.25
1985	Terry Scott	100m	10.02
1991	Aric Long	Decathlon	7,916
1992	José Parrilla	800m	1:46.45
1992	Brian Brophy	Decathlon	8,276
1993	José Parrilla	800m	1:46.51
1993	Randy Jenkins	High Jump	2.28m (7-5.75)
1994	José Parrilla	800m	1:46.01
1994	Randy Jenkins	High Jump	2.31m (7-7)
1995	Lawrence Johnson	Pole Vault	5.69m (18-8.25)
1996	Lawrence Johnson	Pole Vault	5.81m (19-1)
1999	Tom Pappas	Decathlon	8,184
2001	Justin Gatlin	100m	10.08
2001	Justin Gatlin	200m	20.11
2002	Justin Gatlin	100m	10.08
2002	Justin Gatlin	200m	20.18
2002	Gary Kikaya	400m	44.53
2003	Stephen Harris	Decathlon	8,061
2006	Aries Merritt	110m Hurdles	13.21
2016	Jake Blankenship	Pole Vault	5.60m (18-4.5)
2017	Christian Coleman	100m	10.04
2017	Christian Coleman	200m	20.25
2022	Wayne Pinnock	Long Jump	8.00m (26-3)

== Conference Individual Event Champions ==
Tennessee Vol athletes have won a total of 174 SEC Indoor individual titles, and 228 SEC Outdoor individual crowns through the end of the 2024 season.

Indoor
Event	Titles
55-Meter Hurdles	5
60-Yard Hurdles	11
60-Yard Low Hurdles	1
55 Meters	6
60 Meters	4
200 Meters	6
400 Meters	5
600 Yards	9
800 Meters	12
1000 Meters	6
Mile	6
3000 Meters	11
5000 Meters	6
4x400-Meter Relay	8
4x800-Meter Relay	14
Distance Medley Relay	4
High Jump	11
Long Jump	5
Triple Jump	10
Pole Vault	18
Shot Put	9
Weight Throw	3
Pentathlon	3
Heptathlon	3

Outdoor
Event	Titles
110-Meter Hurdles	17
400-Meter Hurdles	4
100 Meters	10
200 Meters	12
400 Meters	4
800 Meters	19
1500 Meters	16
3000 Meters	6
3000m Steeplechase	11
5000 Meters	6
10000 Meters	10
4x100-Meter Relay	15
4x400-Meter Relay	9
High Jump	9
Long Jump	8
Triple Jump	9
Pole Vault	19
Shot Put	5
Discus	5
Hammer Throw	4
Javelin	15
Decathlon	15

== Tennessee Volunteer Olympians ==
Through the 2024 Summer Olympics, 29 Tennessee athletes have represented 9 different nations at the Olympic Games, winning a total of 5 gold, 4 silver, and 2 bronze medals.

=== Medalists ===
Athlete	Country	Olympics	Event	Medal
Christopher Bailey	United States	2024 Paris	4x400 m relay	Gold
Justin Gatlin	United States	2004 Athens	100 m	Gold
Justin Gatlin	United States	2004 Athens	4x100 m relay	Silver
Justin Gatlin	United States	2004 Athens	200 m	Bronze
Justin Gatlin	United States	2012 London	100 m	Bronze
Justin Gatlin	United States	2016 Rio de Janeiro	100 m	Silver
Sam Graddy	United States	1984 Los Angeles	4x100 m relay	Gold
Sam Graddy	United States	1984 Los Angeles	100 m	Silver
Lawrence Johnson	United States	2000 Sydney	Pole vault	Silver
Timothy Mack	United States	2004 Athens	Pole vault	Gold
Aries Merritt	United States	2012 London	110 m hurdles	Gold

=== Participants ===
Athlete	Country	Olympics
Jangy Addy	Liberia	2008 Beijing
Jangy Addy	Liberia	2012 London
Tavis Bailey	United States	2016 Rio de Janeiro
Doug Brown	United States	1972 Munich
Doug Brown	United States	1976 Montreal
Doug Brown	United States	^1980 Moscow
Christian Coleman	United States	2016 Rio de Janeiro
Christian Coleman	United States	2024 Paris
Tony Cosey	United States	2000 Sydney
Clément Ducos	France	2024 Paris
Anthony Famiglietti	United States	2004 Athens
Anthony Famiglietti	United States	2008 Beijing
Willie Gault	United States	^1980 Moscow
Trevor James	Trinidad and Tobago	1972 Munich
Paul Jordan	United States	^1980 Moscow
Paul Jordan	United States	1984 Los Angeles
Davonte Howell	Cayman Islands	2024 Paris
Gary Kikaya	Democratic Republic of the Congo	2004 Athens
Gary Kikaya	Democratic Republic of the Congo	2008 Beijing
Aric Long	United States	1992 Barcelona
Carey McLeod	Jamaica	2020 Tokyo
Carey McLeod	Jamaica	2024 Paris
Phil Olsen	Canada	1976 Montreal
Tom Pappas	United States	2000 Sydney
Tom Pappas	United States	2004 Athens
Tom Pappas	United States	2008 Beijing
José Parrilla	United States	1992 Barcelona
José Parrilla	United States	1996 Atlanta
David Patrick	United States	1992 Barcelona
Jah-Nhai Perinchief	Bermuda	2024 Paris
Leigh Smith	United States	2008 Beijing
Darryl Sullivan	United States	2020 Tokyo
John Tillman	United States	1992 Barcelona
Todd Williams	United States	1992 Barcelona
Todd Williams	United States	1996 Atlanta

^Did not compete due to boycott.

== See also ==
- Tennessee women's track and field
- Tennessee men's cross country
- Tennessee women's cross country
