= Tom Black Track at LaPorte Stadium =

Athletic stadium in Knoxville, Tennessee

- Tom Black Track
- Interactive map of Tom Black Track at LaPorte Stadium
- Full name: Tom Black Track at LaPorte Stadium
- Location: Knoxville, Tennessee, U.S.
- Coordinates: 35.95094°N 83.93222°W
- Owner: State of Tennessee
- Operator: University of Tennessee
- Capacity: 7,500
- Surface: Beynon
- Scoreboard: Daktronics
- Record attendance: 9,000 (1968, Tennessee v Villanova)

Construction
- Opened: 1966

Tenants
- University of Tennessee Volunteers men's and women's outdoor track and field teams (1966 - present)

Tom Black Track at LaPorte Stadium is home to the University of Tennessee Volunteers men's and women's outdoor track and field teams. It is located in the heart of the university's campus in Knoxville, Tennessee.

== History ==
Known commonly as Tom Black Track, the facility opened in 1966 after former Tennessee track and field coach Chuck Rohe spearheaded a drive to build a track facility for his program. The facility is named in honor of Tom Quay Black, a Knoxville businessman and snack foods entrepreneur whose company merged in 1960 with Tom's Snacks, and who was president of the University of Tennessee Development Council in 1966 and 1967. In 1965, he and his wife, Katherine Whitten Black, gave a $50,000 donation from their family foundation for construction of the track and stadium. The stadium around the track was later named in honor of the LaPorte family, whose donation contributed to improvements made to the facility.

The first competition at the track was a dual meet with Alabama on April 2, 1966.

The record attendance for the facility is 9,000 for a dual meet with Villanova on April 6, 1968.

== Events Hosted ==
Tom Black Track has been host to many important meets, including the Southeastern Conference Championships in 1967, 1969, 1978, 1986, 1993, 2003, 2010 and 2018; the USA Track & Field Championships in 1982 and 1994; and the NCAA Championships in 1969 and 1995, among many other significant meets. Tom Black Track also hosts the annual Tennessee Relays (formerly known as the Sea Ray Relays and the Dogwood Relays).

== Facility specifics ==
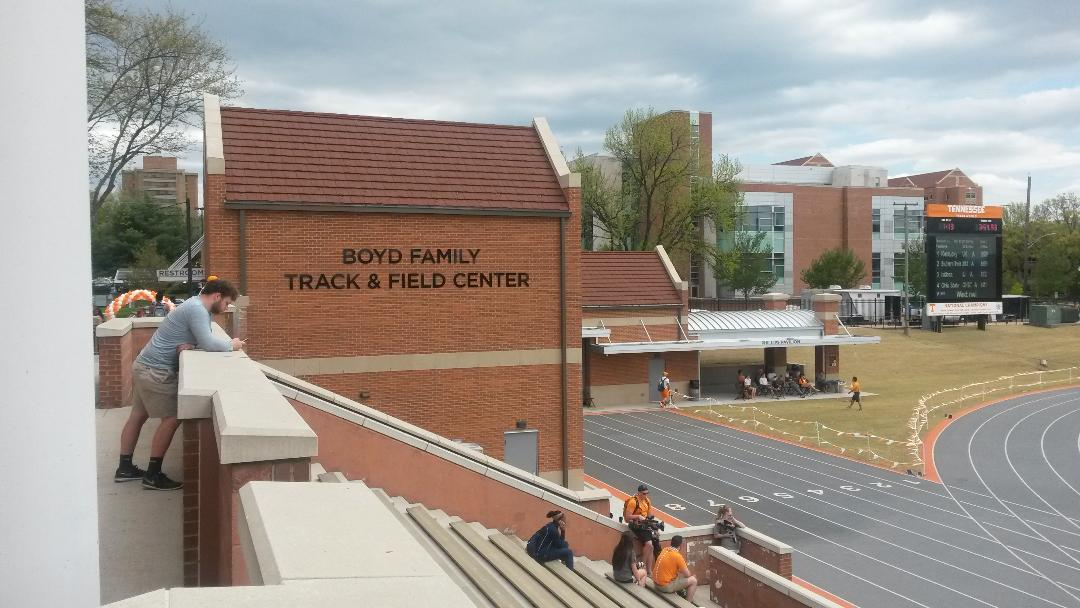
Boyd Family Track & Field Center

Tom Black Track features an eight-lane, all-weather running surface with all field events held inside the track oval. It has a Daktronics video/scoreboard and has lighting for night meets. Seating capacity for Tom Black Track is 7,500. Temporary seating for the 1969 NCAA Track & Field Championships boosted capacity to seat 10,000 spectators. The facility underwent renovation in 2015 and reopened in 2017 with a new surface by Beynon Sports Surfaces and many other improvements and modifications.

=== Boyd Family Track & Field Center ===
In 2018, the Boyd Family Track & Field Center opened at Tom Black Track. Named in honor of Tennessee graduates and track program benefactors Randy and Jenny Boyd and family, the facility provides the track program with new training, storage and meeting areas as well as new public restrooms and concessions area.

== Notable athletes ==
Notable University of Tennessee athletes who have competed at Tom Black Track

- Jangy Addy
- Alice Annum
- Tavis Bailey
- Sharrieffa Barksdale
- Jake Blankenship
- Darwin Bond
- Sarah Bowman
- Doug Brown
- Joetta Clark
- Christian Coleman
- Tony Cosey
- Kali Davis-White
- Anthony Famiglietti
- Benita Fitzgerald
- Richmond Flowers
- Justin Gatlin
- Willie Gault
- Sam Graddy
- Jason Grimes
- Anthony Hancock
- Ronnie Harris
- Jane Haist
- Lawrence Johnson
- Reggie Jones
- Gary Kikaya
- Karl Kremser
- Tim Mack
- Tianna Madison
- LaVonna Martin
- Aries Merritt
- Mike Miller
- Phil Olsen
- Tom Pappas
- José Parrilla
- David Patrick
- Chanelle Price
- Cathy Rattray
- Jonathan Sacoor
- Leonard Scott
- Terry Scott
- Leigh Smith
- DeeDee Trotter
- Dawane Wallace
- Delisa Walton
- Kelli White
- Todd Williams
- Darryal Wilson
