= Henry Patterson (high jumper) =

American high jumper (born 1975)

Personal information
- Full name: Henry T. Patterson Jr.
- Born: May 27, 1975 (age 51)
- Height: 196 cm (6 ft 5 in)
- Weight: 86 kg (190 lb)

Sport
- Country: United States
- Sport: Athletics
- Event: High jump

Achievements and titles
- Personal best: HJ: 2.32 m (1999)

Henry T. Patterson Jr. (born May 27, 1975) is an American former high jumper. He won the 1999 USA Indoor Track and Field Championships in the high jump, upsetting Olympic gold medalist Charles Austin. Patterson represented the United States at the 1999 World Championships and Pan American Games, finishing 7th in the latter competition. He was an All-American for the Toledo Rockets track and field team.

== Career ==
For Admiral King HS, Patterson ran track his freshman year but switched to baseball as a sophomore and junior after the track team was dropped for financial reasons. He returned to high school competition in 1993, as a senior coached by Tom Below. He jumped 6 ft 10 in (2.08 m) in his first meet back and was considered a state championship title contender. Patterson was also a football player, and was accepted to Oberlin College for both track and football. He instead competed for the Toledo Rockets track and field team.

As a Toledo freshman, Patterson finished runner-up at the 1994 USA U20 Outdoor Track and Field Championships. He qualified to compete at the 1994 World U20 high jump championships, advancing to the finals and placing 10th overall as the top American.

Patterson placed 11th at the 1995 NCAA Division I Indoor Track and Field Championships. The following year, he jumped 7 ft 3 1/2 in (2.22 m) to set a school record in the event.

He won the 1996 Penn Relays and placed 9th at the 1996 NCAA Division I Outdoor Track and Field Championships. Patterson competed at the 1996 United States Olympic trials, where he advanced past the preliminary round but did not record a height in the finals.

Patterson finished 5th in the high jump at the 1997 NCAA Division I Outdoor Track and Field Championships, earning his first top-eight All-America selection.

Though his primary event was the high jump, Patterson also competed in combined track and field events including the indoor pentathlon and decathlon at Toledo.

Patterson continued competing after graduation, winning the 1999 USA Indoor Track and Field Championships with a 2.30 m mark. He was described as relatively unknown going into the championships as he upset favorite Charles Austin. He was runner-up at the 1999 USA Outdoor Track and Field Championships, qualifying him to represent the United States at the 1999 Pan American Games and at the 1999 World Championships in Athletics. At the Pan American Games, Patterson finished 8th in the finals (later revised to 7th after the winner Javier Sotomayor was disqualified). At the World Championships, Patterson was 13th in the 'B' qualification group with a 2.20 m mark and did not advance to the finals. He was also 8th in the high jump at the 1999 Bislett Games.

In 2000, Patterson placed 6th at the 2000 USA Indoor Track and Field Championships and competed on the European circuit again, finishing 14th at the Golden Gala. He tied for 5th place at the 2000 United States Olympic trials and did not make the Olympic team.

Patterson was runner-up at the 2001 Millrose Games and took 6th and 3rd at the 2001 indoor and outdoor national championships respectively, but did not compete at that year's World Championships. He was 3rd at the 2002 Millrose competition and finished 4th at the 2002 USA Indoor Track and Field Championships in the high jump. He competed in the high jump at the 2002 Thorpe Cup but did not clear a height.

After failing to clear a height at the 2003 USA Outdoor Track and Field Championships, Patterson was runner-up at the 2004 USA Indoor Track and Field Championships. In his final Olympic qualification attempt, Patterson placed 5th again at the 2004 United States Olympic trials.

Patterson didn't clear a height at the 2005 USA Indoor Track and Field Championships but was 6th at the 2005 USA Outdoor Track and Field Championships. He competed at other meets in Ohio and Indiana through 2008.

Following his high jump career, Patterson became a long-distance runner, completing 30 marathon races.

== Personal life ==
Patterson attended Lorain Admiral King High School in Lorain, Ohio. At the University of Toledo, he majored in political science. He continued post-graduate studies at Cleveland State University and Cleveland-Marshall College of Law.

In 2000, Patterson married high school classmate Debra Patterson. They have three children.

In December 2005, Patterson was named to the Toledo Rockets hall of fame. He was also named to the Lorain Sports Hall of Fame and Lorain County Track and Cross Country Hall of Fame.

Patterson later became an assistant professor of political science at Lorain County Community College and was a lawyer for Giardini, Cook & NIcol, LLC. He also became a coach at Lorain High School.
