= Duane Ross =

American track and field coach and athlete

Current position
- Title: Director of Track and Field Programs
- Team: University of Tennessee
- Conference: Southeastern Conference (SEC)

Biographical details
- Born: December 5, 1972 (age 53); Shelby, North Carolina, U.S.
- Education: Clemson

Coaching career (HC unless noted)
- 2022–present: Tennessee
- 2012–2022: North Carolina A&T
- 2008–2012: Methodist University
- 1996: Clemson (assistant)

Accomplishments and honors

Championships
- MEAC Men's Track and Field Championship Indoor: 1 Outdoor: 1 MEAC Women's Track and Field Championship Indoor: 1 Outdoor: 1 Mason Dixon Conference Track and Field Championship Indoor: 1 Outdoor: 2

Awards
- USTFCCCA National Head Coach of the Year 2021 South/Southeast Region Coach of the Year (2011, 2012, 2019, 2020, 2021); Mason Dixon Conference Indoor Coach of the Year (2011); Mason Dixon Conference Outdoor Coach of the Year (2011, 2012)
Medal record
Men's athletics
Representing United States
World Championships
Bronze medal – third place	1999 Sevilla	110 m hurdles
United States Indoor Championships
Gold medal – first place	1998 Atlanta	60 m hurdles
Silver medal – second place	1999 Atlanta	60 m hurdles
Representing Clemson
NCAA Division I Outdoor Championships
Gold medal – first place	1995 Knoxville	110 m hurdles
NCAA Division I Indoor Championships
Bronze medal – third place	1994 Indianapolis	55 m hurdles

Randolph Duane Ross Sr. (born December 5, 1972) is an American collegiate track and field coach, and former athlete, specializing in the 110 meters hurdles. He is currently the Director of Track and Field programs for the University of Tennessee and is best known for winning the bronze medal at the 1999 World Championships in Athletics and representing the United States at the 2004 Athens Olympics. Ross also won the 1995 NCAA championship in the 110-meter hurdles, and as a 7-time All-American and 5 Time ACC champion is Clemson University's most decorated male hurdler.

== Biography ==
=== Early life ===
Ross was born in Shelby, North Carolina, and grew up in Dallas, North Carolina, where he attended North Gaston High School. At the encouragement of his Football coach, Ross took up track and field as a way to rehabilitate an injured ankle. As a junior, Ross went on to become the 1990 NCHSAA 3A state champion in the 110 metres Hurdles. After receiving a number of scholarships from various collegiate teams, Ross signed with Clemson University.

=== Athletic career ===
As a college athlete at Clemson University, he won the 110 m hurdles at the 1995 NCAA championships for the Clemson Tigers. He made his first appearance on the world track stage at the 1997 IAAF World Indoor Championships, where he finished fourth in the 60 meters hurdles competition, just behind compatriot Tony Dees. He returned at the 1999 IAAF World Indoor Championships in Maebashi, but again failed to reach the podium with another fourth-place finish, this time losing out to Falk Balzer. He had greater success outdoors that year, as he won the bronze medal in the 110 m hurdles at the 1999 World Championships in Athletics in his career personal best time of 13.12 seconds. An appearance at the 1999 IAAF Grand Prix Final, however, brought yet another fourth-place finish.

He was the runner up at the 2004 United States Olympic Trials and competed at the 2004 Summer Olympics in Athens, Greece. He failed to reach the final after running 13.30 seconds for fifth place in the semi-finals of the men's hurdles competition.

Following the analysis of information received from BALCO in 2010, Ross was called to testify in a case against his coach Trevor Graham. The U.S. Anti-Doping Agency (USADA) suspended Ross for two years for attempted use, possession, and trafficking of performance-enhancing drugs. As a term of his suspension, all his results from November 2001 onward were nullified.

=== Coaching career ===
He returned to Clemson as a volunteer coach and in 1996. After retiring from international competition, Ross was hired by Division III Methodist University as Head Coach of their Track and Field program. While at Methodist, Ross coached the women's team to three Mason–Dixon Conference championships and placed in the top four at both the NCAA Indoor and Outdoor Championships. Ross also earned USTFCCCA South/Southeast Region Coach of the Year honors. In 2012, after five seasons at Methodist, Ross was hired as director of track & field at Division I North Carolina A&T University. Under Ross, the Aggies swept both the men's and women's outdoor and indoor Mid-Eastern Athletic Conference championships for the first time in program history. Following the success of the 2017 seasons, Ross coached 13 athletes, more than any HBCU in history, who competed in the 2017 NCAA Division I National Championships.

In 2021, after leading North Carolina A&T's men's track and field team to a third-place finish at the 2021 NCAA Division I Outdoor Track and Field Championships, Ross was named 2021 NCAA co-coach of the year. Four athletes from the team went on to compete in the 2020 Summer Olympics, including Ross's son Randolph Ross and Trevor Stewart.

In May 2022, Ross was hired as the new head coach at Tennessee, signing a five-year contract for $450,000 annually.

== Statistics ==
=== Personal bests ===
Event	Time (sec)	Venue	Date
50 metres hurdles	6.36	Liévin, France	February 21, 1999
60 metres hurdles	7.42	Madrid, Spain	February 16, 1999
110 metres hurdles	13.12	Seville, Spain	August 25, 1999

=== 60m Hurdles progression ===
Year	Performance	Venue	Date	World ranking
1997	7.52s	Atlanta United States	1 March	—
1998	7.43s	Atlanta United States	28 February	—
1999	7.42s	Madrid Spain	16 February	—
2001	7.88s	Spala Poland	9 February	—

=== 110m Hurdles progression ===
Year	Performance	Venue	Date	World ranking
1993	13.74s (+ 0.9)	New Orleans United States	4 June	—
1994	13.48s	Philadelphia United States	30 April	—
1995	13.32s (+1.2)	Knoxville United States	3 June	—
1996	13.45s (+1.8)	Atlanta United States	21 June	—
1997	13.50s (-0.6)	Clemson United States	17 May	—
1998	13.24s (-0.5)	Dortmund Germany	7 June	—
1999	13.12s (+1.0)	Seville (La Cartuja) Spain	25 August	—
2000	13.53s (+0.2)	Chapel Hill United States	18 June	—

=== International competitions ===
Year	Competition	Venue	Position	Event
Representing United States
1997	World Indoor Championships	Paris, France	4th	60 m hurdles
1999	World Indoor Championships	Maebashi, Japan	4th	60 m hurdles
1999	World Championships	Seville, Spain	3rd	110 m hurdles
1999	IAAF Grand Prix Final	Munich, Germany	4th	110 m hurdles
2003	World Athletics Final	Monte Carlo, Monaco	DSQ (6th)	110 m hurdles
2004	Summer Olympics	Athens, Greece	DSQ (5th (semis))	110 m hurdles
2004	World Athletics Final	Monte Carlo, Monaco	DSQ (8th)	110 m hurdles

=== National competitions ===
Year	Competition	Venue	Position	Event
1995	NCAA Division I Outdoor Championships	Knoxville Tennessee	1st	110 m hurdles
1997	United States Indoor Championships	Atlanta Georgia	2nd	60 m hurdles
1998	United States Indoor Championships	Atlanta Georgia	1st	60 m hurdles
1998	US Outdoor Championships	Eugene, Oregon	DNF	110m Hurdles
1999	United States Indoor Championships	Atlanta Georgia	2nd	60 m hurdles
1999	US Outdoor Championships	Eugene, Oregon	4th	110m Hurdles
2000	US Olympic Trials	Sacramento, California	DSQ (semi)	110 m hurdles
2001	US Outdoor Championships	Eugene, Oregon	5th (semi)	110m Hurdles
2002	US Outdoor Championships	Eugene, Oregon	DSQ (4th)	110m Hurdles
2003	US Outdoor Championships	Eugene, Oregon	DSQ (DNF)	110m Hurdles
2004	US Outdoor Championships	Eugene, Oregon	DSQ (2nd)	110m Hurdles
2005	US Outdoor Championships	Eugene, Oregon	DSQ (19th)	110m Hurdles

=== Coaching record ===
Season	Team	Indoor Finish		Outdoor Finish		Notes
Season	Team	Conference	National	Conference	National	Notes
Methodist University Monarchs (Mason–Dixon Conference) 2008-2012
2009	Women's	7th	—	6th	—	
2010	Women's	4th	—	5th	10th	
2011	Women's	1st	4th	1st	3rd	
2012	Women's	2nd	4th	1st	4th	
North Carolina A&T Aggies (Mid-Eastern Athletic Conference) 2012–present
2013	Men	4th	—	5th	—	
2013	Women	8th	—	8th	—	
2014	Men	3rd	—	2nd	—	
2014	Women	12th	—	7th	—	
2015	Men	2nd	—	2nd	—	
2015	Women	3rd	—	5th	—	
2016	Men	2nd	—	2nd	—	
2016	Women	3rd	—	4th	—	
2017	Men	1st	—	1st	14th	
2017	Women	1st	—	1st	—	
2019	Men	1st	—	1st	15th	
2019	Women	1st	7th	15th	—	
2020	Men	1st	Championship not held	Championship not held	Championship not held	
2020	Women	1st	Championship not held	Championship not held	Championship not held	
2021	Men	Championship not held	5th	1st	3rd	
2021	Women	Championship not held	45th	1st	4th	
