= 1995 NCAA Division I Outdoor Track and Field Championships =

- Men's Champion: Arkansas (5th title); Women's Champion: LSU (9th title)
- Edition: 74th (Men); 14th (Women)
- Dates: May 31 – June 3, 1995
- Host city: Knoxville, Tennessee
- Venue: Tom Black Track at LaPorte Stadium; University of Tennessee

The 1995 NCAA Division I Outdoor Track and Field Championships were contested May 31 – June 3 at Tom Black Track at LaPorte Stadium at the University of Tennessee in Knoxville, Tennessee in order to determine the individual and team national champions of men's and women's collegiate Division I outdoor track and field events in the United States.

These were the 74th annual men's championships and the 14th annual women's championships. This was the Volunteers' second time hosting the event (although the first time hosting women's events) and first since 1969.

In a repeat of the previous three years' results, Arkansas and LSU topped the men's and women's team standings, respectively; it was the Razorbacks' fifth men's team title and the ninth for the Lady Tigers. This was the fourth of eight consecutive titles for Arkansas. The Lady Tigers, meanwhile, captured their ninth consecutive title and, ultimately, the ninth of eleven straight titles they won between 1987 and 1997.

== Team results ==
- Note: Top 10 only
- (H) = Hosts
- Full results

=== Men's standings ===
Rank	Team	Points
1st place, gold medalist(s)	Arkansas	61 1/2
2nd place, silver medalist(s)	UCLA	55
3rd place, bronze medalist(s)	LSU	38
4	USC	35
5	Tennessee (H)	31
6	George Mason	28
7	North Carolina	26 1/2
8	Baylor; Rice	26
10	Clemson; Georgia	25

=== Women's standings ===
Rank	Team	Points
1st place, gold medalist(s)	LSU	93
2nd place, silver medalist(s)	UCLA	58
3rd place, bronze medalist(s)	Georgia	41 1/2
4	Illinois	30 1/2
5	George Mason	29 1/2
6	Nebraska; SMU; Texas	27
9	Tennessee (H)	23
10	Wisconsin	21 1/2
