= 2020 NCAA Division I Outdoor Track and Field Championships =

College track and field competition

- Dates: June 10–13, 2020
- Host city: Austin, Texas; University of Texas at Austin
- Venue: Mike A. Myers Stadium
- Events: 42

The 2020 NCAA Division I Outdoor Track and Field Championships was scheduled to be the 99th NCAA Division I Men's Outdoor Track and Field Championships and the 39th NCAA Division I Women's Outdoor Track and Field Championships held at Mike A. Myers Stadium in Austin, Texas on the campus of the University of Texas at Austin. In total, forty-two different men's and women's track and field events were to be contested from Wednesday, June 10 to Saturday, June 13, 2020. On March 12, 2020, the event was cancelled by the NCAA due to the coronavirus pandemic.

== See also ==
- NCAA Men's Division I Outdoor Track and Field Championships
- NCAA Women's Division I Outdoor Track and Field Championships
