= Toledo Rockets track and field =

American college track and field team

- University: University of Toledo
- Head coach: Andrea Grove-McDonough (8th season)
- Conference: MAC
- Location: Toledo, Ohio
- Outdoor track: University of Toledo Outdoor Track
- Nickname: Rockets
- Colors: Midnight blue and gold

The Toledo Rockets track and field is the official team in track and field as the program represents University of Toledo. The Rockets compete in NCAA Division I as they are currently a member of the Mid-American Conference. The team is based in Toledo, Ohio, at the University of Toledo Outdoor Track.

The program is coached by Andrea Grove-McDonough. The track and field program officially encompasses four teams because the NCAA considers men's and women's indoor track and field and outdoor track and field as separate sports.

The university cut the men's track and swimming teams following the 2003 season. 38 men's track athletes were affected in the decision to save US$247,000.

Horizontal jumper Aaron Hopkins broke Jesse Owens' conference record in the long jump in 1966. He went on to become the school's first NCAA champion in track and field.

== Postseason ==
=== AIAW ===
The Rockets have had one AIAW All-American finishing in the top six at the AIAW indoor or outdoor championships.

AIAW All-Americans
Championships	Name	Event	Place
1970 Outdoor	Laurie Tucholski	440 yards	5th

=== NCAA ===
As of August 2025, a total of 4 men and 3 women have achieved individual first-team All-American status for the team at the Division I men's outdoor, women's outdoor, men's indoor, or women's indoor national championships (using the modern criteria of top-8 placing regardless of athlete nationality).

First team NCAA All-Americans
Team	Championships	Name	Event	Place	Ref.
Men's	1966 Outdoor	Aaron Hopkins	Triple jump	3rd	
Men's	1967 Indoor	Aaron Hopkins	Long jump	1st	
Men's	1968 Outdoor	Aaron Hopkins	Long jump	6th	
Men's	1980 Indoor	Doward Williamson	Mile run	6th	
Men's	1983 Indoor	Bryon Harris	55 meters	6th	
Men's	1997 Outdoor	Henry Patterson	High jump	5th	
Women's	2002 Outdoor	Briana Shook	3000 meters steeplechase	5th	
Women's	2004 Outdoor	Briana Shook	3000 meters steeplechase	2nd	
Women's	2006 Outdoor	Ebba Stenback	3000 meters steeplechase	8th	
Women's	2007 Outdoor	April Williams	Triple jump	8th	

== See also ==
- Category:Toledo Rockets men's track and field athletes (2)
- Category:Toledo Rockets track and field coaches (3)
