= Jackie Jeschelnig =

American hammer thrower (born 1979)

Personal information
- Full name: Jaclyn Jeschelnig-Ulm
- Nationality: United States
- Born: 19 November 1979 (age 46) Mentor, Ohio, United; States
- Height: 1.75 m (5 ft 9 in)
- Weight: 92 kg (203 lb)

Sport
- Sport: Athletics
- Event: Hammer throw
- College team: Ashland University
- Club: Ashland Elite Athletic Club
- Coached by: Jud Logan

Achievements and titles
- Personal bests: Hammer throw: 68.83 (2003)

Jaclyn "Jackie" Jeschelnig-Ulm (born November 19, 1979, in Mentor, Ohio) is an American hammer thrower. A graduate of Ashland University, she won five NCAA Division II and nine Great Lakes Intercollegiate Athletic Conference championship titles in both the hammer and weight throw, and achieved a thirty-ninth-place finish at the 2004 Summer Olympics. Jeschelnig also owned an outdoor personal best of 68.83 m (225 ft 9 3/4 in) by placing first at the 2004 Ohio State Relays Meet in Columbus, Ohio that secured her a spot on the U.S. track and field team for the Olympics.

== Career ==
Born and raised in Mentor, Ohio, Jeschelnig started her hammer throw career upon enrolling at Ashland University as a member of the track and field team for the Ashland Eagles under head coach Jud Logan. While competing for the Eagles, she compiled a record of fourteen titles throughout her four-year collegiate career; nine of which came from the Great Lakes Intercollegiate Athletic Conference (GLIAC)and five from the NCAA Division II Championships. Jeschelnig also posted an all-time NCAA Division II meet record of 64.86 m (212 ft 9 1/2 in) in the hammer throw and 20.53 m (67 ft 4 1/4 in) in the non-Olympic 20-pound weight, which garnered her as a ten-time NCAA All-American and as GLIAC's most valuable track and field athlete in 2002. On February 17, 2003, Jeschelnig was featured in Sports Illustrated's Face of the Crowd magazine issue.

After graduating from Ashland University in May 2003 with a mathematics major, Jeschelnig joined with eight other athletes for Ashland Elite's athletic program, which was devised to help Olympic aspirants undergo rigorous training for future track and field meets.

Jeschelnig entered the 2004 Summer Olympics in Athens on her official international debut, as a member of the U.S. Olympic track and field team, in the women's hammer throw, along with fellow athletes Anna Mahon and Erin Gilreath. Two months before the Games, she initially finished fourth at the Olympic Trials in Sacramento, California, but saved a permanent spot on the U.S. team for achieving an Olympic A-standard of 68.83 m (225 ft 9 3/4 in) from the Ohio State Relays Meet in Columbus, Ohio. Jeschelnig started her opening throw with a satisfying distance of 58.00 m, before committing a startling foul on her second attempt. She extended a remarkable toss to 62.23 m on her third attempt, but it was not worthily enough to put her through to the final, leaving Jeschelnig in last place among the Americans and thirty-ninth overall against a field of forty-eight hammer throwers at the end of the qualifying round.

== Personal life ==
Jeschelnig-Ulm resides with her husband and fellow thrower Richard Ulm and works as a Vice President at JP Morgan Chase Columbus, Ohio.
