= 2004 United States Olympic trials (track and field) =

- Dates: June 9–July 18
- Host city: Sacramento, California, U.S.
- Venue: Hornet Stadium
- Level: Senior
- Type: Outdoor
- Events: 40 (men: 20; women: 20)

The 2004 United States Olympic trials for track and field were held at Hornet Stadium in Sacramento, California. Organised by USA Track and Field, the ten-day competition lasted from July 9 until July 18 and served as the national championships in track and field for the United States.

The results of the event determined qualification for the American Olympic team at the 2004 Summer Olympics, held in Athens. Provided they had achieved the Olympic "A" standard, the top three athletes gained a place on the Olympic team. In the event that a leading athlete did not hold an "A" standard, or an athlete withdrew, the next highest finishing athlete with an "A" standard was selected instead.

The trials for the men's marathon were held February 7 in Birmingham, Alabama, the women's marathon were held April 23 in St. Louis and the trials for the men's 50 km race walk were held February 15 in Chula Vista, California.

== Medal summary ==
Key: ≠ Athlete without "A" standard, not selected.

=== Men ===
==== Men track events ====
Event	Gold		Silver		Bronze	
100 meters	Maurice Greene	9.91	Justin Gatlin	9.92	Shawn Crawford	9.93
200 meters	Shawn Crawford	19.99	Justin Gatlin	20.01	Bernard Williams	20.30
400 meters	Jeremy Wariner	44.37	Otis Harris	44.67	Derrick Brew	44.69
800 meters	Jonathan Johnson	1:44.77	Khadevis Robinson	1:44.91	Derrick Peterson	1:45.08
1500 meters	Alan Webb	3:36.13	Charlie Gruber	3:38.45	Rob Myers≠	3:38.93
5000 meters	Tim Broe	13:27.36	Jonathon Riley	13:30.85	Bolota Asmerom≠	13:32.77
10,000 meters^{[a]}	Meb Keflezighi	27:36.49 CR	Abdi Abdirahman	27:55.00	Dan Browne	28:07.47
Marathon	Alan Culpepper	2:11:42	Meb Keflezighi	2:11:47	Dan Browne	2:12:02
110 meters hurdles	Terrence Trammell	13.09	Duane Ross	13.21	Allen Johnson	13.25
400 meters hurdles	James Carter	47.68	Angelo Taylor	48.03	Bennie Brazell	48.05
3000 meters steeplechase	Daniel Lincoln	8:15.02 CR	Anthony Famiglietti	8:17.91	Robert Gary	8:19.46
20 km walk	Tim Seaman	1:27:08.00	John Nunn	1:28:20.00	Kevin Eastler	1:29:17.00

==== Men field events ====
Event	Gold		Silver		Bronze	
High jump	Jamie Nieto	2.33 m (7 ft 7 1/2 in)	Matt Hemingway	2.30 m (7 ft 6 1/2 in)	Tora Harris	2.27 m (7 ft 5 1/4 in)
Pole vault	Timothy Mack	5.90 m (19 ft 4 1/4 in)	Toby Stevenson	5.85 m (19 ft 2 1/4 in)	Derek Miles	5.80 m (19 ft 1/4 in)
Long jump	Dwight Phillips	8.28 m (27 ft 1 3/4 in)	Tony Allmond	8.10 m (26 ft 6 3/4 in)	John Moffitt	8.07 m (26 ft 5 1/2 in)
Triple jump	Melvin Lister	17.78 m (58 ft 4 in)	Walter Davis	17.63 m (57 ft 10 in)	Kenta Bell	17.58 m (57 ft 8 in)
Shot put	Adam Nelson	21.64 m (70 ft 11 3/4 in)	Reese Hoffa	21.14 m (69 ft 4 1/4 in)	John Godina	21.08 m (69 ft 1 3/4 in)
Discus throw	Jarred Rome	65.77 m (215 ft 9 in)	Ian Waltz	64.69 m (212 ft 2 in)	Casey Malone	64.47 m (211 ft 6 in)
Hammer throw	James Parker	77.58 m (254 ft 6 in)	A. G. Kruger	76.02 m (249 ft 4 in)	Travis Nutter	72.46 m (237 ft 8 in)
Javelin throw	Breaux Greer	82.39 m (270 ft 3 in)	Brian Chaput≠	79.81 m (261 ft 10 in)	Leigh Smith≠	76.38 m (250 ft 7 in)
Decathlon	Bryan Clay	8660	Tom Pappas	8517	Paul Terek	8312

==== Notes ====
^{a} As winner Meb Keflezighi chose not to compete in the 10,000 metres event at the Olympics, 22nd placed Dathan Ritzenhein, who had the "A" standard of 27:49.00 from a previous race, was included in the Olympic team.

=== Women ===
==== Women track events ====
Event	Gold		Silver		Bronze	
100 meters	LaTasha Colander	10.97	Lauryn Williams	11.10	Gail Devers	11.11
200 meters	Allyson Felix	22.28	Muna Lee	22.36	LaShauntea Moore	22.64
400 meters	Monique Hennagan	49.56	Sanya Richards	49.89	DeeDee Trotter	50.28
800 meters	Jearl Miles Clark	1:59.06	Nicole Teter	2:00.25	Hazel Clark	2:00.37
1500 meters	Carrie Tollefson	4:08.32	Jennifer Toomey≠	4:08.43	Amy Rudolph≠	4:08.57
5000 meters	Shayne Culpepper	15:07.41	Marla Runyan	15:07.48	Shalane Flanagan	15:10.52
10,000 meters^{[b]}	Deena Kastor	31:09.65 CR	Elva Dryer	31:58.14	Kate O'Neill	32:07.25
Marathon	Colleen De Reuck	2:28:25	Deena Kastor	2:29:38	Jen Rhines	2:29:57
100 meters hurdles	Gail Devers	12.55	Joanna Hayes	12.55	Melissa Morrison	12.61
400 meters hurdles	Sheena Johnson	52.95 CR	Brenda Taylor	53.36	Lashinda Demus	53.43
3000 meters steeplechase^{[c]}	Ann Gaffigan≠	9:39.35 CR	Kathryn Andersen≠	9:30.75	Carrie Messner≠	9:33.11
20 km walk	Teresa Vaill	1:35:57.00	Joanne Dow≠	1:38:42.00	Bobbi Chapman≠	1:39:01.00

==== Women field events ====
Event	Gold		Silver		Bronze	
High jump	Tisha Waller	1.98 m (6 ft 5 3/4 in)	Chaunté Howard	1.95 m (6 ft 4 3/4 in)	Amy Acuff	1.95 m (6 ft 4 3/4 in)
Pole vault	Stacy Dragila	4.75 m (15 ft 7 in) CR	Jillian Schwartz	4.55 m (14 ft 11 in)	Kellie Suttle	4.55 m (14 ft 11 in)
Long jump^{[d]}	Marion Jones	7.11 m (23 ft 3 3/4 in)	Grace Upshaw	6.83 m (22 ft 4 3/4 in)	Akiba McKinney≠	6.57 m (21 ft 6 1/2 in)
Triple jump^{[e]}	Tiombe Hurd	14.45 m (47 ft 4 3/4 in) CR	Shakeema Walker≠	14.06 m (46 ft 1 1/2 in)	Vanitta Kinard≠	13.73 m (45 ft 1/2 in)
Shot put	Laura Gerraughty	18.50 m (60 ft 8 1/4 in)	Kristin Heaston	18.10 m (59 ft 4 1/2 in)	Jillian Camarena≠	17.73 m (58 ft 2 in)
Discus throw	Aretha Hill	63.55 m (208 ft 5 in)	Stephanie Brown	61.90 m (203 ft 1 in)	Seilala Sua	61.60 m (202 ft 1 in)
Hammer throw^{[f]}	Erin Gilreath	70.42 m (231 ft 0 in) CR	Anna Mahon	69.23 m (227 ft 1 in)	Amber Campbell	65.98 m (216 ft 5 in)
Javelin throw	Kim Kreiner	55.65 m (182 ft 6 in)	Sarah Malone≠	54.22 m (177 ft 10 in)	Denise O'Connell≠	54.05 m (177 ft 3 in)
Heptathlon	Shelia Burrell	6194 pts	Tiffany Lott-Hogan	6159 pts	Michelle Perry	6126 pts

==== Notes ====
^{b} Deena Kastor chose to focus on the marathon and so was not entered in the 10,000 metres in Athens.
^{c} Women's 3000 metre steeplechase was not an event at the 2004 Summer Olympics.
^{d} As third placed Akiba McKinney did not have the "A" standard of 6.70 m, fourth placed Rose Richmond was included in her the Olympic team
^{e} Shakeema Walker and Vanitta Kinard did not have the "A" standard of 14.20 m, so sixth placed Yuliana Perez was included.
^{f} As third placed Amber Campbell did not have the "A" standard of 67.50 m, fourth placed Jackie Jeschelnig was included in the team.
