= 1998 USA Indoor Track and Field Championships =

- Dates: February 27–28
- Host city: Atlanta, Georgia, United States
- Venue: Georgia Dome
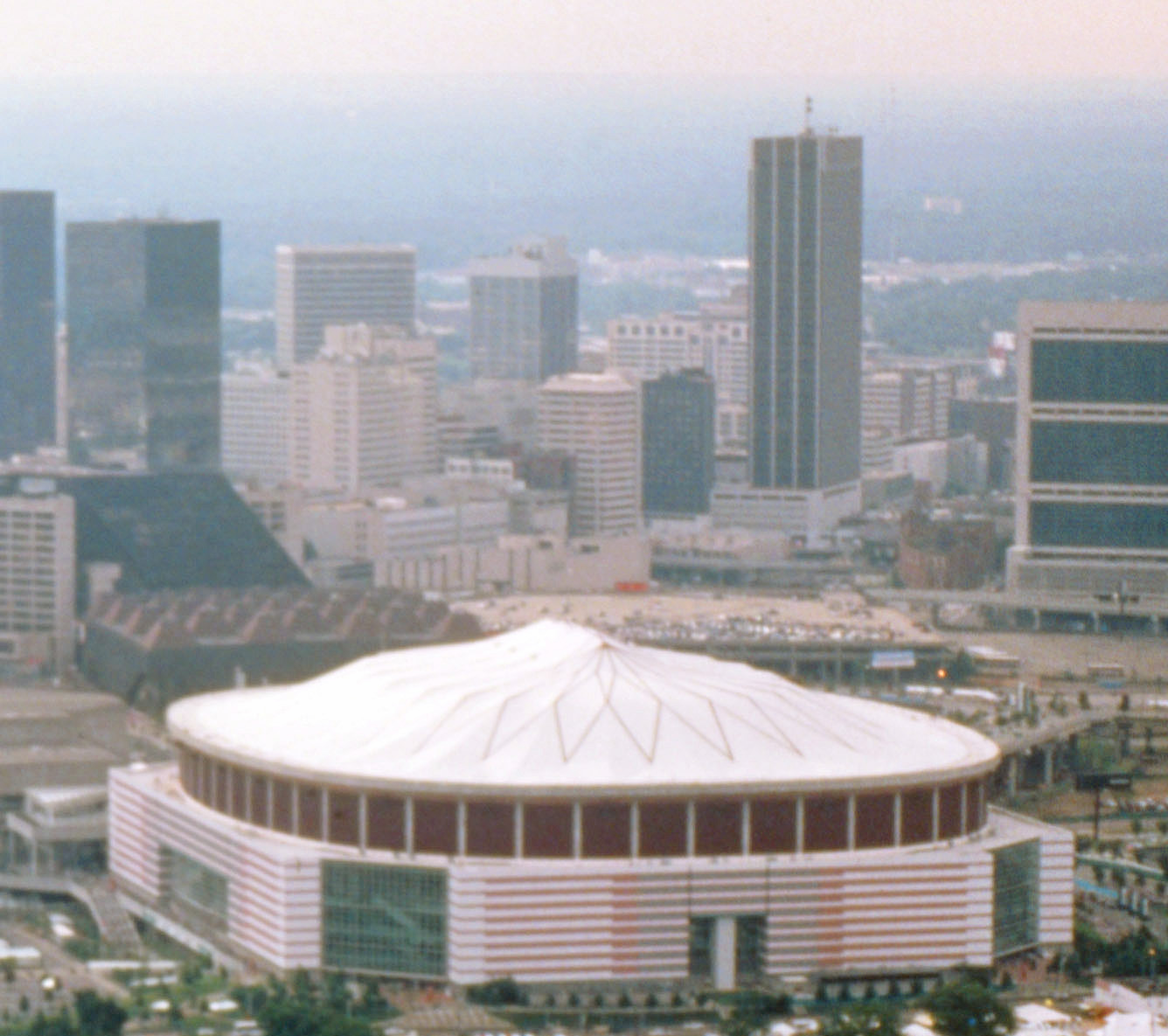
- Level: Senior
- Type: Indoor
- Events: 28 (14 men's + 14 women's)

The 1998 USA Indoor Track and Field Championships were held at the Georgia Dome in Atlanta, Georgia. Organized by USA Track and Field (USATF), the two-day competition took place February 27–28 and served as the national championships in indoor track and field for the United States. The championships in combined track and field events were held at a different date.

The meeting was noted for having many members of the Clark family present, including Joetta Clark and Jearl Miles-Clark.

== Medal summary ==
=== Men ===
| Event | Gold | | Silver | Bronze |
|---|---|---|---|---|
| 60 m | Kenny Brokenburr | 6.52 | | |
| 200 m | Ramon Clay | 20.42 | | |
| 400 m | Alvin Harrison | 45.05 | | |
| 800 m | Mark Everett | 1:47.84 | | |
| Mile run | Paul McMullen | 3:55.84 | | |
| 3000 m | Dan Browne | 7:50.49 | | |
| 60 m hurdles | Duane Ross | 7.43 | | |
| High jump | Sam Hill | 2.30 m | | |
| Pole vault | Scott Hennig | 5.75 m | | |
| Long jump | Roland McGhee | 8.11 m | | |
| Triple jump | Von Ware | 16.72 m | | |
| Shot put | John Godina | 21.30 m | | |
| Weight throw | Lance Deal | 24.21 m | | |
| 5000 m walk | Tim Seaman | 19:54.36 | | |
| Heptathlon | Ricky Barker | 5867 pts | | |

=== Women ===
| Event | Gold | | Silver | | Bronze | |
|---|---|---|---|---|---|---|
| 60 m | Christy Opara (NGR) | 7.08 | Carlette Guidry | 7.15 | Chryste Gaines | 7.15 |
| 200 m | Tameka Roberts | 23.04 | | | | |
| 400 m | Jearl Miles Clark | 51.11 | | | | |
| 800 m | Joetta Clark | 2:02.40 | | | | |
| Mile run | Suzy Favor Hamilton | 4:34.16 | | | | |
| 3000 m | Elva Dryer | 8:58.87 | | | | |
| 60 m hurdles | Melissa Morrison | 7.87 | | | | |
| High jump | Tisha Waller | 2.01 m | | | | |
| Pole vault | Stacy Dragila | 4.30 m | | | | |
| Long jump | Dawn Burrell | 6.92 m | | | | |
| Triple jump | Niambi Dennis | 13.55 m | | | | |
| Shot put | Connie Price-Smith | 18.38 m | | | | |
| Weight throw | Dawn Ellerbe | 21.42 m | | | | |
| 3000 m walk | Michelle Rohl | 12:40.38 | | | | |
