= 1969 NCAA University Division outdoor track and field championships =

1969 NCAA University Division Outdoor Track and Field Championships
- Team Champions: San José State (1st title)
- Edition: 48th
- Dates: June 19−21, 1969
- Host city: Knoxville, Tennessee
- Venue: Tom Black Track at LaPorte Stadium; University of Tennessee

The 1969 NCAA University Division Outdoor Track and Field Championships were contested June 19−21 at the 48th annual NCAA-sanctioned track meet to determine the individual and team national champions of men's collegiate University Division outdoor track and field events in the United States.

This year's outdoor meet was hosted by the University of Tennessee at Tom Black Track at LaPorte Stadium in Knoxville.

San José State finished atop the team standings, claiming their first team national title.

== Team result ==
- Note: Top 10 only
- (H) = Hosts

| Rank | Team | Points |
|---|---|---|
| 1st place, gold medalist(s) | San José State | 48 |
| 2nd place, silver medalist(s) | Kansas | 45 |
| 3rd place, bronze medalist(s) | Oregon State; Washington State | 40 |
| 4 | UCLA | 39 |
| 5 | Villanova | 35 |
| 6 | BYU | 34 |
| 7 | USC | 33 |
| 8 | Tennessee (H) | 28 |
| 9 | Maryland; Oregon; Yale | 18 |
| 10 | Rice; Texas A&M | 16 |
