= Tavis Bailey =

American discus thrower

Personal information
- Born: January 6, 1992 (age 34) Poughkeepsie, New York, U.S.
- Height: 6 ft 3 in (1.91 m)
- Weight: 295 lb (134 kg)

Sport
- Sport: Discus throw
- College team: Tennessee

Achievements and titles
- Personal best: DT: 65.82 m (2016)

Tavis Bailey (born June 1, 1992) is an American discus thrower.

== Personal ==
Bailey was born in Poughkeepsie, New York. He attended A.L. Brown High School in Kannapolis, North Carolina. In 2010, he won the NCHSAA 3A state championship in the discus throw. After high school, he received a scholarship to play football and compete on the track team at Lenoir–Rhyne University. In 2012, he transferred to the University of Tennessee, where he finished out his collegiate career.

== Career ==
=== College ===
In 2012, during his first year at Tennessee, he placed second in the discus throw at the SEC Outdoor Championships. He was the national runner-up discus thrower at the 2015 NCAA Outdoor Championships.

=== Professional ===
Bailey qualified for the 2016 Summer Olympics, by placing second at the 2016 US Olympic Trials with a throw of 63.42 meters.
