= John Sines =

American basketball player and coach

Personal information
- Born: August 13, 1914 Flora, Indiana, U.S.
- Died: April 16, 1978 (aged 63) Manatee County, Florida, U.S.
- Listed height: 6 ft 1 in (1.85 m)
- Listed weight: 190 lb (86 kg)

Career information
- High school: Jefferson (Lafayette, Indiana)
- College: Purdue (1935–1938)
- Playing career: 1938–1944
- Position: Forward
- Coaching career: 1946–1977

Career history

Playing
- 1938–1942: Indianapolis Kautskys
- 1943–1944: Indianapolis Pure Oils
- 1944: Dayton Bombers

Coaching
- 1946–1951: Lawrence
- 1951–1959: Tennessee (assistant)
- 1959–1962: Tennessee
- 1963–1964: Palmetto HS
- 1964–1977: Manatee CC

Career highlights
- All-NBL First Team (1939)

John Alfred Sines (August 13, 1914 – April 16, 1978) was an American professional basketball player as well as head coach at the high school and college levels. After his collegiate career at Purdue University, Sines played for the Indianapolis Kautskys in the National Basketball League for several seasons and averaged 7.2 points per game.

Sines served in the Navy during World War II. A couple years later he began coaching, with his first job being the head coach for Lawrence University from 1946 to 1951, compiling an overall record of 47–42. He then moved on to the University of Tennessee from 1951 to 1959 as an assistant coach. When then-head coach Emmett Lowery moved on, Sines was promoted to be the Volunteers' new head coach. He spent three seasons leading the team, compiling only a 26–45 overall record in that span. He resigned in 1962 after two players were caught being involved in a gambling scandal.

Sines moved to Palmetto, Florida and coached Palmetto High School's basketball team for one season (1963–64) before being hired by Manatee Community College. At Manatee, he coached from 1964 to 1977 before retiring.

== Head coaching record ==
=== College ===
Record table
Season	Team	Overall	Conference	Standing	Postseason
Lawrence Vikings (Midwest Collegiate Athletic Conference) (1946–1951)
1946–47	Lawrence	10–7	4–6		
1947–48	Lawrence	10–11	4–6		
1948–49	Lawrence	9–7	4–4		
1949–50	Lawrence	9–8	3–5		
1950–51	Lawrence	9–9	3–6		
Lawrence:		47–42	18–27		
Tennessee Volunteers (Southeastern Conference) (1959–1962)
1959–60	Tennessee	12–11	7–7	6th	
1960–61	Tennessee	10–15	4–10	11th	
1961–62	Tennessee	4–19	2–12	12th	
Tennessee:		26–45	13–29		
Total:		73–87			
