= 1999 USA Indoor Track and Field Championships =

- Dates: February 26–27
- Host city: Atlanta, Georgia, United States
- Venue: Georgia Dome
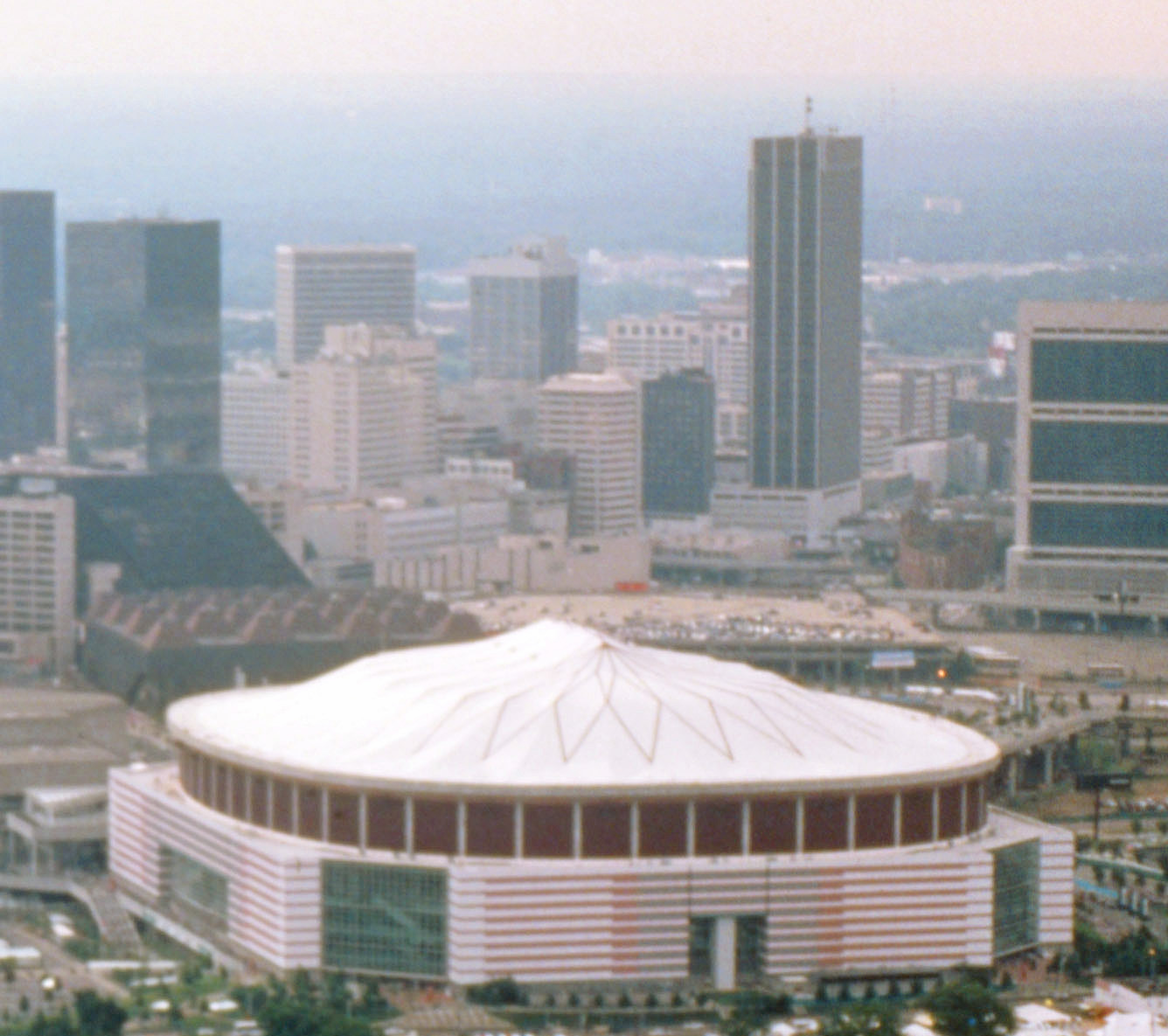
- Level: Senior
- Type: Indoor
- Events: 29 (15 men's + 14 women's)

The 1999 USA Indoor Track and Field Championships were held at the Georgia Dome in Atlanta, Georgia. Organized by USA Track and Field (USATF), the two-day competition took place February 26–27 and served as the national championships in indoor track and field for the United States. The championships in combined track and field events were held at a different time.

The competition was a qualifier for the U.S. team at the 1999 World Indoor Championships in Athletics. At the meeting, Rohsaan Griffin set an American record in the 200 metres despite stumbling.

== Medal summary ==
=== Men ===
Event	Gold		Silver	Bronze
60 m	Tim Harden	6.44		
200 m	Rohsaan Griffin	20.32		
400 m	Angelo Taylor	45.50		
800 m	Khadevis Robinson	1:48.60		
Mile run	Matt Holthaus	4:04.00		
3000 m	Adam Goucher	7:46.06		
60 m hurdles	Reggie Torian	7.38		
High jump	Henry Patterson	2.30 m		
Pole vault	Jeff Hartwig	5.92 m		
Long jump	Kareem Streete-Thompson	8.15 m		
Triple jump	LaMark Carter	16.93 m		
Shot put	Andy Bloom	20.82 m		
Weight throw	Lance Deal	23.76 m		
Heptathlon	Trafton Rodgers	6044 pts		
5000 m walk	Tim Seaman	19:45.04		

=== Women ===
Event	Gold		Silver	Bronze
60 m	Gail Devers	7.04		
200 m	Zundra Feagin-Alexander	23.29		
400 m	Jearl Miles Clark	51.97		
800 m	Meredith Valmon (Rainey)	2:00.55		
1500 m	Suzy Favor Hamilton	4:13.96		
3000 m	Regina Jacobs	9:06.52		
60 m hurdles	Melissa Morrison	7.85		
High jump	Tisha Waller	1.96 m		
Pole vault	Stacy Dragila	4.45 m		
Long jump	Shana Williams	6.70 m		
Triple jump	Cynthea Rhodes	13.80 m		
Shot put	Teri Tunks	18.91 m		
Weight throw	Dawn Ellerbe	22.76 m		
3000 m walk	Joanne Dow	12:44.90		
