= Tony Cosey =

American long-distance runner (born 1974)

Personal information
- Full name: Anthony E. Cosey
- Born: October 5, 1974 (age 52) Knoxville, Tennessee, U.S.

Sport
- Country: United States
- Sport: Athletics
- Event: Steeplechase

Anthony E. Cosey (born October 5, 1974) is a steeplechase Olympian and retired American long-distance runner.

He finished 36th at the 1999 World Cross Country Championships (long race) and 39th at the 2001 World Cross Country Championships (short race), and placed lowly in 2002 (short race). He also competed at the 2000 Summer Olympics in Sydney, in the men's 3000 metres steeplechase, without reaching the final.

His personal best times were 7:54.67 minutes in the 3000 metres, achieved in February 1999 in Indianapolis (indoor); 13:51.03 minutes in the 5000 metres, achieved in May 2001 in Palo Alto; and 8:21.41 minutes in the 3000 metres steeplechase, achieved in July 2000 in Sacramento.

Cosey was born in Knoxville, Tennessee. He competed for the Tennessee Volunteers men's track and field team in the NCAA.

Currently, Tony Cosey owns Cosey Financial Services, Inc. in Knoxville, Tennessee and coaches nationally and state ranked high school track and cross country runners.
