= Toledo Rockets =

Intercollegiate sports teams of the University of Toledo

- University: University of Toledo
- Nickname: Rockets
- NCAA: Division I (FBS)
- Conference: Mid-American
- Athletic director: Bryan B. Blair
- Location: Toledo, Ohio, U.S.
- Varsity teams: 16
- Football stadium: Glass Bowl
- Basketball arena: Savage Arena
- Baseball stadium: Scott Park Baseball Complex
- Colors: Midnight blue and gold
- Mascot: Rocky the Rocket
- Fight song: U of Toledo
- Website: utrockets.com

The Toledo Rockets is a brand of programs for intercollegiate athletic teams that represent The University of Toledo. The Rockets compete at the National Collegiate Athletic Association (NCAA) Division I level as a member of the Mid-American Conference (MAC). The school's colors are midnight blue and gold.

Toledo's most principal rivals are the Falcons of Bowling Green State University. The two teams play for a trophy each year known as the Peace Pipe, a prize that originated in basketball but progressed to football in 1980. This rivalry is sometimes known as "The Battle for I-75" because the cities of Toledo and Bowling Green are located just off Interstate 75 and only 20 miles separate the two campuses.

== Origin of nickname ==
The sports teams of Toledo University were originally referenced as the Blue and Gold, Munies (for municipal university), and Dwyer's Boys (after head football coach James Dwyer) prior to 1923.

In a 1923 football match with favored Carnegie Tech, reporters from Pittsburgh learned that Toledo did not have a nickname. They pressed James E. Neal, a staff writer for The Campus Collegian in the press box, to come up with a nickname for his school's team. William B. Hook, a substitute guard for Toledo, grabbed a Carnegie fumble and ran 99 yards for a touchdown. While Toledo suffered a 32–12 loss, Neal labeled the team "Skyrockets" for their efforts against the favored team. Sportswriters noted that Hook looked more like a rocket than a skyrocket on his fumble return, as Carnegie Tech players failed to tackle him. Some stories began to reference the name "Rockets" with quotation marks. One week later, quotation marks were dropped and Toledo's nickname became the Rockets.

== Sports sponsored ==
A member of the Mid-American Conference, Toledo sponsors teams in six men's and ten women's NCAA sanctioned sports. Women's rowing was officially added in during the 2025–26 season.

Mid-American Conference logo in the Toledo Rockets colors

Men's sports	Women's sports
Baseball	Basketball
Basketball	Cross country
Cross country	Golf
Football	Rowing (Note: started during the 2025–26 school year.)
Golf	Soccer
Ice hockey	Softball
Tennis	Tennis
	Track and field^{1}
	Volleyball
^{1} – includes both indoor and outdoor.

== Rivalry ==
The Bowling Green State University Falcons have been the Rockets' biggest rival, dating back to 1919. In 1935, UT beat the Falcons in a 63–0 blowout, and the Toledo fans went crazy causing an outbreak of riots and damage. As a result, Bowling Green removed Toledo from their athletic play list until the 1947 season.

When the Rockets resumed play against Bowling Green, the Peace Pipe was instituted as a basketball award. There allegedly used to be a ceremony involving journalistic organizations from Toledo and Bowling Green at halftime of one of the UT-BG basketball games every year. Representatives from each school's newspaper smoked a six-foot peace pipe, carved from wood, with the winning school keeping the pipe until the next season. Unfortunately in 1969, the tradition came to an abrupt end when the pipe was stolen from its resting-place in the Collegian office. The thief was never caught, nor was the pipe ever recovered. The tradition was reinstated in 1980 for football with a miniature peace pipe replica resting atop a trophy created by Frank Kralik, former UT football player, as an award for the winner of the annual football game between Toledo and Bowling Green.

== Facilities ==
=== The Glass Bowl ===
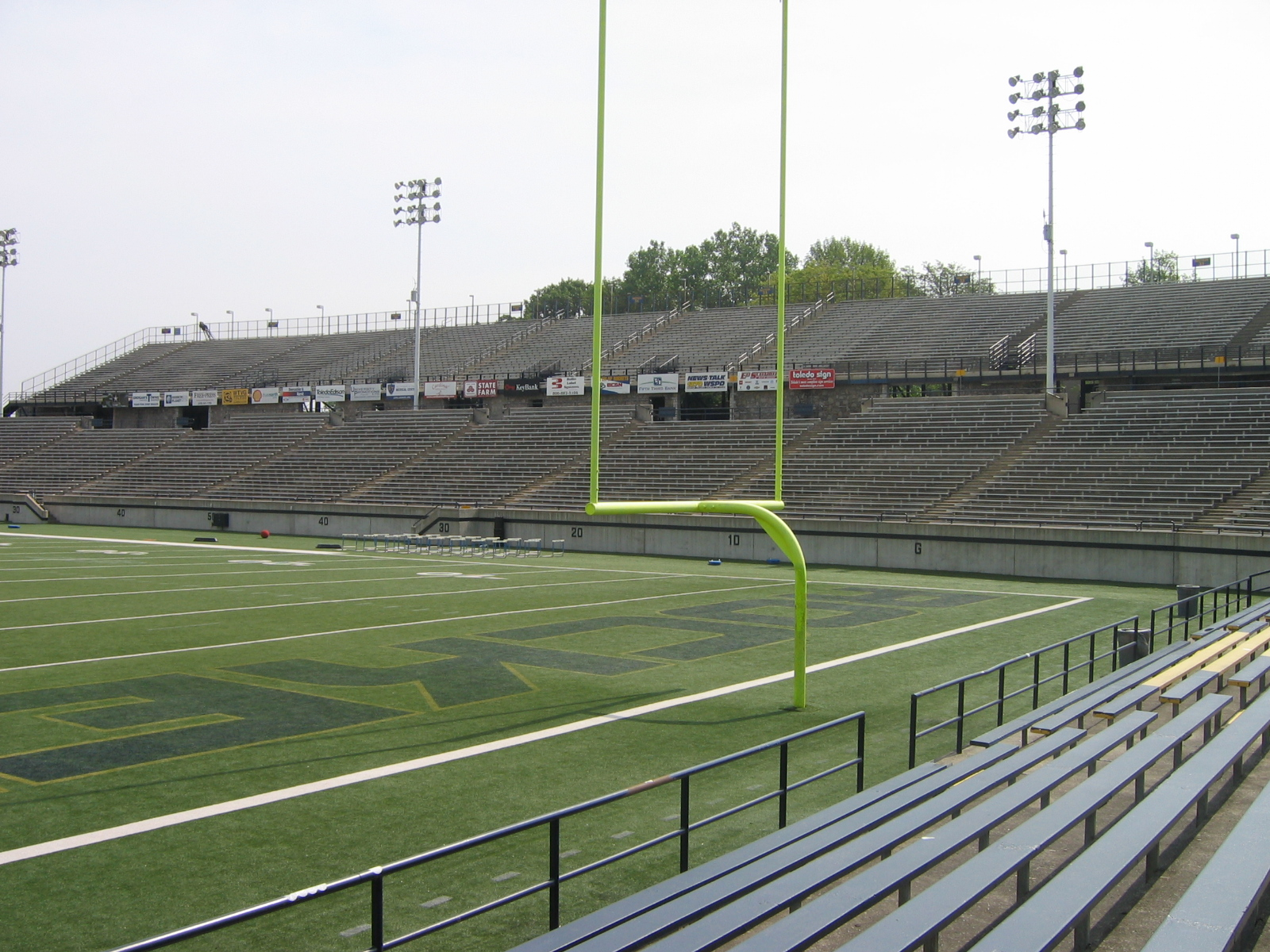
Glass Bowl, home to Toledo Rockets football team

Football at The University of Toledo started in 1917 with a 145–0 loss to The University of Detroit. They finished off that season 0–3, being out scored by their opponents 262–0. For twenty years, UT football teams were moved from one stadium to another including Armory Park, Waite Bowl, the Nebraska Avenue grounds, St. John's field, Swayne Field and Libbey Stadium.

Finally in 1937, The University of Toledo's football team resided in its permanent home on the university's Bancroft Campus. Construction of the field, which is set in a natural bowl, began in February 1936 as a project of the Works Progress Administration during the Great Depression. The only means of construction were picks, shovels, and wheelbarrows. The original design of the stadium had a seating capacity of 11,000 fans. It now has the capacity to hold 26,248 fans.

The first game in the Rockets' stadium was on September 25, 1937. Grass had not yet been planted around the stadium and there were no walkways to the entrance. Thus, when heavy rainfall deluged the area, mud blocked the gates and the game had to be postponed until the following Monday. The Rockets went on to beat Bluffton College, 26–0. The Rockets' stadium is known as the "Glass Bowl" in recognition of Toledo's distinction of being the glass capital of the world. The stadium was not named the "Glass Bowl" until renovations in 1946. The origin of the name dates back to 1946 and a man named Wayne Kohn, an employee of the structural engineering department of the Libbey-Owens Ford Glass Co., who suggested an annual Glass Bowl football game to be played in the Rockets' stadium. Three Toledo glass manufacturing companies developed the idea further and with the university sponsored a "Glass Bowl" stadium, which was a renovation of the then current stadium. The stone structures at the northeast and northwest corners of the Glass Bowl are called Blockhouses. In the past, the Blockhouses were used as a residence for the football players. The Rockets would stay in the west Blockhouse and the visitors would stay in the east Blockhouse.

The Glass Bowl is the second oldest stadium in the Mid-American Conference, behind Ohio University's Peden Stadium. Over the years there have been many renovations made to the Glass Bowl, such as switching from grass to Astroturf in October 1974; building an electronic scoreboard in 1975; adding seats in 1972; again adding seats, a press tower, luxury boxes, and Larimer Athletic Complex in 1990, and switching to NeXturf, an artificial surface carefully modeled after natural grass, in July 2001. The outer wall and Blockhouses are all that remain of the original Glass Bowl Stadium.

=== Savage Arena ===
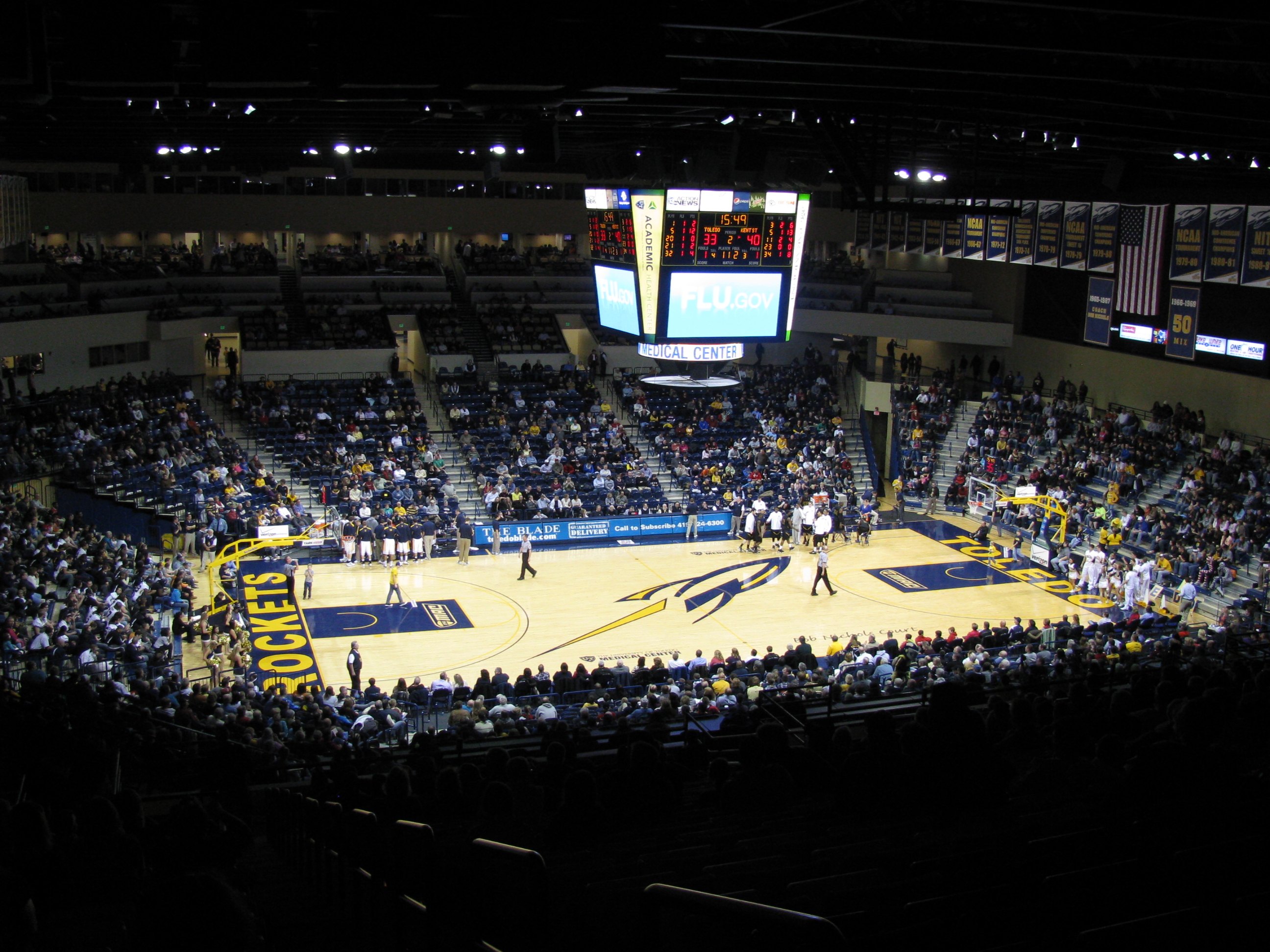
Savage Arena is home to the basketball teams

Formerly known as Savage Hall, John F. Savage Hall is much more than just UT's 9,000-seat basketball arena. Savage Hall is a multi-purpose building that is used for recreation, concerts and other special events, such as graduation. The arena built in 1976 was originally named Centennial Hall. The hall was renamed John F. Savage Hall on July 13, 1988, in honor of the 1952 UT graduate and strong university booster, John Savage, who was instrumental in the campaign to raise funds for the arena. Prior to the construction of Savage Hall, basketball games were played at the Field House, the second oldest building on campus.

The inaugural men's basketball game played in Centennial Hall was against the Indiana Hoosiers, who were the national champions the year before, ranked #1 nationally, and on a 33-game winning streak. The hall was packed with over 10,000 fans who came to see the Rockets end the Hoosiers winning streak by a very close score of 59–57. The hall has also hosted many musical acts over the years including Stevie Wonder, James Taylor, Metallica, Pearl Jam, Cher, Bush, Matchbox 20, Elton John, Goo Goo Dolls, Sheryl Crow, Boyz II Men, Destiny's Child, Dave Matthew's Band, Barenaked Ladies, and Elvis. Recently the hall was renovated and renamed John F. Savage Arena. On the inaugural game the Rockets beat the University of Massachusetts in a game-winning buzzer-beater to put Toledo in the lead with a final score of 57–56.

=== Scott Park Baseball Complex ===
Toledo's baseball facility has a capacity of 690 spectators. Its dimensions, from left field to right field are 330 feet, 400 feet, and 330 feet.

== Organizations ==
=== Rocket Marching Band ===
The University of Toledo Rocket Marching Band (RMB) is one of the largest, oldest, and most visible student groups on campus. With approximately 200 members (majoring in Anthropology to Zoology) including musicians, color guard, Dancing Rockettes, and feature twirlers, the marching band is a positive source of pride and school spirit for the campus, as well as the city of Toledo.

The RMB marches in a roll step style popular among various marching units (including Drum Corps. International). While the band operates at all home football games, it is separate from the Athletic Department and is under the College of Arts and Science's Music Department.

The RMB is serviced by The Beta Rho chapter of Kappa Kappa Psi – National Honorary (Service) Band Fraternity.

The Band is currently under the direction of Dr. Andrew Rhodes.

=== Rockettes ===
The University of Toledo Dancing Rockettes were the first recognized collegiate dance team in the nation. The team debuted on March 16, 1961, at halftime of the Kent State-Toledo basketball game. The Dancing Rockettes officially merged with The University of Toledo Rocket Marching Band on March 12, 1978.

== Songs ==
=== Fight song ===
Dave Connelly, UT athletic director and baseball coach through the 1930s and 1940s, wrote "U of Toledo" in 1932. Connelly also coached football, track, and boxing. He joined the UT faculty as a professor in 1926, where he remained until his death in 1955. Connelly loved to sing, but had never studied music. Apparently, previous fight songs were no longer in use, so he wrote the words for "U of Toledo" and sang the melody to a family friend, Bernie Jones. Jones played it on the piano and put it to music. The tune remained largely unchanged until 1975, when UT associate professor of music David Jex arranged a version removing the verse. Keeping the tune intact, the marching band's arrangement was updated in 2017 by graduate student Adam Miller.

=== Alma mater ===
"Fair Toledo" was selected from eight entries, which were submitted in the UT Alma Mater Song Contest, sponsored jointly by the Student Senate and the Alumni Association in 1959. The competition was held to replace "Golden and the Blue," set to "Annie Lisle," a tune used by various universities. While driving to work, Gilbert Mohr, an amateur songwriter, heard the contest announced on the radio. Mohr began humming different tunes, and later with his wife, Jean Strout, wrote the lyrics known today as "Fair Toledo". The alma mater debuted at halftime of the Marshall-Toledo basketball game on March 2, 1959. Recently it has become a tradition for students and alumni alike to stay after the game is over and sing the Alma Mater as the Rocket Marching Band plays it. While singing it is tradition to put ones arms around a nearby Rocket's shoulders and sway from side to side.

== Mascot ==
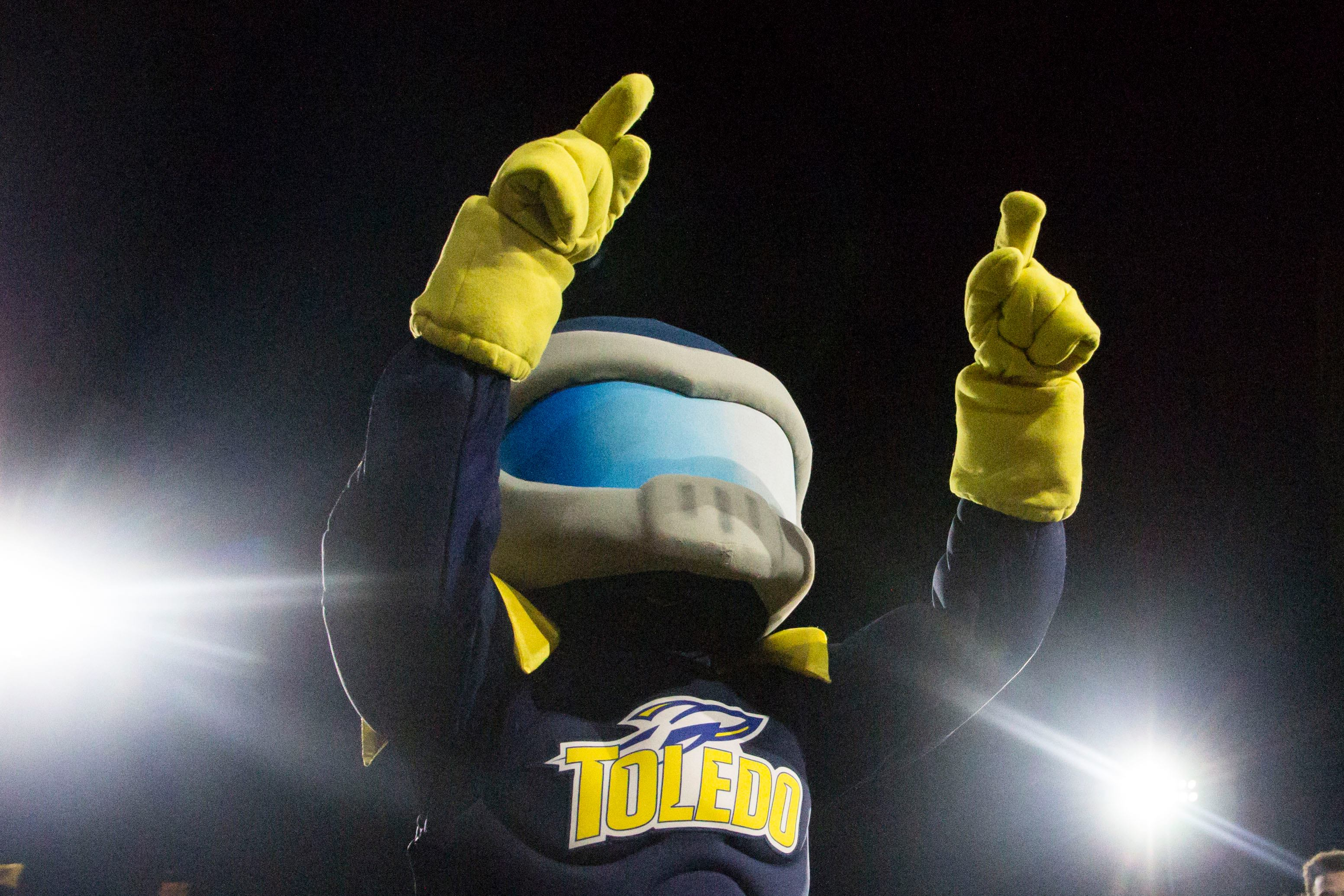
The current Rocky the Rocket at Scheumann Stadium

Rocky the Rocket, The University of Toledo's mascot, was created in the 1966–67 academic year by the Spirits and Traditions committee, an appendage of student government, with various students being chosen to dress up as the mascot for different games. In the fall of 1968, Rocky was taken under the wing of Dan Seemann, Director of Student Activities at the time, and the First Official Rocky the Rocket, Bill Navarre, emerged. Navarre assumed the role at both home and away football and basketball games, wearing the Rocky the Rocket costume, which was made by the theatre department seamstress: a wastepaper basket with a pointed rocket top made of papier-mâché. In the past, Rocky was run by the Student Activities office, but is now supported by the Athletics Department. Any student can try out in the spring semester to be Rocky for the following year.

The mascot can be viewed at various university sponsored events including pep rallies, home and away football games, men and women's basketball games and the homecoming parade.

=== Mascots history ===
- In the early 1970s, Rocky wore a tall metal rocket helmet with many different jumpsuit type outfits, including such items as bell-bottom pants.
- In 1977, an authentic spacesuit, helmet, and boots were donated to the university by the NASA Space Center in Houston, Texas with the help of former Ohio astronaut and Senator, John Glenn. The space suit was used for football games, but because of its mass, a lightweight replica was used for the basketball season. Both suits were used until 1980 when Rocky took on a more futuristic look.
- Another Rocky costume, which was plush with huge feet, was introduced in 1983, but was only used until 1986 when a big blue plush Rocky with smaller feet was unveiled. Throughout the late 80s and most of the 90s only minor changes were made to Rocky's costume.
- In 1998, at the Bowling Green football game, the old Rocky got into a limousine and the new Rocky stepped out and displayed the new blue and gold rocket man Rocky costume, complete with jetpack.
- In 2002, an inflatable Rocky the Rocket was unveiled as an addition to the Rocket man Rocky.
- In 2008, the Rocketman Rocky and the inflatable Rocky the Rocket were retired, and a new foam Rocketman Rocky arrived on the field of the Glass Bowl on a motorcycle.
- In 2011, at the home football opener pep rally, Rocksy, the female version of the 2008 Rocky, was introduced.
- In 2018, the university posted on Twitter that it would change Rocky to Shrek. This announcement was quickly rescinded, but not before gaining national media attention.

== Controversies ==
The Guardian reported in 2022 that Toledo women’s soccer coach Brad Evans was allowed to resign in 2015 from his position leading the women’s soccer program at the university, while the university was aware of an allegation of sexual assault by him which the university stopped investigating upon his resignation. The newspaper asserted that lack of transparency and failure by the university and by the US Center for SafeSport (which also received a report) to complete investigations into the sexual assault allegation allowed Evans to continue to coach girls and young women for years.

Former University of Toledo assistant coach Candice Fabry had reported an alleged sexual assault by Evans to SafeSport, but SafeSport reportedly did not investigate him at the time.
