= NCAA Division I Men's Outdoor Track and Field Championships =

- Current season, competition or edition: 2026 NCAA Division I Outdoor Track and Field Championships
- Association: NCAA
- Sport: College outdoor track and field
- Founded: 1921; 105 years ago
- Division: Division I
- Country: United States
- Most recent champion: Arkansas
- Most titles: USC (27)
- Broadcaster: ESPNU
- Website: NCAA.com

The NCAA Division I Men's Outdoor Track and Field Championship is an annual collegiate outdoor track and field competition for men organised by the National Collegiate Athletic Association (NCAA). It has been held every year since 1921, except for 1924 and 2020. The first edition of the championship was held in 1921 and the competition expanded to two divisions in 1963 and three divisions in 1974.

Athlete's individual performances earn points for their institution and the team with the most points receives the NCAA team title in track and field. A separate NCAA Division I women's competition is also held. These two events are separate from the NCAA Division I Men's Indoor Track and Field Championships and NCAA Division I Women's Indoor Track and Field Championships held during the winter.

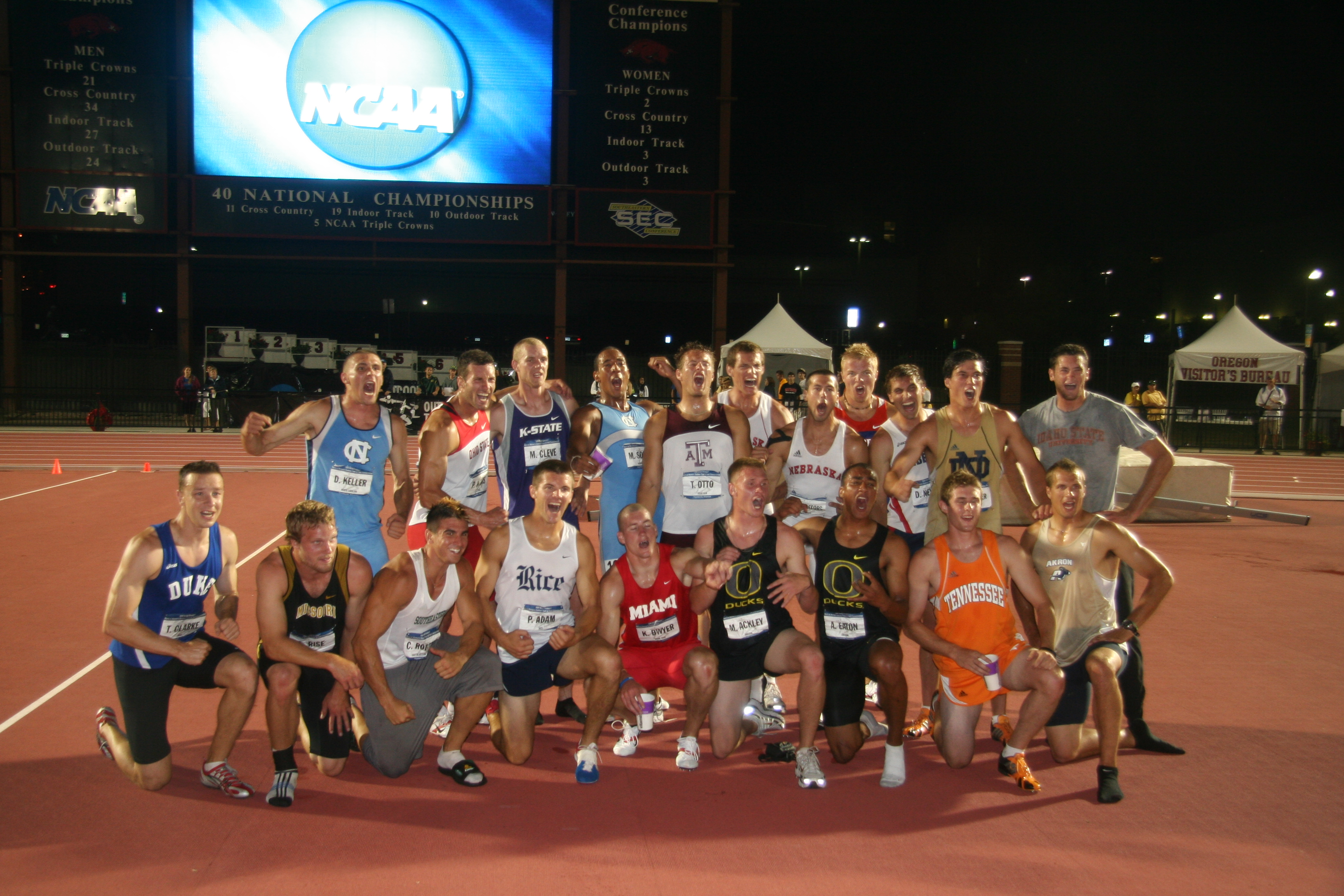
Decathlete competitors pose at the 2009 NCAA Track & Field Championships in Fayetteville, Arkansas, United States.

Teams and their athletes must abide by NCAA rules in order to compete – the Arkansas Razorbacks were stripped of their 2004 and 2005 titles for recruitment violations, while Florida State University lost its 2007 NCAA Division I title because one of its athletes had not met the academic requirements.

== Events ==
=== Track events ===
- Sprint events
  - 100 meter dash (1921–present)
  - 200 meter dash (1921–present)
  - 400 meter dash (1921–present)
- Distance events
  - 800 meter run (1921–present)
  - 1,500 meter run (1921–present)
  - 3,000 meter steeplechase (1948–present)
  - 5,000 meter run (1959–present)
  - 10,000 meter run (1948–present)
- Hurdle Events
  - 110 meter hurdles (1921–present)
  - 400 meter intermediate hurdles (1921–present)
- Relay events
  - 400 meter relay (1964–present)
  - 1,600 meter relay (1964–present)

=== Field events ===
- Jumping events
  - High jump (1921–present)
  - Pole vault (1921–present)
  - Long jump (1921–present)
  - Triple jump (1932–present)
- Throwing events
  - Shot put (1921–present)
  - Discus throw (1921–present)
  - Hammer throw (1921–present)
  - Javelin throw (1921–present)
- Multi-events
  - Decathlon (1970–present)

=== Discontinued events ===
- Discontinued events
  - Two-mile run (1921–1958)
  - 220 yard low hurdles (1921–1959)

== Team Champions ==
NCAA Division I Men's Outdoor Track and Field Championships
Year	Site	Venue	Team Championship			
Year	Site	Venue	Winner	Points	Runner-up	Points
1921; Details	Chicago	Stagg Field	Illinois	20 1/4	Notre Dame	16 3/4
1922; Details	Chicago	Stagg Field	California	28 1/2	Penn State	19 1/2
1923; Details	Chicago	Stagg Field	Michigan	29 1/2	Mississippi State	16
1924	Not held					
1925; Details	Chicago	Soldier Field	Stanford^{1}	31	—	—
1926; Details	Chicago	Soldier Field	USC^{1}	27	—	—
1927; Details	Chicago	Soldier Field	Illinois^{1}	35	—	—
1928; Details	Chicago	Soldier Field	Stanford	72	Ohio State	31
1929; Details	Chicago	Stagg Field	Ohio State	50	Washington	42
1930; Details	Chicago	Stagg Field	USC	55 7/20	Washington	40
1931; Details	Chicago	Stagg Field	USC	77 1/7	Ohio State	31 1/7
1932; Details	Chicago	Stagg Field	Indiana	56	Ohio State	49 3/4
1933; Details	Chicago	Stagg Field	LSU	58	USC	54
1934; Details	Los Angeles	Los Angeles Memorial Coliseum	Stanford	63	USC	57 7/20
1935; Details	Berkeley, California	Edwards Stadium	USC	74 1/5	Ohio State	40 1/5
1936; Details	Chicago	Stagg Field	USC	103 1/3	Ohio State	73
1937; Details	Berkeley, California	Edwards Stadium	USC	62	Stanford	50
1938; Details	Minneapolis	Memorial Stadium	USC	67 3/4	Stanford	38
1939; Details	Los Angeles	Los Angeles Memorial Coliseum	USC	86	Stanford	44 3/4
1940; Details	Minneapolis	Memorial Stadium	USC	47	Stanford	28 2/3
1941; Details	Palo Alto, California	Stanford Stadium	USC	81 1/2	Indiana	50
1942; Details	Lincoln, Nebraska	Memorial Stadium	USC	85 1/2	Ohio State	44 1/5
1943; Details	Evanston, Illinois	Dyche Stadium	USC	46	California	39
1944; Details	Milwaukee	Marquette Stadium	Illinois	79	Notre Dame	43
1945; Details	Milwaukee	Marquette Stadium	Navy	62	Michigan	52 3/5
1946; Details	Minneapolis	Memorial Stadium	Illinois	78	USC	42 17/20
1947; Details	Salt Lake City	Ute Stadium	Illinois	59 2/3	USC	34 1/4
1948; Details	Minneapolis	Memorial Stadium	Minnesota	46	USC	41 1/2
1949; Details	Los Angeles	Los Angeles Memorial Coliseum	USC	55 2/5	UCLA	31
1950; Details	Minneapolis	Memorial Stadium	USC	49 1/5	Stanford	28
1951; Details	Seattle, WA	Husky Stadium	USC	56	Cornell	40
1952; Details	Berkeley, California	Edwards Stadium	USC	66 7/12	San José State	24 1/3
1953; Details	Lincoln, Nebraska	Memorial Stadium	USC	80	Illinois	41
1954; Details	Ann Arbor, Michigan	Ferry Field	USC	66 17/20	Illinois	31 17/20
1955; Details	Los Angeles	Los Angeles Memorial Coliseum	USC	42	UCLA	34
1956; Details	Berkeley, California	Edwards Stadium	UCLA	55 7/10	Kansas	51
1957; Details	Austin, Texas	Memorial Stadium	Villanova	47	California	32
1958; Details	Berkeley, California	Edwards Stadium	USC	48 6/7	Kansas	40 3/4
1959; Details	Lincoln, Nebraska	Memorial Stadium	Kansas	73	San José State	48 7/10
1960; Details	Berkeley, California	Edwards Stadium	Kansas	50	USC	37
1961; Details	Philadelphia	Franklin Field	USC	65	Oregon	47
1962; Details	Eugene, Oregon	Hayward Field	Oregon	85	Villanova	40
1963; Details	Albuquerque, New Mexico	University Stadium	USC	61	Stanford	42
1964; Details	Eugene, Oregon	Hayward Field	Oregon	70	San Jose State	40
1965; Details	Berkeley, California	Edwards Stadium	Oregon; USC	32	—	—
1966; Details	Bloomington, Indiana	Billy Hayes Track	UCLA	81	BYU	33
1967; Details	Provo, Utah	Cougar Stadium	USC	86	Oregon	40
1968; Details	Berkeley, California	Edwards Stadium	USC	58	Washington State	57
1969; Details	Knoxville, Tennessee	Tom Black Track	San Jose State	48	Kansas	45
1970; Details	Des Moines, Iowa	Drake Stadium	BYU; Kansas; Oregon	35	—	—
1971; Details	Seattle, WA	Husky Stadium	UCLA	52	USC	41
1972; Details	Eugene, Oregon	Hayward Field	UCLA	82	USC	49
1973; Details	Baton Rouge, Louisiana	Bernie Moore Track Stadium	UCLA	52	Oregon	31
1974; Details	Austin, Texas	Memorial Stadium	Tennessee	60	UCLA	56
1975; Details	Provo, Utah	Cougar Stadium	UTEP	55	UCLA	42
1976; Details	Philadelphia	Franklin Field	USC	64	UTEP	44
1977; Details	Champaign, Illinois	Memorial Stadium	Arizona State	64	UTEP	50
1978; Details	Eugene, Oregon	Hayward Field	UCLA; UTEP	35	—	—
1979; Details	Champaign, Illinois	Memorial Stadium	UTEP	64	Villanova	48
1980; Details	Austin, Texas	Memorial Stadium	UTEP	69	UCLA	46
1981; Details	Baton Rouge, Louisiana	Bernie Moore Track Stadium	UTEP	70	SMU	57
1982; Details	Provo, Utah	Clarence F. Robison Track	UTEP	105	Tennessee	94
1983; Details	Houston	Robertson Stadium	SMU	104	Tennessee	102
1984; Details	Eugene, Oregon	Hayward Field	Oregon	113	Washington State	94 1/2
1985; Details	Austin, Texas	Memorial Stadium	Arkansas	61	Washington State	46
1986; Details	Indianapolis	Carroll Stadium	SMU	53	Washington State	52
1987; Details	Baton Rouge, Louisiana	Bernie Moore Track Stadium	UCLA	81	Texas	28
1988; Details	Eugene, Oregon	Hayward Field	UCLA	82	Texas	41
1989; Details	Provo, Utah	Clarence F. Robison Track	LSU	53	Texas A&M	51
1990; Details	Durham, North Carolina	Wallace Wade Stadium	LSU	44	Arkansas	36
1991; Details	Eugene, Oregon	Hayward Field	Tennessee	51	Washington State	42
1992; Details	Austin, Texas	Memorial Stadium	Arkansas	60	Tennessee	46 1/2
1993; Details	New Orleans	Tad Gormley Stadium	Arkansas	69	LSU; Ohio State	45
1994; Details	Boise, Idaho	Bronco Stadium	Arkansas	83	UTEP	45
1995; Details	Knoxville, Tennessee	Tom Black Track	Arkansas	61 1/2	UCLA	55
1996; Details	Eugene, Oregon	Hayward Field	Arkansas	55	George Mason	40
1997; Details	Bloomington, Indiana	Billy Hayes Track	Arkansas	55	Texas	42 1/2
1998; Details	Buffalo, New York	University at Buffalo Stadium	Arkansas	82	Stanford	41
1999; Details	Boise, Idaho	Bronco Stadium	Arkansas	59	Stanford	52
2000; Details	Durham, North Carolina	Wallace Wade Stadium	Stanford	72	Arkansas	59
2001; Details	Eugene, Oregon	Hayward Field	Tennessee	50	TCU	49
2002; Details	Baton Rouge, Louisiana	Bernie Moore Track Stadium	LSU	64	Tennessee	57
2003; Details	Sacramento, California	Hornet Stadium	Arkansas	59	Auburn	50
2004; Details	Austin, Texas	Mike A. Myers Stadium	Arkansas^{2}	—	Florida	49
2005; Details	Sacramento, California	Hornet Stadium	Arkansas^{2}	—	Florida	49
2006; Details	Sacramento, California	Hornet Stadium	Florida State	67	LSU	51
2007; Details	Sacramento, California	Hornet Stadium	Florida State^{3}	54	LSU	48
2008; Details	Des Moines, Iowa	Drake Stadium	Florida State	52	LSU; Auburn	44
2009; Details	Fayetteville, Arkansas	John McDonnell Field	Texas A&M	48	Florida; Florida State; Oregon	46
2010; Details	Eugene, Oregon	Hayward Field	Texas A&M	55	Florida	54
2011; Details	Des Moines, Iowa	Drake Stadium	Texas A&M	55	Florida State	54
2012; Details	Des Moines, Iowa	Drake Stadium	Florida	50	LSU	48
2013; Details	Eugene, Oregon	Hayward Field	Florida; Texas A&M	53	—	—
2014; Details	Eugene, Oregon	Hayward Field	Oregon	88	Florida	70
2015; Details	Eugene, Oregon	Hayward Field	Oregon	85	Florida	56
2016; Details	Eugene, Oregon	Hayward Field	Florida	62	Arkansas	56
2017; Details	Eugene, Oregon	Hayward Field	Florida	61.5	Texas A&M	59.5
2018; Details	Eugene, Oregon	Hayward Field	Georgia	52	Florida	42
2019; Details	Austin, Texas	Mike A. Myers Stadium	Texas Tech	60	Florida	50
2020; Details	Austin, Texas	Mike A. Myers Stadium	Not held due to the coronavirus pandemic			
2021; Details	Eugene, Oregon	Hayward Field	LSU	84	Oregon	53
2022; Details	Eugene, Oregon	Hayward Field	Florida	54	Texas	38
2023; Details	Austin, Texas	Mike A. Myers Stadium	Florida	57	Arkansas	53
2024; Details	Eugene, Oregon	Hayward Field	Florida	41	Auburn	40
2025; Details	Eugene, Oregon	Hayward Field	USC; Texas A&M	41	—	—
2026; Details	Eugene, Oregon	Hayward Field	Arkansas	56	Georgia	49

1. The 1925, 1926, and 1927 championships were all awarded unofficially.
2. Arkansas was forced to vacate the NCAA titles in 2004 and 2005 because of recruiting violations. The titles have not been awarded to any other school.
3. Florida State was forced to vacate the 2007 NCAA title due to academic violations by one of its athletes.

== Appearances ==
This list consists of the top twenty-five men's college outdoor track and field teams in terms of appearances in the NCAA Men's Division I Outdoor Track and Field Championship.

Top 25 rankings as of 14 June 2025
Rank	Logo	Team	Appearances
1		USC	91
2		Oregon	87
3		California	81
3		Texas	81
5		UCLA	79
5		Kansas	79
7		Stanford	77
8		Illinois	76
8		Michigan	76
8		Washington State	76
11		Wisconsin	75
12		Nebraska	71
13		BYU	70
13		Minnesota	70
15		Washington	68
16		Oklahoma	66
17		Kansas State	65
17		Rice	65
17		Texas A&M	65
20		Arizona	64
20		Arizona State	64
22		Indiana	63
22		Ohio State	63
22		LSU	63
25		Missouri	62
25		Tennessee	62

== Titles ==
=== Team titles ===
Team	Titles	Year Won
USC	27	1926, 1930, 1931, 1935, 1936, 1937, 1938, 1939, 1940, 1941, 1942, 1943, 1949, 1950, 1951, 1952, 1953, 1954, 1955, 1958, 1961, 1963, 1965, 1967, 1968, 1976, 2025
Arkansas	11	1985, 1992, 1993, 1994, 1995, 1996, 1997, 1998, 1999, 2003, 2026
UCLA	8	1956, 1966, 1971, 1972, 1973, 1978, 1987, 1988
Florida	7	2012, 2013, 2016, 2017, 2022, 2023, 2024
Oregon	7	1962, 1964, 1965, 1970, 1984, 2014, 2015
UTEP	6	1975, 1978, 1979, 1980, 1981, 1982
Illinois	5	1921, 1927, 1944, 1946, 1947
LSU	5	1933, 1989, 1990, 2002, 2021
Texas A&M	5	2009, 2010, 2011, 2013, 2025
Stanford	4	1925, 1928, 1934, 2000
Kansas	3	1959, 1960, 1970
Tennessee	3	1974, 1991, 2001
Florida State	2	2006, 2008
SMU	2	1983, 1986
Texas Tech	1	2019
Arizona State	1	1977
BYU	1	1970
California	1	1922
Georgia	1	2018
Indiana	1	1932
Michigan	1	1923
Minnesota	1	1948
Navy	1	1945
Ohio State	1	1929
San Jose State	1	1969
Villanova	1	1957

=== Individual titles ===
- List updated through the 2024 Championships; top 15 teams only.

Titles	Institution
123	USC
75	Oregon
62	LSU, UCLA
58	Arkansas
50	Stanford
49	Florida
48	UTEP
47	Texas
44	Ohio State
42	Illinois
38	Washington State
36	Tennessee, Texas A&M
35	Michigan

== Championships records ==
=== Event records ===
Event	Record	Athlete	Team	Date	Meet	Place	Ref.
Track events
100 m	9.82 (+1.3 m/s)	Christian Coleman	Tennessee	7 June 2017	2017 Championships	Eugene, Oregon	
200 m	19.63 (+1.5 m/s)	(Cayman Islands) Jaiden Reid	Louisiana State University	12 June 2026	2026 Championships	Eugene, Oregon	
400 m	43.38	(Nigeria) Samuel Ogazi	University of Alabama	12 June 2026	2026 Championships	Eugene, Oregon	
800 m	1:43.55	Donavan Brazier	Texas A&M	10 June 2016	2016 Championships	Eugene, Oregon	
1500 m	3:35.30	(South Africa) Sydney Maree	Villanova	6 June 1981	1981 Championships	Baton Rouge, Louisiana	
5000 m	13:12.27	Cooper Teare	Oregon	11 June 2021	2021 Championships	Eugene, Oregon	
10,000 m	27:41.87	(United Kingdom) Patrick Dever	Tulsa	9 June 2021	2021 Championships	Eugene, Oregon	
110 m hurdles	12.75 (+1.0 m/s) WR	Ja'Kobe Tharp	Auburn	10 June 2026	2026 Championships	Eugene, Oregon	
400 m hurdles	47.02	Rai Benjamin	USC	8 June 2018	2018 Championships	Eugene, Oregon	
3000 m steeplechase	8:12.39	(Kenya) Henry Rono	Washington State	1 June 1978	1978 Championships	Eugene, Oregon	
4 × 100 m relay	37.75	(Malaysia) Azeem Fahmi (Nigeria) Kayinsola Ajayi (Mexico) Austin Kresley; Tyler Davis	Auburn University	10 June 2026	2026 Championships	Eugene, Oregon	
4 × 400 m relay	2:57.74	(Nigeria) Emmanuel Bamidele; Jacory Patterson (Jamaica) Jevaughn Powell; Ryan Willie	Florida	9 June 2023	2023 Championships	Austin, Texas	
Field events
High jump	2.38 m (7-9 3/4)	Hollis Conway	University of Southwestern Louisiana	3 June 1989	1989 Championships	Provo, Utah	
Pole vault	5.95 m (19-6)	Chris Nilsen	South Dakota	5 June 2019	2019 Championships	Austin, Texas	
Long jump	8.53 m (28-0)	Erick Walder	Arkansas	3 June 1993	1993 Championships	New Orleans, Louisiana	
Triple jump	17.57 m (57-7 3/4)	(United Kingdom) Keith Connor	SMU	5 June 1982	1982 Championships	Provo, Utah	
Shot put	22.00 m (72-2 1/4)	John Godina	UCLA	3 June 1995	1995 Championships	Knoxville, Tennessee	
Discus throw	69.31 m (227-4)	Ralford Mullings	Oklahoma	13 June 2025	2025 Championships	Eugene, Oregon	
Hammer throw	80.86 m (265-3)	(Hungary) Balázs Kiss	USC	31 May 1996	1996 Championships	Eugene, Oregon	
Javelin throw	86.62 m (284 ft 2 in)	(Grenada) Anderson Peters	Mississippi State	7 June 2019	2019 Championships	Austin, Texas	
Decathlon	8961 pts	(Germany) Leo Neugebauer	Texas	5–6 June 2024	2024 Championships	Eugene, Oregon	
Decathlon	100m (wind) / Long jump (wind) / Shot put / High jump / 400m / 110m H (wind) / Discus / Pole vault / Javelin / 1500m; 10.64 (+0.1 m/s) / 7.86 m (+0.9 m/s) / 17.46 m / 2.07 m / 48.03 / 14.36 (±0.0 m/s) / 57.70 m / 5.21 m / 56.64 m / 4:44.61						
Defunct track events
100 yard dash	9.1	Charlie Greene	Nebraska	15 June 1967	1967 Championships	Provo, Utah	
200 meter dash – Straightaway	20.3	Ralph Metcalfe	Marquette	June 1933	1933 Championships	Chicago, Illinois	
220 yard dash – Straightaway	20.4	Ralph Metcalfe; Mel Patton	Marquette; USC	June 1933; June 1949	1933 Championships; 1949 Championships	Chicago, Illinois; Los Angeles, California	
220 yard dash – One turn	20.2	Tommie Smith; John Carlos	San Jose State; San Jose State	15 June 1967; 21 June 1967	1967 Championships	Provo, Utah	
440 yard dash – Two turns	44.7	Curtis Mills	Texas A&M	21 June 1969	1969 Championships	Knoxville, Tennessee	
880 yard run	1:45.9	(Jamaica) Byron Dyce	New York	21 June 1969	1969 Championships	Knoxville, Tennessee	
Mile	3:57.1	Dave Wottle	Bowling Green	9 June 1973	1973 Championships	Baton Rouge, Louisiana	
Two-mile run	8:46.3	Alex Henderson	Arizona State	June 1958	1958 Championships	Berkeley, California	
Three-mile run	13:05.3	Steve Prefontaine	Oregon	9 June 1973	1973 Championships	Baton Rouge, Louisiana	
Six-mile run	27:43.1	Garry Bjorklund	Minnesota	18 June 1971	1971 Championships	Seattle, Washington	
120 yard hurdles	13.1	Rod Milburn	Southern	8 June 1973	1973 Championships	Baton Rouge, Louisiana	
220 yard hurdles – Straightaway	22.2	Ancel Robinson	Fresno State	June 1957	1957 Championships	Austin, Texas	
220 yard hurdles – One turn	22.7	Charlie Tidwell	Kansas	June 1968	1968 Championships	Berkeley, California	
440 yard hurdles	48.8	Ralph Mann	BYU	20 June 1970	1970 Championships	Des Moines, Iowa	
440 yard relay	38.6	Earl McCullouch; Fred Kuller; O. J. Simpson (Jamaica) Lennox Miller	USC	17 June 1967	1967 Championships	Provo, Utah	
Mile relay	3:03.06	Aubrey Jones; Fonnie Kemp; Dannie Carter; Don Bly	Oklahoma	2 June 1984	1984 Championships	Eugene, Oregon	
Defunct field events
Javelin throw (old javelin)	89.98 m (295-2)	(Iceland) Einar Vilhjalmsson	Texas	2 June 1983	1983 Championships	Houston, Texas	
Decathlon (old javelin)	8279 pts	(Argentina) Tito Steiner	BYU	2–3 June 1981	1981 Championships	Baton Rouge, Louisiana	

=== Career records ===
- Individual champions from one team, year: 7
  - Ohio State (1936)
- Individual titles, year: 4
  - Jesse Owens, Ohio State (1935, 1936)
- Individual titles, career: 8
  - Jesse Owens, Ohio State (1935–36)
- Individual titles, event: 4
  - Steve Prefontaine, Oregon (Three-mile run, 1970–73)
  - Scott Neilson, Washington (Hammer throw, 1976–79)
  - Suleiman Nyambui, UTEP (10,000 meter run, 1979–82)
  - Balázs Kiss, USC (Hammer throw, 1993–96)

== See also ==
- NCAA Men's Outdoor Track and Field Championship (Division II, Division III)
- NCAA Women's Outdoor Track and Field Championship (Division I, Division II, Division III)
- NCAA Men's Indoor Track and Field Championship (Division I, Division II, Division III)
- NCAA Women's Indoor Track and Field Championships (Division I, Division II, Division III)
- Pre-NCAA Outdoor Track and Field Champions
