= Mike A. Myers Stadium =

Soccer and track stadium in Austin, Texas, United States

Myers Stadium

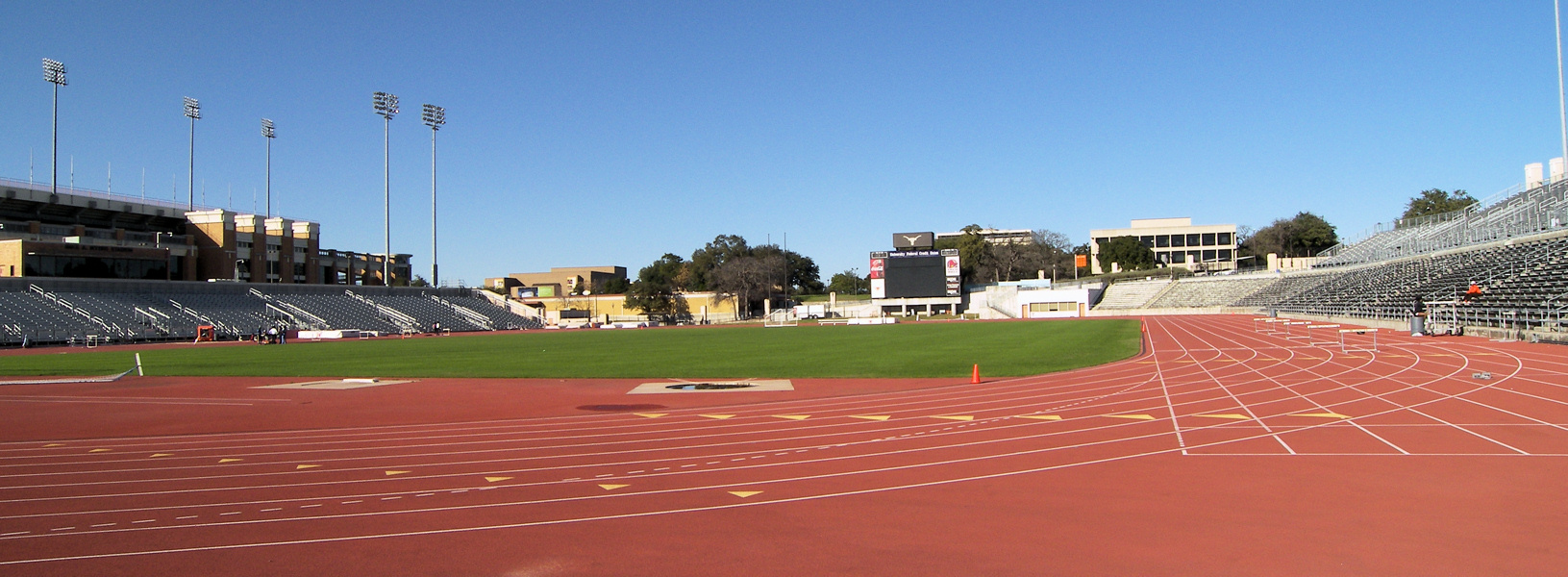
- Interior of Myers Stadium in 2007
- Interactive map of Myers Stadium
- Full name: Mike A. Myers Stadium and Soccer Field
- Location: Austin, Texas, United States
- Coordinates: 30°16′57″N 97°43′47″W
- Owner: University of Texas, Austin
- Operator: Univ. of Texas Athletics
- Capacity: 20,000
- Type: Stadium
- Surface: Natural grass
- Current use: Soccer; Track and field

Construction
- Groundbreaking: 1997
- Built: 1997–1999
- Opened: March 20, 1999; 27 years ago
- Cost: $13 MM

Tenants
- Texas Longhorns (NCAA) teams: women's soccer (1999–present); track and field (1999–present)

Website
- texaslonghorns.com/stadium

Mike A. Myers Stadium and Soccer Field is a stadium in Austin, Texas, United States. Located on the University of Texas at Austin, it is home of the Texas Longhorn track and field and soccer teams, and also the USATF Elite Running Circuit Austin Track Club. The 20,000-seat stadium hosts the historic Texas Relays annually in April, as well as the University Interscholastic League track and field state championship in May.

== Opening ==
In 1996, plans were made to construct the stadium in response to the need to expand Darrell K Royal–Texas Memorial Stadium and convert it to a football-specific facility, the desire to move track and field events to a venue that was more fan and athlete friendly, and the need to construct an appropriate on-campus facility to house the varsity soccer program begun in 1994. Construction began in 1997, and the stadium was opened in March 1999, just in time to host the Texas Relays. The stadium is named for Mike Myers, a residential community developer who lives in Dallas, who is also a graduate of UT's law and business schools, in recognition of his $3 million donation to finance construction. The opening of the stadium now meant that track and field events could take place in the same venue; previously, field events had been conducted at nearby Clark Field out of concern for the condition of the football stadium's turf.

== Events hosted ==
The stadium hosted the 2002 NCAA Women's Soccer Championship, the 2004, 2019 and 2023 NCAA Men's and Women's Outdoor Track and Field Championships, and the 2003 Big 12 Conference Outdoor Championship.

== Layout ==
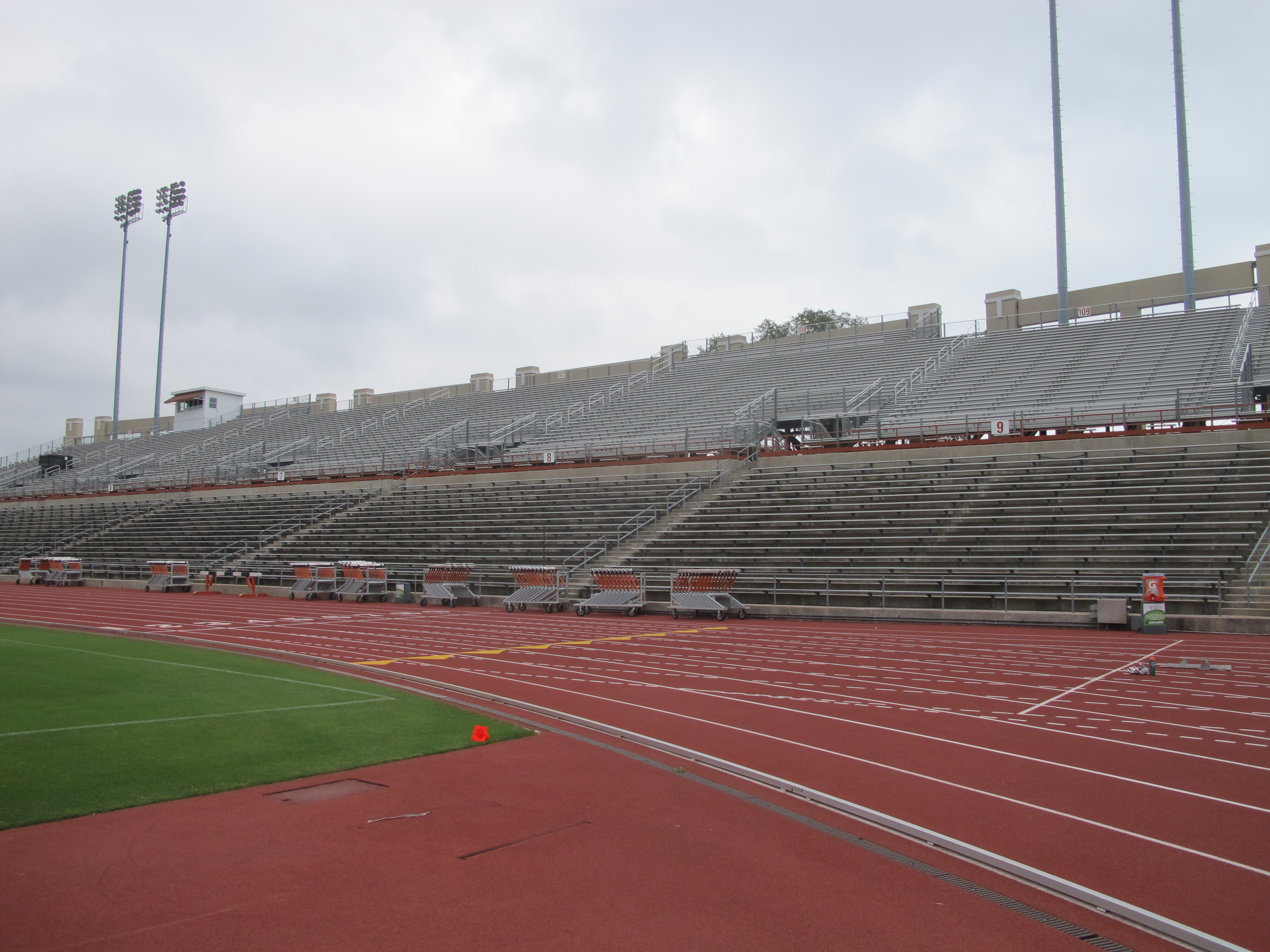
Stadium grandstands and track as seen in 2016

The stadium track is a nine lane European oval, with straightaways of 82 meters and curves of 118 meters in length, which creates a longer, smoother curve than the typical 100 m-by-100 m configuration. This smoother curve has given the track a reputation as one of the fastest tracks in the United States, if not the world. The field events area consists of several throwing circles, dual jump lanes, and two high jump aprons.

The facility also houses a 21,200-square-foot (1,970 m^{2}) field house consisting of a press box, locker rooms for the UT track and soccer teams, visitors' and officials locker rooms, a specialized training room, and a lounge for track and soccer athletes and coaches. There is a scoreboard at each end of the stadium, and full lighting allows events to be conducted at night. On the west side of the stadium stands a 1,200-space parking garage.

== College GameDay ==
ESPN's College Gameday was on hand at Myers Stadium on October 22, 2005 to preview and discuss the football game versus the Texas Tech Red Raiders and again on September 9, 2006 against the Ohio State Buckeyes. The Gameday set was situated to take advantage of the dramatic views of downtown Austin and the UT Tower from the stadium.

== Attendance records ==
Texas Women's Soccer
| # | Date | Opponent | Attendance | Result |
|---|---|---|---|---|
| 1 | September 26, 2008 | Texas A&M | 5,585 | T 0–0 |
| 2 | August 25, 2000 | North Carolina | 5,440 | L 2–9 |
| 3 | November 2, 2001 | Texas A&M | 5,376 | L 0–6 |
| 4 | August 28, 2011 | Texas A&M | 4,222 | L 0–3 |
| 5 | October 27, 2006 | Texas A&M | 4,133 | W 1–0 |
| 6 | September 23, 2011 | Baylor | 3,867 | L 0–1 |
| 7 | September 20, 2002 | Vanderbilt | 3,406 | W 1–0 |
| 8 | August 31, 2001 | North Carolina | 3,233 | L 0–1 |
| 9 | September 27, 2013 | TCU | 2,841 | W 2–0 |
| 10 | September 24, 1999 | Texas A&M | 2,597 | L 0–5 |
Through end of 2019

| Preceded by Gerald J. Ford Stadium | Host of the Women's College Cup; 2002 | Succeeded by SAS Soccer Park |
