= Reggie Jones (sprinter) =

American track and field athlete (born 1953)

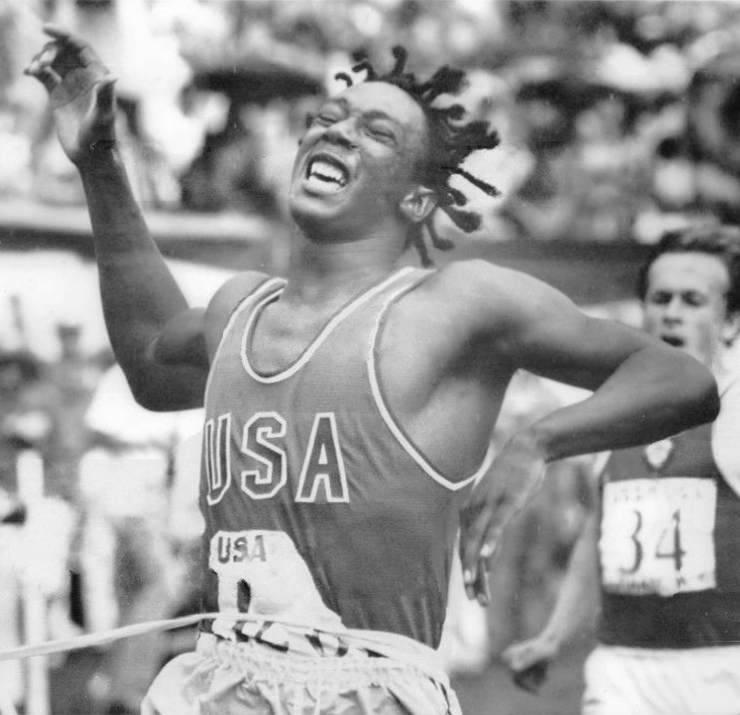
- Jones in 1974

Personal information
- National team: United States
- Born: Reginald Jones; December 30, 1953 (age 72) Saginaw, Michigan, U.S.

Sport
- Country: United States
- Sport: Track and field
- Event: Sprint

Achievements and titles
- Personal bests: 100 m – 10.2 (1974); 200 m – 20.5 (1975)
- Updated on February 28, 2016

Reginald Jones (born December 30, 1953) is an American track and field athlete. He is best known for recording a time in 1975 that equalled the then world record in the 100 meter dash and being a member of teams that in 1976 equalled the world records for the 4 × 220 y and 4 × 200 m relays.

== Track career ==
Jones ran for the University of Tennessee track team. During his time there he was NCAA champion in the 100 yards event in 1974 and the 220 yards event in 1975, helping the team to an NCAA championship. In addition, in 1974 he was voted the most valuable performer.

Later in 1974, Jones ran for the US in the USA vs USSR track meet and won the 200m m beating the then Olympic Champion Valeriy Borzov who was running for the Soviet Union and beat his more famous compatriot, Steve Williams to victory in the 100 m. On July 26, 1975, running in Boston, Jones won the 100 m event recording a time of 9.9 that equalled the then world record. The time was never forwarded for ratification because all the timings at the meeting were considered suspect.

Early in 1976, Jones ran the anchor legs of University of Tennessee team that equalled the world records for the 4 × 220 y and 4 × 200 m events. The former occurred on April 10 in Knoxville were the team ran 1.21.7 for 4 × 220 y; the latter occurred on April 24 in Philadelphia where the team ran 1.21.5 for the 4 × 200 m at the Penn Relays.

In 1976, Jones attempted to qualify for the Olympic Games but the reoccurrence of an old football injury meant he could only finish 7th in 100 m final and never got out of his semi in the 200 m. This injury was to prematurely end his track career.

== Accolades and awards ==
Jones has been inducted into the Saginaw County Sports Hall of Fame.

In 1998, Jones was inducted into the Penn Relay Hall of Fame for his exploits in 1976, and in 2006 the 1976 University of Tennessee world-record breaking team he was a member of was also inducted.

== Personal life ==
A native of Saginaw, Michigan Jones is reported to have worked as a teacher in Memphis, Tennessee after college.

== Track and field rankings ==
Jones was ranked among the best in the US and the world in the 100 yard/100 metre and 200 yard/200 metre sprint events in the period 1974–76, according to the votes of the experts of Track and Field News.

100 meters
| Year | World rank | US rank |
|---|---|---|
| 1974 | 4th | 2nd |
| 1975 | – | 5th |
| 1976 | 10th | 4th |

200 meters
| Year | World rank | US rank |
|---|---|---|
| 1974 | 5th | 1st |
| 1975 | 6th | 3rd |
| 1976 | – | – |
