= Lawrence Johnson (pole vaulter) =

American pole vaulter (born 1974)

Personal information
- Born: May 7, 1974 (age 52) Norfolk, Virginia, U.S.
Medal record
Men's athletics (track and field)
Representing the United States
Olympic Games
Silver medal – second place	2000 Sydney	Pole vault
World Indoor Championships
Gold medal – first place	2001 Lisbon	Pole vault
Silver medal – second place	1997 Paris	Pole vault
Summer Universiade
Silver medal – second place	1995 Fukuoka	Pole vault

Lawrence Johnson (born May 7, 1974) is an American pole vaulter. He earned the nickname "LoJo" at the University of Tennessee where he won four NCAA titles in the pole vault. Johnson began pole vaulting in 1989 and since has/holds records on all stages and led the charge to return the US to the international medal podium with two Olympic appearances, including a silver medal performance in 2000 Olympic games Sydney.

Johnson resigned as Assistant Coach/Pole Vault at the University of South Carolina in August 2011 to start an online business.

Johnson is best known for winning the Olympic silver medal in 2000, he also won a gold medal at the 2001 IAAF World Indoor Championships and a silver medal at the 1997 IAAF World Indoor Championships (First American to bring back a medal in the pole vault in a major competition since 1987). He is the current American Indoor Record Holder at 5.96m (19' - 6.5") set March 3, 2001]. His personal best jump is 5.98m (19' - 7.5"), which he achieved in 1996.

Johnson is one of the United States' most decorated pole vaulters. His accomplishments include 2x HS National Champion, 7x SEC Champion, 4x NCAA Champion, 7x US Champion, World Champion, & Olympic silver medalist. He still holds many stadium and meet records, as well as collegiate records.

Johnson is also the first black pole vaulter to medal and step on the podium, which he achieved at the 2000 Olympic Games. He is the first black pole vaulter to win in a major competition (won silver in Paris in 1997), and the first black pole vaulter to make the Olympic Team in the Pole Vault, which he achieved at the 1996 Olympic Trials.

== Achievements ==
Year	Tournament	Venue	Result	Event
1996	Olympic Games	Atlanta, United States	8th	Pole vault
1997	IAAF World Indoor Championships	Paris, France	2nd	Pole vault
1997	IAAF Grand Prix Final	Fukuoka, Japan	5th	Pole vault
2000	Olympic Games	Sydney, Australia	2nd	Pole vault
2001	IAAF World Indoor Championships	Lisbon, Portugal	1st	Pole vault
