= José Parrilla =

American middle-distance runner

Medal record

Men's Athletics

Representing United States

Pan American Junior Athletics Championships
Gold medal – first place	1991 Kingston	800 m

Jose Antonio "Tony" Parrilla Jr. (born 31 March 1972 in Ancón, Panama) is an American middle-distance runner who specialized in the 800 meters. He finished sixth at the 1995 World Championships in Athletics in Gothenburg. Known for coming from behind with a strong finishing kick, his personal best 800 m time is 1:43.97, set at the 1992 U.S. Olympic Trials. He also qualified for the U.S. team at the 1996 Summer Olympics, making him a two-time Olympian. He also ran in the 1993 World Championships.

While running for the University of Tennessee he won three successive NCAA Championships from 1992 to 1994, a feat only duplicated twice before (by Charles Hornbostel and John Woodruff), both from the 1930s.

He adopted Puerto Rican nationality in 2000.

His oldest son, of the same name, followed both his parents to run at the University of Tennessee starting in 2016.
