= Leigh Smith (javelin thrower) =

American athlete (born 1981)

Leigh Smith (born August 28, 1981) is an American athlete who qualified for the 2008 Olympics in javelin throw. He was one of only two Americans to meet the Olympic A standard for the 2008 Summer Olympics. He threw a personal best 83.74 m (274.7 feet) at Athens, Georgia on May 9, 2008. Smith was a three-time All-American at the University of Tennessee.

== Achievements ==
Year	Tournament	Venue	Result	Distance
2008	Olympic Games	Beijing, China	18th	76.55 m

== Seasonal bests by year ==
- 2004 – 81.67
- 2005 – 79.37
- 2006 – 82.33
- 2007 – 77.24
- 2008 – 83.74
