= Godson Oghenebrume =

Nigerian athlete

Godson Brume
Personal information
- Full name: Godson Oke Oghenebrume
- Nationality: Nigerian
- Born: 27 May 2003 (age 23) Ughelli, Delta State, Nigeria

Sport
- Sport: Athletics
- Event: Sprint

Achievements and titles
- Personal bests: 100m: 9.90 (Austin, 2023); 200m: 20.72 (Baton Rouge, 2023)
Medal record
Representing Nigeria
Men's athletics
African Championships
Silver medal – second place	2024 Douala	4×100 m relay

Godson Oke Oghenebrume (born 27 May 2003) is a Nigerian track and field athlete who competes as a sprinter.

== Early life ==
From Ughelli, Nigeria, he attended Onoriede International School. He received a scholarship to study at Louisiana State University in 2022.

== Career ==
He ran the third fastest U20 100m in the world during the 2021 season with a time of 10.13 at the Nigerian Trials. He was named as an alternate for the Nigerian relay team at the delayed 2020 Olympic Games and attended the team’s pre-Games training camp in Abuja.

In April 2023 he dipped below the 10 second barrier for the 100m for first time, running a wind assisted 9.97s at the LSU Alumni Gold in Baton Rouge. A week later, he beat Erriyon Knighton in the 100m at the LSU Invitational event in Baton Rouge. His Louisiana State University 4x100m relay team, also containing Brandon Hicklin and Da'Marcus Fleming, set a new college record of 37.90 seconds at the SEC Championship in Baton Rouge in June 2023.

Running for LSU at the 2023 NCAA Division I Outdoor Track and Field Championships, held in Austin, Texas in June 2023, Oghenebrume ran his 100m heat in 9.93s. He improved it to 9.90s in the final, and finished second to Courtney Lindsey of Texas Tech. The U.S. Track & Field and Cross-Country Coaches Association named Oghenebrume the South-Central Region Men’s Track Athlete of the Year in June 2023.

He ran 9.99 seconds for the 100 metres to win the SEC Outdoor Championships in Gainesville, Florida on 11 May 2024. In June 2024, he was part of the Nigeria 4x100m relay team that won silver at the African Championships in Douala, Cameroon. In July 2024, he was officially named as part of the Nigerian team for the 2024 Paris Olympics, although he later had to withdraw through injury.

== Controversy ==
On 7 February 2025, he was arrested in Baton Rouge after discharching a firearm multiple times. He later pleaded guilty to unlawful possession of a firearm by a foreign national in the United States. The following year, he was sentenced to 27 months in federal prison with expected deportation from the United States upon completion of the sentence.

== Personal life ==
He is the younger brother of fellow athlete and Olympic medalist Ese Brume. He has another sister, Karo Brume, who competes in sprints and won an athletic scholarship for the University of Texas.
