= Da'Marcus Fleming =

American athlete (born 2001)

Personal information
- Nationality: American
- Born: 21 December 2001 (age 24)

Sport
- Sport: Athletics
- Event: Sprint

Achievements and titles
- Personal bests: 60m: 6.60 (Albuquerque, 2022); 100m: 9.97 (Austin, 2023); 200m: 20.42 (Gainesville, 2024)

Da'Marcus Fleming (born 21 December 2001) is an American track and field athlete who competes as a sprinter.

== Early life ==
Fleming attended Miami Northwestern Senior High School, and was number one ranked high school athlete in both 100m and 200m when the track season was halted by the COVID-19 pandemic. In 2020, he signed a letter of intent to join Louisiana State University.

== Career ==
=== 2022 ===
He secured a second place at the LSU Invitational 100 metres race in April 2022, running 10.02 seconds in Baton Rouge. Competing collegiately as a junior in 2022, his Louisiana State University team baton issues, not completing at the SEC Championships and being disqualified from the NCAA preliminaries for exchanging the baton outside the change zone.

=== 2023 ===
He finished ahead of Erriyon Knighton in the 100m at the LSU Invitational event in Baton Rouge, in April 2023. His LSU 4 × 100 m relay team set a new college record of 37.90 seconds at the SEC Championship in Baton Rouge in June 2023. He also qualified for the individual 100 metres at the NCAA Championships held in Texas in June 2023. At the event, he finished fourth overall in the 100 metres, breaking the 10-second barrier to run 9.97 seconds. Additionally, the LSU 4 × 100 m relay team consisting of Fleming, Brandon Hicklin, Dorian Camel, and Godson Oghenebrume won the gold medal.

Competing at the 2023 USA Outdoor Track and Field Championships, in Eugene, Oregon, he reached the semi-finals of the 100m competition.

=== 2024 ===
He was runner-up at the LSU Alumni Gold meet in Baton Rouge, running the 100 metres in a time of 10.03 seconds, beaten by Devin Augustine by one hundredth of a second. His LSU 4 × 100 m really team won the SEC Championship race in Florida in May 2024.
