= 2023 NCAA Division I Outdoor Track and Field Championships =

College track and field competition

- Edition: 101st (Men); 41st (Women)
- Dates: June 7–10, 2023
- Host city: Austin, Texas; University of Texas at Austin
- Venue: Mike A. Myers Stadium
- Events: 42 (21 men's and 21 women's)

The 2023 NCAA Division I Outdoor Track and Field Championships was the 101st NCAA Division I Men's Outdoor Track and Field Championships and the 41st NCAA Division I Women's Outdoor Track and Field Championships. Mike A. Myers Stadium in Austin, Texas, on the campus of the University of Texas, hosted the competition's 42 events (21 men's and 21 women's) from June 7 to June 10, starting with the men's decathlon and ending with the women's 4 × 400-meter relay. Men's events were held Wednesday and Friday, and women's events were held Thursday and Saturday, with the exception of the men's decathlon which extended from Wednesday into Thursday and the women's heptathlon which began Friday and ended Saturday.

== Streaming and television coverage ==
ESPN streamed the competition on ESPN2, ESPN3, and ESPNU.

== Results ==
=== Men ===
==== 100 meters ====
Wind: +1.8 m/s

| Rank | Athlete | Nationality | Team | Time | Notes |
|---|---|---|---|---|---|
| 1st place, gold medalist(s) | Courtney Lindsey | United States | Texas Tech | 9.89 | =CL |
| 2nd place, silver medalist(s) | Godson Oghenebrume | Nigeria | LSU | 9.90 | PB |
| 3rd place, bronze medalist(s) | Shaun Maswanganyi | South Africa | Houston | 9.91 | PB |
| 4 | Da'Marcus Fleming | United States | LSU | 9.97 [.964] | PB |
| 5 | PJ Austin | United States | Florida | 9.97 [.969] | |
| 6 | Udodi Onwuzurike | Nigeria | Stanford | 9.98 | |
| 7 | Micah Williams | United States | Oregon | 9.99 | SB |
| 8 | Favour Ashe | Nigeria | Auburn | 10.02 | |
| 9 | Cole Beck | United States | Virginia Tech | 10.05 | |

==== 200 meters ====
Wind: +0.9 m/s

| Rank | Athlete | Nationality | Team | Time | Notes |
|---|---|---|---|---|---|
| 1st place, gold medalist(s) | Udodi Onwuzurike | Nigeria | Stanford | 19.84 | |
| 2nd place, silver medalist(s) | Courtney Lindsey | United States | Texas Tech | 19.86 | PB |
| 3rd place, bronze medalist(s) | Terrence Jones | Bahamas | Texas Tech | 19.87 | PB |
| 4 | Robert Gregory | United States | Florida | 19.89 | PB |
| 5 | Tarsis Orogot | Uganda | Alabama | 20.03 | |
| 6 | Shaun Maswanganyi | South Africa | Houston | 20.07 | |
| 7 | David Dunlap | United States | Northern Arizona | 20.16 | PB |
| 8 | Cameron Miller | United States | Louisville | 20.30 | |
| 9 | Javonte Harding | United States | Tennessee | 20.90 | |

==== 400 meters ====
| Rank | Athlete | Nationality | Team | Time | Notes |
|---|---|---|---|---|---|
| 1st place, gold medalist(s) | Emmanuel Bamidele | Nigeria | Florida | 44.24 | CL |
| 2nd place, silver medalist(s) | Ryan Willie | United States | Florida | 44.25 | PB |
| 3rd place, bronze medalist(s) | Emmanuel Bynum | United States | Tennessee | 44.49 | PB |
| 4 | Justin Robinson | United States | Arizona State | 44.51 | PB |
| 5 | Dubem Nwachukwu | United States | Arizona State | 44.92 | |
| 6 | Reheem Hayles | United States | North Carolina A&T | 45.22 | |
| 7 | JeVaughn Powell | Jamaica | Florida | 45.32 | |
| 8 | Gamali Felix | Grenada | Arizona State | 45.34 | |
| 9 | Elija Godwin | United States | Georgia | DNS | |

==== 800 meters ====
| Rank | Athlete | Nationality | Team | Time | Notes |
|---|---|---|---|---|---|
| 1st place, gold medalist(s) | Will Sumner | United States | Georgia | 1:44.26 | |
| 2nd place, silver medalist(s) | Yusuf Bizimana | United Kingdom | Texas | 1:45.74 | PB |
| 3rd place, bronze medalist(s) | Handal Roban | Saint Vincent and the Grenadines | Penn State | 1:45.95 | PB |
| 4 | Abdullahi Hassan | Canada | Wisconsin | 1:46.30 | |
| 5 | Conor Murphy | Ireland | Virginia | 1:46.43 | PB |
| 6 | Mehdi Yanouri | United States | Oklahoma State | 1:46.50 | PB |
| 7 | Aidan McCarthy | United States | Cal Poly | 1:46.78 | |
| 8 | Tiarnan Crorken | United Kingdom | Ole Miss | 1:46.81 | PB |
| 9 | Crayton Carrozza | United States | Texas | 1:47.23 | |

==== 1500 meters ====
| Rank | Athlete | Nationality | Team | Time | Notes |
|---|---|---|---|---|---|
| 1st place, gold medalist(s) | Nathan Green | United States | Washington | 3:42.78 | |
| 2nd place, silver medalist(s) | Joe Waskom | United States | Washington | 3:42.93 | |
| 3rd place, bronze medalist(s) | Adam Spencer | Australia | Wisconsin | 3:42.98 | |
| 4 | Anass Essayi | Morocco | South Carolina | 3:43.31 | |
| 5 | Isaac Basten | United States | Drake | 3:43.33 | |
| 6 | Jesse Hunt | Australia | North Carolina | 3:43.40 | |
| 7 | Ezekiel Rop | United States | Iowa State | 3:43.59 | |
| 8 | Evan Dorenkamp | United States | Penn State | 3:44.20 | |
| 9 | Fouad Messaoudi | Morocco | Oklahoma State | 3:44.41 | |
| 10 | Luke Houser | United States | Washington | 3:44.61 | |
| 11 | Liam Murphy | United States | Villanova | 3:45.72 | |
| 12 | Ethan Strand | United States | North Carolina | 3:47.01 | |

==== 5000 meters ====
| Rank | Athlete | Nationality | Team | Time | Notes |
|---|---|---|---|---|---|
| 1st place, gold medalist(s) | Ky Robinson | Australia | Stanford | 14:04.77 | |
| 2nd place, silver medalist(s) | Graham Blanks | United States | Harvard | 14:06.53 | |
| 3rd place, bronze medalist(s) | Jackson Sharp | Australia | Wisconsin | 14:06.77 | |
| 4 | Luke Tewalt | United States | Wake Forrest | 14:07.18 | |
| 5 | Parker Wolfe | United States | North Carolina | 14:07.50 | |
| 6 | Charles Hicks | United Kingdom | Stanford | 14:09.03 | |
| 7 | Carter Solomon | United States | Notre Dame | 14:09.57 | |
| 8 | Nico Young | United States | Northern Arizona | 14:10.17 | |
| 9 | Brian Fay | Ireland | Washington | 14:11.13 | |
| 10 | James Mwaura | United States | Gonzaga | 14:11.82 | |
| 11 | Casey Clinger | United States | BYU | 14:12.54 | |
| 12 | Yaseen Abdalla | Sudan | Tennessee | 14:14.16 | |
| 13 | Toby Gillen | Australia | Saint Louis | 14:14.36 | |
| 14 | Simon Bedard | France | Butler | 14:19.10 | |
| 15 | Sam Gilman | United States | Air Force | 14:19.91 | |
| 16 | Nicholas Bendtsen | United States | Princeton | 14:22.79 | |
| 17 | Chandler Gibbens | United States | Kansas | 14:24.71 | |
| 18 | Antonio Lopez Segura | Spain | Virginia Tech | 14:27.70 | |
| 19 | David Mullarkey | United Kingdom | Florida State | 14:28.89 | |
| 20 | Eli Bennett | United States | Air Force | 14:30.36 | |
| 21 | Zach Facioni | Australia | Wake Forrest | 14:37.57 | |
| 22 | Matt Strangio | United States | Portland | 14:45.44 | |
| 23 | Brian Masai | Kenya | Akron | 14:49.31 | |
| 24 | Dylan Jacobs | United States | Tennessee | DNS | |

==== 10000 meters ====
| Rank | Athlete | Nationality | Team | Time | Notes |
|---|---|---|---|---|---|
| 1st place, gold medalist(s) | Ky Robinson | Australia | Stanford | 28:10.96 | |
| 2nd place, silver medalist(s) | Charles Hicks | United Kingdom | Stanford | 28:12.20 | |
| 3rd place, bronze medalist(s) | Casey Clinger | United States | BYU | 28:13.63 | |
| 4 | James Mwaura | United States | Gonzaga | 28:14.64 | SB |
| 5 | Isai Rodriguez | United States | Oklahoma St | 28:15.48 | SB |
| 6 | Graham Blanks | United States | Harvard | 28:15.90 | PB |
| 7 | Barry Keane | Ireland | Butler | 28:17.21 | |
| 8 | Patrick Kiprop | Kenya | Arkansas | 28:27.54 | |
| 9 | Victor Kiprop | Kenya | Alabama | 28:29.28 | |
| 10 | Cormac Dalton | Ireland | Tulsa | 28:35.83 | |
| 11 | Kirami Yego | Kenya | South Alabama | 28:57.61 | |
| 12 | Nickolas Scudder | United States | Charlotte | 28:58.15 | |
| 13 | Scott Beattie | United Kingdom | Tulsa | 29:10.31 | |
| 14 | Dylan Jacobs | United States | Tennessee | 29:12.47 | |
| 15 | Bob Liking | United States | Wisconsin | 29:15.10 | |
| 16 | Brandon Garnica | United States | BYU | 29:38.56 | |
| 17 | Paul O'Donnell | Ireland | Syracuse | 29:41.18 | |
| 18 | Aidan O'Gorman | United States | North Florida | 29:43.69 | |
| 19 | Haftu Strintzos | Australia | Villanova | 29:45.22 | |
| 20 | Perry Mackinnon | Canada | Cornell | 29:46.87 | |
| 21 | Alex Maier | United States | Oklahoma St | 29:57.86 | |
| 22 | Ben Perrin | United States | Montana St | 29:58.53 | |
| 23 | Acer Iverson | United States | Harvard | 30:35.64 | |
| - | Marcelo Rocha | United States | Providence | DNF | |

==== 110-meter hurdles ====
Wind: +1.8 m/s

| Rank | Athlete | Nationality | Team | Time | Notes |
|---|---|---|---|---|---|
| 1st place, gold medalist(s) | Phillip Lemonious | Jamaica | Arkansas | 13.24 | |
| 2nd place, silver medalist(s) | De'Vion Wilson | United States | Houston | 13.26 | |
| 3rd place, bronze medalist(s) | Jaheem Hayles | Jamaica | Syracuse | 13.28 | |
| 4 | Omotade Ojora | United Kingdom | USC | 13.29 | |
| 5 | Giano Roberts | Jamaica | Clemson | 13.31 | |
| 6 | Darius Luff | United States | Nebraska | 13.38 | |
| 7 | Connor Schulman | United States | Texas A&M | 13.47 | |
| 8 | Rasheem Brown | Cayman Islands | Tennessee | 13.50 | |
| - | Cameron Murray | United States | NC State | DNF | |

==== 400-meter hurdles ====
| Rank | Athlete | Nationality | Team | Time | Notes |
|---|---|---|---|---|---|
| 1st place, gold medalist(s) | Chris Robinson | United States | Alabama | 48.12 | |
| 2nd place, silver medalist(s) | Corde Long | United States | Alabama | 48.53 | |
| 3rd place, bronze medalist(s) | Nathaniel Eziekel | Nigeria | Baylor | 48.5 | |
| 4 | Caleb Dean | United States | Texas Tech | 48.56 | |
| 5 | Rasheeme Griffith | Barbados | Tennessee | 49.17 | |
| 6 | Caleb Cavanaugh | United States | Georgia | 49.20 | |
| 7 | Cass Elliott | United States | Washington | 49.21 | |
| 8 | James Smith II | United States | Texas A&M | 49.21 | |
| 9 | Craig Saddler II | United States | North Carolina | 49.70 | |

==== 3000-meter steeplechase ====
| Rank | Athlete | Nationality | Team | Time | Notes |
|---|---|---|---|---|---|
| 1st place, gold medalist(s) | Kenneth Rooks | United States | BYU | 8:26.17 | |
| 2nd place, silver medalist(s) | Duncan Hamilton | United States | Montana State | 8:32.18 | |
| 3rd place, bronze medalist(s) | Victor Kibiego | Kenya | UTEP | 8:32.49 | |
| 4 | Nathan Mountain | United States | Virginia | 8:35.99 | |
| 5 | Matthew Wilkinson | United States | Minnesota | 8:36.12 | |
| 6 | Adbelhakim Abouzouhir | Morocco | Eastern Kentucky | 8:36.19 | |
| 7 | Victor Shitsama | Kenya | Oklahoma State | 8:36.79 | |
| 8 | Derek Johnson | United States | Virginia | 8:37.29 | |
| 9 | Ed Trippas | Australia | Washington | 8:39.63 | |
| 10 | Peter Herold | United States | UCLA | 8:43.68 | |
| 11 | Carson Williams | United States | Furman | 8:53.75 | |
| 12 | Kevin Robertson | Canada | Syracuse | 9:04.02 | |

==== 4 × 100-meter relay ====
| Rank | Team | Time | Notes |
|---|---|---|---|
| 1st place, gold medalist(s) | LSU | 38.05 | |
| 2nd place, silver medalist(s) | Florida | 38.26 | |
| 3rd place, bronze medalist(s) | Florida State | 38.29 | |
| 4 | Arizona State | 38.54 | |
| 5 | Alabama State | 38.79 | |
| 6 | Louisville | 38.81 | |
| | Iowa | DNF | |
| | Georgia | DNF | |
| | Texas Tech | DQ | |

==== 4 × 400-meter relay ====
| Rank | Team | Time | Notes |
|---|---|---|---|
| 1st place, gold medalist(s) | Florida | 2:57.74 | |
| 2nd place, silver medalist(s) | Arizona State | 2:57.78 | |
| 3rd place, bronze medalist(s) | UCLA | 2:59.82 | |
| 4 | Alabama | 3:00.81 | |
| 5 | Texas A&M | 3:00.90 | |
| 6 | Baylor | 3:01.63 | |
| 7 | Georgia | 3:03.22 | |
| 8 | Arkansas | 3:03.66 | |
| 9 | Clemson | DNF | |

==== Long jump ====
| Rank | Athlete | Team | Mark | Wind (m/s) | Notes |
|---|---|---|---|---|---|
| 1st place, gold medalist(s) | (Jamaica) Carey McLeod | Arkansas | 8.26 m (27 ft 1 in) | +1.3 | |
| 2nd place, silver medalist(s) | (Jamaica) Wayne Pinnock | Arkansas | 8.15 m (26 ft 8 3/4 in) | +1.3 | |
| 3rd place, bronze medalist(s) | (Jamaica) Jordan Turner | Kentucky | 8.13 m (26 ft 8 in) | +1.1 | |
| 4 | (United States) Malcolm Clemons | Florida | 8.07 m (26 ft 5 1/2 in) | +0.4 | |
| 5 | (United States) Cameron Crump | Mississippi State | 7.91 m (25 ft 11 1/4 in) | +0.8 | |
| 6 | (Jamaica) Nikaoli Williams | Oklahoma | 7.90 m (25 ft 11 in) | +0.8 | |
| 7 | (United States) Jeremiah Davis | Florida State | 7.88 m (25 ft 10 in) | +1.0 | |
| 8 | (United States) Brandon Hicklin | LSU | 7.86 m (25 ft 9 1/4 in) | +1.3 | |
| 9 | (United States) Sincere Robinson | Rutgers | 7.83 m (25 ft 8 1/4 in) | +1.0 | |
| 10 | (United States) Chrstyn John Stevenson | USC | 7.79 m (25 ft 6 1/2 in) | +1.0 | |
| 11 | (Cayman Islands) Louis Gordon | Albany | 7.77 m (25 ft 5 3/4 in) | +1.0 | |
| 12 | (Germany) Till Steinforth | Nebraska | 7.73 m (25 ft 4 1/4 in) | +0.6 | |
| 13 | (United States) Russell Robinson | Miami | 7.70 m (25 ft 3 in) | +1.3 | |
| 14 | (United States) Chris Preddie | Texas State | 7.70 m (25 ft 3 in) | +1.3 | |
| 15 | (India) Lokesh Sathyanathan | New Mexico | 7.66 m (25 ft 1 1/2 in) | +1.1 | |
| 16 | (United States) Robbie Springfield | Kentucky | 7.60 m (24 ft 11 in) | +1.0 | |
| 17 | (United States) Ajamu Reed | San Jose State | 7.59 m (24 ft 10 3/4 in) | +1.0 | |
| 18 | (United Kingdom) Jake Burkey | New Mexico | 7.54 m (24 ft 8 3/4 in) | +0.9 | |
| 19 | (United States) Marc Morrison | Connecticut | 7.52 m (24 ft 8 in) | +0.8 | |
| 20 | (Italy) Kareem Mersal | Wyoming | 7.44 m (24 ft 4 3/4 in) | +1.5 | |
| 21 | (United States) Queshun Watson-Riggins | Florida International | 7.42 m (24 ft 4 in) | +0.6 | |
| 22 | (United States) Cedar English | Southern Utah | 7.36 m (24 ft 1 3/4 in) | +0.6 | |
| 23 | (United States) Zachary Love | Brown | 7.10 m (23 ft 3 1/2 in) | +0.9 | |
| 24 | (United States) John Kroeger | Stanford | 7.00 m (22 ft 11 1/2 in) | +0.9 | |

==== Triple jump ====
| Rank | Athlete | Team | Mark | Wind (m/s) | Notes |
|---|---|---|---|---|---|
| 1st place, gold medalist(s) | (Jamaica) Jaydon Hibbert | Arkansas | 17.56 m (57 ft 7 1/4 in) | -0.3 | FR |
| 2nd place, silver medalist(s) | (United States) Russell Robinson | Miami | 16.94 m (55 ft 6 3/4 in) | +1.1 | |
| 3rd place, bronze medalist(s) | (United States) Jeremiah Davis | Florida State | 16.67 m (54 ft 8 1/4 in) | +1.2 | |
| 4 | (United States) Sean Dixon-Bodie | Florida | 16.61 m (54 ft 5 3/4 in) | +0.3 | |
| 5 | (United States) Salif Mane | Fairleigh Dickinson | 16.46 m (54 ft 0 in) | +1.6 | |
| 6 | (Jamaica) Owayne Owens | Virginia | 16.36 m (53 ft 8 in) | +1.1 | |
| 7 | (Jamaica) Malik Cunningham | Villanova | 16.17 m (53 ft 1/2 in) | +1.0 | |
| 8 | (Jamaica) Astley Davis | Southern Utah | 16.17 m (53 ft 1/2 in) | +0.9 | |
| 9 | (Canada) Praise Aniamaka | Purdue | 16.10 m (52 ft 9 3/4 in) | +0.4 | |
| 10 | (United States) Brandon Green | Oklahoma | 16.06 m (52 ft 8 1/4 in) | +1.0 | |
| 11 | (Jamaica) Carey McLeod | Arkansas | 15.99 m (52 ft 5 1/2 in) | +1.1 | |
| 12 | (Jamaica) Ryan Brown | Arkansas | 15.89 m (52 ft 1 1/2 in) | -0.2 | |
| 13 | (United States) James Carter | Iowa | 15.69 m (51 ft 5 1/2 in) | +1.3 | |
| 14 | (United States) Jamar Davis | NC State | 15.65 m (51 ft 4 in) | -0.1 | |
| 15 | (United States) Garison Breeding | Tennessee | 15.56 m (51 ft 1/2 in) | +0.8 | |
| 16 | (Jamaica) Chad Williams | Texas Southern | 15.51 m (50 ft 10 1/2 in) | +2.0 | |
| 17 | (United States) Keyshawn King | Texas Tech | 15.35 m (50 ft 4 1/4 in) | +1.3 | |
| 18 | (Zimbabwe) Theophilus Mudzengerere | TCU | 15.32 m (50 ft 3 in) | +1.0 | |
| 19 | (United States) Kelvin Campbell | Kennesaw State | 14.94 m (49 ft 0 in) | +1.0 | |
| 20 | (United States) Jalyn Jackson | UCLA | 14.93 m (48 ft 11 3/4 in) | +0.3 | |
| | (United States) Bobby Say | Eastern Washington | NM | | |
| | (United States) Allam Bushara | Colorado State | NM | | |

==== High jump ====
| Rank | Athlete | Team | 2.06 | 2.11 | 2.16 | 2.21 | 2.24 | 2.27 | 2.30 | Mark | Notes |
|---|---|---|---|---|---|---|---|---|---|---|---|
| 1st place, gold medalist(s) | (Jamaica) Romaine Beckford | South Florida | - | o | o | o | xo | o | xxx | 2.27 m (7 ft 5 1/4 in) | PB |
| 2nd place, silver medalist(s) | (United States) Vernon Turner | Oklahoma | - | o | o | o | xxo | o | xxx | 2.27 m (7 ft 5 1/4 in) | |
| 3rd place, bronze medalist(s) | (Mexico) Roberto Vilches | Missouri | o | o | o | o | xo | xxx | | 2.24 m (7 ft 4 in) | SB |
| 4 | (Serbia) Slavko Stevic | Southeastern Louisiana | o | o | o | xxx | | | | 2.16 m (7 ft 1 in) | |
| 4 | (The Bahamas) Shaun Miller Jr. | Ohio State | - | o | o | xxx | | | | 2.16 m (7 ft 1 in) | |
| 4 | (United States) Trey Allen | Louisville | - | o | o | xxx | | | | 2.16 m (7 ft 1 in) | |
| 4 | (United States) Tony Jones | Mississippi State | - | o | o | xxx | | | | 2.16 m (7 ft 1 in) | |
| 4 | (United States) Tyus Wilson | Nebraska | o | o | o | xxx | | | | 2.16 m (7 ft 1 in) | |
| 9 | (United States) Elias Gerald | USC | o | xo | o | xxx | | | | 2.16 m (7 ft 1 in) | |
| 10 | (United States) Johnathan Jones | Little Rock | o | xxo | o | xxx | | | | 2.16 m (7 ft 1 in) | |
| 11 | (United States) Caleb Snowden | Arkansas-Pine Bluff | xxo | xo | o | xxx | | | | 2.16 m (7 ft 1 in) | |
| 12 | (United States) Dontavious Hill | Auburn | o | - | xo | xxx | | | | 2.16 m (7 ft 1 in) | |
| 13 | (United States) Carter Bajoit | Texas A&M | o | o | xxo | xxx | | | | 2.16 m (7 ft 1 in) | PB |
| 14 | (United States) Channing Furguson | USC Upstate | o | o | xxx | | | | | 2.11 m (6 ft 11 in) | |
| 14 | (United States) Alex Babbington | Illinois | o | o | xxx | | | | | 2.11 m (6 ft 11 in) | |
| 14 | (United States) Michael Hoffer | Nebraska | o | o | xxx | | | | | 2.11 m (6 ft 11 in) | |
| 14 | (United States) Sam Hurley | Texas | o | o | xxx | | | | | 2.11 m (6 ft 11 in) | |
| 18 | (United States) Brady Palen | Wichita State | o | xo | xxx | | | | | 2.11 m (6 ft 11 in) | |
| 19 | (United States) Joshua Moore | Eastern Kentucky | xo | xxo | xxx | | | | | 2.11 m (6 ft 11 in) | |
| 20 | (Jamaica) Beau Allen | Duke | o | xxx | | | | | | 2.06 m (6 ft 9 in) | |
| 20 | (Jamaica) Zayne Palomino | Southern Miss | o | xxx | | | | | | 2.06 m (6 ft 9 in) | |
| | (Czech Republic) Jakub Belik | UTEP | xxx | | | | | | | NH | |
| | (Turkey) Ali Eren Unlu | Louisiana–Monroe | - | xxx | | | | | | NH | |
| | (United States) Sherman Hawkins | Jackson State | - | xxx | | | | | | NH | |

==== Pole vault ====
| Rank | Athlete | Team | Mark | Notes |
|---|---|---|---|---|
| 1st place, gold medalist(s) | (South Africa) Kyle Rademeyer | South Alabama | 5.70 m (18 ft 8 1/4 in) | |
| 2nd place, silver medalist(s) | (United States) Hunter Garretson | Akron | 5.70 m (18 ft 8 1/4 in) | |
| 3rd place, bronze medalist(s) | (United States) Jacob Englar | Washington | 5.60 m (18 ft 4 1/4 in) | |
| 3rd place, bronze medalist(s) | (United States) Zach Bradford | Texas Tech | 5.60 m (18 ft 4 1/4 in) | |
| 5 | (United States) Clayton Simms | Kansas | 5.60 m (18 ft 4 1/4 in) | |
| 6 | (Norway) Sondre Guttormsen | Princeton | 5.60 m (18 ft 4 1/4 in) | |
| 6 | (United States) Caleb Witsken | BYU | 5.60 m (18 ft 4 1/4 in) | |
| 8 | (United States) Christyan Sampy | Houston | 5.45 m (17 ft 10 1/2 in) | |
| 8 | (United States) Ben Conacher | Baylor | 5.45 m (17 ft 10 1/2 in) | |
| 8 | (United States) Keaton Daniel | Kentucky | 5.45 m (17 ft 10 1/2 in) | |
| 11 | (United States) Alex Slinkman | Rice | 5.45 m (17 ft 10 1/2 in) | |
| 12 | (France) Dorian Chaigneau | Youngstown State | 5.45 m (17 ft 10 1/2 in) | |
| 13 | (United States) Nathan Stone | Indiana | 5.45 m (17 ft 10 1/2 in) | |
| 14 | (United States) Garrett Brown | Stanford | 5.45 m (17 ft 10 1/2 in) | |
| 15 | (United States) Zach Davis | Texas A&M | 5.30 m (17 ft 4 1/2 in) | |
| 15 | (United States) Trevor Stephenson | Michigan State | 5.30 m (17 ft 4 1/2 in) | |
| 15 | (United States) Luke Knipe | Penn State | 5.30 m (17 ft 4 1/2 in) | |
| 18 | (United States) William Staggs | Indiana State | 5.30 m (17 ft 4 1/2 in) | |
| 19 | (United States) Tyler Carrel | Indiana | 5.30 m (17 ft 4 1/2 in) | |
| 20 | (United States) Skyler Magula | California | 5.30 m (17 ft 4 1/2 in) | |
| 21 | (United States) Bradley Jelmert | Arkansas State | 5.30 m (17 ft 4 1/2 in) | |
| 22 | (United States) Scott Toney | Penn | 5.15 m (16 ft 10 3/4 in) | |
| | (United States) Branson Ellis | Stephen F. Austin | NM | |
| | (Norway) Simen Guttormsen | Princeton | NM | |

==== Shot put ====
| Rank | Athlete | Team | Mark | Notes |
|---|---|---|---|---|
| 1st place, gold medalist(s) | (United States) Jordan Geist | Arizona | 21.06 m (69 ft 1 in) | |
| 2nd place, silver medalist(s) | (United States) Turner Washington | Arizona State | 21.04 m (69 ft 1/4 in) | |
| 3rd place, bronze medalist(s) | (France) Fred Moudani-Likibi | Cincinnati | 20.54 m (67 ft 4 1/2 in) | |
| 4 | (United States) Maxwell Otterdahl | Nebraska | 20.52 m (67 ft 3 3/4 in) | |
| 5 | (United States) John Meyer | LSU | 20.44 m (67 ft 1/2 in) | |
| 6 | (United States) Hayden Tobias | Ohio State | 20.26 m (66 ft 5 1/2 in) | |
| 7 | (United States) Jordan West | Arkansas | 20.02 m (65 ft 8 in) | |
| 8 | (United States) Jeff Duensing | California | 19.98 m (65 ft 6 1/2 in) | |
| 9 | (Australia) Alexander Kilesnikoff | Harvard | 19.88 m (65 ft 2 1/2 in) | |
| 10 | (United States) Jonah Wilson | Nebraska | 19.75 m (64 ft 9 1/2 in) | |
| 11 | (United States) Tarik O'Hagan | Ole Miss | 19.73 m (64 ft 8 3/4 in) | |
| 12 | (United States) Joshua Sobota | Kentucky | 19.71 m (64 ft 7 3/4 in) | |
| 13 | (United States) Jason Swarens | Wisconsin | 19.58 m (64 ft 2 3/4 in) | |
| 14 | (Jamaica) Roje Stona | Arkansas | 19.47 m (63 ft 10 1/2 in) | |
| 15 | (Jamaica) Courtney Lawrence | Kennesaw State | 19.40 m (63 ft 7 3/4 in) | |
| 16 | (United States) Michael Shoaf | Notre Dame | 19.11 m (62 ft 8 1/4 in) | |
| 17 | (United States) Patrick Larrison | Kansas | 19.09 m (62 ft 7 1/2 in) | |
| 18 | (Canada) Youssef Koudssi | Arizona | 19.03 m (62 ft 5 in) | |
| 19 | (United States) Jeff Kline | Maryland | 18.77 m (61 ft 6 3/4 in) | |
| 20 | (United States) Zach Landa | Arizona | 18.75 m (61 ft 6 in) | |
| 21 | (United States) Patrick Piperi | Texas | 18.65 m (61 ft 2 1/4 in) | |
| 22 | (United States) Isaiah Rogers | Kennesaw State | 17.76 m (58 ft 3 in) | |
| 23 | (United States) Jamir Gibson | Georgia Tech | 17.37 m (56 ft 11 3/4 in) | |
| 24 | (United States) Bryan Hudson | Louisville | NM | |

==== Discus throw ====
| Rank | Athlete | Team | Mark | Notes |
|---|---|---|---|---|
| 1st place, gold medalist(s) | (United States) Turner Washington | Arizona State | 66.22 m (217 ft 3 in) | |
| 2nd place, silver medalist(s) | (Jamaica) Rojé Stona | Arkansas | 66.55 m (218 ft 4 in) | |
| 3rd place, bronze medalist(s) | (Lithuania) Mykolas Alekna | California | 63.25 m (207 ft 6 in) | |
| 4 | (Chile) Claudio Romero | LSU | 62.67 m (205 ft 7 1/4 in) | |
| 5 | (Jamaica) Kevin Nedrick | Liberty | 61.93 m (203 ft 2 in) | |
| 6 | (United States) Milton Ingragam | Florida State | 61.44 m (201 ft 6 3/4 in) | |
| 7 | (United States) Dallin Shurts | BYU | 61.27 m (201 ft 0 in) | |
| 8 | (United States) Elijah Mason | Washington | 61.10 m (200 ft 5 1/2 in) | |
| 9 | (Brazil) Alan de Falchi | Alabama | 60.44 m (198 ft 3 1/2 in) | |
| 10 | (United States) Robbie Zorawar Otal | Duke | 60.07 m (197 ft 3/4 in) | |
| 11 | (Canada) Youssef Koudssi | Arizona | 59.73 m (195 ft 11 1/2 in) | |
| 12 | (South Africa) Francois Prinsloo | South Alabama | 59.10 m (193 ft 10 3/4 in) | |
| 13 | (United States) Maxwell Otterdahl | Nebraska | 58.60 m (192 ft 3 in) | |
| 14 | (El Salvador) Carlos Alberto Aviles | Ohio State | 58.50 m (191 ft 11 in) | |
| 15 | (Canada) Jeremiah Nubbe | Texas | 57.94 m (190 ft 1 in) | |
| 16 | (Jamaica) Ralford Mullings | Arkansas | 57.68 m (189 ft 2 3/4 in) | |
| 17 | (United States) Zach Gehm | Youngstown State | 57.12 m (187 ft 4 3/4 in) | |
| 18 | (United States) Jamir Gibson | Georgia Tech | 56.75 m (186 ft 2 1/4 in) | |
| 19 | (United States) Devin Roberson | Texas Tech | 56.46 m (185 ft 2 3/4 in) | |
| 20 | (United States) Jonah Wilson | Nebraska | 55.81 m (183 ft 1 in) | |
| 21 | (United States) Noah Koch | Indiana | 55.40 m (181 ft 9 in) | |
| 22 | (United States) Anthony Harrison | Kennesaw State | 55.37 m (181 ft 7 3/4 in) | |
| 23 | (Greece) Dimitrios Pavlidis | Kansas | 54.27 m (178 ft 1/2 in) | |
| 24 | (United States) Zane Forist | Michigan | 54.17 m (177 ft 8 1/2 in) | |

==== Javelin throw ====
| Rank | Athlete | Team | Mark | Notes |
|---|---|---|---|---|
| 1st place, gold medalist(s) | (United States) Tzuriel Pedigo | LSU | 79.79 m (261 ft 9 1/4 in) | |
| 2nd place, silver medalist(s) | (United States) Ethan Dabbs | Virginia | 79.27 m (260 ft 3/4 in) | |
| 3rd place, bronze medalist(s) | (Nigeria) Chinecherem Prosper Nnamdi | Baylor | 78.36 m (257 ft 1 in) | |
| 4 | (United States) Marc Anthony Minichello | Georgia | 77.27 m (253 ft 6 in) | |
| 5 | (United States) Samuel Hankins | Texas A&M | 76.18 m (249 ft 11 in) | |
| 6 | (United States) Braden Presser | Navy | 76.00 m (249 ft 4 in) | |
| 7 | (United States) John Keenan | Notre Dame | 75.96 m (249 ft 2 1/2 in) | |
| 8 | (United States) Cameron Bates | BYU | 74.71 m (245 ft 1 1/4 in) | |
| 9 | (France) Remi Rougetet | Mississippi State | 73.41 m (240 ft 10 in) | |
| 10 | (United States) Jackson Morris | Colorado State | 73.21 m (240 ft 2 1/4 in) | |
| 11 | (Denmark) Arthur Petersen | Nebraska | 72.20 m (236 ft 10 1/2 in) | |
| 12 | (United States) Evan Niedrowski | Monmouth | 71.85 m (235 ft 8 1/2 in) | |
| 13 | (United States) Dash Sirmon | Nebraska | 70.20 m (230 ft 3 3/4 in) | |
| 14 | (United States) Luke Jackson | Duke | 70.18 m (230 ft 2 3/4 in) | |
| 15 | (United States) Chandler Ault | Washington | 69.62 m (228 ft 4 3/4 in) | |
| 16 | (United States) Benji Phillips | North Dakota State | 69.26 m (227 ft 2 3/4 in) | |
| 17 | (United States) Matt Kraft | North Dakota State | 68.81 m (225 ft 9 in) | |
| 18 | (United States) Lucas Frost | Rhode Island | 67.67 m (222 ft 0 in) | |
| 19 | (United States) Colin Winkler | Connecticut | 66.62 m (218 ft 6 3/4 in) | |
| 20 | (Barbados) Zion Hill | North Texas | 66.53 m (218 ft 3 1/4 in) | |
| 21 | (United States) Ethan Cocco | Clemson | 65.49 m (214 ft 10 1/4 in) | |
| 22 | (Canada) Jaren O'Riley | Arizona | 64.91 m (212 ft 11 1/2 in) | |
| 23 | (United States) Izac Canchola | Stephen F. Austin | 62.12 m (203 ft 9 1/2 in) | |
| 24 | (Trinidad and Tobago) Tyriq Horsford | Mississippi State | 61.44 m (201 ft 6 3/4 in) | |

==== Hammer throw ====
| Rank | Athlete | Team | 1 | 2 | 3 | 4 | 5 | 6 | Mark | Notes |
|---|---|---|---|---|---|---|---|---|---|---|
| 1st place, gold medalist(s) | (United Kingdom) Kenneth Ikeji | Harvard | 72.88 | 75.45 | 74.52 | 75.97 | 73.63 | 77.92 | 77.92 m (255 ft 7 1/2 in) | |
| 2nd place, silver medalist(s) | (Greece) Konstantinos Zaltos | Minnesota | X | 75.57 | 74.52 | 74.31 | 76.33 | X | 76.33 m (250 ft 5 in) | PB |
| 3rd place, bronze medalist(s) | (United States) Jordan Geist | Arizona | 75.97 | X | 73.74 | 72.20 | 74.00 | 75.18 | 75.97 m (249 ft 2 3/4 in) | PB |
| 4 | (Portugal) Decio Andrade | Miami (FL) | 71.71 | X | 73.73 | 72.30 | 72.81 | 72.12 | 73.73 m (241 ft 10 3/4 in) | |
| 5 | (Greece) Nikolaos Polychroniou | USC | 68.51 | 70.80 | 72.56 | 69.70 | X | 72.65 | 72.65 m (238 ft 4 in) | PB |
| 6 | (United States) Jake Kubiatowicz | Minnesota | 70.52 | 71.38 | 72.40 | 70.83 | 68.82 | X | 72.40 m (237 ft 6 1/4 in) | PB |
| 7 | (United States) Tyler Merkley | Penn State | X | 70.85 | X | 70.57 | 72.40 | X | 72.40 m (237 ft 6 1/4 in) | |
| 8 | (United States) Tarik Robinson-O'Hagan | Ole Miss | 69.32 | X | 71.38 | 68.09 | 68.44 | 69.38 | 71.38 m (234 ft 2 in) | PB |
| 9 | (Brazil) Alencar Chagas Pereira | Georgia | X | 69.67 | 70.20 | 67.03 | 68.87 | 68.18 | 70.20 m (230 ft 3 3/4 in) | |
| 10 | (United States) Jayden White | Washington | 70.07 | 68.28 | 67.77 | | | | 70.07 m (229 ft 10 1/2 in) | SB |
| 11 | (United States) Isaiah Rogers | Kennesaw State | 69.77 | 66.84 | 69.69 | | | | 69.77 m (228 ft 10 3/4 in) | |
| 12 | (New Zealand) Anthony Barmes | Drake | 69.67 | 68.46 | 68.36 | | | | 69.67 m (228 ft 6 3/4 in) | |
| 13 | (United States) Parker Feuerborn | Southeast Missouri | 64.10 | 63.99 | 68.91 | | | | 68.91 m (226 ft 3/4 in) | PB |
| 14 | (United States) Kade McCall | Kansas State | 67.56 | 65.01 | 68.72 | | | | 68.72 m (225 ft 5 1/2 in) | |
| 15 | (Sweden) Ivar Moisander | California | 67.51 | 67.46 | 68.47 | | | | 68.47 m (224 ft 7 1/2 in) | |
| 16 | (United States) William Gross | Akron | 64.99 | 65.56 | 67.45 | | | | 67.45 m (221 ft 3 1/2 in) | SB |
| 17 | (United States) Kyle Moison | Auburn | 65.37 | X | 67.38 | | | | 67.38 m (221 ft 3/4 in) | PB |
| 18 | (United States) Trevor Otterdahl | North Dakota State | X | X | 67.34 | | | | 67.34 m (220 ft 11 in) | |
| 19 | (United States) Robert Colantonio | Alabama | 67.27 | 66.20 | 65.23 | | | | 67.27 m (220 ft 8 1/4 in) | |
| 20 | (Spain) Aimar Genis Palma Simo | Arkansas State | 62.43 | 65.71 | 67.20 | | | | 67.20 m (220 ft 5 1/2 in) | |
| 21 | (United States) Kyle Brown | Auburn | 65.20 | X | 66.17 | | | | 66.17 m (217 ft 1 in) | |
| 22 | (United States) Erik Ebel | Auburn | 61.67 | 65.37 | 65.95 | | | | 65.95 m (216 ft 4 1/4 in) | |
| 23 | (Australia) James Joycey | North Carolina | 59.03 | 65.10 | X | | | | 65.10 m (213 ft 6 3/4 in) | |
| | (United States) Fabio Hessling | San Jose State | | | | | | | DNS | |

==== Decathlon ====
| Rank | Athlete | Team | Overall points | 100 m | LJ | SP | HJ | 400 m | 110 m H | DT | PV | JT | 1500 m |
|---|---|---|---|---|---|---|---|---|---|---|---|---|---|
| 1st place, gold medalist(s) | (Germany) Leo Neugebauer | Texas | 8836 | 949; 10.61 | 980; 7.68 m (25 ft 2 1/4 in) | 868; 16.27 m (53 ft 4 1/2 in)} | 840; 2.04 m (6 ft 8 1/4 in) | 954; 47.08 | 992; 14.10 | 976; 55.06 m (180 ft 7 1/2 in) | 976; 5.21 m (17 ft 1 in) | 700; 57.45 m (188 ft 5 3/4 in) | 631; 4:48.00 |
| 2nd place, silver medalist(s) | (United States) Kyle Garland | Georgia | 8630 | 945; 10.63 | 990; 7.72 m (25 ft 3 3/4 in) | 875; 16.39 m (53 ft 9 1/4 in)} | 840; 2.04 m (6 ft 8 1/4 in) | 920; 47.78 | 1035; 13.54 | 782; 45.74 m (150 ft 3/4 in) | 913; 5.01 m (16 ft 5 in) | 670; 55.46 m (181 ft 11 1/4 in) | 660; 4:43.27 |
| 3rd place, bronze medalist(s) | (United States) Austin West | Iowa | 8054 | 901; 10.82 | 888; 7.31 m (23 ft 11 3/4 in) | 739; 14.17 m (46 ft 5 3/4 in)} | 758; 1.95 m (6 ft 4 3/4 in) | 980; 46.56 | 917; 14.45 | 758; 44.55 m (146 ft 1 3/4 in) | 620; 4.01 m (13 ft 1 3/4 in) | 811; 64.85 m (212 ft 9 in) | 682; 4:39.75 |
| 4 | (Germany) Till Steinforth | Nebraska | 7991 | 924; 10.72 | 1027; 7.87 m (25 ft 9 3/4 in) | 725; 13.94 m (45 ft 8 3/4 in)} | 731; 1.92 m (6 ft 3 1/2 in) | 884; 48.52 | 949; 14.20 | 667; 40.10 m (131 ft 6 1/2 in) | 883; 4.91 m (16 ft 1 1/4 in) | 539; 46.66 m (153 ft 1 in) | 662; 4:42.99 |
| 5 | (United States) Heath Baldwin | Michigan State | 7919 | 789; 11.33 | 778; 6.85 m (22 ft 5 1/2 in) | 841; 15.83 m (51 ft 11 in)} | 758; 1.95 m (6 ft 4 3/4 in) | 819; 49.90 | 942; 14.25 | 699; 41.70 m (136 ft 9 1/2 in) | 793; 4.61 m (15 ft 1 1/4 in) | 850; 67.43 m (221 ft 2 1/2 in) | 650; 4:44.81 |
| 6 | (Puerto Rico) Yariel Soto Torrado | Arkansas | 7917 | 912; 10.77 | 975; 7.66 m (25 ft 1 1/2 in) | 728; 13.99 m (45 ft 10 3/4 in)} | 758; 1.95 m (6 ft 4 3/4 in) | 893; 48.34 | 816; 15.28 | 719; 42.69 m (140 ft 1/2 in) | 883; 4.91 m (16 ft 1 1/4 in) | 527; 45.82 m (150 ft 3 3/4 in) | 706; 4:36.01 |
| 7 | (United Kingdom) Jack Turner | UTSA | 7851 | 915; 10.76 | 866; 7.22 m (23 ft 8 1/4 in) | 648; 12.69 m (41 ft 7 1/2 in)} | 731; 1.92 m (6 ft 3 1/2 in) | 920; 47.78 | 854; 14.96 | 765; 44.90 m (147 ft 3 1/2 in) | 852; 4.81 m (15 ft 9 1/4 in) | 578; 49.29 m (161 ft 8 1/2 in) | 722; 4:33.47 |
| 8 | (United States) Ben Barton | BYU | 7815 | 919; 10.74 | 821; 7.03 m (23 ft 3/4 in) | 679; 13.19 m (43 ft 3 1/4 in)} | 813; 2.01 m (6 ft 7 in) | 964; 46.88 | 946; 14.22 | 608; 37.23 m (122 ft 1 1/2 in) | 734; 4.41 m (14 ft 5 1/2 in) | 629; 52.75 m (173 ft 3/4 in) | 702; 4:36.59 |
| 9 | (United States) Grant Levesque | Rice | 7739 | 938; 10.66 | 771; 6.82 m (22 ft 4 1/2 in) | 723; 13.92 m (45 ft 8 in)} | 731; 1.92 m (6 ft 3 1/2 in) | 835; 49.56 | 925; 14.39 | 644; 38.99 m (127 ft 11 in) | 976; 5.21 m (17 ft 1 in) | 575; 49.10 m (161 ft 1 in) | 621; 4:49.65 |
| 10 | (United States) Daniel Spejcher | Arkansas | 7688 | 845; 11.07 | 788; 6.89 m (22 ft 7 1/4 in) | 757; 14.47 m (47 ft 5 1/2 in)} | 679; 1.86 m (6 ft 1 in) | 808; 50.14 | 950; 14.19 | 789; 46.07 m (151 ft 1 3/4 in) | 852; 4.81 m (15 ft 9 1/4 in) | 614; 51.69 m (169 ft 7 in) | 606; 4:52.05 |
| 11 | (United States) Peyton Bair | Mississippi State | 7653 | 935; 10.67 | 866; 7.22 m (23 ft 8 1/4 in) | 690; 13.38 m (43 ft 10 3/4 in)} | 785; 1.98 m (6 ft 5 3/4 in) | 936; 47.45 | 945; 14.23 | 491; 31.35 m (102 ft 10 1/4 in) | 822; 4.71 m (15 ft 5 1/4 in) | 539; 46.62 m (152 ft 11 1/4 in) | 644; 4:45.86 |
| 12 | (United States) Joseph Keys | Texas Tech | 7646 | 823; 11.17 | 826; 7.05 m (23 ft 1 1/2 in) | 672; 13.07 m (42 ft 10 1/2 in)} | 785; 1.98 m (6 ft 5 3/4 in) | 795; 50.43 | 890; 14.67 | 678; 40.68 m (133 ft 5 1/2 in) | 793; 4.61 m (15 ft 1 1/4 in) | 655; 54.50 m (178 ft 9 1/2 in) | 729; 4:32.39 |
| 13 | (United Kingdom) Oliver Thorner | Washington | 7641 | 832; 11.13 | 727; 6.63 m (21 ft 9 in) | 687; 13.33 m (43 ft 8 3/4 in)} | 758; 1.95 m (6 ft 4 3/4 in) | 860; 49.03 | 820; 15.25 | 675; 40.50 m (132 ft 10 1/4 in) | 793; 4.61 m (15 ft 1 1/4 in) | 658; 54.67 m (179 ft 4 1/4 in) | 831; 4:17.13 |
| 14 | (Netherlands) Rafael Raap | Oregon | 7607 | 836; 11.11 | 857; 7.18 m (23 ft 6 1/2 in) | 738; 14.15 m (46 ft 5 in)} | 731; 1.92 m (6 ft 3 1/2 in) | 753; 51.37 | 828; 15.18 | 800; 46.61 m (152 ft 11 in) | 734; 4.41 m (14 ft 5 1/2 in) | 685; 56.47 m (185 ft 3 in) | 645; 4:45.75 |
| 15 | (United States) Ryan Talbot | Michigan State | 7488 | 876; 10.93 | 652; 6.30 m (20 ft 8 in) | 641; 12.57 m (41 ft 2 3/4 in)} | 679; 1.86 m (6 ft 1 in) | 907; 48.05 | 875; 14.79 | 828; 47.94 m (157 ft 3 1/4 in) | 676; 4.21 m (13 ft 9 1/2 in) | 678; 56.01 m (183 ft 9 in) | 676; 4:40.73 |
| 16 | (United States) Aiden Ouimet | Illinois | 7468 | 819; 11.19 | 795; 6.92 m (22 ft 8 1/4 in) | 677; 13.16 m (43 ft 2 in)} | 679; 1.86 m (6 ft 1 in) | 837; 49.51 | 856; 14.95 | 660; 39.78 m (130 ft 6 in) | 822; 4.71 m (15 ft 5 1/4 in) | 669; 55.41 m (181 ft 9 1/4 in) | 654; 4:44.23 |
| 17 | (Estonia) Kristo Simulask | Oklahoma | 7410 | 894; 10.85 | 828; 7.06 m (23 ft 1 3/4 in) | 680; 13.21 m (43 ft 4 in)} | 679; 1.86 m (6 ft 1 in) | 841; 49.43 | 820; 15.25 | 629; 38.26 m (125 ft 6 1/4 in) | 793; 4.61 m (15 ft 1 1/4 in) | 595; 50.46 m (165 ft 6 1/2 in) | 651; 4:44.67 |
| 18 | (United Kingdom) Joel McFarlane | UTSA | 7311 | 892; 10.86 | 833; 7.08 m (23 ft 2 1/2 in) | 692; 13.40 m (43 ft 11 1/2 in)} | 627; 1.80 m (5 ft 10 3/4 in) | 898; 48.23 | 753; 15.82 | 674; 40.46 m (132 ft 8 3/4 in) | 648; 4.11 m (13 ft 5 3/4 in) | 605; 51.12 m (167 ft 8 1/2 in) | 689; 4:38.61 |
| 19 | (Germany) Alexander Jung | Kansas | 6817 | 841; 11.09 | 697; 6.50 m (21 ft 3 3/4 in) | 653; 12.76 m (41 ft 10 1/4 in)} | NH | 833; 49.61 | 913; 14.48 | 765; 44.90 m (147 ft 3 1/2 in) | 883; 4.91 m (16 ft 1 1/4 in) | 572; 48.89 m (160 ft 4 3/4 in) | 660; 4:43.21 |
| 20 | (United States) Tayton Klein | Kansas | 6753 | 942; 10.64 | 940; 7.52 m (24 ft 8 in) | 563; 11.28 m (37 ft 0 in)} | 679; 1.86 m (6 ft 1 in) | 932; 47.54 | 869; 14.84 | 507; 32.15 m (105 ft 5 1/2 in) | 763; 4.51 m (14 ft 9 1/2 in) | 558; 47.90 m (157 ft 1 3/4 in) | DNF |
| 21 | (United States) Marcus Weaver | Arkansas | 4222 | 744; 11.54 | 723; 6.61 m (21 ft 8 in) | 804; 15.24 m (50 ft 0 in)} | 731; 1.92 m (6 ft 3 1/2 in) | DNF | DNF | 594; 36.50 m (119 ft 9 in) | NH | 626; 52.53 m (172 ft 4 in) | DNF |
| | (Germany) Paul Kallenberg | Louisville | DNF | 812; 11.12 | 823; 7.04 m (23 ft 1 in) | 763; 14.56 m (47 ft 9 in)} | 679; 1.86 m (6 ft 1 in) | 876; 48.68 | 767; 15.70 | 568; 35.22 m (115 ft 6 1/2 in) | 822; 4.71 m (15 ft 5 1/4 in) | DNS | DNS |
| | (United States) Hakim McMorris | California | DNF | 924; 10.72 | 918; 7.43 m (24 ft 4 1/2 in) | 733; 14.08 m (46 ft 2 1/4 in)} | 813; 2.01 m (6 ft 7 in) | 808; 50.15 | DNF | DNS | DNS | DNS | DNS |
| | (United States) John Murray | Auburn | DNF | 841; 11.09 | 753; 6.74 m (22 ft 1 1/4 in) | 744; 14.25 m (46 ft 9 in)} | DNS | DNS | DNF | DNS | DNS | DNS | DNS |

=== Women ===
==== 100 meters ====
Wind: +2.3 m/s

| Rank | Athlete | Team | Time | Notes |
|---|---|---|---|---|
| 1st place, gold medalist(s) | (Saint Lucia) Julien Alfred | Texas | 10.72 | |
| 2nd place, silver medalist(s) | (United States) Kennedy Blackmon | Oklahoma | 10.87 | |
| 3rd place, bronze medalist(s) | (United States) Jacious Sears | Tennessee | 10.94 | |
| 4 | (United States) Kaila Jackson | Georgia | 10.96 | |
| 5 | (Jamaica) Kevona Davis | Texas | 10.98 | |
| 6 | (Nigeria) Rosemary Chukwuma | Texas Tech | 11.03 | |
| 7 | (United States) Ezinne Abba | Texas | 11.07 | |
| 8 | (United States) Dajaz Defrand | Florida State | 11.08 | |
| 9 | (United States) McKenzie Long | Ole Miss | 11.13 | |

==== 200 meters ====
Wind: +2.5 m/s

| Rank | Athlete | Team | Time | Notes |
|---|---|---|---|---|
| 1st place, gold medalist(s) | (Saint Lucia) Julien Alfred | Texas | 21.73 | |
| 2nd place, silver medalist(s) | (United States) McKenzie Long | Ole Miss | 21.88 | |
| 3rd place, bronze medalist(s) | (Jamaica) Kevona Davis | Texas | 22.02 | |
| 4 | (United States) Jacious Sears | Tennessee | 22.04 | |
| 5 | (United States) Lanae Thomas | Texas | 22.36 | |
| 6 | (United States) Caisja Chandler | USC | 22.37 | |
| 7 | (United States) Talitha Diggs | Florida | 22.45 | |
| 8 | (United States) Karimad Davis | Kentucky | 22.48 | |
| 9 | (United States) Kennedy Blackmon | Oklahoma | 22.53 | |

==== 400 meters ====
| Rank | Athlete | Team | Time | Notes |
|---|---|---|---|---|
| 1st place, gold medalist(s) | (Republic of Ireland) Rhasidat Adeleke | Texas | 49.20 | |
| 2nd place, silver medalist(s) | (United States) Britton Wilson | Arkansas | 49.64 | |
| 3rd place, bronze medalist(s) | (Jamaica) Nickisha Pryce | Arkansas | 50.23 | |
| 4 | (United States) Rosey Effiong | Arkansas | 50.77 | |
| 5 | (United States) Talitha Diggs | Florida | 50.93 | |
| 6 | (United States) Ziyah Holman | Michigan | 51.04 | |
| 7 | (United States) Jermaisha Arnold | Texas A&M | 51.05 | |
| 8 | (United States) Tierra Robinson-Jones | Texas A&M | 51.12 | |
| 9 | (United States) Jan'Taijah Jones | USC | 51.15 | |

==== 800 meters ====
| Rank | Athlete | Team | Time | Notes |
|---|---|---|---|---|
| 1st place, gold medalist(s) | (United States) Michaela Rose | LSU | 1:59.83 | |
| 2nd place, silver medalist(s) | (Lithuania) Gabija Galvydyte | Oklahoma State | 2:00.47 | |
| 3rd place, bronze medalist(s) | (United States) Claire Seymour | BYU | 2:00.55 | |
| 4 | (United States) Roisin Willis | Stanford | 2:00.91 | |
| 5 | (Kenya) Dorcus Ewoi | Campbell | 2:02.13 | |
| 6 | (United States) Valery Tobias | Texas | 2:02.39 | |
| 7 | (Canada) Aurora Rynda | Michigan | 2:03.15 | |
| 8 | (United States) Meghan Hunter | BYU | 2:04.05 | |
| 9 | (United States) Katherine Mitchell | Boston College | 2:05.66 | |

==== 1500 meters ====
| Rank | Athlete | Team | Time | Notes |
|---|---|---|---|---|
| 1st place, gold medalist(s) | (New Zealand) Maia Ramsden | Harvard | 4:08.60 | |
| 2nd place, silver medalist(s) | (Australia) Izzy Thornton-Bott | Oregon | 4:09.21 | |
| 3rd place, bronze medalist(s) | (United States) Margot Appleton | Virginia | 4:09.30 | |
| 4 | (Poland) Klaudia Kazimierska | Oregon | 4:09.84 | |
| 5 | (Kenya) Billah Jepkirui | Oklahoma State | 4:10.17 | |
| 6 | (United Kingdom) Shannon Flockhart | Providence | 4:10.78 | |
| 7 | (United States) Katelyn Tuohy | NC State | 4:11.40 | |
| 8 | (United States) Olivia Howell | Illinois | 4:11.54 | |
| 9 | (United States) Abbe Goldstein | New Mexico | 4:11.86 | |
| 10 | (United States) Maddy Elmore | Oregon | 4:12.70 | |
| 11 | (United States) Melissa Riggins | Georgetown | 4:16.57 | |
| 12 | (Republic of Ireland) Sophie O'Sullivan | Washington | 4:22.81 | |

==== 5000 meters ====
| Rank | Athlete | Team | Time | Notes |
|---|---|---|---|---|
| 1st place, gold medalist(s) | (United States) Parker Valby | Florida | 15:30.57 | |
| 2nd place, silver medalist(s) | (Kenya) Everlyn Kemboi | Utah Valley | 15:39.57 | |
| 3rd place, bronze medalist(s) | (United States) Emily Venters | Utah | 15:42.40 | |
| 4 | (United States) Amaris Tyynismaa | NC State | 15:44.82 | |
| 5 | (Netherlands) Anima Maatoug | Duke | 15:48.22 | |
| 6 | (United States) Cailie Logue | Iowa State | 15:49.85 | |
| 7 | (Canada) Simone Plourde | Utah | 15:50.10 | |
| 8 | (United States) Chloe Scrimgeour | Georgetown | 15:52.37 | |
| 9 | (Australia) Amelia Mazza-Downie | New Mexico | 15:56.35 | |
| 10 | (Canada) Siona Chisholm | Notre Dame | 15:58.17 | |
| 11 | (United States) Alyson Churchill | Florida State | 16:02.40 | |
| 12 | (United States) Sydney Thorvaldson | Arkansas | 16:03.61 | |
| 13 | (Republic of Ireland) Jane Buckley | Providence | 16:06.76 | |
| 14 | (United States) Lucy Jenks | Stanford | 16:08.16 | |
| 15 | (Canada) Gracelyn Larkin | New Mexico | 16:08.33 | |
| 16 | (United States) Kelsey Chmiel | NC State | 16:08.97 | |
| 17 | (United States) Faith Demars | Penn State | 16:09.61 | |
| 18 | (New Zealand) Maia Ramsden | Harvard | 16:12.95 | |
| 19 | (United States) Lydia Miller | Lipsomcb | 16:14.55 | |
| 20 | (Bulgaria) Yasna Petrova | California Baptist | 16:16.09 | |
| 21 | (United States) Brianna Weidler | UC Davis | 16:21.70 | |
| 22 | (United States) Ella Baran | Colorado | 16:22.52 | |
| 23 | (United States) Sarah Carter | Colorado State | 17:01.30 | |
| 24 | (United States) Katelyn Tuohy | NC State | DNS | |

==== 10000 meters ====
| Rank | Athlete | Team | Time | Notes |
|---|---|---|---|---|
| 1st place, gold medalist(s) | (Kenya) Everlyn Kemboi | Utah Valley | 32:39.08 | |
| 2nd place, silver medalist(s) | (United States) Emily Venters | Utah | 32:47.7 | |
| 3rd place, bronze medalist(s) | (Kenya) Mercy Chelangat | Alabama | 32:49.62 | |
| 4 | (Australia) Amelia Mazza-Downie | New Mexico | 32:51.90 | |
| 5 | (Kenya) Hilda Olemomoi | Alabama | 32:58.81 | |
| 6 | (United States) Cailie Logue | Iowa State | 33:06.86 | |
| 7 | (United States) Amanda Vestri | Syracuse | 33:11.69 | |
| 8 | (United States) Kelsey Chmiel | NC State | 33:14.09 | |
| 9 | (United States) Annamaria Kostarellis | Baylor | 33:21.34 | |
| 10 | (United States) Aubrey Frentheway | BYU | 33:45.29 | |
| 11 | (United States) Ava Nuttall | Miami (OH) | 33:51.78 | |
| 12 | (United States) Alexandra Hays | NC State | 33:54.09 | |
| 13 | (United States) Molly Born | Oklahoma State | 33:54.16 | |
| 14 | (Canada) Gracelyn Larkin | New Mexico | 34:00.22 | |
| 15 | (United States) Camila Noe | Montana State | 34:06.64 | |
| 16 | (United States) Daisy Liljegren | Boston University | 34:13.36 | |
| 17 | (United States) Kenzie Doyle | UMass Lowell | 34:41.76 | |
| 18 | (United States) Sophie Atkinson | Virginia | 34:51.58 | |
| 19 | (United States) Eleanor Mancini | La Salle | 35:19.21 | |
| 20 | (United States) Mariah Howlett | New Mexico | 35:19.62 | |
| 21 | (United States) Monica Hebner | Texas | 35:39.23 | |
| 22 | (United States) India Johnson | Colorado | DNF | |
| 23 | (United States) Erin Strzelecki | Notre Dame | DNF | |
| 24 | (United States) Annabel Stafford | Colorado State | DNS | |

==== 100-meter hurdles ====
Wind: -0.0 m/s

| Rank | Athlete | Team | Time | Notes |
|---|---|---|---|---|
| 1st place, gold medalist(s) | (Jamaica) Ackera Nugent | Arkansas | 12.25 | |
| 2nd place, silver medalist(s) | (United States) Masai Russell | Kentucky | 12.32 | |
| 3rd place, bronze medalist(s) | (United States) Alia Armstrong | LSU | 12.49 | |
| 4 | (United States) Talie Bonds | Arizona | 12.71 | |
| 5 | (United States) Grace Stark | Florida | 12.72 | |
| 6 | (United States) Alexis Glasco | Coastal Carolina | 12.74 | |
| 7 | (United States) Aasia Laurencin | Michigan | 12.82 | |
| 8 | (United States) Paula Salmon | North Carolina A&T | 12.92 | |
| 9 | (United States) Rayniah Jones | UCF | 13.00 | |

==== 400-meter hurdles ====
| Rank | Athlete | Team | Time | Notes |
|---|---|---|---|---|
| 1st place, gold medalist(s) | (Canada) Savannah Sutherland | Michigan | 54.45 | |
| 2nd place, silver medalist(s) | (United States) Masai Russell | Kentucky | 54.66 | |
| 3rd place, bronze medalist(s) | (United States) Chastity Pickett | Campbell | 54.86 | |
| 4 | (Canada) Brooke Overholt | Vanderbilt | 55.50 | |
| 5 | (United States) Shani'a Bellamy | LSU | 55.58 | |
| 6 | (Jamaica) Lashanna Graham | Clemson | 55.59 | |
| 7 | (United States) Britton Wilson | Arkansas | 55.92 | |
| 8 | (United States) Abbey Glynn | Colorado | 56.01 | |
| 9 | (United States) Sydni Townsend | Houston | 56.27 | |

==== 3000-meter steeplechase ====
Semifinal 1
| Rank | Athlete | Team | Time | Notes |
|---|---|---|---|---|
| 1 | (United States) Kaylee Mitchell | Oregon State | 9:51.46 | Q |
| 2 | (United Kingdom) Elise Thorner | New Mexico | 9:51.56 | Q |
| 3 | (Canada) Grace Fetherstonhaugh | Oregon State | 9:52.02 | Q |
| 4 | (United States) Angelina Ellis | Butler | 9:52.13 | Q |
| 5 | (United Kingdom) Maisie Grice | New Mexico | 9:52.14 | Q |
| 6 | (United States) Calli Doan | Liberty | 9:52.15 | q, PB |
| 7 | (Kenya) Lona Latema | Kansas | 9:58.30 | |
| 8 | (United States) Olivia Morganti | Pennsylvania | 10:05.04 | |
| 9 | (United States) Victoria Patterson | Columbia | 10:05.68 | |
| 10 | (United States) Katie Thronson | Notre Dame | 10:05.04 | |
| 11 | (United States) Lydia Olivere | Villanova | 10:18.93 | |
| 12 | (United States) Emily Cole | Duke | 10:25.42 | |

Semifinal 2
| Rank | Athlete | Team | Time | Notes |
|---|---|---|---|---|
| 1 | (United States) Olivia Markezich | Notre Dame | 9:40.81 | Q |
| 2 | (Lithuania) Greta Karinauskaitė | CBU | 9:40.87 | Q |
| 3 | (United States) Lexy Halladay-Lowry | BYU | 9:42.35 | Q, PB |
| 4 | (Canada) Ceili McCabe | West Virginia | 9:48.53 | Q |
| 5 | (United States) Kayley Delay | Washington | 9:50.08 | Q |
| 6 | (Germany) Pauline Meyer | Arkansas State | 9:51.86 | q |
| 7 | (United States) Katelyn Mitchem | Wyoming | 9:56.18 | |
| 8 | (United States) Emma Tavella | UCLA | 9:56.93 | |
| 9 | (United States) Janette Schraft | Iowa State | 10:05.58 | |
| 10 | (Spain) Carmen Riaño | Miami (OH) | 10:17.01 | |
| 11 | (United States) Aziza Chigatayeva | Binghamton | 10:22.86 | |
| 12 | (Netherlands) Kristel van den Berg | Ole Miss | 10:31.22 | |

Final
| Rank | Athlete | Team | Time | Notes |
|---|---|---|---|---|
| 1st place, gold medalist(s) | (United States) Olivia Markezich | Notre Dame | 9:25.03 | PB |
| 2nd place, silver medalist(s) | (Lithuania) Greta Karinauskaitė | CBU | 9:30:85 | |
| 3rd place, bronze medalist(s) | (Canada) Ceili McCabe | West Virginia | 9:41.32 | SB |
| 4 | (United States) Lexy Halladay-Lowry | BYU | 9:41.85 | PB |
| 5 | (United Kingdom) Elise Thorner | New Mexico | 9:42.25 | |
| 6 | (Canada) Grace Fetherstonhaugh | Oregon State | 9:49.48 | |
| 7 | (United States) Kaylee Mitchell | Oregon State | 9:49.66 | |
| 8 | (Germany) Pauline Meyer | Arkansas State | 9:50.75 | |
| 9 | (United States) Angelina Ellis | Butler | 9:55.53 | |
| 10 | (United States) Kayley Delay | Washington | 9:56.63 | |
| 11 | (United States) Calli Doan | Liberty | 9:56.83 | |
| 12 | (United Kingdom) Maisie Grice | New Mexico | 10:11.62 | |

==== 4 × 100-meter relay ====
| Rank | Team | Time | Notes |
|---|---|---|---|
| 1st place, gold medalist(s) | Texas | 41.60 | |
| 2nd place, silver medalist(s) | Kentucky | 42.46 | |
| 3rd place, bronze medalist(s) | LSU | 42.52 | |
| 4 | Arkansas | 42.83 | |
| 5 | Ohio State | 42.85 | |
| 6 | Georgia | 42.87 | |
| 7 | Oregon | 43.06 | |
| 8 | Baylor | 43.12 | |
| 9 | USC | 43.13 | |

==== 4 × 400-meter relay ====
Heat 1
| Rank | Team | Time | Notes |
|---|---|---|---|
| 1 | Duke | 3:28.84 | Q |
| 2 | Kentucky | 3:29.95 | Q |
| 3 | Florida | 3:30.37 | |
| 4 | Pennsylvania | 3:33.43 | SB |
| 5 | Tennessee | 3:33.52 | |
| 6 | Nevada | 3:35.40 | |
| 7 | Iowa | 3:37.08 | |
| - | Texas | DQ | R15.5-3c |

Heat 2
| Rank | Team | Time | Notes |
|---|---|---|---|
| 1 | Arkansas | 3:25.91 | Q |
| 2 | Texas A&M | 3:27.05 | Q |
| 3 | Oregon | 3:28.85 | q |
| 4 | Ohio State | 3:29.01 | q |
| 5 | Miami (FL) | 3:29.94 | |
| 6 | Michigan | 3:30.68 | |
| 7 | BYU | 3:39.56 | |
| - | Howard | DQ | R15.5-2b |

Heat 3
| Rank | Team | Time | Notes |
|---|---|---|---|
| 1 | USC | 3:27.88 | Q |
| 2 | Baylor | 3:28.76 | Q, SB |
| 3 | Georgia | 3:29.90 | q, SB |
| 4 | UCLA | 3:30.55 | SB |
| 5 | Stanford | 3:30.98 | |
| 6 | LSU | 3:32.17 | |
| 7 | Colorado | 3:36.37 | |
| 8 | Purdue | 3:36.80 | |

Final
| Rank | Team | Time | Notes |
|---|---|---|---|
| 1st place, gold medalist(s) | Arkansas | 3:24.05 | SB |
| 2nd place, silver medalist(s) | Texas A&M | 3:26.12 | |
| 3rd place, bronze medalist(s) | Ohio State | 3:26.72 | |
| 4 | USC | 3:27.42 | |
| 5 | Baylor | 3:27.45 | SB |
| 6 | Kentucky | 3:27.47 | SB |
| 7 | Oregon | 3:27.77 | SB |
| 8 | Duke | 3:28.65 | |
| 9 | Georgia | 3:30.55 | |

==== Long jump ====
| Rank | Athlete | Team | 1 | 2 | 3 | 4 | 5 | 6 | Mark | Wind (m/s) | Notes |
|---|---|---|---|---|---|---|---|---|---|---|---|
| 1st place, gold medalist(s) | (Jamaica) Ackelia Smith | Texas | X | X | 6.35 | 6.68 | 6.81 | 6.88 | 6.88 m (22 ft 6 3/4 in) | -0.2 | |
| 2nd place, silver medalist(s) | (United States) Alyssa Jones | Stanford | 6.31 | 5.42 | 6.67 | 6.86 | 6.39 | X | 6.86 m (22 ft 6 in) | +0.1 | PB |
| 3rd place, bronze medalist(s) | (United States) Jasmine Moore | Florida | 6.24 | 6.46 | 6.54 | 6.63 | 6.46 | 6.66 | 6.66 m (21 ft 10 in) | +0.3 | |
| 4 | (United States) Alysah Hickey | Oregon | 6.00 | 6.37 | 6.14 | 6.18 | 6.40 | 6.48 | 6.48 m (21 ft 3 in) | +0.3 | |
| 5 | (United States) Claire Bryant | Florida | 6.37 | X | 6.44 | 6.35 | 6.43 | X | 6.44 m (21 ft 1 1/2 in) | -1.1 | |
| 6 | (The Bahamas) Charisma Taylor | Tennessee | X | X | 6.32 | 6.37 | 6.20 | 6.41 | 6.41 m (21 ft 1/4 in) | +0.4 | |
| 7 | (Sweden) Emilia Sjöstrand | San Jose State | 6.07 | 6.18 | 6.31 | 4.41 | 6.14 | 6.09 | 6.31 m (20 ft 8 1/4 in) | -0.6 | |
| 8 | (United States) Synclair Savage | Louisville | 6.08 | 6.17 | 6.30 | 6.20 | 6.12 | X | 6.30 m (20 ft 8 in) | -0.2 | |
| 9 | (Grenada) Jonair Thomas | Texas A&M | 6.27 | X | 5.93 | - | - | - | 6.27 m (20 ft 6 3/4 in) | -0.9 | |
| 10 | (Jamaica) Velecia Williams | Nebraska | X | X | 6.15 | | | | 6.15 m (20 ft 2 in) | -0.9 | |
| 11 | (United States) Titiana Marsh | Georgia | 6.12 | 5.89 | 5.90 | | | | 6.12 m (20 ft 3/4 in) | -0.8 | |
| 12 | (United States) Morgan Smalls | LSU | 6.09 | 5.95 | X | | | | 6.09 m (19 ft 11 3/4 in) | +0.1 | |
| 13 | (United Kingdom) Isabel Wakefield | Duke | 6.05 | 5.88 | 6.07 | | | | 6.07 m (19 ft 10 3/4 in) | -0.7 | |
| 14 | (United States) Raelyn Roberson | SMU | 6.04 | 5.60 | 5.66 | | | | 6.04 m (19 ft 9 3/4 in) | -0.1 | |
| 15 | (Puerto Rico) Paola Fernandez | Indiana | 5.99 | 6.02 | 5.80 | | | | 6.02 m (19 ft 9 in) | -0.3 | |
| 16 | (United States) Sydney Willits | Iowa State | 6.01 | 5.79 | 5.54 | | | | 6.01 m (19 ft 8 1/2 in) | -0.8 | |
| 17 | (United States) Caelyn Harris | Alabama | 5.96 | X | 6.00 | | | | 6.00 m (19 ft 8 in) | -0.7 | |
| 18 | (Canada) Jasmine Scott-Kilgo | UCF | X | 5.94 | 5.95 | | | | 5.95 m (19 ft 6 1/4 in) | -0.5 | |
| 19 | (United States) Jirah Sidberry | NC State | 5.95 | X | 5.50 | | | | 5.95 m (19 ft 6 1/4 in) | -1.0 | |
| 20 | (United States) Eve Divinity | San Jose State | 5.93 | 5.38 | 5.71 | | | | 5.93 m (19 ft 5 1/4 in) | -0.1 | |
| 21 | (United States) Asia Poe | Mississippi State | 5.57 | 5.81 | 5.88 | | | | 5.88 m (19 ft 3 1/4 in) | -0.4 | |
| 22 | (United States) Symone Washington | Oklahoma | 5.75 | 5.87 | 5.81 | | | | 5.87 m (19 ft 3 in) | -0.9 | |
| 23 | (United Kingdom) Ore Adamson | UTSA | X | 5.87 | 5.71 | | | | 5.87 m (19 ft 3 in) | -1.1 | |
| 24 | (United States) Ijeoma Uche | California | 5.65 | 5.71 | 5.47 | | | | 5.71 m (18 ft 8 3/4 in) | +0.0 | |

==== Triple jump ====
| Rank | Athlete | Team | 1 | 2 | 3 | 4 | 5 | 6 | Mark | Wind (m/s) | Notes |
|---|---|---|---|---|---|---|---|---|---|---|---|
| 1st place, gold medalist(s) | (United States) Jasmine Moore | Florida | 14.37 | 14.78 | 14.37 | 14.27 | 12.56 | 14.02 | 14.78 m (48 ft 5 3/4 in) | +1.3 | FR, MR, CR |
| 2nd place, silver medalist(s) | (Jamaica) Ackelia Smith | Texas | 14.23 | 14.25 | 14.54 | 14.20 | 14.30 | 14.37 | 14.54 m (47 ft 8 1/4 in) | +1.9 | PB |
| 3rd place, bronze medalist(s) | (Latvia) Ruta Lasmane | Texas Tech | 13.81 | 13.67 | 14.21 | 14.20 | 14.02 | X | 14.21 m (46 ft 7 1/4 in) | +2.6 | SB |
| 4 | (The Bahamas) Charisma Taylor | Tennessee | 13.93 | X | 13.73 | 13.40 | 13.46 | 13.76 | 13.93 m (45 ft 8 1/4 in) | +1.7 | |
| 5 | (United States) Titiana Marsh | Georgia | 13.45 | 13.42 | 13.67 | 13.27 | 12.93 | 13.19 | 13.67 m (44 ft 10 in) | +2.3 | SB |
| 6 | (United Kingdom) Temi Ojora | USC | 13.66 | X | X | 13.02 | 13.59 | 12.96 | 13.66 m (44 ft 9 3/4 in) | +1.2 | |
| 7 | (France) Anne-Suzanna Fosther-Katta | Texas Tech | 11.59 | 13.57 | 13.66 | 13.53 | X | X | 13.66 m (44 ft 9 3/4 in) | +2.2 | SB |
| 8 | (Saint Vincent and the Grenadines) Mikeisha Welcome | Georgia | 13.20 | 13.62 | X | 13.36 | 13.39 | 13.03 | 13.62 m (44 ft 8 in) | +2.2 | |
| 9 | (United States) Jaime Robinson | Ohio State | 12.87 | 13.38 | 13.50 | X | X | 13.48 | 13.50 m (44 ft 3 1/4 in) | +2.2 | SB |
| 10 | (United States) Asherah Collins | UCF | 13.20 | 13.25 | 13.48 | | | | 13.48 m (44 ft 2 1/2 in) | +1.9 | PB |
| 11 | (United States) Simone Johnson | San Diego State | 13.42 | X | 13.28 | | | | 13.42 m (44 ft 1/4 in) | +2.0 | |
| 12 | (United States) Euphenie Andre | Missouri | 13.39 | 13.01 | 13.15 | | | | 13.39 m (43 ft 11 in) | +0.9 | PB |
| 13 | (Jamaica) Rhianna Phipps | Nebraska | 12.63 | X | 13.35 | | | | 13.35 m (43 ft 9 1/2 in) | +2.2 | |
| 14 | (Sweden) Emilia Sjöstrand | San Jose State | 13.28 | X | 13.30 | | | | 13.30 m (43 ft 7 1/2 in) | +2.6 | |
| 15 | (United States) Cierra Pyles | Virginia Tech | 13.24 | X | 13.18 | | | | 13.24 m (43 ft 5 1/4 in) | +3.1 | |
| 16 | (Nigeria) Onaara Obamuwagun | Texas Tech | 13.10 | X | 11.78 | | | | 13.10 m (42 ft 11 1/2 in) | +2.3 | |
| 17 | (United States) Koi Johnson | Baylor | 13.08 | 12.80 | 12.65 | | | | 13.08 m (42 ft 10 3/4 in) | +2.4 | |
| 18 | (United States) Asha Fletcher | California | 12.72 | 12.95 | 13.06 | | | | 13.06 m (42 ft 10 in) | +1.6 | |
| 19 | (United States) Ryann Porter | Indiana State | X | X | 13.03 | | | | 13.03 m (42 ft 8 3/4 in) | +1.5 | |
| 20 | (United States) Jafa Branch | Appalachian State | 12.97 | 12.93 | 12.93 | | | | 12.97 m (42 ft 6 1/2 in) | +1.0 | |
| 21 | (United States) Ashley Moore | Miami (FL) | 12.66 | 12.51 | X | | | | 12.66 m (41 ft 6 1/4 in) | +2.1 | |
| 22 | (United States) Christina Warren | Arizona State | 12.50 | 12.46 | 12.52 | | | | 12.52 m (41 ft 3/4 in) | +2.6 | |
| 23 | (United States) Marquasha Myers | Miami (FL) | X | 12.24 | X | | | | 12.24 m (40 ft 1 3/4 in) | +1.9 | |
| | (France) Eunice Ilunga Mbuyi | ULM | X | X | X | | | | NM | | |

==== High jump ====
| Rank | Athlete | Team | 1.73 | 1.78 | 1.81 | 1.84 | 1.87 | 1.90 | 1.93 | 1.97 | Mark | Notes |
|---|---|---|---|---|---|---|---|---|---|---|---|---|
| 1st place, gold medalist(s) | (United States) Charity Griffith | Ball State | - | o | o | o | xo | xo | o | xxx | 1.93 m (6 ft 3 3/4 in) | PB |
| 2nd place, silver medalist(s) | (Jamaica) Lamara Distin | Texas A&M | - | - | o | o | o | xxx | | | 1.87 m (6 ft 1 1/2 in) | |
| 3rd place, bronze medalist(s) | (Cyprus) Elene Kulichenko | Georgia | - | - | o | o | xo | xx- | x | | 1.87 m (6 ft 1 1/2 in) | |
| 4 | (Estonia) Lilian Turban | Hawai'i | o | o | o | xo | xxo | xxx | | | 1.87 m (6 ft 1 1/2 in) | PB |
| 5 | (United States) Sanaa Barnes | Auburn | o | o | o | o | xx | r | | | 1.84 m (6 ft 1/4 in) | SB |
| 5 | (Mexico) Claudina Diaz | Missouri | o | o | o | o | xxx | | | | 1.84 m (6 ft 1/4 in) | |
| 7 | (United States) Cierra Tidwell | BYU | o | xo | xo | o | xxx | | | | 1.84 m (6 ft 1/4 in) | |
| 8 | (United States) Taylor Beard | Cincinnati | o | o | xo | xo | xxx | | | | 1.84 m (6 ft 1/4 in) | =PB |
| 9 | (United States) Grace Campbell | Arizona State | o | o | o | xxo | xxx | | | | 1.84 m (6 ft 1/4 in) | =PB |
| 9 | (South Africa) Kristi Snyman | Jacksonville | o | o | o | xxo | xxx | | | | 1.84 m (6 ft 1/4 in) | PB |
| 11 | (United States) Chinenye Agina | Duke | xxo | o | o | xxo | xxx | | | | 1.84 m (6 ft 1/4 in) | SB |
| 12 | (United States) Rylee Anderson | Kansas | - | o | o | xxx | | | | | 1.81 m (5 ft 11 1/4 in) | |
| 13 | (United States) Jenna Rogers | Nebraska | - | o | xo | xxx | | | | | 1.81 m (5 ft 11 1/4 in) | |
| 14 | (Jamaica) Daniella Anglin | South Dakota | o | xo | xo | xxx | | | | | 1.81 m (5 ft 11 1/4 in) | |
| 14 | (Jamaica) Roschell Clayton | Villanova | o | xo | xo | xxx | | | | | 1.81 m (5 ft 11 1/4 in) | |
| 16 | (United States) Destiny Masters | Wichita State | o | o | xxo | xxx | | | | | 1.81 m (5 ft 11 1/4 in) | |
| 16 | (United States) Nissi Kabongo | Stephen F. Austin | o | o | xxo | xxx | | | | | 1.81 m (5 ft 11 1/4 in) | |
| 18 | (United States) Madison Yerigan | Nebraska | o | xo | xxo | xxx | | | | | 1.81 m (5 ft 11 1/4 in) | |
| 18 | (United States) Madison Schmidt | Notre Dame | o | xo | xxo | xxx | | | | | 1.81 m (5 ft 11 1/4 in) | PB |
| 20 | (Canada) Alexa Porpaczy | Arizona | o | o | xxx | | | | | | 1.78 m (5 ft 10 in) | |
| 21 | (United States) Annika Kinley | Cincinnati | xo | o | xxx | | | | | | 1.78 m (5 ft 10 in) | |
| 22 | (United States) Morgan Smalls | LSU | xo | xo | xxx | | | | | | 1.78 m (5 ft 10 in) | |
| 23 | (United States) Claire Bryant | Florida | o | xxo | xxx | | | | | | 1.78 m (5 ft 10 in) | |
| 24 | (United States) Meghan Fletcher | Murray State | xo | xxx | | | | | | | 1.73 m (5 ft 8 in) | |

==== Pole vault ====
| Rank | Athlete | Team | 4.00 | 4.15 | 4.30 | 4.40 | 4.45 | Mark | Notes |
|---|---|---|---|---|---|---|---|---|---|
| 1st place, gold medalist(s) | (United States) Julia Fixsen | Virginia Tech | - | o | o | o | o | 4.45 m (14 ft 7 in) | =PB |
| 2nd place, silver medalist(s) | (United States) Nastassja Campbell | Washington | - | xxo | xo | o | x | 4.45 m (14 ft 7 in) | |
| 3rd place, bronze medalist(s) | (United States) Gennifer Hirata | South Dakota | o | xxo | xxo | xo | | 4.40 m (14 ft 5 in) | |
| 4 | (United States) Sevanna Hanson | Arizona State | o | o | o | xxx | | 4.30 m (14 ft 1 1/4 in) | PB |
| 5 | (United States) Sydney Horn | High Point | o | xo | o | x- | x | 4.30 m (14 ft 1 1/4 in) | |
| 6 | (Estonia) Marleen Mülla | South Dakota | o | xxo | xo | xxx | | 4.30 m (14 ft 1 1/4 in) | |
| 6 | (United States) Sara Borton | Washington | xo | xo | xo | xxx | | 4.30 m (14 ft 1 1/4 in) | |
| 8 | (United States) Kenna Stimmel | Virginia Tech | o | o | xxo | xxx | | 4.30 m (14 ft 1 1/4 in) | |
| 9 | (United States) Rachel Vesper | High Point | o | o | xxx | | | 4.15 m (13 ft 7 1/4 in) | |
| 9 | (United States) Olivia Lueking | Oklahoma | - | o | xxx | | | 4.15 m (13 ft 7 1/4 in) | |
| 9 | (United States) Amari Turner | California | o | o | xxx | | | 4.15 m (13 ft 7 1/4 in) | |
| 12 | (United States) Aliyah Welter | Louisville | xo | o | xxx | | | 4.15 m (13 ft 7 1/4 in) | |
| 13 | (United States) Mackenzie Hayward | Arkansas | o | xo | xxx | | | 4.15 m (13 ft 7 1/4 in) | |
| 13 | (United States) Journey Gurley | Virginia Tech | o | xo | xxx | | | 4.15 m (13 ft 7 1/4 in) | |
| 15 | (United States) Hayley Horvath | Virginia Tech | xxo | xo | xxx | | | 4.15 m (13 ft 7 1/4 in) | |
| 16 | (United States) Tori Thomas | Illinois | o | xxx | | | | 4.00 m (13 ft 1 1/4 in) | |
| 16 | (United States) Riley Felts | UNC-Charlotte | o | xxx | | | | 4.00 m (13 ft 1 1/4 in) | |
| 16 | (United States) Kaitlyn Banas | Arkansas | o | xxx | | | | 4.00 m (13 ft 1 1/4 in) | |
| 19 | (United States) Erin Bogard | Youngstown State | xo | xxx | | | | 4.00 m (13 ft 1 1/4 in) | |
| 19 | (Sweden) Filippa Miller | FIU | xo | xxx | | | | 4.00 m (13 ft 1 1/4 in) | |
| | (United States) Amanda Fassold | Arkansas | xxx | | | | | NH | |
| | (United States) Chloe Timberg | Rutgers | - | xxx | | | | NH | |
| | (United States) Cassidy Mooneyhan | South Dakota | xxx | | | | | NH | |

==== Shot put ====
| Rank | Athlete | Team | 1 | 2 | 3 | 4 | 5 | 6 | Mark | Notes |
|---|---|---|---|---|---|---|---|---|---|---|
| 1st place, gold medalist(s) | (Sweden) Axelina Johansson | Nebraska | 18.93 | 19.08 | 18.96 | 18.94 | 18.99 | 19.28 | 19.28 m (63 ft 3 in) | FR |
| 2nd place, silver medalist(s) | (Netherlands) Jorinde van Klinken | Oregon | 17.88 | 18.13 | 17.71 | X | 17.85 | 18.48 | 18.48 m (60 ft 7 1/2 in) | |
| 3rd place, bronze medalist(s) | (Dominican Republic) Rosa Santana | UNLV | 16.63 | 18.03 | 18.37 | 17.53 | 18.35 | 17.53 | 18.37 m (60 ft 3 in) | |
| 4 | (Netherlands) Alida van Daalen | Florida | 17.18 | 17.59 | 18.20 | X | X | X | 18.20 m (59 ft 8 1/2 in) | PB |
| 5 | (United States) Jaida Ross | Oregon | 17.23 | 18.11 | X | 17.27 | 18.07 | 17.88 | 18.11 m (59 ft 4 3/4 in) | |
| 6 | (United States) Mallory Kauffman | Penn State | X | 17.44 | 17.54 | 16.67 | 18.00 | X | 18.00 m (59 ft 1/2 in) | PB |
| 7 | (United States) Josie Schaefer | Wisconsin | 16.71 | 17.58 | 17.95 | 17.63 | 17.38 | X | 17.95 m (58 ft 10 1/2 in) | |
| 8 | (United States) Hannah Hall | Miami (FL) | 17.45 | 17.44 | 17.82 | 17.36 | 17.94 | 17.80 | 17.94 m (58 ft 10 1/4 in) | |
| 9 | (United States) Veronica Fraley | Vanderbilt | 16.75 | X | 17.80 | 17.82 | 17.55 | 17.84 | 17.84 m (58 ft 6 1/4 in) | PB |
| 10 | (United States) KeAyla Dove | North Texas | 17.30 | X | 17.54 | | | | 17.54 m (57 ft 6 1/2 in) | |
| 11 | (Iceland) Erna Gunnarsdóttir | Rice | 16.83 | 16.91 | 17.24 | | | | 17.24 m (56 ft 6 1/2 in) | |
| 12 | (United States) Gabby McDonald | Colorado State | X | 16.56 | 17.24 | | | | 17.24 m (56 ft 6 1/2 in) | PB |
| 13 | (United States) Chelsea Igberaese | Alabama | 16.51 | 16.00 | 17.11 | | | | 17.11 m (56 ft 1 1/2 in) | |
| 14 | (Brazil) Ana da Silva | Georgia | 16.21 | 17.06 | 17.02 | | | | 17.06 m (55 ft 11 1/2 in) | |
| 15 | (United States) Marilyn Nwora | Texas | 16.94 | 16.75 | 16.95 | | | | 16.95 m (55 ft 7 1/4 in) | |
| 16 | (United Kingdom) Sarah Omoregie | Harvard | 16.90 | 16.65 | 16.50 | | | | 16.90 m (55 ft 5 1/4 in) | |
| 17 | (United States) Mya Lesnar | Colorado State | 16.25 | 16.72 | X | | | | 16.72 m (54 ft 10 1/4 in) | |
| 18 | (United States) Jayden Ulrich | Indiana | 16.02 | X | 16.68 | | | | 16.68 m (54 ft 8 1/2 in) | |
| 19 | (Trinidad and Tobago) Cherisse Murray | Alabama | 16.12 | 16.56 | 15.75 | | | | 16.56 m (54 ft 3 3/4 in) | |
| 20 | (United States) Taylor Latimer | Nebraska | 16.43 | X | 16.19 | | | | 16.43 m (53 ft 10 3/4 in) | |
| 21 | (United States) Jasmine Mitchell | Ole Miss | 15.63 | X | 16.43 | | | | 16.43 m (53 ft 10 3/4 in) | |
| 22 | (United States) Essence Henderson | Virginia Tech | X | X | 15.50 | | | | 15.50 m (50 ft 10 in) | |
| | (United States) Myejoi Williams | Illinois State | X | X | X | | | | NM | |
| | (United States) Opal Jackson | Michigan State | X | X | X | | | | NM | |

==== Discus throw ====
| Rank | Athlete | Team | 1 | 2 | 3 | 4 | 5 | 6 | Mark | Notes |
|---|---|---|---|---|---|---|---|---|---|---|
| 1st place, gold medalist(s) | (Netherlands) Jorinde van Klinken | Oregon | 61.41 | 65.20 | 65.55 | 63.97 | 64.06 | 65.34 | 65.55 m (215 ft 1/2 in) | MR |
| 2nd place, silver medalist(s) | (Nigeria) Ashley Anumba | Virginia | 56.42 | 56.47 | 54.91 | 61.13 | X | 49.74 | 61.13 m (200 ft 6 1/2 in) | PB |
| 3rd place, bronze medalist(s) | (Netherlands) Alida van Daalen | Florida | 56.92 | 56.03 | 59.96 | 57.06 | 58.84 | 52.92 | 59.96 m (196 ft 8 1/2 in) | PB |
| 4 | (Sweden) Caisa-Marie Lindfors | Florida State | 59.32 | 58.08 | 59.32 | X | 57.07 | X | 59.32 m (194 ft 7 1/4 in) | |
| 5 | (Australia) Samantha Lenton | Memphis | 56.11 | X | 56.75 | 55.78 | 58.59 | 58.95 | 58.95 m (193 ft 4 3/4 in) | PB |
| 6 | (Israel) Estel Valeanu | Harvard | 54.18 | X | 58.25 | 56.30 | 55.92 | X | 58.25 m (191 ft 1 1/4 in) | PB |
| 7 | (United States) Gabby McDonald | Colorado State | 56.93 | 55.61 | 57.76 | 56.30 | 56.51 | 54.07 | 57.76 m (189 ft 6 in) | |
| 8 | (United States) Jade Whitfield | Oregon State | X | 56.31 | 57.63 | X | 53.50 | 56.10 | 57.63 m (189 ft 3/4 in) | |
| 9 | (United States) Essence Henderson | Virginia Tech | X | 56.28 | 55.05 | X | X | X | 56.28 m (184 ft 7 1/2 in) | SB |
| 10 | (United States) Michaëlle Valentin | FIU | 51.95 | X | 56.12 | | | | 56.12 m (184 ft 1 1/4 in) | PB |
| 11 | (Australia) Lyvante Su'emai | UCLA | 50.27 | 52.05 | 55.69 | | | | 55.69 m (182 ft 8 1/2 in) | PB |
| 12 | (United States) Josie Schaefer | Wisconsin | 54.96 | 53.48 | 51.97 | | | | 54.96 m (180 ft 3 3/4 in) | |
| 13 | (United States) Faith Bender | Ohio State | 54.11 | 53.05 | 53.68 | | | | 54.11 m (177 ft 6 1/4 in) | |
| 14 | (United States) Chrystal Herpin | Texas | 48.80 | 52.88 | 53.57 | | | | 53.57 m (175 ft 9 in) | |
| 15 | (United States) Zaresha Neal | Bowling Green | 52.51 | 53.23 | 53.08 | | | | 53.23 m (174 ft 7 1/2 in) | |
| 16 | (United States) Kaia Harris | Missouri | 47.20 | 52.22 | 52.93 | | | | 52.93 m (173 ft 7 3/4 in) | |
| 17 | (United States) Veronica Fraley | Vanderbilt | 52.91 | X | X | | | | 52.91 m (173 ft 7 in) | |
| 18 | (United States) Jordyn Bryant | Fresno State | 45.98 | 52.25 | 47.01 | | | | 52.25 m (171 ft 5 in) | |
| 19 | (New Zealand) Tapenisa Havea | Arizona | X | 48.96 | 52.05 | | | | 52.05 m (170 ft 9 in) | |
| 20 | (Montenegro) Kristina Rakočević | Miami (FL) | X | 50.81 | 51.94 | | | | 51.94 m (170 ft 4 3/4 in) | |
| 21 | (United States) Klaire Kovatch | Colorado State | 47.69 | 50.81 | 51.81 | | | | 51.81 m (169 ft 11 3/4 in) | |
| 22 | (Grenada) Jamora Alves | St. John's | 46.76 | X | 50.08 | | | | 50.08 m (164 ft 3 1/2 in) | |
| 23 | (United States) Taylor Kesner | Illinois State | 47.22 | 49.43 | 49.75 | | | | 49.75 m (163 ft 2 1/2 in) | |
| 24 | (United States) Emily March | Iowa State | 49.36 | X | 48.96 | | | | 49.36 m (161 ft 11 1/4 in) | |

==== Javelin throw ====
| Rank | Athlete | Team | 1 | 2 | 3 | 4 | 5 | 6 | Mark | Notes |
|---|---|---|---|---|---|---|---|---|---|---|
| 1st place, gold medalist(s) | (The Bahamas) Rhema Otabor | Nebraska | 59.04 | 59.49 | 56.06 | 56.66 | X | 58.03 | 59.49 m (195 ft 2 in) | CL |
| 2nd place, silver medalist(s) | (Australia) Lianna Davidson | Texas A&M | 57.70 | 56.28 | 55.18 | 55.05 | 58.78 | 56.91 | 58.78 m (192 ft 10 in) | PB |
| 3rd place, bronze medalist(s) | (United States) Katelyn Fairchild | Texas A&M | 57.02 | X | 53.87 | 57.97 | 53.48 | X | 57.97 m (190 ft 2 1/4 in) | PB |
| 4 | (United States) Maddie Harris | Nebraska | 57.26 | 53.87 | X | 54.53 | 53.64 | 49.46 | 57.26 m (187 ft 10 1/4 in) | |
| 5 | (United States) Skylar Coccolini | Missouri | 50.67 | 56.03 | - | 52.65 | 46.77 | 53.40 | 56.03 m (183 ft 9 3/4 in) | SB |
| 6 | (Puerto Rico) Sophia Rivera | Missouri | 49.27 | 47.43 | 55.92 | 51.35 | X | 49.44 | 55.92 m (183 ft 5 1/2 in) | |
| 7 | (Italy) Federica Botter | UCLA | 55.79 | X | 55.08 | 52.36 | 53.48 | 52.54 | 55.79 m (183 ft 1/4 in) | |
| 8 | (United States) Madison Wiltrout | North Carolina | 55.04 | 50.21 | 50.70 | 52.81 | 47.33 | 50.96 | 55.04 m (180 ft 6 3/4 in) | |
| 9 | (United States) Megan Albamonti | Delaware | 54.46 | 50.85 | 51.23 | X | 53.10 | 53.56 | 54.46 m (178 ft 8 in) | |
| 10 | (Norway) Stella Weinberg | Florida State | 48.11 | 51.58 | 52.45 | | | | 52.45 m (172 ft 3/4 in) | PB |
| 11 | (South Africa) McKyla van der Westhuizen | Rice | 50.32 | X | 52.29 | | | | 52.29 m (171 ft 6 1/2 in) | |
| 12 | (Italy) Carolina Visca | California | 49.04 | X | 51.83 | | | | 51.83 m (170 ft 1/2 in) | |
| 13 | (United States) Maria Bienvenu | Louisiana | 51.58 | X | 51.21 | | | | 51.58 m (169 ft 2 1/2 in) | |
| 14 | (Norway) Arianne Duarte Morais | UTEP | 51.43 | 50.01 | X | | | | 51.43 m (168 ft 8 3/4 in) | |
| 15 | (United States) Dana Baker | Duke | 49.52 | 51.29 | 46.53 | | | | 51.29 m (168 ft 3 1/4 in) | |
| 16 | (United States) Ashton Riner | BYU | 50.33 | 49.54 | 51.00 | | | | 51.00 m (167 ft 3 3/4 in) | |
| 17 | (United States) Leonie Tröger | Cincinnati | 50.02 | X | X | | | | 50.02 m (164 ft 1 1/4 in) | |
| 18 | (United States) Julia Harisay | Georgia | 49.42 | X | 47.65 | | | | 49.42 m (162 ft 1 1/2 in) | SB |
| 19 | (United States) Maura Huwalt | Auburn | 47.83 | 49.02 | 48.67 | | | | 49.02 m (160 ft 9 3/4 in) | |
| 20 | (Netherlands) Ilhem Tamrouti | Duke | 48.61 | X | 40.44 | | | | 48.61 m (159 ft 5 3/4 in) | |
| 21 | (United States) Erin Long | Samford | 48.40 | X | 45.96 | | | | 48.40 m (158 ft 9 1/2 in) | |
| 22 | (United States) Kate Joyce | Princeton | 48.30 | 44.16 | 47.43 | | | | 48.30 m (158 ft 5 1/2 in) | |
| 23 | (Finland) Roosa Ylönen | UTEP | 45.48 | 45.56 | 47.90 | | | | 47.90 m (157 ft 1 3/4 in) | |
| 24 | (United States) Erin McMeniman | Georgia | 46.10 | 41.44 | 46.24 | | | | 46.24 m (151 ft 8 1/4 in) | |

==== Hammer throw ====
| Rank | Athlete | Team | 1 | 2 | 3 | 4 | 5 | 6 | Mark | Notes |
|---|---|---|---|---|---|---|---|---|---|---|
| 1st place, gold medalist(s) | (Australia) Stephanie Ratcliffe | Harvard | 73.63 | X | 72.86 | X | 71.40 | X | 73.63 m (241 ft 6 3/4 in) | CL |
| 2nd place, silver medalist(s) | (United States) Madison Malone | Auburn | 72.35 | 71.14 | 71.81 | 71.71 | 72.01 | 72.37 | 72.37 m (237 ft 5 in) | PB |
| 3rd place, bronze medalist(s) | (United Kingdom) Anna Purchase | California | 71.47 | X | X | X | X | 66.15 | 71.47 m (234 ft 5 3/4 in) | |
| 4 | (United States) Emma Robbins | Kansas State | 69.89 | 67.01 | 66.48 | X | 67.27 | 67.14 | 69.89 m (229 ft 3 1/2 in) | PB |
| 5 | (United Kingdom) Tara Simpson-Sullivan | Rice | 66.00 | 65.77 | 62.51 | 67.00 | X | X | 67.00 m (219 ft 9 3/4 in) | |
| 6 | (United States) Oluwasheyi Taiwo | Ole Miss | 64.93 | 64.56 | 66.99 | 63.58 | 66.56 | 62.77 | 66.99 m (219 ft 9 1/4 in) | |
| 7 | (Iceland) Elísabet Rut Rúnarsdóttir | Texas State | 61.97 | 64.93 | 62.75 | 61.43 | 65.37 | 66.98 | 66.98 m (219 ft 9 in) | PB |
| 8 | (United States) Taylor Gorum | Alabama | 64.15 | 65.85 | 66.60 | 64.79 | 63.40 | 61.15 | 66.60 m (218 ft 6 in) | PB |
| 9 | (United States) Shelby Moran | Oregon | 63.97 | 63.56 | 66.28 | 65.79 | 66.00 | 64.19 | 66.28 m (217 ft 5 1/4 in) | |
| 10 | (Brazil) Ana da Silva | Georgia | 64.54 | 64.60 | 64.48 | | | | 64.60 m (211 ft 11 1/4 in) | PB |
| 11 | (United States) Mayyi Mahama | UCLA | X | 64.57 | X | | | | 64.57 m (211 ft 10 in) | |
| 12 | (United States) Amanda Howe | Iowa | 63.79 | 61.58 | X | | | | 63.79 m (209 ft 3 1/4 in) | SB |
| 13 | (Netherlands) Audrey Jacobs | California | 63.77 | X | 62.44 | | | | 63.77 m (209 ft 2 1/2 in) | |
| 14 | (Jamaica) Marie Forbes | Clemson | X | 63.62 | 62.40 | | | | 63.62 m (208 ft 8 1/2 in) | |
| 15 | (Iceland) Guðrún Karítas Hallgrímsdóttir | VCU | 61.64 | X | 63.62 | | | | 63.62 m (208 ft 8 1/2 in) | |
| 16 | (United States) Makenna Wilson | Northern Iowa | X | 63.32 | 62.51 | | | | 63.32 m (207 ft 8 3/4 in) | |
| 17 | (United States) Kali Terza | Kennesaw State | 62.63 | X | 60.98 | | | | 62.63 m (205 ft 5 1/2 in) | |
| 18 | (United States) Samantha Kunza | Alabama | 56.38 | 61.90 | 60.00 | | | | 61.90 m (203 ft 1 in) | |
| 19 | (United States) Chandler Hayden | Tennessee | 60.84 | 61.47 | X | | | | 61.47 m (201 ft 8 in) | |
| 20 | (United States) Lydia Knapp | South Dakota | X | 59.62 | 61.42 | | | | 61.42 m (201 ft 6 in) | |
| 21 | (United States) Kassidy Gallagher | Oklahoma | 57.90 | 60.38 | 58.47 | | | | 60.38 m (198 ft 1 in) | |
| 22 | (United States) Mari Shavers | Northern Iowa | 59.41 | X | 60.27 | | | | 60.27 m (197 ft 8 3/4 in) | |
| 23 | (Czech Republic) Barbora Štejfová | Virginia Tech | X | 59.65 | 58.69 | | | | 59.65 m (195 ft 8 1/4 in) | |
| 24 | (United Kingdom) Amber Simpson | Memphis | 57.21 | 59.24 | X | | | | 59.24 m (194 ft 4 1/4 in) | |

==== Heptathlon ====
| Rank | Athlete | Team | Overall points | 100 m | HJ | SP | 200 m | LJ | JT | 800 m |
|---|---|---|---|---|---|---|---|---|---|---|
| 1st place, gold medalist(s) | (Estonia) Pippi Lotta Enok | Oklahoma | 6165 | 1013; 13.76 | 916; 1.75 m (5 ft 8 3/4 in) | 676; 12.22 m (40 ft 1 in) | 962; 24.20 | 943; 6.30 m (20 ft 8 in) | 795; 46.65 m (153 ft 1/2 in) | 860; 2:17.36 |
| 2nd place, silver medalist(s) | (Lithuania) Beatričė Juškevičiūtė | Vanderbilt | 6117 | 1074; 13.34 | 842; 1.69 m (5 ft 6 1/2 in) | 769; 13.63 m (44 ft 8 1/2 in) | 990; 23.90 | 883; 6.11 m (20 ft 1/2 in) | 720; 42.74 m (140 ft 2 1/2 in) | 839; 2:18.89 |
| 3rd place, bronze medalist(s) | (Latvia) Kristīne Blaževiča | Texas | 6058 | 1055; 13.47 | 879; 1.72 m (5 ft 7 1/2 in) | 716; 12.83 m (42 ft 1 in) | 909; 24.76 | 877; 6.09 m (19 ft 11 3/4 in) | 726; 43.08 m (141 ft 4 in) | 896; 2:14.75 |
| 4 | (United States) Allie Jones | USC | 6052 | 1114; 13.07 | 842; 1.69 m (5 ft 6 1/2 in) | 690; 12.43 m (40 ft 9 1/4 in) | 1019; 23.60 | 859; 6.03 m (19 ft 9 1/4 in) | 626; 37.83 m (124 ft 1 1/4 in) | 902; 2:14.33 |
| 5 | (United States) Jenelle Rogers | Ball State | 6018 | 1043; 13.55 | 879; 1.72 m (5 ft 7 1/2 in) | 898; 15.55 m (51 ft 0 in) | 1020; 23.59 | 949; 6.32 m (20 ft 8 3/4 in) | 426; 27.30 m (89 ft 6 3/4 in) | 803; 2:21.55 |
| 6 | (Grenada) Joniar Thomas | Texas A&M | 5967 | 1017; 13.73 | 736; 1.60 m (5 ft 2 3/4 in) | 684; 12.35 m (40 ft 6 in) | 1006; 23.74 | 1010; 6.51 m (21 ft 4 1/4 in) | 744; 43.99 m (144 ft 3 3/4 in) | 770; 2:23.98 |
| 7 | (United States) Jadin O'Brien | Notre Dame | 5940 | 993; 13.90 | 842; 1.69 m (5 ft 6 1/2 in) | 815; 14.32 m (46 ft 11 3/4 in) | 950; 24.32 | 792; 5.81 m (19 ft 1/2 in) | 685; 40.90 m (134 ft 2 in) | 863; 2:17.13 |
| 8 | (Australia) Camryn Newton-Smith | Arkansas State | 5887 | 1020; 13.71 | 879; 1.72 m (5 ft 7 1/2 in) | 699; 12.57 m (41 ft 2 3/4 in) | 822; 25.72 | 946; 6.31 m (20 ft 8 1/4 in) | 768; 45.23 m (148 ft 4 1/2 in) | 753; 2:25.28 |
| 9 | (Lithuania) Urtė Bačianskaitė | Kansas State | 5790 | 928; 14.36 | 806; 1.66 m (5 ft 5 1/4 in) | 874; 15.19 m (49 ft 10 in) | 838; 25.54 | 807; 5.86 m (19 ft 2 1/2 in) | 761; 44.85 m (147 ft 1 1/2 in) | 776; 2:23.54 |
| 10 | (United States) Avery McMullen | Colorado | 5752 | 1046; 13.53 | 916; 1.75 m (5 ft 8 3/4 in) | 622; 11.41 m (37 ft 5 in) | 963; 24.18 | 887; 6.12 m (20 ft 3/4 in) | 520; 32.27 m (105 ft 10 1/4 in) | 798; 2:21.88 |
| 11 | (Germany) Jenna Fee Feyerabend | San Diego State | 5742 | 968; 14.07 | 879; 1.72 m (5 ft 7 1/2 in) | 768; 13.61 m (44 ft 7 3/4 in) | 832; 25.61 | 822; 5.91 m (19 ft 4 1/2 in) | 660; 39.62 m (129 ft 11 3/4 in) | 813; 2:20.75 |
| 12 | (United States) Alaina Brady | Notre Dame | 5739 | 1071; 13.36 | 806; 1.66 m (5 ft 5 1/4 in) | 702; 12.62 m (41 ft 4 3/4 in) | 876; 25.12 | 816; 5.89 m (19 ft 3 3/4 in) | 666; 39.92 m (130 ft 11 1/2 in) | 802; 2:21.56 |
| 13 | (United States) Bailey Golden | Oklahoma State | 5656 | 964; 14.10 | 879; 1.72 m (5 ft 7 1/2 in) | 674; 12.20 m (40 ft 1/4 in) | 860; 25.29 | 825; 5.92 m (19 ft 5 in) | 709; 42.17 m (138 ft 4 in) | 745; 2:25.90 |
| 14 | (Sweden) Angel Richmore | Stephen F. Austin | 5636 | 905; 14.53 | 879; 1.72 m (5 ft 7 1/2 in) | 821; 14.41 m (47 ft 3 1/4 in) | 771; 26.30 | 762; 5.71 m (18 ft 8 3/4 in) | 793; 46.51 m (152 ft 7 in) | 705; 2:29.03 |
| 15 | (Canada) Kristen O'Handley | Tulane | 5598 | 978; 14.00 | 842; 1.69 m (5 ft 6 1/2 in) | 680; 12.29 m (40 ft 3 3/4 in) | 1023; 23.56 | 700; 5.50 m (18 ft 1/2 in) | 532; 32.91 m (107 ft 11 1/2 in) | 843; 2:18.57 |
| 16 | (United States) Timara Chapman | NC State | 5576 | 974; 14.03 | 842; 1.69 m (5 ft 6 1/2 in) | 656; 11.92 m (39 ft 1 1/4 in) | 903; 24.82 | 868; 6.06 m (19 ft 10 1/2 in) | 606; 36.79 m (120 ft 8 1/4 in) | 727; 2:27.33 |
| 17 | (United States) Taylor Chocek | Oregon | 5540 | 925; 14.38 | 842; 1.69 m (5 ft 6 1/2 in) | 713; 12.79 m (41 ft 11 1/2 in) | 891; 24.95 | 715; 5.55 m (18 ft 2 1/2 in) | 704; 41.92 m (137 ft 6 1/4 in) | 750; 2:25.49 |
| 18 | (Canada) Izzy Goudros | Harvard | 5460 | 966; 14.09 | 771; 1.63 m (5 ft 4 in) | 573; 10.66 m (34 ft 11 1/2 in) | 1001; 23.79 | 741; 5.64 m (18 ft 6 in) | 542; 33.43 m (109 ft 8 in) | 866; 2:16.91 |
| 19 | (Norway) Elise Hoel Ulseth | North Dakota | 5274 | 953; 14.18 | 842; 1.69 m (5 ft 6 1/2 in) | 663; 12.03 m (39 ft 5 1/2 in) | 795; 26.03 | 706; 5.52 m (18 ft 1 1/4 in) | 668; 40.04 m (131 ft 4 1/4 in) | 647; 2:33.69 |
| 20 | (United States) Tionna Tobias | Iowa | 5269 | 1090; 13.23 | 806; 1.66 m (5 ft 5 1/4 in) | 549; 10.30 m (33 ft 9 1/2 in) | 993; 23.87 | 953; 6.33 m (20 ft 9 in) | 344; 22.97 m (75 ft 4 1/4 in) | 534; 2:43.41 |
| 21 | (United Kingdom) Alix Still | Virginia | 4488 | DNF | 806; 1.66 m (5 ft 5 1/4 in) | 613; 11.27 m (36 ft 11 1/2 in) | 891; 24.95 | 759; 5.70 m (18 ft 8 1/4 in) | 584; 35.65 m (116 ft 11 1/2 in) | 835; 2:19.13 |
| | (United States) Sterling Lester | Florida | DNF | 1071; 13.36 | 806; 1.66 m (5 ft 5 1/4 in) | 650; 11.83 m (38 ft 9 1/2 in) | 1027; 23.52 | 804; 5.85 m (19 ft 2 1/4 in) | 411; 26.54 m (87 ft 3/4 in) | DNS |
| | (Norway) Ida Eikeng | Washington | DNF | 1072; 13.35 | NH | DNS | DNS | DNS | DNS | DNS |
| | (United States) Jada Sims | Vanderbilt | DNF | 929; 14.35 | 842; 1.69 m (5 ft 6 1/2 in) | 624; 11.44 m (37 ft 6 1/4 in) | 914; 24.71 | 643; 5.30 m (17 ft 4 1/2 in) | DNS | DNS |

== Standings ==
=== Men ===
- Only top ten teams shown

| Rank | Team | Conference | Score |
|---|---|---|---|
| 1st place, gold medalist(s) | Florida | SEC | 57 |
| 2nd place, silver medalist(s) | Arkansas | SEC | 53 |
| 3rd place, bronze medalist(s) | Stanford | Pac-12 | 44 |
| 4 | LSU | SEC | 43 |
| 5 | Arizona State | Pac-12 | 41 |
| 6 | Texas Tech | Big 12 | 34.5 |
| 7 | Georgia | SEC | 28 |
| 8 | Alabama | SEC | 27 |
| 9 | Washington | Pac-12 | 26.5 |
| 10 | BYU | WCC | 22.5 |

=== Women ===
- Only top ten teams shown

| Rank | Team | Conference | Score |
|---|---|---|---|
| 1st place, gold medalist(s) | Texas | Big 12 | 83 |
| 2nd place, silver medalist(s) | Florida | SEC | 51 |
| 3rd place, bronze medalist(s) | Arkansas | SEC | 46 |
| 4 | Oregon | Pac-12 | 44 |
| 5 | Texas A&M | SEC | 36 |
| 6 | Kentucky | SEC | 28 |
| 7 | LSU | SEC | 26 |
| 8 | Nebraska | Big Ten | 25 |
| 9 | Harvard | Ivy League | 23 |
| 10 | Tennessee | SEC | 19 |
| 10 | Georgia | SEC | 19 |

== Schedule ==
WEDNESDAY, JUNE 7th
TRACK EVENTS
| TIME PT | EVENT | ROUND DIVISION |
|---|---|---|
| 4:32 p.m. | 4x100 Relay | Semifinal Men |
| 4:46 p.m. | 1500 Meters | Semifinal Men |
| 5:02 p.m. | 3000 Steeplechase | Semifinal Men |
| 5:32 p.m. | 110 Meter Hurdles | Semifinal Men |
| 5:46 p.m. | 100 Meters | Semifinal Men |
| 6:00 p.m. | 400 Meters | Semifinal Men |
| 6:14 p.m. | 800 Meters | Semifinal Men |
| 6:30 p.m. | 400 Meter Hurdles | Semifinal Men |
| 6:44 p.m. | 200 Meters | Semifinal Men |
| 6:56 p.m. | 400 Meters | Decathlon |
| 7:08 p.m. | 10,000 Meters | Final Men |
| 7:48 p.m. | 4x400 Relay | Semifinal Men |
FIELD EVENTS
| TIME PT | EVENT | ROUND DIVISION |
| 12:30 p.m. | Hammer Throw | Final Men |
| 3:40 p.m. | Javelin Throw | Final Men |
| 4:30 p.m. | Pole Vault | Final Men |
| 6:00 p.m. | Long Jump | Final Men |
| 6:10 p.m. | Shot Put | Final Men |
Men Decathlon
| TIME PT | EVENT | ROUND DIVISION |
| 12:30 p.m. | 100 Meters | Decathlon Men |
| 1:10 p.m. | Long Jump | Decathlon Men |
| 2:25 p.m. | Shot Put | Decathlon Men |
| 3:40 p.m. | High Jump | Decathlon Men |
| 6:56 p.m. | 400 Meters | Decathlon Men |
THURSDAY, JUNE 8th
TRACK EVENTS
| TIME PT | EVENT | ROUND DIVISION |
| 5:32 p.m. | 4x100 Relay | Semifinal Women |
| 5:46 p.m. | 1500 Meters | Semifinal Women |
| 6:02 p.m. | 3000 Steeplechase | Semifinal Women |
| 6:32 p.m. | 100 Meter Hurdles | Semifinal Women |
| 6:46 p.m. | 100 Meters | Semifinal Women |
| 7:00 p.m. | 400 Meters | Semifinal Women |
| 7:14 p.m. | 800 Meters | Semifinal Women |
| 7:30 p.m. | 400 Meter Hurdles | Semifinal Women |
| 7:44 p.m. | 200 Meters | Semifinal Women |
| 7:56 p.m. | 1500 Meters | Decathlon |
| 8:08 p.m. | 10,000 Meters | Final Women |
| 8:48 p.m. | 4x400 Relay | Semifinal Women |
FIELD EVENTS
| TIME PT | EVENT | ROUND DIVISION |
| 3:00 p.m. | Hammer Throw | Final Women |
| 5:10 p.m. | Javelin Throw | Final Women |
| 5:30 p.m. | Pole Vault | Final Women |
| 7:00 p.m. | Long Jump | Final Women |
| 7:10 p.m. | Shot Put | Final Women |
Men Decathlon
| TIME PT | EVENT | ROUND DIVISION |
| 10:30 a.m. | 110 Hurdles | Decathlon Men |
| 11:20 p.m. | Discus | Decathlon Men |
| 12:30 p.m. | Pole Vault | Decathlon Men |
| 3:00 p.m. | Javelin | Decathlon Men |
| 7:56 p.m. | 1500 Meters | Decathlon Men |
FRIDAY, JUNE 9th
TRACK EVENTS
| TIME PT | EVENT | ROUND DIVISION |
| 6:02 p.m. | 4x100 Relay | Final Men |
| 6:12 p.m. | 1500 Meters | Final Men |
| 6:24 p.m. | 3000 Steeplechase | Final Men |
| 6:42 p.m. | 110 Meter Hurdles | Final Men |
| 6:52 p.m. | 100 Meters | Final Men |
| 7:02 p.m. | 400 Meters | Final Men |
| 7:14 p.m. | 800 Meters | Final Men |
| 7:27 p.m. | 400 Meter Hurdles | Final Men |
| 7:37 p.m. | 200 Meters | Final Men |
| 7:43 p.m. | 200 Meters | Heptathlon |
| 7:55 p.m. | 5000 Meters | Final Men |
| 8:21 p.m. | 4x400 Relay | Final Men |
FIELD EVENTS
| TIME PT | EVENT | ROUND DIVISION |
| 5:30 p.m. | High Jump | Final Men |
| 5:35 p.m. | Discus | Final Men |
| 6:10 p.m. | Triple Jump | Final Men |
Women Heptathlon
| TIME PT | EVENT | ROUND DIVISION |
| 12:45 p.m. | 100 Meters | Heptathlon Women |
| 1:45 p.m. | High Jump | Heptathlon Women |
| 3:45 p.m. | Shot Put | Heptathlon Women |
| 7:43 p.m. | 200 Meters | Heptathlon Women |
SATURDAY, JUNE 10th
TRACK EVENTS
| TIME PT | EVENT | ROUND DIVISION |
| 6:02 p.m. | 4x100 Relay | Final Women |
| 6:12 p.m. | 1500 Meters | Final Women |
| 6:24 p.m. | 3000 Steeplechase | Final Women |
| 6:42 p.m. | 100 Meter Hurdles | Final Women |
| 6:52 p.m. | 100 Meters | Final Women |
| 7:02 p.m. | 400 Meters | Final Women |
| 7:14 p.m. | 800 Meters | Final Women |
| 7:27 p.m. | 400 Meter Hurdles | Final Women |
| 7:37 p.m. | 200 Meters | Final Women |
| 7:43 p.m. | 800 Meters | Heptathlon |
| 7:55 p.m. | 5000 Meters | Final Women |
| 8:21 p.m. | 4x400 Relay | Final Women |
FIELD EVENTS
| TIME PT | EVENT | ROUND DIVISION |
| 5:30 p.m. | High Jump | Final Women |
| 5:35 p.m. | Discus | Final Women |
| 6:10 p.m. | Triple Jump | Final Women |
Women Heptathlon
| TIME PT | EVENT | ROUND DIVISION |
| 2:00 p.m. | Long Jump | Heptathlon Women |
| 3:15 p.m. | Javelin | Heptathlon Women |
| 7:43 p.m. | 800 Meters | Heptathlon Women |

== See also ==
- NCAA Men's Division I Outdoor Track and Field Championships
- NCAA Women's Division I Outdoor Track and Field Championships
- 2022 NCAA Division I Indoor Track and Field Championships
