= Brandon Hicklin =

American athlete (born 1999)

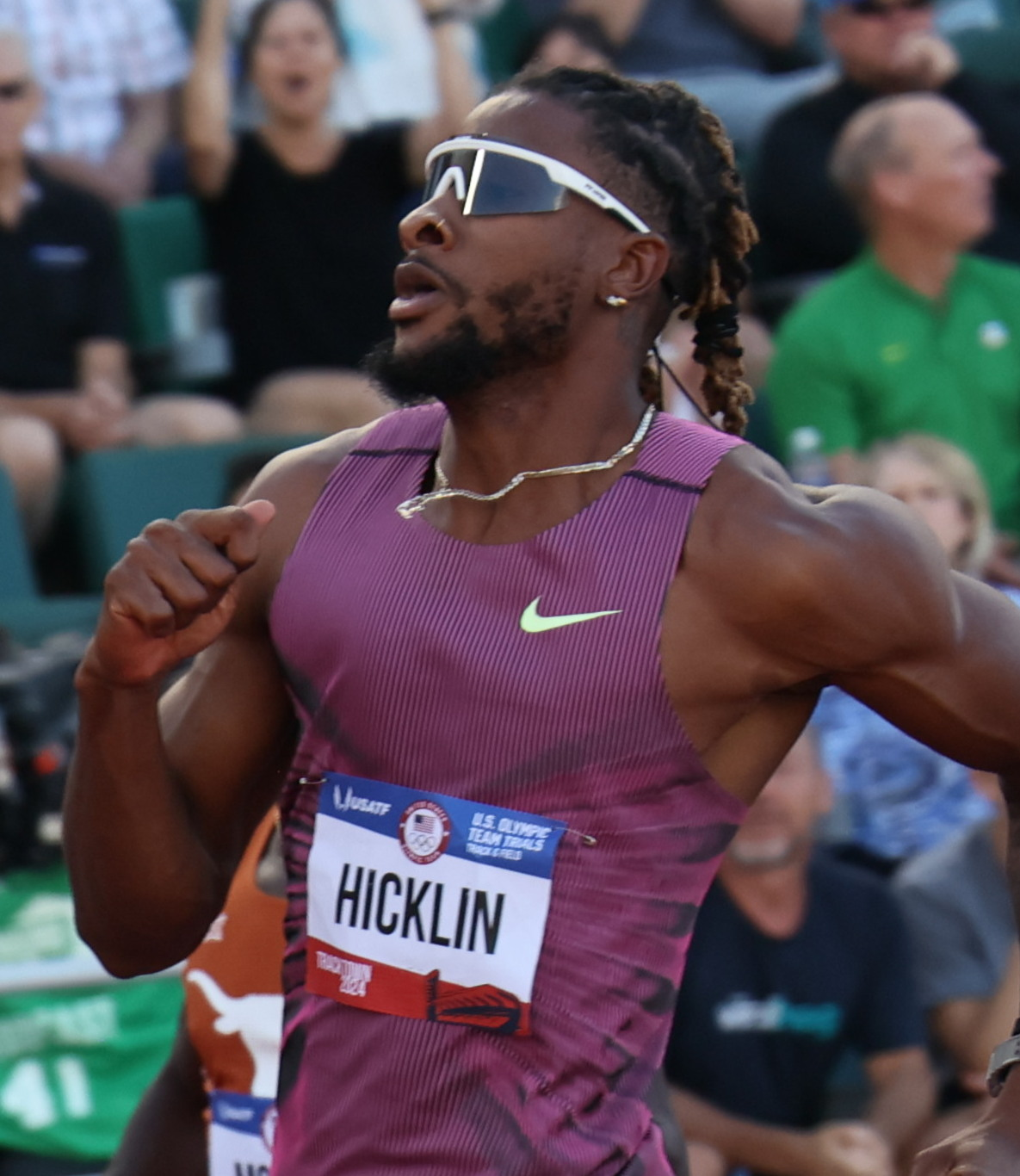
- Hicklin in 2024

Personal information
- Nationality: United States
- Born: April 2, 1999 (age 27)

Sport
- Sport: Athletics
- Event: Sprint

Achievements and titles
- Personal bests: 60 m: 6.65 (Albuquerque, 2023); 100 m: 9.93 (Clermont, 2025); 200 m: 20.40 (Miami, 2025); Long jump: 8.18m (Greenboro, 2022)
Medal record
Men's athletics
Representing the United States
World Relays
Silver medal – second place	2025 Guangzhou	4×100 m relay

Brandon Hicklin (born April 2, 1999) is an American sprinter. He was runner-up in the 200 metres at the 2026 USA Outdoor Track and Field Championships.

== Early life ==
From Spartanburg, South Carolina he attended Spartanburg High School, North Carolina A&T and Louisiana State University. He competed in field events as well as sprints, including long jump.

== Career ==
In May 2023, in Jacksonville at the NCAA East trials he ran a wind-assisted 9.96 seconds 100 metres. His LSU 4x100m relay team college record of 37.90 seconds at the SEC Championship in Baton Rouge in June 2023. He also qualified for the individual 100 metres at the NCAA Championships held in Texas in June 2023. At the event, the LSU 4x100m relay team consisting of Hicklin, Dorian Camel, Da'Marcus Fleming and Godson Oghenebrume won the gold medal.

Hicklin officially broke the 10-second barrier for the first time when he ran 9.94 seconds for the 100 metres at the LSU Invitational, in Baton Rouge, on April 27, 2024. He made his Diamond League debut in the Rabat on 19 May 2024 and finished fourth in the 100 metres in 10.26 seconds. He finished third at the 2024 Prefontaine Classic in the 100 metres in 10.08 seconds.

On 26 April he ran 9.93 seconds (+1.8 m/s) in Clermont, Florida. He was brought in as a late replacement for Fred Kerley at the 2025 Grand Slam Track event in Miami on 2 May 2025.

He was named in the American team for the 2025 World Athletics Relays in Guangzhou, China in May 2025. He ran as part of the men's 4x100m relay team which won their heat and qualified a team for the World Championships before placing second overall. Later that month, he finished fifth in the 100 metres at the 2025 Meeting International Mohammed VI d'Athlétisme de Rabat, part of the 2025 Diamond League. He finished fourth in 10.04 seconds in the 100 metres at the Diamond League event at the 2025 Golden Gala in Rome on 6 June 2025 and fourth in 9.98 seconds in the 100 metres at the 2025 Prefontaine Classic on 5 July. He reached the semi-finals of the 100 metres at the 2025 USA Outdoor Track and Field Championships. He placed fifth in 10.09 seconds in the 100 metres at the Diamond League Final in Zurich on 28 August.

On 24 July, he was a finalist at the 2026 USA Outdoor Track and Field Championships over 100 metres, placing sixth overall. The following day, he returned to the championships and placed second behind Garrett Kaalund in the 200 metres final, with Hicklin and Max Thomas both finishing in 20.29 seconds. In September, he competed over 200 m at the inaugural World Ultimate Championship in Budapest.

== Statistics ==
Grand Slam Track results
Slam	Race group	Event	Pl.	Time	Prize money
2025 Miami Slam	Short sprints	100 m	5th	9.98	US$25,000
2025 Miami Slam	Short sprints	200 m	5th	20.40	US$25,000
