= Stanford Cardinal track and field =

College track and field team

- University: Stanford University
- Athletic director: John Donahoe
- Head coach: J. J. Clark
- Conference: ACC
- Location: Stanford, California
- Outdoor track: Cobb Track and Angell Field
- Nickname: Cardinal
- Colors: Cardinal and white

NCAA Outdoor National Championships
- Men: 1925, 1928, 1934, 2000

The Stanford Cardinal track and field team is the track and field program that represents Stanford University. The Cardinal compete in NCAA Division I as a member of the Atlantic Coast Conference. The team is based in Stanford, California at the Cobb Track and Angell Field.

The program is coached by J. J. Clark. The track and field program officially encompasses four teams because the NCAA considers men's and women's indoor track and field and outdoor track and field as separate sports.

The men's team most recently won the 2000 NCAA Division I Outdoor Track and Field Championships in large part due to their distance runners.

== Postseason ==
=== AIAW ===
The Panthers have had 4 AIAW All-Americans finishing in the top six at the AIAW indoor or outdoor championships.

AIAW All-Americans
Championships	Name	Event	Place
1980 Outdoor	Marie Ribik	High jump	4th
1980 Outdoor	Mary Osborne	Javelin throw	2nd
1981 Indoor	Kim Schnurpfeil	5000 meters	2nd
1981 Indoor	Pamela Donald	Long jump	5th
1981 Outdoor	Mary Osborne	Javelin throw	4th

=== NCAA ===
As of 2024, a total of 198 men and 81 women have achieved individual first-team All-American status at the Division I men's outdoor, women's outdoor, men's indoor, or women's indoor national championships (using the modern criteria of top-8 placing regardless of athlete nationality).

First team NCAA All-Americans
Team	Championships	Name	Event	Place	Ref.
Men's	1921 Outdoor	Flint Hanner	Javelin throw	1st	
Men's	1923 Outdoor	Hugo Leistner	220 yards hurdles	4th	
Men's	1923 Outdoor	Ian Campbell	100 meters	6th	
Men's	1923 Outdoor	Blink Williamson	400 meters	5th	
Men's	1923 Outdoor	James Arthur	Shot put	4th	
Men's	1923 Outdoor	James Arthur	Discus throw	3rd	
Men's	1923 Outdoor	Frederick Ludeke	Hammer throw	4th	
Men's	1925 Outdoor	Hugo Leistner	220 yards hurdles	2nd	
Men's	1925 Outdoor	Hugo Leistner	110 meters hurdles	1st	
Men's	1925 Outdoor	Ted Miller	400 meters	3rd	
Men's	1925 Outdoor	Bill Richardson	800 meters	2nd	
Men's	1925 Outdoor	Tom Work	High jump	4th	
Men's	1925 Outdoor	Glenn Haftranft	Shot put	1st	
Men's	1925 Outdoor	Biff Hoffman	Discus throw	1st	
Men's	1925 Outdoor	Glenn Hartranft	Discus throw	2nd	
Men's	1926 Outdoor	Robert King	High jump	3rd	
Men's	1926 Outdoor	Biff Hoffman	Shot put	3rd	
Men's	1926 Outdoor	Biff Hoffman	Discus throw	5th	
Men's	1928 Outdoor	Emerson Spencer	400 meters	1st	
Men's	1928 Outdoor	Robert King	High jump	1st	
Men's	1928 Outdoor	Ward Edmonds	Pole vault	1st	
Men's	1928 Outdoor	Kim Dyer	Long jump	2nd	
Men's	1928 Outdoor	Harlow Rothert	Shot put	1st	
Men's	1928 Outdoor	Eric Krenz	Shot put	2nd	
Men's	1928 Outdoor	Albert Forster	Shot put	6th	
Men's	1928 Outdoor	Eric Krenz	Discus throw	1st	
Men's	1928 Outdoor	Leo Kibby	Javelin throw	4th	
Men's	1928 Outdoor	Bill Sparling	Javelin throw	6th	
Men's	1929 Outdoor	Ward Edmonds	Pole vault	1st	
Men's	1929 Outdoor	Harlow Rothert	Shot put	1st	
Men's	1929 Outdoor	Eric Krenz	Shot put	2nd	
Men's	1929 Outdoor	Eric Krenz	Discus throw	6th	
Men's	1930 Outdoor	Harlow Rothert	Shot put	1st	
Men's	1930 Outdoor	Eric Krenz	Shot put	2nd	
Men's	1930 Outdoor	Eric Krenz	Discus throw	2nd	
Men's	1930 Outdoor	Harlow Rothert	Discus throw	5th	
Men's	1933 Outdoor	Gus Meier	220 yards hurdles	4th	
Men's	1933 Outdoor	Gus Meier	110 meters hurdles	1st	
Men's	1933 Outdoor	William Miller	Pole vault	5th	
Men's	1933 Outdoor	Henri Laborde	Shot put	5th	
Men's	1933 Outdoor	Henri Laborde	Discus throw	1st	
Men's	1934 Outdoor	Jimmy Willson	100 meters	5th	
Men's	1934 Outdoor	Sam Klopstock	110 meters hurdles	1st	
Men's	1934 Outdoor	Jimmy Willson	200 meters	3rd	
Men's	1934 Outdoor	Charles Nimmo	Mile run	6th	
Men's	1934 Outdoor	Bud Deacon	Pole vault	2nd	
Men's	1934 Outdoor	Jack Lyman	Shot put	2nd	
Men's	1934 Outdoor	Gordon Dunn	Shot put	4th	
Men's	1934 Outdoor	Gordon Dunn	Discus throw	1st	
Men's	1934 Outdoor	Jack Lyman	Discus throw	3rd	
Men's	1934 Outdoor	John Mottram	Javelin throw	2nd	
Men's	1935 Outdoor	Sam Klopstock	110 meters hurdles	2nd	
Men's	1935 Outdoor	Humbert Smith	High jump	5th	
Men's	1935 Outdoor	Jim Reynolds	Shot put	6th	
Men's	1935 Outdoor	Phil Levy	Discus throw	5th	
Men's	1935 Outdoor	John Mottram	Javelin throw	2nd	
Men's	1936 Outdoor	Sam Klopstock	110 meters hurdles	3rd	
Men's	1936 Outdoor	Jack Weiershauser	200 meters	4th	
Men's	1936 Outdoor	Jack Weiershauser	400 meters	4th	
Men's	1936 Outdoor	Bill McCurdy	800 meters	7th	
Men's	1936 Outdoor	Humbert Smith	High jump	7th	
Men's	1936 Outdoor	Jim Reynolds	Shot put	1st	
Men's	1936 Outdoor	Phil Levy	Discus throw	2nd	
Men's	1937 Outdoor	Jack Weiershauser	220 yards hurdles	2nd	
Men's	1937 Outdoor	Jack Weiershauser	200 meters	2nd	
Men's	1937 Outdoor	Ray Malott	400 meters	2nd	
Men's	1937 Outdoor	Bill McCurdy	400 meters	6th	
Men's	1937 Outdoor	Bob Alexander	Mile run	6th	
Men's	1937 Outdoor	Jim Reynolds	Shot put	3rd	
Men's	1937 Outdoor	Pete Zagar	Discus throw	1st	
Men's	1937 Outdoor	Hugh Gribben	Discus throw	2nd	
Men's	1938 Outdoor	Ray Malott	200 meters	2nd	
Men's	1938 Outdoor	Ray Malott	400 meters	1st	
Men's	1938 Outdoor	Stan Anderson	Shot put	5th	
Men's	1938 Outdoor	Pete Zagar	Discus throw	1st	
Men's	1938 Outdoor	Hugh Gribben	Discus throw	2nd	
Men's	1939 Outdoor	Bill Hawkins	220 yards hurdles	6th	
Men's	1939 Outdoor	Stan Hiserman	220 yards hurdles	5th	
Men's	1939 Outdoor	Clyde Jeffrey	100 meters	2nd	
Men's	1939 Outdoor	Clyde Jeffrey	200 meters	1st	
Men's	1939 Outdoor	Paul Moore	800 meters	4th	
Men's	1939 Outdoor	Marston Girard	Mile run	5th	
Men's	1939 Outdoor	Jim Lincoln	High jump	4th	
Men's	1939 Outdoor	Stan Anderson	Shot put	4th	
Men's	1939 Outdoor	William Wohle	Shot put	5th	
Men's	1939 Outdoor	Pete Zagar	Discus throw	1st	
Men's	1940 Outdoor	Clyde Jeffrey	100 meters	2nd	
Men's	1940 Outdoor	Paul Moore	800 meters	3rd	
Men's	1940 Outdoor	Russ Wulff	High jump	4th	
Men's	1940 Outdoor	Robert Kenyon	Pole vault	6th	
Men's	1940 Outdoor	Stan Anderson	Shot put	2nd	
Men's	1940 Outdoor	Arnold Cornet	Discus throw	4th	
Men's	1941 Outdoor	Jim Lincoln	High jump	6th	
Men's	1941 Outdoor	Bob Stone	Javelin throw	6th	
Men's	1942 Outdoor	Ed Hertel	110 meters hurdles	4th	
Men's	1942 Outdoor	Vernon Hart	High jump	6th	
Men's	1942 Outdoor	Russell Peck	Pole vault	6th	
Men's	1942 Outdoor	Ed Stamm	Shot put	4th	
Men's	1943 Outdoor	John Fulton	400 meters	3rd	
Men's	1943 Outdoor	Willard Smith	High jump	2nd	
Men's	1948 Outdoor	William Larson	Pole vault	4th	
Men's	1948 Outdoor	Gay Bryan	Long jump	5th	
Men's	1948 Outdoor	Otis Chandler	Shot put	4th	
Men's	1948 Outdoor	Bud Held	Javelin throw	1st	
Men's	1949 Outdoor	Downing McKee	110 meters hurdles	5th	
Men's	1949 Outdoor	Gay Bryan	200 meters	5th	
Men's	1949 Outdoor	Larry Hoff	400 meters	5th	
Men's	1949 Outdoor	Gay Bryan	Long jump	4th	
Men's	1949 Outdoor	Otis Chandler	Shot put	3rd	
Men's	1949 Outdoor	Lew Davis	Shot put	4th	
Men's	1949 Outdoor	Bud Held	Javelin throw	1st	
Men's	1950 Outdoor	Gay Bryan	220 yards hurdles	4th	
Men's	1950 Outdoor	Gay Bryan	Long jump	5th	
Men's	1950 Outdoor	Merrit van Sant	Long jump	7th	
Men's	1950 Outdoor	Otis Chandler	Shot put	2nd	
Men's	1950 Outdoor	Lew Davis	Shot put	4th	
Men's	1950 Outdoor	Bud Held	Javelin throw	1st	
Men's	1951 Outdoor	Bob Simon	3000 meters	7th	
Men's	1951 Outdoor	Bob Mathias	Shot put	6th	
Men's	1951 Outdoor	Chuck Hokanson	Shot put	8th	
Men's	1951 Outdoor	Bob Mathias	Discus throw	2nd	
Men's	1951 Outdoor	Chuck Renfro	Discus throw	7th	
Men's	1952 Outdoor	Bob Mathias	110 meters hurdles	2nd	
Men's	1952 Outdoor	Bob Simon	1500 meters	6th	
Men's	1952 Outdoor	Bob Reed	5000 meters	5th	
Men's	1952 Outdoor	Howard Hertz	Shot put	4th	
Men's	1952 Outdoor	Chuck Hokanson	Shot put	5th	
Men's	1952 Outdoor	Bob Mathias	Shot put	7th	
Men's	1952 Outdoor	Bob Mathias	Discus throw	6th	
Men's	1952 Outdoor	Bob Kimball	Javelin throw	4th	
Men's	1952 Outdoor	Leo Long	Javelin throw	5th	
Men's	1952 Outdoor	Chuck Harlow	Javelin throw	7th	
Men's	1953 Outdoor	Gerry Wood	110 meters hurdles	4th	
Men's	1953 Outdoor	Bob Simon	Mile run	8th	
Men's	1953 Outdoor	Howard Hertz	Shot put	5th	
Men's	1953 Outdoor	Chuck Renfro	Discus throw	3rd	
Men's	1953 Outdoor	Bob Kimbal	Javelin throw	3rd	
Men's	1953 Outdoor	Leo Long	Javelin throw	4th	
Men's	1953 Outdoor	Chuck Harlow	Javelin throw	8th	
Men's	1954 Outdoor	Gerry Wood	110 meters hurdles	4th	
Men's	1954 Outdoor	Al Cheney	Shot put	8th	
Men's	1954 Outdoor	Leo Long	Javelin throw	1st	
Men's	1954 Outdoor	John Bugge	Javelin throw	6th	
Men's	1954 Outdoor	Bob Kimball	Javelin throw	7th	
Men's	1955 Outdoor	Jim Luttrell	220 yards hurdles	5th	
Men's	1955 Outdoor	Bernie Nelson	110 meters hurdles	6th	
Men's	1955 Outdoor	Frank Herrmann	Long jump	3rd	
Men's	1955 Outdoor	John Bugge	Javelin throw	8th	
Men's	1956 Outdoor	Russ Ferguson	3000 meters steeplechase	6th	
Men's	1956 Outdoor	Frank Herrmann	Long jump	4th	
Men's	1956 Outdoor	Frank Herrmann	Triple jump	8th	
Men's	1956 Outdoor	Kirk Nieland	Javelin throw	5th	
Men's	1956 Outdoor	Hank Roldan	Javelin throw	8th	
Men's	1957 Outdoor	Chuck Cobb	110 meters hurdles	3rd	
Men's	1957 Outdoor	Phil Fehlen	High jump	5th	
Men's	1957 Outdoor	Fred Peters	Discus throw	2nd	
Men's	1957 Outdoor	Hank Roldan	Javelin throw	3rd	
Men's	1958 Outdoor	Chuck Cobb	110 meters hurdles	6th	
Men's	1958 Outdoor	John Kelly	Long jump	6th	
Men's	1959 Outdoor	Ernie Cunliffe	800 meters	3rd	
Men's	1959 Outdoor	John Kelly	Long jump	6th	
Men's	1959 Outdoor	John Kelly	Triple jump	2nd	
Men's	1960 Outdoor	Ernie Cunliffe	800 meters	3rd	
Men's	1960 Outdoor	John Kelly	Triple jump	3rd	
Men's	1960 Outdoor	Jerry Winters	Shot put	2nd	
Men's	1960 Outdoor	Don Bell	Discus throw	8th	
Men's	1961 Outdoor	Dan Moore	Long jump	7th	
Men's	1961 Outdoor	Dave Weill	Discus throw	3rd	
Men's	1961 Outdoor	Art Batchelder	Javelin throw	7th	
Men's	1962 Outdoor	Harry McCalla	3000 meters steeplechase	6th	
Men's	1962 Outdoor	Harry McCalla	5000 meters	6th	
Men's	1962 Outdoor	Phil White	Pole vault	5th	
Men's	1962 Outdoor	Dan Moore	Long jump	4th	
Men's	1962 Outdoor	Steve Cortright	Triple jump	5th	
Men's	1962 Outdoor	Dave Weill	Discus throw	1st	
Men's	1962 Outdoor	Dave Batchelder	Javelin throw	3rd	
Men's	1963 Outdoor	Larry Questad	100 meters	1st	
Men's	1963 Outdoor	Eric Frische	100 meters	7th	
Men's	1963 Outdoor	Steve Cortright	110 meters hurdles	2nd	
Men's	1963 Outdoor	Larry Questad	200 meters	2nd	
Men's	1963 Outdoor	Eric Frische	200 meters	6th	
Men's	1963 Outdoor	Weym Kirkland	5000 meters	4th	
Men's	1963 Outdoor	Paul Schlicke	5000 meters	7th	
Men's	1963 Outdoor	Steve Cortright	Triple jump	6th	
Men's	1963 Outdoor	Dave Weill	Discus throw	1st	
Men's	1964 Outdoor	Steve Cortright	110 meters hurdles	6th	
Men's	1965 Outdoor	Larry Questad	100 meters	6th	
Men's	1965 Outdoor	Eric Frische	4 × 100 meters relay	5th	
Men's	1965 Outdoor	Dale Rubin	4 × 100 meters relay	5th	
Men's	1965 Outdoor	Bob McIntyre	4 × 100 meters relay	5th	
Men's	1965 Outdoor	Bud Walsh	4 × 100 meters relay	5th	
Men's	1965 Outdoor	Bob Stoecker	Discus throw	1st	
Men's	1966 Outdoor	Jim Ward	400 meters	7th	
Men's	1966 Outdoor	Roger Cox	4 × 100 meters relay	6th	
Men's	1966 Outdoor	Jim Ward	4 × 100 meters relay	6th	
Men's	1966 Outdoor	Bud Walsh	4 × 100 meters relay	6th	
Men's	1966 Outdoor	Donn Forbes	4 × 100 meters relay	6th	
Men's	1966 Outdoor	Jim Eshelman	Pole vault	7th	
Men's	1966 Outdoor	Bud Walsh	Long jump	5th	
Men's	1966 Outdoor	Bob Stoeker	Discus throw	3rd	
Men's	1967 Outdoor	Bud Walsh	Long jump	7th	
Men's	1968 Outdoor	Greg Brock	10,000 meters	5th	
Men's	1968 Outdoor	Peter Boyce	High jump	3rd	
Men's	1968 Outdoor	Tom Colby	Javelin throw	3rd	
Men's	1970 Outdoor	Don Kardong	5000 meters	4th	
Men's	1970 Outdoor	Casey Carrigan	Pole vault	4th	
Men's	1970 Outdoor	Allen Meredith	Triple jump	7th	
Men's	1971 Outdoor	Randy White	400 meters hurdles	7th	
Men's	1971 Outdoor	Don Kardong	5000 meters	8th	
Men's	1974 Outdoor	Tony Sandoval	10,000 meters	8th	
Men's	1976 Outdoor	John Foster	110 meters hurdles	7th	
Men's	1976 Outdoor	James Lofton	Long jump	3rd	
Men's	1977 Indoor	James Lofton	Long jump	2nd	
Men's	1977 Outdoor	James Lofton	Long jump	3rd	
Men's	1977 Outdoor	Terry Albritton	Shot put	1st	
Men's	1978 Indoor	James Lofton	Long jump	2nd	
Men's	1978 Outdoor	James Lofton	Long jump	1st	
Men's	1980 Outdoor	Rick Buss	Hammer throw	3rd	
Men's	1980 Outdoor	Dave Thomson	Hammer throw	7th	
Men's	1981 Outdoor	Dave Thomson	Hammer throw	7th	
Women's	1982 Outdoor	Regina Jacobs	800 meters	4th	
Women's	1982 Outdoor	Ceci Hopp	3000 meters	1st	
Women's	1982 Outdoor	PattiSue Plumer	3000 meters	2nd	
Women's	1982 Outdoor	Kim Schnurpfeil	5000 meters	5th	
Women's	1982 Outdoor	Kim Schnurpfeil	10,000 meters	1st	
Women's	1982 Outdoor	Ann Locke	10,000 meters	7th	
Women's	1982 Outdoor	Carol Cady	Discus throw	4th	
Women's	1983 Indoor	PattiSue Plumer	Mile run	5th	
Women's	1983 Indoor	PattiSue Plumer	3000 meters	1st	
Women's	1983 Indoor	Alison Wiley	3000 meters	2nd	
Women's	1983 Indoor	Carol Cady	Shot put	2nd	
Women's	1983 Outdoor	Alison Wiley	3000 meters	1st	
Women's	1983 Outdoor	PattiSue Plumer	3000 meters	2nd	
Women's	1983 Outdoor	Carol Cady	Shot put	1st	
Women's	1983 Outdoor	Carol Cady	Discus throw	2nd	
Men's	1984 Indoor	Shaun Pickering	Weight throw	6th	
Women's	1984 Indoor	PattiSue Plumer	3000 meters	3rd	
Women's	1984 Indoor	Carol Cady	Shot put	4th	
Men's	1984 Outdoor	Shaun Pickering	Hammer throw	8th	
Women's	1984 Outdoor	PattiSue Plumer	3000 meters	2nd	
Women's	1984 Outdoor	Alison Wiley	3000 meters	8th	
Women's	1984 Outdoor	PattiSue Plumer	5000 meters	1st	
Women's	1984 Outdoor	Alison Wiley	5000 meters	2nd	
Women's	1984 Outdoor	Carol Cady	Shot put	2nd	
Women's	1984 Outdoor	Carol Cady	Discus throw	1st	
Men's	1985 Indoor	Shaun Pickering	Weight throw	6th	
Men's	1985 Outdoor	Jeff Atkinson	1500 meters	7th	
Men's	1985 Outdoor	Brian Masterson	Hammer throw	4th	
Women's	1985 Outdoor	Regina Jacobs	1500 meters	6th	
Women's	1985 Outdoor	Pam Dukes	Shot put	7th	
Women's	1985 Outdoor	Karen Nickerson	Discus throw	3rd	
Men's	1986 Outdoor	Jeff Atkinson	1500 meters	4th	
Men's	1986 Outdoor	Brian Marshall	High jump	4th	
Men's	1986 Outdoor	Jay Thorson	Decathlon	7th	
Women's	1986 Outdoor	Alison Wiley	5000 meters	5th	
Women's	1986 Outdoor	Lisa Bernhagen	High jump	4th	
Women's	1986 Outdoor	Pam Dukes	Shot put	2nd	
Women's	1986 Outdoor	Karen Nickerson	Discus throw	2nd	
Women's	1986 Outdoor	Pam Dukes	Discus throw	6th	
Women's	1986 Outdoor	Patty Purpur	Discus throw	8th	
Women's	1987 Indoor	Lisa Bernhagen	High jump	1st	
Women's	1987 Indoor	Pam Dukes	Shot put	1st	
Women's	1987 Outdoor	Patty Purpur	Shot put	8th	
Women's	1988 Indoor	Lisa Bernhagen	High jump	4th	
Women's	1988 Indoor	Patty Purpur	Shot put	6th	
Men's	1988 Outdoor	Marc Olesen	1500 meters	7th	
Men's	1988 Outdoor	Brian Marshall	High jump	4th	
Men's	1988 Outdoor	Glen Schneider	Discus throw	7th	
Women's	1988 Outdoor	Carol Gray	10,000 meters	6th	
Women's	1988 Outdoor	Lisa Bernhagen	High jump	2nd	
Women's	1988 Outdoor	Patty Purpur	Shot put	3rd	
Women's	1988 Outdoor	Patty Purpur	Discus throw	6th	
Women's	1988 Outdoor	Erica Wheeler	Javelin throw	2nd	
Women's	1989 Indoor	Lisa Bernhagen	High jump	2nd	
Women's	1989 Indoor	Patty Purpur	Shot put	4th	
Men's	1989 Outdoor	Brian Boggess	Shot put	7th	
Women's	1989 Outdoor	Patty Purpur	Shot put	2nd	
Women's	1989 Outdoor	Patty Purpur	Discus throw	7th	
Men's	1990 Outdoor	David Strang	800 meters	8th	
Women's	1990 Outdoor	Peggy Odita	Heptathlon	7th	
Women's	1991 Indoor	Chryste Gaines	55 meters	4th	
Men's	1991 Outdoor	David Strang	800 meters	7th	
Men's	1991 Outdoor	Marcus Hickerson	Long jump	4th	
Women's	1991 Outdoor	Chryste Gaines	100 meters	3rd	
Women's	1991 Outdoor	Jackie Edwards	Long jump	2nd	
Women's	1991 Outdoor	Debbie Malueg	Discus throw	6th	
Women's	1992 Indoor	Chryste Gaines	55 meters	1st	
Women's	1992 Indoor	Jackie Edwards	Long jump	1st	
Women's	1992 Indoor	Jackie Edwards	Triple jump	3rd	
Women's	1992 Outdoor	Chryste Gaines	100 meters	1st	
Women's	1992 Outdoor	Jackie Edwards	Long jump	1st	
Women's	1992 Outdoor	Jackie Edwards	Triple jump	2nd	
Men's	1993 Indoor	Gary Stolz	5000 meters	4th	
Women's	1993 Outdoor	Jen McCormick	Javelin throw	5th	
Men's	1994 Indoor	Rene Rodriguez	400 meters	8th	
Women's	1994 Indoor	Louise Watson	5000 meters	2nd	
Men's	1994 Outdoor	David Popejoy	Hammer throw	6th	
Women's	1994 Outdoor	Louise Watson	5000 meters	8th	
Women's	1994 Outdoor	Louise Watson	10,000 meters	3rd	
Women's	1994 Outdoor	Jen McCormick	Javelin throw	2nd	
Men's	1995 Indoor	Peter Swanson	Shot put	4th	
Men's	1995 Indoor	David Popejoy	Weight throw	7th	
Men's	1995 Indoor	Peter Swanson	Weight throw	8th	
Women's	1995 Indoor	Kortney Dunscombe	5000 meters	7th	
Women's	1995 Indoor	Dena Dey	Distance medley relay	6th	
Women's	1995 Indoor	Tyra Holt	Distance medley relay	6th	
Women's	1995 Indoor	Monal Chokshi	Distance medley relay	6th	
Women's	1995 Indoor	Sarna Renfro	Distance medley relay	6th	
Men's	1995 Outdoor	David Popejoy	Hammer throw	5th	
Women's	1995 Outdoor	Monal Chokshi	3000 meters	8th	
Women's	1996 Indoor	Mary Cobb	5000 meters	6th	
Women's	1996 Indoor	Dena Dey	Distance medley relay	5th	
Women's	1996 Indoor	Tyra Holt	Distance medley relay	5th	
Women's	1996 Indoor	Monal Chokshi	Distance medley relay	5th	
Women's	1996 Indoor	Mary Cobb	Distance medley relay	5th	
Women's	1996 Outdoor	Dena Dey	1500 meters	7th	
Women's	1996 Outdoor	Monal Chokshi	3000 meters	4th	
Women's	1996 Outdoor	Sarna Renfro	5000 meters	5th	
Men's	1997 Indoor	Jason Lunn	Mile run	3rd	
Men's	1997 Indoor	Rob Reeder	5000 meters	6th	
Women's	1997 Indoor	Tracye Lawyer	High jump	3rd	
Men's	1997 Outdoor	Jason Lunn	1500 meters	8th	
Men's	1997 Outdoor	Brent Hauser	5000 meters	6th	
Men's	1997 Outdoor	Brad Hauser	10,000 meters	2nd	
Men's	1997 Outdoor	Robert Reeder	10,000 meters	8th	
Men's	1997 Outdoor	Justin Strand	Hammer throw	4th	
Women's	1997 Outdoor	Mary Cobb	5000 meters	2nd	
Women's	1997 Outdoor	Sarna Renfro	5000 meters	5th	
Women's	1997 Outdoor	Tracye Lawyer	Heptathlon	3rd	
Men's	1998 Indoor	Jonathon Riley	Mile run	4th	
Men's	1998 Indoor	Gabe Jennings	3000 meters	4th	
Men's	1998 Indoor	Brad Hauser	5000 meters	1st	
Men's	1998 Indoor	Brent Hauser	5000 meters	4th	
Men's	1998 Indoor	Gabe Jennings	Distance medley relay	4th	
Men's	1998 Indoor	Jeff Allen	Distance medley relay	4th	
Men's	1998 Indoor	Jake Maas	Distance medley relay	4th	
Men's	1998 Indoor	Michael Stember	Distance medley relay	4th	
Men's	1998 Indoor	Toby Stevenson	Pole vault	7th	
Men's	1998 Indoor	Adam Connolly	Weight throw	4th	
Women's	1998 Indoor	Julia Stamps	3000 meters	5th	
Women's	1998 Indoor	Monal Chokshi	Distance medley relay	8th	
Women's	1998 Indoor	Heather Miller	Distance medley relay	8th	
Women's	1998 Indoor	Sara Moore	Distance medley relay	8th	
Women's	1998 Indoor	Sally Glynn	Distance medley relay	8th	
Women's	1998 Indoor	Melissa Feinstein	Pole vault	4th	
Men's	1998 Outdoor	Gabe Jennings	1500 meters	2nd	
Men's	1998 Outdoor	Brad Hauser	5000 meters	5th	
Men's	1998 Outdoor	Brad Hauser	10,000 meters	1st	
Men's	1998 Outdoor	Brent Hauser	10,000 meters	2nd	
Men's	1998 Outdoor	Nathan Nutter	10,000 meters	3rd	
Men's	1998 Outdoor	Toby Stevenson	Pole vault	1st	
Men's	1998 Outdoor	Adam Connolly	Hammer throw	5th	
Men's	1998 Outdoor	Justin Strand	Hammer throw	8th	
Women's	1998 Outdoor	Monal Chokshi	3000 meters	1st	
Women's	1998 Outdoor	Tracye Lawyer	High jump	6th	
Women's	1998 Outdoor	Melissa Feinstein	Pole vault	4th	
Women's	1998 Outdoor	Tracye Lawyer	Heptathlon	2nd	
Men's	1999 Indoor	Michael Stember	Mile run	5th	
Men's	1999 Indoor	Brad Hauser	3000 meters	5th	
Men's	1999 Indoor	Jonathon Riley	3000 meters	8th	
Men's	1999 Indoor	Brad Hauser	5000 meters	1st	
Men's	1999 Indoor	Brent Hauser	5000 meters	2nd	
Men's	1999 Indoor	Jason Balkman	5000 meters	5th	
Men's	1999 Indoor	Michael Stember	Distance medley relay	5th	
Men's	1999 Indoor	Jeff Allen	Distance medley relay	5th	
Men's	1999 Indoor	Mark Hassell	Distance medley relay	5th	
Men's	1999 Indoor	Jonathon Riley	Distance medley relay	5th	
Men's	1999 Indoor	Toby Stevenson	Pole vault	4th	
Men's	1999 Indoor	Adam Connolly	Weight throw	6th	
Women's	1999 Indoor	Sally Glynn	Mile run	7th	
Women's	1999 Indoor	Julia Stamps	3000 meters	8th	
Men's	1999 Outdoor	Jake Maas	1500 meters	7th	
Men's	1999 Outdoor	Brad Hauser	5000 meters	2nd	
Men's	1999 Outdoor	Brent Hauser	5000 meters	5th	
Men's	1999 Outdoor	Jason Balkman	5000 meters	8th	
Men's	1999 Outdoor	Nathan Nutter	10,000 meters	1st	
Men's	1999 Outdoor	Jason Balkman	10,000 meters	2nd	
Men's	1999 Outdoor	Brent Hauser	10,000 meters	3rd	
Men's	1999 Outdoor	Toby Stevenson	Pole vault	2nd	
Men's	1999 Outdoor	Adam Connolly	Hammer throw	4th	
Women's	1999 Outdoor	Sally Glynn	3000 meters	5th	
Women's	1999 Outdoor	Julia Stamps	3000 meters	6th	
Women's	1999 Outdoor	Tracye Lawyer	Heptathlon	1st	
Men's	2000 Indoor	Gabe Jennings	Mile run	1st	
Men's	2000 Indoor	Michael Stember	Mile run	2nd	
Men's	2000 Indoor	Brent Hauser	3000 meters	6th	
Men's	2000 Indoor	Gabe Jennings	3000 meters	7th	
Men's	2000 Indoor	Brent Hauser	5000 meters	2nd	
Men's	2000 Indoor	Jason Balkman	5000 meters	6th	
Men's	2000 Indoor	Gabe Jennings	Distance medley relay	1st	
Men's	2000 Indoor	Evan Kelty	Distance medley relay	1st	
Men's	2000 Indoor	Michael Stember	Distance medley relay	1st	
Men's	2000 Indoor	Jonathon Riley	Distance medley relay	1st	
Men's	2000 Indoor	Toby Stevenson	Pole vault	2nd	
Women's	2000 Indoor	Lindsay Hyatt	800 meters	7th	
Women's	2000 Indoor	Lauren Fleshman	3000 meters	6th	
Women's	2000 Indoor	Sally Glynn	Distance medley relay	1st	
Women's	2000 Indoor	Jayna Smith	Distance medley relay	1st	
Women's	2000 Indoor	Lindsay Hyatt	Distance medley relay	1st	
Women's	2000 Indoor	Lauren Fleshman	Distance medley relay	1st	
Men's	2000 Outdoor	Michael Stember	800 meters	4th	
Men's	2000 Outdoor	Gabe Jennings	1500 meters	1st	
Men's	2000 Outdoor	Michael Stember	1500 meters	2nd	
Men's	2000 Outdoor	Brad Hauser	5000 meters	1st	
Men's	2000 Outdoor	Brent Hauser	5000 meters	4th	
Men's	2000 Outdoor	Jonathon Riley	5000 meters	6th	
Men's	2000 Outdoor	Brad Hauser	10,000 meters	1st	
Men's	2000 Outdoor	Jason Balkman	10,000 meters	2nd	
Men's	2000 Outdoor	Brent Hauser	10,000 meters	4th	
Men's	2000 Outdoor	Toby Stevenson	Pole vault	2nd	
Women's	2000 Outdoor	Lauren Fleshman	1500 meters	5th	
Women's	2000 Outdoor	Sally Glynn	3000 meters	5th	
Men's	2001 Indoor	Gabe Jennings	Mile run	3rd	
Men's	2001 Indoor	Jonathon Riley	3000 meters	3rd	
Men's	2001 Indoor	Jonathon Riley	5000 meters	4th	
Men's	2001 Indoor	Donald Sage	Distance medley relay	1st	
Men's	2001 Indoor	Mark Hassell	Distance medley relay	1st	
Men's	2001 Indoor	Jonathan Stevens	Distance medley relay	1st	
Men's	2001 Indoor	Gabe Jennings	Distance medley relay	1st	
Men's	2001 Indoor	Michael Ponikvar	High jump	7th	
Women's	2001 Indoor	Lauren Fleshman	Mile run	3rd	
Men's	2001 Outdoor	Michael Stember	800 meters	4th	
Men's	2001 Outdoor	Gabe Jennings	1500 meters	2nd	
Men's	2001 Outdoor	Michael Stember	1500 meters	4th	
Men's	2001 Outdoor	Don Sage	1500 meters	5th	
Men's	2001 Outdoor	Jonathon Riley	5000 meters	1st	
Men's	2001 Outdoor	Grant Robison	5000 meters	7th	
Men's	2001 Outdoor	Michael Ponikvar	High jump	8th	
Men's	2001 Outdoor	Omer Inan	Discus throw	8th	
Women's	2001 Outdoor	Sally Glynn	1500 meters	2nd	
Women's	2001 Outdoor	Ashley Couper	1500 meters	6th	
Women's	2001 Outdoor	Lauren Fleshman	5000 meters	1st	
Women's	2001 Outdoor	Sally Glynn	5000 meters	4th	
Women's	2001 Outdoor	Kathleen Donoghue	Pole vault	8th	
Men's	2002 Indoor	Grant Robison	3000 meters	6th	
Men's	2002 Indoor	Louis Luchini	5000 meters	8th	
Men's	2002 Indoor	Donald Sage	Distance medley relay	7th	
Men's	2002 Indoor	Curtis Goehring	Distance medley relay	7th	
Men's	2002 Indoor	Mark Hassell	Distance medley relay	7th	
Men's	2002 Indoor	Grant Robison	Distance medley relay	7th	
Women's	2002 Indoor	Malindi Elmore	Mile run	4th	
Women's	2002 Indoor	Lauren Fleshman	3000 meters	1st	
Women's	2002 Indoor	Stanford Carlucci	Distance medley relay	3rd	
Women's	2002 Indoor	Christine Moschella	Distance medley relay	3rd	
Women's	2002 Indoor	Lindsay Hyatt	Distance medley relay	3rd	
Women's	2002 Indoor	Lauren Fleshman	Distance medley relay	3rd	
Women's	2002 Indoor	Jillian Camarena	Shot put	5th	
Men's	2002 Outdoor	Donald Sage	1500 meters	1st	
Men's	2002 Outdoor	Grant Robison	1500 meters	8th	
Men's	2002 Outdoor	Jesse Thomas	3000 meters steeplechase	8th	
Men's	2002 Outdoor	Jonathon Riley	5000 meters	7th	
Men's	2002 Outdoor	Louis Lucchini	10,000 meters	5th	
Men's	2002 Outdoor	Adam Tenforde	10,000 meters	7th	
Men's	2002 Outdoor	Michael Ponikvar	High jump	3rd	
Women's	2002 Outdoor	Maurica Carlucci	1500 meters	5th	
Women's	2002 Outdoor	Lauren Fleshman	5000 meters	1st	
Women's	2002 Outdoor	Kathleen Donoghue	Pole vault	4th	
Women's	2002 Outdoor	Jillian Camarena	Shot put	3rd	
Men's	2003 Indoor	Louis Luchini	3000 meters	4th	
Men's	2003 Indoor	Grant Robison	3000 meters	8th	
Men's	2003 Indoor	Louis Luchini	5000 meters	5th	
Men's	2003 Indoor	Seth Hejny	Distance medley relay	2nd	
Men's	2003 Indoor	Nick Sebes	Distance medley relay	2nd	
Men's	2003 Indoor	Evan Fox	Distance medley relay	2nd	
Men's	2003 Indoor	Grant Robison	Distance medley relay	2nd	
Women's	2003 Indoor	Malindi Elmore	Mile run	8th	
Women's	2003 Indoor	Lauren Fleshman	3000 meters	2nd	
Women's	2003 Indoor	Alicia Craig	3000 meters	8th	
Women's	2003 Indoor	Alicia Craig	5000 meters	3rd	
Women's	2003 Indoor	Lauren Fleshman	5000 meters	4th	
Women's	2003 Indoor	Malindi Elmore	Distance medley relay	6th	
Women's	2003 Indoor	Christine Moschella	Distance medley relay	6th	
Women's	2003 Indoor	Katie Hotchkiss	Distance medley relay	6th	
Women's	2003 Indoor	Jeane Goff	Distance medley relay	6th	
Women's	2003 Indoor	Jillian Camarena	Shot put	2nd	
Men's	2003 Outdoor	Grant Robison	1500 meters	1st	
Men's	2003 Outdoor	Louis Luchini	5000 meters	2nd	
Men's	2003 Outdoor	Seth Hejny	5000 meters	4th	
Men's	2003 Outdoor	Ian Dobson	10,000 meters	5th	
Men's	2003 Outdoor	Adam Tenforde	10,000 meters	7th	
Men's	2003 Outdoor	Nick Welihozkiy	Hammer throw	8th	
Women's	2003 Outdoor	Malindi Elmore	1500 meters	8th	
Women's	2003 Outdoor	Lauren Fleshman	5000 meters	1st	
Women's	2003 Outdoor	Alicia Craig	10,000 meters	1st	
Women's	2003 Outdoor	Jillian Camarena	Shot put	3rd	
Men's	2004 Indoor	Ian Dobson	3000 meters	5th	
Men's	2004 Indoor	Ian Dobson	5000 meters	2nd	
Women's	2004 Indoor	Sara Bei	3000 meters	2nd	
Women's	2004 Indoor	Alicia Craig	5000 meters	2nd	
Women's	2004 Indoor	Katy Trotter	Distance medley relay	2nd	
Women's	2004 Indoor	Ashley Freeman	Distance medley relay	2nd	
Women's	2004 Indoor	Chinny Offor	Distance medley relay	2nd	
Women's	2004 Indoor	Sara Bei	Distance medley relay	2nd	
Women's	2004 Indoor	Jillian Camarena	Shot put	3rd	
Men's	2004 Outdoor	Donald Sage	1500 meters	3rd	
Men's	2004 Outdoor	Ian Dobson	3000 meters steeplechase	3rd	
Men's	2004 Outdoor	Louis Luchini	5000 meters	4th	
Women's	2004 Outdoor	Sara Bei	5000 meters	2nd	
Women's	2004 Outdoor	Alicia Craig	10,000 meters	1st	
Women's	2004 Outdoor	Janice Davis	4 × 100 meters relay	8th	
Women's	2004 Outdoor	Nashonme Johnson	4 × 100 meters relay	8th	
Women's	2004 Outdoor	Christine Moschella	4 × 100 meters relay	8th	
Women's	2004 Outdoor	Ashley Purnell	4 × 100 meters relay	8th	
Women's	2004 Outdoor	Jillian Camarena	Shot put	2nd	
Men's	2005 Indoor	Ian Dobson	5000 meters	1st	
Men's	2005 Indoor	Russell Brown	Distance medley relay	4th	
Men's	2005 Indoor	Joaquin Chapa	Distance medley relay	4th	
Men's	2005 Indoor	Nick Sebes	Distance medley relay	4th	
Men's	2005 Indoor	Michael Garcia	Distance medley relay	4th	
Women's	2005 Indoor	Katy Trotter	3000 meters	5th	
Women's	2005 Indoor	Alicia Craig	5000 meters	4th	
Women's	2005 Indoor	Katy Trotter	Distance medley relay	3rd	
Women's	2005 Indoor	Christine Moschelle	Distance medley relay	3rd	
Women's	2005 Indoor	Chinny Offor	Distance medley relay	3rd	
Women's	2005 Indoor	Sara Bei	Distance medley relay	3rd	
Women's	2005 Indoor	Erica McLain	Long jump	8th	
Women's	2005 Indoor	Erica McLain	Triple jump	2nd	
Men's	2005 Outdoor	Ryan Hall	5000 meters	1st	
Men's	2005 Outdoor	Ian Dobson	5000 meters	2nd	
Men's	2005 Outdoor	Michael Robertson	Discus throw	1st	
Women's	2005 Outdoor	Arianna Lambie	1500 meters	3rd	
Women's	2005 Outdoor	Sara Bei	5000 meters	2nd	
Women's	2005 Outdoor	Teresa McWalters	5000 meters	3rd	
Women's	2005 Outdoor	Christine Moschella	4 × 400 meters relay	6th	
Women's	2005 Outdoor	Janice Davis	4 × 400 meters relay	6th	
Women's	2005 Outdoor	Ashley Freeman	4 × 400 meters relay	6th	
Women's	2005 Outdoor	Nashonme Johnson	4 × 400 meters relay	6th	
Women's	2005 Outdoor	Erica McLain	Triple jump	3rd	
Men's	2006 Indoor	Russell Brown	Mile run	8th	
Men's	2006 Indoor	Russell Brown	Distance medley relay	8th	
Men's	2006 Indoor	Michael Garcia	Distance medley relay	8th	
Men's	2006 Indoor	Joaquin Chapa	Distance medley relay	8th	
Men's	2006 Indoor	Garrett Heath	Distance medley relay	8th	
Women's	2006 Indoor	Chauntae Bayne	60 meters	8th	
Women's	2006 Indoor	Chauntae Bayne	200 meters	3rd	
Women's	2006 Indoor	Janice Davis	200 meters	8th	
Women's	2006 Indoor	Arianna Lambie	Mile run	4th	
Women's	2006 Indoor	Arianna Lambie	3000 meters	3rd	
Women's	2006 Indoor	Teresa McWalters	3000 meters	5th	
Women's	2006 Indoor	Amanda Trotter	Distance medley relay	2nd	
Women's	2006 Indoor	Keisha Gaines	Distance medley relay	2nd	
Women's	2006 Indoor	Ashley Freeman	Distance medley relay	2nd	
Women's	2006 Indoor	Arianna Lambie	Distance medley relay	2nd	
Women's	2006 Indoor	Erica McLain	Long jump	6th	
Women's	2006 Indoor	Erica McLain	Triple jump	7th	
Men's	2006 Outdoor	Russell Brown	1500 meters	5th	
Men's	2006 Outdoor	Jon Pierce	3000 meters steeplechase	7th	
Women's	2006 Outdoor	Janice Davis	100 meters	6th	
Women's	2006 Outdoor	Ashley Freeman	800 meters	7th	
Women's	2006 Outdoor	Katy Trotter	5000 meters	8th	
Women's	2006 Outdoor	Erica McLain	Long jump	3rd	
Women's	2006 Outdoor	Erica McLain	Triple jump	2nd	
Men's	2007 Indoor	Russell Brown	Mile run	2nd	
Men's	2007 Indoor	Garrett Heath	Mile run	4th	
Men's	2007 Indoor	Garrett Heath	Distance medley relay	1st	
Men's	2007 Indoor	Zach Chandy	Distance medley relay	1st	
Men's	2007 Indoor	Michael Garcia	Distance medley relay	1st	
Men's	2007 Indoor	Russell Brown	Distance medley relay	1st	
Men's	2007 Indoor	Josh Hustedt	Heptathlon	4th	
Women's	2007 Indoor	Arianna Lambie	3000 meters	3rd	
Women's	2007 Indoor	Arianna Lambie	5000 meters	2nd	
Women's	2007 Indoor	Erica McLain	Triple jump	1st	
Men's	2007 Outdoor	Russell Brown	1500 meters	3rd	
Men's	2007 Outdoor	Garrett Heath	1500 meters	7th	
Men's	2007 Outdoor	Graeme Hoste	Pole vault	4th	
Men's	2007 Outdoor	Michael Robertson	Discus throw	2nd	
Women's	2007 Outdoor	Arianna Lambie	1500 meters	3rd	
Women's	2007 Outdoor	Teresa McWalters	5000 meters	6th	
Women's	2007 Outdoor	Erica McLain	Long jump	3rd	
Women's	2007 Outdoor	Erica McLain	Triple jump	2nd	
Men's	2008 Indoor	Garrett Heath	Mile run	4th	
Men's	2008 Indoor	Hakon DeVries	Distance medley relay	4th	
Men's	2008 Indoor	Andrew Dargie	Distance medley relay	4th	
Men's	2008 Indoor	Jacob Evans	Distance medley relay	4th	
Men's	2008 Indoor	Garrett Heath	Distance medley relay	4th	
Men's	2008 Indoor	Graeme Hoste	Pole vault	4th	
Men's	2008 Indoor	Josh Hustedt	Heptathlon	2nd	
Women's	2008 Indoor	Arianna Lambie	3000 meters	3rd	
Women's	2008 Indoor	Lauren Centrowitz	3000 meters	4th	
Women's	2008 Indoor	Lauren Centrowitz	Distance medley relay	3rd	
Women's	2008 Indoor	Idara Otu	Distance medley relay	3rd	
Women's	2008 Indoor	Alicia Follmar	Distance medley relay	3rd	
Women's	2008 Indoor	Arianna Lambie	Distance medley relay	3rd	
Women's	2008 Indoor	Erica McLain	Long jump	4th	
Women's	2008 Indoor	Erica McLain	Triple jump	1st	
Men's	2008 Outdoor	Garrett Heath	1500 meters	6th	
Women's	2008 Outdoor	Lindsay Allen	3000 meters steeplechase	4th	
Women's	2008 Outdoor	Teresa McWalters	5000 meters	4th	
Women's	2008 Outdoor	Alex Gits	10,000 meters	3rd	
Women's	2008 Outdoor	Erica McLain	Long jump	4th	
Women's	2008 Outdoor	Erica McLain	Triple jump	1st	
Men's	2009 Indoor	Myles Bradley	60 meters hurdles	5th	
Men's	2009 Indoor	Elliott Heath	3000 meters	3rd	
Men's	2009 Indoor	Chris Derrick	3000 meters	5th	
Men's	2009 Indoor	Chris Derrick	5000 meters	4th	
Women's	2009 Indoor	Lauren Centrowitz	3000 meters	3rd	
Women's	2009 Indoor	Laurynne Chetelat	3000 meters	7th	
Women's	2009 Indoor	Alicia Follmar	3000 meters	8th	
Women's	2009 Indoor	Alicia Follmar	Distance medley relay	4th	
Women's	2009 Indoor	Idara Otu	Distance medley relay	4th	
Women's	2009 Indoor	Maria Lattanzi	Distance medley relay	4th	
Women's	2009 Indoor	Lauren Centrowitz	Distance medley relay	4th	
Men's	2009 Outdoor	Myles Bradley	110 meters hurdles	4th	
Men's	2009 Outdoor	Garrett Heath	1500 meters	2nd	
Men's	2009 Outdoor	Chris Derrick	5000 meters	3rd	
Men's	2009 Outdoor	Elliott Heath	5000 meters	5th	
Men's	2009 Outdoor	Jacob Riley	10,000 meters	8th	
Men's	2009 Outdoor	Daniel Scharer	Discus throw	3rd	
Women's	2009 Outdoor	Lauren Centrowitz	1500 meters	3rd	
Men's	2010 Indoor	Dylan Ferris	Mile run	8th	
Men's	2010 Indoor	Elliott Heath	5000 meters	7th	
Women's	2010 Indoor	Katerina Stefanidi	Pole vault	5th	
Men's	2010 Outdoor	Amaechi Morton	400 meters hurdles	3rd	
Men's	2010 Outdoor	John Sullivan	3000 meters steeplechase	4th	
Men's	2010 Outdoor	Chris Derrick	5000 meters	4th	
Men's	2010 Outdoor	Jacob Riley	10,000 meters	3rd	
Women's	2010 Outdoor	Kathy Kroeger	5000 meters	5th	
Women's	2010 Outdoor	Stephanie Marcy	10,000 meters	8th	
Women's	2010 Outdoor	Katerina Stefanidi	Pole vault	4th	
Women's	2010 Outdoor	Arantxa King	Long jump	2nd	
Men's	2011 Indoor	Amaechi Morton	400 meters	5th	
Men's	2011 Indoor	Elliott Heath	3000 meters	1st	
Men's	2011 Indoor	Elliott Heath	5000 meters	5th	
Men's	2011 Indoor	Chris Derrick	5000 meters	8th	
Women's	2011 Indoor	Stephanie Marcy	3000 meters	7th	
Women's	2011 Indoor	Katerina Stefanidi	Pole vault	2nd	
Women's	2011 Indoor	Whitney Liehr	Triple jump	5th	
Men's	2011 Outdoor	Amaechi Morton	400 meters hurdles	2nd	
Men's	2011 Outdoor	John Sullivan	3000 meters steeplechase	4th	
Men's	2011 Outdoor	Benjamin Johnson	3000 meters steeplechase	7th	
Men's	2011 Outdoor	Chris Derrick	5000 meters	4th	
Men's	2011 Outdoor	Chris Derrick	10,000 meters	4th	
Men's	2011 Outdoor	Jacob Riley	10,000 meters	5th	
Women's	2011 Outdoor	Kathy Kroeger	5000 meters	5th	
Women's	2011 Outdoor	Stephanie Marcy	10,000 meters	6th	
Women's	2011 Outdoor	Katerina Stefanidi	Pole vault	3rd	
Women's	2011 Outdoor	Whitney Liehr	Triple jump	5th	
Women's	2011 Outdoor	Eda Karesin	Javelin throw	2nd	
Men's	2012 Indoor	Chris Derrick	3000 meters	2nd	
Men's	2012 Indoor	Chris Derrick	5000 meters	2nd	
Men's	2012 Indoor	Michael Atchoo	Distance medley relay	4th	
Men's	2012 Indoor	Amaechi Morton	Distance medley relay	4th	
Men's	2012 Indoor	Luke Lefebure	Distance medley relay	4th	
Men's	2012 Indoor	Elliott Heath	Distance medley relay	4th	
Women's	2012 Indoor	Kathy Kroeger	3000 meters	6th	
Women's	2012 Indoor	Katerina Stefanidi	Pole vault	3rd	
Women's	2012 Indoor	Karynn Dunn	Long jump	4th	
Women's	2012 Indoor	Arantxa King	Long jump	5th	
Men's	2012 Outdoor	Amaechi Morton	400 meters hurdles	1st	
Men's	2012 Outdoor	Chris Derrick	10,000 meters	3rd	
Women's	2012 Outdoor	Katie Nelms	100 meters hurdles	8th	
Women's	2012 Outdoor	Kathy Kroeger	5000 meters	7th	
Women's	2012 Outdoor	Katerina Stefanidi	Pole vault	1st	
Women's	2012 Outdoor	Karynn Dunn	Long jump	5th	
Women's	2012 Outdoor	Brianna Bain	Javelin throw	2nd	
Men's	2013 Indoor	Tyler Stutzman	Mile run	4th	
Men's	2013 Indoor	Michael Atchoo	Mile run	8th	
Men's	2013 Indoor	Tyler Stutzman	Distance medley relay	8th	
Men's	2013 Indoor	Spencer Chase	Distance medley relay	8th	
Men's	2013 Indoor	Luke Lefebure	Distance medley relay	8th	
Men's	2013 Indoor	Michael Atchoo	Distance medley relay	8th	
Women's	2013 Outdoor	Kori Carter	100 meters hurdles	2nd	
Women's	2013 Outdoor	Kori Carter	400 meters hurdles	1st	
Women's	2013 Outdoor	Justine Fedronic	800 meters	3rd	
Women's	2013 Outdoor	Amy Weissenbach	800 meters	6th	
Women's	2013 Outdoor	Brianna Bain	Javelin throw	3rd	
Men's	2014 Indoor	Erik Olson	3000 meters	7th	
Men's	2014 Indoor	Joe Rosa	5000 meters	5th	
Men's	2014 Indoor	Marco Bertolotti	Distance medley relay	1st	
Men's	2014 Indoor	Steven Solomon	Distance medley relay	1st	
Men's	2014 Indoor	Luke Lefebure	Distance medley relay	1st	
Men's	2014 Indoor	Michael Atchoo	Distance medley relay	1st	
Women's	2014 Indoor	Aisling Cuffe	3000 meters	7th	
Women's	2014 Indoor	Aisling Cuffe	5000 meters	2nd	
Women's	2014 Indoor	Kathy Kroeger	5000 meters	3rd	
Women's	2014 Indoor	Amy Weissenbach	Distance medley relay	2nd	
Women's	2014 Indoor	Kristyn Williams	Distance medley relay	2nd	
Women's	2014 Indoor	Claudia Saunders	Distance medley relay	2nd	
Women's	2014 Indoor	Justine Fedronic	Distance medley relay	2nd	
Men's	2014 Outdoor	Luke Lefebure	800 meters	6th	
Men's	2014 Outdoor	Michael Atchoo	1500 meters	8th	
Men's	2014 Outdoor	Joe Rosa	5000 meters	7th	
Men's	2014 Outdoor	Jim Rosa	10,000 meters	6th	
Women's	2014 Outdoor	Claudia Saunders	800 meters	2nd	
Women's	2014 Outdoor	Amy Weissenbach	800 meters	6th	
Women's	2014 Outdoor	Aisling Cuffe	5000 meters	2nd	
Women's	2015 Indoor	Elise Cranny	3000 meters	2nd	
Women's	2015 Indoor	Jessica McClain	3000 meters	5th	
Women's	2015 Indoor	Jessica McClain	Distance medley relay	2nd	
Women's	2015 Indoor	Olivia Baker	Distance medley relay	2nd	
Women's	2015 Indoor	Claudia Saunders	Distance medley relay	2nd	
Women's	2015 Indoor	Elise Cranny	Distance medley relay	2nd	
Men's	2015 Outdoor	Sean McGorty	5000 meters	8th	
Men's	2015 Outdoor	Dylan Duvio	Pole vault	3rd	
Women's	2015 Outdoor	Claudia Saunders	800 meters	2nd	
Women's	2015 Outdoor	Jessica McClain	5000 meters	3rd	
Women's	2015 Outdoor	Valarie Allman	Discus throw	5th	
Men's	2016 Indoor	Sean McGorty	3000 meters	2nd	
Men's	2016 Indoor	Thomas Coyle	Distance medley relay	4th	
Men's	2016 Indoor	Jackson Shumway	Distance medley relay	4th	
Men's	2016 Indoor	Justin Brinkley	Distance medley relay	4th	
Men's	2016 Indoor	Sean McGorty	Distance medley relay	4th	
Men's	2016 Indoor	Harrison Williams	Heptathlon	4th	
Women's	2016 Indoor	Olivia Baker	800 meters	3rd	
Women's	2016 Indoor	Elise Cranny	Distance medley relay	3rd	
Women's	2016 Indoor	Kristyn Williams	Distance medley relay	3rd	
Women's	2016 Indoor	Malika Waschmann	Distance medley relay	3rd	
Women's	2016 Indoor	Rebecca Mehra	Distance medley relay	3rd	
Men's	2016 Outdoor	Sean McGorty	5000 meters	2nd	
Men's	2016 Outdoor	Grant Fisher	5000 meters	6th	
Women's	2016 Outdoor	Olivia Baker	800 meters	2nd	
Women's	2016 Outdoor	Claudia Saunders	800 meters	4th	
Women's	2016 Outdoor	Elise Cranny	1500 meters	2nd	
Women's	2016 Outdoor	Valarie Allman	Discus throw	3rd	
Women's	2016 Outdoor	Mackenzie Little	Javelin throw	7th	
Men's	2017 Indoor	Harrison Williams	Heptathlon	6th	
Women's	2017 Indoor	Olivia Baker	800 meters	7th	
Women's	2017 Indoor	Vanessa Fraser	3000 meters	5th	
Women's	2017 Indoor	Vanessa Fraser	Distance medley relay	2nd	
Women's	2017 Indoor	Missy Mongiovi	Distance medley relay	2nd	
Women's	2017 Indoor	Malika Waschmann	Distance medley relay	2nd	
Women's	2017 Indoor	Elise Cranny	Distance medley relay	2nd	
Men's	2017 Outdoor	Grant Fisher	5000 meters	1st	
Women's	2017 Outdoor	Olivia Baker	800 meters	8th	
Women's	2017 Outdoor	Rebecca Mehra	1500 meters	6th	
Women's	2017 Outdoor	Christina Aragon	1500 meters	7th	
Women's	2017 Outdoor	Fiona O'Keeffe	5000 meters	5th	
Women's	2017 Outdoor	Mackenzie Little	Javelin throw	4th	
Men's	2018 Indoor	Grant Fisher	3000 meters	4th	
Men's	2018 Indoor	Sean McGorty	Distance medley relay	4th	
Men's	2018 Indoor	Julian Body	Distance medley relay	4th	
Men's	2018 Indoor	Brandon McGorty	Distance medley relay	4th	
Men's	2018 Indoor	Grant Fisher	Distance medley relay	4th	
Women's	2018 Indoor	Olivia Baker	800 meters	8th	
Women's	2018 Indoor	Elise Cranny	Mile run	5th	
Women's	2018 Indoor	Vanessa Fraser	3000 meters	4th	
Women's	2018 Indoor	Christina Aragon	3000 meters	7th	
Women's	2018 Indoor	Vanessa Fraser	Distance medley relay	2nd	
Women's	2018 Indoor	Missy Mongiovi	Distance medley relay	2nd	
Women's	2018 Indoor	Elise Cranny	Distance medley relay	2nd	
Women's	2018 Indoor	Christina Aragon	Distance medley relay	2nd	
Women's	2018 Indoor	Lena Giger	Shot put	6th	
Women's	2018 Indoor	Valarie Allman	Weight throw	8th	
Men's	2018 Outdoor	Steven Fahy	3000 meters steeplechase	3rd	
Men's	2018 Outdoor	Sean McGorty	5000 meters	1st	
Men's	2018 Outdoor	Grant Fisher	5000 meters	3rd	
Men's	2018 Outdoor	Frank Kurtz	4 × 400 meters relay	8th	
Men's	2018 Outdoor	Julian Body	4 × 400 meters relay	8th	
Men's	2018 Outdoor	Gabe Navarro	4 × 400 meters relay	8th	
Men's	2018 Outdoor	Isaiah Brandt-Sims	4 × 400 meters relay	8th	
Men's	2018 Outdoor	Trevor Danielson	Javelin throw	4th	
Women's	2018 Outdoor	Olivia Baker	800 meters	5th	
Women's	2018 Outdoor	Elise Cranny	1500 meters	3rd	
Women's	2018 Outdoor	Christina Aragon	1500 meters	4th	
Women's	2018 Outdoor	Vanessa Fraser	5000 meters	4th	
Women's	2018 Outdoor	Lena Giger	Shot put	3rd	
Women's	2018 Outdoor	Valarie Allman	Discus throw	3rd	
Women's	2018 Outdoor	Valarie Allman	Hammer throw	8th	
Women's	2018 Outdoor	Mackenzie Little	Javelin throw	1st	
Women's	2018 Outdoor	Jenna Gray	Javelin throw	2nd	
Men's	2019 Indoor	Grant Fisher	3000 meters	2nd	
Men's	2019 Indoor	Alex Ostberg	3000 meters	5th	
Men's	2019 Indoor	Alex Ostberg	Distance medley relay	2nd	
Men's	2019 Indoor	Isaiah Brandt-Sims	Distance medley relay	2nd	
Men's	2019 Indoor	Isaac Cortes	Distance medley relay	2nd	
Men's	2019 Indoor	Grant Fisher	Distance medley relay	2nd	
Men's	2019 Indoor	Harrison Williams	Heptathlon	1st	
Women's	2019 Indoor	Fiona O'Keeffe	5000 meters	3rd	
Women's	2019 Indoor	Lena Giger	Shot put	2nd	
Men's	2019 Outdoor	Steven Fahy	3000 meters steeplechase	1st	
Men's	2019 Outdoor	Grant Fisher	5000 meters	2nd	
Men's	2019 Outdoor	Thomas Ratcliffe	5000 meters	3rd	
Men's	2019 Outdoor	Harrison Williams	Decathlon	2nd	
Women's	2019 Outdoor	Ella Donaghu	1500 meters	6th	
Women's	2019 Outdoor	Fiona O'Keeffe	5000 meters	7th	
Women's	2019 Outdoor	Mackenzie Little	Javelin throw	1st	
Women's	2019 Outdoor	Jenna Gray	Javelin throw	4th	
Men's	2021 Outdoor	Ky Robinson	3000 meters steeplechase	6th	
Men's	2021 Outdoor	Charles Hicks	10,000 meters	7th	
Women's	2021 Outdoor	Ella Donaghu	1500 meters	3rd	
Women's	2021 Outdoor	Christina Aragon	1500 meters	8th	
Women's	2021 Outdoor	Julia Heymach	5000 meters	6th	
Women's	2021 Outdoor	Virginia Miller	Javelin throw	7th	
Men's	2022 Indoor	Charles Hicks	3000 meters	3rd	
Men's	2022 Indoor	Cole Sprout	3000 meters	8th	
Men's	2022 Indoor	Ky Robinson	5000 meters	2nd	
Men's	2022 Indoor	Cole Sprout	5000 meters	5th	
Women's	2022 Indoor	Julia Heymach	Mile run	7th	
Women's	2022 Indoor	Christina Aragon	Distance medley relay	2nd	
Women's	2022 Indoor	Samantha Thomas	Distance medley relay	2nd	
Women's	2022 Indoor	Ellie Deligianni	Distance medley relay	2nd	
Women's	2022 Indoor	Julia Heymach	Distance medley relay	2nd	
Men's	2022 Outdoor	Udodi Onwuzurike	200 meters	3rd	
Men's	2022 Outdoor	Ky Robinson	5000 meters	4th	
Men's	2022 Outdoor	Cole Sprout	10,000 meters	4th	
Men's	2022 Outdoor	Charles Hicks	10,000 meters	6th	
Men's	2022 Outdoor	Keyshawn King	Triple jump	4th	
Women's	2022 Outdoor	Christina Aragon	1500 meters	3rd	
Women's	2022 Outdoor	Julia Heymach	1500 meters	5th	
Women's	2022 Outdoor	Virginia Miller	Javelin throw	7th	
Women's	2022 Outdoor	Allie Jones	Heptathlon	4th	
Men's	2023 Indoor	Udodi Onwuzurike	200 meters	5th	
Men's	2023 Indoor	Ky Robinson	5000 meters	7th	
Men's	2023 Indoor	Garrett Brown	Pole vault	8th	
Women's	2023 Indoor	Roisin Willis	800 meters	1st	
Women's	2023 Indoor	Juliette Whittaker	800 meters	2nd	
Women's	2023 Indoor	Melissa Tanaka	Distance medley relay	1st	
Women's	2023 Indoor	Maya Valmon	Distance medley relay	1st	
Women's	2023 Indoor	Roisin Willis	Distance medley relay	1st	
Women's	2023 Indoor	Juliette Whittaker	Distance medley relay	1st	
Women's	2023 Indoor	Alyssa Jones	Long jump	4th	
Men's	2023 Outdoor	Udodi Onwuzurike	100 meters	6th	
Men's	2023 Outdoor	Udodi Onwuzurike	200 meters	1st	
Men's	2023 Outdoor	Ky Robinson	5000 meters	1st	
Men's	2023 Outdoor	Charles Hicks	5000 meters	6th	
Men's	2023 Outdoor	Ky Robinson	10,000 meters	1st	
Men's	2023 Outdoor	Charles Hicks	10,000 meters	2nd	
Women's	2023 Outdoor	Roisin Willis	800 meters	4th	
Women's	2023 Outdoor	Alyssa Jones	Long jump	2nd	
Men's	2024 Indoor	Ky Robinson	3000 meters	5th	
Men's	2024 Indoor	Ky Robinson	5000 meters	3rd	
Women's	2024 Indoor	Juliette Whittaker	800 meters	1st	
Women's	2024 Indoor	Alyssa Jones	Long jump	3rd	
Men's	2024 Outdoor	Ky Robinson	5000 meters	3rd	
Women's	2024 Outdoor	Juliette Whittaker	800 meters	1st	
Women's	2024 Outdoor	Roisin Willis	800 meters	2nd	
Women's	2024 Outdoor	Alyssa Jones	Long jump	3rd	

== See also ==
- Category:Stanford Cardinal men's track and field athletes (75)
- Category:Stanford Cardinal women's track and field athletes (39)
