= 2002 NCAA Division I cross country championships =

2002 cross-country running meet of the NCAA (Division I)

2002 NCAA Division I Cross Country Championships
- Organisers: NCAA
- Edition: 64th–Men; 22nd–Women
- Date: November 25, 2002
- Host city: (Indiana) Terre Haute, IN
- Venue: Indiana State University; LaVern Gibson Championship Cross Country Course
- Distances: 10 km–Men; 6 km–Women
- Participation: 251–Men; 254–Women; 505–Total athletes

The 2002 NCAA Division I Cross Country Championships were the 64th annual NCAA Men's Division I Cross Country Championship and the 22nd annual NCAA Women's Division I Cross Country Championship to determine the team and individual national champions of NCAA Division I men's and women's collegiate cross country running in the United States. In all, four different titles were contested: men's and women's individual and team championships.

Held on November 25, 2002, the combined meet was hosted by Indiana State University at the LaVern Gibson Championship Cross Country Course in Terre Haute, Indiana. The distance for the men's race was 10 kilometers (6.21 miles) while the distance for the women's race was 6 kilometers (3.73 miles).

The men's team championship was won by Stanford (90 points), the Cardinal's third. The women's team championship was won by BYU (85 points), the Cougars' second consecutive, fourth overall, and fourth in six years.

The two individual champions were, for the men, Jorge Torres (Colorado, 29:04.7) and, for the women, Shalane Flanagan (North Carolina, 19:36.0).

== Men's title ==
- Distance: 10,000 meters

=== Men's Team Result (Top 10) ===
Rank	Team	Points
1st place, gold medalist(s)	Stanford	47
2nd place, silver medalist(s)	Wisconsin	107
3rd place, bronze medalist(s)	Eastern Michigan	165
4	Colorado	190
5	Oregon	210
6	Arkansas	214
7	Northern Arizona	247
8	Michigan	309
9	Central Michigan	337
10	Iona	376

=== Men's Individual Result (Top 10) ===
Rank	Name	Team	Time
1st place, gold medalist(s)	(United States) Jorge Torres	Colorado	29:04.7
2nd place, silver medalist(s)	(Republic of Ireland) Alistair Cragg	Arkansas	29:06.0
3rd place, bronze medalist(s)	(United States) Grant Robison	Stanford	29:36.7
4	(Australia) Mark Tucker	Butler University	29:37.5
5	(United States) Louis Luchini	Stanford	29:41.0
6	(United States) Donald Sage	Stanford	29:44.4
7	(Kenya) Boaz Cheboiywo	Eastern Michigan	29:46.1
8	(United States) Tom McArdle	Dartmouth	29:46.3
9	(United States) Ian Dobson	Stanford	29:47.2
10	(United States) Edwardo Torres	Colorado	29:47.7

== Women's title ==
- Distance: 6,000 meters

=== Women's Team Result (Top 10) ===
Rank	Team	Points
1st place, gold medalist(s)	BYU	85
2nd place, silver medalist(s)	Stanford	113
3rd place, bronze medalist(s)	Notre Dame	170
4	Georgetown	214
5	Colorado	220
6	Providence	235
7	Arkansas	251
8	Villanova	256
9	Wake Forest	328
10	Northern Arizona	333

=== Women's Individual Result (Top 10) ===
Rank	Name	Team	Time
1st place, gold medalist(s)	(United States) Shalane Flanagan	North Carolina	19:36.0
2nd place, silver medalist(s)	(United States) Kate O'Neill	Yale	19:45.9
3rd place, bronze medalist(s)	(United States) Alicia Craig	Stanford	19:48.0
4	(United States) Lauren Fleshman	Stanford	19:48.3
5	(Czech Republic) Michaela Manova	BYU	19:49.5
6	(United States) Molly Huddle	Notre Dame	19:55.7
7	(United States) Kassie Anderson	BYU	19:56.1
8	(Sweden) Ida Nilsson	Northern Arizona	19:57.7
9	(Canada) Megan Metcalfe	West Virginia	20:01.0
10	(United States) Sara Gorton	Colorado	20:01.4
