= Gabe Jennings =

American runner (born 1979)

Personal information
- National team: USA Track & Field
- Born: Gabriel Harmony Jennings; January 25, 1979 (age 47) Forks of Salmon, California, U.S.
- Education: Stanford University; University of Oregon School of Law
- Height: 6 ft 1 in (185 cm) (2008)
- Weight: 154 lb (70 kg) (2001))

Sport
- Country: USA
- University team: Stanford Cardinal
- Association: NCAA
- Former partner: Michael Stember
- Coached by: Vin Lananna
- Retired: 2009 (semi-retired)

Achievements and titles
- Personal bests: 800 meters: 1:46.99 (1998); 1500 meters: 3:35.21 (2000); Mile: 3:55.32 (1998); 3000 meters: 7:58.40 (1998); 5000 meters: 13:44.60 (2000)

Gabe Jennings (born January 25, 1979) is an American Olympian and semi-retired middle-distance runner. As a student at Madison East High School in Madison, Wisconsin, Jennings won nine state titles in the Wisconsin Interscholastic Athletic Association (WIAA) and held the 1600 meter record in the WIAA Division 1 with his 1997 time of 4:04.97 until it was broken in 2025 by Grady Lenn with a time of 4:01.79. At Stanford University, he was an All-America athlete ten times and an NCAA champion four times. He qualified for the 2000 Summer Olympics as a college junior but was eliminated during the semi-finals.

== Early life and education ==
Jennings, the elder of two siblings, was born on January 25, 1979, to two teachers in the rural community Forks of Salmon, California. He ran his first race at age 5 and, at the suggestion of his father, whose training Runner's World described as similar to "a suburban little-league dad," he ran two miles to and from school each day. The family moved to Madison, Wisconsin, when Jennings was 13 so his father pursue his doctorate at the University of Wisconsin. Jennings attended Madison East High School, where he ran cross country and played football his freshman year before focusing on running.

Jennings initially majored in math at Stanford University but changed to music late in his junior year. He played the piano, drums, harpsichord, didgeridoo, and berimbau and was known for engaging track and field audiences in "impromptu jam sessions" after meets. Much of his behavior, including sleeping at the foothills near campus or on the roof of a campus co-op in a tent, gave him the reputation of a free-spirited hippie by teammates and sports media alike, though he rejected this descriptor, both for himself and his family.

== Running career ==
=== High school ===
The summer before his freshman year, Jennings finished second in the 1600 meters at the National Hershey Track and Field Meet in Hershey, Pennsylvania. In fall 1994, he qualified for the WIAA Division 1 State Cross Country Championships and placed eighth overall. The following spring, he won state titles in both the 1600 meters (4:15.6) and the 3200 meters (9:15.7) at the WIAA Division 1 track and field state championships and qualified for the Foot Locker Cross Country Championships, where he placed seventh with a time of 15:29.3 and earned All-American Honors. At the WIAA State Track & Field Championships in 1996, he won three individual distance events: 800 meters (1:54.4), 1600 meters (4:12.1), and 3200 meters (9:20.29). Jennings ran his first 1500 meters in 1996 at the Penn Relays and won (3:55.6). In 1997, he won the high school 1500 meters (3:45.98), 1600 meters (4:04.97), and 800 meters (1:52.18) titles, and ran with his teammates in the 4 × 800 meters relay, helping move the team to fifth place with an overall time of 7:59.26. During his senior year, Jennings again won the individual state title in cross country but finished 27 of 32 at the Foot Locker Championships due to a side stitch. At the Prefontaine Classic in Eugene, Oregon, a few weeks later, his mile time was 4:02.81, the fastest student mile in 23 years. He was named Gatorade Athlete of the Year in 1996 and 1997 and finished his high school career with nine state titles.

=== Collegiate ===
Though Jennings was redshirted for cross country during his freshman year at Stanford University, he won the US Junior National Cross Country Championships, becoming the fourth sequential Cardinal to claim the title. He competed in the track and field season and finished as the top freshman in the nation in the 800 meters, 1500 meters, and 3000 meters. The only athlete ahead of him in the 5000 meters was his teammate Jonathon Riley. He ran the 3000 meters in 7:58.40, the second fastest ever run by an American junior athlete, and was the first American junior to run a sub-4 minute mile in over 12 years. He also earned Indoor All-America honors from the NCAA by finishing fourth in the 3000 meters at the NCAA Division I Men's Indoor Track and Field Championships. A few months later, he won the 1500 meters final at the Men's Outdoor Track and Field Championships and spent the summer competing in the US Junior Track & Field Championships, during which he won the 1500 meters and 5000 meters races, and the World Junior Championships.

Jennings competed in the Cardinal Invitational during his sophomore year but persistent training-related injuries kept him and teammate Michael Stember off the NCAA team for the year. He ran several races unattached, finishing first in the 1500 meters at the Pac-10 Championships and fourth in the US Outdoor Track & Field Championships. He won Stanford's Block "S" Outstanding Male Sophomore Award before spending the summer competing in Europe. Jennings started his junior cross country season as part of the winning team at the Brigham Young University Invitational and 4th at the NCAA West Regional, but lagged behind in the Stanford Invitational, finishing 16th; the Pac-10 Championships, in 20th; the Pre-Nationals, in 48th; and the NCAA Championships, in 123rd. In track and field, Jennings ran the opening 1200 meters leg of Stanford's distance medley relay that won the NCAA Indoor Championship and set a new NCAA indoor record with a time of 9:28.83. He also won the mile (3:59.46), the indoor 1500 meters, placed seventh in the 3000 meters (8:04.96), and earned his third All-American plaque. Stanford finished second overall for the third consecutive year. In the outdoor competition, he finished first in the 1500 meters, which marked his third NCAA title of the year. In 1999, he won the Vancouver Henry Jerome Classic 1500 meters in 3:40:41 and later competed with the USA Track & Field middle distance development crew in Europe. By 2000, Jennings' best time in the 1500 meters was 3:35.90, the best in the US at that time. Jennings finished his collegiate career by competing in the 2001 World Championships in Athletics in Edmonton, Canada, where he placed 11th, and the USA Outdoor Track and Field Championships.

=== Olympics qualifiers ===
During his junior year, Jennings finished first with a new personal best of 3:35.90 at the qualifying heat for the 1500 meters and qualified for the Olympic team. He finished sixth in the preliminary heat and advanced to the semifinals, where he finished ninth and was eliminated.

=== Post-collegiate ===
Due to lingering injuries, including one to his Achilles heel, Jennings did not compete between 2002 and 2004. In 2002, he lived in Cuba for a few weeks before moving to New York City. In 2003, he biked from California to Brazil to study capoeira, a trip documented by Track & Field News. During his trip, he suffered from dysentry and severe hepatitis A and was forced to convalesce for a month at his parents' home in Mendocino after nearly succumbing to liver failure. In 2004, after recovering, he trained in Kenya with distance runners, including the Dutch Olympic team, and at some point lived in British Columbia to become a rock climber. In 2005, he won the Humbolt Half-Marathon; placed second at the California International Marathon; finished fourth (14:45.97) in a 5000 meters race at Berkeley; and ran 7000 meters of a 10,000 meters race at the Stanford Invitational. In 2006, he finished fourth (3:39.42) at the IAAF World Cup 1500 meters and trailed winner Bernard Lagat in the 1500 at the USATF Championships. He also ran the DécaNation and Fifth Avenue Mile, and was part of Team Running USA between 2005 and 2006. In May 2008, he moved to Eugene, Oregon, in preparation for the 2008 Olympic Trials. While living there, he became both a volunteer assistant coach at South Eugene High School and a legislative researcher for the Lane County Commissioner. He semi-retired in 2009 and was inducted into Stanford's Athletics Hall of Fame in 2018.

== Post-running life ==
Jennings graduated from University of Oregon School of Law in 2012, then pursued his LL.M. in environmental law at the Ocean University of China. He returned to the United States in 2019 after teaching for several years in China.
