= Nyssa High School =

Location
- 824 Adrian Boulevard; Nyssa, Oregon 97913; United States; 43°52′37″N 117°00′09″W

Information
- Type: Public
- School district: Nyssa School District
- Teaching staff: 23.18 (on an FTE basis)
- Grades: 9-12
- Enrollment: 335 (2024-2025)
- Student to teacher ratio: 14.45
- Colors: Royal blue and white
- Athletics conference: OSAA Eastern Oregon League 3A-5
- Nickname: Bulldogs
- Newspaper: Bulldog Bulletin
- Website: nhs.nyssa.k12.or.us

Nyssa High School is a high school located in Nyssa, Oregon, United States. It is in the Nyssa School District.

== Academics ==
In 1985, Nyssa High School was honored in the Blue Ribbon Schools Program, the highest honor a school can receive in the United States.

== Demographics ==
The demographic breakdown of the 326 students enrolled in 2016-17 was:

- Male - 49.1%
- Female - 50.9%
- Native American/Alaskan - 0.6%
- Asian - 0.3%
- Hispanic - 69.0%
- White - 28.2%
- Multiracial - 1.9%

72.4% of the students were eligible for free or reduced-cost lunch.

== Notable alumni ==
- Leo Long, 1954 NCAA champion in the javelin throw
