= Pete Swanson (American football) =

American football player (born 1974)

No. 68
- Position: Offensive guard

Personal information
- Born: March 26, 1974; Hollister, California, U.S.
- Listed height: 6 ft 5 in (1.96 m)
- Listed weight: 315 lb (143 kg)

Career information
- High school: San Benito (Hollister)
- College: Stanford
- NFL draft: 1997: undrafted
- Expansion draft: 1999: 1st round, 13th overall pick

Career history
- Kansas City Chiefs (1997–1998); Cleveland Browns (1999)*; San Francisco 49ers (1999)*; San Diego Chargers (2000)*; Rhein Fire (2000); St Louis Rams (2000)
- * Offseason or practice squad member only

Awards and highlights
- World Bowl 2000 champion

Career NFL statistics
- Games played: 3
- Stats at Pro Football Reference

Peter C. Swanson (born March 26, 1974) is an American former professional football player who was an offensive guard for one season with the St. Louis Rams. He also played for the Rhein Fire. He played college football for the Stanford Cardinal.

== Early life ==
Swanson was born on March 26, 1974, in Hollister, California. He played college football at Stanford University.

Swanson was also an All-American thrower for the Stanford Cardinal track and field team, finishing 4th in the shot put and 8th in the weight throw at the 1995 NCAA Division I Indoor Track and Field Championships.

== Professional career ==
Swanson was originally signed with the Kansas City Chiefs in 1997 as an undrafted free agent. But he did not play any games. In 1999 he was picked in the Cleveland Browns Expansion Draft. He also signed with the San Francisco 49ers in 1999 and did not play any games. Swanson played with the Rhein Fire and St Louis Rams in 2000, he played three games with the Rams. In his NFL career he played three games.
