= Fiona O'Keeffe =

American long-distance runner (born 1998)

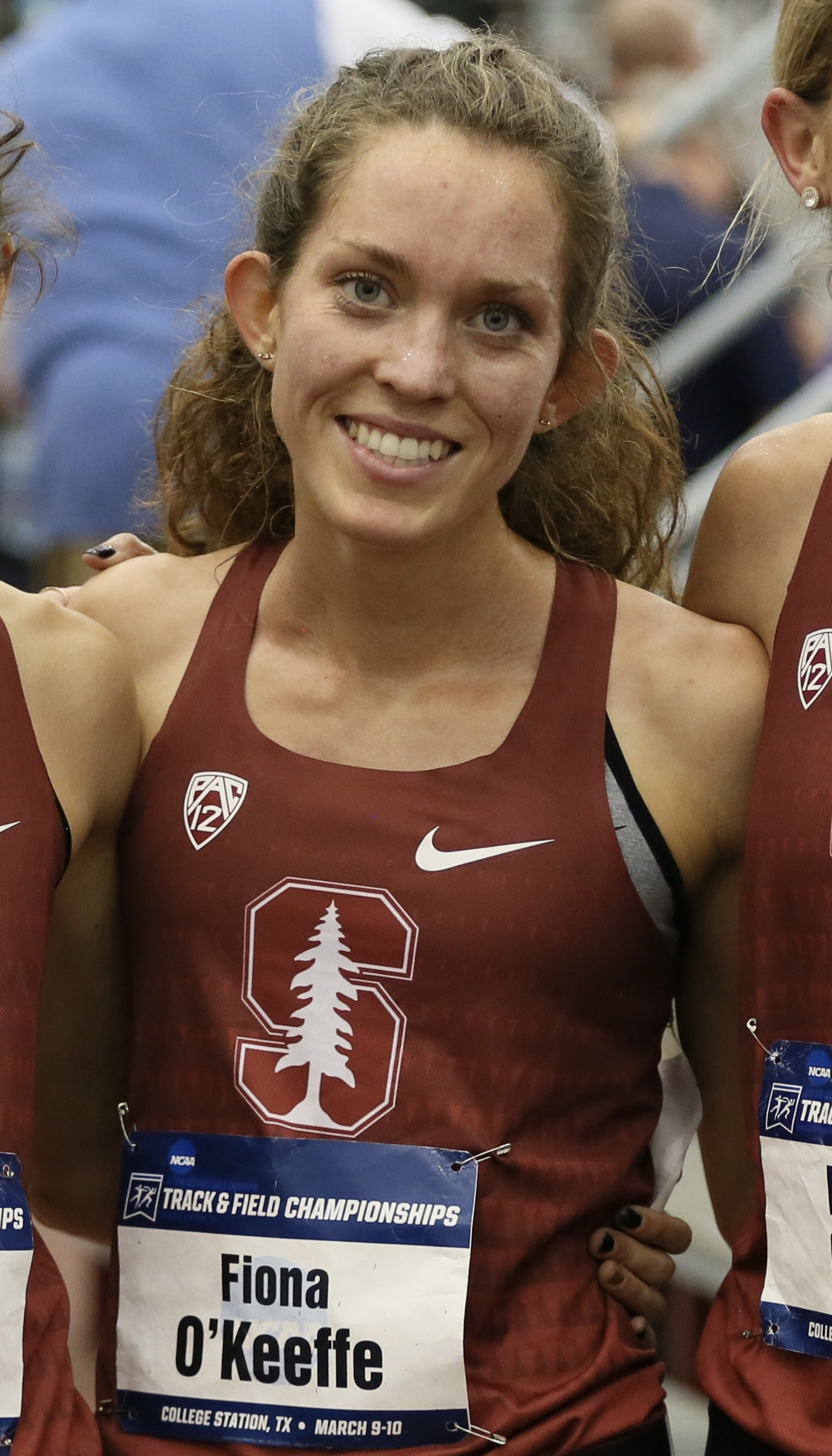
- O'Keeffe at the 2018 NCAA Division I Indoor Track and Field Championships

Personal information
- Nationality: United States
- Born: May 24, 1998 (age 28) Davis, California, U.S.
- Education: Davis Senior High School; Stanford University '20
- Height: 5 ft 7 in (170 cm)

Sport
- Sport: Athletics
- Events: 5000 m 10,000 m Marathon
- College team: Stanford Cardinal
- Club: Puma Elite Running
- Turned pro: Jan 2021
- Coached by: Amy and Alistair Cragg

Achievements and titles
- Personal bests: 10,000m: 30:52.77 (Walnut 2023); Half Marathon: 1:07:42 (Houston 2022); Marathon: 2:22:10 (Orlando 2024)
Medal record
Women's athletics
Representing the United States
NACAC Championships
Silver medal – second place	2022 Freeport	5000 m

Fiona O'Keeffe (born May 24, 1998) is an American long-distance runner. She is best known for being the first woman to win the United States Olympic Marathon Trials in her marathon debut, and in that same race being the youngest woman to win an Olympic Trials marathon, in 2024 at age 25.

== Athletics career ==
=== High School ===
As a prep for Davis Senior High School in her hometown of Davis, California, O'Keeffe won the 2016 CIF California State Meet title in the 3200 meters and was a two-time state cross country champion. Fiona O'Keeffe won 2014 Gatorade California Cross Country Runner of the Year. She also ran 15:56.84 for 5000 metres at the 2016 USATF U20 Outdoor Championships, making her the 6th-fastest US high school performer of all time.

=== Stanford University ===
O'Keeffe competed as a part of the Stanford Cardinal track and field program, from 2016 to 2020. At Stanford, Fiona O'Keeffe won 2019 Pac-12 Conference cross country championships title in 19:32.7 and earned eight NCAA Division I All-American championship awards, with a best placing of 3rd at the 2019 NCAA Division I Indoor Track and Field Championships in the 5000 m.

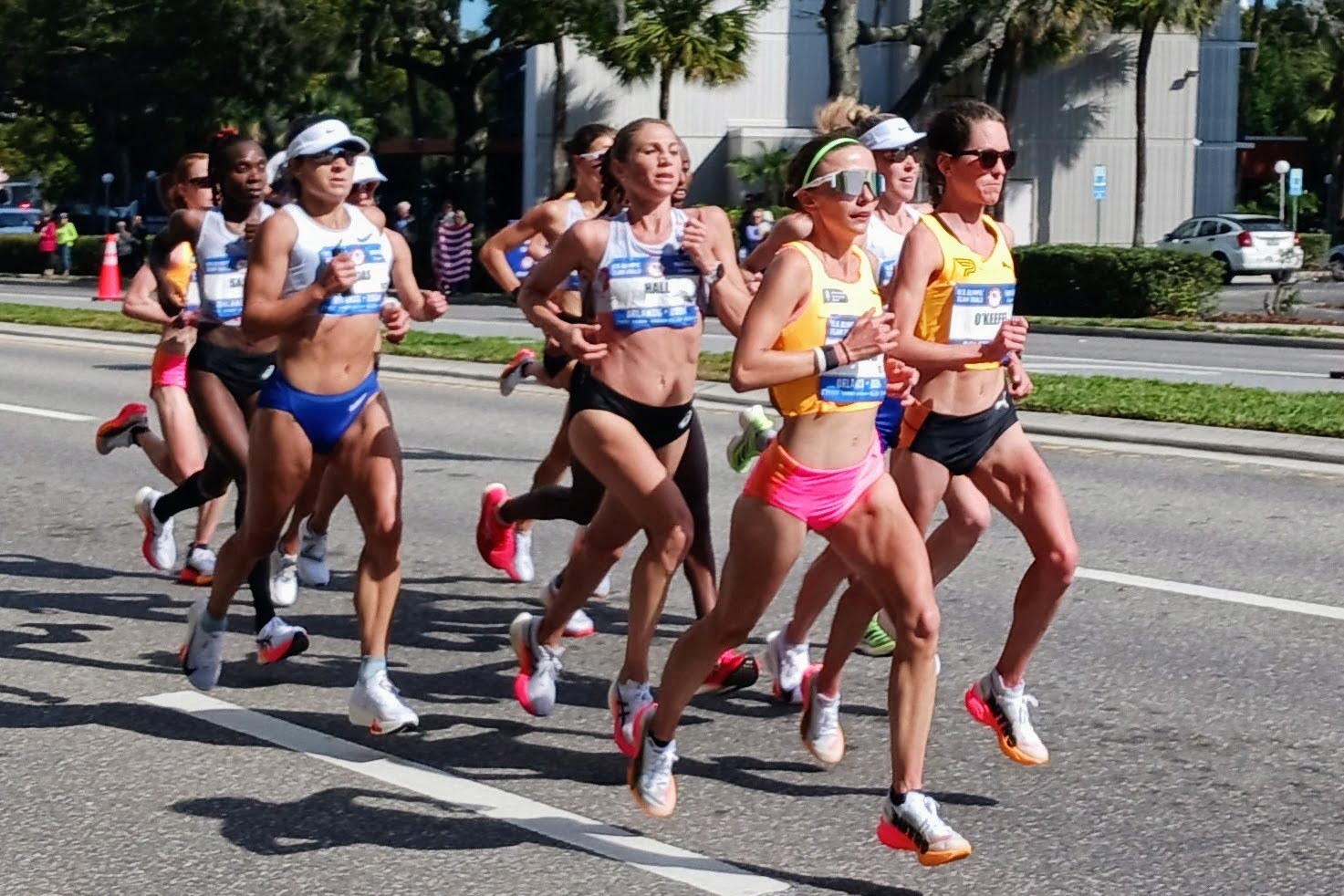
O'Keefe (far-right) at the 2024 US Olympic Marathon Trials

=== Professional ===
After turning professional in 2021, signing with Puma, O'Keeffe competed at the US Olympic Trials in Eugene, Oregon. Contesting the 10,000 m, she placed 20th.

In January 2022, O'Keeffe finished fourth at the Houston Half Marathon in 1:07:42, the fastest debut half marathon for an American woman. In June of the same year, she ran a 5000 m personal best of 15:05.56 in Portland and placed sixth in the 5000 m at the USA Track and Field Championships. In August, she won a bronze medal at the NACAC Championships in the Bahamas.

In 2023, she ran personal bests over 5000 m (15:01.34) and 10,000 m (30:52.77), and represented the United States in the 5 km at the World Road Running Championships, placing sixth.

On February 3, 2024, O'Keeffe won the 2024 United States Olympic trials marathon in Orlando, Florida in 2:22:10, qualifying her to represent the United States at the 2024 Summer Olympics. It was her first marathon, having qualified for the trials with a 1:09:34 at the 2023 Raleigh Holiday Half Marathon. This made her the first woman to win the United States Olympic Marathon Trials in her marathon debut, and the youngest woman to win an Olympic Trials marathon, at age 25.

She competed in the 2024 Paris Olympics Women's marathon on 11 August 2024 where she dropped out before 5k due to hip injury and did not finish.

In 2025, O'Keeffe placed fourth at the New York City Marathon with a time of 2:22:49. She was the top American finisher and her time was the fastest ever on the NYC course by an American woman.

== Championship results ==
=== USA Championships ===
Representing Puma (2021–present) and Davis Senior (2016)
Year	Competition	Venue	Position	Event	Time
2016	USATF U20 Championships	Clovis, California	1st	5000 m	15:56.84
2021	US Olympic Trials	Eugene, Oregon	20th	10,000 m	33:03.09
2021	US 6 km Road Championships	Canton, Ohio	4th	6 km	18:41
2022	USATF Championships	Eugene, Oregon	6th	5000 m	15:58.86
2022	USA 10 Mile Road Championships	Minneapolis, Minnesota	1st	10 Miles	51:42
2024	US Olympic Marathon Trials	Orlando, Florida	1st	Marathon	2:22:10

=== NCAA Championships ===
Representing Stanford University
Year	Venue	Position	Event	Time
NCAA Cross Country Championships
2016	Terre Haute, Indiana	37th	6 km	20:23.3
2017	Seattle, Washington	13th	6 km	19:31.7
2018	Sacramento, California	17th	6 km	19:27.0
2019	Terre Haute, Indiana	27th	6 km	20:36.8
NCAA Indoor Track and Field Championships
2018	College Station, Texas	10th	3000 m	9:10.54
2019	Birmingham, Alabama	3rd	5000 m	15:37.61
NCAA Outdoor Track and Field Championships
2017	Eugene, Oregon	5th	5000 m	15:46.93
2019	Austin, Texas	7th	5000 m	16:07.84

== Personal best progressions ==
=== 5000 metres ===
#	Mark	Pl.	Competition	Venue	Date	Ref
1	15:56.84	1st place, gold medalist(s)	USATF U20 Championships	Clovis, California	Jun 24, 2016	
2	15:46.93	5th	NCAA Championships	Eugene, Oregon	Jun 10, 2017	
3	15:34.44	5th	Portland Track Festival	Portland, Oregon	Jun 10, 2018	
4	15:05.56	4th	Portland Track Festival	Portland, Oregon	Jun 11, 2022	
5	15:01.34	3rd	BU Valentine Invitational	Boston, Massachusetts	Feb 10, 2023	

=== 10,000 metres ===
#	Mark	Pl.	Competition	Venue	Date	Ref
1	33:36.25	7th	Pac-12 Track & Field Championships	Stanford, California	May 11, 2018	
2	32:12.28	5th (Round B)	The Track Meet	San Juan Capistrano, California	Dec 4, 2020	
3	30:55.05	5th	The Ten	San Juan Capistrano, California	Mar 3, 2023	
4	30:52.77	1st place, gold medalist(s)	Track Fest	Walnut, California	May 5, 2023	
