= Pam Dukes =

American shot putter

Personal information
- Nationality: American
- Born: May 15, 1964 (age 62) The Bronx, New York, United States

Sport
- Sport: Athletics
- Event: Shot put

Pamela "Pam" Dukes (born May 15, 1964) is an American athlete. She competed in the women's shot put at the 1992 Summer Olympics.

Competing for the Stanford Cardinal track and field team, Dukes won the 1987 shot put at the NCAA Division I Indoor Track and Field Championships with a mark of 17.40 meters.
