= Wade Bell =

American middle-distance runner (1945–2024)

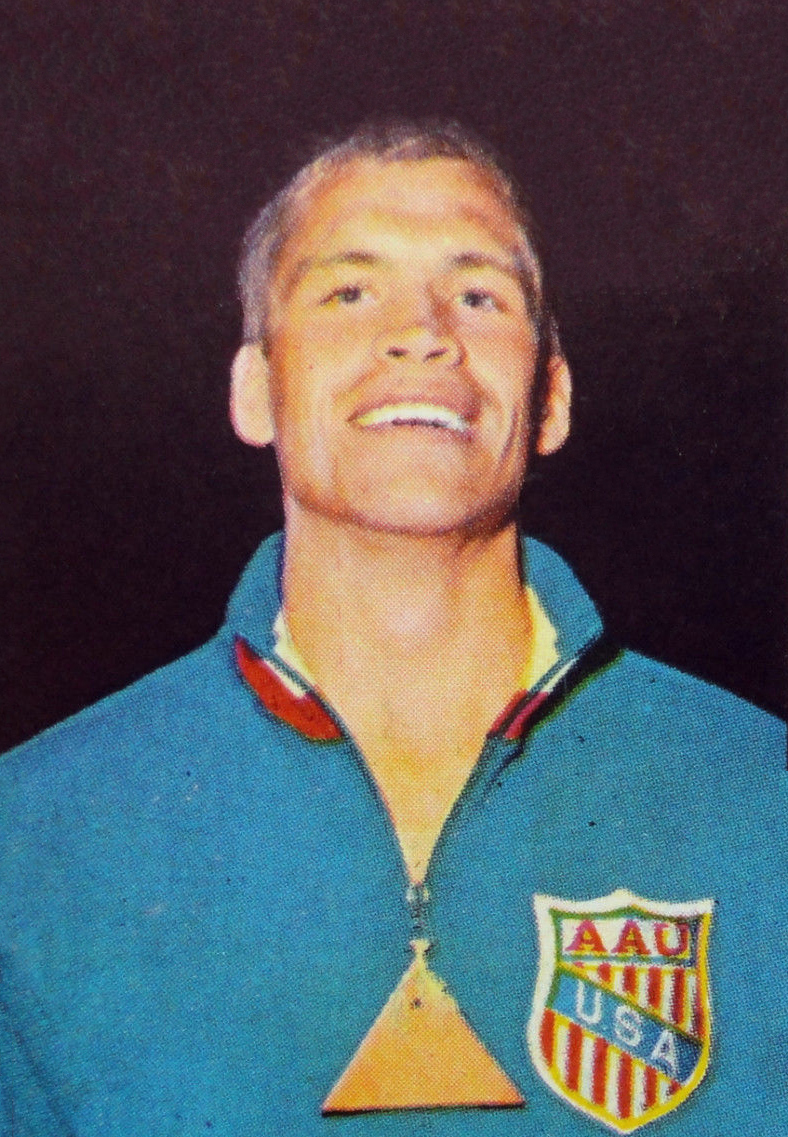
- Bell in 1968

Personal information
- Born: January 3, 1945 Ogden, Utah, U.S.
- Died: July 4, 2024 (aged 79) Eugene, Oregon, U.S.
- Height: 1.80 m (5 ft 11 in)
- Weight: 70 kg (154 lb)

Sport
- Sport: Athletics
- Event: 800 m
- Club: Oregon Track Club, Eugene

Achievements and titles
- Personal bests: 800 m – 1:45.0 (1967); Mile – 3:59.8 (1966).
Medal record
Representing the United States
Pan America Games
Gold medal – first place	1967 Winnipeg	800 m

Charles Wade Bell (January 3, 1945 – July 4, 2024) was an American middle distance runner, who competed at the 1968 Summer Olympics in Mexico City. He is best known for winning the gold medal in the men's 800 m event at the 1967 Pan American Games in Winnipeg, Manitoba, Canada.

== Career ==
Wade Bell ran collegiately for the University of Oregon and professionally for Oregon Track Club. In 1968, Bell was a member of Oregon TC's 4×800 meter relay team, which broke the world record in the event at the time, although it was not ratified by the IAAF. Bell was the 17th American man to break 4 minutes in the mile, doing so in 1966.

=== Post professional career ===
Wade Bell remained actively involved in Track and Field. In 1970, Bell began his service as a course clerk at Oregon's Hayward Field. Throughout the 1970s, Bell served as president of the Oregon Track Club and directed the Prefontaine Classic.

== Personal life and death ==
Wade Bell was a member of the Church of Jesus Christ of Latter-day Saints.

Bell died in Eugene, Oregon on July 4, 2024, at the age of 79. He had worked two days at the 2024 Olympic Trials for track and field at Hayward Field before being hospitalized.
