= Brian Marshall (high jumper) =

Canadian high jumper

Personal information
- Born: April 1, 1965 (age 60) Ottawa, Ontario, Canada

Sport
- Country: Canada
- Event: high jump

Brian Marshall (born April 1, 1965) is a Canadian retired track and field athlete, who competed in the men's high jump at the 1988 Summer Olympics.

Originally from Ottawa, Ontario, Marshall was an active athlete in high school, setting a national Canada-wide high jump record at the high school level in 1981. He subsequently attended Stanford University, where he won a Pac-10 championship in the high jump in 1988; his 2.28 metres (7 ft 6 in) jump remained the all-time record for a Stanford University athlete as of 2016.

At the 1988 Summer Olympics, he jumped 2.22 metres (7 ft 3 in), placing 17th — a tie with fellow Canadian jumper Milton Ottey and South Korean jumper Cho Hyun-Wook — and failing to qualify for the finals.

Marshall came out as gay in 1994 by attending a political gala at Rideau Hall as the guest of Svend Robinson, Canada's first openly gay Member of Parliament. He was also a panelist at the 2003 National Gay and Lesbian Athletics Conference in Cambridge, Massachusetts, on a panel of LGBT Olympians that also included swimmer Mark Tewksbury and rower Harriet Metcalf.

== Achievements ==
Year	Competition	Venue	Position	Notes
Representing Canada
1988 Summer Olympics	Men's high jump	Seoul, South Korea	17th	2.22 metres (7 ft 3 in)
