= Idara Otu =

Nigerian sprinter

Idara Otu (born 5 July 1987, Atlanta, US) is a Nigerian sprinter. She competed in the 4 × 400 m relay event at the 2012 Summer Olympics.

Otu was an All-American sprinter for the Stanford Cardinal track and field team, finishing 3rd as the 400 m leg on the distance medley relay at the 2008 NCAA Division I Indoor Track and Field Championships.

She is also the founder of the Let Girls Read, Run, Grow Foundation, that provides underserved girls necessary resources to succeed in life through programming in education, sport and agriculture and hopes to provide the world's next group of leaders.
