= Ian Dobson (runner) =

American distance runner

Personal information
- Nationality: American
- Born: February 6, 1982 (age 44) Deer Lodge, Montana
- Height: 6 ft 2 in (1.88 m)
- Weight: 165

Sport
- Sport: Athletics
- Event: 5000 metres
- College team: Stanford Cardinal
- Club: Nike
- Turned pro: 2005

Achievements and titles
- Personal bests: 5000 m: 13:15.33; 10,000 m: 27:59.72
Medal record
Representing the United States

Ian Dobson is an American long-distance coach and retired Olympic runner.

== High school career ==
Dobson competed at Klamath Union High School in Oregon where he was 2nd in the state in the 1500 meters and 3000 meters as well as a two-time Oregon state cross country champion. Ian Dobson finished seventh in 1998 and third at 1999 Foot Locker Cross Country Championships in 14:34 behind Dathan Ritzenhein and Donald Sage.

== College career ==
Dobson ran for the Stanford Cardinal track and field team (2000-2005) where he was a 10-time All-American, NCAA runner-up and the 2005 NCAA champion indoors in the 5,000 meters. Dobson graduated from Stanford University in 2005. Dobson holds the Stanford University record in two distance events; the 3,000 meter steeplechase (8:32.09), the 5,000 meters (13:15.33).

== International career ==
In 2005, Dobson was runner-up at the US Championships in the 5000 metres. This qualified him for the 2005 World Championships in Athletics where in the men's 5000 metres he finished 10th in his heat and failed to advance. Dobson also competed in the 2005 IAAF World Cross Country Championships in the Senior men's race finishing 61st.

In 2006, Dobson competed in the 2006 IAAF World Cross Country Championships in the Senior men's race finishing 33rd. Dobson also finished 3rd at the Chiba International Cross Country meet.

In 2008, Dobson finished 3rd at the US Olympic Trials in the 5000 metres earning a berth at the 2008 Olympics. At the Olympics, in the men's 5000 metres Dobson finished 9th in his heat and failed to advance.

From 2005 to 2009 Dobson ran for Adidas and from 2010 to 2012 Dobson ran for Nike and the Oregon Track Club Elite.

== Team Run Eugene Coach ==
Since 2012, Ian leads a group of Olympic and World Championship elite athletes.

== Coaching and Eugene Marathon years ==
Dobson is currently the long distance coach for Sheldon High School, and works for the Eugene Marathon
