= Oiselle =

Women's Running Apparel Company based in Seattle

Oiselle, French for bird, is a women's running apparel company started by Sally Bergesen in Seattle in 2007.

Oiselle was the first women-only brand to sponsor college athletes, when they provided the uniforms for Yale's track and cross country teams. They also sponsor professional athletes, with athlete advisor Lauren Fleshman. As of February 2025, current sponsored athletes include Carmen Graves, Maria Michta-Coffey, and Allie Ostrander. The company was the first brand to sponsor a pregnant athlete in 2013. Other runners have included Kara Goucher.

In 2023, Oiselle merged with fellow running brand Janji.
