= Garrett Heath =

American athlete (born 1985)

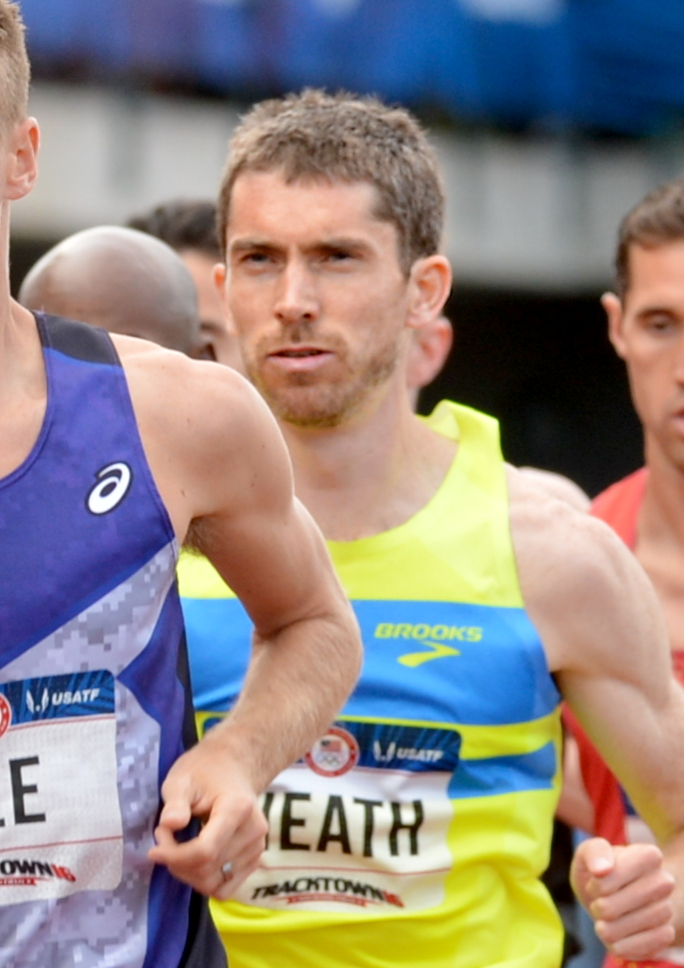
- Heath running 5000 m at the 2016 Olympic Trials

Personal information
- Nationality: American
- Born: November 3, 1985 (age 40) Winona, Minnesota, U.S.

Sport
- Sport: Track
- Event: 800–5000 meters
- College team: Stanford

Achievements and titles
- Personal bests: 1500m: 3:34.12; Mile: 3:53.15; 5000m: 13:16.31; 10,000m: 27:56.11
- Updated on October 19, 2018

Garrett Heath (born November 3, 1985) is an American runner from Winona, Minnesota, who raced in various middle and long-distance running events. He represented the United States at the 2010 World Indoor Championships where he finished seventh in the 1500 meters. He is the elder brother of Elliott Heath.

== High school ==
Heath is from Winona, Minnesota where he won 6 state titles in track and field and cross-country and two state titles in cross-country skiing. He qualified for the Foot Locker Cross Country Championships in his junior and senior years of high school and finished sixth in 2002 and 10th in 2003.

== Collegiate ==
Heath graduated high school and attended Stanford University, where he was a nine-time All-American (placing in the top 8 at the national championships in track and field or 35 in the single-event NCAA cross-country championships) including leadoff leg to the championship distance-medley relay team in the 2007 NCAA Indoor Track and Field Championships. He specialized in the 1500, mile and 5K and was one of the lead runners for the Stanford cross-country team. He broke the 4-minute mile barrier in 2007. He was one of only three collegians along with teammate Russell Brown and Leonel Manzano to run a mile in under four minutes that year. Heath was also the runner-up to Oklahoma State University's German Fernandez in the 2009 NCAA Outdoor Track and Field Championships.

== Post-collegiate ==
As a professional, Heath ran for Brooks, training with the Brooks Beasts track club. In 2012, the Olympic year, he was ranked 4th among US distance runners in the mile and the 1500m indoors. He was ranked 8th among U.S. 1500m runners for outdoor track. He finished ninth in his semifinal heat at the Olympic Trials, thus failing to qualify for the 2012 Olympic Team. Heath defeated Leonel Manzano in 2013 to win the USA 1 Mile Road Championship. In 2014, Heath was the surprise winner of the Great Edinburgh International Cross Country short course (4 km) race, then defended his title by winning again in 2015. A third victory came in 2016 when he gave world champion Mo Farah his first cross country defeat since 2010.

In 2022, Heath transitioned away from racing on the track and began focusing on trail racing as part of the Brooks Trail Running Team.

=== USA National Championships ===
Year	Competition	Venue	Position	Event	Notes
USATF Championships
Representing Brooks Sports
2018	USA Outdoor Track and Field Championships	Des Moines, Iowa	5th	10,000 metres	29:09.15
2018	USA Indoor Track and Field Championships	Albuquerque, New Mexico	6th	3000 metres	8:01.04
2017	2017 USA Outdoor Track and Field Championships	California State University, Sacramento	DNS	5000 metres	DNS
2017	USA Indoor Track and Field Championships	Albuquerque, New Mexico	3rd	Mile	4:00.31
2016	2016 USA Outdoor Track and Field Championships	Hayward Field	13th	5000 metres	13:55.58
2016	USA Indoor Track and Field Championships	Portland, Oregon	4th	1500 metres	3:46.67
2016	USA Indoor Track and Field Championships	Portland, Oregon	5th	3000 metres	7:41.26
2015	USA Club Cross Country Championships	San Francisco, California	1st	10,000 metres	29:04
2015	2015 USA Outdoor Track and Field Championships	Eugene, Oregon	4th	5000 metres	13:51.61
2015	2015 USA Indoor Track and Field Championships	Boston, Massachusetts	4th	3000 metres	8:27.99
2014	2014 USA Outdoor Track and Field Championships	Sacramento, California	9th	1500 metres	3:40.28
Representing Saucony
2013	2013 USA Outdoor Track and Field Championships	Des Moines, Iowa	30th	1500 metres	3:48.03
2013	2013 USA Outdoor Track and Field Championships	Des Moines, Iowa	9th	5000 metres	14:58.85
2012	2012 United States Olympic Trials (track and field)	Eugene, Oregon	14th	1500 metres	3:42.95
