= Gay Bryan =

American long and triple jumper (1927–2015)

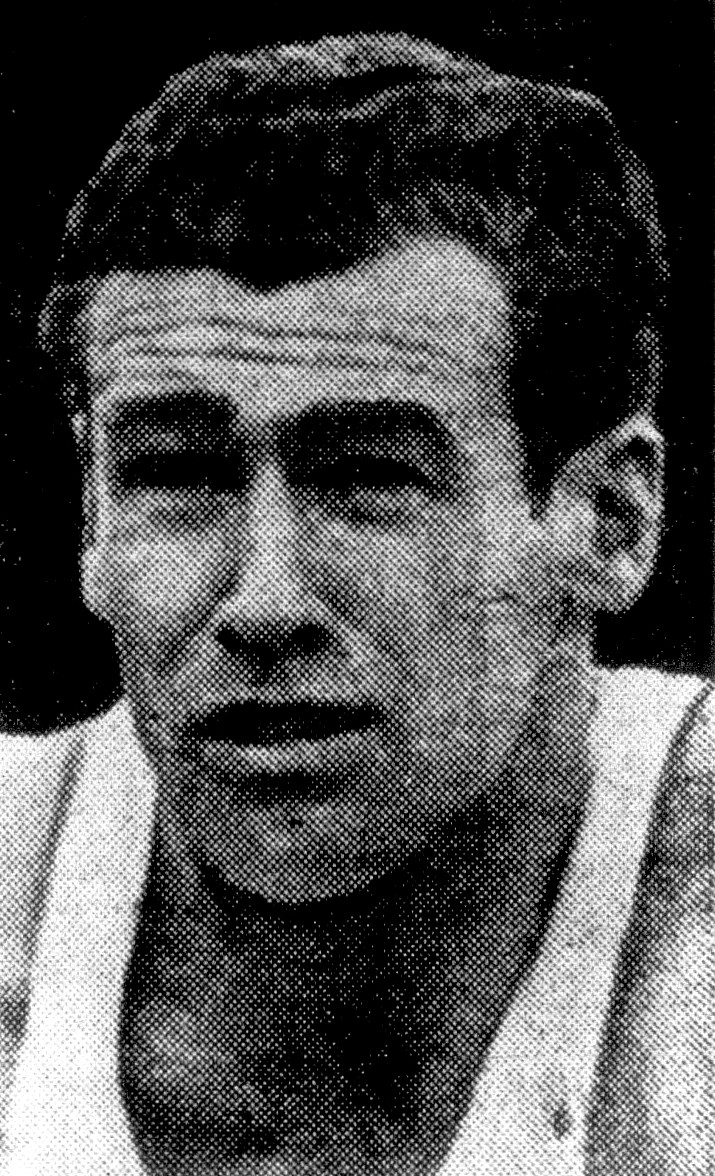
Bryan, circa 1950

Gaylord Damian "Gay" Bryan (May 1, 1927 – April 25, 2015) was a male long and triple jumper from the United States, who competed in the 1940s and 1950s for his native country. Bryan set his personal best in the men's long jump event (7.74 metres) on April 9, 1949, at a meet in Westwood. He failed to qualify for the Summer Olympics (1948 and 1952) during his career. He won the gold medal in the long jump at the 1951 Pan American Games and was a four-time national champion in the triple jump.

Bryan competed collegiately for Stanford University and is a member of the school's Athletic Hall of Fame.

== Achievements ==
Year	Competition	Venue	Position	Notes
1948		Milwaukee, Wisconsin	1st	Triple jump
1949	US National Championships	Fresno, California	1st	Long jump
1949	US National Championships	Fresno, California	1st	Triple jump
1950	US National Championships	College Park, Maryland	4th	Long jump
1950	US National Championships	College Park, Maryland	1st	Triple jump
1951	US National Championships	Berkeley, California	2nd	Long jump
1951	US National Championships	Berkeley, California	1st	Triple jump
1951	Pan American Games	Buenos Aires, Argentina	1st	Long jump
1952	US National Championships	Long Beach, California	5th	Triple jump
