= Leo Long =

American javelin thrower and coach

Leo Evans Long is a former competitive American javelin thrower and track and field coach.

== Early life and competitive career ==
Long was born in Oklahoma, traveled to California during the Great Depression, and attended high school in Nyssa, Oregon, where he was a track star in the javelin at Nyssa High School. He attended Stanford University, where he was the individual javelin champion at the 1954 NCAA Men's Outdoor Track and Field Championship.

== Coaching career ==
After earning a bachelor's degree from Stanford University and a master's degree from the Stanford Graduate School of Education, Long was hired as a track coach at Los Altos High School in 1956, coaching at the school from 1956–1963 and again from 1969–1981. During his tenure, the school won 15 league titles, two section championships, and a boys' California state championship in 1970. Long also coached 11 individual state champions, and three discus national record holders: Bob Stoecker, Chris Adams, and Scott Overton. He also coached the Pakistan Olympic team in 1958 and the Sudan Olympic team in 1960.

== Legacy ==
Long is a member of the Stanford Athletic Hall of Fame. In 2008, Los Altos High School renamed its track in his honor.

Long lived with his wife Nancy in Benbow, California, and then later in Lincoln, California. He died in his home in Lincoln, California on March 9, 2020 after suffering from a recent stroke, and other underlying health conditions.
