= Lauren Fleshman =

American track and field athlete

Lauren Fleshman (born September 26, 1981) is an American runner, coach, author, and retired professional track and field athlete. She was the U.S. 5000 meters champion in 2006 and 2010, and competed at the IAAF World Championships in Athletics in 2003, 2005, and 2011. In the 5000 meter final of the 2011 IAAF World Championships she finished in 7th place, equalling what was at the time the highest ever finish by an American woman in that event.

Fleshman competed in a variety of middle and long distance events, ranging from the 1500 meters and mile to the 5,000 meters.

== Collegiate career ==
After graduating from Canyon High School in the Los Angeles suburb of Santa Clarita, Fleshman attended Stanford University. At Stanford, Fleshman was a 15-time All-American and five-time NCAA champion. She won consecutive NCAA outdoor national titles in the 5,000 meters in 2001, 2002 and 2003, and won the 2002 NCAA indoor 3000-meters. She also finished in the top five at the NCAA Cross Country Championship three times. In the 1500 meters, Fleshman was Pac-10 runner-up three times, and the 2001 Pac-10 cross-country champion.

Fleshman graduated from Stanford in 2003 with a BA in human biology and a concentration in "Women's Health and Athletic Performance". She earned an MA in education with a specialty in "Social Sciences in Education" from Stanford University in 2004.

== Professional career ==
After graduating from Stanford, Fleshman signed as a professional athlete with Nike. After initially training in Mammoth Lakes as part of a group including Jen Rhines and Deena Kastor, Fleshman joined Oregon Track Club Elite in Eugene in 2006.

Fleshman was unable to compete at the 2004 Olympic Trials due to an injury to her metatarsal. She finished second in the 2005 US National Championships in the 5000m event behind Shalane Flanagan. Fleshman won the 5K national championships in 2006, with a time of 15:12.37. She won Diamond League events in the 3000m in London in 2007, and in New York City in 2008. Her time of 14:58.58 in New York City made her the eighth-fastest ever American female runner at the time. At the 2008 Olympic Trials, Fleshman finished fifth overall in the 5K and first alternate for the Olympic team. Following the 2008 trials, she had surgery on her navicular bone and spent the next year recovering.

In 2010, Fleshman won her second national championship in the 5K with a time of 15:24.06. At the 2011 World Championships in Daegu, she finished 7th, at the time the best finish by an American woman in the history of the world championships. Eight weeks after Daegu, Fleshman debuted in the marathon at the 2011 New York City marathon, finishing 12th.

In 2012, Fleshman left Nike after the expiration of her contract and became the first professional athlete signed by Seattle-based brand Oiselle. She made the 5K final at her final Olympic Trials in 2012. Fleshman announced her retirement from professional running in July 2016, at the age of 34. The New York Times described her as "most likely being the best American distance runner never to make an Olympic team", with injuries affecting Fleshman's ability to compete during each of the Olympic Trials windows.

== Personal bests ==
Distance	Time	Year	Place
1500 Meters	4:05.62	2007	Rieti
3000 Meters	8:43.92	2007	London
5000 Meters	14:58.58	2008	New York City
Marathon	2:37:23	2011	New York City

=== Coaching history ===
- Mark Rowland, OTC Elite: 2009 to 2012
- Vin Lananna: 2007-2008
- Terrence Mahon, Team Running USA Mammoth: 2006
- Vin Lananna with Assistant Dena Evans, Stanford University: 1999-2005
- Dave DeLong with Assistants Paul Broneer and Tracy McCauley, Canyon High School: 1995-1999

== Off the track ==
In January 2009, Fleshman started a blog named "Ask Lauren Fleshman", where she answered questions from running fans and provided a window into her life as a professional runner. In 2013, the blog evolved into a monthly column that Fleshman wrote for Runner's World magazine, titled "The Fast Life".

Fleshman is an outspoken advocate for athlete rights, particularly in terms of female athlete coaching and development, body image, allocation of revenue, and the structure of worldwide professional running. Fleshman was elected to serve as an athletes' representative on the USA Track & Field Board of Directors in 2016. She left the board in 2020; Fleshman described her time on the board as primarily "political backstabbing".

In 2013, Fleshman became the first coach of Littlewing Athletics, a professional running team sponsored by Oiselle and based in Bend, Oregon. She coached Littlewing for eight years, stepping aside as head coach in 2021. Since 2021, Fleshman has worked as a brand strategy advisor for Oiselle.

Fleshman published her memoir, Good for a Girl, in 2023. The book covers both her own running career along with critiques and analysis of how professional sport treats female athletes. The book was a New York Times best-seller, ranking 10th in its debut on the hardcover non-fiction list. It also was named the William Hill Sports Book of the Year in 2023, making it the first book written by a woman and about women's sports to receive that honor.

=== Entrepreneurial ventures ===
Fleshman, husband Jesse Thomas, and professional runner Stephanie Bruce co-founded the gluten and dairy free energy bar company Picky Bars in 2009. In 2021, Picky Bars was purchased by Laird Superfoods for $12 million.

In 2011, Fleshman and Irish Olympic runner Roisin McGettigan co-founded the brand "Believe I Am", a business creating sport psychology tools for female athletes including a mind/body training journal and apparel.

== Personal life ==
Fleshman is the daughter of Joyce and Frank Fleshman and has one younger sister, Lindsay, who is a nurse. Fleshman married fellow Stanford graduate and professional triathlete Jesse Thomas in Bend, Oregon, on 30 September 2007. They have two children. In February 2023, Fleshman and Thomas stated on social media that they were amicably separating.
