= Oregon Track Club =

American running organization

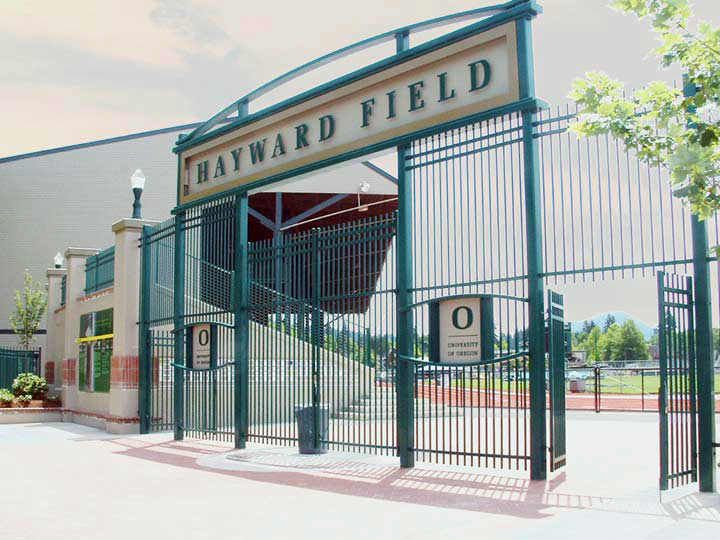
- Hayward Field entrance as seen in 2006
- Abbreviation: OTC
- Formation: 1958; 68 years ago as "Emerald Empire Athletic Association"
- Location: Eugene, Oregon, US
- Region served: United States
- Website: oregontrackclub.com

The Oregon Track Club (OTC) is a volunteer-based American running organization based in Eugene, Oregon that is governed by a board of directors.

== History ==
=== Emerald Empire Athletic Association ===
Formed by Bill Bowerman, the Emerald Empire Athletic Association (EEAA) was the predecessor to the Oregon Track Club. In 1948, Bill Bowerman became the assistant track coach at the University of Oregon, in Eugene, Oregon. In order to spur interest in running with the local community, Bowerman formed an all comers meet for grade-schoolers in 1949. The next year the meet was expanded to include high school and college athletes. The low turnout of the all comers meet caused Bowerman to want to increase his efforts in promoting track and field in Eugene. In 1958, with the help of Ray Hendrickson and Bob Newland, Bowerman established the Emerald Empire Athletic Association. Ralph Christensen became the first president of the EEAA, and along with the other leaders established the goals for the EEAA:

1. To promote youth program for youngsters in track and field.
2. To provide training assistance and facilities for track and field athletes of all ages.
3. To sponsor one big track meet each summer as a fundraising event to support the other goals.

=== Change to Oregon Track Club ===
In 1965 the Emerald Empire Athletic Association changed its name to the Oregon Track Club. This was in part due to the leadership's desire to concentrate mainly on track and field. Beginning in the late 1960s, the OTC started to become a dominant force in American Track and Field. Due to the relationship between the University of Oregon and the Oregon Track Club (both in Eugene, same coaches), many athletes from the University of Oregon's strong cross country and track and field programs decided to remain in Eugene to compete with the Oregon Track Club. The most notable of these athletes are Steve Prefontaine, who placed fourth in the 1972 Summer Olympics in the men's 5000 meters race, and Mac Wilkins, who received the gold medal in the discus throw at the 1976 Summer Olympics. During the '70s, the OTC sent dozens of athletes to the Olympics and won several medals.

== Branches ==
The Oregon Track Club is made up of three branches: the general club, the elite club, and the masters club.

=== General Club ===
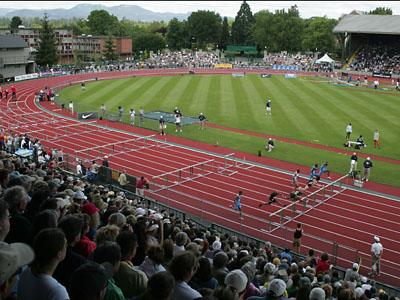
Hayward Field in Eugene, Oregon

The general part of the OTC is the largest subgroup in the OTC. It is made up of athletes under the age of 30 who pursue running for enjoyment. Many of these runners had no or little NCAA running experience, but are still running every day and competing in organized meets because of the passion they exhibit for the sport. These members of the OTC have helped increase popularity in Track and Field in the United States. They also helped design Hayward Field and hosted major meets such as the 2008 US Olympic Trials.

=== Elite ===
OTC Elite is the professional branch of the OTC and is based in Eugene, Oregon. The predecessor of the OTC Elite was the Nike Farm Team, founded in 1994 by Vin Lananna. The current format of the club was created in 2006, and originally coached by Frank Gagliano. In 2008 Mark Rowland became the Head Coach of OTC. For a time there were three groups of athletes who wore the OTC Elite uniform, one coached by Alberto Salazar and one coached by Jerry Schumacher. Alberto Salazar went on to coach the Nike Oregon Project until he was suspended and then banned for life, while Jerry Schumacher went on to coach Nike's Bowerman Track Club. The team has had great success, culminating at the 2011 IAAF World Championships with High Jumper Jesse Williams winning Gold, Ashton Eaton winning Silver in the Decathlon, and Sally Kipyego winning Silver in the 10,000 meters.

=== Masters ===
The masters and submasters division of the OTC is a subgroup of the OTC designed for older members to stay competitive. The masters and submasters divisions have age restrictions to provide fair competition between athletes: 40 years old and older for the masters division and 30 to 39 years old for the submasters division. The OTC's masters division hosts the Hayward Classic, which is one of the more popular masters track meets in the country.

=== Youth ===
In 2019, the club added a youth cross-country program. It is designed to fuel kids' excitement and love for running by giving them the opportunity to participate in this historic club, and to be a part of Eugene's worldwide fame as "TrackTown USA." A unique aspect of the program is that the young athletes receive encouragement and coaching from OTC elite runners, Olympians, and other local celebrities.

== Runners ==
=== Notable current athletes ===
The following athletes compete as part of the OTC Elite in Eugene:

- Nijel Amos
- Ben Blankenship
- Tom Farrell
- Hanna Green
- Sally Kipyego
- Hassan Mead
- Francine Niyonsaba
- Andrew Osagie
- Luke Puskedra
- Sheila Reid

=== Notable former athletes ===
The following athletes formerly competed in the past for the Oregon Track Club:

- Margaret Bailes
- Wade Bell
- Russell Wolf Brown
- Dyrol Burleson
- Sam Chelanga
- Bill Dellinger
- Ian Dobson
- Ashton Eaton
- Mo Farah
- Shalane Flanagan
- Cyrus Hostetler
- Evan Jager
- Lauren Johnson
- Will Leer
- Tyler Mulder
- Ciaran O'Lionaird
- Steve Prefontaine
- Lachlan Renshaw
- Galen Rupp
- Shem-Tov Sabag
- Chris Solinsky
- Nick Symmonds
- Alan Webb
- Andrew Wheating
- Mac Wilkins
- Jesse Williams

== Coaches ==
- Bill Bowerman
- Bill Dellinger
- Frank Gagliano
- Bob Newland
- Mark Rowland - current OTC Elite Head Coach
- Alberto Salazar (Nike Oregon Project)
- Jerry Schumacher (Bowerman Track Club)

== Nike relationship ==
The OTC has had a long-standing close relationship with Nike, Inc. over the years. This relationship is due mostly to the fact that one of Nike's founders was OTC founder Bill Bowerman. It is also because Nike's main founder Phil Knight was a middle-distance runner for the University of Oregon and had a close relationship with many of the athletes in the OTC. Throughout the years, Nike has contributed strongly to the OTC by supplying equipment and sponsoring competitions for athletes to compete against other track clubs across the nation. This relationship has greatly increased with the re-establishment of the OTC Elite.
