= Russell Wolf Brown =

American distance runner (born 1985)

Personal information
- Born: March 6, 1985 (age 41) Hanover, New Hampshire, U.S.

Sport
- Country: United States
- Events: Mile, 1500 meters
- College team: Stanford University
- Club: Oregon Track Club
- Turned pro: 2008

Achievements and titles
- Personal bests: 1500 m: 3:34.11; 1 mile: 3:51.45

Russell Wolf Brown (born March 6, 1985) is an American former professional athlete who competed in the 1 mile and 1500 meter events.

== Early life ==
Raised in Hanover, New Hampshire, Brown began running track events at age ten. He attended Hanover High School where he initially played lacrosse, soccer, and ice hockey. He won the 800 m at Hershey's National Final in 1999 and both the 3200 m relay and 800 m at USATF Junior Olympics in 2001. He anchored the 3200m Relay to wins at the USATF Junior Olympics in 2001, 2002 and 2003. Russell's 800 m split in the 2003 race was 1:49. In his sophomore year he was recruited by the cross country team. He began to focus exclusively on running after being impressed with the mature attitudes toward competition that he saw on the track team. In his junior year he was the New Hampshire individual class intermediate cross country state champion. The next year he won the New England 600 meter indoor title and finished third at the 2003 U.S. Junior National Championships. He also set the New Hampshire state high school record for the 800 meter race, which still stands to this day at 1:50.85. In the spring of his senior year, during the state championship meet against all other Class I schools in New Hampshire, Brown won the 400-, 800-, 1600- and 3,200-meter events.

== College career ==
Brown entered Stanford University in 2003 as a redshirt freshman. A political science major at Stanford, Brown later earned a master's degree in Sociology. Brown competed in the 2004 World Junior Championships in Athletics – Men's 1500 metres in 2004, finishing fifth in the 1,500 meters with a time of 3:49.02.

He saw limited success in the 1,500 meter event in his first two years of competition with Stanford. He reached the 1,500 meter final at the NCAA Outdoor Championships in 2005 and in 2006 he finished second in the 1,500 meters at the 2006 Pacific-10 Championships. He performed better indoors, placing third at the Mountain Pacific Sports Federation indoor mile event in 2005 before winning the event in 2006. In 2007 Brown finished third in the 1,500 meter event at the 2007 NCAA Outdoor Championships and won the 1,500 meter Pac–10 Championship. That year he also placed second in the mile at the NCAA Indoor Championships.

== Professional career ==
In February 2008 Brown became a professional. He soon joined the Oregon Track Club. Brown represented the United States at the 2008 IAAF World Indoor Championships – Men's 1500 metres in Valencia, Spain where he finished seventh in the 1,500 meters with a time of 3:47.19. He competed in the 2008 U.S. Olympic trials, but did not qualify for the Olympics. He trained to qualify for the 2012 Olympics, however.

The next season proved to be Brown's most successful as a professional. Before the season, he dealt with his injuries by taking extra time off and doing strengthening drills. He won the one-mile event at the Falmouth Road Race August 2010, beating Olympic Silver medalist Nick Willis. In February 2011 Brown finished first in the mile race at the New Balance Boston Indoor Grand Prix, defeating favorites Willis and Alan Webb in a personal best time of three minutes and fifty-four seconds. He broke Steve Scott's stadium record at the Mt. SAC Relays in April, running 3:35.70 minutes for the 1500 m in 2011.

Brown competed in the 2013 Maccabiah Games and won the silver medal in the 1500 m there.

== Personal life ==
Russell Brown is married to former Stanford University women's volleyball player Nji Nnamani, the younger sister of Ogonna Nnamani.
