= Jonathon Riley (runner) =

American runner (born 1978)

Personal information
- Born: December 29, 1978 (age 47) Brookline, Massachusetts, U.S.

Sport
- Country: United States
- Sport: Track
- Events: 1500 metres, Mile, 5000 metres
- College team: Stanford

Achievements and titles
- Personal bests: 1500 metres: 3:38.54; Mile: 3:57.07; 5000 metres: 13:19.92

Jonathon Riley (born December 29, 1978) is an American runner who specialized in middle-distance and long-distance disciplines in competitive track and field. He represented the United States in the men's 5000 metres at the 2004 Summer Olympics.

== Running career ==
=== High school ===
Riley transferred to Brookline High School in his junior year, for which he ran extraordinary times by his senior year. At an all-comers high school meet, after being tipped as one of only three high schoolers in the United States challenging the 4-minute mile barrier, Riley ran a 1500 metres race in 3:43.18.

=== Collegiate ===
Riley was recruited by Stanford. Despite having a star-studded track team, Riley managed to stand out and even set the school's record for the 3000 metres, which he ran in 7:46 (min:sec).

=== Post-collegiate ===
After four years with Stanford, Riley ran professionally for Nike, for which he ran personal bests of 3:57.07 in the mile and 13:19.92 in the 5000 meters disciplines. He qualified for the US Olympic team in 2004 and even ran the first heat of the men's 5000 metres at the 2004 Summer Olympics, but finished 14th of 18 competitors in the first heat and did not make it to the final round.
