= Elliott Heath =

American distance runner (born 1989)

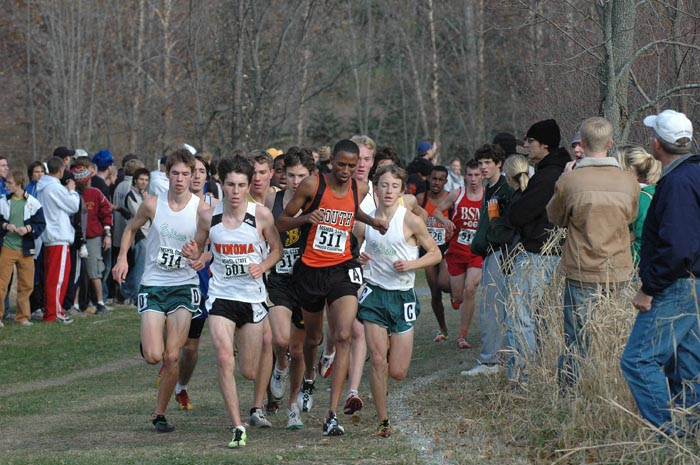
- Heath (with bib #501, left of Hassan Mead) at the 2006 Minnesota High School XC race

Personal information
- Born: February 4, 1989 (age 37) Winona, Minnesota, U.S.

Sport
- Sport: Track
- Events: 1500 meters, 5000 meters, 10,000 meters
- College team: Stanford
- Turned pro: 2012
- Retired: 2014

Achievements and titles
- Personal bests: 1500 meters: 3:39.27; Mile: 3:57.91; 3000 meters: 7:45.08; 5000 meters: 13:26.14; 10,000 meters: 28:47.69

Elliott Heath (born February 4, 1989) is an American runner who specialized in middle and long-distance disciplines. He competed at the 2012 US Olympic track trials for the 5000-meter race. He is the brother of Garrett Heath.

== Running career ==
Heath was inducted into the Winona High School Hall of Fame in 2018.

=== High school ===
Heath made an immediate impact upon joining Winona High School's track team under coach John Ruggeberg, having already taken up running from sixth grade. While a senior at Winona he was the 2007 U.S. Junior Cross Country champion, and finished third in the two mile at the 2007 Nike Outdoor Nationals with a personal best of 8:46.12, which is a Minnesota high school record.

=== Collegiate ===
Heath was accepted by Stanford in 2007, the same university for which his brother Garett competed as a long-distance runner. Coached by Jason Dunn while at Stanford, he placed first in the 3000-meter race at the 2011 NCAA Division I Indoor Track and Field Championships.

=== Post-collegiate ===
In 2012, Heath signed a professional contract with Nike and started being coached by Jerry Schumacher. At the 2012 US Olympic Trials for track and field, Heath placed seventh in the 5000-meter race.
