= Erica McLain =

American triple jumper

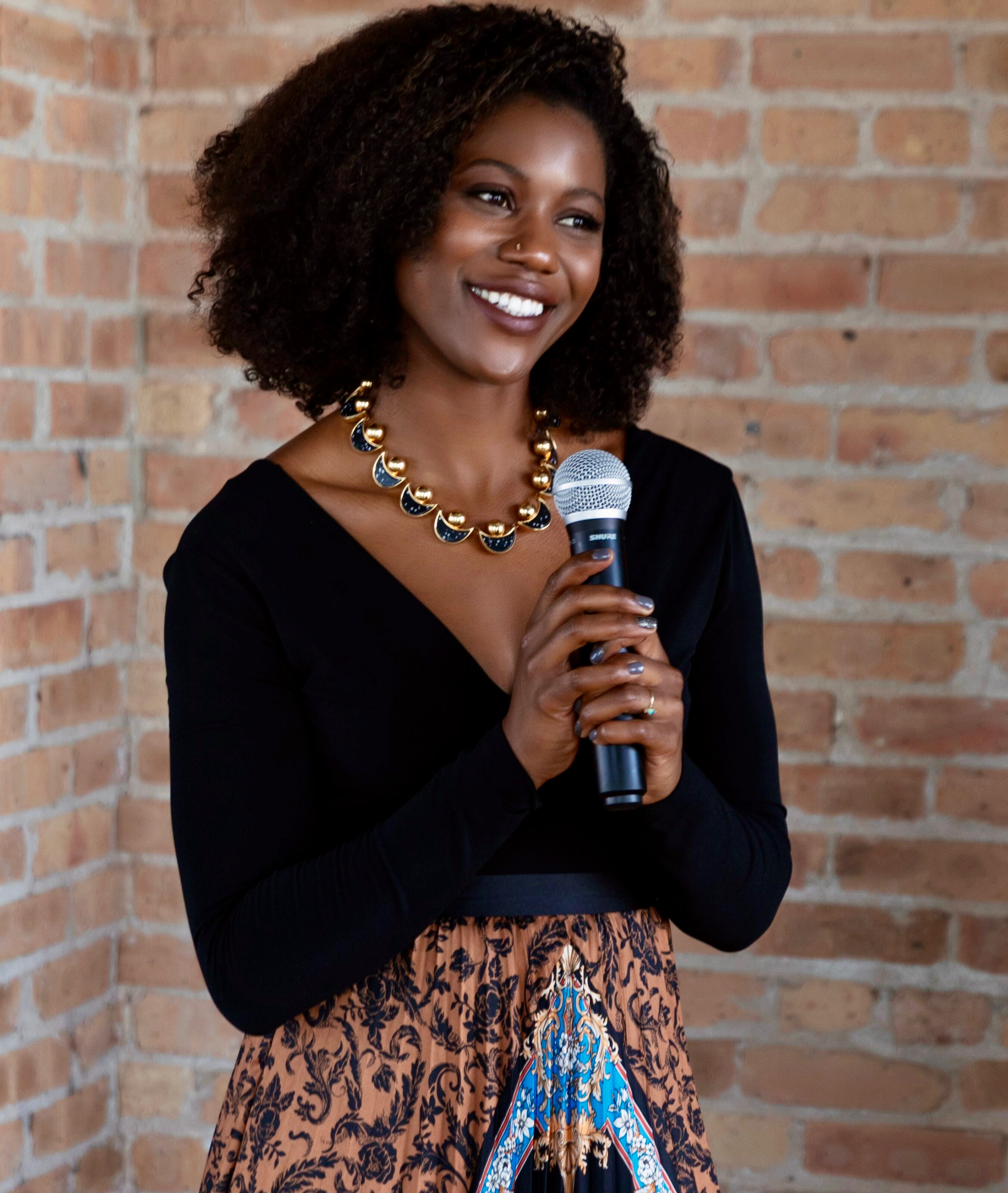
- Born: January 24, 1986 (age 40); Columbus, Ohio
- Education: Stanford University

Erica McLain (born January 24, 1986, in Columbus, Ohio) is an American triple jumper.

As a junior athlete, she also competed in the long jump. She finished twelfth at the 2002 World Junior Championships and eighth at the 2003 World Youth Championships. In the triple jump she finished seventh at the 2003 World Youth Championships and eleventh at the 2004 World Junior Championships. She competed at the 2005 World Championships and the 2008 Olympic Games without reaching the final.

Her personal best jump is 14.60 metres, achieved in June 2008 in Des Moines. She achieved 14.20 metres on the indoor track, achieved in March 2008 in Fayetteville.

McLain was the second winner of the ABC game show "The Hustler" broadcast on January 7, 2021.
