= Michael Ponikvar =

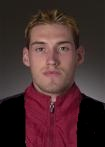

Personal information
- Nationality: Canadian
- Born: December 26, 1979 (age 46) St. Catharines, Ontario
- Height: 6 ft 9 in (2.06 m)
- Weight: 220 lb (100 kg)

Sport
- Sport: Track and field Basketball
- Event: High Jump
- College team: Stanford University

Achievements and titles
- Personal bests: 3× PAC-10 Champion (1999, 2001, 2002); 3× NCAA All-American (1999, 2001, 2002); NCAA Medalist; World Junior Championships Medalist; Pan American Games Junior Champion; Commonwealth Games Qualifier; World University Games Qualifier; 2x Olympic Games Qualifier - Slovenia; 2× Junior National Champion; 4× Ontario High School Champion(OFSAA); OFSAA Midget Record Holder; OFSAA Junior Record Holder; OFSAA Senior Record Holder; Canadian High School Record Holder
Medal record
Men's Athletics
Representing Canada
Pan American Junior Championships
Gold medal – first place	1997 Havana	High Jump
- Updated on March 2015

Michael Ponikvar (born December 26. 1979) is an orthodontist in Belleville, Ontario, and a former world-class track and field athlete from Canada, who is known for competing in the high jump.

== Biography ==
He is the Canadian high school record holder in the high jump and won his first Canadian Junior National Championship in 1997. This was also his first year competing internationally for the Canadian team as he won the gold medal in the high jump at the 1997 Pan American Junior Championships in Havana, Cuba and ranked #1 in the world for his age group (U19). The next year he competed at the 1998 World Junior Championships where he jumped the same height as the winner but finished fourth on countback. He then competed for the Canadian nation team at the XVI Commonwealth Games that were held in Kuala Lumpur, Malaysia. That same year he finished the season as the #1 high schooler in the world. A year later, he won the first of three consecutive Pac-10 conference championships in addition to receiving his first of three All-American honours at the NCAA division I track and field championships. In addition he represented Canada in the World University Games in Spain. In 2000, he redshirted his season at Stanford to train for the Olympics. After obtaining the Olympic qualifying mark, ankle surgery denied him a trip to the Sydney Olympic games. During the 2001 and 2002 seasons, Ponikvar earned his second and third All-American honours in addition to two more Pac-10 conference high jump titles, making a total of three conference titles while remaining undefeated at the championship event. In the 2002 season, he made the Olympic qualifying standard for the high jump. At the NCAA division I champions in Baton Rouge, Louisiana, Ponikvar jumped 7-4 1/2 to tie the national champion (Tora Harris of Princeton), but Harris was awarded the victory on fewer misses. Ponikvar settled for third place, but another All-American honour. Again after injuries and surgery, this time to his back, Ponikvar was prevented from competing in the rest of the season and ultimately ended his jumping career.

Ponikvar played basketball and jumped for Denis Morris High School in St. Catharines. As a basketball player he garnered acclaim when he won the Standard Tournament dunk competition at the age of 15 by dunking from the free throw line. The following year he won the same competition by jumping from the free throw line and dunking over a reporter from the St.Catharines standard. Overall, he was on many all-star teams and won several tournament MVP's in addition to being known as a dunk champion, who had early success as a member of championship central east team of the midget development league in Ontario. He helped his high school team win city championships in his last two years of high school as well as southern Ontario championships. He was selected to the Canadian Nike Basketball Camp that invited Canada's top basketball players to compete in a summer basketball camp. After obtaining a 4.0 GPA in high school he decided to forego NCAA basketball scholarships in order to focus on his jumping by accepting a full scholarship to Stanford University. He finished his career as a basketball player, before completely committing to high jump, as a first team all provincial basketball all-star as selected by the Toronto Star.

In track, Ponikvar accumulated many accolades. After his first year at Denis Morris he remained undefeated throughout his entire high school career including at the national level. He won the Ontario track and field championships 4 years consecutively. He also managed to win two national junior championships in addition to representing the Canadian team at the Pan American Junior National Championships, the World Junior Championships and the Commonwealth Games. He won the Pan American Junior Championships and tied for first but placed second due to count backs to the World Junior Championships. Strategically Ponikvar was a jumper with a 5 to 7 step short approach and took very limited amount of jumps. He had a habit of using the scissor kick technique to win competitions before using the traditional flop technique. Injuries prevented Ponikvar from training all year around and he never completed a full year of track and field competition. Prone to injury, Ponikvar retired from track and field at the age of 22, one year before his senior season at Stanford University. Ponikvar continued his education by obtaining his master's degree in Exercise Physiology before getting a doctorate in dental surgery followed by another master's degree in Cranial-facial Biology and a third master's degree in Cranial-facial Orthopedics and Orthodontics. He currently runs several orthodontic clinics east of Toronto. He has been ranked as one of the best orthodontists in the Ontario.
