= Grant Robison =

Former American track athlete

Personal information
- Born: September 27, 1978 (age 47) Englewood, Colorado, U.S.

Sport
- Country: United States
- Sport: Track
- Event: 1500 metres
- College team: Stanford

Achievements and titles
- Personal bests: 1500 metres: 3:35.75; Indoor Mile: 3:58.9
Medal record
Men's Athletics
Representing United States
Pan American Games
Bronze medal – third place	2003 Santo Domingo	1,500 metres

Grant Robison (born September 27, 1978) is an American retired track athlete, who competed in the middle distance running events. He represented the United States at the 2004 Summer Olympics. Robison won the bronze medal in the men's 1,500 metres at the 2003 Pan American Games. During college he ran for Stanford University.

== Running career ==
=== High school ===
Robison attended and ran at McMinnville High School, where he graduated in 1997. He left McMinnville as the all-time school record-holder for the 1500 metres and 3000 metres disciplines, having personal bests of 3:56.06 and 8:32.79, respectively.

=== Collegiate ===
Robison ran for Stanford University, a school with a prestigious track program. After running for the school's cross country team as a freshman in 2000, he went on a two-year Mormon mission. Robison made a return to collegiate track in 2002, and won the 1500-metre at the 2003 NCAA Div I Outdoor Track Championships with a time of 3:40.39.

=== Post-collegiate ===
Robison qualified for the 2004 Summer Olympics by satisfying the Olympic A norm, allowing him to go to the Olympics in spite of not finishing in the Olympic berths at the 2004 US Olympic Trials. In the men's 1500-meter race at the 2004 Summer Olympics, Robison did not qualify past the first round, finishing in 11th out of 14 athletes in his heat.
