= Michael Stember =

American track and field athlete (born 1978)

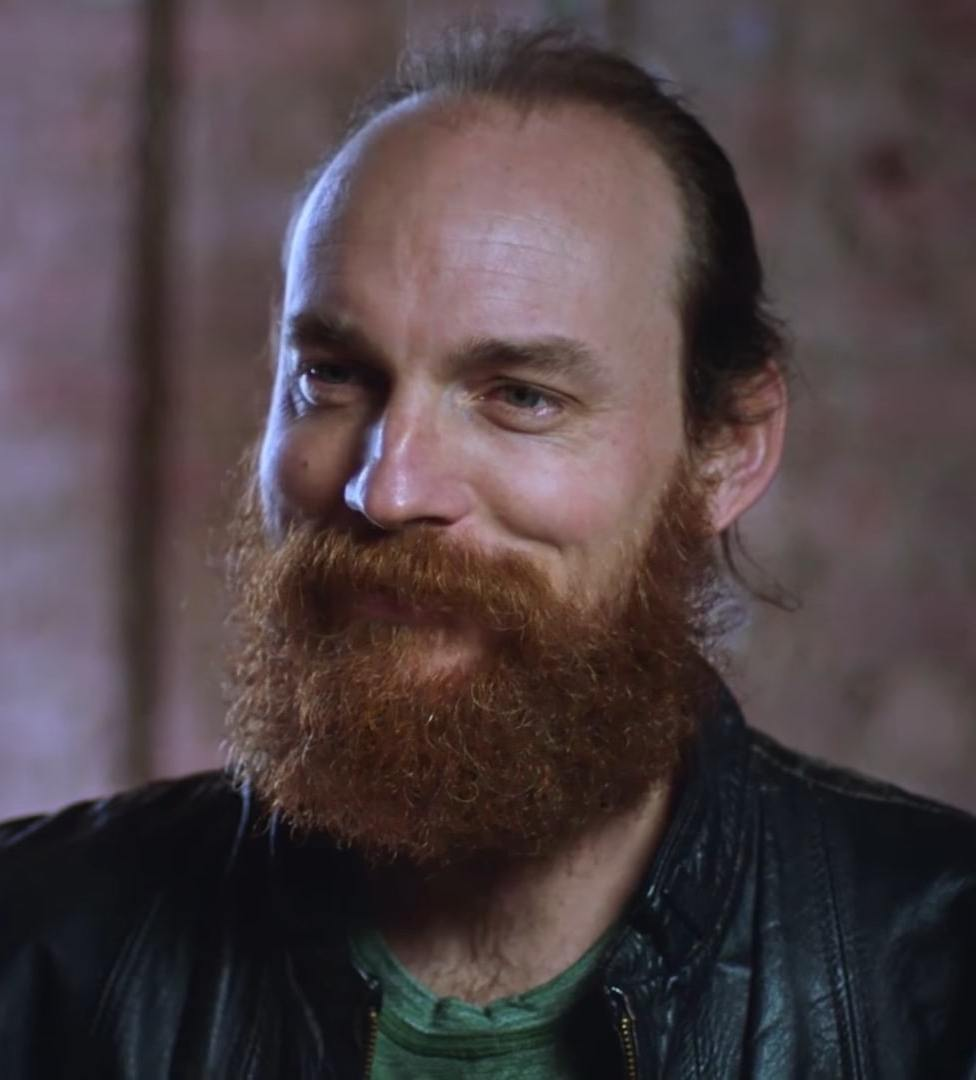
- Stember in 2017

Personal information
- Nationality: American
- Born: January 30, 1978 (age 48) Fair Oaks, California, U.S.
- Height: 5 ft 11 in (1.80 m)
- Weight: 155 lb (70 kg)

Sport
- Sport: Track
- Events: 800 metres, 1500 metres
- College team: Stanford

Achievements and titles
- Personal bests: 800 meters: 1:46.20; 1500 meters: 3:35.11
Medal record
Men's athletics (track and field)
Representing the United States
Pan American Games
Silver medal – second place	1999 Winnipeg	1500 m
Silver medal – second place	2003 Santo Domingo	1500 m
- Updated on May 5, 2012

Michael Stember (born January 30, 1978) is a track and field athlete from the United States who is known for his achievements in the middle distance events. His first international competition was winning the gold medal in the 1500 metres at the 1997 Pan American Junior Championships. He won a silver medal at the 1999 Pan American Games in the men's 1500 metres. He ran in the 2000 Summer Olympics in Sydney, Australia, where he qualified for the semi-finals but finished a non-qualifying 9th. He returned to the 2003 Pan American Games and repeated his silver medal in the men's 1500 metres. In 2004 he became the U.S. Indoor 800 m champion. In 2007–2008 he was a volunteer coach at UCLA. He later became a restaurant owner.

== Running career ==
=== High school ===
Stember ran for Jesuit High School. As a sophomore in 1994 at the CIF California State Meet he finished second in the 1600 metres to the future American marathon great Meb Keflezighi. He won the race outright as a junior (1995) and senior (1996). His 4:04.00 winning time in the 1995 CIF State Meet was the state 1600 meters record until 2001 when it was surpassed by Ryan Hall at 4:02:62. The impressive finish—starting after two laps—is depicted in a YouTube video named "Godspeed" which has been viewed more than 28 million times since its release in 2010. However, as fast as Stember was running, he had a habit of running strategically, always finishing with a devastating kick that demoralized his opponents. As a junior, it worked well because no athlete on that level could match his kick at any pace.

=== Collegiate ===
He carried this strategy to Stanford University, even though Vin Lananna tried to coax him into occasionally using other strategies. He scored 13 points for the team in 2000, with a second place in the 1500 and 4th place in the 800 metres as Stanford won the NCAA Men's Outdoor Track and Field Championship. Stember holds the Stanford records in both the 1500 metres and 800 metres and was named All American ten times. He ran the 800 metre leg on Stanford's "world record" claiming team for the unsanctioned Indoor "Distance Medley Relay".

=== International ===
In 1999, he was fourth in the World University Games, behind then-Kenyan Bernard Lagat. A year later, he was the third qualifier at the U.S. Olympic Trials, but had not achieved the A Standard. He spent the summer chasing the mark, achieving it at Herculis in one of the last opportunities before the Olympics. Stember ended up running the men's 1500 meters at the 2000 Summer Olympics, but did not make it to the final round.
