= Alicia Craig =

American long-distance runner

Alicia Shay
Personal information
- Nickname(s): Run and Gun
- Nationality: American
- Born: Alicia Craig; June 14, 1982 (age 43)
- Home town: Gillette, Wyoming

Sport
- Sport: Long-distance running

Alicia Craig, also known as Alicia Shay and Alicia Vargo (born June 14, 1982, in Gillette, Wyoming), is an American distance runner. She is a two-time NCAA 10,000 meter champion. In 2004, she set the women's collegiate 10,000-meter record in just her third race and repeated as winner the following year. She ran at Stanford University. Her husband Ryan Shay died November 3, 2007, while competing in the 2008 Olympic Marathon Trials.

In 2012, she returned to racing following a number of injuries that began even before she was widowed and in 2017 recorded the then Fastest Known Time for the Rim to Rim. In 2016, she married Chris Vargo.

== Honors ==
- 2007 Women's National 20K Champion
- 2004 Broke the NCAA women's record in the 10,000 meters
- 2004 All American in track and cross country
- 2003 All American in track and cross country
- 2002 Pac-10 and West Region Athlete of the Year
- 2002 All American in cross country
- High School four time All-state athlete in Gillette, WY
