= Donald Sage =

American track athlete (born 1981)

Personal information
- Nationality: United States
- Born: October 5, 1981 (age 45) Elmhurst, Illinois, U.S.

Sport
- Sport: Running
- Event: Middle distances
- College team: Stanford Cardinal
- Updated on 5 May 2012

Donald Sage (born October 5, 1981) is an American track athlete and the winner of the 2002 NCAA Outdoor 1500m championship.

== Background ==
Sage graduated from York Community High School in Elmhurst, Illinois in 2000, where he ran for legendary coach Joe Newton. He won state titles in cross country (1999) and track & field (1600m (1999 and 2000) and 3200m (1999 and 2000)). In the 2000 Prefontaine Classic Sage ran a 4:00.29 mile. That also made him the 2nd fastest high school runner to not break the 4 minute barrier. Sage attended Stanford University. He was a three time All-American in cross country, helping the Cardinal to 2 team championships (2002, 2003) and a seven time All-American in track, including his victory in the 2002 outdoor 1500m.

== Personal bests ==
Distance	Mark	Date
1500 m	3:39.17	2001
1 Mile	3:58.7	2000
5000 m	14:04.94	2001
10000 m	28:40.12	2002
