= Distance medley relay at the NCAA Division I Indoor Track and Field Championships =

The distance medley relay has been held at the NCAA Division I Indoor Track and Field Championships annually since 1967. Since 1997, the race consists of a 1200 meters leg followed by a 400 meters sprint, followed by an 800 meters leg and concluding with the 1600 meters anchor for a total distance of 4000 meters. Before 1997, the order of the legs was different, with the 800 m leg leading off and the 1200 m leg third. Before 1994, imperial analogues of the four legs were held instead, from 880 yards to 440 yards to 1320 yards to the mile run anchor.

Hand timing was used until 1975 and in 1980, while in all other years fully automatic timing was used. The race was not held in 1983 or from 1986 to 1993. The women's race began in 1994. Official relay splits were published by Flash Results beginning in 2008.

== Winners ==
Key
y=yards
A=Altitude assisted

Women's distance medley relay winners
Year	Athletes	Split	Team	Time	R.
1994	Kristine Westerby	2:10.6	Michigan Wolverines	11:08.60	
1994	Richelle Webb	54.1	Michigan Wolverines	11:08.60	
1994	Molly McClimon	3:24.4	Michigan Wolverines	11:08.60	
1994	Courtney Babcock	4:39.5	Michigan Wolverines	11:08.60	
1995	Tosha Woodward	2:07.6	Villanova Wildcats	11:11.98	
1995	Cathalina Staye	55.7	Villanova Wildcats	11:11.98	
1995	Becky Spies	3:26.0	Villanova Wildcats	11:11.98	
1995	Jennifer Rhines	4:42.7	Villanova Wildcats	11:11.98	
1996	Jenni Westphal	2:05.8	Wisconsin Badgers	11:08.91	
1996	Markesha McWilliams	54.8	Wisconsin Badgers	11:08.91	
1996	Janet Westphal	3:28.4	Wisconsin Badgers	11:08.91	
1996	Kathy Butler	4:39.9	Wisconsin Badgers	11:08.91	
1997	Maxine Clarke	3:29.2	Wisconsin Badgers	11:08.54	
1997	Ayana Wright	56.5	Wisconsin Badgers	11:08.54	
1997	Amy Ross	2:06.3	Wisconsin Badgers	11:08.54	
1997	Miesha Marzell	4:36.5	Wisconsin Badgers	11:08.54	
1998	Lisa Ouellet	3:23.6	Michigan Wolverines	11:03.28	
1998	Adrienne Hunter	56.4	Michigan Wolverines	11:03.28	
1998	Sarah Hamilton	2:05.8	Michigan Wolverines	11:03.28	
1998	Katie McGregor	4:37.5	Michigan Wolverines	11:03.28	
1999	Lisa Roder	3:29.7	Georgetown Hoyas	11:10.16	
1999	Carron Allen	54.4	Georgetown Hoyas	11:10.16	
1999	Katrina de Boer	2:07.5	Georgetown Hoyas	11:10.16	
1999	Autumn Fogg	4:38.6	Georgetown Hoyas	11:10.16	
2000	Sally Glynn	3:26.8	Stanford Cardinal	11:01.56	
2000	Jayna Smith	52.5	Stanford Cardinal	11:01.56	
2000	Lindsay Hyatt	2:06.7	Stanford Cardinal	11:01.56	
2000	Lauren Fleshman	4:35.6	Stanford Cardinal	11:01.56	
2001	Kerry Hils	3:27.5	Missouri Tigers	11:06.77	
2001	Ashley Wysong	54.9	Missouri Tigers	11:06.77	
2001	Sunny Gilbert	2:07.8	Missouri Tigers	11:06.77	
2001	Ann Marie Brooks	4:36.6	Missouri Tigers	11:06.77	
2002	Tiffany Burgess	3:25.2	UCLA Bruins	10:58.19	
2002	Monique Henderson	51.9	UCLA Bruins	10:58.19	
2002	Jessica Marr	2:08.1	UCLA Bruins	10:58.19	
2002	Lena Nilsson	4:33.0	UCLA Bruins	10:58.19	
2003	Erin Donohue	3:25.3	North Carolina Tar Heels	11:00.20	
2003	Anissa Gainey	51.9	North Carolina Tar Heels	11:00.20	
2003	Alice Schmidt	2:06.5	North Carolina Tar Heels	11:00.20	
2003	Shalane Flanagan	4:36.5	North Carolina Tar Heels	11:00.20	
2004	Brooke Novak	3:26.5	Tennessee Volunteers	11:06.07	
2004	DeeDee Trotter	52.1	Tennessee Volunteers	11:06.07	
2004	Nicole Cook	2:04.1	Tennessee Volunteers	11:06.07	
2004	Lindsay Hyatt	4:43.4	Tennessee Volunteers	11:06.07	
2005	Nicole Edwards	3:25.0	Michigan Wolverines	11:08.24	
2005	Sierra Hauser-Price	54.5	Michigan Wolverines	11:08.24	
2005	Theresa Feldkamp	2:10.5	Michigan Wolverines	11:08.24	
2005	Lindsey Gallo	4:38.2	Michigan Wolverines	11:08.24	
2006	Megan Kaltenbach	3:23.9	North Carolina Tar Heels	11:01.97	
2006	Danielle Rodgers	55.4	North Carolina Tar Heels	11:01.97	
2006	Georgia Kloss	2:04.7	North Carolina Tar Heels	11:01.97	
2006	Brianna Felnagle	4:38.0	North Carolina Tar Heels	11:01.97	
2007	Megan Kaltenbach	3:26.07	North Carolina Tar Heels	10:59.46	
2007	Tyra Johnson	55.02	North Carolina Tar Heels	10:59.46	
2007	Georgia Kloss	2:05.34	North Carolina Tar Heels	10:59.46	
2007	Brie Felnagle	4:33.03	North Carolina Tar Heels	10:59.46	
2008	Brittany Sheffey	3:26.90	Tennessee Volunteers	11:01.97	
2008	Brittany Jones	53.19	Tennessee Volunteers	11:01.97	
2008	Phoebe Wright	2:06.55	Tennessee Volunteers	11:01.97	
2008	Sarah Brown	4:35.34	Tennessee Volunteers	11:01.97	
2009	Phoebe Wright	3:23.18	Tennessee Volunteers	10:50.98	
2009	Brittany Jones	53.51	Tennessee Volunteers	10:50.98	
2009	Chanelle Price	2:03.18	Tennessee Volunteers	10:50.98	
2009	Sarah Brown	4:31.11	Tennessee Volunteers	10:50.98	
2010	Phoebe Wright	3:22.21	Tennessee Volunteers	10:58.37	
2010	Ellen Wortham	54.07	Tennessee Volunteers	10:58.37	
2010	Chanelle Price	2:06.12	Tennessee Volunteers	10:58.37	
2010	Brittany Sheffey	4:35.97	Tennessee Volunteers	10:58.37	
2011	Emily Lipari	3:21.83	Villanova Wildcats	10:52.52	
2011	Christie Verdier	53.73	Villanova Wildcats	10:52.52	
2011	Ariann Neutts	2:07.07	Villanova Wildcats	10:52.52	
2011	Sheila Reid	4:29.91	Villanova Wildcats	10:52.52	
2012	Chelsea Orr	3:27.48	Washington Huskies	11:05.20	
2012	Jordan Carlson	54.16	Washington Huskies	11:05.20	
2012	Baylee Mires	2:09.55	Washington Huskies	11:05.20	
2012	Katie Flood	4:34.02	Washington Huskies	11:05.20	
2013	Rebecca Addison	3:24.04	Michigan Wolverines	10:56.46	
2013	Maya Long	54.86	Michigan Wolverines	10:56.46	
2013	Jillian Smith	2:05.28	Michigan Wolverines	10:56.46	
2013	Amanda Eccleston	4:32.29	Michigan Wolverines	10:56.46	
2014	Grace Heymsfield	3:28.04	Arkansas Razorbacks	11:05.83 A	
2014	Chrishuna Williams	52.55	Arkansas Razorbacks	11:05.83 A	
2014	Stephanie Brown	2:05.00	Arkansas Razorbacks	11:05.83 A	
2014	Dominique Scott	4:40.24	Arkansas Razorbacks	11:05.83 A	
2015	Jessica Kamilos	3:22.87	Arkansas Razorbacks	10:51.89	
2015	Sparkle McKnight	52.84	Arkansas Razorbacks	10:51.89	
2015	Therese Haiss	2:07.29	Arkansas Razorbacks	10:51.89	
2015	Dominique Scott	4:28.89	Arkansas Razorbacks	10:51.89	
2016	Andrea Keklak	3:24.11	Georgetown Hoyas	10:57.21	
2016	Heather Martin	54.04	Georgetown Hoyas	10:57.21	
2016	Emma Keenan	2:05.13	Georgetown Hoyas	10:57.21	
2016	Katrina Coogan	4:33.95	Georgetown Hoyas	10:57.21	
2017	Tabor Scholl	3:27.22	Colorado Buffaloes	11:00.34	
2017	Elissa Mann	56.40	Colorado Buffaloes	11:00.34	
2017	Sage Hurta	2:05.02	Colorado Buffaloes	11:00.34	
2017	Dani Jones	4:31.71	Colorado Buffaloes	11:00.34	
2018	Jessica Hull	3:19.97	Oregon Ducks	10:51.99	
2018	Venessa D'Arpino	54.17	Oregon Ducks	10:51.99	
2018	Susan Ejore	2:04.18	Oregon Ducks	10:51.99	
2018	Lilli Burdon	4:33.67	Oregon Ducks	10:51.99	
2019	Amanda Gehrich	3:26.18	Oregon Ducks	10:53.43	
2019	Makenzie Dunmore	52.89	Oregon Ducks	10:53.43	
2019	Susan Ejore	2:03.52	Oregon Ducks	10:53.43	
2019	Jessica Hull	4:38.86	Oregon Ducks	10:53.43	
2021	Olivia Hoj	3:21.92	BYU Cougars	10:52.96	
2021	Alena Ellsworth	52.41	BYU Cougars	10:52.96	
2021	Lauren Ellsworth	2:05.74	BYU Cougars	10:52.96	
2021	Courtney Wayment	4:32.90	BYU Cougars	10:52.96	
2022	Isabel Van Camp	3:22.76	Arkansas Razorbacks	10:51.37	
2022	Paris Peoples	52.65	Arkansas Razorbacks	10:51.37	
2022	Krissy Gear	2:03.76	Arkansas Razorbacks	10:51.37	
2022	Logan Jolly	4:32.21	Arkansas Razorbacks	10:51.37	
2023	Melissa Tanaka	3:23.2	Stanford Cardinal	10:56.34 A	
2023	Maya Valmon	51.91	Stanford Cardinal	10:56.34 A	
2023	Roisin Willis	2:02.75	Stanford Cardinal	10:56.34 A	
2023	Juliette Whittaker	4:38.67	Stanford Cardinal	10:56.34 A	
2024	Sadie Sargent	3:20.65	BYU Cougars	10:51.42	
2024	Sami Oblad	55.50	BYU Cougars	10:51.42	
2024	Carlee Hansen	2:07.50	BYU Cougars	10:51.42	
2024	Riley Chamberlain	4:27.78	BYU Cougars	10:51.42	
2025	Jenna Hutchins	3:21.61	BYU Cougars	10:45.34	
2025	Sami Oblad	52.10	BYU Cougars	10:45.34	
2025	Tessa Buswell	2:06.52	BYU Cougars	10:45.34	
2025	Riley Chamberlain	4:25.12	BYU Cougars	10:45.34	
2026	Juliet Cherubet	3:19.35	Oregon Ducks	10:48.76	
2026	Lakely Doht-Barron	55.20	Oregon Ducks	10:48.76	
2026	Şilan Ayyıldız	2:04.42	Oregon Ducks	10:48.76	
2026	Wilma Nielsen	4:29.81	Oregon Ducks	10:48.76	

Men's distance medley relay winners
Year	Athletes	Split	Team	Time	R.
1967 (Note: Nightingale's split reported as 4:02.0 by The Times Herald)	Charles Harper	1:53.9 y	Kansas State Wildcats	9:44.6 y	
1967	Terry Holbrook	50.8 y	Kansas State Wildcats	9:44.6 y	
1967	Wes Dutton	2:58.3 y	Kansas State Wildcats	9:44.6 y	
1967	Conrad Nightingale	4:01.6 y	Kansas State Wildcats	9:44.6 y	
1968 (Note: Winning time reported as 9:49.6 by Track & Field News)	Charles Messenger	1:52.3 y	Villanova Wildcats	9:49.5 y	
1968	Bob Whitehead	50.3 y	Villanova Wildcats	9:49.5 y	
1968	Tom Donnelly	3:00.1 y	Villanova Wildcats	9:49.5 y	
1968	Frank Murphy	4:06.8 y	Villanova Wildcats	9:49.5 y	
1969	Andy O'Reilly	1:52.2 y	Villanova Wildcats	9:45.8 y	
1969	Ernie Bradshaw	50.6 y	Villanova Wildcats	9:45.8 y	
1969	Chris Mason	2:58.4 y	Villanova Wildcats	9:45.8 y	
1969	Frank Murphy	4:04.6 y	Villanova Wildcats	9:45.8 y	
1970	John Lovett	1:54.1 y	Manhattan Jaspers	9:49.2 y	
1970	Mike Kenny	49.6 y	Manhattan Jaspers	9:49.2 y	
1970	Al Novell	2:58.4 y	Manhattan Jaspers	9:49.2 y	
1970	Tom Donahue	4:07.1 y	Manhattan Jaspers	9:49.2 y	
1971	Ken Silay		Pittsburgh Panthers	9:45.7 y	
1971	Dorel Watley		Pittsburgh Panthers	9:45.7 y	
1971	Mike Schurko		Pittsburgh Panthers	9:45.7 y	
1971	Jerry Richey	4:03.1 y	Pittsburgh Panthers	9:45.7 y	
1972	Craig MacDonald	1:56.6 y	Bowling Green Falcons	9:49.5 y	
1972	Ted Farver	50.3 y	Bowling Green Falcons	9:49.5 y	
1972	Sid Sink	3:00.1 y	Bowling Green Falcons	9:49.5 y	
1972	Dave Wottle	4:02.5 y	Bowling Green Falcons	9:49.5 y	
1973	John Lovett	1:53.2 y	Manhattan Jaspers	9:43.8 y	
1973	Ray Johnson	50.4 y	Manhattan Jaspers	9:43.8 y	
1973	Joe Savage	2:55.9 y	Manhattan Jaspers	9:43.8 y	
1973	Tony Colon	4:04.3 y	Manhattan Jaspers	9:43.8 y	
1974	Mike Rabuse	1:56.6 y	Missouri Tigers	9:44.9 y	
1974	Jim Crawford	48.9 y	Missouri Tigers	9:44.9 y	
1974	Dave Rogles	2:58.3 y	Missouri Tigers	9:44.9 y	
1974	Charles McMullen	4:01.1 y	Missouri Tigers	9:44.9 y	
1975 (Note: Settle's split reported as 2:53.7 by The Des Moines Register)	Jim Hinchliffe	1:55.0 y	Kansas State Wildcats	9:48.2 y	
1975	Lennie Harrison	49.5 y	Kansas State Wildcats	9:48.2 y	
1975	Ted Settle	2:58.5 y	Kansas State Wildcats	9:48.2 y	
1975	Jeff Schemmel	4:05.2 y	Kansas State Wildcats	9:48.2 y	
1976	Joe Gichongeri	1:54.3 y	UTEP Miners	9:43.16 y	
1976	Paul Njoroge	50.1 y	UTEP Miners	9:43.16 y	
1976	James Munyala	2:59.1 y	UTEP Miners	9:43.16 y	
1976	Wilson Waigwa	3:59.6 y	UTEP Miners	9:43.16 y	
1977	Fred Ongaga	1:53.9 y	UTEP Miners	9:43.11 y	
1977	Paul Njoroge	50.4 y	UTEP Miners	9:43.11 y	
1977	Frank Munene	2:56.1 y	UTEP Miners	9:43.11 y	
1977	James Munyala	4:02.7 y	UTEP Miners	9:43.11 y	
1978	Kim Coombs	1:53.3 y	BYU Cougars	9:46.24 y	
1978	Alan Schultz	49.2 y	BYU Cougars	9:46.24 y	
1978	Jay Woods	2:59.7 y	BYU Cougars	9:46.24 y	
1978	Kevin Hyde	4:04.1 y	BYU Cougars	9:46.24 y	
1979	Solomon Hunter	1:55.6 y	Tennessee Volunteers	9:47.1 y	
1979	Mark Barlow	49.2 y	Tennessee Volunteers	9:47.1 y	
1979	Richard Hadler	2:59.0 y	Tennessee Volunteers	9:47.1 y	
1979	Keith Young	4:03.3 y	Tennessee Volunteers	9:47.1 y	
1980	John Hunter	1:52.4 y	Villanova Wildcats	9:42.22 y	
1980	Tim Robinson	49.8 y	Villanova Wildcats	9:42.22 y	
1980	Mike England	2:58.5 y	Villanova Wildcats	9:42.22 y	
1980	Sydney Maree	4:01.3 y	Villanova Wildcats	9:42.22 y	
1981	John Borgese	1:57.6 y	Villanova Wildcats	9:47.20 y	
1981	Willie Sydnor	50.3 y	Villanova Wildcats	9:47.20 y	
1981	Marcus O'Sullivan	2:58.1 y	Villanova Wildcats	9:47.20 y	
1981	Sydney Maree	4:01.2 y	Villanova Wildcats	9:47.20 y	
1982 (Note: McCabe's split reported as 49.9 and Gregorek's split reported as 4:01.8 by Newsday)	John Pedati	1:56.0 y	Georgetown Hoyas	9:45.97 y	
1982	Patrick McCabe	50.2 y	Georgetown Hoyas	9:45.97 y	
1982	Kevin King	2:58.1 y	Georgetown Hoyas	9:45.97 y	
1982	John Gregorek	4:01.7 y	Georgetown Hoyas	9:45.97 y	
1984	Joe Codrington	1:53.5	Eastern Michigan Eagles	9:40.18	
1984	Erik Frederick	47.6	Eastern Michigan Eagles	9:40.18	
1984	Dan Sahmiyeh	2:57.7	Eastern Michigan Eagles	9:40.18	
1984	Earl Jones	4:01.4	Eastern Michigan Eagles	9:40.18	
1985	Patrick Ames	1:52.3	Wisconsin Badgers	9:39.40	
1985	Robert Hackett	47.4	Wisconsin Badgers	9:39.40	
1985	John Easker	2:57.4	Wisconsin Badgers	9:39.40	
1985	Tim Hacker	4:02.3	Wisconsin Badgers	9:39.40	
1994	Niall Burton	1:51.3	Arkansas Razorbacks	9:30.07	
1994	Calvin Davis	45.7	Arkansas Razorbacks	9:30.07	
1994	Brian Baker	2:56.8	Arkansas Razorbacks	9:30.07	
1994	Graham Hood	3:56.3	Arkansas Razorbacks	9:30.07	
1995	Nick Karfonta	1:52.1	Michigan Wolverines	9:34.44	
1995	Trinity Townsend	47.1	Michigan Wolverines	9:34.44	
1995	Ian Forsyth	2:58.1	Michigan Wolverines	9:34.44	
1995	Kevin Sullivan	3:57.1	Michigan Wolverines	9:34.44	
1996	Alex Lamme	1:52.9	Nebraska Cornhuskers	9:32.13	
1996	Miklos Roth	47.9	Nebraska Cornhuskers	9:32.13	
1996	Jonah Kiptarus	2:53.1	Nebraska Cornhuskers	9:32.13	
1996	Balazs Tolgyesi	3:58.1	Nebraska Cornhuskers	9:32.13	
1997 (Note: Leadoff listed as Miklos Aspari by the USTFCCCA archive)	Miklós Árpási	2:59.7	George Mason Patriots	9:32.27	
1997	Francis Ogola	47.6	George Mason Patriots	9:32.27	
1997	O'Neil Duncan	1:47.9	George Mason Patriots	9:32.27	
1997	Julius Achon	3:57.1	George Mason Patriots	9:32.27	
1998	Eric Kamau	2:55.5	Washington State Cougars	9:29.54	
1998	Guillermo Macias	47.6	Washington State Cougars	9:29.54	
1998	Rasto Kiplangat	1:47.7	Washington State Cougars	9:29.54	
1998	Bernard Lagat	3:58.7	Washington State Cougars	9:29.54	
1999	Jess Strutzel	2:55.9	UCLA Bruins	9:33.17	
1999	Brian Fell	47.2	UCLA Bruins	9:33.17	
1999	Michael Granville	1:49.4	UCLA Bruins	9:33.17	
1999	Mark Hauser	4:00.7	UCLA Bruins	9:33.17	
2000	Gabe Jennings	2:52.1	Stanford Cardinal	9:28.83	
2000	Evan Kelty	48.3	Stanford Cardinal	9:28.83	
2000	Michael Stember	1:48.4	Stanford Cardinal	9:28.83	
2000	Jonathan Riley	4:00.0	Stanford Cardinal	9:28.83	
2001	Donald Sage	2:55.6	Stanford Cardinal	9:30.01	
2001	Mark Hassell	48.5	Stanford Cardinal	9:30.01	
2001	Jonathan Stevens	1:49.4	Stanford Cardinal	9:30.01	
2001	Gabe Jennings	3:56.5	Stanford Cardinal	9:30.01	
2002	Ryan Hayden	2:56.1	Villanova Wildcats	9:31.00	
2002	Michael Brown	46.3	Villanova Wildcats	9:31.00	
2002	Jason Jabaut	1:50.2	Villanova Wildcats	9:31.00	
2002	Adrian Blincoe	3:58.4	Villanova Wildcats	9:31.00	
2003	Ryan Hayden	2:55.1	Villanova Wildcats	9:29.12	
2003	Nicholas O'Brien	47.1	Villanova Wildcats	9:29.12	
2003	Paul Moser	1:49.8	Villanova Wildcats	9:29.12	
2003	Adrian Blincoe	3:57.1	Villanova Wildcats	9:29.12	
2004	Nate Brannen	2:54.5	Michigan Wolverines	9:27.77	
2004	Darnell Talbert	47.4	Michigan Wolverines	9:27.77	
2004	Andrew Ellerton	1:48.4	Michigan Wolverines	9:27.77	
2004	Nick Willis	3:57.5	Michigan Wolverines	9:27.77	
2005	Rondell Ruff	2:56.7	Michigan Wolverines	9:30.82	
2005	Stan Waithe	46.2	Michigan Wolverines	9:30.82	
2005	Andrew Ellerton	1:50.0	Michigan Wolverines	9:30.82	
2005	Nate Brannen	3:57.9	Michigan Wolverines	9:30.82	
2006 (Note: Listed as Adam Perkins, Dodson, Roe, Ahmed by the USTFCCCA archive)	Chris Barnicle	2:58.5	Arkansas Razorbacks	9:37.02	
2006	Jeremy Dodson	47.7	Arkansas Razorbacks	9:37.02	
2006	Brian Roe	1:48.2	Arkansas Razorbacks	9:37.02	
2006	Said Ahmed	4:02.6	Arkansas Razorbacks	9:37.02	
2007	Garrett Heath	2:56.89	Stanford Cardinal	9:33.64	
2007	Zach Chandy	47.06	Stanford Cardinal	9:33.64	
2007	Michael Garcia	1:48.82	Stanford Cardinal	9:33.64	
2007	Russell Wolf Brown	4:00.87	Stanford Cardinal	9:33.64	
2008	Jacob Hernandez	2:54.20	Texas Longhorns	9:32.04	
2008	Danzell Fortson	46.24	Texas Longhorns	9:32.04	
2008	Tevan Everett	1:50.86	Texas Longhorns	9:32.04	
2008	Leo Manzano	4:00.76	Texas Longhorns	9:32.04	
2009	Andrew Acosta	2:56.55	Oregon Ducks	9:29.59	
2009	Chad Barlow	47.14	Oregon Ducks	9:29.59	
2009	Andrew Wheating	1:48.83	Oregon Ducks	9:29.59	
2009	Galen Rupp	3:57.07	Oregon Ducks	9:29.59	
2010	AJ Acosta	2:57.04	Oregon Ducks	9:36.87	
2010	Chad Barlow	48.39	Oregon Ducks	9:36.87	
2010	Travis Thompson	1:50.22	Oregon Ducks	9:36.87	
2010	Andrew Wheating	4:01.23	Oregon Ducks	9:36.87	
2011	Brian Weirich	2:57.28	BYU Cougars	9:29.28	
2011	Chris Carter	47.83	BYU Cougars	9:29.28	
2011	Justin Hedin	1:48.05	BYU Cougars	9:29.28	
2011	Miles Batty	3:56.14	BYU Cougars	9:29.28	
2012	Johnathan Shawel	2:57.46	Notre Dame Fighting Irish	9:35.48	
2012	Christopher Giesting	46.03	Notre Dame Fighting Irish	9:35.48	
2012	Randall Babb	1:51.34	Notre Dame Fighting Irish	9:35.48	
2012	Jeremy Rae	4:00.67	Notre Dame Fighting Irish	9:35.48	
2013	Michael Williams	2:56.66	Princeton Tigers	9:33.01	
2013	Austin Hollimon	46.35	Princeton Tigers	9:33.01	
2013	Russell Dinkins	1:48.92	Princeton Tigers	9:33.01	
2013	Peter Callahan	4:01.11	Princeton Tigers	9:33.01	
2014	Marco Bertolotti	2:58.61	Stanford Cardinal	9:37.63 A	
2014	Steven Solomon	45.75	Stanford Cardinal	9:37.63 A	
2014	Luke Lefebure	1:49.30	Stanford Cardinal	9:37.63 A	
2014	Michael Atchoo	4:03.99	Stanford Cardinal	9:37.63 A	
2015	Colby Alexander	2:59.05	Oregon Ducks	9:30.53	
2015	Marcus Chambers	46.82	Oregon Ducks	9:30.53	
2015	Niki Franzmair	1:46.98	Oregon Ducks	9:30.53	
2015	Edward Cheserek	3:57.68	Oregon Ducks	9:30.53	
2016	Matthew Maton	2:58.58	Oregon Ducks	9:27.27	
2016	Ben Thiel	48.04	Oregon Ducks	9:27.27	
2016	Grant Grosvenor	1:47.82	Oregon Ducks	9:27.27	
2016	Edward Cheserek	3:52.84	Oregon Ducks	9:27.27	
2017	Craig Engels	2:56.47	Ole Miss Rebels	9:31.32	
2017	Nick DeRay	49.13	Ole Miss Rebels	9:31.32	
2017	Sean Tobin	1:47.92	Ole Miss Rebels	9:31.32	
2017	Robert Domanic	3:57.81	Ole Miss Rebels	9:31.32	
2018	Vincent Ciattei	2:57.47	Virginia Tech Hokies	9:30.76	
2018	Gregory Chiles	48.43	Virginia Tech Hokies	9:30.76	
2018	Patrick Joseph	1:46.23	Virginia Tech Hokies	9:30.76	
2018	Neil Gourley	3:58.64	Virginia Tech Hokies	9:30.76	
2019	Dylan Jacobs	2:57.48	Notre Dame Fighting Irish	9:31.55	
2019	Edward Cheatham	48.17	Notre Dame Fighting Irish	9:31.55	
2019	Samuel Voelz	1:49.89	Notre Dame Fighting Irish	9:31.55	
2019	Yared Nuguse	3:56.03	Notre Dame Fighting Irish	9:31.55	
2021	Reed Brown	2:52.73	Oregon Ducks	9:19.98	
2021	Xavier Nairne	47.58	Oregon Ducks	9:19.98	
2021	Charlie Hunter	1:46.70	Oregon Ducks	9:19.98	
2021	Cooper Teare	3:52.99	Oregon Ducks	9:19.98	
2022	Cruz Gomez	2:56.20	Texas Longhorns	9:25.20	
2022	Willington Wright	45.96	Texas Longhorns	9:25.20	
2022	Crayton Carrozza	1:47.46	Texas Longhorns	9:25.20	
2022	Yaseen Abdalla	3:55.59	Texas Longhorns	9:25.20	
2023	Fouad Messaoudi	2:53.76	Oklahoma State Cowboys	9:28.77 A	
2023	Charlie Bartholomew	46.67	Oklahoma State Cowboys	9:28.77 A	
2023	Juan Diego Castro	1:47.85	Oklahoma State Cowboys	9:28.77 A	
2023	Ryan Schoppe	4:00.50	Oklahoma State Cowboys	9:28.77 A	
2024	Brian Musau	2:54.86	Oklahoma State Cowboys	9:25.24	
2024	DeJuana McArthur	45.60	Oklahoma State Cowboys	9:25.24	
2024	Mehdi Yanouri	1:49.20	Oklahoma State Cowboys	9:25.24	
2024	Ryan Schoppe	3:55.59	Oklahoma State Cowboys	9:25.24	
2025	Wes Porter	2:52.97	Virginia Cavaliers	9:15.12	
2025	Alex Sherman	46.54	Virginia Cavaliers	9:15.12	
2025	Conor Murphy	1:47.50	Virginia Cavaliers	9:15.12	
2025	Gary Martin	3:48.12	Virginia Cavaliers	9:15.12	
2026	Rheinhardt Harrison	2:49.80	Northern Arizona Lumberjacks	9:19.95	
2026	Josiah Johnson	45.83	Northern Arizona Lumberjacks	9:19.95	
2026	Tor Hotung-Davidsen	1:47.20	Northern Arizona Lumberjacks	9:19.95	
2026	Colin Sahlman	3:57.14	Northern Arizona Lumberjacks	9:19.95	
