= North Carolina Tar Heels track and field =

College track and field team

- University: University of North Carolina at Chapel Hill
- Head coach: Chris Miltenberg
- Conference: ACC
- Location: Chapel Hill, North Carolina
- Outdoor track: Carolina Track & Field Complex
- Nickname: Tar Heels
- Colors: Carolina blue and white

The North Carolina Tar Heels track and field team is the track and field program that represents University of North Carolina at Chapel Hill. The Tar Heels compete in NCAA Division I as a member of the Atlantic Coast Conference. The team is based in Chapel Hill, North Carolina at the Carolina Track & Field Complex.

The program is coached by Chris Miltenberg. The track and field program officially encompasses four teams because the NCAA considers men's and women's indoor track and field and outdoor track and field as separate sports.

Laura Gerraughty is the only Tar Heel to have won four individual NCAA titles, which she accomplished in the shot put from 2003 to 2006.

== Postseason ==
As of 2024, a total of 70 men and 49 women have achieved individual first-team All-American status at the Division I men's outdoor, women's outdoor, men's indoor, or women's indoor national championships.

First team All-Americans
| Team | Championships | Name | Event | Place | Ref. |
|---|---|---|---|---|---|
| Men's | 1927 Outdoor | Galen Elliott | Mile run | 2nd | |
| Men's | 1928 Outdoor | Galen Elliott | Mile run | 4th | |
| Men's | 1930 Outdoor | Charles Farmer | 200 meters | 4th | |
| Men's | 1934 Outdoor | Harry Williamson | Mile run | 4th | |
| Men's | 1934 Outdoor | Ralston Legore | Javelin throw | 3rd | |
| Men's | 1935 Outdoor | Harry Williamson | Mile run | 2nd | |
| Men's | 1938 Outdoor | James Davis | Mile run | 5th | |
| Men's | 1939 Outdoor | Bill Corpening | 110 meters hurdles | 3rd | |
| Men's | 1946 Outdoor | Floyd Simmons | 220 yards hurdles | >6th | |
| Men's | 1948 Outdoor | Jack Miller | 3000 meters steeplechase | 6th | |
| Men's | 1949 Outdoor | Bob Kirk | Javelin throw | 8th | |
| Men's | 1950 Outdoor | Bill Albans | 220 yards hurdles | 1st | |
| Men's | 1950 Outdoor | Bill Albans | 110 meters hurdles | 3rd | |
| Men's | 1950 Outdoor | Bill Albans | Long jump | 3rd | |
| Men's | 1950 Outdoor | Bob Kirk | Javelin throw | 7th | |
| Men's | 1955 Outdoor | Jim Beatty | 3000 meters | 2nd | |
| Men's | 1956 Outdoor | Jim Beatty | 5000 meters | 2nd | |
| Men's | 1957 Outdoor | Dave Scurlock | 800 meters | 3rd | |
| Men's | 1958 Outdoor | Dave Scurlock | 800 meters | 8th | |
| Men's | 1958 Outdoor | Wayne Bishop | 3000 meters | 8th | |
| Men's | 1967 Indoor | Milte Williams | Mile run | 5th | |
| Men's | 1971 Outdoor | Tony Waldrop | 800 meters | 8th | |
| Men's | 1971 Outdoor | Darryl Kelly | Triple jump | 8th | |
| Men's | 1972 Indoor | Tony Waldrop | 1000 meters | 4th | |
| Men's | 1972 Indoor | Reggie McAfee | Mile run | 2nd | |
| Men's | 1972 Outdoor | Tony Waldrop | 800 meters | 3rd | |
| Men's | 1972 Outdoor | Lennox Stewart | 800 meters | 8th | |
| Men's | 1973 Indoor | Tony Waldrop | 1000 meters | 1st | |
| Men's | 1973 Indoor | Reggie McAfee | Mile run | 2nd | |
| Men's | 1973 Outdoor | Tony Waldrop | Mile run | 2nd | |
| Men's | 1973 Outdoor | Reggie McAfee | Mile run | 3rd | |
| Men's | 1974 Indoor | Tony Waldrop | Mile run | 1st | |
| Men's | 1974 Outdoor | Tony Waldrop | Mile run | 3rd | |
| Men's | 1976 Indoor | Ralph King | Mile run | 5th | |
| Men's | 1977 Outdoor | Ralph King | 5000 meters | 6th | |
| Men's | 1978 Indoor | Ralph King | 3000 meters | 5th | |
| Men's | 1978 Outdoor | Ralph King | 5000 meters | 5th | |
| Men's | 1981 Indoor | Wayne Miller | 400 meters | 6th | |
| Men's | 1981 Outdoor | Ron Freeman | 400 meters hurdles | 7th | |
| Women's | 1984 Outdoor | Joan Nesbit | 10,000 meters | 4th | |
| Men's | 1986 Indoor | Michael Patton | Triple jump | 6th | |
| Men's | 1986 Outdoor | George Nicholas | 5000 meters | 4th | |
| Men's | 1986 Outdoor | Kevin McGorty | Decathlon | 8th | |
| Men's | 1987 Indoor | Johan Boakes | 1000 meters | 7th | |
| Men's | 1987 Indoor | Dave Fuhrmann | 1000 meters | 8th | |
| Men's | 1987 Indoor | Michael Patton | Triple jump | 5th | |
| Men's | 1987 Outdoor | Jim Farmer | 5000 meters | 7th | |
| Men's | 1988 Indoor | Danny Peebles | 200 meters | 2nd | |
| Men's | 1988 Indoor | Michael Patton | Triple jump | 2nd | |
| Women's | 1988 Indoor | Mia Pollard | 800 meters | 4th | |
| Women's | 1988 Indoor | Kendra Mackey | 4 × 400 meters relay | 5th | |
| Women's | 1988 Indoor | Shelby Moorman | 4 × 400 meters relay | 5th | |
| Women's | 1988 Indoor | Jill Irizarry | 4 × 400 meters relay | 5th | |
| Women's | 1988 Indoor | Mia Pollard | 4 × 400 meters relay | 5th | |
| Men's | 1988 Outdoor | Jim Farmer | 5000 meters | 4th | |
| Men's | 1988 Outdoor | Kevin McGorty | Decathlon | 4th | |
| Women's | 1988 Outdoor | Sherrie MacKinney | Javelin throw | 5th | |
| Women's | 1989 Indoor | Sharon Couch | 55 meters hurdles | 4th | |
| Women's | 1989 Indoor | Sonya Thomas | 4 × 400 meters relay | 6th | |
| Women's | 1989 Indoor | Shelby Moorman | 4 × 400 meters relay | 6th | |
| Women's | 1989 Indoor | Rebecca Russell | 4 × 400 meters relay | 6th | |
| Women's | 1989 Indoor | Kendra Mackey | 4 × 400 meters relay | 6th | |
| Women's | 1989 Indoor | Michelle Faherty | 4 × 800 meters relay | 5th | |
| Women's | 1989 Indoor | Kari Krehnbrink | 4 × 800 meters relay | 5th | |
| Women's | 1989 Indoor | Monica Witterholt | 4 × 800 meters relay | 5th | |
| Women's | 1989 Indoor | Mia Pollard | 4 × 800 meters relay | 5th | |
| Women's | 1989 Indoor | Kim Austin | Long jump | 7th | |
| Women's | 1989 Indoor | Kim Austin | Triple jump | 2nd | |
| Women's | 1989 Outdoor | Sonya Thomas | 4 × 400 meters relay | 7th | |
| Women's | 1989 Outdoor | Rebecca Russell | 4 × 400 meters relay | 7th | |
| Women's | 1989 Outdoor | Mia Pollard | 4 × 400 meters relay | 7th | |
| Women's | 1989 Outdoor | Kendra Mackey | 4 × 400 meters relay | 7th | |
| Women's | 1989 Outdoor | Kim Austin | Triple jump | 3rd | |
| Women's | 1990 Indoor | Kim Austin | 55 meters hurdles | 6th | |
| Women's | 1990 Indoor | Kendra Mackey | 200 meters | 6th | |
| Women's | 1990 Indoor | Michelle Faherty | 4 × 800 meters relay | 5th | |
| Women's | 1990 Indoor | Rebecca Russell | 4 × 800 meters relay | 5th | |
| Women's | 1990 Indoor | Kari Krehnbrink | 4 × 800 meters relay | 5th | |
| Women's | 1990 Indoor | Mia Pollard | 4 × 800 meters relay | 5th | |
| Women's | 1990 Indoor | Kim Austin | Triple jump | 4th | |
| Men's | 1990 Outdoor | Sean Murray | Javelin throw | 8th | |
| Women's | 1990 Outdoor | Kendra Mackey | 200 meters | 5th | |
| Women's | 1990 Outdoor | Cammie Putman | 4 × 100 meters relay | 5th | |
| Women's | 1990 Outdoor | Sharon Couch | 4 × 100 meters relay | 5th | |
| Women's | 1990 Outdoor | Sonya Thomas | 4 × 100 meters relay | 5th | |
| Women's | 1990 Outdoor | Kendra Mackey | 4 × 100 meters relay | 5th | |
| Women's | 1990 Outdoor | Rebecca Russell | 4 × 400 meters relay | 3rd | |
| Women's | 1990 Outdoor | Mia Pollard | 4 × 400 meters relay | 3rd | |
| Women's | 1990 Outdoor | Cammie Putman | 4 × 400 meters relay | 3rd | |
| Women's | 1990 Outdoor | Kendra Mackey | 4 × 400 meters relay | 3rd | |
| Women's | 1990 Outdoor | Tisha Waller | High jump | 6th | |
| Women's | 1990 Outdoor | Kim Austin | Triple jump | 6th | |
| Men's | 1991 Indoor | Reginald Harris | 200 meters | 4th | |
| Women's | 1991 Indoor | Sharon Couch | 55 meters hurdles | 6th | |
| Women's | 1991 Indoor | Mel Benner | 4 × 800 meters relay | 2nd | |
| Women's | 1991 Indoor | Michelle Faherty | 4 × 800 meters relay | 2nd | |
| Women's | 1991 Indoor | Andrea LaMoreaux | 4 × 800 meters relay | 2nd | |
| Women's | 1991 Indoor | Rebecca Russell | 4 × 800 meters relay | 2nd | |
| Women's | 1991 Indoor | Tisha Waller | High jump | 2nd | |
| Women's | 1991 Indoor | Penny Blackwell | Long jump | 4th | |
| Women's | 1991 Outdoor | Rebecca Russell | 4 × 400 meters relay | 6th | |
| Women's | 1991 Outdoor | Sonya Thomas | 4 × 400 meters relay | 6th | |
| Women's | 1991 Outdoor | Angelia Wilkerson | 4 × 400 meters relay | 6th | |
| Women's | 1991 Outdoor | Kendra Mackey | 4 × 400 meters relay | 6th | |
| Women's | 1991 Outdoor | Tisha Waller | High jump | 2nd | |
| Women's | 1991 Outdoor | Sharon Couch | Long jump | 6th | |
| Women's | 1991 Outdoor | Penny Blackwell | Triple jump | 7th | |
| Women's | 1991 Outdoor | Nicole Hudson | Heptathlon | 7th | |
| Men's | 1992 Indoor | Allen Johnson | 55 meters hurdles | 1st | |
| Men's | 1992 Indoor | Reginald Harris | 200 meters | 4th | |
| Men's | 1992 Indoor | Reginald Harris | 400 meters | 2nd | |
| Women's | 1992 Indoor | Tisha Waller | High jump | 3rd | |
| Men's | 1992 Outdoor | Allen Johnson | 110 meters hurdles | 3rd | |
| Men's | 1992 Outdoor | Sean Murray | Javelin throw | 6th | |
| Men's | 1992 Outdoor | Paul Foxson | Decathlon | 6th | |
| Women's | 1992 Outdoor | Rebecca Russell | 400 meters hurdles | 7th | |
| Women's | 1992 Outdoor | Tisha Waller | High jump | 3rd | |
| Women's | 1992 Outdoor | Lynda Lipson | Discus throw | 8th | |
| Women's | 1992 Outdoor | Lynda Lipson | Javelin throw | 2nd | |
| Women's | 1992 Outdoor | Nicole Hudson | Heptathlon | 6th | |
| Men's | 1993 Indoor | Randy Jordan | 55 meters | 4th | |
| Men's | 1993 Indoor | Allen Johnson | 55 meters hurdles | 2nd | |
| Men's | 1993 Indoor | Chad Black | 55 meters hurdles | 5th | |
| Women's | 1993 Indoor | Ayo Atterberry | 55 meters hurdles | 5th | |
| Women's | 1993 Indoor | Andrea LaMoreaux | 4 × 800 meters relay | 4th | |
| Women's | 1993 Indoor | Monique Hunt | 4 × 800 meters relay | 4th | |
| Women's | 1993 Indoor | Leslie McCaskill | 4 × 800 meters relay | 4th | |
| Women's | 1993 Indoor | Trudy Stallings | 4 × 800 meters relay | 4th | |
| Men's | 1993 Outdoor | Allen Johnson | 110 meters hurdles | 2nd | |
| Women's | 1993 Outdoor | Lynda Lipson | Javelin throw | 6th | |
| Women's | 1994 Indoor | Ayo Atterberry | 55 meters hurdles | 7th | |
| Women's | 1994 Indoor | Susana Matsen | 3000 meters | 8th | |
| Men's | 1994 Outdoor | Tony McCall | 100 meters | 6th | |
| Men's | 1994 Outdoor | Tony McCall | 200 meters | 7th | |
| Men's | 1994 Outdoor | Kevin Brown | Pole vault | 4th | |
| Women's | 1994 Outdoor | Ayo Atterberry | 100 meters hurdles | 5th | |
| Women's | 1994 Outdoor | Marion Jones | 200 meters | 6th | |
| Women's | 1994 Outdoor | Ayo Atterberry | 4 × 100 meters relay | 5th | |
| Women's | 1994 Outdoor | Marion Jones | 4 × 100 meters relay | 5th | |
| Women's | 1994 Outdoor | Tiffany Weatherford | 4 × 100 meters relay | 5th | |
| Women's | 1994 Outdoor | Keisha Quick | 4 × 100 meters relay | 5th | |
| Women's | 1994 Outdoor | Marion Jones | Long jump | 2nd | |
| Women's | 1994 Outdoor | Ingrid Hantho | Discus throw | 4th | |
| Men's | 1995 Indoor | Tony McCall | 55 meters | 5th | |
| Men's | 1995 Indoor | Milton Campbell | 400 meters | 8th | |
| Men's | 1995 Indoor | Tony McCall | 4 × 400 meters relay | 1st | |
| Men's | 1995 Indoor | Milton Campbell | 4 × 400 meters relay | 1st | |
| Men's | 1995 Indoor | Henry McRoy | 4 × 400 meters relay | 1st | |
| Men's | 1995 Indoor | Ken Harnden | 4 × 400 meters relay | 1st | |
| Men's | 1995 Indoor | Shannon Pope | Pole vault | 5th | |
| Women's | 1995 Indoor | LaTasha Colander | 55 meters hurdles | 2nd | |
| Women's | 1995 Indoor | Monique Hennagan (Note: Track and Field News listed Monique Hunt as the leadoff leg) | Distance medley relay | 5th | |
| Women's | 1995 Indoor | LaTasha Colander | Distance medley relay | 5th | |
| Women's | 1995 Indoor | Kelly Donahoe | Distance medley relay | 5th | |
| Women's | 1995 Indoor | Karen Godlock | Distance medley relay | 5th | |
| Women's | 1995 Indoor | Kim Jones | High jump | 7th | |
| Women's | 1995 Indoor | Tyra Moore | Triple jump | 4th | |
| Men's | 1995 Outdoor | Tony McCall | 100 meters | 6th | |
| Men's | 1995 Outdoor | Tony McCall | 200 meters | 4th | |
| Men's | 1995 Outdoor | Ken Harnden | 400 meters hurdles | 1st | |
| Men's | 1995 Outdoor | Chad Black | 4 × 100 meters relay | 6th | |
| Men's | 1995 Outdoor | Tony McCall | 4 × 100 meters relay | 6th | |
| Men's | 1995 Outdoor | Milton Campbell | 4 × 100 meters relay | 6th | |
| Men's | 1995 Outdoor | Curtis Johnson | 4 × 100 meters relay | 6th | |
| Men's | 1995 Outdoor | Milton Campbell | 4 × 400 meters relay | 7th | |
| Men's | 1995 Outdoor | John McCaskill | 4 × 400 meters relay | 7th | |
| Men's | 1995 Outdoor | Henry McKoy | 4 × 400 meters relay | 7th | |
| Men's | 1995 Outdoor | Ken Harnden | 4 × 400 meters relay | 7th | |
| Men's | 1995 Outdoor | Jeff Klutz | High jump | 8th | |
| Men's | 1995 Outdoor | Shannon Pope | Pole vault | 8th | |
| Men's | 1995 Outdoor | Kendrick Morgan | Triple jump | 7th | |
| Women's | 1995 Outdoor | LaTasha Colander | 100 meters hurdles | 6th | |
| Women's | 1995 Outdoor | Monique Hunt | 800 meters | 6th | |
| Women's | 1995 Outdoor | LaTasha Colander | 4 × 100 meters relay | 5th | |
| Women's | 1995 Outdoor | Marion Jones | 4 × 100 meters relay | 5th | |
| Women's | 1995 Outdoor | Tiffany Weatherford | 4 × 100 meters relay | 5th | |
| Women's | 1995 Outdoor | Takeshia Quick | 4 × 100 meters relay | 5th | |
| Women's | 1995 Outdoor | Kim Jones | High jump | 7th | |
| Women's | 1995 Outdoor | Marion Jones | Long jump | 4th | |
| Women's | 1995 Outdoor | Price Russell | Javelin throw | 8th | |
| Men's | 1996 Indoor | Curtis Johnson | 55 meters | 5th | |
| Men's | 1996 Indoor | Tony McCall | 55 meters | 6th | |
| Men's | 1996 Indoor | Marcus Stokes | 55 meters hurdles | 6th | |
| Men's | 1996 Indoor | Milton Campbell | 400 meters | 7th | |
| Women's | 1996 Indoor | LaTasha Colander | 55 meters hurdles | 4th | |
| Women's | 1996 Indoor | Monique Hennagan | 400 meters | 1st | |
| Women's | 1996 Indoor | Leigh Dickson | 4 × 400 meters relay | 7th | |
| Women's | 1996 Indoor | LaTasha Colander | 4 × 400 meters relay | 7th | |
| Women's | 1996 Indoor | Monique Hunt | 4 × 400 meters relay | 7th | |
| Women's | 1996 Indoor | Monique Hennagan | 4 × 400 meters relay | 7th | |
| Women's | 1996 Indoor | Kim Jones | High jump | 8th | |
| Women's | 1996 Indoor | Nicole Gamble | Triple jump | 8th | |
| Men's | 1996 Outdoor | Tony McCall | 100 meters | 5th | |
| Men's | 1996 Outdoor | Marcus Stokes | 4 × 100 meters relay | 1st | |
| Men's | 1996 Outdoor | Tony McCall | 4 × 100 meters relay | 1st | |
| Men's | 1996 Outdoor | Milton Campbell | 4 × 100 meters relay | 1st | |
| Men's | 1996 Outdoor | Curtis Johnson | 4 × 100 meters relay | 1st | |
| Men's | 1996 Outdoor | Eric Bishop | High jump | 1st | |
| Men's | 1996 Outdoor | Shannon Pope | Pole vault | 8th | |
| Men's | 1996 Outdoor | Kendrick Morgan | Triple jump | 4th | |
| Women's | 1996 Outdoor | LaTasha Colander | 100 meters hurdles | 8th | |
| Women's | 1996 Outdoor | Monique Hennagan | 400 meters | 4th | |
| Women's | 1996 Outdoor | Monique Hennagan | 800 meters | 1st | |
| Women's | 1996 Outdoor | Monique Hunt | 800 meters | 7th | |
| Women's | 1996 Outdoor | LaTasha Colander | 4 × 100 meters relay | 7th | |
| Women's | 1996 Outdoor | Takeshia Quick | 4 × 100 meters relay | 7th | |
| Women's | 1996 Outdoor | Teri Vann | 4 × 100 meters relay | 7th | |
| Women's | 1996 Outdoor | Nadine Faustin | 4 × 100 meters relay | 7th | |
| Women's | 1996 Outdoor | LaShonda Christopher | Long jump | 3rd | |
| Women's | 1996 Outdoor | Nicole Gamble | Long jump | 8th | |
| Women's | 1996 Outdoor | LaShonda Christopher | Triple jump | 5th | |
| Women's | 1996 Outdoor | Nicole Gamble | Triple jump | 6th | |
| Women's | 1996 Outdoor | Tyra Moore | Triple jump | 8th | |
| Men's | 1997 Indoor | Milton Campbell | 400 meters | 4th | |
| Men's | 1997 Indoor | Eric Bishop | High jump | 1st | |
| Women's | 1997 Indoor | LaTasha Colander | 55 meters hurdles | 6th | |
| Women's | 1997 Indoor | Monique Hennagan | 400 meters | 6th | |
| Women's | 1997 Indoor | Blake Phillips | Distance medley relay | 7th | |
| Women's | 1997 Indoor | LaTasha Colander | Distance medley relay | 7th | |
| Women's | 1997 Indoor | Erin Hayes | Distance medley relay | 7th | |
| Women's | 1997 Indoor | Karen Godlock | Distance medley relay | 7th | |
| Women's | 1997 Indoor | Nicole Gamble | Triple jump | 4th | |
| Men's | 1997 Outdoor | Tony McCall | 100 meters | 3rd | |
| Men's | 1997 Outdoor | Tony McCall | 200 meters | 5th | |
| Men's | 1997 Outdoor | Milton Campbell | 400 meters | 4th | |
| Men's | 1997 Outdoor | Slade Trabucco | 4 × 400 meters relay | 8th | |
| Men's | 1997 Outdoor | Milton Campbell | 4 × 400 meters relay | 8th | |
| Men's | 1997 Outdoor | Jackson Miranda | 4 × 400 meters relay | 8th | |
| Men's | 1997 Outdoor | Dominic Demeritt | 4 × 400 meters relay | 8th | |
| Men's | 1997 Outdoor | Eric Bishop | High jump | 8th | |
| Women's | 1997 Outdoor | Monique Hennagan | 400 meters | 5th | |
| Women's | 1997 Outdoor | Nicole Gamble | Triple jump | 6th | |
| Women's | 1997 Outdoor | Emily Carlsten | Javelin throw | 5th | |
| Men's | 1998 Indoor | Milton Campbell | 200 meters | 2nd | |
| Men's | 1998 Indoor | Milton Campbell | 400 meters | 4th | |
| Men's | 1998 Indoor | Eric Bishop | High jump | 7th | |
| Women's | 1998 Indoor | LaTasha Colander | 55 meters hurdles | 8th | |
| Women's | 1998 Indoor | LaShonda Christopher | Long jump | 7th | |
| Women's | 1998 Indoor | Nicole Gamble | Triple jump | 2nd | |
| Men's | 1998 Outdoor | Miton Campbell | 400 meters | 3rd | |
| Women's | 1998 Outdoor | Monique Hennagan | 400 meters | 7th | |
| Women's | 1998 Outdoor | Nadine Faustin | 4 × 100 meters relay | 8th | |
| Women's | 1998 Outdoor | Crystal Cox | 4 × 100 meters relay | 8th | |
| Women's | 1998 Outdoor | Teri Vann | 4 × 100 meters relay | 8th | |
| Women's | 1998 Outdoor | LaTasha Colander | 4 × 100 meters relay | 8th | |
| Women's | 1998 Outdoor | Nicole Gamble | Triple jump | 3rd | |
| Women's | 1998 Outdoor | LaShonda Christopher | Triple jump | 5th | |
| Women's | 1999 Indoor | Nicole Gamble | Long jump | 2nd | |
| Women's | 1999 Indoor | Nicole Gamble | Triple jump | 1st | |
| Women's | 1999 Indoor | DeAnne Davis | Triple jump | 6th | |
| Men's | 1999 Outdoor | Mike Ballard | 4 × 100 meters relay | 4th | |
| Men's | 1999 Outdoor | Addis Huyler | 4 × 100 meters relay | 4th | |
| Men's | 1999 Outdoor | Marcus O’Neal | 4 × 100 meters relay | 4th | |
| Men's | 1999 Outdoor | Dominic Demeritte | 4 × 100 meters relay | 4th | |
| Women's | 1999 Outdoor | Joy Ganes | High jump | 6th | |
| Women's | 1999 Outdoor | Nicole Gamble | Triple jump | 4th | |
| Women's | 1999 Outdoor | LaShonda Christopher | Triple jump | 8th | |
| Women's | 2000 Indoor | Joy Ganes | High jump | 7th | |
| Women's | 2000 Indoor | DeAnne Davis | Triple jump | 4th | |
| Men's | 2000 Outdoor | Kestutis Celiesius | Javelin throw | 3rd | |
| Women's | 2000 Outdoor | Joy Ganes | High jump | 5th | |
| Women's | 2000 Outdoor | DeAnne Davis | Triple jump | 7th | |
| Women's | 2001 Indoor | Alice Schmidt | 800 meters | 2nd | |
| Women's | 2001 Indoor | Shalane Flanagan | Mile run | 7th | |
| Women's | 2001 Indoor | Beth George | Distance medley relay | 2nd | |
| Women's | 2001 Indoor | Edi Ntuen | Distance medley relay | 2nd | |
| Women's | 2001 Indoor | Alice Schmidt | Distance medley relay | 2nd | |
| Women's | 2001 Indoor | Shalane Flanagan | Distance medley relay | 2nd | |
| Women's | 2001 Indoor | Joy Ganes | High jump | 8th | |
| Women's | 2001 Indoor | Ola Sesay | Long jump | 8th | |
| Men's | 2001 Outdoor | Michael Cvelbar | Decathlon | 6th | |
| Women's | 2001 Outdoor | Joy Ganes | High jump | 7th | |
| Men's | 2002 Indoor | Adam Shunk | High jump | 2nd | |
| Men's | 2002 Indoor | Sal Gigante | Weight throw | 4th | |
| Women's | 2002 Indoor | Alice Schmidt | 800 meters | 3rd | |
| Women's | 2002 Indoor | Shalane Flanagan | Mile run | 3rd | |
| Women's | 2002 Indoor | Shalane Flanagan | 3000 meters | 6th | |
| Women's | 2002 Indoor | Carol Henry | 3000 meters | 7th | |
| Women's | 2002 Indoor | Erin Donohue | Distance medley relay | 2nd | |
| Women's | 2002 Indoor | Anissa Gainey | Distance medley relay | 2nd | |
| Women's | 2002 Indoor | Alice Schmidt | Distance medley relay | 2nd | |
| Women's | 2002 Indoor | Shalane Flanagan | Distance medley relay | 2nd | |
| Men's | 2002 Outdoor | Adam Shunk | High jump | 5th | |
| Women's | 2002 Outdoor | Alice Schmidt | 800 meters | 1st | |
| Women's | 2002 Outdoor | Shalane Flanagan | 1500 meters | 3rd | |
| Women's | 2002 Outdoor | Carol Henry | 3000 meters steeplechase | 3rd | |
| Men's | 2003 Indoor | Adam Shunk (Note: Jerrick Holmes of the Cal State Northridge Matadors track and field team originally won in 2.23 m, but he was later declared ineligible and Shunk was promoted to winner.) | High jump | 1st | |
| Women's | 2003 Indoor | Alice Schmidt | 800 meters | 4th | |
| Women's | 2003 Indoor | Shalane Flanagan | 3000 meters | 1st | |
| Women's | 2003 Indoor | Tiffany Flomo | 4 × 400 meters relay | 8th | |
| Women's | 2003 Indoor | Kameese Wright | 4 × 400 meters relay | 8th | |
| Women's | 2003 Indoor | Jennifer Nelms | 4 × 400 meters relay | 8th | |
| Women's | 2003 Indoor | Anissa Gainey | 4 × 400 meters relay | 8th | |
| Women's | 2003 Indoor | Erin Donohue | Distance medley relay | 1st | |
| Women's | 2003 Indoor | Anissa Gainey | Distance medley relay | 1st | |
| Women's | 2003 Indoor | Alice Schmidt | Distance medley relay | 1st | |
| Women's | 2003 Indoor | Shalane Flanagan | Distance medley relay | 1st | |
| Women's | 2003 Indoor | Laura Gerraughty | Shot put | 1st | |
| Women's | 2003 Indoor | Laura Gerraughty | Weight throw | 7th | |
| Men's | 2003 Outdoor | Adam Shunk | High jump | 6th | |
| Men's | 2003 Outdoor | Vikas Gowda | Discus throw | 5th | |
| Women's | 2003 Outdoor | Alice Schmidt | 800 meters | 1st | |
| Women's | 2003 Outdoor | Carol Henry | 3000 meters steeplechase | 7th | |
| Women's | 2003 Outdoor | Shalane Flanagan | 5000 meters | 2nd | |
| Women's | 2003 Outdoor | Laura Gerraughty | Shot put | 2nd | |
| Women's | 2003 Outdoor | Laura Gerraughty | Hammer throw | 7th | |
| Women's | 2004 Indoor | Alice Schmidt | 800 meters | 5th | |
| Women's | 2004 Indoor | Laura Gerraughty | Shot put | 1st | |
| Women's | 2004 Outdoor | Alice Schmidt | 800 meters | 3rd | |
| Women's | 2004 Outdoor | Laura Gerraughty | Shot put | 1st | |
| Men's | 2005 Indoor | Vikas Gowda | Shot put | 6th | |
| Men's | 2005 Indoor | Nick Owens | Weight throw | 8th | |
| Women's | 2005 Indoor | Erin Donohue | Mile run | 4th | |
| Women's | 2005 Indoor | Erin Donohue | Distance medley relay | 4th | |
| Women's | 2005 Indoor | Danielle Rodgers | Distance medley relay | 4th | |
| Women's | 2005 Indoor | Georgia Kloss | Distance medley relay | 4th | |
| Women's | 2005 Indoor | Cassie King | Distance medley relay | 4th | |
| Women's | 2005 Indoor | Sheena Gordon | High jump | 4th | |
| Women's | 2005 Indoor | Laura Gerraughty | Weight throw | 7th | |
| Men's | 2005 Outdoor | Vikas Gowda | Discus throw | 2nd | |
| Men's | 2005 Outdoor | Nick Owens | Hammer throw | 3rd | |
| Women's | 2005 Outdoor | Erin Donohue | 1500 meters | 4th | |
| Women's | 2005 Outdoor | Cassie King | 3000 meters steeplechase | 8th | |
| Women's | 2005 Outdoor | Sheena Gordon | High jump | 7th | |
| Women's | 2005 Outdoor | Jocelyn White | Discus throw | 5th | |
| Men's | 2006 Indoor | Vikas Gowda | Shot put | 5th | |
| Women's | 2006 Indoor | Georgia Kloss | 800 meters | 8th | |
| Women's | 2006 Indoor | Megan Kaltenbach | Distance medley relay | 1st | |
| Women's | 2006 Indoor | Danielle Rodgers | Distance medley relay | 1st | |
| Women's | 2006 Indoor | Georgia Kloss | Distance medley relay | 1st | |
| Women's | 2006 Indoor | Brie Felnagle | Distance medley relay | 1st | |
| Women's | 2006 Indoor | Sheena Gordon | High jump | 1st | |
| Women's | 2006 Indoor | Laura Gerraughty | Shot put | 2nd | |
| Men's | 2006 Outdoor | Vikas Gowda | Discus throw | 1st | |
| Men's | 2006 Outdoor | Nick Owens | Hammer throw | 3rd | |
| Men's | 2006 Outdoor | Justin Ryncavage | Javelin throw | 1st | |
| Women's | 2006 Outdoor | Sheena Gordon | High jump | 2nd | |
| Women's | 2006 Outdoor | Laura Gerraughty | Shot put | 1st | |
| Men's | 2007 Indoor | Nick Owens | Weight throw | 3rd | |
| Women's | 2007 Indoor | Brie Felnagle | 3000 meters | 5th | |
| Women's | 2007 Indoor | Megan Kaltenbach | Distance medley relay | 1st | |
| Women's | 2007 Indoor | Tyra Johnson | Distance medley relay | 1st | |
| Women's | 2007 Indoor | Georgia Kloss | Distance medley relay | 1st | |
| Women's | 2007 Indoor | Brie Felnagle | Distance medley relay | 1st | |
| Men's | 2007 Outdoor | Nick Owens | Hammer throw | 2nd | |
| Men's | 2007 Outdoor | Justin Ryncavage | Javelin throw | 1st | |
| Men's | 2007 Outdoor | Adam Montague | Javelin throw | 2nd | |
| Women's | 2007 Outdoor | Brie Felnagle | 1500 meters | 1st | |
| Women's | 2008 Indoor | Brie Felnagle | 3000 meters | 2nd | |
| Women's | 2008 Indoor | Patience Coleman | High jump | 7th | |
| Men's | 2008 Outdoor | Donte' Nall | High jump | 5th | |
| Men's | 2008 Outdoor | Austin Davis | Triple jump | 8th | |
| Women's | 2008 Outdoor | LaToya James | 400 meters hurdles | 4th | |
| Men's | 2009 Indoor | Austin Davis | Triple jump | 7th | |
| Men's | 2009 Indoor | Daniel Keller | Heptathlon | 7th | |
| Women's | 2009 Indoor | Vanneisha Ivy | 60 meters hurdles | 8th | |
| Women's | 2009 Indoor | Brie Felnagle | Mile run | 5th | |
| Women's | 2009 Indoor | Christie Johnson | 4 × 400 meters relay | 8th | |
| Women's | 2009 Indoor | Elizabeth Mott | 4 × 400 meters relay | 8th | |
| Women's | 2009 Indoor | Callie Pottinger | 4 × 400 meters relay | 8th | |
| Women's | 2009 Indoor | Tasha Stanley | 4 × 400 meters relay | 8th | |
| Women's | 2009 Indoor | Ashley Verplank | Distance medley relay | 2nd | |
| Women's | 2009 Indoor | Elizabeth Mott | Distance medley relay | 2nd | |
| Women's | 2009 Indoor | Callie Pottinger | Distance medley relay | 2nd | |
| Women's | 2009 Indoor | Brie Felnagle | Distance medley relay | 2nd | |
| Men's | 2009 Outdoor | Mateo Sossah | Decathlon | 2nd | |
| Men's | 2009 Outdoor | Daniel Keller | Decathlon | 8th | |
| Women's | 2009 Outdoor | Vanneisha Ivy | 100 meters hurdles | 6th | |
| Women's | 2009 Outdoor | Dominique Jackson | 800 meters | 7th | |
| Men's | 2010 Indoor | Clayton Parros | 400 meters | 7th | |
| Men's | 2010 Indoor | Mateo Sossah | Heptathlon | 2nd | |
| Women's | 2010 Indoor | Vanneish Ivy | 60 meters hurdles | 8th | |
| Men's | 2010 Outdoor | Mateo Sossah | Decathlon | 8th | |
| Women's | 2010 Outdoor | Vanneisha Ivy | 100 meters hurdles | 8th | |
| Men's | 2011 Indoor | Charles Cox | 400 meters | 6th | |
| Men's | 2011 Outdoor | Parker Smith | Pole vault | 4th | |
| Men's | 2011 Outdoor | Mateo Sossah | Decathlon | 7th | |
| Women's | 2011 Outdoor | Elizabeth Mott | 4 × 400 meters relay | 6th | |
| Women's | 2011 Outdoor | LaToya James | 4 × 400 meters relay | 6th | |
| Women's | 2011 Outdoor | Tasha Stanley | 4 × 400 meters relay | 6th | |
| Women's | 2011 Outdoor | Zoey Russel | 4 × 400 meters relay | 6th | |
| Men's | 2012 Indoor | Parker Smith | Pole vault | 8th | |
| Women's | 2013 Indoor | Chrishawn Williams | Long jump | 8th | |
| Men's | 2014 Indoor | Sean Sutton | 4 × 400 meters relay | 5th | |
| Men's | 2014 Indoor | Javonte Lipsey | 4 × 400 meters relay | 5th | |
| Men's | 2014 Indoor | Ceo Ways | 4 × 400 meters relay | 5th | |
| Men's | 2014 Indoor | O'Neal Wanliss | 4 × 400 meters relay | 5th | |
| Men's | 2014 Outdoor | Rilwan Alowanle | 400 meters hurdles | 5th | |
| Women's | 2014 Outdoor | Xenia Rahn | Heptathlon | 8th | |
| Men's | 2015 Indoor | Sean Sutton | 4 × 400 meters relay | 6th | |
| Men's | 2015 Indoor | Kenneth Selmon | 4 × 400 meters relay | 6th | |
| Men's | 2015 Indoor | Ceo Ways | 4 × 400 meters relay | 6th | |
| Men's | 2015 Indoor | Javonte Lipsey | 4 × 400 meters relay | 6th | |
| Women's | 2015 Indoor | Elizabeth Whelan | 800 meters | 6th | |
| Women's | 2015 Indoor | Xenia Rahn | Pentathlon | 3rd | |
| Men's | 2015 Outdoor | Ceo Ways | 400 meters | 7th | |
| Women's | 2015 Outdoor | Xenia Rahn | Heptathlon | 7th | |
| Men's | 2016 Indoor | AJ Hicks | Weight throw | 6th | |
| Men's | 2016 Outdoor | Kenny Selmon | 400 meters hurdles | 3rd | |
| Women's | 2017 Indoor | Nicole Greene | High jump | 5th | |
| Men's | 2017 Outdoor | Kenny Selmon | 400 meters hurdles | 4th | |
| Women's | 2018 Indoor | Nicole Greene | High jump | 1st | |
| Men's | 2018 Outdoor | Kenny Selmon | 400 meters hurdles | 2nd | |
| Men's | 2019 Indoor | Daniel McArthur | Shot put | 4th | |
| Women's | 2019 Outdoor | Nicole Greene | High jump | 2nd | |
| Women's | 2019 Outdoor | Madison Wiltrout | Javelin throw | 3rd | |
| Men's | 2021 Indoor | Thomas Ratcliffe | Distance medley relay | 4th | |
| Men's | 2021 Indoor | Isaiah Palmer | Distance medley relay | 4th | |
| Men's | 2021 Indoor | Allen Siegler | Distance medley relay | 4th | |
| Men's | 2021 Indoor | Brandon Tubby | Distance medley relay | 4th | |
| Men's | 2021 Indoor | Daniel McArthur | Shot put | 4th | |
| Men's | 2021 Outdoor | Thomas Ratcliffe | 5000 meters | 7th | |
| Women's | 2021 Outdoor | Jillian Shippee | Hammer throw | 3rd | |
| Women's | 2022 Indoor | Anna Keefer | Long jump | 8th | |
| Men's | 2022 Outdoor | Alex Ostberg | 5000 meters | 8th | |
| Women's | 2022 Outdoor | Madison Wiltrout | Javelin throw | 3rd | |
| Men's | 2023 Indoor | Parker Wolfe | 5000 meters | 5th | |
| Men's | 2023 Indoor | Jesse Hunt | Distance medley relay | 6th | |
| Men's | 2023 Indoor | Jared Williams | Distance medley relay | 6th | |
| Men's | 2023 Indoor | Kyle Reinheimer | Distance medley relay | 6th | |
| Men's | 2023 Indoor | Ethan Strand | Distance medley relay | 6th | |
| Men's | 2023 Outdoor | Jesse Hunt | 1500 meters | 6th | |
| Men's | 2023 Outdoor | Parker Wolfe | 5000 meters | 5th | |
| Women's | 2023 Outdoor | Madison Wiltrout | Javelin throw | 8th | |
| Men's | 2024 Indoor | Ethan Strand | Mile run | 4th | |
| Men's | 2024 Indoor | Parker Wolfe | 3000 meters | 2nd | |
| Men's | 2024 Indoor | Parker Wolfe | 5000 meters | 2nd | |
| Men's | 2024 Indoor | Aiden Neal | Distance medley relay | 4th | |
| Men's | 2024 Indoor | Andrew Regnier | Distance medley relay | 4th | |
| Men's | 2024 Indoor | Kyle Reinheimer | Distance medley relay | 4th | |
| Men's | 2024 Indoor | Jake Gebhardt | Distance medley relay | 4th | |
| Men's | 2024 Outdoor | Parker Wolfe | 5000 meters | 1st | |

== See also ==
- Category:North Carolina Tar Heels men's track and field athletes (25)
- Category:North Carolina Tar Heels women's track and field athletes (24)
