= 2008 NCAA Division I Indoor Track and Field Championships =

- Dates: March 14–15, 2008
- Host city: Fayetteville, Arkansas; University of Arkansas
- Venue: Randal Tyson Track Center
- Events: 32

The 2008 NCAA Division I Indoor Track and Field Championships was the 43rd NCAA Men's Division I Indoor Track and Field Championships and the 26th NCAA Women's Division I Indoor Track and Field Championships, held at the Randal Tyson Track Center in Fayetteville, Arkansas near the campus of the host school, the University of Arkansas. In total, thirty-two different men's and women's indoor track and field events were contested from March 14 to March 15, 2008.

== Team scores ==
- Note: Top 10 only
- Scoring: 10 points for a 1st-place finish in an event, 8 points for 2nd, 6 points for 3rd, 5 points for 4th, 4 points for 5th, 3 points for 6th, 2points for 7th, and 1 point for 8th.
- Full results

=== Men's teams ===
Rank	University	Points
1	Arizona State	44
2	Florida State	41
3	Texas	34
4	LSU	33
5	Tennessee	26
6	Arkansas	24
7	Stanford	23
8	Florida	19
9	Northern Iowa	18
10	Washington	17
10	Texas A&M	17

=== Women's teams ===
Rank	University	Points
1	Arizona State	51
2	LSU	43
3	Michigan	39
4	Texas	35
5	Stanford	32
6	Florida State	28
7	Texas A&M	23
8	Tennessee	19
8	Florida	19
10	Virginia Tech	18
10	Texas Tech	18
10	Kansas	18

== Results ==
=== Men's results ===
==== 60 meters ====
Rank	Name	University	Time	Notes
1st place, gold medalist(s)	Richard Thompson Trinidad and Tobago	LSU	6.51	
2nd place, silver medalist(s)	Trindon Holliday	LSU	6.54	
3rd place, bronze medalist(s)	Travis Padgett	Clemson	6.60	
4	Adam Harris	Michigan	6.62	
5	J-Mee Samuels	Arkansas	6.64	(6.632)
6	Gerald Phiri Zambia	Texas A&M	6.64	(6.636)
7	Rubin Williams	Tennessee	6.72	
8	Michael Ray Garvin	Florida State	6.74	

==== 200 meters ====
Rank	Name	University	Time	Heat
1st place, gold medalist(s)	Rubin Williams	Tennessee	20.36	2
2nd place, silver medalist(s)	Charles Clark	Florida State	20.50	2
3rd place, bronze medalist(s)	J-Mee Samuels	Arkansas	20.67	1
4	Willie Perry	Florida	20.73	1
5	Chris Dykes	Texas A&M	20.77	2
6	Evander Wells	Tennessee	20.78	2
7	Michael Ray Garvin	Florida State	20.79	1
8	Trey Harts	Baylor	20.87	1

==== 400 meters ====
Rank	Name	University	Time	Heat
1st place, gold medalist(s)	Andretti Bain Bahamas	Oral Roberts	46.19	2
2nd place, silver medalist(s)	Joel Phillip Grenada	Arizona State	46.27	1
3rd place, bronze medalist(s)	Jordan Boase	Washington	46.34	2
4	Bobby McCoy	Arizona	46.36	1
5	Calvin Smith	Florida	46.44	2
6	Miles Smith	SE Missouri	46.46	2
7	Lukas Hulett	Nebraska	47.22	1
8	Jimmie Gordon	Arizona State	47.47	1

==== 800 meters ====
Rank	Name	University	Time	Notes
1st place, gold medalist(s)	Tyler Mulder	Northern Iowa	1:49.20	
2nd place, silver medalist(s)	Elkana Kosgei	LSU	1:49.47	
3rd place, bronze medalist(s)	Ross Ridgewell	Georgia	1:49.52	
4	Tim Harris	Miami	1:49.63	
5	Reuben Twijukye	LSU	1:49.66	
6	Shaun Smith	Oral Roberts	1:50.33	
7	Keith Jensen	BYU	1:50.43	
8	Abraham Mach	C. Michigan	1:57.73	

==== Mile ====
Rank	Name	University	Time	Notes
1st place, gold medalist(s)	Leonel Manzano	Texas	4:04.45	
2nd place, silver medalist(s)	Jake Morse	Texas	4:04.88	
3rd place, bronze medalist(s)	Andrew Acosta	Oregon	4:04.90	
4	Garrett Heath	Stanford	4:05.04	
5	Sam Bair III	Pittsburgh	4:05.50	
6	Jake Watson	Notre Dame	4:05.51	
7	Jeff See	Ohio State	4:05.75	
8	Micky Cobrin	Arkansas	4:05.99	
9	Andy McClary	Arkansas	4:06.46	
10	Michael Maag	Princeton	4:06.61	

==== 3000 meters ====
Rank	Name	University	Time	Notes
1st place, gold medalist(s)	Kyle Alcorn	Arizona State	8:00.82	
2nd place, silver medalist(s)	Andrew Bumbalough	Georgetown	8:02.22	
3rd place, bronze medalist(s)	Kyle Perry	BYU	8:02.63	
4	Bobby Curtis	Villanova	8:02.79	
5	Kurt Benninger	Notre Dame	8:03.61	
6	Josh McDougal	Liberty	8:03.77	
7	Sean Quigley	La Salle	8:05.20	
8	David McNeill	N. Arizona	8:06.18	
9	Brandon Bethke	Wisconsin	8:06.63	
10	Matt Debole	Georgetown	8:07.35	

==== 5000 meters ====
Rank	Name	University	Time	Notes
1st place, gold medalist(s)	Shadrack Songok	A&M-CC	13:51.26	
2nd place, silver medalist(s)	Jacob Korir	E. Kentucky	13:52.91	
3rd place, bronze medalist(s)	Sean Quigley	La Salle	13:54.05	
4	Mark Korir Kenya	Wyoming	13:57.87	
5	Josh McDougal	Liberty	13:58.62	
6	Michael Kilburg	Portland	14:02.24	
7	Ian Burrell	Georgia	14:06.17	
8	Tyler Hill	Arkansas	14:06.22	
9	Tyson David	Alabama	14:13.53	
10	Matthew Tebo	Colorado	14:14.88	

==== 60 meters hurdles ====
Rank	Name	University	Time	Notes
1st place, gold medalist(s)	Drew Brunson	Florida State	7.53	(7.527)
2nd place, silver medalist(s)	Jason Richardson	S. Carolina	7.53	(7.530)
3rd place, bronze medalist(s)	Ronald Forbes Cayman Islands	Florida International	7.58	
4	Shawon Harris	Texas Tech	7.68	
5	Jangy Addy Liberia	Tennessee	7.84	
6	Sheldon Leith	Oklahoma	7.97	

==== 4x400 meters relay ====
Rank	Team	Members	Time	Notes
1st place, gold medalist(s)	Baylor	Trey Harts, Marcus Boyd, Justin Boyd, LeJerald Betters	3:05.66	
2nd place, silver medalist(s)	Texas Christian	Che Chavez, Dell Guy, Clemore Henry, Matt Love	3:06.19	
3rd place, bronze medalist(s)	Arizona State	Jimmie Gordon, Darryl Elston, Justin Kremer, Joel Phillip Grenada	3:06.34	
4	Texas A&M	Justin Oliver, Chris Dykes, Nick Robinson, A.C. Robinson	3:06.37	
5	Florida	R.J. Anderson, LaMarr Davis, Bernard Middleton, Calvin Smith	3:07.34	
6	Florida State	Tywayne Buchanon, Pablo Navarette, Brandon Byrum, Charles Clark	3:07.47	
7	Oregon	Ashton Eaton, Chad Barlow, Phil Alexander, Marcus Dillon	3:07.89	
8	Western Kentucky	Gavin Smellie Canada, Romaine McKay, Alexander Larin, Terrill McCombs	3:08.16	
9	Texas Tech	Bill Lawhorn, Gil Roberts, Shawon Harris, Lamont Adams	3:08.43	
10	Kentucky	Nathan Browning, Kwasi Obeng, Stephan Smith, Jose Acevedo Venezuela	3:08.60	

==== Distance medley relay ====
Rank	Team	Members	Time	Notes
1st place, gold medalist(s)	Texas	Jacob Hernandez, Danzell Fortson, Tevan Everett, Leonel Manzano	9:32.04	
2nd place, silver medalist(s)	Arizona State	Joey Heller, Justin Kremer, Nectaly Barbosa, Kyle Alcor	9:32.49	
3rd place, bronze medalist(s)	Wisconsin	Craig Miller, James Groce, Evan Jager, Jack Bolas	9:33.83	
4	Stanford	Hakon DeVries, Andrew Dargie, Jacob Evans, Garrett Heath	9:34.03	
5	Georgetown	Matt Debole, Danny Harris, Mike Banks, Andrew Bumbalough	9:34.22	
6	LSU	Michael Hendry, Armanti Hayes, Jamal James, John Kosgei Kenya	9:35.72	
7	UCLA	Marlon Patterson, Elijah Wells, Cory Primm, Laef Barnes	9:35.74	
8	Villanova	Michael Kerrigan, Elvis Lewis, Mark Korich, Robert Curtis	9:36.42	
9	Oregon	Michael McGrath, Chad Barlow, Andrew Wheating, Matthew Centrowitz	9:36.80	
10	Notre Dame	Blake Choplin, Austin Wechter, Adam Currie, Dan Clark	9:45.41	

==== High jump ====
Rank	Name	University	Height	Notes
1st place, gold medalist(s)	Dusty Jonas	Nebraska	2.31 m (7 ft 6 3/4 in)	
2nd place, silver medalist(s)	Scott Sellers	Kansas State	2.25 m (7 ft 4 1/2 in)	
3rd place, bronze medalist(s)	Ehi Oamen	Northern Iowa	2.19 m (7 ft 2 in)	
4	Ivan Diggs	Houston	2.19 m (7 ft 2 in)	
5	Will Littleton	Texas-Pan Am	2.19 m (7 ft 2 in)	
6	Norris Frederick	Washington	2.19 m (7 ft 2 in)	
7	Ed Wright	California	2.14 m (7 ft 1/4 in)	
8	Ryan Grinnell	Boise State	2.14 m (7 ft 1/4 in)	
9	Justin Frick	Princeton	2.14 m (7 ft 1/4 in)	
10	Marlon Woods	Norfolk St.	2.09 m (6 ft 10 1/4 in)	
10	Joel Hargett	Texas	2.09 m (6 ft 10 1/4 in)	

==== Pole vault ====
Rank	Name	University	Height	Notes
1st place, gold medalist(s)	Rory Quiller	Binghamton	5.50 m (18 ft 1/2 in)	
2nd place, silver medalist(s)	Mitch Greeley	Clemson	5.40 m (17 ft 8 1/2 in)	
3rd place, bronze medalist(s)	Maston Wallace	Texas	5.40 m (17 ft 8 1/2 in)	
4	Graeme Hoste	Stanford	5.40 m (17 ft 8 1/2 in)	
5	Yavgeniy Olhovsky Israel	Virginia Tech	5.40 m (17 ft 8 1/2 in)	
6	Michael Hogue	Tennessee	5.30 m (17 ft 4 1/2 in)	
7	Dustin DeLeo	UCLA	5.30 m (17 ft 4 1/2 in)	
7	Matt Weirich	BYU	5.30 m (17 ft 4 1/2 in)	
9	Jordan Scott	Kansas	5.30 m (17 ft 4 1/2 in)	
10	Bob Low	BYU	5.20 m (17 ft 1/2 in)	
10	Scott Roth	Washington	5.20 m (17 ft 1/2 in)	
10	Brian Porter	Texas Tech	5.20 m (17 ft 1/2 in)	
10	Elliott Haynie	Gardner-Webb	5.20 m (17 ft 1/2 in)	
10	Daniel Imlach	Sac State	5.20 m (17 ft 1/2 in)	

==== Long jump ====
Rank	Name	University	Distance	Notes
1st place, gold medalist(s)	Reindell Cole	Northridge	8.12 m (26 ft 7 1/2 in)	
2nd place, silver medalist(s)	Norris Frederick	Washington	7.99 m (26 ft 2 1/2 in)	
3rd place, bronze medalist(s)	Ngonidzashe Makusha Zimbabwe	Florida State	7.97 m (26 ft 1 3/4 in)	
4	Julian Reid Jamaica	Texas A&M	7.92 m (25 ft 11 3/4 in)	
5	Justin Gunn	Mississippi	7.92 m (25 ft 11 3/4 in)	
6	Dexter Adams	NC State	7.89 m (25 ft 10 1/2 in)	
7	Alain Bailey Jamaica	Arkansas	7.88 m (25 ft 10 in)	
8	Matt Turner	Arizona State	7.83 m (25 ft 8 1/4 in)	
9	Luis Rivera-Morales Mexico	Arizona	7.80 m (25 ft 7 in)	
10	Rudon Bastian	Louisville	7.61 m (24 ft 11 1/2 in)	

==== Triple jump ====
Rank	Name	University	Distance	Notes
1st place, gold medalist(s)	Nkosinza Balumbu	Arkansas	16.54 m (54 ft 3 in)	
2nd place, silver medalist(s)	Tydree Lewis	Oklahoma	16.52 m (54 ft 2 1/4 in)	
3rd place, bronze medalist(s)	Jonathan Jackson	TCU	16.32 m (53 ft 6 1/2 in)	
4	Muhammad Halim	Cornell	16.25 m (53 ft 3 3/4 in)	
5	Anthony Flemons	Texas Tech	16.11 m (52 ft 10 1/4 in)	
6	Ryan Grinnell	Boise State	15.93 m (52 ft 3 in)	
7	Shardae Boutte	Oklahoma	15.92 m (52 ft 2 3/4 in)	
8	Rayon Taylor	Florida State	15.89 m (52 ft 1 1/2 in)	
9	Zuheir Sharif	Texas A&M	15.76 m (51 ft 8 1/4 in)	
10	James Lemons	Georgia Tech	15.70 m (51 ft 6 in)	

==== Shot put ====
Rank	Name	University	Distance	Notes
1st place, gold medalist(s)	Ryan Whiting	Arizona State	21.73 m (71 ft 3 1/2 in)	
2nd place, silver medalist(s)	Russ Winger	Idaho	21.29 m (69 ft 10 in)	
3rd place, bronze medalist(s)	Milan Jotanovic	Manhattan	19.64 m (64 ft 5 in)	
4	John Caulfield	UCLA	18.95 m (62 ft 2 in)	
5	Zack Lloyd	Arizona	18.63 m (61 ft 1 1/4 in)	
6	Darius Savage	UCLA	18.60 m (61 ft 1/4 in)	
7	John Hickey	Iowa	18.50 m (60 ft 8 1/4 in)	
8	Auston Papay	Akron	18.49 m (60 ft 7 3/4 in)	
9	Kyle Helf	Georgia	18.02 m (59 ft 1 1/4 in)	
10	Beau Burroughs	Florida	17.95 m (58 ft 10 1/2 in)	

==== Weight throw ====
Rank	Name	University	Distance	Notes
1st place, gold medalist(s)	Egor Agafonov	Kansas	22.71 m (74 ft 6 in)	
2nd place, silver medalist(s)	Jake Dunkleberger	Auburn	22.24 m (72 ft 11 1/2 in)	
3rd place, bronze medalist(s)	Walter Henning	North Carolina	22.02 m (72 ft 2 3/4 in)	
4	Jon Pullum	Purdue	22.02 m (72 ft 2 3/4 in)	
5	Simon Wardhaugh	Boise State	21.93 m (71 ft 11 1/4 in)	
6	Matthew Wauters	Idaho	21.56 m (70 ft 8 3/4 in)	
7	Boldizsar Kocsor	UCLA	21.37 m (70 ft 1 1/4 in)	
8	Chris Rohr	Missouri	21.34 m (70 ft 0 in)	
9	Jason Schutz	Colorado St.	20.98 m (68 ft 9 3/4 in)	
10	Lenny Jatsek	Ohio State	20.77 m (68 ft 1 1/2 in)	

==== Heptathlon ====
Rank	Name	University	Score	Notes
1st place, gold medalist(s)	Gonzalo Barroilhet Chile	Florida State	5951	
2nd place, silver medalist(s)	Josh Hustedt	Stanford	5836	
3rd place, bronze medalist(s)	Mike Morrison	Florida	5792	
4	Nick Adcock	Missouri	5776	
5	Jangy Addy Liberia	Tennessee	5683	
6	Ashton Eaton	Oregon	5676	
7	Raven Cepeda	Northern Iowa	5657	
8	Rok Derzanic	Kansas State	5645	
9	Justin Johnson	Cal State-Northridge	5623	
10	Mateo Sossah	North Carolina	5621	

=== Women's results ===
==== w60 meters ====
Rank	Name	University	Time	Notes
1st place, gold medalist(s)	Kelly-Ann Baptiste	LSU	7.17	(7.163)
2nd place, silver medalist(s)	Alexandria Anderson	Texas	7.17	(7.169)
3rd place, bronze medalist(s)	Bianca Knight	Texas	7.21	
4	Lakecia Ealey	Florida	7.23	
5	Samantha Henry	LSU	7.24	
6	Nickesha Anderson	Kansas	7.28	
7	Gloria Asumnu	Tulane	7.29	
8	Courtney Champion	Tennessee	7.36	

==== w200 meters ====
Rank	Name	University	Time	Heat
1st place, gold medalist(s)	Bianca Knight	Texas	22.40	2
2nd place, silver medalist(s)	Nickesha Anderson	Kansas	22.62	2
3rd place, bronze medalist(s)	Alexandria Anderson	Texas	22.81	2
4	Porscha Lucas	Texas A&M	22.83	2
5	Simone Facey	Texas A&M	22.94	1
6	Natalie Knight	Florida	23.14	1
7	Virgil Hodge	TCU	23.20	1
8	Courtney Champion	Tennessee	23.36	1

==== w400 meters ====
Rank	Name	University	Time	Heat
1st place, gold medalist(s)	Krista Simkins	Miami	52.16	2
2nd place, silver medalist(s)	Trish Bartholomew	Alabama	52.37	2
3rd place, bronze medalist(s)	Jessica Beard	Texas A&M	52.48	2
4	Shana Cox	Penn State	52.57	1
5	Kineke Alexander	Iowa	52.72	2
6	Jenna Martin	Kentucky	53.15	1
7	Sheryl Morgan	Nebraska	53.53	1
8	Kenyata Coleman	Mississippi	54.60	1

==== w800 meters ====
Rank	Name	University	Time	Notes
1st place, gold medalist(s)	Latavia Thomas	LSU	2:05.07	
2nd place, silver medalist(s)	Heather Dorniden	Minnesota	2:05.45	
3rd place, bronze medalist(s)	Alysia Johnson	California	2:05.47	
4	Geena Gall	Michigan	2:05.79	
5	Becky Horn	W. Michigan	2:05.83	
6	Jesse Carlin	Pennsylvania	2:06.48	
7	Trisa Nickoley	Missouri	2:06.69	
8	Lavera Morris	Kentucky	2:07.38	

==== wMile ====
Rank	Name	University	Time	Notes
1st place, gold medalist(s)	Hannah England	Florida State	4:35.30	
2nd place, silver medalist(s)	Nicole Edwards	Michigan	4:35.74	
3rd place, bronze medalist(s)	Sarah Bowman	Tennessee	4:36.00	
4	Dacia Barr	Arkansas	4:41.02	
5	Amanda Miller	Washington	4:41.56	
6	Katie Follett	Washington	4:41.88	
7	Elizabeth Maloy	Georgetown	4:44.25	
8	Ann Detmer	Wisconsin	4:44.79	
9	Michelle Turner	Washington	4:48.24	
10	Alicia Follmar	Stanford	4:52.30	

==== w3000 meters ====
Rank	Name	University	Time	Notes
1st place, gold medalist(s)	Susan Kuijken	Florida State	8:58.14	
2nd place, silver medalist(s)	Brie Felnagle	North Carolina	9:00.31	
3rd place, bronze medalist(s)	Arianna Lambie	Stanford	9:05.41	
4	Lauren Centrowitz	Stanford	9:11.09	
5	Marisa Ryan	Boston Univ.	9:12.83	
6	Nicole Bush	Michigan St.	9:13.48	
7	Marie-Louise Asselin	West Virginia	9:14.44	
8	Lauren Hagans	Baylor	9:15.12	
9	Lisa Koll	Iowa St.	9:15.58	
10	Bridget Franek	Penn State	9:20.28	

==== w5000 meters ====
Rank	Name	University	Time	Notes
1st place, gold medalist(s)	Sally Kipyego	Texas Tech	15:31.91	
2nd place, silver medalist(s)	Lisa Koll	Iowa St.	15:54.90	
3rd place, bronze medalist(s)	Maddie McKeever	Duke	15:58.18	
4	Nicole Bush	Michigan St.	16:03.27	
5	Katrina Rundhaug	Wisconsin	16:05.02	
6	Melissa Grelli	Georgetown	16:10.83	
7	Bridget Franek	Penn State	16:18.01	
8	Elizabeth Ambrus	UAB	16:18.92	
9	Emily Harrison	Virginia	16:19.85	
10	Denise Bargiachi	Arkansas	16:25.79	

==== w60 meters hurdles ====
Rank	Name	University	Time	Notes
1st place, gold medalist(s)	Tiffany Ofili	Michigan	7.94	
2nd place, silver medalist(s)	Kristi Castlin	Virginia Tech	8.02	
3rd place, bronze medalist(s)	Queen Harrison	Virginia Tech	8.03	
4	Shantia Moss	Georgia Tech	8.08	(8.075)
5	Jessica Ohanaja	LSU	8.08	(8.080)
6	Nickiesha Wilson	LSU	8.12	
7	Fatmata Fofanah	Georgia Tech	8.13	
8	Aleesha Barber	Penn State	8.19	

==== w4x400 meters relay ====
Rank	Name	University	Time	Notes
1st place, gold medalist(s)	LSU	Brooklynn Morris, Nickiesha Wilson Jamaica, Latavia Thomas, Deonna Lawrence	3:31.14	
2nd place, silver medalist(s)	Texas A&M	Sandy Wooten, Simone Facey Jamaica, Jennifer Williams, Jessica Beard	3:31.34	
3rd place, bronze medalist(s)	Arizona State	Dominique' Maloy, Shauntel Elcock, Jordan Durham, Jeavon Benjamin	3:33.63	
4	Texas	Alexandria Anderson, Katara Rosby, Bianca Knight, Temeka Kincy	3:33.69	
5	Penn State	Dominique Blake Jamaica, Shana Cox, Aleesha Barber Trinidad and Tobago, Wendy Dorr	3:34.00	(3:33.991)
6	South Carolina	Krystal Cantey, Brandi Cross, Faraign Giles, Porche Byrd	3:34.00	(3:33.992)
7	Arkansas	Courtenay Brown, Tominque Boatright, Shelise Williams, Paige Farrell	3:34.66	
8	Tennessee	Latonya Loche, Brittany Jones, Kimarra McDonald Jamaica, Phoebe Wright	3:35.85	
9	Miami	Krista Simkins, Takecia Jameson, Ti'erra Brown, Kristy Whyte	3:36.57	
10	Kansas	Sha'Ray Butler, Charity Stowers, Crystal Manning, Nickesha Anderson	3:37.48	

==== wDistance medley relay ====
Rank	Name	University	Time	Notes
1st place, gold medalist(s)	Tennessee	Brittany Sheffey, Brittany Jones, Phoebe Wright, Sarah Bowman	11:01.97	
2nd place, silver medalist(s)	Michigan	Danielle Tauro, Serita Williams, Geena Gall, Nicole Edwards Canada	11:02.22	
3rd place, bronze medalist(s)	Stanford	Lauren Centrowitz, Idara Otu Nigeria, Alicia Follmar, Arianna Lambie	11:03.87	
4	West Virginia	Marie-Louise Asselin, April Rotilio, Karly Hamric, Keri Bland	11:07.64	
5	Brigham Young	Carlee Clark-Platt, Stacy Slight, Katie Palmer, Angela Wagner	11:10.96	
6	Illinois	Danelle Woods, Omoye Ugiagbe, Rachel Hernandez, Angela Bizzarri	11:12.33	
7	Pennsylvania	Claire Kim, Shaunee Morgan, Jesse Carlin, Stacy Kim	11:14.97	
8	Baylor	Danielle Bradley, Carla Grace, Nichole Jones, Lauren Hagans	11:20.56	
9	Oregon	Alexandra Kosinski, Keshia Baker, Zoe Buckman Australia, Nicole Blood	11:22.06	
10	Minnesota	Gabriele Anderson, Rikita Butler, Heather Dorniden, Jamie Cheever	11:24.83	

==== wHigh jump ====
Rank	Name	University	Height	Notes
1st place, gold medalist(s)	Ebba Jungmark Sweden	Washington St.	1.89 m (6 ft 2 1/4 in)	
2nd place, silver medalist(s)	Sharon Day	Cal Poly-SLO	1.86 m (6 ft 1 in)	
3rd place, bronze medalist(s)	Brittney Reese	Mississippi	1.86 m (6 ft 1 in)	
4	Becky Christensen	Harvard	1.83 m (6 ft 0 in)	
5	Carin Knight	Connecticut	1.83 m (6 ft 0 in)	
6	Jasmin Day	Arizona	1.83 m (6 ft 0 in)	
7	Patience Coleman	North Carolina	1.80 m (5 ft 10 3/4 in)	
7	Epley Bullock	Nebraska	1.80 m (5 ft 10 3/4 in)	
9	Lizzie Harris	Central Florida	1.80 m (5 ft 10 3/4 in)	
9	Jacquelyn Johnson	Arizona State	1.80 m (5 ft 10 3/4 in)	
9	Viktoria Andonova	Miami	1.80 m (5 ft 10 3/4 in)	

==== wPole vault ====
Rank	Name	University	Height	Notes
1st place, gold medalist(s)	Ellie Rudy	Montana St.	4.30 m (14 ft 1 1/4 in)	
2nd place, silver medalist(s)	April Kubishta	Arizona State	4.30 m (14 ft 1 1/4 in)	
3rd place, bronze medalist(s)	Kate Sultanova	Kansas	4.25 m (13 ft 11 1/4 in)	
4	Alicia Rue	Minnesota	4.25 m (13 ft 11 1/4 in)	
5	Denise vonEynatten	S. Florida	4.25 m (13 ft 11 1/4 in)	
6	Mallory Peck	Purdue	4.20 m (13 ft 9 1/4 in)	
7	Kelley DiVesta	Washington	4.20 m (13 ft 9 1/4 in)	
8	Stephanie Bagan	San Diego St.	4.10 m (13 ft 5 1/4 in)	
8	Melissa Gergel	Oregon	4.10 m (13 ft 5 1/4 in)	
8	Tori Anthony	UCLA	4.10 m (13 ft 5 1/4 in)	

==== wLong jump ====
Rank	Name	University	Time	Notes
1st place, gold medalist(s)	Brittney Reese	Mississippi	6.76 m (22 ft 2 in)	
2nd place, silver medalist(s)	Blessing Okagbare Nigeria	UTEP	6.68 m (21 ft 10 3/4 in)	
3rd place, bronze medalist(s)	Natasha Harvey	Jacksonville	6.60 m (21 ft 7 3/4 in)	
4	Erica McLain	Stanford	6.50 m (21 ft 3 3/4 in)	
5	Jacquelyn Johnson	Arizona State	6.31 m (20 ft 8 1/4 in)	
6	Stephanie Garnett	Arizona State	6.30 m (20 ft 8 in)	
7	Andrea Linton	LSU	6.24 m (20 ft 5 1/2 in)	
8	Jeomi Maduka	Cornell	6.23 m (20 ft 5 1/4 in)	
9	Neidra Covington	TCU	6.22 m (20 ft 4 3/4 in)	
10	Arantxa King Bermuda	Stanford	6.19 m (20 ft 3 1/2 in)	

==== wTriple jump ====
Rank	Name	University	Time	Notes
1st place, gold medalist(s)	Erica McLain	Stanford	14.20 m (46 ft 7 in)	
2nd place, silver medalist(s)	Kimberly Williams	Florida State	13.82 m (45 ft 4 in)	
3rd place, bronze medalist(s)	Karoline Koehler	San Diego St.	13.62 m (44 ft 8 in)	
4	Blessing Okagbare Nigeria	UTEP	13.57 m (44 ft 6 1/4 in)	
5	Nelly Tchayem France	UTEP	13.43 m (44 ft 1/2 in)	
6	Tahari James	Boston Univ.	13.42 m (44 ft 1/4 in)	
7	Tamara Highsmith	Connecticut	13.38 m (43 ft 10 3/4 in)	
8	Sarah Nambawa Uganda	M. Tenn. St.	13.37 m (43 ft 10 1/4 in)	
9	Andrea Linton	LSU	13.28 m (43 ft 6 3/4 in)	
10	Seidre Forde	Louisville	13.24 m (43 ft 5 1/4 in)	

==== wShot put ====
Rank	Name	University	Time	Notes
1st place, gold medalist(s)	Mariam Kevkhishvili Georgia	Florida	17.83 m (58 ft 5 3/4 in)	
2nd place, silver medalist(s)	Sarah Stevens	Arizona State	17.64 m (57 ft 10 1/4 in)	
3rd place, bronze medalist(s)	Patience Knight	Texas Tech	17.27 m (56 ft 7 3/4 in)	
4	Susan King	Memphis	16.91 m (55 ft 5 1/2 in)	
5	Jessica Pressley	Arizona State	16.77 m (55 ft 0 in)	
6	Shernelle Nicholls	Missouri	16.71 m (54 ft 9 3/4 in)	
7	Brittany Pryor	Virginia Tech	16.64 m (54 ft 7 in)	
8	Stephanie Horton	Kansas	16.60 m (54 ft 5 1/2 in)	
9	Aja Evans	Illinois	16.38 m (53 ft 8 3/4 in)	
10	Annie Alexander	Tennessee	16.34 m (53 ft 7 1/4 in)	

==== Weight throw ====
Rank	Name	University	Time	Notes
1st place, gold medalist(s)	Brittany Riley	Southern Illinois	25.34 m (83 ft 1 1/2 in)	
2nd place, silver medalist(s)	Jessica Pressley	Arizona State	22.04 m (72 ft 3 1/2 in)	
3rd place, bronze medalist(s)	Astin Steward	Purdue	21.62 m (70 ft 11 in)	
4	Veronica Jatsek	Ohio State	21.43 m (70 ft 3 1/2 in)	
5	Stevi Large	Akron	21.08 m (69 ft 1 3/4 in)	
6	Loren Groves	Kansas State	20.93 m (68 ft 8 in)	
7	Kristen Callan	Virginia Tech	20.71 m (67 ft 11 1/4 in)	
8	Shawneise Williams	Florida	20.34 m (66 ft 8 3/4 in)	
9	Sarah Stevens	Arizona State	20.32 m (66 ft 8 in)	
10	Laci Heller	Kansas State	19.78 m (64 ft 10 1/2 in)	

==== wPentathlon ====
Rank	Name	University	Score	Notes
1st place, gold medalist(s)	Jacquelyn Johnson	Arizona State	4496	
2nd place, silver medalist(s)	Bettie Wade	Michigan	4366	
3rd place, bronze medalist(s)	Shevell Quinley	Arizona	4256	
4	Annett Wichmann	Hawaii-Manoa	4177	
5	Gayle Hunter	Penn State	4141	
6	Liz Roehrig	Minnesota	4137	
7	Julianne Kennedy	Texas Tech	4116	
8	Charlotte Abrahamsen	Memphis	4103	
9	Alyissa Hasan	Notre Dame	4069	
10	Marissa Harris	Mississippi State	4059	

== See also ==
- NCAA Men's Division I Indoor Track and Field Championships
- NCAA Women's Division I Indoor Track and Field Championships
