= Athletics at the 2007 Pan American Games – Men's 200 metres =

Men's 200 metres at the Pan American Games
- Venue: Estádio Olímpico João Havelange
- Dates: July 25–27
- Competitors: 28 from 23 nations
- Winning time: 20.37

Medalists
Gold medal	Brendan Christian	Antigua and Barbuda
Silver medal	Marvin Anderson	Jamaica
Bronze medal	Rubin Williams	United States

The men's 200 metres event at the 2007 Pan American Games was held on July 25–27.

== Medalists ==
Gold	Silver	Bronze
Brendan Christian; Antigua and Barbuda	Marvin Anderson; Jamaica	Rubin Williams; United States

== Results ==
=== Heats ===
Qualification: First 3 of each heat (Q) and the next 4 fastest (q) qualified for the semifinals.

Wind:
Heat 1: +0.5 m/s, Heat 2: +0.5 m/s, Heat 3: +0.4 m/s, Heat 4: 0.0 m/s

Rank	Heat	Name	Nationality	Time	Notes
1	1	Brendan Christian	Antigua and Barbuda	20.51	Q, SB
2	1	Marvin Anderson	Jamaica	20.59	Q
3	4	Jordan Vaden	United States	20.67	Q
4	3	Rubin Williams	United States	20.72	Q
5	2	Bryan Barnett	Canada	20.75	Q
6	3	Sandro Viana	Brazil	20.78	Q
7	2	Michael Matheau	Bahamas	20.88	Q
8	1	Jared Connaughton	Canada	20.90	Q
9	4	Daniel Grueso	Colombia	20.92	Q
10	3	Emmanuel Callender	Trinidad and Tobago	20.93	Q
11	3	Franklin Nazareno	Ecuador	20.96	q
12	2	Michael Herrera	Cuba	21.06	Q
13	4	Basílio de Moraes Júnior	Brazil	21.11	Q
14	3	Ramon Gittens	Barbados	21.12	q, SB
15	1	Tyrell Cuffy	Cayman Islands	21.15	q
16	4	Jacobi Mitchell	Bahamas	21.22	q
17	2	Juan Pedro Toledo	Mexico	21.24	
18	2	Rolando Palacios	Honduras	21.27	
19	1	Heber Viera	Uruguay	21.29	
20	2	Xavier Brown	Jamaica	21.38	
21	4	Robert Morton	Saint Kitts and Nevis	21.44	
22	3	Courtny Bascombe	Saint Vincent and the Grenadines	22.19	
22	4	Joel Báez	Dominican Republic	22.19	
24	2	Kevin Fahie	British Virgin Islands	22.30	
25	1	Edwin Cecilio Baltazar	Guatemala	22.66	
	1	Ivan Altamirano	Argentina	DNF	
	4	Jurgen Themen	Suriname	DNF	
	3	Nicolas Lopez Moreira	Paraguay	DNS	

=== Semifinals ===
Qualification: First 4 of each semifinal (Q) qualified directly for the final.

Wind:
Heat 1: +0.7 m/s, Heat 2: +0.1 m/s

Rank	Heat	Name	Nationality	Time	Notes
1	1	Brendan Christian	Antigua and Barbuda	20.33	Q, SB
2	2	Marvin Anderson	Jamaica	20.35	Q
3	1	Jordan Vaden	United States	20.54	Q
4	2	Rubin Williams	United States	20.66	Q
5	1	Michael Herrera	Cuba	20.74	Q
6	2	Michael Matheau	Bahamas	20.80	Q, PB
7	1	Sandro Viana	Brazil	20.82	Q
7	2	Emmanuel Callender	Trinidad and Tobago	20.82	Q
9	1	Jared Connaughton	Canada	20.85	
10	2	Bryan Barnett	Canada	20.89	
11	1	Daniel Grueso	Colombia	20.96	
12	2	Franklin Nazareno	Ecuador	21.02	
13	1	Tyrell Cuffy	Cayman Islands	21.20	
14	2	Ramon Gittens	Barbados	21.21	
15	2	Basílio de Moraes Júnior	Brazil	21.22	
16	1	Jacobi Mitchell	Bahamas	21.79	

=== Final ===
Wind: +0.8 m/s

Rank	Lane	Name	Nationality	Time	Notes
1st place, gold medalist(s)	6	Brendan Christian	Antigua and Barbuda	20.37	
2nd place, silver medalist(s)	5	Marvin Anderson	Jamaica	20.38	
3rd place, bronze medalist(s)	4	Rubin Williams	United States	20.57	
4	7	Michael Matheau	Bahamas	20.89	
5	2	Emmanuel Callender	Trinidad and Tobago	21.03	
	8	Sandro Viana	Brazil	DQ	
	1	Michael Herrera	Cuba	DNF	
	3	Jordan Vaden	United States	DNS	
