= 2011 USA Indoor Track and Field Championships =

- Dates: February 26–27
- Host city: Albuquerque, New Mexico, United States
- Venue: Albuquerque Convention Center
- Level: Senior
- Type: Indoor
- Events: 26 (men: 13; women: 13) + 2

The 2011 USA Indoor Track and Field Championships was held at Albuquerque Convention Center in Albuquerque, New Mexico. Organized by USA Track and Field (USATF), the two-day competition took place February 26–27 and served as the national championships in indoor track and field for the United States. The championships in combined track and field events were held two weeks later from March 5–6 at Gladstein Fieldhouse at Indiana University Bloomington, Indiana.

Two American national records were set at the competition: Jenn Suhr cleared 4.86 m (15 ft 11 1/4 in) in the pole vault and Jillian Camarena-Williams threw 19.87 m (65 ft 2 1/4 in) in the shot put. Jenny Simpson completed a middle-distance double in the mile run and 3000 meters. Four athletes successfully defended their national titles from 2010: Bernard Lagat (3000 m), Jesse Williams (high jump), Camarena-Williams (shot put), Amber Campbell (weight throw).

== Medal summary ==
=== Men ===
Event	Gold		Silver		Bronze	
60 metres	Mike Rodgers	6.48 PB	D'Angelo Cherry	6.54	Rubin Williams	6.61
400 metres	Michael Courtney	46.11	Tavaris Tate	46.53	James Howell	46.57 PB
800 metres	Duane Solomon	1:48.03	Tetlo Emmen	1:48.35	Mark Wieczorek	1:48.38
Mile run	Jeff See	4:04.63	Aaron Braun	4:04.83	Garrett Heath	4:04.91
3000 metres	Bernard Lagat	7:57.17	Galen Rupp	7:59.91	Aaron Braun	8:02.59
60 m hurdles	Omo Osaghae	7.52 PB	Kevin Craddock	7.58	Jason Richardson	7.60
3000 m walk	Patrick Stroupe	12:31.24	Dan Serianni	13:08.85	Alejandro Chavez	13:12.58
High jump	Jesse Williams	2.28	Jamie Nieto	2.25	James Harris	2.25 PB
Pole vault	Mark Hollis	5.60	Jason Colwick	5.40	Rory Quiller	5.40
Long jump	Jeremy Hicks	7.67	Jarod Tobler	7.64	Chaz Thomas	7.56 PB
Triple jump	Rafeeq Curry	16.88 PB	Alphonso Jordan	16.57 PB	Brandon Roulhac	16.56
Shot put	Ryan Whiting	21.35	Dan Taylor	20.19	Adam Nelson	20.15
Weight throw	Jake Freeman	24.08	A. G. Kruger	23.73	Michael Mai	23.72 PB
Heptathlon	Nick Adcock	5711 pts	Patrick Woods	5700 pts	Chris Helwick	5681 pts

=== Women ===
Event	Gold		Silver		Bronze	
60 metres	Alexandria Anderson	7.12 PB	Carmelita Jeter	7.13	Shalonda Solomon	7.15 PB
400 metres	Natasha Hastings	50.83	DeeDee Trotter	51.36	Mary Wineberg	51.56
800 metres	Phoebe Wright	2:02.27	Erica Moore	2:02.92 PB	Heather Kampf	2:04.30
Mile run	Jenny Simpson	4:34.96	Heidi Dahl	4:36.35 PB	Gabrielle Anderson	4:36.64
3000 metres	Jenny Simpson	9:02.20	Sara Hall	9:03.91	Allie Kieffer	9:35.89
60 m hurdles	Kellie Wells	7.79 PB	Nichole Denby	8.00	Yvette Lewis	8.03
3000 m walk	Maria Michta	13:40.52	Erin Bresnahan	14:22.55	Teresa Vaill	14:48.21
High jump	Epley Bullock	1.86	Becky Christensen	1.83	Megan Seidl	1.80
Pole vault	Jenn Suhr	4.86 AR	Becky Holliday	4.55	Melinda Owen	4.55 PB
Long jump	Janay DeLoach	6.99 PB	Brittney Reese	6.86	Funmi Jimoh	6.66
Triple jump	Shakeema Welsch	13.66	Amanda Smock	13.63	Toni Smith	13.62
Shot put	Jillian Camarena-Williams	19.87 AR	Sarah Stevens-Walker	17.96	Chandra Brewer	16.32
Weight throw	Amber Campbell	24.21	Loree Smith	22.11	Kristin Smith	20.97 PB
Pentathlon	Bettie Wade	4439 pts	Abbie Stechschulte	4337 pts	Janay DeLoach	4289 pts
