= Nicole Gamble =

American athletics competitor (born 1977)

Personal information
- Born: June 21, 1977 (age 49) Sumter, South Carolina, U.S.

Sport
- Country: United States
- Sport: Athletics
- Event: Triple jump

Nicole Gamble (born June 21, 1977) is a retired American triple jumper.

Competing for the North Carolina Tar Heels track and field team, Gamble won the 1999 triple jump at the NCAA Division I Indoor Track and Field Championships with a mark of 14.05 meters.

She competed at the 1994 World Junior Championships, the 1996 World Junior Championships and the 2000 Summer Olympics without reaching the final. Her personal best jump was 14.05 meters, achieved indoors in March 1999 in Indianapolis.

Gamble was born in Sumter, South Carolina.
