= 2010 USA Outdoor Track and Field Championships =

- Dates: June 23–27
- Host city: Des Moines, Iowa, United States
- Venue: Drake Stadium
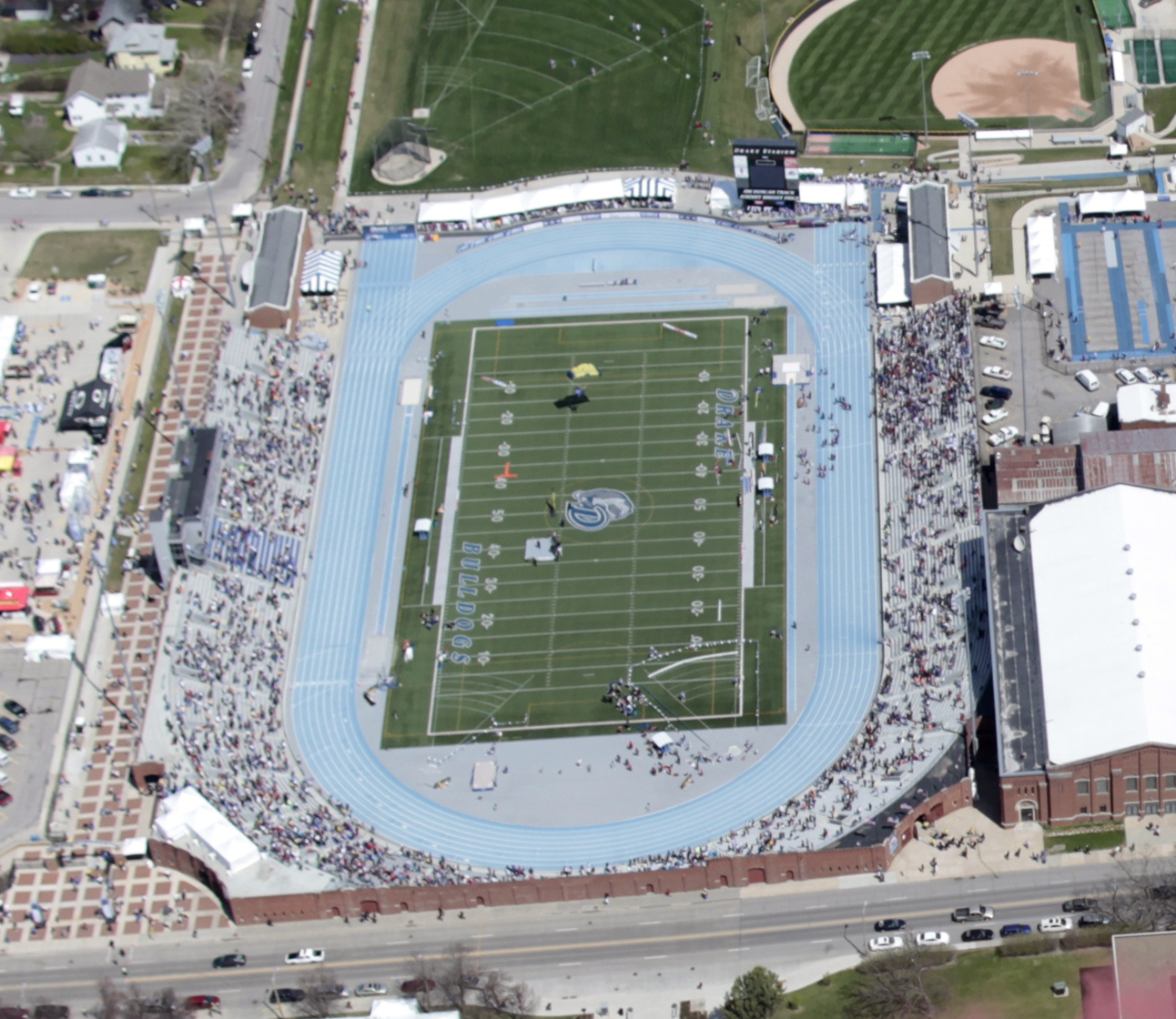
- Level: Senior
- Type: Outdoor
- Events: 40 (men: 20; women: 20)
- Records set: 5

The 2010 USA Outdoor Track and Field Championships were held at Drake Stadium, Drake University in Des Moines, Iowa on June 23–27, 2010. In order to boost the visibility of this event, USATF sponsored a member appreciation tent at the event and promoted the entire week as "Membership appreciation week." Highlights of the meet were televised on ESPN and NBC.

== Results ==
=== Men track events ===
Event	Gold		Silver		Bronze	
100 m Wind : -1.5 m/s	Walter Dix	10.04	Trell Kimmons	10.27	Ivory Williams	10.29
200 m Wind : +2.9 m/s	Wallace Spearmon	19.77	Walter Dix	20.14	Xavier Carter	20.29
400 m	Greg Nixon	44.61	LeJerald Betters	44.71	Jamaal Torrence	44.80
800 m	Nick Symmonds	1:45.98	Duane Solomon	1:47.16	Jacob Hernandez	1:47.23
1500 m	Lopez Lomong	3:50.83	Leonel Manzano	3:50.91	Will Leer	3:51.63
5000 m	Bernard Lagat	13:54.08	Tim Nelson	13:54.80	Andrew Bumbalough	13:55.16
10,000 m	Galen Rupp	28:59.29	Edward Moran	29:03.07	Patrick Smyth	29:18.13
3000 m steeplechase	Daniel Huling	8:27.87	Ben Bruce	8:30.87	Steve Slattery	8:33.23
20 km walk	John Nunn	1:29:21.60	Timothy Seaman	1:33:10.21	Patrick Stroupe	1:34:53.30
110 m hurdles Wind : +1.7 m/s	David Oliver	12.93	Ryan Wilson	13.17	Ronnie Ash	13.19
400 m hurdles	Bershawn Jackson	47.32	Johnny Dutch	47.63	Michael Tinsley	48.72

=== Men field events ===
Event	Gold		Silver		Bronze	
High jump	Jesse Williams	2.26m	Tora Harris	2.26m	Jamie Nieto	2.23m
Long jump	Dwight Phillips	8.37m	Trevell Quinley	8.20m	Chris Phipps	8.12m
Triple jump	Kenta Bell	17.02m	Christian Taylor	16.76m	Lawrence Willis	16.69m
Pole vault	Mark Hollis	5.60m	Derek Miles	5.60m	Jason Colwick	5.50m
Shot put	Christian Cantwell	21.65m	Reese Hoffa	21.33m	Adam Nelson	20.84m
Discus throw	Casey Malone	62.57m	Jason Young	61.15m	Jarred Rome	61.03m
Hammer throw	Jake Freeman	76.51m	Kibwe Johnson	76.31m	Andrew Loftin	75.42m
Javelin throw	Sean Furey	79.86m	Mike Hazle	78.91m	Craig Kinsley	78.10m
Decathlon	Jake Arnold	8215	Tom Pappas	8101	Joe Detmer	8009

=== Women track events ===
Event	Gold		Silver		Bronze	
100 m Wind : -2.5 m/s	Allyson Felix	11.27	LaShaunte'a Moore	11.34	Tianna Madison	11.43
200 m Wind : +0.6 m/s	Consuella Moore	22.40	Shalonda Solomon	22.47	Porscha Lucas	22.57
400 m	Debbie Dunn	49.64	Francena McCorory	50.52	Natasha Hastings	50.53
800 m	Alysia Johnson	1:59.87	Maggie Vessey	2:00.43	Phoebe Wright	2:00.47
1500 m	Anna Pierce	4:13.65	Erin Donohue	4:13.87	Shannon Rowbury	4:14.41
5000 m	Lauren Fleshman	15:28.70	Molly Huddle	15:30.89	Jenny Barringer	15:33.33
10,000 m	Amy Begley	32:06.45	Lisa Koll	32:11.72	Desiree Davila	32:22.32
3000 m steeplechase	Lisa Aguilera	9:53.59	Nicole Bush	9:56.08	Lindsay Allen	9:59.19
20 km walk	Maria Michta	1:39:46.12	Joanne Dow	1:43:18.14	Lauren Forgues	1:44:37.68
100 m hurdles Wind : -2.1 m/s	Lolo Jones	12.69	Kellie Wells	12.84	Damu Cherry	12.86
400 m hurdles	Ti'erra Brown	54.85	Nicole Leach	55.83	Wendy Fawn Dorr	55.99

=== Women field events ===
Event	Gold		Silver		Bronze	
High jump	Chaunte Lowe	2.05m NR	Liz Patterson	1.91m	Brigetta Barrett	1.91m
Pole vault	Jenn Suhr	4.89m	Becky Holliday	4.60m	Mary Saxer	4.50m
Long jump	Brittney Reese	7.08m	Chaunte Lowe	6.90m	Brianna Glenn	6.81m
Triple jump	Erica McLain	14.18m	Shakeema Welsch	14.07m	Toni Smith	13.69m
Shot put	Jillian Camarena	19.13m	Michelle Carter	18.46m	Sarah Stevens	18.23m
Discus throw	Becky Breisch	63.34m	Gia Lewis-Smallwood	62.18m	Stephanie Brown Trafton	59.98m
Hammer throw	Amber Campbell	71.52m	Jessica Cosby	71.24m	Britney Henry	69.57m
Javelin throw	Kara Patterson	66.67m NR	Rachel Yurkovich	56.31m	Alicia DeShasier	55.53m
Heptathlon	Alex Gochenour	5300	Ashley Smith	5270	Whitney Fountain	5197
