= Rubin Williams (sprinter) =

American sprinter

Personal information
- Born: July 9, 1983 (age 43)

Sport
- Country: United States
- Sport: Athletics
- Event: Sprinting
Medal record
Pan American Games
Bronze medal – third place	2007 Rio de Janeiro	200 meters
Bronze medal – third place	2007 Rio de Janeiro	4 x 100 m
Bronze medal – third place	2011 Guadalajara	4 x 100 m

Rubin Williams (born July 9, 1983) is an American former athlete.

Williams grew up in San Jose, California and is a graduate of Valley Christian School. He attended the University of Tennessee and broke the school's 200 meters record, which had been held by Justin Gatlin. At the 2002 World Junior Championships in Kingston, Williams finished fourth in the final of the 200 metres, won by Usain Bolt. In 2007 he was a bronze medalist in the 200 meters at the Pan American Games in Rio de Janeiro. He was 200 meters champion at the 2008 NCAA Indoor Track and Field Championships and came third in the 60 meters at the 2011 USA Indoor Track and Field Championships.
