= Marvin Anderson =

Jamaican sprinter (born 1982)

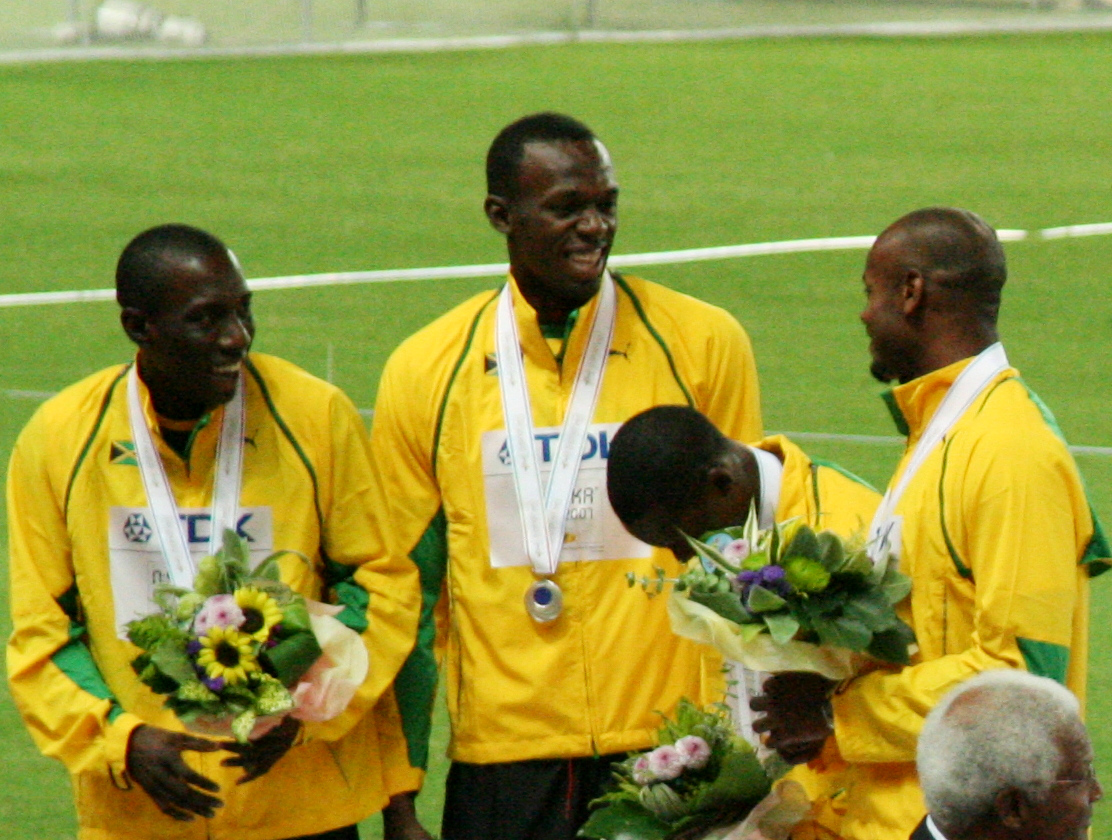
- 2007 World Championships in Athletics in Osaka – Victory ceremony for the men's 4*100 metres relay: Marvin Anderson, Usain Bolt, Nesta Carter, Asafa Powell

Personal information
- Nationality: Jamaica
- Born: 12 May 1982 (age 44) Trelawny
- Height: 1.75 m (5 ft 9 in)
- Weight: 69 kg (152 lb)

Sport
- Sport: Running
- Event(s): 100 metres, 200 metres

Achievements and titles
- Personal best(s): 100 m: 10.11 s (Kingston 2008); 200 m: 20.06 s (Osaka 2007)
Medal record
Men's Athletics
Representing Jamaica
World Championships
Silver medal – second place	2007 Osaka	4×100 m relay
Pan American Games
Silver medal – second place	2007 Rio de Janeiro	200 m
CAC Junior Championships (U20)
Gold medal – first place	2000 San Juan	100 m
Gold medal – first place	2000 San Juan	4x100 m relay
CARIFTA Games Junior (U20)
Silver medal – second place	2001 Bridgetown	4x100 m relay
Bronze medal – third place	2001 Bridgetown	100 m

Marvin Anderson (born 12 May 1982) is a Jamaican sprint athlete.

He finished sixth in the 200m final at the 2007 World Championships in Osaka where he also won a silver medal in the 4 × 100 m relay team for Jamaica. He is a former student of Duncans All Age and William Knibb Memorial High School.

Anderson represented Jamaica at the 2008 Summer Olympics in Beijing. He competed at the 200 metres and placed third in his first round heat after Marlon Devonish and Kim Collins in a time of 20.85 seconds. With this result he qualified for the second round, but he did finish the second race and was eliminated.

He tested positive for the stimulant 4-Methyl-2-hexanamine in June 2009. A disciplinary panel organised by the Jamaican Anti-Doping Commission (JADCO) cleared him of a doping infraction on the grounds that the drug was not on the World Anti-Doping Agency's banned list. However, JADCO appealed their own panel's ruling, stating that the athlete should be disciplined as the drug was similar in structure to the banned substance tuaminoheptane.
