= Drake Stadium (Drake University) =

Multipurpose stadium in Iowa, United States

- "The Blue Oval"
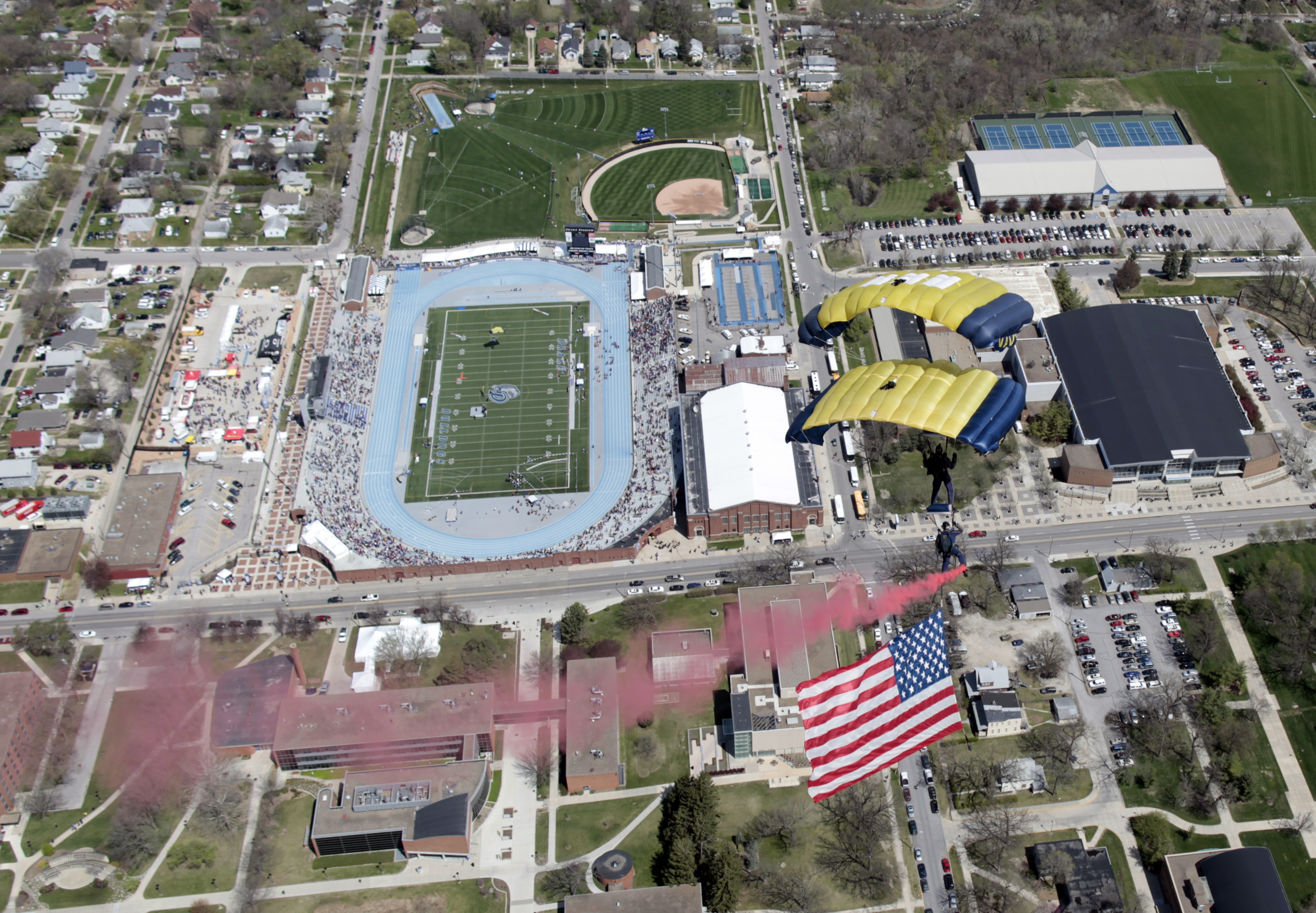
- Interactive map of Drake Stadium
- Location: 2719 Forest Avenue; Des Moines, Iowa, 50311 United States
- Coordinates: 41°36′18″N 93°39′18″W
- Owner: Drake University
- Operator: Drake University
- Capacity: 14,557 (2006–present); 18,000 (1925–2005)
- Surface: FieldTurf
- Public transit: DART

Construction
- Groundbreaking: 1925
- Opened: October 10, 1925
- Renovated: 2005
- Cost: $15 million (2005 renovation)
- Architects: RDG Planning & Design (2005 renovation)

Tenants
- Drake Bulldogs football (NCAA) (1925–present); Drake Relays (1926–present); Des Moines Menace (USL2) (2019–present)

Drake Stadium is a stadium on the campus of Drake University in Des Moines, Iowa, United States. Best known as the home of the Drake Relays, it also serves as the home field of the university's football team. It opened in 1925.

== History ==
Drake Stadium opened on October 10, 1925, as the Bulldogs defeated Kansas.

Drake Stadium has seen the Bulldogs win sixteen conference championships in football, while advancing to five college football bowl games and three FCS playoff games. It is currently the largest stadium in the Pioneer Football League.

Drake Stadium is also the home to the Drake Relays, one of the premier track and field meets in the country. Thousands of high school, college, and professional track athletes come to Drake Stadium in late April to compete in one of the largest track meets in the United States. The prominence of the Relays has led to Drake hosting various other national and regional professional, collegiate, and youth meets. Fourteen world records have been set at the Relays.

The stadium also hosts the Iowa boys and girls high school track state championships.

It also serves as a secondary venue for the university's men's and women's soccer teams. In 2019, the Des Moines Menace, a local USL League Two soccer club, played its home schedule at the stadium.

A statue of Drake football legend Johnny Bright was erected outside of the stadium in October 2026.

== Renovations ==
The football field at Drake Stadium is named in honor of Drake alumnus and football great Johnny Bright. The track is named after famed announcer Jim Duncan.

The installation of a $175,000 tartan track in 1969 replaced the cinder track. It was a magnificent 60th birthday present for Drake Relays competitors and fans. In 1976, all individual events at the Drake Relays went metric; in 1978, the conversion was completed with rebuilding of the track into a 400-meter oval so that relay races, too, could go metric. The Jim Duncan Track was resurfaced in the summer of 1989 in Drake blue school colors, featuring a combination of polyurethane coating and EPDM rubber granules. Since this installation, track and field athletes and fans frequently refer to the venue as the "Blue Oval".

The 2005–2006 renovation project improved many aspects of the stadium. The surface area of the stadium was flattened (previously the infield sat several feet lower than the track surface). It created a reconfigured track to meet NCAA and international standards, improved seating, and added a "safety lane" on the outside of the track for athletes (in the old configuration, fans could easily make contact with a competitor in lane 8). In addition, a new scoreboard with video screen was placed at the northeast corner of the stadium. Widening the track reduced the stadium's seating capacity from 18,000 to 14,557. As a result, throwing events were moved to an area north of the stadium.

The Bulldogs played their 2005 home games at Waukee High School's Warrior Stadium due to renovations at the stadium.

In the summer of 2016, the field and track were resurfaced. New turf was installed and the track surface was replaced using the same material used at the Beijing and London Summer Olympics.

== Notable events ==
Drake Stadium has hosted the NCAA Division I Outdoor Track and Field Championships on four occasions:

- 1970 (men's only)
- 2008 (men's and women's)
- 2011 (men's and women's)
- 2012 (men's and women's)

The 2008 championships doubled the previous four-day record crowd with a total attendance of 41,187 (including over 11,000 for the final day) despite heavy flooding in Des Moines.

Drake Stadium has also hosted the USA Outdoor Track and Field Championships four times:

- 2010
- 2013
- 2018
- 2019

Additionally, the facility has hosted the AAU Junior Olympic Games four times.

== Stadium records ==
=== Men ===
| Event | Record | Athlete | Nationality | Meet | Ref |
|---|---|---|---|---|---|
| 100 m | 9.88 | Noah Lyles | United States | 2018 USA Outdoor Championships | |
| 200 m | 19.78 | Noah Lyles | United States | 2019 USA Outdoor Championships | |
| 400 m | 43.64 | Fred Kerley | United States | 2019 USA Outdoor Championships | |
| 800 m | 1:43.27 | Duane Solomon | United States | 2013 USA Outdoor Championships | |
| 1500 m | 3:38.27 | Steve Scott | United States | 1984 Drake Relays | |
| Mile | 3:51.71 | Alan Webb | United States | 2007 Drake Relays | |
| 5000 m | 13:21.39 | Morgan McDonald | Australia | 2021 Drake Relays | |
| 10000 m | 27:30.06 | Lopez Lomong | United States | 2019 USA Outdoor Championships | |
| 110 m hurdles | 12.93 | David Oliver | United States | 2010 USA Outdoor Championships | |
| 400 m hurdles | 47.32 | Bershawn Jackson | United States | 2013 USA Outdoor Championships | |
| 3000 m steeplechase | 8:18.05 | Hillary Bor | United States | 2019 USA Outdoor Championships | |
| High jump | 2.40 m (7 ft 10 1/4 in) | Derek Drouin | Canada | 2014 Drake Relays | |
| Pole vault | 6.06 m (19 ft 10 1/2 in) AR | Sam Kendricks | United States | 2019 USA Outdoor Championships | |
| Long jump | 8.40 m (27 ft 6 1/2 in) | Ngonidzashe Makusha | Zimbabwe | 2011 NCAA Outdoor Championships | |
| Triple jump | 17.74 m (58 ft 2 1/4 in) | Donald Scott | United States | 2019 USA Outdoor Championships | |
| Shot put | 22.72 m (74 ft 6 1/4 in) | Ryan Crouser | United States | 2020 Blue Oval Showcase | |
| Discus throw | 68.61 m (225 ft 1 in) | Reggie Jagers | United States | 2018 USA Outdoor Championships | |
| Hammer throw | 81.08 m (266 ft 0 in) | Rudy Winkler | United States | 2025 Drake Relays | |
| Javelin throw | 83.50 m (273 ft 11 1/4 in) | Riley Dolezal | United States | 2013 USA Outdoor Championships | |
| Decathlon | 8295 pts | Devon Williams | United States | 2019 USA Outdoor Championships | |

=== Women ===
| Event | Record | Athlete | Nationality | Meet | Ref |
|---|---|---|---|---|---|
| 100 m | 10.85 | English Gardner; Barbara Pierre | United States; United States | 2013 USA Outdoor Championships | |
| 200 m | 22.19 | Kimberlyn Duncan | United States | 2012 NCAA Outdoor Championships | |
| 400 m | 49.52 | Shakima Wimbley | United States | 2018 USA Outdoor Championships | |
| 800 m | 1:57.72 | Ajeé Wilson | United States | 2019 USA Outdoor Championships | |
| 1500 m | 4:03.18 | Shelby Houlihan | United States | 2019 USA Outdoor Championships | |
| Mile | 4:23.69 | Krissy Gear | United States | 2025 Drake Relays | |
| 5000 m | 15:15.08 | Sally Kipyego | Kenya | 2012 NCAA Outdoor Championships | |
| 10000 m | 31:43.20 | Shalane Flanagan | United States | 2013 USA Outdoor Championships | |
| 100 m hurdles | 12.26 | Brianna Rollins | United States | 2013 USA Outdoor Championships | |
| 400 m hurdles | 52.20 WR | Dalilah Muhammad | United States | 2019 USA Outdoor Championships | |
| 3000 m steeplechase | 9:17.70 | Emma Coburn | United States | 2018 USA Outdoor Championships | |
| High jump | 2.05 m (6 ft 8 1/2 in) AR | Chaunté Lowe | United States | 2010 USA Outdoor Championships | |
| Pole vault | 4.89 m (16 ft 1/2 in) | Jenn Suhr | United States | 2010 USA Outdoor Championships | |
| Long jump | 7.00 m (22 ft 11 1/2 in) | Brittney Reese | United States | 2019 USA Outdoor Championships | |
| Triple jump | 14.59 m (47 ft 10 1/4 in) | Keturah Orji | United States | 2018 USA Outdoor Championships | |
| Shot put | 20.24 m (66 ft 4 3/4 in) | Michelle Carter | United States | 2013 USA Outdoor Championships | |
| Discus throw | 65.13 m (213 ft 8 in) | Gia Lewis-Smallwood | United States | 2013 USA Outdoor Championships | |
| Hammer throw | 78.24 m (256 ft 8 1/4 in) AR | DeAnna Price | United States | 2019 USA Outdoor Championships | |
| Javelin throw | 66.67 m (218 ft 8 3/4 in) AR | Kara Patterson | United States | 2010 USA Outdoor Championships | |
| Heptathlon | 6735 pts | Hyleas Fountain | United States | 2010 USA Outdoor Championships | |

== See also ==
- List of NCAA Division I FCS football stadiums
