= Nicole Bush =

American long-distance runner

Personal information
- Nationality: American
- Born: April 4, 1986 (age 40) Wyoming, Michigan, U.S.

Sport
- Sport: Track
- Event: 3000 metres steeplechase
- College team: Michigan State

Achievements and titles
- Personal best(s): 3000 SC: 9:24.59; 1500 meters: 4:13.83; 5000 metres: 15:31.43
Medal record
Women's athletics
Representing the United States
World Outdoor Championships
| 2013 Moscow | 3000 m SC |

Nicole Bush (born April 4, 1986) is an American long-distance runner who competes in the steeplechase. Her personal record for the event is 9:24.59 minutes. She was the 2013 American champion in the steeplechase.

She competed collegiately for the Michigan State Spartans and her best placing was second at the NCAA Outdoor Championship in 2009. She was also runner-up at the USA Outdoor Track and Field Championships in 2010.

== Career ==
=== Early life and college ===
Born in Wyoming, Michigan, Bush attended Kelloggsville High School and established herself as a distance runner with four state titles in the 3200 m, and three state titles in both the 1600 m and cross country running.

After graduating high school in 2004 she went to Michigan State University. In her sophomore year (2006), she proved herself as a steeplechaser by placing fifth at the NCAA Outdoor Championship and third at the Big Ten Conference meet. In 2007, she was runner-up at the Big Ten championship, sixth at the NCAA Women's Division I Outdoor Track and Field Championships and came fifth at the NCAA Cross Country Championships.

In the 2008 indoor season Bush came second in the 5000 meters and third in the 3000 meters at the Big Ten Indoor Championship, then placed fourth and sixth in those events at the NCAA Indoor Championship. She didn't compete collegiately outdoors that year but instead competed at the 2008 United States Olympic Trials. She ran a personal record for the steeplechase with 9:40.27 minutes but did not make the Olympic team as she placed fourth overall. She was the gold medalist at the 2008 NACAC Under-23 Championships in 10:42.17 contributing to the 62 US Medals in Toluca.

In her final year with Michigan State she came ninth at the 2008 NCAA Women's Division I Cross Country Championship. In May 2009 her run of 9:39.38 at the Payton Jordan Invitational raised her to fifth on the all-time collegiate lists. At the Big Ten Championships she won her first title with a meet record time of 9:41.87 minutes for the steeplechase. She also placed second in the 5000 m with a then personal record time of 15:55.41 minutes. In her last competition for her school she was the steeplechase runner-up at the 2009 NCAA Women's Division I Outdoor Track and Field Championships.

Bush also competed at the national championships indoors and out in 2009. At the USA Indoor Track and Field Championships she placed seventh in the 3000 m. At the 2009 USA Outdoor Track and Field Championships an official left one of the barriers at an incorrect height, leading Bush to fracture the cuboid bone in her right foot. This ended any possibility of making the team for the 2009 World Championships in Athletics.

=== Professional ===
After recovering from her foot injury, she returned to competition as a New Balance professional athlete in mid-2010. She ran personal records for the mile run (4:36.27) and 3000 m (9:15.71). Bush was runner-up at the 2010 USA Outdoor Track and Field Championships in 9:56.08 behind Lisa Aguilera. Her best steeplechase run that season (9:40.49) came in Belgium.

Her times were nearer ten minutes in the 2011 season and she placed tenth at the 2011 USA Outdoor Track and Field Championships.

Bush placed 21st at the 2012 United States Olympic Trials and having a best of 10:03.92 minutes that year.

Bush returned to the form not seen since her college years in 2013. At the Ponce Grand Prix she ran a personal record of 9:39.36 minutes then claimed the national title at the 2013 USA Outdoor Track and Field Championships. This meant she had achieved the "A" standard and would be selected for the 2013 World Championships in Athletics to compete in the steeplechase placing 25th in 9:58.03.

Bush ran 9:24.59 in Belgium at Heusden-Zolder in July 2014. Bush placed 8th at 2014 USA Outdoor Track and Field Championships in 9:48.08.

Bush ran 9:44.68 in New York at New York Diamond League in June 2015. Bush placed 11th at 2015 USA Outdoor Track and Field Championships in 9:54.51.

Bush ran in 2016 Great Edinburgh International Cross Country helping Team USA to finish 5th. Bush ran 9:39.84 in Portland at Lewis & Clark College in June 2016. Bush placed 13th at 2016 United States Olympic Trials (track and field) in 9:58.04.

== Personal bests ==
- 3000 meters steeplechase – 9:24.59 min (2014)
- 1500 meters – 4:13.83 min (2014)
- One mile – 4:36.27 min (2010)
- 3000 meters (indoor) – 9:04.35 min (2009)
- 5000 meters – 15:31.41 min (2014)
