= Alice Schmidt =

American middle-distance runner (born 1981)

Alice Schmidt Kehaya (born October 3, 1981) is an American middle-distance runner who specializes in the 800 meters. She represented the United States at the 2008 Summer Olympics and 2012 London Olympics and has competed at the World Championships in Athletics on three occasions (2005, 2007, 2011).

Schmidt emerged as one of the top collegiate runners while at the University of North Carolina, winning back-to-back NCAA outdoor titles in 2002 and 2003. She won the United States Indoor title in 2006 and has placed in the top three nationally at the USA Outdoor Track and Field Championships six times. Her personal best for the 800 m is 1:58.61 minutes, set in 2011. Her personal best in the 1500m is 4:05.64, set in 2012.

== Early life and college ==
Born in Omaha, Nebraska, she attended Elkhorn High School then went on to study journalism and political science at the University of North Carolina. She ran in collegiate competition for the North Carolina Tar Heels and in her first year she was runner-up in the 800 m at the NCAA Indoor Championship and the NCAA Outdoor Championship. She was also Atlantic Coast Conference indoors and outdoors that year. She defended her regional titles in 2002, placed third at the NCAA Indoors, then claimed her first NCAA Outdoor title with a personal record run of 2:04.74 minutes.

In her third year at North Carolina she won a second straight NCAA Outdoor title, improving her best to 2:01.16 minutes in the process. She also won the ACC Indoor title and placed top three in both the 800 m and 1500 meters at the ACC Outdoors. In her final year, she did not top the podium at the major collegiate competitions, coming runner-up at the ACC Indoor and Outdoor meets, fifth at the NCAA Indoor Championship, and third over 800 m at the NCAA Outdoor Championship.

== Professional career ==
Schmidt turned professional in 2005 and performed well on the circuit. She was runner-up at the Boston Indoor Games and Millrose Games. She dipped under two minutes at an Italian meeting in Lignano Sabbiadoro, running 1:59.29 minutes, then placed third in the 800 m at the USA Outdoor Track and Field Championships. This led to her first appearance on the global stage at the 2005 World Championships in Athletics, where she was a semi-finalist. Her fastest run of 2006 (1:59.35) ranked her second in the United States that year. She claimed her first national title at the USA Indoor Track and Field Championships and was second behind Hazel Clark at the USA Outdoors. Third place at the 2007 USA Outdoors saw her included in the American team for the 2007 World Championships in Athletics. She was knocked out in the heats, but her season was highlighted by a lifetime best of 1:58.75 minutes at the Prefontaine Classic.

Schmidt finished second to Clark at the United States Olympic Trials and made her Olympic debut at the 2008 Beijing Olympics. She did not progress beyond the heats. A stress fracture injury curtailed her 2009 and 2010 seasons. She returned to peak form in 2011, having a season's best of 1:58.61 minutes in Italy. A third-place finish in 1:59.21 minutes at the 2011 USA Outdoor Track and Field Championships saw her compete at the World Championships for a third time. She reached the semi-finals at the Daegu World Championships.

A personal best of 4:05.64 minutes came en route to her win in the 1500 m at the 2012 Prefontaine Classic, where she beat world champion Jennifer Simpson. She ran in the 800 m at the 2012 United States Olympic Trials and earned her second Olympic selection by beating Molly Beckwith to the third place spot. She reached the semi-final stage at the Olympics.

Schmidt retired from her career as a professional athlete to pursue a career in medicine. She completed the University of Virginia's Post-Baccalaureate Pre-Medical Program in May, 2014 and is currently enrolled in George Washington University Medical School

== Personal bests ==
- 800 meters: 1:58.61 min (2011)
- 1500 meters: 4:05.64 min (2012)
- 800 m indoors: 2:01.93 min (2006)
