= Erin Donohue =

American middle-distance runner

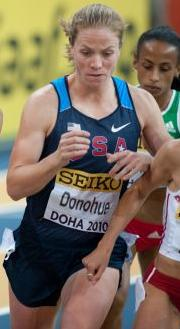
- Erin Donohue, 2010 IAAF World Indoor Championships

Personal information
- Full name: Erin Leigh Donohue
- Born: May 8, 1983 (age 43) Philadelphia, Pennsylvania, U.S.
- Education: Haddonfield Memorial High School and University of North Carolina
- Height: 5 ft 8 in (173 cm)
- Weight: 146 lb (66 kg)

Sport
- Sport: Track and field
- Coached by: Assistant coach with the Philadelphia University Cross Country program

Achievements and titles
- National finals: Silver medalist at the 2010 USA Outdoor Track and Field Championships

Erin Leigh Donohue (born May 8, 1983) is an American athlete who competes in middle-distance track events. Donohue qualified for the U.S. Olympic team at the 2008 Summer Olympics in the 1500 meters.

== Early life ==
Born in Philadelphia, Pennsylvania, Donohue competed for Haddonfield Memorial High School in Haddonfield, New Jersey and the University of North Carolina in both middle-distance running events and the javelin throw.

== Career ==
At the 2010 IAAF World Indoor Championships in Doha, she was sixth in the 1500 m final, running a season's best 4:09. She was the silver medalist at the 2010 USA Outdoor Track and Field Championships behind Anna Pierce. Donohue took part in the Fifth Avenue Mile road race in September and finished in third place behind her compatriots Shannon Rowbury and Sara Hall.

She is an assistant coach with the Philadelphia University Cross Country program.
