= Sarah Brown (athlete) =

American middle-distance runner

Personal information
- Native name: Sarah Brown
- Nationality: American
- Born: Sarah Bowman Warrenton, VA
- Education: University of Tennessee

Sport
- Country: United States
- Sport: Distance Running
- Position: Middle Distance Runner
- University team: University of Tennessee

Achievements and titles
- National finals: 9-time NCAA All-American for the University of Tennessee, 2014 Harry Jerome Mile, 2013 Medtronic TC 1 Mile crown
Medal record
Women's athletics
Representing the United States
- Updated on 1 May 2015

Sarah Brown (née Bowman - born October 15, 1986) is a professional American middle distance runner.

== High school career ==
Brown attended Fauquier High School in Warrenton, Virginia. She held the high school record in the mile. Sarah Bowman's 4:36.95 earned a gold medal in the mile 2005 Nike Outdoor Nationals with a time ahead of Brianna Felnagle 4:39.71.

== College career ==
Brown was a nine time All-American and four time NCAA champion for the University of Tennessee.

== International career ==
At the 2010 World Indoor Championships in Athletics Sarah placed 8th in the 1500 meters. At the 2013 World Championships in Athletics she was a semi-finalist in the 1500 meters.

At the 2015 New Balance Indoor Grand Prix Brown helped set an indoor world record in the distance medley relay.

== Sponsorship ==
Brown runs for Team New Balance.
