= Brianna Felnagle =

American middle-distance runner

Personal information
- Nickname: Brie Felnagle
- Nationality: American
- Born: December 9, 1986 (age 39) Tacoma, Washington
- Height: 5 ft 7 in (1.70 m)

Sport
- Sport: Middle-distance running
- Event: 1500 metres 5000 metres
- Club: Adidas Running
- Team: University of North Carolina Tar Heels
- Turned pro: 2010
- Coached by: Danny Mackey, Brooks Beast distance coach

Achievements and titles
- Personal best(s): 1500 m: 4:05.64 mile: 4:29.84; 3000 m: 8:51.38; 2 Miles: 9:47.73 i 5000 m: 15:14.33
Medal record
Women's athletics
Representing the United States

Brianna Felnagle (born December 9, 1986) is an American middle-distance runner.

== Prep ==
Born in Tacoma, Washington, Felnagle won two Washington Interscholastic Activities Association state cross country and six track and field titles. Felnagle earned a silver medal in the mile 2005 Nike Outdoor Nationals with a time of 4:39.71 behind Sarah Bowman's 4:36.95.

Felnagle was a 2004 Foot Locker Cross Country Championships All-American placing 6th in 18:02.

As a Junior, Felnagle was named 2004 Gatorade Player of the Year awards Track and Field.

== College ==
Felnagle ran at the University of North Carolina at Chapel Hill where she was an indoor national champion in the distance medley relay, outdoor national champion in the 1500 meters, and was a cross country All-American. Felnagle earned her 12th All-America honor in 2009 NCAA Division I Indoor Championships.

Year	ACC 12 xc	NCAA xc	ACC indoor	NCAA indoor	ACC Outdoor	NCAA Outdoor
2005-06	All-ACC, All-Region	20:38.60 (45th)	mile (1st); 800 (2nd)	DMR (1st)	All-ACC 800	
2006-07	All-ACC, All-Region	(22nd)	800(1st) mile (2nd)		800 (1st); 1500 (1st)	1500 (1st)
2007-08	All-ACC, All-Region	(11th)	800 (2nd) mile (3rd)	3,000 (2nd)	1,500 (1st); 5,000 (1st)	1,500 (9th)
2008-09	All-ACC, All-Region	(4th)	3000 (1st)	3000 (5th); DMR (2nd)		
2009-10					1,500 (4th); 5,000 (2nd)	5,000 (14th)

== Professional ==
In 2008, Felnagle competed at the 2008 United States Olympic Trials (track and field) in the 1,500.

In 2011, Felnagle was the winner at the USATF National Club Cross Country Championships. At 2011 USA Outdoor Track and Field Championships, she placed 7th in 4:10.33.

In 2012, Felnagle competed at the 2012 United States Olympic Trials (track and field) in the 5,000.

In 2013, Felnagle placed 7th in 15:46.05 at the 2013 USA Outdoor Track and Field Championships.

Felnagle finished 3rd in the 2 mile race at the 2015 USA Indoor Track and Field Championships.

Felnagle competed at the 2015 IAAF World Cross Country Championships where she finished 45th after placing 4th at the 2015 Boulder USA Cross Country Championships.
