= Colorado Buffaloes track and field =

College track and field team

- University: University of Colorado Boulder
- Head coach: Sean Carlson
- Conference: Big 12
- Location: Boulder, Colorado
- Outdoor track: Potts Field
- Nickname: Buffaloes
- Colors: Silver, black, and gold

The Colorado Buffaloes track and field team is the track and field program that represents University of Colorado Boulder. The Buffaloes compete in NCAA Division I as a member of the Big 12 Conference. The team is based in Boulder, Colorado, at the Potts Field.

The program is coached by Sean Carlson. The track and field program officially encompasses four teams because the NCAA considers men's and women's indoor track and field and outdoor track and field as separate sports.

Jenny Barringer is the only athlete on the team to have won a Bowerman Award, with four individual NCAA titles in middle-distance running. The team was coached by Mark Wetmore and his partner Heather Burroughs until his contract was not renewed in 2024.

A 2023 investigation showed that the Colorado track and field program used body composition analysis that harmed a significant number of athletes by exacerbating eating disorders. As part of the team practice, calipers were used to measure adipose tissue on seven different body parts. The practice was found to have negatively impacted women's team members more than men's athletes.

== Postseason ==
=== AIAW ===
The Buffaloes have had nine AIAW individual All-Americans finishing in the top six at the AIAW indoor or outdoor championships.

AIAW All-Americans
Championships	Name	Event	Place
1973 Outdoor	Heidi Davidson	200 meters hurdles	5th
1973 Outdoor	Jane Frederick	Pentathlon	1st
1975 Outdoor	Mitzi McMillin	Pentathlon	1st
1975 Outdoor	Lori West	Pentathlon	4th
1976 Outdoor	Lori West	Pentathlon	3rd
1978 Indoor	Lee Ballenger	600 yards	1st
1978 Indoor	Dana Slater	2 miles	1st
1978 Outdoor	Lee Ballenger	800 meters	2nd
1979 Indoor	Dana Slater	3 miles	1st
1979 Indoor	Unknown	4 × 440 yards relay	4th
1979 Indoor	Unknown	4 × 440 yards relay	4th
1979 Indoor	Unknown	4 × 440 yards relay	4th
1979 Indoor	Unknown	4 × 440 yards relay	4th
1979 Indoor	Unknown	Distance medley relay	2nd
1979 Indoor	Unknown	Distance medley relay	2nd
1979 Indoor	Unknown	Distance medley relay	2nd
1979 Indoor	Unknown	Distance medley relay	2nd
1980 Indoor	Unknown	Distance medley relay	6th
1980 Indoor	Unknown	Distance medley relay	6th
1980 Indoor	Unknown	Distance medley relay	6th
1980 Indoor	Unknown	Distance medley relay	6th
1980 Outdoor	Lee Ballenger	800 meters	3rd
1980 Outdoor	Brenda Chambers	400 meters hurdles	3rd
1981 Indoor	Carleen Thon	1500 meters	6th
1982 Indoor	Annette Tannander	Long jump	4th

=== NCAA ===
As of August 2025, a total of 83 men and 51 women have achieved individual first-team All-American status for the team at the Division I men's outdoor, women's outdoor, men's indoor, or women's indoor national championships (using the modern criteria of top-8 placing regardless of athlete nationality).

First team NCAA All-Americans
Team	Championships	Name	Event	Place	Ref.
Men's	1930 Outdoor	Darrell Hamilton	Long jump	4th	
Men's	1933 Outdoor	Meredith Jameson	High jump	3rd	
Men's	1935 Outdoor	Claude Walton	Discus throw	2nd	
Men's	1936 Outdoor	Dick Kearns	220 yards hurdles	5th	
Men's	1936 Outdoor	Dick Kearns	110 meters hurdles	5th	
Men's	1936 Outdoor	Gil Cruter	High jump	4th	
Men's	1937 Outdoor	Gil Cruter	High jump	1st	
Men's	1938 Outdoor	Dick Kearnes	110 meters hurdles	2nd	
Men's	1938 Outdoor	Gil Cruter	High jump	1st	
Men's	1941 Outdoor	Gordon Learned	100 meters	7th	
Men's	1941 Outdoor	Gordon Learned	220 yards hurdles	3rd	
Men's	1942 Outdoor	Robert Dey	200 meters	7th	
Men's	1943 Outdoor	Ernest Lewis	Discus throw	5th	
Men's	1944 Outdoor	Stu Norene	800 meters	5th	
Men's	1944 Outdoor	Guy Walk	Javelin throw	2nd	
Men's	1946 Outdoor	Harold McAferty	High jump	5th	
Men's	1946 Outdoor	Ray Jenkins	Discus throw	5th	
Men's	1947 Outdoor	Dave Bolen	400 meters	2nd	
Men's	1948 Outdoor	Don Campbell	100 meters	3rd	
Men's	1948 Outdoor	Don Campbell	200 meters	5th	
Men's	1948 Outdoor	Warren Bateman	Pole vault	1st	
Men's	1949 Outdoor	Don Campbell	100 meters	7th	
Men's	1949 Outdoor	Don Campbell	200 meters	7th	
Men's	1949 Outdoor	Jack Todd	Javelin throw	6th	
Men's	1951 Outdoor	George Holley	Javelin throw	7th	
Men's	1955 Outdoor	Stew Walker	Pole vault	8th	
Men's	1956 Outdoor	Ken Yob	Javelin throw	7th	
Men's	1957 Outdoor	Ken Yob	Javelin throw	2nd	
Men's	1958 Outdoor	Chuck Carlson	400 meters	8th	
Men's	1959 Outdoor	Chuck Carlson	400 meters	2nd	
Men's	1959 Outdoor	Mike Peake	800 meters	8th	
Men's	1960 Outdoor	Ted Woods	400 meters	1st	
Men's	1960 Outdoor	Don Meyers	Long jump	5th	
Men's	1961 Outdoor	Jim Heath	400 meters	7th	
Men's	1961 Outdoor	Bill Toomey	400 meters hurdles	7th	
Men's	1961 Outdoor	Don Meyers	Long jump	1st	
Men's	1962 Outdoor	Jim Heath	400 meters	5th	
Men's	1962 Outdoor	Don Meyers	Pole vault	1st	
Men's	1963 Outdoor	Dick Burns	200 meters	5th	
Men's	1963 Outdoor	Jim Miller	400 meters hurdles	4th	
Men's	1963 Outdoor	Bob Griffith	Mile run	6th	
Men's	1963 Outdoor	Leander Durley	High jump	5th	
Men's	1964 Outdoor	Mel Cheskin	4 × 100 meters relay	4th	
Men's	1964 Outdoor	Charles Morton	4 × 100 meters relay	4th	
Men's	1964 Outdoor	Dick Burns	4 × 100 meters relay	4th	
Men's	1964 Outdoor	Jim Miller	4 × 100 meters relay	4th	
Men's	1965 Outdoor	Jim Miller	110 meters hurdles	8th	
Men's	1965 Outdoor	Jim Miller	200 meters	3rd	
Men's	1965 Outdoor	Lynn Baker	Triple jump	7th	
Men's	1966 Outdoor	Chuck Rogers	Pole vault	1st	
Men's	1967 Outdoor	Chuck Rogers	Pole vault	7th	
Men's	1969 Indoor	Craig Runyan	3000 meters	4th	
Men's	1970 Outdoor	Marcus Walker	110 meters hurdles	2nd	
Men's	1970 Outdoor	Mike Wedman	Decathlon	3rd	
Men's	1971 Indoor	George Daniels	55 meters	4th	
Men's	1971 Indoor	Marcus Walker	55 meters hurdles	1st	
Men's	1971 Indoor	Cliff Branch	400 meters	3rd	
Men's	1971 Indoor	George Daniels	400 meters	5th	
Men's	1971 Outdoor	George Daniels	100 meters	6th	
Men's	1971 Outdoor	George Daniels	200 meters	2nd	
Men's	1971 Outdoor	Cliff Branch	200 meters	7th	
Men's	1971 Outdoor	Dave Bussabarger	Pole vault	8th	
Men's	1972 Indoor	George Daniels	400 meters	3rd	
Men's	1972 Outdoor	Cliff Branch	100 meters	5th	
Men's	1973 Indoor	Mike Peterson	Distance medley relay	2nd	
Men's	1973 Indoor	Brown Windle	Distance medley relay	2nd	
Men's	1973 Indoor	Ted Casteneda	Distance medley relay	2nd	
Men's	1973 Indoor	John Gregorio	Distance medley relay	2nd	
Men's	1973 Indoor	Kingsley Adams	Long jump	4th	
Men's	1973 Outdoor	Ted Castaneda	5000 meters	2nd	
Men's	1973 Outdoor	John Gregorio	5000 meters	3rd	
Men's	1974 Indoor	Ohene Karikari	55 meters	2nd	
Men's	1974 Indoor	Ted Castaneda	3000 meters	2nd	
Men's	1974 Indoor	Mike Peterson	Distance medley relay	4th	
Men's	1974 Indoor	Rick Musgrave	Distance medley relay	4th	
Men's	1974 Indoor	Ted Casteneda	Distance medley relay	4th	
Men's	1974 Indoor	Tony Krzyzosiak	Distance medley relay	4th	
Men's	1974 Indoor	Bill Jankunis	High jump	4th	
Men's	1974 Indoor	Kingsley Adams	Long jump	1st	
Men's	1974 Outdoor	Mike Peterson	5000 meters	5th	
Men's	1974 Outdoor	Ted Castaneda	10,000 meters	2nd	
Men's	1974 Outdoor	Bill Jankunis	High jump	5th	
Men's	1974 Outdoor	Mike Hill	Decathlon	4th	
Men's	1975 Indoor	Kingsley Adams	Long jump	3rd	
Men's	1975 Outdoor	Kingsley Adams	Long jump	7th	
Men's	1976 Indoor	Rich Musgrave	1000 meters	5th	
Men's	1976 Outdoor	Rick Musgrave	1500 meters	6th	
Men's	1977 Outdoor	Art Burns	Discus throw	5th	
Men's	1980 Indoor	Richard Harris	Mile run	3rd	
Men's	1980 Outdoor	Mark Andersen	10,000 meters	5th	
Women's	1982 Outdoor	Annette Tannander	Heptathlon	2nd	
Men's	1983 Indoor	Mark Scrutton	3000 meters	1st	
Women's	1983 Outdoor	Annette Tannander	Heptathlon	4th	
Women's	1987 Indoor	Donna Waller	55 meters hurdles	5th	
Women's	1987 Outdoor	Donna Waller	100 meters hurdles	4th	
Men's	1988 Indoor	Kyle Hargett	400 meters	4th	
Men's	1989 Outdoor	Kyle Hargett	400 meters	8th	
Men's	1990 Indoor	Mike Macinko	800 meters	4th	
Women's	1990 Indoor	Yolanda Johnson	55 meters hurdles	2nd	
Women's	1990 Indoor	Karol Damon	High jump	5th	
Women's	1990 Outdoor	Yolanda Johnson	100 meters hurdles	5th	
Women's	1991 Indoor	Karol Damon	High jump	3rd	
Women's	1991 Outdoor	Yolanda Johnson	100 meters hurdles	6th	
Women's	1991 Outdoor	Karol Damon	High jump	3rd	
Men's	1992 Indoor	Chris Volgenau	Shot put	6th	
Women's	1993 Indoor	Melisa Weis	Shot put	4th	
Men's	1993 Outdoor	Maurice Mitchell	400 meters hurdles	3rd	
Women's	1993 Outdoor	Melisa Weis	Shot put	3rd	
Men's	1994 Indoor	Sean Found	5000 meters	2nd	
Men's	1994 Indoor	Jason Drake	Distance medley relay	8th	
Men's	1994 Indoor	Bryant Amador	Distance medley relay	8th	
Men's	1994 Indoor	Brett Larsen	Distance medley relay	8th	
Men's	1994 Indoor	Shawn Found	Distance medley relay	8th	
Women's	1994 Indoor	Melisa Weis	Shot put	6th	
Women's	1994 Outdoor	Melisa Weis	Shot put	6th	
Women's	1994 Outdoor	Melisa Weis	Discus throw	3rd	
Men's	1995 Indoor	Alan Culpepper	3000 meters	5th	
Men's	1995 Indoor	Adam Goucher	5000 meters	3rd	
Women's	1995 Indoor	Kelly Smith	Mile run	8th	
Women's	1995 Indoor	Muffy Raveling	3000 meters	4th	
Women's	1995 Indoor	Patty Roberts	5000 meters	6th	
Women's	1995 Indoor	Amy McNitt	5000 meters	8th	
Men's	1995 Outdoor	Clint Wells	3000 meters steeplechase	7th	
Men's	1995 Outdoor	Adam Goucher	5000 meters	6th	
Men's	1995 Outdoor	Matt Lepsis	Discus throw	7th	
Women's	1995 Outdoor	Kelly Smith	1500 meters	3rd	
Women's	1995 Outdoor	Muffy Raveling	3000 meters	4th	
Women's	1995 Outdoor	Patty Roberts	10,000 meters	3rd	
Women's	1996 Indoor	Natalie Raveling	3000 meters	3rd	
Women's	1996 Indoor	Shayne Willie	3000 meters	8th	
Men's	1996 Outdoor	Clint Wells	3000 meters steeplechase	5th	
Men's	1996 Outdoor	Alan Culpepper	5000 meters	1st	
Men's	1996 Outdoor	Adam Goucher	5000 meters	4th	
Women's	1996 Outdoor	Yvonne Wade	100 meters hurdles	5th	
Women's	1996 Outdoor	Kelly Smith	1500 meters	2nd	
Women's	1996 Outdoor	Tasha Ward	4 × 400 meters relay	7th	
Women's	1996 Outdoor	Tamara Ards	4 × 400 meters relay	7th	
Women's	1996 Outdoor	Heather Sterlin	4 × 400 meters relay	7th	
Women's	1996 Outdoor	Leona Russell	4 × 400 meters relay	7th	
Women's	1996 Outdoor	Heather Sterlin	Heptathlon	3rd	
Men's	1997 Indoor	Tom Reese	Mile run	8th	
Men's	1997 Indoor	Adam Goucher	3000 meters	1st	
Women's	1997 Indoor	Amanda Farquhar	55 meters hurdles	8th	
Women's	1997 Indoor	Shayne Willie	3000 meters	7th	
Men's	1997 Outdoor	Adam Goucher	5000 meters	3rd	
Women's	1997 Outdoor	Kelly Smith	1500 meters	2nd	
Women's	1997 Outdoor	Shayne Wille	3000 meters	3rd	
Women's	1997 Outdoor	Heather Sterlin	Heptathlon	6th	
Men's	1998 Indoor	Adam Goucher	3000 meters	1st	
Women's	1998 Indoor	Jennifer Smith	Mile run	5th	
Women's	1998 Indoor	Jen Gruia	5000 meters	5th	
Women's	1998 Indoor	Heather Burroughs	5000 meters	8th	
Men's	1998 Outdoor	Adam Batliner	3000 meters steeplechase	3rd	
Men's	1998 Outdoor	Adam Goucher	5000 meters	1st	
Women's	1998 Outdoor	Kelly Smith	1500 meters	2nd	
Women's	1998 Outdoor	Jennifer Smith	3000 meters	8th	
Women's	1998 Outdoor	Janet Visosky	Hammer throw	7th	
Men's	1999 Indoor	Jason Horton	4 × 400 meters relay	7th	
Men's	1999 Indoor	Ben Kelly	4 × 400 meters relay	7th	
Men's	1999 Indoor	Matt Queen	4 × 400 meters relay	7th	
Men's	1999 Indoor	James Davis	4 × 400 meters relay	7th	
Women's	1999 Indoor	Carrie Messner	Mile run	4th	
Women's	1999 Indoor	Kara Wheeler	3000 meters	7th	
Men's	1999 Outdoor	Adam Batliner	3000 meters steeplechase	3rd	
Men's	1999 Outdoor	Tom Reese	3000 meters steeplechase	4th	
Women's	1999 Outdoor	Kara Wheeler	3000 meters	2nd	
Men's	2000 Indoor	Jorge Torres	5000 meters	7th	
Men's	2000 Outdoor	Steve Slattery	3000 meters steeplechase	7th	
Men's	2000 Outdoor	Jorge Torres	5000 meters	8th	
Women's	2000 Outdoor	Kara Wheeler	3000 meters	1st	
Women's	2000 Outdoor	Lesley Higgins	3000 meters	8th	
Women's	2000 Outdoor	Kara Wheeler	5000 meters	1st	
Women's	2000 Outdoor	Jen Gruia	10,000 meters	4th	
Women's	2001 Indoor	Hannah Cooper	60 meters hurdles	8th	
Women's	2001 Indoor	Lesley Higgins	Mile run	2nd	
Women's	2001 Indoor	Sara Gorton	3000 meters	6th	
Women's	2001 Indoor	Jodie Hughes	5000 meters	1st	
Men's	2001 Outdoor	Steve Slattery	3000 meters steeplechase	3rd	
Men's	2001 Outdoor	Jorge Torres	5000 meters	5th	
Women's	2001 Outdoor	Kara Wheeler	5000 meters	7th	
Women's	2001 Outdoor	Molly Austin	10,000 meters	5th	
Women's	2001 Outdoor	Jodie Hughes	10,000 meters	8th	
Men's	2002 Indoor	Jorge Torres	5000 meters	2nd	
Men's	2002 Indoor	Dathan Ritzenhein	5000 meters	3rd	
Women's	2002 Indoor	Hannah Cooper	60 meters hurdles	8th	
Women's	2002 Indoor	Sara Gorton	Mile run	6th	
Women's	2002 Indoor	Jodie Hughes	5000 meters	3rd	
Women's	2002 Indoor	Molly Austin	5000 meters	5th	
Men's	2002 Outdoor	Reggie Depass	400 meters hurdles	8th	
Men's	2002 Outdoor	Steve Slattery	3000 meters steeplechase	2nd	
Men's	2002 Outdoor	Jorge Torres	5000 meters	2nd	
Men's	2002 Outdoor	Dathan Ritzenhein	5000 meters	4th	
Men's	2002 Outdoor	Steve Slattery	5000 meters	8th	
Women's	2002 Outdoor	Hannah Cooper	100 meters hurdles	7th	
Women's	2002 Outdoor	Sara Gorton	5000 meters	4th	
Women's	2002 Outdoor	Jodie Hughes	10,000 meters	4th	
Women's	2002 Outdoor	Molly Austin	10,000 meters	6th	
Women's	2003 Indoor	Sara Gorton	3000 meters	3rd	
Women's	2003 Indoor	Sara Gorton	5000 meters	1st	
Men's	2003 Outdoor	Billy Nelson	5000 meters	7th	
Men's	2003 Outdoor	Eric Logsdon	5000 meters	8th	
Women's	2003 Outdoor	Sara Gorton	5000 meters	3rd	
Men's	2004 Indoor	Bret Schoolmeester	3000 meters	7th	
Men's	2004 Indoor	Dathan Ritzenhein	5000 meters	4th	
Women's	2004 Indoor	Renee Metivier	3000 meters	6th	
Men's	2004 Outdoor	Dathan Ritzenhein	5000 meters	2nd	
Men's	2004 Outdoor	Steve Sundell	5000 meters	8th	
Women's	2004 Outdoor	Renee Metivier	5000 meters	6th	
Men's	2005 Indoor	Brent Vaughn	5000 meters	8th	
Women's	2005 Indoor	Renee Metivier	3000 meters	1st	
Women's	2005 Indoor	Renee Metivier	5000 meters	6th	
Men's	2005 Outdoor	Brent Vaughn	5000 meters	4th	
Men's	2005 Outdoor	Bret Schoolmeester	10,000 meters	5th	
Women's	2005 Outdoor	Renee Metivier	5000 meters	4th	
Women's	2005 Outdoor	Sara Gorton	10,000 meters	1st	
Women's	2005 Outdoor	Christine Bolf	10,000 meters	5th	
Men's	2006 Indoor	Stephen Pifer	Mile run	5th	
Men's	2006 Indoor	Bret Schoolmeester	5000 meters	6th	
Women's	2006 Indoor	Liza Pasciuto	3000 meters	7th	
Women's	2006 Outdoor	Jenny Barringer	3000 meters steeplechase	1st	
Men's	2007 Indoor	Stephen Pifer	Mile run	3rd	
Men's	2007 Outdoor	Billy Nelson	3000 meters steeplechase	4th	
Men's	2007 Outdoor	Jeremy Dodson	4 × 100 meters relay	6th	
Men's	2007 Outdoor	George Pincock	4 × 100 meters relay	6th	
Men's	2007 Outdoor	Chris Abuan	4 × 100 meters relay	6th	
Men's	2007 Outdoor	Ryan Campbell	4 × 100 meters relay	6th	
Women's	2007 Outdoor	Jenny Barringer	3000 meters steeplechase	7th	
Men's	2008 Outdoor	Billy Nelson	3000 meters steeplechase	2nd	
Men's	2008 Outdoor	Stephen Pifer	5000 meters	2nd	
Men's	2008 Outdoor	Brent Vaughn	5000 meters	3rd	
Men's	2008 Outdoor	Kenyon Neuman	5000 meters	7th	
Women's	2008 Outdoor	Jenny Barringer	3000 meters steeplechase	1st	
Women's	2009 Indoor	Jenny Barringer	3000 meters	1st	
Women's	2009 Outdoor	Jenny Barringer	3000 meters steeplechase	1st	
Men's	2010 Outdoor	Jeremy Dodson	200 meters	5th	
Men's	2010 Outdoor	Joe Bosshard	10,000 meters	6th	
Women's	2010 Outdoor	Emma Coburn	3000 meters steeplechase	2nd	
Women's	2010 Outdoor	Shalaya Kipp	3000 meters steeplechase	5th	
Women's	2011 Indoor	Emma Coburn	Mile run	8th	
Men's	2011 Outdoor	Joe Bosshard	10,000 meters	8th	
Women's	2011 Outdoor	Emma Coburn	3000 meters steeplechase	1st	
Women's	2011 Outdoor	Shalaya Kipp	3000 meters steeplechase	3rd	
Women's	2012 Outdoor	Shalaya Kipp	3000 meters steeplechase	1st	
Women's	2012 Outdoor	Jessica Tebo	5000 meters	3rd	
Women's	2013 Indoor	Emma Coburn	Mile run	1st	
Men's	2013 Outdoor	Aric van Halen	3000 meters steeplechase	8th	
Women's	2013 Outdoor	Emma Coburn	3000 meters steeplechase	1st	
Men's	2014 Indoor	Ben Saarel	3000 meters	3rd	
Women's	2014 Indoor	Shalaya Kipp	5000 meters	7th	
Men's	2014 Outdoor	Joe Bosshard	10,000 meters	7th	
Women's	2014 Outdoor	Shalaya Kipp	3000 meters steeplechase	5th	
Women's	2014 Outdoor	Emily Hunsucker	Hammer throw	2nd	
Men's	2015 Indoor	Morgan Pearson	3000 meters	5th	
Men's	2015 Indoor	Pierce Murphy	5000 meters	6th	
Men's	2015 Outdoor	Pierce Murphy	10,000 meters	5th	
Women's	2015 Outdoor	Sara Sutherland	1500 meters	3rd	
Men's	2016 Indoor	Pierce Murphy	3000 meters	5th	
Men's	2016 Indoor	Pierce Murphy	5000 meters	3rd	
Men's	2016 Indoor	Morgan Pearson	5000 meters	6th	
Women's	2016 Indoor	Erin Clark	3000 meters	5th	
Women's	2016 Indoor	Kaitlyn Benner	3000 meters	8th	
Men's	2016 Outdoor	Pierce Murphy	10,000 meters	4th	
Men's	2017 Indoor	Ben Saarel	Mile run	8th	
Men's	2017 Indoor	Joe Klecker	3000 meters	4th	
Men's	2017 Indoor	John Dressel	3000 meters	8th	
Men's	2017 Indoor	John Dressel	5000 meters	4th	
Women's	2017 Indoor	Dani Jones	3000 meters	1st	
Women's	2017 Indoor	Erin Clark	3000 meters	8th	
Women's	2017 Indoor	Tabor Scholl	Distance medley relay	1st	
Women's	2017 Indoor	Elissa Mann	Distance medley relay	1st	
Women's	2017 Indoor	Sage Hurta	Distance medley relay	1st	
Women's	2017 Indoor	Dani Jones	Distance medley relay	1st	
Men's	2017 Outdoor	Ben Saarel	1500 meters	8th	
Men's	2017 Outdoor	Joe Klecker	5000 meters	7th	
Men's	2017 Outdoor	John Dressel	5000 meters	8th	
Women's	2017 Outdoor	Dani Jones	1500 meters	5th	
Women's	2017 Outdoor	Maddie Boreman	3000 meters steeplechase	2nd	
Women's	2017 Outdoor	Erin Clark	10,000 meters	5th	
Women's	2018 Indoor	Dani Jones	Mile run	2nd	
Women's	2018 Indoor	Erin Clark	5000 meters	6th	
Women's	2018 Outdoor	Val Constien	3000 meters steeplechase	5th	
Women's	2018 Outdoor	Kaitlyn Benner	10,000 meters	7th	
Men's	2019 Indoor	Joe Klecker	3000 meters	3rd	
Men's	2019 Indoor	Joe Klecker	5000 meters	2nd	
Women's	2019 Indoor	Gabby Scott	400 meters	7th	
Women's	2019 Indoor	Makena Morley	3000 meters	6th	
Women's	2019 Indoor	Makena Morley	5000 meters	7th	
Women's	2019 Outdoor	Gabby Scott	400 meters hurdles	2nd	
Women's	2019 Outdoor	Val Constien	3000 meters steeplechase	6th	
Women's	2019 Outdoor	Dani Jones	5000 meters	1st	
Women's	2019 Outdoor	Makena Morley	5000 meters	6th	
Women's	2021 Indoor	Sage Hurta	Mile run	1st	
Women's	2021 Outdoor	Sage Hurta	1500 meters	2nd	
Women's	2021 Outdoor	Micaela Degenero	1500 meters	6th	
Men's	2022 Indoor	Eduardo Herrera	3000 meters	5th	
Women's	2022 Indoor	Micaela Degenero	Mile run	1st	
Women's	2022 Indoor	Rachel McArthur	Mile run	4th	
Women's	2022 Indoor	Maddie Boreman	Mile run	8th	
Women's	2022 Indoor	Avery McMullen	Pentathlon	8th	
Women's	2022 Outdoor	Micaela Degenero	1500 meters	2nd	
Women's	2022 Outdoor	Maddie Boreman	3000 meters steeplechase	4th	
Women's	2022 Outdoor	Abby Nichols	5000 meters	6th	
Women's	2022 Outdoor	Emily Covert	10,000 meters	4th	
Women's	2023 Outdoor	Abbey Glynn	400 meters hurdles	8th	
Women's	2024 Indoor	Avery McMullen	Pentathlon	8th	
Women's	2024 Outdoor	Abbey Glynn	400 meters hurdles	8th	
Women's	2024 Outdoor	Bailey Hertenstein	5000 meters	3rd	
Women's	2024 Outdoor	Ella Baran	5000 meters	7th	
Men's	2025 Indoor	Isaiah Givens	Mile run	5th	

== See also ==
- Category:Colorado Buffaloes men's track and field athletes (31)
- Category:Colorado Buffaloes women's track and field athletes (28)
