= Utah Utes track and field =

College track and field team

- University: University of Utah
- Head coach: Kyle Kepler
- Conference: Big 12
- Location: Salt Lake City, Utah
- Outdoor track: McCarthey Family Track & Field Complex
- Nickname: Utes
- Colors: Red and white

The Utah Utes track and field team is the track and field program that represents University of Utah. The Utes compete in NCAA Division I as a member of the Big 12 Conference. The team is based in Salt Lake City, Utah, at the McCarthey Family Track & Field Complex.

The program is coached by Kyle Kepler. The track and field program officially encompasses four teams because the NCAA considers men's and women's indoor track and field and outdoor track and field as separate sports.

Fred Sheffield was the first two-time individual champion for the program, having won the high jump at the 1943 and 1945 NCAA Track and Field Championships.

In 2005, Utah discontinued its men's track and field and cross country programs. The teams were discontinued for financial reasons, with Chris Hill stating that the school was already in compliance with gender equity guidelines.

The women's teams joined the Pac-12 Conference for the 2011-12 season after previously competing in the Western Athletic Conference. They competed in the Mountain Pacific Sports Federation conference for indoor track and field only until their 2020 championships. Beginning for the 2024-25 season, the school joined the Big 12 Conference. Due to the lack of a men's team, they were also called the "Women of Utah".

== Postseason ==
As of August 2025, a total of 20 men and 10 women have achieved individual first-team All-American status for the team at the Division I men's outdoor, women's outdoor, men's indoor, or women's indoor national championships (using the modern criteria of top-8 placing regardless of athlete nationality).

First team NCAA All-Americans
Team	Championships	Name	Event	Place	Ref.
Men's	1927 Outdoor	Doral Pilling	Javelin throw	1st	
Men's	1929 Outdoor	Byron Grant	110 meters hurdles	6th	
Men's	1929 Outdoor	Byron Grant	High jump	5th	
Men's	1929 Outdoor	Byron Grant	Long jump	6th	
Men's	1930 Outdoor	Nate Long	400 meters	6th	
Men's	1935 Outdoor	Knewell Rushforth	High jump	2nd	
Men's	1936 Outdoor	Jack Thornley	Javelin throw	3rd	
Men's	1940 Outdoor	Bud Gehrke	Javelin throw	5th	
Men's	1943 Outdoor	Fred Sheffield	High jump	1st	
Men's	1944 Outdoor	Fred Sheffield	High jump	2nd	
Men's	1944 Outdoor	Fred Sheffield	Long jump	3rd	
Men's	1945 Outdoor	Fred Sheffield	High jump	1st	
Men's	1945 Outdoor	Fred Sheffield	Long jump	3rd	
Men's	1946 Outdoor	Fred Sheffield	High jump	2nd	
Men's	1949 Outdoor	Keith Tolstrup	110 meters hurdles	7th	
Men's	1951 Outdoor	Barney Dyer	High jump	2nd	
Men's	1952 Outdoor	Fred Pratley	High jump	3rd	
Men's	1952 Outdoor	Barney Dyer	High jump	7th	
Men's	1953 Outdoor	Cal Clark	High jump	6th	
Men's	1955 Outdoor	Cal Clark	High jump	6th	
Men's	1957 Outdoor	Ken Christensen	100 meters	8th	
Men's	1961 Outdoor	Blaine Lindgren	110 meters hurdles	3rd	
Men's	1962 Outdoor	Krege Christenson	Javelin throw	7th	
Men's	1963 Outdoor	Krege Christenson	Javelin throw	3rd	
Men's	1964 Outdoor	Craig Smith	Javelin throw	8th	
Men's	1966 Outdoor	Scott Etnyre	Triple jump	7th	
Men's	1967 Outdoor	Scott Etnyre	Triple jump	2nd	
Men's	1968 Outdoor	Scott Bringhurst	5000 meters	5th	
Men's	1970 Outdoor	Doug Wells	Decathlon	5th	
Men's	1971 Outdoor	Scott Bringhurst	10,000 meters	4th	
Men's	1981 Outdoor	Mark Davenport	High jump	6th	
Men's	1982 Indoor	Mark Davenport	High jump	6th	
Women's	1982 Outdoor	Jill Molen	5000 meters	6th	
Women's	1982 Outdoor	Jill Molen	10,000 meters	3rd	
Women's	1989 Outdoor	Brenda Alcorn	High jump	5th	
Women's	1991 Outdoor	Brenda Alcorn	High jump	8th	
Women's	1992 Indoor	Traci Stevens	High jump	6th	
Men's	1998 Outdoor	Jeff Simonich	5000 meters	8th	
Women's	1999 Outdoor	Amy Tidwell	400 meters	8th	
Women's	2004 Indoor	Katie Decker	High jump	7th	
Women's	2013 Indoor	Amanda Mergaert	Mile run	5th	
Women's	2013 Outdoor	Amanda Mergaert	1500 meters	3rd	
Women's	2017 Outdoor	Grayson Murphy	3000 meters steeplechase	5th	
Women's	2018 Outdoor	Grayson Murphy	3000 meters steeplechase	6th	
Women's	2019 Indoor	Sarah Feeny	Mile run	8th	
Women's	2023 Indoor	Simone Plourde	3000 meters	4th	
Women's	2023 Indoor	Emily Venters	5000 meters	5th	
Women's	2023 Outdoor	Emily Venters	5000 meters	3rd	
Women's	2023 Outdoor	Simone Plourde	5000 meters	7th	
Women's	2023 Outdoor	Emily Venters	10,000 meters	2nd	
Women's	2025 Indoor	Brianna Rinn	Distance medley relay	5th	
Women's	2025 Indoor	Emily Martin	Distance medley relay	5th	
Women's	2025 Indoor	Kyla Martin	Distance medley relay	5th	
Women's	2025 Indoor	Erin Vringer	Distance medley relay	5th	

== See also ==
- Category:Utah Utes men's track and field athletes (5)
- Category:Utah Utes women's track and field athletes (3)
