= Miami RedHawks track and field =

American college track and field team

- University: Miami University
- Head coach: Russ Peterson
- Conference: MAC
- Location: Oxford, Ohio
- Outdoor track: George L. Rider Track
- Nickname: RedHawks
- Colors: Red and white

The Miami RedHawks track and field team is the track and field program that represents Miami University. The RedHawks compete in NCAA Division I as a member of the Mid-American Conference. The team is based in Oxford, Ohio, at the George L. Rider Track.

The program is coached by Russ Peterson. The track and field program officially encompasses four teams because the NCAA considers men's and women's indoor track and field and outdoor track and field as separate sports.

Middle-distance runner Charles Shugert became the school's first NCAA champion in 1932 over the two miles distance. In 1986, 800 m runner Karen Bakewell became the first women's national champion, also becoming the first Mid-American Conference women's runner in any discipline to win an NCAA title.

== Postseason ==
As of August 2025, a total of 40 men and 6 women have achieved individual first-team All-American status for the team at the Division I men's outdoor, women's outdoor, men's indoor, or women's indoor national championships (using the modern criteria of top-8 placing regardless of athlete nationality).

First team NCAA All-Americans
Team	Championships	Name	Event	Place	Ref.
Men's	1923 Outdoor	Virgil Perry	Long jump	3rd	
Men's	1926 Outdoor	Tom Sharkey	100 meters	3rd	
Men's	1926 Outdoor	Tom Sharkey	200 meters	2nd	
Men's	1926 Outdoor	Don Emery	3000 meters	4th	
Men's	1929 Outdoor	David Davis	High jump	5th	
Men's	1931 Outdoor	Jim Gordon	400 meters	2nd	
Men's	1931 Outdoor	Charles Shugert	3000 meters	2nd	
Men's	1932 Outdoor	Charles Shugert	3000 meters	1st	
Men's	1934 Outdoor	Armsden Oliver	110 meters hurdles	2nd	
Men's	1934 Outdoor	Armsden Oliver	220 yards hurdles	2nd	
Men's	1938 Outdoor	Larry Bell	Javelin throw	2nd	
Men's	1941 Outdoor	Jack Saunders	110 meters hurdles	2nd	
Men's	1941 Outdoor	Jack Saunders	220 yards hurdles	6th	
Men's	1942 Outdoor	Jack Saunders	110 meters hurdles	3rd	
Men's	1942 Outdoor	Virgil Alston	3000 meters	5th	
Men's	1943 Outdoor	Virgil Alson	3000 meters	4th	
Men's	1944 Outdoor	Harold Fisher	220 yards hurdles	2nd	
Men's	1945 Outdoor	Sylvester Stewart	800 meters	2nd	
Men's	1945 Outdoor	Harold Fisher	220 yards hurdles	3rd	
Men's	1948 Outdoor	Mike Stavole	10,000 meters	5th	
Men's	1950 Outdoor	Phil Hamilton	220 yards hurdles	5th	
Men's	1951 Outdoor	Jim Bailey	100 meters	6th	
Men's	1952 Outdoor	Howard Ficke	High jump	7th	
Men's	1953 Outdoor	Tom Jones	Shot put	3rd	
Men's	1954 Outdoor	Tom Jones	Shot put	1st	
Men's	1955 Outdoor	Tom Jones	Shot put	2nd	
Men's	1955 Outdoor	Tirrel Burton	220 yards hurdles	4th	
Men's	1961 Outdoor	Steve Tekesky	5000 meters	6th	
Men's	1962 Outdoor	Steve Tekesky	5000 meters	5th	
Men's	1964 Outdoor	Jack Bacheler	3000 meters steeplechase	7th	
Men's	1965 Indoor	Rick Cunningham	Mile run	2nd	
Men's	1965 Outdoor	Rick Cunningham	Mile run	6th	
Men's	1965 Outdoor	Jack Bacheler	3000 meters steeplechase	5th	
Men's	1966 Indoor	Steve Brubaker	600 yards	5th	
Men's	1966 Outdoor	Jack Bacheler	3000 meters steeplechase	2nd	
Men's	1967 Indoor	Jim Issacson	Distance medley relay	4th	
Men's	1967 Indoor	Tom Halbedel	Distance medley relay	4th	
Men's	1967 Indoor	Steve Korinchak	Distance medley relay	4th	
Men's	1967 Indoor	Andy Schramm	Distance medley relay	4th	
Men's	1967 Indoor	Ted Downing	High jump	1st	
Men's	1968 Indoor	Ted Downing	High jump	3rd	
Men's	1968 Outdoor	Ted Downing	High jump	6th	
Men's	1968 Outdoor	Les Smith	Pole vault	7th	
Men's	1969 Indoor	Les Smith	Pole vault	1st	
Men's	1970 Indoor	Milan Tiff	Triple jump	1st	
Men's	1970 Outdoor	Dennis Bayham	3000 meters steeplechase	6th	
Men's	1971 Indoor	Scott Wallick	Pole vault	1st	
Men's	1972 Indoor	Scott Wallick	Pole vault	2nd	
Men's	1973 Outdoor	Tom Wesseling	3000 meters steeplechase	7th	
Men's	1979 Indoor	Darrell Sargent	600 yards	4th	
Men's	1980 Outdoor	David Middlebrook	High jump	8th	
Men's	1982 Outdoor	Jeff Ward	Pole vault	5th	
Men's	1983 Outdoor	Brian Carlton	5000 meters	4th	
Men's	1985 Outdoor	Brian Carlton	5000 meters	3rd	
Women's	1986 Outdoor	Karen Bakewell	800 meters	1st	
Men's	1989 Outdoor	John van Scoyoc	10,000 meters	7th	
Women's	1991 Outdoor	Nancy Denny	Javelin throw	7th	
Women's	1992 Outdoor	Molly Cullen	5000 meters	6th	
Women's	1992 Outdoor	Nancy Denny	Javelin throw	8th	
Men's	1993 Indoor	Eric Higgins	High jump	6th	
Men's	1994 Outdoor	Mike Berwanger	Discus throw	6th	
Women's	1996 Outdoor	Becca Williams	400 meters hurdles	4th	
Women's	1997 Outdoor	Becca Williams	400 meters hurdles	5th	
Men's	2004 Outdoor	Jake Dunkleberger	Hammer throw	6th	
Men's	2005 Outdoor	Jake Dunkleberger	Hammer throw	7th	
Men's	2006 Outdoor	Daniel Huling	5000 meters	6th	
Women's	2008 Outdoor	Kristina Bolterstein	High jump	8th	
Women's	2012 Outdoor	Victoria Paterra	Javelin throw	7th	
Women's	2014 Outdoor	Victoria Paterra	Javelin throw	3rd	
Men's	2017 Outdoor	Andrew Dusing	1500 meters	6th	
Men's	2021 Indoor	Finley McLear	800 meters	2nd	
Men's	2021 Indoor	Sean Torpy	Distance medley relay	8th	
Men's	2021 Indoor	Luke Finnegan	Distance medley relay	8th	
Men's	2021 Indoor	Andrew Schroff	Distance medley relay	8th	
Men's	2021 Indoor	Chris Torpy	Distance medley relay	8th	
Men's	2021 Outdoor	Finley McLear	800 meters	4th	

== See also ==
- Category:Miami RedHawks men's track and field athletes (7)
- Category:Miami RedHawks women's track and field athletes (1)
