= High jump at the NCAA Division I Outdoor Track and Field Championships =

This is a list of the NCAA outdoor champions in the high jump. Measurement was conducted in imperial distances (feet and inches) until 1975. Metrication occurred in 1976, so all subsequent championships were measured in metric distances. The women's event began in 1982.

== Winners ==
Key
A=Altitude assisted

Women's high jump winners
Year	Athlete	Team	Height
1982	Thordís Gísladóttir (ISL)	Alabama Crimson Tide	1.86 m (6 ft 1 in)
1983	Thordís Gísladóttir (ISL)	Alabama Crimson Tide	1.87 m (6 ft 1 1/2 in)
1984	Tonya Alston	UCLA Bruins	1.86 m (6 ft 1 in)
1985	Katrena Johnson	Arizona Wildcats	1.93 m (6 ft 3 3/4 in)
1986	Rita Graves	Kansas State Wildcats	1.88 m (6 ft 2 in)
1987	Mazel Thomas (JAM)	Abilene Christian Wildcats	1.89 m (6 ft 2 1/4 in)
1988	Amber Welty	Idaho State Bengals	1.92 m (6 ft 3 1/2 in)
1989	Melinda Clark	Texas A&M Aggies	1.85 m (6 ft 3/4 in)
1990	Angie Bradburn	Texas Longhorns	1.90 m (6 ft 2 3/4 in)
1991	Tanya Hughes	Arizona Wildcats	1.94 m (6 ft 4 1/4 in)
1992	Tanya Hughes	Arizona Wildcats	1.87 m (6 ft 1 1/2 in)
1993	Tanya Hughes	Arizona Wildcats	1.92 m (6 ft 3 1/2 in)
1994	Gai Kapernick (AUS)	LSU Lady Tigers	1.89 m (6 ft 2 1/4 in)
1995	Amy Acuff	UCLA Bruins	1.96 m (6 ft 5 in)
1996	Amy Acuff	UCLA Bruins	1.94 m (6 ft 4 1/4 in)
1997	Kajsa Bergqvist (SWE)	SMU Mustangs	1.93 m (6 ft 3 3/4 in)
1998	Erin Aldrich	Texas Longhorns	1.93 m (6 ft 3 3/4 in)
1999	Kajsa Bergqvist (SWE)	SMU Mustangs	1.90 m (6 ft 2 3/4 in)
2000	Erin Aldrich	Texas Longhorns	1.90 m (6 ft 2 3/4 in)
2001	Dóra Győrffy (HUN)	Harvard Crimson	1.90 m (6 ft 2 3/4 in)
2002	Darnesha Griffith	UCLA Bruins	1.83 m (6 ft 0 in)
2003	Whitney Evans (CAN)	Washington State Cougars	1.86 m (6 ft 1 in)
2004	Chaunté Howard	Georgia Tech Yellow Jackets	1.93 m (6 ft 3 3/4 in)
2005	Sharon Day	Cal Poly Mustangs	1.93 m (6 ft 3 3/4 in)
2006	Destinee Hooker	Texas Longhorns	1.89 m (6 ft 2 1/4 in)
2007	Destinee Hooker	Texas Longhorns	1.92 m (6 ft 3 1/2 in)
2008	Elizabeth Patterson	Arizona Wildcats	1.86 m (6 ft 1 in)
2009	Destinee Hooker	Texas Longhorns	1.95 m (6 ft 4 3/4 in)
2010	Amber Kaufman	Hawaii Rainbow Warriors	1.86 m (6 ft 1 in)
2011	Brigetta Barrett	Arizona Wildcats	1.86 m (6 ft 1 in)
2012	Brigetta Barrett	Arizona Wildcats	1.93 m (6 ft 3 3/4 in)
2013	Brigetta Barrett	Arizona Wildcats	1.95 m (6 ft 4 3/4 in)
2014	Leontia Kallenou (CYP)	Georgia Lady Bulldogs	1.89 m (6 ft 2 1/4 in)
2015	Jeannelle Scheper (LCA)	South Carolina Gamecocks	1.90 m (6 ft 2 3/4 in)
2016	Kimberly Williamson (JAM)	Kansas State Wildcats	1.88 m (6 ft 2 in)
2017	Madeline Fagan	Georgia Lady Bulldogs	1.91 m (6 ft 3 in)
2018	Alexus Henry	UT Arlington Mavericks	1.82 m (5 ft 11 1/2 in)
2019	Nicole Greene	North Carolina Tar Heels	1.87 m (6 ft 1 1/2 in)
2021	Rachel Glenn	South Carolina Gamecocks	1.93 m (6 ft 3 3/4 in)
2022	Lamara Distin (JAM)	Texas A&M Aggies	1.95 m (6 ft 4 3/4 in)
2023	Charity Hufnagel	Ball State Cardinals	1.93 m (6 ft 3 3/4 in)
2024	Rose Amoanimaa Yeboah (GHA)	Illinois Fighting Illini	1.97 m (6 ft 5 1/2 in)
2024	Elena Kulichenko (CYP)	Georgia Lady Bulldogs	1.97 m (6 ft 5 1/2 in)
2025	Elena Kulichenko (CYP)	Georgia Lady Bulldogs	1.96 m (6 ft 5 in)
2026	Temitope Adeshina (NGA)	Texas Tech Lady Raiders	1.96 m (6 ft 5 in)

Men's high jump winners
Year	Athlete	Team	Height
1921	John Murphy	Notre Dame Fighting Irish	1.905 m (6 ft 3 in)
1922	John Murphy	Notre Dame Fighting Irish	1.895 m (6 ft 2 1/2 in)
1922	Harold Osborn	Illinois Fighting Illini	1.895 m (6 ft 2 1/2 in)
1923	Tom Poor	Kansas Jayhawks	1.855 m (6 ft 1 in)
1924	not held		
1925	Thomas Bransford	Missouri Tigers	1.88 m (6 ft 2 in)
1925	Oather Hampton	California Golden Bears &	1.88 m (6 ft 2 in)
1925	Justin Russell	Chicago Maroons	1.88 m (6 ft 2 in)
1926	Rufus Haggard	Texas Longhorns	2.015 m (6 ft 7 1/4 in)
1927	Anton Burg	Chicago Maroons &	1.97 m (6 ft 5 1/2 in)
1927	Rufus Haggard	Texas Longhorns	1.97 m (6 ft 5 1/2 in)
1928	Robert King	Stanford Cardinal	1.995 m (6 ft 6 1/2 in)
1929	Parker Shelby	Oklahoma Sooners	1.905 m (6 ft 3 in)
1930	James Stewart	USC Trojans	1.925 m (6 ft 3 3/4 in)
1931	Darrell Jones	Ball State Cardinals	1.925 m (6 ft 3 3/4 in)
1932	Bert Nelson	Butler Bulldogs	1.975 m (6 ft 5 3/4 in)
1933	Duncan McNaughton (CAN)	USC Trojans &	1.93 m (6 ft 3 3/4 in)
1933	Vincent Murphy	Notre Dame Fighting Irish	1.93 m (6 ft 3 3/4 in)
1934	Walter Marty	Fresno State Bulldogs &	2.00 m (6 ft 6 1/2 in)
1934	George Spitz	NYU Violets	2.00 m (6 ft 6 1/2 in)
1935	Linn Philson	Drake Bulldogs	1.95 m (6 ft 4 3/4 in)
1936	Dave Albritton	Ohio State Buckeyes &	1.985 m (6 ft 6 in)
1936	Mel Walker	Ohio State Buckeyes	1.985 m (6 ft 6 in)
1937	Dave Albritton	Ohio State Buckeyes &	1.99 m (6 ft 6 1/4 in)
1937	Gil Cruter	Colorado Buffaloes	1.99 m (6 ft 6 1/4 in)
1938	Dave Albritton	Ohio State Buckeyes &	2.05 m (6 ft 8 1/2 in)
1938	Gil Cruter	Colorado Buffaloes	2.05 m (6 ft 8 1/2 in)
1939	John Wilson	USC Trojans	1.98 m (6 ft 5 3/4 in)
1940	Don Canham	Michigan Wolverines &	1.99 m (6 ft 6 1/4 in)
1940	John Wilson	USC Trojans	1.99 m (6 ft 6 1/4 in)
1941	Les Steers	Oregon Ducks	2.105 m (6 ft 10 3/4 in)
1942	Adam Berry	Southern Jaguars	2.025 m (6 ft 7 1/2 in)
1943	Fred Sheffield	Utah Utes	2.03 m (6 ft 7 3/4 in)
1944	Ken Wiesner	Marquette Golden Eagles	2.01 m (6 ft 7 in)
1945	Fred Sheffield	Utah Utes &	1.995 m (6 ft 6 1/2 in)
1945	Ken Wiesner	Marquette Golden Eagles	1.995 m (6 ft 6 1/2 in)
1946	Ken Wiesner	Marquette Golden Eagles	2.04 m (6 ft 8 1/4 in)
1947	Irv Mondschein	NYU Violets	2.00 m (6 ft 6 1/2 in)A
1948	Dick Eddleman	Illinois Fighting Illini &	2.005 m (6 ft 6 3/4 in)
1948	Irv Mondschein	NYU Violets	2.005 m (6 ft 6 3/4 in)
1949	Richard Phillips	Brown Bears	2.005 m (6 ft 6 3/4 in)
1950	Vern McGrew	Rice Owls	2.005 m (6 ft 6 3/4 in)
1951	Lewis Hall	Florida Gators	2.055 m (6 ft 8 3/4 in)
1952	Emery Barnes	Oregon Ducks &	2.03 m (6 ft 7 3/4 in)
1952	Walt "Buddy" Davis	Texas A&M Aggies	2.03 m (6 ft 7 3/4 in)
1953	Lewis Hall	Florida Gators	2.035 m (6 ft 8 in)
1953	Milt Mead	Michigan Wolverines &	2.035 m (6 ft 8 in)
1953	Mark Smith	Wayne State Warriors	2.035 m (6 ft 8 in)
1954	Ernie Shelton	USC Trojans	2.09 m (6 ft 10 1/4 in)
1955	Ernie Shelton	USC Trojans	2.11 m (6 ft 11 in)
1956	Nick Dyer	UCLA Bruins	1.99 m (6 ft 6 1/4 in)
1956	Bob Lang	Missouri Tigers &	1.99 m (6 ft 6 1/4 in)
1956	Phil Reavis	Villanova Wildcats	1.99 m (6 ft 6 1/4 in)
1957	Don Stewart	SMU Mustangs &	2.02 m (6 ft 7 1/2 in)
1957	Al Urbanckas	Illinois Fighting Illini	2.02 m (6 ft 7 1/2 in)
1958	Don Stewart	SMU Mustangs	2.065 m (6 ft 9 1/4 in)
1959	Wayne Moss	Oregon State Beavers &	2.075 m (6 ft 9 1/2 in)
1959	Errol Williams	San Jose State Spartans	2.075 m (6 ft 9 1/2 in)
1960	John Thomas	Boston University Terriers	2.135 m (7 ft 0 in)
1961	John Thomas	Boston University Terriers	2.185 m (7 ft 2 in)
1962	Roger Olson	California Golden Bears	2.085 m (6 ft 10 in)
1963	Lew Hoyt	USC Trojans	2.065 m (6 ft 9 1/4 in)A
1964	John Rambo	Long Beach State Beach	2.145 m (7 ft 1/4 in)
1965	Frank Costello	Maryland Terrapins	2.11 m (6 ft 11 in)
1966	Otis Burrell	Nevada Wolf Pack	2.16 m (7 ft 1 in)
1967	Steve Brown	Idaho Vandals	2.16 m (7 ft 1 in)A
1968	Dick Fosbury	Oregon State Beavers	2.19 m (7 ft 2 in)
1969	Dick Fosbury	Oregon State Beavers	2.195 m (7 ft 2 1/4 in)
1970	Pat Matzdorf	Wisconsin Badgers	2.16 m (7 ft 1 in)
1971	Reynaldo Brown	Cal Poly Mustangs	2.21 m (7 ft 3 in)
1972	Tom Woods	Oregon State Beavers	2.215 m (7 ft 3 in)
1973	Reynaldo Brown	Cal Poly Mustangs	2.235 m (7 ft 3 3/4 in)
1974	Randy Smith	Kansas Jayhawks	2.185 m (7 ft 2 in)
1975	Warren Shanklin	Louisiana–Monroe Warhawks	2.16 m (7 ft 1 in)A
1976	Dwight Stones	Long Beach State Beach	2.31 m (7 ft 6 3/4 in)
1977	Kyle Arney	Arizona State Sun Devils	2.285 m (7 ft 5 3/4 in)
1978	Franklin Jacobs	Fairleigh Dickinson Knights	2.21 m (7 ft 3 in)
1979	Nat Page	Missouri Tigers	2.25 m (7 ft 4 1/2 in)
1980	Jeff Woodard	Alabama Crimson Tide	2.32 m (7 ft 7 1/4 in)
1981	Leo Williams	Navy Midshipmen	2.25 m (7 ft 4 1/2 in)
1982	Milt Ottey (CAN)	UTEP Miners	2.32 m (7 ft 7 1/4 in)A
1983	Richie Thompson	Houston Christian Huskies	2.27 m (7 ft 5 1/4 in)
1984	Jake Jacoby	Boise State Broncos	2.26 m (7 ft 4 3/4 in)
1985	Thomas Eriksson (SWE)	Lamar Cardinals	2.32 m (7 ft 7 1/4 in)
1986	James Lott	Texas Longhorns	2.21 m (7 ft 3 in)
1987	Thomas Smith	Illinois State Redbirds	2.28 m (7 ft 5 3/4 in)
1988	Thomas Smith	Illinois State Redbirds	2.33 m (7 ft 7 1/2 in)
1989	Hollis Conway	Louisiana Ragin' Cajuns	2.38 m (7 ft 9 1/2 in)A
1990	Charles Austin	Texas State Bobcats	2.33 m (7 ft 7 1/2 in)
1991	Darrin Plab	Southern Illinois Salukis	2.3 m (7 ft 6 1/2 in)
1992	Darrin Plab	Southern Illinois Salukis	2.34 m (7 ft 8 in)
1993	Randy Jenkins	Tennessee Volunteers	2.28 m (7 ft 5 3/4 in)
1994	Randy Jenkins	Tennessee Volunteers	2.31 m (7 ft 6 3/4 in)
1995	Ray Doakes	Arkansas Razorbacks	2.25 m (7 ft 4 1/2 in)
1996	Eric Bishop	North Carolina Tar Heels	2.29 m (7 ft 6 in)
1997	Ivan Wagner	Texas Longhorns	2.3 m (7 ft 6 1/2 in)
1998	Nathan Leeper	Kansas State Wildcats	2.28 m (7 ft 5 3/4 in)
1999	Mark Boswell (CAN)	Texas Longhorns	2.33 m (7 ft 7 1/2 in)
2000	Mark Boswell (CAN)	Texas Longhorns	2.31 m (7 ft 6 3/4 in)
2001	Charles Clinger	Weber State Wildcats	2.3 m (7 ft 6 1/2 in)
2002	Tora Harris	Princeton Tigers	2.25 m (7 ft 4 1/2 in)
2003	Dawid Jaworski (POL)	USC Trojans	2.28 m (7 ft 5 3/4 in)
2004	Andra Manson	Texas Longhorns	2.32 m (7 ft 7 1/4 in)
2005	Jesse Williams	USC Trojans	2.29 m (7 ft 6 in)
2006	Jesse Williams	USC Trojans	2.32 m (7 ft 7 1/4 in)
2007	Scott Sellers	Kansas State Wildcats	2.32 m (7 ft 7 1/4 in)
2008	Michael Hanany	Nebraska Cornhuskers	2.32 m (7 ft 7 1/4 in)
2009	Scott Sellers	Kansas State Wildcats	2.26 m (7 ft 4 3/4 in)
2010	Derek Drouin (CAN)	Indiana Hoosiers	2.26 m (7 ft 4 3/4 in)
2011	Erik Kynard	Kansas State Wildcats	2.29 m (7 ft 6 in)
2012	Erik Kynard	Kansas State Wildcats	2.34 m (7 ft 8 in)
2013	Derek Drouin (CAN)	Indiana Hoosiers	2.34 m (7 ft 8 in)
2014	Bryan McBride	Arizona State Sun Devils	2.28 m (7 ft 5 3/4 in)
2015	Jacorian Duffield	Texas Tech Red Raiders	2.28 m (7 ft 5 3/4 in)
2016	Randall Cunningham II	USC Trojans	2.25 m (7 ft 4 1/2 in)
2017	Christoff Bryan (JAM)	Kansas State Wildcats	2.21 m (7 ft 3 in)
2018	Tejaswin Shankar (IND)	Kansas State Wildcats	2.24 m (7 ft 4 in)
2019	JuVaughn Harrison	LSU Tigers	2.27 m (7 ft 5 1/4 in)
2020	Not held due to COVID-19		
2021	JuVaughn Harrison	LSU Tigers	2.33 m (7 ft 7 1/2 in)
2022	Tejaswin Shankar (IND)	Kansas State Wildcats	2.27 m (7 ft 5 1/4 in)
2023	Romaine Beckford (JAM)	South Florida Bulls	2.27 m (7 ft 5 1/4 in)
2024	Romaine Beckford (JAM)	Arkansas Razorbacks	2.26 m (7 ft 4 3/4 in)
2025	Arvesta Troupe	Ole Miss Rebels	2.27 m (7 ft 5 1/4 in)
2026	Kimani Jack (ENG)	Georgia Bulldogs	2.28 m (7 ft 5 3/4 in)
