= Western Michigan Broncos track and field =

American college track and field team

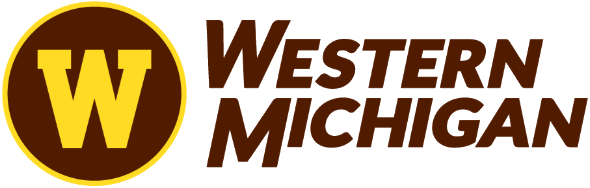
- University: Western Michigan University
- Head coach: Andrea Grove-McDonough
- Conference: MAC
- Location: Kalamazoo, Michigan
- Outdoor track: Kanley Track
- Nickname: Broncos
- Colors: Brown and gold

The Western Michigan Broncos track and field team is the track and field program that represents Western Michigan University. The Broncos compete in NCAA Division I as a member of the Mid-American Conference. The team is based in Kalamazoo, Michigan, at the Kanley Track.

The program is coached by Andrea Grove-McDonough. The track and field program officially encompasses four teams because the NCAA considers men's and women's indoor track and field and outdoor track and field as separate sports.

Ira Murchison won the school's first individual NCAA title. The sprinter won the 100 yards at the 1958 NCAA Track and Field Championships. The track and field and cross country teams brought the school their only national championships by winning the 1964 NCAA University Division cross country championships and 1965 NCAA University Division cross country championships.

The men's track and field team was founded in 1915. It was eliminated along with the women's skating program in December 2003 by then-University president Judith Bailey, effective for the 2004-05 school year. Cutting the track team was estimated to save US$370,000. There was an effort to revive the men's teams in 2009, but it was not successful.

== Postseason ==
As of August 2025, a total of 41 men and 5 women have achieved individual first-team All-American status for the team at the Division I men's outdoor, women's outdoor, men's indoor, or women's indoor national championships (using the modern criteria of top-8 placing regardless of athlete nationality).

First team NCAA All-Americans
| Team | Championships | Name | Event | Place | Ref. |
|---|---|---|---|---|---|
| Men's | 1921 Outdoor | Will Praeger | Discus throw | 3rd | |
| Men's | 1922 Outdoor | Hillard Hulscher | Shot put | 4th | |
| Men's | 1923 Outdoor | Towner Smith | 400 meters | 2nd | |
| Men's | 1929 Outdoor | Cam Hackle | High jump | 5th | |
| Men's | 1930 Outdoor | Ray Swartz | Mile run | 4th | |
| Men's | 1931 Outdoor | Norm Schrier | High jump | 6th | |
| Men's | 1932 Outdoor | Norm Schrier | High jump | 6th | |
| Men's | 1944 Outdoor | Charles Rice | 3000 meters | 5th | |
| Men's | 1944 Outdoor | Byfrod Barr | Long jump | 4th | |
| Men's | 1944 Outdoor | Byford Barr | Javelin throw | 4th | |
| Men's | 1945 Outdoor | Bill Moore | Pole vault | 2nd | |
| Men's | 1945 Outdoor | Ralph Welton | Long jump | 5th | |
| Men's | 1954 Outdoor | Ira Murchison | 200 meters | 8th | |
| Men's | 1957 Outdoor | Ira Murchison | 100 meters | 2nd | |
| Men's | 1958 Outdoor | Ira Murchison | 100 meters | 1st | |
| Men's | 1958 Outdoor | Ira Murchison | 200 meters | 5th | |
| Men's | 1959 Outdoor | Jerry Ashmore | 5000 meters | 4th | |
| Men's | 1960 Outdoor | Jerry Ashmore | 5000 meters | 8th | |
| Men's | 1961 Outdoor | John Bork | 800 meters | 1st | |
| Men's | 1961 Outdoor | Don Tretheway | 3000 meters steeplechase | 5th | |
| Men's | 1961 Outdoor | Jerry Ashmore | 5000 meters | 3rd | |
| Men's | 1961 Outdoor | Jim Oliphant | High jump | 3rd | |
| Men's | 1961 Outdoor | Alonzo Littlejohn | High jump | 8th | |
| Men's | 1962 Outdoor | Jerry Bashaw | 3000 meters steeplechase | 8th | |
| Men's | 1962 Outdoor | Alonzo Littlejohn | High jump | 2nd | |
| Men's | 1965 Indoor | Bruce Burston | Mile run | 3rd | |
| Men's | 1965 Outdoor | Dennis Holland | Long jump | 3rd | |
| Men's | 1966 Outdoor | Steve Straunch | 4 × 100 meters relay | 5th | |
| Men's | 1966 Outdoor | Boice Bowman | 4 × 100 meters relay | 5th | |
| Men's | 1966 Outdoor | Don Castronovo | 4 × 100 meters relay | 5th | |
| Men's | 1966 Outdoor | Horace Coleman | 4 × 100 meters relay | 5th | |
| Men's | 1967 Outdoor | Chuck Lemon | 400 meters hurdles | 5th | |
| Men's | 1968 Indoor | Tom Randolph | 400 meters | 2nd | |
| Men's | 1968 Outdoor | Tom Randolph | 100 meters | 5th | |
| Men's | 1968 Outdoor | Steve Straughn | 4 × 100 meters relay | 3rd | |
| Men's | 1968 Outdoor | Horace Coleman | 4 × 100 meters relay | 3rd | |
| Men's | 1968 Outdoor | Don Castronovo | 4 × 100 meters relay | 3rd | |
| Men's | 1968 Outdoor | Tom Randolph | 4 × 100 meters relay | 3rd | |
| Men's | 1969 Indoor | Tom Randolph | 400 meters | 3rd | |
| Men's | 1969 Outdoor | Tom Randolph | 200 meters | 2nd | |
| Men's | 1969 Outdoor | Doug Lambert | Pole vault | 7th | |
| Men's | 1970 Outdoor | Jeromee Liebenberg | 3000 meters steeplechase | 2nd | |
| Men's | 1971 Outdoor | Jeromee Liebenberg | 3000 meters steeplechase | 3rd | |
| Men's | 1971 Outdoor | John Bennett | 10,000 meters | 6th | |
| Men's | 1972 Indoor | Gary Harris | 3000 meters | 2nd | |
| Men's | 1976 Indoor | Mike Schomer | Weight throw | 2nd | |
| Men's | 1976 Outdoor | Tom Duits | 1500 meters | 8th | |
| Men's | 1977 Outdoor | Tom Duits | 1500 meters | 5th | |
| Men's | 1978 Indoor | Tom Duits | Mile run | 5th | |
| Men's | 1978 Outdoor | Ron Parisi | Javelin throw | 6th | |
| Men's | 1979 Indoor | Dave Beauchamp | 4 × 800 meters relay | 2nd | |
| Men's | 1979 Indoor | Mike Karasiewicz | 4 × 800 meters relay | 2nd | |
| Men's | 1979 Indoor | Mike Thompson | 4 × 800 meters relay | 2nd | |
| Men's | 1979 Indoor | Jack McIntosh | 4 × 800 meters relay | 2nd | |
| Men's | 1979 Outdoor | Jack McIntosh | 800 meters | 2nd | |
| Men's | 1980 Outdoor | Jack McIntosh | 800 meters | 7th | |
| Men's | 1981 Indoor | Dave Beauchamp | 4 × 800 meters relay | 3rd | |
| Men's | 1981 Indoor | Gordon McIntosh | 4 × 800 meters relay | 3rd | |
| Men's | 1981 Indoor | Dana Houston | 4 × 800 meters relay | 3rd | |
| Men's | 1981 Indoor | Kurt Liechty | 4 × 800 meters relay | 3rd | |
| Men's | 1981 Outdoor | Chuck Greene | Javelin throw | 8th | |
| Men's | 1982 Indoor | Mike Fowler | 4 × 800 meters relay | 6th | |
| Men's | 1982 Indoor | Gordon McIntosh | 4 × 800 meters relay | 6th | |
| Men's | 1982 Indoor | Jack McIntosh | 4 × 800 meters relay | 6th | |
| Men's | 1982 Indoor | Kurt Liechty | 4 × 800 meters relay | 6th | |
| Men's | 1982 Outdoor | Jack McIntosh | 800 meters | 2nd | |
| Men's | 1985 Indoor | Tom Broekema | Distance medley relay | 5th | |
| Men's | 1985 Indoor | Robert Louis | Distance medley relay | 5th | |
| Men's | 1985 Indoor | Brad Mora | Distance medley relay | 5th | |
| Men's | 1985 Indoor | Eric Teutsch | Distance medley relay | 5th | |
| Men's | 1985 Outdoor | Alex Washington | 110 meters hurdles | 6th | |
| Women's | 1987 Outdoor | Caroline Mullen | 5000 meters | 4th | |
| Men's | 1988 Indoor | Jamie Hence | 55 meters hurdles | 5th | |
| Men's | 1988 Indoor | Robert Louis | 200 meters | 5th | |
| Men's | 1990 Outdoor | Jesse McGuire | 10,000 meters | 7th | |
| Men's | 1991 Outdoor | Vinton Bennett | High jump | 3rd | |
| Men's | 1992 Outdoor | Vinton Bennett | High jump | 3rd | |
| Men's | 1992 Outdoor | Briane Keene | Javelin throw | 7th | |
| Women's | 1993 Indoor | Jill Stamison | 800 meters | 3rd | |
| Men's | 1993 Outdoor | Brian Keane | Javelin throw | 4th | |
| Women's | 1993 Outdoor | Jill Stamison | 800 meters | 4th | |
| Men's | 1994 Indoor | Jeff Brandenburg | Shot put | 7th | |
| Men's | 1995 Indoor | Jeff Brandenburg | Shot put | 7th | |
| Men's | 1995 Outdoor | Jeff Brandenburg | Shot put | 8th | |
| Men's | 1996 Indoor | Burger Lambrechts | Shot put | 3rd | |
| Men's | 1996 Outdoor | Burger Lambrechts | Shot put | 8th | |
| Men's | 1997 Outdoor | Phil McMullen | Decathlon | 2nd | |
| Men's | 1998 Outdoor | Phil McMullen | Decathlon | 5th | |
| Women's | 2008 Indoor | Becky Horn | 800 meters | 5th | |
| Women's | 2008 Outdoor | Danielle Brown | 400 meters hurdles | 7th | |
| Women's | 2008 Outdoor | Becky Horn | 800 meters | 3rd | |
| Women's | 2010 Indoor | Irene Cooper | Weight throw | 3rd | |

== See also ==
- Category:Western Michigan Broncos men's track and field athletes (6)
