= 2009 Foot Locker Cross Country Championships =

The 2009 Foot Locker Cross Country Championships were held in San Diego, California on December 12, 2009. It was the twentieth edition of the championships, held in Balboa Park for the eighth straight year.

== Results ==
=== Championship Boy's Race ===
Individual race
Rank	Athlete	State	Time (m:s)
Gold medal	Lukas Verzbicas	Illinois	15:08
Silver medal	Matthew McElroy	California	15:23
Bronze medal	Wade Meddles	Nevada	15:24
4	Craig Lutz	Texas	15:30
5	Brian Shrader	Arizona	15:31
6	Jake Hurysz	North Carolina	15:32
7	Tyler Byrne	Indiana	15:34
8	Kirubel Erassa	Georgia	15:35
9	Shane Moskowitz	Washington	15:35
10	Matthew Mizereck	Florida	15:37
11	Chris Walden	Indiana	15:38
12	Steve Magnuson	Arizona	15:38
13	Martin Grady	Illinois	15:38
14	Brandon Lord	Tennessee	15:40
15	Dave Oster	New Jersey	15:42
16	Tyler Udland	New Jersey	15:43
17	Scott Fauble	Colorado	15:44
18	Kevin Dowd	Virginia	15:44
19	Quinn Raseman	New York	15:45
20	Blake Williams	North Carolina	15:46
21	Brad Miles	Pennsylvania	15:46
