= Fred Sheffield =

American basketball player

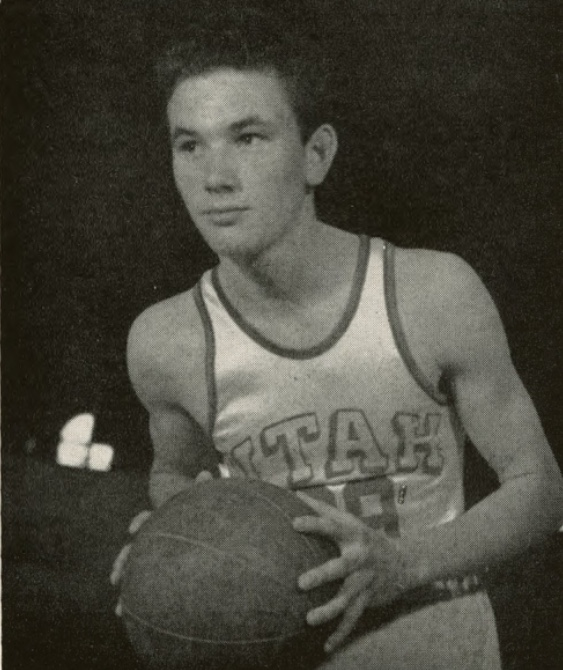
- Sheffield from the 1944 Utonian

Personal information
- Born: November 5, 1923 Kaysville, Utah, U.S.
- Died: December 8, 2009 (aged 86)
- Listed height: 6 ft 2 in (1.88 m)
- Listed weight: 165 lb (75 kg)

Career information
- High school: Davis (Kaysville, Utah)
- College: Utah (1942–1946)
- Position: Forward
- Number: 4

Career history
- 1946–1947: Philadelphia Warriors

Career highlights
- NCAA champion (1944)
- Stats at NBA.com
- Stats at Basketball Reference

Frederick Jolley Sheffield (November 5, 1923 – December 8, 2009) was an American basketball player. He won an NCAA championship with the University of Utah in 1944 and played one season for the Philadelphia Warriors in the Basketball Association of America (BAA).

Sheffield, a 6'2 forward and center, played for Utah and, as a sophomore, was a member of the Utes' 1944 national championship team. While many college athletes were called to serve for the military during World War II, Sheffield had a deferment as a pre-medicine major.

Sheffield was also an accomplished track and field athlete. He was the men's collegiate champion in the high jump in 1943 and 1945 and placed in the podium several times at the USA Outdoor Track and Field Championships. Sheffield also placed in the long jump podium at the 1944 and 1945 NCAA track and field championships.

After the conclusion of his collegiate career, Sheffield played for the Philadelphia Warriors in the BAA for the 1946–47 season. Sheffield averaged 3.4 points in 22 games in a reserve role, but was cut by the team before the Warriors went on to win the inaugural BAA championship. Sheffield became a doctor, practicing for most of his adult life. Sheffield died on December 8, 2009.

== BAA career statistics ==
Legend
GP	Games played
FG%	Field-goal percentage
FT%	Free-throw percentage
APG	Assists per game
PPG	Points per game

=== Regular season ===
Year	Team	GP	FG%	FT%	APG	PPG
1946–47	Philadelphia	22	.199	.615	.2	3.4
Career		22	.199	.615	.2	3.4
