= PLAB =

PLAB or Plab may refer to:

== Science and technology ==
- GDF15 (Growth/differentiation factor 15), a protein
- Photronics Inc (NASDAQ: PLAB), an American semiconductor photomask manufacturer
- Phospholipase A
- Professional and Linguistic Assessments Board, a UK medical test

== Other uses ==
- Pimsleur Language Aptitude Battery, a foreign language test
- Paya Lebar Air Base, a military airbase in Singapore
- Darrin Plab (born 1970), retired American high jumper
