= John Lewis Cooper =

Liberian businessman and government official

- Born: 1908
- Died: 1961 (aged 52–53)
- Occupation(s): Businessman, government official

John Lewis Cooper (1908–1961) was a Liberian businessman and government official who was responsible for the telecommunications developments in Liberia during the presidency of William Tubman.

== Early life and family ==
John Lewis Cooper was born in Monrovia, Liberia to Reverend Randolph Cassius Cooper I and Sarah Ellen Cooper, née Morris. He was married to Eugenia Simpson. They had four children, three natural born and one adopted: John Lewis Jr, Julius Everett Sr., Ora and Elenora. His granddaughter was Hannah Gizelle Cooper, a Liberian-American hurdler who competed in the 2000 Summer Olympics. He is the paternal grandfather of journalist Helene Cooper.

== Education ==
John Lewis Cooper studied at the College of West Africa and Liberia College.

== Career and government service ==
John Lewis was instrumental in the establishment of radio and electricity throughout rural Liberia. He held the cabinet portfolio for telecommunications in Liberia and was decorated for his service to his country. He was popularly known as 'Radio Cooper'.

== Death ==
John Lewis Cooper died in 1961 in Monrovia.
