= Hannah Cooper =

Liberian hurd

Personal information
- Nationality: Liberian
- Born: 10 June 1979 (age 47)

Sport
- Sport: Track and field
- Event: 100 metres hurdles

Hannah Gizelle Cooper (born 10 June 1979) is a Liberian hurdler. She competed in the women's 100 metres hurdles at the 2000 Summer Olympics.

Cooper was born in Liberia; her grandfather was Liberian businessman and government official John Lewis Cooper. She grew up in Hawthorne, California and competed for Hawthorne High School. As a junior in 1996, she had the sixth-fastest 300 meters hurdles prep time in the United States that year.

Cooper was seeded in the fifth 100 metres hurdles heat at the 2000 Olympics. She placed 7th in 13.51 seconds and did not advance.

Cooper attended the University of Colorado at Boulder. She was a multiple-time All-American for the Colorado Buffaloes track and field team, placing 7th in the 100 meters hurdles at the 2002 NCAA Division I Outdoor Track and Field Championships. She met Sultan Tucker at the 2001 NCAA Division I Outdoor Track and Field Championships, where she told him about Liberia's Olympic team. Her rival was Nichole Denby, who she competed against in the Big 12 Conference.
