= Athletics at the 2007 Pan American Games – Women's 10,000 metres =

Women's 10,000 metres at the Pan American Games

The women's 10,000 metres event at the 2007 Pan American Games was held on July 23.

== Results ==
Rank	Name	Nationality	Time	Notes
1st place, gold medalist(s)	Sara Slattery	United States	32:54.41	GR
2nd place, silver medalist(s)	Dulce María Rodríguez	Mexico	32:56.75	
3rd place, bronze medalist(s)	Lucélia Peres	Brazil	33:19.48	SB
4	Nora Rocha	Mexico	33:33.72	
5	Ines Melchor	Peru	33:36.17	PB
6	Emily McCabe	United States	33:39.61	PB
7	Ednalva da Silva	Brazil	34:09.21	
8	Bertha Sánchez	Colombia	34:13.25	SB
9	Jimena Misayauri	Peru	34:30.51	PB
10	Martha Tenorio	Ecuador	36:47.30	
