= Foot Locker Cross Country Championships =

Sports event

The High School Cross Country National Championships ("XC Championships"), formerly known as the Foot Locker Cross Country Championships and now the Brooks XC Championships, is a series of annual cross country running races held in various regions of the United States to determine the premier cross country runner in various age groups, but mainly served to find the best prep (high school) cross country athlete in the country. The event began in 1979 by the F. W. Woolworth Company, which initially branded it as the Kinney Cross Country Championships, (for the Kinney Shoes division) at Morley Field Sports Complex in Balboa Park in San Diego, California, before Woolworth rebranded the event in 1993 to the Foot Locker Cross Country Championships for Woolworth's sporting goods company. For most people associated with the sport, the name was just shortened to Foot Locker or even abbreviated in agate results as FL (the ticker symbol of the company today). In 2021 the event was rebranded as the Eastbay Cross Country Championships and then again as the Champs Sports XC Championships in 2022 after the Foot Locker owned company, only to return to the Foot Locker Cross Country Championships in 2023. The event is the longest-running national cross country race for high school students. On August 21, 2025, it was announced the series would be no longer be supported and hosted by Foot Locker. Days later on August 29, 2025, Brooks and Fleet Feet announced that they would be continuing the series under a new name and sponsorship. On December 13, 2025, the first Brooks XC Championships national event was held in Balboa Park.

== Regional championships ==
Annually there were a total of four regional championship races (usually in late November), that lead up to the XC Championships in San Diego in December.

=== Northeast Regional Championships ===
The Northeast Region, now the Northeast XC Championships, comprised most of the states in New England (Massachusetts, Connecticut, New Hampshire, Maine, Rhode Island, and Vermont) plus Pennsylvania, New York, Maryland, Delaware, New Jersey, and the District of Columbia. After being held at Van Cortlandt Park in the Bronx, New York for its first 30 years, in 2009 it moved to Sunken Meadow State Park in Kings Park, Long Island, before moving back to Van Cortlandt Park in 2012. In 2023 the event moved to Franklin Park in Boston, MA, and in 2026 it moved to Holmdel Park in Holmdel, New Jersey.

=== Midwest Regional Championships ===
The Midwest Region, now the Midwest XC Championships, comprised the heartland states and was once the largest region in the series, which has states including: Minnesota, Wisconsin, Iowa, North Dakota, South Dakota, Illinois, Nebraska, Colorado, Kansas, Ohio, Indiana, Missouri, and Michigan. This event is held at the University of Wisconsin–Parkside yearly in Kenosha, Wisconsin.

=== South Regional Championships ===
The South Region, now the South XC Championships, was made up of states in the southern and southeastern United States including: Florida, Texas, Kentucky, South Carolina, North Carolina, Alabama, Georgia, Oklahoma, Tennessee, Virginia, Arkansas, Mississippi, West Virginia, and Louisiana. The South Region event is held annually at the Larry McAfee Cross Country Course in Charlotte, North Carolina, located within McAlpine Creek Park.

=== West Regional Championships ===
The West Region, now the West XC Championships, was considered by many to be the most potent region with the most runners appearing at the XC Championships. States included in the west: California, Washington, Utah, Idaho, Montana, Arizona, New Mexico, Nevada, Alaska, Hawaii, Oregon, Wyoming, and Overseas Military. This regional race is generally conducted at Mount San Antonio College in Walnut, California and is generally a week later than the other three regional races.

== National Championship ==
The XC Championship was held annually in San Diego's Balboa Park (though it has been held in Orlando, Florida on seven occasions), just as it started in 1979. A total of 40 elite cross country runners raced 5 kilometers (3.1 mi), for superiority in both individual and regional standings. The top ten runners from each region were invited to the national championship in San Diego, with each region also sending two alternates. From 1981–2004, the race had 32 runners, with each region sending eight. In 1979–1980, there were 35 runners from five regions. Starting in 2025, Brooks and Fleet Feet introduced "Golden Ticket" qualifiers to the XC Championships, which brought the total runners (including the 10 qualifiers from each region) to the best 50 boys and 50 girls.

== Race divisions ==
The number of divisions vastly differs on the region, however there are races set aside for specific age groups and sometimes one or two open events for athletes not in high school (parents, fans, supporters) to compete in.

=== Common regional divisions ===
- Seeded/Championship Girls
- Seeded/Championship Boys
- Freshman Girls
- Freshman Boys
- Sophomore Girls
- Sophomore Boys
- Junior Girls
- Junior Boys
- Senior Girls
- Senior Boys

=== Additional regional divisions (may vary annually between regions) ===
- Open races for both boys and girls
- Masters for both men and women
- 7th and 8th grade
- Ages 10 and under
- Ages 11 and 12
- Ages 13 and 14

== Courses ==
The XC Championships started off as a small event in San Diego, California in 1979. The races moved to Orlando for the 1981 and 1982 national championships, but quickly was moved back to Balboa Park in San Diego in 1983. Additional races run in Orlando were held in 1997, 1998, 1999, 2000, and 2001, before returning back to Balboa Park again in 2002.

=== Orlando, Florida ===
The Orlando course was extremely flat, but deceivingly slow in terms of runners' times. Patches of grass and sand were scattered throughout the flat, 5,000m course.

All-Time Orlando Kinney/FL Cross Country Championships Record—Boys: Dathan Ritzenhein, 14:29, 1999

All-Time Orlando Kinney/FL Cross Country Championships Record—Girls: Amber Trotter, 16:24, 2001

=== San Diego, California ===
Balboa Park in San Diego has served as the most frequent venue for the national championships. The course is winded in a figure-8 fashion through the Morley Field portion of the nearly 5 km^{2} (1.9 sq mi) park. There is no shortage of hills and mounds, which makes this course the definitive cross country course. (Although the San Diego venue has always been Balboa Park, the XC Championships in 1979 and 1980 were run on a course other than Morley Field—a course on the western edge of Balboa Park.)

All-Time Balboa Park San Diego/CA Cross Country Championships Record—Boys: Reuben Reina, 14:36, 1985

All-Time Balboa Park San Diego/CA Cross Country Championships Record—Girls: Melody Fairchild, 16:39, 1990

== Past results ==
In addition to a national champion being crowned in each gender division, the top 15 finishers in each gender division receive All-American honors and an overall team champion were declared based on which region had won the meet.

National Champions
	Boys						Girls
Year	Athlete	Time	Grade	Region	State	Video	Athlete	Time	Grade	Region	State	Video	Course
2025	Jackson Spencer	15:10.7	12	West	UT	Video on YouTube	Natasza Dudek	16:55.5	10	Midwest	MI	Video on YouTube	San Diego
2024	Tamrat Gavenas	15:23.9	12	Northeast	MA	Video on YouTube	Elizabeth Leachman	17:31.1	11	South	TX	Video on YouTube	San Diego
2023	Drew Griffith	15:06.9	12	Northeast	PA	Video on YouTube	Elizabeth Leachman	16:50.7	10	South	TX	Video on YouTube	San Diego
2022	Kole Mathison	14:56.6	12	Midwest	IN	Video on YouTube	Karrie Baloga	16:49.2	12	Northeast	NY	Video on YouTube	San Diego
2021	Riley Hough	15:11.4	12	Midwest	MI	Video on YouTube	Natalie Cook	17:15.0	12	South	TX	Video on YouTube	San Diego
2019	Josh Methner	15:08.8	12	Midwest	IL	Video on YouTube	Zofia Dudek	16:45.0	12	Midwest	MI	Video on YouTube	San Diego
2018	Cole Hocker	15:13.7	12	Midwest	IN	Video on YouTube	Sydney Masciarelli	17:00.3	10	Northeast	CT	Video on YouTube	San Diego
2017	Dylan Jacobs	15:19	12	Midwest	IL	Video on YouTube	Claudia Lane	17:03	11	West	CA	Video on YouTube	San Diego
2016	Reed Brown	15:01	12	South	TX	Video on YouTube	Claudia Lane	17:04	10	West	CA	Video on YouTube	San Diego
2015	Andrew Hunter	14:55	12	South	VA	Video on YouTube	Weini Kelati	17:09	11	South	VA	Video on YouTube	San Diego
2014	Grant Fisher	15:03	12	Midwest	MI	Video on YouTube	Anna Rohrer	17:13	12	Midwest	IN	Video on YouTube	San Diego
2013	Grant Fisher	15:07	11	Midwest	MI	Video on YouTube	Tessa Barrett	17:16	12	Northeast	PA	Video on YouTube	San Diego
2012	Edward Cheserek	14:59	12	Northeast	NJ	Video on YouTube	Anna Rohrer	17:25	10	Midwest	IN	Video on YouTube	San Diego
2011	Edward Cheserek	14:52	11	Northeast	NJ	Video on YouTube	Molly Seidel	17:22	12	Midwest	WI	Video on YouTube	San Diego
2010	Lukas Verzbicas	14:59	12	Midwest	IL	Video on YouTube	Aisling Cuffe	16:53	12	Northeast	NY	Video on YouTube	San Diego
2009	Lukas Verzbicas	15:08	11	Midwest	IL	Highlights Video on YouTube	Megan Goethals	17:07	12	Midwest	MI	Video on YouTube	San Diego
2008	Solomon Haile	15:15	12	Northeast	MD	Video on YouTube	Jordan Hasay	17:22	12	West	CA	Video on YouTube	San Diego
2007	Michael Fout	14:50	12	Midwest	IN	Video on YouTube	Ashley Brasovan	17:20	11	South	FL	Video on YouTube	San Diego
2006	Chad Hall	15:20	12	West	CA	Video on YouTube	Kathy Kroeger	17:29	10	South	TN	Video on YouTube	San Diego
2005	AJ Acosta	15:02	12	West	CA		Jordan Hasay	17:05	9	West	CA		San Diego
2004	Kenneth Cormier	15:22	12	West	AZ	Video on YouTube	Aislinn Ryan	17:31	11	Northeast	NY	Video on YouTube	San Diego
2003	Matthew Withrow	14:55	12	Midwest	IL		Katelyn Kaltenbach	17:24	11	Midwest	CO		San Diego
2002	Chris Solinsky	14:41	12	Midwest	WI		Zoe Nelson	17:30	10	West	MT		San Diego
2001	Timothy Moore	14:50	12	Midwest	MI		Amber Trotter	16:24	12	West	CA		Orlando
2000	Dathan Ritzenhein	14:35	12	Midwest	MI		Sara Bei	16:55	12	West	CA		Orlando
1999	Dathan Ritzenhein	14:29	11	Midwest	MI		Victoria Chang	17:05	12	West	HI		Orlando
1998	Jorge Torres	15:17	12	Midwest	IL		Erin Sullivan	17:35	12	Northeast	VT		Orlando
1997	Abdirizak Mohamud	15:22	12	Northeast	MA		Erin Sullivan	17:22	11	Northeast	VT		Orlando
1996	Abdirizak Mohamud	15:21	11	Northeast	MA		Kristen Gordon	17:34	12	West	CA		San Diego
1995	Abdul Alzindani	15:11	12	Midwest	MI		Kim Mortensen	17:12	12	West	CA		San Diego
1994	Matt Downin	14:58	12	Northeast	NH		Julia Stamps	16:41	10	West	CA		San Diego
1993	Adam Goucher	14:41	12	Midwest	CO		Erin Davis	17:11	9	Northeast	NY		San Diego
1992	Brendan Heffernan	15:13	12	Northeast	NJ		Amanda White	17:34	12	Northeast	MD		San Diego
1991	Corey Ihmels	15:03	12	Midwest	ND		Liz Mueller	17:21	11	Northeast	CT		San Diego
1990	Louie Quintana	15:07	12	West	CA		Melody Fairchild	16:39	12	Midwest	CO		San Diego
1989	Bryan Dameworth	14:49	12	West	CA		Melody Fairchild	17:05	11	Midwest	CO		San Diego
1988	Brian Grosso	15:03	12	Midwest	MI		Celeste Susnis	17:14	11	Midwest	IN		San Diego
1987	Bob Kennedy	14:59	12	Midwest	OH		Kira Jorgensen	17:08	11	West	CA		San Diego
1986	Marc Davis	14:38	12	West	CA	Video on YouTube	Erin Keogh	16:55	12	South	VA		San Diego
1985	Reuben Reina	14:36	12	South	TX	Video on YouTube	Erin Keogh	16:43	11	South	VA		San Diego
1984	Scott Fry	14:50	12	Midwest	OH		Cathy Schiro	16:48	12	Northeast	NH		San Diego
1983	Matt Giusto	14:54	12	West	CA		Janet Smith	16:43	12	Northeast	NJ		San Diego
1982	Eric Reynolds	14:35	12	West	CA		Christine Curtin	16:58	11	Northeast	NY		Orlando
1981	Charles Alexander	14:51	12	South	VA		Connie Robinson	16:40	12	Midwest	OH		Orlando
1980	Jay Marden	14:53	12	West	CA		Ceci Hopp	17:12	12	Northeast	CT		San Diego
1979	Brent Steiner	15:05	12	Midwest	KS		Ellen Lyons	17:28	12	West	ID		San Diego

== Repeat national champions ==
There have only been a total of six girls and five boys who have repeated as national champions. None have been national champions three times at the XC Championships.

=== Boys with two national championships ===
- Grant Fisher won in 2013 and 2014
- Edward Cheserek won in 2011 and 2012.
- Lukas Verzbicas won in 2009 and 2010.
- Dathan Ritzenhein won in 1999 and 2000.
- Abdirizak Mohamud won in 1996 and 1997.

=== Girls with two national championships ===
- Elizabeth Leachman won in 2023 and 2024
- Claudia Lane won in 2016 and 2017.
- Anna Rohrer won in 2012 and 2014.
- Jordan Hasay won in 2005 and 2008.
- Erin Sullivan won in 1997 and 1998.
- Melody Fairchild won in 1989 and 1990.
- Erin Keogh won in 1985 and 1986.

== National Champions to win NCAA titles ==
There have been a total of sixteen National Champions to win NCAA Titles in Cross Country, Indoor Track and Field, or Outdoor Track and Field, including eleven men and five women.

XC National Champions and NCAA Champions
			NCAA Outdoor					NCAA Indoor
Athlete	XC Championships	NCAA XC	1500	3000	5000	10000	3000SC	Mile	3000	5000	University
Cole Hocker	2018		2021					2021	2021		Oregon
Dylan Jacobs	2017					2022				2023	Notre Dame / Tennessee
Weini Kelati	2015	2019				2019					New Mexico
Grant Fisher	2013, 2014				2017						Stanford
Molly Seidel	2011	2015				2015			2016	2016	Notre Dame
Edward Cheserek	2011, 2012	2013, 2014, 2015			2015	2014, 2015		2015	2014,2016	2014, 2016	Oregon
Jordan Hasay	2005, 2008							2011	2011		Oregon
Chris Solinsky	2002				2006-07				2005-06	2007	Wisconsin
Dathan Ritzenhein	1999, 2000	2003									Colorado
Jorge Torres	1998	2002									Colorado
Adam Goucher	1993	1998			1998				1997-98		Colorado
Melody Fairchild	1989,1990								1996		Oregon
Bob Kennedy	1987	1988, 1992	1990					1991			Indiana
Marc Davis	1986				1989		1992				Arizona
Reuben Reina	1985								1990-91		Arkansas
Matt Giusto	1983				1988						Arizona
Ceci Hopp	1980			1982							Stanford

== Alumni ==
- Jen Rhines
- Deena Kastor (née Drossin)
- Amy Rudolph
- Milena Glusac
- Dathan Ritzenhein
- Alan Webb
- Ryan Hall
- Alan Culpepper
- Chris Derrick
- Adam Goucher
- Kara Goucher (née Wheeler)
- Jordan Hasay
- Galen Rupp
- Sara Slattery (née Gorton)
- Steve Slattery
- Suzy Favor Hamilton
- Lauren Fleshman
- Chris Solinsky
- Molly Huddle
- Sara Hall (née Bei)
- Cheri Goddard-Kenah
- Meb Keflezighi
- Marc Davis
- Billy Nelson (athlete)
- Steve Taylor (runner)

== See also ==
- Gatorade Player of the Year awards § Cross Country
- Champs Sports Bowl (sponsored by a Foot Locker division)
