= Jorge Torres (runner) =

American long-distance and cross-country runner (b.1980)

Personal information
- Born: August 22, 1980 (age 45) Chicago, Illinois, U.S.
- Home town: Boulder, Colorado, U.S.
- Height: 5 ft 6 in (168 cm)
- Weight: 123 lb (56 kg)

Sport
- Country: United States
- Sport: Athletics, long-distance running
- Event(s): 5000 meters, 10,000 meters, marathon
- College team: Colorado
- Coached by: Mark Wetmore; Brad Hudson

Achievements and titles
- Personal best(s): 1500 meters: 3:41.29; Mile: 4:02.62; 3000 meters: 7:52.15; 5000 meters: 13:20.57; 10,000 meters: 27:42.91; Marathon: 2:13:00

Jorge Torres (born August 22, 1980 in Chicago, Illinois) is an American long-distance and cross-country runner. He is a three-time runner-up at the U.S. Cross-Country Championships (2005, 2006, and 2008), a 2002 NCAA Cross Country Champion, and a 2006 U.S. Outdoor Champion for the 10,000 meters.

== Running career ==
=== Early career ===
Born and raised in Chicago, Illinois by Mexican immigrants, Torres began running with his twin brother Eduardo at the age of eleven. He attended Wheeling High School in Wheeling, Illinois. He won the cross-country race at the 1998 Foot Locker National Championships in Orlando, Florida, and added three more titles in his category from numerous state high school tournaments. Jorge is one of only two boys ever to run in four Foot Locker Cross Country Championships.

=== Collegiate ===
Four years later, Torres captured his first ever national title at the 2002 NCAA Men's Division I Cross Country Championship in Terre Haute, Indiana, with a course record time of 29:04.70.

=== Post-collegiate ===
Torres graduated from University of Colorado in the spring of 2003. By the summer of 2003, Torres placed third in the 5,000 meters at the USA Outdoor Track and Field Championships, and followed it with a fifteenth-place finish at the IAAF World Championships in Paris, France, clocking at 13:43.37.

Although he missed out the U.S. Olympic team in 2004, Torres continued to build success and more importantly, improved his best possible marks in the long-distance and cross-country running. He highlighted his 2005 track campaign by posting a personal best time of 13:20.57 in the 5,000 meters at the Payton Jordan U.S. Open in Palo Alto, California. He also enjoyed a strong cross-country season by winning a silver medal in the men's 12 km race at the U.S. national championships, and by placing fourth in the 4 km race.

Torres found a new success in long-distance running by winning the 10,000 meters at the 2006 AT&T USA Outdoor Championships in Indianapolis, Indiana, with a personal best time of 28:14.43, four seconds ahead of runner-up and Olympic silver medalist Meb Keflezighi (28:18.74). On April 29, 2007, Torres extended his personal best to 27:42.91, when he finished fifth in the same distance at the Cardinal Invitational in Palo Alto.

The following year, Torres and his twin brother Eduardo competed against each other at the USA Track & Field Cross Country Championships in Mission Bay, San Diego, California. He finished the men's race in second place by twenty-six seconds behind winner Dathan Ritzenhein, with a time of 35 minutes and 31 seconds. His brother Eduardo, on the other hand, placed ninth, at approximately 36 minutes. Torres qualified for the 2008 IAAF World Cross Country Championships in Edinburgh, Scotland, where he placed nineteenth in the men's race, with a time of 36:03.

Torres earned a spot on the U.S. team for his first Olympics, by placing third in the 10,000 meters at the U.S. Olympic Trials in Eugene, Oregon, with a time of 27:46.33. Eduardo also qualified for the same distance as his twin brother, but finished the race abruptly in eleventh place.

At the 2008 Summer Olympics in Beijing, Torres competed as a member of U.S. track and field team in the men's 10,000 meters, along with his teammates Abdi Abdirahman and Galen Rupp. He finished the race in twenty-fifth place by four hundredths of a second (0.04) ahead of India's Surendra Kumar Singh, with a time of 28:13.93.

A year after the Olympics, Torres began his transition of becoming a marathon runner. He ran his first half-marathon at the Great North Run in London, with an impressive time of 1:02:42. Few weeks later, Torres made his official debut in a full distance, and set a personal best time of 2:13:00 at the 2009 New York Marathon, finishing in seventh place.

In 2022, Torres was selected to be the team captain for the Midwest team at the 2022 Champs Sports Cross Country National Championships (Previously the Eastbay Cross Country Championships, and prior to that it was the Foot Locker Cross Country Championships). While he did not run, the Midwest team won the meet with 18 points, 43 points ahead of the second team, Northwest.

== Personal bests ==
Event	Best	Venue	Year	Notes
1500 meters	3:41.29	Eugene, Oregon, United States	June 19, 2004	
1 mile	4:02.62	Walnut, California, United States	April 21, 2002	
3000 meters	7:52.15	Helsinki, Finland	August 18, 2003	
5000 meters	13:20.57	Palo Alto, California, United States	May 29, 2005	
10,000 meters	27:42.91	Palo Alto, California, United States	April 29, 2007	
Marathon	2:13:00	New York, New York, United States	November 1, 2009	

- All information taken from IAAF profile.

== Achievement chronology ==
- 1994 - IESA Illinois Cross country champion (9:52 2 miles). This was a course record until it was broken in 2017 by Fiker Rosen. Jorge was an 8th grader.
- 1995 - IHSA Illinois Cross country runner up (freshman) 14:37; 13th at Footlocker Nationals 15:38
- 1996 - IHSA Illinois Cross country state champion (sophomore) 14:29; 5th at Footlocker Nationals 15:38
- 1997 - IHSA Illinois Cross country state champion (junior) 14:15; 2nd at Footlocker Nationals 15:33
- 1998 - IHSA Illinois Cross Country state champion (senior) 14:00; Footlocker National Champion 15:16
- 1999 - NCAA D1 championships (freshman) 47th place 31:26; 8th at Nationals for 5k 14:04
- 2000 - NCAA D1 championships (sophomore) 3rd place 30:21; 5th at Nationals for 5k 13:57
- 2001 - NCAA D1 championships (junior) 2nd place 29:06 (team champion as part of Colorado); 2nd at Nationals for 5k 13:59
- 2002 - NCAA D1 championships (senior) 1st place 29:04; 9th at Nationals for 1500 3:44
- 2008 - IAAF World Cross Country Championships (Men's Senior Race) - 19th place; 36:03 (12 km)
- 2008 - Olympics, Beijing - 25th place in 10k 28:13
