= Kim Mortensen =

American runner

Kimberly Mortensen (born 27 March 1978) is the girl's individual winner of the 1995 Footlocker Cross Country Championships and a former national high school record holder in the 3200-meter run. In December of 1995, Mortensen capped off a successful senior cross-country season by winning the Foot Locker Cross Country Championships 5K in 17:12:4 at Balboa Park in San Diego, California. On May 24, 1996, she ran 9:48.59 in the 3200-meter race for the California CIF-Southern Sections Masters track and field meet, run at Cerritos College in Norwalk, California. Her performance, in the qualifying meet for the California Interscholastic Federation State Championships capped an exceptional senior year at Thousand Oaks High School. She was the third athlete from suburban Ventura County to be named both the Gatorade Player of the Year and the Track and Field News High School Athlete of the Year, a list that includes one-time teammate Marion Jones. Following her national high school record breaking race, she went on to win the California State Championship race a week later in 9:52.80. Her then California State Championship record time of 9:52:80 was superseded by Jordan Hasay and Laurynne Chetelat's exceptional battle in the 2008 version of that same meet. Mortensen's national high school 3200 meter record time was eventually broken 22 years later by Katelyn Tuohy's 9:47:88 in May of 2018.

Mortensen continued to UCLA but her athletic career was cut short by injuries.

Mortensen is now a learning specialist at Oaks Christian High School Kim Mortensen is married to Justin Newman and they have three children. They both work at Oaks Christian School. Kim is a middle school Learning Specialist and her husband, Justin, is a US history teacher for 8th grade.
