= Kirubel Erassa =

American runner

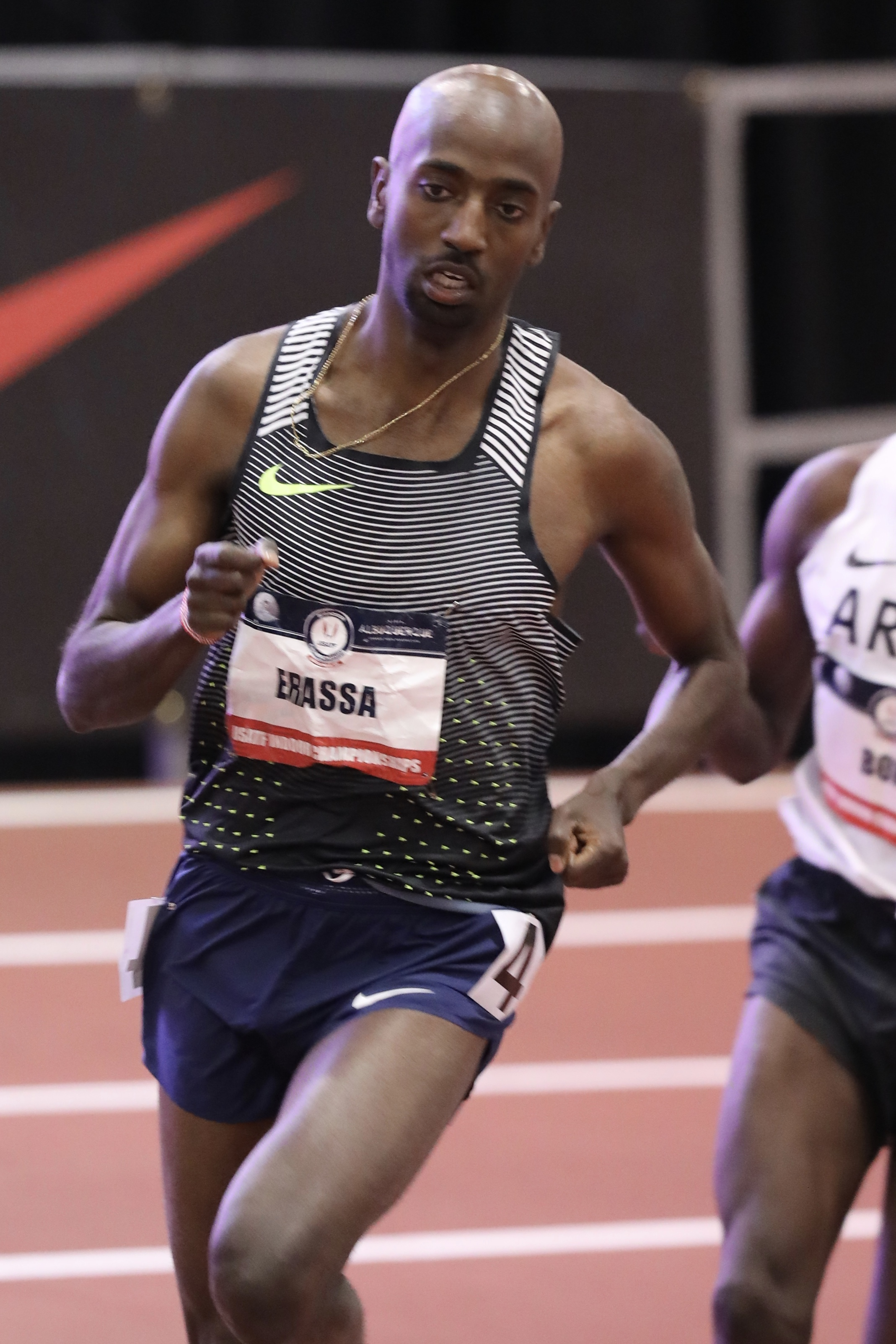
- Kirubel at the 2018 USATF Indoor Championships

Personal information
- Nationality: United States
- Born: June 17, 1993 (age 33) Ethiopia

Sport
- Sport: Track
- Events: 1500 meters, mile, 5000 meters
- College team: Oklahoma State University
- Club: Atlanta Track Club since 11/2015
- Turned pro: 2015

Achievements and titles
- Personal bests: 1500 meters: 3:38.26 Mile: 3:57.86; 5000 meters: 13:17.23; 10,000 meters: 27:32.86
Medal record
Men's athletics
Representing the United States
IAAF Bupa Great Edinburgh Cross Country International Challenge
Gold medal – first place	2012Edinburgh	Cross Country

Kirubel Erassa (born June 17, 1993) is an Ethiopian-born American middle- and long-distance runner. Kirubel was a silver medalist in 3000 meters at the 2014 NCAA Division I Indoor Track and Field Championships and seven-time All-American in NCAA Division I track and field.

== Early life ==
Erassa attended Grayson High School and was a national elite high school runner there. He earned spot on the 2009 Foot Locker Cross Country Championships team. He also ran in the 2010 adidas Jim Ryun Boys Dream Mile at the New York Diamond League in June. At the 2010 Nike Indoor Nationals, Erassa placed first in the 5000 meters and was runner-up in the mile run.

In his junior year, Erassa earned the Georgia AAAAA state championship in 1600 metres and competed at the Nike Outdoor Nationals. He took the Georgia AAAAA state championship in cross country and 1600 metres as a senior, as well as being the 3200 metres runner-up.

== Oklahoma State University ==
=== Track and field ===
In his first year in collegiate track and field he placed third in the mile at the Big 12 Conference indoor championships and ninth in the 3000 m. At the regional outdoor championships he was only tenth in the 5000 m, but managed fourth in the 1500 meters.

He won the Big 12 Conference outdoor championship in the 5000 m in his second year and also was the 3000 m runner-up at that level. He gained NCAA All-American honours in the indoor mile and outdoor 5000 m (ninth place) that year.

He placed in the top three of all his events at Big 12 Conference championship in his junior year. Indoors he was runner-up in the mile and third in the 3000 m, then outdoors he took second place in the 1500 m and third in the 5000 m. At the NCAA championships he was sixth in the distance medley relay, third over 3000 m and 18th in the 5000 m.

In his final year at Oklahoma state he took a clean sweep of Big 12 Conference titles, including the mile, 3000 m and 5000 m indoors and a 5000/10,000 meters double outdoors. In his last appearance at the NCAA Men's Division I Outdoor Track and Field Championships Kirubel was the 3000 m runner-up and also earned All American honours in the distance medley relay.

Year	Competition	Venue	Position	Event	Notes
2011	Big 12 Conference Track and Field Indoor Championships	Nebraska-Devaney Center Lincoln, Nebraska	3rd	Mile	4:08.79
2011	Big 12 Conference Track and Field Indoor Championships	Nebraska-Devaney Center Lincoln, Nebraska	9th	3000 metres	8:14.51
2012	Big 12 Conference Track and Field Indoor Championships	Texas A&M Gilliam Indoor Track Stadium College Station, Texas	2nd	3000 metres	8:02.98
2012	Big 12 Conference Track and Field Indoor Championships	Texas A&M University Gilliam Indoor Track Stadium College Station, Texas	8th	Mile	4:07.35
2012	NCAA Division I Track and Field Indoor Championships	Boise State University Jackson's Track Nampa, Idaho	10th	Mile	4:04.36
2012	Big 12 Conference Track and Field Outdoor Championships	Kansas State University RV Christian Track Manhattan, Kansas	10th	5000 metres	14:17.67
2012	Big 12 Conference Track and Field Outdoor Championships	Kansas State University RV Christian Track Manhattan, Kansas	4th	1500 metres	3:43.99
2013	Big 12 Conference Track and Field Indoor Championships	Iowa State University Leid Rec Center Ames, Iowa	3rd	3000 metres	8:04.54
2013	Big 12 Conference Track and Field Indoor Championships	Iowa State University Leid Rec Center Ames, Iowa	2nd	Mile	4:02.02
2013	NCAA Division I Track and Field Indoor Championships	University of Arkansas Randall Tyson Track Fayetteville, Arkansas	6th	Distance Medley Relay	9:35.55
2013	NCAA Division I Track and Field Indoor Championships	University of Arkansas Randall Tyson Track Fayetteville, Arkansas	3rd	3000 meters	7:49.17
2013	Big 12 Conference Track and Field Outdoor Championships	Waco Hart-Patterson Track Waco, Texas	1st	5000 metres	13:53.53
2013	NCAA Division I Track and Field Outdoor Championships	Hayward Field Eugene, Oregon	9th	5000 metres	14:00.31
2014	Big 12 Conference Track and Field Indoor Championships	Iowa State University Leid Rec Center Ames, Iowa	1st	Mile	4:15.94
2014	Big 12 Conference Track and Field Indoor Championships	Iowa State University Leid Rec Center Ames, Iowa	1st	3000 metres	7:53.53
2014	Big 12 Conference Track and Field Indoor Championships	Iowa State University Leid Rec Center Ames, Iowa	1st	5000 metres	14:11.29
2014	NCAA Division I Track and Field Indoor Championships	Albuquerque Convention Center Albuquerque, New Mexico	12th	Distance Medley Relay	10:01.56
2014	NCAA Division I Track and Field Indoor Championships	Albuquerque Convention Center Albuquerque, New Mexico	2nd	3000 meters	8:13.08
2014	Big 12 Conference Track and Field Outdoor Championships	Texas Tech University Lubbock, Texas	3rd	5000 metres	14:46.51
2014	Big 12 Conference Track and Field Outdoor Championships	Texas Tech University Lubbock, Texas	2nd	1500 metres	3:55.01
2014	NCAA Division I Track and Field Outdoor Championships	Hayward Field Eugene, Oregon	18th	5000 meters	14:12.98
2015	Big 12 Conference Track and Field Outdoor Championships	Iowa State University Ames, Iowa	1st	5000 metres	14:24.98
2015	Big 12 Conference Track and Field Outdoor Championships	Iowa State University Ames, Iowa	1st	10,000 metres	28:50.41
2015	NCAA Division I Track and Field Outdoor Championships	Hayward Field Eugene, Oregon	DNF	5000 meters	DNF

=== Cross country ===
In his freshman year at Oklahoma state he placed seventh in the Big 12 Conference cross country, then improved to second place the following year, in which Oklahoma State Cowboys took the team title. His 102nd place finish at the 2012 NCAA Men's Division I Cross Country Championship also helped his school to the NCAA team title. He was the winner of the Big 12 Conference race in his third year.

Year	Competition	Venue	Position	Event	Notes
2012	Big 12 Conference Cross Country Championships	Austin, Texas	7th	8000 metres	24:06
2012	2012 NCAA Men's Division I Cross Country Championship	E.P. Tom Sawyer State Park Louisville, Kentucky	102nd	10,000 metres	30:44.7
2013	Big 12 Conference Cross Country Championships	Waco, Texas	2nd	8000 metres	22:53.9
2013	2013 NCAA Division I Cross Country Championships	Indiana State University Terre Haute, Indiana	83rd	10,000 metres	31:10.1
2014	Big 12 Conference Cross Country Championships	Rim Rock Farm Lawrence, Kansas	1st	8000 metres	24:08.2
2014	2014 NCAA Division I Cross Country Championships	Indiana State University Terre Haute, Indiana	69th	10,000 metres	31:15.6

== International ==
=== 2012 ===
He was named USA Track & Field’s Athlete of the Week on 11 January 2012 as a result of his victory in the junior men’s 6 km race at the Great Edinburgh International Cross Country. He was the only American individual winner and led the American junior men to a team title.

=== 2016 ===
Kirubel Erassa placed 26th at the 2016 Great Edinburgh International Cross Country Senior 8 km race. Erassa ran 4:04.5 placed 7th on the road at the 2016 Grandma's Minnesota Mile on September 11th.

=== USA National Championships ===
Year	Competition	Venue	Position	Event	Notes
2012	Junior USA Outdoor Track and Field Championships	Eugene, Oregon	1st	5000 metres	14:28.00
2015	USA Outdoor Track and Field Championships	Eugene, Oregon	DNS	1500 metres	
2015	USA Club Cross Country Championships	San Francisco, California	7th	10,000 metres	29:38
2016	USATF National Club Cross Country Championships	Tallahassee, Florida	41st	10,000 metres	30:23
