= Running with the Buffaloes =

Book by Chris Lear

- Author: Chris Lear
- Language: English
- Genre: Non-fiction
- Publisher: The Lyons Press
- Publication date: 2003
- Publication place: United States
- ISBN: 1-58574-328-3

Running With The Buffaloes, written by Chris Lear and published by The Lyons Press (ISBN 1-58574-328-3), chronicles the University of Colorado cross country team's 1998 season from the late summer practices to the men's NCAA cross country championships.

== Description ==
The book centers on the University of Colorado's men's cross country team. Most of the story, however, is focused on coach Mark Wetmore, risk-taker Chris Severy, and Adam Goucher, the team's top runner and one of the best cross-country runners in the nation. The story is written in a journal fashion, each chapter representing a different entry. Each entry discusses the team's run for the day. Lear also includes information about Wetmore's training methods, based on those of Arthur Lydiard.

Since the 1998 season, the Buffaloes have won the men's NCAA Division I cross country championship five times.

== Author Interviews ==
- Podcast Interview with Chris Lear: Author of "Running with the Buffaloes" (Part 1 of 2)
- Podcast Interview with Chris Lear: Author of "Running with the Buffaloes" (Part 2 of 2)
