= Erin Clark (runner) =

American-born distance runner

Personal information
- Nationality: United States
- Born: December 28, 1994 (age 31) Eugene, Oregon
- Height: 1.65 m (5 ft 5 in)
- Website: Northern Arizona Elite profile

Sport
- Country: United States
- Sport: Track and field, Road racing, Cross country
- Event(s): 5 km, 10 km, 3000 metres steeplechase, Cross country
- College team: Colorado Buffaloes women's cross country
- Team: Hoka One One; Northern Arizona Elite; 2018 - 19; Nike Trail; 2021 - Present
- Turned pro: 2018
- Coached by: Ben Rosario

Achievements and titles
- Personal best(s): 3000 meters: 9:05.72; 3000 meters steeplechase: 9:48.72; 5000 meters: 15:30.59; 10,000 meters:32:28.88
Medal record
Women's athletics
Representing the USA

Erin Clark (born December 28, 1994) is an American-born distance runner.

== Career ==
In August 2018, Erin Clark moved to Flagstaff, Arizona to train under coach Ben Rosario at Northern Arizona Elite. Clark now trains in Montana, as a professional runner for Nike.

Year	Competition	Venue	Position	Event	Notes
2023	Lake Sonoma 50	Lake Sonoma	1st place	50 mile	7:49:27
USATF Championships
2019	2019 USA Outdoor Track and Field Championships	Drake University	10th place	10000 metres	33:16.16
2018	USATF National Club Cross Country Championships	Spokane, Washington	12th place	6 km	20:04
2018	Abbott Dash to the Finish 5k/USATF 5 km Road Championship	New York, New York	9th place	5 km	16:07
2018	2018 USA Outdoor Track and Field Championships	Drake University	9th place	5000 metres	15:54.17
2016	2016 United States Olympic Trials (track and field)	University of Oregon	23rd place	steeplechase	10:00.85
2011	2011 USA Junior Track and Field Championships	University of Oregon	9th place	3000 metres	10:07.29

== NCAA ==
As a student-athlete for the Colorado Buffaloes, Clark was a 13-time NCAA Division I All-American, 3-time Pac-12 Conference champion and 2-time Mountain Pacific Sports Federation champion. Erin just completed her master's degree in Education and has a bachelor's degree in Biology from CU.

Representing University of Colorado
School Year	Pac-12 Cross Country	NCAA Cross Country	MPSF Indoor Track	NCAA Indoor Track	Pac 12 Outdoor Track	NCAA Outdoor Track
2017-18 Senior			3000 2nd 9:05.72	3000 m 13th 9:21.07; 5000 6th 15:56.97	5000 m 3rd 16:30.70; 10,000 m 3rd 33:14.58	5000 m 13th, 15:51.80; 10000 m 9th, 33:20.46
2016-17 Junior	6000 m 2nd 20:23.3	6000 m 133rd, 20:58.4	5000 m 1st, 15:50.96	3000 m 8th 9:13.56	5000 m 8th 16:16.31; 10,000 m 1st 33:23.92	5000 m 16th 16:04.91; 10,000 m 5th 33:03.22
2015-16 Sophomore	6000 m 4th, 19:58.6	6000 m 11th, 20:05.4	3000 m 1st 9:08.29	3000 m 5th 9:08.63	5000 m 2nd 16:13.46; 3000S 1st 9:48.72	3000 S 16th 10:12.31
2014-15 Freshman	6000 m 4th, 20:18.1	6000 m 31st 20:37.7		3000 m 5th 9:19.60	5000 m 2nd 16:06.37; 3000 S 1st 10:02.16	3000 S 15th, 10:15.83
2013-14	6000 m 13th 21:59.0	6000 m 97th 21:17.7				

== Early life and prep ==
Clark grew up playing soccer, swim, water polo, and winters participating in downhill ski.

Clark's aunt competed for the Oregon Ducks in track and field and later introduced Erin Clark to track and field in middle school as her co-coach with Erin's mother.

Erin graduated from South Eugene High School as a 2-time OSAA state champion.

South Eugene High School's Erin Clark 4:31.4, Phacelia Cramer 4:56.3, Paige Kouba 4:37.5, Sara Tsai 4:38.7 set a United States high school national record in track and field in the 4 × 1500 m relay in a time of 18:42.33 June 10, 2012 at Portland Track Festival.

Representing South Eugene High School at Oregon School Activities Association 6A state championship
Year	Cross Country	Outdoor Track
2012-13	6th 18:08	2nd in the 1500 m (4:30.39)
2012-13	6th 18:08	1st in the 3000 m (9:32.08)
2011-12	3rd 18:17.0	3rd in the 1500 m (4:33.39)
2011-12	3rd 18:17.0	2nd in the 3000 m (9:51.51)
2010-11	8th 19:00.0	3rd in the 1500 m (4:44.69)
2010-11	8th 19:00.0	1st in the 3000 m (10:06.63)
2009-10	35th 20:03.0	12th in the 1500 m (5:00.06)
2009-10	35th 20:03.0	10th in the 3000 m (10:41.15)

In 2013, Clark placed 2nd in the 1500 m (4:30.39) at Oregon School Activities Association 6A state meet after winning the district meet (4:29.42) - Clark placed 1st in the 3000 m (9:32.08) at Oregon School Activities Association 6A state meet after winning the district meet (9:37.91). Clark won 2011 Southwest Conference xc title (18:15).

In 2012, Clark placed 3rd in the 1500 m (4:33.39) and 2nd in the 3000 m (9:51.51) at Oregon School Activities Association 6A state meet.

In 2011, Clark placed 3rd in the 1500 m (4:44.69) and 1st in the 3000 m (10:06.63) at Oregon School Activities Association 6A state meet.

In 2010, Clark placed 12th in the 1500 m (5:00.06) and 10th in the 3000 m (10:41.15) at Oregon School Activities Association 6A state meet.

== Personal life ==
Erin lives with her fiancé, Adam Peterman in Missoula, Montana. The two met in college while attending and running for the University of Colorado Boulder.
