= 1945 NCAA track and field championships =

1945 NCAA Track and Field Championships
- Team Champion: Navy (1st title)
- Edition: 24th
- Date: June 9, 1945
- Host city: Milwaukee, Wisconsin
- Venue: Marquette Stadium

The 1945 NCAA Track and Field Championships were contested at the 24th annual NCAA-hosted track meet to determine the team and individual national champions of men's collegiate track and field events in the United States. For the second straight year, this meet events were hosted by Marquette University at Marquette Stadium in Milwaukee, Wisconsin.

As World War II was still ongoing, many of the athletes were Navy personnel and not allowed more than 48 hours away from school. To combat this, the meet was held in one day as opposed to the usual two, similar to the 1944 meet. Prelims were in the morning and finals were at night. However, unlike the previous year there was no longer a travel restriction, allowing all schools to participate.

Navy captured the team championship, their first title.

== Team result ==
- Note: Top 10 finishers only
- (H) = Hosts

Rank	Team	Points
1st place, gold medalist(s)	Navy	62
2nd place, silver medalist(s)	Michigan	52 3/5
3rd place, bronze medalist(s)	Illinois	48 4/5
4	Missouri	42
5	Notre Dame	26
6	Drake	22
7	Miami (OH); Western Michigan	18
8	Utah	15
9	Marquette (H)	14
10	Fresno State	13

== See also ==
- NCAA Men's Outdoor Track and Field Championship
- 1945 NCAA Men's Cross Country Championships
