= Sara Slattery =

American middle- and long-distance runner (born 1981)

Personal information
- Born: October 2, 1981 (age 44) Phoenix, Arizona, United States

Sport
- Sport: Track and field
- Club: Colorado Buffaloes
Medal record
Women's athletics
Representing the United States
Pan American Games
Gold medal – first place	2007 Rio de Janeiro	10,000 m

Sara Elizabeth Slattery (née Gorton; born October 2, 1981) is an American middle- and long-distance runner who mainly competes in track races. Slattery has represented the United States at the IAAF World Cross Country Championships at both junior and senior level.

She was a two-time NCAA champion while competing for the Colorado Buffaloes, first taking the indoor title over 5000 meters in 2003 then the 10,000 meters outdoor title in 2005. In 2007, she won the 10,000 m at the Pan American Games, setting a Games record time. The following year she was the USA champion over 8 km and just missed an Olympic spot in the 5000 m after a fourth-place finish at the Olympic Trials in 2008.

In 2013, Sara began racing on the ElliptiGO elliptical bicycle, winning the 2013 ElliptiGO World Championships race up Palomar Mountain in San Diego County.

She is married to Steve Slattery, a steeplechase runner and works at the University of Colorado, where she earned her Master's degree in education.

== Career ==
=== High school ===
Born in Phoenix, Arizona, she took up running as a high school athlete at Mountain Pointe High School and had her first successes at the Foot Locker Cross Country Championships, where she was the runner-up at the state-level event in 1997 and 1998 before going on to win the title in 1999. She was chosen for the United States junior team at the 1999 IAAF World Cross Country Championships and in her first international outing she placed 73rd overall. Later that year she ran in the 3000 meters at the 1999 Pan American Junior Athletics Championships and beat Madai Pérez to win the title.

=== Colorado Buffaloes ===
She graduated in 2000 and began studying economics at the University of Colorado. In her first year of collegiate competition, she came second at the Rocky Mountain Shootout cross country race, third at Big 12 Championships, then placed eighth at the 2000 NCAA Women's Cross Country Championship to become the first freshman to win All-American honours at Colorado. Her performance as helped Colorado take the women's team title.

She competed at the USA Cross Country Championships and was ninth in the short race. In her first indoor track season for Colorado, she ran a university record for the indoor mile run at the Nebraska Quadrangular meet. At the Big 12 indoor track and field championships she won the mile title and was runner-up over the 3000 meters. A sixth-place finish in the mile at the NCAA Women's Indoor Track and Field Championship brought her further All-America honours. A bout of mononucleosis ruled her out of competition for the rest of the year.

In 2002, she came tenth in the NCAA Cross Country meet then was eighth in the 4 km race at the USA event. At the Big 12 Indoor event she broke the championship record with her winning run of 4:40.35 minutes in the mile and managed second in the 3000 m. At the NCAA indoors she came seventh in the mile run. Turning to the outdoor track season, she broke the meet record at the Big 12 Championships, taking the 5000 meters title in a time of 16:11.83 minutes. Following a personal record run of 15:51.55 minutes at the Cardinal Invitational, she competed at the NCAA Outdoor Championships and came fourth in the 5000 m.

Slattery did not compete in the 2003 cross country season, choosing to focus on the track instead. She doubled in the 3000 m and 5000 m events at the Big 12 indoor championship and won both titles. At the 2003 NCAA Indoors she came third in the 3000 m then ran a championship record time of 15:39.25 minutes in the 5000 m, winning her first NCAA title in the process. The outdoor Big 12 meet saw her win the 5000 m title and finish runner-up over 1500 meters. She competed over the longer distance at the NCAA Outdoors and reached the podium with a third-place finish. She finished her economics degree that year, being named in the Academic All-Big 12 Conference list, and carried on into post-graduate study at Colorado on its Masters of Education course. She helped Colorado to the NCAA Cross Country team title, but did not compete for the rest of that year. She married fellow Colorado athlete Steve Slattery, a steeplechase specialist, in January 2004.

Slattery's second NCAA title came outdoors in 2005, where she took first place in the 10,000 meters with a time of 33:02.21 minutes (which ranked 8th nationally that year). She graduated later that year and ended her collegiate career having won 10 All-America honours, two individual NCAA titles. She set school records for the 1500 m, mile run, and 3000 m indoors and the 5000 m outdoors.

=== Professional career ===
The 2006 season was Slattery's first as a professional athlete. She came third in the 3000 m at the USA Indoor Track and Field Championships. That year she improved three personal bests, running 8:58.09 minutes for the 3000 m, 15:08.32 minutes for the 5000 m and 31:57.94 minutes for the 10,000 m. She was fourth in the long race at the National Cross Country event and was then selected for the 2006 IAAF World Cross Country Championships, where she came 26th. A few months later she came second in the 10,000 m at the USA Outdoor Track and Field Championships and won Colorado's Bolder Boulder 10K road race. The winter of 2006 Slattery was injured with a stress fracture from falling on the ice while training in Boulder. She claims that the injury allowed her to be fitter later in the season, which helped her performance at the 2007 Pan American Games. Although she only placed eighth in the 10,000 m at the 2007 USA Outdoors, she was chosen for the event at the 2007 Pan American Games in Rio de Janeiro. She won her first international gold medal at the competition and her time of 32:54.11 minutes was a Pan American Games record.

Her 2008 season was a mix of track and road competitions. She won the national road title over 8 km, was third at the Great Yorkshire Run 10K, and placed fourth at the Carlsbad 5000. At the United States Olympic Trials she ran in both the 5000 m and 10,000 m events. However, she did not make the Olympic team, coming fourth and seventh respectively. She had a 3000 m season's best run of 9:00.25 minutes at the London Grand Prix and was eleventh in that event at the 2008 IAAF World Athletics Final.

Slattery did not compete in 2009 and took on an assistant position for the Colorado Buffaloes at her alma mater in January 2010. She continued to race occasionally, including a 10K win at the Bermuda Race Weekend, where her husband was also runner-up in the men's section.

A few weeks before the Olympic Trials in the summer of 2012, Slattery tore her hamstring and was not able to compete in the trials, summer track, or the summer and fall road races. It took her most of the summer to recover and rehab from this injury. As of the fall of 2012, she has been focusing on building up her mileage.

In June 2015, Sara gave birth and has been working to get back into shape for Olympic trials. She participated in a New York Times profile in July 2015 describing how she was hired to race against a competitive runner in NYC as a birthday gift.

== Personal bests ==
Event	Time (m:s)	Venue	Date
1500 m	4:14.14	Palo Alto, CA	May 2003
Mile run (indoor)	4:40.35	?	2002
3000 m	8:58.09	Carson, California	May 2006
5000 m	15:08.32	Paris	July 2006
10,000 m	31:57.94	Helsinki	July 2006

- All information taken from IAAF profile.

== International competition record ==
Year	Competition	Venue	Position	Event	Notes
1999	World Cross Country Championships	Belfast, Northern Ireland	73rd	Junior race	
2006	World Cross Country Championships	Fukuoka, Japan	26th	Long race	
2007	Pan American Games	Rio de Janeiro, Brazil	1st	10,000 m	32:54.11 GR
2008	World Athletics Final	Stuttgart, Germany	11th	3000 m	

== Coaching ==
Rob Brink hired Sara in summer 2015.

"I am thrilled to be the new cross country and distance coach at GCU," said Slattery. "With the move to Division I athletics, it is a very exciting time to be a part of Grand Canyon University athletics. With great weather and amazing trails to train on, Phoenix is an optimal place to train for distance runners. I look forward to building a competitive program." "I am thrilled to announce the hiring of Sara Slattery as our new head cross country coach at Grand Canyon University!" said head track and field coach Tom Flood. "I had a very short list of coaching candidates and Sara was right at the top. She is a true champion in her own right and has competed for one of the top distance programs in the country. I feel she has the perfect background to make an immediate impact on our programs and will lead our GCU distance programs to national success." (8/18/2015)
