= Adam Goucher =

American cross-country and track and field athlete

Personal information
- Nationality: American
- Born: February 18, 1975 (age 51)

Sport
- Sport: Track
- Events: 1500 meters, 3000 meters, 5000 meters, 10,000 meters
- College team: Colorado

Achievements and titles
- Personal bests: 1500 meters: 3:36.64; Mile: 3:54.17; 3000 meters: 7:34.96; 5000 meters: 13:10.00; 10,000 meters: 27:59.31

Adam Goucher (born February 18, 1975) is a retired American cross-country and track and field athlete. He ran for the United States at the 2000 Summer Olympics in the men's 5000 meters. Goucher primarily competed in distance events and is featured in Running With The Buffaloes, a book revolving around the 1998 season of the University of Colorado cross country team.

== Running career ==
=== High school ===
Goucher attended Doherty High School in Colorado Springs, Colorado and graduated in 1994. Before he ran competitively in high school, he played basketball. He won the Foot Locker National High School Cross Country Championship in 1993, as well as having personal bests of 1:53 at 800 m, 4:18 at 1600 m, and 8:55 at 3200 m. Goucher's coach in high school was Judy Fellhauer, who was an Olympic Trials qualifier in the marathon.

=== Collegiate ===
While attending the University of Colorado, Goucher won two NCAA indoor track titles in the 3,000 meter race (1997 & 1998) and an outdoor NCAA track title in 5,000 meters in 1998. After three top ten finishes, he finally won the NCAA Division I cross country title his senior year in 1998. It is during this season in which Running With The Buffaloes is written. He also competed in the United States Olympic Trials in 1996 and placed 14th in the 5000 m.

=== Professional ===
After graduating, Goucher continued to compete with a contract from Fila, running the fastest time for an American in 1999 in the mile (3:54.17), the sixth fastest for 3,000 meters (7:43.31), and third fastest for 5,000 meters (13:11.25). On consecutive days in February 2000 he won both the short (4K) and long course (12K) races at the USATF National Cross Country Championships under cold, muddy conditions in North Carolina. During 2000, he also made his first Olympic team, placing first in the Olympic Trials in the 5000 m. He was 13th in the 5000 m at the Sydney Olympic Games, despite serious battles with back troubles.

Goucher's career has been plagued with injury. Despite having continually been ranked as one of the foremost American competitors at distances between 1500 m and 5000 m, he was prevented from performing optimally at the 2004 Olympic Trials by an Achilles heel problem and thus did not qualify for the Olympic team. The Olympic Trials were a culmination of a very rough period for him and soon thereafter he left Mark Wetmore, his longtime coach and friend, to train with Alberto Salazar in Oregon.

The move proved beneficial for Goucher. Goucher's 2005 season saw him improve his 5000 m time to 13:10.19 and take 2nd place at the USA Cross Country 4 km Championships.

In 2006, Goucher ran a 10:50 at the USA Cross Country Championships to win first place in the short course (4 km). He went on to finish 6th in the short course race at the IAAF World Cross Country Championships in Fukuoka, Japan, the highest finish by an American since Pat Porter placed 6th in the 1986 World Cross (12K) Championships. He finished only 8 seconds behind the winner, world-renowned Ethiopian champion Kenenisa Bekele, the 5k and 10k world record holder. At the 2006 Prefontaine Classic, Goucher finished third in the 2 mile with a time of 8:12.7, the third fastest 2 mile ever run by an American.

Goucher's performance at the World Cross Country meet and his 2 mile at the Prefontaine Classic were the highlights of a year that also saw him dipping under 28 minutes for the 10,000 meters with a 27:59.41 at the Van Damme Memorial Meet in Brussels, Belgium.

In 2008, he took part in the US Olympic Trials in Eugene, Oregon with hopes of qualifying in the 5k and 10k. His time of 13:56.25 in the semifinal of the 5k was enough to advance to the finals, but after holding the lead for several laps, he dropped out of the race with two laps remaining. He withdrew from the race because he was at a point that he would not be able to run the Olympic A standard if he were to continue with the race. This was done to conserve energy for the 10k. He finished seventh in the 10k final, failing to qualify for the Olympics, but besting his previous 10k personal record by less than a second with a 27:59.31.

Goucher is co-founder of Run The Edge, a virtual fitness challenge company.

== Personal bests (outdoor) ==
Distance	Mark	Date	Location
800 meters	1:50.03	May 11, 2002	Modesto, CA
1500 metres	3:36.64	July 17, 2001	Stockholm
Mile	3:54.17	May 30, 1999	Eugene, OR
3000 metres	7:34.96	July 20, 2001	Monaco
2 miles	8:12.73	May 28, 2006	Eugene, OR
5000 metres	13:10.00	July 22, 2006	Heusden-Zolder
10000 meters	27:59.31	July 4, 2008	Eugene, OR
