= Darrin Plab =

American high jumper (born 1970)

Darrin Plab (born September 26, 1970) is a retired American high jumper. Born in Belleville, Illinois, he competed at the 1992 Olympic Games without reaching the final.

Plab attended Mascoutah High School and Southern Illinois University Carbondale. His personal best jump is 2.35 metres, achieved in June 1992 in New Orleans.
