= Mark Wetmore =

American cross country and track coach (born 1953)

- Born: June 29, 1953 (age 72); Bernardsville, New Jersey, U.S.
- Occupations: University of Colorado cross country and track coach

Mark Wetmore (born June 29, 1953) is an American cross country and track coach who specializes in middle-distance and long-distance running. He began his collegiate coaching career when he was accepted as a volunteer assistant coach at the University of Colorado in 1992. Since then he became one of the most successful and longest-serving coaches of any collegiate program in the United States. In June 2023, it was confirmed that Wetmore's contract with University of Colorado would not be renewed, ending his longstanding career at the school.

== Coaching career ==
Wetmore first began coaching in the 1970s in his hometown, Bernardsville, New Jersey, when he was offered to be the municipal children's team coach. He eventually named the team "Edge City Track Club" in 1972, after being inspired by Tom Wolfe's book The Electric Kool-Aid Acid Test, which discusses the hippie counterculture and living on the periphery of existence. Eventually, the group expanded, when Wetmore began coaching the children's parents in running. Eventually the group expanded so much that it included runners aged from 8 to 60. The group became colloquially known as the Mine Mt. Road Department. Subsequently, he was offered a summer position at his own former school, Bernards High School, as an assistant cross country coach, along with his own former coach Ed Mather. He spent fourteen years coaching at Bernards High before getting his first collegiate coaching offer.

=== Collegiate coaching ===
In 1988, Wetmore was hired to his first college coaching position at Seton Hall University, where he spent four years. In 1992, Wetmore moved to Colorado, where he was hired as men's distance coach at University of Colorado. In 1995, Wetmore accepted an additional duty to coach the women's distance team at University of Colorado. In 1998, former Princeton runner Chris Lear documented Colorado's cross country season under Wetmore's coaching and later published his work in his book, Running with the Buffaloes.
