= Billy Nelson (runner) =

American steeplechase runner

Personal information
- Full name: William Andrew Nelson
- Nickname: Billy
- Nationality: United States
- Born: September 11, 1984 (age 41) Bakersfield, California, U.S.
- Home town: Boulder, Colorado, U.S.
- Height: 5 ft 5 in (1.65 m)
- Weight: 121 lb (55 kg)

Sport
- Country: USA
- Sport: Track and field
- Event: 3000 metres steeplechase
- College team: Colorado
- Coached by: Mark Wetmore & Heather Burroughs

Achievements and titles
- Personal best: 1500 m: 3:41.57 (2012) 3000 m steeplechase: 8:17.27 (2011)

William Andrew Nelson (born September 11, 1984, in Bakersfield, California) is an American steeplechase runner. He competed in the 2008 Summer Olympics and 2011 World Athletics Championships, and won the national title in 2011.

Nelson is a two-time (2007 and 2008) Big 12 Conference steeplechase titleholder, a six-time NCAA All-American, and a runner-up at the 2008 NCAA Outdoor Championships. He also posted a personal best time of 8:17.27 by finishing eleventh at the 2011 Diamond League Meet in Monaco. In the same year, Nelson claimed his first ever career title at the U.S. Outdoor Track & Field Championships, with a time of 8:28.46.

Nelson earned a spot on the U.S. team for the 2008 Summer Olympics in Beijing, by placing second at the U.S. Olympic Trials in Eugene, Oregon, with a time of 8:21.47. He competed as a member of the U.S. track and field team in the men's 3000 m steeplechase, along with his teammates Anthony Famiglietti and Joshua McAdams. Nelson ran in the second heat against thirteen other athletes, including Famiglietti, and France's Mahiedine Mekhissi-Benabbad, who later won the silver medal in the final. He finished the race in eleventh place by six tenths of a second (0.60) behind Great Britain's Andrew Lemoncello, with a time of 8:36.66. Nelson, however, failed to advance into the final, as he placed thirtieth overall, and was ranked farther below four mandatory slots for the next round.

Nelson earned a spot on the U.S. team for the 2011 World Championships in Daegu, South Korea, by winning the steeplechase event at the U.S. Track & Field Championships.

Nelson also sought to qualify for his second Olympics in London; however, he finished only in eighth place at the 2012 U.S. Olympic Trials, with a time of 8:32.21.

In 2014, Nelson decided to take his participation in Track & Field to the next level, by running for the freedom of Leonard Peltier. He ran in a "Free Leonard Peltier" jersey in four races, including the Payton Jordan Invitational, where he won the steeplechase in a time of 8:28.40. He also wore the jersey at the USA Championships in Sacramento, CA, where he placed 12th overall.

Nelson currently resides in Boulder, Colorado, with his wife Alisa, and four children: Arabella Kennedy, Noah Andrew, Lonnie Jack and Wyatt Watkins. He works as an assistant coach and recruiting coordinator for the Cross Country/Track & Field programs at the University of Colorado at Boulder.
