= 5000 meters at the NCAA Division I Outdoor Track and Field Championships =

This is a list of the NCAA Division I outdoor champions in the 5000 meters or its imperial equivalent 3 mile run. The imperial distance was contested until 1975, except during Olympic years starting in 1932. Metrication occurred in 1976, so all subsequent championships were at the metric distance. Hand timing was used until 1973, while starting in 1974 fully automatic timing was used. The women's race has been contested since 1982.

== Women ==
Key
A=Altitude assisted

Year	Name	Nationality	Team	Time
1982	Kathy Bryant	United States	Tennessee	16:10.41
1983	Betty Springs	United States	North Carolina St	15:51.97
1984	PattiSue Plumer	United States	Stanford	15:39.38
1985	Sabrina Dornhoefer	United States	Missouri	15:42.22
1986	Stephanie Herbst	United States	Wisconsin	15:42.36
1987	Anne Schweitzer	United States	Texas	15:46.00
1988	Annette Hand	United States	Oregon	15:38.47
1989	Valerie McGovern	Ireland	Kentucky	16:17.20A
1990	Valerie McGovern	Ireland	Kentucky	15:45.72
1991	Laurie Gomez	United States	North Carolina St	16:07.96
1992	Monique Ecker	United States	Oklahoma	16:18.72
1993	Kay Gooch	New Zealand	Oklahoma	16:31.02
1994	Jennifer Rhines	United States	Villanova	16:21.60
1995	Jennifer Rhines	United States	Villanova	15:56.18
1996	Jennifer Rhines	United States	Villanova	16:05.85
1997	Amy Skieresz	United States	Arizona	15:46.76
1998	Amy Skieresz	United States	Arizona	15:37.77
1999	Carrie Tollefson	United States	Villanova	16:09.51
2000	Kara Wheeler	United States	Colorado	15:54.30
2001	Lauren Fleshman	United States	Stanford	15:52.11
2002	Lauren Fleshman	United States	Stanford	15:43.91
2003	Lauren Fleshman	United States	Stanford	15:24.06
2004	Kim Smith	New Zealand	Providence	15:48.86
2005	Megan Metcalfe	Canada	West Virginia	16:31.88
2006	Mary Cullen	Ireland	Providence	16:01.39
2007	Michelle Sikes	United States	Wake Forest	15:16.76
2008	Sally Kipyego	Kenya	Texas Tech	15:15.08
2009	Angela Bizzarri	United States	Illinois	16:17.94
2010	Lisa Koll	United States	Iowa State	15:23.80
2011	Sheila Reid	Canada	Villanova	15:37.57
2012	Abbey D'Agostino	United States	Dartmouth	16:11.34
2013	Abbey D'Agostino	United States	Dartmouth	15:43.26
2014	Marielle Hall	United States	Texas	15:35.11
2015	Emily Sisson	United States	Providence	15:34.10
2016	Dominique Scott	South Africa	Arkansas	15:57.07
2017	Karissa Schweizer	United States	Missouri	15:38.93
2018	Karissa Schweizer	United States	Missouri	15:41.58
2019	Dani Jones	United States	Colorado	15:50.65
2021	Elly Henes	United States	North Carolina State	15:28.05
2022	Katelyn Tuohy	United States	North Carolina State	15:18.39
2023	Parker Valby	United States	Florida	15:30.57
2024	Parker Valby	United States	Florida	14:52:18
2025	Pamela Kosgei	Kenya	New Mexico	15:33:96
2026	Marion Jepngetich	Kenya	New Mexico	15:13.01

== Men ==
Key
y=yards
A=Altitude affected

Year	Name, (Country)	Team	Time
1936	Don Lash	Indiana	14:58.5
1948	Jerry Thompson	Texas	15:04.5
1952	Wes Santee	Kansas	14:36.3
1956	Bill Dellinger	Oregon	14:48.5
1959	Paul Whiteley	Emporia St	13:59.0y
1960	Al Lawrence Australia	Houston	14:19.8
1961	Pat Clohessy Australia	Houston	13:47.7y
1962	Pat Clohessy Australia	Houston	13:51.6y
1963	Julio Marín Costa Rica	Southern Cal	14:24.9Ay
1964	Jim Murphy	Air Force	14:12.3 (tie)
1964	Bill Straub	Army	14:12.3 (tie)
1965	Doug Brown	Montana	13:40.2y
1966	Gerry Lindgren	Wash St	13:33.7y
1967	Gerry Lindgren	Wash St	13:47.8Ay
1968	Gerry Lindgren	Wash St	13:47.2
1969	Ole Oleson	Southern Cal	13:42.0y
1970	Steve Prefontaine	Oregon	13:22.0y
1971	Steve Prefontaine	Oregon	13:20.1y
1972	Steve Prefontaine	Oregon	13:31.4
1973	Steve Prefontaine	Oregon	13:05.3y
1974	Paul Geis	Oregon	13:38.89y
1975	John Ngeno Kenya	Wash St	13:22.73Ay
1976	Joshua Kimeto Kenya	Wash St	13:47.8
1977	Joshua Kimeto Kenya	Wash St	13:38.1
1978	Rudy Chapa	Oregon	13:35.3
1979	Sydney Maree South Africa	Villanova	13:20.6
1980	Suleiman Nyambui Tanzania	UTEP	13:44.4
1981	Suleiman Nyambui Tanzania	UTEP	13:38.8
1982	Suleiman Nyambui Tanzania	UTEP	13:54.09A
1983	Gidamis Shahanga Tanzania	UTEP	13:54.1
1984	Julius Korir Kenya	Wash St	13:47.8
1985	Ed Eyestone	Brigham Y	13:56.7
1986	Terry Brahm	Indiana	13:56.6
1987	Dean Crowe New Zealand	Boston	13:43.3
1988	Matt Giusto	Arizona	13:55.9
1989	Marc Davis	Arizona	14:07.88A
1990	John Trautmann	Georgetown	14:07.5
1991	Shannon Butler	Montana St	13:41.6
1992	Jon Dennis United Kingdom	South Florida	14:02.4
1993	Jon Dennis United Kingdom	South Florida	13:59.0
1994	Brian Baker	Arkansas	14:22.1
1995	Martin Keino Kenya	Arizona	14:36.8
1996	Alan Culpepper	Colorado	13:47.3
1997	Mebrahtom Keflezighi Eritrea	UCLA	13:44.2
1998	Adam Goucher	Colorado	13:31.6
1999	Bernard Lagat Kenya	Wash St	14:01.1
2000	Brad Hauser	Stanford	13:48.8
2001	Jonathon Riley	Stanford	13:42.5
2002	David Kimani Kenya	South Alabama	13:59.3
2003	Alistair Cragg Ireland	Arkansas	13:47.9
2004	Robert Cheseret Kenya	Arizona	13:49.9
2005	Ryan Hall	Stanford	13:22.3
2006	Chris Solinsky	Wisconsin	14:11.7
2008	Bobby Curtis	Villanova	13:33.93
2009	Galen Rupp	Oregon	14:04.12
2010	David McNeill Australia	Northern Arizona	13:44.81
2011	Sam Chelanga	Liberty	13:29.30
2012	Cameron Levins Canada	Southern Utah	13:40.05
2013	Lawi Lalang Kenya	Arizona	13:35.19
2014	Lawi Lalang Kenya	Arizona	13:18.36
2015	Edward Cheserek Kenya	Oregon	13:48.67
2016	Edward Cheserek	Oregon	13:25.59
2017	Grant Fisher	Stanford	14:35.60
2018	Sean McGorty	Stanford	13:54.81
2019	Morgan McDonald Australia	Wisconsin	14:06.01
2020	[not held]		
2021	Cooper Teare	Oregon	13:12.27
2022	Olin Hacker	Wisconsin	13:27.73
2023	Ky Robinson (AUS)	Stanford	14:04.77
2024	Parker Wolfe (USA)	North Carolina	13:54.43
2025	Brian Musau (KEN)	Oklahoma State	13:20.59
2026	Habtom Samuel (ERI)	New Mexico	13.38.93
