= 1943 NCAA Track and Field Championships =

American collegiate athletics championship event

- Team Champion: USC (12th title)
- Edition: 22nd
- Dates: June 11-12, 1943
- Host city: Evanston, Illinois; Northwestern University
- Venue: Dyche Stadium

The 1943 NCAA Track and Field Championships were contested at the 22nd annual NCAA-hosted track meet to determine the team and individual national champions of men's collegiate track and field events in the United States. This year's events were held at Dyche Stadium at Northwestern University in Evanston, Illinois.

USC captured their twelfth overall, as well as ninth consecutive, team championship.

== Team result ==
- Note: Top 10 finishers only

Rank	Team	Points
1st place, gold medalist(s)	USC	46
2nd place, silver medalist(s)	California	39
3rd place, bronze medalist(s)	Rice	36
4	NYU	32
5	Minnesota	31
6	Nebraska	19
7	Illinois	18
8	Washington	17
9	Lawrence; Michigan; Texas	16
10	Michigan State	14

== See also ==
- NCAA Men's Outdoor Track and Field Championship
- 1942 NCAA Men's Cross Country Championships
