= 1961 NCAA track and field championships =

1961 NCAA Track and Field Championships
- Team Champion: USC (21st title)
- Edition: 40th
- Dates: June 16−17, 1961
- Host city: Philadelphia, Pennsylvania; University of Pennsylvania
- Venue: Franklin Field

The 1961 NCAA Track and Field Championships were contested June 16−17 at the 40th annual NCAA-sanctioned track meet to determine the individual and team national champions of men's collegiate track and field events in the United States. This year's meet was hosted by the University of Pennsylvania at historic Franklin Field in Philadelphia.

USC claimed the team national championship, the Trojans' 21st team title.

== Team Result ==
- Note: Top 10 only
- (H) = Hosts

Rank	Team	Points
1st place, gold medalist(s)	USC	65
2nd place, silver medalist(s)	Oregon	47
3rd place, bronze medalist(s)	Villanova	40
4	San José State	20 4/5
5	Western Michigan	19 1/4
6	Abilene Christian; Michigan	18
7	Occidental	15
8	Arizona	14
9	Cal Poly−San Luis Obispo	13 1/4
10	Harvard; UCLA	13

== See also ==
- NCAA Men's Outdoor Track and Field Championship
- 1960 NCAA University Division Cross Country Championships
