= 1944 NCAA track and field championships =

1944 NCAA Track and Field Championships
- Team Champion: Illinois (12th title)
- Edition: 23rd
- Date: June 10, 1944
- Host city: Milwaukee, Wisconsin
- Venue: Marquette Stadium

The 1944 NCAA Track and Field Championships were contested at the 23rd annual NCAA-hosted track meet to determine the team and individual national champions of men's collegiate track and field events in the United States. This year's events were hosted by Marquette University at Marquette Stadium in Milwaukee, Wisconsin.

Due to World War II, this meet was held in one day as opposed to the usual two since many of the athletes were members of the Navy and not allowed more than 48 hours away from school. Prelims were in the morning and finals were at night. There was also a travel restriction in the United States, preventing any schools from the Pacific Coast Conference, Southeastern Conference or Southwest Conference from competing. This meant all competitors represented schools from the Midwest and Northeast, dramatically decreasing the level of competition.

Illinois captured their third team championship (and first since 1927).

== Team result ==
- Note: Top 10 finishers only
- (H) = Hosts

Rank	Team	Points
1st place, gold medalist(s)	Illinois	79
2nd place, silver medalist(s)	Notre Dame	43
3rd place, bronze medalist(s)	Michigan	40
4	Ohio State	23
5	Morgan State; Northwestern; Purdue	20
6	Marquette (H)	19
7	Missouri; NYU	18
8	Miami (OH); Wisconsin	16
9	Oberlin	15
10	Utah	14

== See also ==
- NCAA Men's Outdoor Track and Field Championship
