= Tulsa Golden Hurricane track and field =

College track and field team

- University: University of Tulsa
- Head coach: Taylor Gulley; Steve Gulley
- Conference: The American
- Location: Tulsa, Oklahoma
- Outdoor track: Hurricane Soccer & Track Stadium
- Nickname: Golden Hurricane
- Colors: Old gold, royal blue, and crimson

The Tulsa Golden Hurricane track and field team is the track and field program that represents University of Tulsa. The Golden Hurricane compete in NCAA Division I as a member of the American Conference. The team is based in Tulsa, Oklahoma at the Hurricane Soccer & Track Stadium.

The program is coached by Taylor Gulley and Steve Gulley. The track and field program officially encompasses four teams, as the NCAA regards men's and women's indoor track and field and outdoor track and field as separate sports.

The team is particularly accomplished in men's distance running, with Chris O'Hare, Marc Scott, and Patrick Dever having won NCAA championship titles in the mile run and 10,000 m.

== Postseason ==
As of 2024, a total of 10 men and 3 women have achieved individual first-team All-American status at the men's outdoor, women's outdoor, men's indoor, or women's indoor national championships.

First team All-Americans
Team	Championships	Name	Event	Place	Ref.
Men's	1964 Outdoor	Bob Daugherty	Triple jump	6th	
Men's	2000 Indoor	Dwight Davis	Mile run	5th	
Women's	2001 Outdoor	Fride Vullum	5000 meters	6th	
Women's	2001 Outdoor	Charlotte Sanderson	10,000 meters	7th	
Women's	2007 Indoor	Alex Becker	3000 meters	7th	
Men's	2009 Indoor	Mark Davidson	Mile run	8th	
Women's	2010 Indoor	Alex Becker	5000 meters	5th	
Men's	2011 Indoor	Chris O'Hare	Mile run	2nd	
Men's	2012 Indoor	Chris O'Hare	Mile run	1st	
Men's	2012 Outdoor	Carl Stones	3000 meters steeplechase	8th	
Men's	2013 Indoor	Bryce Robinson	60 meters	6th	
Men's	2013 Indoor	Chris O'Hare	Mile run	7th	
Men's	2015 Indoor	Bryce Robinson	200 meters	3rd	
Men's	2015 Indoor	Marc Scott	5000 meters	5th	
Men's	2016 Indoor	Bryce Robinson	60 meters	8th	
Men's	2017 Indoor	Marc Scott	3000 meters	3rd	
Men's	2017 Indoor	Marc Scott	5000 meters	2nd	
Men's	2017 Outdoor	Marc Scott	5000 meters	4th	
Men's	2017 Outdoor	Marc Scott	10,000 meters	1st	
Men's	2017 Outdoor	Luke Traynor	10,000 meters	8th	
Men's	2021 Outdoor	Patrick Dever	5000 meters	6th	
Men's	2021 Outdoor	Patrick Dever	10,000 meters	1st	
Men's	2022 Outdoor	Micheal Power	5000 meters	6th	

== See also ==
- Category:Tulsa Golden Hurricane men's track and field athletes (12)
- Category:Tulsa Golden Hurricane women's track and field athletes (5)
