= 2021 NCAA Division I Outdoor Track and Field Championships =

College track and field competition

- Edition: 99th (Men); 39th (Women)
- Dates: June 9–12, 2021
- Host city: Eugene, Oregon; University of Oregon
- Venue: Hayward Field
- Events: 42 (21 men's and 21 women's)

The 2021 NCAA Division I Outdoor Track and Field Championships was the 99th NCAA Division I Men's Outdoor Track and Field Championships and the 39th NCAA Division I Women's Outdoor Track and Field Championships held at the reconstructed Hayward Field in Eugene, Oregon on the campus of the University of Oregon. 42 events (21 men's and 21 women's) were contested from Wednesday, June 9 until Saturday, June 12, starting with the men's decathlon and ending with the women's 4 × 400-meter relay. Men's events were held Wednesday and Friday, and women's events were held Thursday and Saturday, with the exception of the men's decathlon and women's heptathlon which extended into Thursday and Friday respectively.

== Streaming and television coverage ==
ESPN live streamed on ESPN2, ESPN3, and ESPNU.

== Results ==
=== Men ===
==== 100 meters ====
Wind: +0.4 m/s

Rank	Athlete	Team	Time	Notes
1st place, gold medalist(s)	Terrance Laird (USA)	Louisiana State	10.05	PB
2nd place, silver medalist(s)	Shaun Maswanganyi (RSA)	Houston	10.09	
3rd place, bronze medalist(s)	Micah Williams (USA)	Oregon	10.11	
4	Jo'Vaughn Martin (USA)	Florida State	10.12	
5	Davonte Burnett (JAM)	USC	10.182	
6	Matthew Boling (USA)	Georgia	10.186	
7	Joseph Fahnbulleh (LBR)	Florida	10.26	
8	Taylor Banks (USA)	Florida State	10.35	
—	Joseph Amoah (GHA)	Coppin State	—	DNS

- Results from Flash Results.

==== 200 meters ====
Wind: -0.4 m/s

Rank	Athlete	Team	Time	Notes
1st place, gold medalist(s)	Joseph Fahnbulleh (LBR)	Florida	19.91	PB
2nd place, silver medalist(s)	Terrance Laird (USA)	Louisiana State	19.94	
3rd place, bronze medalist(s)	Shaun Maswanganyi (RSA)	Houston	20.10	PB
4	Micaiah Harris (USA)	Texas	20.26	
5	Matthew Boling (USA)	Georgia	20.48	
6	Davonte Burnett (JAM)	USC	20.55	
7	JoVaughn Martin (USA)	Florida State	20.96	
8	Robert Gregory (USA)	Texas Christian	21.74	
9	Javonte Harding (USA)	North Carolina A&T	25.79	

- Results from Flash Results.

==== 400 meters ====
Rank	Athlete	Team	Time	Notes
1st place, gold medalist(s)	Randolph Ross (USA)	North Carolina A&T	43.85	WL PB
2nd place, silver medalist(s)	Bryce Deadmon (USA)	Texas A&M	44.44	PB
3rd place, bronze medalist(s)	Noah Williams (USA)	Louisiana State	44.93	
4	Trevor Stewart (USA)	North Carolina A&T	44.96	
5	Dwight St. Hillaire (TTO)	Kentucky	45.20	
6	Ryan Willie (USA)	Florida Gators	45.36	
7	Tyler Johnson (USA)	Ohio State	45.40	
8	Michael Bluth (USA)	Brigham Young	45.91	
—	Sean Bailey (JAM)	UTEP	—	DNF

- Results from Flash Results.

==== 800 meters ====
Rank	Athlete	Team	Time	Notes
1st place, gold medalist(s)	Isaiah Jewett (USA)	Southern California	1:44.68	PB CL
2nd place, silver medalist(s)	Brandon Miller (USA)	Texas A&M	1:44.97	PB
3rd place, bronze medalist(s)	Charlie Hunter (AUS)	Oregon	1:45.75	PB
4	Finley McLear (GBR)	Miami (Ohio)	1:45.80	PB
5	Festus Lagat (KEN)	Iowa State	1:46.33	
6	Shane Streich (USA)	Lipscomb	1:46.70	PB
7	Yusuf Bizimana (GBR)	Texas	1:46.571	PB
8	Eric Brown (USA)	Auburn	1:46.573	PB
9	Crayton Carrozza (USA)	Texas	1:46.94	PB

- Results from Flash Results.

==== 1500 meters ====
Rank	Athlete	Team	Time	Notes
1st place, gold medalist(s)	Cole Hocker (USA)	Oregon	3:35.35	PB
2nd place, silver medalist(s)	Yared Nuguse (USA)	Notre Dame	3:35.60	
3rd place, bronze medalist(s)	Waleed Suliman (USA)	Ole Miss	3:37.30	
4	Eliud Kipsang (KEN)	Alabama	3:38.18	
5	Mario García Romo (ESP)	Ole Miss	3:38.66	
6	Jack Salisbury (USA)	Georgetown	3:40.06	
7	Diego Zarate (USA)	Virginia Tech	3:40.12	
8	Paul Ryan (USA)	Washington State	3:40.50	
9	Talem Franco (USA)	Brigham Young	3:40.61	
10	Sam Tanner (NZL)	Washington	3:41.78	
11	AJ Ernst (USA)	Providence	3:43.14	
12	Isaac Basten (USA)	Drake	3:46.12	

- Results from Flash Results.

==== 5000 meters ====
Rank	Athlete	Team	Time	Notes
1st place, gold medalist(s)	Cooper Teare (USA)	Oregon	13:12.27	PB CL MR
2nd place, silver medalist(s)	Luis Grijalva (GTM)	Northern Arizona	13:13.14	PB
3rd place, bronze medalist(s)	Athanas Kioko (KEN)	Campbell	13:13.47	PB
4	Cole Hocker (USA)	Oregon	13:18.95	PB
5	Robert Brandt (USA)	Georgetown	13:19.11	PB
6	Patrick Dever (GBR)	Tulsa	13:19.85	PB
7	Thomas Ratcliffe (USA)	North Carolina	13:20.88	PB
8	Morgan Beadlescomb (USA)	Michigan State	13:21.40	PB
9	Ian Shanklin (USA)	NC State	13:23.48	PB
10	Alex Masai (KEN)	Hofstra	13:24.68	PB
11	Dylan Jacobs (USA)	Notre Dame	13:25.65	PB
12	Isaac Green (USA)	Washington	13:27.26	PB
13	Wesley Kiptoo (KEN)	Iowa State	13:30.87	
14	Eric Hamer (USA)	Colorado State	13:31.27	PB
15	Charles Hicks (GBR)	Stanford	13:33.89	PB
16	Casey Clinger (USA)	BYU	13:34.56	
17	James Mwaura (USA)	Gonzaga	13:36.43	
18	Conor Lundy (USA)	North Carolina	13:39.67	PB
19	Olin Hacker (USA)	Wisconsin	13:44.53	
20	Vincent Kiprop (KEN)	Alabama	13:46.42	
21	Amon Kemboi (KEN)	Arkansas	13:46.44	
22	Euan Makepeace (GBR)	Butler	13:56.48	
23	Zach Facioni (AUS)	Wake Forest	13:58.26	
24	Ben Veatch (USA)	Indiana	14:09.60	

- Results from Flash Results.

==== 10000 meters ====
Rank	Athlete	Team	Time	Notes
1st place, gold medalist(s)	(United Kingdom) Patrick Dever	Tulsa	27:41.87	MR PB
2nd place, silver medalist(s)	(United States) Conner Mantz	BYU	27:42.46	
3rd place, bronze medalist(s)	(United States) Abdihamid Nur	Northern Arizona	27:42.73	PB
4	(United States) Robert Brandt	Georgetown	27:43.17	PB
5	(United States) Eric Hamer	Colorado State	27:44.87	PB
6	(Kenya) Alex Masai	Hofstra	27:45.19	PB
7	(United Kingdom) Charles Hicks	Stanford	27:47.63	PB
8	(South Africa) Adriaan Wildschutt	Florida State	27:48.89	PB
9	(United States) James Mwaura	Gonzaga	27:50.44	PB
10	(United States) Isai Rodriguez	Oklahoma State	27:52.92	PB
11	(Kenya) Wesley Kiptoo	Iowa State	28:03.65	
12	(United States) John Dressel	Colorado	28:03.87	PB
13	(Kenya) Gilbert Boit	Arkansas	28:09.11	PB
14	(Kenya) Vincent Kiprop	Alabama	28:19.12	
15	(Republic of Ireland) Barry Keane	Butler	28:28.18	PB
16	(Republic of Ireland) Jack O'Leary	Iona	28:29.39	PB
17	(Germany) Aaron Bienenfeld	Cincinnati	28:33.05	
18	(United States) Marcelo Rocha	Providence	28:37.05	PB
19	(Australia) Haftu Strintzos	Villanova	28:51.06	PB
20	(United States) Christopher Alfond	UMass Lowell	29:23.55	
21	(United States) JP Trojan	Syracuse	29:24.08	
22	(Kenya) Victor Shitsama	Oklahoma State	29:32.28	
23	(United States) Nickolas Scudder	Charlotte	29:40.46	
—	(Kenya) Edwin Kurgat	Iowa State	—	DNF

Results from Flash Results.

==== 110-meter hurdles ====
Wind: -0.6 m/s

Rank	Athlete	Team	Time	Notes
1st place, gold medalist(s)	Robert Dunning (USA)	Alabama	13.25	
2nd place, silver medalist(s)	Jaylan McConico (USA)	Iowa	13.38	
3rd place, bronze medalist(s)	Phillip Lemonious (JAM)	Arkansas	13.39	PB
4	Jamal Britt (USA)	Iowa	13.45	PB
5	Jamar Marshall (USA)	Arizona State	13.53	
6	Tade Ojora (GBR)	Southern California	13.57	PB
7	Giano Roberts (JAM)	Clemson	13.65	
8	Damion Thomas (JAM)	Louisiana State	13.76	
9	Tai Brown (USA)	Kentucky	13.89	

- Results from Flash Results.

==== 400-meter hurdles ====
Rank	Athlete	Team	Time	Notes
1st place, gold medalist(s)	Sean Burrell (USA)	Louisiana State	47.85	PB CL WJR
2nd place, silver medalist(s)	Isaiah Levingston (USA)	Oklahoma	48.49	PB
3rd place, bronze medalist(s)	Cameron Samuel (USA)	Southern California	48.68	PB
4	Moitalel Mpoke (KEN)	Texas A&M	48.70	PB
5	Malik Metivier (CAN)	Auburn	49.26	PB
6	Leonardo Ledgister (JAM)	Texas A&M-CC	49.28	
7	Jonathan Harvey (USA)	Oregon	49.64	PB
8	Charles Brockman (USA)	Texas	49.92	
9	Quivell Jordan (USA)	Houston	50.54	

- Results from Flash Results.

==== 3000-meter steeplechase ====
Rank	Athlete	Team	Time	Notes
1st place, gold medalist(s)	Kigen Chemadi (KEN)	Mid. Tenn. State	8:28.20	PB CL
2nd place, silver medalist(s)	Alec Basten (USA)	Minnesota	8:29.03	PB
3rd place, bronze medalist(s)	Ryan Smeeton (CAN)	Oklahoma State	8:30.70	
4	Garrett Marsing (USA)	Brigham Young	8:31.54	PB
5	Duncan Hamilton (USA)	Montana State	8:31.55	PB
6	Ky Robinson (AUS)	Stanford	8:32.01	PB
7	Derek Johnson (USA)	Virginia	8:32.95	PB
8	Parker Stokes (USA)	Georgetown	8:33.44	
9	Felix Kandie (KEN)	Liberty	8:34.15	
10	Ahmed Jaziri (TUN)	Eastern Kentucky	8:34.85	
11	Bennett Pascoe (USA)	Arkansas State	8:42.37	
12	Colton Johnsen (USA)	Washington State	8:46.89	

- Results from Flash Results.

==== 4 × 100-meter relay ====
Rank	Team	Time	Notes
1st place, gold medalist(s)	Louisiana State	38.48	CL
2nd place, silver medalist(s)	Georgia	38.54	
3rd place, bronze medalist(s)	Florida State	38.592	
4	North Carolina A&T	38.597	
5	Clemson	38.96	
6	Texas	39.122	
7	Texas A&M	39.130	
8	Houston	42.87	
—	Texas Tech	—	DNF

Results from Flash Results.

==== 4 × 400-meter relay ====
Rank	Team	Time	Notes
1st place, gold medalist(s)	North Carolina A&T	3:00.92	
2nd place, silver medalist(s)	Stephen F. Austin	3:01.52	
3rd place, bronze medalist(s)	Texas A&M	3:01.64	
4	Southern California	3:02.49	
5	Iowa	3:02.54	
6	Arizona	3:03.58	
7	Florida	3:03.60	
8	Kentucky	3:03.63	
9	Baylor	3:05.14	

- Results from Flash Results.

==== Long jump ====
Rank	Athlete	Team	Mark	Wind (m/s)	Notes
1st place, gold medalist(s)	JuVaughn Harrison (USA)	Louisiana State	8.27 m (27 ft 1 1/2 in)	+1.9	
2nd place, silver medalist(s)	Isaac Grimes (USA)	Florida State	8.05 m (26 ft 4 3/4 in)	+0.4	
3rd place, bronze medalist(s)	Carey McLeod (JAM)	Tennessee	7.94 m (26 ft 1/2 in)	+0.2	
4	Brandon Hicklin (USA)	North Carolina A&T	7.91 m (25 ft 11 1/4 in)	+1.9	PB
5	Steffin McCarter (USA)	Texas	7.84 m (25 ft 8 1/2 in)	-0.2	
6	Harrison Schrage (USA)	UCLA	7.83 m (25 ft 8 1/4 in)	+0.7	
7	Rayvon Grey (USA)	Louisiana State	7.78 m (25 ft 6 1/4 in)	+1.1	
8	Rayvon Allen (USA)	Oklahoma	7.69 m (25 ft 2 3/4 in)	+0.6	
9	Jason Smith (USA)	Long Beach State	7.68 m (25 ft 2 1/4 in)	+1.2	
10	James Carter Jr. (USA)	Iowa	7.65 m (25 ft 1 in)	+2.4	w
11	Allen Gordon (USA)	Ole Miss	7.64 m (25 ft 3/4 in)	+1.9	
12	A'Nan Bridgett (USA)	Rutgers	7.58 m (24 ft 10 1/4 in)	+1.1	
13	Cameron Crump (USA)	Mississippi State	7.53 m (24 ft 8 1/4 in)	+1.3	
14	O'Brien Wasome (JAM)	Texas	7.49 m (24 ft 6 3/4 in)	-0.2	
15	Jonathan Wells (USA)	Illinois	7.46 m (24 ft 5 1/2 in)	+1.6	
16	Ronnie Briscoe (USA)	Texas State	7.46 m (24 ft 5 1/2 in)	+1.9	
17	Safir Scott (USA)	Connecticut	7.40 m (24 ft 3 1/4 in)	+0.7	
18	Jullane Walker (JAM)	Kansas State	7.34 m (24 ft 3/4 in)	+1.5	
19	Kenneth Pree (USA)	Texas Southern	7.33 m (24 ft 1/2 in)	+0.3	
20	Michael Hoffer (USA)	Nebraska	7.28 m (23 ft 10 1/2 in)	+0.6	
21	David Ejumeta (NGR)	Coastal Carolina	7.27 m (23 ft 10 in)	+0.2	
22	Anthony Riley (USA)	Tennessee	7.22 m (23 ft 8 1/4 in)	+2.6	w
23	Benjamin Okafor (USA)	Houston	7.18 m (23 ft 6 1/2 in)	+1.1	
24	Trey Causey (USA)	Kentucky	6.92 m (22 ft 8 1/4 in)	+0.5	

Results from Flash Results.

==== Triple jump ====
Rank	Athlete	Team	Mark	Wind (m/s)	Notes
1st place, gold medalist(s)	Emmanuel Ihemeje (ITA)	Oregon	17.14 m (56 ft 2 3/4 in)	+1.8	PB CL
2nd place, silver medalist(s)	Jah-Nhai Perinchief (BMU)	Tennessee	17.03 m (55 ft 10 1/4 in)	+1.2	PB
3rd place, bronze medalist(s)	Chengetayi Mapaya (ZIM)	TCU	16.74 m (54 ft 11 in)	+0.1	
4	Sean Dixon-Bodie (USA)	LSU	16.61 m (54 ft 5 3/4 in)	+0.7	PB
5	Clayton Brown (JAM)	Florida	16.56 m (54 ft 3 3/4 in)	-0.4	PB
6	Isaiah Griffith (USA)	Oregon	16.54 m (54 ft 3 in)	+0.3	
7	Carey McLeod (JAM)	Tennessee	16.40 m (53 ft 9 1/2 in)	+1.6	PB
8	O'Brien Wasome (JAM)	Texas	16.35 m (53 ft 7 1/2 in)	+1.0	
9	Georgi Nachev (BUL)	Missouri	16.24 m (53 ft 3 1/4 in)	+0.8	
10	Jalen Seals (USA)	Texas Tech	16.17 m (53 ft 1/2 in)	+1.1	PB
11	Christian Edwards (USA)	Alabama	16.15 m (52 ft 11 3/4 in)	-0.2	
12	Jordan Scott (JAM)	USC	15.95 m (52 ft 3 3/4 in)	-0.5	
13	Tamar Greene (BAH)	Purdue	15.85 m (52 ft 0 in)	-0.5	
14	R'Lazon Brumfield (USA)	Tennessee State	15.79 m (51 ft 9 1/2 in)	+0.3	
15	Owayne Owens (JAM)	Virginia	15.77 m (51 ft 8 3/4 in)	+0.6	
16	Jalyn Jackson (USA)	USC	15.73 m (51 ft 7 1/4 in)	-1.5	
17	Laquan Nairn (BAH)	Arkansas	15.72 m (51 ft 6 3/4 in)	+2.1	w
17	Jelaani Davis (USA)	Oklahoma	15.72 m (51 ft 6 3/4 in)	+2.2	w
19	Tylen Guidry (USA)	Lamar	15.70 m (51 ft 6 in)	+2.3	w
20	Jacore Irving (USA)	Florida State	15.58 m (51 ft 1 1/4 in)	+1.8	
21	Chauncey Chambers (USA)	Virginia Tech	15.54 m (50 ft 11 3/4 in)	+1.1	
22	Safin Wills (JAM)	Texas Tech	15.54 m (50 ft 11 3/4 in)	+0.3	
23	Keshun McGee (USA)	Alabama	15.34 m (50 ft 3 3/4 in)	+1.1	
24	Keshun Byrd (USA)	Mississippi State	15.33 m (50 ft 3 1/2 in)	-0.6	

- Results from Flash Results.

==== High jump ====
Rank	Athlete	Team	Mark	Notes
1st place, gold medalist(s)	JuVaughn Harrison (USA)	LSU	2.33 m (7 ft 7 1/2 in)	
2nd place, silver medalist(s)	Tejaswin Shankar (IND)	Kansas State	2.23 m (7 ft 3 3/4 in)	
3rd place, bronze medalist(s)	Mayson Conner (USA)	Nebraska	2.23 m (7 ft 3 3/4 in)	=PB
4	Darryl Sullivan (USA)	Tennessee	2.23 m (7 ft 3 3/4 in)	
5	Clayton Brown (JAM)	Florida	2.20 m (7 ft 2 1/2 in)	
5	Vernon Turner (USA)	Oklahoma	2.20 m (7 ft 2 1/2 in)	
7	Earnie Sears (USA)	USC	2.20 m (7 ft 2 1/2 in)	
8	Brandon Burke (USA)	Buffalo	2.20 m (7 ft 2 1/2 in)	=PB
9	Jordan Wesner (USA)	Florida State	2.20 m (7 ft 2 1/2 in)	
10	Jason Smith (USA)	Long Beach State	2.20 m (7 ft 2 1/2 in)	=PB
11	Justice Summerset (USA)	Arizona	2.20 m (7 ft 2 1/2 in)	
12	Zack Anderson (USA)	South Dakota	2.20 m (7 ft 2 1/2 in)	
13	Bryson DeBerry (USA)	UT-Arlington	2.15 m (7 ft 1/2 in)	
14	Allen Gordon (USA)	Ole Miss	2.15 m (7 ft 1/2 in)	
15	Justin Stuckey (USA)	Samford	2.15 m (7 ft 1/2 in)	
16	Dennis Manyeah (USA)	La Salle	2.15 m (7 ft 1/2 in)	
17	Ethan Harris (USA)	Grand Canyon	2.15 m (7 ft 1/2 in)	
18	Kaithon McDonald (USA)	Maryland	2.15 m (7 ft 1/2 in)	
19	Eric Richards (USA)	Southern Mississippi	2.10 m (6 ft 10 1/2 in)	
19	Isaiah Holmes (USA)	Miami	2.10 m (6 ft 10 1/2 in)	
21	Jonathan Wells (USA)	Illinois	2.10 m (6 ft 10 1/2 in)	
—	Michael Hoffer (USA)	Nebraska	—	NM
—	Trey Allen (USA)	Louisville	—	NM
—	Mitch Jacobson (USA)	Washington State	—	NM

- Results from Flash Results.

==== Pole vault ====
Rank	Athlete	Team	Mark	Notes
1st place, gold medalist(s)	Branson Ellis (USA)	Stephen F. Austin	5.70 m (18 ft 8 1/4 in)	
2nd place, silver medalist(s)	Keaton Daniel (USA)	Kentucky	5.55 m (18 ft 2 1/2 in)	
3rd place, bronze medalist(s)	Ethan Bray (USA)	South Dakota	5.55 m (18 ft 2 1/2 in)	
4	Clayton Fritsch (USA)	Sam Houston	5.55 m (18 ft 2 1/2 in)	
5	Zach Bradford (USA)	Kansas	5.45 m (17 ft 10 1/2 in)	
6	Ryan Lipe (USA)	Alabama	5.45 m (17 ft 10 1/2 in)	
7	Paulo Benavides (USA)	UTEP	5.30 m (17 ft 4 1/2 in)	
7	Hussain Al-Hizam (SAU)	Kansas	5.30 m (17 ft 4 1/2 in)	
9	Zach McWhorter (USA)	Brigham Young	5.30 m (17 ft 4 1/2 in)	
10	Jack Rhea (USA)	Kennesaw State	5.30 m (17 ft 4 1/2 in)	
11	Kyle Rademeyer (RSA)	South Alabama	5.30 m (17 ft 4 1/2 in)	
11	Christyan Sampy (USA)	Houston	5.30 m (17 ft 4 1/2 in)	
13	Nathan Stone (USA)	Indiana	5.15 m (16 ft 10 3/4 in)	
13	Trevor Stephenson (USA)	Michigan State	5.15 m (16 ft 10 3/4 in)	
—	Cole Courtois (USA)	UL-Lafeyette	—	NM
—	Trent Francom (USA)	South Dakota State	—	NM
—	Antonio Ruiz (USA)	Houston	—	NM
—	Stone Baker (USA)	South Florida	—	NM
—	Sam Young (USA)	Virginia	—	NM
—	Marshall Faurot (USA)	South Dakota	—	NM
—	Travis Snyder (USA)	Connecticut	—	NM
—	Michael Gonzalez (USA)	North Texas	—	NM
—	Cole Colozzo (USA)	Ole Miss	—	NM
—	Elijah Cole (USA)	UNC Charlotte	—	NM

- Results from Flash Results.

==== Shot put ====
Rank	Athlete	Team	Mark	Notes
1st place, gold medalist(s)	Turner Washington (USA)	Arizona State	21.10 m (69 ft 2 1/2 in)	PB
2nd place, silver medalist(s)	Adrian Piperi (USA)	Texas	20.71 m (67 ft 11 1/4 in)	
3rd place, bronze medalist(s)	Jordan Geist (USA)	Arizona	20.40 m (66 ft 11 in)	
4	Andrew Liskowitz (USA)	Michigan	20.07 m (65 ft 10 in)	
5	Joshua Sobota (USA)	Kentucky	19.82 m (65 ft 1/4 in)	PB
6	Zack Short (USA)	Idaho	19.71 m (64 ft 7 3/4 in)	=PB
7	Darius King (USA)	Northern Iowa	19.69 m (64 ft 7 in)	
8	Jonah Wilson (USA)	Washington	19.67 m (64 ft 6 1/4 in)	
9	Matthew Katnik (USA)	Southern California	19.55 m (64 ft 1 1/2 in)	
10	Connor Bandel (USA)	Florida	19.13 m (62 ft 9 in)	
11	McKay Johnson (USA)	Southern California	19.09 m (62 ft 7 1/2 in)	
12	Isaac Odugbesan (NGR)	Alabama	18.96 m (62 ft 2 1/4 in)	
13	Jordan West (USA)	Tennessee	18.72 m (61 ft 5 in)	
14	Kyle Mitchell (JAM)	Liberty	18.63 m (61 ft 1 1/4 in)	
15	Santiago Basso (CHL)	Alabama	18.59 m (60 ft 11 3/4 in)	
16	John Meyer (USA)	Michigan	18.37 m (60 ft 3 in)	
17	Adam Kessler (USA)	Drake	18.34 m (60 ft 2 in)	
18	Daniel McArthur (USA)	North Carolina	18.06 m (59 ft 3 in)	
19	Charles Lenford Jr. (USA)	Kentucky	18.05 m (59 ft 2 1/2 in)	
20	Kristoffer Thomsen (DEN)	North Dakota State	18.03 m (59 ft 1 3/4 in)	
21	Kyle Atkinson (USA)	Minnesota	17.45 m (57 ft 3 in)	
22	Michael Shoaf (USA)	Notre Dame	17.35 m (56 ft 11 in)	
—	Burger Lambrechts Jr. (RSA)	Nebraska	—	NM
—	Eric Favors (USA)	South Carolina	—	DNS

- Results from Flash Results.

==== Discus throw ====
Rank	Athlete	Team	Mark	Notes
1st place, gold medalist(s)	Turner Washington (USA)	Arizona State	63.42 m (208 ft 3/4 in)	
2nd place, silver medalist(s)	Roje Stona (JAM)	Clemson	61.94 m (203 ft 2 1/2 in)	PB
3rd place, bronze medalist(s)	Claudio Romero (CHL)	Virginia	61.36 m (201 ft 3 1/2 in)	
4	Malik Paul (USA)	South Carolina	58.35 m (191 ft 5 in)	PB
5	Jacob Lemmon (USA)	Virginia	57.78 m (189 ft 6 3/4 in)	
6	Elijah Mason (USA)	Washington	57.72 m (189 ft 4 1/4 in)	
7	Colton Paller (USA)	Wyoming	56.86 m (186 ft 6 1/2 in)	
8	Terrell Adams (USA)	Charlotte	56.85 m (186 ft 6 in)	
9	Josh Sobota (USA)	Kentucky	56.36 m (184 ft 10 3/4 in)	
10	Ian Schulz (USA)	Arizona State	56.25 m (184 ft 6 1/2 in)	
11	Francois Prinsloo (RSA)	South Alabama	56.22 m (184 ft 5 1/4 in)	
12	Adam Dawnson (USA)	Colorado State	56.06 m (183 ft 11 in)	
13	Iffy Joyner (USA)	California	55.72 m (182 ft 9 1/2 in)	
14	David Lucas (USA)	Pennsylvania State	55.53 m (182 ft 2 in)	
15	Dallin Shurts (USA)	Brigham Young	54.49 m (178 ft 9 1/4 in)	
16	Charles Lenford (USA)	Kentucky	54.45 m (178 ft 7 1/2 in)	
17	Aleks Hristov (BUL)	UTEP	54.32 m (178 ft 2 1/2 in)	
18	Kaleb Siekmeier (USA)	Minnesota	54.29 m (178 ft 1 1/4 in)	
19	Phillipe Barnett (JAM)	Minnesota	53.03 m (173 ft 11 3/4 in)	
20	Adar Sheere (ISR)	Louisville	52.22 m (171 ft 3 3/4 in)	
21	Milton Ingraham (USA)	Florida State	52.17 m (171 ft 1 3/4 in)	
22	Eron Carter (USA)	Arkansas State	52.03 m (170 ft 8 1/4 in)	
23	Mitchell Weber (USA)	Missouri	51.10 m (167 ft 7 3/4 in)	
—	Taige Bryant (USA)	Eastern Michigan	—	NM

- Results from Flash Results.

==== Javelin throw ====
Rank	Athlete	Team	Mark	Notes
1st place, gold medalist(s)	Tzuriel Pedigo (USA)	Louisiana State	76.98 m (252 ft 6 1/2 in)	PB
2nd place, silver medalist(s)	DJ Jónsson (ISL)	Mississippi State	76.73 m (251 ft 8 3/4 in)	
3rd place, bronze medalist(s)	Cade Antonucci (USA)	Auburn	76.14 m (249 ft 9 1/2 in)	PB
4	Tyriq Horsford (TTO)	Mississippi State	75.95 m (249 ft 2 in)	
5	Sindri Gudmundsson (ISL)	Mississippi State	75.61 m (248 ft 3/4 in)	
6	Franck Disanza (SUI)	Southeastern Louisiana	74.71 m (245 ft 1 1/4 in)	
7	Cameron Bates (USA)	Brigham Young	74.25 m (243 ft 7 in)	
8	Benji Phillips (USA)	North Dakota State	71.40 m (234 ft 3 in)	
9	Scott Fuchs (USA)	Iowa State	70.91 m (232 ft 7 1/2 in)	
10	Nils Fischer (GER)	Auburn	69.69 m (228 ft 7 1/2 in)	
11	Arthur Petersen (DEN)	UT Arlington	69.69 m (228 ft 7 1/2 in)	
12	Mark Porter (USA)	Pennsylvania State	69.19 m (227 ft 0 in)	
13	August Cook (USA)	Army West Point	68.48 m (224 ft 8 in)	
14	Donavon Banks (USA)	McNeese State	68.07 m (223 ft 3 3/4 in)	
15	Logan Wolfley (USA)	Kansas State	67.59 m (221 ft 9 in)	
16	Chase Tarr (USA)	UC Santa Barbara	67.00 m (219 ft 9 3/4 in)	
17	Cord Neal (USA)	Stephen F. Austin	65.86 m (216 ft 3/4 in)	
18	Sam Hankins (USA)	Texas A&M	64.96 m (213 ft 1 1/4 in)	
19	Carlan Naisant (USA)	Arizona State	64.83 m (212 ft 8 1/4 in)	
20	James McNaney (USA)	Rice	63.96 m (209 ft 10 in)	
21	Dalton Rasmussen (USA)	Oregon	62.81 m (206 ft 3/4 in)	
22	Izac Canchola (USA)	Stephen F. Austin	62.44 m (204 ft 10 1/4 in)	
23	Hunter Longino (USA)	McNeese State	57.00 m (187 ft 0 in)	
24	Brian Sagendorf (USA)	Mount St. Mary's	54.23 m (177 ft 11 in)	

- Results from Flash Results.

==== Hammer throw ====
Rank	Athlete	Team	Mark	Notes
1st place, gold medalist(s)	Thomas Mardal (NOR)	Florida	76.74 m (251 ft 9 1/4 in)	PB
2nd place, silver medalist(s)	Hleb Dudarau (BLR)	Kansas	74.53 m (244 ft 6 1/4 in)	
3rd place, bronze medalist(s)	Kostas Zaltos (GRE)	Minnesota	71.21 m (233 ft 7 1/2 in)	PB
4	Vlad Pavlenko (USA)	Iowa State	71.12 m (233 ft 4 in)	
5	Alexios Prodanas (GRE)	Virginia Tech	71.08 m (233 ft 2 1/4 in)	PB
6	Alex Talley (USA)	North Dakota State	70.99 m (232 ft 10 3/4 in)	
7	Jon Nerdal (NOR)	Louisiana State	70.88 m (232 ft 6 1/2 in)	
8	Jordan Geist (USA)	Arizona	70.53 m (231 ft 4 3/4 in)	
9	Tyler Merkley (USA)	Pennsylvania State	70.28 m (230 ft 6 3/4 in)	PB
10	Manning Plater (USA)	Illinois	70.15 m (230 ft 1 3/4 in)	PB
11	Nathan Bultman (USA)	Southern California	70.09 m (229 ft 11 1/4 in)	
12	Michael Bryan (USA)	Wichita State	70.08 m (229 ft 11 in)	
13	Israel Oloyede (USA)	Arizona	69.99 m (229 ft 7 1/2 in)	
14	Kevin Arreaga (ESP)	Miami	69.60 m (228 ft 4 in)	
15	Bobby Colantonio (USA)	Alabama	69.53 m (228 ft 1 1/4 in)	
16	Georgios Korakidis (GRE)	Tennessee	69.45 m (227 ft 10 1/4 in)	PB
17	Ricky Hurley (USA)	Southern Illinois	68.82 m (225 ft 9 1/4 in)	PB
18	Ryan Davis (USA)	East Carolina	68.79 m (225 ft 8 1/4 in)	
19	Kieran McKeag (USA)	Alabama	68.43 m (224 ft 6 in)	
20	Alencar Pereira (BRA)	Georgia	67.83 m (222 ft 6 1/4 in)	
21	Taige Bryant (USA)	Eastern Michigan	67.43 m (221 ft 2 1/2 in)	PB
22	Jake Norris (GBR)	Louisiana State	67.12 m (220 ft 2 1/2 in)	
23	Bayley Campbell (GBR)	Oklahoma	65.86 m (216 ft 3/4 in)	
24	Jayden White (USA)	Washington	63.04 m (206 ft 9 3/4 in)	

- Results from Flash Results.

==== Decathlon ====
Rank	Athlete	Team	Overall points	100 m	LJ	SP	HJ	400 m	110 m H	DT	PV	JT	1500 m
1st place, gold medalist(s)	Karel Tilga (EST)	Georgia	8261	874; 10.94	937; 7.51 m (24 ft 7 1/2 in)	820; 15.49 m (50 ft 9 3/4 in)	896; 2.10 m (6 ft 10 1/2 in)	857; 49.10	825; 15.20	797; 46.46 m (152 ft 5 in)	763; 4.51 m (14 ft 9 1/2 in)	785; 63.11 m (207 ft 1/2 in)	707; 4:35.77
2nd place, silver medalist(s)	Ayden Owens (PUR)	Michigan	8114	942; 10.64	854; 7.17 m (23 ft 6 1/4 in)	736; 14.13 m (46 ft 4 1/4 in)	785; 1.98 m (6 ft 5 3/4 in)	943; 47.30	950; 14.19	726; 43.02 m (141 ft 1 1/2 in)	793; 4.61 m (15 ft 1 1/4 in)	615; 51.77 m (169 ft 10 in)	770; 4:26.21
3rd place, bronze medalist(s)	Markus Ballengee (USA)	Arkansas	7861	852; 11.04	723; 6.61 m (21 ft 8 in)	798; 15.14 m (49 ft 8 in)	758; 1.95 m (6 ft 4 3/4 in)	818; 49.93	935; 14.31	873; 50.14 m (164 ft 6 in)	852; 4.81 m (15 ft 9 1/4 in)	600; 50.75 m (166 ft 6 in)	652; 4:44.59
4	Leo Neugebauer (GER)	Texas	7697	830; 11.14	847; 7.14 m (23 ft 5 in)	799; 15.15 m (49 ft 8 1/4 in)	840; 2.04 m (6 ft 8 1/4 in)	789; 50.56	833; 15.14	824; 47.77 m (156 ft 8 1/2 in)	822; 4.71 m (15 ft 5 1/4 in)	503; 44.16 m (144 ft 10 1/2 in)	610; 4:51.45
5	Alex Spyridonidis (GRE)	Auburn	7665 PB	834; 11.12	833; 7.08 m (23 ft 2 1/2 in)	730; 14.02 m (45 ft 11 3/4 in)	785; 1.98 m (6 ft 5 3/4 in)	803; 50.25	851; 14.99	644; 38.97 m (127 ft 10 1/4 in)	913; 5.01 m (16 ft 5 in)	643; 53.69 m (176 ft 1 3/4 in)	629; 4:48.30
6	Aaron Booth (NZL)	Long Beach State	7644 PB	850; 11.05	845; 7.13 m (23 ft 4 1/2 in)	689; 13.35 m (43 ft 9 1/2 in)	785; 1.98 m (6 ft 5 3/4 in)	759; 51.22	808; 15.35	709; 42.16 m (138 ft 3 3/4 in)	822; 4.71 m (15 ft 5 1/4 in)	696; 57.24 m (187 ft 9 1/2 in)	681; 4:39.95
7	Will Daniels (USA)	Iowa	7635	922; 10.73	883; 7.29 m (23 ft 11 in)	714; 13.77 m (45 ft 2 in)	840; 2.04 m (6 ft 8 1/4 in)	770; 50.97	895; 14.63	635; 38.54 m (126 ft 5 1/4 in)	763; 4.51 m (14 ft 9 1/2 in)	624; 52.42 m (171 ft 11 3/4 in)	589; 4:55.02
8	Maximilian Vollmer (GER)	Oregon	7633	888; 10.88	852; 7.16 m (23 ft 5 3/4 in)	832; 15.68 m (51 ft 5 1/4 in)	705; 1.89 m (6 ft 2 1/4 in)	863; 48.96	840; 15.08	573; 35.48 m (116 ft 4 3/4 in)	793; 4.61 m (15 ft 1 1/4 in)	726; 59.21 m (194 ft 3 in)	561; 4:59.72
9	Wade Walder (USA)	Michigan State	7565 PB	804; 11.26	723; 6.61 m (21 ft 8 in)	717; 13.81 m (45 ft 3 1/2 in)	705; 1.89 m (6 ft 2 1/4 in)	818; 49.93	841; 15.07	675; 40.52 m (132 ft 11 1/4 in)	883; 4.91 m (16 ft 1 1/4 in)	733; 59.66 m (195 ft 8 3/4 in)	666; 4:42.28
10	Isaiah Martin (USA)	Purdue	7542	825; 11.16	857; 7.18 m (23 ft 6 1/2 in)	659; 12.86 m (42 ft 2 1/4 in)	813; 2.01 m (6 ft 7 in)	787; 50.61	896; 14.62	679; 40.73 m (133 ft 7 1/2 in)	705; 4.31 m (14 ft 1 1/2 in)	642; 53.59 m (175 ft 9 3/4 in)	679; 4:40.13
11	Heath Baldwin (USA)	Michigan	7522	799; 11.28	783; 6.87 m (22 ft 6 1/4 in)	749; 14.34 m (47 ft 1/2 in)	868; 2.07 m (6 ft 9 1/4 in)	758; 51.25	901; 14.58	518; 32.72 m (107 ft 4 in)	763; 4.51 m (14 ft 9 1/2 in)	718; 58.67 m (192 ft 5 3/4 in)	665; 4:42.48
12	Joseph Keys (USA)	Marquette	7479	832; 11.13	864; 7.21 m (23 ft 7 3/4 in)	647; 12.67 m (41 ft 6 3/4 in)	705; 1.89 m (6 ft 2 1/4 in)	822; 49.84	857; 14.94	587; 36.14 m (118 ft 6 3/4 in)	705; 4.31 m (14 ft 1 1/2 in)	694; 57.06 m (187 ft 2 1/4 in)	766; 4:26.83
13	Noah Swaby (USA)	Pennsylvania State	7428	810; 11.23	734; 6.66 m (21 ft 10 in)	725; 13.95 m (45 ft 9 in)	679; 1.86 m (6 ft 1 in)	790; 50.53	824; 15.21	785; 45.86 m (150 ft 5 1/2 in)	734; 4.41 m (14 ft 5 1/2 in)	664; 55.10 m (180 ft 9 1/4 in)	683; 4:39.53
14	Teddy Frid (USA)	Minnesota	7330	808; 11.24	799; 6.94 m (22 ft 9 in)	631; 12.40 m (40 ft 8 in)	758; 1.95 m (6 ft 4 3/4 in)	785; 50.64	875; 14.79	635; 38.53 m (126 ft 4 3/4 in)	822; 4.71 m (15 ft 5 1/4 in)	503; 44.16 m (144 ft 10 1/2 in)	714; 4:34.74
15	Denim Rogers (USA)	Houston Baptist	7233	843; 11.08	753; 6.74 m (22 ft 1 1/4 in)	637; 12.51 m (41 ft 1/2 in)	758; 1.95 m (6 ft 4 3/4 in)	836; 49.54	879; 14.76	610; 37.32 m (122 ft 5 1/4 in)	734; 4.41 m (14 ft 5 1/2 in)	618; 52.00 m (170 ft 7 in)	565; 4:59.12
16	Josh Farmer (USA)	UC Irvine	7206	874; 10.94	792; 6.91 m (22 ft 8 in)	715; 13.79 m (45 ft 2 3/4 in)	705; 1.89 m (6 ft 2 1/4 in)	880; 48.61	609; 17.15	616; 37.62 m (123 ft 5 in)	763; 4.51 m (14 ft 9 1/2 in)	574; 49.01 m (160 ft 9 1/2 in)	678; 4:40.37
17	Dallin Vorkink (USA)	Brigham Young	6388	730; 11.61	688; 6.46 m (21 ft 2 1/4 in)	693; 13.42 m (44 ft 1/4 in)	758; 1.95 m (6 ft 4 3/4 in)	745; 51.53	766; 15.71	628; 38.22 m (125 ft 4 1/2 in)	0 NM	614; 51.70 m (169 ft 7 1/4 in)	766; 4:26.83
18	Jordan Torney (USA)	Connecticut	6230	850; 11.05	828; 7.06 m (23 ft 1 3/4 in)	629; 12.37 m (40 ft 7 in)	679; 1.86 m (6 ft 1 in)	0 DQ	846; 15.03	619; 37.75 m (123 ft 10 in)	705; 4.31 m (14 ft 1 1/2 in)	482; 42.73 m (140 ft 2 1/4 in)	592; 4:54.42
—	Daniel Spejcher (USA)	Arkansas	DNF	850; 11.05	788; 6.89 m (22 ft 7 1/4 in)	760; 14.52 m (47 ft 7 1/2 in)	679; 1.86 m (6 ft 1 in)	826; 49.75	860; 14.91	683; 40.93 m (134 ft 3 1/4 in)	0 NM	0 DNS	0 DNS
—	Asani Hylton (JAM)	Stephen F. Austin	DNF	874; 10.94	816; 7.01 m (22 ft 11 3/4 in)	708; 13.66 m (44 ft 9 3/4 in)	868; 2.07 m (6 ft 9 1/4 in)	818; 49.92	880; 14.75	591; 36.34 m (119 ft 2 1/2 in)	0 NM	0 DNS	0 DNS
—	Scott Boon (NED)	Houston Baptist	DNF	817; 11.20	0 NM	499; 10.23 m (33 ft 6 3/4 in)	653; 1.83 m (6 ft 0 in)	0 DNS	0 DNS	0 DNS	0 DNS	0 DNS	0 DNS
—	Damien Berthenet (FRA)	Cincinnati	DNF	578; 12.38	610; 6.11 m (20 ft 1/2 in)	703; 13.59 m (44 ft 7 in)	0 DNS	0 DNS	0 DNS	0 DNS	0 DNS	0 DNS	0 DNS
—	Austin West (USA)	Iowa	DNF	903; 10.81	866; 7.22 m (23 ft 8 1/4 in)	0 DNS	0 DNS	0 DNS	0 DNS	0 DNS	0 DNS	0 DNS	0 DNS
—	Jack Turner (GBR)	UTSA	DNS	0 DNS	0 DNS	0 DNS	0 DNS	0 DNS	0 DNS	0 DNS	0 DNS	0 DNS	0 DNS

Results from Flash Results.

=== Women ===
==== 100 meters ====
Wind: +2.2 m/s (wind-assisted)

Rank	Athlete	Team	Time	Notes
1st place, gold medalist(s)	Cambrea Sturgis (USA)	North Carolina A&T	10.74	
2nd place, silver medalist(s)	Twanisha Terry (USA)	USC	10.79	
3rd place, bronze medalist(s)	Tamara Clark (USA)	Alabama	10.88	
4	Kemba Nelson (JAM)	Oregon	10.90	
5	Alfreda Steele (USA)	Miami	11.11	
6	Jayla Kirkland (USA)	Florida State	11.22	
7	Lanae-Tava Thomas (USA)	USC	11.24	
8	Celera Barnes (USA)	Kentucky	11.31	
9	Ackera Nugent (JAM)	Baylor	11.37	

- Results from Flash Results.

==== 200 meters ====
Wind: +0.2 m/s

Rank	Athlete	Team	Time	Notes
1st place, gold medalist(s)	Cambrea Sturgis (USA)	North Carolina A&T	22.12	PB CL
2nd place, silver medalist(s)	Tamara Clark (USA)	Alabama	22.17	
3rd place, bronze medalist(s)	Anavia Battle (USA)	Ohio State	22.42	
4	Favour Ofili (NGR)	LSU	22.45	
5	Twanisha Terry (USA)	USC	22.69	
6	Angie Annelus (USA)	USC	22.72	
7	Alfreda Steele (USA)	Miami	22.77	=PB
8	Kevona Davis (JAM)	Texas	22.78	PB
9	Cassondra Hall (USA)	UNLV	22.94	

- Results from Flash Results.

==== 400 meters ====
Rank	Athlete	Team	Time	Notes
1st place, gold medalist(s)	Athing Mu (USA)	Texas A&M	49.57	CR PB
2nd place, silver medalist(s)	Talitha Diggs (USA)	Florida	50.74	PB
3rd place, bronze medalist(s)	Kyra Constantine (CAN)	USC	50.87	PB
4	Nicole Yeargin (GBR)	USC	51.02	
5	Charokee Young (JAM)	Texas A&M	51.13	
6	Stacey-Ann Williams (JAM)	Texas	51.34	
7	Bailey Lear (USA)	USC	51.36	
8	Taylor Manson (USA)	Florida	51.55	
9	Brittany Aveni (USA)	Duke	51.77	

- Results from Flash Results.

==== 800 meters ====
Rank	Athlete	Team	Time	Notes
1st place, gold medalist(s)	Michaela Meyer (USA)	Virginia	2:00.28	PB
2nd place, silver medalist(s)	Laurie Barton (USA)	Clemson	2:00.65	PB
3rd place, bronze medalist(s)	Gabrielle Wilkinson (USA)	Florida	2:01.20	PB
4	Claire Seymour (USA)	Brigham Young	2:01.91	PB
5	Sarah Hendrick (USA)	Kennesaw State	2:02.59	
6	Lindsey Butler (USA)	Virginia Tech	2:02.83	
7	Avi' Tal Wilson-Perteete (USA)	UNLV	2:02.85	
8	Brooke Fazio (USA)	Richmond	2:02.97	
9	Shafiqua Maloney (SVG)	Arkansas	2:04.09	
10	Amber Tanner (USA)	Georgia	2:04.27	

- Results from Flash Results.

==== 1500 meters ====
Rank	Athlete	Team	Time	Notes
1st place, gold medalist(s)	Anna Camp-Bennett (USA)	Brigham Young	4:08.53	PB
2nd place, silver medalist(s)	Sage Hurta (USA)	Colorado	4:09.42	
3rd place, bronze medalist(s)	Ella Donaghu (USA)	Stanford	4:09.66	PB
4	Danae Rivers (USA)	Pennsylvania State	4:10.47	PB
5	Krissy Gear (USA)	Arkansas	4:11.01	
6	Micaela Degenero (USA)	Colorado	4:11.26	
7	Amaris Tyynismaa (USA)	Alabama	4:11.56	
8	Christina Aragon (USA)	Stanford	4:12.63	
9	Kelsey Harris (USA)	Indiana	4:13.93	
10	Olivia Howell (USA)	Illinois	4:15.56	
11	Lauren Berman (USA)	Virginia Tech	4:16.37	
12	Maudie Skyring (AUS)	Florida State	4:21.04	

- Results from Flash Results.

==== 5000 meters ====
Rank	Athlete	Team	Time	Notes
1st place, gold medalist(s)	Elly Henes (USA)	NC State	15:28.05	
2nd place, silver medalist(s)	Katie Wasserman (USA)	Notre Dame	15:28.68	PB
3rd place, bronze medalist(s)	Bethany Hasz (USA)	Minnesota	15:30.57	PB
4	Jenna Magness (USA)	Michigan	15:32.91	PB
5	Mercy Chelangat (KEN)	Alabama	15:33.20	
6	Julia Heymach (USA)	Stanford	15:33.62	PB
7	Emily Mackay (USA)	Binghamton	15:42.38	PB
8	Clare O'Brien (AUS)	Boise State	15:44.44	
9	Amelia Mazza-Downie (AUS)	New Mexico	15:45.74	
10	Haley Herberg (USA)	Washington	15:47.46	
11	Maddy Denner (USA)	Notre Dame	15:49.71	PB
12	Ella Donaghu (USA)	Stanford	15:53.25	
13	Joyce Kimeli (KEN)	Auburn	15:54.11	
14	Esther Gitahi (KEN)	Alabama	15:58.59	
15	Nicole Fegans (USA)	Georgia Tech	15:59.72	
16	Savannah Shaw (USA)	NC State	16:02.90	
17	Abby Nichols (USA)	Colorado	16:04.74	
18	Whittni Orton (USA)	Brigham Young	16:05.33	
19	Ericka Vanderlende (USA)	Michigan	16:09.09	
20	Jessica Drop (USA)	Georgia	16:10.19	
21	Lauren Gregory (USA)	Arkansas	16:13.49	
22	Poppy Tank (GBR)	Utah	16:15.88	
23	Aoibhe Richardson (IRL)	San Francisco	16:33.99	
24	Gabby Hentemann (USA)	Oklahoma State	16:56.70	

- Results from Flash Results.

==== 10000 meters ====
Rank	Athlete	Team	Time	Notes
1st place, gold medalist(s)	(Spain) Carmela Cardama Baez	Oregon	32:16.13	PB
2nd place, silver medalist(s)	(Kenya) Mercy Chelangat	Alabama	32:22.11	
3rd place, bronze medalist(s)	(United States) Maria Mettler	Air Force	32:34.05	PB
4	(United States) Katie Izzo	Arkansas	32:34.16	PB
5	(United States) Haley Herberg	Washington	32:35.59	PB
6	(Australia) Clare O'Brien	Boise State	32:36.96	PB
7	(United States) Grace Forbes	Rice	32:38.91	
8	(United States) Kelsey Chmiel	NC State	32:45.83	PB
9	(United Kingdom) Poppy Tank	Utah	32:50.57	PB
10	(United States) Amanda Vestri	Syracuse	32:52.74	
11	(United States) Jessa Hanson	Northern Arizona	32:55.24	PB
12	(United States) Abbey Wheeler	Providence	33:04.56	PB
13	(United States) Lexie Thompson	Weber State	33:06.95	
14	(United States) Cailie Logue	Iowa State	33:07.63	PB
15	(United States) Annie Heffernan	Syracuse	33:09.83	PB
16	(United States) Stephanie Sherman	Toledo	33:25.31	PB
17	(Australia) Clio Ozanne-Jaques	Ole Miss	33:26.86	PB
18	(United States) Lynsie Gram	Michigan State	33:28.33	PB
19	(United States) Chandler Horton	Charlotte	33:41.34	PB
20	(United States) India Johnson	Michigan State	33:44.88	
21	(United States) Jessi Larson	Michigan	33:54.70	
22	(United States) Ashley Tutt	Northern Illinois	33:58.63	
23	(United States) Katie Rose Blachowicz	Notre Dame	34:42.50	
—	(United States) Abby Nichols	Colorado	—	DNF

- Results from Flash Results.

==== 100-meter hurdles ====
Wind: +0.4 m/s

Rank	Athlete	Team	Time	Notes
1st place, gold medalist(s)	Anna Cockrell (USA)	USC	12.58	
2nd place, silver medalist(s)	Rayniah Jones (USA)	UCF	12.82	
3rd place, bronze medalist(s)	Ackera Nugent (JAM)	Baylor	12.84	
4	Grace Stark (USA)	Florida	12.89	
5	Madeleine Akobundu (USA)	North Carolina A&T	12.90	
6	Masai Russell (USA)	Kentucky	12.97	
7	Cha'Mia Rothwell (USA)	Duke	13.14	
8	TeJyrica Robinson (USA)	North Carolina A&T	29.11	
—	Tonea Marshall (USA)	LSU	—	DNS

- Results from Flash Results.

==== 400-meter hurdles ====
Rank	Athlete	Team	Time	Notes
1st place, gold medalist(s)	Anna Cockrell (USA)	USC	54.68	PB CL
2nd place, silver medalist(s)	Shannon Meisberger (USA)	Arizona	55.70	PB
3rd place, bronze medalist(s)	Andrenette Knight (JAM)	Virginia	55.81	
4	Masai Russell (USA)	Kentucky	56.18	PB
5	Milan Young (USA)	LSU	56.23	PB
6	Faith Ross (USA)	Kentucky	56.49	PB
7	Ashton Lindley (USA)	South Carolina	56.74	PB
8	Stephanie Cho (CAN)	Washington State	57.48	PB
9	Brittley Humphrey (USA)	LSU	57.51	

- Results from Flash Results.

==== 3000-meter steeplechase ====
Rank	Athlete	Team	Time	Notes
1st place, gold medalist(s)	Mahala Norris (USA)	Air Force	9:31.79	PB
2nd place, silver medalist(s)	Joyce Kimeli (KEN)	Auburn	9:31.84	PB
3rd place, bronze medalist(s)	Katie Rainsberger (USA)	Washington	9:32.12	PB
4	Courtney Wayment (USA)	Brigham Young	9:32.93	
5	Charlotte Prouse (CAN)	New Mexico	9:34.25	PB
6	Ceili McCabe (CAN)	West Virginia	9:37.39	PB
7	Gabrielle Jennings (USA)	Furman	9:38.24	PB
8	Summer Allen (USA)	Weber State	9:40.37	
9	Aneta Konieczek (POL)	Oregon	9:44.67	
10	Olivia Markezich (USA)	Notre Dame	9:48.73	
11	Abby Kohut-Jackson (USA)	Minnesota	9:50.89	
12	Alissa Niggemann (USA)	Wisconsin	10:12.13	

- Results from Flash Results.

==== 4 × 100-meter relay ====
Rank	Team	Time	Notes
1st place, gold medalist(s)	USC	42.82	
2nd place, silver medalist(s)	LSU	42.84	
3rd place, bronze medalist(s)	North Carolina A&T	43.03	
4	Florida State	43.06	
5	Texas	43.20	
6	Alabama	43.99	
7	Houston	44.29	
8	Baylor	45.15	
—	Oregon	—	DQ

- Results from Flash Results.

==== 4 × 400-meter relay ====
Rank	Team	Time	Notes
1st place, gold medalist(s)	Texas A&M	3:22.34	CR
2nd place, silver medalist(s)	USC	3:24.54	
3rd place, bronze medalist(s)	UCLA	3:25.01	
4	Florida	3:26.31	
5	Texas	3:26.72	
6	South Carolina	3:26.73	
7	Duke	3:28.27	
8	Kentucky	3:28.68	
9	Arkansas	3:28.78	

- Results from Flash Results.

==== Long jump ====
Rank	Athlete	Team	Mark	Wind (m/s)	Notes
1st place, gold medalist(s)	Tara Davis	University of Texas at Austin	6.70m	+1.0	
2nd place, silver medalist(s)	Tyra Gittens	Texas A&M	6.68m	+0.2	
3rd place, bronze medalist(s)	Jasmine Moore	University of Georgia	6.65m	+1.5	
4	Bria Matthews	Georgia Tech	6.58m	+0.3	
5	Alysah Hickey	University of Oregon	6.50m	+0.7	
6	Claire Bryant	University of Florida	6.45m	+0.1	
7	Deborah Acquah	Texas A&M	6.39m	-0.5	
8	Ruth Usoro	Texas Tech	6.36m	+0.5	
9	Jada Seaman	University of Virginia	6.36m	+0.6	
10	Shaniya Benjamin	South Florida	6.35m	+0.8	
11	G'Auna Edwards	University of Arkansas	6.35m	-0.3	
12	Leah Moran	Indiana University Bloomington	6.29m	+0.2	
13	Monae' Nichols	Texas Tech	6.28m	+0.1	
14	Mercy Abire	LSU	6.28m	+0.2	
15	Rhesa Foster	University of Oregon	6.26m	+1.1	
16	Taishia Pryce	Kansas State	6.24m	+0.4	
17	Titiana Marsh	University of Georgia	6.19m	+0.3	
18	Samiyah Samuels	University of Houston	6.12m	+0.8	
19	Aliyah Whisby	LSU	6.09m	-0.3	
20	Alex Madlock	Baylor University	6.02m	+0.6	
21	Kieshonna Brooks	Ole Miss	6.01m	+1.1	
22	Jasmyn Steels	Northwestern St.	5.99m	-0.3	
23	Khyasia Caldwell	University of Virginia	5.88m	+0.7	
24	Taryn Milton	Texas A&M	5.76m	+1.1	

==== Triple jump ====
Rank	Athlete	Team	Mark	Wind (m/s)	Notes
1st place, gold medalist(s)			0.00 m (0 in)	+0.0	
2nd place, silver medalist(s)			0.00 m (0 in)	+0.0	
3rd place, bronze medalist(s)			0.00 m (0 in)	+0.0	
4			0.00 m (0 in)	+0.0	
5			0.00 m (0 in)	+0.0	
6			0.00 m (0 in)	+0.0	
7			0.00 m (0 in)	+0.0	
8			0.00 m (0 in)	+0.0	
9			0.00 m (0 in)	+0.0	
10			0.00 m (0 in)	+0.0	
11			0.00 m (0 in)	+0.0	
12			0.00 m (0 in)	+0.0	
13			0.00 m (0 in)	+0.0	
14			0.00 m (0 in)	+0.0	
15			0.00 m (0 in)	+0.0	
16			0.00 m (0 in)	+0.0	
17			0.00 m (0 in)	+0.0	
18			0.00 m (0 in)	+0.0	
19			0.00 m (0 in)	+0.0	
20			0.00 m (0 in)	+0.0	
21			0.00 m (0 in)	+0.0	
22			0.00 m (0 in)	+0.0	
23			0.00 m (0 in)	+0.0	
24			0.00 m (0 in)	+0.0	

==== High jump ====
Rank	Athlete	Team	Mark	Notes
1st place, gold medalist(s)			0.00 m (0 in)	
2nd place, silver medalist(s)			0.00 m (0 in)	
3rd place, bronze medalist(s)			0.00 m (0 in)	
4			0.00 m (0 in)	
5			0.00 m (0 in)	
6			0.00 m (0 in)	
7			0.00 m (0 in)	
8			0.00 m (0 in)	
9			0.00 m (0 in)	
10			0.00 m (0 in)	
11			0.00 m (0 in)	
12			0.00 m (0 in)	
13			0.00 m (0 in)	
14			0.00 m (0 in)	
15			0.00 m (0 in)	
16			0.00 m (0 in)	
17			0.00 m (0 in)	
18			0.00 m (0 in)	
19			0.00 m (0 in)	
20			0.00 m (0 in)	
21			0.00 m (0 in)	
22			0.00 m (0 in)	
23			0.00 m (0 in)	
24			0.00 m (0 in)	

==== Pole vault ====
Rank	Athlete	Team	Mark	Notes
1st place, gold medalist(s)			0.00 m (0 in)	
2nd place, silver medalist(s)			0.00 m (0 in)	
3rd place, bronze medalist(s)			0.00 m (0 in)	
4			0.00 m (0 in)	
5			0.00 m (0 in)	
6			0.00 m (0 in)	
7			0.00 m (0 in)	
8			0.00 m (0 in)	
9			0.00 m (0 in)	
10			0.00 m (0 in)	
11			0.00 m (0 in)	
12			0.00 m (0 in)	
13			0.00 m (0 in)	
14			0.00 m (0 in)	
15			0.00 m (0 in)	
16			0.00 m (0 in)	
17			0.00 m (0 in)	
18			0.00 m (0 in)	
19			0.00 m (0 in)	
20			0.00 m (0 in)	
21			0.00 m (0 in)	
22			0.00 m (0 in)	
23			0.00 m (0 in)	
24			0.00 m (0 in)	

==== Shot put ====
Rank	Athlete	Team	Mark	Notes
1st place, gold medalist(s)			0.00 m (0 in)	
2nd place, silver medalist(s)			0.00 m (0 in)	
3rd place, bronze medalist(s)			0.00 m (0 in)	
4			0.00 m (0 in)	
5			0.00 m (0 in)	
6			0.00 m (0 in)	
7			0.00 m (0 in)	
8			0.00 m (0 in)	
9			0.00 m (0 in)	
10			0.00 m (0 in)	
11			0.00 m (0 in)	
12			0.00 m (0 in)	
13			0.00 m (0 in)	
14			0.00 m (0 in)	
15			0.00 m (0 in)	
16			0.00 m (0 in)	
17			0.00 m (0 in)	
18			0.00 m (0 in)	
19			0.00 m (0 in)	
20			0.00 m (0 in)	
21			0.00 m (0 in)	
22			0.00 m (0 in)	
23			0.00 m (0 in)	
24			0.00 m (0 in)	

==== Discus throw ====
Rank	Athlete	Team	Mark	Notes
1st place, gold medalist(s)			0.00 m (0 in)	
2nd place, silver medalist(s)			0.00 m (0 in)	
3rd place, bronze medalist(s)			0.00 m (0 in)	
4			0.00 m (0 in)	
5			0.00 m (0 in)	
6			0.00 m (0 in)	
7			0.00 m (0 in)	
8			0.00 m (0 in)	
9			0.00 m (0 in)	
10			0.00 m (0 in)	
11			0.00 m (0 in)	
12			0.00 m (0 in)	
13			0.00 m (0 in)	
14			0.00 m (0 in)	
15			0.00 m (0 in)	
16			0.00 m (0 in)	
17			0.00 m (0 in)	
18			0.00 m (0 in)	
19			0.00 m (0 in)	
20			0.00 m (0 in)	
21			0.00 m (0 in)	
22			0.00 m (0 in)	
23			0.00 m (0 in)	
24			0.00 m (0 in)	

==== Javelin throw ====
Rank	Athlete	Team	Mark	Notes
1st place, gold medalist(s)	Marie-Therese Obst (NOR)	Georgia	59.69 m (195 ft 10 in)	
2nd place, silver medalist(s)	Alizee Minard (FRA)	Arizona State	57.91 m (189 ft 11 3/4 in)	PB
3rd place, bronze medalist(s)	Maura Fiamoncini (USA)	Bucknell	56.48 m (185 ft 3 1/2 in)	PB
4	Vanja Spaic (BIH)	Fresno State	55.06 m (180 ft 7 1/2 in)	PB
5	Kari Wolfe (USA)	North Dakota State	55.02 m (180 ft 6 in)	PB
6	Kylee Carter (USA)	Auburn	55.00 m (180 ft 5 1/4 in)	
7	Virginia Miller (USA)	Stanford	54.49 m (178 ft 9 1/4 in)	PB
8	Kelechi Nwanaga (NGA)	Florida State	54.19 m (177 ft 9 1/4 in)	
9	Skylar Ciccolini (USA)	Missouri	53.71 m (176 ft 2 1/2 in)	
10	Sara Žabarino (ITA)	Florida State	53.51 m (175 ft 6 1/2 in)	
11	Casey Bogues (USA)	Dayton	53.39 m (175 ft 1 3/4 in)	PB
12	Maria Bienvenu (USA)	Louisiana	53.38 m (175 ft 1 1/2 in)	PB
13	Akealy Moton (USA)	North Dakota State	53.37 m (175 ft 1 in)	
14	Ashley Carter (USA)	Auburn	53.04 m (174 ft 0 in)	PB
15	Ilaria Casarotto (ITA)	UCLA	52.80 m (173 ft 2 1/2 in)	
16	Madison Wiltrout (USA)	North Carolina	51.56 m (169 ft 1 3/4 in)	
17	Lauri Paredes (PRY)	Oregon	51.46 m (168 ft 9 3/4 in)	
18	Roosa Ylönen (FIN)	UTEP	50.28 m (164 ft 11 1/2 in)	
19	Maddie Harris (USA)	Nebraska	49.97 m (163 ft 11 1/4 in)	
20	Mirta Kulisic (HRV)	Nebraska	49.70 m (163 ft 1/2 in)	
21	Rhema Otabor (BHS)	FIU	49.60 m (162 ft 8 3/4 in)	
22	Mona Jaidi (NOR)	Memphis	49.27 m (161 ft 7 3/4 in)	
23	Ilhame Tamrouti (NLD)	Loyola (Ill.)	47.27 m (155 ft 1 in)	
–	Arianne Duarte-Morais (NOR)	Florida	–	DNS

==== Hammer throw ====
Rank	Athlete	Team	Mark	Notes
1st place, gold medalist(s)	(Canada) Camryn Rogers	California	75.52 m (247 ft 9 in)	CR PB
2nd place, silver medalist(s)	(United States) Shey Taiwo	Ole Miss	71.27 m (233 ft 9 3/4 in)	PB
3rd place, bronze medalist(s)	(United States) Jillian Shippee	North Carolina	69.42 m (227 ft 9 in)	PB
4	(United Kingdom) Tara Simpson-Sullivan	Rice	68.78 m (225 ft 7 3/4 in)	
5	(Norway) Beatrice Llano	Arizona State	68.78 m (225 ft 7 3/4 in)	SB
6	(United States) Maddy Nilles	North Dakota State	68.61 m (225 ft 1 in)	
7	(Nigeria) Sade Olatoye	Ohio State	67.84 m (222 ft 6 3/4 in)	
8	(Jamaica) Nayoka Clunis	Tennessee	67.40 m (221 ft 1 1/2 in)	PB
9	(Canada) Kaila Butler	Bowling Green	67.01 m (219 ft 10 in)	PB
10	(United States) Alyssa Wilson	UCLA	66.52 m (218 ft 2 3/4 in)	
11	(United States) Autavia Fluker	South Alabama	66.31 m (217 ft 6 1/2 in)	
12	(United States) Mikaila Martin	Houston	66.08 m (216 ft 9 1/2 in)	
13	(United States) Shelby Moran	Arizona State	66.01 m (216 ft 6 3/4 in)	PB
14	(United States) Emma Robbins	LSU	65.95 m (216 ft 4 1/4 in)	
15	(United States) Shauniece O'Neal	Southern Illinois	65.84 m (216 ft 0 in)	
16	(United States) Jalani Davis	Ole Miss	65.52 m (214 ft 11 1/2 in)	PB
17	(United States) Rachel Tanczos	Notre Dame	65.03 m (213 ft 4 in)	
18	(United States) Molly Leppelmeier	Kentucky	64.62 m (212 ft 0 in)	=PB
19	(United States) Madi Malone	Auburn	63.96 m (209 ft 10 in)	
20	(United States) Joy McArthur	USC	63.94 m (209 ft 9 1/4 in)	
21	(United States) Tess Keyzers	Minnesota	63.82 m (209 ft 4 1/2 in)	
22	(United States) Quiara Wheeler	Central Michigan	62.64 m (205 ft 6 in)	
23	(Norway) Helene Ingvaldsen	Kansas State	60.90 m (199 ft 9 1/2 in)	
—	(United States) Shaelyn Ward	Kansas State	—	NM

- Results from Flash Results.

==== Heptathlon ====
Rank	Athlete	Team	Overall points	100 m H	HJ	SP	200 m	LJ	JT	800 m
1st place, gold medalist(s)	Tyra Gittens (TTO)	Texas A&M	6285	1056; 13.46	1029; 1.84 m (6 ft 1/4 in)	748; 13.31 m (43 ft 8 in)	1001; 23.79	1053; 6.64 m (21 ft 9 1/4 in)	691; 41.24 m (135 ft 3 1/2 in)	707; 2:28.88
2nd place, silver medalist(s)	Michelle Atherley (USA)	Miami	6067	1102; 13.15	916; 1.75 m (5 ft 8 3/4 in)	654; 11.90 m (39 ft 1/2 in)	983; 23.98	816; 5.89 m (19 ft 3 3/4 in)	662; 39.74 m (130 ft 4 1/2 in)	934; 2:12.13
3rd place, bronze medalist(s)	Kristine Blazevica (LAT)}	Texas	5984 PB	987; 13.94	916; 1.75 m (5 ft 8 3/4 in)	741; 13.21 m (43 ft 4 in)	857; 25.33	874; 6.08 m (19 ft 11 1/4 in)	695; 41.46 m (136 ft 1/4 in)	914; 2:13.51
4	Erin Marsh (USA)	Duke	5924 PB	1097; 13.18	879; 1.72 m (5 ft 7 1/2 in)	685; 12.36 m (40 ft 6 1/2 in)	990; 23.90	792; 5.81 m (19 ft 1/2 in)	568; 34.82 m (114 ft 2 3/4 in)	913; 2:13.54
5	Ida Eikeng (NOR)	Washington	5920 PB	1069; 13.37	806; 1.66 m (5 ft 5 1/4 in)	834; 14.60 m (47 ft 10 3/4 in)	963; 24.19	750; 5.67 m (18 ft 7 in)	859; 49.92 m (163 ft 9 1/4 in)	639; 2:34.34
6	Madeline Nickal (USA)	Pennsylvania State	5864	991; 13.91	771; 1.63 m (5 ft 4 in)	764; 13.55 m (44 ft 5 1/4 in)	892; 24.94	937; 6.28 m (20 ft 7 in)	622; 37.63 m (123 ft 5 1/4 in)	887; 2:15.39
7	Asya Reynolds (USA)	Georgia	5754	1024; 13.68	736; 1.60 m (5 ft 2 3/4 in)	736; 13.13 m (43 ft 3/4 in)	943; 24.40	856; 6.02 m (19 ft 9 in)	589; 35.92 m (117 ft 10 in)	870; 2:16.59
8	Beatrice Juskeviciute (LTU)	Cornell	5694	959; 14.14	806; 1.66 m (5 ft 5 1/4 in)	772; 13.67 m (44 ft 10 in)	870; 25.18	712; 5.54 m (18 ft 2 in)	737; 43.62 m (143 ft 1 1/4 in)	838; 2:18.95
9	Shayla Broughton (USA)	Mississippi State	5652	1074; 13.34	842; 1.69 m (5 ft 6 1/2 in)	702; 12.62 m (41 ft 4 3/4 in)	884; 25.03	890; 6.13 m (20 ft 1 1/4 in)	553; 34.03 m (111 ft 7 3/4 in)	707; 2:28.87
10	Allie Jones (USA)	Stanford	5623	1069; 13.37	806; 1.66 m (5 ft 5 1/4 in)	608; 11.20 m (36 ft 8 3/4 in)	949; 24.33	774; 5.75 m (18 ft 10 1/4 in)	542; 33.46 m (109 ft 9 1/4 in)	875; 2:16.25
11	Jadin O'Brien (USA)	Notre Dame	5545	964; 14.10	771; 1.63 m (5 ft 4 in)	678; 12.26 m (40 ft 2 1/2 in)	879; 25.08	822; 5.91 m (19 ft 4 1/2 in)	534; 33.03 m (108 ft 4 1/4 in)	897; 2:14.69
12	Lyndsey Lopes (USA)	Washington	5542	1021; 13.70	806; 1.66 m (5 ft 5 1/4 in)	600; 11.07 m (36 ft 3 3/4 in)	937; 24.46	726; 5.59 m (18 ft 4 in)	619; 37.47 m (122 ft 11 in)	833; 2:19.28
13	Kaitlin Smith (USA)	Houston Baptist	5520	1027; 13.66	806; 1.66 m (5 ft 5 1/4 in)	620; 11.38 m (37 ft 4 in)	856; 25.34	786; 5.79 m (18 ft 11 3/4 in)	535; 33.07 m (108 ft 5 3/4 in)	890; 2:15.19
14	Kaylee Hinton (USA)	Texas Tech	5498	1015; 13.74	916; 1.75 m (5 ft 8 3/4 in)	579; 10.76 m (35 ft 3 1/2 in)	928; 24.56	694; 5.48 m (17 ft 11 1/2 in)	530; 32.82 m (107 ft 8 in)	836; 2:19.08
15	Lauren Taubert (USA)	Kansas State	5436	1023; 13.69	806; 1.66 m (5 ft 5 1/4 in)	601; 11.09 m (36 ft 4 1/2 in)	909; 24.76	694; 5.48 m (17 ft 11 1/2 in)	535; 33.09 m (108 ft 6 3/4 in)	868; 2:16.80
16	Ariel Okorie (USA)	Kansas State	5420	1031; 13.63	771; 1.63 m (5 ft 4 in)	641; 11.69 m (38 ft 4 in)	869; 25.20	768; 5.73 m (18 ft 9 1/2 in)	598; 36.37 m (119 ft 3 3/4 in)	742; 2:26.16
17	Zoe Hughes (GBR)	Duke	5385	946; 14.23	701; 1.57 m (5 ft 1 3/4 in)	735; 13.11 m (43 ft 0 in)	852; 25.38	813; 5.88 m (19 ft 3 1/4 in)	502; 31.34 m (102 ft 9 3/4 in)	836; 2:19.11
18	Jenny Kimbro (USA)	Iowa	5381	1007; 13.80	736; 1.60 m (5 ft 2 3/4 in)	659; 11.97 m (39 ft 3 1/4 in)	889; 24.98	665; 5.38 m (17 ft 7 3/4 in)	590; 35.97 m (118 ft 0 in)	835; 2:19.16
19	Callie Jones (USA)	Texas Tech	5270	942; 14.26	701; 1.57 m (5 ft 1 3/4 in)	573; 10.66 m (34 ft 11 1/2 in)	831; 25.62	717; 5.56 m (18 ft 2 3/4 in)	785; 46.10 m (151 ft 2 3/4 in)	721; 2:27.79
20	Emma Nwofor (GBR)	Ohio State	5208	1043; 13.55	842; 1.69 m (5 ft 6 1/2 in)	613; 11.27 m (36 ft 11 1/2 in)	855; 25.35	674; 5.41 m (17 ft 8 3/4 in)	768; 45.22 m (148 ft 4 1/4 in)	413; 2:55.01
21	Skylar Sieben (CAN)	Arizona	4736	970; 14.06	0 NM	666; 12.07 m (39 ft 7 in)	869; 25.20	744; 5.65 m (18 ft 6 1/4 in)	670; 40.13 m (131 ft 7 3/4 in)	817; 2:20.47
—	Natosha Jordan (USA)	Auburn	DNF	956; 14.16	842; 1.69 m (5 ft 6 1/2 in)	653; 11.87 m (38 ft 11 1/4 in)	862; 25.27	753; 5.68 m (18 ft 7 1/2 in)	441; 28.11 m (92 ft 2 1/2 in)	0 DNS
—	Grace McKenzie (IRL)	McNeese State	DNF	895; 14.60	771; 1.63 m (5 ft 4 in)	549; 10.30 m (33 ft 9 1/2 in)	0 DNS	0 DNS	0 DNS	0 DNS
—	Nicola Ader (GER)	Nevada	DNF	932; 14.33	806; 1.66 m (5 ft 5 1/4 in)	598; 11.04 m (36 ft 2 1/2 in)	0 DNS	0 DNS	0 DNS	0 DNS

- Results from Flash Results.

== Standings ==
=== Men ===
- Only top ten teams shown

Rank	Team	Score	Notes
1st place, gold medalist(s)	LSU	84	
2nd place, silver medalist(s)	Oregon	53	
3rd place, bronze medalist(s)	North Carolina A&T	35	
4	Florida	34.5	
5	USC	33	
6	Texas	29	
6	Texas A&M	29	
8	Georgia	25	
9	Arizona State	24	
10	Florida State	23.5	

=== Women ===
- Only top ten teams shown

Rank	Team	Score	Notes
1st place, gold medalist(s)	USC	74	
2nd place, silver medalist(s)	Texas A&M	63	
3rd place, bronze medalist(s)	Georgia	37.5	
4	North Carolina A&T	31	
4	Alabama	31	
6	LSU	28.5	
7	Florida	28	
7	Texas	28	
9	Arizona State	22	
10	Brigham Young	20	

== See also ==
- NCAA Division I Men's Outdoor Track and Field Championships
- NCAA Division I Women's Outdoor Track and Field Championships
- 2021 NCAA Division I Indoor Track and Field Championships
