= Patrick Dever =

British long-distance runner (born 1996)

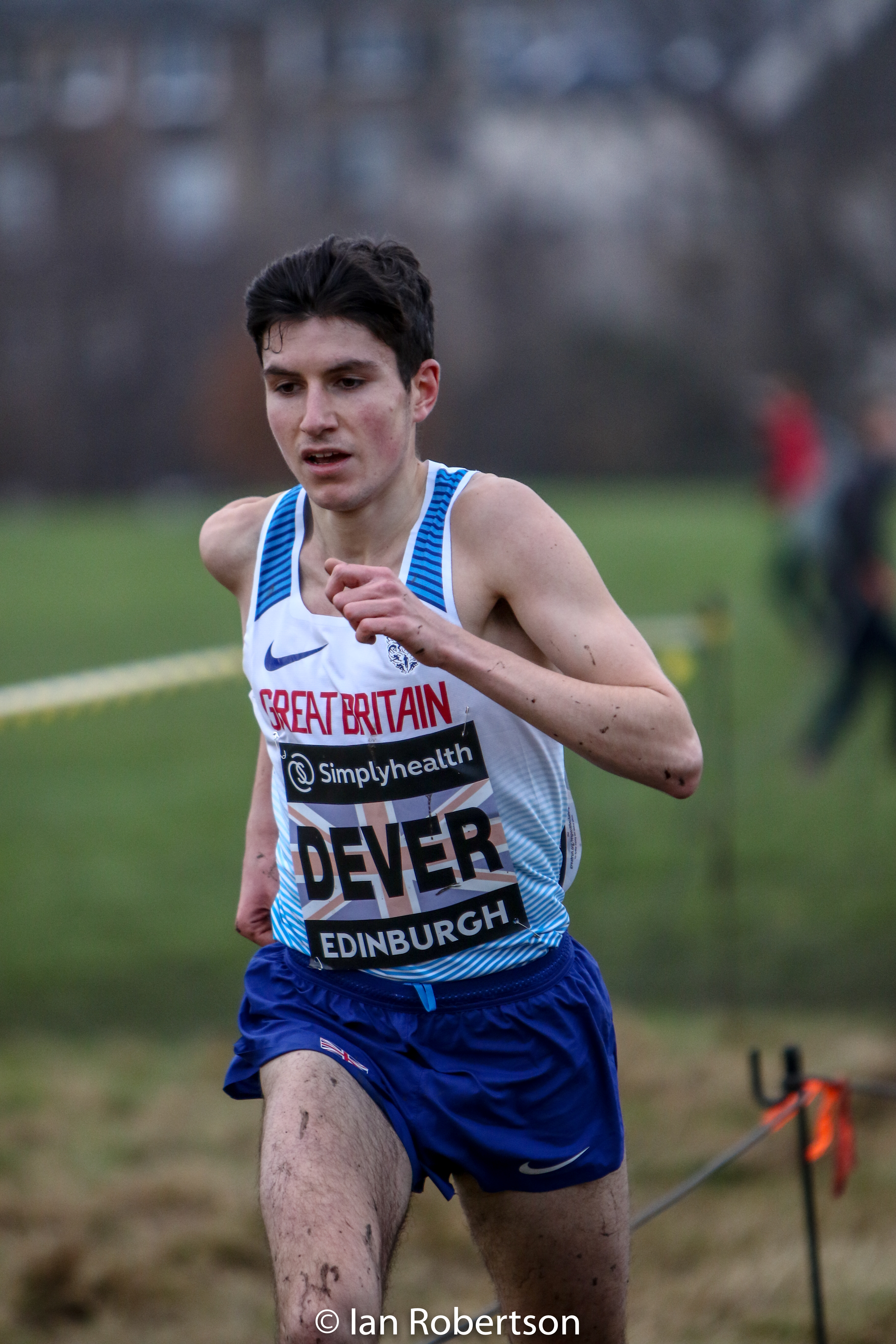
- Dever in 2018

Personal information
- Nationality: British (English)
- Born: 5 September 1996 (age 29) Preston, Lancashire, England
- Education: University of Tulsa

Sport
- Sport: Long-distance running
- Event(s): 5000 m, 10000 m
- College team: Tulsa Golden Hurricane
- Club: Puma Elite Running Team
- Turned pro: 2021
- Coached by: Alistair Cragg
Medal record
Bronze medal – third place	2025 New York	Marathon

Patrick Dever (born 5 September 1996) is a British long-distance runner. He won the 2021 British Athletics Championships over 5000 metres and the NCAA Championships over 10,000 metres in 2021. He competed at the 2024 Olympic Games. On 26 April 2026, he clocked 2:06:18 at the TCS London Marathon, making him the third-fastest British male in history.

== Collegiate career ==
Dever attended and competed for the University of Tulsa for two years while working on his master's degree in accounting. He left Tulsa as a two time All-American in both cross country and track and field. On June 9, 2021, Dever won the NCAA national championship 10,000m in a meet record of 27:41.87, narrowly edging out Conner Mantz, and Abdihamid Nur by less than a second.

== Professional career ==
On October 25, 2021, Dever announced via an Instagram post that he has signed a professional running contract with Puma. Dever trains with Puma Elite under coach Alistair Cragg.

He ran a personal best in the 10,000 metres of 27:08.81 in San Juan Capistrano, California in March 2024 to move to second on the UK all-time list. After becoming the 2024 British champion (by finishing as the highest placed British athlete at the night of the 10,000 PB's), Dever was subsequently named in the Great Britain team for the 2024 Summer Olympics, where he failed to make it to the final of the 5000m.

In January 2025, he moved to fourth on the UK half-marathon all-time list after his fifth place finish in Texas at the Houston half marathon in a time of 60:11. He finished second overall at the Boston 5k road race in Boston, Massachusetts on 19 April 2025 in a time of 13:35.

On 2 November 2025, Dever finished fourth in the New York City Marathon in a time of two hours, eight minutes and 58 seconds. He was later upgraded to bronze due to a doping ban against the original third-place finisher, Albert Korir.

== Personal life ==
He is from Preston, Lancashire.

== Results and personal records ==
Taken from World Athletics profile.

Championship Results

Year	Meet	Venue	Event	Place	Time	Notes
2016	European Cross Country Championships	Chia, Italy	7.97 km	49th	24:29	U23 Race
2017	British Athletics Championships	Alexander Stadium	1500m	11th	3:51.56	
2017	European Cross Country Championships	Šamorín, Slovakia	8.23 km	16th	25:02	U23 Race
2018	European Cross Country Championships	Tilburg, Netherlands	8.3 km	5th	24:05	U23 Race
2019	British Indoor Athletics Championships	Arena Birmingham	3000m	5th	8:00.83	
2019	European Cross Country Championships	Lisbon, Portugal	10.3 km	25th	31:29	
2021	NCAA Outdoor Track and Field Championships	Hayward Field	10,000m	1st	27:41.87	Meet Record
2021	NCAA Outdoor Track and Field Championships	Hayward Field	5000m	6th	13:19.85	
2021	British Athletics Championships	Manchester Regional Arena	5000m	1st	13:37.30	
2022	British Athletics Championships	Manchester Regional Arena	5000m	5th	13:47.46	
2022	World Athletics Championships	Hayward Field	10,000m	23rd	29:13.88	
2022	Commonwealth Games	Alexander Stadium	5000m	7th	13:22.10	
2022	European Athletics Championships	Olympiastadion	5000m	21st	13:45.89	

Personal Records

Surface	Event	Time	Date	Venue
Indoor track	3000m	7:43.57	January 30, 2022	Boston University
Outdoor track	1500m	3:41.18	May 16, 2021	Tampa Bay, Florida
Outdoor track	One mile	3:58.62	July 24, 2021	Loughborough, GBR
Outdoor track	3000m	7:37.39	July 13, 2021	Gateshead International Stadium
Outdoor track	5000m	13:19.85	June 11, 2021	Hayward Field
Outdoor track	10,000m	27:08.81	March 16, 2024	San Juan Capistrano, California
Road	Half marathon	1:00:11	January 19, 2025	Houston, Texas
Road	Marathon	2:06:18	April 26, 2026	London, United Kingdom
