= Alex Masai =

Kenyan long-distance runner (born 1997)

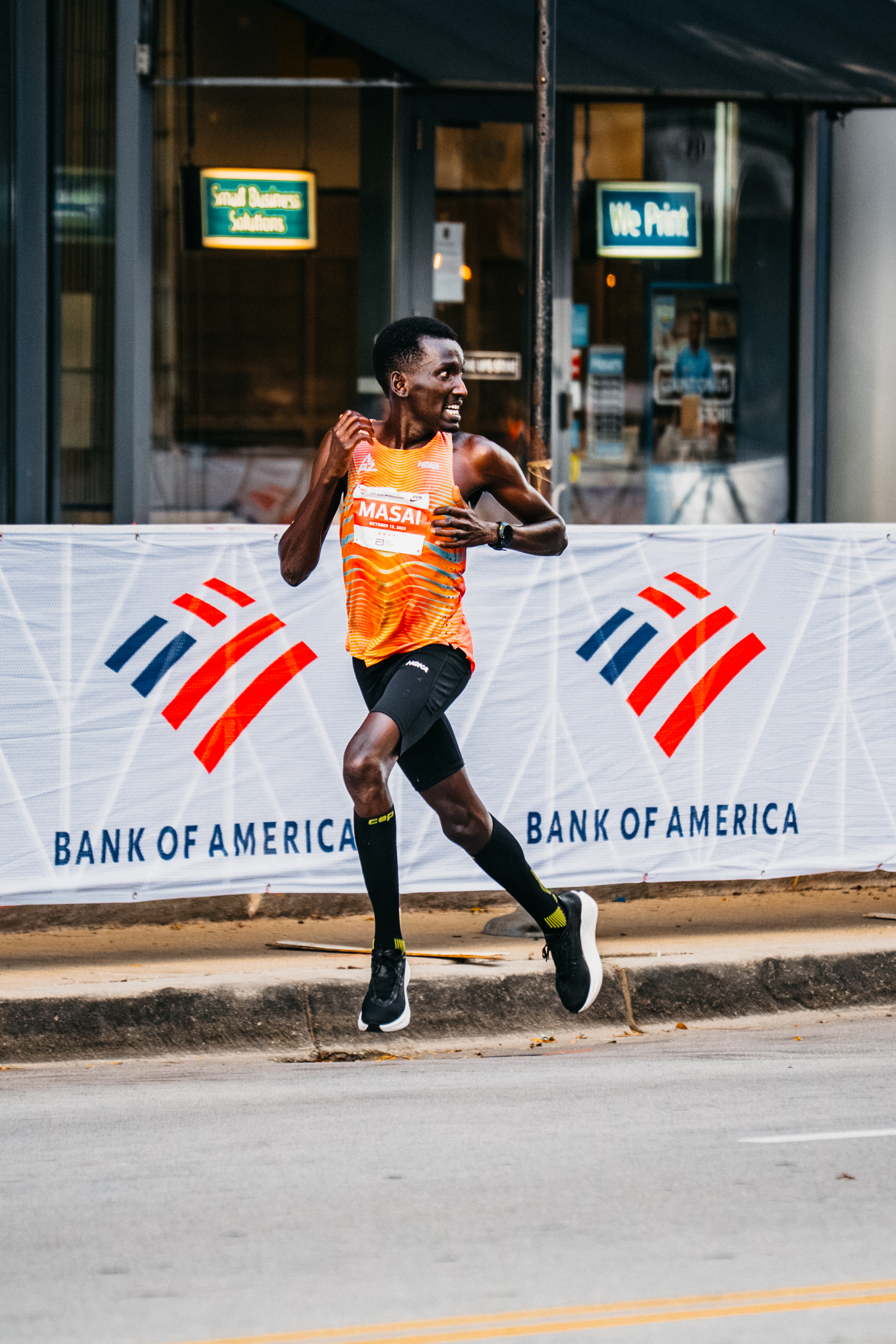
- Alex Masai at mile 25 of the 2025 Chicago Marathon before finishing 3rd overall.

Personal information
- Born: 5 February 1997 (age 29)
- Home town: Kitale, Kenya and Eldoret, Kenya
- Education: Mang'u High School; Moi University; Monroe College; Hofstra University
- Height: 171 cm (5 ft 7 in)
- Weight: 57 kg (126 lb)

Sport
- Country: United States
- Sport: Sport of athletics
- Event(s): 5000 metres 10000 metres
- College team: Monroe Mustangs; Hofstra Pride
- Club: HOKA One One

Achievements and titles
- National finals: 2021 NCAA XC; • 10km XC, 32nd; 2021 NCAAs; • 10,000m, 6th; • 5000m, 10th
- Personal bests: 5000m: 13:18.96 (2024); 10,000m: 27:42.80 (2023); Marathon: 2:04:37 (2025)
Medal record
World Marathon Majors
| Bronze medal – third place | 2025 Chicago | Marathon |
- Updated on July 2024

Alex Chesiro Masai (born 5 February 1997) is a Kenyan long-distance runner based in the United States. After initially specializing in the 5000 metres, he debuted in the marathon in 2024 to finish 9th at the 2024 Chicago Marathon. He is the brother of Olympians Moses Masai and Linet Masai, and he finished 6th at the 2021 NCAA Division I Outdoor Track and Field Championships in the 5000 m. At the 2025 Chicago Marathon, he finished in 3rd.

== Career ==
Masai initially ran for Mang'u High School in Kenya, winning district cross country running championships in 2012 and 2013. He was recruited to the Monroe Mustangs track and field program where he finished 8th at the 2017 NJCAA national cross country championships. In 2018, Masai transferred to join the Hofstra Pride track and field team in the NCAA Division I.

In 2020, Masai qualified for the 2020 NCAA Division I Indoor Track and Field Championships with a 13:28 5000 metres clocking, but the championships were canceled due to the COVID-19 pandemic. Running unattached that fall, Masai set personal bests in the mile and 10,000 m. The following year, Masai qualified for the 2021 NCAA outdoor championships in two events, finishing 10th and 6th in the 5000 m and 10,000 metres respectively. Masai finished 32nd at the 2021 NCAA Division I Cross Country Championships individually. Masai credited his success to switching between altitude training in Eldoret and sea-level training in Hempstead, New York.

In August 2021, Masai signed with the HOKA One One Northern Arizona Elite professional running group.

During the 2024 indoor season, Masai set a personal best of 13:18.16 for 5000 m. Making his debut at the 2024 Chicago Marathon, Masai placed 9th in 2:08:51. Masai finished 3rd at the 2025 Chicago Marathon with a time of 2:04:37.

== Personal life ==
Masai is from Kitale, Kenya and Eldoret, Kenya. He attended Mang'u High School in Thika, Kenya where he played handball and ran track, often training with his sister. Masai originally attended Moi University for college, without participating in sports. After he moved to the U.S., he majored in criminal justice at Monroe College before transferring to Hofstra University.

His brother is Moses Masai, who finished 4th in the 2008 Olympic 10K and 12th in the 2012 Olympic 10K. His older sister Linet Masai also runs professionally and has represented Kenya at the Olympics. He has a second sister, Maggie Masai, who is a 2:22 marathon runner.

== Statistics ==
=== Personal best progression ===
5000m progression
| # | Mark | Pl. | Competition | Venue | Date | Ref. |
|---|---|---|---|---|---|---|
| 1 | 14:06.61 | 1st place, gold medalist(s) | Bison Outdoor Classic | Lewisburg, PA | 14 Apr 2018 | |
| 2 | 14:00.07 | (bronze) (Round 1) | Penn Relays | Philadelphia, PA | 25 Apr 2018 | |
| 3 | 13:53.65 | 1st place, gold medalist(s) | Boston University Last Chance Qualifier | Boston, MA | 23 Feb 2019 | |
| 4 | 13:28.55 | (bronze) (Round B) | Boston University Last Chance Invitational | Boston, MA | 27 Feb 2020 | |
| 5 | 13:24.68 | 10th | NCAA Championships | Eugene, OR | 10 Jun 2021 | |
| 6 | 13:22.53 | 11th (Round 2) | Boston University David Hemery Valentine Invitational | Boston, MA | 11 Feb 2022 | |
| 7 | 13:18.96 | 6th | Boston University David Hemery Valentine Invitational | Boston, MA | 9 Feb 2024 | |
