= Tulsa Golden Hurricane =

University of Tulsa, Oklahoma athletic teams

- University: University of Tulsa
- Nickname: Golden Hurricane
- NCAA: Division I (FBS)
- Conference: American; Big 12 (women's rowing)
- Athletic director: Justin Moore
- Location: Tulsa, Oklahoma
- Varsity teams: 18
- Football stadium: Skelly Field at H. A. Chapman Stadium (30,000)
- Basketball arena: Reynolds Center
- Other venues: Hurricane Soccer & Track Stadium; Michael D. Case Tennis Center; Donna J. Hardesty Sports and Recreation Complex
- Colors: Old gold, royal blue, and crimson
- Mascot: Gus T.
- Fight song: Hurricane Fight Song
- Website: tulsahurricane.com

American logo in Tulsa's colors

The Tulsa Golden Hurricane are the athletic teams that represent the University of Tulsa. These teams are referred to as the Tulsa Golden Hurricane (or variously as TU or Tulsa). Before adopting the name Golden Hurricane in 1922, the University of Tulsa (TU) had many unofficial team nicknames including Kendallites (from TU's predecessor institution Henry Kendall College), Presbyterians (from the university's founding by the Presbyterian Church), Tulsans, Tigers, Orange and Black, and Yellow Jackets. The name "Golden Tornadoes" was chosen by TU football coach H.M. Archer (1922–24) based on new gold and black uniforms (rather than the previous orange and black) and a remark made during practice of the team "roaring through opponents" (during a season when TU went undefeated, including wins over Texas A&M and the University of Arkansas). However, it was quickly discovered that the same name had been chosen in 1917 by Georgia Tech. Archer then substituted the term "hurricane" for "tornado" and a team vote prior to leaving for the game against Texas A&M confirmed the official nickname as "Golden Hurricane".

== Conference affiliations ==
NCAA

- Missouri Valley Conference (1935–1996)
- Western Athletic Conference (1996–2005)
- Conference USA (2005–2014)
- American Conference (2014–present)

== Varsity sports ==
Men's sports	Women's sports
Baseball	
Basketball	Basketball
Cross country	Cross country
Football	Golf
Golf (to be reinstated in 2026–27)	Rowing
Soccer	Soccer
Tennis	Softball
Track and field^{†}	Tennis
	Track and field^{†}
	Volleyball
† – Track and field includes both indoor and outdoor.

The Tulsa Golden Hurricane is a member of the American Conference (American). The Golden Hurricane were members of Conference USA from 2005 to 2014, winning 40 conference championships, including 16 postseason titles and nine regular season crowns (including three West Division titles). It's the most CUSA titles (Rice is second with 16) since the league realigned in 2005–06. It was a member of the Western Athletic Conference from 1996–2004 and the Missouri Valley Conference from 1935 to 1996. In 1985, the MVC dropped football so Tulsa participated as an Independent in football, but remained as an MVC member in other sports, including basketball. Prior to 1935, Tulsa was a member of several conferences.

On April 2, 2013, Tulsa announced that in July 2014 it would leave CUSA for the Big East Conference, which would rename itself the following day as the American Athletic Conference (since renamed American Conference).

With the American dropping women's rowing at the end of the 2023–24 season, Tulsa became an affiliate of the Big 12 Conference in that sport.

Tulsa has won six national championships (three NCAA): four in women's golf and two in men's basketball. The University of Tulsa currently fields a varsity team in eight men's sports and ten women's sports.

=== Football ===
Tulsa has the smallest undergraduate enrollment of all schools that participate in NCAA Division I FBS football. The football team was most recently coached by Kevin Wilson, He replaced Philip Montgomery, who replaced Bill Blankenship, who replaced Todd Graham who had replaced Steve Kragthorpe, who led the team to three bowl games in four seasons before accepting the head coaching job at the University of Louisville after the 2006 season. Graham, a former Tulsa defensive coordinator, returned to the team after serving as the head coach at Rice University for one season.

Tulsa has appeared in five bowl games between the 2003 and 2008 seasons, including four straight: the 2005 Liberty Bowl, 2006 Armed Forces Bowl, 2008 GMAC Bowl, and 2009 GMAC Bowl. Tulsa's football teams have appeared in a total of 16 bowl games and Tulsa was the first university to play in five straight New Year's Day bowl games: the 1942 Sun Bowl, 1943 Sugar Bowl, 1944 Sugar Bowl, 1945 Orange Bowl, and 1946 Oil Bowl. Tulsa football finished the 1991 season ranked 21st in the nation by the Associated Press and USA Today/Coaches polls. During the 2008 season Tulsa football was ranked as high as 19th nationally by the AP poll, and 18th in both the BCS rankings and USA Today/Coaches poll. Tulsa also led all Division I FBS schools in total offense in 2008 (7,978 yds) and in 2007 (7,832 yds). Tulsa football finished the 2010 season ranked 24th in the Associated Press poll and finished the 2012 season ranked 25th in the USA Today/Coaches poll.

The University of Tulsa has three Pro Football Hall of Fame inductees. Steve Largent and the late Jim Finks were members of the 1995 class, while Bob St. Clair was a 1990 inductee. TU shares the lead for the most NFL Hall of Famers among the Division I FBS football schools in the state of Oklahoma. The University of Tulsa can also take much of the credit for developing the passing game in collegiate football in the 1960s. Tulsa led the nation in passing in 1962, 1963, 1964, 1965 and 1966. Quarterbacks Jerry Rhome (1964) and Billy Guy Anderson (1965) and receiver Howard Twilley (1964–65) set most of the NCAA passing and receiving records, some of which still stand today.

=== Basketball ===
The Tulsa Golden Hurricane basketball program has had a history of success, including NIT championships in 1981 and 2001, an Elite Eight appearance in 2000, three Sweet Sixteen appearances, and 14 trips to the Big Dance. The Golden Hurricane have a long-standing basketball rivalry with Oral Roberts Golden Eagles. The two teams have exchanged a traveling trophy, the Mayor's Cup. Tulsa players Steve Bracey and Jordan Clarkson went on to win NBA Championships, and Jim King went on to become an NBA All Star.

Tulsa is also known for developing many coaches who have gone on to great success in the NCAA, including former High Point coach Tubby Smith, who won a national championship while he coached at the University of Kentucky, Kansas' Bill Self, and one of Arkansas' most notable former coaches, Nolan Richardson, who is the only head coach to win the NJCAA tournament (with Western Texas Junior College), the NIT (with Tulsa), and the NCAA tournament (with Arkansas). The current men's basketball head coach is Eric Konkol.

In 2006, the Tulsa women's basketball team earned its first appearance in the NCAA tournament by winning Conference USA's regular-season and tournament championships. The Golden Hurricane's accomplishment came after back-to-back 19-win seasons and WNIT appearances in 2004 and 2005. Tulsa also appeared in the 2002 WNIT, making it to the second round.

=== Men's soccer ===
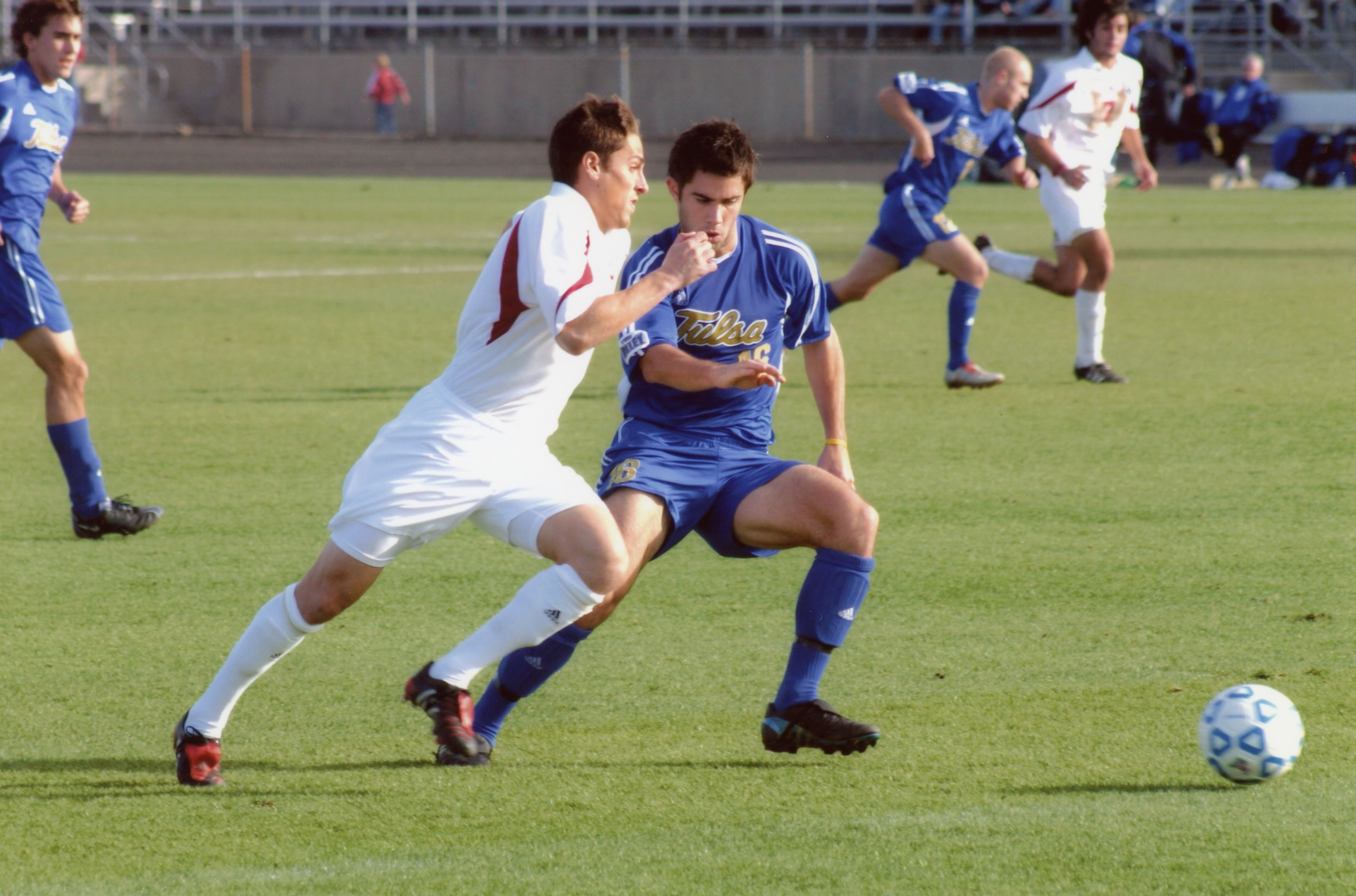
Tulsa faces eventual champion Indiana in the regional finals of the 2004 NCAA Men's Soccer Championship

The Tulsa Men's Soccer team has a strong history since it became a varsity sport in 1980. TU has won four conference championships (1991 MVC, 2007, 2008, 2009 C-USA) and eight conference tournaments (1991 MVC, 2007, 2008, 2009, 2012 C-USA, 2014, 2015, 2016 AAC). Tulsa holds the NCAA record for both consecutive home wins and consecutive home games without a loss, set during the same stretch of 39 games from 1988 to 1992. The Golden Hurricane has twice reached the elite-eight of the NCAA Men's Soccer Championship, falling to eventual champion Indiana in 2004 and top seeded Akron in 2009. Tulsa has participated in 11 NCAA tournaments (1991, 2003, 2004, 2007, 2008, 2009, 2010, 2012, 2014, 2015, 2016) and has been frequently ranked in the top 25. The school has produced first team All-American, Ryan Pore, who played for the Portland Timbers, and Kansas City Wizards of Major League Soccer. Terry Boss of Seattle Sounders FC and Lawson Vaughn of D.C. United are former Golden Hurricane currently playing in MLS. Dominic Cervi plays for Celtic F.C. of Glasgow, Scotland, and fellow goalkeeper Tyrel Lacey has signed with FC Lyn Oslo of Oslo, Norway. Since 1995, the head coach has been Tom McIntosh, a prominent figure in Tulsa soccer for over 20 years. The team plays in the Hurricane Soccer & Track Stadium.

=== Tennis ===
The Golden Hurricane Tennis program has string of success, including men's Missouri Valley championships in 1995 and 1996, men's Conference USA championships in 2006, 2007, 2008, 2009, and 2011 and women's Conference USA championships in 2007, 2008, 2010, and 2011. In 2007, Tulsa's top-ranked player Arnau Brugués-Davi ranked as high as #1 in the nation and a four time All-American, advanced to the quarterfinals of the singles competition at the NCAA Men's Tennis Championship, improving on his 2006 round of sixteen appearance. The University of Tulsa also boasts one of the nation's top tennis facilities, the Michael D. Case Tennis Center, which was host to the 2004 and 2008 NCAA tennis championships.

=== Women's golf ===
TU has won four team national titles in women's golf: the 1980 and 1982 AIAW titles and the 1982 and 1988 NCAA titles, with the 1988 title later vacated. Golfers Nancy Lopez (1976), Kathy Baker (1982 AIAW), and Melissa McNamara (1988) have won individual national titles. Other notable Golden Hurricane female golfers are Stacy Prammanasudh and Kelly Robbins. The team has won 12 conference championships:

- Missouri Valley Conference (3): 1994–96
- Western Athletic Conference (7): 1999–2005
- Conference USA (2): 2008, 2012

=== Men's golf ===
The men's golf team has won 11 conference championships: Men's golf was dropped after the 2015–16 season, but will be reinstated in 2026–27.

- Missouri Valley Conference (8): 1982, 1987–88, 1990–91, 1994–96
- Western Athletic Conference (2): 2002, 2005 (co-champions)
- Conference USA (1): 2007

=== Baseball ===
Tulsa's baseball team played in the College World Series twice, finishing in second and third place. In 1969 the Golden Hurricane made it to the final game of the double-elimination tournament before losing to Arizona State. First baseman Steve Caves and third baseman Les Rogers were named to the all-tournament team. In 1971 Tulsa lasted until the next-to-last game of the tournament before being eliminated. First baseman Jerry Tabb was named the tournament's most valuable player; pitcher Steve Rogers and outfielder Steve Bowling were also named to the all-tournament team. Tulsa held the number one ranking in the polls for part of the 1972 season before being knocked out of that year's playoffs at the district level.

Of the Tulsa baseball players who later played in the major leagues, the most successful was Steve Rogers, who pitched for 12 years with the Montreal Expos and was selected to five All-Star teams. Other Hurricanes who played in the majors included Bud Bloomfield, Steve Bowling, Mark Calvert, Mardie Cornejo, Mike Sember, and Jerry Tabb.

Tulsa dropped its baseball program in 1980, citing rising costs and the need to fund a full women's sports program. Gene Shell, who had coached the program from 1965 to 1980, finished his career at Tulsa with a 478–199 record, and was the fourth winningest coach in college baseball when the program ended. In recent years, the university has been reported on several occasions to be considering whether to restore the baseball program; a formal study was conducted in 2009 after the Tulsa Drillers moved into their new downtown stadium, leaving Drillers Stadium potentially available for college baseball, but the school concluded that the financial demands of adding a new sport were more than it could accept.

=== Other sports ===
The Golden Hurricane softball team won Conference USA regular season and tournament championships in 2006 and 2009. The men's golf team won the Conference USA championship in 2007.

=== Mascot ===
From 1994 to 2009, Tulsa's mascot was Captain 'Cane, an anthropomorphized golden hurricane with human attributes such as biceps, clothes, and a perpetual smirk. This representation of Captain 'Cane was named by Fox Sports as the second worst mascot in the country. From 1977 to 1994, the mascot was known as Hurc or Huffy. In 2009, Captain Cane was redesigned as a human superhero with the power to summon weather.

== Championships ==
As of July 2, 2015, Tulsa has 3 team national championships (one NCAA and two AIAW titles), all in women's golf. During the one year of overlapping dual NCAA and AIAW championships (1981–82), Tulsa was the only school to win both championships in one sport.

=== NCAA team championships ===
Tulsa has won one NCAA team national championship.

- Women's (1)
  - NCAA Golf (1): 1982

=== Other team championships ===
- Women's (2)
  - AIAW Golf (2): 1980, 1982

See also:

- American Athletic Conference NCAA team championships
- List of NCAA schools with the most NCAA Division I championships
