= Michael D. Case Tennis Center =

Tennis arena in Tulsa, Oklahoma

Coordinates: 36°9′0″N 95°56′59″W

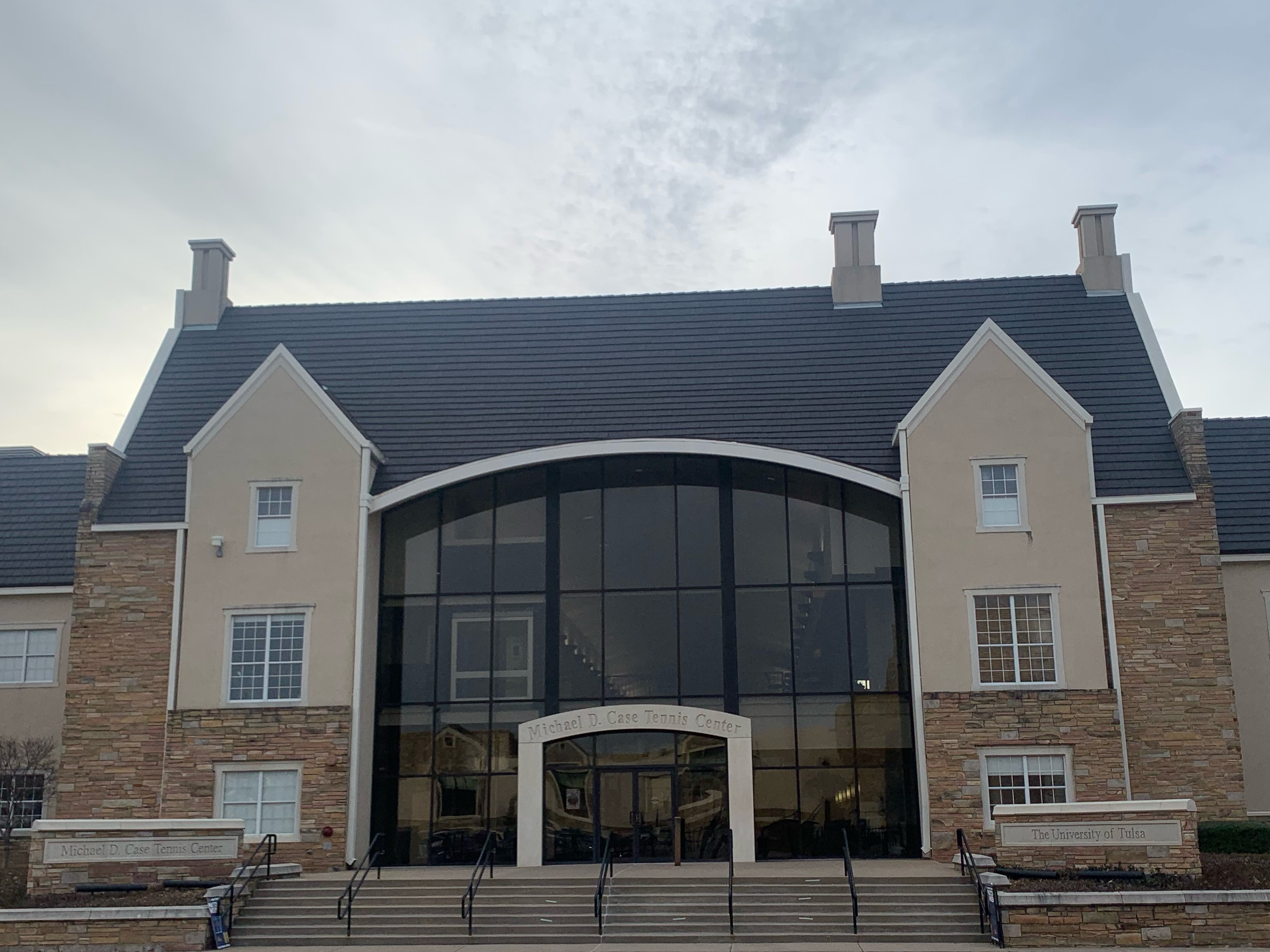
The Michael D Case Tennis Center in 2023

The Michael D. Case Tennis Center is a 2,000-seat tennis arena on the campus of the University of Tulsa in Tulsa, Oklahoma. The center officially opened on December 14, 2001 and was named after Mike Case, a local developer and philanthropist . In 2003, the facility was named the top facility in the country by the United States Tennis Association.

The center cost $10 million. It contains six indoor courts, 12 outdoor courts, electronic scoreboards, spectator seating for 2,000, lighting for night competition and training facilities. There are also webcams around the facility that allow matches to be streamed over the internet.

The facility has hosted the 2002 WAC Championship and two national NCAA tournaments. It will also soon host the combined Men's and Women's Division I Championships. The facility has also benefited for the athletes at the university. Before opening, the highest ranking Tulsa had for a men's program was 31. In 2007, they achieved a ranking of 16 and also have the third ranked player nationally as of January 2008. Recently, another donor, Tom Kivisto, provided money to add sun cover to the outdoor courts.
