= 1979 AIAW Outdoor Track and Field Championships =

U.S. women's athletics collegiate championship event

- Dates: May 23–26, 1979
- Host city: East Lansing, Michigan; Michigan State University
- Venue: Ralph Young Field
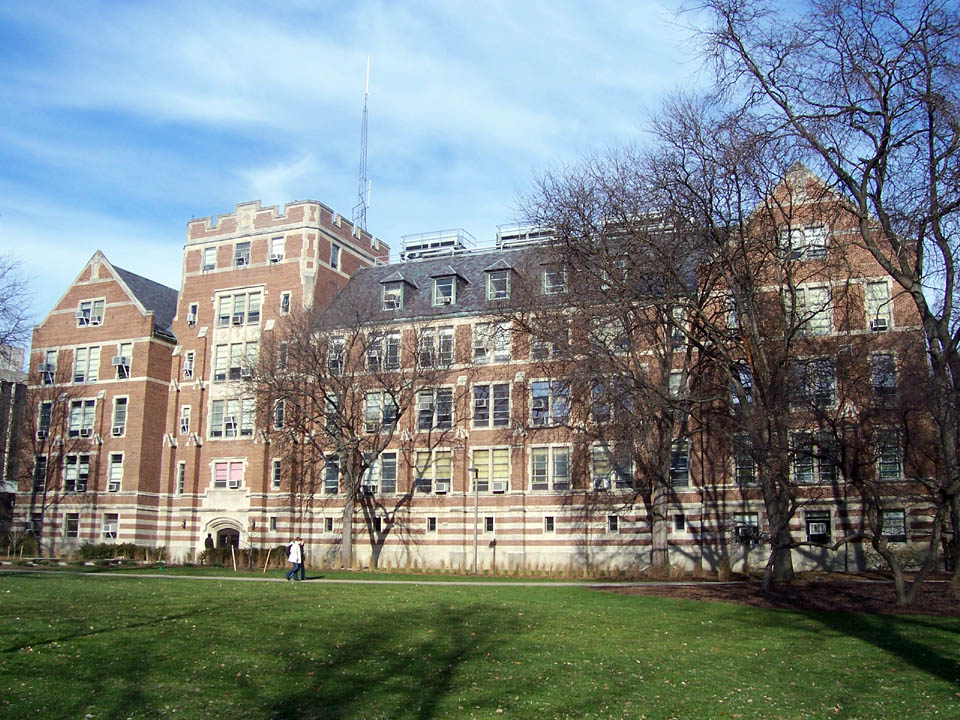

The 1979 AIAW Outdoor Track And Field Championships were the 11th annual Association for Intercollegiate Athletics for Women-sanctioned track meet to determine the individual and team national champions of women's collegiate outdoor track and field events in the United States. They were contested May 23−26, 1979 in East Lansing, Michigan by host Michigan State University. There were not separate AIAW Division I, II, and III championships for outdoor track and field until 1981.

The meet was marked by very windy and rainy weather. Nonetheless, on the final day of competition Louise Ritter broke her own American record in the high jump by clearing 6 ft 3 1/2 in (1.91 m). The Cal State Northridge Matadors won the team competition, separating themselves from the other teams about three fourths of the way through the competition.

== Team standings ==
- Scoring: 10 points for a 1st-place finish, 8 points for 2nd, 6 points for 3rd, 4 points for 4th, 2 points for 5th, and 1 point for 6th. Top 10 teams shown.

Rank	Team	Points
1st place, gold medalist(s)	Cal State Northridge Matadors	67
2nd place, silver medalist(s)	Arizona State Sun Devils	58
3rd place, bronze medalist(s)	Tennessee Volunteers	32
4th	Texas Woman's Pioneers	26
5th	Morgan State Lady Bears	23
6th	Cal State Los Angeles Golden Eagles	22
7th	Texas Longhorns	21
8th	Oregon Ducks	19
9th	New Mexico Lobos	18
9th	NC State Wolfpack	18

== Results ==
- Only results of finals are shown

100 m (+1.6 m/s)
Pl.	Name	Team	Mark
1st place, gold medalist(s)	Leleith Hodges	Texas Woman's Pioneers	11.81
2nd place, silver medalist(s)	Brenda Calhoun	Arizona State Sun Devils	11.93
2nd place, silver medalist(s)	Dollie Fleetwood	Cal State Los Angeles Golden Eagles	11.93
2nd place, silver medalist(s)	Lisa Thompson	UNLV Rebels	11.93
5th	Cheryl Gilliam	Michigan State Spartans	12.07
6th	Jodi Anderson	Cal State Northridge Matadors	12.14
7th	Melanie Batiste	Oregon Ducks	12.15
8th	Stephanie Hightower	Ohio State Buckeyes	12.31
9th	Gail Douglas	USC Trojans	12.80

200 m (+1.16 m/s)
Pl.	Name	Team	Mark
1st place, gold medalist(s)	Valerie Brisco	Cal State Northridge Matadors	23.61
2nd place, silver medalist(s)	Freida Cobbs	Arizona State Sun Devils	23.73
3rd place, bronze medalist(s)	Yolanda Rich	Cal State Los Angeles Golden Eagles	23.81
4th	Wanda Hooker	Memphis Tigers	23.84
5th	Liz Young	District of Columbia Firebirds	23.86
6th	Kelia Bolton	California Golden Bears	23.94
7th	Cheryl Gilliam	Michigan State Spartans	24.19
8th	Melanie Batiste	Oregon Ducks	24.37
	Gail Douglas	USC Trojans	DNS

400 m
Pl.	Name	Team	Mark
1st place, gold medalist(s)	Yolanda Rich	Cal State Los Angeles Golden Eagles	52.6
2nd place, silver medalist(s)	Liz Young	District of Columbia Firebirds	53.8
3rd place, bronze medalist(s)	Robbin Coleman	Texas Longhorns	53.9
4th	Paulette Clagon	Morgan State Lady Bears	54.2
5th	Elizabeth Crowder	UIC Flames	54.3
6th	Paula Clagon	Morgan State Lady Bears	54.4
7th	Lorna Forde	LIU Brooklyn Blackbirds	54.4
8th	Diann Ousley	Arkansas Razorbacks	54.6
9th	Gwen Murray	Pitt Panthers	55.5

800 m
Pl.	Name	Team	Mark
1st place, gold medalist(s)	Susan Vigil	New Mexico Lobos	2:04.1
2nd place, silver medalist(s)	Christine Mullen	Georgetown Hoyas	2:04.2
3rd place, bronze medalist(s)	Dana Glidden	Missouri Tigers	2:05.1
4th	Marcia Romesser	Cal State Northridge Matadors	2:05.6
5th	Doriane Lambelet	Villanova Wildcats	2:05.9
6th	Karel Jones	Hunter Hawks	2:08.0
7th	Robin Campbell	Florida Gators	2:10.0
8th	Carolyn Brinkley	District of Columbia Firebirds	2:10.0
9th	Siri Bjelland	Oklahoma Sooners	2:13.7

1500 m
Pl.	Name	Team	Mark
1st place, gold medalist(s)	Brenda Webb	Tennessee Volunteers	4:17.6
2nd place, silver medalist(s)	Brigid Leddy	Villanova Wildcats	4:18.5
3rd place, bronze medalist(s)	Margaret Groos	Virginia Cavaliers	4:22.3
4th	Suzie Houston	Wisconsin Badgers	4:23.2
5th	Janet Ensrud	St. Olaf Oles	4:23.3
6th	Debbie Vetter	Iowa State Cyclones	4:25.5
7th	Maggie Keyes	Cal Poly Mustangs	4:26.2
8th	Ellen Schmidt	Oregon Ducks	4:27.0
9th	Patty Murnane	Penn State Nittany Lions	4:27.7
10th	Joan Corbin	Seattle Pacific Falcons	4:30.5
11th	Jodi Rittenhouse	Arkansas Razorbacks	4:34.1
12th	Diane Vetter	Iowa State Cyclones	4:39.0

3000 m
Pl.	Name	Team	Mark
1st place, gold medalist(s)	Brenda Webb	Tennessee Volunteers	9:15.8
2nd place, silver medalist(s)	Julie Shea	NC State Wolfpack	9:20.0
3rd place, bronze medalist(s)	Joan Benoit	Bowdoin Polar Bears	9:21.4
4th	Catherine Mountain	Oregon Ducks	9:32.8
5th	Judi St. Hilaire	Vermont Catamounts	9:33.5
6th	Kelly Spatz	Michigan State Spartans	9:33.7
7th	Carrie Craven	Ohio State Buckeyes	9:34.6
8th	Joan Corbin	Seattle Pacific Falcons	9:34.6
9th	Renee Urish	Kansas State Wildcats	9:36.4
10th	Kathleen Mulrooney	Wisconsin Badgers	9:38.6
11th	Joy Hansen	Arizona Wildcats	9:38.6
12th	Lisa Berry	Michigan State Spartans	9:43.6
13th	Lauri Adams	Montana State Bobcats	9:45.3
14th	Mary Seybold	Iowa State Cyclones	9:52.3
15th	Lynn Jennings	Princeton Tigers	9:53.0
16th	Linda Broderick	UCLA Bruins	9:53.6
17th	Sarah Sweeney	UC Santa Barbara Gauchos	9:57.5
18th	Karin Vonberg	Middlebury Panthers	10:22.0

5000 m
Pl.	Name	Team	Mark
1st place, gold medalist(s)	Julie Shea	NC State Wolfpack	16:05.9
2nd place, silver medalist(s)	Kathy Mintie	Arizona State Sun Devils	16:16.8
3rd place, bronze medalist(s)	Jody Parker	Oregon Ducks	16:34.3
4th	Anna McCarthy	Morehead State Eagles	16:57.7
5th	Karin Vonberg	Middlebury Panthers	16:59.1
6th	Suzanne Richter	California Golden Bears	16:59.8
7th	Elizabeth Hartwich	St. Olaf Oles	17:01.9
8th	Martha Stinson	Missouri Tigers	17:03.1
9th	Marybeth Spencer	Wisconsin Badgers	17:06.8
10th	Martha Sartain	Texas A&M Aggies	17:19.0
11th	Norene Harrison	Ohio State Buckeyes	17:21.0
12th	Donna Cathje	Minnesota State Mavericks	17:23.0
13th	Deborah Ulian	Yale Bulldogs	17:23.6
14th	Kimberly Sharpe	NC State Wolfpack	17:25.8
15th	Rochelle Racette	Minnesota Golden Gophers	17:33.8
16th	Cheryl Kunkel	Wisconsin Badgers	17:35.7
17th	Brenda Cardin	Oregon State Beavers	17:36.6
18th	Pippa Holman	Rutgers Scarlet Knights	17:39.3
19th	Susan Arfmann	Oregon State Beavers	17:47.1
20th	Maureen Finhole	Kansas Jayhawks	17:58.6
21st	Cindy Sturm	Alabama Crimson Tide	18:13.2
22nd	Pamela Cox	California Golden Bears	18:34.3
	Lynne Hjelte	California Golden Bears	DNF

10,000 m
Pl.	Name	Team	Mark
1st place, gold medalist(s)	Joan Benoit	Bowdoin Polar Bears	33:40.7
2nd place, silver medalist(s)	Karen Bridges	Oklahoma Sooners	34:23.9
3rd place, bronze medalist(s)	Amy Lafoon	Colorado State Rams	34:24.0
4th	Karen Fitz	Kansas Jayhawks	34:27.3
5th	Janice Oehm	California Golden Bears	34:27.8
6th	Molly Morton	Oregon Ducks	34:28.5
7th	Anne Sullivan	Brown Bears	34:43.3
8th	Judy McCreery	Northern Colorado Bears	35:06.7
9th	Nancy Seeger	Rutgers Scarlet Knights	35:25.9
10th	Liz Berry	Penn State Nittany Lions	35:36.5
11th	Mary Walsh	Maryland Terrapins	35:51.5
12th	Laurie Hagopian	Cal Lutheran Regals	35:59.4
13th	Nathalie Hughes	Michigan State Spartans	36:14.1
14th	Cynthia Wadsworth	Michigan State Spartans	36:19.3
15th	Janet Norem	Penn State Nittany Lions	36:21.5
AC	Marjorie Kaput	Arizona Wildcats	NT
AC	Kathy Adams	Washington Huskies	NT
AC	Lori Alzner	Oregon Ducks	NT
AC	Elizabeth Shack	Loyola Ramblers	NT
AC	Patti Kaufmann	New Mexico Lobos	NT
AC	Marty McElwee	Wisconsin Badgers	NT
AC	Judy Tillapaugh	Purdue Boilermakers	NT
AC	Beverly Roland	Western Illinois Leathernecks	NT
AC	Cathy Bremser	Wisconsin Badgers	NT
AC	Beth Sheridan	Ohio State Buckeyes	NT
AC	Michelle Aubuchon	Cal State East Bay Pioneers	NT
AC	Mary Witt	Kentucky Wildcats	NT
AC	Deborah Snaggs	Richmond Spiders	NT
AC	Wendy Walker	Cal State Northridge Matadors	NT
AC	Peggy Cleary	Penn State Nittany Lions	NT

100 m hurdles (−1.8 m/s)
Pl.	Name	Team	Mark
1st place, gold medalist(s)	Stephanie Hightower	Ohio State Buckeyes	13.2
2nd place, silver medalist(s)	Deby LaPlante	San Diego State Aztecs	13.2
3rd place, bronze medalist(s)	Cecelia Branch	UNLV Rebels	13.7
4th	Brenda Calhoun	Arizona State Sun Devils	13.7
5th	Jodi Anderson	Cal State Northridge Matadors	13.7
6th	Linda Bourn	BYU Cougars	14.0
7th	Linda Waltman	Texas A&M Aggies	14.0
8th	Debi Kilhoffer	Illinois State Redbirds	14.1
9th	Pamela Page	Missouri Tigers	14.3

400 m hurdles
Pl.	Name	Team	Mark
1st place, gold medalist(s)	Deb Esser	Iowa State Cyclones	56.53
2nd place, silver medalist(s)	Edna Brown	Temple Owls	58.71
3rd place, bronze medalist(s)	Peach Payne	Purdue Boilermakers	59.57
4th	Joan Elumelu	Boston University Terriers	59.88
5th	Michelle Hawthorne	California Golden Bears	1:00.03
6th	Anita Jones	Western Kentucky Lady Toppers	1:00.52
7th	Fiona Macauley	Oklahoma Sooners	1:00.66
8th	Tammy Etienne	Texas Longhorns	1:00.91
9th	Ellis Mahal	Iowa State Cyclones	1:00.96

4 × 110 yards relay
Pl.	Name	Team	Mark
1st place, gold medalist(s)	Kathey Crawford	Arizona State Sun Devils	45.21
1st place, gold medalist(s)	Freida Cobbs	Arizona State Sun Devils	45.21
1st place, gold medalist(s)	Brenda Calhoun	Arizona State Sun Devils	45.21
1st place, gold medalist(s)	Val Boyer	Arizona State Sun Devils	45.21
2nd place, silver medalist(s)	Young	Cal State Northridge Matadors	45.54
2nd place, silver medalist(s)	Sandra Howard	Cal State Northridge Matadors	45.54
2nd place, silver medalist(s)	Valerie Brisco	Cal State Northridge Matadors	45.54
2nd place, silver medalist(s)	Alice Brown	Cal State Northridge Matadors	45.54
3rd place, bronze medalist(s)	Leleith Hodges	Texas Woman's Pioneers	45.83
3rd place, bronze medalist(s)	Stephanie Brown	Texas Woman's Pioneers	45.83
3rd place, bronze medalist(s)	Karen Holmes	Texas Woman's Pioneers	45.83
3rd place, bronze medalist(s)	Ruth Simpson	Texas Woman's Pioneers	45.83
4th	Gail Douglas	USC Trojans	45.97
4th	Kim Robinson	USC Trojans	45.97
4th	Sandra Crabtree	USC Trojans	45.97
4th	Linda Cassidy	USC Trojans	45.97
5th	Jeanine Brown	UTEP Miners	46.23
5th	Esther Otieno	UTEP Miners	46.23
5th	Bea Reese	UTEP Miners	46.23
5th	Carrman Rivers	UTEP Miners	46.23
6th	Michelle Hawthorne	California Golden Bears	46.48
6th	Elaine Parker	California Golden Bears	46.48
6th	Kelia Bolton	California Golden Bears	46.48
6th	Cindy Banks	California Golden Bears	46.48
7th		Auburn Tigers	46.61
8th		Alabama State Lady Hornets	47.42
	Lisa Gourdine	UCLA Bruins	DQ (Note: Dropped baton)
	Judy Reed	UCLA Bruins	DQ

4 × 440 yards relay
Pl.	Name	Team	Mark
1st place, gold medalist(s)	Paula Clagon	Morgan State Lady Bears	3:37.37
1st place, gold medalist(s)	Yvette Coleman	Morgan State Lady Bears	3:37.37
1st place, gold medalist(s)	Roberta Belle	Morgan State Lady Bears	3:37.37
1st place, gold medalist(s)	Paulette Clagon	Morgan State Lady Bears	3:37.37
2nd place, silver medalist(s)	Melanie Batiste	Oregon Ducks	3:41.76
2nd place, silver medalist(s)	Deborah Adams	Oregon Ducks	3:41.76
2nd place, silver medalist(s)	Rhonda Massey	Oregon Ducks	3:41.76
2nd place, silver medalist(s)	Dawna Rose	Oregon Ducks	3:41.76
3rd place, bronze medalist(s)	Grace Kennedy	Temple Owls	3:41.88
3rd place, bronze medalist(s)	Gladys Boone	Temple Owls	3:41.88
3rd place, bronze medalist(s)	Ellen Howard	Temple Owls	3:41.88
3rd place, bronze medalist(s)	Edna Brown	Temple Owls	3:41.88
4th		Texas Longhorns	3:42.32
5th	Mollie Brennan	Michigan State Spartans	3:45.37
5th	Kathy Miller	Michigan State Spartans	3:45.37
5th	Pam Swanigan	Michigan State Spartans	3:45.37
5th	Pam Sedwick	Michigan State Spartans	3:45.37
6th		San Diego State Aztecs	3:46.41
7th		Cal State Northridge Matadors	3:48.70
8th		Penn State Nittany Lions	3:52.95
		Cal State Los Angeles Golden Eagles	DQ (Note: Originally 3:44.79 for 5th)

4 × 880 yards relay
Pl.	Name	Team	Mark
1st place, gold medalist(s)	Kathy Costello	Oregon State Beavers	8:42.9
1st place, gold medalist(s)	Kris Trom	Oregon State Beavers	8:42.9
1st place, gold medalist(s)	Robin Blaine	Oregon State Beavers	8:42.9
1st place, gold medalist(s)	Kathy Weston	Oregon State Beavers	8:42.9
2nd place, silver medalist(s)	Margaret Metcalf	New Mexico Lobos	8:43.52
2nd place, silver medalist(s)	Lynn Brasher	New Mexico Lobos	8:43.52
2nd place, silver medalist(s)	Regina Dramiga	New Mexico Lobos	8:43.52
2nd place, silver medalist(s)	Susan Vigil	New Mexico Lobos	8:43.52
3rd place, bronze medalist(s)	Jennifer Whitfield	Villanova Wildcats	8:43.63
3rd place, bronze medalist(s)	Sue Shea	Villanova Wildcats	8:43.63
3rd place, bronze medalist(s)	Brigid Leddy	Villanova Wildcats	8:43.63
3rd place, bronze medalist(s)	Doriane Lambelet	Villanova Wildcats	8:43.63
4th		Cal State Northridge Matadors	8:44.39
5th	Kathy Chisam	UCLA Bruins	8:46.14
5th	Andrea Ward	UCLA Bruins	8:46.14
5th	Sheila Ralston	UCLA Bruins	8:46.14
5th	Cynthia Warner	UCLA Bruins	8:46.14
6th		Iowa State Cyclones	8:46.31
7th		Penn State Nittany Lions	8:47.48
8th		Western Illinois Leathernecks	9:01.72
9th		Wisconsin Badgers	9:15.1

Sprint medley relay (Note: Held at a total distance of 880 yards, with the first two legs running 110 yards, the third leg running 220 yards, and the anchor leg running 440 yards.)
Pl.	Name	Team	Mark
1st place, gold medalist(s)	Alice Brown	Cal State Northridge Matadors	1:40.12
1st place, gold medalist(s)	Sandra Howard	Cal State Northridge Matadors	1:40.12
1st place, gold medalist(s)	Jodi Anderson	Cal State Northridge Matadors	1:40.12
1st place, gold medalist(s)	Valerie Brisco	Cal State Northridge Matadors	1:40.12
2nd place, silver medalist(s)	Maria Parsons	Morgan State Lady Bears	1:41.16
2nd place, silver medalist(s)	Rhonda Yancey	Morgan State Lady Bears	1:41.16
2nd place, silver medalist(s)	Roberta Belle	Morgan State Lady Bears	1:41.16
2nd place, silver medalist(s)	Paulette Clagon	Morgan State Lady Bears	1:41.16
3rd place, bronze medalist(s)	Kathey Crawford	Arizona State Sun Devils	1:42.05
3rd place, bronze medalist(s)	Brenda Calhoun	Arizona State Sun Devils	1:42.05
3rd place, bronze medalist(s)	Freida Cobbs	Arizona State Sun Devils	1:42.05
3rd place, bronze medalist(s)	Sharon Acker	Arizona State Sun Devils	1:42.05
4th		Missouri Tigers	1:42.52
5th	Maggie Porter	Temple Owls	1:42.56
5th	Grace Kennedy	Temple Owls	1:42.56
5th	Gladys Boone	Temple Owls	1:42.56
5th	Edna Brown	Temple Owls	1:42.56
6th	Mollie Brennan	Michigan State Spartans	1:42.68
6th	Kathy Miller	Michigan State Spartans	1:42.68
6th	Cheryl Gilliam	Michigan State Spartans	1:42.68
6th	Pam Sedwick	Michigan State Spartans	1:42.68
7th		UCLA Bruins	1:43.16
8th		Pittsburgh Panthers	1:43.70
9th		Kansas Jayhawks	1:44.7

High jump
Pl.	Name	Team	Mark
1st place, gold medalist(s)	Louise Ritter	Texas Woman's Pioneers	6 ft 3 1/2 in (1.91 m) NR
2nd place, silver medalist(s)	Pam Spencer	Cal State Northridge Matadors	6 ft 2 1/2 in (1.89 m)
3rd place, bronze medalist(s)	Jalene Chase	Maryland Terrapins	6 ft 0 in (1.82 m)
4th	Maria Betioli	BYU Cougars	6 ft 0 in (1.82 m)
5th	Kimberly Harrell	East Tennessee State Buccaneers	5 ft 11 in (1.8 m)
6th	Carolyn Ford	Lamar Lady Cardinals	5 ft 11 in (1.8 m)
7th	Themis Zambrzycki	BYU Cougars	5 ft 9 3/4 in (1.77 m)
8th	Shawn Corwin	Kansas Jayhawks	5 ft 9 3/4 in (1.77 m)
9th	Sharon Burrill	Nebraska Cornhuskers	5 ft 9 3/4 in (1.77 m)
10th	Fern Simon	Long Beach State Beach	5 ft 9 3/4 in (1.77 m)
11th	Paula Girven	Maryland Terrapins	5 ft 7 3/4 in (1.72 m)
12th	Chris Remmling	UCLA Bruins	5 ft 7 3/4 in (1.72 m)
13th	Lilie Giles	Houston Cougars	5 ft 7 3/4 in (1.72 m)
14th	Annette Tannander	Colorado Buffaloes	NH

Long jump
Pl.	Name	Team	Mark
1st place, gold medalist(s)	Jodi Anderson	Cal State Northridge Matadors	21 ft 0 in (6.4 m) w
2nd place, silver medalist(s)	Pat Johnson	Wisconsin Badgers	20 ft 10 1/2 in (6.36 m) w
3rd place, bronze medalist(s)	Esther Otieno	UTEP Miners	20 ft 8 1/2 in (6.31 m) w
4th	Themis Zambrzycki	BYU Cougars	20 ft 7 1/4 in (6.28 m) w
5th	Sandra Crabtree	USC Trojans	19 ft 11 3/4 in (6.08 m) w
6th	Sherron Walker	Long Beach State Beach	19 ft 11 1/2 in (6.08 m) w
7th	LaNessa Jones	UNLV Rebels	19 ft 10 1/4 in (6.05 m) w
8th	Amy Davis	Houston Cougars	19 ft 9 in (6.01 m) w
9th	Laura Carroll	Temple Owls	18 ft 10 3/4 in (5.75 m)
10th	Lisa Gourdine	UCLA Bruins	18 ft 9 1/4 in (5.72 m) w
11th	Lilie Giles	Houston Cougars	17 ft 11 in (5.46 m) w
12th	Jill Lancaster	Oklahoma Sooners	17 ft 7 in (5.35 m) w

Shot put
Pl.	Name	Team	Mark
1st place, gold medalist(s)	Kathy Devine	Texas Longhorns	52 ft 7 3/4 in (16.04 m)
2nd place, silver medalist(s)	Rosemarie Hauch	Tennessee Volunteers	51 ft 10 in (15.79 m)
3rd place, bronze medalist(s)	Cecil Hansen	Oklahoma Sooners	51 ft 4 1/4 in (15.65 m)
4th	Jill Stenwall	Nebraska–Kearney Lopers	50 ft 9 1/4 in (15.47 m)
5th	Sande Burke	Northeastern Huskies	49 ft 9 in (15.16 m)
6th	Jennifer Smit	UTEP Miners	49 ft 8 in (15.13 m)
7th	Emily Dole	Long Beach State Beach	49 ft 2 1/4 in (14.99 m)
8th	Marcia Mecklenberg	Seattle Pacific Falcons	49 ft 1 in (14.96 m)
9th	Susan Thornton	Tennessee Volunteers	48 ft 7 1/2 in (14.82 m)
10th	Melody Rose	Cal State Los Angeles Golden Eagles	48 ft 7 3/4 in (14.82 m)
11th	Gail Koziara	Dartmouth Big Green	47 ft 8 1/4 in (14.53 m)
12th	Ella Abercrombie	Stephen F. Austin Ladyjacks	45 ft 6 in (13.86 m)

Discus throw
Pl.	Name	Team	Mark
1st place, gold medalist(s)	Ria Van Pedro	Arizona State Sun Devils	184 ft 11 in (56.36 m)
2nd place, silver medalist(s)	Betty Bogers	UTEP Miners	175 ft 10 in (53.59 m)
3rd place, bronze medalist(s)	Julie Hansen	Seattle Pacific Falcons	173 ft 7 in (52.9 m)
4th	Jane Haist	Tennessee Volunteers	169 ft 1 in (51.53 m)
5th	Julie Cart	Arizona State Sun Devils	160 ft 11 in (49.04 m)
6th	Carol Finerud	Texas Longhorns	158 ft 4 in (48.26 m)
7th	Caryl Van Pelt	Washington Huskies	156 ft 6 in (47.7 m)
8th	Brenda Denny	Colorado Buffaloes	156 ft 4 in (47.65 m)
9th	Margaret Fox	Colorado State Rams	152 ft 11 in (46.6 m)
10th	Francine Lynn Kaylor	Colorado State Rams	151 ft 9 in (46.25 m)
11th	Vickilee Cobern	Texas A&M Aggies	149 ft 7 in (45.59 m)
12th	Katherine Picknell	Oregon Ducks	149 ft 7 in (45.59 m)

Javelin throw
Pl.	Name	Team	Mark
1st place, gold medalist(s)	Cathy Sulinski	Cal State East Bay Pioneers	183 ft 3 in (55.85 m)
2nd place, silver medalist(s)	Jeanne Eggert	Washington State Cougars	165 ft 7 in (50.46 m)
3rd place, bronze medalist(s)	Keri Camarigg	Long Beach State Beach	164 ft 3 in (50.06 m)
4th	Celeste Wilkinson	Arizona State Sun Devils	162 ft 11 in (49.65 m)
5th	Tonja Reigle	Oregon State Beavers	162 ft 10 in (49.63 m)
6th	Teresa Cooper	Oregon State Beavers	162 ft 0 in (49.37 m)
7th	Renee Lambrecht	Western Oregon Wolves	158 ft 3 in (48.23 m)
8th	Terry Tepper	Army Black Knights	157 ft 10 in (48.1 m)
9th	Debbie Williams	Michigan Wolverines	157 ft 8 in (48.05 m)
10th	Monica Stultenburg	San Diego State Aztecs	157 ft 8 in (48.05 m)
11th	Debbie Smallwood	Oklahoma State Cowgirls	150 ft 10 in (45.97 m)
12th	Linn Dunton	San Diego State Aztecs	148 ft 10 in (45.36 m)

Pentathlon
Pl.	Name	Team	Mark
1st place, gold medalist(s)	Jodi Anderson	Cal State Northridge Matadors	4475 pts
2nd place, silver medalist(s)	Themis Zambrzycki	BYU Cougars	4422 pts
3rd place, bronze medalist(s)	Linda Waltman	Texas A&M Aggies	4085 pts
4th	Karen Page	Utah State Aggies	4039 pts
5th	Brenda Wilson	Adams State Grizzlies	3977 pts
6th	Mary Anne Harrington	Colorado State Rams	3950 pts
7th	Nancy Malloy	Colorado State Rams	3870 pts
8th	Nora De Araujo	Auburn Tigers	3845 pts
9th	Theresa Smith	Seattle Pacific Falcons	3830 pts
10th	Susan Brownell	Virginia Cavaliers	3826 pts
11th	Terry Seippel	Eastern Kentucky Colonels	3818 pts
12th	Lynn Adams	Illinois State Redbirds	3645 pts
13th	Jenny Stary	Pomona–Pitzer Sagehens	3578 pts
14th	Karen Frazee	Nebraska Cornhuskers	3560 pts
15th	Janelle Smalley	Texas Woman's Pioneers	3545 pts
16th	Patsy Walker	UCLA Bruins	3481 pts
17th	Sandy Lambert	Texas Longhorns	2668 pts

== See also ==
- Association for Intercollegiate Athletics for Women championships § Outdoor track and field
- 1979 AIAW Indoor Track and Field Championships
- 1979 NCAA Division I Outdoor Track and Field Championships
