= NC State Wolfpack track and field =

College track and field team

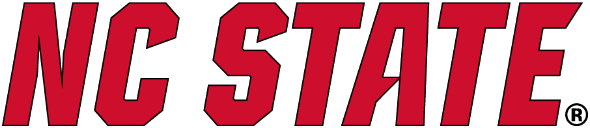
- University: North Carolina State University
- Head coach: Laurie Henes
- Conference: ACC
- Location: Raleigh, North Carolina
- Outdoor track: Dail Soccer Field
- Nickname: Wolfpack
- Colors: Red and white

The NC State Wolfpack track and field team is the track and field program that represents North Carolina State University. The Wolfpack compete in NCAA Division I as a member of the Atlantic Coast Conference. The team is based in Raleigh, North Carolina at the Dail Soccer Field.

The program is coached by Laurie Henes. The track and field program officially encompasses four teams, as the NCAA regards men's and women's indoor track and field and outdoor track and field as separate sports.

Katelyn Tuohy has the most individual NCAA titles of any Wolfpack athlete, with three across the 3000 m and 5000 m from 2022 to 2023. Julie Shea won five AIAW distance titles before women's track and field was added to the NCAA.

== Postseason ==
=== AIAW ===
The Wolfpack have had 4 AIAW All-Americans finishing in the top six at the AIAW indoor or outdoor championships.

AIAW All-Americans
Championships	Name	Event	Place
1978 Outdoor	Julie Shea	3000 meters	5th
1978 Outdoor	Julie Shea	5000 meters	6th
1979 Outdoor	Julie Shea	3000 meters	2nd
1979 Outdoor	Julie Shea	5000 meters	1st
1980 Outdoor	Julie Shea	3000 meters	1st
1980 Outdoor	Mary Shea	3000 meters	6th
1980 Outdoor	Julie Shea	5000 meters	1st
1980 Outdoor	Mary Shea	5000 meters	3rd
1980 Outdoor	Betty Jo Springs	5000 meters	4th
1980 Outdoor	Julie Shea	10,000 meters	1st
1980 Outdoor	Mary Shea	10,000 meters	2nd
1980 Outdoor	Betty Jo Springs	10,000 meters	3rd
1981 Outdoor	Suzanne Girard	3000 meters	3rd
1981 Outdoor	Julie Shea	5000 meters	1st
1981 Outdoor	Mary Shea	5000 meters	2nd
1981 Outdoor	Betty Jo Springs	5000 meters	3rd
1981 Outdoor	Betty Jo Springs	10,000 meters	4th

=== NCAA ===
As of 2024, a total of 38 men and 34 women have achieved individual first-team All-American status at the Division I men's outdoor, women's outdoor, men's indoor, or women's indoor national championships.

First team NCAA All-Americans
Team	Championships	Name	Event	Place	Ref.
Men's	1967 Outdoor	Richard Trichter	4 × 400 meters relay	8th	
Men's	1967 Outdoor	Ron Sicoli	4 × 400 meters relay	8th	
Men's	1967 Outdoor	Jefferson Prather	4 × 400 meters relay	8th	
Men's	1967 Outdoor	Ronald England	4 × 400 meters relay	8th	
Men's	1971 Outdoor	Jim Wilkins	Mile run	7th	
Men's	1972 Outdoor	Jim Wilkins	1500 meters	7th	
Men's	1974 Indoor	Jim Wilkins	3000 meters	5th	
Men's	1976 Indoor	Bob Medlin	Shot put	4th	
Men's	1976 Indoor	LeBaron Caruthers	Shot put	5th	
Men's	1976 Outdoor	Bob Medlin	Shot put	6th	
Men's	1976 Outdoor	LeBaron Caruthers	Shot put	7th	
Men's	1977 Indoor	Bob Medlin	Shot put	2nd	
Men's	1977 Indoor	LeBaron Caruthers	Shot put	5th	
Men's	1977 Outdoor	Bob Medlin	Shot put	6th	
Men's	1977 Outdoor	Joe Hannah	Shot put	8th	
Men's	1980 Outdoor	Mike Murphy	Javelin throw	2nd	
Men's	1981 Indoor	Edwin McIntyre	4 × 400 meters relay	5th	
Men's	1981 Indoor	Pete Beltrez	4 × 400 meters relay	5th	
Men's	1981 Indoor	Auguston Young	4 × 400 meters relay	5th	
Men's	1981 Indoor	Ron Foreman	4 × 400 meters relay	5th	
Men's	1982 Outdoor	Fiedlis Obikwu	Decathlon	7th	
Women's	1982 Outdoor	Suzanne Girard	1500 meters	6th	
Women's	1983 Indoor	Lynne Strause	Mile run	6th	
Men's	1983 Outdoor	Harvey McSwain	100 meters	8th	
Men's	1983 Outdoor	Harvey McSwain	200 meters	6th	
Men's	1983 Outdoor	Auguston Young	4 × 100 meters relay	5th	
Men's	1983 Outdoor	Alston Glenn	4 × 100 meters relay	5th	
Men's	1983 Outdoor	Jake Howard	4 × 100 meters relay	5th	
Men's	1983 Outdoor	Harvey McSwain	4 × 100 meters relay	5th	
Men's	1983 Outdoor	Ladi Oluwole	Triple jump	8th	
Women's	1983 Outdoor	Betty Jo Springs	5000 meters	1st	
Women's	1983 Outdoor	Betty Jo Springs	10,000 meters	1st	
Men's	1984 Indoor	Izell Jenkins	500 meters	2nd	
Women's	1984 Indoor	Chris Arends	High jump	5th	
Women's	1984 Outdoor	Kathy Ormsby	5000 meters	7th	
Men's	1985 Outdoor	Auguston Young	4 × 100 meters relay	1st	
Men's	1985 Outdoor	Alston Glenn	4 × 100 meters relay	1st	
Men's	1985 Outdoor	Danny Peebles	4 × 100 meters relay	1st	
Men's	1985 Outdoor	Harvey McSwain	4 × 100 meters relay	1st	
Men's	1986 Outdoor	Harvey McSwain	200 meters	3rd	
Men's	1986 Outdoor	Danny Peebles	200 meters	4th	
Men's	1986 Outdoor	Darien Bryan	4 × 100 meters relay	6th	
Men's	1986 Outdoor	Harvey McSwain	4 × 100 meters relay	6th	
Men's	1986 Outdoor	Jake Howard	4 × 100 meters relay	6th	
Men's	1986 Outdoor	Danny Peebles	4 × 100 meters relay	6th	
Women's	1986 Outdoor	Janet Smith	5000 meters	7th	
Women's	1986 Outdoor	Connie Jo Robinson	10,000 meters	6th	
Men's	1987 Indoor	Danny Peebles	55 meters	6th	
Men's	1987 Outdoor	Danny Peebles	200 meters	2nd	
Men's	1987 Outdoor	Darian Bryant	4 × 100 meters relay	7th	
Men's	1987 Outdoor	Dwight Frazier	4 × 100 meters relay	7th	
Men's	1987 Outdoor	Gerald Martin	4 × 100 meters relay	7th	
Men's	1987 Outdoor	Danny Peebles	4 × 100 meters relay	7th	
Men's	1987 Outdoor	Mike Patton	Triple jump	6th	
Men's	1988 Outdoor	Danny Peebles	200 meters	4th	
Men's	1988 Outdoor	Gavin Gaynor	3000 meters steeplechase	4th	
Men's	1988 Outdoor	Mike Brooks	4 × 100 meters relay	4th	
Men's	1988 Outdoor	Dwight Frazier	4 × 100 meters relay	4th	
Men's	1988 Outdoor	Kevin Braunskill	4 × 100 meters relay	4th	
Men's	1988 Outdoor	Danny Peebles	4 × 100 meters relay	4th	
Men's	1988 Outdoor	William Turner	Triple jump	5th	
Men's	1988 Outdoor	Tom Huminik	Shot put	4th	
Women's	1988 Outdoor	Janet Smith	10,000 meters	4th	
Men's	1989 Indoor	Kevin Braunskill	200 meters	4th	
Women's	1989 Indoor	Mary Ann Carraher	Mile run	4th	
Women's	1989 Indoor	Janet Smith	5000 meters	6th	
Women's	1989 Indoor	Katrina Price	5000 meters	7th	
Men's	1989 Outdoor	Terry Reese	110 meters hurdles	7th	
Men's	1989 Outdoor	Scott Grell	4 × 100 meters relay	5th	
Men's	1989 Outdoor	Darren Bryant	4 × 100 meters relay	5th	
Men's	1989 Outdoor	Mike Brooks	4 × 100 meters relay	5th	
Men's	1989 Outdoor	Kevin Braunskill	4 × 100 meters relay	5th	
Women's	1989 Outdoor	Mary Ann Carraher	1500 meters	5th	
Women's	1989 Outdoor	Janet Smith	10,000 meters	5th	
Men's	1990 Indoor	Bob Henes	3000 meters	6th	
Women's	1990 Indoor	Laurie Gomez	5000 meters	5th	
Men's	1990 Outdoor	Kevin Braunskill	200 meters	4th	
Men's	1990 Outdoor	Bob Henes	5000 meters	4th	
Women's	1990 Outdoor	Laurie Gomez	5000 meters	2nd	
Men's	1991 Indoor	Kevin Braunskill	200 meters	3rd	
Men's	1991 Indoor	Bob Henes	3000 meters	4th	
Women's	1991 Indoor	Katrina Price	3000 meters	3rd	
Women's	1991 Indoor	Laurie Gomez	5000 meters	3rd	
Men's	1991 Outdoor	Kevin Braunskill	200 meters	4th	
Men's	1991 Outdoor	Bob Henes	5000 meters	5th	
Men's	1991 Outdoor	Thomas Daye	4 × 100 meters relay	6th	
Men's	1991 Outdoor	Scott Grell	4 × 100 meters relay	6th	
Men's	1991 Outdoor	Reggie Lawrence	4 × 100 meters relay	6th	
Men's	1991 Outdoor	Kevin Braunskill	4 × 100 meters relay	6th	
Women's	1991 Outdoor	Laurie Gomez	5000 meters	1st	
Women's	1991 Outdoor	Francine Dumas	5000 meters	8th	
Men's	1992 Indoor	Todd Loperman	3000 meters	6th	
Women's	1992 Indoor	Laurie Gomez	5000 meters	3rd	
Women's	1992 Outdoor	Laurie Gomez	3000 meters	3rd	
Men's	1993 Indoor	Anthony Riley	3000 meters	6th	
Men's	1993 Indoor	Tyrell Taitt	Triple jump	2nd	
Men's	1993 Outdoor	Tyrell Taitt	Triple jump	1st	
Men's	1994 Outdoor	Tyrell Taitt	Triple jump	3rd	
Men's	1995 Outdoor	Omarr Dixon	High jump	3rd	
Women's	1995 Outdoor	Kristen Hall	10,000 meters	6th	
Women's	1996 Indoor	Quicha Floyd	High jump	7th	
Men's	1996 Outdoor	Jose Gonzalez	3000 meters steeplechase	3rd	
Men's	1996 Outdoor	Ivan Wagner	High jump	7th	
Men's	1997 Outdoor	Jason Perry	110 meters hurdles	8th	
Women's	1998 Indoor	Sherlane Armstrong	Triple jump	8th	
Men's	1998 Outdoor	Pat Joyce	10,000 meters	7th	
Men's	2000 Indoor	Chan Pons	3000 meters	4th	
Women's	2000 Indoor	Sherlane Armstrong	Triple jump	7th	
Men's	2000 Outdoor	Chris Dugan	3000 meters steeplechase	8th	
Men's	2001 Outdoor	Chris Dugan	3000 meters steeplechase	7th	
Women's	2001 Outdoor	Katie Sabino	3000 meters steeplechase	8th	
Women's	2002 Indoor	Kristin Price	5000 meters	7th	
Women's	2002 Outdoor	Katie Sabino	3000 meters steeplechase	7th	
Women's	2002 Outdoor	Kristin Price	5000 meters	3rd	
Women's	2002 Outdoor	Kristin Price	10,000 meters	1st	
Men's	2003 Indoor	Jesse Williams	High jump	2nd	
Women's	2003 Indoor	Kristin Price	5000 meters	6th	
Men's	2003 Outdoor	Andy Smith	3000 meters steeplechase	7th	
Women's	2003 Outdoor	Kristin Price	10,000 meters	3rd	
Women's	2004 Indoor	Kristin Price	5000 meters	6th	
Men's	2004 Outdoor	Andy Smith	3000 meters steeplechase	2nd	
Men's	2004 Outdoor	Chad Pearson	10,000 meters	5th	
Men's	2005 Outdoor	Andy Smith	3000 meters steeplechase	3rd	
Women's	2005 Outdoor	Ebony Foster	100 meters hurdles	4th	
Women's	2005 Outdoor	Julia Lucas	5000 meters	8th	
Women's	2006 Indoor	Jemissa Hess	3000 meters	8th	
Women's	2006 Outdoor	Ebony Foster	100 meters hurdles	6th	
Men's	2007 Indoor	Mitchell Pope	Shot put	7th	
Women's	2007 Indoor	Julia Lucas	5000 meters	6th	
Men's	2007 Outdoor	Mitchell Pope	Shot put	2nd	
Women's	2007 Outdoor	Julia Lucas	5000 meters	4th	
Men's	2008 Indoor	Dexter Adams	Long jump	6th	
Men's	2010 Outdoor	Ryan Hill	5000 meters	7th	
Women's	2011 Outdoor	Keynetta Iyevbele	800 meters	7th	
Men's	2012 Indoor	Ryan Hill	3000 meters	5th	
Men's	2012 Outdoor	Ryan Hill	1500 meters	3rd	
Men's	2013 Indoor	Ryan Hill	Mile run	2nd	
Women's	2013 Outdoor	Karimah Shepherd	Long jump	7th	
Women's	2014 Indoor	Nicole Chavis	Weight throw	6th	
Women's	2015 Indoor	Megan Moye	Distance medley relay	6th	
Women's	2015 Indoor	Tiana Patillo	Distance medley relay	6th	
Women's	2015 Indoor	Kenyetta Iyevbele	Distance medley relay	6th	
Women's	2015 Indoor	Samantha George	Distance medley relay	6th	
Women's	2015 Indoor	Nicole Chavis	Weight throw	6th	
Men's	2015 Outdoor	Jonathan Addison	Long jump	4th	
Men's	2016 Indoor	Luis Vargas	3000 meters	7th	
Men's	2016 Indoor	Luis Vargas	5000 meters	5th	
Men's	2016 Indoor	Jonathan Addison	Long jump	2nd	
Women's	2016 Indoor	Megan Mansy	Mile run	7th	
Women's	2016 Indoor	Erika Kemp	5000 meters	5th	
Women's	2016 Indoor	Nicole Chavis	Weight throw	5th	
Men's	2016 Outdoor	Luis Vargas	10,000 meters	7th	
Men's	2016 Outdoor	Nyheim Hines	4 × 100 meters relay	7th	
Men's	2016 Outdoor	Jonathan Addison	4 × 100 meters relay	7th	
Men's	2016 Outdoor	Shannon Patterson	4 × 100 meters relay	7th	
Men's	2016 Outdoor	Quashawn Cunningham	4 × 100 meters relay	7th	
Men's	2016 Outdoor	Jonathan Addison	Long jump	6th	
Women's	2016 Outdoor	Alexis Perry	100 meters hurdles	5th	
Women's	2016 Outdoor	Alexis Perry	Long jump	4th	
Men's	2017 Indoor	Joshua Davis	Weight throw	5th	
Men's	2018 Indoor	Joshua Davis	Weight throw	3rd	
Women's	2018 Indoor	Elly Henes	5000 meters	7th	
Women's	2021 Indoor	Elly Henes	5000 meters	3rd	
Women's	2021 Indoor	Hannah Steelman	5000 meters	8th	
Women's	2021 Indoor	Katelyn Tuohy	Distance medley relay	7th	
Women's	2021 Indoor	Alexis Postell	Distance medley relay	7th	
Women's	2021 Indoor	Anna Vess	Distance medley relay	7th	
Women's	2021 Indoor	Savannah Shaw	Distance medley relay	7th	
Women's	2021 Outdoor	Elly Henes	5000 meters	1st	
Women's	2021 Outdoor	Kelsey Chmiel	10,000 meters	8th	
Women's	2022 Indoor	Katelyn Tuohy	3000 meters	2nd	
Women's	2022 Indoor	Samantha Bush	3000 meters	6th	
Women's	2022 Indoor	Kelsey Chmiel	3000 meters	7th	
Women's	2022 Indoor	Katelyn Tuohy	5000 meters	2nd	
Women's	2022 Indoor	Kelsey Chmiel	5000 meters	5th	
Women's	2022 Outdoor	Katelyn Tuohy	5000 meters	1st	
Women's	2022 Outdoor	Allie Hays	10,000 meters	5th	
Men's	2023 Indoor	Alex Lang	60 meters	6th	
Men's	2023 Indoor	Josh Brockman	60 meters hurdles	5th	
Women's	2023 Indoor	Katelyn Tuohy	3000 meters	1st	
Women's	2023 Indoor	Kelsey Chmiel	3000 meters	7th	
Women's	2023 Indoor	Katelyn Tuohy	5000 meters	1st	
Women's	2023 Indoor	Kelsey Chmiel	5000 meters	4th	
Women's	2023 Indoor	Sydney Seymour	5000 meters	8th	
Women's	2023 Indoor	Savannah Shaw	Distance medley relay	8th	
Women's	2023 Indoor	Caroline Lewis	Distance medley relay	8th	
Women's	2023 Indoor	Grace Hartman	Distance medley relay	8th	
Women's	2023 Indoor	Samantha Bush	Distance medley relay	8th	
Women's	2023 Outdoor	Katelyn Tuohy	1500 meters	7th	
Women's	2023 Outdoor	Amaris Tyynismaa	5000 meters	4th	
Women's	2023 Outdoor	Kelsey Chmiel	10,000 meters	8th	
Women's	2024 Indoor	Grace Hartman	5000 meters	8th	
Women's	2024 Outdoor	Grace Hartman	10,000 meters	8th	
Women's	2025 Indoor	Grace Hartman	3000 meters	5th	
Women's	2025 Indoor	Grace Hartman	5000 meters	6th	
Women's	2025 Indoor	Kate Putman	Distance medley relay	6th	
Women's	2025 Indoor	Jordyn Parker	Distance medley relay	6th	
Women's	2025 Indoor	Angelina Napoleon	Distance medley relay	6th	
Women's	2025 Indoor	Hannah Gapes	Distance medley relay	6th	
Men's	2025 Outdoor	Tyson Adams	Long jump	6th	
Women's	2025 Outdoor	Grace Hartman	5000 meters	5th	
Women's	2025 Outdoor	Grace Hartman	10,000 meters	2nd	
Women's	2025 Outdoor	Angelina Napoleon	3000 meters steeplechase	3rd	

== See also ==
- Category:NC State Wolfpack men's track and field athletes (30)
- Category:NC State Wolfpack women's track and field athletes (14)
