= 1980 AIAW Outdoor Track and Field Championships =

U.S. women's athletics collegiate championship event

- Dates: May 21–24, 1980
- Host city: Eugene, Oregon; University of Oregon
- Venue: Hayward Field
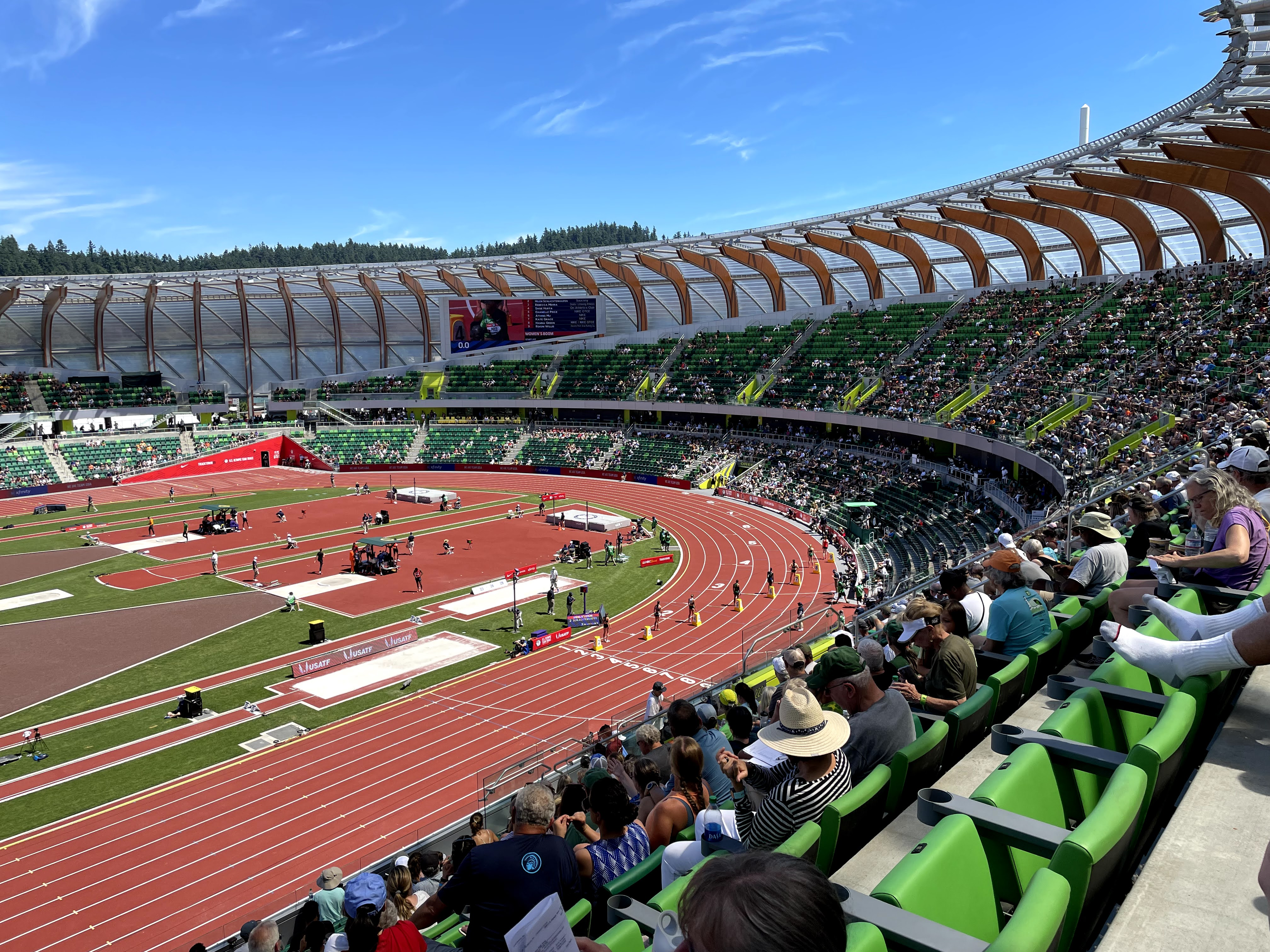

The 1980 AIAW Outdoor Track And Field Championships were the 12th annual Association for Intercollegiate Athletics for Women-sanctioned track meet to determine the individual and team national champions of women's collegiate outdoor track and field events in the United States. They were contested May 21−24, 1980 in Eugene, Oregon by host University of Oregon. There were not separate AIAW Division I, II, and III championships for outdoor track and field until 1981.

The University of Nebraska–Lincoln, California State Los Angeles, and North Carolina State University were all viewed as favorites, but California State University, Northridge won the team title ahead of them unexpectedly. Cal State Northridge was said to have won by relying on their track runners at the expense of field athletes.

== Team standings ==
- Scoring: 10 points for a 1st-place finish, 8 points for 2nd, 6 points for 3rd, 4 points for 4th, 2 points for 5th, and 1 point for 6th. Top 10 teams shown.

Rank	Team	Points
1st place, gold medalist(s)	Cal State Northridge Matadors	59
2nd place, silver medalist(s)	NC State Wolfpack	55
3rd place, bronze medalist(s)	Cal State Los Angeles Golden Eagles	40
4th	Tennessee Volunteers	33
5th	UCLA Bruins	30
6th	Arizona State Sun Devils	29
7th	Nebraska Cornhuskers	28
8th	Arizona Wildcats	24
9th	Wisconsin Badgers	20
10th	Maryland Terrapins	19
10th	Oregon Ducks	19

== Results ==
- Only results of finals are shown

100 m (+1.46 m/s)
Pl.	Name	Team	Mark
1st place, gold medalist(s)	Alice Brown	Cal State Northridge Matadors	11.27
2nd place, silver medalist(s)	Andrea Lynch	Cal State Northridge Matadors	11.32
3rd place, bronze medalist(s)	Merlene Ottey	Nebraska Cornhuskers	11.38
4th	Diane Williams	Michigan State Spartans	11.49
5th	Leleith Hodges	Texas Woman's Pioneers	11.50
6th	Val Boyer	Arizona State Sun Devils	11.56
7th	Benita Fitzgerald	Tennessee Volunteers	11.77
8th	Florence Griffith	Cal State Northridge Matadors	11.81

200 m (+2.64 m/s)
Pl.	Name	Team	Mark
1st place, gold medalist(s)	Merlene Ottey	Nebraska Cornhuskers	22.85 w
2nd place, silver medalist(s)	Alice Brown	Cal State Northridge Matadors	23.23 w
3rd place, bronze medalist(s)	Jackie Pusey	Cal State Los Angeles Golden Eagles	23.52 w
4th	Val Boyer	Arizona State Sun Devils	23.58 w
5th	Cheryl Gilliam	Michigan State Spartans	23.82 w
6th	Debra Pinnix	North Texas Mean Green	23.88 w
7th	Roberta Belle	Morgan State Lady Bears	23.95 w
8th	Yolanda Rich	Cal State Los Angeles Golden Eagles	24.06 w

400 m
Pl.	Name	Team	Mark
1st place, gold medalist(s)	Yolanda Rich	Cal State Los Angeles Golden Eagles	52.7
2nd place, silver medalist(s)	Roberta Belle	Morgan State Lady Bears	53.1
3rd place, bronze medalist(s)	Kim Thomas	St. John's Red Storm	53.5
4th	Jennie Gorham	Nebraska Cornhuskers	53.6
5th	Pam Moore	Wisconsin Badgers	53.7
6th	Grace Bakari	Oregon Ducks	53.9
7th	Sheila Barney	Western Illinois Leathernecks	54.5
8th	Ruth Simpson	Texas Woman's Pioneers	55.6

800 m
Pl.	Name	Team	Mark
1st place, gold medalist(s)	Delisa Walton	Tennessee Volunteers	2:04.88
2nd place, silver medalist(s)	Leann Warren	Oregon Ducks	2:04.91
3rd place, bronze medalist(s)	Lee Ballenger	Colorado Buffaloes	2:05.86
4th	Cynthia Warner	UCLA Bruins	2:06.01
5th	Siri Bjelland	Oklahoma Sooners	2:06.14
6th	Dana Glidden	Missouri Tigers	2:08.42
7th	Minnie McPhatter	East Carolina Pirates	2:09.51
8th	Kathy Tarpo	Purdue Boilermakers	2:10.12

1500 m
Pl.	Name	Team	Mark
1st place, gold medalist(s)	Maggie Keyes	Cal Poly Mustangs	4:15.85
2nd place, silver medalist(s)	Linda Goen	UCLA Bruins	4:16.19
3rd place, bronze medalist(s)	Alice Trumbly	California Golden Bears	4:17.58
4th	Chris Mullen	Georgetown Hoyas	4:18.95
5th	Mary Rawe	Penn State Nittany Lions	4:19.00
6th	Rose Thomson	Wisconsin Badgers	4:19.08
7th	Suzie Houston	Wisconsin Badgers	4:19.35
8th	Ileana Hocking	North Texas Mean Green	4:19.41
9th	Jill Haworth	Virginia Cavaliers	4:25.27
10th	Valorie Horan	Houston Cougars	4:26.4
11th	Margaret Groos	Virginia Cavaliers	4:28.4
12th	Michele Brown	Kansas Jayhawks	4:29.2

3000 m
Pl.	Name	Team	Mark
1st place, gold medalist(s)	Julie Shea	NC State Wolfpack	9:13.15
2nd place, silver medalist(s)	Rose Thomson	Wisconsin Badgers	9:17.37
3rd place, bronze medalist(s)	Heather Carmichael	Penn State Nittany Lions	9:17.97
4th	Joan Hansen	Arizona Wildcats	9:18.96
5th	Lynn Kanuka	San Diego State Aztecs	9:21.16
6th	Mary Shea	NC State Wolfpack	9:24.35
7th	Pia Palladino	Georgetown Hoyas	9:28.05
8th	Debra Pavik	Maryland Terrapins	9:30.92
9th	Lauri Adams	Montana State Bobcats	9:32.12
10th	Kelly Spatz	Michigan State Spartans	9:38.6
11th	Darcy Tomlinson	Western Michigan Broncos	9:51.5
12th	Shannon Cline	Tennessee Volunteers	10:01.3
13th	Carolyn Ihrig	Penn State Nittany Lions	11:12.2
	Ann Mulrooney	Wisconsin Badgers	DNF
	Judy McCrone	UMass Minutewomen	DNF

5000 m
Pl.	Name	Team	Mark
1st place, gold medalist(s)	Julie Shea	NC State Wolfpack	15:41.28
2nd place, silver medalist(s)	Margaret Groos	Virginia Cavaliers	15:51.64
3rd place, bronze medalist(s)	Mary Shea	NC State Wolfpack	15:57.24
4th	Betty Jo Springs	NC State Wolfpack	16:03.84
5th	Eileen Hornberger	West Chester Golden Rams	16:04.87
6th	Judi St. Hilaire	Vermont Catamounts	16:07.96
7th	Rocky Racette	Minnesota Golden Gophers	16:10.56
8th	Donna Gathje	Minnesota State Mavericks	16:12.70
9th	Margaret Cleary	Penn State Nittany Lions	16:15.89
10th	Eryn Forbes	Oregon Ducks	16:34.62
11th	Liz Hjalmarsson	Drake Bulldogs	16:41.8
12th	Ann Mulrooney	Wisconsin Badgers	16:51.3
13th	Lynne Hjelte	California Golden Bears	16:53.8
14th	Ruth Hamilton	Colorado Buffaloes	16:56.7
15th	Leandra Barinaga	Wyoming Cowgirls	16:57.0
16th	Kim Schnurpfeil	Stanford Cardinal	17:57.4

10,000 m
Pl.	Name	Team	Mark
1st place, gold medalist(s)	Julie Shea	NC State Wolfpack	33:02.32
2nd place, silver medalist(s)	Mary Shea	NC State Wolfpack	33:02.98
3rd place, bronze medalist(s)	Betty Jo Springs	NC State Wolfpack	33:03.32
4th	Midde Hamrin	Lamar Lady Cardinals	33:10.11 NR
5th	Ellen Hart	Harvard Crimson	33:46.72
6th	Janice Oehm	California Golden Bears	33:55.59
7th	Beth Sheridan	Ohio State Buckeyes	34:05.60
8th	Michele Aubuchon	Cal State East Bay Pioneers	34:22.8
9th	Aileen O'Connor	Virginia Cavaliers	34:34.2
10th	Sally Zook	Wisconsin Badgers	34:36.0
11th	Pat Reisdorfer	Augustana (South Dakota) Vikings	34:44.4
12th	Jill Molen	Utah Utes	34:45.7
13th	Judy McCreery	Northern Colorado Bears	34:49.1
14th	Brenda Saunders	Missouri Tigers	34:55.1
15th	Bridgette Baker	Minnesota State Mavericks	35:01.2
16th	Martha Stinson	Missouri Tigers	35:17.9
17th	Nancy Seeger	Rutgers Scarlet Knights	35:19.6
18th	Mary Walsh	Maryland Terrapins	35:21.2
19th	Marty McElwee	Wisconsin Badgers	35:51.7
20th	Barbara Sabitus	James Madison Dukes	35:56.6
21st	Irene Griffith	Oregon Ducks	36:02.4
22nd	Deborah Snaggs	Richmond Spiders	36:08.2
23rd	Mary Seip	Iowa State Cyclones	36:31.6

100 m hurdles (+0.64 m/s)
Pl.	Name	Team	Mark
1st place, gold medalist(s)	Stephanie Hightower	Ohio State Buckeyes	13.07
2nd place, silver medalist(s)	Debi LaPlante	San Diego State Aztecs	13.16
3rd place, bronze medalist(s)	Benita Fitzgerald	Tennessee Volunteers	13.18
4th	Sharon Colyear	Boston University Terriers	13.58
5th	Sue Kameli	San Diego State Aztecs	13.75
6th	Debra Deutsch	Rutgers Scarlet Knights	13.90
7th	Linda Bourn	BYU Cougars	14.01
8th	Karen Weschler	Indiana Hoosiers	14.28

400 m hurdles
Pl.	Name	Team	Mark
1st place, gold medalist(s)	Sandra Myers	Cal State Northridge Matadors	56.40 NR
2nd place, silver medalist(s)	Edna Brown	Temple Owls	57.80
3rd place, bronze medalist(s)	Brenda Chambers	Colorado Buffaloes	58.63
4th	Kim Whitehead	Iowa State Cyclones	58.92
5th	Teri Seippel	Eastern Kentucky Colonels	58.97
6th	Vivian Scruggs	Virginia Cavaliers	59.49
7th	Stephanie Vega	Brooklyn Bulldogs	59.72
8th	Maureen Prendergast	LIU Brooklyn Blackbirds	1:00.36

4 × 100 m relay
Pl.	Name	Team	Mark
1st place, gold medalist(s)	Jeanette Bolden	Cal State Northridge Matadors	44.79
1st place, gold medalist(s)	Andrea Lynch	Cal State Northridge Matadors	44.79
1st place, gold medalist(s)	Alice Brown	Cal State Northridge Matadors	44.79
1st place, gold medalist(s)	Florence Griffith	Cal State Northridge Matadors	44.79
2nd place, silver medalist(s)	Yolanda Rich	Cal State Los Angeles Golden Eagles	45.57
2nd place, silver medalist(s)	Jackie Pusey	Cal State Los Angeles Golden Eagles	45.57
2nd place, silver medalist(s)	Jennifer Innis	Cal State Los Angeles Golden Eagles	45.57
2nd place, silver medalist(s)	Adrienne Lair	Cal State Los Angeles Golden Eagles	45.57
3rd place, bronze medalist(s)	Charlotte Reeves	Arizona State Sun Devils	45.91
3rd place, bronze medalist(s)	Kathey Crawford	Arizona State Sun Devils	45.91
3rd place, bronze medalist(s)	Brenda Calhoun	Arizona State Sun Devils	45.91
3rd place, bronze medalist(s)	Val Boyer	Arizona State Sun Devils	45.91
4th	Amy Davis	Houston Cougars	46.42
4th	Bridgett Singleton	Houston Cougars	46.42
4th	Cruz Ibarguen	Houston Cougars	46.42
4th	Vickie Finch	Houston Cougars	46.42
5th	Robbin Coleman	Texas Longhorns	46.64
5th	Rene Rochester	Texas Longhorns	46.64
5th	Julie Holmes	Texas Longhorns	46.64
5th	Donna Sherfield	Texas Longhorns	46.64
6th	Falecia Freeman	Texas Tech Red Raiders	46.79
6th	Cende Mills	Texas Tech Red Raiders	46.79
6th	Pam Montgomery	Texas Tech Red Raiders	46.79
6th	Sharon Moultrie	Texas Tech Red Raiders	46.79
7th	Belinda Little	Alabama Crimson Tide	46.96
7th	Stephanie Amey	Alabama Crimson Tide	46.96
7th	Karen Key	Alabama Crimson Tide	46.96
7th	Sindy Willard	Alabama Crimson Tide	46.96
		Texas Woman's Pioneers	DNS

4 × 440 yards relay
Pl.	Name	Team	Mark
1st place, gold medalist(s)	Melanie Batiste	Oregon Ducks	3:37.44
1st place, gold medalist(s)	Rhonda Massey	Oregon Ducks	3:37.44
1st place, gold medalist(s)	Leann Warren	Oregon Ducks	3:37.44
1st place, gold medalist(s)	Grace Bakari	Oregon Ducks	3:37.44
2nd place, silver medalist(s)	Arlise Emerson	UCLA Bruins	3:37.70
2nd place, silver medalist(s)	Kim Law	UCLA Bruins	3:37.70
2nd place, silver medalist(s)	Cindy Cumbess	UCLA Bruins	3:37.70
2nd place, silver medalist(s)	Oralee Fowler	UCLA Bruins	3:37.70
3rd place, bronze medalist(s)	Carrman Rivers	UTEP Miners	3:38.98
3rd place, bronze medalist(s)	Esther Otieno	UTEP Miners	3:38.98
3rd place, bronze medalist(s)	Truus Van Amstel	UTEP Miners	3:38.98
3rd place, bronze medalist(s)	Jeanine Brown	UTEP Miners	3:38.98
4th	Robbin Coleman	Texas Longhorns	3:39.96
4th	Felecia Anderson	Texas Longhorns	3:39.96
4th	Tammy Etienne	Texas Longhorns	3:39.96
4th	Julie Holmes	Texas Longhorns	3:39.96
5th	Ellen Howard	Temple Owls	3:41.08
5th	Gladys Boone	Temple Owls	3:41.08
5th	Amy Whicker	Temple Owls	3:41.08
5th	Edna Brown	Temple Owls	3:41.08
6th	Kim White	Cal State Northridge Matadors	3:41.50
6th	Missy Jerald	Cal State Northridge Matadors	3:41.50
6th	Letitia Sherrill	Cal State Northridge Matadors	3:41.50
6th	Sandy Myers	Cal State Northridge Matadors	3:41.50
7th	Lisa Sherrill	Tennessee Volunteers	3:42.98
7th	Cathy Kirchner	Tennessee Volunteers	3:42.98
7th	Vata Allen	Tennessee Volunteers	3:42.98
7th	Delisa Walton	Tennessee Volunteers	3:42.98
8th	L'Anna Howard	Arkansas Razorbacks	3:43.60
8th	Linda Bedford	Arkansas Razorbacks	3:43.60
8th	Lisa Sparks	Arkansas Razorbacks	3:43.60
8th	Diann Ousley	Arkansas Razorbacks	3:43.60

4 × 880 yards relay
Pl.	Name	Team	Mark
1st place, gold medalist(s)	Andrea Ward	UCLA Bruins	8:41.64
1st place, gold medalist(s)	Sheila Ralston	UCLA Bruins	8:41.64
1st place, gold medalist(s)	Cynthia Warner	UCLA Bruins	8:41.64
1st place, gold medalist(s)	Linda Goen	UCLA Bruins	8:41.64
2nd place, silver medalist(s)	Maureen Houghton	Oklahoma Sooners	8:41.83
2nd place, silver medalist(s)	Jill Lancaster	Oklahoma Sooners	8:41.83
2nd place, silver medalist(s)	Mavis Curtis	Oklahoma Sooners	8:41.83
2nd place, silver medalist(s)	Siri Bjelland	Oklahoma Sooners	8:41.83
3rd place, bronze medalist(s)	Sandra Gregg	Washington Huskies	8:43.57
3rd place, bronze medalist(s)	Anne Phillips	Washington Huskies	8:43.57
3rd place, bronze medalist(s)	Susan Gregg	Washington Huskies	8:43.57
3rd place, bronze medalist(s)	Dana Arnim	Washington Huskies	8:43.57
4th	Jane Lange	Iowa State Cyclones	8:45.55
4th	Wren Schafer	Iowa State Cyclones	8:45.55
4th	Diane Vetter	Iowa State Cyclones	8:45.55
4th	Debbie Vetter	Iowa State Cyclones	8:45.55
5th	Linda Nicholson	Virginia Cavaliers	8:46.21
5th	Margaret Groos	Virginia Cavaliers	8:46.21
5th	Jill Haworth	Virginia Cavaliers	8:46.21
5th	Vivian Scruggs	Virginia Cavaliers	8:46.21
6th	Suzie Houston	Wisconsin Badgers	8:49.36
6th	Sue Beischel	Wisconsin Badgers	8:49.36
6th	Sue Spaltholz	Wisconsin Badgers	8:49.36
6th	Ellen Brewster	Wisconsin Badgers	8:49.36
7th	Debbie Brizee	Oregon State Beavers	8:54.91
7th	Kris Trom	Oregon State Beavers	8:54.91
7th	Cindy Greiner	Oregon State Beavers	8:54.91
7th	Kathy Weston	Oregon State Beavers	8:54.91
8th	Fran Montes	Colorado Buffaloes	9:00.06
8th	Drake	Colorado Buffaloes	9:00.06
8th	Carleen Thom	Colorado Buffaloes	9:00.06
8th	Lee Ballenger	Colorado Buffaloes	9:00.06

Sprint medley relay (Note: Held at a total distance of 800 m, with the first two legs running 100 m, the third leg running 200 m, and the anchor leg running 400 m.)
Pl.	Name	Team	Mark
1st place, gold medalist(s)	Jennifer Innis	Cal State Los Angeles Golden Eagles	1:38.4
1st place, gold medalist(s)	Adrienne Lair	Cal State Los Angeles Golden Eagles	1:38.4
1st place, gold medalist(s)	Jackie Pusey	Cal State Los Angeles Golden Eagles	1:38.4
1st place, gold medalist(s)	Yolanda Rich	Cal State Los Angeles Golden Eagles	1:38.4
2nd place, silver medalist(s)	Sandy Smith	Tennessee Volunteers	1:38.5
2nd place, silver medalist(s)	Vanessa Robinson	Tennessee Volunteers	1:38.5
2nd place, silver medalist(s)	Benita Fitzgerald	Tennessee Volunteers	1:38.5
2nd place, silver medalist(s)	Delisa Walton	Tennessee Volunteers	1:38.5
3rd place, bronze medalist(s)	Julie Seaton	Nebraska Cornhuskers	1:39.0
3rd place, bronze medalist(s)	Norma Murray	Nebraska Cornhuskers	1:39.0
3rd place, bronze medalist(s)	Merlene Ottey	Nebraska Cornhuskers	1:39.0
3rd place, bronze medalist(s)	Jenny Gorham	Nebraska Cornhuskers	1:39.0
4th	Cheryll Hawthorne	California Golden Bears	1:40.3
4th	Elaine Parker	California Golden Bears	1:40.3
4th	Connie Culbert	California Golden Bears	1:40.3
4th	Marian Franklin	California Golden Bears	1:40.3
5th	Leleith Hodges	Texas Woman's Pioneers	1:40.6
5th	Karen Holmes	Texas Woman's Pioneers	1:40.6
5th	Dorothy Scott	Texas Woman's Pioneers	1:40.6
5th	Ruth Simpson	Texas Woman's Pioneers	1:40.6
6th	Leslie Palmer	Maryland Terrapins	1:41.5
6th	Leola Toomer	Maryland Terrapins	1:41.5
6th	Beverly Roman	Maryland Terrapins	1:41.5
6th	Linda Miller	Maryland Terrapins	1:41.5
7th	Jeanette Bolden	Cal State Northridge Matadors	1:49.4
7th	Andrea Lynch	Cal State Northridge Matadors	1:49.4
7th	Florence Griffith	Cal State Northridge Matadors	1:49.4
7th	Kim White	Cal State Northridge Matadors	1:49.4
		Morgan State Bears	DNS

High jump
Pl.	Name	Team	Mark
1st place, gold medalist(s)	Coleen Reinstra	Arizona State Sun Devils	6 ft 1 1/4 in (1.86 m)
2nd place, silver medalist(s)	Maria Betioli	BYU Cougars	6 ft 0 1/2 in (1.84 m)
3rd place, bronze medalist(s)	Paula Girven	Maryland Terrapins	6 ft 0 1/2 in (1.84 m)
4th	Jalene Chase	Maryland Terrapins	5 ft 11 3/4 in (1.82 m)
5th	Kari Gosswiller	Cal State Northridge Matadors	5 ft 11 3/4 in (1.82 m)
6th	Sharon Burrill	Nebraska Cornhuskers	5 ft 10 1/2 in (1.79 m)
7th	Anne Erpenbeck	Drake Bulldogs	5 ft 9 1/4 in (1.75 m)
8th	Suzanne Blake	Oregon State Beavers	5 ft 9 1/4 in (1.75 m)
9th	Helen Ogar	Missouri Tigers	5 ft 7 1/4 in (1.7 m)
10th	Inge Christenssen	Ohio State Buckeyes	5 ft 7 1/4 in (1.7 m)
10th	Karen Krawiec	Penn State Nittany Lions	5 ft 7 1/4 in (1.7 m)
12th	Sally McCarthy	Oklahoma Sooners	NH

Long jump
Pl.	Name	Team	Mark
1st place, gold medalist(s)	Sandra Myers	Cal State Northridge Matadors	20 ft 7 3/4 in (6.29 m)
2nd place, silver medalist(s)	Pat Johnson	Wisconsin Badgers	20 ft 7 in (6.27 m)
3rd place, bronze medalist(s)	Jennifer Innis	Cal State Los Angeles Golden Eagles	20 ft 3 1/2 in (6.18 m)
4th	Amy Davis	Houston Cougars	20 ft 0 1/2 in (6.1 m)
5th	Pat Miller	Wyoming Cowgirls	19 ft 10 1/4 in (6.05 m)
6th	LaNessa Jones	UNLV Rebels	19 ft 9 1/2 in (6.03 m)
7th	Gwen Loud	UCLA Bruins	19 ft 7 in (5.96 m)
8th	Themis Zambrzycki	BYU Cougars	19 ft 6 in (5.94 m)
9th	Jackie Mays	Angelo State Rams	19 ft 3 1/2 in (5.88 m)
10th	Karen Taylor	Cal State Northridge Matadors	19 ft 2 in (5.84 m)
11th	Becky Jo Kaiser	Illinois Fighting Illini	19 ft 2 in (5.84 m)
12th	Pat Knighton	Rutgers Scarlet Knights	18 ft 1 3/4 in (5.53 m)

Shot put
Pl.	Name	Team	Mark
1st place, gold medalist(s)	Meg Ritchie	Arizona Wildcats	54 ft 2 in (16.51 m)
2nd place, silver medalist(s)	Rose Hauch	Tennessee Volunteers	53 ft 3 in (16.23 m)
3rd place, bronze medalist(s)	Marita Walton	Maryland Terrapins	52 ft 5 1/4 in (15.98 m)
4th	Jennifer Smit	UTEP Miners	49 ft 8 1/2 in (15.15 m)
5th	Sandy Burke	Northeastern Huskies	49 ft 9 3/4 in (15.18 m)
6th	Susan Thornton	Tennessee Volunteers	49 ft 5 1/4 in (15.06 m)
7th	Emily Dole	Long Beach State Beach	48 ft 11 1/4 in (14.91 m)
8th	Neni Davis	St. John's Red Storm	47 ft 10 1/2 in (14.59 m)
9th	Kelly Curran	Colorado State Rams	47 ft 4 1/2 in (14.43 m)
10th	Heidi Kauti	UCLA Bruins	47 ft 0 1/4 in (14.33 m)
11th	Ria Stalman	Arizona State Sun Devils	47 ft 2 1/2 in (14.38 m)
12th	Gail Koziara	Dartmouth Big Green	46 ft 9 3/4 in (14.26 m)

Discus throw
Pl.	Name	Team	Mark
1st place, gold medalist(s)	Meg Ritchie	Arizona Wildcats	211 ft 1 in (64.33 m)
2nd place, silver medalist(s)	Ria Stalman	UTEP Miners	189 ft 1 in (57.63 m)
3rd place, bronze medalist(s)	Betty Bogers	UTEP Miners	169 ft 7 in (51.68 m)
4th	Pia Iacovo	Holy Cross Crusaders	165 ft 0 in (50.29 m)
5th	Marita Walton	Maryland Terrapins	162 ft 5 in (49.5 m)
6th	Diane Pugh	St. John's Red Storm	161 ft 11 in (49.35 m)
7th	Leslie Hoerner	Long Beach State Beach	161 ft 4 in (49.17 m)
8th	Brenda Denny	Colorado Buffaloes	150 ft 2 in (45.77 m)
9th	Robin Small	Kansas Jayhawks	146 ft 1 in (44.52 m)
10th	Ramona Pagel	Long Beach State Beach	145 ft 8 in (44.39 m)
11th	Julie Cart	Arizona State Sun Devils	142 ft 5 in (43.4 m)
12th	Lisha Lass	Oregon Ducks	137 ft 5 in (41.88 m)

Javelin throw
Pl.	Name	Team	Mark
1st place, gold medalist(s)	Jacqueline Nelson	Long Beach State Beach	173 ft 11 in (53 m)
2nd place, silver medalist(s)	Mary Osborne	Stanford Cardinal	166 ft 2 in (50.64 m)
3rd place, bronze medalist(s)	Cathy Sulinski	Chico State Wildcats	164 ft 0 in (49.98 m)
4th	Cathy Calo	Kent State Golden Flashes	161 ft 0 in (49.07 m)
5th	Teresa Cooper	Oregon State Beavers	159 ft 10 in (48.71 m)
6th	Jeanne Eggart	Washington State Cougars	159 ft 8 in (48.66 m)
7th	Deanna Carr	Washington Huskies	159 ft 4 in (48.56 m)
8th	Tonja Reigle	Oregon State Beavers	156 ft 8 in (47.75 m)
9th	Sally Harmon	Oregon Ducks	156 ft 4 in (47.65 m)
10th	Rozlyn Rouse	BYU Cougars	155 ft 4 in (47.34 m)
11th	Patty Kearney	Oregon Ducks	149 ft 10 in (45.66 m)
12th	Susan Gibson	Alabama Crimson Tide	148 ft 3 in (45.18 m)

Pentathlon
Pl.	Name	Team	Mark
1st place, gold medalist(s)	Themis Zambrzycki	BYU Cougars	4180 pts
2nd place, silver medalist(s)	Teri Seippel	Eastern Kentucky Colonels	4304 pts
3rd place, bronze medalist(s)	Ann Crump	UNLV Rebels	3932 pts
4th	Susan Brownell	Virginia Cavaliers	3892 pts
5th	Cynthia Banks	California Golden Bears	3783 pts
6th	Nancy Kindig	Nebraska Cornhuskers	3747 pts
7th	Sande Lambert	Texas A&M Aggies	3746 pts
8th	Nora Araujo	Auburn Tigers	3722 pts
9th	Janet Terp	Vermont Catamounts	3686 pts
10th	Wendy Limbaugh	Utah State Aggies	3668 pts
11th	Margaret Woods	Purdue Boilermakers	3564 pts
12th	Luann Morris	UC Santa Barbara Gauchos	3461 pts
13th	Kerry Zwart	USC Trojans	3428 pts
14th	Jenny Stary	Pomona–Pitzer Sagehens	2899 pts
15th	Peggy Schafer	Montana State Bobcats	2084 pts
16th	Sondra Olbermeier	Nebraska Cornhuskers	2001 pts
17th	Tonya Alston	UCLA Bruins	1441 pts

== See also ==
- Association for Intercollegiate Athletics for Women championships § Outdoor track and field
- 1980 AIAW Indoor Track and Field Championships
- 1980 NCAA Division I Outdoor Track and Field Championships
