= 1978 AIAW Outdoor Track and Field Championships =

U.S. women's athletics collegiate championship event

- Dates: May 25–27, 1978
- Host city: Knoxville, Tennessee; University of Tennessee
- Venue: Tom Black Track at LaPorte Stadium

The 1978 AIAW Outdoor Track And Field Championships were the 10th annual Association for Intercollegiate Athletics for Women-sanctioned track meet to determine the individual and team national champions of women's collegiate outdoor track and field events in the United States. They were contested May 25−27, 1978 in Knoxville, Tennessee by host University of Tennessee. There were not separate AIAW Division I, II, and III championships for outdoor track and field until 1981.

More than 70 schools and 600 athletes participated. The 1978 championships were the first to use metric distances for all events including relays. The meeting was highlighted by a 5000 m world record from Kathy Mills, who won the 3000 m and 5000 m for Penn State University.

== Team standings ==
- Scoring: 10 points for a 1st-place finish, 8 points for 2nd, 6 points for 3rd, 4 points for 4th, 2 points for 5th, and 1 point for 6th. Top 10 teams shown.

Rank	Team	Points
1st place, gold medalist(s)	Cal State Northridge Matadors	58
2nd place, silver medalist(s)	UCLA Bruins	47
3rd place, bronze medalist(s)	Cal State Los Angeles Golden Eagles	43
4th	Arizona State Sun Devils	41
5th	Iowa State Cyclones	39
6th	Penn State Nittany Lions	34
7th	Texas Woman's Pioneers	33
8th	Prairie View A&M Lady Panthers	32
9th	UTEP Miners	28
10th	Cal State East Bay Pioneers	20

== Results ==
- Only results of finals are shown

100 m
Pl.	Name	Team	Mark
1st place, gold medalist(s)	Leleith Hodges	Texas Woman's Pioneers	11.18
2nd place, silver medalist(s)	Evelyn Ashford	UCLA Bruins	11.42
3rd place, bronze medalist(s)	Sheila Calmese	Kansas Jayhawks	11.58
4th	Gail Douglas	USC Trojans	11.75
5th	Debra Carter	Truman Bulldogs	11.76
6th	Brenda Calhoun	Arizona State Sun Devils	11.89
	Andrea Lynch	Long Beach State Beach	DNF
	Rhonda Brady	Arizona State Sun Devils	DNS
	Kathey Crawford	Arizona State Sun Devils	DNS

200 m
Pl.	Name	Team	Mark
1st place, gold medalist(s)	Evelyn Ashford	UCLA Bruins	22.91
2nd place, silver medalist(s)	Rosalyn Bryant	Cal State Los Angeles Golden Eagles	23.33
3rd place, bronze medalist(s)	Liz Young	District of Columbia Firebirds	23.54
4th	Sheila Calmese	Kansas Jayhawks	23.58
5th	Lorna Forde	LIU Brooklyn Blackbirds	23.59
6th	Patricia Jackson	Prairie View A&M Lady Panthers	23.74
7th	Marie Nickson	Cal State East Bay Pioneers	24.33
8th	Cynthia Mills	Cal State Los Angeles Golden Eagles	24.45
	Andrea Lynch	Long Beach State Beach	DNS

400 m
Pl.	Name	Team	Mark
1st place, gold medalist(s)	Rosalyn Bryant	Cal State Los Angeles Golden Eagles	50.93
2nd place, silver medalist(s)	Lorna Forde	LIU Brooklyn Blackbirds	52.07
3rd place, bronze medalist(s)	Patricia Jackson	Prairie View A&M Lady Panthers	52.12
4th	Essie Kelley	Prairie View A&M Lady Panthers	52.52
5th	Kim Thomas	St. John's Red Storm	52.95
6th	Yolanda Rich	Cal State Los Angeles Golden Eagles	53.43
7th	Mary Harvey	Stephen F. Austin Ladyjacks	NT
8th	Paulette Clagon	Morgan State Lady Bears	NT
9th	Avis Mailey	Arizona State Sun Devils	NT

800 m
Pl.	Name	Team	Mark
1st place, gold medalist(s)	Kathy Weston	Cal State Northridge Matadors	2:05.6
2nd place, silver medalist(s)	Lee Ballenger	Colorado Buffaloes	2:06.0
3rd place, bronze medalist(s)	Deb Vetter	Iowa State Cyclones	2:06.5
4th	Susan Vigil	New Mexico Lobos	2:07.9
5th	Marcia Romesser	Cal State Northridge Matadors	2:08.7
6th	Cindy Ashby	New Mexico Lobos	2:08.9
7th	Kathy Costello	Cal State Northridge Matadors	NT
8th	Rosemarie Giampalmo	Florida State Seminoles	NT
9th	Penny Fales	Penn State Nittany Lions	NT

1500 m
Pl.	Name	Team	Mark
1st place, gold medalist(s)	Deb Vetter	Iowa State Cyclones	4:16.1
2nd place, silver medalist(s)	Debbie Pearson Mitchell	UTEP Miners	4:17.3
3rd place, bronze medalist(s)	Doreen Ennis	Montclair State Red Hawks	4:20.0
4th	Margaret Groos	Virginia Cavaliers	4:22.6
5th	Suzie Houston	Wisconsin Badgers	4:23.5
6th	Brenda Webb	Tennessee Volunteers	4:25.5
7th	Diane Vetter	Iowa State Cyclones	NT
8th	Kate Keyes	UCLA Bruins	NT
9th	Kathy Byrnes	Penn State Nittany Lions	NT
10th	Joyce Urish	Kansas State Wildcats	NT
11th	Cindy Dixon	Nebraska Cornhuskers	NT

3000 m (Note: Places 11 through 19 not listed)
Pl.	Name	Team	Mark
1st place, gold medalist(s)	Kathy Mills	Penn State Nittany Lions	9:08.1
2nd place, silver medalist(s)	Kris Bankes	Penn State Nittany Lions	9:19.0
3rd place, bronze medalist(s)	Ellison Goodall	Duke Blue Devils	9:19.3
4th	Sue Kinsey	Cal State Northridge Matadors	9:19.4
5th	Julie Shea	NC State Wolfpack	9:29.3
6th	Susan Schaefer	Eastern Kentucky Colonels	9:31.5
7th	Debbie Quatier	Seattle Pacific Falcons	9:33.3
8th	Cathie Twomey	Minnesota Golden Gophers	9:40.1
9th	Carrie Craven	Cal Poly Humboldt Lumberjacks	9:46.0
10th	Katy Mountain	Oregon Ducks	9:46.8
20th	Lynn Lashley	Tennessee Volunteers	10:30.2

5000 m
Pl.	Name	Team	Mark
1st place, gold medalist(s)	Kathy Mills	Penn State Nittany Lions	15:35.5 WR
2nd place, silver medalist(s)	Julie Brown	Cal State Northridge Matadors	15:59.9
3rd place, bronze medalist(s)	Sue Kinsey	Cal State Northridge Matadors	16:00.4
4th	Ellison Goodall	Duke Blue Devils	16:02.2
5th	Susan Schaefer	Eastern Kentucky Colonels	16:05.9
6th	Julie Shea	NC State Wolfpack	16:10.3
7th	Kris Bankes	Penn State Nittany Lions	16:12.0
8th	Brenda Webb	Tennessee Volunteers	NT
9th	Debbie Quatier	Seattle Pacific Falcons	NT
10th	Valerie Ford	NC State Wolfpack	NT

100 m hurdles
Pl.	Name	Team	Mark
1st place, gold medalist(s)	Patty Van Wolvelaere	USC Trojans	13.14 NR
2nd place, silver medalist(s)	Modupe Oshikoya	UCLA Bruins	13.49
3rd place, bronze medalist(s)	Stephanie Hightower	Ohio State Buckeyes	13.50
4th	Brenda Calhoun	Arizona State Sun Devils	13.50
5th	Rhonda Brady	Arizona State Sun Devils	13.80
6th	Mitzi McMillin	USC Trojans	13.95

400 m hurdles
Pl.	Name	Team	Mark
1st place, gold medalist(s)	Debbie Esser	Iowa State Cyclones	57.85
2nd place, silver medalist(s)	Denise Waddy	Arizona State Sun Devils	58.62
3rd place, bronze medalist(s)	Collette Winlock	Cal State East Bay Pioneers	58.70
4th	Sandra Souza	Texas Woman's Pioneers	58.81
5th	Debra Melrose	Prairie View A&M Lady Panthers	59.58
6th	Ellie Mahal	Iowa State Cyclones	59.70
7th	Carolyn Brinkley	District of Columbia Firebirds	1:00.28
8th	Betty Spencer	Alcorn State Lady Braves	NT
9th	Mary Shirk	Southern Illinois Salukis	NT

4 × 100 m relay
Pl.	Name	Team	Mark
1st place, gold medalist(s)	Kathey Crawford	Arizona State Sun Devils	45.40
1st place, gold medalist(s)	Brenda Calhoun	Arizona State Sun Devils	45.40
1st place, gold medalist(s)	Denise Waddy	Arizona State Sun Devils	45.40
1st place, gold medalist(s)	Val Boyer	Arizona State Sun Devils	45.40
2nd place, silver medalist(s)		Texas Woman's Pioneers	45.41
3rd place, bronze medalist(s)		Cal State Los Angeles Golden Eagles	45.60
4th		Cal State Northridge Matadors	45.72
5th	Gail Douglas	USC Trojans	45.78
5th	Patty Van Wolvelaere	USC Trojans	45.78
5th	Mitzi McMillin	USC Trojans	45.78
5th	Rosetta Birt	USC Trojans	45.78
6th		Prairie View A&M Lady Panthers	45.79
7th		Kansas Jayhawks	46.13
8th		Tennessee Volunteers	46.78
9th	Gina Hendy	UCLA Bruins	56.79
9th	Patsy Walker	UCLA Bruins	56.79
9th	Lsa Gourdine	UCLA Bruins	56.79
9th	Evelyn Ashford	UCLA Bruins	56.79

4 × 400 m relay
Pl.	Name	Team	Mark
1st place, gold medalist(s)	Debra Melrose	Prairie View A&M Lady Panthers	3:34.9
1st place, gold medalist(s)	Essie Kelley	Prairie View A&M Lady Panthers	3:34.9
1st place, gold medalist(s)	Angela Dudly	Prairie View A&M Lady Panthers	3:34.9
1st place, gold medalist(s)	Patricia Jackson	Prairie View A&M Lady Panthers	3:34.9
2nd place, silver medalist(s)		Cal State Los Angeles Golden Eagles	3:38.5
3rd place, bronze medalist(s)		Cal State Northridge Matadors	3:39.1
4th		Iowa State Cyclones	3:39.6
5th		Morgan State Lady Bears	3:40.0
6th		Adelphi Panthers	3:40.4
6th	June Griffith	Adelphi Panthers	3:40.4
7th	Patsy Walker	UCLA Bruins	3:40.5
7th	Gina Hendy	UCLA Bruins	3:40.5
7th	Lisa Gourdine	UCLA Bruins	3:40.5
7th	Debbie Roberson	UCLA Bruins	3:40.5
8th		Penn State Nittany Lions	3:41.2
9th		Nebraska Cornhuskers	3:42.5

4 × 800 m relay
Pl.	Name	Team	Mark
1st place, gold medalist(s)	Marcia Romesser	Cal State Northridge Matadors	
1st place, gold medalist(s)	Roma Antoniewicz	Cal State Northridge Matadors	
1st place, gold medalist(s)	Kathy Costello	Cal State Northridge Matadors	
1st place, gold medalist(s)	Kathy Weston	Cal State Northridge Matadors	
2nd place, silver medalist(s)		Iowa State Cyclones	8:35.4
2nd place, silver medalist(s)	Deb Vetter	Iowa State Cyclones	8:35.4
3rd place, bronze medalist(s)	Kathy Byrnes	Penn State Nittany Lions	8:41.1
3rd place, bronze medalist(s)	Sandy Miller	Penn State Nittany Lions	8:41.1
3rd place, bronze medalist(s)	Penny Fales	Penn State Nittany Lions	8:41.1
3rd place, bronze medalist(s)	Lea Ventura	Penn State Nittany Lions	8:41.1
4th		UCLA Bruins	8:46.2
5th	Marty Billingsley	Wisconsin Badgers	8:46.5
5th	Suzie Houston	Wisconsin Badgers	8:46.5
5th	Sue Tallard	Wisconsin Badgers	8:46.5
5th	Ellen Brewster	Wisconsin Badgers	8:46.5
6th		Tennessee Volunteers	8:49.9

Sprint medley relay (Note: Held at a total distance of 800 m, with the first leg running 200 m, the middle two legs running 100 m each, and the anchor leg running 400 m.)
Pl.	Name	Team	Mark
1st place, gold medalist(s)	Valerie Milan	Cal State Los Angeles Golden Eagles	1:37.8
1st place, gold medalist(s)	Yolanda Rich	Cal State Los Angeles Golden Eagles	1:37.8
1st place, gold medalist(s)	Cynthia Mills	Cal State Los Angeles Golden Eagles	1:37.8
1st place, gold medalist(s)	Rosalyn Bryant	Cal State Los Angeles Golden Eagles	1:37.8
2nd place, silver medalist(s)		Prairie View A&M Lady Panthers	1:37.8
3rd place, bronze medalist(s)	Evelyn Ashford	UCLA Bruins	1:39.7
3rd place, bronze medalist(s)	Debbie Roberson	UCLA Bruins	1:39.7
4th		Cal State East Bay Pioneers	1:40.9
5th	Kathey Crawford	Arizona State Sun Devils	1:41.1
5th	Rhonda Brady	Arizona State Sun Devils	1:41.1
5th	Debra Carson	Arizona State Sun Devils	1:41.1
5th	Denise Waddy	Arizona State Sun Devils	1:41.1
6th		Texas Woman's Pioneers	1:43.2

High jump
Pl.	Name	Team	Mark
1st place, gold medalist(s)	Louise Ritter	Texas Woman's Pioneers	6 ft 1 3/4 in (1.87 m)
2nd place, silver medalist(s)	Paula Girven	Maryland Terrapins	6 ft 1 3/4 in (1.87 m)
3rd place, bronze medalist(s)	Pam Spencer	Seattle Pacific Falcons	6 ft 0 1/2 in (1.84 m)
4th	Maggie Garrison	Washington Huskies	6 ft 0 1/2 in (1.84 m)
5th	Beverly Washington	Illinois Fighting Illini	5 ft 10 in (1.77 m)
6th	Marilyn Dubbs	Nebraska–Kearney Lopers	5 ft 10 in (1.77 m)
7th	Joane MacLeod	Tennessee Volunteers	5 ft 10 in (1.77 m)
8th	Theresa Kaliszewski	Ohio State Buckeyes	5 ft 9 in (1.75 m)
9th	Bridgette Bittner	Tennessee Volunteers	5 ft 9 in (1.75 m)
10th	Fern Simon	Long Beach State Beach	5 ft 7 in (1.7 m)
11th	Sharon Carroll	UIC Flames	5 ft 7 in (1.7 m)
	Joni Huntley	Long Beach State Beach	DNS

Long jump
Pl.	Name	Team	Mark
1st place, gold medalist(s)	Modupe Oshikoya	UCLA Bruins	21 ft 6 1/2 in (6.56 m)
2nd place, silver medalist(s)	June Griffith	Adelphi Panthers	21 ft 2 3/4 in (6.47 m)
3rd place, bronze medalist(s)	Jodi Anderson	Cal State Northridge Matadors	21 ft 2 in (6.45 m)
4th	Lorraine Ray	Florida Gators	19 ft 10 1/4 in (6.05 m)
5th	Sherron Walker	Long Beach State Beach	19 ft 8 3/4 in (6.01 m)
6th	Shonel Ferguson	Florida Gators	19 ft 7 3/4 in (5.98 m)
7th	Debra Carson	Arizona State Sun Devils	19 ft 5 in (5.91 m)
8th	Celeste Johnson	Iowa State Cyclones	19 ft 3 1/4 in (5.87 m)
9th	Mitzi McMillin	USC Trojans	19 ft 2 1/4 in (5.84 m)

Shot put
Pl.	Name	Team	Mark
1st place, gold medalist(s)	Jennifer Smit	UTEP Miners	51 ft 9 3/4 in (15.79 m)
2nd place, silver medalist(s)	Kathy Devine	Emporia State Hornets	51 ft 4 3/4 in (15.66 m)
3rd place, bronze medalist(s)	Caryl Van Pelt	Washington Huskies	49 ft 1 1/2 in (14.97 m)
4th	Emily Dole	Long Beach State Beach	49 ft 0 1/2 in (14.94 m)
5th	Lorna Griffin	Seattle Pacific Falcons	48 ft 11 3/4 in (14.92 m)
6th	Jill Stenwall	Nebraska–Kearney Lopers	47 ft 4 1/2 in (14.43 m)
7th	Deanna Patrick	Morehead State Eagles	47 ft 2 1/4 in (14.38 m)
8th	Cecil Hansen	Oklahoma Sooners	46 ft 1 1/2 in (14.05 m)
9th	Ria Stalman	UTEP Miners	45 ft 2 1/2 in (13.77 m)

Discus throw
Pl.	Name	Team	Mark
1st place, gold medalist(s)	Ria Stalman	UTEP Miners	179 ft 9 in (54.78 m)
2nd place, silver medalist(s)	Jane Haist	Tennessee Volunteers	176 ft 3 in (53.72 m)
3rd place, bronze medalist(s)	Lorna Griffin	Seattle Pacific Falcons	163 ft 4 in (49.78 m)
4th	Julie Hansen	Seattle Pacific Falcons	153 ft 8 in (46.83 m)
5th	Jackie Gordon	Florida Gators	152 ft 8 in (46.53 m)
6th	Karen Marshall	Cal State Northridge Matadors	150 ft 8 in (45.92 m)
7th	Betty Bogers	UTEP Miners	148 ft 7 in (45.28 m)
8th	Marcia Mecklenburg	Seattle Pacific Falcons	146 ft 1 in (44.52 m)
9th	Sara La Borde	Wisconsin–Stevens Point Pointers	146 ft 1 in (44.52 m)
10th	Lucy Nieman	Texas Woman's Pioneers	138 ft 1 in (42.08 m)

Javelin throw
Pl.	Name	Team	Mark
1st place, gold medalist(s)	Kathy Sulinski	Cal State East Bay Pioneers	173 ft 1 in (52.75 m)
2nd place, silver medalist(s)	Celeste Wilkinson	Arizona State Sun Devils	170 ft 0 in (51.81 m)
3rd place, bronze medalist(s)	Donna O'Carroll	Rutgers Scarlet Knights	157 ft 0 in (47.85 m)
4th	Kari Camarigg	Long Beach State Beach	153 ft 6 in (46.78 m)
5th	Jeanne Eggart	Washington State Cougars	146 ft 0 in (44.5 m)
6th	Nancy Townsend	Florida State Seminoles	145 ft 8 in (44.39 m)
7th	Donna Branch	Texas A&M Aggies	142 ft 1 in (43.3 m)
8th	Carmen Scherich	Pitt Panthers	141 ft 5 in (43.1 m)
9th	Renne Lambrecht	Western Oregon Wolves	140 ft 2 in (42.72 m)
10th	Sue Visconage	Southern Illinois Salukis	135 ft 9 in (41.37 m)
11th	Lisa Van Benthem	USC Trojans	133 ft 10 in (40.79 m)
12th	Ross	Cal Poly Pomona Broncos	127 ft 6 in (38.86 m)

Pentathlon
Pl.	Name	Team	Mark
1st place, gold medalist(s)	Themis Zambrzycki	BYU Cougars	4279 pts
2nd place, silver medalist(s)	Linda Cornelius	Texas A&M Aggies	4052 pts
3rd place, bronze medalist(s)	Dana Collins	Arizona State Sun Devils	4008 pts
4th	Heidi Hertz	Tennessee Volunteers	3885 pts
5th	Joan Russell	UC Santa Barbara Gauchos	3872 pts
6th	Nancy Kindig	Nebraska Cornhuskers	3866 pts
7th	Teri Seippel	Eastern Kentucky Colonels	3864 pts

== See also ==
- Association for Intercollegiate Athletics for Women championships § Outdoor track and field
- 1978 AIAW Indoor Track and Field Championships
- 1978 NCAA Division I Outdoor Track and Field Championships
