= Maryland Terrapins track and field =

College track and field team

- University: University of Maryland, College Park
- Head coach: Andrew Valmon
- Conference: Big Ten
- Location: College Park, Maryland
- Outdoor track: Ludwig Field
- Nickname: Terrapins
- Colors: Red, white, gold, and black

The Maryland Terrapins track and field team is the track and field program that represents University of Maryland, College Park. The Terrapins compete in NCAA Division I as a member of the Big Ten Conference. The team is based in College Park, Maryland at the Ludwig Field.

The program is coached by Andrew Valmon. The track and field program officially encompasses four teams because the NCAA considers men's and women's indoor track and field and outdoor track and field as separate sports.

Renaldo Nehemiah has won the most NCAA titles of any Terrapin athlete, with three in the hurdles.

== Postseason ==
=== AIAW ===
The Terrapins have had 13 AIAW All-Americans finishing in the top six at the AIAW indoor or outdoor championships.

AIAW All-Americans
Championships	Name	Event	Place
1977 Outdoor	Carolyn McRoy	100 meters	5th
1977 Outdoor	Carolyn McRoy	200 meters	5th
1977 Outdoor	Paula Girven	High jump	5th
1978 Indoor	Melissa Hill	4 × 440 yards relay	1st
1978 Indoor	Marshell Davis	4 × 440 yards relay	1st
1978 Indoor	Debbie Jackson	4 × 440 yards relay	1st
1978 Indoor	Linda Miller	4 × 440 yards relay	1st
1978 Indoor	Jalene Chase	High jump	1st
1978 Outdoor	Paula Girven	High jump	2nd
1979 Outdoor	Jalene Chase	High jump	3rd
1980 Indoor	Beverly Roman	4 × 220 yards relay	5th
1980 Indoor	Leslie Palmer	4 × 220 yards relay	5th
1980 Indoor	Linda Miller	4 × 220 yards relay	5th
1980 Indoor	Leola Toomer	4 × 220 yards relay	5th
1980 Indoor	Paula Girven	High jump	1st
1980 Indoor	Jalene Chase	High jump	4th
1980 Indoor	Marita Walton	Shot put	4th
1980 Outdoor	Leslie Palmer	Sprint medley relay	6th
1980 Outdoor	Leola Toomer	Sprint medley relay	6th
1980 Outdoor	Beverly Roman	Sprint medley relay	6th
1980 Outdoor	Linda Miller	Sprint medley relay	6th
1980 Outdoor	Paula Girven	High jump	3rd
1980 Outdoor	Jalene Chase	High jump	4th
1980 Outdoor	Marita Walton	Shot put	3rd
1980 Outdoor	Marita Walton	Discus throw	5th
1981 Indoor	Debra Tavik	3000 meters	6th
1981 Indoor	Marita Walton	Shot put	2nd
1981 Indoor	Juanita Alson	Pentathlon	3rd
1982 Indoor	Marita Walton	Shot put	2nd
1982 Indoor	Juanita Alson	Pentathlon	4th

=== NCAA ===
As of 2024, a total of 50 men and 14 women have achieved individual first-team All-American status at the Division I men's outdoor, women's outdoor, men's indoor, or women's indoor national championships (using the modern criteria of top-8 placing regardless of athlete nationality).

First team NCAA All-Americans
Team	Championships	Name	Event	Place	Ref.
Men's	1923 Outdoor	Wilson Beers	Shot put	2nd	
Men's	1937 Outdoor	John Guckeyson	Javelin throw	4th	
Men's	1940 Outdoor	Jim Kehoe	800 meters	4th	
Men's	1940 Outdoor	Mason Chronister	Mile run	4th	
Men's	1955 Outdoor	Burr Grimm	Mile run	6th	
Men's	1956 Outdoor	Burr Grimm	1500 meters	8th	
Men's	1957 Outdoor	Burr Grimm	Mile run	3rd	
Men's	1959 Outdoor	Bill Johnson	110 meters hurdles	5th	
Men's	1959 Outdoor	Tom Tait	High jump	6th	
Men's	1959 Outdoor	Bjørn Andersen	Pole vault	6th	
Men's	1959 Outdoor	Nick Kovalakides	Javelin throw	5th	
Men's	1960 Outdoor	Bill Johnson	110 meters hurdles	7th	
Men's	1962 Outdoor	Chris Stuaffer	400 meters hurdles	2nd	
Men's	1962 Outdoor	John Belitza	Pole vault	1st	
Men's	1963 Outdoor	Chris Stuaffer	400 meters hurdles	5th	
Men's	1965 Indoor	Frank Costello	High jump	1st	
Men's	1965 Indoor	Mike Cole	Long jump	1st	
Men's	1965 Outdoor	Frank Costello	High jump	1st	
Men's	1965 Outdoor	Bob Williams	Pole vault	6th	
Men's	1965 Outdoor	Mike Cole	Long jump	5th	
Men's	1966 Indoor	Frank Costello	High jump	2nd	
Men's	1966 Indoor	Ed Marks	Long jump	4th	
Men's	1966 Indoor	Ernie Hearon	Shot put	5th	
Men's	1966 Outdoor	Jim Lee	100 meters	8th	
Men's	1966 Outdoor	Jim Lee	200 meters	3rd	
Men's	1966 Outdoor	Frank Costello	High jump	2nd	
Men's	1967 Outdoor	Jim Lee	100 meters	7th	
Men's	1967 Outdoor	Jack Brickley	4 × 100 meters relay	6th	
Men's	1967 Outdoor	Elmore Hunter	4 × 100 meters relay	6th	
Men's	1967 Outdoor	Jim Lee	4 × 100 meters relay	6th	
Men's	1967 Outdoor	Mike Lockhard	4 × 100 meters relay	6th	
Men's	1967 Outdoor	Elmore Hunter	4 × 400 meters relay	7th	
Men's	1967 Outdoor	Don Donahue	4 × 400 meters relay	7th	
Men's	1967 Outdoor	George Wojtech	4 × 400 meters relay	7th	
Men's	1967 Outdoor	Jack Bickley	4 × 400 meters relay	7th	
Men's	1967 Outdoor	Russ White	Javelin throw	8th	
Men's	1968 Outdoor	John Baker	1500 meters	8th	
Men's	1968 Outdoor	Frank Costello	High jump	5th	
Men's	1968 Outdoor	Ed Marks	Triple jump	6th	
Men's	1969 Indoor	John Baker	Mile run	3rd	
Men's	1969 Indoor	Jack Hanley	Shot put	5th	
Men's	1969 Outdoor	Buddy Williamson	Pole vault	3rd	
Men's	1969 Outdoor	Jack Hanley	Shot put	8th	
Men's	1969 Outdoor	Dick Drescher	Discus throw	3rd	
Men's	1969 Outdoor	Dave Reiss	Javelin throw	3rd	
Men's	1969 Outdoor	Jack Bacon	Javelin throw	8th	
Men's	1970 Indoor	Marshall Bush	55 meters hurdles	4th	
Men's	1970 Indoor	Jim Williamson	Pole vault	1st	
Men's	1970 Outdoor	Joe David	High jump	7th	
Men's	1970 Outdoor	Dave Reiss	Javelin throw	7th	
Men's	1971 Indoor	Joe David	High jump	5th	
Men's	1971 Indoor	Vince Struble	Pole vault	3rd	
Men's	1971 Outdoor	Jack Bacon	Javelin throw	3rd	
Men's	1972 Outdoor	Vince Struble	Pole vault	6th	
Men's	1975 Indoor	Jeff Nichols	4 × 400 meters relay	3rd	
Men's	1975 Indoor	Gerald Johnson	4 × 400 meters relay	3rd	
Men's	1975 Indoor	Bill Ohlmacher	4 × 400 meters relay	3rd	
Men's	1975 Indoor	John O'Keefe	4 × 400 meters relay	3rd	
Men's	1975 Indoor	John Davenport	Long jump	4th	
Men's	1975 Outdoor	Al Hamlin	Decathlon	4th	
Men's	1976 Outdoor	Al Hamlin	Decathlon	2nd	
Men's	1977 Indoor	Ian Pyka	Shot put	3rd	
Men's	1977 Outdoor	Greg Robertson	110 meters hurdles	4th	
Men's	1977 Outdoor	Jim Kirby	Javelin throw	6th	
Men's	1978 Indoor	Renaldo Nehemiah	55 meters hurdles	1st	
Men's	1978 Indoor	Greg Robertson	55 meters hurdles	3rd	
Men's	1978 Indoor	Bob Calhoun	Long jump	4th	
Men's	1978 Outdoor	Renaldo Nehemiah	110 meters hurdles	2nd	
Men's	1978 Outdoor	Bob Calhoun	4 × 100 meters relay	5th	
Men's	1978 Outdoor	Greg Robertson	4 × 100 meters relay	5th	
Men's	1978 Outdoor	Andre Lancaster	4 × 100 meters relay	5th	
Men's	1978 Outdoor	Renaldo Nehemiah	4 × 100 meters relay	5th	
Men's	1978 Outdoor	Brian Melly	High jump	2nd	
Men's	1978 Outdoor	Bob Calhoun	Long jump	3rd	
Men's	1978 Outdoor	Ian Pyka	Shot put	6th	
Men's	1979 Indoor	Renaldo Nehemiah	55 meters hurdles	1st	
Men's	1979 Indoor	Greg Robertson	55 meters hurdles	5th	
Men's	1979 Indoor	Darryl Bryant	4 × 400 meters relay	4th	
Men's	1979 Indoor	Mike Peninston	4 × 400 meters relay	4th	
Men's	1979 Indoor	Andre Lancaster	4 × 400 meters relay	4th	
Men's	1979 Indoor	Chris Person	4 × 400 meters relay	4th	
Men's	1979 Indoor	Bob Calhoun	Long jump	4th	
Men's	1979 Indoor	Dennis Ivory	Triple jump	5th	
Men's	1979 Outdoor	Renaldo Nehemiah	110 meters hurdles	1st	
Men's	1979 Outdoor	Dennis Ivory	Triple jump	2nd	
Men's	1979 Outdoor	Ian Pyka	Shot put	4th	
Men's	1980 Indoor	Chris Person	600 yards	6th	
Men's	1980 Indoor	Darryl Bryant	4 × 400 meters relay	2nd	
Men's	1980 Indoor	Jim Green	4 × 400 meters relay	2nd	
Men's	1980 Indoor	David Saunders	4 × 400 meters relay	2nd	
Men's	1980 Indoor	Chris Person	4 × 400 meters relay	2nd	
Men's	1980 Indoor	Eugene McCarthy	Pole vault	5th	
Men's	1980 Outdoor	Chris Person	400 meters hurdles	8th	
Men's	1981 Indoor	Chris Person	600 yards	6th	
Men's	1981 Indoor	William Theirfelder	High jump	6th	
Men's	1981 Indoor	Alan Baginski	Weight throw	5th	
Men's	1981 Outdoor	Bill Therifelder	High jump	7th	
Men's	1982 Outdoor	Per Kristoffersen	1500 meters	4th	
Women's	1982 Outdoor	Marita Walton	Shot put	4th	
Women's	1982 Outdoor	Marita Walton	Discus throw	6th	
Men's	1983 Outdoor	Al Baginski	Discus throw	8th	
Women's	1983 Outdoor	Marita Walton	Shot put	4th	
Men's	1984 Indoor	Per Kristofferson	3000 meters	5th	
Women's	1984 Indoor	Bobbie McGee	800 meters	3rd	
Women's	1984 Indoor	Marita Walton	Shot put	3rd	
Women's	1984 Outdoor	Linda Spenst	Heptathlon	3rd	
Women's	1985 Outdoor	Carolyn Forde	3000 meters	6th	
Men's	1986 Indoor	William Skinner	55 meters hurdles	5th	
Men's	1987 Indoor	William Skinner	55 meters hurdles	7th	
Men's	1987 Indoor	William Skinner	High jump	6th	
Women's	1987 Indoor	Rosalind Taylor	1000 meters	7th	
Men's	1987 Outdoor	William Skinner	110 meters hurdles	6th	
Men's	1987 Outdoor	Mark Coogan	3000 meters steeplechase	7th	
Women's	1988 Outdoor	Rosalind Taylor	1500 meters	4th	
Women's	1989 Indoor	Rosalind Taylor	Mile run	3rd	
Women's	1989 Outdoor	Rosalind Taylor	1500 meters	2nd	
Women's	1991 Outdoor	Marchelle Payne	Triple jump	6th	
Women's	1992 Indoor	Marchelle Payne	Triple jump	4th	
Women's	1992 Outdoor	Marchelle Payne	Triple jump	4th	
Women's	1993 Indoor	Marchelle Payne	Triple jump	4th	
Women's	1996 Indoor	Kerrie Bowes	Mile run	8th	
Women's	2002 Indoor	Ruth Kura	Weight throw	8th	
Women's	2005 Indoor	Kierra Foster	Long jump	6th	
Men's	2006 Indoor	Dominic Berger	60 meters hurdles	5th	
Women's	2006 Indoor	Kierra Foster	Long jump	3rd	
Women's	2006 Indoor	Lynn Hernandez	Long jump	4th	
Men's	2006 Outdoor	Dominic Berger	110 meters hurdles	2nd	
Women's	2006 Outdoor	Kierra Foster	Long jump	5th	
Men's	2007 Indoor	Dominic Berger	60 meters hurdles	3rd	
Men's	2009 Indoor	Dwight Barbiasz	High jump	3rd	
Women's	2010 Indoor	Kiani Profit	Pentathlon	2nd	
Women's	2010 Outdoor	Kiani Profit	Heptathlon	2nd	
Men's	2011 Indoor	Dwight Barbiasz	High jump	4th	
Women's	2011 Indoor	Kiani Profit	Pentathlon	2nd	
Men's	2011 Outdoor	Dwight Barbiasz	High jump	5th	
Women's	2013 Outdoor	Thea Lafond	High jump	8th	
Women's	2014 Indoor	Amber Melville	High jump	7th	
Women's	2014 Outdoor	Amina Smith	High jump	5th	
Women's	2014 Outdoor	Amber Melville	High jump	7th	
Women's	2015 Indoor	Thea Lafond	High jump	5th	
Men's	2018 Outdoor	Gregory Thompson	Discus throw	2nd	

== See also ==
- Category:Maryland Terrapins men's track and field athletes (18)
- Category:Maryland Terrapins women's track and field athletes (3)
