= Paul H. Derr =

American football and track and field coach

Biographical details
- Born: June 15, 1903
- Died: March 12, 1976 (aged 72); Raleigh, North Carolina, U.S.

Playing career

Baseball
- 1923–1925: Illinois

Coaching career (HC unless noted)

Football
- 1935–1937: Lawrence

Track
- 1952–1970: NC State

Head coaching record
- Overall: 9–9–4 (football)

Paul Harold Derr (June 15, 1903 – March 12, 1976) was a collegiate American football and track and field coach. He served as the head football coach at Lawrence University in Appleton, Wisconsin from 1935 to 1937. He served later served as a track coach at North Carolina State University.
