= Temple Owls track and field =

College track and field team

- University: Temple University
- Head coach: Eric Mobley (men); Elvis Forde (women)
- Conference: The American
- Location: Philadelphia, Pennsylvania
- Outdoor track: Temple Sports Complex
- Nickname: Owls
- Colors: Cherry and white

The Temple Owls track and field team is the track and field program that represents Temple University. The Owls compete in NCAA Division I as a member of the American Conference. The team is based in Philadelphia, Pennsylvania at the Temple Sports Complex.

The program is coached by Eric Mobley (men) and Elvis Forde (women). The track and field program officially encompasses four teams, as the NCAA regards men's and women's indoor track and field and outdoor track and field as separate sports. In 2014, the Temple Athletics board eliminated the men's track and field team but kept men's cross country running.

Travis Mahoney, who finished 5th at the 2019 Pan American Games, was called "the best track and field athlete in school history".

== Postseason ==
=== AIAW ===
The Owls have had 5 individual AIAW All-Americans finishing in the top six at the AIAW indoor or outdoor championships.

AIAW All-Americans
Championships	Name	Event	Place
1973 Outdoor	Karen Moller	High jump	2nd
1974 Outdoor	Karen Moller	High jump	2nd
1978 Indoor	Jackie Daniels	440 yards	2nd
1978 Indoor	Unknown	4 × 440 yards relay	2nd
1978 Indoor	Unknown	4 × 440 yards relay	2nd
1978 Indoor	Unknown	4 × 440 yards relay	2nd
1978 Indoor	Unknown	4 × 440 yards relay	2nd
1979 Indoor	Edna Brown	300 yards	6th
1979 Indoor	Amy Whicker	4 × 220 yards relay	1st
1979 Indoor	Ellen Howard	4 × 220 yards relay	1st
1979 Indoor	Venita McDavid	4 × 220 yards relay	1st
1979 Indoor	Laura Carroll	4 × 220 yards relay	1st
1979 Outdoor	Edna Brown	400 meters hurdles	2nd
1979 Outdoor	Maggie Porter	Sprint medley relay	5th
1979 Outdoor	Grace Kennedy	Sprint medley relay	5th
1979 Outdoor	Gladys Boone	Sprint medley relay	5th
1979 Outdoor	Edna Brown	Sprint medley relay	5th
1980 Indoor	Edna Brown	4 × 220 yards relay	3rd
1980 Indoor	Amy Whicker	4 × 220 yards relay	3rd
1980 Indoor	Lesvia Jackson	4 × 220 yards relay	3rd
1980 Indoor	Gladys Boone	4 × 220 yards relay	3rd
1980 Indoor	Ellen Howard	4 × 440 yards relay	5th
1980 Indoor	Gladys Boone	4 × 440 yards relay	5th
1980 Indoor	Amy Whicker	4 × 440 yards relay	5th
1980 Indoor	Edna Brown	4 × 440 yards relay	5th
1980 Outdoor	Edna Brown	400 meters hurdles	2nd
1980 Outdoor	Ellen Howard	4 × 440 yards relay	5th
1980 Outdoor	Gladys Boone	4 × 440 yards relay	5th
1980 Outdoor	Amy Whicker	4 × 440 yards relay	5th
1980 Outdoor	Edna Brown	4 × 440 yards relay	5th
1981 Indoor	Venita McDavid	4 × 200 meters relay	6th
1981 Indoor	Gladys Boone	4 × 200 meters relay	6th
1981 Indoor	Amy Whicker	4 × 200 meters relay	6th
1981 Indoor	Lesvia Jackson	4 × 200 meters relay	6th
1981 Outdoor	Enda Brown	400 meters hurdles	2nd
1982 Indoor	Enda Brown	440 yards	2nd
1982 Outdoor	Glenda Tresdale	100 meters hurdles	4th
1982 Outdoor	Edna Brown	400 meters hurdles	1st
1982 Outdoor	Sharon Mitnik	Shot put	4th

=== NCAA ===
As of 2024, a total of 5 men and 2 women have achieved individual first-team All-American status at the men's outdoor, women's outdoor, men's indoor, or women's indoor national championships.

First team NCAA All-Americans
Team	Championships	Name	Event	Place	Ref.
Men's	1935 Outdoor	Eulace Peacock	100 meters	2nd	
Men's	1935 Outdoor	Eulace Peacock	Long jump	5th	
Men's	1935 Outdoor	David Smuckler	Shot put	5th	
Men's	1936 Outdoor	Al Threadgill	High jump	3rd	
Men's	1937 Outdoor	Eulace Peacock	Long jump	3rd	
Men's	1949 Outdoor	Dick Lyster	High jump	4th	
Men's	1971 Outdoor	Scott Poole	4 × 400 meters relay	8th	
Men's	1971 Outdoor	Doug Scott	4 × 400 meters relay	8th	
Men's	1971 Outdoor	Dominic Cordasco	4 × 400 meters relay	8th	
Men's	1971 Outdoor	Jim Elwell	4 × 400 meters relay	8th	
Women's	1985 Indoor	Cynthia Kirby	4 × 400 meters relay	4th	
Women's	1985 Indoor	Karen Woods	4 × 400 meters relay	4th	
Women's	1985 Indoor	Sharmaine Parkinson	4 × 400 meters relay	4th	
Women's	1985 Indoor	Penny Sparks	4 × 400 meters relay	4th	
Women's	1986 Indoor	Felicia Hodges	High jump	4th	
Women's	1986 Outdoor	Felicia Hodges	High jump	5th	
Women's	1987 Indoor	Felicia Hodges	High jump	5th	
Women's	1987 Outdoor	Felicia Hodges	High jump	4th	
Women's	1988 Indoor	Felicia Hodges	High jump	7th	
Women's	1988 Outdoor	Nadeen Bridgeforth	400 meters hurdles	5th	
Women's	1988 Outdoor	Felicia Hodges	High jump	2nd	
Men's	2012 Outdoor	Travis Mahoney	3000 meters steeplechase	5th	

== See also ==
- Category:Temple Owls men's track and field athletes (1)
