= Grace Hartman (runner) =

American long-distance runner

Personal information
- Born: 30 January 2004 (age 22)

Sport
- Sport: Athletics
- Events: Long-distance running, Cross country running

Grace Hartman (born 30 January 2004) is an American long-distance and cross country runner.

== Early life ==
From Ohio, Hartman attended Oakwood High School. She was named the 2020-21 Gatorade Ohio Girls Cross Country Player of the Year. In 2021. She committed to attend North Carolina State University.

== Career ==
Hartman won both the ACC Championship and the NCAA Southeast Regional cross country titles in 2024, competing for North Carolina State University, and was named the 2024 Atlantic Coast Conference Women’s Cross County Scholar-Athlete of the Year. Hartman then placed fifth at the 2024 NCAA Division I cross country championships in November 2024.

Hartman was nominated for the 2025 NCAA Woman of the Year Award after a season in which she set a new program, facility and meet record in the 10,000 metres at the Raleigh Relays, running 31:20.60 to move to third-fastest on the NCAA all-time list. In May, she also set a new 5000m personal best, running 14:58.11, in Durham, North Carolina. Hartman was runner-up to Pamela Kosgei over 10,000 metres at the 2025 NCAA Outdoor Championships in Eugene, Oregon in June 2025. She also placed fifth over 5000 metres two days later at the championships.

Hartman won the Nuttyville cross country race in Wisconsin in October 2025, leading teammate Angelina Napoleon in a North Carolina 1-2 finish. On 31 October, she placed fourth in the ACC individual cross country race, also helping North Carolina to the team title alongside race winner Napoleon, as well as Hannah Gapes and Sadie Engelhardt. On 22 November 2025, she placed sixth at the 2025 NCAA Cross Country Championships in Missouri, and won the team title with NC State. The following month, Hartman placed sixth in the 10 km race at the 2025 USA Cross Country Championships to gain automatic selection for the 2026 World Athletics Cross Country Championships in Tallahassee on 10 January 2026, where she finished 32nd overall to help the American team place fourth in the team competition.
