= Reggie Lawrence =

American football player (born 1970)

No. 80
- Position: Wide receiver

Personal information
- Born: September 4, 1969 (age 57); Camden, New Jersey, U.S.

Career information
- High school: Camden
- College: North Carolina State
- NFL draft: 1993: undrafted

Career history
- Philadelphia Eagles (1993)

Career NFL statistics
- Receptions: 1
- Receiving yards: 5
- Touchdowns: 0
- Stats at Pro Football Reference

Reginald James Lawrence (born April 12, 1970) is an American former professional football player who was a wide receiver in 1993 for the Philadelphia Eagles of the National Football League (NFL). He played college football for the NC State Wolfpack.

At North Carolina State University, Lawrence was also an accomplished sprinter for the Wolfpack track and field team. He was an All American at the 1991 NCAA Division I Outdoor Track and Field Championships running 3rd leg on the school's 4 × 100 meters relay team.
