= Bjørn Andersen (pole vaulter) =

Danish pole vaulter

Personal information
- Nationality: Danish
- Born: 31 May 1931
- Died: 25 August 2006 (aged 75)

Sport
- Sport: Athletics
- Event: Pole vault

Bjørn Andersen (31 May 1931 – 25 August 2006) was a Danish athlete. He competed in the men's pole vault at the 1960 Summer Olympics.

Andersen pole vaulted for the Maryland Terrapins track and field team, finishing 6th at the 1959 NCAA Track and Field Championships.
