= Angelina Napoleon =

American long-distance runner (born 2005)

Angelina Napolean
Personal information
- Nationality: USA
- Born: 3 March 2005 (age 21) Allegany, New York
- Education: North Carolina State University

Sport
- Sport: Athletics
- Event(s): Long-distance running, Middle-distance running, Steeplechase

Achievements and titles
- World finals: 2025
- Personal bests: Outdoor; 800 m: 2:06.37 (2025); 1500 m: 4:13.02 (2025); Mile: 4:49.30 (2022); 5000 m: 15:40.45 (2025); 3000 m sc: 9:10.72 (2025); Indoor; 800 m: 2:06.79 (2024); Mile: 4:41.57 (2025); 3000 m: 8:46.15 (2025)

Angelina Napoleon (born 3 March 2005) is an American middle- and long-distance runner and steeplechaser.

== Early life ==
From Allegany, New York, she was educated at Allegany-Limestone High School in New York. After graduating in 2023 she attended North Carolina State University.

== High School ==
In 2022, Napoleon became the American national high school record holder in the 2000 metres steeplechase with a time of 6:24.32. In June 2022, she won the New Balance Nationals Outdoor title in 6:30.51 in Philadelphia.

In 2023, she lowered her American national high school record and became national under-20 record holder in the 2000 metres steeplechase, and was named the Gatorade Girls Track and Field National Athlete of the Year. Her fastest time for the 2000m steeplechase that year was 6:18.41 at the NYSPHSAA State Championships. At the 2023 New Balance Nationals Outdoor Championship she successfully defended her steeplechase title in 6:19.53 and finished second in the 800 metres with a time of 2:05.53. That year she had a personal best of 2:03.97 in the 800m, and had a 4:46.38 personal best in the mile run.

== NCAA ==
In June 2024, Napoleon placed second in the women's 3000 metres steeplechase at the 2024 USATF U20 Outdoor Championships, running a time of 10:02.27 in Eugene, Oregon. She placed tenth in the 3000 metres steeplechase at the 2024 World Athletics U20 Championships in Lima, Peru in August 2024.

Competing for North Carolina State University, she won the Atlantic Coast Conference championship in the 3000m steeplechase on May 16, 2025, in Winston-Salem, running a meeting and school program record time of 9:27.85. She ran a personal best 9:16.66 to finish third in the 3000 metres steeplechase at the 2025 NCAA Outdoor Championships. That month, Napoleon travelled to France to debut in the Diamond League at the 2025 Meeting de Paris, running a personal best time of 9:10.72 to place seventh overall. In August 2025 Napoleon signed an NIL deal with adidas.

In October 2025, she was runner-up at the Nuttyville cross country race in Wisconsin, finishing behind teammate Grace Hartman in a North Carolina 1-2 finish. On 31 October, she won the ACC individual cross country title, also leading North Carolina to the team title alongside Hartman, Hannah Gapes and Sadie Engelhardt. On 22 November 2025, she competed at the 2025 NCAA Cross Country Championships in Missouri, and won the team title with NC State. On 14 March 2026, she had a top-ten finish at the 2026 NCAA Indoor Championships in the 3000 metres. In June, she qualified for the 2026 NCAA Outdoor Championships.

== Pro career ==
At the 2025 USA Outdoor Track and Field Championships in Eugene, Oregon in August 2025, Napoleon placed second in the final of the 3000 metres steeplechase, running 9:10.96. She was selected for the American team for the 2025 World Athletics Championships in Tokyo, Japan, where she ran 9:18.03 to qualify for the final. In the final on September 17, she finished ninth, running 9:17.44, and was the top American in the race.
