= 2024 NCAA Division I cross country championships =

2024 NCAA Division I Cross Country Championships
- Edition: 86th–Men; 44th–Women
- Date: November 23, 2024
- Host city: Madison, Wisconsin
- Venue: Thomas Zimmer Championship Course
- Distances: 10 km–Men; 6 km–Women

The 2024 NCAA Division I Cross Country Championships were the 86th annual NCAA Men's Division I Cross Country Championship and the 44th annual NCAA Women's Division I Cross Country Championship to determine the team and individual national champions of NCAA Division I men's and women's collegiate cross country running in the United States.

These championships were hosted by the University of Wisconsin–Madison at the Thomas Zimmer Championship Course in Madison, Wisconsin. Wisconsin was granted the bid in 2020.

In all, four different titles were contested: men's and women's individual and team championships.

== Results ==
=== Women's team ===
PL	Team	Total Time	Average Time	Score	1	2	3	4	5	(6)	(7)
1st place, gold medalist(s)	BYU	1:40:19	20:03	147	11	23	31	33	49	62	66
2nd place, silver medalist(s)	West Virginia	1:40:23	20:04	164	6	13	26	52	67	188	
3rd place, bronze medalist(s)	Providence	1:40:30	20:06	183	9	16	19	41	98	157	162
4	Northern Arizona	1:41:05	20:13	206	17	28	45	53	63	73	75
5	Oregon	1:40:48	20:09	210	10	20	24	77	79	97	125
6	Stanford	1:40:51	20:10	213	4	25	43	50	91	161	186
7	New Mexico	1:41:03	20:12	244	2	27	56	69	90	101	148
8	NC State	1:40:57	20:11	251	5	8	38	74	126	165	209
9	Georgetown	1:41:32	20:18	263	18	37	40	82	86	105	187
10	Alabama	1:41:16	20:15	293	1	22	64	65	141	185	194

=== Women's individual ===
Position	Name	Team	Time
1st place, gold medalist(s)	(Kenya) Doris Lemngole	Alabama	19:21.0
2nd place, silver medalist(s)	(Kenya) Pamela Kosgei	New Mexico	19:27.8
3rd place, bronze medalist(s)	(Kenya) Hilda Olemomoi	Florida	19:28.7
4	(Australia) Amy Bunnage	Stanford	19:31.1
5	(United States) Grace Hartman	NC State	19:39.5
6	(Canada) Ceili McCabe	West Virginia	19:41.2
7	(United States) Paityn Noe	Arkansas	19:42.3
8	(New Zealand) Hannah Gapes	NC State	19:42.7
9	(Canada) Chloe Thomas	Connecticut	19:43.5
10	(New Zealand) Kimberley May	Providence	19:45.1

=== Men's team ===
PL	Team	Total Time	Average Time	Score	1	2	3	4	5	(6)	(7)
1st place, gold medalist(s)	BYU	2:26:06	29:13	124	6	12	28	35	43	54	69
2nd place, silver medalist(s)	Iowa State	2:26:34	29:18	137	10	21	31	33	42	79	80
3rd place, bronze medalist(s)	Arkansas	2:26:53	29:22	202	4	19	20	48	111	156	192
4	Wisconsin	2:27:30	29:30	212	16	39	46	51	60	72	125
5	Northern Arizona	2:27:43	29:32	237	18	34	52	58	75	106	128
6	North Carolina	2:27:16	29:27	246	7	8	45	71	115	141	172
7	Wake Forest	2:27:59	29:35	256	29	41	49	53	84	117	138
8	Oklahoma State	2:27:21	29:28	256	5	11	61	88	91	101	186
9	New Mexico	2:27:34	29:30	272	2	32	36	82	120	157	197
10	Notre Dame	2:28:45	29:45	337	22	40	76	83	116	133	142

=== Men's individual ===
Position	Name	Team	Time
1st place, gold medalist(s)	(United States) Graham Blanks	Harvard	28:37.2
2nd place, silver medalist(s)	(Eritrea) Habtom Samuel	New Mexico	28:38.9
3rd place, bronze medalist(s)	(United States) Dylan Schubert	Furman	28:39.6
4	(Sudan) Yaseen Abdalla	Arkansas	28:41.5
5	(Kenya) Brian Musau	Oklahoma State	28:44.9
6	(United States) Casey Clinger	BYU	28:45.1
7	(United States) Parker Wolfe	North Carolina	28:50.2
8	(United States) Ethan Strand	North Carolina	28:53.0
9	(United States) Liam Murphy	Villanova	28:55.7
10	(Spain) Said Mechaal	Iowa State	28:59.8

== See also ==
- NCAA Men's Division II Cross Country Championship
- NCAA Women's Division II Cross Country Championship
- NCAA Men's Division III Cross Country Championship
- NCAA Women's Division III Cross Country Championship

== Results ==
- 2024 NCAA Division I Cross Country Championships live results
- 2024 NCAA Division I Cross Country Championships TFRRS results
