= Danny Peebles =

American football player (born 1966)

No. 83, 80
- Position: Wide receiver

Personal information
- Born: May 30, 1966 (age 60); Raleigh, North Carolina, U.S.
- Listed height: 5 ft 11 in (1.80 m)
- Listed weight: 180 lb (82 kg)

Career information
- High school: Broughton (Raleigh)
- College: North Carolina State
- NFL draft: 1989: 2nd round, 33rd overall pick

Career history
- Tampa Bay Buccaneers (1989–1990); Cleveland Browns (1991)

Career NFL statistics
- Receptions: 17
- Receiving yards: 230
- Touchdowns: 1
- Stats at Pro Football Reference

Daniel Percy Peebles III (born May 30, 1966) is an American former professional football player who was a wide receiver in the National Football League (NFL) for the Tampa Bay Buccaneers and Cleveland Browns.

He was selected by the Buccaneers in the second round of the 1989 NFL draft. His first three receptions as an NFL rookie in 89' averaged 28.3 yards. Peebles attended North Carolina State. As a senior, he caught 23 passes for 439 yards, including a 75-yard touchdown catch in the Peach Bowl.

Running for the NC State Wolfpack track and field team, Peebles won the 4 × 100 meters relay at the 1985 NCAA Division I Outdoor Track and Field Championships. Peebles was also the 200 m runner-up at the 1988 NCAA Division I Indoor Track and Field Championships for the North Carolina State Wolfpack track and field team.

In a game against the Houston Oilers at the Astrodome, on November 17, 1991, Peebles was involved in a helmet-to-helmet collision with Bubba McDowell. He suffered from loss of feeling and movement in his arms and legs for approximately 10 minutes after being hit during a third-quarter pass. Peebles retired from the NFL on December 3, 1991.
