= Elly Henes =

American athlete

Personal information
- Full name: Elena Henes
- Nickname: Elly Henes
- Born: October 13, 1998 (age 28) Raleigh, North Carolina
- Home town: Cary, North Carolina, Flagstaff, Arizona
- Employer: Adidas
- Height: 5.2 ft (1.6 m)

Sport
- Country: United States
- Sport: Track and field
- Events: 1500 meters 3000 meters 5000 meters 10,000 meters
- College team: North Carolina State University
- Coached by: Bob Henes (2025 - present); Laurie Henes (2016–2021); Roger Collins (2012–2016)

Achievements and titles
- Personal bests: Outdoor; 1500 m: 4:05.71 (Los Angeles, 2022); 3000 m: 8:36.86 (Oslo, 2023); 5000 m: 14:47.15 (London, 2023); 10,000 m: 30:48.26 (San Juan Capistrano, 2023)

Elly Henes (born October 13, 1998) is an American athlete who competes primarily in the 5000 metres.

== Career ==
In 2021, Adidas sponsored Elly Henes.

=== National championships ===
| Year | Competition | Venue | Position | Event | Notes |
|---|---|---|---|---|---|
| 2021 | US Olympic Trials | Eugene, Oregon | 6th | 5000 m | 15:47.73 |
| 2021 | USATF Road 6km Championships | Canton, Ohio | 3rd | 6 km | 18:35 |
| 2022 | USATF Indoor Championships | Spokane, Washington | 6th | 3000 m | 8:54.13 |
| 2022 | USATF Outdoor Championships | Eugene, Oregon | 9th | 5000 m | 16:00.08 |
| 2023 | USATF Indoor Championships | Albuquerque, New Mexico | 4th | 3000 m | 8:58.40 |
| 2023 | USATF Outdoor Championships | Eugene, Oregon | 5th | 5000 m | 15:08.66 |

== NCAA ==
Elly Henes is a 2021 NCAA 5000 meters outdoor track and field champion, 10-time NCAA Division I All-American, 6-time Atlantic Coast Conference champion.

Representing NC State Wolfpack
| Year | Competition | Venue | Position | Event | Time |
|---|---|---|---|---|---|
| 2021 | 2021 NCAA Outdoor Track and Field Championships | University of Oregon | 1st | 5000 m | 15:28.05 |
| 2021 | ACC Outdoor Track and Field Championships | North Carolina State University | 4th | 1500 m | 4:10.23 |
| 2021 | ACC Outdoor Track and Field Championships | North Carolina State University | 1st | 5000 m | 15:34.69 |
| 2021 | 2021 NCAA Indoor Track and Field Championships | University of Arkansas | 12th | 3000 m | 9:19.29 |
| 2021 | 2021 NCAA Indoor Track and Field Championships | University of Arkansas | 3rd | 5000 m | 15:49.86 |
| 2021 | ACC Indoor Track and Field Championships | Clemson University | 1st | 3000 m | 9:00.53 |
| 2021 | ACC Indoor Track and Field Championships | Clemson University | 1st | DMR | 11:07.64 |

== Personal life ==
Born in Raleigh, North Carolina, Elly Henes is the daughter of NC State Wolfpack standouts student-athletes Bob and Laurie Henes. Laurie (Gomez) Henes is the current North Carolina State University cross country head coach.

== High School ==
Elly Henes attended Green Hope High School where she became the 2016 North Carolina High School Athletic Association 4A Indoor State Championship MVP, 2015 and 2016 New Balance Indoor Nationals 3000m & 2-mile (3.2 km) qualifier, 2015 New Balance Indoor Grand Prix 1 mile qualifier, 2016 Penn Relays Carnival 1 mile Qualifier, 2013, 2014, 2015 Nike Cross Nationals Qualifier, 2014 Nike Cross Nationals All-American, 2013–15 3x NCHSAA State Champion – (2015 3,200m outdoor, 2015 3,200m indoor, 2015 indoor 1,600m), 4x NCHSAA Track State Championships runner up, 2014 NCHSSAA XC State Champion. 2015 NCHSSA XC Runner-up, 2013 NCHSSA XC 3rd place, 3-time N&O Cross Country Runner of the Year 2013–15.

Henes won 2014-15 Gatorade Player of the Year awards for North Carolina Girls Cross Country Runners of the Year.
