= Sherron Walker =

American long jumper

Personal information
- Nationality: American
- Born: April 17, 1956 (age 70)
- Spouse: Sean Boyea

Sport
- Sport: Athletics
- Event: Long jump

Sherron Walker (born April 17, 1956) is an American athlete. She competed in the women's long jump at the 1976 Summer Olympics. In 2012, Walker was inducted into the Snohomish County Sports Hall of Fame.

== Early life ==
Walker grew up in Everett, Washington and attended Everett High School. In high school, Walker competed in sprint and relay races and did the high jump. By the time Walker graduated in 1975, she had won four consecutive state crowns.

Walker competed in the AIAW for the Seattle Pacific Falcons and the Long Beach State Beach track and field teams, placing 5th in the long jump at the 1978 AIAW Outdoor Track and Field Championships.
