= Janet Smith (runner) =

American long-distance runner (1965–2025)

Medal record

Women's athletics

Representing the United States

World Cross Country Championships
| Gold medal – first place | 1987 Warszawa | Team |

Janet Smith-Leet (December 11, 1965 – October 12, 2025) was an American long-distance runner who competed in the 5000-meter run, 10000-meter run and cross country.

== Biography ==
From Edison, New Jersey, Smith attended J. P. Stevens High School, and was one of the most accomplished New Jersey high school cross country runners of all time. She won three individual state cross country championships. She was named girls high school MVP at the 1984 Penn Relays and was the only runner from New Jersey to win the Foot Locker Cross Country Championships (1983).

While attending NC State she became a ten time All-American in both cross country and track.

Smith was selected to represent her country for the 1987 and 1990 IAAF World Cross Country Championships. The 1987 team won the gold medal with Smith finishing 23rd.

Smith died on October 12, 2025, at the age of 59.
