= Mary Shea =

American politician

Member-elect of the Idaho House of Representatives from the 29A district
- Assuming office December 2026
- Succeeding: Dustin Manwaring

Personal details
- Party: Democratic

Mary Shea is an American politician. A member of the Democratic Party, she is the member-elect for the 29A district of the Idaho House of Representatives.
