= Hannah Gapes =

New Zealand long-distance runner

Personal information
- Born: 28 November 2003 (age 22)

Sport
- Sport: Athletics
- Events: Long-distance running, Cross country running

Achievements and titles
- Personal bests: Outdoor; 800 m: 2:13.09 (2022); 1500 m: 4:07.44 (2026); 5000 m: 15:25.93 (2026); Indoor; Mile: 4:35.54 (2025); 3000 m: 8:48.96 (2025)

Hannah Gapes (born 28 November 2003) is a New Zealand long-distance and cross country runner. Gapes became New Zealand women's senior cross country champion for the first time in 2025.

Competing for North Carolina State University, Gapes won the 2026 NCAA Cross Country Championship.

== Biography ==
From Rotorua in the Bay of Plenty, Gapes started running in primary school, before attending John Paul College. She ran as a member of Lake City Athletics Club, and after overcoming a diagnosis of anemia in 2019, won the senior girls 1500 metres title at the 2020 NZ Secondary Schools Track and Field Champs in Tauranga. By the age of 17 years-old, Gapes was New Zealand national under-20 champion over 5000 metres. She later moved to the United States to compete in the Collegiate system for North Carolina State University.

Gapes placed eighth overall at the 2024 NCAA Cross Country Championships in November 2024. She placed tenth overall at the 2025 NCAA Division 1 Championships Indoor 3000 metres race, before a stress fracture ruled her out of the 2025 NCAA outdoor season. Gapes won the 10 km senior women's race at the New Zealand Cross Country Championships in Christchurch in August 2025, gaining automatic selection for the 2026 World Athletics Cross Country Championships, held in Tallahassee, Florida.

On 3 October 2025, she won the Sean Earl Loyola Lakefront Invitational cross country race in Chicago. On 31 October, she placed fifth in the ACC individual cross country race, also helping North Carolina State to win the team title. On 14 November she finished runner-up at the NCAA Southeast regional cross country championship as North Carolina State again won the team event. On 22 November 2025, she placed fifth at the 2025 NCAA Cross Country Championships in Missouri, and won the team title with NC State.

On 10 January 2026, Gapes placed 19th at the 2026 World Athletics Cross Country Championships in Tallahassee. In June, at the 2026 NCAA Outdoor Championships, Gapes ran a personal best in the 5000 metres, running 15:25.93. Competing in the 5k at the 2026 World Athletics Road Running Championships in Copenhagen in September 2026, she finished ninth. The following month, competing for North Carolina State, Gapes broke Katelyn Tuohy's course record to win the Joe Piane Invite at Notre Dame, and won the Under Armour Pre-National Invitational in Terre Haute in a time of 18:57.6 to win by more than 17 seconds and set a course record as the first woman under 19 minutes on the LaVern Gibson 6k course. That month, Gapes won the 2026 ACC Women's Cross Country individual title, setting another meeting record with 18:23.80 in Blacksburg, Virginia for the 6km course. She continued her season with a win the following weekend by claiming the individual Southeast Region title, where she again broke a course record previously set by Katelyn Tuohy. Gapes completed an unbeaten cross country season with victory at the 2026 NCAA Cross Country Championships by seven seconds, and breaking her own course record at the LaVern Gibson Cross Country Course in Terre Haute, Indiana.
