= Gladys Boone =

English-born American economist (1895-1982)

- Boone, from a 1922 newspaper
- Born: January 31, 1895; Stoke-upon-Trent, Staffordshire, U.K.
- Died: April 23, 1982 (aged 87); Lynchburg, Virginia, U.S.
- Occupations: Economist, college professor

Gladys Boone (January 31, 1895 – April 23, 1982) was an English-born American economist and college professor. She was on the faculty at Sweet Briar College from 1931 to 1960.

== Early life and education ==
Boone was born in Stoke-upon-Trent, the daughter of Frederick T. Boone and Florence Adams Boone. She graduated from the University of Birmingham, where she earned a bachelor's degree in 1916 and a master's degree in 1917. Her master's thesis was titled "The Poor Law of 1601, with some consideration of modern developments of the Poor Law problem." She completed a doctorate in economics at Columbia University in 1941, with a dissertation titled "The Women's Trade Union Leagues in Great Britain and the United States of America".

== Career ==
Boone was a tutor for the Workers' Educational Association in Birmingham after college. As a graduate student in the United States, she taught at Bryn Mawr College and at Carnegie Institute of Technology in Pittsburgh, and was an assistant editor of a social sciences encyclopedia. In 1923 she was executive secretary of the Philadelphia branch of the Women's Trade Union League, and taught at Philadelphia Labor College. In summer 1924 she taught at the Woolman School.

Boone became a professor at Sweet Briar College in 1931, chaired the social studies division there. She chaired the economics committee of the Lynchburg Interracial Commission in the 1930s, spoke to women's clubs, traveled in the Soviet Union, and was active with the YWCA and was a director of the Virginia Consumers' League. During World War II she worked with the National War Labor Board. She was vice president of the Southern Economic Association, and contributed to the Encyclopædia Brittanica. She retired from Sweet Briar College in 1960.

== Publications ==
- "British Workers at Oxford" (1926, The Survey)
- Labor Laws in Twelve Southern States (1934)
- "League Seeks Shorter Hours; Early History of Fight for Better Working Conditions Recalled" (1937)
- Labor Laws of Virginia (1940)
- The Women's Trade Union Leagues in Great Britain and the United States of America (1942)

== Personal life ==
Boone died in 1982, at a nursing home in Lynchburg, Virginia, at the age of 87. She donated 1930s-era toys, books, photographs, postcards, and possibly propaganda posters from the USSR to the library at Sweet Briar College.
