= Margaret Groos =

American long-distance runner

Margaret Keyes Groos (born September 21, 1959) is a retired long-distance runner from the United States. She competed for the United States in the marathon at the 1988 Summer Olympics.

Groos was born and raised in Nashville, Tennessee, where she graduated from Harpeth Hall School in 1977. As a ninth grader, she set the national record for the 880 yard run (2:10.06). As a senior, she set a state record in the 1600 meters (4:45.44) that wasn't broken for 40 years. Overall, she won state championships in the 880 yard and the mile run three times, each, while being part of a state champion mile relay and twice being part of Harpeth Hall's state championship team (and being part of their runner-up team another year).

She was recruited to the University of Virginia (UVA), which she attended from 1977 to 1982. Groos was a 1979 USA Track & Field Champion in cross-country and was an AIAW All-American while at Virginia. As of 2002 she was the UVA Outdoor record holder for the 5,000m (15:51.24, 1980), 3,000m (9:07.84, 1979), the Indoor record holder for 3,200m (9:52.24, 1980) and 5,000m (15:34.74,1981).

Groos ran her first marathon at the 1983 Los Angeles Marathon, where she placed seventh in 2:37:02. In 1984 she finished fifth in the US Olympic Trials in the marathon, and was an alternate for the 1984 Summer Olympics. Several months after the 1984 trials, she developed what she described as "terrifying symptoms." "My pulse at rest was 100," she said, "and it went up to 250 if I tried to run even two steps. I couldn't run a single mile in eight minutes without passing out." After 10 months she was diagnosed with Graves' disease, an autoimmune disease that affects the thyroid. With medication she eventually recovered her form and in 1988 she won the Pittsburgh Marathon, with a personal best and a course record for women of 2:29:50. As of 2025 it remains the course record. She won the Pittsburgh Marathon a second time in 1989 with a time of 2:32:39.

Groos represented the United States in the marathon at the 1988 Summer Olympics in Seoul, South Korea. She finished 39th with a time of 2:40:59. She continued to race in road races professionally through 1994.

== Personal ==
Groos is married to Paul Sloan. They have two children. Their daughter, Emma, won the Tennessee state cross country championship in 2014 (18:36.25); earlier in high school, she'd finished 4th, 3rd, and then 2nd in the state championships.

== Achievements ==
- All results regarding marathon, unless stated otherwise

Year	Competition	Venue	Position	Notes
Representing United States
1988	Pittsburgh Marathon	Pittsburgh, United States	1st	2:29:50
1988	Olympic Games	Seoul, South Korea	39th	2:40:59
1989	Pittsburgh Marathon	Pittsburgh, United States	1st	2:32:39
