= Kathy Weston =

American middle-distance runner

Kathleen "Kathy" Stella Weston (born May 19, 1958, in Reno, Nevada) is a retired female middle-distance runner from the United States. She set her personal best (2.00.73) in the women's 800 metres at the 1976 Olympic trials. She was also a member of the 1976 US Olympic team in the 800 metres.

Weston represented three different schools over her career in AIAW competition, competing in the 400 m and 800 m for the UCLA Bruins, Cal State Northridge Matadors, and the Oregon State Beavers.

== Achievements ==
Year	Tournament	Venue	Result	Extra
1975	Pan American Games	Mexico City, Mexico	1st	800 m
1975	Pan American Games	Mexico City, Mexico	2nd	4 × 400 m
