= Paula Girven =

American high jumper (1958–2020)

Personal information
- Full name: Paula Darcel Girven
- National team: United States
- Born: January 12, 1958 Virginia
- Died: October 17, 2020 (aged 62) Asheville, North Carolina
- Home town: Tampa, Florida
- Education: Gar-Field High School, Woodbridge, Virginia, 1976; University of Maryland, Bachelor of General Studies, 1981
- Occupation: Personal trainer

Sport
- Country: United States
- Sport: Track and field
- Event: High jump
- University team: University of Maryland
- Retired: 1981

Achievements and titles
- Olympic finals: 1976 Summer Olympics

Paula Girven (January 12, 1958 – October 17, 2020) was an American athlete. She competed in the women's high jump at the 1976 Summer Olympics.

After graduating from Gar-Field High School in Woodbridge, Virginia, Girven qualified for the 1976 Summer Olympics in Montreal, later being placed 18th. Girven also qualified for the 1980 U.S. Olympic Team, but never competed as a result of the international boycott.

Girven retired from competition in 1981, later becoming a personal trainer.

== Death ==
On October 17, 2020, Girven died from cancer.
