= Julie Shea =

American long-distance runner

Julie Shea (born 3 May 1959) is a former American long-distance runner and politician. In 1977, she was named "High School Athlete of the Year" setting a national record for the mile. While at North Carolina State, she led the cross country team to two national titles. She served on the Raleigh City Council in the 1990s. Shea placed third in the 1981 New York City Marathon and fourth in the 1981 Boston Marathon.

== Early life ==
While at Cardinal Gibbons High School in Raleigh, North Carolina, she was the first Track and Field News "High School Athlete of the Year" in 1977. As a senior in 1977, she set the national mile record for female high-school runners, with a time of 4:43.1. The record stood as a North Carolina record until 2012, when Wesley Frazier of Ravenscroft School broke it.

== College career ==
At North Carolina State, Shea led the cross country team to two national titles, won two individual cross country championships, and won five individual track and field titles.

While in track and field at North Carolina State she became, in 1980 and 1981, the only female athlete honored with the Anthony J. McKevlin Award, noting athlete of the year in the Atlantic Coast Conference. (In 1990, the award began to be awarded only to male athletes and a separate award was started to honor women.)

In 1980, she won the Broderick Award (now the Honda Sports Award) as the nation's best female collegiate track and field athlete and the same award for cross country in 1981. In addition, she was awarded the Broderick Cup, given to the nation's best female collegiate athlete.

In 1993, Shea was inducted into the North Carolina Sports Hall of Fame and in 2012 she was part of the inaugural class of the NC State Athletic Hall of Fame.

== Post college ==
In the 1990s, Shea was thrice elected to Raleigh City Council. As of 2012 she coached CoolKidsRun in Raleigh.

== Notable marathoning achievements ==
- All results regarding marathon, unless stated otherwise

| Year | Competition | Venue | Position | Notes |
Representing the United States
| 1981 | New York City Marathon | New York City, United States | 3rd | 2:30:11,6 |
| 1981 | Boston Marathon | Boston, United States | 4th | 2:30:54 |
