= 1975 AIAW Outdoor Track and Field Championships =

U.S. women's athletics collegiate championship event

- Dates: May 16–17, 1975
- Host city: Corvallis, Oregon; Oregon State University
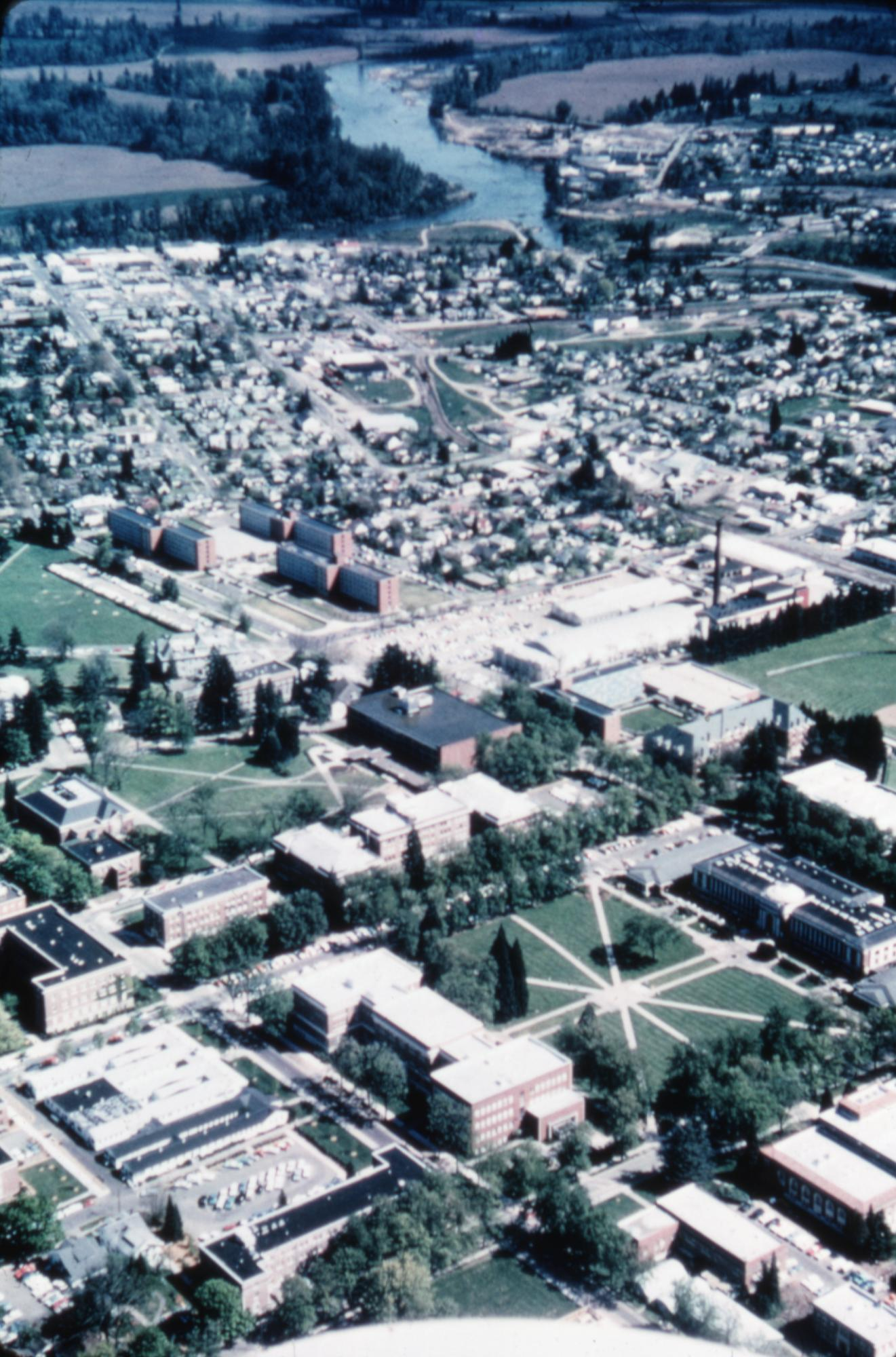

The 1975 AIAW Outdoor Track And Field Championships were the 7th annual Association for Intercollegiate Athletics for Women-sanctioned track meet to determine the individual and team national champions of women's collegiate track and field events in the United States. They were contested May 16−17, 1975 in Corvallis, Oregon by host Oregon State University. There were not separate AIAW Division I, II, and III championships for outdoor track and field until 1981.

Oregon State's track built in 1974 was the first in the United States to use metric rather than US customary units, based on a circuit of 400 meters rather than 440 yards. For the first time AIAW championship relays were held at metric distances, but most other events still used imperial measurements.

At least 101 schools participated. The top scorer was UCLA's Julie Brown, who set meet records in the mile and 2-mile and finished runner-up in the half-mile in a feat that was described UCLA coach Chuck Debus as "the best performance by an American distance runner I have ever seen".

== Team standings ==
- Scoring: 10 points for a 1st-place finish, 8 points for 2nd, 6 points for 3rd, 4 points for 4th, 2 points for 5th, and 1 point for 6th. Top 10 teams shown.

Rank	Team	Points
1st place, gold medalist(s)	UCLA Bruins	89
2nd place, silver medalist(s)	Prairie View A&M Lady Panthers	71
3rd place, bronze medalist(s)	Texas Woman's Pioneers	31
4th	Colorado State Rams	27
4th	Michigan State Spartans	27
6th	Western Oregon Wolves	23
7th	Iowa State Cyclones	22
8th	Oregon State Beavers	20
9th	Oregon Ducks	18
10th	Cal State Los Angeles Golden Eagles	16
10th	Chicago State Cougars	16
10th	Flathead Valley Mountainettes	16
10th	Kansas State Wildcats	16

== Results ==
- Only top six results of finals are shown

100 yards
Pl.	Name	Team	Mark
1st place, gold medalist(s)	Veronica Harris	Chicago State Cougars	11.18
2nd place, silver medalist(s)	Pam Riggs	Central Washington Wildcats	11.20
3rd place, bronze medalist(s)	Rosetta Birt	USC Trojans	11.28
4th	Carol Cummings	Prairie View A&M Lady Panthers	11.29
5th	Emelia Edet	Western Oregon Wolves	11.42
6th	Beverly Day	Prairie View A&M Lady Panthers	11.47

220 yards
Pl.	Name	Team	Mark
1st place, gold medalist(s)	Karyn Dennis	Michigan State Spartans	24.96
2nd place, silver medalist(s)	Pam Greene	Colorado State Rams	25.00
3rd place, bronze medalist(s)	Veronica Harris	Chicago State Cougars	25.06
4th	Pam Riggs	Central Washington Wildcats	25.07
5th	Marjorie Grimmett	Michigan State Spartans	24.14
6th	Beverly Day	Prairie View A&M Lady Panthers	25.26

440 yards
Pl.	Name	Team	Mark
1st place, gold medalist(s)	Jarvis Scott	Cal State Los Angeles Golden Eagles	54.92
2nd place, silver medalist(s)	Shirley Williams	Prairie View A&M Lady Panthers	55.45
3rd place, bronze medalist(s)	Ruth Alexander	Flathead Valley Mountainettes	55.80
4th	Debbie Roberson	UCLA Bruins	55.87
5th	Sherry Edwards	Iowa State Cyclones	56.74
6th	Sue Latter	Michigan State Spartans	57.15

880 yards
Pl.	Name	Team	Mark
1st place, gold medalist(s)	Wendy Knudson	Colorado State Rams	2:05.97
2nd place, silver medalist(s)	Julie Brown	UCLA Bruins	2:08.48
3rd place, bronze medalist(s)	Liane Swegle	Seattle Redhawks	2:08.54
4th	Marilyn Neufville	California Golden Bears	2:08.59
5th	Marilyn Carlson	Central Missouri Jennies	2:09.49
6th	Kate Keyes	UCLA Bruins	2:09.78

Mile run
Pl.	Name	Team	Mark
1st place, gold medalist(s)	Julie Brown	UCLA Bruins	4:40.58
2nd place, silver medalist(s)	Kate Keyes	UCLA Bruins	4:42.09
3rd place, bronze medalist(s)	Cindy Bremser	Wisconsin Badgers	4:44.89
4th	Peg Neppel	Iowa State Cyclones	4:45.41
5th	Kathy Gibbons	Arizona State Sun Devils	4:47.20
6th	Carol Cook	Missouri State Lady Bears	4:52.14

2 miles
Pl.	Name	Team	Mark
1st place, gold medalist(s)	Julie Brown	UCLA Bruins	10:11.20
2nd place, silver medalist(s)	Peg Neppel	Iowa State Cyclones	10:11.66
3rd place, bronze medalist(s)	Kate Keyes	UCLA Bruins	10:12.45
4th	Eileen Claugus	UC Davis Aggies	10:22.19
5th	Carol Cook	Missouri State Lady Bears	10:25.21
6th	Cindy Bremser	Wisconsin Badgers	10:30.25

100 m hurdles
Pl.	Name	Team	Mark
1st place, gold medalist(s)	Andrea Bruce	Prairie View A&M Lady Panthers	14.18
2nd place, silver medalist(s)	Emelia Edet	Western Oregon Wolves	14.69
3rd place, bronze medalist(s)	Lucy Vaamonde	Texas Woman's Pioneers	14.79
4th	Suzie Winningham	Oklahoma State Cowgirls	14.82
5th	Clydine Crowder	UCLA Bruins	14.93
6th	Mary Ayers	Prairie View A&M Lady Panthers	15.02

400 m hurdles
Pl.	Name	Team	Mark
1st place, gold medalist(s)	Mary Ayers	Prairie View A&M Lady Panthers	59.75
2nd place, silver medalist(s)	Andrea Bruce	Prairie View A&M Lady Panthers	59.99
3rd place, bronze medalist(s)	Michele Hopper	Cal State Los Angeles Golden Eagles	1:01.55
4th	Clydine Crowder	UCLA Bruins	1:01.96
5th	Denise Anderson	Seattle Pacific Falcons	1:03.39
6th	Jeri Bonnell	Colorado State Rams	1:03.74

4 × 100 m relay
Pl.	Name	Team	Mark
1st place, gold medalist(s)	Beverly Day	Prairie View A&M Lady Panthers	46.21
1st place, gold medalist(s)	Charlene Branch	Prairie View A&M Lady Panthers	46.21
1st place, gold medalist(s)	Andrea Bruce	Prairie View A&M Lady Panthers	46.21
1st place, gold medalist(s)	Carol Cummings	Prairie View A&M Lady Panthers	46.21
2nd place, silver medalist(s)	Marjorie Grimmett	Michigan State Spartans	47.44
2nd place, silver medalist(s)	Laurel Vietzke	Michigan State Spartans	47.44
2nd place, silver medalist(s)	Sue Latter	Michigan State Spartans	47.44
2nd place, silver medalist(s)	Karyn Dennis	Michigan State Spartans	47.44
3rd place, bronze medalist(s)	Debbie Roberson	UCLA Bruins	47.64
3rd place, bronze medalist(s)	Chris A'Harrah	UCLA Bruins	47.64
3rd place, bronze medalist(s)	Laurie Huggard	UCLA Bruins	47.64
3rd place, bronze medalist(s)	Gayle Butler	UCLA Bruins	47.64
4th		Texas Woman's Pioneers 'Y'	47.85
5th		Texas Woman's Pioneers 'X'	47.93
6th		Chico State Wildcats	48.09

4 × 400 m relay
Pl.	Name	Team	Mark
1st place, gold medalist(s)	Candace Glover	Prairie View A&M Lady Panthers	3:45.06
1st place, gold medalist(s)	Mary Ayers	Prairie View A&M Lady Panthers	3:45.06
1st place, gold medalist(s)	Carol Cummings	Prairie View A&M Lady Panthers	3:45.06
1st place, gold medalist(s)	Shirley Williams	Prairie View A&M Lady Panthers	3:45.06
2nd place, silver medalist(s)	Wendy Knudson	Colorado State Rams	3:45.23
2nd place, silver medalist(s)	Pam Greene	Colorado State Rams	3:45.23
2nd place, silver medalist(s)	Patricia Koehler	Colorado State Rams	3:45.23
2nd place, silver medalist(s)	Jeri Bonnell	Colorado State Rams	3:45.23
3rd place, bronze medalist(s)		Seattle Pacific Falcons	3:50.19
4th		Iowa State Cyclones	3:51.04
5th		Texas Woman's Pioneers	3:57.06
6th		Florida Gators	3:57.4

Sprint medley relay (Note: Held at a total distance of 800 m, with the first leg running 200 m, the middle two legs running 100 m, and the anchor leg running 400 m.)
Pl.	Name	Team	Mark
1st place, gold medalist(s)	Gayle Butler	UCLA Bruins	1:44.96
1st place, gold medalist(s)	Laurie Huggard	UCLA Bruins	1:44.96
1st place, gold medalist(s)	Sharon White	UCLA Bruins	1:44.96
1st place, gold medalist(s)	Chris A'Harrah	UCLA Bruins	1:44.96
2nd place, silver medalist(s)		Texas Woman's Pioneers 'X'	1:45.23
3rd place, bronze medalist(s)	Rosetta Birt	USC Trojans	1:45.50
3rd place, bronze medalist(s)	Harrieth Knight	USC Trojans	1:45.50
3rd place, bronze medalist(s)	Angela Hunter	USC Trojans	1:45.50
3rd place, bronze medalist(s)	Anna Biller	USC Trojans	1:45.50
4th		Texas Woman's Pioneers 'Y'	1:46.15
5th	Diane Grout	Kansas State Wildcats	1:47.22
5th	Sharon McKee	Kansas State Wildcats	1:47.22
5th	Jan Smith	Kansas State Wildcats	1:47.22
5th	Leesa Wallace	Kansas State Wildcats	1:47.22
6th		Iowa State Cyclones	1:47.13

High jump
Pl.	Name	Team	Mark
1st place, gold medalist(s)	Joni Huntley	Oregon State Beavers	6 ft 0 1/4 in (1.83 m)
2nd place, silver medalist(s)	Sue Von Behren	Parkside Rangers	5 ft 6 in (1.67 m)
3rd place, bronze medalist(s)	Judy Sheets	Ball State Cardinals	5 ft 5 in (1.65 m)
4th	Peggy Rose	Texas Woman's Pioneers	5 ft 4 in (1.62 m)
5th	Marilyn Wiese	Nebraska–Kearney Lopers	5 ft 4 in (1.62 m)
6th	Pat Hodgson	Iowa State Cyclones	5 ft 4 in (1.62 m)

Long jump
Pl.	Name	Team	Mark
1st place, gold medalist(s)	Joni Huntley	Oregon State Beavers	19 ft 3 1/4 in (5.87 m)
2nd place, silver medalist(s)	Mary Ayers	Prairie View A&M Lady Panthers	18 ft 8 1/2 in (5.7 m)
3rd place, bronze medalist(s)	Laurel Vietzke	Michigan State Spartans	18 ft 5 in (5.61 m)
4th	Charlotte Lewis	Illinois State Redbirds	18 ft 3 in (5.56 m)
5th	Beatrice Emodi	UNLV Rebels	18 ft 3 in (5.56 m)
6th	Colette Winlock	Cal State East Bay Pioneers	17 ft 11 3/4 in (5.48 m)

Shot put
Pl.	Name	Team	Mark
1st place, gold medalist(s)	Suzie Snider	Baylor Bears	48 ft 1 in (14.65 m)
2nd place, silver medalist(s)	Evelyn Okeke	Western Oregon Wolves	46 ft 7 1/4 in (14.2 m)
3rd place, bronze medalist(s)	Lynette Matthews	Seattle Pacific Falcons	45 ft 4 1/2 in (13.83 m)
4th	Karen Marshall	Oregon Ducks	45 ft 2 3/4 in (13.78 m)
5th	Lorna Griffin	Flathead Valley Mountainettes	44 ft 4 1/4 in (13.51 m)
6th	Diana McCann	Indiana State Sycamores	43 ft 3 in (13.18 m)

Discus throw
Pl.	Name	Team	Mark
1st place, gold medalist(s)	Monette Driscoll	UCLA Bruins	156 ft 5 in (47.67 m)
2nd place, silver medalist(s)	Lorna Griffin	Flathead Valley Mountainettes	147 ft 5 1/2 in (44.94 m)
3rd place, bronze medalist(s)	Lynne Winbigler	Oregon Ducks	147 ft 4 in (44.9 m)
4th	Suzie Snider	Baylor Bears	143 ft 7 1/2 in (43.77 m)
5th	Lynette Matthews	Seattle Pacific Falcons	140 ft 8 1/2 in (42.88 m)
6th	Lori Lyford	Whitworth Pirates	137 ft 1 in (41.78 m)

Javelin throw
Pl.	Name	Team	Mark
1st place, gold medalist(s)	Kathy Schmidt	UCLA Bruins	198 ft 1 in (60.37 m)
2nd place, silver medalist(s)	Marsha Poppe	Kansas State Wildcats	149 ft 11 in (45.69 m)
3rd place, bronze medalist(s)	Susie Norton	Kansas State Wildcats	149 ft 3 1/2 in (45.5 m)
4th	Marcia Melvin	Western Oregon Wolves	148 ft 9 in (45.33 m)
5th	Cindy Van Hull	Pacific Lutheran Lutes	141 ft 11 in (43.25 m)
6th	Marcia Walter	Washington State Cougars	141 ft 4 1/2 in (43.09 m)

Pentathlon
Pl.	Name	Team	Mark
1st place, gold medalist(s)	Mitzi McMillin	Colorado Buffaloes	3717 pts
2nd place, silver medalist(s)	Mary Officer	Oregon Ducks	3620 pts
3rd place, bronze medalist(s)	Jeanne Suellentrop	McPherson Bulldogs	3507 pts
4th	Lori West	Colorado Buffaloes	3448 pts
5th	Marcia Kinney	Washington State Cougars	3392 pts
6th	Norma Pyle	Western Oregon Wolves	3367 pts

== See also ==
- Association for Intercollegiate Athletics for Women championships § Outdoor track and field
- 1975 NCAA Division I Outdoor Track and Field Championships
