= 1976 AIAW Outdoor Track and Field Championships =

U.S. women's athletics collegiate championship event

- Dates: May 13–15, 1976
- Host city: Manhattan, Kansas; Kansas State University
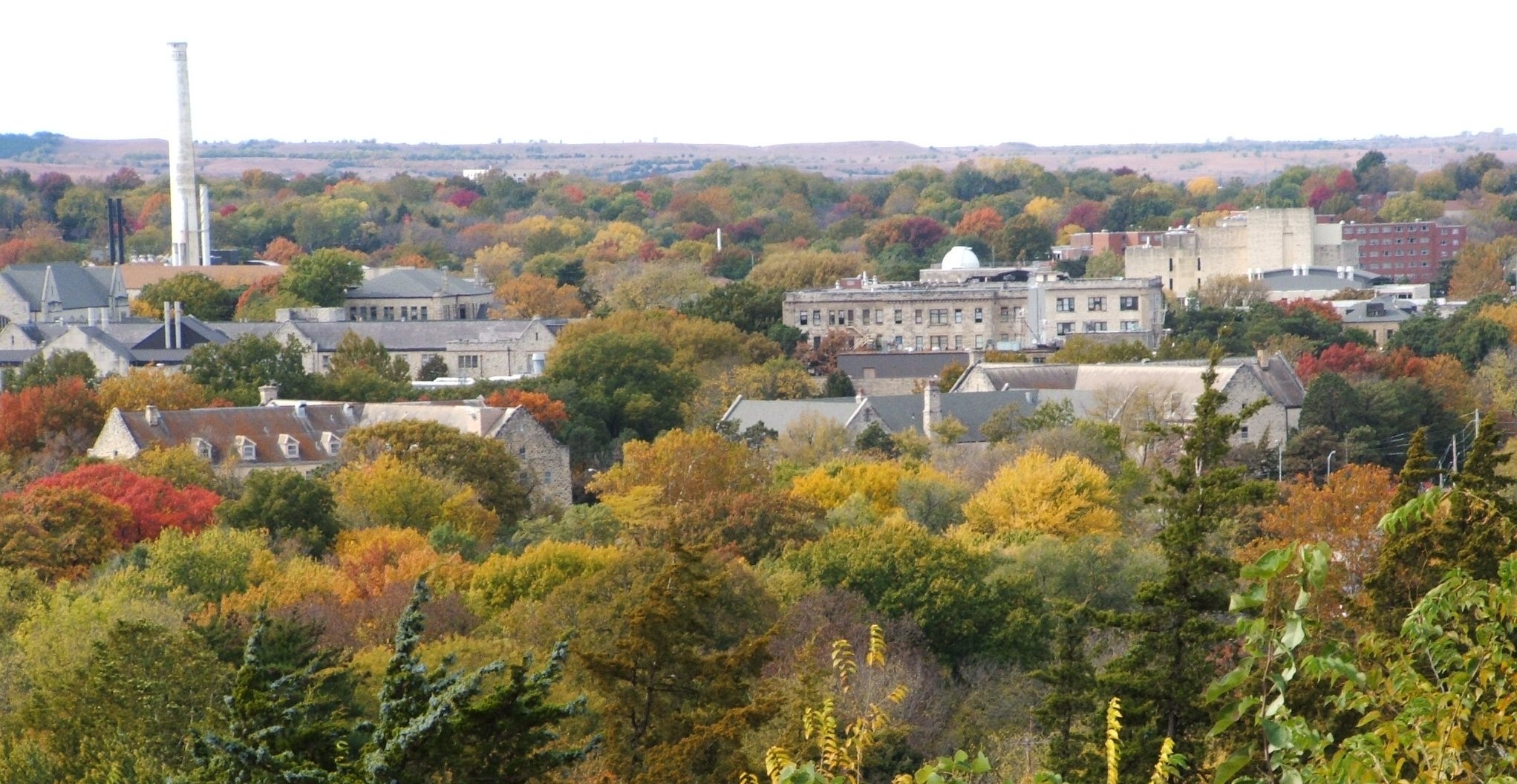

The 1976 AIAW Outdoor Track And Field Championships were the 8th annual Association for Intercollegiate Athletics for Women-sanctioned track meet to determine the individual and team national champions of women's collegiate track and field events in the United States. They were contested May 13−15, 1976 in Manhattan, Kansas by host Kansas State University. There were not separate AIAW Division I, II, and III championships for outdoor track and field until 1981.

Prairie View A&M University won the team title despite rainy weather. On the first day of competition, Peg Neppel set a world record in the 3-mile run with a 15:41.69 time.

== Team standings ==
- Scoring: 10 points for a 1st-place finish, 8 points for 2nd, 6 points for 3rd, 4 points for 4th, 2 points for 5th, and 1 point for 6th. Top 10 teams shown.

Rank	Team	Points
1st place, gold medalist(s)	Prairie View A&M Lady Panthers	60
2nd place, silver medalist(s)	Seattle Pacific Falcons	51
3rd place, bronze medalist(s)	Iowa State Cyclones	50
4th	Colorado State Rams	38
5th	Cal State Los Angeles Golden Eagles	37
6th	Kansas State Wildcats	28
7th	Texas Woman's Pioneers	21
8th	UCLA Bruins	19
9th	Florida Gators	18
10th	Penn State Nittany Lions	16

== Results ==
- Only results of finals are shown

100 m
Pl.	Name	Team	Mark
1st place, gold medalist(s)	Rosalyn Bryant	Cal State Los Angeles Golden Eagles	11.53
2nd place, silver medalist(s)	Evelyn Ashford	UCLA Bruins	11.60
3rd place, bronze medalist(s)	Rose Allwood	Florida Gators	11.61
4th	Sandra Howard	Cal State Northridge Matadors	11.62
5th	Carol Cummings	Prairie View A&M Lady Panthers	11.63
6th	Mary LeBlanc	Texas Woman's Pioneers	11.70
7th	Pam Riggs	Central Washington Wildcats	11.78
8th	Pat Blackburn	Kentucky Wildcats	11.87

200 m
Pl.	Name	Team	Mark
1st place, gold medalist(s)	Rosalyn Bryant	Cal State Los Angeles Golden Eagles	23.70
2nd place, silver medalist(s)	Pam Greene	Colorado State Rams	23.75
3rd place, bronze medalist(s)	Carol Cummings	Prairie View A&M Lady Panthers	23.89
4th	Michele McMillan	Brooklyn Bulldogs	24.15
5th	Jane Oas	Minnesota Golden Gophers	24.30
6th	Beverly Day	Prairie View A&M Lady Panthers	24.39

400 m
Pl.	Name	Team	Mark
1st place, gold medalist(s)	Shirley Williams	Prairie View A&M Lady Panthers	53.21
2nd place, silver medalist(s)	Yolanda Rich	Cal State Los Angeles Golden Eagles	54.32
3rd place, bronze medalist(s)	Arthurene Gainer	Prairie View A&M Lady Panthers	54.89
4th	Jane Oas	Minnesota Golden Gophers	54.90
5th	Beverly Day	Prairie View A&M Lady Panthers	54.99
6th	Michele McMillan	Brooklyn Bulldogs	55.78
7th	Sharon Canda	Willamette Bearcats	56.19

800 m
Pl.	Name	Team	Mark
1st place, gold medalist(s)	Wendy Knudson	Colorado State Rams	2:01.54
2nd place, silver medalist(s)	Marilyn Carlson	Central Missouri Jennies	2:06.49
3rd place, bronze medalist(s)	Liane Swegle	Seattle Redhawks	2:07.52
4th	Susan Vigil	New Mexico Lobos	2:08.99
5th	Sue Griffith	Seattle Pacific Falcons	2:09.96
6th	Swee Lee Chee	Redlands Bulldogs	2:10.07

1500 m
Pl.	Name	Team	Mark
1st place, gold medalist(s)	Wendy Knudson	Colorado State Rams	4:24.09
2nd place, silver medalist(s)	Kris Bankes	Penn State Nittany Lions	4:30.47
3rd place, bronze medalist(s)	Brenda Webb	Wright State Raiders	4:30.87
4th	Sue Kinsey	Cal State Northridge Matadors	4:31.17
5th	Joyce Urish	Kansas State Wildcats	4:32.25
6th	Cathie Twomey	Minnesota Golden Gophers	4:37.27

2 miles
Pl.	Name	Team	Mark
1st place, gold medalist(s)	Peg Neppel	Iowa State Cyclones	10:22.53
2nd place, silver medalist(s)	Teri Anderson	Kansas State Wildcats	10:32.05
3rd place, bronze medalist(s)	Kris Bankes	Penn State Nittany Lions	10:32.70
4th	Tena Anex	UC Davis Aggies	10:37.13
5th	Karen Cramond	New Mexico Lobos	10:38.15
6th	Carol Cook	Iowa State Cyclones	10:44.55

3 miles
Pl.	Name	Team	Mark
1st place, gold medalist(s)	Peg Neppel	Iowa State Cyclones	15:41.69 WR
2nd place, silver medalist(s)	Brenda Webb	Wright State Raiders	15:49.84
3rd place, bronze medalist(s)	Karen Cramond	New Mexico Lobos	16:16.7
4th	Carol Cook	Iowa State Cyclones	16:30.5
5th	Liz Berry	Penn State Nittany Lions	16:46.7
6th	Laurel Miller	Seattle Pacific Falcons	16:56.2

100 m hurdles
Pl.	Name	Team	Mark
1st place, gold medalist(s)	Carol Thomas	Delaware Fightin' Blue Hens	13.88
2nd place, silver medalist(s)	Janet Benford	Cal Poly Mustangs	14.00
3rd place, bronze medalist(s)	Mary Ayers	Prairie View A&M Lady Panthers	14.06
4th	Lorraine Tummings	Brooklyn Bulldogs	14.32
5th	Mary Officer	Oregon Ducks	14.54
6th	Debbie Esser	Iowa State Cyclones	14.65

400 m hurdles
Pl.	Name	Team	Mark
1st place, gold medalist(s)	Debbie Esser	Iowa State Cyclones	59.29
2nd place, silver medalist(s)	Denise Anderson	Seattle Pacific Falcons	1:01.99
3rd place, bronze medalist(s)	Mary Ayers	Prairie View A&M Lady Panthers	1:02.93
4th	Debbie Romsek	Bowling Green Falcons	1:03.19
5th	Georgia Evans	Texas Woman's Pioneers	1:04.49
6th	Michele Hopper	Cal State Los Angeles Golden Eagles	1:04.85

4 × 110 yards relay
Pl.	Name	Team	Mark
1st place, gold medalist(s)	Shirley Williams	Prairie View A&M Lady Panthers	46.09
1st place, gold medalist(s)	Mary Ayers	Prairie View A&M Lady Panthers	46.09
1st place, gold medalist(s)	Beverly Day	Prairie View A&M Lady Panthers	46.09
1st place, gold medalist(s)	Carol Cummings	Prairie View A&M Lady Panthers	46.09
2nd place, silver medalist(s)		Texas Woman's Pioneers	47.47
3rd place, bronze medalist(s)		Nebraska–Kearney Lopers	47.84
4th		Oregon Ducks	48.24
5th	Pat Blackburn	Kentucky Wildcats	48.46
5th	Vicki Noger	Kentucky Wildcats	48.46
5th	Tina Hill	Kentucky Wildcats	48.46
5th	Ruth Stewart	Kentucky Wildcats	48.46
6th	Bo Williams	Wisconsin Badgers	48.65
6th	Sue Tallard	Wisconsin Badgers	48.65
6th	Gilda Hudson	Wisconsin Badgers	48.65
6th	Randee Burke	Wisconsin Badgers	48.65
7th		Brooklyn Bulldogs	49.10

4 × 440 yards relay
Pl.	Name	Team	Mark
1st place, gold medalist(s)	Arthurene Gainer	Prairie View A&M Lady Panthers	3:50.77
1st place, gold medalist(s)	Beverly Day	Prairie View A&M Lady Panthers	3:50.77
1st place, gold medalist(s)	Mary Ayers	Prairie View A&M Lady Panthers	3:50.77
1st place, gold medalist(s)	Shirley Williams	Prairie View A&M Lady Panthers	3:50.77
2nd place, silver medalist(s)		Morgan State Bears	3:52.88
3rd place, bronze medalist(s)		Iowa State Cyclones	3:57.57
4th	Wendy Knudson	Colorado State Rams	4:00.15
4th	Pam Greene	Colorado State Rams	4:00.15
4th	Patricia Koehler	Colorado State Rams	4:00.15
4th	Rosie McLennon	Colorado State Rams	4:00.15
5th		Nebraska–Kearney Lopers	4:02.35
6th		Brooklyn Bulldogs	4:04.62

4 × 880 yards relay
Pl.	Name	Team	Mark
1st place, gold medalist(s)	Jane Wittmeyer	Kansas State Wildcats	9:17.85
1st place, gold medalist(s)	Teri Anderson	Kansas State Wildcats	9:17.85
1st place, gold medalist(s)	Renee Urish	Kansas State Wildcats	9:17.85
1st place, gold medalist(s)	Joyce Urish	Kansas State Wildcats	9:17.85
2nd place, silver medalist(s)		Texas Longhorns	9:23.14
3rd place, bronze medalist(s)	Wendy Knudson	Colorado State Rams	9:23.76
3rd place, bronze medalist(s)	Diane Westover	Colorado State Rams	9:23.76
3rd place, bronze medalist(s)	Patricia Koehler	Colorado State Rams	9:23.76
3rd place, bronze medalist(s)	Rosie McLennon	Colorado State Rams	9:23.76
4th	Jane Kearsley	Washington Huskies	9:26.32
4th	Alice Kelly	Washington Huskies	9:26.32
4th	Kathy Kuyk	Washington Huskies	9:26.32
4th	Jenny Reed	Washington Huskies	9:26.32
5th		Iowa State Cyclones	9:27.64
6th	Barb Bronson	Michigan State Spartans	9:33.58
6th	Diane Culp	Michigan State Spartans	9:33.58
6th	Kay Richards	Michigan State Spartans	9:33.58
6th	Lil Warnes	Michigan State Spartans	9:33.58
7th		Houston Cougars	9:41.8

High jump
Pl.	Name	Team	Mark
1st place, gold medalist(s)	Audrey Reid	Texas Woman's Pioneers	5 ft 10 in (1.77 m)
2nd place, silver medalist(s)	Pam Spencer	Seattle Pacific Falcons	5 ft 10 in (1.77 m)
3rd place, bronze medalist(s)	Marilyn Wiese	Nebraska–Kearney Lopers	5 ft 9 in (1.75 m)
4th	Marie Ribik	Pittsburgh Panthers	5 ft 7 in (1.7 m)
5th	Maureen Fitzpatrick	West Chester Golden Rams	5 ft 6 in (1.67 m)
6th	Fern Simon	Long Beach State Beach	5 ft 6 in (1.67 m)
7th	Cindy Gilbert	UCLA Bruins	5 ft 6 in (1.67 m)

Long jump
Pl.	Name	Team	Mark
1st place, gold medalist(s)	Sharon Walker	Seattle Pacific Falcons	19 ft 10 1/2 in (6.05 m)
2nd place, silver medalist(s)	Vicki Betts	Cal State Los Angeles Golden Eagles	19 ft 10 in (6.04 m)
3rd place, bronze medalist(s)	Celesia Johnson	Iowa State Cyclones	19 ft 9 3/4 in (6.03 m)
4th	Willye White	Chicago State Cougars	19 ft 6 3/4 in (5.96 m)
5th	Lorraine Ray	Miami Dade Sharks	19 ft 6 in (5.94 m)
6th	Mary Ayers	Prairie View A&M Lady Panthers	19 ft 5 1/4 in (5.92 m)
7th	Diane Kummer	UCLA Bruins	19 ft 1 3/4 in (5.83 m)
8th	Gwen Bilslend	Nebraska–Kearney Lopers	19 ft 0 1/4 in (5.79 m)

Shot put
Pl.	Name	Team	Mark
1st place, gold medalist(s)	Kathy Devine	Emporia State Hornets	53 ft 1 in (16.17 m)
2nd place, silver medalist(s)	Marcia Mecklenburg	Seattle Pacific Falcons	51 ft 5 in (15.67 m)
3rd place, bronze medalist(s)	Evelyn Okeke	Western Oregon Wolves	46 ft 9 in (14.24 m)
4th	Suzie Snider	Baylor Bears	45 ft 11 1/2 in (14 m)
5th	Karen Marshall	Oregon Ducks	45 ft 1 in (13.74 m)
6th	Pam Porter	South Dakota State Jackrabbits	44 ft 11 1/2 in (13.7 m)

Discus throw
Pl.	Name	Team	Mark
1st place, gold medalist(s)	Lorna Griffin	Flathead Valley Mountainettes	154 ft 7 3/4 in (47.13 m)
2nd place, silver medalist(s)	Marcia Mecklenburg	Seattle Pacific Falcons	154 ft 7 in (47.11 m)
3rd place, bronze medalist(s)	Linda Montgomery	Texas State Bobcats	152 ft 9 1/4 in (46.56 m)
4th	Debbie Stephens	McPherson Bulldogs	145 ft 7 in (44.37 m)
5th	Jackie Gordon	Florida State Seminoles	141 ft 3 1/2 in (43.06 m)
6th	Lisa Vogelsang	UCLA Bruins	140 ft 9 in (42.9 m)

Javelin throw
Pl.	Name	Team	Mark
1st place, gold medalist(s)	Karin Smith	UCLA Bruins	161 ft 6 in (49.22 m)
2nd place, silver medalist(s)	Marsha Poppe	Kansas State Wildcats	139 ft 1 in (42.39 m)
3rd place, bronze medalist(s)	Sonja Bennett	Seattle Pacific Falcons	135 ft 9 1/2 in (41.38 m)
4th	Marsha Melvin	Western Oregon Wolves	135 ft 7 in (41.32 m)
5th	Monica Stoltenburg	Portland State Vikings	132 ft 2 in (40.28 m)
6th	Merri Anne Furlong	Montana Lady Griz	129 ft 11 in (39.59 m)

Pentathlon
Pl.	Name	Team	Mark
1st place, gold medalist(s)	Heidi Hertz	Florida Gators	3805 pts
2nd place, silver medalist(s)	Laura Blank	Milwaukee Panthers	3763 pts
3rd place, bronze medalist(s)	Lori West	Colorado Buffaloes	3744 pts
4th	Linda Cornelius	UNLV Rebels	3644 pts
5th	Norma Pyle	Western Oregon Wolves	3588 pts
6th	Janet Lynch	Vermont Catamounts	3565 pts

== See also ==
- Association for Intercollegiate Athletics for Women championships § Outdoor track and field
- 1976 NCAA Division I Outdoor Track and Field Championships
