= 1974 AIAW Outdoor Track and Field Championships =

U.S. women's athletics collegiate championship event

- Dates: May 17–18, 1974
- Host city: Denton, Texas; Texas Woman's University
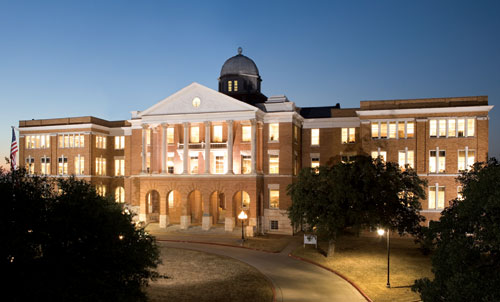

The 1974 AIAW Outdoor Track And Field Championships were the 6th annual Association for Intercollegiate Athletics for Women-sanctioned track meet to determine the individual and team national champions of women's collegiate track and field events in the United States. They were contested May 17−18, 1974 in Denton, Texas by host Texas Woman's University. There were not separate AIAW Division I, II, and III championships for outdoor track and field until 1981.

84 schools participated. Prairie View A&M University, which was said to have a well-rounded team, won over the University of California Los Angeles which relied on distance running strength. Jamaica's Andrea Bruce competed in four events and won three of them for Prairie View, while Francie Larrieu won the half-mile, mile, and 2-mile runs and ran on UCLA's relay team.

== Team standings ==
- Scoring: 10 points for a 1st-place finish, 8 points for 2nd, 6 points for 3rd, 4 points for 4th, 2 points for 5th, and 1 point for 6th. Top 10 teams shown.

Rank	Team	Points
1st place, gold medalist(s)	Prairie View A&M Lady Panthers	85
2nd place, silver medalist(s)	UCLA Bruins	68
3rd place, bronze medalist(s)	Texas Woman's Pioneers	49
4th	Cal State Los Angeles Golden Eagles	37
5th	Chicago State Cougars	28
6th	Iowa State Cyclones	26
7th	Seattle Pacific Falcons	23
8th	Colorado State Rams	21
9th	Kansas State Wildcats	20
10th	Flathead Valley Mountainettes	18

== Results ==
- Only results of finals are shown

100 yards (+9.25 mph (4.14 m/s))
Pl.	Name	Team	Mark
1st place, gold medalist(s)	Rochelle Davis	Texas Woman's Pioneers	10.4 w
2nd place, silver medalist(s)	Janet Brown	Texas Woman's Pioneers	10.5 w
3rd place, bronze medalist(s)	Rosalyn Bryant	Chicago State Cougars	10.6 w
4th	Pam Greene	Colorado State Rams	10.7 w
5th	Audrey Reid	Texas Woman's Pioneers	10.8 w
6th	Cathy Newman	Iowa State Cyclones	10.9 w
7th	Pam Jones	Cal State Los Angeles Golden Eagles	11.1 w
8th	Marjorie Grimmett	Michigan State Spartans	12.8 w

220 yards (Note: Audrey Reid also qualified for the finals.) (+10.18 mph (4.55 m/s))
Pl.	Name	Team	Mark
1st place, gold medalist(s)	Rosalyn Bryant	Chicago State Cougars	24.3 w
2nd place, silver medalist(s)	Pam Greene	Colorado State Rams	24.7 w
3rd place, bronze medalist(s)	Janet Brown	Texas Woman's Pioneers	24.8 w
4th	Marjorie Grimmett	Michigan State Spartans	25.3 w
5th	Christel Brown	Graceland Yellowjackets	25.5 w
6th	Charlotte Walker	Rutgers Scarlet Knights	25.6 w
7th	Laura Blank	Milwaukee Panthers	26.8 w

440 yards (Note: Mary McGroarty of the Florida Gators also qualified for the finals.)
Pl.	Name	Team	Mark
1st place, gold medalist(s)	Debra Sapenter	Prairie View A&M Lady Panthers	53.8
2nd place, silver medalist(s)	Jarvis Scott	Cal State Los Angeles Golden Eagles	55.2
3rd place, bronze medalist(s)	Tecla Chemabwai	Chicago State Cougars	55.8
4th	Jane Oas	Minnesota Golden Gophers	57.6
5th	Mindy Harwood	Montana Lady Griz	57.9
6th	Charlyce Remington	Nebraska–Kearney Lopers	58.1
7th	Mary Wallace	Prairie View A&M Lady Panthers	58.3

880 yards (Note: Tecla Chemabwai qualified for the finals but scratched.)
Pl.	Name	Team	Mark
1st place, gold medalist(s)	Francie Larrieu	UCLA Bruins	2:10.5
2nd place, silver medalist(s)	Wendy Knudson	Colorado State Rams	2:11.9
3rd place, bronze medalist(s)	Julie Brown	UCLA Bruins	2:11.9
4th	Liane Swegle	Seattle Redhawks	2:12.4
5th	Marilyn Carlson	Central Missouri Jennies	2:15.0
6th	Carolyn Court	Southern Connecticut Owls	2:15.5
7th	Sherry Sessions	North Texas Mean Green	2:17.3
8th	Laurie Meyers	Western Illinois Leathernecks	2:18.0
9th	Elizabeth Johnson	Centre Colonels	2:19.0
10th	Titilayo Adeleke	Morgan State Bears	2:21.7
11th	Nancy Severance	Cal State East Bay Pioneers	2:29.7

Mile run
Pl.	Name	Team	Mark
1st place, gold medalist(s)	Francie Larrieu	UCLA Bruins	4:59.4
2nd place, silver medalist(s)	Julie Brown	UCLA Bruins	4:59.4
3rd place, bronze medalist(s)	Kathy McIntyre	Seattle Pacific Falcons	5:00.6
4th	Peggy Neppel	Iowa State Cyclones	5:00.7
5th	Clare Choate	UCLA Bruins	5:00.8
6th	Maryl Barker	Oregon Ducks	5:02.8
7th	Eileen Claugus	UC Davis Aggies	5:04.6
8th	Kathy Kuyk	Washington Huskies	5:08.7
9th	Sue Mallery	Ohio State Buckeyes	5:08.8
10th	Kim Piper	Parkside Rangers	5:10.9
11th	Carol Cook	Missouri State Lady Bears	5:12.3
12th	Robin Evans	Iowa State Cyclones	5:17.9

2 miles (Note: 26 runners were entered in the finals according to Women's Track World, but only the top six finishers are known.)
Pl.	Name	Team	Mark
1st place, gold medalist(s)	Francie Larrieu	UCLA Bruins	10:56.6
2nd place, silver medalist(s)	Julie Brown	UCLA Bruins	10:57.1
3rd place, bronze medalist(s)	Clare Choate	UCLA Bruins	10:59.6
4th	Peggy Neppel	Iowa State Cyclones	11:01.8
5th	Kathy Kuyk	Washington Huskies	11:09.2
6th	Kathy McIntyre	Seattle Pacific Falcons	11:09.9

100 m hurdles (+11.66 mph (5.21 m/s))
Pl.	Name	Team	Mark
1st place, gold medalist(s)	Andrea Bruce	Prairie View A&M Lady Panthers	13.9
2nd place, silver medalist(s)	Mary Ayers	Prairie View A&M Lady Panthers	14.6
3rd place, bronze medalist(s)	Janet Benford	Cal Poly Mustangs	14.7
4th	Marilyn Carlson	Central Missouri Jennies	14.8
5th	Teri Wheeler	Flathead Valley Mountainettes	14.9
6th	Cam Conly	South Dakota State Jackrabbits	14.9
7th	Mary Officer	Oregon Ducks	14.9
8th	Kathy Welter	Nebraska–Kearney Lopers	14.9

400 m hurdles (Note: Ann Kimm of the Northwest Missouri State Bearcats also qualified for the finals.)
Pl.	Name	Team	Mark
1st place, gold medalist(s)	Mary Ayers	Prairie View A&M Lady Panthers	61.1
2nd place, silver medalist(s)	Andrea Bruce	Prairie View A&M Lady Panthers	61.1
3rd place, bronze medalist(s)	Michele Hopper	Cal State Los Angeles Golden Eagles	61.2
4th	Marilyn Linsenmeyer	Oklahoma State Cowgirls	61.9
5th	Janet Reusser	Kansas State Wildcats	62.8
6th	Leslie Clark	UC Davis Aggies	63.3
7th	Mary Ellen Spruce	Northern Colorado Bears	65.7

4 × 110 yards relay
Pl.	Name	Team	Mark
1st place, gold medalist(s)	Janet Brown	Texas Woman's Pioneers 'X'	46.5
1st place, gold medalist(s)	Rochelle Davis	Texas Woman's Pioneers 'X'	46.5
1st place, gold medalist(s)	Sandra Souza	Texas Woman's Pioneers 'X'	46.5
1st place, gold medalist(s)	Audrey Reid	Texas Woman's Pioneers 'X'	46.5
2nd place, silver medalist(s)	Charlene Branch	Prairie View A&M Lady Panthers	47.2
2nd place, silver medalist(s)	Debra Sapenter	Prairie View A&M Lady Panthers	47.2
2nd place, silver medalist(s)	Mary Wallace	Prairie View A&M Lady Panthers	47.2
2nd place, silver medalist(s)	Geraldine Taylor	Prairie View A&M Lady Panthers	47.2
3rd place, bronze medalist(s)	Wanda Norris	Flathead Valley Mountainettes	48.5
3rd place, bronze medalist(s)	Carol Wiprud	Flathead Valley Mountainettes	48.5
3rd place, bronze medalist(s)	Joann Westermeyer	Flathead Valley Mountainettes	48.5
3rd place, bronze medalist(s)	Debbie Hileman	Flathead Valley Mountainettes	48.5
4th	Connie Pease	Iowa State Cyclones	48.6
4th	Deb Ward	Iowa State Cyclones	48.6
4th	Sherry Edwards	Iowa State Cyclones	48.6
4th	Cathy Newman	Iowa State Cyclones	48.6
5th	Bonnie Albrecht	Chico State Wildcats	48.7
5th	Venita Walter	Chico State Wildcats	48.7
5th	Michelle DeVol	Chico State Wildcats	48.7
5th	Renda Cary	Chico State Wildcats	48.7
6th	Doris Thomas	Texas Woman's Pioneers 'Y'	49.3
6th	Susan Gorthey	Texas Woman's Pioneers 'Y'	49.3
6th	Dana Hight	Texas Woman's Pioneers 'Y'	49.3
6th	Lucia Vaamonde	Texas Woman's Pioneers 'Y'	49.3
7th	Margot Tiff	Cal State Los Angeles Golden Eagles	49.9
7th	Vicki Betts	Cal State Los Angeles Golden Eagles	49.9
7th	Jarvis Scott	Cal State Los Angeles Golden Eagles	49.9
7th	Michele Hopper	Cal State Los Angeles Golden Eagles	49.9

Sprint medley relay (Note: Held at a total distance of 880 yards, with the first leg running 220 yards, the middle two legs running 110 yards, and the anchor leg running 440 yards.)
Pl.	Name	Team	Mark
1st place, gold medalist(s)	Mary Wallace	Prairie View A&M Lady Panthers	1:42.3
1st place, gold medalist(s)	Charlene Branch	Prairie View A&M Lady Panthers	1:42.3
1st place, gold medalist(s)	Debra Sapenter	Prairie View A&M Lady Panthers	1:42.3
1st place, gold medalist(s)	Geraldine Taylor	Prairie View A&M Lady Panthers	1:42.3
2nd place, silver medalist(s)	Michele Hopper	Cal State Los Angeles Golden Eagles	1:44.8
2nd place, silver medalist(s)	Margot Tiff	Cal State Los Angeles Golden Eagles	1:44.8
2nd place, silver medalist(s)	Vicki Betts	Cal State Los Angeles Golden Eagles	1:44.8
2nd place, silver medalist(s)	Jarvis Scott	Cal State Los Angeles Golden Eagles	1:44.8
3rd place, bronze medalist(s)	Janet Brown	Texas Woman's Pioneers 'X'	1:46.1
3rd place, bronze medalist(s)	Rochelle Davis	Texas Woman's Pioneers 'X'	1:46.1
3rd place, bronze medalist(s)	Audrey Reid	Texas Woman's Pioneers 'X'	1:46.1
3rd place, bronze medalist(s)	Susan Gorthey	Texas Woman's Pioneers 'X'	1:46.1
4th	Rosalyn Bryant	Chicago State Cougars	1:46.6
4th	Cheryl Condon	Chicago State Cougars	1:46.6
4th	Veronica Harris	Chicago State Cougars	1:46.6
4th	Tecla Chemabwai	Chicago State Cougars	1:46.6
5th	Pam Eidson	Texas Woman's Pioneers 'Y'	1:47.8
5th	Lucia Vaamonde	Texas Woman's Pioneers 'Y'	1:47.8
5th	Sandra Souza	Texas Woman's Pioneers 'Y'	1:47.8
5th	Cathy Sellers	Texas Woman's Pioneers 'Y'	1:47.8
6th	Peggy Russ	Colorado State Rams	1:52.4
6th	Carmen Tribble	Colorado State Rams	1:52.4
6th	Patricia Koehler	Colorado State Rams	1:52.4
6th	Pam Greene	Colorado State Rams	1:52.4
	Debbie Hileman	Flathead Valley Mountainettes	DQ
	Wanda Norris	Flathead Valley Mountainettes	DQ
	Carol Wiprud	Flathead Valley Mountainettes	DQ
	Terri Wheeler	Flathead Valley Mountainettes	DQ

4 × 440 yards relay
Pl.	Name	Team	Mark
1st place, gold medalist(s)	Cathy Newman	Iowa State Cyclones	3:55.5
1st place, gold medalist(s)	Sherry Edwards	Iowa State Cyclones	3:55.5
1st place, gold medalist(s)	Deb Ward	Iowa State Cyclones	3:55.5
1st place, gold medalist(s)	Elaine McAlexander	Iowa State Cyclones	3:55.5
2nd place, silver medalist(s)	Francie Larrieu	UCLA Bruins	3:58.0
2nd place, silver medalist(s)	Julie Brown	UCLA Bruins	3:58.0
2nd place, silver medalist(s)	Dale Raymond	UCLA Bruins	3:58.0
2nd place, silver medalist(s)	Laurie Huggard	UCLA Bruins	3:58.0
3rd place, bronze medalist(s)	Karen Brinker	Kansas State Wildcats	3:58.6
3rd place, bronze medalist(s)	Barb Eakin	Kansas State Wildcats	3:58.6
3rd place, bronze medalist(s)	Janet Reusser	Kansas State Wildcats	3:58.6
3rd place, bronze medalist(s)	Peggy Johns	Kansas State Wildcats	3:58.6
4th	Peggy Russ	Colorado State Rams	4:01.1
4th	Patricia Koehler	Colorado State Rams	4:01.1
4th	Helen Adams	Colorado State Rams	4:01.1
4th	Linda Anderson	Colorado State Rams	4:01.1
5th	Jane Kearsley	Washington Huskies	4:01.6
5th	Laurie Wiegardt	Washington Huskies	4:01.6
5th	Kathy Kuyk	Washington Huskies	4:01.6
5th	Lisa Johnson	Washington Huskies	4:01.6
6th	Laura Van Harn	California Golden Bears	4:02.6
6th	Marilyn Neufville	California Golden Bears	4:02.6
6th	Joanne Silverman	California Golden Bears	4:02.6
6th	Lee Wilder	California Golden Bears	4:02.6
7th	Lesley Smith	Florida Gators	4:03.8
7th	Kristi Stovall	Florida Gators	4:03.8
7th	Paula Hegarty	Florida Gators	4:03.8
7th	Mary McGroarty	Florida Gators	4:03.8

High jump
Pl.	Name	Team	Mark
1st place, gold medalist(s)	Andrea Bruce	Prairie View A&M Lady Panthers	6 ft 0 in (1.82 m)
2nd place, silver medalist(s)	Karen Moller	Temple Owls	5 ft 8 in (1.72 m)
3rd place, bronze medalist(s)	Lesli Hamilton	BYU Cougars	5 ft 6 in (1.67 m)
4th	Cheryl Friesen	Tabor Bluejays	5 ft 6 in (1.67 m)
5th	Suzie Snider	Baylor Bears	5 ft 6 in (1.67 m)
6th	Cam Conly	South Dakota State Jackrabbits	5 ft 5 in (1.65 m)

Long jump
Pl.	Name	Team	Mark
1st place, gold medalist(s)	Andrea Bruce	Prairie View A&M Lady Panthers	19 ft 5 1/4 in (5.92 m) w
2nd place, silver medalist(s)	Vicki Betts	Cal State Los Angeles Golden Eagles	18 ft 8 in (5.68 m) w
3rd place, bronze medalist(s)	Cathy Newman	Iowa State Cyclones	18 ft 7 in (5.66 m) w
4th	Christel Brown	Graceland Yellowjackets	19 ft 0 in (5.79 m) w
5th	Cathy Cooper	Illinois State Redbirds	18 ft 3 in (5.56 m) w
6th	Laurel Vietzke	Michigan State Spartans	18 ft 6 1/2 in (5.65 m) w
7th	Sue Von Behren	Parkside Rangers	18 ft 3 in (5.56 m) w

Shot put
Pl.	Name	Team	Mark
1st place, gold medalist(s)	Lynette Matthews	Seattle Pacific Falcons	46 ft 9 in (14.24 m)
2nd place, silver medalist(s)	Mary Jacobson	Kansas Jayhawks	45 ft 4 in (13.81 m)
3rd place, bronze medalist(s)	Iva Wright	Fresno State Bulldogs	44 ft 8 1/4 in (13.62 m)
4th	Suzie Snider	Baylor Bears	43 ft 10 1/2 in (13.37 m)
5th	Waynette Mitchell	Hawaii Rainbow Wahine	41 ft 10 1/2 in (12.76 m)
6th	Kathy Trout	Nebraska–Kearney Lopers	40 ft 11 in (12.47 m)
7th	Kathy Bryant	Western Oregon Wolves	40 ft 7 1/2 in (12.38 m)

Discus throw
Pl.	Name	Team	Mark
1st place, gold medalist(s)	Iva Wright	Fresno State Bulldogs	147 ft 7 in (44.98 m)
2nd place, silver medalist(s)	Suzie Snider	Baylor Bears	144 ft 2 in (43.94 m)
3rd place, bronze medalist(s)	Lynette Matthews	Seattle Pacific Falcons	143 ft 6 in (43.73 m)
4th	Waynette Mitchell	Hawaii Rainbow Wahine	141 ft 8 in (43.18 m)
5th	Mary Petree	Central Washington Wildcats	135 ft 10 in (41.4 m)
6th	Lori Lyford	Flathead Valley Mountainettes	135 ft 11 in (41.42 m)
7th	Lesley Winbigler	Oregon Ducks	127 ft 2 in (38.76 m)

Javelin throw
Pl.	Name	Team	Mark
1st place, gold medalist(s)	Barbara Pickel	Cal State East Bay Pioneers	155 ft 7 in (47.42 m)
2nd place, silver medalist(s)	Susie Norton	Kansas State Wildcats	156 ft 6 in (47.7 m)
3rd place, bronze medalist(s)	Diane Spangler	Cal State Los Angeles Golden Eagles	146 ft 8 in (44.7 m)
4th	Marsha Poppe	Kansas State Wildcats	146 ft 2 in (44.55 m)
5th	Vicki Hallman	South Dakota State Jackrabbits	144 ft 0 in (43.89 m)
6th	Bonnie Thomas	Flathead Valley Mountainettes	129 ft 7 in (39.49 m)
7th	Janesa Calabrese	Illinois Fighting Illini	126 ft 9 in (38.63 m)

Pentathlon
Pl.	Name	Team	Mark
1st place, gold medalist(s)	Debbie Wilson	Illinois State Redbirds	3257 pts
2nd place, silver medalist(s)	Linda Jonckowski	Flathead Valley Mountainettes	3168 pts
3rd place, bronze medalist(s)	Mary Hale	Washington State Cougars	3158 pts
4th	Michelle Willis	Grambling State Tigers	3106 pts
5th	Cheryl Nichols	Texas Woman's Pioneers	3107 pts
6th	Sue McMahon	Dawson Buccaneers	2936 pts
7th	Lynn McNamee	Missouri State Lady Bears	2934 pts

== See also ==
- Association for Intercollegiate Athletics for Women championships § Outdoor track and field
- 1974 NCAA Division I Outdoor Track and Field Championships
