= Athletics at the 1979 Summer Universiade – Women's pentathlon =

The women's pentathlon event at the 1979 Summer Universiade was held at the Estadio Olimpico Universitario in Mexico City on 8 and 9 September 1979. It was the last time that this event was held at the Universiade before being replaced by the heptathlon.

== Results ==
The highest mark recorded in each event is highlighted in yellow

Rank	Athlete	Nationality	100m H	SP	HJ	LJ	800m	Result	Notes
1st place, gold medalist(s)	Yekaterina Smirnova	Soviet Union	13.18	13.59	1.84	6.23	2:29.09	4497	
2nd place, silver medalist(s)	Sylvia Barlag	Netherlands	14.04	12.87	1.77	6.17	2:25.05	4306	
3rd place, bronze medalist(s)	Ina Losch	West Germany	14.46	12.56	1.77	5.96	2:18.45	4272	
4	Yvette Wray	Great Britain	13.50	12.35	1.65	5.92	2:18.95	4248	
5	Olga Kuragina	Soviet Union	13.79	11.62	1.71	5.92	2:17.74	4239	
6	Els Stolk	Netherlands	14.27	12.18	1.74	5.84	2:26.09	4123	
7	Anna Włodarczyk	Poland	14.00	9.55	1.71	6.44	2:25.47	4093	
8	Anne-Marie Pira	Belgium	13.50	9.83	1.84	5.92	2:45.35	3984	
9	Joanne Jones	Canada						3928	
10	Karen Page	New Zealand						3904	
11	Jill Ross	Canada						3622	
12	Evelyn Jabiles	Peru						3381	
13	Lorenza Orendaín	Mexico						2782	
14	Amapola Arimany	Guatemala						2642	
	Gabriela Ionescu	Romania						DNF	
