= Colorado State Rams track and field =

American college track and field team

- University: Colorado State University
- Head coach: Brian Bedard
- Conference: Pac-12
- Location: Fort Collins, Colorado
- Outdoor track: Jack Christiansen Track Facility
- Nickname: Rams
- Colors: Green and gold

The Colorado State Rams track and field team is the track and field program that represents Colorado State University. The Rams compete in NCAA Division I as a member of the Pac-12 Conference. The team is based in Fort Collins, Colorado, at the Jack Christiansen Track Facility.

The program is coached by Brian Bedard. The track and field program officially encompasses four teams because the NCAA considers men's and women's indoor track and field and outdoor track and field as separate sports.

In 2001, runner Bryan Berryhill became the school's first two-time individual NCAA champion. Berryhill won both the mile at the 2001 NCAA Division I Indoor Track and Field Championships and 1500 m at the 2001 NCAA Division I Outdoor Track and Field Championships, doing the latter by utilizing a fast start.

== Postseason ==
=== AIAW ===
The Rams have had 17 AIAW All-Americans finishing in the top six at the AIAW indoor or outdoor championships.

AIAW All-Americans
Championships	Name	Event	Place
1970 Outdoor	Barbara Lawson	880 yards	3rd
1970 Outdoor	Barbara Lawson	Mile run	1st
1974 Outdoor	Pam Greene	100 yards	4th
1974 Outdoor	Pam Greene	220 yards	2nd
1974 Outdoor	Wendy Knudson	880 yards	2nd
1974 Outdoor	Wendy Knudson	880 yards	2nd
1974 Outdoor	Peggy Russ	Sprint medley relay	6th
1974 Outdoor	Carmen Tribble	Sprint medley relay	6th
1974 Outdoor	Patricia Koehler	Sprint medley relay	6th
1974 Outdoor	Pam Greene	Sprint medley relay	6th
1974 Outdoor	Peggy Russ	4 × 440 yards relay	4th
1974 Outdoor	Patricia Koehler	4 × 440 yards relay	4th
1974 Outdoor	Helen Adams	4 × 440 yards relay	4th
1974 Outdoor	Linda Anderson	4 × 440 yards relay	4th
1975 Outdoor	Pam Greene	220 yards	2nd
1975 Outdoor	Wendy Knudson	880 yards	1st
1975 Outdoor	Jeri Bonnell	400 meters hurdles	6th
1975 Outdoor	Wendy Knudson	4 × 400 meters relay	2nd
1975 Outdoor	Pam Greene	4 × 400 meters relay	2nd
1975 Outdoor	Patricia Koehler	4 × 400 meters relay	2nd
1975 Outdoor	Jeri Bonnell	4 × 400 meters relay	2nd
1976 Outdoor	Pam Greene	200 meters	2nd
1976 Outdoor	Wendy Knudson	800 meters	1st
1976 Outdoor	Wendy Knudson	1500 meters	1st
1976 Outdoor	Wendy Knudson	4 × 440 yards relay	4th
1976 Outdoor	Pam Greene	4 × 440 yards relay	4th
1976 Outdoor	Patricia Koehler	4 × 440 yards relay	4th
1976 Outdoor	Rosie McLennon	4 × 440 yards relay	4th
1976 Outdoor	Wendy Knudson	4 × 880 yards relay	3rd
1976 Outdoor	Diane Westover	4 × 880 yards relay	3rd
1976 Outdoor	Patricia Koehler	4 × 880 yards relay	3rd
1976 Outdoor	Rosie McLennon	4 × 880 yards relay	3rd
1977 Outdoor	Wendy Knudson	800 meters	2nd
1977 Outdoor	Nancy Malloy	Pentathlon	6th
1978 Indoor	Sally Rand	880 yards	4th
1978 Indoor	Mary Anne Harrington	High jump	5th
1978 Indoor	Mary Anne Harrington	Long jump	1st
1978 Indoor	Brenda Wilson	Long jump	5th
1979 Indoor	Mary Anne Harrington	Pentathlon	3rd
1979 Outdoor	Amy Lafoon	10,000 meters	3rd
1982 Outdoor	Konnie Mackey	400 meters hurdles	5th

=== NCAA ===
As of August 2025, a total of 31 men and 21 women have achieved individual first-team All-American status for the team at the Division I men's outdoor, women's outdoor, men's indoor, or women's indoor national championships (using the modern criteria of top-8 placing regardless of athlete nationality).

First team NCAA All-Americans
Team	Championships	Name	Event	Place	Ref.
Men's	1929 Outdoor	Dan Beattie	Discus throw	5th	
Men's	1929 Outdoor	Dan Beattie	Hammer throw	4th	
Men's	1931 Outdoor	Ivan Dykeman	Hammer throw	1st	
Men's	1933 Outdoor	Forrest Harvey	3000 meters	3rd	
Men's	1933 Outdoor	Chester Cruikshank	Hammer throw	2nd	
Men's	1934 Outdoor	Chester Cruikshank	Discus throw	6th	
Men's	1934 Outdoor	Chester Cruikshank	Hammer throw	4th	
Men's	1935 Outdoor	Forrest Harvey	3000 meters	7th	
Men's	1935 Outdoor	Chester Cruikshank	Discus throw	7th	
Men's	1935 Outdoor	Chester Cruikshank	Hammer throw	2nd	
Men's	1949 Outdoor	Thurman McGraw	Discus throw	8th	
Men's	1952 Outdoor	Alex Burl	100 meters	7th	
Men's	1952 Outdoor	Gorden Riddell	Pole vault	1st	
Men's	1953 Outdoor	Gordon Riddell	Pole vault	5th	
Men's	1954 Outdoor	Alex Burl	100 meters	6th	
Men's	1954 Outdoor	Alex Burl	200 meters	5th	
Men's	1968 Outdoor	Dan Columbus	200 meters	6th	
Men's	1968 Outdoor	Tarry Harrison	10,000 meters	2nd	
Men's	1973 Outdoor	Chris Adsit	400 meters hurdles	5th	
Men's	1974 Outdoor	Marshall Smith	Discus throw	3rd	
Men's	1975 Outdoor	Bobby Grubbs	10,000 meters	8th	
Men's	1975 Outdoor	Marshall Smith	Discus throw	2nd	
Men's	1979 Indoor	Jon Sinclair	Mile run	5th	
Men's	1979 Outdoor	Richie Harris	1500 meters	7th	
Men's	1979 Outdoor	Jon Sinclair	5000 meters	7th	
Men's	1979 Outdoor	Mike Duffala	Hammer throw	8th	
Men's	1980 Outdoor	Richie Harris	1500 meters	3rd	
Men's	1983 Outdoor	Chuck Degarmo	5000 meters	6th	
Women's	1988 Indoor	Elizabeth Johnson	3000 meters	8th	
Women's	1992 Outdoor	Sandy Ham	5000 meters	2nd	
Women's	1995 Outdoor	Shelly Greathouse	Discus throw	8th	
Men's	1996 Indoor	Dave Sobolik	Mile run	6th	
Men's	1996 Outdoor	Casey Malone	Discus throw	5th	
Women's	1996 Outdoor	Shelly Greathouse	Discus throw	5th	
Men's	1998 Indoor	Bryan Berryhill	Mile run	2nd	
Women's	1998 Indoor	Grettel Miller	Weight throw	8th	
Men's	1998 Outdoor	Bryan Berryhill	1500 meters	3rd	
Men's	1998 Outdoor	Casey Malone	Discus throw	1st	
Women's	1998 Outdoor	Shelly Borrman	Discus throw	3rd	
Women's	1998 Outdoor	Shelly Borman	Hammer throw	6th	
Men's	1999 Indoor	Bryan Berryhill	Mile run	2nd	
Men's	1999 Outdoor	Bryan Berryhill	1500 meters	3rd	
Women's	1999 Outdoor	Shelly Borrman	Discus throw	2nd	
Men's	2000 Outdoor	Bryan Berryhill	1500 meters	3rd	
Men's	2000 Outdoor	Casey Malone	Discus throw	5th	
Women's	2000 Outdoor	Liz Toman	Discus throw	6th	
Men's	2001 Indoor	Bryan Berryhill	Mile run	1st	
Women's	2001 Indoor	Liz Toman	Shot put	4th	
Men's	2001 Outdoor	Bryan Berryhill	1500 meters	1st	
Women's	2001 Outdoor	Liz Toman	Discus throw	2nd	
Men's	2002 Indoor	Drew Loftin	Weight throw	7th	
Women's	2002 Indoor	Katie Yemm	Mile run	7th	
Men's	2003 Indoor	Drew Loftin	Weight throw	2nd	
Women's	2003 Indoor	Loree Smith	Weight throw	8th	
Men's	2003 Outdoor	Drew Loftin	Discus throw	7th	
Men's	2003 Outdoor	Drew Loftin	Hammer throw	2nd	
Men's	2004 Indoor	John Woods	60 meters	6th	
Men's	2004 Outdoor	John Woods	200 meters	8th	
Women's	2004 Outdoor	Loree Smith	Hammer throw	6th	
Men's	2005 Indoor	Magnus Lohse	Shot put	4th	
Women's	2005 Indoor	Loree Smith	Shot put	8th	
Women's	2005 Indoor	Loree Smith	Weight throw	2nd	
Men's	2005 Outdoor	Adam Trainor	Hammer throw	8th	
Women's	2005 Outdoor	Katie Hansen	Discus throw	8th	
Women's	2005 Outdoor	Loree Smith	Hammer throw	1st	
Women's	2007 Indoor	Janay Soukup	Long jump	5th	
Women's	2007 Indoor	Katie Lloyd	Pentathlon	7th	
Men's	2007 Outdoor	Jason Schutz	Discus throw	8th	
Women's	2007 Outdoor	Janay Soukup	Long jump	6th	
Men's	2008 Outdoor	Jason Schutz	Discus throw	6th	
Women's	2008 Outdoor	Janay Soukup	Long jump	6th	
Women's	2010 Outdoor	Kristen Hemphill	3000 meters steeplechase	7th	
Men's	2013 Outdoor	Trevor Brown	110 meters hurdles	8th	
Men's	2014 Outdoor	Trevor Brown	400 meters hurdles	8th	
Women's	2014 Outdoor	Kiah Hicks	Discus throw	7th	
Men's	2016 Indoor	Jefferson Abbey	3000 meters	6th	
Men's	2016 Indoor	Mostafa Amr Hassan	Shot put	5th	
Men's	2016 Outdoor	Mostafa Amr Hassan	Shot put	3rd	
Men's	2017 Indoor	Cole Rockhold	3000 meters	6th	
Men's	2017 Indoor	Mostafa Amr Hassan	Shot put	1st	
Men's	2017 Indoor	Hunter Price	Heptathlon	4th	
Men's	2017 Outdoor	Mostafa Amr Hassan	Shot put	2nd	
Men's	2018 Indoor	Cole Rockhold	Mile run	6th	
Men's	2018 Indoor	Mostafa Amr Hassan	Shot put	1st	
Men's	2018 Outdoor	Mostafa Amr Hassan	Shot put	3rd	
Women's	2019 Outdoor	Shadae Lawrence	Discus throw	3rd	
Men's	2021 Indoor	Eric Hamer	5000 meters	2nd	
Men's	2021 Outdoor	Eric Hamer	10,000 meters	5th	
Women's	2022 Indoor	Lauren Gale	400 meters	8th	
Women's	2022 Indoor	Lexie Keller	Pentathlon	3rd	
Women's	2022 Outdoor	Lexie Keller	Heptathlon	6th	
Women's	2023 Outdoor	Gabi Morris	Discus throw	7th	
Women's	2024 Indoor	Mya Lesnar	Shot put	1st	
Women's	2024 Outdoor	Gabi Morris	Shot put	2nd	
Women's	2024 Outdoor	Mya Lesnar	Shot put	5th	
Women's	2024 Outdoor	Michaela Hawkins	Discus throw	6th	
Women's	2025 Indoor	Mya Lesnar	Shot put	4th	
Women's	2025 Outdoor	Mya Lesnar	Shot put	1st	
Women's	2025 Outdoor	Klaire Kovatch	Discus throw	th	

== See also ==
- Category:Colorado State Rams men's track and field athletes (11)
- Category:Colorado State Rams women's track and field athletes (10)
