= 1979 AIAW Indoor Track and Field Championships =

- Dates: March 2–3, 1979
- Host city: Columbia, Missouri
- Venue: Hearnes Multipurpose Building
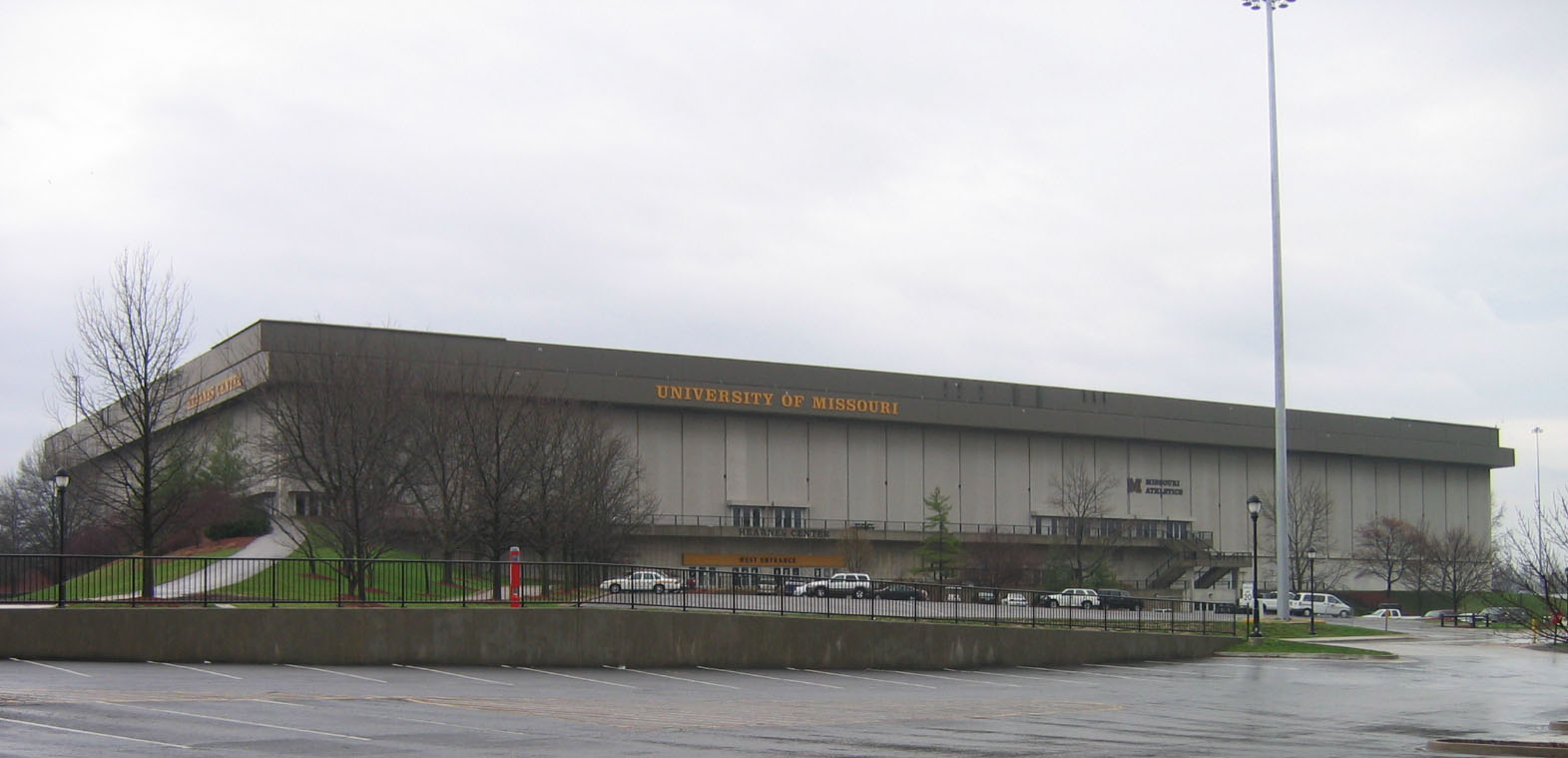

The 1979 Missouri National Invitational Women's Indoor Track and Field Meet was the second unofficial collegiate championship event for women's indoor track and field to be sanctioned by the Association for Intercollegiate Athletics for Women in the United States. It was a forerunner of the first official AIAW Indoor Track and Field Championships. Held for the first two years as an invitational, the meet gained official national championship status in 1980, when a qualification process was employed. It was called a "de facto" championship until then.

The meet was contested March 2−3, 1979 in Columbia, Missouri at the Hearnes Multipurpose Building and won by the Iowa State Cyclones track and field team. Unlike other AIAW-sponsored sports, there were not separate large and small college division championships for indoor track and field. At the championships, Themis Zambrzycki was noted for winning all but one of the events in the new indoor pentathlon event.

== Team standings ==
- Scoring: 10 points for a 1st-place finish, 8 points for 2nd, 6 points for 3rd, 4 points for 4th, 2 points for 5th, and 1 point for 6th. Top 10 teams shown.

Rank	Team	Points
1st place, gold medalist(s)	Iowa State Cyclones	51
2nd place, silver medalist(s)	UTEP Miners	47
3rd place, bronze medalist(s)	Kansas Jayhawks	34
4th	Kansas State Wildcats	26
5th	Arkansas Razorbacks	24
6th	Colorado Buffaloes	22
7th	Villanova Wildcats	19
8th	BYU Cougars	18
8th	Rutgers Scarlet Knights	18
10th	District of Columbia Firebirds	17

== Results ==
- Only results of finals are shown

60 yards
Pl.	Name	Team	Mark
1st place, gold medalist(s)	Sheila Calmese	Kansas Jayhawks	6.90
2nd place, silver medalist(s)	Lori Green	Kansas Jayhawks	7.04
3rd place, bronze medalist(s)	Elizabeth Young	District of Columbia Firebirds	7.05
4th	Sandra Milliner	Chicago State Cougars	7.08
5th	Hazel Lucas	Rutgers Scarlet Knights	7.16
6th	Wanda Hooker	Memphis Tigers	7.18

300 yards
Pl.	Name	Team	Mark
1st place, gold medalist(s)	Elizabeth Young	District of Columbia Firebirds	34.50 NR
2nd place, silver medalist(s)	Jeanine Brown	UTEP Miners	34.92
3rd place, bronze medalist(s)	Sheila Calmese	Kansas Jayhawks	34.93
4th	Nancy Miller	Utah State Aggies	35.12
5th	Lori Green	Kansas Jayhawks	35.57
6th	Edna Brown	Temple Owls	35.74

600 yards
Pl.	Name	Team	Mark
1st place, gold medalist(s)	Diann Ousley	Arkansas Razorbacks	1:21.22
2nd place, silver medalist(s)	Dorianne Lambelet	Villanova Wildcats	1:21.6
3rd place, bronze medalist(s)	Dana Gildden	Missouri Tigers	1:21.9
4th	Wanda Trent	Kansas State Wildcats	1:23.0
5th	Laura Ferguson	Wyoming Cowgirls	1:23.0
6th	Carolyn Brinkley	District of Columbia Firebirds	1:25.2
	Lee Ballenger	Colorado Buffaloes	DNF

1000 yards
Pl.	Name	Team	Mark
1st place, gold medalist(s)	Debbie Vetter	Iowa State Cyclones	2:29.81
2nd place, silver medalist(s)	Brigid Leddy	Villanova Wildcats	2:32.6
3rd place, bronze medalist(s)	Diane Vetter	Iowa State Cyclones	2:34.2
4th	Janel LeValley	Kansas State Wildcats	2:35.5
5th	Siri Bjelland	Oklahoma Sooners	2:39.3
6th	Deb Hertzog	Kansas Jayhawks	2:39.8

Mile run
Pl.	Name	Team	Mark
1st place, gold medalist(s)	Debbie Pearson Mitchell	UTEP Miners	4:47.35
2nd place, silver medalist(s)	Jody Rittenhouse	Arkansas Razorbacks	4:50.9
3rd place, bronze medalist(s)	Renee Urish	Kansas State Wildcats	4:51.6
4th	Wendy Van Mierlo	Illinois State Redbirds	4:53.9
5th	Brigid Leddy	Villanova Wildcats	4:54.6
6th	Michelle Brown	Kansas Jayhawks	4:58.7

3 miles
Pl.	Name	Team	Mark
1st place, gold medalist(s)	Dana Slater	Colorado Buffaloes	16:05.45
2nd place, silver medalist(s)	Karen Bridges	Oklahoma State Cowgirls	16:10.2
3rd place, bronze medalist(s)	Mary Seybold	Iowa State Cyclones	16:22.9
4th	Alanna McCarthy	Morehead State Eagles	16:27.9
5th	Matha Stinson	Missouri Tigers	16:41.0
6th	Cindy Bradley	Montana State Bobcats	16:55.9
7th	Pippa Holman	Rutgers Scarlet Knights	16:59.3

60 yards hurdles
Pl.	Name	Team	Mark
1st place, gold medalist(s)	Debra Deutsch	Rutgers Scarlet Knights	7.80
2nd place, silver medalist(s)	Gayle Harris Watkins	Western Kentucky Lady Toppers	7.82
3rd place, bronze medalist(s)	Julie Smithers	Rutgers Scarlet Knights	7.84
4th	Linda Bourn	BYU Cougars	7.98
5th	Debbie Kilhoffer	Illinois State Redbirds	8.06
6th	Pam Page	Missouri Tigers	8.11
7th	Lori Lowrey	Kansas Jayhawks	8.19

4 × 220 yards relay
Pl.	Name	Team	Mark
1st place, gold medalist(s)	Amy Whicker	Temple Owls	1:40.69 NR
1st place, gold medalist(s)	Ellen Howard	Temple Owls	1:40.69 NR
1st place, gold medalist(s)	Venita McDavid	Temple Owls	1:40.69 NR
1st place, gold medalist(s)	Laura Carroll	Temple Owls	1:40.69 NR
2nd place, silver medalist(s)	Ellie Mahall	Iowa State Cyclones	1:41.5
2nd place, silver medalist(s)	Loreen Spearman	Iowa State Cyclones	1:41.5
2nd place, silver medalist(s)	Sumetia Wells	Iowa State Cyclones	1:41.5
2nd place, silver medalist(s)	Laurie Eder	Iowa State Cyclones	1:41.5
3rd place, bronze medalist(s)	Dannette Alford	UTEP Miners	1:41.7
3rd place, bronze medalist(s)	Jeanine Brown	UTEP Miners	1:41.7
3rd place, bronze medalist(s)	Esther Otieno	UTEP Miners	1:41.7
3rd place, bronze medalist(s)	Carrman Rivers	UTEP Miners	1:41.7
4th		Auburn Tigers	1:42.8
5th	Debra Spencer	Memphis Tigers	1:44.8
5th	Wanda Hooker	Memphis Tigers	1:44.8
5th	Jill Ford	Memphis Tigers	1:44.8
5th	Mary Walker	Memphis Tigers	1:44.8
6th		Villanova Wildcats	1:44.8

4 × 440 yards relay
Pl.	Name	Team	Mark
1st place, gold medalist(s)	Laurie Eder	Iowa State Cyclones	3:47.06 NR
1st place, gold medalist(s)	Debbie Esser	Iowa State Cyclones	3:47.06 NR
1st place, gold medalist(s)	Ellie Mahall	Iowa State Cyclones	3:47.06 NR
1st place, gold medalist(s)	Sumetia Wells	Iowa State Cyclones	3:47.06 NR
2nd place, silver medalist(s)	Leesa Wallace	Kansas State Wildcats	3:50.8
2nd place, silver medalist(s)	Freda Hancock	Kansas State Wildcats	3:50.8
2nd place, silver medalist(s)	Lorraine Davidson	Kansas State Wildcats	3:50.8
2nd place, silver medalist(s)	Wanda Trent	Kansas State Wildcats	3:50.8
3rd place, bronze medalist(s)		Arkansas Razorbacks	3:52.2
4th		Colorado Buffaloes	3:52.5
5th		Auburn Tigers	3:52.6
6th	Esther Otieno	UTEP Miners	3:53.5
6th	Carrman Rivers	UTEP Miners	3:53.5
6th	Bea Reese	UTEP Miners	3:53.5
6th	Jeanine Brown	UTEP Miners	3:53.5

Distance medley relay
Pl.	Name	Team	Mark
1st place, gold medalist(s)	Evelyn McMeekin	Iowa State Cyclones	11:39.39 NR
1st place, gold medalist(s)	Debbie Esser	Iowa State Cyclones	11:39.39 NR
1st place, gold medalist(s)	Debbie Vetter	Iowa State Cyclones	11:39.39 NR
1st place, gold medalist(s)	Diane Vetter	Iowa State Cyclones	11:39.39 NR
2nd place, silver medalist(s)		Colorado Buffaloes	12:05.7

High jump
Pl.	Name	Team	Mark
1st place, gold medalist(s)	Sharon Burrill	Nebraska Cornhuskers	6 ft 1 in (1.85 m)
2nd place, silver medalist(s)	Tammie Thomas	Oklahoma State Cowgirls	5 ft 10 in (1.77 m)
3rd place, bronze medalist(s)	Shawn Corwin	Kansas Jayhawks	5 ft 10 in (1.77 m)
4th	Lucia Chudy	Utah State Aggies	5 ft 9 in (1.75 m)
5th	Kay Barstow	Western Michigan Broncos	5 ft 9 in (1.75 m)
6th	Mary Cragoe	Missouri Tigers	5 ft 8 in (1.72 m)

Long jump
Pl.	Name	Team	Mark
1st place, gold medalist(s)	Esther Otieno	UTEP Miners	19 ft 0 1/2 in (5.8 m)
2nd place, silver medalist(s)	Gayle Harris Watkins	Western Kentucky Lady Toppers	18 ft 9 3/4 in (5.73 m)
3rd place, bronze medalist(s)	Ann Meacham	Eastern Michigan Eagles	18 ft 6 1/2 in (5.65 m)
4th	Annette Sittenauer	Kansas State Wildcats	18 ft 5 1/2 in (5.62 m)
5th	Cheryl Williams	Eastern Michigan Eagles	18 ft 4 in (5.58 m)
6th	Carla Heintz	Montana State Bobcats	18 ft 3 1/2 in (5.57 m)
7th	Sharon Burrill	Nebraska Cornhuskers	18 ft 3 in (5.56 m)
8th	Karesa Robbins	Kansas State Wildcats	

Shot put
Pl.	Name	Team	Mark
1st place, gold medalist(s)	Cecil Hansen	Oklahoma Sooners	51 ft 5 in (15.67 m)
2nd place, silver medalist(s)	Jennifer Smit	UTEP Miners	49 ft 4 1/2 in (15.04 m)
3rd place, bronze medalist(s)	Deanna Patrick	Kansas Jayhawks	47 ft 0 in (14.32 m)
4th	Betty Bogers	UTEP Miners	46 ft 1 in (14.04 m)
5th	Jan Hallier	Illinois State Redbirds	45 ft 1 in (13.74 m)
6th	Joan Fagerness	Minnesota State Mavericks	44 ft 9 3/4 in (13.65 m)

Pentathlon
Pl.	Name	Team	Mark
1st place, gold medalist(s)	Themis Zambrzycki	BYU Cougars	4358 pts
2nd place, silver medalist(s)	Karen Page	Utah State Aggies	4003 pts
3rd place, bronze medalist(s)	Mary Anne Harrington	Colorado State Rams	3804 pts
4th	Vivian Estes Eschavarria	BYU Cougars	3725 pts
5th	Allison Manley	Murray State Racers	3572 pts
6th	Dona Lane	Iowa State Cyclones	3504 pts

== See also ==
- Association for Intercollegiate Athletics for Women championships § Indoor track and field
- 1979 NCAA Division I Indoor Track and Field Championships
