= Bunkers Hill, Jamaica =

Location in Trelawny Parish, Jamaica

Coordinates: 18.39303°N 77.69557°W

Bunkers Hill, also Bunker's Hill, Bunker Hill and Bunkerhill, is a location in Trelawny Parish, Jamaica.

By 1787 Bunkers Hill Estate was owned by Thomas Reid and producing sugar and rum. In 1809 there were 215 enslaved people on the estate, and the highest recorded figure was 241 in 1823. After the Slavery Abolition Act 1833, an 1851 report noted that "Bunker's Hill estate, which had been mortgaged for £30,000, was last sold for £2,500".

Bunkers Hill is now mainly a farming community. The Unity Primary School was founded in 1909 and still serves the community.

In 2017 the Bunker's Hill Cultural Xperience opened as a tourist attraction offering visitors eco-tourism and cultural experiences.

== Notable residents ==
Notable residents of Bunkers Hill have included:

- Rex Nettleford, Vice Chancellor of University of the West Indies
- Audrey Reid, high-jumper
- Rosemarie Whyte, sprinter
- Warren Weir, sprinter
