= Debo Powers =

American politician and educator

Member of the Montana House of Representatives from the 3rd district
- Incumbent
- Assumed office January 6, 2025
- Preceded by: Braxton Mitchell
- In office November 5, 2019 – January 4, 2021
- Preceded by: Zac Perry
- Succeeded by: Braxton Mitchell

Personal details
- Born: Philadelphia, Pennsylvania
- Party: Democratic
- Education: Florida State University
- Occupation: Educator

Debo Powers is an American politician and former educator. She is a Democratic member of the Montana House of Representatives serving District 3. She previously represented the District from 2019 to 2021. District 3 is roughly in northern Flathead County north of Columbia Falls to the Canadian border.

== Early life and education ==
Powers was born in Philadelphia, Pennsylvania and attended Florida State University.

== Career ==
Powers was a public school teacher. She was then a school principal from 1998 to 2011.

In October 2019, Powers was appointed to represent District 3 in the Montana House of Representatives, after former Representative Zac Perry resigned to attend graduate school. Powers assumed office on November 5, 2019.

Powers ran for election to a full term in 2020. She was unopposed in the Democratic primary, but lost to Republican Braxton Mitchell in the general election by 20 points. She did not participate in the 2022 election.

In 2024, she won the District 3 election defeating Republican challenger Cathy Mitchell by a 3.6% margin. She was sworn in January 2025 to serve in the 69th Legislature.

=== 69th Montana Legislature (2025) ===
Powers was sworn in to the 69th Montana Legislature on January 6, 2025. She was appointed to the House Appropriations Committee and served on the Subcommittee for Natural Resources, Transportation, and Agriculture. Powers introduced HB 509 to improve the college loan forgiveness program for beginning teachers....and her bill became law. She introduced bills on affordable housing, wildlife protection, and greenhouse gas emissions. She spoke on the House floor to protect our nonpartisan judiciary, our public lands, and the rights of citizens over corporations. She worked across the aisle to continue Medicaid Expansion, stop attempts to make judge elections partisan, and increase funding for public schools that raised beginning teacher salaries (which were the lowest in the country).

=== 2026 re-election ===
Powers is running for re-election in 2026. The Democratic primary is June 2, 2026. Republican candidates Cathy Mitchell and Derek Peachey are competing in the Republican primary on the same date. The general election is November 3, 2026.

== Personal life ==
Powers lives in Polebridge, Montana.

== See also ==
- Montana House of Representatives, District 3
