= Cindy Gilbert =

American high jumper

Personal information
- Nationality: American
- Born: June 23, 1957 (age 69)

Sport
- Sport: Athletics
- Event: High jump

Cindy Gilbert (born June 23, 1957) is an American athlete. She competed in the women's high jump at the 1972 Summer Olympics.

Gilbert competed in the AIAW for the UCLA Bruins track and field team, finishing 7th in the high jump at the 1976 AIAW Outdoor Track and Field Championships.
