= Charlotte Lewis (basketball) =

American basketball player

Personal information
- Born: September 10, 1955 Peoria, Illinois, U.S.
- Died: September 17, 2007 (aged 52) Peoria, Illinois, U.S.
- Listed height: 6 ft 2 in (1.88 m)

Career information
- High school: Woodruff (Peoria, Illinois)
- College: Illinois State (1975–1978)
- Position: Center

Career history
- ?–?: Iowa Cornets

Career highlights
- Kodak All-American (1977)
- Stats at Basketball Reference
Medals
Women's Basketball
Representing United States
Olympic Games
Silver medal – second place	1976 Montreal	Team competition
Pan American Games
Gold medal – first place	1975 Mexico	Team competition

Charlotte Lewis (September 10, 1955 – September 17, 2007) was an American basketball player who competed on the 1976 United States Olympic team.

== High school ==
Lewis attended Woodruff High School in 1974 but did not play basketball because the Peoria public schools did not yet offer a varsity basketball for females. Despite this lack of opportunity within the school, she played basketball on the playgrounds of Peoria, usually playing with boys. However, her ability came to the attention of Jill Hutchinson, who was working on building a program at Illinois State University. Lewis was invited to enroll at ISU to further her basketball career.

== College ==
While at ISU, Lewis help the Redbirds win four state championships. She set the record for most rebounds in a game (27) and in a season (345); records which are still school records as of 2017. Lewis earned a letter in each of her four years at Illinois state. In the 1976–77 season the team recorded a record of 20–6 which led to a national ranking, 11th in the AIAW. She was named a Kodak All-American in 1977 and listed as a finalist for the Wade Trophy (an award for the nation's top female athlete). Lewis's accomplishments led to her induction into the Missouri Valley Conference Hall of Fame in 2016.

Lewis was also an accomplished long jumper and javelin thrower for the Illinois State Redbirds track and field team, placing 3rd in the nation in the long jump at the 1975 AIAW Outdoor Track and Field Championships.

== USA Basketball ==
=== Pan Am ===
Lewis was named to the USA Basketball team roster. She would play for the team in the 1975 USA Women's Pan American Team. The games were originally planned for Santiago, Chile, then Sao Paulo, Brazil and finally held in Mexico City, Mexico in October. The Pan Am team had failed to win the gold in 1967 and 1971. This year, the team would be more successful, compiling a 7–0 record, and winning the gold medal for the first time since 1963.

=== Olympics ===
Lewis was named to the USA national team selected to play in the 1976 Olympics the first ever Olympic competition for a women's basketball team. While the team lost to the dominant Soviet Union team, they beat Czechoslovakia to win the silver medal.

== Professional career ==
Lewis left school before graduating, and turned professional. She joined a professional team in France and played there for two years, before returning to the states and playing for the Iowa Cornets, a team in the Women's Professional Basketball League, the first professional basketball league for women in the US. While the story is certainly exaggerated, while playing for the Iowa team a Chicago sportswriter marveled at her strength, claiming that "when she spiked the ball in response to an officiating call, it took six seconds to return to the floor". The coach of the Cornets, Steve Kirk, ran a practice drill he called "War" which had exactly one rule— "anything goes". Lewis noted "he expected you to be able to make baskets when you are following and when you are filed. He expected you to be in that defensive position, to not let them go even when you are getting hit". After her pro career, she return to ISU and completed her degree.
