= Drew Moss =

American football player (born 2003)

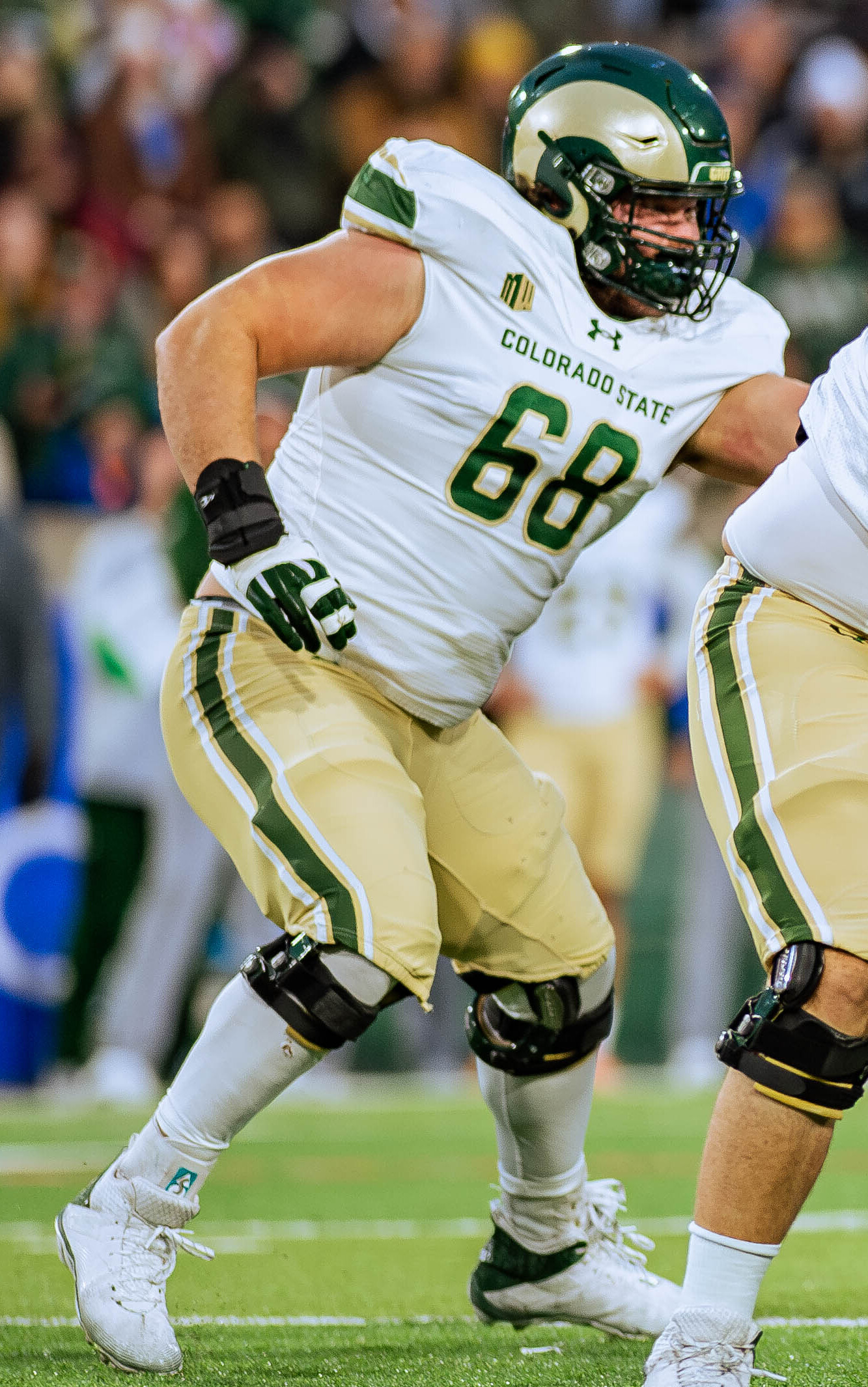
- Moss with Colorado State in 2024

No. 67 – Tennessee Titans
- Position: Center
- Roster status: Practice squad

Personal information
- Born: May 21, 2003 (age 23); Richardson, Texas, U.S.
- Listed height: 6 ft 3 in (1.91 m)
- Listed weight: 310 lb (141 kg)

Career information
- High school: Richardson (Richardson, Texas)
- College: Lamar (2021–2022); Colorado State (2023–2024)
- NFL draft: 2025: undrafted

Career history
- San Francisco 49ers (2025); Tennessee Titans (2025–present)

Awards and highlights
- Second team All-Mountain West (2024)

Career NFL statistics as of 2025
- Games played: 5
- Stats at Pro Football Reference

Drew Moss (born May 21, 2003) is an American professional football center for the Tennessee Titans of the National Football League (NFL). He played college football for the Lamar Cardinals and Colorado State Rams and was signed by the San Francisco 49ers as an undrafted free agent in 2025.

== Early life and college career ==
Moss was born on May 21, 2003, in Richardson, Texas. He attended Richardson High School where he competed in football and track and field. An offensive lineman in football, he was a three-time all-district selection, served as team captain and was named the 2020 District 7-6A Utility Player of the Year.

After high school, Moss enrolled at Lamar University in 2021, playing two seasons for the Lamar Cardinals football team. He started all 11 games for the Cardinals during both the 2021 and 2022 seasons. Moss then transferred to Colorado State University in 2023. With the Colorado State Rams, Moss was named honorable mention All-Mountain West Conference (MW) in 2023 after starting 12 games at guard. He then was named All-MW in 2024 after starting 13 games.

== Professional career ==
Pre-draft measurables
Height	Weight	Arm length	Hand span	Wingspan	40-yard dash	10-yard split	20-yard split	20-yard shuttle	Three-cone drill	Vertical jump	Broad jump	Bench press
6 ft 3 3/8 in (1.91 m)	303 lb (137 kg)	32 1/8 in (0.82 m)	9 1/8 in (0.23 m)	6 ft 6 3/4 in (2.00 m)	5.00 s	1.70 s	2.84 s	4.58 s	7.65 s	31.5 in (0.80 m)	9 ft 3 in (2.82 m)	20 reps
All values from Pro Day

=== San Francisco 49ers ===
After going unselected in the 2025 NFL draft, Moss signed with the San Francisco 49ers as an undrafted free agent. After impressing in preseason, Moss made the team's 53-man roster for the 2025 season. He made five appearances for the team as a backup lineman. On October 29, 2025, Moss was waived by the 49ers.

=== Tennessee Titans ===
On October 30, 2025, Moss was claimed off waivers by the Tennessee Titans.

On August 30, 2026, Moss was waived by the Titans as a part of final roster cuts; he was re-signed with the team's practice squad the next day. He was released by Tennessee on September 15. On September 22, Moss was re–signed to the Titans' practice squad.

== Personal life ==
In July 2025, Moss announced that he was in a relationship with collegiate shot put champion Mya Lesnar, who also attended Colorado State.
