= Alex Burl =

American football player (1931–2009)

No. 22
- Position: Halfback

Personal information
- Born: August 8, 1931; Warren, Arkansas, U.S.
- Died: December 6, 2009 (aged 78); Denver, Colorado, U.S.
- Listed height: 5 ft 10 in (1.78 m)
- Listed weight: 185 lb (84 kg)

Career information
- High school: Manual (CO)
- College: Colorado State
- NFL draft: 1954: 30th round, 350th overall pick

Career history
- Chicago Cardinals (1956)

Career NFL statistics
- Rushing yards: 2
- Rushing average: 2
- Receptions: 2
- Receiving yards: 24
- Total touchdowns: 1
- Stats at Pro Football Reference

Alexander Burl Jr. (August 8, 1931 – December 6, 2009) was an American professional football halfback. He was drafted by the Chicago Cardinals in the 30th round (350th overall) of the 1954 NFL Draft. He played for the Chicago Cardinals in 1956. He played college football at Colorado A&M, now known as Colorado State.

Burl was also an All-American sprinter for the Colorado State Rams track and field team, finishing 5th in the 200 meters at the 1954 NCAA track and field championships.

Burl was inducted into the Colorado State University Athletics Hall of Fame in 2000.

He died of a heart attack on December 6, 2009, in Denver, Colorado, at age 78.
