= Vernetta Lesforis =

Saint Lucian sprinter (born 1975)

Personal information
- Born: 4 May 1975 (age 51) Castries, Saint Lucia

Sport
- Sport: Track and field
Medal record
Athletics
Representing Saint Lucia
CARIFTA Games Junior (U20)
Bronze medal – third place	1992 Nassau	4x400m relay

Vernetta Cheryl Lesforis (born 4 May 1975) is a Saint Lucian sprinter who specialized in the 400 metres.

Lesforis is from Castries, Saint Lucia. She initially attended Missouri Valley College. Before her sophomore year she transferred to the Missouri State Lady Bears track and field team, where she finished 5th anchoring their 4 × 400 metres relay at the 1999 NCAA Division I Outdoor Track and Field Championships.

She won the gold medal at the 1999 Central American and Caribbean Championships in a career best time of 52.21 seconds. She also competed at the 2000 Olympic Games without reaching the final round.
