= Braxton Mitchell =

American politician (born 2000)

Member of the Montana House of Representatives
- Incumbent
- Assumed office January 4, 2021
- Preceded by: Debo Powers
- Constituency: 5th district (2025-present); 3rd district (2021-2025)

Personal details
- Born: May 20, 2000 (age 26) Whitefish, Montana, U.S.
- Party: Republican
- Education: Flathead Valley Community College

Braxton Mitchell (born May 20, 2000) is an American politician and businessman who serves as the Republican Majority Whip of the Montana House of Representatives and as Chairman of the House Agriculture Committee. He represented Montana’s 3rd district from 2021 to 2025, and at the time, became one of the youngest elected officials in the country. Due to redistricting following the U.S. census, Mitchell ran for District 5 in the 2024 elections.

== Early life and education ==
Mitchell was born in Whitefish, Montana, and was later adopted. Mitchell grew up working for his family's businesses in Columbia Falls, most notably Montana Jerky Company.

While attending Columbia Falls High School, he organized a pro-gun walkout after millions of students nationwide walked out to protest gun violence. Mitchell attended Flathead Valley Community College after high school.

== Career ==
Mitchell's involvement in politics began in 2017 during a special election for Montana's lone congressional district, where Republican Greg Gianforte defeated Democrat Rob Quist. Mitchell saw many of his own beliefs reflected in Gianforte, and helped with his campaign as a high school student.

In 2020, he ran for the 3rd district of the Montana House of Representatives. Mitchell defeated incumbent Democrat Debo Powers in the November general election by 20 points, and became one of the youngest elected officials in the country.

During the 2021 legislative session, Mitchell served as a member on the House Taxation Committee, the House Education Committee, and the House Fish, Wildlife, and Parks Committee.

In the 2023 session, Mitchell served as a member on the House Judiciary Committee, the House Education Committee, and the House Agricultural Committee. He sponsored 10 bills that session with 9 of them passing the Montana House and Senate.

In April 2024, Mitchell toured the U.S.-Mexico border as part of a trip organized by NumbersUSA.

Following the 2024 election, Mitchell was elected by his colleagues to serve as the Majority Whip of the Montana House of Representatives for the 69th Legislative Session.

In 2025, Mitchell serves as the chairman of the House Agricultural Committee. He also serves as a member on the House Judiciary Committee, the House Energy, Technology, and Federal Relations Committee, and as a member of the Rules Committee

Mitchell has served as an ambassador for Turning Point USA.

== Elections ==
In 2020, he ran for the 3rd district of the Montana House of Representatives. Mitchell defeated incumbent Democrat Debo Powers in the November general election by 20 points.

In 2022, he ran for re-election. In June 2022, Mitchell faced a Republican primary challenger. Mitchell defeated his primary challenger with over 73% of the vote. In November 2022, Mitchell won his re-election bid by 18 points.

In 2024, he ran for re-election. Following legislative redistricting, Mitchell opted to run in the newly drawn House District 5, which encompassed a large portion of his former district. In November 2024, Mitchell won his re-election bid by 47.6 points.

In 2026, he ran for re-election. In November 2026, Mitchell won his re-election bid by 41.4 points

== Notable bills ==
=== State veterans cemetery ===
In January 2023, Mitchell sponsored successful legislation that would set aside 150 acres of land adjacent to the Montana Veterans Home in Columbia Falls, Montana to create a State Veterans Cemetery in his district. The cemetery is open to veterans in nine Montana counties: Lincoln, Sanders, Flathead, Lake, Glacier, Toole, Pondera, Teton and Liberty counties. "These veterans deserve everything for their sacrifices," Mitchell said in a statement after the bill passed the House. "It's a great day for Flathead County, Northwest Montana and Montana as a whole." The bill was signed into law by Republican Governor Greg Gianforte on April 18, 2023.

=== Bobby’s Law ===
In January 2025, Mitchell sponsored HB 267, a bill that strengthened penalties for fatal DUI offenses by creating a new crime: aggravated vehicular homicide while under the influence. The law applies to drivers with a blood alcohol content of 0.16% or higher who cause a death, establishing a mandatory minimum prison sentence of three years, with a maximum of up to 30 years and potential fines of up to $50,000. The legislation was named in memory of Bobby Dewbre, a Columbia Falls resident, childhood friend, and neighbor of Mitchell, who was killed in a drunk driving crash. The driver responsible received just 18 months in county jail—the maximum sentence allowable under existing law for one count of misdemeanor careless driving involving death or serious bodily injury and one count of aggravated DUI. Calling the sentence “unfathomable,” Mitchell cited the case as the catalyst for reform. “Montana has some of the most lax DUI laws in the country,” he said, “and HB 267 will help change that.” Bobby’s Law was signed into law by Governor Greg Gianforte on April 25, 2025, with Bobby Dewbre’s family standing alongside Mitchell and the Governor as it was signed into law.

=== Flag restriction bill ===
In February 2025, Mitchell sponsored HB 819, legislation that prohibits the display of flags and banners representing a political viewpoint on property owned or leased by state, county, and local governments, such as the Black Lives Matter flag and the pride flags. This restriction applies exclusively to displays put up by government entities, including those at public schools, universities, courthouses, and administrative buildings. The ban includes flags featuring symbols tied to a specific race, sexual orientation, or gender identity. The bill was signed into law by Governor Greg Gianforte on May 13, 2025, and took effect immediately. In June 2025, the Missoula City Council responded to the law by formally designating the pride flag as an official city flag, thereby allowing its continued display on government property. In response, Mitchell vowed to change the law to forbid the flag when legislature reconvenes.

=== Artificial intelligence ===
In January 2025, Mitchell sponsored HB 178, legislation that limits the use of artificial intelligence (AI) by state and local governments in Montana. The bill prohibits government entities from using AI for purposes such as behavioral manipulation, discriminatory classification, malicious activity, or mass surveillance, except in limited law enforcement situations. It also requires transparency when AI is used in public-facing communications or services. Additionally, any government decision or recommendation made with the help of AI must be reviewed and approved by a real person, specifically a qualified state officer or public employee, before it can take effect. Governor Greg Gianforte signed the bill into law on May 5, 2025, and it took effect immediately.

=== Drag Performance ban ===
In February 2023, Mitchell introduced House Bill 359 which would prohibit drag performances in public libraries. Mitchell told NBC News that "the bill is intended to ensure hyper sexualized events are kept out of our taxpayer funded schools and libraries." The bill passed the Montana House and Senate on May 2, 2023 and was signed into law by Republican Governor Greg Gianforte on May 22, 2023. This bill was temporarily blocked by Federal Judge Brian Morris, on Friday July 28, 2023. The judge used the language of the bill to determine that it was crafted with discriminatory intent, constituting an unconstitutional breach of freedom of speech.

=== Digital drivers licenses ===
In 2023 Mitchell sponsored House Bill 519 which allows for Montanan's to obtain a digital version of their drivers license in their Apple Wallet in addition to their physical license by September 2025. The Montana Motor Vehicle Division came in as proponents to the bill. The bill was signed into law by Republican Governor Greg Gianforte on April 26, 2023. In 2025, Mitchell sponsored HB196 and HB249, which enhanced Montana’s digital identification laws before its roll out in September 2025. The legislation makes it unlawful to falsify a digital driver’s license, authorizes the ability to use a digital license to purchase age-restricted products like alcohol and tobacco, and enhances privacy protections by requiring businesses that scan digital IDs to use the scan data solely for age verification, prohibit its sale or transfer, and delete the data within 180 days. Both bills were signed into law by Governor Greg Gianforte.

=== Coal power ===
Mitchell sponsored a measure that would have made it more difficult for a private utility company in Montana to shutter a power plant, a move aimed at blocking the closing of the Colstrip coal-fired power plant in eastern Montana. The measure was tabled in March 2021. The Colstrip plant's owners, Puget Sound Energy, closed two of the four units at the plant in January 2021, and announced that the remaining two units would close within five years.

=== Ballot requirements ===
In 2025 Mitchell sponsored legislation that changed voting requirements for absentee voting to require that a voter's birth year be written on the outside of the return envelope. The bill became law in May of 2025, passing the Republican-controlled state legislature along party lines. The new requirements led to over six thousand rejected ballots before the law was found unconstitutional under the Montana Constitution.

=== Transgender athletes ===
In 2021 Mitchell supported a bill in the Montana Legislature that sought to ban transgender athletes from competing on teams that do not align with their sex assigned at birth. He stated that "Someone gender fluid can wake up one morning and say, 'I'm a man today,' or 'I'm a woman today,' as a tactic to win in sports." The bill was signed into law by Republican Governor Greg Gianforte on May 7, 2021.

== Electoral history ==
=== 2020 election ===
Montana's 3rd District House of Representatives election, 2020
Party	Candidate	Votes	%
Republican	Braxton Mitchell	3,586	60.0
Democratic	Debo Powers	2,393	40.0
Total votes		5,979	100

=== 2022 general election ===
Montana's 3rd District House of Representatives election, 2022
Party	Candidate	Votes	%
Republican	Braxton Mitchell	2,751	59.0
Democratic	Andrea Getts	1,934	41.0
Total votes		4,685	100

=== 2024 general election ===
Montana's 5th District House of Representatives election, 2024
Party	Candidate	Votes	%
Republican	Braxton Mitchell	4,671	73.8
Democratic	Steve Paugh	1,654	26.2
Total votes		6,325	100

=== 2026 general election ===
Montana's 5th District House of Representatives election, 2026
Party	Candidate	Votes	%
Republican	Braxton Mitchell	3,790	71.0
Democratic	Luca Welle	1,568	29.0
Total votes		5,358	100
