= Missouri State Bears and Lady Bears track and field =

American college track and field team

- University: Missouri State University
- Head coach: Jordan Fife
- Conference: C-USA
- Location: Springfield, Missouri
- Outdoor track: Betty & Bobby Allison South Stadium
- Nickname: Bears and Lady Bears

The Missouri State Bears and Lady Bears track and field teams are the track and field programs that represents Missouri State University. The Bears and Lady Bears compete in NCAA Division I as a member of the Conference USA. The teams are based in Springfield, Missouri, at the Betty & Bobby Allison South Stadium.

The program is coached by Jordan Fife. The track and field program officially encompasses multiple teams because the NCAA considers men's and women's indoor track and field and outdoor track and field as separate sports.

The Bears men's teams were cut in 2006 following the outdoor track and field season, leaving only the women's teams since then. The cuts were announced in December 2005 as part of an initiative to save US$350,000 to $500,000.

Heptathlete Tracy Partain is the program's highest finisher at the NCAA championships, placing runner-up at the 2006 NCAA Division I Outdoor Track and Field Championships.

== Postseason ==
=== AIAW ===
The Lady Bears have had five AIAW All-Americans finishing in the top six at the AIAW indoor or outdoor championships.

AIAW All-Americans
Championships	Name	Event	Place
1973 Outdoor	Marti Adams	4 × 440 yards relay	3rd
1973 Outdoor	Vicki Malin	4 × 440 yards relay	3rd
1973 Outdoor	Mary Gunn	4 × 440 yards relay	3rd
1973 Outdoor	Mary Phyl Dwight	4 × 440 yards relay	3rd
1976 Outdoor	Carol Cook	Mile run	6th
1976 Outdoor	Carol Cook	Two miles	5th

=== NCAA ===
As of August 2025, a total of 2 men and 4 women have achieved individual first-team All-American status for the team at the Division I men's outdoor, women's outdoor, men's indoor, or women's indoor national championships (using the modern criteria of top-8 placing regardless of athlete nationality).

First team NCAA All-Americans
Team	Championships	Name	Event	Place	Ref.
Women's	1992 Outdoor	Dedra Davis	Long jump	5th	
Women's	1995 Outdoor	Melinda Sallins	400 meters hurdles	5th	
Women's	1996 Outdoor	Melinda Sallins	400 meters hurdles	8th	
Women's	1997 Indoor	Michelle Baptiste	Long jump	7th	
Women's	1999 Indoor	Verneta Lesforis	4 × 400 meters relay	8th	
Women's	1999 Indoor	Juliet Pommells	4 × 400 meters relay	8th	
Women's	1999 Indoor	Mashere Harrison	4 × 400 meters relay	8th	
Women's	1999 Indoor	Augustina Charles	4 × 400 meters relay	8th	
Women's	1999 Outdoor	Juliet Pommells	4 × 400 meters relay	5th	
Women's	1999 Outdoor	Augustina Charles	4 × 400 meters relay	5th	
Women's	1999 Outdoor	Trudi Garrett	4 × 400 meters relay	5th	
Women's	1999 Outdoor	Verneta Lesforis	4 × 400 meters relay	5th	
Men's	2000 Outdoor	Gregory Hughes	Triple jump	6th	
Men's	2001 Outdoor	Gregory Hughes	Triple jump	8th	
Men's	2002 Indoor	Justin Alberts	4 × 400 meters relay	7th	
Men's	2002 Indoor	Ryan Smith	4 × 400 meters relay	7th	
Men's	2002 Indoor	Jamial Rolle	4 × 400 meters relay	7th	
Men's	2002 Indoor	Alexis Roberts	4 × 400 meters relay	7th	
Men's	2006 Indoor	Fabian Florant	Triple jump	6th	
Women's	2006 Outdoor	Tracy Partain	Heptathlon	2nd	

== See also ==
- Category:Missouri State Bears track and field athletes (2)
- Category:Missouri State Lady Bears track and field athletes (5)
