= Mya Lesnar =

American athlete (born 2002)

Personal information
- Nationality: American
- Born: Mya Lynn Lesnar; April 10, 2002 (age 24)
- Education: Colorado State University
- Father: Brock Lesnar

Sport
- Sport: Athletics
- Event: Shot put

Achievements and titles
- Personal bests: Shot put: 19.60m (Ft. Collins, 2025); Hammer: 63.50m (Long Beach, 2023); Discus: 53.62m (Clovis, 2023); Weight throw: 22.06m (Albuquerque, 2024)

Mya Lynn Lesnar (born April 10, 2002) is an American track and field athlete. In 2024, she became the NCAA indoor champion in the shot put and won 2025 NCAA outdoor Championships.

== Early life ==
A native of Alexandria, Minnesota, she attended Alexandria Area High School. In April 2019, she set a Central Lakes Conference Indoor Track Championship Meet record in the shot put. She graduated from Colorado State University with a bachelor's degree in social work.

== Athletic career ==
Lesnar spent her freshman and sophomore college years at Arizona State University before transferring colleges after the 2021–22 school year. She won the weight throw at the Mountain West Indoor Championships on February 25, 2023 with a personal best throw of 20.68m.

In December 2023, she set a new Colorado State University women's shot put record with a throw of 18.50 metres at the Mines Alumni Classic. The previous school record had stood at 17.55 metres. In February 2024, she recorded a personal best distance of 22.06m in the weight throw in Albuquerque, New Mexico at the Mountain West Championship. At the same event, she extended her shot put personal best to 19.10 metres.

Competing at the NCAA Indoor Championships in Boston, Massachusetts, she won the shot put competition with a throw of 18.53 metres.

In May 2024, she won the women's Mountain West Outdoor Championship with a shot put distance of 19.08 meters, a new outdoors personal best. She was named the Mountain West Conference Female Athlete of the Year.

A year later on May 3, 2025, Lesnar threw a personal best of 19.60 meters to break the CSU program and facility (Jack Christiansen Field) record. This was also the best outdoor shot put throw by any female in the NCAA in 2025. She threw 19.01 metres to win the 2025 NCAA Outdoor Championships in Eugene, Oregon in June 2025, 16 cm ahead of second place Abria Smith. She finished in tenth place at the 2025 Prefontaine Classic on 5 July.

== Personal life ==
Mya Lesnar is the daughter of retired professional wrestler and former mixed martial artist Brock Lesnar and Nicole McClain. She has two half-brothers, Turk and Duke, from Lesnar's marriage with Rena Greek, known professionally as Sable. She also has a step-sister, Mariah, from Greek's previous marriage.

Lesnar is in a relationship with Tennessee Titans guard Drew Moss, who also attended Colorado State.
