= Karen Page (athlete) =

New Zealand pentathlete (born 1954)

Personal information
- Born: 1954 (age 71–72) Auckland, New Zealand

Sport
- Sport: Pentathlon

Karen C. Page (later Tapper; born 1954) is a former pentathlete from New Zealand.

In 1978, Page travelled to Albuquerque, New Mexico, to compete in the United States indoor pentathlon event, finishing second. Also in 1978, Page represented New Zealand at the Commonwealth Games in Edmonton, Canada, placing fifth.

In the AIAW, Page represented the Utah State Aggies track and field team at the 1979 AIAW Indoor Track and Field Championships and 1979 AIAW Outdoor Track and Field Championships. She finished runner-up in the pentathlon at the 1979 indoor championships.

She was selected for the New Zealand Olympic team to compete at the 1980 Summer Olympics in Moscow, however the New Zealand boycott of the Games meant she did not attend.

In 1981 Page won the gold medal, and set a new national women's record for the pentathlon, at the Fourth Pacific Conference Games in Christchurch.
