= Lisa Uhl =

American runner (born 1987)

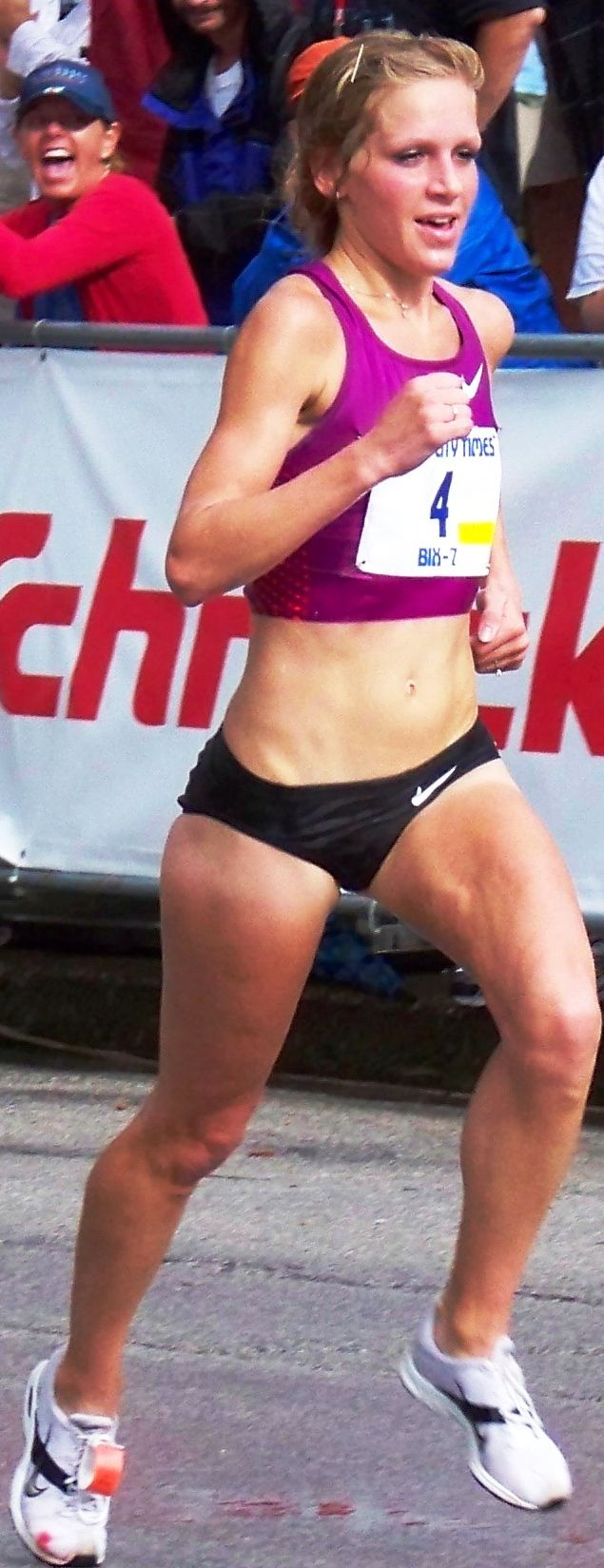
- Lisa Uhl winning the 2010 Bix 7 Road Race

Personal information
- Born: August 31, 1987 (age 38) Fort Dodge, Iowa, U.S.

Sport
- Country: United States
- Events: 5,000m 10,000m
- College team: Iowa State University

Achievements and titles
- Personal bests: 5,000 m: 14:55.74; 10,000 m: 31:12.80

Lisa Uhl (née Koll) (born August 31, 1987, Fort Dodge, Iowa) is an American runner. She is a four-time NCAA Division One champion, former NCAA record holder in the 10,000 meters, and the sixth fastest American woman to ever cover that distance. She competed in the 10,000 meters in the 2012 Summer Olympics. She competed for Iowa State University.

== College career ==
While attending Iowa State University, Uhl won the Big 12 outdoor track and field championship in the 10,000 meters in 2007 as a Freshman. In 2008, she set the American Collegiate record in the 10,000 meters with a time of 32:11.13 at the Stanford Invitational in Palo Alto, California. This mark was beat later that year by eventual 2008 NCAA 5,000 meter champion Sally Kipyego of Texas Tech University in a time of 31:25.45. Later that year Uhl went on to win the NCAA outdoor track and field championship, beating the field by almost a full minute, and finished 8th at the 2008 United States Olympic trials in Eugene Oregon. During the 2008-2009 season she was named the ESPN The Magazine/CoSIDA Academic All-America of the Year winner for track & field/cross country.

At the 2010 NCAA indoor championships Uhl won the 5,000 meter run by over 10 seconds in a time of 15:39.65. Just a few months later she broke the 10,000 meter record for the second time at the Stanford Invitational, finishing with a time of 31 minutes, 18.07 seconds. This stood as the record for just over 14 years, until it was broken by Parker Valby by 27.64 seconds in 2024. She also dominated the outdoor collegiate 5,000 meter event. At the Payton Jordan invitational she finished fourth in an elite 5,000 meter field, beaten only by World Championship bronze medalist Shannon Rowbury, Olympic bronze medalist Shalane Flanagan, and reigning US national 10,000 meter champion Amy Yoder Begley, in a time of 15 minutes and 17.76 seconds. It was the best NCAA 5,000 meter time in the nation that year by almost 20 seconds.

Uhl's record breaking outdoor season continued when she won the Big 12 10,000 meter title, becoming the first woman ever to win four straight conference titles in the same event. At her final meet as a collegian Lisa Kohl became both the NCAA outdoor 5,000 meter and 10,000 meter champion. One of only four athletes to have ever done so, and the first to do it since 1996. She won the 10,000 meters by over 20 seconds in a time of 32:49.35 and the 5,000 meters by over 30 seconds in a time of 15:23.80.

At the end of her 2010 track season, Uhl won the Honda Sports Award as the nation's best collegiate female track and field athlete of the year and was nominated as one of three athletes for the female collegiate sports person of the year (all sports).

== Professional career ==
Uhl turned professional shortly after the collegiate championships, signing with Peter Stubbs Management. In her first track meet as a professional she finished second in the 10,000 meters at the US national championships in a time of 32:11.72, beaten only by the reigning US national champion Amy Yoder Begley. Held at her hometown track, Koll took the lead midway through the race and held it until the final lap when Begley closed in 65 seconds to finish in 32:06.45.

2010

On July 24, 2010, Uhl won the Bix 7 Road Race in Davenport, Iowa, capturing the US seven mile road racing championship.

In 2010, Uhl deferred entry to veterinary school at Iowa State University to move to Portland, Oregon to run for Nike under a new coach, Jerry Schumacher. At the 2011 USA Cross Country Championships in February she took third place behind Shalane Flanagan and Molly Huddle.

2011

Uhl missed most of the running season in 2011 due to plantar fasciitis, and a stress fracture of her fifth metatarsal.

2012

At the 2012 Olympic Trials, Uhl qualified for the London Olympics in the 10,000 m. and finished 13th at 2012 London Olympics in 31:12.80 which is the 18th fastest American ever.

2013

Uhl finished 9th in the 10,000 meters in 33:35.80 at 2013 USA Outdoor Track and Field Championships.

2014

In June 2014, she returned to racing at the 2014 Garry Bjorklund Half Marathon - clocking 1:16:16 (5:50 per mile) as her first hard workout to finish 14 out of 4434 Females. On September 7, 2014, she won the City of Lakes Half Marathon in a time of 1:17:12.

Uhl qualified for the United States Marathon Olympic Trials on October 12 at the 2014 Chicago Marathon where she finished 18th in a time of 2:40:51.

2015

Uhl finished 10th at Payton Jordan Invitational 3rd heat of the 5000 meters in 16:31.38 on May 2, 2015.

Uhl won the 2015 Dam to Dam half marathon in May (77 minutes) in Des Moines, IA.

== Personal life ==
Uhl married former Iowa State runner and Des Moines Architect Kiel Uhl in September 2011. Kiel was inducted in 2015 class of Iowa State University Track and Field Hall of Fame.
