= Iowa State Cyclones track and field =

- Founded: 1859; 166 years ago
- University: Iowa State University
- Head coach: Martin Smith (4th season)
- Conference: Big 12
- Location: Ames, IA
- Indoor track: Lied Recreation Center (Capacity: 2,000)
- Outdoor track: SW Athletic Complex
- Nickname: Cyclones
- Colors: Cardinal and gold

NCAA Indoor Tournament Appearances
- Men: 1967, 1968, 1969, 1973, 1975, 1977, 1978, 1980, 1984, 1992, 1993, 1997, 1998, 2000, 2002; Women: 1987, 1989, 1990, 1991, 1992, 1997, 1998, 1999, 2000, 2001, 2002, 2003, 2005

NCAA Outdoor Tournament Appearances
- Men: 1921, 1922, 1928, 1930, 1931, 1932, 1933, 1936, 1943, 1944, 1945, 1946, 1957, 1964, 1967, 1978, 1980, 1981, 1982, 1983, 1984, 1985, 1986, 1987, 1989, 1990, 1991, 1992, 1993, 1994, 1995, 1996, 1997, 1999, 2000, 2005, 2006; Women: 1984, 1985, 1987, 1988, 1989, 1990, 1991, 1998, 1999, 2001, 2002

Conference Indoor Championships
- Men: 1944, 1945, 1946, 1984, 1986, 1990, 1991, 1993; Women: 1977, 1978, 1979

Conference Outdoor Championships
- Men: 1908, 1944, 1945, 1981, 1983, 1984, 1985, 1986, 1988, 1991, 1992, 1993, 1994; Women: 1974, 1975, 1976, 1977, 1978, 1979

Men Indoor National Championships
- 9 (by 7 athletes)

Women Indoor National Championships
- 10 (by 9 athletes)

Men Outdoor National Championships
- 13 (by 11 athletes)

Women Outdoor National Championships
- 14 (by 8 athletes)

Iowa State Cyclones track and field represents Iowa State University (ISU) and competes in the Big 12 Conference of NCAA Division I. The team is coached by Martin Smith, he is currently in his 4th year at Iowa State. Originally, the men's and women's teams were considered separate; but beginning in the 2007 season the two teams were combined and are now operated as one single sport at the university. The Cyclones host their home indoor meets at Lied Recreational Facility and their home outdoor meets at the Cyclone Sports Complex, both are located on Iowa State's campus.

== History ==
=== Men's ===
The Cyclones first put together a squad in 1921, competing in the Missouri Valley Conference. They experienced their first success under head coach and former track standout Robert Simpson, he coached at ISU from 1926 to 1937. Simpson molded Iowa State's first track stars in Ray Conger and Ray Putnam who would go on to win individual NCAA Championships for the Mile Run in the 1927 and 1931 respectively.

After struggling for several decades the Cyclones reached new highs under Coach Bill Bergan. The Cyclones had finished last or next to last in 21-straight Big Eight Conference outdoor meets before his arrival, under his leaderships they won 10 of 14 Big Eights Conference outdoor track championships. ISU athletes achieved All-America honors 104 times and captured 156 Big Eight individual titles under Bergan's direction. Three individual standouts from Bergan's squads were Danny Harris, Jonah Koech, and Jon Brown. Harris was a three time NCAA champion in the 400 meter hurdles in 1984, 1985, and 1986. Harris would then go on to win a silver medal representing the United States at the 1984 Los Angeles Olympics. Hailing originally from Kenya, Jonah Koech is one of the most decorated athletes in Iowa State's history. He was a member of six Big Eight championship squads as well as winning six individual conference titles. Koech's marquee event was the 5,000 meter run, where he won three NCAA Indoor Championships in 1990, 1991, and 1993. In addition to Jon Brown's 1992 NCAA Indoor Championship in the 5,000 meter run, he would go on to represent Great Britain in the 1996, 2000, and 2004 Olympic games.

After Bergan retired in 1994, the team would once again struggle to compete until the arrival of current head coach Martin Smith. In Smith's four years the biggest individual success has been Edward Kemboi. In 2015 Kemboi won NCAA titles for the 800 Meter Run in both the Indoor and Outdoor championships.

=== Women's ===
The Iowa State Women's Track and Field team first got their start in 1973 under Head Coach Chris Murray. Their first individual success was Peg Neppel-Darrah when she won two AIAW titles at the 1976 AIAW Outdoor Championships in both the Two Mile and Three Mile run. Iowa State's most decorated track and field athlete wouldn't arrive until 1984 in Moroccan runner, Nawal El Moutawakel. Competing in the 400 Meter Hurdles El Moutawakel won the 1984 Outdoor NCAA Championship and Olympic Gold representing her home country of Morocco. With her win she became the first Moroccan woman and first woman from a Muslim majority nation to win Olympic Gold.

Iowa State's most recent stars are Lisa Koll and Betsy Saina. Koll is a four time NCAA champions. In the 10,000 Meter Run she won the 2008 and 2010 Outdoor Championships and in the 5,000 Meter Run she won the 2010 Indoor Championship 2010 Outdoor Championship. Koll would go on to represent the United States at the 2012 London Olympics in the 10,000 Meter Run. While at Iowa State Betsy Saina won the 5,000 Meter Run at the 2012 Indoor NCAA Championship and the 10,000 Meter Run at the 2013 Outdoor NCAA Championship. She would then go on to place fourth in the 10,000 Meter Run at the Rio Olympics.

== Championships ==
=== Men's team championships ===
Titles	Type	Year
National Championships
0	Men's NCAA Indoor Team Champions	
0	Men's NCAA Outdoor Team Champions	
0 Total
Conference Championships
13	Big Eight Conference Men's Outdoor Team Champion	1908, 1944, 1945, 1981, 1983, 1984, 1985, 1986, 1988, 1991, 1992, 1993, 1994
8	Big Eight Conference Men's Indoor Team Champion	1944, 1945, 1946, 1984, 1986, 1990, 1991, 1993
0	Big 12 Conference Men's Indoor Team Champion	
0	Big 12 Conference Men's Outdoor Team Champion	
21 Total

=== Women's team championships ===
Titles	Type	Year
National Championships
0	Women's NCAA Indoor Team Champions	
0	Women's NCAA Outdoor Team Champions	
1	AIAW Indoor Team Champions	1979
0 Total
Conference Championships
6	Big Eight Conference Women's Outdoor Team Champion	1974, 1975, 1976, 1977, 1978, 1979
3	Big Eight Conference Women's Indoor Team Champion	1977, 1978, 1979
0	Big 12 Conference Women's Indoor Team Champion	
0	Big 12 Conference Women's Outdoor Team Champion	
10 Total

=== Men's Indoor Individual NCAA Champions ===
Men's Indoor Individual NCAA Champions
Year	Name	Event
1967	Steve Carson	600 Meter Run
1984	Gareth Brown (Note: Brown initially won the 800 m in 1:49.47, but his position was later vacated after someone at the meet recognized him from Leeds University, from which he had previously graduated without disclosure and thus was ineligible. The runner-up was Daniel Rojas of the Air Force Academy.)	800 Meter Run
1984	Bob Verbeeck	1,500 Meter Run
1985	Brian Tietjens	High Jump
1990	Jonah Koech	5,000 Meter Run
1991	Jonah Koech	5,000 Meter Run
1992	Jon Brown	5,000 Meter Run
1993	Jonah Koech	5,000 Meter Run
2015	Edward Kemboi	800 Meter Run

=== Men's Outdoor Individual NCAA Champions ===
Men's Outdoor Individual NCAA Champions
Year	Name	Event
1922	Lloyd Rathbun	Two-Mile Run
1922	Deac Wolters	440 Yard Dash
1927	Ray Conger	Mile Run
1931	Ray Putnam	Mile Run
1943	George Gast	Javelin Throw
1981	Scott Crowell	Discus Throw
1984	Danny Harris	400 Meter Hurdles
1985	Danny Harris	400 Meter Hurdles
1985	Brian Tietjens	High Jump
1986	Danny Harris	400 Meter Hurdles
1993	Jonah Koech	5,000 Meter Run
1996	Dmitry Drozdov	3,000 Meter Steeplechase
2015	Edward Kemboi	800 Meter Run

=== Women's Indoor Individual National Champions ===
Women's Indoor Individual National Champions
Year	Name	Event
1979	Debbie Vetter	1000 yards
1979	Laurie Eder, Debbie Esser, Ellie Mahall, Sumetia Wells	4 × 440 yards relay
1979	Evelyn McMeekin, Debbie Esser, Debbie Vetter, Diane Vetter	Distance medley relay
1981	Christine McMeekin	Distance medley relay
1981	Wren Schafer	Distance medley relay
1981	Sumetia Wells	Distance medley relay
1981	Dianne Vetter	Distance medley relay
1989	Edith Nakiyingi	800 Meter Run
1991	Edith Nakiyingi	800 Meter Run
1992	Karen Glerum	Mile Run
2010	Lisa Uhl	5,000 Meter Run
2012	Betsy Saina	5,000 Meter Run
2014	Christina Hillman	Shot Put

=== Women's Outdoor Individual National Champions ===
Women's Outdoor Individual National Champions
Year	Name	Event
1976	Debbie Esser	400 Meter Hurdles
1976	Peg Neppel-Darrah	Two Mile Run
1976	Peg Neppel-Darrah	Three Mile Run
1977	Debbie Esser	400 Meter Hurdles
1978	Debbie Esser	400 Meter Hurdles
1978	Debbie Vetter	1,500 Meter Run
1979	Debbie Esser	400 Meter Hurdles
1982	Colleen Hanna	100 Meter Dash
1984	Nawal El Moutawakel	400 Meter Hurdles
2008	Lisa Uhl	10,000 Meter Run
2010	Lisa Uhl	10,000 Meter Run
2010	Lisa Uhl	5,000 Meter Run
2013	Betsy Saina	10,000 Meter Run
2014	Christina Hillman	Shot Put

== Olympians ==
Cyclones in the Olympics
Name	Year	Country	Event	Place
Ray Conger	1928 Amsterdam	United States	1,500 Meter Run	10th
Clive Sands	1976 Montreal	Bahamas	100 Meter Dash; 200 Meter Dash; 4 × 100 Metre Relay	DNP; DNP; DNP
David Korir	1980 Moscow	Kenya	Boycotted	
James Moi	1980 Moscow	Kenya	Boycotted	
Sunday Uti	1980 Moscow	Nigeria	4 × 400 Metre Relay	DNP
Nawal El Moutawakel	1984 Los Angeles	Morocco	400 Meter Hurdles	Gold
Danny Harris	1984 Los Angeles	United States	400 Meter Hurdles	Silver
Henrik Jørgensen	1984 Los Angeles	Denmark	Marathon	19th
Moses Kiyai	1984 Los Angeles	Kenya	Long Jump; Triple Jump	DNP; DNP
Dorthe Rasmussen	1984 Los Angeles	Denmark	Marathon	13th
Sunday Uti	1984 Los Angeles	Nigeria	4 X 400 Meter Relay	Bronze
Bob Verbeeck	1984 Los Angeles	Belgium	5,000 Meter Run	13th
Allan Zachariasen	1984 Los Angeles	Denmark	Marathon	25th
Henrik Jørgensen	1988 Seoul	Denmark	Marathon	22nd
Joseph Kipsang	1988 Seoul	Kenya	Marathon	DNF
Edith Nakiyingi	1988 Seoul	Uganda	800 Meter Run	27th
Yobes Ondieki	1988 Seoul	Kenya	5,000 Meter Run	12th
Sunday Uti	1988 Seoul	Nigeria	400 Meter Dash; 4 X 400 Meter Relay	DNP; 7th
Maria Akraka	1992 Barcelona	Sweden	1,500 Meter Run	DNP
Yobes Ondieki	1992 Barcelona	Kenya	5,000 Meter Run	5th
Jon Brown	1996 Atlanta	Great Britain	10,000 Meter Run	10th
John Nuttall	1996 Atlanta	Great Britain	5,000 Meter Run	DNP
Suzanne Youngberg	1996 Atlanta	Great Britain	Marathon	58th
Jon Brown	2000 Sydney	Great Britain	Marathon	4th
Jon Brown	2004 Athens	Great Britain	Marathon	4th
Aurelia Trywiańska	2004 Athens	Poland	100 Meter Hurdles	DNP
Aurelia Trywiańska	2008 Beijing	Poland	100 Meter Hurdles	DNP
Lisa Koll	2012 London	United States	10,000 Meter Run	13th
Guor Marial	2012 London	Independent Olympic Athletes	Marathon	47th
Mohamed Hrezi	2016 Rio	Libya	Marathon	77th
Betsy Saina	2016 Rio	Kenya	10,000 Meter Run	5th
Hillary Bor	2016 Rio	United States	3,000 Meter Steeplechase	7th

== Facilities ==
Iowa State track athletes train and compete in one of the finest indoor facilities in the world. Iowa State's $13 million Lied Recreation-Athletic Facility complements Iowa State's outdoor track complex. The combination gives Cyclone track athletes first-rate, year-round practice facilities. The Lied Recreation-Athletic Facility was the site of the 1998, 2000 and 2007 Big 12 Indoor Track and Field Championships. The indoor facility includes a 300-meter track that is one of the largest and fastest indoor surfaces in the world. Over the summer of 1999 the track was resurfaced at a cost of over $600,000 with a mondo surface, showing ISU's commitment to being amongst the best in the nation.

Their home meets are held at the recently opened Cyclone Sports Complex. The $13 million facility opened in 2012.
