= Pam Greene =

American sprinter

Personal information
- Nationality: American
- Born: February 15, 1954 (age 72) Denver, Colorado, United States

Sport
- Sport: Sprinting
- Event: 200 metres

Pam Greene (born February 15, 1954) is an American sprinter. She competed in the women's 200 metres at the 1972 Summer Olympics. Greene qualified for the 1980 U.S. Olympic team but was unable to compete due to the 1980 Summer Olympics boycott. Greene ran on the 4x100 relay at the 1973 World University Games, and was AIAW Champion in 1973 in the 200 metres. She also received one of 461 Congressional Gold Medals created especially for the spurned athletes.

Greene competed collegiately for the Northern Colorado Bears track and field team, winning the 220 yards at the 1973 AIAW Outdoor Track and Field Championships. In 1974, Greene represented the Colorado State Rams and was a finalist in the 100 yards at the 1974 AIAW Outdoor Track and Field Championships.
