= Marilyn Carlson =

American scholar of mathematics education

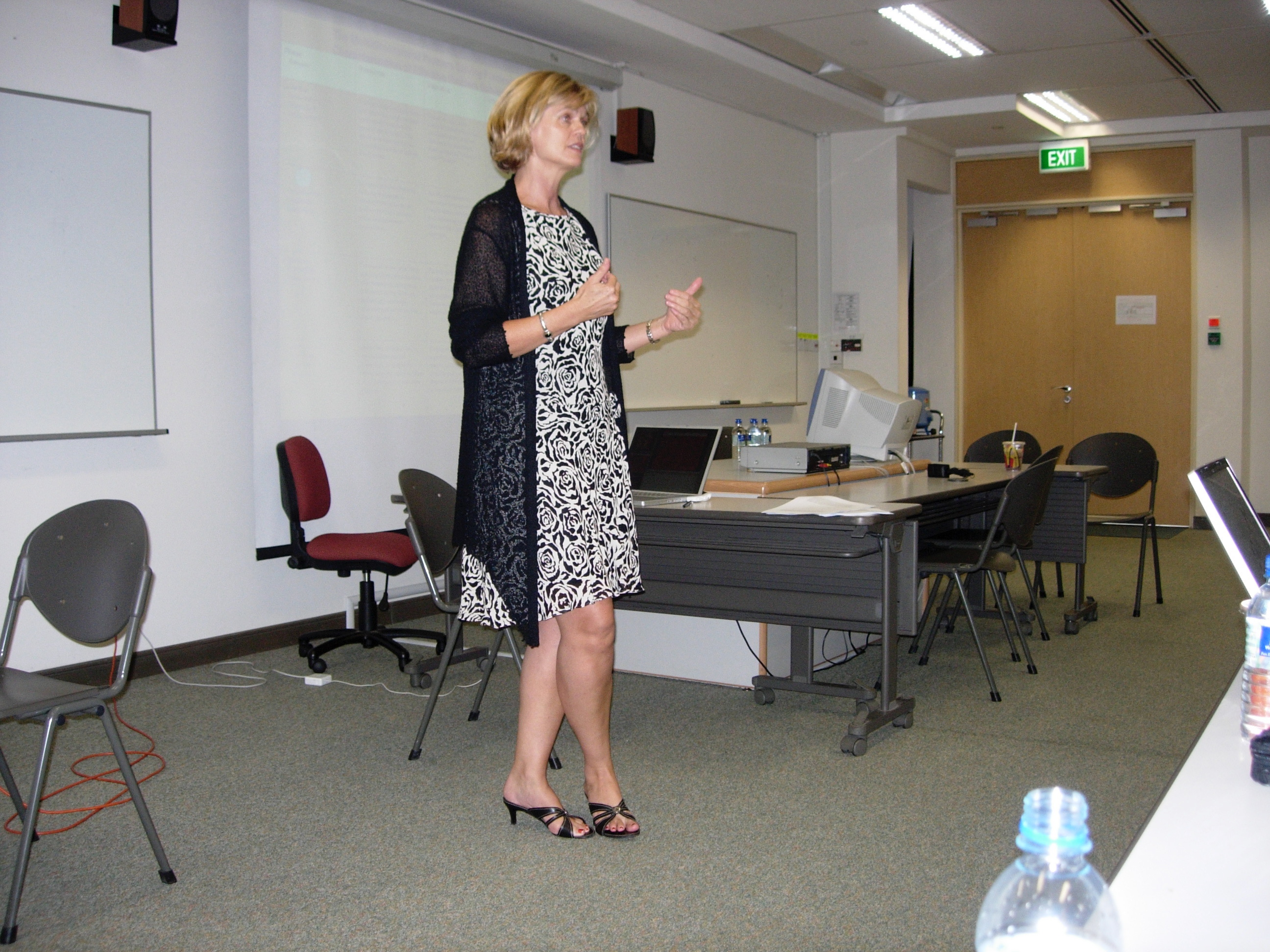
Carlson at a 2006 mathematics education conference

Marilyn Paula Carlson is an American scholar of mathematics education specializing in preparing mathematics educators for precalculus and in guiding future mathematics teachers towards understanding student thinking. She is a professor in the School of Mathematical and Statistical Sciences at Arizona State University.

== Education and career ==
Carlson is originally from Cleveland, Missouri. She became a star athlete at the University of Central Missouri, competing both in basketball and in track and field. She placed second in the 800m race at the 1976 AIAW Outdoor Track and Field Championships. She earned All-America honors four times, and was the inaugural recipient of the university's annual outstanding senior female athlete award.

After graduating cum laude from the University of Central Missouri in 1977, she earned a master's degree in computer science before shifting her interests to mathematics education. She completed her Ph.D. at the University of Kansas in 1995. Her dissertation, A Longitudinal Investigation of the Function Concept, was jointly supervised by Josef Dorfmeister and Philip Treisman.

She joined Arizona State University in 1995. From 2003 to 2008 she headed the university's Center for Research on Education in Science, Mathematics, Engineering and Technology (CRESMET), afterwards returning to a faculty position in mathematics.

== Recognition ==
The University of Central Missouri named Carlson to their athletics hall of fame in 1995.

Carlson was the 2008 recipient of the Annie and John Selden Prize for Research in Undergraduate Mathematics Education of the Mathematical Association of America.
