= Audrey Reid (high jumper) =

Jamaican high jumper (born 1952)

Personal information
- Born: 25 March 1952 (age 73) Bunkers Hill, Colony of Jamaica, British Empire
- Height: 1.70 m (5 ft 7 in)
- Weight: 63 kg (139 lb)

Sport
- Sport: Athletics
- Event: High jump

Audrey Reid (married German, born 25 March 1952) is a Jamaican athlete. She competed in the women's high jump at the 1968, 1972 and the 1976 Summer Olympics.

Reid also competed for the Texas Woman's Pioneers track and field team, competing in sprints and winning the high jump at the 1972 DGWS Outdoor Track and Field Championships.

Her personal best in the event is 1.855 metres set in 1976.
