= Wendy Koenig =

American middle-distance runner

Personal information
- Nationality: American
- Born: May 28, 1955 (age 70)

Sport
- Sport: Middle-distance running
- Event: 800 metres

Wendy Koenig (also known as Wendy Knudson; born May 28, 1955) is an American middle-distance runner. She competed in the 800 metres at the 1972 Summer Olympics and the 1976 Summer Olympics.

Koenig competed in the AIAW for the Colorado State Rams track and field team, finishing runner-up in the 880 yards at the 1974 AIAW Outdoor Track and Field Championships.
