= Peg Neppel =

American athlete

Personal information
- Full name: Peggy Neppel
- Born: August 16, 1953 Dolliver, Iowa
- Died: October 16, 1981

Sport
- Sport: Athletics
- Event: 10000 metres

Peggy "Peg" Neppel later Peg Darrah (16 August 1953 - 16 October 1981) was an American world record holder in the women's 10,000 metres.

== Early life ==
Neppel was a student at Iowa State University where she achieved master's and bachelor's degrees.

== Athletics career ==
Neppel recorded one world record in the women's 10,000 metres of 33:15.1 (33:15.09) on 9 June 1977 in Westwood, California.

The mark is unofficial because the world governing body of athletics, the IAAF (now World Athletics), did not list an official world record in the event until 1981.

The time was achieved whilst winning the 1977 AAU championship at that distance.

Neppel is also attributed with two other world best times:

- In the 3 miles of 15:41.69 in 1976
- In the 5,000 m of 15:52.27 in 1977 at the Drake Relays.

Neppel was also inaugural champion at the Association for Intercollegiate Athletics for Women (AIAW) cross-country championships in 1975. The event was hosted by her college.

== Later Life and Death ==
Peg Neppel married Mark Darrah in 1979. She was just a few weeks short of receiving her doctorate in animal science when she tragically died on 16 October 1981 of pneumonia, a complication of the cancer she was suffering from.

== Awards and Accolades ==
In 1998, Neppel was inducted into the Iowa State University Hall of Fame.

Neppel is also an inductee in the Iowa Association of Track Coaches (IATC) Hall of Fame.
