= Debbie Esser =

American track and field athlete

Medal record

Women's athletics

Representing the United States

IAAF World Cup
Bronze medal – third place	1979 Montreal	400 m hurdles

Deborah Esser-Karman (born March 26, 1957) is an American former track and field athlete who competed in the 400-meter hurdles.

== Biography ==
Esser attended high school in Woodbine, Iowa and went on to break the national high school record for the 400 m hurdles. She was chosen as the Track & Field News High School Athlete of the Year in 1976. She continued hurdling while at Iowa State University and became the first woman to take four collegiate titles in the same event, winning the Association for Intercollegiate Athletics for Women (AIAW) championship in the 400 m hurdles. She left college with nine All-American honours and 15 Big Eight Conference titles for the Iowa State Cyclones team and was inducted into the institution's hall of fame in 1998.

Esser twice broke the American record in the 400 m hurdles in the period before it was a standard international event for women. Her first record was 58.98 seconds, set on June 11, 1976, and she improved this to 57.07 seconds on May 21, 1977. The 57.07 was winning the AIAW National Track and Field Championship at Drake Stadium. Her lifetime best for the event was 56.63 seconds, set in 1979.

She was a mainstay of the American women's hurdles scene in the 1970s. She won two national titles, setting a championship record of 57.3 seconds in 1975 and returning to the top in 1978. She made the top three nationally in 1976, 1977 and 1979. Her sole international honour was a bronze medal at the 1979 IAAF World Cup held in Montreal.

== International competitions ==
Year	Competition	Venue	Position	Event	Notes
1979	IAAF World Cup	Montreal, Canada	3rd	400 m hurdles	56.75

== National titles ==
- USA Outdoor Track and Field Championships
  - 400 m hurdles: 1975, 1978
