= Flathead Valley Community College =

Community college in Kalispell, Montana, U.S.

Coordinates: 48°13′40″N 114°19′40″W

- Type: Public community college
- Established: 1967; 59 years ago
- Academic affiliations: Space-grant
- Endowment: $14 Million (2021)
- President: Jane A. Karas
- Academic staff: 216 instructional staff (2022)
- Students: 3,162
- Location: Kalispell, Montana, United States
- Campus: 216 acres (87 ha)
- Website: fvcc.edu

Flathead Valley Community College (FVCC) is a public community college in Kalispell, Montana.

== History ==
The college was founded in 1967. It is one of three two-year institutions in the state that are outside the control of the University of Montana System, Montana State University System, and the tribal college system. The school offers an Associate of Applied Science degree in 24 different majors, as well as an Associate in Arts degree for substance abuse counseling and an Associate in Science degree for nursing. The college added an AAS degree in Brewing Science and Brewery Operations in 2015, and has built an on-campus brewery for student instruction.

The school's sports teams were known as the Mountaineers and Mountainettes or sometimes the Timberettes. The Mountainettes track and field and cross country teams won national championships in the 1970s.

== Administration ==
The college is governed by an elected board of trustees. The president is appointed by the board to administer the operations of the institution. The current president is Jane A. Karas.

== Notable people ==
- Frank Garner, law enforcement officer and member of the Montana House of Representatives
- Braxton Mitchell, member of the Montana House of Representatives
