= Western Kentucky Hilltoppers and Lady Toppers track and field =

American college track and field team

- University: Western Kentucky University
- Head coach: Lee Wood
- Conference: C-USA
- Location: Bowling Green, Kentucky
- Outdoor track: Charles M. Ruter Track and Field Complex
- Nickname: Hilltoppers and Lady Toppers

The Western Kentucky Hilltoppers and Lady Toppers track and field team is the track and field program that represents Western Kentucky University. The Hilltoppers and Lady Toppers compete in NCAA Division I as members of the Conference USA. The team is based in Bowling Green, Kentucky, at the Charles M. Ruter Track and Field Complex.

The program is coached by Lee Wood. The track and field program officially encompasses four teams because the NCAA considers men's and women's indoor track and field and outdoor track and field as separate sports.

Runner Nick Rose is the only two-time NCAA champion for the program. He won the 3000 meters at the 1975 NCAA Indoor Track and Field Championships and 1976 NCAA Indoor Track and Field Championships. The men's team was nationally ranked and won its 12th straight conference title in 1975.

== Postseason ==
=== AIAW ===
The Lady Toppers have had five AIAW All-Americans finishing in the top six at the AIAW indoor or outdoor championships.

AIAW All-Americans
Championships	Name	Event	Place
1978 Indoor	Gayle Harris Watkins	60 yards hurdles	5th
1978 Indoor	Angie Bradley	Long jump	4th
1979 Indoor	Gayle Harris Watkins	60 yards hurdles	2nd
1979 Indoor	Gayle Harris Watkins	Long jump	2nd
1979 Outdoor	Anita Jones	400 meters hurdles	6th
1980 Indoor	Angie Bradley	Long jump	5th
1981 Outdoor	Victoria Bowman	Discus throw	6th
1981 Outdoor	Lorri Kokkola	Javelin throw	6th

=== NCAA ===
As of August 2025, a total of 29 men and 6 women have achieved individual first-team All-American status for the team at the Division I men's outdoor, women's outdoor, men's indoor, or women's indoor national championships (using the modern criteria of top-8 placing regardless of athlete nationality).

First team NCAA All-Americans
Team	Championships	Name	Event	Place	Ref.
Men's	1969 Outdoor	Hector Ortiz	10,000 meters	8th	
Men's	1969 Outdoor	Henry Jackson	Long jump	8th	
Men's	1970 Indoor	Henry Jackson	Long jump	2nd	
Men's	1970 Outdoor	Henry Jackson	Long jump	5th	
Men's	1971 Outdoor	Hector Ortiz	Mile run	6th	
Men's	1973 Indoor	Nick Rose	3000 meters	3rd	
Men's	1973 Indoor	Jesse Stuart	Shot put	2nd	
Men's	1973 Outdoor	Nick Rose	5000 meters	6th	
Men's	1973 Outdoor	Emmett Briggs	Triple jump	5th	
Men's	1973 Outdoor	Jesse Stuart	Shot put	2nd	
Men's	1973 Outdoor	Chuck Eneix	Discus throw	4th	
Men's	1974 Indoor	Nick Rose	5000 meters	5th	
Men's	1974 Indoor	Jesse Stuart	Shot put	2nd	
Men's	1974 Outdoor	Tony Staynings	3000 meters steeplechase	8th	
Men's	1974 Outdoor	Nick Rose	5000 meters	2nd	
Men's	1974 Outdoor	Jesse Stuart	Shot put	1st	
Men's	1975 Indoor	Nick Rose	3000 meters	1st	
Men's	1975 Indoor	Tony Staynings	5000 meters	2nd	
Men's	1975 Outdoor	Tony Staynings	3000 meters steeplechase	4th	
Men's	1975 Outdoor	Nick Rose	5000 meters	6th	
Men's	1975 Outdoor	Chris Ridler	5000 meters	7th	
Men's	1975 Outdoor	Jesse Stuart	Shot put	3rd	
Men's	1976 Indoor	Nick Rose	3000 meters	1st	
Men's	1976 Indoor	Tony Staynings	3000 meters	5th	
Men's	1976 Indoor	Charles Ridler	5000 meters	3rd	
Men's	1977 Indoor	Tony Staynings	3000 meters	2nd	
Men's	1977 Outdoor	Tony Staynings	5000 meters	3rd	
Men's	1978 Outdoor	Don Dougalas	400 meters hurdles	5th	
Men's	1979 Indoor	Dave Long	5000 meters	5th	
Men's	1980 Outdoor	Larry Cuzzort	5000 meters	5th	
Men's	1980 Outdoor	Gordon Laine	Long jump	7th	
Men's	1981 Outdoor	Greg Wilson	Triple jump	5th	
Men's	1982 Indoor	Lubomyr Chambul	Shot put	5th	
Men's	1982 Outdoor	Steve Bridges	Long jump	5th	
Men's	1984 Indoor	Ashley Johnson	1500 meters	3rd	
Men's	1984 Outdoor	Ashley Johnson	1500 meters	7th	
Men's	1987 Indoor	Victor Ngubeni	1000 meters	4th	
Men's	1991 Outdoor	Sean Dollman	10,000 meters	4th	
Men's	1992 Indoor	Sean Dollman	5000 meters	3rd	
Men's	1992 Outdoor	Sean Dollman	10,000 meters	1st	
Men's	1996 Outdoor	Nick Aliwell	10,000 meters	7th	
Men's	2004 Outdoor	Jonathan Brown	100 meters	6th	
Men's	2004 Outdoor	Jonathan Brown	200 meters	7th	
Men's	2005 Outdoor	Raigo Toompuu	Discus throw	5th	
Men's	2008 Indoor	Gavin Smellie	4 × 400 meters relay	8th	
Men's	2008 Indoor	Romaine McKay	4 × 400 meters relay	8th	
Men's	2008 Indoor	Alexander Larin	4 × 400 meters relay	8th	
Men's	2008 Indoor	Terrill McCombs	4 × 400 meters relay	8th	
Women's	2009 Indoor	Valerie Brown	400 meters	3rd	
Women's	2009 Indoor	Janet Jesang	5000 meters	7th	
Men's	2009 Outdoor	Gavin Smellie	200 meters	5th	
Women's	2009 Outdoor	Janet Jesang	5000 meters	5th	
Men's	2010 Outdoor	Andrejs Maskancevz	Long jump	7th	
Men's	2011 Outdoor	Ignacio Guerra	Javelin throw	7th	
Women's	2011 Outdoor	Laura Iguane	Hammer throw	7th	
Men's	2012 Outdoor	Ignacio Guerra	Javelin throw	4th	
Men's	2013 Outdoor	Tomas Guerra	Javelin throw	7th	
Women's	2013 Outdoor	Sharika Smith	Triple jump	7th	
Men's	2014 Outdoor	Ja'Karyus Redwine	4 × 100 meters relay	5th	
Men's	2014 Outdoor	Ventavius Sears	4 × 100 meters relay	5th	
Men's	2014 Outdoor	Emmanuel Dasor	4 × 100 meters relay	5th	
Men's	2014 Outdoor	Elvyonn Bailey	4 × 100 meters relay	5th	
Men's	2014 Outdoor	Christopher Chamness	4 × 400 meters relay	4th	
Men's	2014 Outdoor	Emmanuel Dasor	4 × 400 meters relay	4th	
Men's	2014 Outdoor	Ventavius Sears	4 × 400 meters relay	4th	
Men's	2014 Outdoor	Elvyonn Bailey	4 × 400 meters relay	4th	
Men's	2014 Outdoor	Tomas Guerra	Javelin throw	6th	
Women's	2014 Outdoor	Jessica Ramsey	Shot put	8th	
Men's	2015 Outdoor	Ventavius Sears	Long jump	8th	
Men's	2016 Indoor	Emmanuel Dasor	400 meters	7th	
Men's	2016 Outdoor	Kyree King	4 × 100 meters relay	5th	
Men's	2016 Outdoor	Ventavius Sears	4 × 100 meters relay	5th	
Men's	2016 Outdoor	Emmanuel Dasor	4 × 100 meters relay	5th	
Men's	2016 Outdoor	Julius Morris	4 × 100 meters relay	5th	
Men's	2016 Outdoor	Keenon Laine	High jump	8th	
Women's	2022 Indoor	Katie Isenbarger	High jump	5th	

== See also ==
- Category:Western Kentucky Hilltoppers track and field athletes (12)
- Category:Western Kentucky Lady Toppers track and field athletes (3)
