= Memphis Tigers track and field =

College track and field team

- University: University of Memphis
- Head coach: Kevin Robinson
- Conference: AAC
- Location: Memphis, Tennessee
- Outdoor track: Billy J. Murphy Track & Soccer Complex
- Nickname: Tigers
- Colors: Blue and gray

The Memphis Tigers track and field team is the track and field program that represents University of Memphis. The Tigers compete in NCAA Division I as a member of the American Conference. The team is based in Memphis, Tennessee at the Billy J. Murphy Track & Soccer Complex.

The program is coached by Kevin Robinson. The track and field program officially encompasses four teams, as the NCAA regards men's and women's indoor track and field and outdoor track and field as separate sports.

In 2018, Luke Vaughn gave Memphis its first national track and field title since 1981 by winning the discus throw.

== Postseason ==
=== AIAW ===
The Tigers have had four AIAW All-Americans finishing in the top six at the AIAW Track and Field Championships.

AIAW All-Americans
Championships	Name	Event	Place
1979 Indoor	Wanda Hooker	60 yards	6th
1979 Indoor	Debra Spencer	4 × 220 yards relay	5th
1979 Indoor	Wanda Hooker	4 × 220 yards relay	5th
1979 Indoor	Jill Ford	4 × 220 yards relay	5th
1979 Indoor	Mary Walker	4 × 220 yards relay	5th
1979 Outdoor	Wanda Hooker	200 m	4th
1980 Indoor	Wanda Hooker	300 m	3rd

=== NCAA ===
As of 2024, a total of 29 men and 8 women have achieved All-American status at the men's outdoor, women's outdoor, men's indoor, or women's indoor national championships.

First Team NCAA All-Americans
Team	Championships	Name	Event	Place
Men's	1972 Indoor	Ed Hammonds	55 meters	2nd
Men's	1973 Indoor	Ed Hammonds	55 meters	2nd
Men's	1973 Outdoor	Ed Hammonds	100 meters	1st
Men's	1973 Outdoor	Gerald Tinker	100 meters	4th
Men's	1973 Outdoor	Gerald Tinker	200 meters	2nd
Men's	1973 Outdoor	Maurice Knight	4 × 100 meters relay	1st
Men's	1973 Outdoor	Lynn Fox	4 × 100 meters relay	1st
Men's	1973 Outdoor	Ed Taylor	4 × 100 meters relay	1st
Men's	1973 Outdoor	Ed Hammonds	4 × 100 meters relay	1st
Men's	1975 Indoor	Paul Bannon	5000 meters	3rd
Men's	1975 Outdoor	Paul Bannon	10,000 meters	4th
Men's	1976 Indoor	Paul Bannon	5000 meters	4th
Men's	1977 Outdoor	Paul Bannon	10,000 meters	7th
Men's	1979 Indoor	Terron Wright	55 meters hurdles	3rd
Men's	1979 Outdoor	Terron Wright	200 meters	8th
Men's	1980 Indoor	Nick Brooks	800 meters	2nd
Men's	1981 Indoor	Terron Wright	55 meters hurdles	1st
Men's	1981 Outdoor	Terron Wright	110 meters hurdles	4th
Men's	1981 Outdoor	Terron Wright	200 meters	2nd
Men's	1989 Indoor	Tyrone Betters	High jump	7th
Men's	2004 Outdoor	Gaute Myklebust	Discus throw	4th
Women's	2007 Indoor	Gail Lee	Shot put	6th
Men's	2008 Outdoor	Steffen Nerdal	Hammer throw	6th
Women's	2008 Indoor	Susan King	Shot put	4th
Women's	2008 Indoor	Charlotte Abrahamsen	Pentathlon	8th
Women's	2008 Outdoor	Susan King	Shot put	2nd
Men's	2009 Indoor	Steffen Nerdal	Weight throw	2nd
Men's	2010 Indoor	Steffen Nerdal	Weight throw	2nd
Men's	2010 Outdoor	Steffen Nerdal	Hammer throw	4th
Men's	2011 Outdoor	Richard Lowe	400 meters hurdles	7th
Men's	2013 Outdoor	Manuel Ziegler	Triple jump	2nd
Men's	2014 Indoor	Pauls Pujats	Pole vault	3rd
Men's	2015 Outdoor	Pauls Pujats	Pole vault	2nd
Men's	2015 Outdoor	Kyle Bynum	Javelin throw	8th
Women's	2017 Outdoor	Ashley Pryke	Javelin throw	3rd
Men's	2018 Outdoor	Luke Vaughn	Discus throw	1st
Men's	2018 Outdoor	Michael Criticos	Javelin throw	5th
Women's	2018 Outdoor	Ashley Pryke	Javelin throw	7th
Men's	2019 Indoor	Jordan Wesner	High jump	6th
Women's	2022 Indoor	DeeNia McMiller	Weight throw	5th
Women's	2023 Outdoor	Samantha Lenton	Discus throw	5th

== See also ==
- Category:Memphis Tigers men's track and field athletes (7)
