= Rutgers Scarlet Knights track and field =

College track and field team

- University: Rutgers University
- Head coach: Bobby Farrell
- Conference: Big Ten
- Location: Piscataway, New Jersey
- Outdoor track: Bauer Track & Field Complex
- Nickname: Scarlet Knights
- Colors: Scarlet

The Rutgers Scarlet Knights track and field team is the track and field program that represents Rutgers University. The Scarlet Knights compete in NCAA Division I as a member of the Big Ten Conference. The team is based in Piscataway, New Jersey, at the Bauer Track & Field Complex.

The program is coached by Bobby Farrell. The track and field program officially encompasses four teams because the NCAA considers men's and women's indoor track and field and outdoor track and field as separate sports.

Debra Deutsch is the only Rutgers athlete to have won two individual national collegiate titles, having won the 60 yards hurdles at the 1978 and 1979 AIAW Indoor Track and Field Championships during the meet's de-facto championship status years.

== Postseason ==
=== AIAW ===
The Scarlet Knights have had 13 AIAW All-Americans finishing in the top six at the AIAW indoor or outdoor championships.

AIAW All-Americans
Championships	Name	Event	Place
1974 Outdoor	Charlotte Walker	220 yards	6th
1978 Indoor	Hazel Lucas	60 yards	4th
1978 Indoor	Cynthia Wuss	880 yards	3rd
1978 Indoor	Debra Deutsch	60 yards hurdles	1st
1978 Indoor	Julie Smithers	60 yards hurdles	2nd
1978 Outdoor	Donna O'Carroll	Javelin throw	3rd
1979 Indoor	Hazel Lucas	60 yards	5th
1979 Indoor	Debra Deutsch	60 yards hurdles	1st
1979 Indoor	Julie Smithers	60 yards hurdles	3rd
1980 Indoor	Denis Peynado	600 meters	5th
1980 Indoor	Debra Deutsch	60 yards hurdles	4th
1980 Indoor	Julie Smithers	60 yards hurdles	6th
1980 Outdoor	Debra Deutsch	100 meters hurdles	6th
1982 Indoor	Lori McCauley	440 yards	1st
1982 Indoor	Kathy Tisdale	4 × 440 yards relay	5th
1982 Indoor	Andrea Patterson	4 × 440 yards relay	5th
1982 Indoor	Terry Dembek	4 × 440 yards relay	5th
1982 Indoor	Lori McCauley	4 × 440 yards relay	5th
1982 Outdoor	Lori McCauley	400 meters	6th
1982 Outdoor	Lori McCauley	4 × 800 meters relay	4th
1982 Outdoor	Kathleen Tisdale	4 × 800 meters relay	4th
1982 Outdoor	Cheryl Coleman	4 × 800 meters relay	4th
1982 Outdoor	Terry Dembek	4 × 800 meters relay	4th
1982 Outdoor	Lori McCauley	Sprint medley relay	4th
1982 Outdoor	Andrea Patterson	Sprint medley relay	4th
1982 Outdoor	Terry Dembek	Sprint medley relay	4th
1982 Outdoor	Jeanne Taormina	Sprint medley relay	4th

=== NCAA ===
As of 2024, a total of 27 men and 7 women have achieved individual first-team All-American status at the Division I men's outdoor, women's outdoor, men's indoor, or women's indoor national championships (using the modern criteria of top-8 placing regardless of athlete nationality).

First team NCAA All-Americans
Team	Championships	Name	Event	Place	Ref.
Men's	1953 Outdoor	Walker Glassford	3000 meters	7th	
Men's	1967 Outdoor	Elijah Miller	High jump	4th	
Men's	1967 Outdoor	Dick Lotspeich	Hammer throw	8th	
Men's	1968 Outdoor	Pete Schuder	400 meters	7th	
Men's	1969 Outdoor	John Hanley	400 meters hurdles	6th	
Men's	1970 Indoor	Tom Ulan	400 meters	4th	
Men's	1970 Outdoor	Tom Ulan	400 meters	5th	
Men's	1971 Indoor	Tom Ulan	400 meters	1st	
Men's	1973 Outdoor	Bill Sieben	10,000 meters	7th	
Men's	1975 Indoor	Tom Howell	High jump	3rd	
Men's	1975 Outdoor	Ron Speirs	Mile run	5th	
Men's	1975 Outdoor	Mike Roche	3000 meters steeplechase	5th	
Men's	1977 Indoor	Chris Scotta Divetta	1000 meters	5th	
Men's	1980 Indoor	Brian Grimes	600 yards	3rd	
Men's	1981 Indoor	Eugene Norman	55 meters hurdles	6th	
Men's	1981 Indoor	Brian Gtimes	4 × 800 meters relay	1st	
Men's	1981 Indoor	Stan Belin	4 × 800 meters relay	1st	
Men's	1981 Indoor	Walter Kirkland	4 × 800 meters relay	1st	
Men's	1981 Indoor	James Westman	4 × 800 meters relay	1st	
Men's	1981 Outdoor	Eugene Norman	110 meters hurdles	7th	
Men's	1981 Outdoor	Elliott Quow	200 meters	5th	
Men's	1982 Outdoor	Eugene Norman	110 meters hurdles	3rd	
Men's	1983 Indoor	Eugene Norman	55 meters hurdles	5th	
Women's	1983 Indoor	Lori McCauley	600 yards	2nd	
Men's	1983 Outdoor	Elliott Quow	200 meters	1st	
Women's	1983 Outdoor	Lori McCauley	400 meters hurdles	4th	
Men's	1984 Indoor	Eugene Norman	55 meters hurdles	5th	
Men's	1984 Outdoor	Eugene Norman	110 meters hurdles	8th	
Men's	1985 Outdoor	Elliott Quow	200 meters	4th	
Men's	1987 Outdoor	Bob Amabile	Javelin throw	4th	
Women's	1992 Outdoor	Lisa Kohut	Javelin throw	5th	
Women's	1994 Outdoor	Jennifer Heggie	1500 meters	3rd	
Men's	1995 Outdoor	Balazs Koranyi	800 meters	3rd	
Men's	1996 Outdoor	Balazs Koranyi	800 meters	5th	
Men's	1996 Outdoor	Chris Sagnella	Javelin throw	6th	
Men's	1997 Indoor	Balazs Koranyi	800 meters	3rd	
Women's	2005 Indoor	Shameka Marshall	Long jump	4th	
Men's	2005 Outdoor	Sam Segond	Discus throw	6th	
Women's	2006 Indoor	Shameka Marshall	Long jump	2nd	
Men's	2010 Outdoor	Bruce Owens	200 meters	6th	
Men's	2013 Outdoor	James Plummer	Discus throw	5th	
Men's	2014 Indoor	Corey Crawford	Long jump	2nd	
Men's	2014 Outdoor	Corey Crawford	Long jump	7th	
Men's	2016 Indoor	Corey Crawford	Long jump	8th	
Men's	2016 Outdoor	Corey Crawford	Long jump	4th	
Women's	2016 Outdoor	Gabrielle Farquharson	Long jump	7th	
Men's	2017 Indoor	Jermaine Griffith	400 meters	7th	
Men's	2017 Outdoor	Chris Mirabelli	Javelin throw	8th	
Men's	2018 Outdoor	Rudy Winkler	Hammer throw	4th	
Women's	2019 Outdoor	Reanda Richards	400 meters hurdles	4th	
Men's	2022 Indoor	A'Nan Bridgett	Long jump	4th	
Men's	2022 Outdoor	A'Nan Bridgett	Long jump	6th	
Men's	2024 Indoor	Sincere Robinson	Long jump	6th	
Women's	2024 Indoor	Chloe Timberg	Pole vault	3rd	
Women's	2024 Outdoor	Chloe Timberg	Pole vault	1st	

== See also ==
- Category:Rutgers Scarlet Knights men's track and field athletes (9)
- Category:Rutgers Scarlet Knights women's track and field athletes (4)
