= UTEP Miners track and field =

American college track and field team

- University: University of Texas at El Paso
- Head coach: Francesca Green
- Conference: Mountain West
- Location: El Paso, Texas
- Outdoor track: Kidd Field
- Nickname: Miners
- Colors: Dark blue, orange, and silver accent

NCAA Indoor National Championships
- Men: 1974, 1975, 1976, 1978, 1980, 1981, 1982; Women: 1980 (AIAW)

NCAA Outdoor National Championships
- Men: 1975, 1978, 1979, 1980, 1981, 1982

The UTEP Miners track and field team is the track and field program that represents University of Texas at El Paso. The Miners compete in NCAA Division I as a member of the Mountain West Conference. The team is based in El Paso, Texas, at the Kidd Field.

The program is coached by Francesca Green. The track and field program officially encompasses four teams because the NCAA considers men's and women's indoor track and field and outdoor track and field as separate sports.

In 1986, the track and field and cross country teams were put on probation by the NCAA for three years due to violations in 1983 and 1984 under then-coach Larry Heidebrecht. As part of the probation, UTEP could not compete in NCAA championships for the 1986-87 and 1987-88 seasons, and the men's team also had to vacate its 1983 NCAA Division I Cross Country Championships team title. The restrictions were imposed due to $62,150 in cash payments being made to athletes for performances. During the probation period, athletes on the team had to request appeals to participate in competitions, and many left altogether.

== Postseason ==
=== AIAW ===
The Miners have had 11 AIAW All-Americans finishing in the top six at the AIAW indoor or outdoor championships.

AIAW All-Americans
Championships	Name	Event	Place
1977 Outdoor	Debbie Pearson Mitchell	1500 meters	3rd
1978 Indoor	Jennifer Smit	Shot put	1st
1978 Indoor	Ria Stalman	Shot put	5th
1978 Outdoor	Debbie Pearson Mitchell	1500 meters	2nd
1978 Outdoor	Jennifer Smit	Shot put	1st
1978 Outdoor	Ria Stalman	Discus throw	1st
1979 Indoor	Jeanine Brown	300 yards	2nd
1979 Indoor	Debbie Pearson Mitchell	Mile run	1st
1979 Indoor	Dannette Alford	4 × 220 yards relay	3rd
1979 Indoor	Jeanine Brown	4 × 220 yards relay	3rd
1979 Indoor	Esther Otieno	4 × 220 yards relay	3rd
1979 Indoor	Carrman Rivers	4 × 220 yards relay	3rd
1979 Indoor	Esther Otieno	4 × 440 yards relay	6th
1979 Indoor	Carrman Rivers	4 × 440 yards relay	6th
1979 Indoor	Bea Reese	4 × 440 yards relay	6th
1979 Indoor	Jeanine Brown	4 × 440 yards relay	6th
1979 Indoor	Esther Otieno	Long jump	1st
1979 Indoor	Jennifer Smit	Shot put	2nd
1979 Indoor	Betty Bogers	Shot put	4th
1979 Outdoor	Jeanine Brown	4 × 110 yards relay	5th
1979 Outdoor	Esther Otieno	4 × 110 yards relay	5th
1979 Outdoor	Bea Reese	4 × 110 yards relay	5th
1979 Outdoor	Carrman Rivers	4 × 110 yards relay	5th
1979 Outdoor	Esther Otieno	Long jump	3rd
1979 Outdoor	Jennifer Smit	Shot put	6th
1979 Outdoor	Betty Bogers	Discus throw	2nd
1980 Indoor	Carrman Rivers	60 meters	5th
1980 Indoor	Jeanine Brown	300 meters	5th
1980 Indoor	Jacqueline Richards	1000 meters	5th
1980 Indoor	Debbie Pearson Mitchell	2000 meters	1st
1980 Indoor	Carrman Rivers	4 × 440 yards relay	1st
1980 Indoor	Esther Otieno	4 × 440 yards relay	1st
1980 Indoor	Turus Van Amstel	4 × 440 yards relay	1st
1980 Indoor	Jeanine Brown	4 × 440 yards relay	1st
1980 Indoor	Leisa Biggers	Distance medley relay	2nd
1980 Indoor	Rochelle Collins	Distance medley relay	2nd
1980 Indoor	Debbie Pearson Mitchell	Distance medley relay	2nd
1980 Indoor	Jacqueline Richards	Distance medley relay	2nd
1980 Indoor	Jennifer Smit	Shot put	3rd
1980 Outdoor	Carrman Rivers	4 × 440 yards relay	3rd
1980 Outdoor	Esther Otieno	4 × 440 yards relay	3rd
1980 Outdoor	Truus Van Amstel	4 × 440 yards relay	3rd
1980 Outdoor	Jeanine Brown	4 × 440 yards relay	3rd
1980 Outdoor	Jennifer Smit	Shot put	4th
1980 Outdoor	Ria Stalman	Discus throw	2nd
1980 Outdoor	Betty Bogers	Discus throw	3rd
1981 Indoor	Charmaine Crooks	400 meters	3rd
1981 Indoor	Leisa Biggers	4 × 440 yards relay	5th
1981 Indoor	Bea Reese	4 × 440 yards relay	5th
1981 Indoor	Zenobia Haynes	4 × 440 yards relay	5th
1981 Indoor	Jeanine Brown	4 × 440 yards relay	5th
1981 Outdoor	Jeanine Brown	200 meters	5th
1981 Outdoor	Kim Turner	100 meters hurdles	4th
1981 Outdoor	Bea Reese	Sprint medley relay	5th
1981 Outdoor	Doreen Hayward	Sprint medley relay	5th
1981 Outdoor	Jeanine Brown	Sprint medley relay	5th
1981 Outdoor	Charmaine Crooks	Sprint medley relay	5th
1981 Outdoor	Esther Otieno	Long jump	4th
1982 Indoor	Charmaine Crooks	440 yards	3rd
1982 Indoor	Kim Turner	60 yards hurdles	2nd
1982 Indoor	Susanne Lorentzon	High jump	2nd

=== NCAA ===
As of August 2025, a total of 127 men and 39 women have achieved individual first-team All-American status for the team at the Division I men's outdoor, women's outdoor, men's indoor, or women's indoor national championships (using the modern criteria of top-8 placing regardless of athlete nationality).

First team NCAA All-Americans
Team	Championships	Name	Event	Place	Ref.
Men's	1968 Indoor	Kerry Pearce	3000 meters	3rd	
Men's	1968 Indoor	Bob Beamon	Long jump	1st	
Men's	1968 Indoor	Bob Beamon	Triple jump	1st	
Men's	1968 Outdoor	Danny Teague	800 meters	6th	
Men's	1968 Outdoor	Kerry Pearce	3000 meters steeplechase	1st	
Men's	1968 Outdoor	Kerry Pearce	5000 meters	3rd	
Men's	1969 Indoor	Danny Teague	600 yards	3rd	
Men's	1969 Indoor	Scott English	High jump	4th	
Men's	1969 Outdoor	Kerry Pearce	3000 meters steeplechase	6th	
Men's	1969 Outdoor	Paul Heglar	Pole vault	4th	
Men's	1970 Indoor	Paul Gibson	55 meters hurdles	3rd	
Men's	1970 Indoor	Rod Hill	4 × 800 meters relay	5th	
Men's	1970 Indoor	Greg Jones	4 × 800 meters relay	5th	
Men's	1970 Indoor	Ken Breen	4 × 800 meters relay	5th	
Men's	1970 Indoor	Kerry Ellison	4 × 800 meters relay	5th	
Men's	1970 Indoor	Larry Vanley	Triple jump	5th	
Men's	1970 Indoor	Vince Monari	Shot put	4th	
Men's	1970 Outdoor	Paul Gibson	110 meters hurdles	1st	
Men's	1970 Outdoor	Ron Rondeau	400 meters hurdles	5th	
Men's	1970 Outdoor	Kerry Pearce	10,000 meters	7th	
Men's	1970 Outdoor	Scott English	High jump	7th	
Men's	1970 Outdoor	Paul Heglar	Pole vault	3rd	
Men's	1970 Outdoor	Larry Vanley	Triple jump	5th	
Men's	1970 Outdoor	Fred Debernardi	Shot put	8th	
Men's	1970 Outdoor	Fred Debernardi	Discus throw	2nd	
Men's	1971 Indoor	Paul Gibson	55 meters hurdles	3rd	
Men's	1971 Indoor	Greg Jones	1000 meters	4th	
Men's	1971 Indoor	Rod Hill	4 × 800 meters relay	1st	
Men's	1971 Indoor	Peter Romero	4 × 800 meters relay	1st	
Men's	1971 Indoor	Fernando De La Cerda	4 × 800 meters relay	1st	
Men's	1971 Indoor	Kerry Ellison	4 × 800 meters relay	1st	
Men's	1971 Indoor	Scott English	High jump	5th	
Men's	1971 Indoor	Paul Heglar	Pole vault	4th	
Men's	1971 Indoor	Vince Monari	Shot put	2nd	
Men's	1971 Indoor	Fred Debernardi	Shot put	4th	
Men's	1971 Outdoor	Harrington Jackson	100 meters	1st	
Men's	1971 Outdoor	Paul Gibson	110 meters hurdles	7th	
Men's	1971 Outdoor	Greg Jones	800 meters	6th	
Men's	1971 Outdoor	Larry Vanley	Triple jump	6th	
Men's	1971 Outdoor	Fred Debernardi	Shot put	3rd	
Men's	1971 Outdoor	Vince Monari	Shot put	8th	
Men's	1971 Outdoor	Fred Debernardi	Discus throw	2nd	
Men's	1971 Outdoor	Vince Monari	Discus throw	7th	
Men's	1972 Indoor	Fred Debernardi	Shot put	2nd	
Men's	1972 Indoor	Hans Hoglund	Shot put	3rd	
Men's	1972 Indoor	Peter Farmer	Weight throw	5th	
Men's	1972 Outdoor	Errol Stewart	100 meters	3rd	
Men's	1972 Outdoor	Harrington Jackson	100 meters	6th	
Men's	1972 Outdoor	Ron Rondeau	400 meters hurdles	5th	
Men's	1972 Outdoor	Errol Stewart	4 × 100 meters relay	5th	
Men's	1972 Outdoor	Ron Rondeau	4 × 100 meters relay	5th	
Men's	1972 Outdoor	Harold Williams	4 × 100 meters relay	5th	
Men's	1972 Outdoor	Harrington Jackson	4 × 100 meters relay	5th	
Men's	1972 Outdoor	Bill Curnow	Pole vault	3rd	
Men's	1972 Outdoor	Fred Debernardi	Shot put	1st	
Men's	1972 Outdoor	Hans Hoglund	Shot put	5th	
Men's	1972 Outdoor	Fred Debernardi	Discus throw	1st	
Men's	1972 Outdoor	Peter Farmer	Hammer throw	3rd	
Men's	1972 Outdoor	Pryor Nunn	Hammer throw	7th	
Men's	1973 Indoor	Hollie Walton	Distance medley relay	4th	
Men's	1973 Indoor	Jesse Kemp	Distance medley relay	4th	
Men's	1973 Indoor	Fernando De La Cerda	Distance medley relay	4th	
Men's	1973 Indoor	Paul Pearson	Distance medley relay	4th	
Men's	1973 Indoor	Hans Hoglund	Shot put	1st	
Men's	1973 Indoor	Peter Farmer	Weight throw	2nd	
Men's	1973 Outdoor	Jesse Kemp	4 × 100 meters relay	4th	
Men's	1973 Outdoor	Chris Garpenborg	4 × 100 meters relay	4th	
Men's	1973 Outdoor	Rudy Reid	4 × 100 meters relay	4th	
Men's	1973 Outdoor	Darryl Marbury	4 × 100 meters relay	4th	
Men's	1973 Outdoor	Hans Hoglund	Shot put	1st	
Men's	1973 Outdoor	Peter Farmer	Hammer throw	2nd	
Men's	1974 Indoor	Hollie Walton	Distance medley relay	3rd	
Men's	1974 Indoor	Jesse Kemp	Distance medley relay	3rd	
Men's	1974 Indoor	Wilson Wiagwa	Distance medley relay	3rd	
Men's	1974 Indoor	Paul Pearson	Distance medley relay	3rd	
Men's	1974 Indoor	Larry Jessee	Pole vault	1st	
Men's	1974 Indoor	Hans Hoglund	Shot put	1st	
Men's	1974 Indoor	Peter Farmer	Weight throw	2nd	
Men's	1974 Outdoor	Chris Garpenborg	100 meters	8th	
Men's	1974 Outdoor	Wilson Waigwa	Mile run	2nd	
Men's	1974 Outdoor	Bob Wallace	10,000 meters	6th	
Men's	1974 Outdoor	Errol Stewart	4 × 100 meters relay	7th	
Men's	1974 Outdoor	Clifton Addison	4 × 100 meters relay	7th	
Men's	1974 Outdoor	Jesse Kemp	4 × 100 meters relay	7th	
Men's	1974 Outdoor	Chris Garpenborg	4 × 100 meters relay	7th	
Men's	1974 Outdoor	Hans Hoglund	Shot put	3rd	
Men's	1974 Outdoor	Peter Farmer	Hammer throw	1st	
Men's	1975 Indoor	Frank Munene	1000 meters	4th	
Men's	1975 Indoor	Wilson Waigwa	Mile run	2nd	
Men's	1975 Indoor	Greg Joy	High jump	1st	
Men's	1975 Indoor	Larry Jesse	Pole vault	2nd	
Men's	1975 Indoor	Arnold Grimes	Triple jump	1st	
Men's	1975 Indoor	Hans Hoglund	Shot put	1st	
Men's	1975 Indoor	Hans Almstrom	Shot put	4th	
Men's	1975 Indoor	Peter Farmer	Weight throw	1st	
Men's	1975 Outdoor	Wilson Waigwa	Mile run	3rd	
Men's	1975 Outdoor	Frank Munene	Mile run	8th	
Men's	1975 Outdoor	James Munyala	3000 meters steeplechase	1st	
Men's	1975 Outdoor	Kip Sirma	10,000 meters	5th	
Men's	1975 Outdoor	Bob Wallace	10,000 meters	7th	
Men's	1975 Outdoor	Larry Jessee	Pole vault	5th	
Men's	1975 Outdoor	Arnold Grimes	Triple jump	2nd	
Men's	1975 Outdoor	Hans Hoglund	Shot put	1st	
Men's	1975 Outdoor	Hans Almstrom	Shot put	2nd	
Men's	1975 Outdoor	Peter Farmer	Hammer throw	2nd	
Men's	1975 Outdoor	Emmit Berry	Hammer throw	6th	
Men's	1976 Indoor	Joe Gichongeri	Distance medley relay	1st	
Men's	1976 Indoor	Paul Njoroge	Distance medley relay	1st	
Men's	1976 Indoor	James Munyala	Distance medley relay	1st	
Men's	1976 Indoor	Wilson Waigwa	Distance medley relay	1st	
Men's	1976 Indoor	Tom Asare	Long jump	5th	
Men's	1976 Indoor	Arnold Grimes	Triple jump	1st	
Men's	1976 Indoor	Hans Almstrom	Shot put	2nd	
Men's	1976 Indoor	Emmitt Berry	Weight throw	1st	
Men's	1976 Outdoor	Wilson Waigwa	1500 meters	2nd	
Men's	1976 Outdoor	James Munyala	3000 meters steeplechase	1st	
Men's	1976 Outdoor	Kip Sirma	10,000 meters	4th	
Men's	1976 Outdoor	Sam Maritim	10,000 meters	5th	
Men's	1976 Outdoor	Greg Joy	High jump	3rd	
Men's	1976 Outdoor	Hans Almstrom	Shot put	3rd	
Men's	1976 Outdoor	Emmit Berry	Hammer throw	2nd	
Men's	1977 Indoor	Wilson Waigwa	Mile run	1st	
Men's	1977 Indoor	Fred Ongaga	Distance medley relay	1st	
Men's	1977 Indoor	Paul Njoroge	Distance medley relay	1st	
Men's	1977 Indoor	James Munyala	Distance medley relay	1st	
Men's	1977 Indoor	Frank Munene	Distance medley relay	1st	
Men's	1977 Indoor	Greg Joy	High jump	1st	
Men's	1977 Indoor	Arnold Grimes	Triple jump	2nd	
Men's	1977 Indoor	Emmitt Berry	Weight throw	3rd	
Men's	1977 Outdoor	Wilson Waigwa	1500 meters	1st	
Men's	1977 Outdoor	James Munyala	3000 meters steeplechase	1st	
Men's	1977 Outdoor	Kip Sirma	10,000 meters	3rd	
Men's	1977 Outdoor	Greg Joy	High jump	4th	
Men's	1977 Outdoor	Arnold Grimes	Triple jump	5th	
Men's	1977 Outdoor	Svein Valvik	Discus throw	1st	
Men's	1977 Outdoor	Emmit Berry	Hammer throw	2nd	
Men's	1978 Indoor	Peter Lemashon	800 meters	5th	
Men's	1978 Indoor	James Munyala	Mile run	1st	
Men's	1978 Indoor	Rodolpho Gomez	5000 meters	2nd	
Men's	1978 Indoor	Michael Musyoki	5000 meters	3rd	
Men's	1978 Indoor	Kip Sirma	5000 meters	5th	
Men's	1978 Indoor	Jerome Hutchins	Triple jump	3rd	
Men's	1978 Indoor	Hans Almstrom	Shot put	2nd	
Men's	1978 Outdoor	Jerome Deal	100 meters	8th	
Men's	1978 Outdoor	Peter Lemashon	800 meters	1st	
Men's	1978 Outdoor	James Munyala	3000 meters steeplechase	2nd	
Men's	1978 Outdoor	Michael Musyoki	10,000 meters	1st	
Men's	1978 Outdoor	Kip Sirma	10,000 meters	7th	
Men's	1978 Outdoor	Svein Valvik	Discus throw	2nd	
Men's	1978 Outdoor	Emmit Berry	Hammer throw	2nd	
Men's	1978 Outdoor	Thommie Sjoholm	Hammer throw	3rd	
Men's	1979 Indoor	Jerome Deal	55 meters	4th	
Men's	1979 Indoor	Peter Lemashon	800 meters	2nd	
Men's	1979 Indoor	Suleiman Nyambui	Mile run	1st	
Men's	1979 Indoor	Suleiman Nyambui	3000 meters	1st	
Men's	1979 Indoor	Michael Musyoki	5000 meters	1st	
Men's	1979 Indoor	Keith Connor	Triple jump	3rd	
Men's	1979 Indoor	Tim Scott	Shot put	5th	
Men's	1979 Indoor	Richard Olsen	Weight throw	5th	
Men's	1979 Outdoor	Jerome Deal	100 meters	1st	
Men's	1979 Outdoor	Peter Lemashon	800 meters	5th	
Men's	1979 Outdoor	James Rotich	5000 meters	4th	
Men's	1979 Outdoor	Suleiman Nyambui	10,000 meters	1st	
Men's	1979 Outdoor	Michael Musyoki	10,000 meters	2nd	
Men's	1979 Outdoor	Hans Almstrom	Shot put	2nd	
Men's	1979 Outdoor	Svein Valvik	Discus throw	2nd	
Men's	1979 Outdoor	Richard Olsen	Hammer throw	2nd	
Men's	1979 Outdoor	Thommie Sjoholm	Hammer throw	3rd	
Men's	1980 Indoor	Jerome Deal	55 meters	2nd	
Men's	1980 Indoor	Bert Cameron	400 meters	1st	
Men's	1980 Indoor	George Mehale	600 yards	2nd	
Men's	1980 Indoor	Peter Lemashon	800 meters	3rd	
Men's	1980 Indoor	Suleiman Nyambui	Mile run	1st	
Men's	1980 Indoor	Suleiman Nyambui	3000 meters	1st	
Men's	1980 Indoor	Michael Musyoki	5000 meters	2nd	
Men's	1980 Indoor	Gabriel Kamau	5000 meters	6th	
Men's	1980 Indoor	Reuben Rathedi	4 × 800 meters relay	5th	
Men's	1980 Indoor	Yukon Tomisato	4 × 800 meters relay	5th	
Men's	1980 Indoor	Wybo Lelieveld	4 × 800 meters relay	5th	
Men's	1980 Indoor	Jan Boogman	4 × 800 meters relay	5th	
Men's	1980 Indoor	Steve Hanna	Triple jump	4th	
Men's	1980 Indoor	Joe Laniyan	Triple jump	5th	
Men's	1980 Indoor	Thommie Sjoholm	Weight throw	2nd	
Men's	1980 Outdoor	Jerome Deal	100 meters	6th	
Men's	1980 Outdoor	Bert Cameron	400 meters	1st	
Men's	1980 Outdoor	Wilfred Mulli	400 meters hurdles	2nd	
Men's	1980 Outdoor	Peter Lemashon	800 meters	5th	
Men's	1980 Outdoor	Suleiman Nyambui	5000 meters	1st	
Men's	1980 Outdoor	James Rotich	5000 meters	7th	
Men's	1980 Outdoor	Suleiman Nyambui	10,000 meters	1st	
Men's	1980 Outdoor	Steve Hanna	Triple jump	1st	
Men's	1980 Outdoor	Carlos Scott	Discus throw	2nd	
Men's	1980 Outdoor	Thommie Sjoholm	Hammer throw	1st	
Men's	1981 Indoor	Bert Cameron	400 meters	1st	
Men's	1981 Indoor	Peter Lemashon	1000 meters	1st	
Men's	1981 Indoor	Suleiman Nyambui	Mile run	1st	
Men's	1981 Indoor	Suleiman Nyambui	3000 meters	2nd	
Men's	1981 Indoor	Michael Musyoki	5000 meters	1st	
Men's	1981 Indoor	Matthews Motshwarateu	5000 meters	2nd	
Men's	1981 Indoor	Reuben Rathedi	4 × 800 meters relay	2nd	
Men's	1981 Indoor	Wilfred Mulli	4 × 800 meters relay	2nd	
Men's	1981 Indoor	George Mehale	4 × 800 meters relay	2nd	
Men's	1981 Indoor	Jan Boogman	4 × 800 meters relay	2nd	
Men's	1981 Indoor	Milton Ottey	High jump	2nd	
Men's	1981 Indoor	Thommie Sjoholm	Weight throw	4th	
Men's	1981 Outdoor	Bert Cameron	400 meters	1st	
Men's	1981 Outdoor	Peter Lemashon	800 meters	5th	
Men's	1981 Outdoor	Suleiman Nyambui	5000 meters	1st	
Men's	1981 Outdoor	Michael Musyoki	5000 meters	3rd	
Men's	1981 Outdoor	Matthews Motshwarateu	5000 meters	8th	
Men's	1981 Outdoor	Suleiman Nyambui	10,000 meters	1st	
Men's	1981 Outdoor	Michael Musyoki	10,000 meters	2nd	
Men's	1981 Outdoor	Matthews Motshwarateu	10,000 meters	3rd	
Men's	1981 Outdoor	Gidamis Shahanga	10,000 meters	5th	
Men's	1981 Outdoor	Milton Ottey	High jump	2nd	
Men's	1981 Outdoor	Steve Hanna	Triple jump	1st	
Men's	1981 Outdoor	Thommie Sjoholm	Hammer throw	6th	
Men's	1982 Indoor	Fabian Whymns	55 meters	5th	
Men's	1982 Indoor	Bert Cameron	400 meters	3rd	
Men's	1982 Indoor	George Mehale	800 meters	2nd	
Men's	1982 Indoor	Suleiman Nyambui	Mile run	1st	
Men's	1982 Indoor	Suleiman Nyambui	3000 meters	1st	
Men's	1982 Indoor	Gidamis Shahanga	3000 meters	4th	
Men's	1982 Indoor	Gabriel Kamau	5000 meters	1st	
Men's	1982 Indoor	Milton Ottey	High jump	2nd	
Men's	1982 Indoor	Tore Johnsen	Weight throw	1st	
Men's	1982 Outdoor	Bert Cameron	400 meters	2nd	
Men's	1982 Outdoor	Sam Ngatia	3000 meters steeplechase	5th	
Men's	1982 Outdoor	Suleiman Nyambui	5000 meters	1st	
Men's	1982 Outdoor	Gidamis Shahanga	5000 meters	7th	
Men's	1982 Outdoor	Suleiman Nyambui	10,000 meters	1st	
Men's	1982 Outdoor	Gidamis Shahanga	10,000 meters	2nd	
Men's	1982 Outdoor	Zack Barie	10,000 meters	5th	
Men's	1982 Outdoor	Milton Ottey	High jump	1st	
Men's	1982 Outdoor	Carlos Scott	Discus throw	3rd	
Women's	1982 Outdoor	Kim Turner	100 meters hurdles	3rd	
Women's	1982 Outdoor	Charmaine Crooks	400 meters	2nd	
Women's	1982 Outdoor	Bea Reese	4 × 100 meters relay	7th	
Women's	1982 Outdoor	Dorene Hayward	4 × 100 meters relay	7th	
Women's	1982 Outdoor	Kim Turner	4 × 100 meters relay	7th	
Women's	1982 Outdoor	Jeanine Warren	4 × 100 meters relay	7th	
Women's	1982 Outdoor	Susanne Lorentzon	High jump	3rd	
Women's	1982 Outdoor	Jennifer Smit	Shot put	5th	
Men's	1983 Indoor	Gidamis Shahanga	3000 meters	2nd	
Men's	1983 Indoor	Tore Johnsen	Weight throw	2nd	
Women's	1983 Indoor	Kim Turner	55 meters hurdles	3rd	
Women's	1983 Indoor	Charmaine Crooks	400 meters	2nd	
Women's	1983 Indoor	Linda McCurdy	High jump	6th	
Men's	1983 Outdoor	Bert Cameron	400 meters	1st	
Men's	1983 Outdoor	Gidamis Shahanga	5000 meters	1st	
Men's	1983 Outdoor	Zack Barie	5000 meters	2nd	
Men's	1983 Outdoor	Gidamis Shahanga	10,000 meters	1st	
Men's	1983 Outdoor	Zack Barie	10,000 meters	2nd	
Men's	1983 Outdoor	Tore Johnsen	Hammer throw	6th	
Women's	1983 Outdoor	Kim Turner	100 meters hurdles	2nd	
Men's	1984 Indoor	Milton Ottey	High jump	4th	
Men's	1984 Indoor	David Puvoget	High jump	6th	
Men's	1984 Indoor	Tore Johnsen	Weight throw	1st	
Women's	1984 Indoor	Cynthia Henry	Long jump	5th	
Men's	1984 Outdoor	Gidamis Shahanga	10,000 meters	8th	
Men's	1984 Outdoor	Norbert Elliott	Triple jump	4th	
Men's	1984 Outdoor	Tore Johnsen	Hammer throw	5th	
Women's	1984 Outdoor	Kim Turner	100 meters hurdles	1st	
Women's	1984 Outdoor	Charmaine Crooks	400 meters	2nd	
Men's	1985 Indoor	Michael Lawson	500 meters	6th	
Men's	1985 Indoor	Norbert Elliott	Triple jump	2nd	
Men's	1985 Indoor	Tore Johnsen	Weight throw	1st	
Men's	1985 Outdoor	Dale Laverty	400 meters hurdles	6th	
Men's	1985 Outdoor	Bernard Williams	400 meters hurdles	7th	
Men's	1985 Outdoor	Olav Jenssen	Discus throw	4th	
Men's	1985 Outdoor	Tore Johnsen	Hammer throw	7th	
Men's	1985 Outdoor	Anders Oberg	Decathlon	6th	
Men's	1986 Indoor	Chris Leeuwenbrugh	Pole vault	6th	
Men's	1986 Indoor	Frans Maas	Long jump	5th	
Women's	1986 Indoor	Cynthia Henry	Long jump	1st	
Men's	1986 Outdoor	Dale Laverty	400 meters hurdles	7th	
Men's	1986 Outdoor	Alfredo Shahanga	10,000 meters	3rd	
Men's	1986 Outdoor	Chris Leeuwenburgh	Pole vault	6th	
Men's	1986 Outdoor	Olav Jenssen	Discus throw	1st	
Men's	1986 Outdoor	Staffan Blomstrand	Decathlon	5th	
Women's	1986 Outdoor	Tina Ljungberg	3000 meters	5th	
Women's	1986 Outdoor	Lisbeth Brax	3000 meters	6th	
Women's	1986 Outdoor	Cynthia Henry	Long jump	1st	
Women's	1988 Outdoor	Rita Delnoye	3000 meters	4th	
Women's	1988 Outdoor	Lisbeth Brax	3000 meters	5th	
Women's	1988 Outdoor	Tina Ljungberg	5000 meters	3rd	
Women's	1989 Indoor	Wilma Vanonna	3000 meters	2nd	
Women's	1989 Indoor	Rita Delnoye	3000 meters	5th	
Men's	1989 Outdoor	Olapade Adeniken	100 meters	7th	
Men's	1989 Outdoor	Olapade Adeniken	200 meters	4th	
Men's	1989 Outdoor	Tim Kamili	1500 meters	5th	
Women's	1989 Outdoor	Tina Ljungberg	5000 meters	2nd	
Women's	1989 Outdoor	Wilma van Onna	5000 meters	6th	
Men's	1990 Indoor	Olapade Adeniken	55 meters	3rd	
Men's	1990 Indoor	Olapade Adeniken	200 meters	2nd	
Men's	1990 Indoor	Frank Wiegman	Mile run	6th	
Women's	1990 Indoor	Wilma van Onna	3000 meters	6th	
Men's	1990 Outdoor	Olapade Adeniken	100 meters	4th	
Men's	1990 Outdoor	Olapade Adeniken	200 meters	3rd	
Men's	1990 Outdoor	Harvey Noyola	4 × 100 meters relay	8th	
Men's	1990 Outdoor	Olapade Adeniken	4 × 100 meters relay	8th	
Men's	1990 Outdoor	Tony Bloom	4 × 100 meters relay	8th	
Men's	1990 Outdoor	Kevin Caldwell	4 × 100 meters relay	8th	
Women's	1990 Outdoor	Wilma van Onna	3000 meters	4th	
Men's	1991 Indoor	Olapade Adeniken	200 meters	6th	
Women's	1991 Indoor	Satu Levela	3000 meters	5th	
Men's	1991 Outdoor	Olapade Adeniken	100 meters	3rd	
Men's	1991 Outdoor	Olapade Adeniken	200 meters	2nd	
Men's	1992 Indoor	Olapade Adeniken	55 meters	3rd	
Men's	1992 Indoor	Olapade Adeniken	200 meters	4th	
Men's	1992 Indoor	Marcel Laros	Mile run	3rd	
Men's	1992 Indoor	Mika Laaksonen	Weight throw	1st	
Women's	1992 Indoor	Katarina Sederholm	Shot put	6th	
Men's	1992 Outdoor	Olapade Adeniken	100 meters	1st	
Men's	1992 Outdoor	Olapade Adeniken	200 meters	1st	
Men's	1992 Outdoor	Marcel Laros	1500 meters	7th	
Men's	1992 Outdoor	Jim Svenoy	3000 meters steeplechase	7th	
Men's	1992 Outdoor	Kjell Hauge	Shot put	8th	
Men's	1992 Outdoor	Mika Laaksonen	Hammer throw	1st	
Women's	1992 Outdoor	Katarina Sederholm	Shot put	6th	
Men's	1993 Indoor	Andrew Tynes	200 meters	2nd	
Men's	1993 Indoor	Marcel Laros	Mile run	4th	
Men's	1993 Indoor	Marko Wahlman	Weight throw	1st	
Men's	1993 Outdoor	Andrew Tynes	200 meters	6th	
Men's	1993 Outdoor	Marcel Laros	1500 meters	6th	
Men's	1993 Outdoor	Jim Svenoy	3000 meters steeplechase	2nd	
Men's	1993 Outdoor	Kjell Hauge	Discus throw	8th	
Men's	1993 Outdoor	Mika Laaksonen	Hammer throw	2nd	
Men's	1993 Outdoor	Marko Wahlman	Hammer throw	3rd	
Men's	1993 Outdoor	Alex Papadimitriou	Hammer throw	8th	
Women's	1993 Outdoor	Vibeke Tegneby	1500 meters	8th	
Men's	1994 Indoor	Obadele Thompson	55 meters	7th	
Men's	1994 Indoor	Andrew Tynes	200 meters	2nd	
Men's	1994 Indoor	Obadele Thompson	200 meters	4th	
Men's	1994 Indoor	Milton Mallard	400 meters	3rd	
Men's	1994 Indoor	Jim Svenoy	3000 meters	2nd	
Men's	1994 Indoor	Alex Papadimitriou	Weight throw	3rd	
Men's	1994 Outdoor	Andrew Tynes	200 meters	1st	
Men's	1994 Outdoor	Jim Svenoy	3000 meters steeplechase	1st	
Men's	1994 Outdoor	Richard Price	4 × 100 meters relay	4th	
Men's	1994 Outdoor	Andrew Tynes	4 × 100 meters relay	4th	
Men's	1994 Outdoor	Milton Mallard	4 × 100 meters relay	4th	
Men's	1994 Outdoor	Obadele Thompson	4 × 100 meters relay	4th	
Men's	1994 Outdoor	Obadele Thompson	4 × 400 meters relay	5th	
Men's	1994 Outdoor	Hayden Stephen	4 × 400 meters relay	5th	
Men's	1994 Outdoor	Andrew Tynes	4 × 400 meters relay	5th	
Men's	1994 Outdoor	Milton Mallard	4 × 400 meters relay	5th	
Men's	1994 Outdoor	Kjell Hauge	Shot put	2nd	
Men's	1994 Outdoor	Alex Papadimitriou	Hammer throw	2nd	
Women's	1994 Outdoor	Melinda Sergent	100 meters	8th	
Women's	1994 Outdoor	Terhi Palovuori	Javelin throw	6th	
Men's	1995 Indoor	Obadele Thompson	55 meters	3rd	
Men's	1995 Indoor	Alex Papadimitriou	Weight throw	1st	
Women's	1995 Indoor	Melinda Sergent	55 meters	1st	
Women's	1995 Indoor	Melinda Sergent	200 meters	5th	
Men's	1995 Outdoor	Obadele Thompson	100 meters	4th	
Men's	1995 Outdoor	Jim Svenoy	3000 meters steeplechase	1st	
Men's	1995 Outdoor	Alex Papadimitriou	Hammer throw	2nd	
Men's	1995 Outdoor	Lasse Paananen	Javelin throw	8th	
Men's	1996 Indoor	Obadele Thompson	55 meters	2nd	
Men's	1996 Indoor	Obadele Thompson	200 meters	1st	
Men's	1996 Indoor	Harri Vahavihu	Weight throw	3rd	
Men's	1996 Outdoor	William Porter	400 meters hurdles	3rd	
Men's	1996 Outdoor	Damian Kallabis	3000 meters steeplechase	6th	
Men's	1996 Outdoor	Tero Tallinen	Hammer throw	6th	
Women's	1996 Outdoor	Melinda Sergent	100 meters	6th	
Women's	1996 Outdoor	Kirsi Hasu	Javelin throw	3rd	
Women's	1996 Outdoor	Terhi Palovuori	Javelin throw	5th	
Men's	1997 Indoor	Obadele Thompson	200 meters	1st	
Men's	1997 Indoor	Harri Vahavihu	Weight throw	8th	
Women's	1997 Indoor	Jeanette Castro	800 meters	6th	
Men's	1997 Outdoor	Obadele Thompson	100 meters	1st	
Men's	1997 Outdoor	Obadele Thompson	200 meters	1st	
Men's	1997 Outdoor	Damian Kallabis	3000 meters steeplechase	4th	
Men's	1997 Outdoor	Ilmari Verho	Hammer throw	6th	
Women's	1997 Outdoor	Saidat Onanuga	400 meters hurdles	3rd	
Women's	1997 Outdoor	Jeanette Castro	800 meters	3rd	
Men's	1998 Indoor	Ronald Promesse	55 meters	5th	
Women's	1998 Indoor	Saidat Onanuga	400 meters	4th	
Women's	1998 Indoor	Alexandra Knoke	Distance medley relay	5th	
Women's	1998 Indoor	Saidat Onanuga	Distance medley relay	5th	
Women's	1998 Indoor	Jeanette Castro	Distance medley relay	5th	
Women's	1998 Indoor	Margit Kleis	Distance medley relay	5th	
Men's	1998 Outdoor	Marten Ejdervall	Hammer throw	7th	
Women's	1998 Outdoor	Saidat Onanuga	400 meters hurdles	4th	
Women's	1998 Outdoor	Jeanette Castro	800 meters	7th	
Women's	1999 Indoor	Saidat Onanuga	400 meters	3rd	
Men's	1999 Outdoor	Carlos Suarez	3000 meters steeplechase	2nd	
Men's	1999 Outdoor	Ronald Promesse	4 × 100 meters relay	7th	
Men's	1999 Outdoor	Caimin Douglas	4 × 100 meters relay	7th	
Men's	1999 Outdoor	Lee Mays	4 × 100 meters relay	7th	
Men's	1999 Outdoor	Wayne Johnson	4 × 100 meters relay	7th	
Men's	1999 Outdoor	Tepa Reinikainen	Shot put	7th	
Men's	1999 Outdoor	Ilmari Verho	Hammer throw	6th	
Men's	1999 Outdoor	Matti Narhi	Javelin throw	1st	
Women's	1999 Outdoor	Saidat Onanuga	400 meters hurdles	5th	
Women's	2000 Indoor	Saidat Onanuga	400 meters	7th	
Women's	2000 Indoor	Svetlana Badrankova	800 meters	2nd	
Women's	2000 Indoor	Barbara Pejic	4 × 400 meters relay	5th	
Women's	2000 Indoor	Saidat Onanuga	4 × 400 meters relay	5th	
Women's	2000 Indoor	Jose Van der Veen	4 × 400 meters relay	5th	
Women's	2000 Indoor	Svetlana Badrankova	4 × 400 meters relay	5th	
Men's	2000 Outdoor	Janne Vartia	Hammer throw	3rd	
Men's	2000 Outdoor	Mats Nilsson	Javelin throw	4th	
Women's	2000 Outdoor	Saidat Onanuga	400 meters hurdles	6th	
Women's	2000 Outdoor	Anna Tarasova	Triple jump	8th	
Women's	2000 Outdoor	Angeliki Tsiolakoudi	Javelin throw	1st	
Men's	2001 Indoor	Bashar Ibrahim	Mile run	5th	
Women's	2001 Indoor	Svetlana Badrankova	800 meters	1st	
Women's	2001 Indoor	Lucy Ann Richards	4 × 400 meters relay	4th	
Women's	2001 Indoor	Margaret Ike	4 × 400 meters relay	4th	
Women's	2001 Indoor	Jose Van der Veen	4 × 400 meters relay	4th	
Women's	2001 Indoor	Svetlana Badrankova	4 × 400 meters relay	4th	
Women's	2001 Indoor	Anna Tarasova	Triple jump	3rd	
Men's	2001 Outdoor	Caimin Douglas	200 meters	2nd	
Men's	2001 Outdoor	Carlos Suarez	3000 meters steeplechase	6th	
Men's	2001 Outdoor	Taiwo Ajibade	4 × 100 meters relay	3rd	
Men's	2001 Outdoor	Caimin Douglas	4 × 100 meters relay	3rd	
Men's	2001 Outdoor	Jermaine Joseph	4 × 100 meters relay	3rd	
Men's	2001 Outdoor	Aaron Egbele	4 × 100 meters relay	3rd	
Men's	2001 Outdoor	Janne Vartia	Hammer throw	4th	
Men's	2001 Outdoor	Vesa Jappinen	Javelin throw	2nd	
Women's	2001 Outdoor	Svetlana Badrankova	800 meters	3rd	
Women's	2001 Outdoor	Anna Tarasova	Triple jump	4th	
Women's	2001 Outdoor	Anne-Laure Gremillet	Hammer throw	8th	
Men's	2002 Indoor	Aaron Egbele	200 meters	5th	
Men's	2002 Indoor	Adrian Ghioroaie	Triple jump	3rd	
Men's	2002 Outdoor	Aaron Egbele	100 meters	6th	
Men's	2002 Outdoor	Aaron Egbele	200 meters	4th	
Men's	2002 Outdoor	Bashar Ibrahim	3000 meters steeplechase	4th	
Men's	2002 Outdoor	Janne Vartia	Hammer throw	6th	
Men's	2002 Outdoor	Janne Sakko	Javelin throw	5th	
Men's	2003 Indoor	Henderson Dottin	High jump	6th	
Men's	2003 Outdoor	Bashar Ibrahim	3000 meters steeplechase	3rd	
Men's	2003 Outdoor	Janne Vartia	Hammer throw	4th	
Men's	2003 Outdoor	Janne Sakko	Javelin throw	8th	
Women's	2003 Outdoor	Desiree Crichlow	High jump	4th	
Men's	2004 Indoor	Henderson Dottin	High jump	4th	
Men's	2004 Outdoor	Henderson Dottin	High jump	5th	
Men's	2005 Indoor	Mickael Hanany	High jump	5th	
Women's	2005 Indoor	Adriana Pirtea	3000 meters	2nd	
Men's	2005 Outdoor	Mircea Bogdan	3000 meters steeplechase	1st	
Men's	2005 Outdoor	Patrick Mutai	3000 meters steeplechase	5th	
Men's	2005 Outdoor	Mickael Hanany	High jump	2nd	
Men's	2006 Indoor	Daniel Ward	200 meters	8th	
Men's	2006 Indoor	Dominic Tanui	800 meters	3rd	
Men's	2006 Indoor	Elias Koech	800 meters	7th	
Men's	2006 Indoor	Mickael Hanany	High jump	4th	
Women's	2006 Indoor	Jenny Holmroos	800 meters	5th	
Men's	2006 Outdoor	Churandy Martina	100 meters	6th	
Men's	2006 Outdoor	Churandy Martina	200 meters	4th	
Men's	2006 Outdoor	Mircea Bogdan	3000 meters steeplechase	2nd	
Men's	2006 Outdoor	Patrick Mutai	3000 meters steeplechase	8th	
Men's	2006 Outdoor	Yinka Bello	4 × 100 meters relay	3rd	
Men's	2006 Outdoor	Daniel Ward	4 × 100 meters relay	3rd	
Men's	2006 Outdoor	John Alpio	4 × 100 meters relay	3rd	
Men's	2006 Outdoor	Churandy Martina	4 × 100 meters relay	3rd	
Men's	2006 Outdoor	Mickael Hanany	High jump	6th	
Men's	2006 Outdoor	Mickael Hanany	Long jump	4th	
Women's	2006 Outdoor	Fatimoh Muhammed	800 meters	5th	
Women's	2006 Outdoor	Erma-Gene Evans	Javelin throw	6th	
Men's	2007 Indoor	Mickael Hanany	High jump	8th	
Women's	2007 Indoor	Fatimoh Muhammed	800 meters	8th	
Women's	2007 Indoor	Nelly Tchayem	Triple jump	5th	
Men's	2007 Outdoor	Elias Koech	800 meters	2nd	
Men's	2007 Outdoor	Stephen Samoei	10,000 meters	6th	
Women's	2007 Outdoor	Fatimoh Muhamed	800 meters	4th	
Women's	2007 Outdoor	Erma-Gene Evans	Javelin throw	2nd	
Women's	2008 Indoor	Blessing Okagbare	Long jump	2nd	
Women's	2008 Indoor	Blessing Okagbare	Triple jump	4th	
Women's	2008 Indoor	Nelly Tchayem	Triple jump	5th	
Men's	2008 Outdoor	Elias Koech	800 meters	5th	
Men's	2008 Outdoor	Patrick Mutai	3000 meters steeplechase	7th	
Men's	2008 Outdoor	Japeth Ng'Ojoy	10,000 meters	8th	
Men's	2008 Outdoor	Mickael Hanany	High jump	1st	
Men's	2008 Outdoor	Alex van der Merwe	Javelin throw	5th	
Women's	2008 Outdoor	Quashanda Welch	4 × 100 meters relay	6th	
Women's	2008 Outdoor	Halimat Ismaila	4 × 100 meters relay	6th	
Women's	2008 Outdoor	Shalaiyah Sommerville	4 × 100 meters relay	6th	
Women's	2008 Outdoor	Blessing Okagbare	4 × 100 meters relay	6th	
Women's	2008 Outdoor	Blessing Okagbare	Long jump	3rd	
Women's	2008 Outdoor	Blessing Okagbare	Triple jump	2nd	
Women's	2008 Outdoor	Nelly Tchayem	Triple jump	3rd	
Women's	2008 Outdoor	Keisha Walkes	Shot put	7th	
Men's	2009 Outdoor	Dimitrios Fylladitakis	Hammer throw	5th	
Men's	2009 Outdoor	Alex van der Merwe	Javelin throw	7th	
Women's	2009 Outdoor	Blessing Okagbare	Long jump	8th	
Women's	2009 Outdoor	Blessing Okagbare	Triple jump	5th	
Women's	2009 Outdoor	Anna Wessman	Javelin throw	3rd	
Women's	2010 Indoor	Blessing Okagbare	60 meters	1st	
Women's	2010 Indoor	Blessing Okagbare	Long jump	1st	
Men's	2010 Outdoor	Dimitrios Fylladitakis	Hammer throw	6th	
Women's	2010 Outdoor	Blessing Okagbare	100 meters	1st	
Women's	2010 Outdoor	Risper Kimaiyo	5000 meters	4th	
Women's	2010 Outdoor	Blessing Okagbare	Long jump	1st	
Women's	2010 Outdoor	Anna Wessman	Javelin throw	5th	
Women's	2011 Indoor	Endurance Abinuwa	400 meters	4th	
Women's	2011 Indoor	Risper Kimaiyo	5000 meters	7th	
Men's	2012 Outdoor	Anthony Rotich	3000 meters steeplechase	6th	
Men's	2013 Indoor	Anthony Rotich	5000 meters	6th	
Men's	2013 Outdoor	Anthony Rotich	3000 meters steeplechase	1st	
Women's	2013 Outdoor	Janice Jackson	100 meters hurdles	8th	
Women's	2013 Outdoor	Risper Kimaiyo	10,000 meters	8th	
Men's	2014 Indoor	Anthony Rotich	Mile run	1st	
Men's	2014 Indoor	Mark Jackson	Triple jump	2nd	
Women's	2014 Indoor	Janice Jackson	60 meters hurdles	5th	
Women's	2014 Indoor	Nickevea Wilson	Triple jump	8th	
Men's	2014 Outdoor	Anthony Rotich	3000 meters steeplechase	1st	
Men's	2015 Indoor	Anthony Rotich	Mile run	3rd	
Men's	2015 Outdoor	Anthony Rotich	3000 meters steeplechase	1st	
Men's	2016 Indoor	Jonah Koech	Mile run	6th	
Women's	2016 Outdoor	Tobi Amusan	100 meters hurdles	2nd	
Men's	2017 Indoor	Emmanuel Korir	800 meters	1st	
Women's	2017 Indoor	Tobi Amusan	60 meters hurdles	6th	
Men's	2017 Outdoor	Emmanuel Korir	800 meters	1st	
Men's	2017 Outdoor	Michael Saruni	800 meters	8th	
Women's	2017 Outdoor	Tobi Amusan	100 meters hurdles	1st	
Men's	2018 Indoor	Michael Saruni	800 meters	1st	
Men's	2018 Outdoor	Michael Saruni	800 meters	3rd	
Men's	2018 Outdoor	Jonah Koech	800 meters	6th	
Men's	2021 Outdoor	Paulo Benavides	Pole vault	7th	
Men's	2022 Outdoor	JeVaughn Powell	400 meters	7th	
Men's	2023 Outdoor	Victor Kibiego	3000 meters steeplechase	3rd	
Women's	2025 Indoor	Niesha Burgher	200 meters	6th	

== See also ==
- Category:UTEP Miners men's track and field athletes (71)
- Category:UTEP Miners women's track and field athletes (26)
