= San Diego State Aztecs track and field =

American college track and field team

- University: San Diego State University
- Head coach: Shelia Burrell
- Conference: Pac-12
- Location: San Diego, California
- Outdoor track: Aztrack at SDSU Sports Deck (Capacity: 3,000)
- Nickname: Aztecs
- Colors: Scarlet and black

NCAA Indoor Tournament Appearances
- Women: 2006, 2008, 2009, 2010, 2012, 2013, 2014, 2017, 2018, 2019; Men: N/A (top-8 only)

NCAA Outdoor Tournament Appearances
- Women: 1982, 1983, 1984, 1985, 1986, 1998, 1999, 2001, 2003, 2004, 2005, 2007, 2008, 2009, 2011, 2012, 2013, 2014, 2016, 2017, 2018, 2019; Men: 1934, 1935, 1947, 1948, 1949, 1950, 1951, 1952, 1954, 1965, 1966, 1969, 1970, 1971, 1974, 1976, 1977, 1979, 1980, 1982, 1983, 1984, 1989 (top-8 only)

Conference Outdoor Championships
- Women: 2002, 2003, 2013, 2014, 2017, 2018, 2021; Men: 1988

The San Diego State Aztecs track and field team is the track and field program that represents San Diego State University (SDSU). The Aztecs compete in NCAA Division I as a member of the Pac-12 Conference. The team is based at the Aztrack, part of the SDSU Sports Deck.

The track and field program officially encompasses four teams, as the NCAA regards men's and women's indoor track and field and outdoor track and field as separate sports.

In May 1992, athletic director Fred Miller announced that the men's track team as well as the men's and women's golf and wrestling teams would be cut for financial reasons. This left only a women's track and field team.

== Postseason ==
=== Indoor ===
San Diego State Aztecs women's track and field indoor NCAA championships finishes
Year	Competition	Finish
2006	Indoor	51st
2008	Indoor	33rd
2009	Indoor	34th
2010	Indoor	21st
2012	Indoor	48th
2013	Indoor	25th
2014	Indoor	19th
2017	Indoor	21st
2018	Indoor	17th
2019	Indoor	27th

=== Outdoor ===
San Diego State Aztecs women's track and field outdoor NCAA championships finishes
Year	Competition	Finish
1982	Outdoor	10th
1983	Outdoor	24th
1984	Outdoor	11th
1985	Outdoor	9th
1986	Outdoor	20th
1998	Outdoor	51st
1999	Outdoor	62nd
2001	Outdoor	37th
2003	Outdoor	29th
2004	Outdoor	27th
2005	Outdoor	29th
2007	Outdoor	46th
2008	Outdoor	31st
2009	Outdoor	25th
2011	Outdoor	60th
2012	Outdoor	9th
2013	Outdoor	23rd
2014	Outdoor	12th
2016	Outdoor	20th
2017	Outdoor	32nd
2018	Outdoor	46th
2019	Outdoor	32nd

San Diego State Aztecs men's track and field outdoor NCAA championships finishes
Year	Competition	Finish
1934	Outdoor	14th
1935	Outdoor	24th
1947	Outdoor	14th
1948	Outdoor	16th
1949	Outdoor	16th
1950	Outdoor	9th
1951	Outdoor	40th
1952	Outdoor	28th
1954	Outdoor	44th
1965	Outdoor	25th
1966	Outdoor	24th
1969	Outdoor	16th
1970	Outdoor	12th
1971	Outdoor	40th
1974	Outdoor	16th
1976	Outdoor	18th
1977	Outdoor	56th
1979	Outdoor	31st
1980	Outdoor	41st
1982	Outdoor	53rd
1983	Outdoor	74th
1984	Outdoor	71st
1989	Outdoor	68th

== NCAA individual event champions ==
Aztec women's track and field has had athletes win 7 NCAA individual national championships at the Division I level. The men's team won 8 NCAA individual national championships before it was disbanded.

NCAA individual championships
School year	Athlete(s)	Sport
1933–34	Jack Rand	Men's outdoor track and field (pole vault)
1946–47	Willie Steele	Men's outdoor track and field (long jump)
1947–48	Willie Steele	Men's outdoor track and field (long jump)
1948–49	Bobby Smith	Men's outdoor track and field (pole vault)
1949–50	Bobby Smith	Men's outdoor track and field (pole vault)
1964–65	Larry Godfrey	Men's outdoor track and field (400 m hurdles)
1969–70	Arnie Robinson	Men's outdoor track and field (long jump)
1975–76	Quentin Wheeler	Men's outdoor track and field (400 m hurdles)
1983–84	Ramona Pagel	Women's outdoor track and field
1984–85	Laura De Snoo	Women's outdoor track and field
1984–85	LaTanya Sheffield	Women's outdoor track and field
2011–12	Whitney Ashley	Women's outdoor track and field
2012–13	Shanieka Ricketts	Women's outdoor track and field
2013–14	Shanieka Ricketts	Women's indoor track and field
2013–14	Shanieka Ricketts	Women's outdoor track and field

== See also ==
- Aztec Hall of Fame
