= Hans Almström =

Swedish shot putter

Personal information
- Nationality: Swedish
- Born: 1 August 1950 (age 75) Tunaberg, Sweden

Sport
- Sport: Athletics
- Event: Shot put

Hans Almström (born 1 August 1950) is a Swedish athlete. He competed in the men's shot put at the 1976 Summer Olympics.

In 1977, Almström herniated his disc. He opted out of surgery and instead recovered through physical therapy, staying for one and a half months in a Swedish hospital. He was an All-American thrower for the UTEP Miners track and field team, finishing runner-up in the shot put at the 1975 NCAA Division I Outdoor Track and Field Championships, 1976 NCAA Indoor Track and Field Championships, 1978 NCAA Indoor Track and Field Championships, and 1979 NCAA Division I Outdoor Track and Field Championships.
