= 1980 AIAW Indoor Track and Field Championships =

- Dates: March 7–8, 1980
- Host city: Columbia, Missouri
- Venue: Hearnes Multipurpose Building
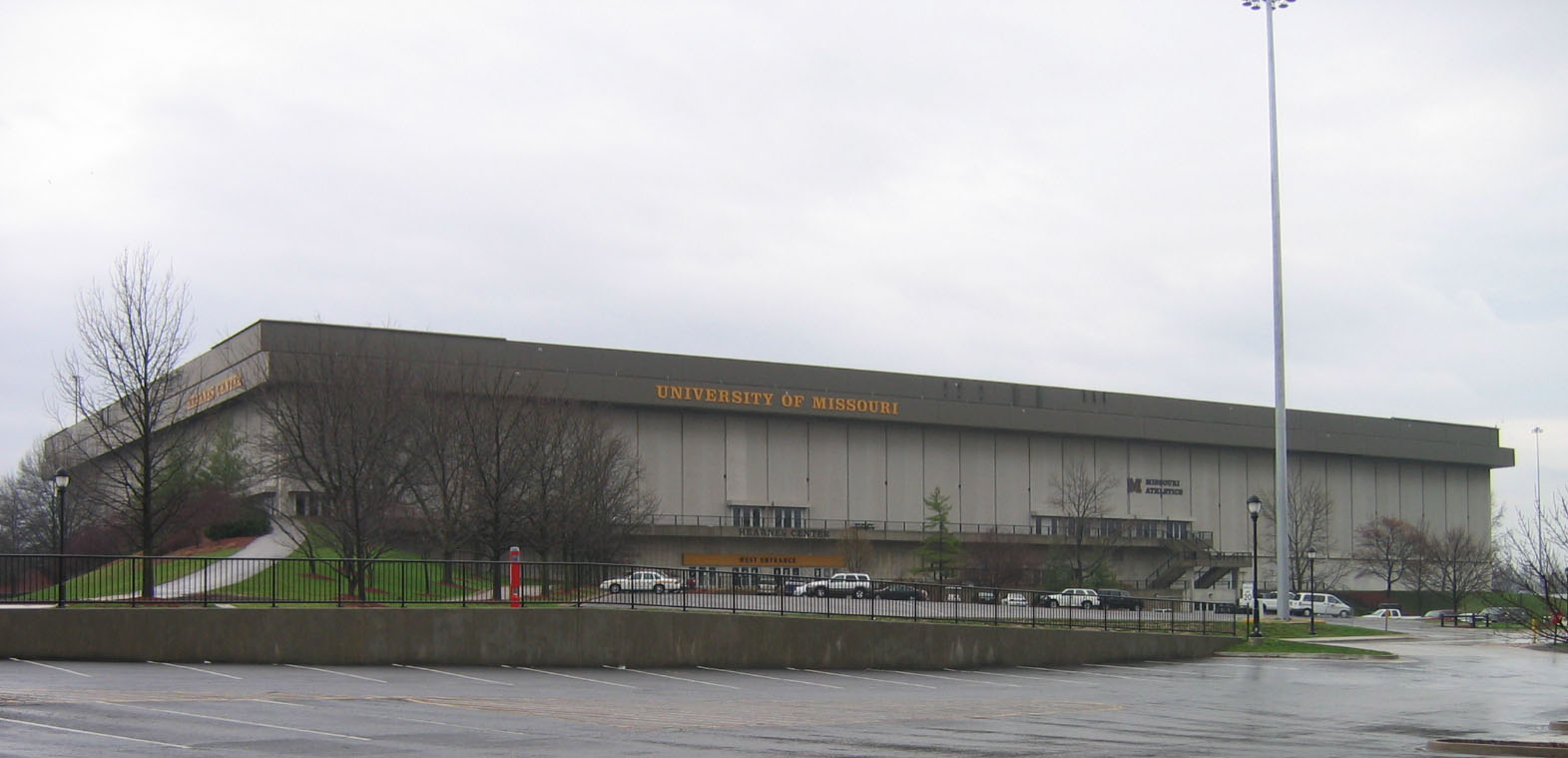

The 1980 AIAW Indoor Track And Field Championships were the first official Association for Intercollegiate Athletics for Women-sanctioned track meet to determine the individual and team national champions of women's collegiate indoor track and field events in the United States. They were contested March 7−8, 1980 in Columbia, Missouri at the Hearnes Multipurpose Building and won by the UTEP Miners track and field team.

Unlike most AIAW-sponsored sports, there were not separate Division I, II, and III championships for indoor track and field. Held for the first two years as an invitational, the meet gained its official national championship status in 1980; it was referred to as a "de facto" championship for the preceding years.

The meeting was criticized for not including the 1500 m or mile run events. The 600 m heats were actually held over a shorter distance of 564 meters due to mis-measuring the start and end points, making the times ineligible for records, though the finals were held over the correct distance. The original winner of the 4 × 440 yards relay Texas Woman's University was disqualified due to their runner Leleith Hodges wearing a T-shirt instead of the school jersey.

== Team standings ==
- Scoring: 10 points for a 1st-place finish, 8 points for 2nd, 6 points for 3rd, 4 points for 4th, 2 points for 5th, and 1 point for 6th. Top 10 teams shown.

Rank	Team	Points
1st place, gold medalist(s)	UTEP Miners	40
2nd place, silver medalist(s)	Wisconsin Badgers	25
3rd place, bronze medalist(s)	Georgetown Hoyas	24
3rd place, bronze medalist(s)	Nebraska Cornhuskers	24
5th	Morgan State Bears	22
6th	Maryland Terrapins	20
7th	BYU Cougars	18
7th	Texas Woman's Pioneers	18
9th	Florida Gators	17
10th	Missouri Tigers	16

== Results ==
- Only results of finals are shown

60 m
Pl.	Name	Team	Mark
1st place, gold medalist(s)	Leleith Hodges	Texas Woman's Pioneers	7.38
2nd place, silver medalist(s)	Maria Parsons	Morgan State Bears	7.50
3rd place, bronze medalist(s)	Lori Dowers	Delaware State Hornets	7.50
4th	Stephanie Hightower	Ohio State Buckeyes	7.51
5th	Carrman Rivers	UTEP Miners	7.52
6th	Merlene Ottey	Nebraska Cornhuskers	7.53
7th	Diane Williams	Michigan State Spartans	7.77
8th	Becky Jo Kaiser	Illinois Fighting Illini	7.78

300 m
Pl.	Name	Team	Mark
1st place, gold medalist(s)	Merlene Ottey	Nebraska Cornhuskers	37.13 WR
2nd place, silver medalist(s)	Ruth Simpson	Texas Woman's Pioneers	38.25
3rd place, bronze medalist(s)	Wanda Hooker	Memphis Tigers	38.56
4th	Maria Parsons	Morgan State Bears	38.59
5th	Jeanine Brown	UTEP Miners	38.68
6th	Beverly Kearney	Auburn Tigers	39.05
7th	Pam Moore	Wisconsin Badgers	39.32
8th	Cheryl Gilliam	Michigan State Spartans	39.37

600 m
Pl.	Name	Team	Mark
1st place, gold medalist(s)	Chris Mullen	Georgetown Hoyas	1:28.77 NR
2nd place, silver medalist(s)	Rosalyn Dunlap	Missouri Tigers	1:30.11
3rd place, bronze medalist(s)	Marie Dwyer	Indiana Hoosiers	1:30.15
4th	Diann Ousley	Arkansas Razorbacks	1:30.25
5th	Denis Peynado	Rutgers Scarlet Knights	1:31.38
6th	Laura Ferguson	Wyoming Cowgirls	1:32.74
	Jennie Gorham	Nebraska Cornhuskers	DNF
	Kim Thomas	St. John's Red Storm	DNC

1000 m
Pl.	Name	Team	Mark
1st place, gold medalist(s)	Chris Mullen	Georgetown Hoyas	2:43.83
2nd place, silver medalist(s)	Ileana Hocking	North Texas Mean Green	2:44.49
3rd place, bronze medalist(s)	Dana Glidden	Missouri Tigers	2:45.41
4th	Brigid Leddy	Villanova Wildcats	2:46.33
5th	Jacqueline Richards	UTEP Miners	2:47.05
6th	Rose Thomson	Wisconsin Badgers	2:47.93
7th	Marie Simonsson	Drake Bulldogs	2:48.4
8th	Patti Douglas	Rhode Island Rams	2:50.7

2000 m
Pl.	Name	Team	Mark
1st place, gold medalist(s)	Debbie Pearson Mitchell	UTEP Miners	6:04.79
2nd place, silver medalist(s)	Mary Rawe	Penn State Nittany Lions	6:05.67
3rd place, bronze medalist(s)	Suzie Houston	Wisconsin Badgers	6:06.13
4th	Michelle Brown	Kansas Jayhawks	6:08.56
5th	Eryn Forbes	Oregon Ducks	6:09.55
6th	Patsy Sharples	Idaho Vandals	6:10.94
7th	Rose Thomson	Wisconsin Badgers	6:13.9
8th	Lauri Adams	Montana State Bobcats	6:17.3

5000 m
Pl.	Name	Team	Mark
1st place, gold medalist(s)	Eileen Hornberger	West Chester Golden Rams	16:28.58
2nd place, silver medalist(s)	Donna Gathje	Minnesota State Mavericks	16:34.07
3rd place, bronze medalist(s)	Rocky Racette	Minnesota Golden Gophers	16:39.65
4th	Pia Palladina	Georgetown Hoyas	16:40.46
5th	Peggy Cleary	Penn State Nittany Lions	16:45.24
6th	Heather Carmichael	Penn State Nittany Lions	16:50.61
7th	Melanie Weaver	Michigan Wolverines	16:51.1
8th	Kelly Spatz	Michigan State Spartans	16:51.7
9th	Jill Molen	Utah Utes	16:55.7
10th	Brenda Saunders	Missouri Tigers	16:57.2
11th	Alanna McCarthy	Purdue Boilermakers	17:00.9
12th	Cynthia Wadsworth	Michigan State Spartans	17:04.4
13th	Barbara Sabitus	James Madison Dukes	17:05.0
14th	Carolyn Ihrig	Penn State Nittany Lions	17:07.3
15th	Lorie Scott	Texas A&M Aggies	17:10.4
16th	Mary Seybold	Iowa State Cyclones	17:15.9
17th	Cathy Saxon	Kansas State Wildcats	17:19.2
18th	Lisa Berry	Michigan Wolverines	17:21.6
19th	Sue Richardson	Michigan State Spartans	17:26.0
20th	Martha Stinson	Missouri Tigers	17:30.4
21st	Mary Walsh	Maryland Terrapins	17:31.6
22nd	Wendy Burman	Parkside Rangers	17:35.0
23rd	Sally Zook	Wisconsin Badgers	17:35.7
24th	Colleen Hillery	Auburn Tigers	17:37.9
25th	Ann Bischoff	Bucknell Bison	17:57.0

60 m hurdles
Pl.	Name	Team	Mark
1st place, gold medalist(s)	Stephanie Hightower	Ohio State Buckeyes	8.19
2nd place, silver medalist(s)	Sharon Colyear	Boston University Terriers	8.23
3rd place, bronze medalist(s)	Karen Wechsler	Indiana Hoosiers	8.46
4th	Debra Deutsch	Rutgers Scarlet Knights	8.48
5th	Pam Page	Missouri Tigers	8.62
6th	Julie Smithers	Rutgers Scarlet Knights	8.76
7th	Linda Bourn	BYU Cougars	8.80
8th	Kim Whitehead	Iowa State Cyclones	8.81

4 × 220 yards relay
Pl.	Name	Team	Mark
1st place, gold medalist(s)	Maria Parsons	Morgan State Bears	1:38.92
1st place, gold medalist(s)	Roberta Belle	Morgan State Bears	1:38.92
1st place, gold medalist(s)	Evalene Hatcher	Morgan State Bears	1:38.92
1st place, gold medalist(s)	Nellie Bullock	Morgan State Bears	1:38.92
2nd place, silver medalist(s)	Pat Dunlap	Florida Gators	1:39.92
2nd place, silver medalist(s)	Lorraine Ray	Florida Gators	1:39.92
2nd place, silver medalist(s)	Lori Lewis	Florida Gators	1:39.92
2nd place, silver medalist(s)	Pam Rodgers	Florida Gators	1:39.92
3rd place, bronze medalist(s)	Edna Brown	Temple Owls	1:40.88
3rd place, bronze medalist(s)	Amy Whicker	Temple Owls	1:40.88
3rd place, bronze medalist(s)	Lesvia Jackson	Temple Owls	1:40.88
3rd place, bronze medalist(s)	Gladys Boone	Temple Owls	1:40.88
4th	Amy Dunlop	Wisconsin Badgers	1:41.24
4th	Yvette Hyman	Wisconsin Badgers	1:41.24
4th	Pat Johnson	Wisconsin Badgers	1:41.24
4th	Pam Moore	Wisconsin Badgers	1:41.24
5th	Beverly Roman	Maryland Terrapins	1:41.37
5th	Leslie Palmer	Maryland Terrapins	1:41.37
5th	Linda Miller	Maryland Terrapins	1:41.37
5th	Leola Toomer	Maryland Terrapins	1:41.37
6th	Normalee Murray	Nebraska Cornhuskers	1:42.0
6th	Cindy Tatum	Nebraska Cornhuskers	1:42.0
6th	Jennie Gorham	Nebraska Cornhuskers	1:42.0
6th	Merlene Ottey	Nebraska Cornhuskers	1:42.0
7th		Auburn Tigers	1:42.5
		Texas Woman's Pioneers	DQ

4 × 440 yards relay
Pl.	Name	Team	Mark
1st place, gold medalist(s)	Carrman Rivers	UTEP Miners	3:44.99
1st place, gold medalist(s)	Esther Otieno	UTEP Miners	3:44.99
1st place, gold medalist(s)	Turus Van Amstel	UTEP Miners	3:44.99
1st place, gold medalist(s)	Jeanine Brown	UTEP Miners	3:44.99
2nd place, silver medalist(s)	Pat Dunlap	Florida Gators	3:45.21
2nd place, silver medalist(s)	Susan Seebers	Florida Gators	3:45.21
2nd place, silver medalist(s)	Lori Lewis	Florida Gators	3:45.21
2nd place, silver medalist(s)	Pam Rodgers	Florida Gators	3:45.21
3rd place, bronze medalist(s)	Debra Pinnix	North Texas Mean Green	3:45.29
3rd place, bronze medalist(s)	Joan Bennett	North Texas Mean Green	3:45.29
3rd place, bronze medalist(s)	Ileana Hocking	North Texas Mean Green	3:45.29
3rd place, bronze medalist(s)	Julie Bergeron	North Texas Mean Green	3:45.29
4th	Normalee Murray	Nebraska Cornhuskers	3:47.08
4th	Janet Bates	Nebraska Cornhuskers	3:47.08
4th	Julie Seaton	Nebraska Cornhuskers	3:47.08
4th	Jennie Gorham	Nebraska Cornhuskers	3:47.08
5th	Ellen Howard	Temple Owls	3:48.22
5th	Gladys Boone	Temple Owls	3:48.22
5th	Amy Whicker	Temple Owls	3:48.22
5th	Edna Brown	Temple Owls	3:48.22
6th	Gloria Russell	Arkansas Razorbacks	3:50.67
6th	Linda Bedford	Arkansas Razorbacks	3:50.67
6th	Lisa Sparks	Arkansas Razorbacks	3:50.67
6th	Diann Ousley	Arkansas Razorbacks	3:50.67
7th		Texas Longhorns	3:52.6
8th		Morgan State Bears	3:56.4

Distance medley relay (Note: Split into two sections and run over imperial distances (440 yards, 880 yards, 1320 yards, mile run), with the 880 yards leg starting the race instead of the 440 yards.)
Pl.	Name	Team	Mark
1st place, gold medalist(s)	Jennifer Whitfield	Villanova Wildcats	11:29.3
1st place, gold medalist(s)	Amelia Cain	Villanova Wildcats	11:29.3
1st place, gold medalist(s)	Suzanne Shea	Villanova Wildcats	11:29.3
1st place, gold medalist(s)	Brigid Leddy	Villanova Wildcats	11:29.3
2nd place, silver medalist(s)	Leisa Biggers	UTEP Miners	11:31.7
2nd place, silver medalist(s)	Rochelle Collins	UTEP Miners	11:31.7
2nd place, silver medalist(s)	Debbie Pearson Mitchell	UTEP Miners	11:31.7
2nd place, silver medalist(s)	Jacqueline Richards	UTEP Miners	11:31.7
3rd place, bronze medalist(s)		Virginia Cavaliers	11:32.2
4th	Pam Moore	Wisconsin Badgers	11:33.9
4th	Ellen Brewster	Wisconsin Badgers	11:33.9
4th	Suzie Houston	Wisconsin Badgers	11:33.9
4th	Rose Thomson	Wisconsin Badgers	11:33.9
5th	Mary Rawe	Penn State Nittany Lions	11:43.9
5th	Debbie Lewis	Penn State Nittany Lions	11:43.9
5th	Penny Fales	Penn State Nittany Lions	11:43.9
5th	Heather Carmichael	Penn State Nittany Lions	11:43.9
6th		Colorado Buffaloes	11:46.2
7th		Iowa Hawkeyes	11:48.0
8th		Purdue Boilermakers	11:52.7
9th		Maryland Terrapins	11:53.6
10th		Drake Bulldogs	11:55.8
11th		Michigan State Spartans	11:58.8
12th		Montana State Bobcats	12:01.4
13th		Western Michigan Broncos	12:03.5
14th		Texas A&M Aggies	12:07.0
15th		Michigan Wolverines	12:09.3
16th		Rhode Island Rams	12:10.6
17th		Missouri Tigers	12:11.3
18th		Kansas Jayhawks	12:14.4
19th		Wyoming Cowgirls	12:16.5

High jump
Pl.	Name	Team	Mark
1st place, gold medalist(s)	Paula Girven	Maryland Terrapins	6 ft 2 in (1.87 m)
2nd place, silver medalist(s)	Sharon Burrill	Nebraska Cornhuskers	6 ft 2 in (1.87 m)
3rd place, bronze medalist(s)	Maria Betioli	BYU Cougars	6 ft 1 in (1.85 m)
4th	Jalene Chase	Maryland Terrapins	6 ft 0 in (1.82 m)
5th	Sally McCarthy	Oklahoma Sooners	6 ft 0 in (1.82 m)
6th	Ann Erpenbeck	Drake Bulldogs	5 ft 11 in (1.8 m)
7th	Helen Ogar	Missouri Tigers	5 ft 11 in (1.8 m)
8th	Nancy Steiner	Nebraska–Kearney Lopers	5 ft 9 in (1.75 m)

Long jump
Pl.	Name	Team	Mark
1st place, gold medalist(s)	Pat Johnson	Wisconsin Badgers	20 ft 10 in (6.35 m)
2nd place, silver medalist(s)	Becky Jo Kaiser	Illinois Fighting Illini	20 ft 5 1/2 in (6.23 m)
3rd place, bronze medalist(s)	Pat Miller	Wyoming Cowgirls	20 ft 3 3/4 in (6.19 m)
4th	Amy Davis	Houston Cougars	19 ft 11 3/4 in (6.08 m)
5th	Angie Bradley	Western Kentucky Lady Toppers	19 ft 11 1/2 in (6.08 m)
6th	Shonel Ferguson	Florida Gators	19 ft 10 1/4 in (6.05 m)
7th	Themis Zambrzycki	BYU Cougars	19 ft 8 3/4 in (6.01 m)
8th	Ether Otieno	UTEP Miners	19 ft 7 1/2 in (5.98 m)

Shot put
Pl.	Name	Team	Mark
1st place, gold medalist(s)	Jill Stenwall	Nebraska–Kearney Lopers	51 ft 1 in (15.57 m)
2nd place, silver medalist(s)	Sandy Burke	Northeastern Huskies	50 ft 5 1/2 in (15.37 m)
3rd place, bronze medalist(s)	Jennifer Smit	UTEP Miners	49 ft 0 1/2 in (14.94 m)
4th	Marita Walton	Maryland Terrapins	48 ft 7 3/4 in (14.82 m)
5th	Onelthea Davis	St. John's Red Storm	48 ft 4 3/4 in (14.75 m)
6th	Annette Bohach	Indiana Hoosiers	48 ft 1 1/4 in (14.66 m)
7th	Rosario Ramos	Colorado Buffaloes	47 ft 7 3/4 in (14.52 m)
8th	Carrie Albano	Oregon Ducks	46 ft 1 1/4 in (14.05 m)

Pentathlon
Pl.	Name	Team	Mark
1st place, gold medalist(s)	Themis Zambrzycki	BYU Cougars	4104 pts
2nd place, silver medalist(s)	Susan Brownell	Virginia Cavaliers	3999 pts
3rd place, bronze medalist(s)	Nora Araujo	Auburn Tigers	3900 pts
4th	Sande Lambert	Texas A&M Aggies	3830 pts
5th	Satu Jaaskelainen	BYU Cougars	3821 pts
6th	Brenda Wilson	Utah State Aggies	3819 pts
7th	Peggy Travis	Montana State Bobcats	3761 pts
8th	Theresa Jaeger	St. John's Red Storm	3749 pts
9th	Lynn Adams	Illinois State Redbirds	3721 pts
10th	Nancy Kindig	Nebraska Cornhuskers	3700 pts
11th	Wendy Limbaugh	Utah State Aggies	3669 pts
12th	Karen Brennan	Colorado State Rams	3649 pts
13th	Sonda Obermeir	Nebraska Cornhuskers	3630 pts
14th	Juanita Alson	Maryland Terrapins	3595 pts
15th	Mary Grinaker	Wisconsin Badgers	3497 pts
16th	Donna Tiegs	Minnesota State Mavericks	3370 pts

== See also ==
- Association for Intercollegiate Athletics for Women championships § Indoor track and field
- 1980 NCAA Division I Indoor Track and Field Championships
