= Paul Dickenson =

English hammer thrower (1949–2024)

Personal information
- Nationality: British (English)
- Born: 4 December 1949 North Shields, Northumberland, England
- Died: 26 November 2024 (aged 74)
- Height: 183 cm (6 ft 0 in)
- Weight: 105 kg (231 lb)

Sport
- Sport: Athletics
- Event: Hammer throw
- Club: Enfield Harriers; Hillingdon AC

Derek Paul Dickenson (4 December 1949 – 26 November 2024) was an English hammer thrower who competed at the 1976 Summer Olympics and the 1980 Summer Olympics.

== Biography ==
Dickenson finished second behind Adam Barnard in the hammer throw event at the 1975 AAA Championships but by virtue of being the highest placed British athlete was considered the British hammer throw champion.

Dickenson represented Great Britain at two consecutive Olympics, starting in 1976 in Montreal, where he finished in 14th place in the hammer throw, throwing 68.52 metres.

After finishing second behind Peter Farmer at the 1978 AAA Championships, he represented England in the hammer throw event, at the 1978 Commonwealth Games in Edmonton, Canada.

His second Olympic appearance came at the 1980 Olympics Games in Moscow, where he represented Great Britain again in the hammer. Two years later he represented England in the hammer throw, at the 1982 Commonwealth Games in Brisbane, Australia.

A former schoolteacher, Dickenson worked in local government and the private sector before starting with BBC television. He commentated on every Olympic Games Winter and Summer from 1992 until his death. Best known for his commentary work on athletics he also worked on basketball, volleyball, weightlifting, canoe slalom, yachting, bobsleigh, skeleton, luge, cross country skiing, speed skating and ski jumping. He was also the lead commentator, and occasional presenter, of the BBC's coverage of the World's Strongest Man events for over a decade.

Dickenson died at home on 26 November 2024, at the age of 74.

== Personal bests ==
| Distance | Mark | Date |
|---|---|---|
| Hammer throw | 73.20 m | 1976 |
| Discus throw | 50.78 m | 1980 |
