= Anna Tarasova =

Kazakhstani athlete

Personal information
- Nationality: Kazakhstani
- Born: 23 March 1980 (age 46) Karaganda, Kazakh SSR, Soviet Union

Sport
- Sport: Athletics
- Events: Long jump Triple jump

Anna Tarasova (born 23 March 1980) is a Kazakhstani athlete. She competed in the women's long jump and the women's triple jump at the 2000 Summer Olympics.

Tarasova was an All-American jumper for the UTEP Miners track and field team, finishing 3rd in the triple jump at the 2001 NCAA Division I Indoor Track and Field Championships.
