= Saad Al-Bishi =

Saudi Arabian shot putter

Personal information
- Nationality: Saudi Arabian
- Born: 13 January 1953 (age 73)

Sport
- Sport: Athletics
- Event: Shot put

Saad Al-Bishi (born 13 January 1953) is a Saudi Arabian athlete. He competed in the men's shot put at the 1976 Summer Olympics.
