= Tore Johnsen (hammer thrower) =

Norwegian hammer thrower

Personal information
- Nationality: Norwegian
- Born: 5 May 1961 (age 64) Gjøvik, Norway

Sport
- Sport: Athletics
- Event: Hammer throw

Tore Johnsen (born 5 May 1961) is a Norwegian athlete. He competed in the men's hammer throw at the 1984 Summer Olympics.

Competing for the UTEP Miners track and field team, Johnsen won the 1982, 1984, and 1985 weight throw at the NCAA Division I Indoor Track and Field Championships with a best throw of 22.02 metres at the 1984 edition.
