= 1978 AAA Championships =

Outdoor track and field competition

- Dates: 23–24 June 1978
- Host city: London, England
- Venue: Crystal Palace National Sports Centre
- Level: Senior
- Type: Outdoor

The 1978 AAA Championships sponsored by Nationwide was the 1978 edition of the annual outdoor track and field competition organised by the Amateur Athletic Association (AAA). It was held from 23 to 24 June 1978 at the Crystal Palace National Sports Centre in London, England.

== Summary ==
The Championships covered two days of competition. The marathon was held in Sandwich and the decathlon was held in Birmingham.

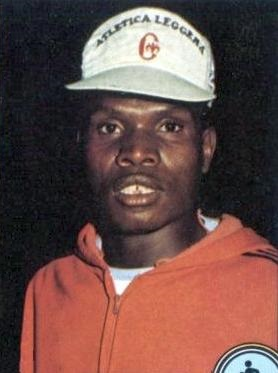
Henry Rono won the 5,000 metres

== Results ==
Event	Gold		Silver		Bronze	
100m	(United States) James Sanford	10.42	(Panama) Guy Abrahams	10.53	(Ghana) Ernest Obeng	10.67
200m	(Jamaica) Don Quarrie	20.79	(Guyana) James Gilkes	20.81	(United States) James Sanford	21.08
400m	(United States) Maurice Peoples	45.78	(Scotland) David Jenkins	46.33	Terry Whitehead	46.69
800m	(United States) Tom McLean	1:48.49	Dave Warren	1:48.80	(United States) Mark Belger	1:48.96
1,500m	David Moorcroft	3:42.92	(Algeria) Amar Brahmia	3:44.29	(United States) Craig Masback	3:44.37
5,000m	(Kenya) Henry Rono	13:20.78	(Kenya) Wilson Waigwa	13:24.43	Nick Rose	13:25.44
10,000m	Brendan Foster	27:30.3 ER	Mike McLeod	28:04.21	Dave Black	28:06.85
marathon	Tony Simmons	2:12:33	Jeff Norman	2:12:50	Trevor Wright	2:13:00
3000m steeplechase	Dennis Coates	8:34.37	Tony Staynings	8:35.77	Micky Morris	8:35.78
110m hurdles	(Wales) Berwyn Price	14.14	Mark Holtom	14.49	Ian Ratcliffe	14.65
400m hurdles	Alan Pascoe	50.39	(United States) Rich Graybehl	50.65	Gary Oakes	51.08
3,000m walk	Roger Mills	12:05.83	Brian Adams	12:24.72	Carl Lawton	12:41.12
10,000m walk	Brian Adams	43:44.0	Roger Mills	45:18.0	George Nibre	45:40.0
high jump	(United States) Franklin Jacobs	2.20	(United States) Gail Olson	2.20	(Scotland) Brian Burgess	2.15
pole vault	(United States) Bob Pullard	5.40	Brian Hooper	5.30	Allan Williams	5.00
long jump	Roy Mitchell	7.76	Ken Cocks	7.57	Tony Henry	7.46
triple jump	Aston Moore	16.68 NR	Keith Connor	16.39	David Johnson	15.85
shot put	Geoff Capes	19.94	Mike Winch	17.85	Bob Dale	17.06
discus throw	Peter Tancred	55.78	John Hillier	53.60	Mike Winch	52.88
hammer throw	(Australia) Peter Farmer	70.72	Paul Dickenson	68.24	Jim Whitehead	67.70
javelin throw	Peter Yates	80.10	David Ottley	77.60	Brian Roberts	75.90
decathlon	Alan Drayton	7424	Buster Watson	7381	John Howell	7190

== See also ==
- 1978 WAAA Championships
