= Fred DeBernardi =

American football player (1949–2020)

No. 69
- Position: Defensive end

Personal information
- Born: March 2, 1949; Santa Clarita, California, U.S.
- Died: December 3, 2020 (aged 71); Las Vegas, Nevada, U.S.
- Listed height: 6 ft 5 in (1.96 m)
- Listed weight: 250 lb (113 kg)

Career information
- High school: Hart (Santa Clarita)
- College: UTEP
- NFL draft: 1972: 11th round, 282nd overall pick

Career history
- Kansas City Chiefs (1974)
- Stats at Pro Football Reference

Fred DeBernardi (March 2, 1949 – December 3, 2020) was an American football defensive end and discus thrower. He played for the Kansas City Chiefs in 1974.

DeBernardi won NCAA Division I Men's Outdoor Track and Field Championships titles in the discus throw and shot put for the UTEP Miners track and field program.

DeBernardi competed in the Masters So Cal Track and Field Championship meet June 1979 and won the M55 Hammer Throw.
