= Athletics at the 1976 Summer Olympics – Men's shot put =

Men's shot put at the Games of the XXI Olympiad
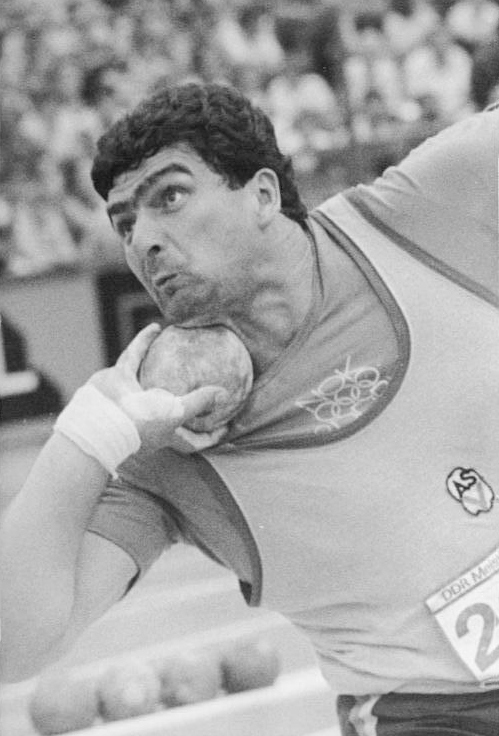
- Udo Beyer (1981)
- Venue: Olympic Stadium
- Dates: 23 July 1976 (qualifying); 24 July 1976 (final)
- Competitors: 23 from 17 nations
- Winning distance: 21.05

Medalists
1st place, gold medalist(s)		Udo Beyer; East Germany
2nd place, silver medalist(s)		Yevgeniy Mironov; Soviet Union
3rd place, bronze medalist(s)		Aleksandr Baryshnikov; Soviet Union

The men's shot put event at the 1976 Summer Olympics in Montreal, Quebec, Canada, had an entry list of 23 competitors from 17 nations, with two qualifying groups (23 putters) before the final (12) took place on Saturday July 24, 1976. The maximum number of athletes per nation had been set at 3 since the 1930 Olympic Congress. The top twelve and ties, and all those reaching 19.40 metres advanced to the final. The qualifying round was held on Friday 23, 1976.

The first round leader was Aleksandr Baryshnikov with a 20.53. Al Feuerbach increased that by 2 cm with a 20.55 in the second round, with Udo Beyer moving into bronze medal position with a 20.50. Baryshnikov upped the ante to 21.00 in the third round and that is the way the leader board stayed until the fifth round. Beyer moved into gold medal position with a 21.05. A few throws later Yevgeny Mironov threw 21.03 and leaped from 6th place to the silver medal.

Beyer's gold medal was the first for East Germany in the men's shot put, and the first gold medal for any German shot putter since 1936. Mironov and Baryshnikov took the Soviet Union's first men's shot put medals since 1968, with Mironov's silver the best-yet result for the nation. The United States was kept off the podium in the event for only the second time (the first was in 1936). East Germany became only the second nation to reach the podium in consecutive Games.

== Background ==
This was the 18th appearance of the event, which is one of 12 athletics events to have been held at every Summer Olympics. Returning finalists from the 1972 Games were two-time silver medalist George Woods and fifth-place finisher Al Feuerbach of the United States, fourth-place finisher Hans-Peter Gies and eleventh-place finisher Heinz-Joachim Rothenburg of East Germany, tenth-place finisher Jaroslav Brabec of Czechoslovakia, twelfth-place finisher Yves Brouzet of France, thirteenth-place finisher Ralf Reichenbach of West Germany, and seventeenth-place finisher Bruce Pirnie of Canada. The third member of the 1972 American team, Brian Oldfield, started competing in the rivaling International Track Association since the Munich Games; his 22.86 metres world record was not ratified by the IAAF and he was barred from entering. The leading eligible athlete was Aleksandr Baryshnikov of the Soviet Union, at 22.00 metres, a favorite in Montreal.

Kuwait made its debut in the men's shot put. The United States appeared for the 18th time, the only nation to have competed in all Olympic shot put competitions to date.

== Competition format ==
The competition used the two-round format introduced in 1936, with the qualifying round completely separate from the divided final. In qualifying, each athlete received three attempts; those recording a mark of at least 19.40 metres advanced to the final. If fewer than 12 athletes achieved that distance, the top 12 would advance. The results of the qualifying round were then ignored. Finalists received three throws each, with the top eight competitors receiving an additional three attempts. The best distance among those six throws counted.

== Records ==
World record	Aleksandr Baryshnikov (URS)	22.00	Colombes, France	10 June 1976
Olympic record	Władysław Komar (POL)	21.18	Munich, West Germany	09 September 1972

For the second time in three Games, the new Olympic record was a qualifying round throw. Aleksandr Baryshnikov broke the Olympic record with a put of 21.32 metres in the qualifying round. Nobody was able to match that mark in the final, with Udo Beyer's gold-winning put only reaching 21.05 metres.

== Schedule ==
All times are Eastern Daylight Time (UTC-4)

Date	Time	Round
Friday, 23 July 1976	10:15	Qualifying
Saturday, 24 July 1976	15:00	Final

== Results ==
=== Qualifying ===
Rank	Athlete	Nation	1	2	3	Distance	Notes
1	Aleksandr Baryshnikov	Soviet Union	21.32 OR	—	—	21.32	Q, OR
2	Hans-Peter Gies	East Germany	20.52	—	—	20.52	Q
3	Geoff Capes	Great Britain	20.40	—	—	20.40	Q
4	Yevgeny Mironov	Soviet Union	18.97	20.26	—	20.26	Q
5	Heinz-Joachim Rothenburg	East Germany	19.92	—	—	19.92	Q
6	Al Feuerbach	United States	19.87	—	—	19.87	Q
7	Jaroslav Brabec	Czechoslovakia	19.80	—	—	19.80	Q
8	Hans Höglund	Sweden	19.30	19.76	—	19.76	Q
9	Udo Beyer	East Germany	19.69	—	—	19.69	Q
10	Peter Shmock	United States	19.48	—	—	19.48	Q
11	Reijo Ståhlberg	Finland	19.08	19.26	19.40	19.40	Q
12	George Woods	United States	19.25	19.27	19.35	19.35	q
13	Ralf Reichenbach	West Germany	19.13	19.31	18.56	19.31	
14	Yves Brouzet	France	18.59	18.75	19.14	19.14	
15	Hreinn Halldórsson	Iceland	X	18.93	18.55	18.93	
16	Ivan Ivančić	Yugoslavia	18.88	18.80	18.75	18.88	
17	Hans Almström	Sweden	18.31	18.76	X	18.76	
18	Jos Schroeder	Belgium	17.78	17.97	18.33	18.33	
19	Jean-Pierre Egger	Switzerland	18.06	X	18.13	18.13	
20	Bruce Pirnie	Canada	X	17.82	X	17.82	
21	Juan Adolfo Turri	Argentina	17.24	16.79	17.76	17.76	
22	Mohamed Al-Zinkawi	Kuwait	13.17	X	X	13.17	
23	Saad Al-Bishi	Saudi Arabia	10.89	11.68	X	11.68	
—	Bishop Dolegiewicz	Canada	DNS				

=== Final ===
Rank	Athlete	Nation	1	2	3	4	5	6	Distance
1st place, gold medalist(s)	Udo Beyer	East Germany	20.38	20.50	20.49	X	21.05	20.45	21.05
2nd place, silver medalist(s)	Yevgeny Mironov	Soviet Union	19.67	20.38	20.14	20.17	21.03	20.66	21.03
3rd place, bronze medalist(s)	Aleksandr Baryshnikov	Soviet Union	20.53	20.27	21.00	20.96	20.58	X	21.00
4	Al Feuerbach	United States	19.74	20.55	20.07	20.21	20.10	20.32	20.55
5	Hans-Peter Gies	East Germany	19.98	20.19	20.47	20.45	20.11	20.13	20.47
6	Geoff Capes	Great Britain	20.15	20.21	20.36	20.32	20.31	X	20.36
7	George Woods	United States	20.13	19.97	20.20	20.26	X	19.87	20.26
8	Hans Höglund	Sweden	20.17	20.10	19.85	19.61	X	X	20.17
9	Peter Shmock	United States	19.77	19.89	19.26	Did not advance			19.89
10	Heinz-Joachim Rothenburg	East Germany	19.26	19.79	X	Did not advance			19.79
11	Jaroslav Brabec	Czechoslovakia	19.62	19.53	X	Did not advance			19.62
12	Reijo Ståhlberg	Finland	18.78	18.99	18.82	Did not advance			18.99
