= 1978 NCAA Indoor Track and Field Championships =

- Dates: March 10–11, 1978
- Host city: Detroit, Michigan
- Venue: Cobo Arena

The 1978 NCAA Indoor Track and Field Championships were contested March 10−11, 1978 at Cobo Arena in Detroit, Michigan at the 14th annual NCAA-sanctioned track meet to determine the individual and team national champions of men's collegiate indoor track and field events in the United States.

UTEP reclaimed the top spot in the team standings, finishing 6 points ahead of Auburn; it was the Miners' fourth overall team title and their fourth in five seasons.

== Qualification ==
Unlike other NCAA-sponsored sports, there were not separate NCAA Division I, Division II, and Division III championships for indoor track and field until 1985. As such, all athletes and programs from all three divisions were eligible to compete.

== Team standings ==
- Note: Top 10 only
- Scoring: 6 points for a 1st-place finish, 4 points for 2nd, 3 points for 3rd, 2 points for 4th, and 1 point for 5th
- ^{(DC)} = Defending Champions
- Full results

Rank	Team	Points
1st place, gold medalist(s)	UTEP	44
2nd place, silver medalist(s)	Auburn	38
3rd place, bronze medalist(s)	Villanova	35
4	Washington State ^{(DC)}	27
5	Alabama	23
6	Maryland; Michigan; Missouri; Providence	20
10	BYU	18
