= James Munyala =

Kenyan athlete (born 1952)

James Munyala (born November 2, 1952) is a Kenyan athlete, known for running the steeplechase. Running for the University of Texas, El Paso he won three straight NCAA Championships 1975–1977. His 1976 win set the Franklin Field record that stood for 32 years. He was part of the controversial beginning wave of imported, older Kenyan athletes who allowed UTEP and Washington State University to dominate NCAA distance running. At the time, Craig Virgin suggested these athletes displaced opportunities for American athletes. Another star athlete mentioned was Washington State's Henry Rono who succeeded Munyala as NCAA Champion, with Munyala as runner-up, in 1978, blocking his attempt to win four straight. Later in 1978, Rono and Munyala went 1-2 for Kenya at both the African Games and the Commonwealth Games. Munyala won the Indoor Mile for UTEP in 1978 and is in the university's Hall of Fame when they ran the triple crown of the Men's Indoor, Outdoor and Cross Country Championships all in the same year.
