= Hans Höglund =

Personal information
- Born: 23 July 1952 Mölndal, Sweden
- Died: 4 October 2012 (aged 60) Sätila, Sweden
- Height: 193 cm (6 ft 4 in)
- Weight: 130 kg (287 lb)

Sport
- Sport: Athletics
- Event: Shot put
- Club: Mölndals AIK

Achievements and titles
- Personal best: 21.33 (1975)

Hans Yngve Höglund (23 July 1952 – 4 October 2012) was a Swedish shot putter. He competed in the 1976 Olympics and finished eighth. Höglund set his personal record of 21.33 m in Provo, Utah, United States, while winning the 1975 NCAA Championships for the University of Texas, El Paso. This results remained the Swedish national record for almost 50 years till Wictor Petersson broke it at the swedish indoor championships with 21.49 M. He also won three consecutive Swedish (1974–76) and NCAA titles (1973 and 1975).
