= 1985 NCAA Division I Outdoor Track and Field Championships =

- Men's Champion: Arkansas (1st title); Women's Champion: Oregon (1st title)
- Edition: 64th (Men); 4th (Women)
- Dates: May 27 − June 1, 1985
- Host city: Austin, Texas
- Venue: Memorial Stadium; University of Texas at Austin

The 1985 NCAA Division I Outdoor Track and Field Championships were contested May 27 − June 1, 1985 at Memorial Stadium at the University of Texas at Austin in Austin, Texas in order to determine the individual and team national champions of men's and women's collegiate Division I outdoor track and field events in the United States.

These were the 64th annual men's championships and the fourth annual women's championships. This was the Longhorns' fourth time hosting the event and the first since 1980.

Arkansas and Oregon topped the men's and women's team standings, respectively; it was the Razorbacks' first men's team title and the first for the Ducks' women's program. This was Arkansas' first title before their run of nine consecutive championships during the 1990s.

== Team results ==
- Note: Top 10 only
- (H) = Hosts

=== Men's standings ===
Rank	Team	Points
1st place, gold medalist(s)	Arkansas	61
2nd place, silver medalist(s)	Washington State	46
3rd place, bronze medalist(s)	Baylor	37
4	Iowa State	35
5	BYU	28
6	Missouri	27
7	Houston; Oregon	26
9	Alabama; SMU; Tennessee; Texas (H)	25

=== Women's standings ===
Rank	Team	Points
1st place, gold medalist(s)	Oregon	52
2nd place, silver medalist(s)	Florida State; LSU	46
4	Arizona; UCLA	45
6	Texas (H)	41
7	Tennessee	30
8	Los Angeles State	28
9	San Diego State	24
10	Alabama	22 1/2
