= Carlos Scott (American football) =

American football player (born 1960)

No. 56, 66
- Positions: Center, tackle

Personal information
- Born: July 2, 1960 (age 66); Hempstead, Texas, U.S.
- Listed height: 6 ft 4 in (1.93 m)
- Listed weight: 295 lb (134 kg)

Career information
- High school: Waller (Waller, Texas)
- College: UTEP
- NFL draft: 1983: 7th round, 184th overall pick

Career history
- St. Louis Cardinals (1983–1985); New York Jets (1987)*; Denver Broncos (1987)*; Phoenix Cardinals (1988)*
- * Offseason or practice squad member only

Career NFL statistics
- Games played: 45
- Games started: 1
- Stats at Pro Football Reference

Carlos B. Scott Jr. (born July 2, 1960) is an American former professional football player who was an offensive lineman for the St. Louis Cardinals of the National Football League (NFL). He played college football for the UTEP Miners.

== Early life ==
Scott was born July 2, 1960, in Hempstead, Texas, and grew up in nearby Waller. He attended Waller High School where he was a three-sport athlete in football, basketball, and track, and was the Texas Class 2A State shot put champion from 1976 to 1978. As a football player, he earned all-district honors. He graduated from Waller in 1978.

== College career ==
Scott attended the University of Texas at El Paso on an athletic scholarship and played football and track at the university.

As a football player, Scott lettered from 1978 to 1981 and was made the team's MVP in 1982. In track, he competed in shot put and discus. He was the WAC indoor shot put champion from 1980 to 1982 and discus champion in 1980.

He later returned to the school to graduate in 1989 with a bachelor's degree in education.

== Professional football career ==
=== St. Louis Cardinals ===
Scott was selected in the seventh round of the 1983 NFL draft by the St. Louis Cardinals. He was with the team for three seasons from 1983 to 1985, playing in 45 games total with one start in 1983.

Scott was released by the Cardinals on August 22, 1986.

=== Denver Broncos ===
In 1987, Scott served as a replacement player for the Denver Broncos during the 1987 NFL players' strike, though he never actually appeared in any of the three replacement games.

== After football ==
Scott continued to participate in discus events after his NFL career, finishing fourth in the 1992 Olympic Trials, third in the 1994 USA Nationals, and first in the 1994 US Olympic Festival discus championship. He was also a member of Team USA at the 1995 Pan American Games.
