= Paul Gibson (wide receiver) =

American football player (1948–1975)

No. 41
- Position: Wide receiver

Personal information
- Born: June 20, 1948; Paris, Arkansas, U.S.
- Died: May 23, 1975 (aged 26); El Paso, Texas, U.S.
- Listed height: 6 ft 2 in (1.88 m)
- Listed weight: 195 lb (88 kg)

Career information
- High school: Carlsbad (NM)
- College: UTEP
- NFL draft: 1972: 8th round, 183rd overall pick

Career history
- Green Bay Packers (1972)
- Stats at Pro Football Reference

Paul Dean Gibson (June 20, 1948 – May 23, 1975) was a wide receiver in the National Football League (NFL).

== Career ==
A track star at University of Texas at El Paso, Gibson won the 1970 NCAA high hurdles title. He was drafted in the eighth round of the 1972 NFL draft by the Buffalo Bills and was a member of the Green Bay Packers that season. He played at the collegiate level at the University of Texas at El Paso. After appearing in one game for the Packers, he signed with the International Track Association in 1974.

He died from injuries suffered in an auto accident in 1975.
