= Wilson Waigwa =

Kenyan middle- and long-distance runner

Personal information
- Nationality: Kenyan
- Born: 15 February 1949 (age 77)
- Height: 172 cm (5 ft 8 in)
- Weight: 64 kg (141 lb)

Sport
- Sport: Athletics
- Event: long-distance

Wilson Wakiihuri Waigwa (born 15 February 1949) is a Kenyan long distance and middle-distance runner. He competed for Kenya in the 5,000 meters at the 1984 Olympics. He also competed for Kenya at the 1987 World Indoor Championships and the 1984 World Cross Country Championships.

While competing for the University of Texas at El Paso he won the 1977 NCAA Championship in the 1,500 meters. He first broke 4 minutes for the mile on February 15, 1974 and was a formidable world class miler for more than a decade.

Waigwa finished second behind fellow Kenyan Henry Rono in the 5,000 metres event at the British 1978 AAA Championships and won the 1982 AAA Championships.

His personal record was 3:50.73 set at the end of the 1983 season in Koblenz, Germany. More than 3 decades later it still ranks as #88 on the all-time list at the time he was running he was in the top dozen.
