= 1974 NCAA Indoor Track and Field Championships =

- Dates: March 8−9, 1974
- Host city: Detroit, Michigan
- Venue: Cobo Arena

The 1974 NCAA Indoor Track and Field Championships were contested March 8−9, 1974 at Cobo Arena in Detroit, Michigan at the 10th annual NCAA-sanctioned track meet to determine the individual and team national champions of men's collegiate indoor track and field events in the United States.

UTEP topped the team standings, the Miners' first indoor team title.

== Qualification ==
Unlike other NCAA-sponsored sports, there were not separate NCAA Division I, Division II, and Division III championships for indoor track and field until 1985. As such, all athletes and programs from all three divisions were eligible to compete.

== Team standings ==
- Note: Top 10 only
- Scoring: 6 points for a 1st-place finish, 4 points for 2nd, 3 points for 3rd, 2 points for 4th, and 1 point for 5th
- ^{(DC)} = Defending Champions
- Full results

Rank	Team	Points
1st place, gold medalist(s)	UTEP	19
2nd place, silver medalist(s)	Colorado	18
3rd place, bronze medalist(s)	South Carolina	12
4	Oregon State; Seton Hall	10
6	Illinois	9
7	Eastern Michigan; Florida State	8
9	Alabama; Kansas State; Penn; Tennessee; Villanova	7
32	Manhattan ^{(DC)}	4
