= 1979 NCAA Division I Outdoor Track and Field Championships =

- Team Champion: UTEP (3rd title)
- Edition: 58th
- Dates: May 29 − June 2, 1979
- Host city: Champaign, Illinois
- Venue: Memorial Stadium; University of Illinois at Urbana–Champaign

The 1979 NCAA Men's Division I Outdoor Track and Field Championships were contested May 29 − June 2 at the 58th annual NCAA-sanctioned track meet to determine the individual and team national champions of men's collegiate Division I outdoor track and field events in the United States.

This year's meet was contested at Memorial Stadium at the University of Illinois in Champaign, Illinois, which hosted for the second time overall and for the first time since 1977.

After winning a co-championship in 1978, UTEP easily finished atop this year's team standings and claimed their third national title.

== Team result ==
- Note: Top 10 only
- (H) = Hosts

Rank	Team	Points
1st place, gold medalist(s)	UTEP	64
2nd place, silver medalist(s)	Villanova	48
3rd place, bronze medalist(s)	UCLA	36
4	Auburn	30
5	Oregon; Washington	28
6	USC	25 1/2
7	LSU; Maryland	22
8	Washington State	21
9	Arizona; Florida State; Tennessee; Texas A&M	20
10	Oregon State	17
