= 1973 NCAA University Division Outdoor Track and Field Championships =

- Team Champions: UCLA (5th title)
- Edition: 52nd
- Dates: June 5−9, 1973
- Host city: Baton Rouge, Louisiana
- Venue: Bernie Moore Track Stadium; Louisiana State University

The 1973 NCAA University Division Outdoor Track and Field Championships were contested June 5−9 at the 52nd annual NCAA-sanctioned track meet to determine the individual and team national champions of men's collegiate University Division outdoor track and field events in the United States.

This year's outdoor meet was hosted by Louisiana State University at the Bernie Moore Track Stadium in Baton Rouge. It was also the first meet to be held over five days, as the decathlon was contested separately.

UCLA once again topped team standings, winning their third consecutive, and fifth overall, team national title.

== Team result ==
- Note: Top 10 only
- (H) = Hosts

Rank	Team	Points
1st place, gold medalist(s)	UCLA	52
2nd place, silver medalist(s)	Oregon	31
3rd place, bronze medalist(s)	Arizona State; BYU	26
4	Tennessee	24
5	Kent State; UTEP	22
6	Memphis State; Texas	20
7	Rice	19
8	Michigan State	18
9	Kansas	17 1/2
10	Colorado; North Carolina; Western Kentucky	14
