= 1976 NCAA Division I Outdoor Track and Field Championships =

- Team Champion: USC (26th title)
- Edition: 55th
- Dates: June 1−5, 1976
- Host city: Philadelphia, Pennsylvania
- Venue: Franklin Field; University of Pennsylvania

The 1976 NCAA Men's Division I Outdoor Track and Field Championships were contested June 1−5 at the 55th annual NCAA-sanctioned track meet to determine the individual and team national champions of men's collegiate Division I outdoor track and field events in the United States.

This year's meet was hosted by the University of Pennsylvania at Franklin Field in Philadelphia.

USC finished first in the team standings, capturing their record twenty-sixth national title.

High jumper Dwight Stones of Long Beach State raised his three-year-old world record a half-inch (1 cm) to 7 ft 7 in (2.31 m).

This was the first edition of the NCAA championships with the races measured in meters; previously the race distances were measured in yards.

== Team result ==
- Note: Top 10 only
- (H) = Hosts

Rank	Team	Points
1st place, gold medalist(s)	USC	64
2nd place, silver medalist(s)	UTEP	44
3rd place, bronze medalist(s)	Tennessee	40
4	Washington State	34
5	Arizona State	31
6	BYU	30
7	Washington	28
8	Auburn	22
9	Kansas; San José State	20
10	Long Beach State	18
