= 1981 NCAA Division I Outdoor Track and Field Championships =

- Team Champion: UTEP (5th title)
- Edition: 60th
- Dates: June 2−6, 1981
- Host city: Baton Rouge, Louisiana
- Venue: Bernie Moore Track Stadium; Louisiana State University

The 1981 NCAA Men's Division I Outdoor Track and Field Championships were contested June 2−6 at the 60th annual NCAA-sanctioned track meet to determine the individual and team national champions of men's collegiate Division I outdoor track and field events in the United States.

This was the final meet before the introduction of women's events at the 1982 championship

This year's meet was contested at Bernie Moore Track Stadium at Louisiana State University in Baton Rouge, Louisiana. This was the Tigers' second time hosting the event and the first since 1973.

UTEP finished atop the team standings for the fourth consecutive year and, therefore, claimed their fifth national title.

== Team result ==
- Note: Top 10 only
- (H) = Hosts

| Rank | Team | Points |
|---|---|---|
| 1st place, gold medalist(s) | UTEP | 70 |
| 2nd place, silver medalist(s) | SMU | 57 |
| 3rd place, bronze medalist(s) | Tennessee | 50 |
| 4 | Arizona State | 36 |
| 5 | UCLA | 30 |
| 6 | BYU | 28 |
| 7 | Houston | 24 |
| 8 | Iowa State | 20 |
| 9 | Indiana | 18 |
| 10 | California | 17 1/2 |
