= 1978 NCAA Division I Outdoor Track and Field Championships =

- Team Champions: UCLA (6th title) and UTEP (2nd title)
- Edition: 57th
- Dates: June 1−3, 1978
- Host city: Eugene, Oregon
- Venue: Hayward Field; University of Oregon

The 1978 NCAA Men's Division I Outdoor Track and Field Championships were contested June 1−3 at the 57th annual NCAA-sanctioned track meet to determine the individual and team national champions of men's collegiate Division I outdoor track and field events in the United States.

This year's meet was hosted by the University of Oregon at Hayward Field in Eugene, Oregon.

UCLA and UTEP, each with 50 points, tied atop the team standings and were declared co-national champions; it was the Bruins' sixth title and the Miners' second.

The USC Trojans track and field team originally won the men's team title with 59 points. However, in June 1980 the title was vacated after their runner Billy Mullins was found to be ineligible. This left the runners-up UCLA and UTEP as co-champions.

== Team result ==
- Note: Top 10 only
- (H) = Hosts

Rank	Team	Points
1st place, gold medalist(s)	UCLA; UTEP	50
2nd place, silver medalist(s)	Oregon (H)	40
3rd place, bronze medalist(s)	Auburn	36
4	USC	35
5	UC Irvine	28
6	BYU	27
7	Villanova	26
8	Maryland; Washington State	25
9	Oklahoma	22
10	Washington	21
