= 1982 NCAA Division I Outdoor Track and Field Championships =

- Men's Champion: UTEP (6th title); Women's Champion: UCLA (1st title)
- Edition: 61st (Men); 1st (Women)
- Dates: May 31 − June 5, 1982
- Host city: Provo, Utah
- Venue: Clarence F. Robison Track and Field Complex; Brigham Young University

The 1982 NCAA Division I Outdoor Track and Field Championships were contested May 31 − June 5 at the Clarence F. Robison Track and Field Complex at Brigham Young University in Provo, Utah in order to determine the individual and team national champions of men's and, for the first time, women's collegiate Division I outdoor track and field events in the United States.

These were the 61st annual NCAA men's championships and the inaugural women's championships. Prior to this season, the women's championship was hosted by the AIAW (1973-1982) or the DGWS (1969-1972) and held at a separate location. This was the Cougars' third time hosting the event and the first since 1975.

UTEP and UCLA topped the men's and women's team standings, respectively; the Miners claimed their sixth overall, and fifth consecutive, team title while the Bruins' claimed their first.

== Team results ==
- Note: Top 10 only
- (H) = Hosts

=== Men's title ===
Rank	Team	Points
1st place, gold medalist(s)	UTEP	105
2nd place, silver medalist(s)	Tennessee	94
3rd place, bronze medalist(s)	Washington State	85
4	Oregon	76
5	UCLA	75
6	SMU	71
7	Houston	63
8	California	53
9	Alabama	47
10	Texas	44

=== Women's title ===
Rank	Team	Points
1st place, gold medalist(s)	UCLA	153
2nd place, silver medalist(s)	Tennessee	126
3rd place, bronze medalist(s)	Florida State	119 1/2
4	Oregon	104
5	Stanford	78
6	Arizona	58
7	Nebraska	51
8	Cal State Los Angeles; UTEP	48
9	San Diego State	47
10	Prairie View A&M; Virginia	40
