= 1976 NCAA Indoor Track and Field Championships =

Athletics

- Dates: March 12–13, 1976
- Host city: Detroit, Michigan
- Venue: Cobo Arena

The 1976 NCAA Indoor Track and Field Championships were contested March 12−13, 1976 at Cobo Arena in Detroit, Michigan at the 12th annual NCAA-sanctioned track meet to determine the individual and team national champions of men's collegiate indoor track and field events in the United States.

UTEP once again topped the team standings, the Miners' third consecutive and third overall indoor team title.

== Qualification ==
Unlike other NCAA-sponsored sports, there were not separate NCAA Division I, Division II, and Division III championships for indoor track and field until 1985. As such, all athletes and programs from all three divisions were eligible to compete.

== Team standings ==
- Note: Top 10 only
- Scoring: 6 points for a 1st-place finish, 4 points for 2nd, 3 points for 3rd, 2 points for 4th, and 1 point for 5th
- ^{(DC)} = Defending Champions
- Full results

| Rank | Team | Points |
|---|---|---|
| 1st place, gold medalist(s) | UTEP ^{(DC)} | 23 |
| 2nd place, silver medalist(s) | Villanova | 15 |
| 3rd place, bronze medalist(s) | Tennessee | 14 |
| 4 | Illinois; Washington State | 13 |
| 6 | Auburn | 12 |
| 7 | Kansas State; Long Beach State; Western Kentuckty | 10 |
| 10 | Arkansas State; Michigan; Mississippi State; New Mexico | 7 |
