= 1975 NCAA Indoor Track and Field Championships =

- Dates: March 15, 1975
- Host city: Detroit, Michigan
- Venue: Cobo Arena

The 1975 NCAA Indoor Track and Field Championships were contested March 15, 1975 at Cobo Arena in Detroit, Michigan at the 11th annual NCAA-sanctioned track meet to determine the individual and team national champions of men's collegiate indoor track and field events in the United States.

UTEP again topped the team standings, the Miners' second consecutive and second overall indoor team title.

== Qualification ==
Unlike other NCAA-sponsored sports, there were not separate NCAA Division I, Division II, and Division III championships for indoor track and field until 1985. As such, all athletes and programs from all three divisions were eligible to compete.

== Team standings ==
- Note: Top 10 only
- Scoring: 6 points for a 1st-place finish, 4 points for 2nd, 3 points for 3rd, 2 points for 4th, and 1 point for 5th
- ^{(DC)} = Defending Champions
- Full results

Rank	Team	Points
1st place, gold medalist(s)	UTEP ^{(DC)}	36
2nd place, silver medalist(s)	Kansas	17 1/2
3rd place, bronze medalist(s)	Villanova	15
4	Eastern Michigan	14
5	Florida Washington State Western Kentucky	10
8	Penn State	9
9	BYU; Seton Hall	8
