= 1974 NCAA Division I Outdoor Track and Field Championships =

- Team Champions: Tennessee (1st title)
- Edition: 53rd
- Dates: June 4−8, 1974
- Host city: Austin, Texas
- Venue: Memorial Stadium; University of Texas at Austin

The 1974 NCAA Men's Division I Outdoor Track and Field Championships were contested June 4−8 at the 53rd annual NCAA-sanctioned track meet to determine the individual and team national champions of men's collegiate University Division outdoor track and field events in the United States. This was the first championship after the NCAA rechristened the former University Division as Division I.

The inaugural Division III championship, contested in Charleston, Illinois and won by Ashland, was also held this year after the NCAA's decision to split the former College Division into Division II and Division III.

This year's meet was hosted by the University of Texas at Austin at Memorial Stadium in Austin.

Tennessee edged three-time defending champions UCLA in the team standings to take home their first team national title.

== Team result ==
- Note: Top 10 only
- (H) = Hosts

Rank	Team	Points
1st place, gold medalist(s)	Tennessee	60
2nd place, silver medalist(s)	UCLA	56
3rd place, bronze medalist(s)	BYU	41
4	North Carolina Central	35
5	Oregon State	26
6	UTEP	25
7	Kansas; USC	22
8	Washington; Western Kentucky	18
9	Indiana	17
10	Colorado; Penn	16
