= 1980 NCAA Division I Outdoor Track and Field Championships =

- Team Champion: UTEP (4th title)
- Edition: 59th
- Dates: June 3−7, 1980
- Host city: Austin, Texas
- Venue: Memorial Stadium; University of Texas at Austin

The 1980 NCAA Men's Division I Outdoor Track and Field Championships were contested June 3−7 at the 59th annual NCAA-sanctioned track meet to determine the individual and team national champions of men's collegiate Division I outdoor track and field events in the United States.

This year's meet was contested at Memorial Stadium at the University of Texas at Austin in Austin, Texas. This was the third time the Longhorns hosted the event, and the first since 1974.

UTEP topped the team standings for the third consecutive year and, therefore, claimed their fourth national title.

== Team result ==
- Note: Top 10 only
- (H) = Hosts

Rank	Team	Points
1st place, gold medalist(s)	UTEP	69
2nd place, silver medalist(s)	UCLA	46
3rd place, bronze medalist(s)	Florida State	38
4	USC	36
5	Villanova	26
6	Alabama; Oregon	24
7	Kansas	20
8	Texas (H)	19
9	St. John's (NY)	18
10	Oklahoma State	16
