= 1975 NCAA Division I Outdoor Track and Field Championships =

Coordinates: 40.258°N 111.655°W

- Team Champions: UTEP (1st title)
- Edition: 54th
- Dates: June 3−7, 1975
- Host city: Provo, Utah
- Venue: Cougar Stadium; Brigham Young University

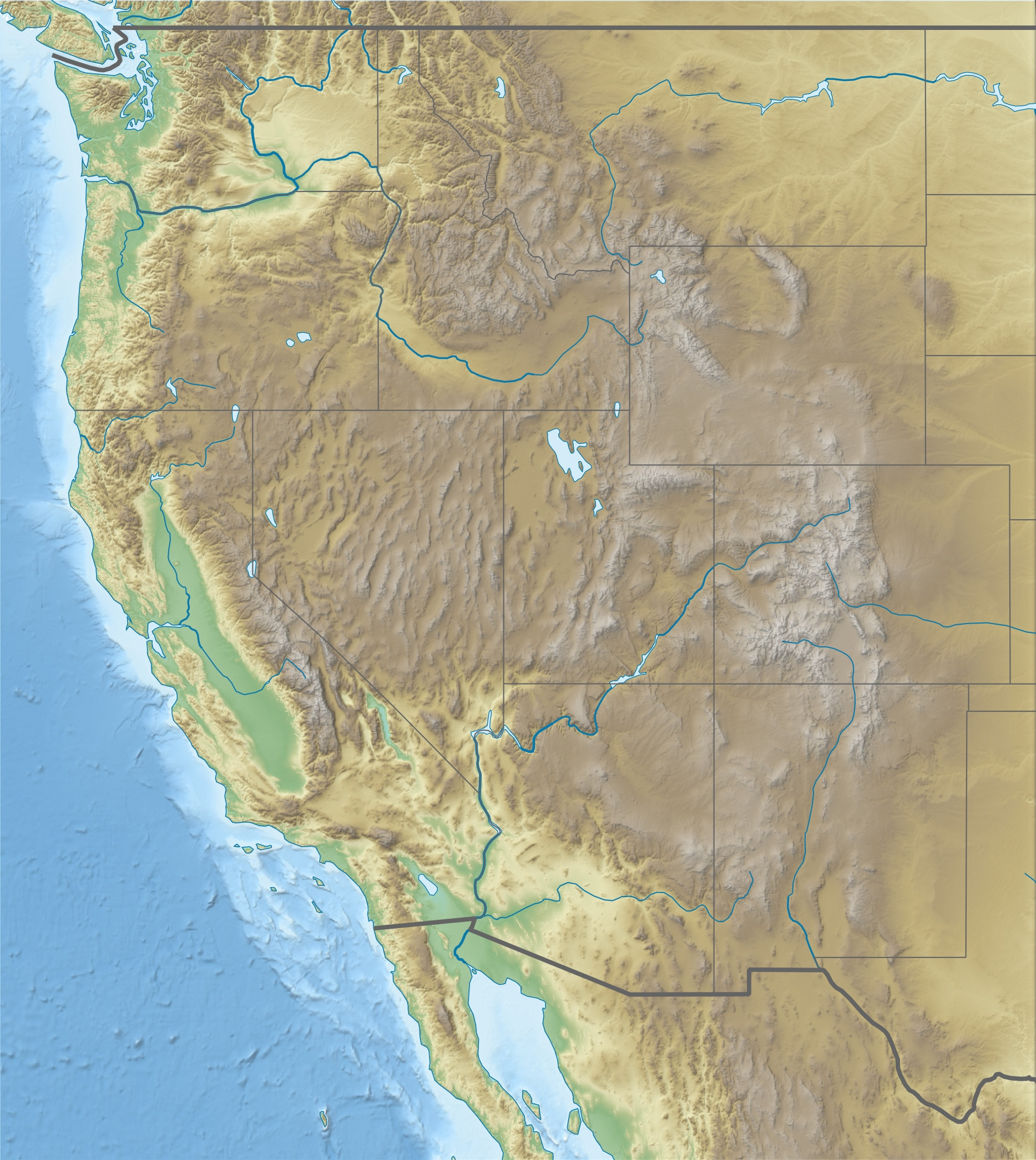
Location in the western United States
Location in Utah

The 1975 NCAA Division I Men's Outdoor Track and Field Championships were contested June 3−7 at the 54th annual NCAA-sanctioned track meet to determine the individual and team national champions of men's collegiate Division I outdoor track and field events in the United States.

This year's meet was hosted by Brigham Young University at Cougar Stadium in Provo, Utah. The venue previously hosted the championships eight years earlier in 1967; the approximate elevation of the track was 4,660 feet (1,420 m) above sea level. (The track was removed from the stadium in 1982.)

The UTEP Miners finished just ahead of UCLA in the team standings and captured their first team national title. The title marked the beginning of UTEP's reign as a track & field dynasty – in the following seven seasons, they finished either as champion or runner-up, including five consecutive titles (1978–82).

This was the last edition of the NCAA championships with the races measured in yards; race distances were changed to meters for 1976.

== Team result ==
- Note: Top 10 only
- (H) = Hosts

Rank	Team	Points
1st place, gold medalist(s)	UTEP	55
2nd place, silver medalist(s)	UCLA	42
3rd place, bronze medalist(s)	USC	37
4	San José State	32
5	Kansas	27
6	Oregon; Tennessee	24
7	BYU (H)	21 1/2
8	Washington State	20
9	Washington	17
10	Illinois	16
