= 1981 NCAA Indoor Track and Field Championships =

- Dates: March 13–14, 1981
- Host city: Detroit, Michigan
- Venue: Cobo Arena

The 1981 NCAA Indoor Track and Field Championships were contested March 13−14, 1981 at Cobo Arena in Detroit, Michigan at the 17th annual NCAA-sanctioned track meet to determine the individual and team national champions of men's collegiate indoor track and field events in the United States. This was Cobo Arena's final time hosting the event after hosting all previous seventeen indoor championships.

UTEP once again topped the team standings, finishing 25 points ahead of SMU. The Miners claimed their second consecutive and sixth overall indoor team title and their sixth title in eight seasons.

== Qualification ==
Unlike other NCAA-sponsored sports, there were not separate NCAA Division I, Division II, and Division III championships for indoor track and field until 1985. As such, all athletes and programs from all three divisions were eligible to compete.

== Team standings ==
- Note: Top 10 only
- Scoring: 6 points for a 1st-place finish, 4 points for 2nd, 3 points for 3rd, 2 points for 4th, and 1 point for 5th
- ^{(DC)} = Defending Champions
- Full results

Rank	Team	Points
1st place, gold medalist(s)	UTEP ^{(DC)}	76
2nd place, silver medalist(s)	SMU	51
3rd place, bronze medalist(s)	Tennessee	33
4	BYU	26
5	Houston; Seton Hall; Villanova	20
8	Washington State	18
9	Fairleigh Dickinson	16
10	Nebraska	12
