= Peter Farmer (hammer thrower) =

Australian-American hammer thrower

Personal information
- Nationality: Australian
- Born: 25 June 1952 (age 74) Sydney, Australia
- Height: 184 cm (6 ft 0 in)
- Weight: 130 kg (287 lb)

Sport
- Sport: Athletics
- Event: Hammer thrower
- Club: Randwick Botany Harriers
Medal record
Men's Athletics
British Commonwealth Games
Bronze medal – third place	1974 Christchurch	Hammer throw
Gold medal – first place	1978 Edmonton	Hammer throw

Peter John Farmer (born 25 June 1952) is an Australian born hammer thrower who competed at the 1976 Summer Olympics and 1980 Summer Olympics.

== Biography ==
Born in Sydney, New South Wales, Australia, he moved to El Paso, Texas, USA, in the early 1970s to pursue his academic career at University of Texas at El Paso, where he completed his bachelor's, master's and doctoral degrees. He twice competed at the IAAF World Cup.

He participated in:

- 1974 British Commonwealth Games - Bronze Medal
- 1976 Summer Olympics
- 1978 Commonwealth Games - Gold Medal
- 1980 Summer Olympics

Farmer twice won the British AAA Championships title at the 1978 AAA Championships and the 1979 AAA Championships.

After retiring from competition, he held coaching appointments including national coach of Mexico, throwing coach of Norway and at the Australian Institute of Sport.

Farmer was also a television sports reporter and international commentator (Network 10 and ABC); and executive director of a non-profit sports and recreation community organization.

Farmer wrote a book on planning and management of sport facilities, and has written several book chapters and articles in the areas of risk management, event and facility management, and areas in track and field.

He has resided between the USA (Texas, North Carolina, Louisiana) and Australia.
