= 1979 NCAA Indoor Track and Field Championships =

- Dates: March 9–10, 1979
- Host city: Detroit, Michigan
- Venue: Cobo Arena

The 1979 NCAA Indoor Track and Field Championships were contested March 9−10, 1979 at Cobo Arena in Detroit, Michigan at the 15th annual NCAA-sanctioned track meet to determine the individual and team national champions of men's collegiate indoor track and field events in the United States.

Villanova took the top spot in the team standings, finishing just 1 point ahead of defending champions and perennial track power UTEP. The Wildcats claimed their second indoor team title and first since 1968.

== Qualification ==
Unlike other NCAA-sponsored sports, there were not separate NCAA Division I, Division II, and Division III championships for indoor track and field until 1985. As such, all athletes and programs from all three divisions were eligible to compete.

== Team standings ==
- Note: Top 10 only
- Scoring: 6 points for a 1st-place finish, 4 points for 2nd, 3 points for 3rd, 2 points for 4th, and 1 point for 5th
- ^{(DC)} = Defending Champions
- Full results

Rank	Team	Points
1st place, gold medalist(s)	Villanova	52
2nd place, silver medalist(s)	UTEP ^{(DC)}	51
3rd place, bronze medalist(s)	Auburn	27
4	Kansas; Tennessee	24
6	Maryland	22
7	Harvard	16
8	Dartmouth; Indiana; Missouri; Wisconsin	14
