= 1973 NCAA Indoor Track and Field Championships =

- Dates: March 9−10, 1973
- Host city: Detroit, Michigan
- Venue: Cobo Arena

The 1973 NCAA Indoor Track and Field Championships were contested March 9−10, 1973 at Cobo Arena in Detroit, Michigan at the ninth annual NCAA-sanctioned track meet to determine the individual and team national champions of men's collegiate indoor track and field events in the United States.

Manhattan topped the team standings, the Jaspers' first indoor team title (and only NCAA championship in any sport).

== Qualification ==
Unlike other NCAA-sponsored sports, there were not separate University Division and College Division championships for indoor track and field until 1985. As such, all athletes and teams from University and College Division programs were eligible to compete.

== Team standings ==
- Note: Top 10 only
- ^{(DC)} = Defending Champions
- Full results

Rank	Team	Points
1st place, gold medalist(s)	Manhattan	18
2nd place, silver medalist(s)	Kansas; Kent State; UTEP	12
5	North Carolina	10
6	USC; Southern Illinois	9
8	Michigan; Middle Tennessee State; Nebraska; Tennessee; Wisconsin	8
15	Villanova ^{(DC)}	6
