= 1977 NCAA Indoor Track and Field Championships =

- Dates: March 11–12, 1977
- Host city: Detroit, Michigan
- Venue: Cobo Arena

The 1977 NCAA Indoor Track and Field Championships were contested March 11−12, 1977 at Cobo Arena in Detroit, Michigan at the 13th annual NCAA-sanctioned track meet to determine the individual and team national champions of men's collegiate indoor track and field events in the United States.

Washington State topped the team standings, finishing just 0.5 points ahead of three-time defending champions UTEP, the closest finish in meet history. It was the Cougars' first indoor team title.

== Qualification ==
Unlike other NCAA-sponsored sports, there were not separate NCAA Division I, Division II, and Division III championships for indoor track and field until 1985. As such, all athletes and programs from all three divisions were eligible to compete.

== Team standings ==
- Note: Top 10 only
- Scoring: 6 points for a 1st-place finish, 4 points for 2nd, 3 points for 3rd, 2 points for 4th, and 1 point for 5th
- ^{(DC)} = Defending Champions
- Full results

Rank	Team	Points
1st place, gold medalist(s)	Washington State	25 1/2
2nd place, silver medalist(s)	UTEP ^{(DC)}	25
3rd place, bronze medalist(s)	Villanova	21
4	Illinois	16
5	Kansas	12 1/2
6	Alabama; Auburn; Oklahoma	10
9	New Mexico	9
10	Howard; Nebraska	8
