= 1980 NCAA Indoor Track and Field Championships =

- Dates: March 14–15, 1980
- Host city: Detroit, Michigan
- Venue: Cobo Arena

The 1980 NCAA Indoor Track and Field Championships were contested March 14−15, 1980 at Cobo Arena in Detroit, Michigan at the 16th annual NCAA-sanctioned track meet to determine the individual and team national champions of men's collegiate indoor track and field events in the United States.

UTEP reclaimed the top spot in the team standings, finishing 24 points ahead of defending champions Villanova. The Miners claimed their fifth indoor team title and fifth title in seven seasons.

== Qualification ==
Unlike other NCAA-sponsored sports, there were not separate NCAA Division I, Division II, and Division III championships for indoor track and field until 1985. As such, all athletes and programs from all three divisions were eligible to compete.

== Team standings ==
- Note: Top 10 only
- Scoring: 6 points for a 1st-place finish, 4 points for 2nd, 3 points for 3rd, 2 points for 4th, and 1 point for 5th
- ^{(DC)} = Defending Champions
- Full results

Rank	Team	Points
1st place, gold medalist(s)	UTEP	76
2nd place, silver medalist(s)	Villanova ^{(DC)}	42
3rd place, bronze medalist(s)	Tennessee	38
4	Kansas	26 3/4
5	Indiana	25
6	Fairleigh Dickinson	22
7	Texas A&M	21 3/4
8	Auburn	15
9	Houston; Michigan	14
