= 1977 NCAA Division I Outdoor Track and Field Championships =

- Team Champion: Arizona State (1st title)
- Edition: 56th
- Dates: May 31 − June 4, 1977
- Host city: Champaign, Illinois
- Venue: Memorial Stadium; University of Illinois at Urbana–Champaign

The 1977 NCAA Men's Division I Outdoor Track and Field Championships were contested May 31 − June 4 at the 56th annual NCAA-sanctioned track meet to determine the individual and team national champions of men's collegiate Division I outdoor track and field events in the United States.

This year's meet was hosted at Memorial Stadium at the University of Illinois in Champaign.

Arizona State finished fourteen points ahead of UTEP in the team standings and captured their first national title.

== Team result ==
- Note: Top 10 only
- (H) = Hosts

Rank	Team	Points
1st place, gold medalist(s)	Arizona State	64
2nd place, silver medalist(s)	UTEP	50
3rd place, bronze medalist(s)	USC	48
4	Washington State	46
5	UCLA	35
6	BYU	31
7	Illinois (H)	30
8	Auburn; Villanova	20
9	Oklahoma; Stanford	16
10	Kansas; San José State	14
