= Wisconsin Badgers track and field =

College track and field team

- University: University of Wisconsin–Madison
- Head coach: Mick Byrne
- Conference: Big Ten
- Location: Madison, Wisconsin
- Outdoor track: Dan McClimon Memorial Track/Soccer Complex
- Nickname: Badgers
- Colors: Cardinal and white

NCAA Indoor National Championships
- Men: 2007; Women: 1978 (AIAW)

The Wisconsin Badgers track and field team is the track and field program that represents University of Wisconsin–Madison. The Badgers compete in NCAA Division I as a member of the Big Ten Conference. The team is based in Madison, Wisconsin, at the Dan McClimon Memorial Track/Soccer Complex.

The program is coached by Mick Byrne. The track and field program officially encompasses four teams because the NCAA considers men's and women's indoor track and field and outdoor track and field as separate sports.

The Badgers have won one NCAA Division I team title in track and field, at the men's 2007 NCAA Division I Indoor Track and Field Championships. The women's team won the 1978 AIAW Indoor Track and Field Championships.

== Postseason ==
=== AIAW ===
The Badgers have had 18 AIAW individual All-Americans finishing in the top six at the AIAW indoor or outdoor championships.

AIAW All-Americans
Championships	Name	Event	Place
1975 Outdoor	Cindy Bremser	Mile run	3rd
1975 Outdoor	Cindy Bremser	2 miles	6th
1976 Outdoor	Bo Williams	4 × 110 yards relay	6th
1976 Outdoor	Sue Tallard	4 × 110 yards relay	6th
1976 Outdoor	Gilda Hudson	4 × 110 yards relay	6th
1976 Outdoor	Randee Burke	4 × 110 yards relay	6th
1977 Outdoor	Marybeth Spencer	3000 meters	4th
1977 Outdoor	Marybeth Spencer	5000 meters	3rd
1978 Indoor	Yvette Hyman	60 yards	6th
1978 Indoor	Yvette Hyman	300 yards	3rd
1978 Indoor	Jane Dwyer	300 yards	5th
1978 Indoor	Brenda Howard	600 yards	2nd
1978 Indoor	Sue Tallard	600 yards	4th
1978 Indoor	Ellen Brewster	1000 yards	2nd
1978 Indoor	Suzie Houston	1000 yards	3rd
1978 Indoor	Suzie Houston	Mile run	2nd
1978 Indoor	Lynn Morin	Mile run	4th
1978 Indoor	Lynn Morin	2 miles	4th
1978 Indoor	Yvette Hyman	4 × 440 yards relay	5th
1978 Indoor	Ellen Brewster	4 × 440 yards relay	5th
1978 Indoor	Brenda Howard	4 × 440 yards relay	5th
1978 Indoor	Sue Tallard	4 × 440 yards relay	5th
1978 Indoor	Mary Grinaker	High jump	3rd
1978 Outdoor	Suzie Houston	1500 meters	5th
1978 Outdoor	Marty Billingsley	4 × 800 meters relay	5th
1978 Outdoor	Suzie Houston	4 × 800 meters relay	5th
1978 Outdoor	Sue Tallard	4 × 800 meters relay	5th
1978 Outdoor	Ellen Brewster	4 × 800 meters relay	5th
1979 Outdoor	Suzie Houston	1500 meters	4th
1979 Outdoor	Pat Johnson	Long jump	2nd
1980 Indoor	Rose Thomson	1000 meters	6th
1980 Indoor	Suzie Houston	2000 meters	3rd
1980 Indoor	Amy Dunlop	4 × 220 yards relay	4th
1980 Indoor	Yvette Hyman	4 × 220 yards relay	4th
1980 Indoor	Pat Johnson	4 × 220 yards relay	4th
1980 Indoor	Pam Moore	4 × 220 yards relay	4th
1980 Indoor	Pam Moore	Distance medley relay	4th
1980 Indoor	Ellen Brewster	Distance medley relay	4th
1980 Indoor	Suzie Houston	Distance medley relay	4th
1980 Indoor	Rose Thomson	Distance medley relay	4th
1980 Indoor	Pat Johnson	Long jump	1st
1980 Outdoor	Pam Moore	400 meters	5th
1980 Outdoor	Rose Thomson	1500 meters	6th
1980 Outdoor	Rose Thomson	3000 meters	2nd
1980 Outdoor	Suzie Houston	4 × 880 yards relay	6th
1980 Outdoor	Sue Beischel	4 × 880 yards relay	6th
1980 Outdoor	Sue Spaltholz	4 × 880 yards relay	6th
1980 Outdoor	Ellen Brewster	4 × 880 yards relay	6th
1980 Outdoor	Pat Johnson	Long jump	2nd
1981 Indoor	Robin Jackson	300 meters	3rd
1981 Indoor	Pam Moore	400 meters	1st
1981 Indoor	Rose Thomson	1000 meters	4th
1981 Indoor	Sue Beischel	4 × 800 meters relay	1st
1981 Indoor	Maryann Brunner	4 × 800 meters relay	1st
1981 Indoor	Ellen Brewster	4 × 800 meters relay	1st
1981 Indoor	Sue Spaltholz	4 × 800 meters relay	1st
1981 Indoor	Sue Spaltholz	Distance medley relay	6th
1981 Indoor	Pam Moore	Distance medley relay	6th
1981 Indoor	Ellen Brewster	Distance medley relay	6th
1981 Indoor	Suzie Houston	Distance medley relay	6th
1981 Indoor	Pat Johnson	Long jump	1st
1981 Outdoor	Sue Beischel	4 × 800 meters relay	1st
1981 Outdoor	Maryann Brunner	4 × 800 meters relay	1st
1981 Outdoor	Ellen Brewster	4 × 800 meters relay	1st
1981 Outdoor	Sue Spaltholz	4 × 800 meters relay	1st
1981 Outdoor	Pat Johnson	Long jump	3rd
1982 Indoor	Maryann Brunner	1000 yards	3rd
1982 Indoor	Kathy Borgwarth	60 yards hurdles	4th
1982 Indoor	Sue Beischel	4 × 880 yards relay	2nd
1982 Indoor	Rose Thomson	4 × 880 yards relay	2nd
1982 Indoor	Maryann Brunner	4 × 880 yards relay	2nd
1982 Indoor	Sue Spaltholz	4 × 880 yards relay	2nd
1982 Indoor	Ellen Olson	Distance medley relay	2nd
1982 Indoor	Mary Mulrooney	Distance medley relay	2nd
1982 Indoor	Maryann Brunner	Distance medley relay	2nd
1982 Indoor	Cathy Branta	Distance medley relay	2nd
1982 Indoor	Pat Johnson	Long jump	2nd
1982 Outdoor	Maryann Brunner	800 meters	5th
1982 Outdoor	Rose Thomson	1500 meters	1st
1982 Outdoor	Cathy Branta	3000 meters	3rd
1982 Indoor	Ellen Olson	4 × 800 meters relay	2nd
1982 Indoor	Sue Beischel	4 × 800 meters relay	2nd
1982 Indoor	Maryann Brunner	4 × 800 meters relay	2nd
1982 Indoor	Rose Thomson	4 × 800 meters relay	2nd
1982 Outdoor	Cheri Essman	High jump	6th
1982 Outdoor	Pat Johnson	Long jump	1st
1982 Outdoor	Kathy Borgwarth	Heptathlon	3rd

=== NCAA ===
As of August 2025, a total of 162 men and 62 women have achieved individual first-team All-American status at the Division I men's outdoor, women's outdoor, men's indoor, or women's indoor national championships (using the modern criteria of top-8 placing regardless of athlete nationality).

First team NCAA All-Americans
Team	Championships	Name	Event	Place	Ref.
Men's	1921 Outdoor	Al Knollin	220 yards hurdles	2nd	
Men's	1921 Outdoor	Ed Johnson	400 meters	5th	
Men's	1921 Outdoor	Clyde Nash	800 meters	3rd	
Men's	1921 Outdoor	George Finkle	3000 meters	5th	
Men's	1921 Outdoor	Lloyd Wilder	Pole vault	1st	
Men's	1921 Outdoor	Dale Merrick	Pole vault	5th	
Men's	1921 Outdoor	Guy Sundt	Long jump	4th	
Men's	1922 Outdoor	George Stolley	220 yards hurdles	4th	
Men's	1922 Outdoor	Ralph Spetz	200 meters	3rd	
Men's	1922 Outdoor	Peter Platten	High jump	5th	
Men's	1922 Outdoor	Dale Merrick	Pole vault	3rd	
Men's	1923 Outdoor	Earl Schneider	Mile run	4th	
Men's	1923 Outdoor	Lionel Tschudy	3000 meters	6th	
Men's	1925 Outdoor	Herb Schwarze	Shot put	3rd	
Men's	1925 Outdoor	Robert Kreuz	Javelin throw	5th	
Men's	1926 Outdoor	Ken Kennedy	400 meters	5th	
Men's	1926 Outdoor	Vic Chapman	3000 meters	3rd	
Men's	1926 Outdoor	Charles McGinnis	High jump	6th	
Men's	1926 Outdoor	Willis Tressler	Hammer throw	6th	
Men's	1926 Outdoor	Robert Kreuz	Javelin throw	6th	
Men's	1927 Outdoor	Fred Stuttle	Javelin throw	6th	
Men's	1928 Outdoor	Ralph Pahlmeyer	110 meters hurdles	4th	
Men's	1928 Outdoor	Charles Bullamore	3000 meters	6th	
Men's	1929 Outdoor	Sam Behr	Shot put	3rd	
Men's	1930 Outdoor	Ted Shaw	High jump	2nd	
Men's	1930 Outdoor	Sam Behr	Shot put	5th	
Men's	1930 Outdoor	Arthur Frisch	Hammer throw	3rd	
Men's	1930 Outdoor	Otto Sell	Hammer throw	6th	
Men's	1931 Outdoor	George Wright	3000 meters	5th	
Men's	1931 Outdoor	Ted Shaw	High jump	3rd	
Men's	1931 Outdoor	Ralph Lovshin	Pole vault	4th	
Men's	1931 Outdoor	Sam Behr	Shot put	2nd	
Men's	1931 Outdoor	Greg Kabat	Discus throw	4th	
Men's	1931 Outdoor	Arthur Frisch	Hammer throw	4th	
Men's	1932 Outdoor	Ed Roden	110 meters hurdles	5th	
Men's	1932 Outdoor	Ted Shaw	High jump	2nd	
Men's	1932 Outdoor	Glenn Nowotny	Javelin throw	6th	
Men's	1933 Outdoor	Ralph Lovshin	Pole vault	5th	
Men's	1936 Outdoor	Jack Kellner	110 meters hurdles	6th	
Men's	1936 Outdoor	Chuck Fenske	1500 meters	2nd	
Men's	1936 Outdoor	Albert Haller	Pole vault	3rd	
Men's	1936 Outdoor	Irwin Rebow	Shot put	4th	
Men's	1937 Outdoor	Chuck Fenske	Mile run	1st	
Men's	1937 Outdoor	Albert Haller	Pole vault	5th	
Men's	1938 Outdoor	Chuck Fenske	Mile run	2nd	
Men's	1938 Outdoor	Walter Mehl	3000 meters	1st	
Men's	1938 Outdoor	Milton Padway	Pole vault	2nd	
Men's	1939 Outdoor	Ed Smith	110 meters hurdles	2nd	
Men's	1939 Outdoor	Walter Mehl	Mile run	2nd	
Men's	1939 Outdoor	Milton Padway	Pole vault	2nd	
Men's	1940 Outdoor	Bill Williams	Pole vault	2nd	
Men's	1941 Outdoor	Howard Schoenike	3000 meters	4th	
Men's	1942 Outdoor	Robert Hogdell	High jump	6th	
Men's	1942 Outdoor	Bill Williams	Pole vault	6th	
Men's	1942 Outdoor	Robert Beirle	Discus throw	4th	
Men's	1943 Outdoor	Robert Hogdell	High jump	2nd	
Men's	1943 Outdoor	Jim McFadzean	Long jump	5th	
Men's	1944 Outdoor	Kenton Brown	100 meters	5th	
Men's	1944 Outdoor	Ray Patterson	High jump	4th	
Men's	1944 Outdoor	Bob Ray	Javelin throw	1st	
Men's	1945 Outdoor	Bill Lawson	3000 meters	6th	
Men's	1945 Outdoor	Charles Martin	High jump	4th	
Men's	1945 Outdoor	Edwin Levine	Pole vault	5th	
Men's	1945 Outdoor	Max Kelly	Pole vault	5th	
Men's	1945 Outdoor	George Fuchs	Shot put	6th	
Men's	1946 Outdoor	Lloyd Labeah	100 meters	2nd	
Men's	1946 Outdoor	Lloyd Labeach	200 meters	2nd	
Men's	1946 Outdoor	Alec Scott	Pole vault	4th	
Men's	1946 Outdoor	Lloyd Labeach	Long jump	6th	
Men's	1947 Outdoor	Richard Houden	100 meters	5th	
Men's	1947 Outdoor	Richard Houden	200 meters	6th	
Men's	1947 Outdoor	Don Gehrmann	Mile run	4th	
Men's	1948 Outdoor	Don Gehrmann	1500 meters	1st	
Men's	1949 Outdoor	Don Gehrmann	Mile run	1st	
Men's	1949 Outdoor	Jim Urquhart	3000 meters	4th	
Men's	1949 Outdoor	Tom Bennett	Pole vault	2nd	
Men's	1949 Outdoor	George Kailas	Long jump	6th	
Men's	1950 Outdoor	Leroy Collins	400 meters	7th	
Men's	1950 Outdoor	Don Gehrmann	Mile run	1st	
Men's	1951 Outdoor	Ted Bleckwenn	Discus throw	8th	
Men's	1952 Outdoor	Walt Deike	10,000 meters	1st	
Men's	1957 Outdoor	Jesse Nixon	400 meters	5th	
Men's	1957 Outdoor	Sam Mylin	High jump	8th	
Men's	1958 Outdoor	Jesse Nixon	400 meters	7th	
Men's	1962 Outdoor	Elmars Ezerins	Discus throw	8th	
Men's	1963 Outdoor	Elzie Higginbottom	400 meters	5th	
Men's	1963 Outdoor	Elmars Ezerins	Discus throw	8th	
Men's	1964 Outdoor	Al Montalbano	400 meters hurdles	8th	
Men's	1964 Outdoor	Don Hendrickson	Discus throw	6th	
Men's	1965 Indoor	Bill Holden	High jump	3rd	
Men's	1965 Outdoor	Bill Holden	High jump	7th	
Men's	1967 Indoor	Mike Butler	55 meters hurdles	3rd	
Men's	1967 Indoor	Rickey Poole	800 meters	4th	
Men's	1967 Indoor	Ken Latigo-Olal	800 meters	5th	
Men's	1967 Indoor	Ray Arrington	1000 meters	1st	
Men's	1967 Indoor	Bob Hawke	Shot put	5th	
Men's	1968 Indoor	Mike Butler	55 meters hurdles	5th	
Men's	1968 Indoor	Ray Arrington	1000 meters	1st	
Men's	1968 Outdoor	Mike Butler	110 meters hurdles	3rd	
Men's	1968 Outdoor	Ray Arrington	800 meters	4th	
Men's	1969 Indoor	Ray Arrington	1000 meters	1st	
Men's	1969 Outdoor	Mark Winzenried	800 meters	5th	
Men's	1970 Indoor	Mark Winzenried	800 meters	1st	
Men's	1970 Indoor	Chuck Baker	800 meters	5th	
Men's	1970 Indoor	Chuck Baker	Distance medley relay	4th	
Men's	1970 Indoor	Tom Young	Distance medley relay	4th	
Men's	1970 Indoor	Don Vandrey	Distance medley relay	4th	
Men's	1970 Indoor	Mark Winzenried	Distance medley relay	4th	
Men's	1970 Indoor	Pat Matzdorf	High jump	3rd	
Men's	1970 Indoor	Greg Johnson	Long jump	4th	
Men's	1970 Outdoor	Mark Winzenried	800 meters	4th	
Men's	1970 Outdoor	Pat Matzdorf	High jump	1st	
Men's	1971 Indoor	Mark Winzenried	800 meters	1st	
Men's	1971 Indoor	Pat Matzdorf	High jump	1st	
Men's	1971 Indoor	Greg Johnson	Long jump	4th	
Men's	1971 Indoor	Patrick Onyango Sumba	Triple jump	5th	
Men's	1971 Outdoor	Mark Winzenried	800 meters	1st	
Men's	1971 Outdoor	Pat Matzdorf	High jump	5th	
Men's	1972 Indoor	Pat Matzdorf	High jump	2nd	
Men's	1972 Outdoor	Mark Larson	3000 meters steeplechase	4th	
Men's	1972 Outdoor	Glenn Herold	5000 meters	4th	
Men's	1973 Indoor	Skip Kent	600 yards	2nd	
Men's	1973 Indoor	Glenn Herold	3000 meters	2nd	
Men's	1973 Outdoor	Skip Kent	800 meters	1st	
Men's	1975 Indoor	Mark Johnson	5000 meters	4th	
Men's	1975 Indoor	Kim Scott	Pole vault	4th	
Men's	1975 Outdoor	Kim Scott	Pole vault	6th	
Men's	1976 Indoor	Mark Randall	4 × 800 meters relay	1st	
Men's	1976 Indoor	Steve Lacy	4 × 800 meters relay	1st	
Men's	1976 Indoor	Mark Sang	4 × 800 meters relay	1st	
Men's	1976 Indoor	Dick Moss	4 × 800 meters relay	1st	
Men's	1976 Outdoor	Steve Lacy	1500 meters	4th	
Men's	1977 Indoor	Steve Lacy	3000 meters	5th	
Men's	1977 Outdoor	Mike Murei	400 meters hurdles	6th	
Men's	1978 Indoor	Steve Lacy	Mile run	4th	
Men's	1978 Indoor	Mike Murei	Distance medley relay	2nd	
Men's	1978 Indoor	Mark Sang	Distance medley relay	2nd	
Men's	1978 Indoor	Randy Jackson	Distance medley relay	2nd	
Men's	1978 Indoor	Jim Stintzi	Distance medley relay	2nd	
Men's	1978 Outdoor	Steve Lacy	1500 meters	3rd	
Men's	1978 Outdoor	Randy Jackson	3000 meters steeplechase	8th	
Men's	1979 Indoor	Jim Stintzi	3000 meters	2nd	
Men's	1979 Indoor	Jeff Braun	Shot put	3rd	
Men's	1979 Outdoor	Randy Jackson	3000 meters steeplechase	6th	
Men's	1979 Outdoor	Jim Stintzi	5000 meters	5th	
Men's	1980 Outdoor	Randy Jackson	3000 meters steeplechase	1st	
Men's	1981 Indoor	Jim Stintzi	3000 meters	4th	
Men's	1981 Outdoor	Jim Stintzi	5000 meters	5th	
Men's	1982 Indoor	Jack Hoffman	4 × 800 meters relay	5th	
Men's	1982 Indoor	Chris Deakin	4 × 800 meters relay	5th	
Men's	1982 Indoor	Rick Rurriff	4 × 800 meters relay	5th	
Men's	1982 Indoor	Joe Kapheim	4 × 800 meters relay	5th	
Men's	1982 Indoor	Jeff Loker	Distance medley relay	6th	
Men's	1982 Indoor	Luis Curet	Distance medley relay	6th	
Men's	1982 Indoor	Tim Hacker	Distance medley relay	6th	
Men's	1982 Indoor	Jeff Hacker	Distance medley relay	6th	
Women's	1983 Indoor	Cathy Branta	3000 meters	5th	
Women's	1983 Indoor	Ellen Olson	4 × 800 meters relay	1st	
Women's	1983 Indoor	Mary Anne Brunner	4 × 800 meters relay	1st	
Women's	1983 Indoor	Sue Spaltholz	4 × 800 meters relay	1st	
Women's	1983 Indoor	Rose Thompson	4 × 800 meters relay	1st	
Women's	1983 Outdoor	Katie Ishmael	5000 meters	5th	
Men's	1984 Indoor	Joe Kapheim	Distance medley relay	2nd	
Men's	1984 Indoor	Wayne Roby	Distance medley relay	2nd	
Men's	1984 Indoor	Dan Volkey	Distance medley relay	2nd	
Men's	1984 Indoor	Tim Hacker	Distance medley relay	2nd	
Men's	1984 Indoor	Al Toon	Triple jump	6th	
Women's	1984 Indoor	Cathy Branta	3000 meters	1st	
Women's	1984 Indoor	Kathleen Ishmael	3000 meters	5th	
Women's	1984 Indoor	Dorothea Brown	Long jump	6th	
Men's	1984 Outdoor	Don Volkey	1500 meters	6th	
Men's	1984 Outdoor	Tim Hacker	5000 meters	4th	
Men's	1984 Outdoor	John Easker	10,000 meters	5th	
Men's	1984 Outdoor	Al Toon	Triple jump	8th	
Women's	1984 Outdoor	Cathy Branta	3000 meters	1st	
Women's	1984 Outdoor	Katie Ishmael	10,000 meters	2nd	
Women's	1984 Outdoor	Dorothea Brown	Long jump	7th	
Women's	1984 Outdoor	Sharon Dollins	Triple jump	4th	
Women's	1984 Outdoor	Karen Nitsch	Shot put	7th	
Men's	1985 Indoor	Wayne Roby	55 meters hurdles	6th	
Men's	1985 Indoor	Patrick Ames	Distance medley relay	1st	
Men's	1985 Indoor	Robert Hackett	Distance medley relay	1st	
Men's	1985 Indoor	John Easker	Distance medley relay	1st	
Men's	1985 Indoor	Tim Hacker	Distance medley relay	1st	
Women's	1985 Indoor	Kathleen Ishmael	3000 meters	2nd	
Women's	1985 Indoor	Kathy Lefebvre	4 × 800 meters relay	6th	
Women's	1985 Indoor	Tammy Keskinen	4 × 800 meters relay	6th	
Women's	1985 Indoor	Kristi Kroop	4 × 800 meters relay	6th	
Women's	1985 Indoor	Carole Harris	4 × 800 meters relay	6th	
Men's	1985 Outdoor	Wayne Roby	110 meters hurdles	2nd	
Men's	1985 Outdoor	Tim Hacker	1500 meters	2nd	
Men's	1985 Outdoor	John Easker	5000 meters	5th	
Women's	1985 Outdoor	Cathy Branta	1500 meters	1st	
Women's	1985 Outdoor	Cathy Branta	3000 meters	1st	
Women's	1986 Indoor	Stephanie Herbst	3000 meters	1st	
Women's	1986 Outdoor	Stephanie Herbst	5000 meters	1st	
Women's	1986 Outdoor	Lori Wolter	5000 meters	8th	
Women's	1986 Outdoor	Stephanie Herbst	10,000 meters	1st	
Women's	1986 Outdoor	Dorothea Brown	Long jump	5th	
Women's	1987 Indoor	Suzy Favor	Mile run	1st	
Women's	1987 Indoor	Carole Harris	Mile run	8th	
Women's	1987 Indoor	Lori Wolter	3000 meters	8th	
Men's	1987 Outdoor	Scott Fry	5000 meters	4th	
Women's	1987 Outdoor	Suzy Favor	1500 meters	1st	
Women's	1987 Outdoor	Holly Hering	10,000 meters	3rd	
Women's	1988 Indoor	Carole Harris	4 × 800 meters relay	2nd	
Women's	1988 Indoor	Julie Schiltz	4 × 800 meters relay	2nd	
Women's	1988 Indoor	Sue Gentes	4 × 800 meters relay	2nd	
Women's	1988 Indoor	Suzy Favor	4 × 800 meters relay	2nd	
Men's	1988 Outdoor	Rusy Korhonen	3000 meters steeplechase	7th	
Men's	1988 Outdoor	Chris Borsa	10,000 meters	4th	
Women's	1988 Outdoor	Suzy Favor	1500 meters	1st	
Women's	1988 Outdoor	Stephanie Herbst	10,000 meters	2nd	
Women's	1989 Indoor	Suzy Favor	1500 meters	th	
Women's	1989 Indoor	Suzy Favor	Mile run	1st	
Men's	1989 Outdoor	Rusty Korhonen	3000 meters steeplechase	5th	
Men's	1989 Outdoor	Scott Fry	5000 meters	7th	
Men's	1989 Outdoor	Paul Schoensee	10,000 meters	3rd	
Women's	1989 Outdoor	Tracey Mattes	400 meters hurdles	8th	
Women's	1989 Outdoor	Suzy Favor	1500 meters	1st	
Women's	1989 Outdoor	Maureen Hartzheim	3000 meters	6th	
Women's	1989 Outdoor	Amy Howe	3000 meters	8th	
Women's	1990 Indoor	Suzy Favor	Mile run	1st	
Women's	1990 Indoor	Suzy Favor	3000 meters	1st	
Women's	1990 Indoor	Lisa Payne	Long jump	3rd	
Men's	1990 Outdoor	Donovan Bergstrom	3000 meters steeplechase	4th	
Men's	1990 Outdoor	Scott Fry	10,000 meters	5th	
Women's	1990 Outdoor	Tracey Mattes	400 meters hurdles	6th	
Women's	1990 Outdoor	Suzy Favor	800 meters	1st	
Women's	1990 Outdoor	Suzy Favor	1500 meters	1st	
Women's	1990 Outdoor	Mary Hartzheim	3000 meters	2nd	
Women's	1990 Outdoor	Maureen Hartzheim	3000 meters	3rd	
Women's	1990 Outdoor	Pam Hinton	5000 meters	4th	
Men's	1991 Indoor	Mike Raemisch	800 meters	6th	
Women's	1991 Indoor	Lisa Payne	Long jump	2nd	
Men's	1991 Outdoor	Eric Stabb	5000 meters	6th	
Women's	1991 Outdoor	Clare Eichner	3000 meters	6th	
Women's	1991 Outdoor	Jenny Kraeger	10,000 meters	7th	
Women's	1992 Indoor	Amy Wickus	800 meters	5th	
Women's	1992 Indoor	Claire Eichner	3000 meters	2nd	
Women's	1992 Indoor	Sarah Renk	4 × 800 meters relay	1st	
Women's	1992 Indoor	Julie Cote	4 × 800 meters relay	1st	
Women's	1992 Indoor	Sue Gentes	4 × 800 meters relay	1st	
Women's	1992 Indoor	Amy Wickus	4 × 800 meters relay	1st	
Men's	1992 Outdoor	Mike Raemisch	800 meters	2nd	
Men's	1992 Outdoor	Donovan Bergstrom	3000 meters steeplechase	2nd	
Men's	1992 Outdoor	Jason Casiano	5000 meters	7th	
Women's	1992 Outdoor	Amy Wickus	800 meters	6th	
Women's	1992 Outdoor	Sue Gentes	1500 meters	1st	
Women's	1992 Outdoor	Sarah Renk	1500 meters	5th	
Women's	1992 Outdoor	Clare Eichner	3000 meters	5th	
Women's	1993 Indoor	Amy Wickus	800 meters	1st	
Women's	1993 Indoor	Kim Sherman	800 meters	5th	
Women's	1993 Indoor	Clare Eichner	Mile run	1st	
Women's	1993 Indoor	Sarah Renk	Mile run	5th	
Women's	1993 Indoor	Clare Eichner	3000 meters	1st	
Women's	1993 Indoor	Sarah Renk	4 × 800 meters relay	1st	
Women's	1993 Indoor	Julie Cote	4 × 800 meters relay	1st	
Women's	1993 Indoor	Kim Sherman	4 × 800 meters relay	1st	
Women's	1993 Indoor	Amy Wickus	4 × 800 meters relay	1st	
Men's	1993 Outdoor	Jerry Schumacher	1500 meters	5th	
Men's	1993 Outdoor	Donovan Bergstrom	3000 meters steeplechase	1st	
Men's	1993 Outdoor	Jason Casiano	5000 meters	5th	
Women's	1993 Outdoor	Kim Sherman	800 meters	1st	
Women's	1993 Outdoor	Amy Wickus	800 meters	2nd	
Women's	1993 Outdoor	Sara Renk	800 meters	6th	
Women's	1993 Outdoor	Clare Eichner	1500 meters	1st	
Women's	1993 Outdoor	Sarah Renk	1500 meters	6th	
Women's	1993 Outdoor	Clare Eichner	3000 meters	1st	
Men's	1994 Indoor	Reggie Torian	Long jump	6th	
Women's	1994 Indoor	Amy Wickus	800 meters	1st	
Women's	1994 Indoor	Jen Metz	Distance medley relay	6th	
Women's	1994 Indoor	Jennifer Watson	Distance medley relay	6th	
Women's	1994 Indoor	Julie Cote	Distance medley relay	6th	
Women's	1994 Indoor	Amy Wickus	Distance medley relay	6th	
Men's	1994 Outdoor	James Menon	10,000 meters	7th	
Men's	1994 Outdoor	Louis Hinshaw	Decathlon	8th	
Women's	1994 Outdoor	Amy Wickus	800 meters	2nd	
Women's	1994 Outdoor	Amy Wickus	1500 meters	2nd	
Men's	1995 Indoor	Reggie Torian	55 meters hurdles	2nd	
Men's	1995 Indoor	James Menon	5000 meters	5th	
Women's	1995 Indoor	Amy Wickus	800 meters	1st	
Women's	1995 Indoor	Kathy Butler	Mile run	7th	
Women's	1995 Indoor	Jen Metz	Distance medley relay	3rd	
Women's	1995 Indoor	Jenny Paynter	Distance medley relay	3rd	
Women's	1995 Indoor	Julie Cote	Distance medley relay	3rd	
Women's	1995 Indoor	Amy Wickus	Distance medley relay	3rd	
Men's	1995 Outdoor	Jason Casiano	5000 meters	7th	
Men's	1995 Outdoor	James Menon	10,000 meters	3rd	
Women's	1995 Outdoor	Amy Wickus	1500 meters	1st	
Women's	1995 Outdoor	Julie Cote	1500 meters	8th	
Women's	1995 Outdoor	Kathy Butler	3000 meters	1st	
Women's	1995 Outdoor	Camille Williams	High jump	7th	
Men's	1996 Indoor	Jason Casiano	5000 meters	1st	
Men's	1996 Indoor	James Menon	5000 meters	5th	
Men's	1996 Indoor	Tom Agger	Distance medley relay	5th	
Men's	1996 Indoor	Carlton Clark	Distance medley relay	5th	
Men's	1996 Indoor	Jason Casiano	Distance medley relay	5th	
Men's	1996 Indoor	Mark Hauser	Distance medley relay	5th	
Women's	1996 Indoor	Kathy Butler	5000 meters	2nd	
Women's	1996 Indoor	Angie Kujak	5000 meters	7th	
Women's	1996 Indoor	Markesha McWilliams	Distance medley relay	1st	
Women's	1996 Indoor	Jenni Westphal	Distance medley relay	1st	
Women's	1996 Indoor	Janet Westphal	Distance medley relay	1st	
Women's	1996 Indoor	Kathy Butler	Distance medley relay	1st	
Men's	1996 Outdoor	Reggie Torian	110 meters hurdles	2nd	
Men's	1996 Outdoor	Pascal Dobert	3000 meters steeplechase	2nd	
Men's	1996 Outdoor	James Menon	10,000 meters	3rd	
Men's	1996 Outdoor	James Dunkleberger	Decathlon	5th	
Women's	1996 Outdoor	Jenni Westphal	800 meters	4th	
Women's	1996 Outdoor	Kathy Butler	1500 meters	4th	
Women's	1996 Outdoor	Kathy Butler	3000 meters	1st	
Women's	1996 Outdoor	Camille Williams	High jump	3rd	
Men's	1997 Indoor	Jeremy Fischer	High jump	6th	
Women's	1997 Indoor	Jenni Westphal	800 meters	5th	
Women's	1997 Indoor	Janet Westphal	800 meters	7th	
Women's	1997 Indoor	Kathy Butler	Mile run	3rd	
Women's	1997 Indoor	Sara Fredrickson	3000 meters	2nd	
Women's	1997 Indoor	Kathy Butler	5000 meters	2nd	
Women's	1997 Indoor	Angie Kujak	5000 meters	4th	
Women's	1997 Indoor	Maxine Clarke	Distance medley relay	1st	
Women's	1997 Indoor	Ayana Wright	Distance medley relay	1st	
Women's	1997 Indoor	Amy Ross	Distance medley relay	1st	
Women's	1997 Indoor	Miesha Marzell	Distance medley relay	1st	
Men's	1997 Outdoor	Reggie Torian	110 meters hurdles	1st	
Men's	1997 Outdoor	Pascal Dobert	3000 meters steeplechase	1st	
Men's	1997 Outdoor	Andy Bosley	5000 meters	8th	
Men's	1997 Outdoor	James Dunkleberger	Decathlon	1st	
Women's	1997 Outdoor	Kathy Butler	1500 meters	3rd	
Women's	1997 Outdoor	Kathy Butler	3000 meters	1st	
Women's	1997 Outdoor	Angie Kujak	10,000 meters	3rd	
Men's	1998 Indoor	Matt Rodgers	400 meters	8th	
Men's	1998 Indoor	Steve Fein	3000 meters	5th	
Men's	1998 Indoor	Jeremy Fischer	High jump	5th	
Women's	1998 Indoor	Jenni Westphal	800 meters	7th	
Women's	1998 Indoor	Becky Schaefer	Mile run	4th	
Women's	1998 Indoor	Angi Kujak	5000 meters	4th	
Women's	1998 Indoor	Janet Westphal	Distance medley relay	2nd	
Women's	1998 Indoor	April Beard	Distance medley relay	2nd	
Women's	1998 Indoor	Stephanie Pesch	Distance medley relay	2nd	
Women's	1998 Indoor	Jenni Westphal	Distance medley relay	2nd	
Men's	1998 Outdoor	Jeremy Fischer	High jump	2nd	
Men's	1998 Outdoor	Greg Gill	Decathlon	6th	
Women's	1998 Outdoor	Sara Fredrickson	3000 meters	3rd	
Women's	1998 Outdoor	Angie Kujak	5000 meters	7th	
Women's	1998 Outdoor	Angie Kujak	10,000 meters	2nd	
Men's	1999 Indoor	Lenton Herring	Triple jump	4th	
Women's	1999 Indoor	Bethany Brewster	Mile run	5th	
Women's	1999 Indoor	Jenelle Deatherage	Mile run	6th	
Women's	1999 Indoor	Jenelle Deatherage	3000 meters	5th	
Women's	1999 Indoor	Erica Palmer	3000 meters	6th	
Women's	1999 Indoor	Erica Palmer	5000 meters	2nd	
Women's	1999 Outdoor	Janet Westphal	1500 meters	5th	
Women's	1999 Outdoor	Jenelle Deatherage	3000 meters	7th	
Men's	2000 Indoor	Jay Schoenfelder	3000 meters	8th	
Men's	2000 Indoor	Lenton Herring	Triple jump	7th	
Women's	2000 Indoor	Stephanie Pesch	Mile run	6th	
Men's	2000 Outdoor	Jared Cordes	3000 meters steeplechase	5th	
Men's	2000 Outdoor	Matt Downin	10,000 meters	8th	
Men's	2000 Outdoor	Anders Holmstrom	Shot put	6th	
Women's	2000 Outdoor	Stephanie Pesch	1500 meters	6th	
Women's	2000 Outdoor	Erica Palmer	10,000 meters	5th	
Women's	2000 Outdoor	Andrea Guertsen	Heptathlon	7th	
Men's	2001 Indoor	T.J. Nelson	60 meters hurdles	8th	
Men's	2001 Indoor	Jared Cordes	5000 meters	8th	
Men's	2001 Indoor	Lenton Henning	Triple jump	3rd	
Women's	2001 Indoor	Bethany Brewster	3000 meters	3rd	
Men's	2002 Indoor	Isaiah Festa	Distance medley relay	2nd	
Men's	2002 Indoor	Dan Murray	Distance medley relay	2nd	
Men's	2002 Indoor	Jabari Pride	Distance medley relay	2nd	
Men's	2002 Indoor	Josh Spiker	Distance medley relay	2nd	
Men's	2002 Outdoor	Dan Murray	800 meters	8th	
Men's	2002 Outdoor	Josh Spiker	1500 meters	3rd	
Men's	2002 Outdoor	Nick Winkel	10,000 meters	8th	
Men's	2002 Outdoor	Len Herring	Triple jump	5th	
Women's	2002 Outdoor	Bethany Brewster	1500 meters	7th	
Men's	2003 Indoor	Isaiah Festa	Distance medley relay	5th	
Men's	2003 Indoor	Jvontai Hanserd	Distance medley relay	5th	
Men's	2003 Indoor	Dan Murray	Distance medley relay	5th	
Men's	2003 Indoor	Josh Spiker	Distance medley relay	5th	
Women's	2003 Indoor	Hilary Edmondson	Distance medley relay	7th	
Women's	2003 Indoor	Andrea Geurtsen	Distance medley relay	7th	
Women's	2003 Indoor	Tara Halls	Distance medley relay	7th	
Women's	2003 Indoor	Bethany Brewster	Distance medley relay	7th	
Men's	2003 Outdoor	Isaiah Festa	3000 meters steeplechase	4th	
Men's	2003 Outdoor	Ryan Tremelling	Decathlon	8th	
Women's	2003 Outdoor	Bethany Brewster	1500 meters	6th	
Men's	2004 Indoor	Matt Tegenkamp	3000 meters	3rd	
Men's	2004 Indoor	Chris Solinsky	3000 meters	6th	
Men's	2004 Indoor	Simon Bairu	3000 meters	8th	
Men's	2004 Indoor	Matt Tegenkamp	5000 meters	5th	
Men's	2004 Indoor	Simon Bairu	5000 meters	6th	
Men's	2004 Indoor	Chris Solinsky	Distance medley relay	8th	
Men's	2004 Indoor	Jvontai Hanserd	Distance medley relay	8th	
Men's	2004 Indoor	Joe Detmer	Distance medley relay	8th	
Men's	2004 Indoor	Josh Spiker	Distance medley relay	8th	
Men's	2004 Indoor	Ashraf Fadel	Heptathlon	8th	
Women's	2004 Indoor	Hilary Edmondson	Mile run	4th	
Men's	2004 Outdoor	Demi Omole	100 meters	5th	
Men's	2004 Outdoor	Josh Spiker	1500 meters	6th	
Men's	2004 Outdoor	Matt Tegenkamp	5000 meters	3rd	
Men's	2004 Outdoor	Simon Bairu	10,000 meters	3rd	
Men's	2004 Outdoor	Ashraf Fadel	Decathlon	6th	
Women's	2004 Outdoor	Hilary Edmondson	1500 meters	5th	
Men's	2005 Indoor	Demi Omole	60 meters	4th	
Men's	2005 Indoor	Chris Solinsky	3000 meters	1st	
Men's	2005 Indoor	Matt Tegenkamp	3000 meters	3rd	
Men's	2005 Indoor	Chris Solinsky	5000 meters	3rd	
Men's	2005 Indoor	Matt Tegenkamp	5000 meters	5th	
Men's	2005 Indoor	Ben Gregory	Distance medley relay	3rd	
Men's	2005 Indoor	Joe Detmer	Distance medley relay	3rd	
Men's	2005 Indoor	Dan Murray	Distance medley relay	3rd	
Men's	2005 Indoor	Josh Spiker	Distance medley relay	3rd	
Men's	2005 Indoor	Alonzo Moore	Triple jump	3rd	
Men's	2005 Outdoor	Demi Omole	100 meters	3rd	
Men's	2005 Outdoor	Matt Tegenkamp	5000 meters	5th	
Men's	2005 Outdoor	Chris Solinsky	5000 meters	8th	
Men's	2005 Outdoor	Tim Nelson	10,000 meters	8th	
Men's	2006 Indoor	Demi Omole	60 meters	3rd	
Men's	2006 Indoor	Chris Solinsky	3000 meters	1st	
Men's	2006 Indoor	Chris Solinsky	5000 meters	3rd	
Women's	2006 Indoor	Katrina Rundhaug	5000 meters	7th	
Men's	2006 Outdoor	Demi Omole	100 meters	3rd	
Men's	2006 Outdoor	Chris Solinsky	5000 meters	1st	
Men's	2006 Outdoor	Simon Bairu	10,000 meters	3rd	
Men's	2006 Outdoor	Tim Nelson	10,000 meters	6th	
Men's	2006 Outdoor	Joe Detmer	Decathlon	4th	
Men's	2007 Indoor	Demi Omole	60 meters	2nd	
Men's	2007 Indoor	Chris Solinsky	3000 meters	2nd	
Men's	2007 Indoor	Chris Solinsky	5000 meters	1st	
Men's	2007 Indoor	Tim Nelson	5000 meters	5th	
Men's	2007 Indoor	Craig Miller	Distance medley relay	3rd	
Men's	2007 Indoor	James Groce	Distance medley relay	3rd	
Men's	2007 Indoor	Joe Pierre	Distance medley relay	3rd	
Men's	2007 Indoor	Jack Bolas	Distance medley relay	3rd	
Men's	2007 Indoor	Joe Detmer	Heptathlon	5th	
Women's	2007 Indoor	Melissa Talbor	Pentathlon	3rd	
Men's	2007 Outdoor	Chris Solinsky	5000 meters	1st	
Men's	2007 Outdoor	Tim Nelson	10,000 meters	5th	
Men's	2007 Outdoor	Joe Detmer	Decathlon	2nd	
Men's	2008 Indoor	Craig Miller	Distance medley relay	3rd	
Men's	2008 Indoor	James Groce	Distance medley relay	3rd	
Men's	2008 Indoor	Evan Jager	Distance medley relay	3rd	
Men's	2008 Indoor	Jack Bolas	Distance medley relay	3rd	
Women's	2008 Indoor	Ann Detmer	Mile run	8th	
Women's	2008 Indoor	Katrina Rundhaug	5000 meters	5th	
Men's	2008 Outdoor	Jack Bolas	1500 meters	3rd	
Men's	2008 Outdoor	Craig Miller	1500 meters	4th	
Men's	2008 Outdoor	Evan Jager	1500 meters	8th	
Women's	2008 Outdoor	Gwen Jorgensen	5000 meters	7th	
Women's	2008 Outdoor	Katrina Rundhaug	10,000 meters	5th	
Women's	2008 Outdoor	Jenny Soceka	Pole vault	7th	
Men's	2009 Indoor	Craig Miller	Mile run	2nd	
Men's	2010 Indoor	Zach Mellon	800 meters	5th	
Men's	2010 Indoor	Craig Miller	3000 meters	5th	
Women's	2010 Indoor	Dorcas Akinniyi	Pentathlon	7th	
Men's	2010 Outdoor	Jack Bolas	1500 meters	4th	
Men's	2010 Outdoor	Craig Miller	1500 meters	7th	
Men's	2010 Outdoor	Mohammed Ahmed	10,000 meters	4th	
Women's	2010 Outdoor	Jenny Soceka	Pole vault	8th	
Women's	2010 Outdoor	Dorcas Akinniyi	Heptathlon	5th	
Men's	2011 Indoor	Zach Beth	800 meters	8th	
Men's	2011 Indoor	Maverick Darling	5000 meters	7th	
Women's	2011 Indoor	Dorcas Akinniyi	Pentathlon	4th	
Women's	2011 Outdoor	Dorcas Akinniyi	Heptathlon	6th	
Women's	2011 Outdoor	Jessica Flax	Heptathlon	7th	
Men's	2012 Indoor	Japheth Cato	Heptathlon	2nd	
Women's	2012 Indoor	Kelsey Card	Shot put	6th	
Women's	2012 Indoor	Dorcas Akinniyi	Pentathlon	2nd	
Men's	2012 Outdoor	Rob Finnerty	1500 meters	5th	
Men's	2012 Outdoor	Mohammed Ahmed	5000 meters	7th	
Men's	2012 Outdoor	Elliot Krause	10,000 meters	6th	
Women's	2012 Outdoor	Jessica Flax	Heptathlon	4th	
Women's	2012 Outdoor	Dorcas Akinniyi	Heptathlon	8th	
Men's	2013 Indoor	Austin Mudd	Mile run	3rd	
Men's	2013 Indoor	Maverick Darling	5000 meters	4th	
Men's	2013 Indoor	Mohammed Ahmed	5000 meters	5th	
Men's	2013 Indoor	Danny Block	Shot put	3rd	
Men's	2013 Indoor	Japheth Cato	Heptathlon	2nd	
Men's	2013 Indoor	Zach Ziemek	Heptathlon	5th	
Women's	2013 Indoor	Taylor Smith	Weight throw	7th	
Women's	2013 Indoor	Jessica Flax	Pentathlon	8th	
Men's	2013 Outdoor	Austin Mudd	1500 meters	4th	
Men's	2013 Outdoor	Maverick Darling	5000 meters	4th	
Men's	2013 Outdoor	Reed Connor	5000 meters	6th	
Men's	2013 Outdoor	Danny Block	Shot put	6th	
Men's	2014 Indoor	Reed Connor	5000 meters	8th	
Men's	2014 Indoor	Danny Block	Shot put	7th	
Men's	2014 Indoor	Michael Lihrman	Weight throw	1st	
Men's	2014 Indoor	Zach Ziemek	Heptathlon	5th	
Women's	2014 Indoor	Deanna Latham	Pentathlon	5th	
Men's	2014 Outdoor	Mohammed Ahmed	5000 meters	5th	
Men's	2014 Outdoor	Mohammed Ahmed	10,000 meters	3rd	
Men's	2014 Outdoor	Michael Lihrman	Hammer throw	3rd	
Men's	2014 Outdoor	Zach Ziemek	Decathlon	5th	
Men's	2015 Indoor	Michael Lihrman	Weight throw	1st	
Women's	2015 Indoor	Sarah Disanza	5000 meters	3rd	
Women's	2015 Indoor	Kelsey Card	Shot put	4th	
Women's	2015 Indoor	Georgia Ellenwood	Pentathlon	8th	
Men's	2015 Outdoor	Malachy Schrobilgen	10,000 meters	8th	
Women's	2015 Outdoor	Kelsey Card	Shot put	2nd	
Women's	2015 Outdoor	Kelsey Card	Discus throw	2nd	
Men's	2016 Indoor	Zach Ziemek	Heptathlon	1st	
Women's	2016 Indoor	Kelsey Card	Shot put	5th	
Women's	2016 Indoor	Georgia Ellenwood	Pentathlon	4th	
Men's	2016 Outdoor	Morgan McDonald	5000 meters	5th	
Women's	2016 Outdoor	Kelsey Card	Shot put	4th	
Women's	2016 Outdoor	Kelsey Card	Discus throw	1st	
Men's	2017 Indoor	Riley Budde	Weight throw	8th	
Women's	2017 Indoor	Georgia Ellenwood	Pentathlon	7th	
Women's	2017 Outdoor	Sarah Disanza	5000 meters	7th	
Men's	2018 Indoor	Ollie Hoare	3000 meters	8th	
Men's	2018 Indoor	Joe Hardy	Distance medley relay	6th	
Men's	2018 Indoor	Corbin Ellis	Distance medley relay	6th	
Men's	2018 Indoor	Eric Brown	Distance medley relay	6th	
Men's	2018 Indoor	Ollie Hoare	Distance medley relay	6th	
Women's	2018 Indoor	Georgia Ellenwood	Pentathlon	3rd	
Men's	2018 Outdoor	Ollie Hoare	1500 meters	1st	
Women's	2018 Outdoor	Taylor Amann	Pole vault	7th	
Women's	2018 Outdoor	Georgia Ellenwood	Heptathlon	1st	
Men's	2019 Indoor	Ollie Hoare	Mile run	3rd	
Men's	2019 Indoor	Morgan McDonald	3000 meters	1st	
Men's	2019 Indoor	Morgan McDonald	5000 meters	1st	
Men's	2019 Indoor	Ollie Hoare	Distance medley relay	7th	
Men's	2019 Indoor	Ryan Dundun	Distance medley relay	7th	
Men's	2019 Indoor	Eric Brown	Distance medley relay	7th	
Men's	2019 Indoor	Olin Hacker	Distance medley relay	7th	
Men's	2019 Indoor	Trent Nytes	Heptathlon	7th	
Women's	2019 Indoor	Alicia Monson	5000 meters	1st	
Men's	2019 Outdoor	Ollie Hoare	1500 meters	4th	
Men's	2019 Outdoor	Morgan McDonald	5000 meters	1st	
Men's	2019 Outdoor	Trent Nytes	Decathlon	8th	
Women's	2019 Outdoor	Amy Davis	10,000 meters	8th	
Women's	2021 Outdoor	Josie Schaefer	Shot put	2nd	
Men's	2022 Indoor	Lawrence Johnson	60 meters	4th	
Men's	2022 Indoor	Olin Hacker	3000 meters	4th	
Men's	2022 Indoor	Adam Spencer	Distance medley relay	3rd	
Men's	2022 Indoor	Davis Wenthe	Distance medley relay	3rd	
Men's	2022 Indoor	Abdullahi Hassan	Distance medley relay	3rd	
Men's	2022 Indoor	Jackson Sharp	Distance medley relay	3rd	
Men's	2022 Outdoor	Adam Spencer	1500 meters	8th	
Men's	2022 Outdoor	Olin Hacker	5000 meters	1st	
Women's	2022 Outdoor	Destiny Huven	100 meters hurdles	6th	
Women's	2022 Outdoor	Bianca Stubler	400 meters hurdles	6th	
Men's	2023 Indoor	Lawrence Johnson	60 meters	7th	
Men's	2023 Indoor	Jackson Sharp	3000 meters	3rd	
Men's	2023 Indoor	Jackson Sharp	Distance medley relay	3rd	
Men's	2023 Indoor	Jalen Williams	Distance medley relay	3rd	
Men's	2023 Indoor	Abdullahi Hassan	Distance medley relay	3rd	
Men's	2023 Indoor	Bob Liking	Distance medley relay	3rd	
Women's	2023 Indoor	Josie Schaefer	Shot put	5th	
Women's	2023 Indoor	Chloe Lindeman	Weight throw	4th	
Men's	2023 Outdoor	Abdullahi Hassan	800 meters	4th	
Men's	2023 Outdoor	Adam Spencer	1500 meters	3rd	
Men's	2023 Outdoor	Jackson Sharp	5000 meters	3rd	
Women's	2023 Outdoor	Josie Schaefer	Shot put	7th	
Men's	2024 Indoor	Abdullahi Hassan	800 meters	8th	
Men's	2024 Indoor	Adam Spencer	Mile run	2nd	
Men's	2024 Indoor	Jackson Sharp	5000 meters	8th	
Men's	2024 Indoor	Joe dosReis	Distance medley relay	8th	
Men's	2024 Indoor	Jalen Williams	Distance medley relay	8th	
Men's	2024 Indoor	Andrew Casey	Distance medley relay	8th	
Men's	2024 Indoor	Bob Liking	Distance medley relay	8th	
Men's	2024 Indoor	Jason Swarens	Shot put	4th	
Women's	2024 Indoor	Olivia Roberts	Weight throw	7th	
Men's	2024 Outdoor	Adam Spencer	1500 meters	3rd	
Men's	2024 Outdoor	Jason Swarens	Shot put	2nd	
Men's	2025 Indoor	Adam Spencer	3000 meters	3rd	
Men's	2025 Indoor	Andrew Casey	Distance medley relay	8th	
Men's	2025 Indoor	Patrick Hilby	Distance medley relay	8th	
Men's	2025 Indoor	Jalen Williams	Distance medley relay	8th	
Men's	2025 Indoor	Adam Spencer	Distance medley relay	8th	
Men's	2025 Indoor	Jason Swarens	Shot put	3rd	
Men's	2025 Indoor	Joseph White	Shot put	7th	
Women's	2025 Indoor	Taylor Kesner	Weight throw	1st	
Women's	2025 Indoor	Chloe Lindeman	Weight throw	6th	
Men's	2025 Outdoor	Jalen Williams	400 meters	5th	
Men's	2025 Outdoor	Andrew Casey	800 meters	6th	
Men's	2025 Outdoor	Patrick Hilby	800 meters	7th	
Men's	2025 Outdoor	Adam Spencer	1500 meters	1st	
Men's	2025 Outdoor	Adam Spencer	1500 meters	4th	
Men's	2025 Outdoor	Jason Swarens	Shot put	1st	
Women's	2025 Outdoor	Emma Kelley	800 meters	6th	
Women's	2025 Outdoor	Chloe Lindeman	Hammer throw	8th	

== See also ==
- Category:Wisconsin Badgers men's track and field athletes (42)
- Category:Wisconsin Badgers women's track and field athletes (14)
