= 1500 meters at the NCAA Division I Outdoor Track and Field Championships =

This is a list of the NCAA Division I outdoor champions in the 1500 meters or its imperial equivalent mile run. The mile was contested until 1975, while the metric 1500 meters was contested in Olympic years starting in 1932. Metrication occurred in 1976, so all subsequent championships were at the metric distance. Hand timing was used until 1973, while starting in 1974 fully automatic timing was used. The women's race began in 1982.

== Women ==
Key
A=Altitude assisted

Year	Name	Nationality	Team	Time
1982	Leann Warren	United States	University of Oregon	4:17.90
1983	Michele Bush	United States	UCLA	4:14.48
1984	Claudette Groenendaal	United States	University of Oregon	4:14.31
1985	Cathy Branta	United States	University of Wisconsin	4:12.64
1986	Alisa Harvey	United States	University of Tennessee	4:17.48
1987	Suzy Favor	United States	University of Wisconsin	4:09.85
1988	Suzy Favor	United States	University of Wisconsin	4:13.91
1989	Suzy Favor	United States	University of Wisconsin	4:15.83
1990	Suzy Favor	United States	University of Wisconsin	4:08.26
1991	Darcy Arreola	United States	California State Northridge	4:11.46
1992	Sue Gentes	United States	University of Wisconsin	4:16.38
1993	Clare Eichner	United States	University of Wisconsin	4:20.12
1994	Amy Rudolph	United States	Providence	4:17.99
1995	Amy Wickus	United States	University of Wisconsin	4:14.53
1996	Miesha Marzell	United States	Georgetown	4:17.92
1997	Becki Wells	United States	University of Florida	4:12.84
1998	Carmen Douma	Canada	Villanova	4:16.04
1999	Mary Jayne Harrelson	United States	Appalachian State	4:21.06
2000	Susan Taylor	United States	Brigham Young	4:13.03
2001	Mary Jayne Harrelson	United States	Appalachian State	4:14.30
2002	Lena Nilsson	Sweden	UCLA	4:12.60
2003	Tiffany McWilliams	United States	Mississippi State	4:06.75
2004	Tiffany McWilliams	United States	Mississippi State	4:11.59
2005	Anne Shadle	United States	University of Nebraska	4:11.37
2006	Amy Lia	United States	University of Washington	4:14.63
2007	Brie Felnagle	United States	University of North Carolina	4:09.93
2008	Hannah England	United Kingdom	Florida State	4:06.19
2009	Susan Kuijken	United States	Florida State	4:13.05
2010	Charlotte Browning	United Kingdom	University of Florida	4:15.84
2011	Sheila Reid	Canada	Villanova	4:14.57
2012	Katie Flood	United States	University of Washington	4:13.79
2013	Natalja Piliusina	Lithuania	Oklahoma State	4:13.25
2014	Shelby Houlihan	United States	Arizona State	4:18.10
2015	Rhianwedd Price	United States	Mississippi State	4:09.56
2016	Marta Freitas	Portugal	Mississippi State	4:09.53
2017	Jamie Phelan	United States	University of Michigan	4:13.78
2018	Jessica Hull	Australia	University of Oregon	4:08.75
2019	Sinclaire Johnson	United States	Oklahoma State	4:05.98
2021	Anna Camp	United States	BYU Cougars	4:08.53
2022	Sintayehu Vissa	Italy	Ole Miss Rebels	4:09.42
2023	Maia Ramsden	New Zealand	Harvard Crimson	4:08.60
2024	Maia Ramsden	New Zealand	Harvard Crimson	4:06.62
2025	Sophie O'Sullivan	Ireland	University of Washington	4:07.94
2026	Rosemary Longisa	Kenya	Washington State Cougars	4:12.10

== Men ==
Key
y=yards
A=Altitude affected

Year	Name, (Country)	Team	Time
1921	Ray Watson	Kansas St	4:23.4y
1922	Lawrence Shields	Penn St	4:20.4y
1923	Schuyler Enck	Penn St	4:27.4y
1924	Not held		
1925	Jim Reese	Texas	4:18.8y
1926	Charles Judge	Notre Dame	4:22.5y
1927	Ray Conger	Iowa St	4:17.6y
1928	Rufus Kiser	Washington	4:17.6y
1929	Wilbur Getz	Alfred	4:19.4y
1930	Joseph Sivak	Butler	4:19.3y
1931	Ray Putnam	Iowa St	4:18.0y
1932	Glenn Cunningham	Kansas	3:53.0
1933	Glenn Cunningham	Kansas	4:09.8y
1934	Bill Bonthron	Princeton	4:08.9y
1935	Archie San Romani	Emporia St	4:19.1y
1936	Archie San Romani	Emporia St	3:53.0
1937	Charles Fenske	Wisconsin	4:13.9y
1938	Louis Zamperini	Southern Cal	4:08.3y
1939	Louis Zamperini	Southern Cal	4:13.6y
1940	John Munski	Missouri	4:14.7y
1941	Leslie MacMitchell	New York	4:10.4y
1942	Bob Ginn	Nebraska	4:11.1y
1943	Don Burnham	Dartmouth	4:19.1y
1944	Robert Hume	Michigan	4:16.6y
1944	Ross Hume	Michigan	4:16.6y
1945	Ross Hume	Michigan	4:18.5y
1946	Robert Rehberg	Illinois	4:15.2y
1947	Gerry Karver	Penn St	4:17.2yA
1948	Don Gehrmann	Wisconsin	3:54.3
1949	Don Gehrmann	Wisconsin	4:09.6y
1950	Don Gehrmann	Wisconsin	4:12.4y
1951	Warren Druetzler	Michigan St	4:08.8y
1952	Bob McMillen	Occidental	3:50.7y
1953	Wes Santee	Kansas	4:03.7y
1954	Bill Dellinger	Oregon	4:13.8y
1955	Jim Bailey	Oregon	4:05.6y
1956	Ron Delany Ireland	Villanova	3:47.3
1957	Ron Delany Ireland	Villanova	4:06.5y
1958	Ron Delany Ireland	Villanova	4:03.5y
1959	Jim Grelle	Oregon	4:03.9y
1960	Dyrol Burleson	Oregon	3:44.2
1961	Dyrol Burleson	Oregon	4:00.5y
1962	Dyrol Burleson	Oregon	3:59.8y
1963	Morgan Groth	Oregon St	4:05.3Ay
1964	Morgan Groth	Oregon St	3:40.4
1965	Bob Day	UCLA	4:01.8y
1966	Dave Patrick	Villanova	4:02.1y
1967	Jim Ryun	Kansas	4:03.5Ay
1968	Dave Patrick	Villanova	3:39.9
1969	Marty Liquori	Villanova	3:57.7y
1970	Marty Liquori	Villanova	3:59.9y
1971	Marty Liquori	Villanova	3:57.6y
1972	Dave Wottle	Bowling Green	3:39.7
1973	Dave Wottle	Bowling Green	3:57.1y
1974	Paul Cummings	Brigham Y	4:01.1y
1975	Eamonn Coghlan Ireland	Villanova	4:00.06Ay
1976	Eamonn Coghlan Ireland	Villanova	3:37.0
1977	Wilson Waigwa Kenya	UTEP	3:39.9
1978	Steve Scott	UC Irvine	3:37.6
1979	Don Paige	Villanova	3:39.2
1980	Sydney Maree South Africa	Villanova	3:38.6
1981	Sydney Maree South Africa	Villanova	3:35.30
1982	Jim Spivey	Indiana	3:45.42A
1983	Frank O'Mara Ireland	Arkansas	3:40.5
1984	Joaquim Cruz Brazil	Oregon	3:36.5
1985	Abdi Bile Somalia	George Mason	3:41.6
1986	Doug Myers	Oregon	3:41.7
1987	Abdi Bile Somalia	George Mason	3:35.79
1988	Joe Falcon	Arkansas	3:38.9
1989	Kip Cheruiyot Kenya	Mt. St. Mary's	3:42.06A
1990	Bob Kennedy	Indiana	3:40.4
1991	Samuel Kibiri Kenya	Wash St	3:39.5
1992	Steve Holman	Georgetown	3:38.4
1993	Marko Koers Netherlands	Illinois	3:38.1
1994	Graham Hood Canada	Arkansas	3:42.1
1995	Kevin Sullivan Canada	Michigan	3:37.6
1996	Marko Koers Netherlands	Illinois	3:37.6
1997	Seneca Lassiter	Arkansas	3:40.2
1998	Seneca Lassiter	Arkansas	3:42.3
1999	Clyde Colenso South Africa	Southern Meth	3:47.5
2000	Gabe Jennings	Stanford	3:37.76
2001	Bryan Berryhill	Colorado St	3:37.0
2002	Donald Sage	Stanford	3:42.7
2003	Grant Robison	Stanford	3:40.4
2004	Chris Mulvaney United Kingdom	Arkansas	3:44.7
2005	Leonel Manzano	Texas	3:37.1
2006	Vincent Rono Kenya	South Alabama	3:44.1
2007	Lopez Lomong	Northern Arizona	3:37.07
2008	Leonel Manzano	Texas	3:41.25
2009	German Fernandez	Oklahoma State	3:39.00
2010	Andrew Wheating	Oregon	3:47.94
2011	Matthew Centrowitz	Oregon	3:42.54
2012	Andrew Bayer	Indiana	3:43.82
2013	Mac Fleet	Oregon	3:50.25
2014	Mac Fleet	Oregon	3:39.09
2015	Chad Noelle	Oklahoma State	3:54.96
2016	Clayton Murphy	Akron	3:36.38
2017	Josh Kerr	New Mexico	3:43.03
2018	Oliver Hoare	Wisconsin	3:44.77
2019	Yared Nuguse	Notre Dame	3:41.39
2020	Not held	-	-
2021	Cole Hocker	Oregon	3:35.35
2022	Joe Waskom	Washington	3:45.58
2023	Nathan Green	Washington	3:39.50
2024	Joe Waskom	Washington	3:39.48
2025	Nathan Green	Washington	3:47.26
2026	Simeon Birnbaum	Oregon Ducks	3:36.05
