= 4 × 800 meter relay at the NCAA Division I Indoor Track and Field Championships =

The 4 × 800 meter relay or its imperial 4 × 880 yard relay equivalent was held at the NCAA Division I Indoor Track and Field Championships from its founding in 1965 to 1993. The imperial distance was held until 1983, while the metric distance was run from 1984 to 1993. Hand timing was used until 1975 and in 1980, while in all other years fully automatic timing was used. The men's event was not contested in 1984 and 1985. In 1986 and 1987, the 1/10-mile track that the races were run on was 25 inches (640 mm) per lap short, making the actual race distance less than 800 meters those years.

== Winners ==
Key
y=yards
A=Altitude assisted

Women's 4 × 880 yd relay / 4 × 800 m relay winners
Year	Athletes	Split	Team	Time	R.
1983 (Note: Winning time listed as 8:53.5 in USTFCCCA archive)	Ellen Olson	2:19.5 y	Wisconsin Badgers	8:53.68 y	
1983	Mary Anne Brunner	2:12.9 y	Wisconsin Badgers	8:53.68 y	
1983	Sue Spaltholz	2:12.5 y	Wisconsin Badgers	8:53.68 y	
1983	Rose Thompson	2:08.7 y	Wisconsin Badgers	8:53.68 y	
1984	Karol Davidson	2:08.9	Tennessee Volunteers	8:40.17	
1984	Alison Quelch	2:14.3	Tennessee Volunteers	8:40.17	
1984	Alisa Harvey	2:09.0	Tennessee Volunteers	8:40.17	
1984	Joetta Clark	2:08.0	Tennessee Volunteers	8:40.17	
1985	Kelly Toole	2:12.3	Villanova Wildcats	8:33.60	
1985	Debbie Grant	2:06.9	Villanova Wildcats	8:33.60	
1985	Joanne Kehs	2:08.8	Villanova Wildcats	8:33.60	
1985	Veronica McIntosh	2:05.6	Villanova Wildcats	8:33.60	
1986	Sandra Braasch		Florida Gators	8:31.74	
1986	Chris Crowder		Florida Gators	8:31.74	
1986	Sonja Braasch		Florida Gators	8:31.74	
1986	Susan Nash	2:06	Florida Gators	8:31.74	
1987 (Note: Listed as Kathy Franey, Colleen Gallagher, DiMuro, and Procaccio by the USTFCCCA archive. First three splits listed as 2:06.1, 2:05.3, 2:07.8 by The Philadelphia Inquirer.)	Gina Procaccio	2:07.8	Villanova Wildcats	8:24.72	
1987	Debbie Grant	2:03.8	Villanova Wildcats	8:24.72	
1987	Michelle DiMuro	2:07.5	Villanova Wildcats	8:24.72	
1987	Celeste Halliday	2:05.7	Villanova Wildcats	8:24.72	
1988 (Note: Listed as Kathy Franey, Colleen Gallagher, DiMuro, and Gina Procaccio in the USTFCCCA archive)	Michelle Bennett	2:10.1	Villanova Wildcats	8:34.05	
1988	Michelle DiMuro	2:06.7	Villanova Wildcats	8:34.05	
1988	Meg Moisen	2:10.3	Villanova Wildcats	8:34.05	
1988	Celeste Halliday	2:06.9	Villanova Wildcats	8:34.05	
1989	Meg Moisen	2:11.6	Villanova Wildcats	8:34.54	
1989	Michelle Bennett	2:09.4	Villanova Wildcats	8:34.54	
1989	Kim Certain	2:05.4	Villanova Wildcats	8:34.54	
1989	Michelle DiMuro	2:08.1	Villanova Wildcats	8:34.54	
1990	Michelle Torelli	2:07.7	Villanova Wildcats	8:31.95	
1990	Abby Hunte	2:08.8	Villanova Wildcats	8:31.95	
1990	Kim Certain	2:06.3	Villanova Wildcats	8:31.95	
1990	Michelle Bennett	2:09.2	Villanova Wildcats	8:31.95	
1991 (Note: Listed incorrectly as Abby Hunte, Kim Certain, Michelle Torelli, and Michelle Bennett by the USTFCCCA archive. Jones' split was reported as 2:03.4 by The Philadelphia Inquirer.)	Monica Olkowski	2:12.2	Tennessee Volunteers	8:36.32	
1991	Patty Wiegand	2:09.4	Tennessee Volunteers	8:36.32	
1991	Alicia Johnson	2:11.4	Tennessee Volunteers	8:36.32	
1991	Jasmin Jones	2:03.3	Tennessee Volunteers	8:36.32	
1992 (Note: Listed as Renk, Julie Cote, Gentes, Wickus in the USTFCCCA archive)	Sarah Renk	2:10.0	Wisconsin Badgers	8:28.41	
1992	Kim Sherman	2:08.4	Wisconsin Badgers	8:28.41	
1992	Sue Gentes	2:05.2	Wisconsin Badgers	8:28.41	
1992	Amy Wickus	2:04.8	Wisconsin Badgers	8:28.41	
1993 (Note: Listed as Renk, Cote, Sherman, Wickus in the USTFCCCA archive)	Julie Cote	2:10.3	Wisconsin Badgers	8:26.77	
1993	Sarah Renk	2:06.7	Wisconsin Badgers	8:26.77	
1993	Kim Sherman	2:07.9	Wisconsin Badgers	8:26.77	
1993	Amy Wickus	2:01.8	Wisconsin Badgers	8:26.77	

Men's 4 × 880 yd relay / 4 × 800 m relay winners
Year	Athletes	Split	Team	Time	R.
1965	Jim Metcalf	1:55.5 y	Oklahoma State Cowboys	7:27.9 y	
1965	John Perry	1:50.0 y	Oklahoma State Cowboys	7:27.9 y	
1965	Tom Von Ruden	1:50.0 y	Oklahoma State Cowboys	7:27.9 y	
1965	Dave Perry	1:52.4 y	Oklahoma State Cowboys	7:27.9 y	
1966 (Note: The USTFCCCA archive recorded the winning time as 7:30.9)	Arnold Droke	1:56.1 y	Oklahoma State Cowboys	7:30.1 y	
1966	John Perry	1:51.1 y	Oklahoma State Cowboys	7:30.1 y	
1966	Jim Metcalf	1:52.6 y	Oklahoma State Cowboys	7:30.1 y	
1966	Tom Von Ruden	1:50.4 y	Oklahoma State Cowboys	7:30.1 y	
1967	Richard Joyce	1:53.0 y	USC Trojans	7:30.1 y	
1967	Dave Buck	1:52.6 y	USC Trojans	7:30.1 y	
1967	Dennis Carr	1:52.7 y	USC Trojans	7:30.1 y	
1967	Carl Trentadue	1:51.8 y	USC Trojans	7:30.1 y	
1968	Trey Burns	1:52.5 y	Harvard Crimson	7:26.8 y	
1968	Royce Shaw	1:50.6 y	Harvard Crimson	7:26.8 y	
1968	Jim Baker	1:50.9 y	Harvard Crimson	7:26.8 y	
1968	Dave McKelvey	1:52.8 y	Harvard Crimson	7:26.8 y	
1969	Dave Peterson	1:54.4 y	Kansas State Wildcats	7:32.2 y	
1969	Jerome Howe	1:52.3 y	Kansas State Wildcats	7:32.2 y	
1969	Bob Barratti	1:54.3 y	Kansas State Wildcats	7:32.2 y	
1969	Ken Swenson	1:51.2 y	Kansas State Wildcats	7:32.2 y	
1970	Dennis Stewart	1:53.6 y	Kansas Jayhawks	7:25.7 y	
1970	Jim Neihouse	1:50.0 y	Kansas Jayhawks	7:25.7 y	
1970	Roger Kathol	1:52.4 y	Kansas Jayhawks	7:25.7 y	
1970	Brian McElroy	1:49.7 y	Kansas Jayhawks	7:25.7 y	
1971	Rod Hill		UTEP Miners	7:37.4 y	
1971	Peter Romero		UTEP Miners	7:37.4 y	
1971	Fernando De La Cerda		UTEP Miners	7:37.4 y	
1971	Kerry Ellison		UTEP Miners	7:37.4 y	
1972	Dave Kaemerer	1:54.1 y	Illinois Fighting Illini	7:29.9 y	
1972	Ron Phillips	1:51.7 y	Illinois Fighting Illini	7:29.9 y	
1972	Lee LaBadie	1:50.2 y	Illinois Fighting Illini	7:29.9 y	
1972	Rob Mango	1:53.9 y	Illinois Fighting Illini	7:29.9 y	
1973 (Note: Winning time listed as 7:31.6 by Track & Field News)	Paul Nowicki	1:55.5 y	Fordham Rams	7:31.5 y	
1973	Alex Trammel	1:54.0 y	Fordham Rams	7:31.5 y	
1973	John Jurgens	1:51.4 y	Fordham Rams	7:31.5 y	
1973	Marcel Philippe	1:50.6 y	Fordham Rams	7:31.5 y	
1974	Don Brown	1:53.7 y	South Carolina Gamecocks	7:27.4 y	
1974	Mike Sheley	1:51.2 y	South Carolina Gamecocks	7:27.4 y	
1974	John Brown	1:51.5 y	South Carolina Gamecocks	7:27.4 y	
1974	Jim Schaper	1:51.0 y	South Carolina Gamecocks	7:27.4 y	
1975	Charles Norelli	1:54.3 y	Princeton Tigers	7:34.9 y	
1975	Richard Aneser	1:55.1 y	Princeton Tigers	7:34.9 y	
1975	Charles Hedrick	1:53.1 y	Princeton Tigers	7:34.9 y	
1975	Craig Masback	1:52.4 y	Princeton Tigers	7:34.9 y	
1976	Mark Randall	1:53.9 y	Wisconsin Badgers	7:26.79 y	
1976	Steve Lacy	1:52.3 y	Wisconsin Badgers	7:26.79 y	
1976	Mark Sang	1:50.9 y	Wisconsin Badgers	7:26.79 y	
1976	Dick Moss	1:49.7 y	Wisconsin Badgers	7:26.79 y	
1977	Jeff Ramsey	1:53.2 y	Oklahoma Sooners	7:30.96 y	
1977	Brad Swartout	1:55.4 y	Oklahoma Sooners	7:30.96 y	
1977	Dyrk Dahl	1:51.3 y	Oklahoma Sooners	7:30.96 y	
1977	Randy Wilson	1:50.5 y	Oklahoma Sooners	7:30.96 y	
1978	Jay Quade	1:53.1 y	New Mexico Lobos	7:27.53 y	
1978	Mark Romero	1:53.2 y	New Mexico Lobos	7:27.53 y	
1978	Jeremiah Ongwae	1:50.1 y	New Mexico Lobos	7:27.53 y	
1978	Sammy Kipkurgat	1:51.4 y	New Mexico Lobos	7:27.53 y	
1979	Paul Downes	1:55.8 y	Nebraska Cornhuskers	7:31.3 y	
1979	Brian Dunnigan	1:53.6 y	Nebraska Cornhuskers	7:31.3 y	
1979	Mark Fluitt	1:51.2 y	Nebraska Cornhuskers	7:31.3 y	
1979	Scott Poehling	1:50.9 y	Nebraska Cornhuskers	7:31.3 y	
1980	Mahlon Erickson	1:56.4 y	Oklahoma Sooners	7:32.68 y	
1980	Jody Jimerson	1:53.4 y	Oklahoma Sooners	7:32.68 y	
1980	Dyrk Dahl	1:51.6 y	Oklahoma Sooners	7:32.68 y	
1980	John Rohde	1:50.9 y	Oklahoma Sooners	7:32.68 y	
1981 (Note: Leadoff listed as "Brian Gtimes" in the USTFCCCA archive)	Brian Grimes	1:55.7 y	Rutgers Scarlet Knights	7:30.95 y	
1981	Stan Belin	1:54.0 y	Rutgers Scarlet Knights	7:30.95 y	
1981	Walter Kirkland	1:51.2 y	Rutgers Scarlet Knights	7:30.95 y	
1981	James Westman	1:50.0 y	Rutgers Scarlet Knights	7:30.95 y	
1982	Edwin Koech	1:54.0 y	Richmond Spiders	7:24.48 y	
1982	Sosthenes Bitok	1:51.6 y	Richmond Spiders	7:24.48 y	
1982	Phil Norgate	1:49.6 y	Richmond Spiders	7:24.48 y	
1982	Julian Spooner	1:49.3 y	Richmond Spiders	7:24.48 y	
1983	John Borgese	1:52.8 y	Villanova Wildcats	7:21.90 y	
1983	John Keyworth	1:51.2 y	Villanova Wildcats	7:21.90 y	
1983	Mike England	1:48.9 y	Villanova Wildcats	7:21.90 y	
1983	Marcus O'Sullivan	1:48.9 y	Villanova Wildcats	7:21.90 y	
1986	Keith Iovine		Arkansas Razorbacks	7:20.72	
1986	Matt Taylor		Arkansas Razorbacks	7:20.72	
1986	Paul Donovan		Arkansas Razorbacks	7:20.72	
1986	Wayne Moncrieffe		Arkansas Razorbacks	7:20.72	
1987	William Looney	1:49.9	Arkansas Razorbacks	7:18.67	
1987	Matt Taylor	1:49.9	Arkansas Razorbacks	7:18.67	
1987	Lorenzo Brown	1:49.3	Arkansas Razorbacks	7:18.67	
1987	Wayne Moncrieffe	1:49.6	Arkansas Razorbacks	7:18.67	
1988	Aidan O'Regan	1:52.2	Villanova Wildcats	7:25.23	
1988	Howard Jackson	1:51.7	Villanova Wildcats	7:25.23	
1988	Mark Sullivan	1:51.1	Villanova Wildcats	7:25.23	
1988	Bruce Harris	1:53.0	Villanova Wildcats	7:25.23	
1989	Mike Radziwinski	1:51.0	Clemson Tigers	7:17.45	
1989	Dave Wittman	1:49.7	Clemson Tigers	7:17.45	
1989	Phil Greyling	1:48.5	Clemson Tigers	7:17.45	
1989	Terrance Herrington	1:47.7	Clemson Tigers	7:17.45	
1990 (Note: Seeger's split reported as 1:46.9 by The Philadelphia Inquirer)	Howard Jackson	1:53.7	Villanova Wildcats	7:19.94	
1990	Aidan O'Regan	1:49.8	Villanova Wildcats	7:19.94	
1990	Brad Sumner	1:49.4	Villanova Wildcats	7:19.94	
1990	Michael Seeger	1:47.0	Villanova Wildcats	7:19.94	
1991	Steve Holman	1:51.5	Georgetown Hoyas	7:19.86	
1991	Michael Jasper	1:50.3	Georgetown Hoyas	7:19.86	
1991	Rich Kenah	1:50.4	Georgetown Hoyas	7:19.86	
1991	Ethan Frey	1:47.7	Georgetown Hoyas	7:19.86	
1992	Dedric Jones	1:49.1	Florida Gators	7:18.23	
1992	Lewis Lacy	1:49.7	Florida Gators	7:18.23	
1992	Stephen Adderley	1:50.0	Florida Gators	7:18.23	
1992	Scott Peters	1:49.4	Florida Gators	7:18.23	
1993	Carl Lowe	1:52.8	Eastern Michigan Eagles	7:19.13	
1993	Paul McMullen	1:47.7	Eastern Michigan Eagles	7:19.13	
1993	Greg Rhymer	1:50.8	Eastern Michigan Eagles	7:19.13	
1993	Tommy Asinga	1:47.8	Eastern Michigan Eagles	7:19.13	
