= 800 meters at the NCAA Division I Indoor Track and Field Championships =

This is a list of the NCAA Division I indoor champions in the 800 meters or its imperial equivalent 880 yards. The imperial distance was run until 1983, while the metric distance was contested since 1984. The event was not held in 1986 and 1987. Hand timing was used until 1975, while starting in 1976 fully automatic timing was used. In 1986 and 1987, the 1/10-mile track that the races were run on was 25 inches (640 mm) per lap short, making the actual race distance less than 800 meters those years.

== Winners ==
=== Women ===
Women's 800m / 880yd winners
Year	Athlete	Team	Time
1983	Joetta Clark	Tennessee Volunteers	2:06.02 y
1984	Veronica McIntosh	Villanova Wildcats	2:06.82
1985	Tina Parrott	Indiana Hoosiers	2:08.69
1988	Karol Davidson	Texas Longhorns	2:08.19
1989	Edith Nakiyingi	Iowa State Cyclones	2:05.68
1990	Meredith Rainey	Harvard Crimson	2:02.77
1991	Edith Nakiyingi	Iowa State Cyclones	2:04.84
1992	Mireille Sankatsing	Eastern Michigan Eagles	2:03.47
1993	Amy Wickus	Wisconsin Badgers	2:04.80
1994	Amy Wickus	Wisconsin Badgers	2:02.05
1995	Amy Wickus	Wisconsin Badgers	2:04.86
1996	Kristi Kloster	Kansas Jayhawks	2:04.91
1997	Dawn Williams-Sewer	Little Rock Trojans	2:02.55
1998	Hazel Clark	Florida Gators	2:02.53
1999	Hazel Clark	Florida Gators	2:01.77
2000	Chantee Earl	Pittsburgh Panthers	2:02.19
2001	Svetlana Badrankova	UTEP Miners	2:06.58
2002	Marian Burnett	LSU Lady Tigers	2:05.33
2003	Lena Nilsson	UCLA Bruins	2:05.13
2004	Nicole Cook	Tennessee Volunteers	2:03.27
2005	Aneita Denton	Arkansas Razorbacks	2:03.65
2006	Heather Dorniden	Minnesota Golden Gophers	2:05.64
2007	Alysia Johnson	California Golden Bears	2:03.47
2008	LaTavia Thomas	LSU Lady Tigers	2:05.07
2009	Lacey Cramer	BYU Cougars	2:04.27
2010	Phoebe Wright	Tennessee Volunteers	2:02.55
2011	Lacey Bleazard	BYU Cougars	2:04.09
2012	Nachelle Mackie	BYU Cougars	2:03.30
2013	Natoya Goule	LSU Lady Tigers	2:02.00
2014	Laura Roesler	Oregon Ducks	2:03.85 A
2015	Natoya Goule	Clemson Tigers	2:01.64
2016	Raevyn Rogers	Oregon Ducks	2:04.68
2017	Raevyn Rogers	Oregon Ducks	2:01.09
2018	Sabrina Southerland	Oregon Ducks	2:01.55
2019	Danae Rivers	Penn State Nittany Lions	2:03.69
2021	Aaliyah Miller	Baylor Bears	2:00.69
2022	Lindsey Butler	Virginia Tech Hokies	2:01.37
2023	Roisin Willis	Stanford Cardinal	1:59.93 A
2024	Juliette Whittaker	Stanford Cardinal	1:59.53
2025	Makayla Paige	North Carolina Tar Heels	2:00.39
2026	Gladys Chepngetich	Clemson Tigers	2:00.01

=== Men ===
Key
y=yards
A=Altitude assisted

==== 880 Yards ====
Year	Name, (Country)	Team	Time
1965	Tom Von Ruden	Oklahoma State Cowboys	1:51.8y
1966	Richardo Urbina	Georgetown Hoyas	1:51.9y
1967	Dave Patrick	Villanova Wildcats	1:48.9y
1968	Dave Patrick	Villanova Wildcats	1:52.0y
1969	Frank Murphy Ireland	Villanova Wildcats	1:51.1y
1970	Mark Winzenried	Wisconsin Badgers	1:51.7y
1971	Mark Winzenried	Wisconsin Badgers	1:50.9y
1972	Dave Wottle	Bowling Green Falcons	1:51.8y
1973	Ken Schappert	Villanova Wildcats	1:50.4y
1974	Reggie Clark	William & Mary Tribe	1:52.2y
1975	Mark Enyeart	Utah State Aggies	1:52.4y
1976	Bob Prince	Kansas State Wildcats	1:53.03y
1977	Mark Belger	Villanova Wildcats	1:49.17y
1978	Mark Belger	Villanova Wildcats	1:49.13y
1979	Evans White	Prairie View A&M Panthers	1:51.90y
1980	Evans White	Prairie View A&M Panthers	1:52.32y
1981	Sammy Koskei Kenya	SMU Mustangs	1:52.29y
1982	Dave Patrick	Tennessee Volunteers	1:49.94y

==== 800 Meters ====
Men's 800m winners
Year	Name, (Country)	Team	Time
1983	John Marshall	Villanova	1:51.23y
1984	Daniel Rojas (Note: Originally won by Iowa State's Gareth Brown in a time of 1:49.47, but he was later disqualified.)	Air Force	1:49.52
1985	Earl Jones	Eastern Mich	1:47.26
1986	not held		
1987	not held		
1988	Jim Maton	Eastern Ill	1:49.27
1989	Paul Ereng Kenya	Virginia	1:47.69
1990	Mark Everett	Florida	1:47.45
1991	George Kersh	Mississippi	1:46.19
1992	Rich Kenah	Georgetown	1:47.40
1993	Marko Koers Netherlands	Illinois	1:48.39
1994	Jose "Tony" Parrilla	Tennessee	1:47.77
1995	Michael Williams (JAM)	Manhattan	1:48.12
1996	Einârs Tupurîtis Latvia	Wichita St	1:45.80
1997	David Krummenacker	Georgia Tech	1:47.49
1998	David Krummenacker	Georgia Tech	1:47.52
1999	Derrick Peterson	Missouri	1:45.88
2000	Jess Strutzel	UCLA	1:46.57
2001	Jean-Patrick Nduwimana Burundi	Arizona	1:45.33
2002	Otukile Lekote Botswana	South Carolina	1:46.88
2003	Nate Brannen Canada	Michigan	1:47.79
2004	Nate Brannen Canada	Michigan	1:47.61
2005	Kevin Hicks	Florida A&M	1:46.97
2006	Jackson Langat Kenya	Texas Christian	1:47.02
2007	Ryan Brown	Washington	1:48.40
2008	Tyler Mulder	UNI	1:49.20
2009	Jacob Hernandez	Texas	1:48.04
2010	Robby Andrews	Virginia	1:48.39
2011	Fred Samoei	Alabama	1:48.33
2012	Mason McHenry	Arizona State	1:47.96
2013	Elijah Greer	Oregon	1:47.13
2014	Brandon McBride Canada	Mississippi State	1:48.17
2015	Edward Kemboi	Iowa State	1:46.05
2016	Clayton Murphy	Akron	1:46.68
2017	Emmanuel Korir	UTEP	1:47.48
2018	Michael Saruni	UTEP	1:45.15
2019	Bryce Hoppel	Kansas	1:46.46
2021	Charlie Hunter	Oregon	1:45.90
2022	Brandon Miller	Texas A&M Aggies	1:47.19
2023	Yusuf Bizimana	Texas Longhorns	1:46.02
2024	Rivaldo Marshall	Iowa Hawkeyes	1:46.96
2025	(Canada) Matthew Erickson	Oregon Ducks	1:46.43
2026	(Jamaica) Tyrice Taylor	Arkansas Razorbacks	1:46.00
