= Jackson Sharp =

Australian middle-distance runner (born 2000)

Personal information
- Born: 21 August 2000 (age 25)

Sport
- Sport: Athletics
- Events: Middle-distance running, Cross Country running

Jackson Sharp (born 21 August 2000) is an Australian middle-distance and cross country runner.

== Biography ==
From Wentworth Falls, New South Wales, Sharp competed for Australia at the 2017 Commonwealth Youth Games in Nassau, The Bahamas, placing fourth over 1500 metres.

Competing for the University of Wisconsin in February 2022, Sharp placed third in the distance medley relay at the 2022 NCAA Indoor Championships, racing alongside Adam Spencer, Davis Wenthe and Abdullahi Hassan, in Birmingham, Alabama. Sharp won the team event and placed second for the Wisconsin Badgers behind teammate Bob Liking in the individual race at the 2022 Big Ten Cross Country Championships, finishing the 8k course in 23:48.15, behind Liking by 0.06 seconds. In the distance medley relay at the 2023 NCAA Indoor Championships he placed third with the Wisconsin team including Spencer, Hassan and Colin Enz in Albuquerque, New Mexico. He was also third over 5000 metres at the 2023 NCAA Outdoor Championships in June 2023 in Austin, Texas. Sharp placed fifth at the 2023 Nuttycombe Invitational cross country race. Sharp was a finalist at the 2024 Outdoor NCAA Championships over 5000 metres competing for Wisconsin.

After graduating from Wisconsin, where he was a six-time Big Ten Conference champion, he turned professional and joined the HOKA Elite group in Arizona in September 2024.

Competing at the 2026 Maurie Plant Meet in Melbourne in March, he won the 3000 metres in a meet record time of 7:41.02, finishing ahead of compatriot and long-time race leader Seth O'Donnell with a dip on the line. On 11 April, he placed fourth behind Cam Myers and O'Donnell over 5000 metres at the 2026 Australian Championships, running 13:15.92. Sharp ran a personal best for the 5000 m at the LA Track Fest on 23 May 2026, with 13:05.22. He competed in the 5000 metres at the 2026 Commonwealth Games in Glasgow, Scotland.

== Personal bests ==
- Mile – 3:53.20 (Dublin 2025)
- 3000 metres – 7:36.42 (Budapest 2025)
  - 3000 metres indoor – 7:41.65 (Winston-Salem 2026)
- 5000 metres – 13:05.22 (Los Angeles 2026)
  - 5000 metres indoor – 13:25.51 (Boston 2023)
