= 1978 AIAW Indoor Track and Field Championships =

- Dates: March 17–18, 1978
- Host city: Columbia, Missouri
- Venue: Hearnes Multipurpose Building
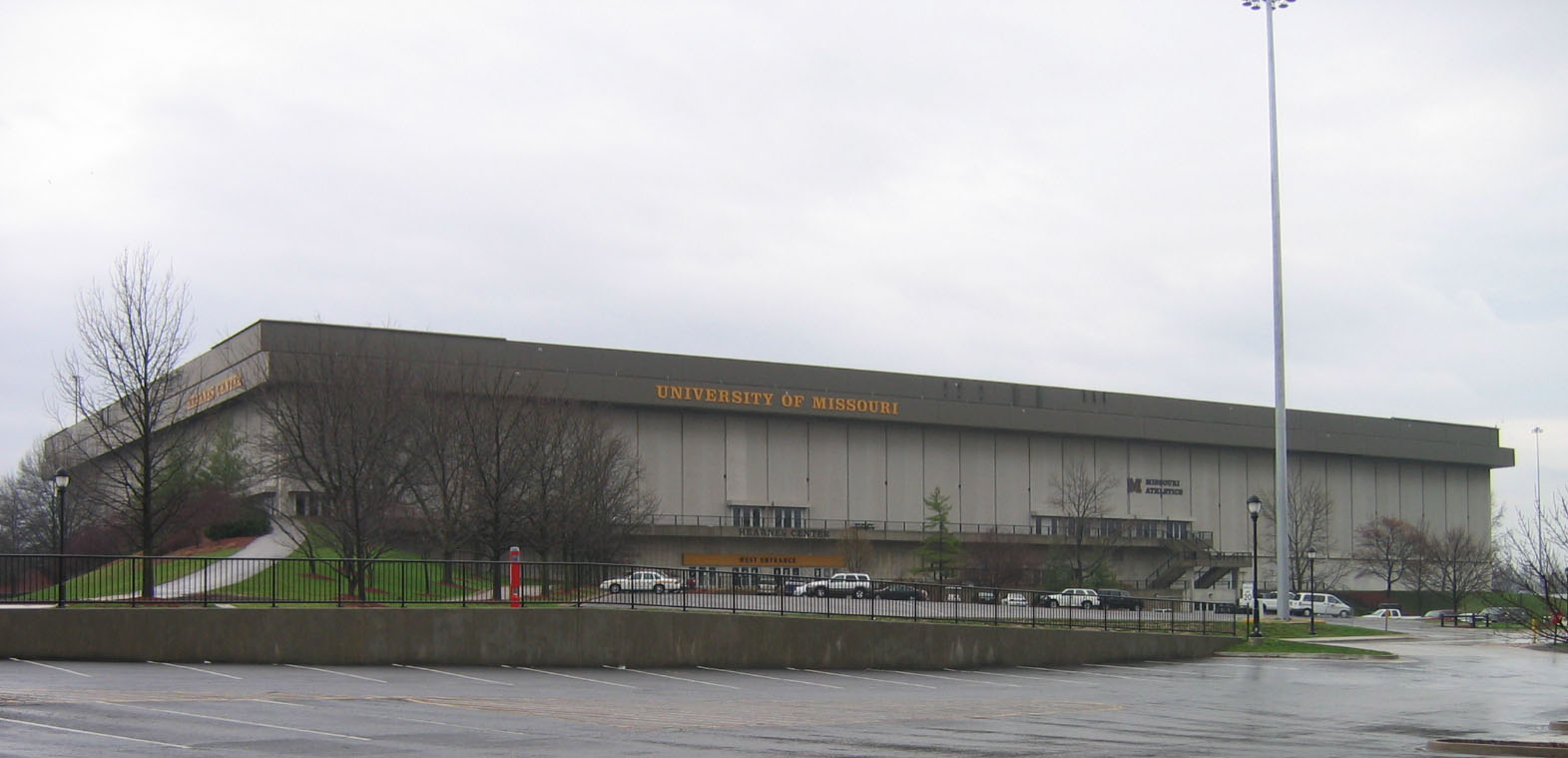

The 1978 Missouri National Invitational Women's Indoor Track and Field Meet was the first unofficial collegiate championship event for women's indoor track and field to be sanctioned by the Association for Intercollegiate Athletics for Women in the United States. It was a forerunner of the first official AIAW Indoor Track and Field Championships. Held for the first two years as an invitational, the meet gained official national championship status in 1980, when a qualification process was employed.

The meet was contested March 17−18, 1978 in Columbia, Missouri at the Hearnes Multipurpose Building and won by the Wisconsin Badgers track and field team. Unlike other AIAW-sponsored sports, there were not separate large and small college division championships for indoor track and field. At the championships, Sheila Calmese broke the American indoor record in the 300 yards, splitting 35.26 seconds.

== Team standings ==
- Scoring: 10 points for a 1st-place finish, 8 points for 2nd, 6 points for 3rd, 4 points for 4th, 2 points for 5th, and 1 point for 6th. Top 10 teams shown.

Rank	Team	Points
1st place, gold medalist(s)	Wisconsin Badgers	59
2nd place, silver medalist(s)	Kansas Jayhawks	47
3rd place, bronze medalist(s)	Rutgers Scarlet Knights	28
4th	Nebraska Cornhuskers	27
5th	Oklahoma Sooners	24
5th	Kansas State Wildcats	24
7th	Colorado Buffaloes	20
7th	Maryland Terrapins	20
9th	Temple Owls	16
9th	Colorado State Rams	16

== Results ==
- Only results of finals are shown

60 yards
Pl.	Name	Team	Mark
1st place, gold medalist(s)	Deb Carter	Truman Bulldogs	6.82
2nd place, silver medalist(s)	Sheila Calmese	Kansas Jayhawks	6.86
3rd place, bronze medalist(s)	Athlen Bowles	Eastern Michigan Eagles	6.90
4th	Hazel Lucas	Rutgers Scarlet Knights	7.09
5th	Karen Wilson	Murray State Racers	7.10
6th	Yvette Hyman	Wisconsin Badgers	7.10

300 yards
Pl.	Name	Team	Mark
1st place, gold medalist(s)	Sheila Calmese	Kansas Jayhawks	35.26 NR
2nd place, silver medalist(s)	Cindy Tatum	Nebraska Cornhuskers	35.59
3rd place, bronze medalist(s)	Yvette Hyman	Wisconsin Badgers	36.33
4th	Linn Crieb	Illinois Fighting Illini	36.59
5th	Jane Dwyer	Wisconsin Badgers	37.2
6th	Tammy Richard	Indiana State Sycamores	37.3

440 yards
Pl.	Name	Team	Mark
1st place, gold medalist(s)	Lorna Forde	LIU Brooklyn Blackbirds	54.48
2nd place, silver medalist(s)	Jackie Daniels	Temple Owls	55.64
3rd place, bronze medalist(s)	Jill Lancaster	Oklahoma Sooners	56.7
4th	Freda Hancock	Kansas State Wildcats	57.06
5th	Charmaine Kuhlman	Kansas Jayhawks	57.24
6th	Julie Seaton	Nebraska Cornhuskers	57.4

600 yards
Pl.	Name	Team	Mark
1st place, gold medalist(s)	Lee Ballenger	Colorado Buffaloes	1:22.12
2nd place, silver medalist(s)	Brenda Howard	Wisconsin Badgers	1:24.29
3rd place, bronze medalist(s)	Karen McDougall	Eastern Michigan Eagles	1:24.78
4th	Sue Tallard	Wisconsin Badgers	1:27.29

880 yards
Pl.	Name	Team	Mark
1st place, gold medalist(s)	Siri Bjelland	Oklahoma Sooners	2:11.88
2nd place, silver medalist(s)	Cindy Worcester	Kansas State Wildcats	2:12.72
3rd place, bronze medalist(s)	Cynthia Wuss	Rutgers Scarlet Knights	2:15.77
4th	Sally Rand	Colorado State Rams	2:15.46
5th	Connie Prince	Kansas State Wildcats	2:16.3
6th	Cynthia Cox	Minnesota Golden Gophers	2:17.2

1000 yards
Pl.	Name	Team	Mark
1st place, gold medalist(s)	Donna Fox	Nebraska Cornhuskers	2:33.58
2nd place, silver medalist(s)	Ellen Brewster	Wisconsin Badgers	2:33.86
3rd place, bronze medalist(s)	Suzie Houston	Wisconsin Badgers	2:34.81
4th	Cathy McMillin	Kansas Jayhawks	2:38.34
5th	Lisa Thomas	Arkansas Razorbacks	2:40.2

Mile run
Pl.	Name	Team	Mark
1st place, gold medalist(s)	Cathie Twomey	Minnesota Golden Gophers	4:52.4
2nd place, silver medalist(s)	Suzie Houston	Wisconsin Badgers	4:53.46
3rd place, bronze medalist(s)	Susan North	Illinois–Springfield Prairie Stars	4:55.5
4th	Lynn Morin	Wisconsin Badgers	4:56.05
5th	Cindy Dixon	Nebraska Cornhuskers	4:56.9
6th	Michelle Brown	Kansas State Wildcats	NT

2 miles
Pl.	Name	Team	Mark
1st place, gold medalist(s)	Dana Slater	Colorado Buffaloes	10:20.0
2nd place, silver medalist(s)	Karen Diane Bridges	Oklahoma State Cowgirls	10:24.92
3rd place, bronze medalist(s)	Mary Kunkel	Missouri Tigers	10:35.22
4th	Lynn Morin	Wisconsin Badgers	10:41.74
5th	Anita Moyer	Illinois Fighting Illini	10:43.6
6th	Cathie Twomey	Minnesota Golden Gophers	10:45.6
7th	Linda Brown	Missouri Tigers	10:49.6
8th	Diane Long	Morehead State Eagles	10:50.7
9th	Kim Dunlap	Maryland Terrapins	10:55.8

60 yards hurdles
Pl.	Name	Team	Mark
1st place, gold medalist(s)	Debra Deutsch	Rutgers Scarlet Knights	7.99
2nd place, silver medalist(s)	Julie Smithers	Rutgers Scarlet Knights	8.04
3rd place, bronze medalist(s)	Lori Lowrey	Kansas Jayhawks	8.10
4th	Carol Thompson	Delaware Fightin' Blue Hens	8.26
5th	Gayle Harris Watkins	Western Kentucky Lady Toppers	8.30
6th	Nancy Kindig	Nebraska Cornhuskers	8.31

4 × 440 yards relay
Pl.	Name	Team	Mark
1st place, gold medalist(s)	Melissa Hill	Maryland Terrapins	3:47.80
1st place, gold medalist(s)	Marshell Davis	Maryland Terrapins	3:47.80
1st place, gold medalist(s)	Debbie Jackson	Maryland Terrapins	3:47.80
1st place, gold medalist(s)	Linda Miller	Maryland Terrapins	3:47.80
2nd place, silver medalist(s)		Temple Owls	3:52.72
3rd place, bronze medalist(s)	Lorraine Davidson	Kansas State Wildcats	3:53.82
3rd place, bronze medalist(s)	Cindy Worcester	Kansas State Wildcats	3:53.82
3rd place, bronze medalist(s)	Jan Smith	Kansas State Wildcats	3:53.82
3rd place, bronze medalist(s)	Wanda Trent	Kansas State Wildcats	3:53.82
4th		Nebraska Cornhuskers	3:54.84
5th	Yvette Hyman	Wisconsin Badgers	3:55.8
5th	Ellen Brewster	Wisconsin Badgers	3:55.8
5th	Brenda Howard	Wisconsin Badgers	3:55.8
5th	Sue Tallard	Wisconsin Badgers	3:55.8
6th		Omaha Mavericks	3:58.6

High jump
Pl.	Name	Team	Mark
1st place, gold medalist(s)	Jalene Chase	Maryland Terrapins	5 ft 10 in (1.77 m)
2nd place, silver medalist(s)	Shawn Corwin	Kansas Jayhawks	5 ft 7 in (1.7 m)
3rd place, bronze medalist(s)	Mary Grinaker	Wisconsin Badgers	5 ft 7 in (1.7 m)
4th	Beverly Washington	Illinois Fighting Illini	5 ft 5 in (1.65 m)
5th	Cindy Farrand	Murray State Racers	5 ft 5 in (1.65 m)
5th	Mary Anne Harrington	Colorado State Rams	5 ft 5 in (1.65 m)
5th	Diane Villeneuve	Morehead State Eagles	5 ft 5 in (1.65 m)
5th	Susan Simpkins	Bates Bobcats	5 ft 5 in (1.65 m)
5th	Janelle Smalley	Texas Tech Red Raiders	5 ft 5 in (1.65 m)

Long jump
Pl.	Name	Team	Mark
1st place, gold medalist(s)	Mary Anne Harrington	Colorado State Rams	19 ft 2 1/4 in (5.84 m)
2nd place, silver medalist(s)	Charmaine Kuhlman	Kansas Jayhawks	18 ft 5 1/4 in (5.61 m)
3rd place, bronze medalist(s)	Patricia Miller	Yale Bulldogs	18 ft 4 1/4 in (5.59 m)
4th	Angie Bradley	Western Kentucky Lady Toppers	17 ft 11 3/4 in (5.48 m)
5th	Brenda Wilson	Colorado State Rams	17 ft 7 1/4 in (5.36 m)
6th	Georgi Morris	Missouri Tigers	17 ft 6 1/2 in (5.34 m)

Shot put
Pl.	Name	Team	Mark
1st place, gold medalist(s)	Jennifer Smit	UTEP Miners	48 ft 8 in (14.83 m)
2nd place, silver medalist(s)	Cecil Hansen	Oklahoma Sooners	47 ft 1 in (14.35 m)
3rd place, bronze medalist(s)	Ann Turbyne	Maine Black Bears	46 ft 4 3/4 in (14.14 m)
4th	Branwen Smith	Illinois–Springfield Prairie Stars	46 ft 1 1/4 in (14.05 m)
5th	Ria Stalman	UTEP Miners	46 ft 0 1/2 in (14.03 m)
6th	Linda Long	Kansas State Wildcats	45 ft 0 3/4 in (13.73 m)

== See also ==
- Association for Intercollegiate Athletics for Women championships § Indoor track and field
- 1978 NCAA Division I Indoor Track and Field Championships
