= L.O. Johnson =

American sprinter (born 1999)

Personal information
- Full name: Lawrence Johnson
- Born: December 6, 1999 (age 26)
- Education: University of Wisconsin

Sport
- Country: United States
- Sport: Athletics
- Event: Sprint
- College team: Wisconsin Badgers

Achievements and titles
- Personal bests: Outdoor; 100 m: 10.01 (Dessau, 2026); 200 m: 20.41 (Fayetteville, 2022); Indoor; 60 m: 6.54 (Chicago, 2023); 200 m: 21.04 (Alburquerque, 2022)
Medal record
Men's athletics
Representing United States
NACAC Championships
Gold medal – first place	2022 Freeport	4 × 100 m relay

Lawrence Johnson (born 6 December 1999) often referred to as L.O. Johnson is an American sprinter.

== Biography ==
Johnson is from Waunakee, Wisconsin. His father, Lawrence Johnson Snr. was a first-team All-American cornerback for the University of Wisconsin in 1978 and was drafted in the second round of the 1979 NFL draft. His mother, Bernetta Johnson, won Big Ten Conference titles in college track and field. He started in athletics at the age of seven years-old. His sister LaBreya also competed in college athletics at UW-Milwaukee.

Johnson signed to the University of New Mexico where he played football and competed in track and field for one season before transferring to the University of Wisconsin. Whilst competing for the Wisconsin Badgers, he set school records in the 60 metres, 100 metres and 200 metres, all three of which his father had also previously held.

He was a gold medalist in the 4 x 100 metres relay at the 2022 NACAC Championships alongside Brandon Carnes, Isiah Young and Kyree King in 38.29 seconds in Freeport, Bahamas. In February 2023, Johnson ran a personal best 6.54 seconds for the 60 metres in Chicago.

In June 2025, he ran a wind-assisted 9.99 seconds for the 100 metres in Texas (+2.4 m/s). He reached the final of the 100 metres at the 2025 USA Outdoor Track and Field Championships, placing ninth with a time of 10.13 seconds (+1.8).

In January 2026, he ran 6.57 seconds for the 60 metres to win the Elite Indoor Miramas Meeting, a World Athletics Indoor Tour silver meeting in Miramas, France. Johnson placed sixth in the final of the 60 metres at the 2026 USA Indoor Track and Field Championships in New York. On 24 July, he was a finalist at the 2026 USA Outdoor Track and Field Championships over 100 metres, placing seventh overall.
