= Simon Bairu =

Canadian long-distance runner

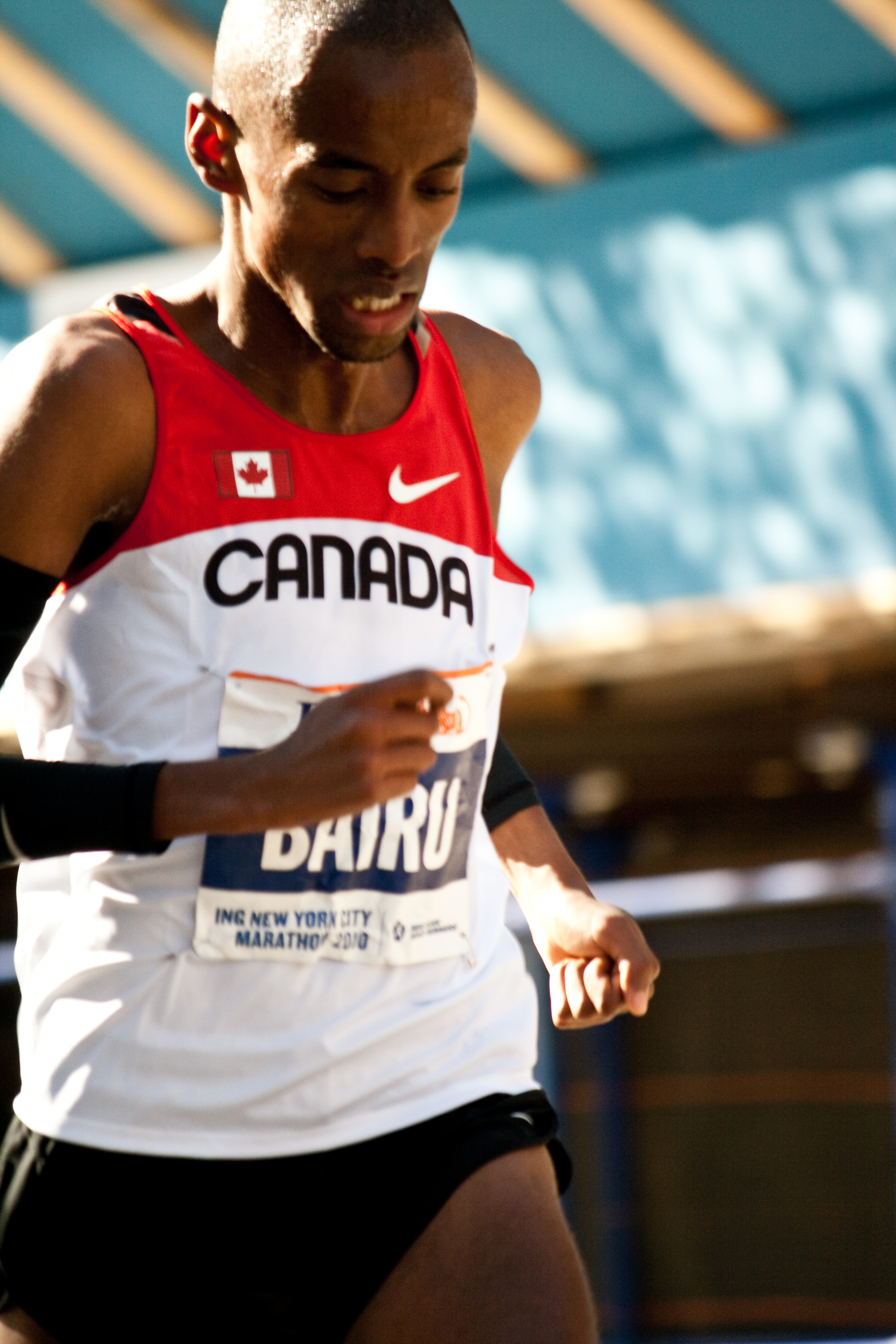

Personal information
- Nationality: Canadian
- Born: 8 August 1983 (age 42) Riyadh, Saudi Arabia

Sport
- Sport: Running
- College team: University of Wisconsin

Simon Bairu (born 8 August 1983) is a Canadian long-distance runner.

== Early life ==
Bairu was born in Riyadh, Saudi Arabia, to an Ethiopian mother and an Eritrean father. He grew up in Regina, Saskatchewan, Canada where his family moved to when he was three years old.

== Career ==
Bairu attended Dr. Martin LeBoldus High School, where he flourished as a provincial and then national level track and field athlete. He then attended the University of Wisconsin where he was guided by coach Jerry Schumacher to win two NCAA cross-country titles.

As a post-collegiate, Bairu moved to Portland, Oregon to train with the Bowerman Track Club, a professional athletics group founded by Schumacher that was originally formed primarily by Wisconsin teammates, such as Chris Solinsky, Matt Tegenkamp, Evan Jager and Tim Nelson.

In 2010, Bairu placed 12th at the 2010 IAAF World Cross Country Championships, as well as set a 10,000 m Canadian national record of 27:23.63 minutes at Stanford (this record was bettered by Cameron Levins in 2013). Over his career, Bairu won a record seven Canadian Cross Country Championship titles. Additionally, he also won the inaugural Miami Beach Half Marathon in December 2011, as well as the San Jose Half Marathon in October 2012.

Bairu officially retired from professional racing in September 2014.

== Personal bests ==
Surface	Event	Time (m:s)	Venue	Date
Track	3000 m	7:49.20	Gent, Belgium	7 July 2007
Track	5000 m	13:25.91	Heusden-Zolder, Belgium	28 July 2007
Track	10,000 m	27:23.63	Palo Alto, USA	1 May 2010
Road	10 km	28:30	Ottawa, Ontario, Canada	26 May 2007
Road	Half marathon	1:02:08	Philadelphia, USA	19 September 2010

- All information taken from IAAF profile.

== See also ==
- Canadian records in track and field
