= Ken Swenson =

American middle-distance runner (born 1948)

Personal information
- Born: April 18, 1948 (age 78) Clay Center, Kansas, U.S.
Medal record
Men's Athletics
Representing the United States
Pan American Games
Gold medal – first place	1971 Cali	800 metres

Kenneth Lloyd Swenson (born April 18, 1948) is an American middle-distance runner. Swenson was the world leader at 800 meters in 1970 and competed in the 1972 Summer Olympics in Munich.

== Career ==
As a senior at Kansas State University, Swenson won the 880 yards in 1:46.3 at the 1970 NCAA outdoor championships. He also won at that year's national (AAU) championships, narrowly defeating Mark Winzenried as both were timed in 1:47.4. Swenson set his personal best for 800 meters, 1:44.8, on July 16, 1970 in Stuttgart in a dual meet between the United States and West Germany; the time was the fastest in the world that year and a new American record for the metric distance. (Note: The previous record was Jim Ryun's 1:44.9 from 1966. Ryun's time had been set at 880 yards (804.672 m), and was worth about 1:44.3 for 800 m.) Track & Field News ranked Swenson the world's second-best half-miler that year, behind Yevgeniy Arzhanov of the Soviet Union.

In 1971, Swenson only placed third in the AAU outdoor meet (behind Juris Luzins and Jamaica's Byron Dyce); however, he won gold at the Pan American Games in Cali, running 1:48.08. At the 1972 Olympic Trials Swenson ran 1:45.1, his best time since 1970; he lost to Dave Wottle (who equaled the world record of 1:44.3) and Rick Wohlhuter, but took the third and final Olympic qualifying spot ahead of early leader Jim Ryun. At the Olympics in Munich Swenson qualified from his heat, but was disqualified in the semi-finals.

Swenson continued his career for several more years; in March 1975 he joined the International Track Association (ITA), a professional circuit. (Note: At the time, track and field was primarily an amateur sport, and most athletes only received under-the-table money. Professional athletes were not allowed to compete in the Olympics or other amateur meetings.) Swenson set his personal best for the mile run, 3:59.1, in an ITA meet on May 3, 1975; he was the 75th American to run a four-minute mile.
