= Craig Miller (runner) =

American middle-distance runner (born 1987)

Craig Mason Miller (born August 3, 1987 in Lancaster, Pennsylvania, United States) is an American middle-distance runner who primarily competes in 1500 meters and mile run events. He was an eight time All-American while competing for the University of Wisconsin, including a runner-up finish in the mile at the 2009 NCAA Track & Field Indoor National Championships. In 2012 he won the Road One Mile USA Championship in Minneapolis, MN and later that year finished eighth at the Olympic Trials in Eugene, OR. The following year he was second in the mile at the 2013 USA Indoor Track & Field National Championships in Albuquerque, NM.

== High school ==
Miller attended Manheim Township High School and was undefeated in the Lancaster Lebanon League Cross Country Meets, totaling 84 regular season meets and 4 league championships. Miller won the 2003, 2004, 2005 PIAA Cross Country State Championships and the 2004 and 2005 1600 meters at the PIAA Track & Field Championships. In 2004 he finished 15th place at the Foot Locker Cross Country Championships in San Diego, CA.

== College ==
Miller attended the University of Wisconsin and studied geography from 2006-2010.

Current School Record
3000 Meters: 7:49.94 (2-13-10)

8 All-American Honors
2010: Indoor 3000: 5th place (8:12.15) and Outdoor 1500: 7th place (3:48.85)
2009: Indoor Mile: 2nd place (4:01.34) and Outdoor 1500 Meters: 9th place (3:41.31)
2008: Indoor Distance Medley Relay: 3rd place (9:33.83) and Outdoor 1500 Meters: 4th place (3:42.67)
2007: Indoor Distance Medley Relay: 3rd place (9:35.81) and Outdoor 1500 Meters: 12th place (3:46.62)

== Personal bests ==
Event	Result	Venue	Date
800m	1:51.16	Madison (USA)	05.05.2007
1500m	3:35.48	Oordegem (BEL)	07.06.2013
1500m ind.	3:38.88	New York (USA)	02.15.2014
Mile	3:56.41	Walnut (USA)	04.20.2012
Mile ind.	3:55.09	New York (USA)	02.15.2014
3000m	7:54.55	Glendale (AUS)	01.29.2011
3000m ind.	7:49.05	Boston (USA)	02.08.2014
5000m	13:35.51	Palo Alto (USA)	03.29.2013
5000m ind.	14:24.11	University Park (USA)	03.01.2009
Mile Road	3:54.4h	New York (USA)	09.24.2011
Mile Road	3:53.1h	Duluth (USA)	09.08.2013
5 km Road	14:08	Carlsbad (USA)	04.03.2011
Distance Medley	9:32.84	Des Moines (USA)	04.24.2010
