= Reggie Torian =

American hurdler (born 1975)

Reginald Torian, Jr. (born April 22, 1975) is an American hurdler.

== Early years ==
Torian was born in Harvey, Illinois, the son of The Impressions lead singer Reggie Torian. He was a multi sport athlete at Thornwood High School in South Holland, Illinois.

== University of Wisconsin ==
Torian ran track and played football at the University of Wisconsin. In 2022 he was inducted into the UW Athletic Hall of Fame. In addition to winning the 1997 NCAA Division I Outdoor Track and Field Championships in the sprint hurdles, Torian was also an accomplished long jumper, placing 6th at the 1994 NCAA Division I Indoor Track and Field Championships in that event.

== Track and field career ==
Torian finished eighth at the 1998 World Cup and won a silver medal in 60 metres hurdles at the 1999 World Indoor Championships. His personal best time for the 110 meter hurdles is 13.03 seconds, achieved in June 1998 in New Orleans.
