= Morgan Groth =

American middle-distance runner (born 1943)

Morgan Groth (born August 31, 1943, in Martinez, California) is an American former middle distance runner who competed in the 1964 Summer Olympics. Oregon state university set the world record in the 2 mile relay with a time of 7:18.9 at the West Coast Relays in Fresno, California. Morgan Groth ran the anchor and NCAA half mile champion, Norm Hoffman, joined Groth to set the world record. Morgan Groth also won the first ever Golden West Invitational with a national mile record of 4:10.0 in 1961. The top ten senior mile runners in the US were invited. He later ran for the Quantico Marines.

== Olympics ==
Groth won the 800 meters at the Olympic Trials, but due in part an injury prior to the Olympics, did not qualify for the finals.

== Collegiate career ==
Groth ran collegiately for Oregon State University. He set the U.S. record for the 880 in 1965, was the NCAA champion in the mile, and was a two-time All-American. He is a member of the school's athletic hall of fame and of the Oregon Sports Hall of Fame.

Prior to college, Groth ran for Alhambra High School in his hometown of Martinez, California. In 1961, he finished second in the mile at the CIF California State Meet.
