= Jason Swarens =

American shot putter

Personal information
- Born: 31 May 2002 (age 24)

Sport
- Sport: Athletics
- Event: Shot put

Achievements and titles
- Personal best(s): Shot put: 21.37 m (Madison, 2025)
Medal record
Men's athletics
Representing United States
NACAC U23 Championships
| Silver medal – second place | 2023 San Jose | Shot put |

Jason Swarens (born 31 May 2002) is an American shot putter. He won the 2025 NCAA Championships outdoors title.

== Early life ==
He is from Terre Haute, Indiana, where he attended Terre Haute South Vigo High School. He later attended the University of Wisconsin.

== Career ==
He was runner-up to Maxwell Otterdahl at the 2023 NACAC U23 Championships in Costa Rica, with a best distance of 19.02 metres.

Competing for the University of Wisconsin he won the shot put title at the Big Ten indoor track and field championships in March 2025. He set a new personal best and school record of 21.37 metres whilst competing in Wisconsin in May 2025. In June 2025, he won the 2025 NCAA Championships title in Eugene, Oregon, with a throw of 21.23 metres.
