= Mark Winzenried =

American former middle-distance runner (born 1949)

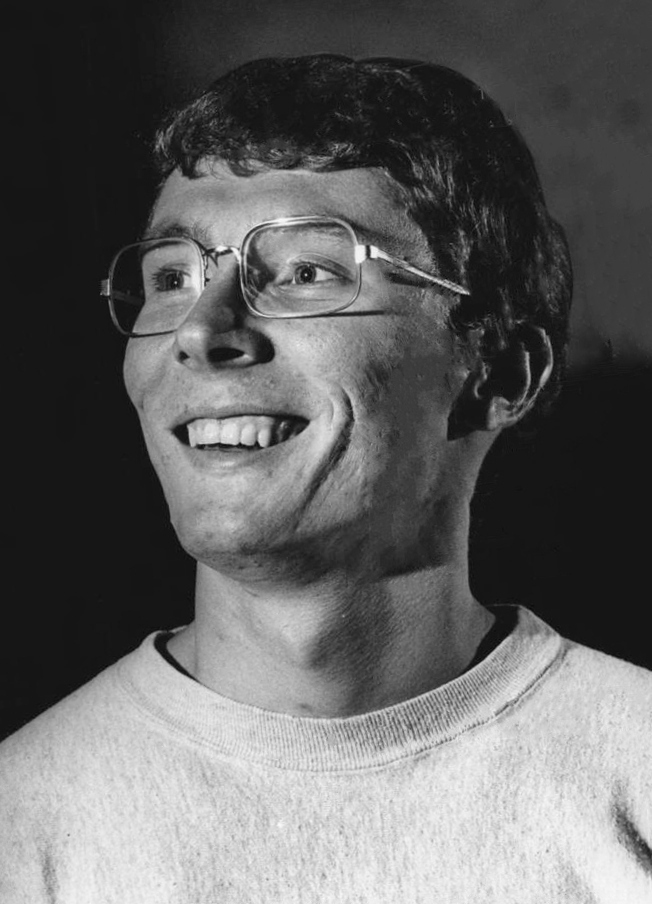
- Winzenried in 1973

Personal information
- Born: October 13, 1949 (age 76)

Sport
- Sport: Athletics
- Event(s): 800 m, mile

Achievements and titles
- Personal best(s): 800 m – 1:45.6 (1970); Mile – 3:59.5 (1972)

Mark Winzenried (born October 13, 1949) is an American former middle-distance runner. The 1971 NCAA champion at 880 yards, Winzenried narrowly missed qualifying for the American Olympic team in 1968 and was favored to qualify in 1972 until an injured Achilles tendon spoiled his chances. He held the indoor world best at the unusual distance of 1000 yards from 1972 to 1981, and still holds the world junior best in another non-standard event, 600 meters.

== Career ==
=== 1968 ===
Winzenried became a top half-miler in 1968 while a freshman at the University of Wisconsin–Madison. Winzenried traveled to Kenya and was responsible for recruiting the first Kenyans to the Wisconsin track team, beginning with Patrick Onyango Sumba. He placed second to Oregon Track Club's Wade Bell at the 1968 national championships in Sacramento, California, running 1:46.5, then his personal best. The United States Olympic Trials in 1968 were divided in two parts, with a semi-final meet in Los Angeles in late June and the final Trials at altitude in Echo Summit two and a half months later. Winzenried placed third behind Bell and Felix Johnson in the June meet, clocking 1:46.9; he had led at the bell in 51.5, but faded toward the end.

The unusual distance of 600 m was contested in a warm-up meet two weeks before the final Olympic Trials, and Winzenried took part. He placed third to quarter-milers Lee Evans and Larry James, with Evans setting a new world best of 1:14.3; James was second in 1:14.6, and Winzenried's time of 1:14.8 was also well below the previous world best. As of June 2014, his time still remains the junior (under-20) world best for the distance. Like the Trials themselves, the warm-up meet was held at altitude in Echo Summit.

At the final Trials, Winzenried narrowly missed out on making the team. He again led after the first lap (52.8), but was overtaken first by Tom Farrell (who would go on to win bronze at the Olympics) and then by Bell; again fading, he battled for the third and final Olympic spot with Ron Kutschinski down the final straight and eventually lost by a tenth of a second, 1:47.8 to 1:47.9.

=== 1969–1971 ===
Winzenried placed fifth at 880 yards at the 1969 NCAA championships in Knoxville; his time of 1:46.6 was equivalent to 1:45.9 or 1:46.0 for 800 meters and his personal best. He won his first NCAA title in 1970, winning the indoor 880 yards in 1:51.7. He placed fourth at that year's NCAA outdoor championships, won by Ken Swenson of Kansas State University. At the national (AAU) championships he finished a close second to Swenson, with both clocking the same time and Swenson winning by "an eyelash", in the words of The Sheboygan Press

Winzenried's second place qualified him to represent the United States in a series of dual meets in Europe in July 1970, including one against West Germany in Stuttgart. In the Stuttgart race he set the pace for most of the way; although he eventually only placed fourth, his time of 1:45.6 was his personal best and would remain so. The winner, Swenson, was clocked in 1:44.8, an American record for the metric distance, although Jim Ryun had run an intrinsically superior 1:44.9 for the longer 880-yard run. Track & Field News ranked Winzenried the fifth-best 800 m runner in the world in 1970, and second only to Swenson among Americans.

Winzenried repeated as NCAA indoor champion in 1971, clocking 1:50.9 for 880 yards. He also won his first and only outdoor NCAA title, triumphing in the final in 1:48.8 after running conservatively in the earlier rounds; he was the only senior in the final, and Wisconsin's only winner. However, he only placed fifth at that year's national championships; Track & Field News ranked him tenth in the world and second (to Juris Luzins) in the United States in its 1971 rankings.

=== Later career and injuries ===
Winzenried's good form continued in 1972, and he broke the indoor world best at the unusual distance of 1000 yards at the Mason-Dixon Games in Louisville, Kentucky on February 12, his time of 2:05.1 beating Ralph Doubell's 1970 record of 2:05.5 by four-tenths of a second. Winzenried's record lasted for almost nine years until Don Paige ran 2:04.9 in February 1981. (Note: Paige set his time on an eleven-laps-to-the-mile track, while Winzenried's record was set on a longer track with only eight laps to the mile. At the time, some considered eight-laps-to-the-mile tracks oversized, but they have become the norm since.)

Winzenried ran his first four-minute mile (3:59.5) in Los Angeles on March 4. Entering the 1972 Olympic Trials in Eugene, Oregon, he had the fastest time of any American at 800 meters that year (1:46.6) and was considered likely to make the team. However, he injured his Achilles tendon at the national championships two weeks before the Trials; he attempted to run at the Trials despite the injury, but only placed fifth in his heat and failed to make the semi-finals. He considered making another attempt at qualifying at his second-best distance, 1500 meters, but eventually scratched from that race.

Although Winzenried continued competing after 1972, he was never world-ranked again. He made another push at the Olympics four years later, but re-injured his Achilles tendon in late March 1976 and, unable to train properly, had to abandon his attempt.

He was inducted in the Wisconsin Badgers Hall of Fame in 2005.
