= Clare Eichner =

American long-distance runner

Personal information
- Born: December 7, 1969 (age 56)

Sport
- Sport: Track and field
Medal record
Representing United States
Summer Universiade
Gold medal – first place	1993 Buffalo	3000 m

Clare Eichner-Taylor (born December 7, 1969) is a retired female long-distance runner from the United States, who is best known for winning the women's 3000 metres at the 1993 Summer Universiade.

Representing the Wisconsin Badgers track and field team, Eichner won the 1500 m and 3000 m at the 1993 NCAA Division I Outdoor Track and Field Championships.

== Achievements ==
Year	Competition	Venue	Position	Notes
1993	Summer Universiade	Buffalo, New York, United States	1st	3,000 metres

== Personal bests ==
- 1500 metres - 4:12.71 min (1999)
- 3000 metres - 9:00.39 min (2001)
- 5000 metres - 15:26.95 min (2001)
