= Juris Luzins =

American middle-distance runner

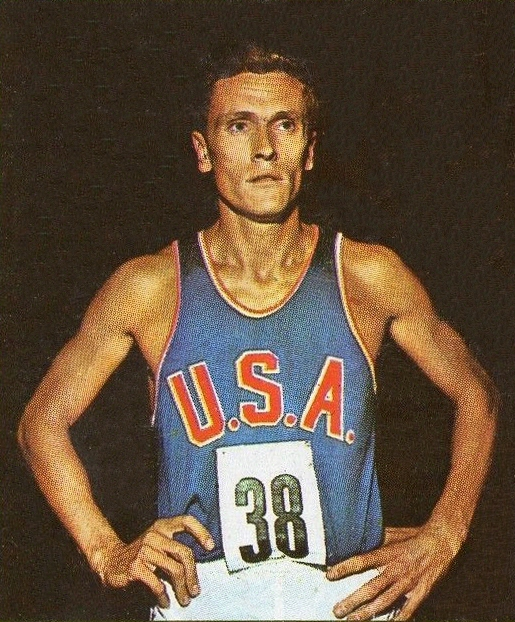

Personal information
- Born: June 22, 1947 (age 79) Virginia, U.S.
- Education: University of Florida

Sport
- Sport: Athletics
- Event(s): 800 m, mile
- Club: U.S. Marines; Florida Track Club

Achievements and titles
- Personal best(s): 800 m – 1:45.2 (1971); Mile – 3:58.2 (1972)

Juris Luzins (Latvian: Juris Luziņš; born June 22, 1947) is a retired American middle-distance runner of Latvian descent. He won the national 800 m title in 1971 and placed second in 1969. He missed the 1972 Olympics due to an injury, and later raced professionally.

Luzins competed for the William & Mary Tribe track and field team in the NCAA.

Luzins married in 1973, divorced in 1975, and remarried later. In December 1976 he earned a master's degree in architecture from the University of Florida and later worked as an architect in Gainesville, Florida.
