= Amy Wickus =

American middle-distance runner

Personal information
- Born: June 25, 1972 (age 54) Winona, Minnesota, United States

Sport
- Sport: Track and field
Medal record
Representing United States
Summer Universiade
| Gold medal – first place | 1993 Buffalo | 800m |

Amy Wickus (born June 25, 1972) is an American former middle-distance runner. She won the 800 metres title at the 1993 Summer Universiade and competed at the World Championships in 1993 and 1995.

== Career ==
Running for the Wisconsin Badgers track and field team, Wickus won the 1993, 1994, and 1995 800 meters at the NCAA Division I Indoor Track and Field Championships.

Wickus won the 800m title at the 1993 Universiade. On August 4, 1993, she ran 2:00.07 for 800m in Zurich, before going on to reach the semifinals at the 1993 World Championships in Stuttgart. At the 1995 World Championships in Gothenburg, she was eliminated in the heats, missing out on the semifinals by one place.

In June 1996 at the US Olympic Trials, Wickus finished fourth behind Regina Jacobs, Juli Henner and Vicki Huber in the 1500m final, missing out on Olympic selection. On July 5, 1996, she ran 4:06.64 for the 1500m in Oslo.

== International competitions ==
| Year | Competition | Venue | Position | Event | Notes |
Representing United States
| 1993 | Universiade | Buffalo, United States | 1st | 800 m | 2:03.72 |
| 1993 | World Championships | Stuttgart, Germany | 12th (sf) | 800 m | 2:00.55 |
| 1995 | World Championships | Gothenburg, Sweden | 15th (h) | 800 m | 2:01.38 |
(#) Indicates overall position in qualifying heats (h) or semifinals (sf)
