= Tim Nelson (runner) =

American distance runner (born 1984)

Tim Nelson (born February 27, 1984) is an American distance runner, who earned All-American honors at the University of Wisconsin–Madison and represented the US in the 2009 World Track and Field Championships.

== High school ==
Nelson hails from California where he attended Liberty Christian Academy from which he graduated in 2003. He won three California State CIF cross country championships:

- Year 2000, in a time of 15:31 (a Northern Section sophomore class record)
- Year 2001, in a time of 15:35
- Year 2002, in a time of 15:39

Over the course of his high school career Nelson qualified for two Footlocker National Championship - in 2001 and 2002.

Additionally, he won the 2002 State CIF 3200-meters title over defending champion Kyle Alcorn (Buchanan).

== University of Wisconsin ==
Nelson went on to study and run at the University of Wisconsin where he made an immediate impact on the track and field team, placing high at both the conference and regional levels in his freshman year - he qualified for the NCAA National Outdoor Track and Field Championships where he placed 10th in the men's 10,000 meters. Nelson's success on the track was defined by outdoor All-American finishes in 2005, 2006, and 2007, as well as a Big Ten title in the 5000 meters in 2007. Additionally, in cross country, Nelson helped Wisconsin win an NCAA national team championship in 2006 with an 18th-place finish in 30:06, which earned him a position as the team's 6th man.

== Nike ==
Upon graduation, Nelson ran professionally, sponsored by Nike and the Oregon TC Elite under the guidance his former coach at Wisconsin Jerry Schumacher. His major professional highlights included qualifying for the 2009 World Track and Field Championships and defeating Bernard Lagat at the USA Track & Field Outdoor Championships to take the 5000 meter title in 2010.

Nelson retired from the sport in 2013.
