= Steve Lacy (runner) =

American long-distance runner

Personal information
- Born: January 17, 1956 (age 70) McFarland, Wisconsin, United States

Stephen "Steve" Lacy (born 17 January 1956) is a two-time American Olympic athlete. He was born and raised in McFarland, Wisconsin. He went to college at the University of Wisconsin–Madison where he became the first UW runner to break the 4-minute mile.
