= Adam Spencer (runner) =

Australian runner (born 2001)

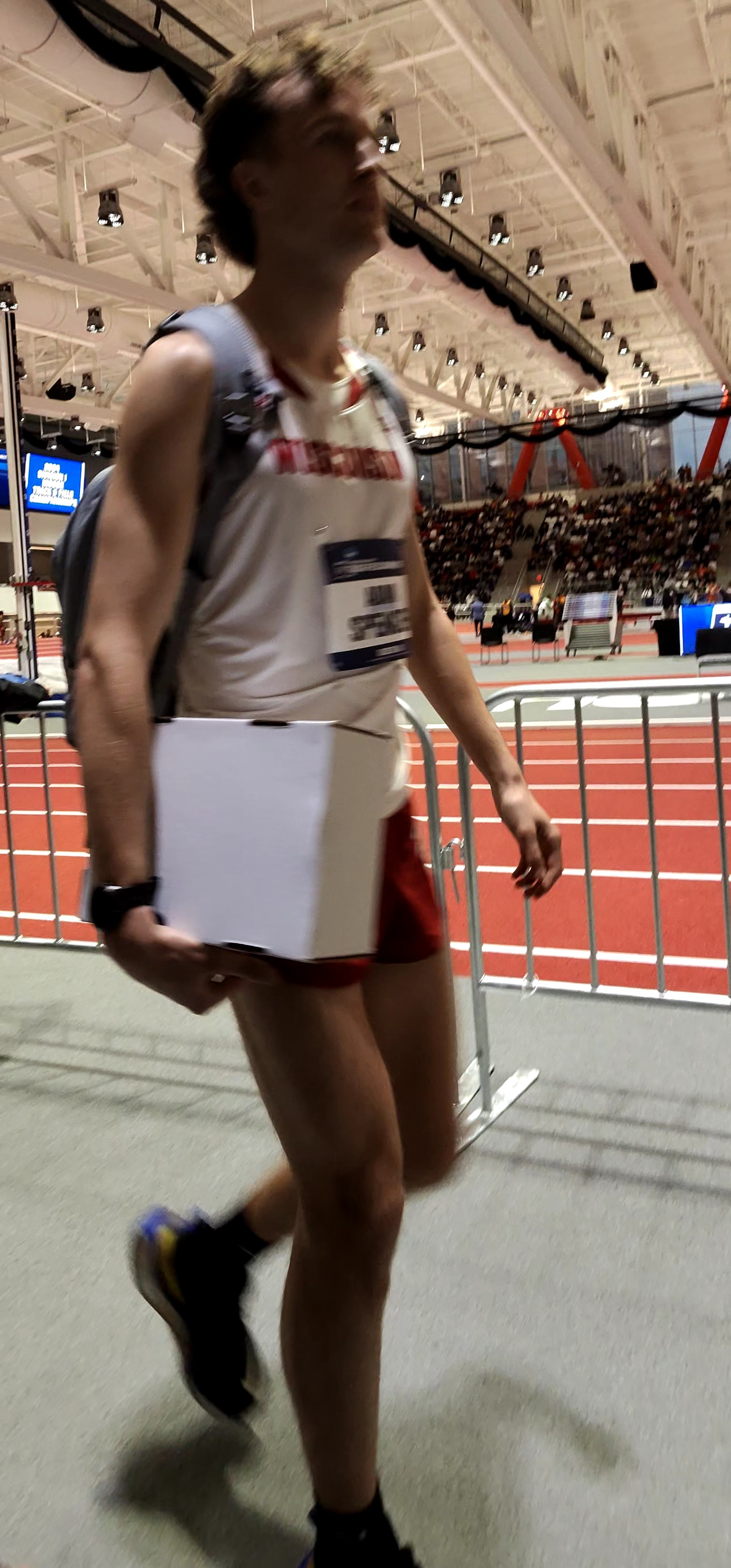
- Spencer at the 2024 NCAA Division I Indoor Track and Field Championships

Personal information
- Nationality: Australian
- Born: 4 October 2001 (age 24) McKinnon, Victoria, Australia
- Height: 1.87 m (6 ft 2 in)

Sport
- Sport: Middle, long-distance running
- Event: 800 metres – 3000 metres
- College team: Wisconsin Badgers
Medal record
Men's athletics
Representing Australia
World Indoor Championships
Bronze medal – third place	2026 Toruń	1500 m

Adam Spencer (born 4 October 2001) is an Australian middle and long-distance runner. He competes for the Wisconsin Badgers. At the 2023 London Diamond League, he ran a new personal best of 3:31.81 in the 1500 metres, making him the fourth fastest Australian of all time. This also qualified him for the 2023 World Athletics Championships and the 2024 Summer Olympics.

== Running history ==
Adam rose to prominence in the Australian running scene, competing for Wesley College Melbourne and capturing numerous APS, state, and national medals at the school. Wesley College has a strong distance running program headed by the nation's most successful junior distance-running coach, Tim O'Shaughnessy. It has produced multiple International stars, including Irish middle-distance athlete Sophie O'Sullivan and Australian racewalking national record holder Jemima Montag. Adam has an array of junior state and national titles between 800m and cross country while also obtaining sprint relay gold (4 × 400 m).

== Personal bests ==
- 800 metres – 1:46.84 (Bloomington 2023)
  - 800 metres indoor – 1:50.09 (Chicago 2023)
- 1500 metres – 3:31.81 (London 2023)
  - 1500 metres indoor – 3:35.59 (Toruń 2023)
- Mile – 3:49.21 (Berlin 2025)
  - Mile indoor – 3:52.70 (New York 2024)
- 3000 metres – 7:40.38 (Boston 2024)

== Championship results ==
Taken from World Athletics Profile

Year	Meet	Venue	Event	Place	Time
2017	Australian U17 Championships	Sydney Olympic Park	800m	1st	1:53.98
2018	Australian U18 Championships	Sydney Olympic Park	800m	3rd	1:53.56
2018	Australian U18 Championships	Sydney Olympic Park	1500m	2nd	4:00.26
2019	Australian U20 Championships	Sydney Olympic Park	800m	7th	1:55.60
2021	Australian Championships	Sydney Olympic Park	1500m	8th	3:40.86
2022	NCAA Indoor Championships	Birmingham CrossPlex	DMR	3rd	9:25.78
2022	NCAA Outdoor Championships	Hayward Field	1500m	8th	3:46.28
2023	NCAA Indoor Championships	Albuquerque Convention Center	Mile	H1 8th	4:13.71
2023	NCAA Indoor Championships	Albuquerque Convention Center	DMR	3rd	9:31.77
2023	NCAA Outdoor Championships	Mike A. Myers Stadium	1500m	3rd	3:42.98
2023	World Outdoor Championships	National Athletics Centre	1500m	SF2 13th	3:42.10
2024	NCAA Indoor Championships	The TRACK at New Balance	Mile	2nd	4:01.92
2024	NCAA Outdoor Championships	Hayward Field	1500m	3rd	3:39.80
2025	NCAA Indoor Championships	Virginia Beach Sports Center	DMR	8th	9:23.08
2025	NCAA Indoor Championships	Virginia Beach Sports Center	3000m	3rd	7:52.71
2025	NCAA Outdoor Championships	Hayward Field	1500m	4th	3:47.50
