= Cathy Branta =

American runner

Personal information
- Born: January 6, 1963 (age 63) Slinger, Wisconsin, United States

Sport
- Sport: Track and field
Medal record
Representing United States
Summer Universiade
Gold medal – first place	1985 Kobe	3000m

Cathy Easker (née Branta; born January 6, 1963) is a retired middle-distance and long-distance runner from Slinger, Wisconsin, USA. After achieving Wisconsin state championship high school record times (for division 2 girls) in cross country in both 1979 and 1980, she competed in track and cross country for the Wisconsin Badgers. While at Wisconsin, Branta won the Broderick Award (now the Honda Sports Award) as the nation's best female collegiate cross country runner for the 1984–85 season. She won the gold medal at the 1985 Summer Universiade in Kobe, Japan in the women's 3,000 metres event. She set the collegiate record in the 5,000 meters in a time of 15:07.

Cathy won the 1984 USA Cross Country Championships, qualifying her to the 1985 World Cross Country Championships, where she won the silver medal behind Zola Budd, leading USA to the team gold medal. She also qualified to the 1984 World Championships on home soil at the Meadowlands Racetrack in East Rutherford, New Jersey, where her 10th-place finish also had been a part of the USA's team gold medal.

On October 5, 1985, she married John Easker, who also went on to have a successful running career at UW. They met there during their freshman year of university.

She currently coaches high school track and cross country, and teaches physical education and health in Wittenberg-Birnamwood, WI. She is married and has three children.
