= Don Gehrmann =

American athlete (1927–2022)

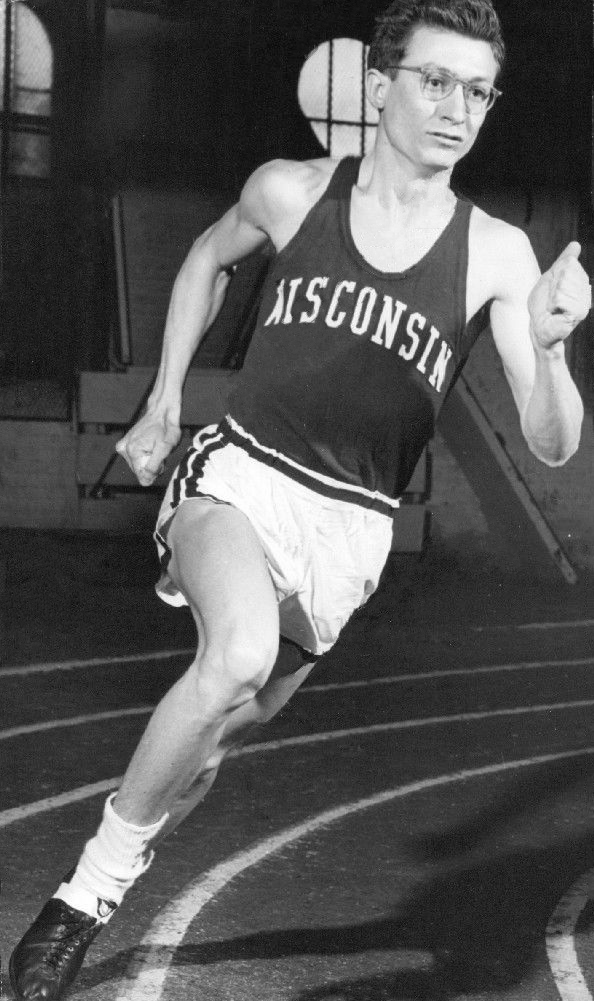
- Gehrmann in 1955

Personal information
- Born: November 16, 1927 Milwaukee, Wisconsin, U.S.
- Died: July 23, 2022 (aged 94) Stoughton, Wisconsin, U.S.
- Height: 178 cm (5 ft 10 in)
- Weight: 60 kg (132 lb)

Sport
- Sport: Middle-distance running
- Events: 800 m, 1500 m, mile
- Club: Wisconsin Badgers

Achievements and titles
- Personal bests: 800 m – 1:50.0 (1950); 1500 m – 3:50.6 (1952); Mile – 4:07.6 (1951)

Donald Arthur Gehrmann (November 16, 1927 – July 23, 2022) was an American middle-distance runner. He competed in the 1500 m final at the 1948 Olympics and placed eighth among twelve contenders. Gehrmann won the NCAA 1500 m or mile title in 1948–50. He also won the AAU indoor 1000 yd title in 1952 and 1953; outdoors he placed third in 1947 in the mile.
