= Combined events at the NCAA Division I Outdoor Track and Field Championships =

This is a list of the NCAA Division I outdoor champions in combined track and field events – the decathlon for men, and the heptathlon for women. International javelin design regulations changed in 1986, so all javelin throws before that year were using an older, more aerodynamic javelin.

== Winners ==
Key
w=wind aided
A=Altitude assisted

Women's hepathlon winners
Year	Athlete	Team	Score
1982	Jackie Joyner	UCLA Bruins	6099
1983	Jackie Joyner	UCLA Bruins	6365
1984	Sheila Tarr	UNLV Rebels	5856
1985	Lauri Young	Louisiana–Monroe Warhawks	5723
1986	Jolanda Jones	Houston Cougars	5826
1987	Jolanda Jones	Houston Cougars	6068
1988	Wendy Brown	USC Trojans	5701w
1989	Jolanda Jones	Houston Cougars	6022
1990	Gea Johnson	Arizona State Sun Devils	6132
1991	Sharon Jaklofsky-Smith (AUS)	LSU Lady Tigers	5732
1992	Anu Kaljurand (EST)	BYU Cougars	6142
1993	Kelly Blair	Oregon Ducks	6038
1994	Diane Guthrie (JAM)	George Mason Patriots	6032
1995	Diane Guthrie-Gresham (JAM)	George Mason Patriots	6527
1996	Corissa Yasen	Purdue Boilermakers	5765
1997	Tiffany Lott	BYU Cougars	6211
1998	Tiffany Lott	BYU Cougars	5982w
1999	Tracye Lawyer	Stanford Cardinal	5855w
2000	Christi Smith	Akron Zips	5797
2001	Austra Skujyté (LTU)	Kansas State Wildcats	5857
2002	Austra Skujyté (LTU)	Kansas State Wildcats	6061
2003	Hyleas Fountain	Georgia Bulldogs	5999
2004	Jackie Johnson	Arizona State Sun Devils	5807
2005	Lela Nelson	Eastern Michigan Eagles	5878
2006	Jackie Johnson	Arizona State Sun Devils	5939
2007	Jacquelyn Johnson	Arizona State Sun Devils	5984
2008	Jacquelyn Johnson	Arizona State Sun Devils	6053
2009	Brianne Theisen	Oregon Ducks	6086
2010	Brianne Theisen (CAN)	Oregon Ducks	6094
2011	Ryann Kraiss	Kansas State Wildcats	5961
2012	Brianne Theisen	Oregon Ducks	6440
2013	Lindsay Vollmer	Kansas Jayhawks	6086
2014	Kendell Williams	Georgia Bulldogs	5854
2015	Akela Jones (BAR)	Kansas State Wildcats	6,371
2016	Kendell Williams	Georgia Bulldogs	6225
2017	Kendell Williams	Georgia Bulldogs	6265
2018	Georgia Ellenwood (CAN)	Wisconsin Badgers	6146
2019	Ashtin Zamzow	Texas Longhorns	6222
2020	Cancelled due to the COVID-19 pandemic		
2021	Tyra Gittens	Texas A&M Aggies	6285
2022	Anna Hall	Florida Gators	6385
2023	Pippi Lotta Enok (EST)	Oklahoma Sooners	6165
2024	Timara Chapman (USA)	Texas A&M Aggies	6339
2025	Pippi Lotta Enok (EST)	Oklahoma Sooners	6285
2026	Sofia Cosculluela (SPA)	Washington Huskies	6182

Men's decathlon winners
Year	Athlete	Team	Points
1970	Rick Wanamaker	Drake Bulldogs	7406
1971	Ray Hupp	Ohio State Buckeyes	7456
1972	Ron Evans	UConn Huskies	7571
1973	Raimo Pihl (SWE)	BYU Cougars	7782
1974	Runald Beckman (SWE)	BYU Cougars	7874
1975	Raimo Pihl (SWE)	BYU Cougars	8079A
1976	Ed Miller	California Golden Bears	7443
1977	Tito Steiner (ARG)	BYU Cougars	7659
1978	Mauricio Bardales	UC Irvine Anteaters	8007
1979	Tito Steiner (ARG)	BYU Cougars	7918
1980	Mark Anderson	UCLA Bruins	7893
1981	Tito Steiner (ARG)	BYU Cougars	8279
1982	Trond Skramstad (NOR)	Mount St. Mary's Mountaineers	7770A
1983	Kerry Zimmerman	Indiana Hoosiers	7810
1984	Rob Muzzio	George Mason Patriots	8227
1985	Rob Muzzio	George Mason Patriots	7964
1986	Mike Ramos	Washington Huskies	8261
1987	Jim Connolly	UCLA Bruins	8121
1988	Mikael Olander (SWE)	LSU Tigers	8021
1989	Derek Huff	Arizona Wildcats	8020A
1990	Drew Fucci	Texas State Bobcats	7922
1991	Aric Long	Tennessee Volunteers	7916
1992	Brian Brophy	Tennessee Volunteers	8276
1993	Chris Huffins	California Golden Bears	8007
1994	Enoch Borozinski	Nevada Wolf Pack	7870
1995	Mario Sategna	LSU Tigers	8172
1996	Victor Houston (BAR)	Auburn Tigers	7766
1997	James Dunkleberger	Wisconsin Badgers	7924
1998	Klaus Ambrosch (AUT)	Arizona Wildcats	7825w
1999	Tom Pappas	Tennessee Volunteers	8184
2000	Bevan Hart	California Golden Bears	8002
2001	Santiago Lorenzo (ARG)	Oregon Ducks	7889
2002	Claston Bernard (JAM)	LSU Tigers	8094
2003	Stephen Harris	Tennessee Volunteers	8061
2004	Ryan Harlan	Rice Owls	8171
2005	Trey Hardee	Texas Longhorns	7881
2006	Jake Arnold	Arizona Wildcats	7870
2007	Jake Arnold	Arizona Wildcats	8215
2008	Ashton Eaton	Oregon Ducks	8055
2009	Ashton Eaton	Oregon Ducks	8241
2010	Ashton Eaton	Oregon Ducks	8457
2011	Michael Morrison	California Golden Bears	8118
2012	Kurt Felix (GRN)	Boise State Broncos	8062
2013	Johannes Hock (GER)	Texas Longhorns	8267
2014	Maicel Uibo (EST)	Georgia Bulldogs	8182
2015	Maicel Uibo (EST)	Georgia Bulldogs	8356
2016	Lindon Victor (GRN)	Texas A&M Aggies	8379
2017	Lindon Victor (GRN)	Texas A&M Aggies	8390
2018	Tim Duckworth (GBR)	Kentucky Wildcats	8336
2019	Johannes Erm (EST)	Georgia Bulldogs	8352
2020	Canceled due to COVID-19		
2021	Karel Tilga (EST)	Georgia Bulldogs	8261
2022	Ayden Owens‑Delerme (PUR)	Arkansas Razorbacks	8457
2023	Leo Neugebauer (GER)	Texas Longhorns	8836
2024	Leo Neugebauer (GER)	Texas Longhorns	8961
2025	Peyton Bair (USA)	Mississippi State Bulldogs	8323
2026	Ben Barton (USA)	BYU Cougars	8169
