= Bowling Green Falcons track and field =

College track and field team

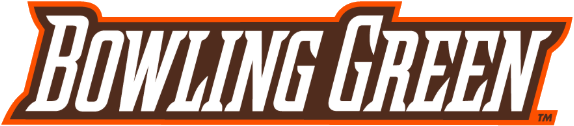
- University: Bowling Green State University
- Head coach: Lou Snelling
- Conference: MAC
- Location: Bowling Green, Ohio
- Outdoor track: Whittaker Track
- Nickname: Falcons
- Colors: Brown and orange

The Bowling Green Falcons track and field team is the track and field program that represents Bowling Green State University. The Falcons compete in NCAA Division I as a member of the Mid-American Conference. The team is based in Bowling Green, Ohio, at the Whittaker Track.

The program is coached by Lou Snelling. The track and field program officially encompasses four teams because the NCAA considers men's and women's indoor track and field and outdoor track and field as separate sports.

Middle-distance runner Dave Wottle won the 1972 Olympic gold medal in the 800 meters while competing on the Bowling Green Falcons team. In 2023, he became the first Mid-American Conference athlete to be inducted into the United States Track and Field and Cross Country Coaches Association Hall of Fame.

In March 2002, the university announced they would cut the men's track and field teams at the end of the school year. Alumni opposed the cuts, and athletes including Sid Sink lamented the cuts through 2020.

== Postseason ==
=== AIAW ===
The Falcons have had one AIAW All-American finishing in the top six at the AIAW indoor or outdoor championships.

AIAW All-Americans
| Championships | Name | Event | Place |
|---|---|---|---|
| 1976 Outdoor | Debbie Romsek | 400 meters hurdles | 4th |

=== NCAA ===
As of August 2025, a total of 8 men and 8 women have achieved individual first-team All-American status for the team at the Division I men's outdoor, women's outdoor, men's indoor, or women's indoor national championships (using the modern criteria of top-8 placing regardless of athlete nationality).

First team NCAA All-Americans
| Team | Championships | Name | Event | Place | Ref. |
|---|---|---|---|---|---|
| Men's | 1960 Outdoor | Walter Killian | High jump | 7th | |
| Men's | 1960 Outdoor | Bernie Casey | 110 meters hurdles | 4th | |
| Men's | 1965 Outdoor | Henry Williams | 100 meters | 5th | |
| Men's | 1965 Outdoor | Bob Pratt | 4 × 100 meters relay | 7th | |
| Men's | 1965 Outdoor | Rich Greenberg | 4 × 100 meters relay | 7th | |
| Men's | 1965 Outdoor | Tom Wright | 4 × 100 meters relay | 7th | |
| Men's | 1965 Outdoor | Henry Williams | 4 × 100 meters relay | 7th | |
| Men's | 1965 Outdoor | Tom Wright | 4 × 400 meters relay | 6th | |
| Men's | 1965 Outdoor | Ralph Canady | 4 × 400 meters relay | 6th | |
| Men's | 1965 Outdoor | Henry Williams | 4 × 400 meters relay | 6th | |
| Men's | 1965 Outdoor | Bob Classen | 4 × 400 meters relay | 6th | |
| Men's | 1966 Indoor | Henry Williams | 4 × 400 meters relay | 4th | |
| Men's | 1966 Indoor | Tom Wright | 4 × 400 meters relay | 4th | |
| Men's | 1966 Indoor | Ralph Canady | 4 × 400 meters relay | 4th | |
| Men's | 1966 Indoor | Bob Classen | 4 × 400 meters relay | 4th | |
| Men's | 1966 Outdoor | Tom Wright | 4 × 400 meters relay | 5th | |
| Men's | 1966 Outdoor | Bob Classen | 4 × 400 meters relay | 5th | |
| Men's | 1966 Outdoor | Ralph Canady | 4 × 400 meters relay | 5th | |
| Men's | 1966 Outdoor | Henry Williams | 4 × 400 meters relay | 5th | |
| Men's | 1969 Outdoor | Sid Sink | 3000 meters steeplechase | 4th | |
| Men's | 1969 Outdoor | Sid Sink | 5000 meters | 8th | |
| Men's | 1970 Indoor | Dave Wottle | Mile run | 4th | |
| Men's | 1970 Outdoor | Dave Wottle | Mile run | 2nd | |
| Men's | 1970 Outdoor | Sid Sink | 3000 meters steeplechase | 1st | |
| Men's | 1971 Indoor | Sid Sink | 3000 meters | 2nd | |
| Men's | 1971 Outdoor | Sid Sink | 3000 meters steeplechase | 1st | |
| Men's | 1971 Outdoor | Sid Sink | 5000 meters | 5th | |
| Men's | 1972 Indoor | Dave Wottle | 800 meters | 1st | |
| Men's | 1972 Indoor | Sid Sink | 3000 meters | 1st | |
| Men's | 1972 Indoor | Craig MacDonald | Distance medley relay | 1st | |
| Men's | 1972 Indoor | Ted Farver | Distance medley relay | 1st | |
| Men's | 1972 Indoor | Sid Sink | Distance medley relay | 1st | |
| Men's | 1972 Indoor | Dave Wottle | Distance medley relay | 1st | |
| Men's | 1972 Outdoor | Dave Wottle | 1500 meters | 1st | |
| Men's | 1973 Indoor | Dave Wottle | Mile run | 1st | |
| Men's | 1973 Outdoor | Dave Wottle | Mile run | 1st | |
| Men's | 1979 Indoor | John Anich | Distance medley relay | 5th | |
| Men's | 1979 Indoor | Ivor Emmanuel | Distance medley relay | 5th | |
| Men's | 1979 Indoor | Kevin Ryan | Distance medley relay | 5th | |
| Men's | 1979 Indoor | Bob Lunn | Distance medley relay | 5th | |
| Men's | 1980 Outdoor | Kevin Ryan | 1500 meters | 5th | |
| Men's | 1981 Indoor | Terry Reedus | 4 × 800 meters relay | 5th | |
| Men's | 1981 Indoor | Dave Agosta | 4 × 800 meters relay | 5th | |
| Men's | 1981 Indoor | Chuck Pullom | 4 × 800 meters relay | 5th | |
| Men's | 1981 Indoor | Jeff Brown | 4 × 800 meters relay | 5th | |
| Men's | 1981 Indoor | Terry Reedus | Distance medley relay | 6th | |
| Men's | 1981 Indoor | John Anich | Distance medley relay | 6th | |
| Men's | 1981 Indoor | Steve Housley | Distance medley relay | 6th | |
| Men's | 1981 Indoor | Jeff Brown | Distance medley relay | 6th | |
| Women's | 1988 Indoor | Tracy Gaetke | 800 meters | 8th | |
| Women's | 1988 Outdoor | Beth Manson | Discus throw | 8th | |
| Women's | 1989 Outdoor | Beth Manson | Discus throw | 6th | |
| Men's | 1993 Outdoor | Todd Black | 800 meters | 8th | |
| Men's | 1994 Indoor | Scott Thompson | 55 meters hurdles | 5th | |
| Women's | 1994 Indoor | Nikki Lessig | Shot put | 7th | |
| Men's | 1994 Outdoor | Scott Thompson | 110 meters hurdles | 3rd | |
| Women's | 1995 Indoor | Nikki Lessig | Shot put | 7th | |
| Men's | 1997 Indoor | Rah'Sheen Clay | 200 meters | 7th | |
| Women's | 1997 Outdoor | Emily Cokinos | Javelin throw | 7th | |
| Women's | 1998 Indoor | Huina Han | Triple jump | 4th | |
| Women's | 1998 Outdoor | Huina Han | Triple jump | 6th | |
| Women's | 2001 Outdoor | Stephanie Heidt | High jump | 7th | |
| Women's | 2013 Outdoor | Brooke Pleger | Hammer throw | 7th | |
| Women's | 2014 Outdoor | Brooke Pleger | Hammer throw | 3rd | |
| Women's | 2015 Outdoor | Brooke Pleger | Hammer throw | 3rd | |
| Women's | 2019 Indoor | Aliyah Gustafson | Shot put | 7th | |

== See also ==
- Category:Bowling Green Falcons men's track and field athletes (2)
