= Art Venegas =

Track and field coach

Personal information
- Born: Arturo Venegas; December 5, 1951 (age 74) Tepic, Mexico
- Occupations: Track and Field coach
- Employers: USA Track and Field 2010-2017, UCLA 1982-2009, Cal State Long Beach 1979-1982, Cal State Northridge 1976-1979
- Spouse: Marlene Venegas

Arturo "Art" Venegas (born 1951) is a former track and field coach, specializing in the throwing events. During his coaching career, Venegas led 63 athletes to conference titles, and he coached 33 throwers to NCAA championships. Upon induction to their hall of fame, the U.S. Track & Field and Cross Country Coaches Association (USTFCCCA) said that he "left an indelible mark on the sport of track & field for over 40 years".

Venegas coached twelve Olympic athletes directly and he designed strength training programs to augment the training regimens of Olympic sprint medalists Mike Marsh, Ato Bolden, Steve Lewis, and Kevin Young. He also was the throwing event coach of Olympic multiple heptathlon (and long jump) gold medalist Jackie Joyner-Kersee, coaching her throwing and guiding her in strength training. Sports Illustrated voted Jackie the "athlete of the 20th Century" at the close of the millennium.

== Early life and education ==
Venegas was born in Tepic, Mexico in 1951. He attended Saint Genevieve High School in Panorama City, where he distinguished himself as a standout track and field athlete in the shot put and discus throw. Upon graduation, Venegas enrolled at California State University, Northridge (CSUN), lettering in track and field four times and earning Division II All-American honors as a hammer thrower. Venegas graduated from CSUN with a double major in Spanish and political science.

== Career ==
=== Early career ===
In 1976 Venegas joined the CSUN coaching staff, leading the track and field throwing program. The Matadors, led by NCAA shot put champion Joe Staub, became a Division II contender—finishing third overall in the 1979 NCAA, Division II Outdoor Track and Field Championships. During Venegas’ three years at CSUN, Matador throwers were named All-American nine times. In 1979, Cal State Long Beach (CSULB) head track coach, Cliff Abel, hired Venegas to coach the 49ers’ throwing events. He helped Long Beach State athletes Bill Green (hammer throw) and Mike Smith (shot put) both earn All-American honors, and in 1981 set still-standing school records. In the two years Venegas coached at the university, his athletes broke three of four throwing event school records. In 1984 Smith reached the Olympic Trials in the shot put, while Green set three NCAA and three American records in the hammer throw in 1983 and 1984, later placing fifth in the summer Olympic Games in Los Angeles.

=== UCLA ===
Following Venegas’ run at CSULB, then Bruin head coach Jim Bush asked him to join the UCLA coaching staff as its throwing events coach, and it was in Westwood that Art Venegas cemented his reputation. During twenty-eight years at UCLA, Bruin throwers would amass thirty-three NCAA championships, sixty-seven conference titles and claim more than one-hundred and seventy-five All-American awards. Between the years 1990 and 2002, Bruin throwers won either an NCAA indoor or outdoor title in all but four years, and in the years 1991, 1993, 1995, and in 1995 and 1996 Venegas’ athletes won NCAA championships in both the men’s and women’s divisions. In the 1995 NCAA meet UCLA throwers won five titles, and as a group of 8 events (men and women) scored enough points to place third overall in the larger team competition-a feat never repeated prior or since. The top two men's shot putters in NCAA history are Art Venegas throwers: John Brenner and John Godina, who between them have held the collegiate record for over 41 years. Four Bruins coached by Venegas established collegiate records: Valeyta Althouse, Dawn Dumble, John Godina and John Brenner—who went on to break the American record in the shot put. Six of Venegas' Bruin charges became Olympians: Brian Blutreich, Jessica Cosby, Veleyata Althouse, Suzy Powell, Seilala Sua and John Godina. Godina won, in addition to two Olympic medals, the World Championships three times and Sua became the winningest female athlete in NCAA history with seven titles. Venegas also coached to the 1996 NCAA indoor shot put title Jonathan Ogden, who later became a Super Bowl champion and Pro Football Hall of Fame inductee. Upon UCLA head coach Bob Larsen's retirement in 1999, Art Venegas was selected to direct the UCLA track program as head coach. The Venegas-led Bruins earned four consecutive Mountain Pacific Sports Federation (MPSF) championships, back-to-back NCAA West Region team championships in 2003 and 2004, and the Pacific Ten Championship in 2004. During the Venegas head coaching era, fifty-four Bruins achieved All-American honors, twenty-four won individual PAC 10 titles and fifteen gained Western Regional individual crowns.

While at UCLA in 1994, Venegas was a defendant in a defamation lawsuit by Brent Noon, who alleged that Venegas spread rumors through the track community about Noon using steroids, which resulted in schools not recruiting him. They reached an undisclosed six-figure settlement outside of court. Two years later Noon tested positive for performance enhancing drugs, and was suspended for four years.

=== Olympic Training Center ===
After Venegas completed his stint at UCLA, Terry Crawford, the USTAF Director of Coaching, asked him to join the USA coaching team as a performance consultant at the United States Olympic Training Center in Chula Vista, California. Former British throws coach, Shaun Pickering, opined that Crawford’s overture may have been, at least in part, because at that juncture the US jumpers had been outpacing their throwing counterparts. Venegas said that among his goals at the Olympic Training Center was “to provide structure on a day-to-day basis” for the U.S. throwing contingent and ultimately to develop “a school of throwers.” That school of throwers eventually included: Tia Brooks, ranked number five in the world in 2016; Whitney Ashley, 2016 Olympic Trials champion; Darrell Hill, 2017 Diamond League champion, and Joe Kovacs, multiple world champion and three time Olympic silver medalist. When Kovacs and Hill both exceeded 73.6 feet (22.44m) in the shot put in 2017 it made Venegas the first coach in history to have athletes use both the traditional glide technique (John Brenner, 1986), and the modern spin technique (Joe Kovacs, 2015), (Darrell Hill, 2017) to reach the milestone 73' level. No other coach has had even two athletes throw 73', and Venegas has had three exceed six inches beyond that distance. Cyrus Hostetler said of Venegas, "Art coaching any one of these athletes would prove a successful coach, let alone all of them." Following the Rio de Janeiro Olympics, Venegas retired as an active coach in 2017.

==== Olympic athletes coached by Art Venegas ====
- Bill Green – Men’s Hammer Throw (Los Angeles, 1984)
- John Godina – Men’s Shot Put, (Atlanta, 1996 & Sydney, 2000)
- Brian Blutreich – Men’s Discus, (Barcelona, 1992)
- Joe Kovacs – Men’s Shot Put, (Rio de Janeiro, 2016; Tokyo, 2020; Paris, 2024)
- Darrell Hill – Men’s Shot Put, (Rio de Janeiro, 2016)
- Jessica Cosby – Women’s Hammer Throw, (Beijing, 2008)
- Seilala Sua – Women’s Discus, (Sydney, 2000)
- Whitney Ashley – Women’s Discus, (Rio de Janeiro, 2016)
- Suzy Powell – Women’s Discus, (Atlanta,1996; Sydney, 2000; Beijing, 2008)
- Tia Brooks – Women’s Shot Put, (Rio de Janeiro, 2016)
- Valeyta Althouse – Women’s Shot Put, (Atlanta, 1996)
- Nada Kawar – Women’s Shot Put, (Atlanta, 1996; Sydney, 2000)

=== Later career ===
In 1987, Venegas was the featured speaker on the throws at the International Amateur Athletic Federation (IAAF) European Coaching Conference, and he was subsequently selected to keynote the Pan Am Coaches Conference in San Antonio, Texas. In 1992, Coach Venegas tacked slightly away from the throwing events to deliver the keynote on strength training as the featured speaker at the IAAF strength symposium in Salinas, Puerto Rico. At the invitation of the IAAF, Venegas coordinated a weeklong training camp for British throwers in London, and he worked with the Spanish national throws team in Madrid, Spain in 1988.

In 1998, Venegas was named one of the "100 Most Influential Hispanics in the U.S." by Hispanic Business Magazine, and in 2022, he was inducted into the United States Track and Field and Cross-Country Coaches Association (USTFCCCA) Hall of Fame.

=== Coaching tree ===
In Venegas's coaching career 19 of his former athletes went on to become collegiate coaches themselves. Among the more notable:

- Don Babbitt (Santa Monica College, Cal State Los Angeles, University of Georgia)
- Brian Blutreich (University of Oregon, Arizona State, University of North Carolina-Chapel Hill, University of Oklahoma, University of California-Santa Barbara)
- John Frazier (Texas State, UCLA, University of Tennessee, University of Arizona, University of Florida, Humboldt State, Cal State Los Angeles, Cal State Northridge)
- Eric Werskey (University of Florida, University of Iowa, Cal State Northridge)
- Dawn Dumble (Arizona State University, University of Florida)
- Andrew Ninow (University of Oklahoma)
- Dave Dumble (Oregon State University, Arizona State University, Virginia Tech University)
- Seilala Sua (UCLA, Cal State Northridge, University of Hawaii)

== Personal life ==
Art Venegas met his wife while they were students at Cal State Northridge.
