= Rick Sloan =

American decathlete

Personal information
- Nationality: American
- Born: November 10, 1946 (age 79) Fullerton, California, United States

Sport
- Sport: Athletics
- Event: Decathlon

Rick Sloan (born November 10, 1946) is an American decathlete and coach. He competed in the men's decathlon at the 1968 Summer Olympics in Mexico City. There, he placed first in the individual high jump and pole vault events and ultimately finished seventh.

Prior competing in the Olympics, Sloan was an All-American athlete for the UCLA Bruins track and field team, finishing sixth in the high jump at the 1967 NCAA University Division outdoor track and field championships and fourth in the pole vault at the 1967 NCAA University Division outdoor track and field championships.

Following his competitive career, Sloan entered coaching, serving as head coach of track and field at Washington State University from 1994 to 2014. Since 2016, he has served as the MPSF Indoor Track & Field Head of Officials. Sloan also served as the longtime personal coach for Olympic gold medalist Dan O'Brien.
