= Dick Railsback =

American pole vaulter (1946–2021)

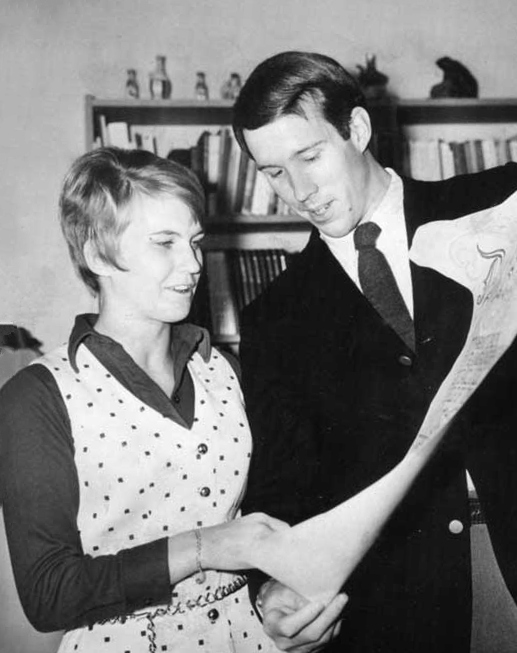
- Annika Rohlén and Railsback

Personal information
- Born: March 19, 1946 Pasadena, California
- Died: June 30, 2021 (aged 75) Boise, Idaho

Sport
- Sport: Athletics
- Event: Pole vault
- Club: Gefle IF (1969–71)

Achievements and titles
- Personal best: 5.40 m (1969)

Richard ‘Dick’ Railsback (March 19, 1946 – June 30, 2021) was an American pole vaulter. In 1967 he was ranked fifth in the world.

Railsback was an All-American pole vaulter for the UCLA Bruins track and field team, finishing 3rd at the 1967 NCAA University Division outdoor track and field championships.

In 1968 he won the national title, but placed fourth at the Olympic Trials and was not selected for the 1968 Olympic team. He attended the 1976 Summer Olympics as a coach for the American athletics team.

In August 1970 Railsback married Annika Rohlén, an interpreter during his 1967 visit to Sweden. In 1969–71 he mostly stayed in Sweden and competed for Gefle IF. Dick and Annika have a daughter Michelle and son Michael. Both were born and raised in Lincoln, Nebraska, but spent every summer in Sweden until ca. 2001; they hold dual citizenship and speak Swedish. Both competed for Gefle IF in hurdle running, and Michelle also in the pole vault and flat running.
