= Tia Brooks =

American shot putter

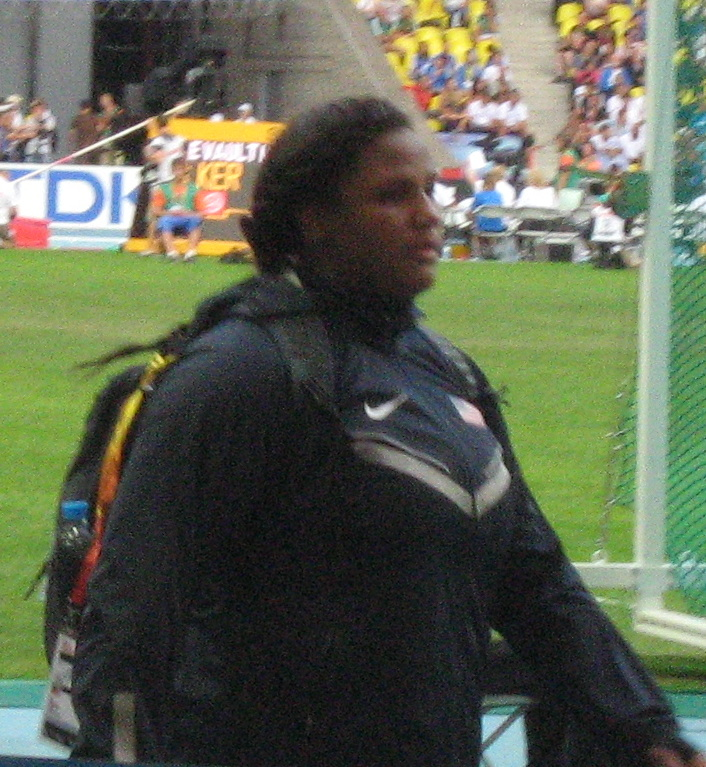
- Brooks in 2013

Personal information
- Nationality: American
- Born: August 2, 1990 (age 36)
- Height: 1.83 m (6 ft 0 in)
- Weight: 109 kg (240 lb)

Sport
- Sport: Track and field
- Event: Shot put
- College team: Oklahoma Sooners ('09-'14)
- Club: Nike
- Coached by: Art Venagas

Achievements and titles
- Personal bests: Shot put (outdoor): 19,73m Shot put (indoor): 19,22m

Tia Ra'shone Brooks (August 2, 1990) is an American shot putter. In 2011, she placed second in the shot put at both the NCAA Indoor and Outdoor Championships. In 2012, she won both events before competing at the US Olympic Trials. At the Trials, she placed third in the shot put and qualified to represent the United States at the 2012 Summer Olympics. She placed 19th at the Olympics. Also in 2012, she was a Bowerman Award semifinalist.

She is the American collegiate record holder indoors with her personal record of 19.22 m (63 ft 1/2 in).

== Early life ==
Tia Ra'shone Brooks was born August 2, 1990, in Saginaw, Michigan, to parents Cyd D. Neal and David Brooks. At East Kentwood High School, she primarily ran sprint events before her coach, John Makinen convinced her that she was better suited for throwing events. Initially, she fought the change and threatened to quit track and field. "I didn't really want to throw the shot put," she explained. "I didn't want to be the stereotypical thrower ... the big girl who didn't run and wasn't athletic." After a heart-to-heart talk with her mother, Brooks relented. During high school, she was a four-time all-state honoree and a two-time regional champion. In her final year, she won the 2008 state title with a 14.65 m (48' 0 1/2"). She finished second in both the discus and shot put at the Midwest Meet of Champions.

Brooks attended University of Oklahoma. During her first year, she lost feeling in her legs while lifting weights and had to be carried out on a spine board. She was diagnosed with degenerative disc disorder, two bulging discs, and a narrowing of the spine. Her doctor advised her to give up the shot put, but Brooks pressed on. After a year of rehab and strength training, she returned to the sport in 2010. She graduated from Oklahoma in 2013.

== University of Oklahoma ==
In 2010, Brooks finished fourth in the shot put at the US Championships with a new personal best distance of 17.37 m (56 ft 11 3/4 in). In 2011, she was the runner-up in the shot put at both the NCAA Indoor and Outdoor Championships. At the national championships, she finished fifth. During the season, she upped her personal best to 18.00 m (59 ft 1/2 in) (outdoor) and finished the year ranked fourth in the country.

In 2012, Brooks won the shot put at the NCAA Indoor Championship with a distance of 19.00 m (62 ft 4 in). She went on to win the Outdoor Championships as well, turning in a throw of 18.44 m (60 ft 5 3/4 in). She was named first team All-American in both the indoor and outdoor events and was a Bowerman Award semifinalist, an award given annually to the country's top track and field student-athlete.

At the 2012 US Olympic Trials, Brooks threw the shot put 18.34 m (60 ft 2 in) on her second attempt. The distance held up and she won third place. The throw qualified her to compete in the 2012 Summer Olympics. Afterwards she said, "It's so surreal. When I found out I made it, I cried."

Brooks entered the Olympics seeded 16th. In the qualification round of the shot put, she finished 11th in her group with a distance of 17.72 m (58 ft 1 1/2 in). Her throw placed her 19th overall and was well short of the 18.45 m (60 ft 6 1/4 in) necessary to make the top eight and advance to the finals. Brooks was joined at the Olympics by Oklahoma teammate and close friend Brittany Borman, who won the javelin at The Olympic Trials.

At the start of the 2013 season she defended her NCAA indoor title with a throw of 19.22 m (63 ft 1/2 in), breaking Laura Gerraughty's American collegiate record.

Brooks was coached by former Olympian, Brian Blutreich. Her college outdoor best, set during 2012, is 18.47 m (60 ft 7 in) (outdoor). She holds two school records in the shot put.

== Professional ==
Tia competed in the 2013 USA Outdoor Track and Field Championships where she earned silver medal in shot put with a throw of 18.83 m (61 ft 9 1/4 in).
Tia competed in the 2013 World Championships in Athletics – Women's shot put where she placed 8th in the shot put final with a throw of 18.09 m (59 ft 4 in).
Tia competed in the 2014 USA Outdoor Track and Field Championships in Sacramento, California, where she earned bronze medal in shot put with a throw of 18.83 m 61' 9 1/2".
Tia is represented by Nike and trains at the Olympic Training Center in San Diego, California under the tutelage of Art Venegas.
Tia won the silver medal in the shot put at 2015 USA Outdoor Track and Field Championships in 18.93 m (62 ft 1 1/4 in) which is the 7th best throw in the world in 2015 as of July 5.
Tia represented USA in 2015 World Championships in Athletics placing 13th in shot put in 17.71 m (58 ft 1 in).
Tia competed in the 2016 United States Olympic Trials (track and field) where she placed 4th in the shot put final with a throw of 18.94 m (62 ft 1 1/2 in).

== Personal life ==
Brooks attended East Kentwood High School where she played varsity on their track team. Brooks currently lives in Kentwood, Michigan. She has four siblings: Tor'i and DeMarcus Brooks, David Brooks Jr., and Teiah Faulk.
