= 1996 NCAA Division I Outdoor Track and Field Championships =

- Men's Champion: Arkansas (6th title); Women's Champion: LSU (10th title)
- Edition: 75th (Men); 15th (Women)
- Dates: May 29 − June 1, 1996
- Host city: Eugene, Oregon
- Venue: Hayward Field; University of Oregon

Final day broadcast

The 1996 NCAA Division I Outdoor Track and Field Championships were contested May 29 – June 1 at Hayward Field at the University of Oregon in Eugene, Oregon in order to determine the individual and team national champions of men's and women's collegiate Division I outdoor track and field events in the United States.

These were the 75th annual men's championships and the 15th annual women's championships. This was the Ducks' eighth time hosting the event and the first since 1991.

In a repeat of the previous four years' results, Arkansas and LSU topped the men's and women's team standings, respectively; it was the Razorbacks' sixth men's team title and the tenth for the Lady Tigers. This was the fifth of eight consecutive titles for Arkansas. The Lady Tigers, meanwhile, won their tenth consecutive title and, ultimately, the tenth of eleven consecutive titles they won between 1987 and 1997.

== Team results ==
- Note: Top 10 only
- (H) = Hosts
- Full results

=== Men's standings ===
Rank	Team	Points
1st place, gold medalist(s)	Arkansas	55
2nd place, silver medalist(s)	George Mason	40
3rd place, bronze medalist(s)	UCLA	37
4	North Carolina	30
5	Texas	27
6	Wisconsin	26
7	LSU	24
8	Arizona; Wake Forest	20
10	Colorado; Iowa State; Nebraska; SMU; USC; Tennessee	19

=== Women's standings ===
Rank	Team	Points
1st place, gold medalist(s)	LSU	81
2nd place, silver medalist(s)	Texas	52
3rd place, bronze medalist(s)	SMU	50
4	Illinois	43
5	North Carolina	35
6	Georgetown	34
7	USC	31
8	Nebraska	29
9	South Carolina; UCLA	26
