= Jessica Cosby =

American hammer thrower

Personal information
- Born: May 31, 1982 (age 44) Los Angeles, California, U.S.
- Height: 1.73 m (5 ft 8 in)
- Weight: 79 kg (174 lb)

Sport
- Country: United States
- Sport: Athletics
- Event: Hammer throw
- Updated on August 14, 2012

Jessica Cosby (born May 31, 1982) is an American hammer thrower. She competed at the 2007 World Championships and the 2008 Olympic Games without reaching the final. Her personal best throw is 74.2 metres, achieved on May 22, 2014, in Tucson, Arizona.

Competing for the UCLA Bruins track and field team, Cosby won the shot put at the 2002 NCAA Division I Outdoor Track and Field Championships.

Shortly after the 2009 Championships, she failed a random, out-of-competition drug test. She explained that the banned diuretic had entered her system as a result of taking a water pill to aid urination. Cosby said that depression, brought on by a series of personal and sporting setbacks (including losing her coach and her job), had left her unable to pass water and that her mother had given her the pill. Following an arbitration meeting with the US Anti-Doping Agency, the panel accepted her version of events and she received a reduced ban of four months.

Cosby tested positive for a prohibited substance and accepted a six-year suspension for her second anti-doping rule violation in March 2017. She tested positive for the presence of an exogenous anabolic-androgenic steroid (AAS) and/or its metabolites, which was confirmed by carbon isotope-ratio mass spectrometry (GC/C/IRMS) analysis, as a result of an out-of-competition urine sample she provided on September 12, 2016.

Cosby was runner-up at the 2010 USA Outdoor Championship, but won the national title in the hammer the following year. She reached the final at the 2011 World Championships in Athletics and placed eleventh overall. She set a new personal record at the 2012 Prefontaine Classic, throwing the implement 74.19 m for fourth place. She competed at the 2012 Olympic Games but again did not qualify for the final. She threw 71.72 meters to place 2nd at the 2014 US Outdoor championship on June 28.

== International competitions ==
| Year | Competition | Venue | Position | Event | Notes |
Representing the United States
| 2000 | World Junior Championships | Santiago, Chile | 9th | Shot put | 14.93 m |
| 2004 | NACAC U23 Championships | Sherbrooke, Canada | 2nd | Hammer | 63.70 m |
| 2007 | NACAC Championships | San Salvador, El Salvador | 1st | Hammer | 65.15 m |
| 2007 | World Championships | Osaka, Japan | 15th (q) | Hammer | 67.90 m |
| 2008 | Olympic Games | Beijing, China | — | Hammer | NM |
| 2009 | World Championships | Berlin, Germany | 7th | Hammer | 72.17 m |
| 2011 | World Championships | Daegu, South Korea | 11th | Hammer | 68.91 m |
| 2012 | Olympic Games | London, United Kingdom | 14th | Hammer | 69.65 m |
