= Brian Blutreich =

American discus thrower

Personal information
- Nationality: American
- Born: January 5, 1967 (age 59) Mission Viejo, California, United States

Sport
- Sport: Athletics
- Event: Discus throw

Brian William Blutreich (born January 5, 1967) is an American athlete. He competed in the men's discus throw at the 1992 Summer Olympics.

Blutreich was an All-American thrower for the UCLA Bruins track and field team. He finished 3rd in the shot put at the 1989 indoor, 1989 outdoor, and 1990 NCAA Division I Indoor Track and Field Championships. He also finished 3rd in the discus at the 1988 NCAA Division I Outdoor Track and Field Championships and 1990 NCAA Division I Outdoor Track and Field Championships.
