= Winston C. Doby =

American academic (1940–2011)

Winston Churchill Doby
- Born: February 20, 1940 Shiloh, Alabama
- Died: November 10, 2011 (aged 71) Santa Monica, California
- Occupations: University administrator, educator
- Known for: Longest-serving Vice Chancellor of Student Affairs at UCLA; founding the Academic Advancement Program (AAP)
- Title: Vice Chancellor of Student Affairs, UCLA; Vice President of Student Affairs, University of California system
- Children: 2

Academic background
- Education: University of California, Los Angeles

Academic work
- Discipline: Higher education administration
- Institutions: University of California, Los Angeles; University of California system

Winston Churchill Doby (February 20, 1940 – November 10, 2011) was one of UCLA's vice chancellors. He was vice chancellor of student affairs for 20 years, making him the longest-serving vice chancellor in UCLA history, and then served as the vice president of student affairs for the UC system.

== Early life ==
Doby was raised by his father Albert and mother Laura. In the 1950s, he was a track and field city champion from John C. Fremont High School with plans to attend Compton College. However, his track coach and UCLA alumni Bill Thayer tried to convince him to attend UCLA instead. Thayer drove him to UCLA during his last week of high school, urging the coaches to award him a scholarship on the condition that Doby come back and teach for 3 years.

Doby was an All-American jumper for the UCLA Bruins track and field team, finishing 5th in the triple jump at the 1961 NCAA track and field championships.

He received three degrees from UCLA: a bachelor's in mathematics, a master's in education, and a doctorate in higher education administration. He was the driving force behind building the Arthur Ashe Student Health and Wellness Center, the Tom Bradley International Hall, and the renovation of the John Wooden Center.

As an administrator, Doby became one of the highest-ranking African Americans in the University of California system.

== Teaching ==
After graduating from UCLA with a degree in mathematics, Doby fulfilled a commitment to his high school mentor by returning to his alma mater, Fremont High School in Los Angeles, as a mathematics teacher. In 1968, Doby returned to UCLA to pursue graduate studies. After a one-year stint as Assistant Track Coach, he joined the administration full-time and held a variety of positions while completing work on his master's degree in education, with a focus on measurement and statistics, and his doctorate in higher education administration at UCLA.

== Lasting Legacy ==
He rose through UCLA's ranks to become vice chancellor of student affairs, heading an organization responsible for providing programs and services to 36,000 students — encompassing such units as undergraduate admissions, financial aid, the registrar's office, dean of students, residential life, health services and outreach. He led campaigns to build the Arthur Ashe Student Health and Wellness Center, the Tom Bradley International Hall and to renovate the Wooden Center and the Men's Gym. Over the years, Doby chaired numerous task groups including one charged with developing a plan for addressing the impacts of Proposition 209. He served as co-chair of the UCLA outreach steering committee in addition to leading system wide task forces focused on the delivery of student services in the next decade and on enhancing the synergy between UC admissions and outreach policies.

Doby was also an active "UCLA ambassador" in the larger community, particularly in the area of K-12 education. For more than a decade, he served as an external member of the Los Angeles Unified School District's Evaluation Planning Team, with a special focus on issues of student achievement, school desegregation, busing, and overcrowding. He also conducted multiple interviews at 12 elementary schools in LAUSD as part of a comprehensive evaluation of its Ten Schools Program.

In 1971 Doby started the Academic Advancement Program (AAP) that is now used all over the country. The primary focus was and is to widen college access for students from historically underrepresented backgrounds.

Doby co-founded the community-based Young Black Scholars Program, which has helped to prepare thousands of young students for college in its 14-year history. In the early '90s, he founded the Black Male Achievement Project at Ralph Bunche Elementary School and launched the Los Angeles Sports Academy, designed to promote academic achievement through sport. He also founded a charter school for high school dropouts and was a key contributor to a middle school pilot program developed to improve mathematics competency. Dr. Doby worked tirelessly to help young people attend college; he was instrumental in establishing the UCLA/Black Alumni Association's "Ella Fitzgerald Memorial Scholarship".

"No written word or spoken plea can teach the children what they should be, nor all the books on all the shelves, it's what the teachers are themselves," former coach John Wooden said, applying one of his famous quotations to Doby's success as an educator.

== Family ==
He has two children, Monica and Chris, and an ex-wife Althea. His daughter, Monica, was a Grammy nominated R&B singer in the group Brownstone and is now a teacher like her father. His son Christopher owns an award-winning social media company.
