= UCLA Bruins track and field =

College track and field team

- University: University of California, Los Angeles
- Head coach: Joanna Hayes
- Conference: Big Ten
- Location: Los Angeles, California
- Outdoor track: Drake Stadium
- Nickname: Bruins
- Colors: Blue and gold

NCAA Indoor National Championships
- Women: 2000, 2001

NCAA Outdoor National Championships
- Men: 1956, 1966, 1971, 1972, 1973, T-1978, 1987, 1988; Women: 1975 (AIAW), 1977 (AIAW), 1982, 1983, 2004

The UCLA Bruins track and field team is the track and field program that represents University of California, Los Angeles. The Bruins compete in NCAA Division I as a member of the Big Ten Conference. The team is based in Los Angeles, at the Drake Stadium.

The program is coached by Joanna Hayes. The track and field program officially encompasses four teams because the NCAA considers men's and women's indoor track and field and outdoor track and field as separate sports.

The teams have won fifteen national titles since their first in 1956. At the 1987 NCAA Division I Outdoor Track and Field Championships, UCLA set the record for the highest ever winning margin, scoring 81 points compared to 28 points for second place. Jackie Robinson won the 1940 NCAA track and field championships title in the long jump for the Bruins before his baseball career. In 2020, UCLA track coach Avery Anderson shared a letter with the team on racial injustice that was subsequently published.

== Postseason ==
=== AIAW ===
The Bruins have had 24 AIAW individual All-Americans finishing in the top six at the AIAW indoor or outdoor championships.

AIAW All-Americans
Championships	Name	Event	Place
1974 Outdoor	Francie Larrieu	880 yards	1st
1974 Outdoor	Julie Brown	880 yards	3rd
1974 Outdoor	Francie Larrieu	Mile run	1st
1974 Outdoor	Julie Brown	Mile run	2nd
1974 Outdoor	Clare Choate	Mile run	5th
1974 Outdoor	Francie Larrieu	2 miles	1st
1974 Outdoor	Julie Brown	2 miles	2nd
1974 Outdoor	Clare Choate	2 miles	3rd
1974 Outdoor	Francie Larrieu	4 × 440 yards relay	2nd
1974 Outdoor	Julie Brown	4 × 440 yards relay	2nd
1974 Outdoor	Dale Raymond	4 × 440 yards relay	2nd
1974 Outdoor	Laurie Huggard	4 × 440 yards relay	2nd
1975 Outdoor	Debbie Roberson	440 yards	4th
1975 Outdoor	Julie Brown	880 yards	2nd
1975 Outdoor	Kate Keyes	880 yards	6th
1975 Outdoor	Julie Brown	Mile run	1st
1975 Outdoor	Kate Keyes	Mile run	2nd
1975 Outdoor	Julie Brown	2 miles	1st
1975 Outdoor	Kate Keyes	2 miles	3rd
1975 Outdoor	Clydine Crowder	100 meters hurdles	5th
1975 Outdoor	Clydine Crowder	400 meters hurdles	4th
1975 Outdoor	Debbie Roberson	4 × 100 meters relay	3rd
1975 Outdoor	Chris A'Harrah	4 × 100 meters relay	3rd
1975 Outdoor	Laurie Huggard	4 × 100 meters relay	3rd
1975 Outdoor	Gayle Butler	4 × 100 meters relay	3rd
1975 Outdoor	Gayle Butler	Sprint medley relay	1st
1975 Outdoor	Laurie Huggard	Sprint medley relay	1st
1975 Outdoor	Sharon White	Sprint medley relay	1st
1975 Outdoor	Chris A'Harrah	Sprint medley relay	1st
1975 Outdoor	Monette Driscoll	Discus throw	1st
1975 Outdoor	Kathy Schmidt	Javelin throw	1st
1976 Outdoor	Evelyn Ashford	100 meters	1st
1976 Outdoor	Lisa Vogelsang	Discus throw	6th
1976 Outdoor	Karin Smith	Javelin throw	1st
1977 Outdoor	Evelyn Ashford	100 meters	1st
1977 Outdoor	Evelyn Ashford	200 meters	1st
1977 Outdoor	Kathy Weston	400 meters	3rd
1977 Outdoor	Debbie Roberson	800 meters	5th
1977 Outdoor	Kate Keyes	1500 meters	5th
1977 Outdoor	Modupe Oshikoya	100 meters hurdles	2nd
1977 Outdoor	Evelyn Ashford	4 × 440 yards relay	2nd
1977 Outdoor	Modupe Oshikoya	4 × 440 yards relay	2nd
1977 Outdoor	Veronica Venezia	4 × 440 yards relay	2nd
1977 Outdoor	Kathy Weston	4 × 440 yards relay	2nd
1977 Outdoor	Kathy Chisam	4 × 880 yards relay	1st
1977 Outdoor	Kate Keyes	4 × 880 yards relay	1st
1977 Outdoor	Debbie Roberson	4 × 880 yards relay	1st
1977 Outdoor	Kathy Weston	4 × 880 yards relay	1st
1977 Outdoor	Evelyn Ashford	Sprint medley relay	1st
1977 Outdoor	Modupe Oshikoya	Sprint medley relay	1st
1977 Outdoor	Debbie Roberson	Sprint medley relay	1st
1977 Outdoor	Kathy Weston	Sprint medley relay	1st
1977 Outdoor	Chris Rammling	High jump	4th
1977 Outdoor	Modupe Oshikoya	Long jump	3rd
1977 Outdoor	Karin Smith	Javelin throw	1st
1978 Outdoor	Evelyn Ashford	100 meters	2nd
1978 Outdoor	Evelyn Ashford	200 meters	1st
1978 Outdoor	Modupe Oshikoya	100 meters hurdles	2nd
1978 Outdoor	Unknown	4 × 800 meters relay	4th
1978 Outdoor	Unknown	4 × 800 meters relay	4th
1978 Outdoor	Unknown	4 × 800 meters relay	4th
1978 Outdoor	Unknown	4 × 800 meters relay	4th
1978 Outdoor	Evelyn Ashford	Sprint medley relay	3rd
1978 Outdoor	Unknown	Sprint medley relay	3rd
1978 Outdoor	Unknown	Sprint medley relay	3rd
1978 Outdoor	Debbie Roberson	Sprint medley relay	3rd
1978 Outdoor	Modupe Oshikoya	Long jump	1st
1979 Outdoor	Kathy Chisam	4 × 880 yards relay	5th
1979 Outdoor	Andrea Ward	4 × 880 yards relay	5th
1979 Outdoor	Sheila Ralston	4 × 880 yards relay	5th
1979 Outdoor	Cynthia Warner	4 × 880 yards relay	5th
1979 Outdoor	Unknown	Sprint medley relay	5th
1979 Outdoor	Unknown	Sprint medley relay	5th
1979 Outdoor	Unknown	Sprint medley relay	5th
1979 Outdoor	Unknown	Sprint medley relay	5th
1980 Outdoor	Cynthia Warner	800 meters	1st
1980 Outdoor	Linda Goen	1500 meters	2nd
1980 Outdoor	Arlise Emerson	4 × 440 yards relay	2nd
1980 Outdoor	Kim Law	4 × 440 yards relay	2nd
1980 Outdoor	Cindy Cumbess	4 × 440 yards relay	2nd
1980 Outdoor	Oralee Fowler	4 × 440 yards relay	2nd
1980 Outdoor	Andrea Ward	4 × 880 yards relay	2nd
1980 Outdoor	Sheila Ralston	4 × 880 yards relay	2nd
1980 Outdoor	Cynthia Warner	4 × 880 yards relay	2nd
1980 Outdoor	Linda Goen	4 × 880 yards relay	2nd
1981 Outdoor	Jeanette Bolden	100 meters	3rd
1981 Outdoor	Florence Griffith	200 meters	2nd
1981 Outdoor	Arlise Emerson	400 meters	3rd
1981 Outdoor	Linda Goen	1500 meters	4th
1981 Outdoor	Sheila Ralston	1500 meters	6th
1981 Outdoor	Jeanette Bolden	4 × 100 meters relay	2nd
1981 Outdoor	Sherri Howard	4 × 100 meters relay	2nd
1981 Outdoor	Florence Griffith	4 × 100 meters relay	2nd
1981 Outdoor	Missy Jerald	4 × 100 meters relay	2nd
1981 Outdoor	Cindy Cumbess	4 × 400 meters relay	2nd
1981 Outdoor	Sherri Howard	4 × 400 meters relay	2nd
1981 Outdoor	Arlise Emerson	4 × 400 meters relay	2nd
1981 Outdoor	Oralee Fowler	4 × 400 meters relay	2nd
1981 Outdoor	Missy Jerald	Sprint medley relay	2nd
1981 Outdoor	Jeanette Bolden	Sprint medley relay	2nd
1981 Outdoor	Florence Griffith	Sprint medley relay	2nd
1981 Outdoor	Sherri Howard	Sprint medley relay	2nd
1981 Outdoor	Jacque Nelson	Javelin throw	5th
1981 Outdoor	Jackie Joyner	Heptathlon	3rd

=== NCAA ===
As of April 2025, a total of 212 men and 84 women have achieved individual first-team All-American status at the Division I men's outdoor, women's outdoor, men's indoor, or women's indoor national championships (using the modern criteria of top-8 placing regardless of athlete nationality).

First team NCAA All-Americans
Team	Championships	Name	Event	Place	Ref.
Men's	1934 Outdoor	Jimmy Luvalle	400 meters	7th	
Men's	1934 Outdoor	Jimmy Miller	800 meters	2nd	
Men's	1934 Outdoor	Scott Massey	Pole vault	3rd	
Men's	1934 Outdoor	Bill Reitz	Javelin throw	6th	
Men's	1935 Outdoor	Jimmy Luvalle	400 meters	1st	
Men's	1935 Outdoor	Scott Massey	Pole vault	6th	
Men's	1937 Outdoor	Tom Berkeley	220 yards hurdles	5th	
Men's	1937 Outdoor	Bill Reitz	Javelin throw	2nd	
Men's	1938 Outdoor	Bill Lacefield	Long jump	1st	
Men's	1938 Outdoor	Woody Strode	Shot put	4th	
Men's	1938 Outdoor	Clark Shaughnessy Jr.	Javelin throw	6th	
Men's	1939 Outdoor	Pat Turner	Long jump	3rd	
Men's	1940 Outdoor	Hal Sinclair	200 meters	6th	
Men's	1940 Outdoor	Jackie Robinson	Long jump	1st	
Men's	1940 Outdoor	Pat Turner	Long jump	4th	
Men's	1940 Outdoor	Bill Lacefield	Long jump	5th	
Men's	1941 Outdoor	Hal Sinclair	100 meters	6th	
Men's	1941 Outdoor	Hal Sinclair	200 meters	5th	
Men's	1941 Outdoor	Paul Shoaff	High jump	4th	
Men's	1941 Outdoor	Roger Hoeger	Shot put	6th	
Men's	1942 Outdoor	Ray Maggard	Pole vault	2nd	
Men's	1946 Outdoor	Craig Dixon	220 yards hurdles	5th	
Men's	1946 Outdoor	Ralph Gold	800 meters	5th	
Men's	1946 Outdoor	John Pattee	3000 meters	6th	
Men's	1947 Outdoor	Craig Dixon	220 yards hurdles	6th	
Men's	1947 Outdoor	Ray Maggard	Pole vault	1st	
Men's	1947 Outdoor	Jerry Shipkey	Shot put	5th	
Men's	1948 Outdoor	Craig Dixon	110 meters hurdles	3rd	
Men's	1949 Outdoor	Craig Dixon	220 yards hurdles	1st	
Men's	1949 Outdoor	Bob Work	100 meters	3rd	
Men's	1949 Outdoor	Craig Dixon	110 meters hurdles	1st	
Men's	1949 Outdoor	George Stanich	High jump	4th	
Men's	1949 Outdoor	Taylor Lewis	Discus throw	4th	
Men's	1949 Outdoor	Cy Young	Javelin throw	7th	
Men's	1950 Outdoor	Cy Young	Javelin throw	2nd	
Men's	1951 Outdoor	Bob Work	100 meters	3rd	
Men's	1951 Outdoor	George Brown	200 meters	5th	
Men's	1951 Outdoor	Don Hangen	800 meters	7th	
Men's	1951 Outdoor	Hugh Mitchell	800 meters	8th	
Men's	1951 Outdoor	George Brown	Long jump	1st	
Men's	1952 Outdoor	Rod Richard	200 meters	5th	
Men's	1952 Outdoor	George Brown	200 meters	6th	
Men's	1952 Outdoor	Jack Sage	400 meters hurdles	6th	
Men's	1952 Outdoor	Chuck Phillips	3000 meters steeplechase	2nd	
Men's	1952 Outdoor	Larry Carter	10,000 meters	5th	
Men's	1952 Outdoor	Len Eilers	Pole vault	6th	
Men's	1952 Outdoor	George Brown	Long jump	1st	
Men's	1953 Outdoor	Rod Richard	100 meters	4th	
Men's	1953 Outdoor	Rod Richard	200 meters	2nd	
Men's	1953 Outdoor	Larry Carter	3000 meters	8th	
Men's	1953 Outdoor	Len Eilers	Pole vault	5th	
Men's	1953 Outdoor	Clyde Wetter	Shot put	8th	
Men's	1955 Outdoor	Chuck Holloway	220 yards hurdles	6th	
Men's	1955 Outdoor	Russ Ellis	400 meters	3rd	
Men's	1955 Outdoor	Bob Seaman	Mile run	3rd	
Men's	1955 Outdoor	Bob Hunt	3000 meters	4th	
Men's	1955 Outdoor	Lindy Kell	Pole vault	6th	
Men's	1955 Outdoor	Mel Hill	Pole vault	6th	
Men's	1955 Outdoor	Jon Mitchell	Pole vault	8th	
Men's	1955 Outdoor	Dave Vick	Shot put	3rd	
Men's	1955 Outdoor	Billy Joe Wright	Shot put	7th	
Men's	1955 Outdoor	Clyde Wetter	Shot put	8th	
Men's	1955 Outdoor	Ron Drummond	Discus throw	2nd	
Men's	1955 Outdoor	Don Vick	Discus throw	5th	
Men's	1956 Outdoor	Rafer Johnson	110 meters hurdles	2nd	
Men's	1956 Outdoor	Russ Ellis	400 meters	4th	
Men's	1956 Outdoor	Bob Seaman	1500 meters	4th	
Men's	1956 Outdoor	Dick Rodriguez	3000 meters steeplechase	8th	
Men's	1956 Outdoor	Nick Dyer	High jump	1st	
Men's	1956 Outdoor	Hal Miller	High jump	4th	
Men's	1956 Outdoor	Jon Mitchell	Pole vault	7th	
Men's	1956 Outdoor	Rafer Johnson	Long jump	2nd	
Men's	1956 Outdoor	Dick Knaub	Long jump	6th	
Men's	1956 Outdoor	Dave Vick	Shot put	4th	
Men's	1956 Outdoor	Ron Drummond	Discus throw	1st	
Men's	1956 Outdoor	Don Vick	Discus throw	2nd	
Men's	1960 Outdoor	Jimmy Johnson	110 meters hurdles	1st	
Men's	1960 Outdoor	Bob Holland	1500 meters	2nd	
Men's	1960 Outdoor	Mil Dahl	1500 meters	3rd	
Men's	1960 Outdoor	Negalingam Ethirveerasingam	High jump	7th	
Men's	1960 Outdoor	Winston Doby	Triple jump	7th	
Men's	1960 Outdoor	Clark Branson	Shot put	5th	
Men's	1960 Outdoor	Jack Putnam	Discus throw	6th	
Men's	1960 Outdoor	Ron Ulrich	Javelin throw	4th	
Men's	1961 Outdoor	Mil Dahl	Mile run	4th	
Men's	1961 Outdoor	Winston Doby	Triple jump	5th	
Men's	1961 Outdoor	Clark Branson	Shot put	3rd	
Men's	1961 Outdoor	Jack Putnam	Discus throw	6th	
Men's	1961 Outdoor	C.K. Yang	Javelin throw	8th	
Men's	1962 Outdoor	Mil Dahl	Mile run	6th	
Men's	1962 Outdoor	Winston Doby	Long jump	8th	
Men's	1962 Outdoor	Kermit Alexander	Triple jump	1st	
Men's	1962 Outdoor	C.K. Yang	Javelin throw	8th	
Men's	1963 Outdoor	C.K. Yang	110 meters hurdles	5th	
Men's	1964 Outdoor	Bob Day	1500 meters	6th	
Men's	1964 Outdoor	Dick Weeks	10,000 meters	6th	
Men's	1965 Outdoor	Len Dodson	200 meters	4th	
Men's	1965 Outdoor	Bob Day	Mile run	1st	
Men's	1965 Outdoor	Earl Clibborn	3000 meters steeplechase	3rd	
Men's	1966 Outdoor	Norm Jackson	100 meters	6th	
Men's	1966 Outdoor	Ron Copeland	110 meters hurdles	1st	
Men's	1966 Outdoor	Tom Jones	200 meters	1st	
Men's	1966 Outdoor	Norm Jackson	200 meters	4th	
Men's	1966 Outdoor	Roger Johnson	400 meters hurdles	2nd	
Men's	1966 Outdoor	Geoff Pyne	5000 meters	4th	
Men's	1966 Outdoor	Geoff Pyne	10,000 meters	2nd	
Men's	1966 Outdoor	Dick Weeks	10,000 meters	8th	
Men's	1966 Outdoor	Tom Jones	4 × 100 meters relay	1st	
Men's	1966 Outdoor	Bob Frey	4 × 100 meters relay	1st	
Men's	1966 Outdoor	Ron Copeland	4 × 100 meters relay	1st	
Men's	1966 Outdoor	Norm Jackson	4 × 100 meters relay	1st	
Men's	1966 Outdoor	Gene Gall	4 × 400 meters relay	1st	
Men's	1966 Outdoor	Don Domansky	4 × 400 meters relay	1st	
Men's	1966 Outdoor	Ron Copeland	4 × 400 meters relay	1st	
Men's	1966 Outdoor	Bob Frey	4 × 400 meters relay	1st	
Men's	1966 Outdoor	Marc Savage	Pole vault	2nd	
Men's	1966 Outdoor	Doug Olmstead	Triple jump	5th	
Men's	1966 Outdoor	Dave Weber	Discus throw	8th	
Men's	1966 Outdoor	Dick Selby	Javelin throw	3rd	
Men's	1967 Outdoor	Ron Copeland	110 meters hurdles	4th	
Men's	1967 Outdoor	Don Domansky	400 meters	5th	
Men's	1967 Outdoor	Roger Johnson	400 meters hurdles	7th	
Men's	1967 Outdoor	Paul Hoyt	4 × 400 meters relay	5th	
Men's	1967 Outdoor	Don Domansky	4 × 400 meters relay	5th	
Men's	1967 Outdoor	Les Fendia	4 × 400 meters relay	5th	
Men's	1967 Outdoor	Ron Copeland	4 × 400 meters relay	5th	
Men's	1967 Outdoor	Rick Sloan	High jump	6th	
Men's	1967 Outdoor	Dick Railsback	Pole vault	3rd	
Men's	1967 Outdoor	Rick Sloan	Pole vault	4th	
Men's	1967 Outdoor	Gerald Lee	Triple jump	5th	
Men's	1967 Outdoor	Doug Ford	Triple jump	6th	
Men's	1967 Outdoor	Steve Marcus	Shot put	4th	
Men's	1967 Outdoor	Kirk Wassel	Discus throw	6th	
Men's	1968 Outdoor	Jon Vaughn	Pole vault	1st	
Men's	1968 Outdoor	John Johnson	Long jump	2nd	
Men's	1968 Outdoor	Doug Ford	Triple jump	5th	
Men's	1968 Outdoor	Steve Marcus	Shot put	1st	
Men's	1968 Outdoor	Russ Hodge	Shot put	7th	
Men's	1969 Outdoor	Reggie Robinson	100 meters	6th	
Men's	1969 Outdoor	Wayne Collett	200 meters	4th	
Men's	1969 Outdoor	Len van Hofwegen	400 meters	8th	
Men's	1969 Outdoor	John Smith	4 × 400 meters relay	1st	
Men's	1969 Outdoor	Len Van Hofwegen	4 × 400 meters relay	1st	
Men's	1969 Outdoor	Andy Young	4 × 400 meters relay	1st	
Men's	1969 Outdoor	Wayne Collett	4 × 400 meters relay	1st	
Men's	1969 Outdoor	Jon Vaughn	Pole vault	2nd	
Men's	1969 Outdoor	John Johnson	Long jump	5th	
Men's	1969 Outdoor	Denny Rogers	Triple jump	4th	
Men's	1969 Outdoor	Mark Ostoich	Shot put	3rd	
Men's	1969 Outdoor	Steve Marcus	Shot put	4th	
Men's	1970 Outdoor	John Smith	400 meters	4th	
Men's	1970 Outdoor	Wayne Collette	400 meters hurdles	2nd	
Men's	1970 Outdoor	Bob Langston	4 × 400 meters relay	1st	
Men's	1970 Outdoor	John Smith	4 × 400 meters relay	1st	
Men's	1970 Outdoor	Brad Lyman	4 × 400 meters relay	1st	
Men's	1970 Outdoor	Wayne Collett	4 × 400 meters relay	1st	
Men's	1970 Outdoor	Jeff Sakala	Pole vault	4th	
Men's	1970 Outdoor	John Johnson	Long jump	8th	
Men's	1970 Outdoor	Mark Ostoich	Shot put	5th	
Men's	1971 Outdoor	Warren Edmonson	100 meters	5th	
Men's	1971 Outdoor	John Smith	400 meters	1st	
Men's	1971 Outdoor	Wayne Collett	400 meters	4th	
Men's	1971 Outdoor	Warren Edmonson	4 × 400 meters relay	1st	
Men's	1971 Outdoor	Reggie Echols	4 × 400 meters relay	1st	
Men's	1971 Outdoor	John Smith	4 × 400 meters relay	1st	
Men's	1971 Outdoor	Wayne Collett	4 × 400 meters relay	1st	
Men's	1971 Outdoor	Francois Tracanelli	Pole vault	2nd	
Men's	1971 Outdoor	Finn Bendixen	Long jump	3rd	
Men's	1971 Outdoor	Denny Rogers	Triple jump	3rd	
Men's	1971 Outdoor	James Butts	Triple jump	4th	
Men's	1971 Outdoor	Marc Ostoich	Discus throw	5th	
Men's	1971 Outdoor	Roger Freberg	Discus throw	8th	
Men's	1972 Outdoor	Warren Edmonson	100 meters	1st	
Men's	1972 Outdoor	Charles Rich	110 meters hurdles	3rd	
Men's	1972 Outdoor	John Smith	400 meters	1st	
Men's	1972 Outdoor	Benny Brown	400 meters	3rd	
Men's	1972 Outdoor	Jean-Pierre Corval	400 meters hurdles	3rd	
Men's	1972 Outdoor	Reggie Echols	4 × 400 meters relay	1st	
Men's	1972 Outdoor	Ron Gaddis	4 × 400 meters relay	1st	
Men's	1972 Outdoor	Benny Brown	4 × 400 meters relay	1st	
Men's	1972 Outdoor	John Smith	4 × 400 meters relay	1st	
Men's	1972 Outdoor	Dwight Stones	High jump	3rd	
Men's	1972 Outdoor	Rick Fletcher	High jump	7th	
Men's	1972 Outdoor	Finn Bendixen	Long jump	4th	
Men's	1972 Outdoor	James Butts	Triple jump	1st	
Men's	1972 Outdoor	Harry Freeman	Triple jump	3rd	
Men's	1972 Outdoor	Milan Tiff	Triple jump	4th	
Men's	1972 Outdoor	Dale Gordon	Discus throw	5th	
Men's	1972 Outdoor	Rory Kotinek	Decathlon	5th	
Men's	1973 Outdoor	Charles Rich	110 meters hurdles	4th	
Men's	1973 Outdoor	Clim Jackson	110 meters hurdles	7th	
Men's	1973 Outdoor	Benny Brown	400 meters	2nd	
Men's	1973 Outdoor	Maxie Parks	400 meters	5th	
Men's	1973 Outdoor	Ron Gaddis	4 × 400 meters relay	1st	
Men's	1973 Outdoor	Gordon Peppars	4 × 400 meters relay	1st	
Men's	1973 Outdoor	Maxie Parks	4 × 400 meters relay	1st	
Men's	1973 Outdoor	Benny Brown	4 × 400 meters relay	1st	
Men's	1973 Outdoor	Rory Kotinek	High jump	4th	
Men's	1973 Outdoor	Finn Bendixen	Long jump	1st	
Men's	1973 Outdoor	James McAlister	Long jump	3rd	
Men's	1973 Outdoor	Milan Tiff	Triple jump	1st	
Men's	1973 Outdoor	Dale Gordon	Discus throw	5th	
Men's	1973 Outdoor	Roger Freberg	Discus throw	7th	
Men's	1974 Outdoor	Maxie Parks	400 meters	3rd	
Men's	1974 Outdoor	Benny Brown	400 meters	8th	
Men's	1974 Outdoor	Gordon Innes	3000 meters steeplechase	4th	
Men's	1974 Outdoor	Lynnsey Guerrero	4 × 400 meters relay	1st	
Men's	1974 Outdoor	Benny Brown	4 × 400 meters relay	1st	
Men's	1974 Outdoor	Jerome Walters	4 × 400 meters relay	1st	
Men's	1974 Outdoor	Maxie Parks	4 × 400 meters relay	1st	
Men's	1974 Outdoor	Rory Kotineck	High jump	3rd	
Men's	1974 Outdoor	Francois Tracanelli	Pole vault	3rd	
Men's	1974 Outdoor	Ron Mooers	Pole vault	4th	
Men's	1974 Outdoor	Jerry Herndon	Long jump	1st	
Men's	1974 Outdoor	Clarence Taylor	Triple jump	5th	
Men's	1974 Outdoor	Dave Schiller	Shot put	7th	
Men's	1974 Outdoor	Roger Freberg	Discus throw	2nd	
Men's	1975 Outdoor	James Owens	110 meters hurdles	2nd	
Men's	1975 Outdoor	Clim Jackson	110 meters hurdles	5th	
Men's	1975 Outdoor	Benny Brown	400 meters	1st	
Men's	1975 Outdoor	James Owens	4 × 100 meters relay	6th	
Men's	1975 Outdoor	Rick Wilmoth	4 × 100 meters relay	6th	
Men's	1975 Outdoor	Dotson Wilson	4 × 100 meters relay	6th	
Men's	1975 Outdoor	Benny Brown	4 × 100 meters relay	6th	
Men's	1975 Outdoor	Rory Kotinek	High jump	2nd	
Men's	1975 Outdoor	Ron Mooers	Pole vault	3rd	
Men's	1975 Outdoor	Willie Banks	Long jump	5th	
Men's	1975 Outdoor	Clarence Taylor	Triple jump	3rd	
Men's	1975 Outdoor	Rich Gunther	Discus throw	7th	
Men's	1976 Outdoor	James Owens	110 meters hurdles	2nd	
Men's	1976 Outdoor	Phil Mills	400 meters hurdles	7th	
Men's	1976 Outdoor	Mike Tully	Pole vault	4th	
Men's	1976 Outdoor	Willie Banks	Triple jump	4th	
Men's	1977 Outdoor	James Owens	110 meters hurdles	1st	
Men's	1977 Outdoor	Greg Foster	110 meters hurdles	3rd	
Men's	1977 Outdoor	James Owens	4 × 100 meters relay	6th	
Men's	1977 Outdoor	Benny Myles	4 × 100 meters relay	6th	
Men's	1977 Outdoor	Jim Schaeffer	4 × 100 meters relay	6th	
Men's	1977 Outdoor	Greg Foster	4 × 100 meters relay	6th	
Men's	1977 Outdoor	Grant Niederhaus	4 × 400 meters relay	5th	
Men's	1977 Outdoor	Jeff Leeds	4 × 400 meters relay	5th	
Men's	1977 Outdoor	Donn Thompson	4 × 400 meters relay	5th	
Men's	1977 Outdoor	Benny Myles	4 × 400 meters relay	5th	
Men's	1977 Outdoor	Mike Tully	Pole vault	2nd	
Men's	1977 Outdoor	Willie Banks	Triple jump	2nd	
Men's	1978 Indoor	Mike Tully	Pole vault	1st	
Men's	1978 Indoor	Charles Brown	Pole vault	3rd	
Men's	1978 Outdoor	Greg Foster	110 meters hurdles	1st	
Men's	1978 Outdoor	James Owens	110 meters hurdles	3rd	
Men's	1978 Outdoor	Dwayne Joseph	High jump	5th	
Men's	1978 Outdoor	Mike Tully	Pole vault	1st	
Men's	1978 Outdoor	Charles Brown	Pole vault	4th	
Men's	1978 Outdoor	Willie Banks	Triple jump	2nd	
Men's	1978 Outdoor	Dave Laut	Shot put	1st	
Men's	1979 Outdoor	Eric Brown	100 meters	7th	
Men's	1979 Outdoor	Greg Foster	200 meters	1st	
Men's	1979 Outdoor	Jon Warner	Pole vault	3rd	
Men's	1979 Outdoor	Anthony Curran	Pole vault	4th	
Men's	1979 Outdoor	Dave Laut	Shot put	1st	
Men's	1979 Outdoor	Marc Gordien	Shot put	5th	
Men's	1979 Outdoor	Ted Demill	Javelin throw	4th	
Men's	1980 Outdoor	Eric Brown	100 meters	5th	
Men's	1980 Outdoor	Greg Foster	110 meters hurdles	1st	
Men's	1980 Outdoor	Greg Foster	200 meters	3rd	
Men's	1980 Outdoor	Andre Phillips	400 meters hurdles	7th	
Men's	1980 Outdoor	Steve Ortiz	5000 meters	8th	
Men's	1980 Outdoor	Dokie Williams	4 × 100 meters relay	4th	
Men's	1980 Outdoor	Eric Brown	4 × 100 meters relay	4th	
Men's	1980 Outdoor	Tony Banks	4 × 100 meters relay	4th	
Men's	1980 Outdoor	Greg Foster	4 × 100 meters relay	4th	
Men's	1980 Outdoor	Eric McNeal	4 × 400 meters relay	7th	
Men's	1980 Outdoor	Tony Banks	4 × 400 meters relay	7th	
Men's	1980 Outdoor	Donn Thompson	4 × 400 meters relay	7th	
Men's	1980 Outdoor	Andre Phillips	4 × 400 meters relay	7th	
Men's	1980 Outdoor	Anthony Curran	Pole vault	3rd	
Men's	1980 Outdoor	Dokie Williams	Triple jump	3rd	
Men's	1980 Outdoor	Chip Benson	Triple jump	5th	
Men's	1980 Outdoor	Mark Anderson	Decathlon	1st	
Men's	1981 Outdoor	Eric Brown	100 meters	4th	
Men's	1981 Outdoor	Andre Phillips	400 meters hurdles	1st	
Men's	1981 Outdoor	Anthony Curran	Pole vault	2nd	
Men's	1981 Outdoor	Kris Lettow	Discus throw	8th	
Men's	1981 Outdoor	Mark Anderson	Decathlon	2nd	
Men's	1982 Outdoor	Marcus Allen	110 meters hurdles	7th	
Men's	1982 Outdoor	Eric Brown	200 meters	4th	
Men's	1982 Outdoor	Dave Daniels	3000 meters steeplechase	3rd	
Men's	1982 Outdoor	Steve McCormack	5000 meters	8th	
Men's	1982 Outdoor	Steve Ortiz	10,000 meters	6th	
Men's	1982 Outdoor	Del Davis	High jump	2nd	
Men's	1982 Outdoor	Anthony Curran	Pole vault	4th	
Men's	1982 Outdoor	Chip Benson	Triple jump	5th	
Women's	1982 Outdoor	Jeanette Bolden	100 meters	2nd	
Women's	1982 Outdoor	Florence Griffith	100 meters	5th	
Women's	1982 Outdoor	La Shonn Nedd	100 meters	8th	
Women's	1982 Outdoor	Florence Griffith	200 meters	1st	
Women's	1982 Outdoor	La Shonn Nedd	200 meters	5th	
Women's	1982 Outdoor	La Shonn Nedd	400 meters	4th	
Women's	1982 Outdoor	Arlise Emerson	400 meters	5th	
Women's	1982 Outdoor	Michele Bush	1500 meters	4th	
Women's	1982 Outdoor	Linda Goen	1500 meters	5th	
Women's	1982 Outdoor	Missy Jerold	4 × 100 meters relay	3rd	
Women's	1982 Outdoor	Florence Griffith	4 × 100 meters relay	3rd	
Women's	1982 Outdoor	Jackie Joyner	4 × 100 meters relay	3rd	
Women's	1982 Outdoor	Jeanette Bolden	4 × 100 meters relay	3rd	
Women's	1982 Outdoor	Cindy Cumbess	4 × 400 meters relay	3rd	
Women's	1982 Outdoor	Arlise Emerson	4 × 400 meters relay	3rd	
Women's	1982 Outdoor	Jackie Joyner	4 × 400 meters relay	3rd	
Women's	1982 Outdoor	La Shonn Nedd	4 × 400 meters relay	3rd	
Women's	1982 Outdoor	Jackie Joyner	Long jump	2nd	
Women's	1982 Outdoor	Jacque Nelson	Javelin throw	4th	
Women's	1982 Outdoor	Jackie Joyner	Heptathlon	1st	
Women's	1982 Outdoor	Susie Ray	Heptathlon	4th	
Men's	1983 Outdoor	Steve McCormack	5000 meters	7th	
Men's	1983 Outdoor	John Brenner	Shot put	2nd	
Men's	1983 Outdoor	John Brenner	Discus throw	4th	
Men's	1983 Outdoor	Jim Connolly	Decathlon	7th	
Women's	1983 Outdoor	Jackie Joyner	100 meters hurdles	8th	
Women's	1983 Outdoor	Florence Griffith	200 meters	2nd	
Women's	1983 Outdoor	Florence Griffith	400 meters	1st	
Women's	1983 Outdoor	Michele Bush	1500 meters	1st	
Women's	1983 Outdoor	Missy Jerold	4 × 100 meters relay	5th	
Women's	1983 Outdoor	Jackie Joyner	4 × 100 meters relay	5th	
Women's	1983 Outdoor	La Shon Nedd	4 × 100 meters relay	5th	
Women's	1983 Outdoor	Florence Griffith	4 × 100 meters relay	5th	
Women's	1983 Outdoor	La Shonn Nedd	4 × 400 meters relay	6th	
Women's	1983 Outdoor	Brenda Peterson	4 × 400 meters relay	6th	
Women's	1983 Outdoor	Jackie Joyner	4 × 400 meters relay	6th	
Women's	1983 Outdoor	Arlise Emerson	4 × 400 meters relay	6th	
Women's	1983 Outdoor	Jackie Joyner	Long jump	3rd	
Women's	1983 Outdoor	Susie Ray	Javelin throw	6th	
Women's	1983 Outdoor	Jackie Joyner	Heptathlon	1st	
Women's	1983 Outdoor	Susie Ray	Heptathlon	5th	
Women's	1983 Outdoor	Tonya Alston	Heptathlon	8th	
Men's	1984 Outdoor	Lee Balkin	High jump	5th	
Men's	1984 Outdoor	John Brenner	Shot put	1st	
Men's	1984 Outdoor	John Brenner	Discus throw	1st	
Men's	1984 Outdoor	Jim Connolly	Javelin throw	5th	
Women's	1984 Outdoor	Tonya Alston	High jump	1st	
Men's	1985 Outdoor	John Frazier	Shot put	6th	
Women's	1985 Outdoor	Gail Devers	100 meters	6th	
Women's	1985 Outdoor	Jackie Joyner	100 meters hurdles	3rd	
Women's	1985 Outdoor	Gail Devers	100 meters hurdles	6th	
Women's	1985 Outdoor	Gail Devers	200 meters	6th	
Women's	1985 Outdoor	Jackie Joyner	400 meters hurdles	2nd	
Women's	1985 Outdoor	Angela Bailey	4 × 100 meters relay	4th	
Women's	1985 Outdoor	Jackie Joyner	4 × 100 meters relay	4th	
Women's	1985 Outdoor	Monica Phillips	4 × 100 meters relay	4th	
Women's	1985 Outdoor	Gail Devers	4 × 100 meters relay	4th	
Women's	1985 Outdoor	Gayle Kellon	4 × 400 meters relay	5th	
Women's	1985 Outdoor	Angela Bailey	4 × 400 meters relay	5th	
Women's	1985 Outdoor	Monica Phillips	4 × 400 meters relay	5th	
Women's	1985 Outdoor	Jackie Joyner	4 × 400 meters relay	5th	
Women's	1985 Outdoor	Jackie Joyner	Triple jump	2nd	
Women's	1985 Outdoor	Toni Lutjens	Discus throw	4th	
Men's	1986 Outdoor	Danny Everett	400 meters	5th	
Men's	1986 Outdoor	Kevin Young	400 meters hurdles	2nd	
Men's	1986 Outdoor	Anthony Washington	4 × 400 meters relay	2nd	
Men's	1986 Outdoor	Kevin Young	4 × 400 meters relay	2nd	
Men's	1986 Outdoor	John Stanich	4 × 400 meters relay	2nd	
Men's	1986 Outdoor	Danny Everett	4 × 400 meters relay	2nd	
Men's	1986 Outdoor	Jim Banich	Shot put	6th	
Men's	1986 Outdoor	John Frazier	Shot put	8th	
Men's	1986 Outdoor	Jim Connolly	Decathlon	4th	
Women's	1986 Outdoor	Gail Devers	100 meters	1st	
Women's	1986 Outdoor	Gail Devers	100 meters hurdles	4th	
Women's	1986 Outdoor	Gayle Kellon	400 meters hurdles	7th	
Women's	1986 Outdoor	Gail Devers	Long jump	2nd	
Women's	1986 Outdoor	Toni Lutjens	Discus throw	1st	
Men's	1987 Outdoor	Mike Marsh	100 meters	3rd	
Men's	1987 Outdoor	Steve Kerho	110 meters hurdles	7th	
Men's	1987 Outdoor	Henry Thomas	200 meters	3rd	
Men's	1987 Outdoor	Danny Everett	400 meters	2nd	
Men's	1987 Outdoor	Kevin Young	400 meters hurdles	1st	
Men's	1987 Outdoor	Mark Junkermann	3000 meters steeplechase	2nd	
Men's	1987 Outdoor	Mike Marsh	4 × 100 meters relay	3rd	
Men's	1987 Outdoor	Danny Everett	4 × 100 meters relay	3rd	
Men's	1987 Outdoor	Raymond Young	4 × 100 meters relay	3rd	
Men's	1987 Outdoor	Henry Thomas	4 × 100 meters relay	3rd	
Men's	1987 Outdoor	Anthony Washington	4 × 400 meters relay	1st	
Men's	1987 Outdoor	Kevin Young	4 × 400 meters relay	1st	
Men's	1987 Outdoor	Henry Thomas	4 × 400 meters relay	1st	
Men's	1987 Outdoor	Danny Everett	4 × 400 meters relay	1st	
Men's	1987 Outdoor	Jim Banich	Shot put	2nd	
Men's	1987 Outdoor	Jim Banich	Discus throw	4th	
Men's	1987 Outdoor	David Wilson	Hammer throw	7th	
Men's	1987 Outdoor	Jim Connolly	Decathlon	1st	
Women's	1987 Outdoor	Gail Devers	100 meters	2nd	
Women's	1987 Outdoor	Nicolle Thompson	100 meters hurdles	8th	
Women's	1987 Outdoor	Polly Plumer	3000 meters	7th	
Women's	1987 Outdoor	Nicolle Thompson	4 × 100 meters relay	4th	
Women's	1987 Outdoor	Monica Phillips	4 × 100 meters relay	4th	
Women's	1987 Outdoor	Kiersten Church	4 × 100 meters relay	4th	
Women's	1987 Outdoor	Gail Devers	4 × 100 meters relay	4th	
Women's	1987 Outdoor	Chewuakii Knighten	4 × 400 meters relay	4th	
Women's	1987 Outdoor	Monica Phillips	4 × 400 meters relay	4th	
Women's	1987 Outdoor	Gayle Kellon	4 × 400 meters relay	4th	
Women's	1987 Outdoor	Gail Devers	4 × 400 meters relay	4th	
Women's	1987 Outdoor	Toni Lutjens	Discus throw	3rd	
Men's	1988 Indoor	Mark Junkermann	3000 meters	3rd	
Men's	1988 Outdoor	Mike Marsh	100 meters	4th	
Men's	1988 Outdoor	Henry Thomas	200 meters	3rd	
Men's	1988 Outdoor	Danny Everett	400 meters	1st	
Men's	1988 Outdoor	Steve Lewis	400 meters	2nd	
Men's	1988 Outdoor	Kevin Young	400 meters hurdles	1st	
Men's	1988 Outdoor	Mike Marsh	4 × 100 meters relay	2nd	
Men's	1988 Outdoor	Danny Everett	4 × 100 meters relay	2nd	
Men's	1988 Outdoor	Steve Lewis	4 × 100 meters relay	2nd	
Men's	1988 Outdoor	Henry Thomas	4 × 100 meters relay	2nd	
Men's	1988 Outdoor	Steve Lewis	4 × 400 meters relay	1st	
Men's	1988 Outdoor	Kevin Young	4 × 400 meters relay	1st	
Men's	1988 Outdoor	Danny Everett	4 × 400 meters relay	1st	
Men's	1988 Outdoor	Henry Thomas	4 × 400 meters relay	1st	
Men's	1988 Outdoor	David Wilson	Shot put	7th	
Men's	1988 Outdoor	Pete Thompson	Discus throw	2nd	
Men's	1988 Outdoor	Brian Blutreich	Discus throw	3rd	
Men's	1988 Outdoor	David Wilson	Hammer throw	2nd	
Men's	1988 Outdoor	John Knight	Hammer throw	8th	
Women's	1988 Outdoor	Gail Devers	100 meters	1st	
Women's	1988 Outdoor	Gail Devers	100 meters hurdles	3rd	
Women's	1988 Outdoor	Janeene Vickers	400 meters hurdles	4th	
Women's	1988 Outdoor	Tonya Sedwick	4 × 100 meters relay	2nd	
Women's	1988 Outdoor	Caryl Smith	4 × 100 meters relay	2nd	
Women's	1988 Outdoor	Monica Phillips	4 × 100 meters relay	2nd	
Women's	1988 Outdoor	Gail Devers	4 × 100 meters relay	2nd	
Women's	1988 Outdoor	Monica Phillips	4 × 400 meters relay	1st	
Women's	1988 Outdoor	Gail Devers	4 × 400 meters relay	1st	
Women's	1988 Outdoor	Chewuakii Knighten	4 × 400 meters relay	1st	
Women's	1988 Outdoor	Janeene Vickers	4 × 400 meters relay	1st	
Women's	1988 Outdoor	Gail Devers	Long jump	2nd	
Women's	1988 Outdoor	Tracie Millett	Discus throw	3rd	
Women's	1988 Outdoor	Kris Larson	Discus throw	4th	
Men's	1989 Indoor	Brian Blutreich	Shot put	3rd	
Men's	1989 Indoor	David Wilson	Shot put	6th	
Men's	1989 Indoor	David Wilson	Weight throw	5th	
Men's	1989 Outdoor	Mike Marsh	200 meters	7th	
Men's	1989 Outdoor	David Wilson	Shot put	2nd	
Men's	1989 Outdoor	Brian Blutreich	Shot put	3rd	
Men's	1989 Outdoor	Pete Thompson	Discus throw	3rd	
Men's	1989 Outdoor	Brian Blutreich	Discus throw	4th	
Men's	1989 Outdoor	John Knight	Hammer throw	8th	
Women's	1989 Outdoor	Janeene Vickers	100 meters hurdles	4th	
Women's	1989 Outdoor	Janeene Vickers	400 meters hurdles	1st	
Women's	1989 Outdoor	Julie Johnson	4 × 400 meters relay	2nd	
Women's	1989 Outdoor	Tonya Sedwick	4 × 400 meters relay	2nd	
Women's	1989 Outdoor	Caryl Smith	4 × 400 meters relay	2nd	
Women's	1989 Outdoor	Janeene Vickers	4 × 400 meters relay	2nd	
Women's	1989 Outdoor	Kris Larson	Shot put	5th	
Women's	1989 Outdoor	Kris Larson	Discus throw	2nd	
Women's	1989 Outdoor	Tracie Millett	Discus throw	3rd	
Women's	1989 Outdoor	Tonya Sedwick	Heptathlon	3rd	
Men's	1990 Indoor	Brian Blutreich	Shot put	3rd	
Women's	1990 Indoor	Tracie Millett	Shot put	1st	
Men's	1990 Outdoor	Steve Lewis	400 meters	1st	
Men's	1990 Outdoor	Mike Stevenson	400 meters	8th	
Men's	1990 Outdoor	Eric Bergreen	Shot put	8th	
Men's	1990 Outdoor	Brian Blutreich	Discus throw	3rd	
Men's	1990 Outdoor	John Knight	Hammer throw	5th	
Women's	1990 Outdoor	Janenne Vickers	100 meters hurdles	4th	
Women's	1990 Outdoor	Janeene Vickers	400 meters hurdles	1st	
Women's	1990 Outdoor	Adriene Harper	4 × 100 meters relay	3rd	
Women's	1990 Outdoor	Angela Burnham	4 × 100 meters relay	3rd	
Women's	1990 Outdoor	Tonya Sedwick	4 × 100 meters relay	3rd	
Women's	1990 Outdoor	Janeene Vickers	4 × 100 meters relay	3rd	
Women's	1990 Outdoor	Julie Johnson	4 × 400 meters relay	4th	
Women's	1990 Outdoor	Tonya Sedwick	4 × 400 meters relay	4th	
Women's	1990 Outdoor	Angela Burnham	4 × 400 meters relay	4th	
Women's	1990 Outdoor	Janeene Vickers	4 × 400 meters relay	4th	
Women's	1990 Outdoor	Tracie Millett	Shot put	1st	
Women's	1990 Outdoor	Tracie Millett	Discus throw	1st	
Men's	1991 Indoor	Eric Bergreen	Shot put	1st	
Women's	1991 Indoor	Janeene Vickers	55 meters hurdles	5th	
Women's	1991 Indoor	Tracie Millett	Shot put	1st	
Men's	1991 Outdoor	Marty Beck	400 meters hurdles	4th	
Men's	1991 Outdoor	McArthur Anderson	Triple jump	5th	
Men's	1991 Outdoor	Eric Bergreen	Shot put	4th	
Men's	1991 Outdoor	Eric Bergreen	Hammer throw	8th	
Women's	1991 Outdoor	Janeene Vickers	400 meters hurdles	1st	
Women's	1991 Outdoor	Tracie Millett	Shot put	3rd	
Women's	1991 Outdoor	Dawn Dumble	Shot put	4th	
Women's	1991 Outdoor	Melisa Weis	Shot put	7th	
Women's	1991 Outdoor	Tracie Millett	Discus throw	2nd	
Women's	1991 Outdoor	Dawn Dumble	Discus throw	5th	
Women's	1992 Indoor	Dawn Dumble	Shot put	1st	
Women's	1992 Indoor	Melisa Weis	Shot put	4th	
Men's	1992 Outdoor	Marty Beck	400 meters hurdles	2nd	
Men's	1992 Outdoor	Mike Stevenson	4 × 400 meters relay	6th	
Men's	1992 Outdoor	Michael Williams	4 × 400 meters relay	6th	
Men's	1992 Outdoor	Marty Beck	4 × 400 meters relay	6th	
Men's	1992 Outdoor	Derrick Baker	4 × 400 meters relay	6th	
Men's	1992 Outdoor	Charles Rogers	Triple jump	7th	
Men's	1992 Outdoor	John Godina	Shot put	7th	
Men's	1992 Outdoor	David Bunevacz	Javelin throw	2nd	
Women's	1992 Outdoor	Dawn Dumble	Shot put	4th	
Women's	1992 Outdoor	Dawn Dumble	Discus throw	4th	
Men's	1993 Indoor	John Godina	Shot put	3rd	
Men's	1993 Indoor	Joe Bailey	Shot put	6th	
Women's	1993 Indoor	Dawn Dumble	Shot put	3rd	
Men's	1993 Outdoor	Charles Rogers	Triple jump	8th	
Men's	1993 Outdoor	John Godina	Shot put	2nd	
Men's	1993 Outdoor	Joe Bailey	Shot put	7th	
Men's	1993 Outdoor	Mark Parlin	Shot put	8th	
Men's	1993 Outdoor	John Godina	Discus throw	6th	
Men's	1993 Outdoor	Erik Smith	Javelin throw	1st	
Women's	1993 Outdoor	Shelly Tochluk	4 × 400 meters relay	6th	
Women's	1993 Outdoor	Shelia Burrell	4 × 400 meters relay	6th	
Women's	1993 Outdoor	Erin Blunt	4 × 400 meters relay	6th	
Women's	1993 Outdoor	Camille Noel	4 × 400 meters relay	6th	
Women's	1993 Outdoor	Roshanda Glenn	Triple jump	2nd	
Women's	1993 Outdoor	Dawn Dumble	Shot put	1st	
Women's	1993 Outdoor	Jenni Whelchel	Shot put	7th	
Women's	1993 Outdoor	Valeyta Althouse	Shot put	8th	
Women's	1993 Outdoor	Dawn Dumble	Discus throw	2nd	
Women's	1993 Outdoor	Marieke Veltman	Heptathlon	3rd	
Men's	1994 Indoor	Marcus Reed	55 meters	3rd	
Men's	1994 Indoor	Ross Flowers	55 meters hurdles	8th	
Men's	1994 Indoor	John Godina	Shot put	1st	
Men's	1994 Indoor	Jonathon Ogden	Shot put	5th	
Men's	1994 Indoor	Joe Bailey	Shot put	6th	
Men's	1994 Indoor	Mark Parlin	Shot put	8th	
Women's	1994 Indoor	Amy Acuff	High jump	1st	
Women's	1994 Indoor	Valeyta Althouse	Shot put	4th	
Men's	1994 Outdoor	Michael Williams	4 × 100 meters relay	8th	
Men's	1994 Outdoor	Ross Flowers	4 × 100 meters relay	8th	
Men's	1994 Outdoor	Marcus Reed	4 × 100 meters relay	8th	
Men's	1994 Outdoor	Gentry Bradley	4 × 100 meters relay	8th	
Men's	1994 Outdoor	John Godina	Shot put	3rd	
Men's	1994 Outdoor	John Godina	Discus throw	1st	
Men's	1994 Outdoor	Greg Johnson	Javelin throw	8th	
Women's	1994 Outdoor	Keisha Marvin	400 meters hurdles	2nd	
Women's	1994 Outdoor	Karen Hecox	3000 meters	1st	
Women's	1994 Outdoor	Beth Bartholomew	5000 meters	7th	
Women's	1994 Outdoor	Amy Acuff	High jump	2nd	
Women's	1994 Outdoor	Roshanda Glenn	Triple jump	3rd	
Women's	1994 Outdoor	Valeyta Althouse	Shot put	2nd	
Men's	1995 Indoor	John Godina	Shot put	1st	
Men's	1995 Indoor	Mark Parlin	Shot put	2nd	
Men's	1995 Indoor	Jonathon Ogden	Shot put	5th	
Women's	1995 Indoor	Karen Hecox	Mile run	3rd	
Women's	1995 Indoor	Amy Acuff	High jump	1st	
Women's	1995 Indoor	Dawn Dumble	Shot put	1st	
Women's	1995 Indoor	Valeyta Althouse	Shot put	3rd	
Women's	1995 Indoor	Nada Kawar	Shot put	4th	
Men's	1995 Outdoor	Ato Boldon	200 meters	1st	
Men's	1995 Outdoor	Meb Keflezighi	5000 meters	5th	
Men's	1995 Outdoor	John Godina	Shot put	1st	
Men's	1995 Outdoor	Mark Parlin	Shot put	3rd	
Men's	1995 Outdoor	Jon Ogden	Shot put	4th	
Men's	1995 Outdoor	John Godina	Discus throw	1st	
Men's	1995 Outdoor	Greg Johnson	Javelin throw	1st	
Women's	1995 Outdoor	Karen Hecox	3000 meters	3rd	
Women's	1995 Outdoor	Camille Noel	4 × 400 meters relay	4th	
Women's	1995 Outdoor	Shelia Burrell	4 × 400 meters relay	4th	
Women's	1995 Outdoor	Darlene Malco	4 × 400 meters relay	4th	
Women's	1995 Outdoor	Cicely Scott	4 × 400 meters relay	4th	
Women's	1995 Outdoor	Amy Acuff	High jump	1st	
Women's	1995 Outdoor	Valeyta Althouse	Shot put	1st	
Women's	1995 Outdoor	Dawn Dumble	Shot put	2nd	
Women's	1995 Outdoor	Dawn Dumble	Discus throw	1st	
Women's	1995 Outdoor	Suzy Powell-Roos	Discus throw	5th	
Women's	1995 Outdoor	Shelia Burrell	Heptathlon	4th	
Men's	1996 Indoor	Scott Slover	Pole vault	6th	
Men's	1996 Indoor	Jonathan Ogden	Shot put	1st	
Men's	1996 Indoor	Mark Parlin	Shot put	2nd	
Women's	1996 Indoor	Amy Acuff	High jump	3rd	
Women's	1996 Indoor	Valeyta Althouse	Shot put	1st	
Women's	1996 Indoor	Nada Kawar	Shot put	3rd	
Men's	1996 Outdoor	Ato Boldon	100 meters	1st	
Men's	1996 Outdoor	Gentry Bradley	200 meters	2nd	
Men's	1996 Outdoor	Akiel Davis	4 × 100 meters relay	2nd	
Men's	1996 Outdoor	Ato Boldon	4 × 100 meters relay	2nd	
Men's	1996 Outdoor	Erik Allen	4 × 100 meters relay	2nd	
Men's	1996 Outdoor	Gentry Bradley	4 × 100 meters relay	2nd	
Men's	1996 Outdoor	Scott Slover	Pole vault	5th	
Men's	1996 Outdoor	Mark Parlin	Shot put	3rd	
Men's	1996 Outdoor	David Dumble	Discus throw	8th	
Women's	1996 Outdoor	Amy Acuff	High jump	1st	
Women's	1996 Outdoor	Valeyta Althouse	Shot put	2nd	
Women's	1996 Outdoor	Suzy Powell-Roos	Discus throw	2nd	
Men's	1997 Indoor	Meb Keflezighi	5000 meters	1st	
Men's	1997 Indoor	Scott Slover	Pole vault	6th	
Men's	1997 Indoor	Travis Haynes	Shot put	4th	
Women's	1997 Indoor	Joanna Hayes	55 meters hurdles	3rd	
Women's	1997 Indoor	Amy Acuff	High jump	1st	
Women's	1997 Indoor	Seilala Sua	Shot put	3rd	
Women's	1997 Indoor	Rachelle Noble	Weight throw	7th	
Men's	1997 Outdoor	Meb Keflezighi	5000 meters	1st	
Men's	1997 Outdoor	Meb Keflezighi	10,000 meters	1st	
Men's	1997 Outdoor	David Dumble	Discus throw	3rd	
Men's	1997 Outdoor	Josh Johnson	Javelin throw	4th	
Women's	1997 Outdoor	Joanna Hayes	400 meters hurdles	7th	
Women's	1997 Outdoor	Bisa Grant	4 × 100 meters relay	6th	
Women's	1997 Outdoor	Andrea Anderson	4 × 100 meters relay	6th	
Women's	1997 Outdoor	Darlene Malco	4 × 100 meters relay	6th	
Women's	1997 Outdoor	Joanna Hayes	4 × 100 meters relay	6th	
Women's	1997 Outdoor	Amy Acuff	High jump	2nd	
Women's	1997 Outdoor	Seilala Sua	Shot put	3rd	
Women's	1997 Outdoor	Nada Kawar	Shot put	4th	
Women's	1997 Outdoor	Seilala Sua	Discus throw	1st	
Women's	1997 Outdoor	Suzy Powell-Roos	Discus throw	2nd	
Women's	1997 Outdoor	Nada Kawar	Discus throw	6th	
Women's	1997 Outdoor	Rachelle Noble	Discus throw	8th	
Women's	1997 Outdoor	Rachelle Noble	Hammer throw	7th	
Women's	1997 Outdoor	Suzy Powell-Roos	Javelin throw	2nd	
Men's	1998 Indoor	Damian Allen	200 meters	7th	
Men's	1998 Indoor	Meb Keflezighi	5000 meters	3rd	
Men's	1998 Indoor	Mark Hauser	Distance medley relay	7th	
Men's	1998 Indoor	Jim McElroy	Distance medley relay	7th	
Men's	1998 Indoor	Jess Strutzel	Distance medley relay	7th	
Men's	1998 Indoor	Meb Keflezighi	Distance medley relay	7th	
Men's	1998 Indoor	Scott Slover	Pole vault	7th	
Men's	1998 Indoor	Travis Haynes	Shot put	8th	
Men's	1998 Indoor	Luke Sullivan	Weight throw	5th	
Women's	1998 Indoor	Shakedia Jones	200 meters	8th	
Women's	1998 Indoor	Erica Hoernig	Pole vault	6th	
Women's	1998 Indoor	Deana Simmons	Triple jump	6th	
Women's	1998 Indoor	Seilala Sua	Shot put	7th	
Women's	1998 Indoor	Rachelle Noble	Weight throw	7th	
Men's	1998 Outdoor	Jess Strutzel	800 meters	5th	
Men's	1998 Outdoor	Meb Keflezighi	5000 meters	4th	
Men's	1998 Outdoor	Meb Keflezighi	10,000 meters	4th	
Men's	1998 Outdoor	Brian Fell	4 × 100 meters relay	4th	
Men's	1998 Outdoor	Brandon Thomas	4 × 100 meters relay	4th	
Men's	1998 Outdoor	Damian Allen	4 × 100 meters relay	4th	
Men's	1998 Outdoor	Jim McElroy	4 × 100 meters relay	4th	
Men's	1998 Outdoor	Scott Slover	Pole vault	3rd	
Men's	1998 Outdoor	Mel Moultry	Triple jump	6th	
Men's	1998 Outdoor	Wade Tift	Shot put	6th	
Men's	1998 Outdoor	Luke Sullivan	Discus throw	7th	
Men's	1998 Outdoor	Josh Johnson	Javelin throw	4th	
Women's	1998 Outdoor	Shakedia Jones	100 meters	2nd	
Women's	1998 Outdoor	Joanna Hayes	100 meters hurdles	8th	
Women's	1998 Outdoor	Shakedia Jones	200 meters	3rd	
Women's	1998 Outdoor	Michelle Perry	4 × 100 meters relay	4th	
Women's	1998 Outdoor	Shakedia Jones	4 × 100 meters relay	4th	
Women's	1998 Outdoor	Andrea Anderson	4 × 100 meters relay	4th	
Women's	1998 Outdoor	Bisa Grant	4 × 100 meters relay	4th	
Women's	1998 Outdoor	Deana Simmons	Triple jump	4th	
Women's	1998 Outdoor	Nada Kawar	Shot put	3rd	
Women's	1998 Outdoor	Seilala Sua	Shot put	6th	
Women's	1998 Outdoor	Seilala Sua	Discus throw	1st	
Women's	1998 Outdoor	Suzy Powell-Roos	Discus throw	4th	
Women's	1998 Outdoor	Nada Kawar	Discus throw	6th	
Women's	1998 Outdoor	Rachelle Noble	Discus throw	7th	
Women's	1998 Outdoor	Suzy Powell-Roos	Javelin throw	8th	
Men's	1999 Indoor	Jess Strutzel	800 meters	3rd	
Men's	1999 Indoor	Jess Strutzel	Distance medley relay	1st	
Men's	1999 Indoor	Brian Fell	Distance medley relay	1st	
Men's	1999 Indoor	Michael Granville	Distance medley relay	1st	
Men's	1999 Indoor	Mark Hauser	Distance medley relay	1st	
Men's	1999 Indoor	Wade Tift	Shot put	8th	
Women's	1999 Indoor	Erica Hoernig	Pole vault	4th	
Women's	1999 Indoor	Tracy O'Hara	Pole vault	7th	
Women's	1999 Indoor	Seilala Sua	Shot put	3rd	
Women's	1999 Indoor	Chanique Ross	Shot put	6th	
Women's	1999 Indoor	Seilala Sua	Weight throw	3rd	
Men's	1999 Outdoor	Michael Granville	4 × 400 meters relay	1st	
Men's	1999 Outdoor	Terrence Williams	4 × 400 meters relay	1st	
Men's	1999 Outdoor	Malachi Davis	4 × 400 meters relay	1st	
Men's	1999 Outdoor	Brian Fell	4 × 400 meters relay	1st	
Men's	1999 Outdoor	Wade Tift	Shot put	8th	
Women's	1999 Outdoor	Shadekia Jones	100 meters	7th	
Women's	1999 Outdoor	Joanna Hayes	100 meters hurdles	3rd	
Women's	1999 Outdoor	Joanna Hayes	400 meters hurdles	1st	
Women's	1999 Outdoor	Michelle Perry	4 × 100 meters relay	3rd	
Women's	1999 Outdoor	Shakedia Jones	4 × 100 meters relay	3rd	
Women's	1999 Outdoor	Andrea Anderson	4 × 100 meters relay	3rd	
Women's	1999 Outdoor	Keyon Soley	4 × 100 meters relay	3rd	
Women's	1999 Outdoor	Ysanne Williams	4 × 400 meters relay	3rd	
Women's	1999 Outdoor	Andrea Anderson	4 × 400 meters relay	3rd	
Women's	1999 Outdoor	Keyon Soley	4 × 400 meters relay	3rd	
Women's	1999 Outdoor	Michelle Perry	4 × 400 meters relay	3rd	
Women's	1999 Outdoor	Tracy O'Hara	Pole vault	2nd	
Women's	1999 Outdoor	Keyon Soley	Long jump	7th	
Women's	1999 Outdoor	Seilala Sua	Shot put	1st	
Women's	1999 Outdoor	Seilala Sua	Discus throw	1st	
Men's	2000 Indoor	Jess Strutzel	800 meters	1st	
Men's	2000 Indoor	Brian McLaughlin	Pole vault	4th	
Women's	2000 Indoor	Shakedia Jones	60 meters	6th	
Women's	2000 Indoor	Tracy O'Hara	Pole vault	1st	
Women's	2000 Indoor	Keyon Soley	Long jump	1st	
Women's	2000 Indoor	Seilala Sua	Shot put	1st	
Women's	2000 Indoor	Christina Tolson	Shot put	3rd	
Women's	2000 Indoor	Chaniqua Ross	Shot put	6th	
Women's	2000 Indoor	Seilala Sua	Weight throw	2nd	
Women's	2000 Indoor	Christina Tolson	Weight throw	8th	
Men's	2000 Outdoor	Jess Strutzel	800 meters	5th	
Women's	2000 Outdoor	Shakedia Jones	100 meters	6th	
Women's	2000 Outdoor	Michelle Perry	400 meters hurdles	4th	
Women's	2000 Outdoor	Tracy O'Hara	Pole vault	1st	
Women's	2000 Outdoor	Seilala Sua	Shot put	1st	
Women's	2000 Outdoor	Christina Tolson	Shot put	5th	
Women's	2000 Outdoor	Seilala Sua	Discus throw	1st	
Women's	2000 Outdoor	Christina Tolson	Hammer throw	5th	
Women's	2000 Outdoor	Cari Soong	Hammer throw	8th	
Men's	2001 Indoor	Scott Moser	Shot put	8th	
Women's	2001 Indoor	Shakedia Jones	60 meters	5th	
Women's	2001 Indoor	Michelle Perry	60 meters hurdles	5th	
Women's	2001 Indoor	Bunmi Ogumleye	4 × 400 meters relay	5th	
Women's	2001 Indoor	Sheena Johnson	4 × 400 meters relay	5th	
Women's	2001 Indoor	Ysanne Williams	4 × 400 meters relay	5th	
Women's	2001 Indoor	Adia McKinnon	4 × 400 meters relay	5th	
Women's	2001 Indoor	Darnesha Griffith	High jump	4th	
Women's	2001 Indoor	Tracy O'Hara	Pole vault	2nd	
Women's	2001 Indoor	Deana Simmons	Triple jump	2nd	
Women's	2001 Indoor	Christina Tolson	Shot put	1st	
Women's	2001 Indoor	Jessica Cosby	Shot put	5th	
Women's	2001 Indoor	Christina Tolson	Weight throw	2nd	
Men's	2001 Outdoor	Scott Moser	Discus throw	3rd	
Women's	2001 Outdoor	Shakedia Jones	100 meters	2nd	
Women's	2001 Outdoor	Michelle Perry	400 meters hurdles	7th	
Women's	2001 Outdoor	Ysanne Williams	800 meters	7th	
Women's	2001 Outdoor	Michelle Perry	4 × 400 meters relay	5th	
Women's	2001 Outdoor	Sheena Johnson	4 × 400 meters relay	5th	
Women's	2001 Outdoor	Ysanne Williams	4 × 400 meters relay	5th	
Women's	2001 Outdoor	Adia McKinnon	4 × 400 meters relay	5th	
Women's	2001 Outdoor	Tracy O'Hara	Pole vault	2nd	
Women's	2001 Outdoor	Christina Tolson	Shot put	1st	
Women's	2001 Outdoor	Chaniqua Ross	Discus throw	3rd	
Women's	2001 Outdoor	Christina Tolson	Hammer throw	2nd	
Women's	2001 Outdoor	Michelle Perry	Heptathlon	2nd	
Women's	2002 Indoor	Lena Nilsson	Mile run	2nd	
Women's	2002 Indoor	Ysanne Williams	4 × 400 meters relay	5th	
Women's	2002 Indoor	Monique Henderson	4 × 400 meters relay	5th	
Women's	2002 Indoor	Tiffany Burgess	4 × 400 meters relay	5th	
Women's	2002 Indoor	Sheena Johnson	4 × 400 meters relay	5th	
Women's	2002 Indoor	Tiffany Burgess	Distance medley relay	1st	
Women's	2002 Indoor	Monique Henderson	Distance medley relay	1st	
Women's	2002 Indoor	Jessica Marr	Distance medley relay	1st	
Women's	2002 Indoor	Lena Nilsson	Distance medley relay	1st	
Women's	2002 Indoor	Darnesha Griffith	High jump	1st	
Women's	2002 Indoor	Tracy O'Hara	Pole vault	2nd	
Women's	2002 Indoor	Jessica Cosby	Shot put	6th	
Men's	2002 Outdoor	Dan Ames	Shot put	7th	
Men's	2002 Outdoor	Scott Moser	Discus throw	4th	
Men's	2002 Outdoor	Dan Ames	Discus throw	8th	
Women's	2002 Outdoor	Monique Henderson	400 meters	7th	
Women's	2002 Outdoor	Sheena Johnson	400 meters hurdles	4th	
Women's	2002 Outdoor	Lena Nilsson	1500 meters	1st	
Women's	2002 Outdoor	Bunmi Ogunleye	4 × 400 meters relay	3rd	
Women's	2002 Outdoor	Adia McKinnon	4 × 400 meters relay	3rd	
Women's	2002 Outdoor	Sheena Johnson	4 × 400 meters relay	3rd	
Women's	2002 Outdoor	Monique Henderson	4 × 400 meters relay	3rd	
Women's	2002 Outdoor	Darnesha Griffith	High jump	1st	
Women's	2002 Outdoor	Tracy O'Hara	Pole vault	1st	
Women's	2002 Outdoor	Jessica Cosby	Shot put	1st	
Women's	2002 Outdoor	Chaniqua Ross	Discus throw	1st	
Women's	2002 Outdoor	Lara Saye	Discus throw	5th	
Women's	2002 Outdoor	Cari Soong	Hammer throw	4th	
Men's	2003 Indoor	Dan Ames	Shot put	4th	
Men's	2003 Indoor	Dan Ames	Weight throw	6th	
Women's	2003 Indoor	Sheena Johnson	60 meters hurdles	7th	
Women's	2003 Indoor	Lena Nilsson	800 meters	1st	
Women's	2003 Indoor	Tiffany Burgess	800 meters	8th	
Women's	2003 Indoor	Adia McKinnon	4 × 400 meters relay	4th	
Women's	2003 Indoor	Sheena Johnson	4 × 400 meters relay	4th	
Women's	2003 Indoor	Sani Roseby	4 × 400 meters relay	4th	
Women's	2003 Indoor	Monique Henderson	4 × 400 meters relay	4th	
Women's	2003 Indoor	Cari Soong	Weight throw	3rd	
Men's	2003 Outdoor	Yoo Kim	Pole vault	5th	
Men's	2003 Outdoor	Pat Luke	Pole vault	7th	
Men's	2003 Outdoor	Juaune Armon	Long jump	5th	
Men's	2003 Outdoor	Dan Ames	Shot put	6th	
Men's	2003 Outdoor	Scott Wiegand	Shot put	7th	
Women's	2003 Outdoor	Sheena Johnson	100 meters hurdles	8th	
Women's	2003 Outdoor	Monique Henderson	400 meters	7th	
Women's	2003 Outdoor	Sheena Johnson	400 meters hurdles	1st	
Women's	2003 Outdoor	Ysanne Williams	400 meters hurdles	6th	
Women's	2003 Outdoor	Lena Nilsson	1500 meters	2nd	
Women's	2003 Outdoor	Cari Soong	Hammer throw	5th	
Men's	2004 Indoor	Juaune Armon	Long jump	4th	
Men's	2004 Indoor	Dan Ames	Shot put	3rd	
Men's	2004 Indoor	Dan Ames	Weight throw	3rd	
Women's	2004 Indoor	Sheena Johnson	60 meters hurdles	3rd	
Women's	2004 Indoor	Dawn Harper	60 meters hurdles	4th	
Women's	2004 Indoor	Melissa McBain	Distance medley relay	3rd	
Women's	2004 Indoor	Sheena Johnson	Distance medley relay	3rd	
Women's	2004 Indoor	Ashley Caldwell	Distance medley relay	3rd	
Women's	2004 Indoor	Lena Nilsson	Distance medley relay	3rd	
Women's	2004 Indoor	Chelsea Johnson	Pole vault	2nd	
Women's	2004 Indoor	Renee Williams	Long jump	6th	
Women's	2004 Indoor	Candice Baucham	Triple jump	3rd	
Women's	2004 Indoor	Jessica Cosby	Shot put	4th	
Women's	2004 Indoor	Cari Soong	Weight throw	8th	
Men's	2004 Outdoor	Brandon Johnson	4 × 400 meters relay	7th	
Men's	2004 Outdoor	Jonathan Williams	4 × 400 meters relay	7th	
Men's	2004 Outdoor	Denye Versher	4 × 400 meters relay	7th	
Men's	2004 Outdoor	Craig Everhart	4 × 400 meters relay	7th	
Men's	2004 Outdoor	Yoo Kim	Pole vault	2nd	
Men's	2004 Outdoor	Juaune Armon	Long jump	5th	
Men's	2004 Outdoor	Dan Ames	Shot put	6th	
Women's	2004 Outdoor	Sheena Johnson	100 meters hurdles	3rd	
Women's	2004 Outdoor	Dawn Harper	100 meters hurdles	8th	
Women's	2004 Outdoor	Monique Henderson	400 meters	2nd	
Women's	2004 Outdoor	Sheena Johnson	400 meters hurdles	1st	
Women's	2004 Outdoor	Sani Roseby	4 × 100 meters relay	2nd	
Women's	2004 Outdoor	Sheena Johnson	4 × 100 meters relay	2nd	
Women's	2004 Outdoor	Dawn Harper	4 × 100 meters relay	2nd	
Women's	2004 Outdoor	Monique Henderson	4 × 100 meters relay	2nd	
Women's	2004 Outdoor	Sani Roseby	4 × 400 meters relay	4th	
Women's	2004 Outdoor	Sheena Johnson	4 × 400 meters relay	4th	
Women's	2004 Outdoor	Adia McKinnon	4 × 400 meters relay	4th	
Women's	2004 Outdoor	Monique Henderson	4 × 400 meters relay	4th	
Women's	2004 Outdoor	Sheena Gordon	High jump	4th	
Women's	2004 Outdoor	Chelsea Johnson	Pole vault	1st	
Women's	2004 Outdoor	Jackie Ngyuen	Pole vault	5th	
Women's	2004 Outdoor	Jessica Cosby	Hammer throw	2nd	
Women's	2004 Outdoor	Cari Soong	Hammer throw	5th	
Men's	2005 Indoor	Craig Everhart	400 meters	8th	
Men's	2005 Indoor	Ben Aragon	Distance medley relay	2nd	
Men's	2005 Indoor	Craig Everhart	Distance medley relay	2nd	
Men's	2005 Indoor	Martell Munguia	Distance medley relay	2nd	
Men's	2005 Indoor	Jon Rankin	Distance medley relay	2nd	
Women's	2005 Indoor	Dawn Harper	60 meters hurdles	3rd	
Women's	2005 Indoor	Candice Baucham	Triple jump	3rd	
Women's	2005 Indoor	Chaytan Hill	Triple jump	4th	
Men's	2005 Outdoor	Brandon Johnson	400 meters hurdles	4th	
Men's	2005 Outdoor	Jonathan Williams	400 meters hurdles	7th	
Men's	2005 Outdoor	Erik Emilsson	3000 meters steeplechase	8th	
Women's	2005 Outdoor	Dawn Harper	100 meters hurdles	3rd	
Women's	2005 Outdoor	Monique Henderson	400 meters	1st	
Women's	2005 Outdoor	Candice Baucham	Long jump	5th	
Women's	2005 Outdoor	Candice Baucham	Triple jump	1st	
Women's	2005 Outdoor	Jessica Cosby	Shot put	3rd	
Women's	2005 Outdoor	Kamaiya Warren	Discus throw	3rd	
Women's	2005 Outdoor	Jessica Cosby	Hammer throw	3rd	
Men's	2006 Indoor	Craig Everhart	4 × 400 meters relay	7th	
Men's	2006 Indoor	Elijah Wells	4 × 400 meters relay	7th	
Men's	2006 Indoor	James Rhoades	4 × 400 meters relay	7th	
Men's	2006 Indoor	Brandon Johnson	4 × 400 meters relay	7th	
Women's	2006 Indoor	Dawn Harper	60 meters hurdles	3rd	
Women's	2006 Indoor	Chelsea Johnson	Pole vault	1st	
Men's	2006 Outdoor	Kevin Craddock	110 meters hurdles	8th	
Men's	2006 Outdoor	Craig Everhart	400 meters	7th	
Men's	2006 Outdoor	Mike Landers	Pole vault	3rd	
Men's	2006 Outdoor	Greg Garza	Discus throw	7th	
Women's	2006 Outdoor	Dawn Harper	100 meters hurdles	4th	
Women's	2006 Outdoor	Nicole Leach	400 meters hurdles	4th	
Women's	2006 Outdoor	Chelsea Johnson	Pole vault	2nd	
Women's	2007 Indoor	Allie Bohannon	Mile run	2nd	
Women's	2007 Indoor	Ingrid Kantola	Pole vault	4th	
Women's	2007 Indoor	Rhonda Watkins	Long jump	1st	
Men's	2007 Outdoor	Brandon Johnson	400 meters hurdles	2nd	
Men's	2007 Outdoor	Mike Landers	Pole vault	2nd	
Men's	2007 Outdoor	Greg Garza	Discus throw	4th	
Women's	2007 Outdoor	Nicole Leach	400 meters hurdles	1st	
Women's	2007 Outdoor	Johanna Monthe	4 × 400 meters relay	4th	
Women's	2007 Outdoor	Maris Wisdom	4 × 400 meters relay	4th	
Women's	2007 Outdoor	Krystin Lacy	4 × 400 meters relay	4th	
Women's	2007 Outdoor	Nicole Leach	4 × 400 meters relay	4th	
Women's	2007 Outdoor	Rhonda Watkins	High jump	5th	
Women's	2007 Outdoor	Ingrid Kantola	Pole vault	8th	
Women's	2007 Outdoor	Rhonda Watkins	Long jump	1st	
Men's	2008 Indoor	Marlon Patterson	Distance medley relay	7th	
Men's	2008 Indoor	Elijah Wells	Distance medley relay	7th	
Men's	2008 Indoor	Cory Primm	Distance medley relay	7th	
Men's	2008 Indoor	Laef Barnes	Distance medley relay	7th	
Men's	2008 Indoor	Dustin Deleo	Pole vault	7th	
Men's	2008 Indoor	John Caulfield	Shot put	4th	
Men's	2008 Indoor	Darius Savage	Shot put	6th	
Men's	2008 Indoor	Boldizsar Kocsor	Weight throw	7th	
Women's	2008 Indoor	Tori Anthony	Pole vault	8th	
Men's	2008 Outdoor	Johnny Quinn	Pole vault	8th	
Men's	2008 Outdoor	Greg Garza	Discus throw	7th	
Men's	2008 Outdoor	Boldi Kocsor	Hammer throw	4th	
Women's	2008 Outdoor	Nicole Leach	400 meters hurdles	2nd	
Women's	2008 Outdoor	Merice Wisdom	4 × 400 meters relay	8th	
Women's	2008 Outdoor	Krystin Lacy	4 × 400 meters relay	8th	
Women's	2008 Outdoor	Krishna Curry	4 × 400 meters relay	8th	
Women's	2008 Outdoor	Nicole Leach	4 × 400 meters relay	8th	
Men's	2009 Indoor	Boldizsar Kocsor	Weight throw	6th	
Women's	2009 Indoor	Rhonda Watkins	Long jump	3rd	
Women's	2009 Outdoor	Nicole Leach	400 meters hurdles	1st	
Women's	2009 Outdoor	Rhonda Watkins	Long jump	4th	
Women's	2010 Indoor	Danielle Watson	Long jump	8th	
Men's	2010 Outdoor	Cory Primm	800 meters	5th	
Women's	2010 Outdoor	Tori Pena	Pole vault	3rd	
Women's	2010 Outdoor	Katy Viuf	Pole vault	4th	
Men's	2011 Indoor	Alec Faldermeyer	Weight throw	6th	
Men's	2011 Outdoor	Cory Primm	800 meters	6th	
Men's	2011 Outdoor	Alec Faldermeyer	Hammer throw	5th	
Women's	2011 Outdoor	Turquoise Thompson	400 meters hurdles	2nd	
Men's	2012 Indoor	Alec Faldermeyer	Weight throw	5th	
Women's	2012 Indoor	Ida Storm	Weight throw	2nd	
Men's	2012 Outdoor	Mike Woepse	Pole vault	2nd	
Men's	2012 Outdoor	Alec Faldermeyer	Hammer throw	3rd	
Men's	2012 Outdoor	Marcus Nilsson	Decathlon	6th	
Women's	2012 Outdoor	Turquoise Thompson	400 meters hurdles	2nd	
Women's	2012 Outdoor	Kylie Price	Long jump	7th	
Women's	2012 Outdoor	Ida Storm	Hammer throw	5th	
Men's	2013 Indoor	Mike Woepse	Pole vault	7th	
Women's	2013 Indoor	Brea Buchannan	60 meters hurdles	5th	
Women's	2013 Indoor	Allison Koressel	Pole vault	5th	
Women's	2013 Indoor	Kylie Price	Long jump	4th	
Men's	2013 Outdoor	Julian Wruck	Discus throw	1st	
Men's	2013 Outdoor	Alec Faldermeyer	Hammer throw	7th	
Men's	2013 Outdoor	Marcus Nilsson	Decathlon	3rd	
Women's	2013 Outdoor	Turquoise Thompson	400 meters hurdles	3rd	
Women's	2013 Outdoor	Kylie Price	Long jump	6th	
Women's	2013 Outdoor	Ida Storm	Hammer throw	5th	
Men's	2014 Indoor	Marcus Nilsson	Heptathlon	8th	
Women's	2014 Indoor	Ida Storm	Weight throw	2nd	
Men's	2014 Outdoor	Julian Wruck	Discus throw	2nd	
Women's	2014 Outdoor	Kylie Price	Long jump	3rd	
Men's	2015 Indoor	Mike Woepse	Pole vault	7th	
Women's	2015 Indoor	Ida Storm	Weight throw	2nd	
Men's	2016 Indoor	Ferdinand Edman	Distance medley relay	7th	
Men's	2016 Indoor	Joe Herrera	Distance medley relay	7th	
Men's	2016 Indoor	Nick Hartle	Distance medley relay	7th	
Men's	2016 Indoor	Austin O'Neil	Distance medley relay	7th	
Men's	2016 Indoor	Nicholas Scarvelis	Shot put	6th	
Men's	2016 Outdoor	Rai Benjamin	400 meters hurdles	6th	
Men's	2016 Outdoor	Nicholas Scarvelis	Shot put	4th	
Men's	2016 Outdoor	Braheme Days Jr.	Shot put	5th	
Men's	2017 Outdoor	Rai Benjamin	400 meters hurdles	2nd	
Women's	2018 Indoor	Jessie Maduka	Triple jump	3rd	
Women's	2018 Indoor	Ashlie Blake	Shot put	7th	
Men's	2018 Outdoor	Robert Brandt	10,000 meters	8th	
Women's	2018 Outdoor	Jessie Maduka	Triple jump	4th	
Women's	2018 Outdoor	Alyssa Wilson	Shot put	6th	
Women's	2018 Outdoor	Alyssa Wilson	Hammer throw	4th	
Women's	2018 Outdoor	Kendall Gustafson	Heptathlon	4th	
Men's	2019 Indoor	Robert Brandt	3000 meters	8th	
Men's	2019 Indoor	Robert Brandt	5000 meters	8th	
Women's	2019 Indoor	Alyssa Wilson	Shot put	4th	
Men's	2019 Outdoor	Robert Brandt	10,000 meters	7th	
Men's	2019 Outdoor	Sean Lee	High jump	6th	
Men's	2019 Outdoor	Dotun Ogundeji	Shot put	5th	
Men's	2019 Outdoor	Nate Esparza	Shot put	7th	
Men's	2019 Outdoor	Dotun Ogundeji	Discus throw	4th	
Women's	2019 Outdoor	Alyssa Wilson	Shot put	7th	
Women's	2019 Outdoor	Alyssa Wilson	Discus throw	7th	
Women's	2019 Outdoor	Alyssa Wilson	Hammer throw	3rd	
Men's	2021 Outdoor	Harrison Schrage	Long jump	6th	
Women's	2021 Outdoor	Meleni Rodney	4 × 400 meters relay	3rd	
Women's	2021 Outdoor	Makenzy Pierre-Webster	4 × 400 meters relay	3rd	
Women's	2021 Outdoor	Kate Jendrezak	4 × 400 meters relay	3rd	
Women's	2021 Outdoor	Shae Anderson	4 × 400 meters relay	3rd	
Women's	2022 Indoor	Catherine Leger	4 × 400 meters relay	6th	
Women's	2022 Indoor	Kate Jendrezak	4 × 400 meters relay	6th	
Women's	2022 Indoor	Maddy Doane	4 × 400 meters relay	6th	
Women's	2022 Indoor	Makenzy Pierre-Webster	4 × 400 meters relay	6th	
Women's	2022 Outdoor	Shae Anderson	400 meters	6th	
Women's	2022 Outdoor	Catherine Leger	4 × 400 meters relay	7th	
Women's	2022 Outdoor	Shae Anderson	4 × 400 meters relay	7th	
Women's	2022 Outdoor	Makenzy Pierre-Webster	4 × 400 meters relay	7th	
Women's	2022 Outdoor	Kate Jendrezak	4 × 400 meters relay	7th	
Women's	2023 Indoor	Gwyn George	Distance medley relay	4th	
Women's	2023 Indoor	Kate Jendrezak	Distance medley relay	4th	
Women's	2023 Indoor	Rose Pittman	Distance medley relay	4th	
Women's	2023 Indoor	Mia Barnett	Distance medley relay	4th	
Men's	2023 Outdoor	Antonie Nortje	4 × 400 meters relay	3rd	
Men's	2023 Outdoor	Willington Wright	4 × 400 meters relay	3rd	
Men's	2023 Outdoor	Myles Misener-Daley	4 × 400 meters relay	3rd	
Men's	2023 Outdoor	Cameron Reynolds	4 × 400 meters relay	3rd	
Women's	2023 Outdoor	Federica Botter	Javelin throw	7th	
Women's	2024 Outdoor	Mayyi Mahama	Hammer throw	6th	
Men's	2025 Indoor	Camryn O'Bannon	Long jump	7th	
Women's	2025 Indoor	Yanla Ndjip-Nyemeck	60 meters hurdles	8th	

== See also ==
- Category:UCLA Bruins men's track and field athletes (89)
- Category:UCLA Bruins women's track and field athletes (53)
