= 1966 NCAA University Division outdoor track and field championships =

1966 NCAA University Division Outdoor Track and Field Championships
- Team Champions: UCLA (2nd title)
- Edition: 45th
- Dates: June 16−18, 1966
- Host city: Bloomington, Indiana
- Venue: Billy Hayes Track; Indiana University

The 1966 NCAA University Division Outdoor Track and Field Championships were contested June 16−18 at the 45th annual NCAA-sanctioned track meet to determine the individual and team national champions of men's collegiate University Division outdoor track and field events in the United States.

That year's outdoor meet was hosted by the Indiana University at Billy Hayes Track in Bloomington.

UCLA easily topped the team standings, capturing their second national title.

Five events saw NCAA meet records set or tied.

- 100 yard dash, tied by Charles Greene of Nebraska (9.3)
- Three-mile run, set by Gerry Lindgren of Washington State (13:33.7)
- Shot put, set by Randy Matson of Texas A&M in the trials (65' 6 1/4), and reset in the finals (67' 1 1/2 ft)
- 440 yard relay, set by Tom Jones, Bob Frey, Ron Copeland, and Norm Jackson of UCLA (39.9)
- Discus, set by Gary Carlsen in finals (190' 1 1/2), and then bettered by Randy Matson of Texas A&M in the same finals (197' 0 ft)

== Team result ==
Rank	Team	Points
1st place, gold medalist(s)	UCLA	81
2nd place, silver medalist(s)	BYU	33
3rd place, bronze medalist(s)	San José State	32
4	Nebraska; USC	30
6	Washington State	29
7	Oregon	23
8	Penn State; Texas A&M	20
10	Villanova	19
11	Arizona; Boston College; New Mexico; Oklahoma State	16
15	Kansas	15
16	Maryland	14
17	Michigan State	13
18	Cal State LA; Colorado; Nevada	10
21	Southern Illinois; Stanford; California	9
24	Bates; San Diego State; Cal State LB; Miami; Utah State; Georgetown	8
30	Abilene Christian; Kentucky State	7
32	Toledo; Tennessee; Texas; Murray State; Witchita State; Washington	6
38	Iowa	5
39	Connecticut; Auburn; LSU	4
42	Army; Missouri	3
44	Ohio; Colgate; Kent State; Western Michigan; Bowling Green; Minnesota	2
50	Duke; South Carolina; Notre Dame; Florida; Oklahoma; Navy; E. Tennessee St.	1
