= Bill Green (hammer thrower) =

American hammer thrower

Personal information
- Born: William Hipkiss; April 28, 1960 (age 66) Laurel, Maryland
Medal record
Men's athletics
Representing United States
Pan American Games
| Disqualified | 1987 Indianapolis | Hammer throw |

William (Bill) Green (born April 28, 1960) is an American former track and field athlete. He is a former United States record holder and finished fifth in the hammer throw in the 1984 Olympic Games in Los Angeles, California.

== Early life ==
Green is the son an attorney who also acted in community theater Green's mother was a former mayor, city councilwoman and County Supervisor in Truckee, California

== Athletic career ==
Green became discus thrower in high school and failed to qualify for the California state meet. He was recruited by throwing coach Art Venegas near the beginning of his career and encouraged to try the hammer throw as a college freshman. As a hammer thrower, Green was an NCAA All American and an AAU National Junior Champion title holder in 1979, just five months with the event. He ranked third in the United States at the senior level three years later in 1982.

He placed tenth at the 1980 United States Olympic Trials. In 1983 and 1984 he set three American Collegiate Records, three United States National Records, and, after winning the American Olympic trials, he placed fifth at the 1984 Olympic Games. He is one of only three Americans since 1952 to place in the top five in Olympic competition.

Green was inducted into the Long Beach State Athletic Hall of Fame in October 2001.

== International competitions ==
| 1983 | Universiade | Edmonton, Canada | 4th | Hammer throw |
| 1984 | Olympic Games | Los Angeles, United States | 5th | Hammer throw |
| 1987 | Pan American Games | Indianapolis, United States | 2nd DQ | Hammer throw |

== National titles ==
- USA Outdoor Track and Field Championships
  - Hammer throw: 1986
- United States Olympic Trials
  - Hammer throw: 1984
- USA Outdoor Junior Track and Field Championships
  - Hammer throw: 1979

== See also ==
- List of Olympic medalists in athletics (men)
