= Ron Copeland (athlete) =

American athlete (1946–1975)

No. 36
- Position: Wide receiver

Personal information
- Born: October 3, 1946; Los Angeles, California, U.S.
- Died: May 22, 1975 (aged 28); Walnut, California, U.S.
- Listed height: 6 ft 5 in (1.96 m)
- Listed weight: 196 lb (89 kg)

Career information
- High school: Susan Miller Dorsey (Los Angeles)
- College: UCLA
- NFL draft: 1969: 7th round, 169th overall pick

Career history
- Chicago Bears (1969)

Awards and highlights
- Second-team All-Pac-8 (1968)
- Stats at Pro Football Reference

Ron Copeland
Medal record

Men's Athletics

Representing the United States

Pan American Games
| Gold medal – first place | 1967 Winnipeg | 4 × 100 metres relay |

Summer Universiade
| Silver medal – second place | 1967 Tokyo | 110 metres hurdles |

Ronald Wayne Copeland Sr. (October 3, 1946 – May 22, 1975) was an American hurdler, sprinter, and American football wide receiver. He played in the National Football League (NFL) for the Chicago Bears in 1969.

Copeland won three NCAA Division I Men's Outdoor Track and Field Championships titles for the UCLA Bruins track and field team, winning the 110 m hurdles, 4 × 100 m relay, and 4 × 400 m relay at the 1966 NCAA University Division outdoor track and field championships.
