= 1972 NCAA University Division Outdoor Track and Field Championships =

- Team Champions: UCLA (4th title)
- Edition: 51st
- Dates: June 1−3, 1972
- Host city: Eugene, Oregon
- Venue: Hayward Field; University of Oregon

The 1972 NCAA University Division Outdoor Track and Field Championships were contested June 1−3 at the 51st annual NCAA-sanctioned track meet to determine the individual and team national champions of men's collegiate University Division outdoor track and field events in the United States.

This year's outdoor meet was hosted by the University of Oregon at Hayward Field in Eugene, OR.

UCLA easily finished atop the team standings, capturing their second consecutive, and fourth overall, team national title.

== Team result ==
- Note: Top 10 only
- (H) = Hosts

Rank	Team	Points
1st place, gold medalist(s)	UCLA	82
2nd place, silver medalist(s)	USC	49
3rd place, bronze medalist(s)	UTEP	45
4	Oregon (H)	32
5	Kansas	25
6	Kent State; Rice; Washington	18
7	Kansas State	17
8	Purdue; Tennessee	16
9	Oklahoma State; Villanova	12
10	Bowling Green State; Connecticut; Georgetown; Ohio; Oregon State; Penn	10
