= 1991 NCAA Division I Outdoor Track and Field Championships =

- Men's Champion: Tennessee (2nd title); Women's Champion: LSU (5th title)
- Edition: 70th (Men); 10th (Women)
- Dates: May 29 − June 1, 1991
- Host city: Eugene, Oregon
- Venue: Hayward Field; University of Oregon

The 1991 NCAA Division I Outdoor Track and Field Championships were contested May 29 − June 1 at Hayward Field at the University of Oregon in Eugene, Oregon in order to determine the individual and team national champions of men's and women's collegiate Division I outdoor track and field events in the United States.

These were the 70th annual men's championships and the 10th annual women's championships. This was the Ducks' seventh time hosting the event and the first since 1988.

Tennessee and LSU topped the men's and women's team standings, respectively; it was the Volunteers' second men's team title (and first since 1971) and the fifth for the Lady Tigers. This would go on to be the fifth of LSU's eleven consecutive women's national championships in track and field between 1987 and 1997.

== Team results ==
- Note: Top 10 only
- (H) = Hosts
- Full results

=== Men's standings ===
| Rank | Team | Points |
|---|---|---|
| 1st place, gold medalist(s) | Tennessee | 51 |
| 2nd place, silver medalist(s) | Washington State | 42 |
| 3rd place, bronze medalist(s) | Oregon (H) | 36 |
| 4 | BYU | 35 |
| 5 | Texas | 27 1/2 |
| 6 | LSU | 26 |
| 7 | Arkansas | 24 |
| 8 | Georgetown | 23 |
| 9 | TCU | 22 |
| 10 | Georgia | 19 |

=== Women's standings ===
| Rank | Team | Points |
|---|---|---|
| 1st place, gold medalist(s) | LSU | 78 |
| 2nd place, silver medalist(s) | Texas | 67 |
| 3rd place, bronze medalist(s) | Nebraska | 43 |
| 4 | UCLA | 35 |
| 5 | Tennessee | 33 |
| 6 | Florida | 30 |
| 7 | Villanova | 28 |
| 8 | BYU | 26 |
| 9 | Florida State | 19 |
| 10 | Arkansas; North Carolina | 18 |
