= 1997 NCAA Division I Indoor Track and Field Championships =

- Organisers: NCAA
- Edition: 33rd (Men); 15th (Women)
- Dates: March 7-8, 1997
- Host city: Indianapolis, Indiana
- Venue: RCA Dome
- Level: Division I

The 1997 NCAA Division I Indoor Track and Field Championships were contested to determine the individual and team national champions of men's and women's NCAA collegiate indoor track and field events in the United States after the 1996–97 season, the 33rd annual meet for men and 15th annual meet for women.

The championships were again held at the RCA Dome in Indianapolis, Indiana.

Arkansas won the men's team title, the Razorbacks' thirteenth overall and thirteenth in fourteen years.

Four-time defending champions LSU again won the women's team title, the Lady Tigers' eighth.

== Qualification ==
All teams and athletes from Division I indoor track and field programs were eligible to compete for this year's individual and team titles.

== Team standings ==
- Note: Top 10 only
- Scoring: 6 points for a 1st-place finish in an event, 4 points for 2nd, 3 points for 3rd, 2 points for 4th, and 1 point for 5th
- (DC) = Defending Champions

=== Men's title ===
- 66 teams scored at least one point

Rank	Team	Points
1st place, gold medalist(s)	Arkansas	59
2nd place, silver medalist(s)	Auburn	27
3rd place, bronze medalist(s)	Georgia Tech	25
3rd place, bronze medalist(s)	Iowa State	25
3rd place, bronze medalist(s)	Oklahoma	25
6	George Mason (DC)	24
7	South Carolina	21
8	Boston College	18
9	UCLA	17
T10	LSU	16
T10	Minnesota	16
T10	Tennessee	16

=== Women's title ===
- 50 teams scored at least one point

Rank	Team	Points
1st place, gold medalist(s)	LSU (DC)	49
2nd place, silver medalist(s)	Texas	39
2nd place, silver medalist(s)	Wisconsin	39
4	South Carolina	36
5	Florida	35
6	Georgetown	32
7	UCLA	24
8	Pittsburgh	23
T9	Nebraska	20
T9	Villanova	20
