= 2002 NCAA Division I Outdoor Track and Field Championships =

- Edition: 81st (Men); 21st (Women)
- Dates: May 29 – June 1, 2002
- Host city: Baton Rouge, Louisiana; Louisiana State University
- Venue: Bernie Moore Track Stadium

The 2002 NCAA Division I Outdoor Track and Field Championships were contested at the 81st annual NCAA-sanctioned track meet to determine the individual and team champions of men's and women's Division I collegiate track and field in the United States.

This year's championships, the 21st event for both men and women, were held May 29 – June 1, 2002 at the Bernie Moore Track Stadium at Louisiana State University in Baton Rouge, Louisiana.

Hosts LSU won the men's title, the Tigers' fourth and first since 1990.

South Carolina won the women's title, the Gamecocks' first team championship.

== Team results ==
- Note: Top 10 only
- (H) = Hosts
- Full results

=== Men's standings ===
Rank	Team	Points
1st place, gold medalist(s)	LSU	64
2nd place, silver medalist(s)	Tennessee (DC)	57
3rd place, bronze medalist(s)	SMU	42
4	Clemson; Florida	32
6	South Carolina	30
7	Arkansas	28
8	Stanford	26
9	Colorado; Texas	23

=== Women's standings ===
Rank	Team	Points
1st place, gold medalist(s)	South Carolina	82
2nd place, silver medalist(s)	UCLA	72
3rd place, bronze medalist(s)	USC (DC)	57
4	LSU	43
5	Kansas State	30
6	Florida	29
7	Stanford	25
8	North Carolina	22
9	Nebraska	21
10	BYU; Illinois; Texas	19
