= Raimo Pihl =

Swedish decathlete

Personal information
- Nationality: Swedish
- Born: 28 October 1949 (age 76) Suodenniemi, Finland

Sport
- Sport: Athletics
- Event: Decathlon

Raimo Pihl (born 28 October 1949) is a Swedish athlete. He competed in the men's decathlon at the 1976 Summer Olympics. Born in Suodenniemi, Finland, Pihl moved to Sweden with his parents when he was three years old.

Pihl was an All-American decathlete for the BYU Cougars track and field team, winning the decathlon at the 1973 NCAA University Division Outdoor Track and Field Championships and 1975 NCAA Division I Outdoor Track and Field Championships.
