= 1967 NCAA University Division outdoor track and field championships =

Coordinates: 40.258°N 111.655°W

1967 NCAA University Division Outdoor Track and Field Championships
- Team Champions: USC (24th title)
- Edition: 46th
- Dates: June 15−17, 1967
- Host city: Provo, Utah
- Venue: Cougar Stadium; Brigham Young University

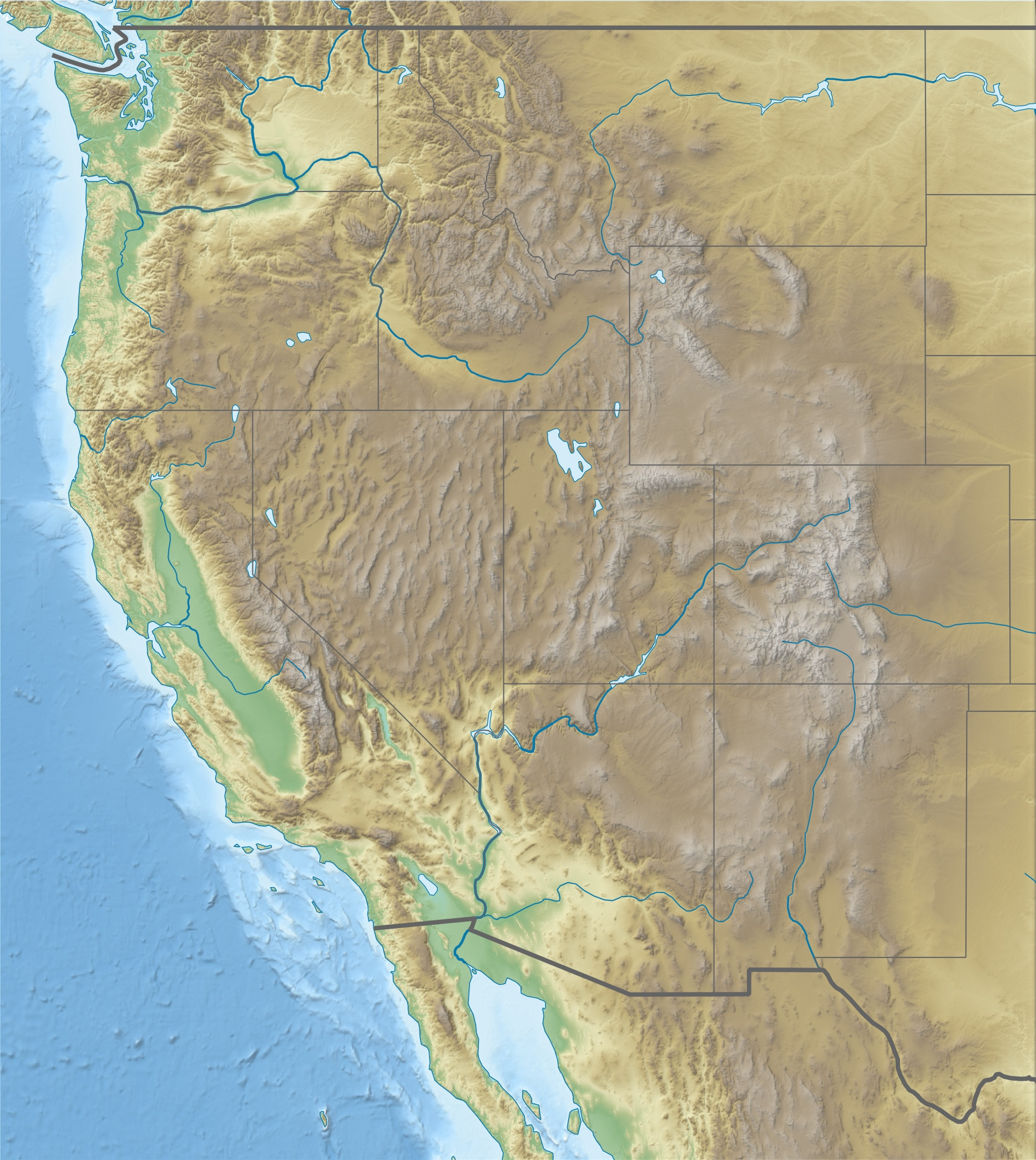
Location in the western United States
Location in Utah

The 1967 NCAA University Division Outdoor Track and Field Championships were contested June 15−17 at the 46th annual NCAA-sanctioned track meet to determine the individual and team national champions of men's collegiate University Division outdoor track and field events in the United States.

This year's outdoor meet was hosted by Brigham Young University at Cougar Stadium in Provo, Utah. The approximate elevation of the track was 4,660 feet (1,420 m) above sea level. The championships returned eight years later in 1975; the track was removed from the stadium in 1982.

The USC Trojans of the AAWU (Pacific-8 Conference) finished first in the team standings, capturing their twenty-fourth national title, followed by conference rivals Oregon and UCLA.

== Team result ==
- Note: Top 10 only
- (H) = Hosts

Rank	Team	Points
1st place, gold medalist(s)	USC	86
2nd place, silver medalist(s)	Oregon	40
3rd place, bronze medalist(s)	UCLA	27
4	BYU (H)	26
5	New Mexico; Tennessee	24
6	Iowa; Southern Illinois	22
7	Washington State	21
8	Kansas; Texas A&M	20
9	Rice	18
10	Oregon State	16
