= 2001 NCAA Division I Outdoor Track and Field Championships =

- Edition: 80th (Men); 20th (Women)
- Dates: May 30 – June 2, 2001
- Host city: Eugene, Oregon; University of Oregon
- Venue: Hayward Field

The 2001 NCAA Division I Outdoor Track and Field Championships were contested at the 80th annual NCAA-sanctioned track meet to determine the individual and team champions of men's and women's Division I collegiate track and field in the United States.

This year's championships, the 20th event for both men and women, were held May 30 – June 2, 2001 at Hayward Field at the University of Oregon in Eugene, Oregon.

Tennessee won the men's title, finishing one point ahead of TCU in the cumulative standings.

USC won the women's title, nine points ahead of rivals UCLA.

== Team results ==
- Note: Top 10 only
- (H) = Hosts
- Full results

=== Men's standings ===
Rank	Team	Points
1st place, gold medalist(s)	Tennessee	50
2nd place, silver medalist(s)	TCU	49
3rd place, bronze medalist(s)	Baylor	36.5
4	Stanford	36
5	LSU	32
6	Alabama	31
7	Arkansas; UTEP	30
9	Oregon	27
10	Auburn; Texas A&M	26

=== Women's standings ===
Rank	Team	Points
1st place, gold medalist(s)	USC	64
2nd place, silver medalist(s)	UCLA	55
3rd place, bronze medalist(s)	Arizona	44
4	South Carolina	36
5	Arkansas	31
6	LSU	30
7	Clemson	28
8	Stanford	27
9	Rice	26
10	Texas	25
