= 1997 NCAA Division I Outdoor Track and Field Championships =

- Men's Champion: Arkansas (7th title); Women's Champion: LSU (11th title)
- Edition: 76th (Men); 16th (Women)
- Dates: June 4−7, 1997
- Host city: Bloomington, Indiana
- Venue: Billy Hayes Track; Indiana University

The 1997 NCAA Division I Outdoor Track and Field Championships were contested June 4−7 at Billy Hayes Track at Indiana University in Bloomington, Indiana in order to determine the individual and team national champions of men's and women's collegiate Division I outdoor track and field events in the United States.

These were the 76th annual men's championships and the 16th annual women's championships. This was the Hoosiers' third time hosting the event (and second time hosting in Bloomington−the 1986 event was in Indianapolis) and first since 1986.

In a repeat of the previous five years' results, Arkansas and LSU topped the men's and women's team standings, respectively; it was the Razorbacks' seventh men's team title and the eleventh for the Lady Tigers (who finished just one point ahead of Texas).

This was the sixth of eight consecutive titles for Arkansas. The Lady Tigers, meanwhile, captured their eleventh consecutive title, and, ultimately, the last of the eleven straight titles they claimed between 1987 and 1997.

== Team results ==
- Note: Top 10 only
- (H) = Hosts
- Full results

=== Men's standings ===
Rank	Team	Points
1st place, gold medalist(s)	Arkansas	55
2nd place, silver medalist(s)	Texas	42 1/2
3rd place, bronze medalist(s)	USC	34
4	Oklahoma; UCLA; Wisconsin	31
7	SMU; UTEP	28
9	Minnesota	19 1/2
10	Iowa State	19

=== Women's standings ===
Rank	Team	Points
1st place, gold medalist(s)	LSU	63
2nd place, silver medalist(s)	Texas	62
3rd place, bronze medalist(s)	UCLA	56
4	SMU	34
5	South Carolina	30
6	Florida	29
7	Arizona	26
8	BYU	25
9	Michigan State	24
10	Wisconsin	22
