= 1971 NCAA University Division Outdoor Track and Field Championships =

- Team Champions: UCLA (3rd title)
- Edition: 50th
- Dates: June 17−19, 1971
- Host city: (Washington (state)) Seattle, Washington
- Venue: Husky Stadium; University of Washington

The 1971 NCAA University Division Outdoor Track and Field Championships were contested June 17−19 at the 50th annual NCAA-sanctioned track meet to determine the individual and team national champions of men's collegiate University Division outdoor track and field events in the United States.

This year's outdoor meet was hosted by the University of Washington at Husky Stadium in Seattle.

UCLA topped the team standings, claiming their third team national title.

== Team result ==
- Note: Top 10 only
- (H) = Hosts

Rank	Team	Points
1st place, gold medalist(s)	UCLA	52
2nd place, silver medalist(s)	USC	41
3rd place, bronze medalist(s)	Oregon	38
4	BYU	35
5	Kansas	27
6	UTEP	26
7	California	22
8	Minnesota	20
9	Kent State	18
10	Ohio State	17
