= 1990 NCAA Division I Outdoor Track and Field Championships =

- Men's Champion: LSU (3rd title); Women's Champion: LSU (4th title)
- Edition: 69th (Men); 9th (Women)
- Dates: May 30 − June 2, 1990
- Host city: Durham, North Carolina
- Venue: Wallace Wade Stadium; Duke University

The 1990 NCAA Division I Outdoor Track and Field Championships were contested May 30 − June 2 at Wallace Wade Stadium at Duke University in Durham, North Carolina in order to determine the individual and team national champions of men's and women's collegiate Division I outdoor track and field events in the United States.

These were the 69th annual men's championships and the ninth annual women's championships. This was the Blue Devils' first time hosting the event.

For the second consecutive year, LSU topped both the men's and women's standings; it was the LSU men's team's third team title and the fourth consecutive, as well as fourth overall, for the Lady Tigers. This would go on to be the fourth of LSU's eleven consecutive women's national championships in track and field between 1987 and 1997.

== Team results ==
- Note: Top 10 only
- (H) = Hosts
- Full results

=== Men's standings ===
Rank	Team	Points
1st place, gold medalist(s)	LSU	53
2nd place, silver medalist(s)	Arkansas	36
3rd place, bronze medalist(s)	Baylor	35
4	Florida	33 1/2
5	Oregon	27
6	BYU	25
7	Auburn; George Mason; Southwest Texas State	24
10	UCLA	22

=== Women's standings ===
Rank	Team	Points
1st place, gold medalist(s)	LSU	86
2nd place, silver medalist(s)	UCLA	46
3rd place, bronze medalist(s)	Wisconsin	42
4	Arizona State	34
5	Alabama	29
6	Tennessee	28
7	Indiana	26
8	Florida; Texas; Villanova	25
