= 1988 NCAA Division I Outdoor Track and Field Championships =

- Men's Champion: UCLA (8th title); Women's Champion: LSU (2nd title)
- Edition: 67th (Men); 7th (Women)
- Dates: June 1−4, 1988
- Host city: Eugene, Oregon
- Venue: Hayward Field; University of Oregon

The 1988 NCAA Division I Outdoor Track and Field Championships were contested June 1−4, 1988 at Hayward Field at the University of Oregon in Eugene, Oregon in order to determine the individual and team national champions of men's and women's collegiate Division I outdoor track and field events in the United States.

These were the 67th annual men's championships and the seventh annual women's championships. This was the Ducks' sixth time hosting the event and the first since 1984.

In a repeat of the previous year's result, UCLA and LSU topped the men's and women's team standings, respectively; it was the Bruins' eighth men's team title and the second for the Lady Tigers. LSU's title would ultimately be the second of a record eleven consecutive national championships between 1987 and 1997.

== Team results ==
- Note: Top 10 only
- (H) = Hosts
- Full results

=== Men's standings ===
Rank	Team	Points
1st place, gold medalist(s)	UCLA	82
2nd place, silver medalist(s)	Texas	41
3rd place, bronze medalist(s)	Arkansas	32
4	Texas A&M	28
5	California; LSU	26
7	Illinois; Oregon (H)	25
9	NC State	24
10	Florida	22

=== Women's standings ===
Rank	Team	Points
1st place, gold medalist(s)	LSU	62
2nd place, silver medalist(s)	UCLA	58
3rd place, bronze medalist(s)	Oregon (H)	45
4	Arizona State	40
5	Nebraska	34
6	Alabama	31
7	USC	29
8	Texas	27
9	Stanford	26 1/3
10	Washington	26
