= 100 meters at the NCAA Division I Outdoor Track and Field Championships =

This is a list of the NCAA Division I outdoor champions in the shortest sprint event. Since 1921, the men's 100-yard dash was usually held until 1975, with the exception of the 100 meters being contested in Olympic years starting in 1932. Metrication occurred in 1976, so all subsequent championships (as well as those during some Olympic years before 1976) were at the metric distance. Hand timing was used until 1973, while starting in 1974 fully automatic timing was used. Wind speeds were not consistently recorded until 1963. The women's championships began in 1982.

== Winners ==
Key
y=yards
w=wind aided
A=Altitude assisted

Women's 100 m winners
Year	Athlete	Team	Time (wind)
1982	Merlene Ottey (JAM)	Nebraska Cornhuskers	10.97 (+3.2 m/s) A w
1983	Merlene Ottey (JAM)	Nebraska Cornhuskers	11.04 (+2.4 m/s) w
1984	Randy Givens	Florida State Seminoles	11.06 (+3.7 m/s) w
1985	Michelle Finn	Florida State Seminoles	11.04 (+3.0 m/s) w
1986	Juliet Cuthbert (JAM)	Texas Longhorns	11.27 (+0.1 m/s)
1987	Gwen Torrence	Georgia Bulldogs	11.25 (−0.6 m/s)
1988	Gail Devers	UCLA Bruins	10.86 (+3.0 m/s) w
1989	Dawn Sowell	LSU Lady Tigers	10.78 (+1.0 m/s) A
1990	Esther Jones	LSU Lady Tigers	11.14 (+3.6 m/s) w
1991	Carlette Guidry	Texas Longhorns	10.91 (+5.1 m/s) w
1992	Chryste Gaines	Stanford Cardinal	11.05 (+2.1 m/s) w
1993	Holli Hyche	Indiana State Sycamores	11.14 (+0.4 m/s)
1994	Holli Hyche	Indiana State Sycamores	11.23 (±0.0 m/s)
1995	D'Andre Hill	LSU Lady Tigers	11.11 (+1.2 m/s)
1996	D'Andre Hill	LSU Lady Tigers	11.03 (+1.4 m/s)
1997	Savatheda Fynes (BAH)	Michigan State Spartans	11.04 (−0.5 m/s)
1998	Debbie Ferguson (BAH)	Georgia Bulldogs	10.94 (+4.0 m/s) w
1999	Angela Williams	USC Trojans	11.04 (+1.4 m/s)
2000	Angela Williams	USC Trojans	11.12 (−0.4 m/s)
2001	Angela Williams	USC Trojans	11.05 (+2.9 m/s) w
2002	Angela Williams	USC Trojans	11.29 (−1.1 m/s)
2003	Aleen Bailey (JAM)	South Carolina Gamecocks	11.18 (−0.2 m/s)
2004	Lauryn Williams	Miami Hurricanes	10.97 (+1.0 m/s)
2005	Marshevet Hooker	Texas Longhorns	11.16 (±0.0 m/s)
2006	Amberly Nesbitt	South Carolina Gamecocks	11.34 (−1.2 m/s)
2007	Sherry Fletcher (GRN)	LSU Lady Tigers	11.20 (±0.0 m/s)
2008	Kelly-Ann Baptiste (TTO)	LSU Lady Tigers	11.20 (−0.5 m/s)
2009	Alexandria Anderson	Texas Longhorns	11.20 (−0.5 m/s)
2010	Blessing Okagbare (NGR)	UTEP Miners	10.98 (+2.8 m/s) w
2011	Candyce McGrone	Oklahoma Sooners	11.08 (+1.5 m/s)
2012	English Gardner	Oregon Ducks	11.10 (−1.7 m/s)
2013	English Gardner	Oregon Ducks	10.96 (+0.9 m/s)
2014	Remona Burchell (JAM)	Alabama Crimson Tide	11.25 (−3.4 m/s)
2015	Jenna Prandini	Oregon Ducks	10.96 (+3.1 m/s) w
2016	Ariana Washington	Oregon Ducks	10.95 (+2.6 m/s) w
2017	Mikiah Brisco	LSU Lady Tigers	10.96 (+0.3 m/s)
2018	Aleia Hobbs	LSU Lady Tigers	11.01 (−0.7 m/s)
2019	Sha'Carri Richardson	LSU Lady Tigers	10.75 (+1.6 m/s)
2021	Cambrea Sturgis	North Carolina A&T Aggies	10.74 (+2.2 m/s) w
2022	Julien Alfred (LCA)	Texas Longhorns	11.02 (+0.2 m/s)
2023	Julien Alfred (LCA)	Texas Longhorns	10.72 (+2.3 m/s) w
2024	McKenzie Long (USA)	Ole Miss Rebels	10.82 (+2.2 m/s) w
2025	Samirah Moody (USA)	USC Trojans	11.14 (−1.4 m/s)
2026	Shenese Walker (USA)	Florida State Seminoles	10.88 (±0.0 m/s)

Men's 100 m / 100 yd winners
Year	Athlete	Team	Time (wind)
1921	Leonard Paulu	Grinnell Pioneers	10.0 y
1922	Leonard Paulu	Grinnell Pioneers	9.9 y
1923	Lou Clarke	Johns Hopkins Blue Jays	9.9 y
1924	Not held		
1925	DeHart Hubbard	Michigan Wolverines	9.8 y
1926	Roland Locke	Nebraska Cornhuskers	9.9 y
1927	Fred Alderman	Michigan State Spartans	9.9 y
1928	Claude Bracey	Rice Owls	9.6 y
1929	George Simpson	Ohio State Buckeyes	9.4 y
1930	Frank Wykoff	USC Trojans	9.4 y
1931	Frank Wykoff	USC Trojans	9.6 y
1932	Ralph Metcalfe	Marquette Golden Eagles	10.2
1933	Ralph Metcalfe	Marquette Golden Eagles	9.4 y
1934	Ralph Metcalfe	Marquette Golden Eagles	9.7 y
1935	Jesse Owens	Ohio State Buckeyes	9.8 (−4.0 m/s) y
1936	Jesse Owens	Ohio State Buckeyes	10.2 (+1.2 m/s)
1937	Sam Stoller	Michigan Wolverines	9.7 y
1938	Mozelle Ellerbe	Tuskegee Golden Tigers	9.7 y
1939	Mozelle Ellerbe	Tuskegee Golden Tigers	9.8 y
1940	Norwood "Barney" Ewell	Penn State Nittany Lions	9.6 y
1941	Norwood "Barney" Ewell	Penn State Nittany Lions	9.6 y
1942	Hal Davis	California Golden Bears	9.6 y
1943	Hal Davis	California Golden Bears	10.0 y
1944	Buddy Young	Illinois Fighting Illini	9.7 y
1945	John Van Velzer	Navy Midshipmen	10.1 y
1946	William Mathis	Illinois Fighting Illini	9.6 y
1947	Mel Patton	USC Trojans	9.7 y A
1948	Mel Patton	USC Trojans	10.4
1949	Mel Patton	USC Trojans	9.7 y
1950	Bob Boyd	Loyola Marymount Lions	9.8 y
1951	Art Bragg	Morgan State Bears	9.6 y
1952	Jim Golliday	Northwestern Wildcats	10.4
1953	Willie Williams	Illinois Fighting Illini	9.7 y
1954	Willie Williams	Illinois Fighting Illini	9.5 y
1955	Jim Golliday	Northwestern Wildcats	9.6 y
1956	Bobby Morrow	Abilene Christian Wildcats	10.4 (−2.5 m/s)
1957	Bobby Morrow	Abilene Christian Wildcats	9.4 y
1958	Ira Murchison	Western Michigan Broncos	9.5 y
1959	Charlie Tidwell	Kansas Jayhawks	9.3 (+4.7 m/s) w y
1960	Charlie Tidwell	Kansas Jayhawks	10.2
1961	Frank Budd	Villanova Wildcats	9.4 y w
1962	Frank Budd	Villanova Wildcats	9.4 y w
1963	Larry Questad (Note: According to Track and Field News analysis of a finish-line photo, Harry Carr of Arizona State, assigned the same time as Questad, actually won the race. USTFCCCA notes this in its race report but still lists Questad as the winner.)	Stanford Cardinal	9.7 (−2.7 m/s) A y
1964	Harry Jerome (CAN)	Oregon Ducks	10.1 (+0.9 m/s)
1965	Charles Greene	Nebraska Cornhuskers	9.4 (±0.0 m/s) y
1966	Charles Greene	Nebraska Cornhuskers	9.3 (−1.0 m/s) y
1967	Charles Greene	Nebraska Cornhuskers	9.21 (+1.5 m/s) A y
1968	Lennox Miller (JAM)	USC Trojans	10.1 (+0.9 m/s)
1969	John Carlos	San Jose State Spartans	9.2 (+1.2 m/s) y
1970	Eddie Hart	California Golden Bears	9.4 (−1.0 m/s) y
1971	Harrington Jackson	UTEP Miners	9.5 (−1.4 m/s) y
1972	Warren Edmonson	UCLA Bruins	10.1 (+2.5 m/s) w
1973	Ed Hammonds	Memphis Tigers	9.4 (±0.0 m/s) y
1974	Reggie Jones	Tennessee Volunteers	9.18 (+4.3 m/s) y w
1975	Hasely Crawford (TRI)	Eastern Michigan Eagles	9.35 (−1.1 m/s) A y
1976	Harvey Glance	Auburn Tigers	10.16 (+0.7 m/s)
1977	Harvey Glance	Auburn Tigers	10.22 (−0.1 m/s)
1978	Clancy Edwards	USC Trojans	10.07 (+1.7 m/s)
1979	Jerome Deal	UTEP Miners	10.19 (+1.4 m/s)
1980	Stanley Floyd	Auburn Tigers	10.10 (+1.1 m/s)
1981	Carl Lewis	Houston Cougars	9.99 (+2.6 m/s) w
1982	Stanley Floyd	Houston Cougars	10.03 (+1.9 m/s) A
1983	Emmit King	Alabama Crimson Tide	10.15 (+1.6 m/s)
1984	Sam Graddy	Tennessee Volunteers	10.25 (+1.5 m/s)
1985	Terry Scott	Tennessee Volunteers	10.02 (+2.9 m/s) w
1986	Lee McRae	Pittsburgh Panthers	10.11 (+1.4 m/s)
1987	Ray Stewart (JAM)	TCU Horned Frogs	10.14 (+0.8 m/s)
1988	Joe DeLoach	Houston Cougars	10.03 (+0.4 m/s)
1989	Ray Stewart (JAM)	TCU Horned Frogs	9.97 (+2.4 m/s) A w
1990	Leroy Burrell	Houston Cougars	9.94 (+2.2 m/s) w
1991	Frankie Fredericks (NAM)	BYU Cougars	10.03 (+5.3 m/s) w
1992	Olapade Adeniken (NGR)	UTEP Miners	10.09 (+2.0 m/s)
1993	Michael Green (JAM)	Clemson Tigers	10.09 (+1.7 m/s)
1994	Sam Jefferson	Houston Cougars	10.12 (+3.3 m/s) w
1995	Tim Harden	Kentucky Wildcats	10.05 (+0.5 m/s)
1996	Ato Boldon (TRI)	UCLA Bruins	9.92 (+0.8 m/s)
1997	Obadele Thompson (BAR)	UTEP Miners	10.13 (−0.8 m/s)
1998	Leonard Myles-Mills (GHA)	BYU Cougars	10.20 (+3.1 m/s) w
1999	Leonard Myles-Mills (GHA)	BYU Cougars	9.98 (+1.6 m/s)
2000	Bernard Williams	Florida Gators	10.03 (+1.2 m/s)
2001	Justin Gatlin	Tennessee Volunteers	10.08 (±0.0 m/s)
2002	Justin Gatlin	Tennessee Volunteers	10.22 (−2.7 m/s)
2003	Mardy Scales	Middle Tennessee Blue Raiders	10.25 (+2.0 m/s)
2004	Mardy Scales (Note: The top two were originally Tyson Gay of Arkansas and Michael Frater of Texas Christian University, both given a time of 10.06 with Tyson given the win. However, both positions were later vacated due to NCAA sanctions, leaving the 3rd-placer Mardy Scales as the winner.)	Middle Tennessee Blue Raiders	10.07 (+1.7 m/s)
2005	Walter Dix	Florida State Seminoles	10.21 (−0.4 m/s)
2006	Xavier Carter	LSU Tigers	10.09 (−0.5 m/s)
2007	Walter Dix	Florida State Seminoles	9.93 (±0.0 m/s)
2008	Richard Thompson (TTO)	LSU Tigers	10.12 (+0.8 m/s)
2009	Trindon Holliday	LSU Tigers	10.00 (+1.4 m/s)
2010	Jeff Demps	Florida Gators	9.96 (+2.5 m/s) w
2011	Ngonidzashe Makusha (ZIM)	Florida State Seminoles	9.89 (+1.3 m/s)
2012	Andrew Riley (JAM)	Illinois Fighting Illini	10.28 (−2.3 m/s)
2013	Charles Silmon	TCU Horned Frogs	9.89 (+3.2 m/s) w
2014	Trayvon Bromell	Baylor Bears	9.97 (+1.8 m/s)
2015	Andre De Grasse (CAN)	USC Trojans	9.75 (+2.7 m/s) w
2016	Jarrion Lawson	Arkansas Razorbacks	10.22 (−2.3 m/s)
2017	Christian Coleman	Tennessee Volunteers	10.04 (−2.1 m/s)
2018	Cameron Burrell	Houston Cougars	10.13 (−0.9 m/s)
2019	Divine Oduduru (NGR)	Texas Tech Red Raiders	9.86 (+0.8 m/s)
2020	Canceled due to COVID-19		
2021	Terrance Laird (USA)	LSU Tigers	10.05 (+0.4 m/s)
2022	Joseph Fahnbulleh (LBR)	Florida Gators	10.00 (+0.6 m/s)
2023	Courtney Lindsey (USA)	Texas Tech Red Raiders	9.89 (+1.8 m/s)
2024	Louie Hinchliffe (GBR)	Houston Cougars	9.95 (+0.2 m/s)
2025	Jordan Anthony (USA)	Arkansas Razorbacks	10.07 (+0.7 m/s)
2026	Kanyinsola Ajayi (NGA)	Auburn Tigers	9.72 (+2.2 m/s) w
