= California Golden Bears track and field =

College track and field team

- University: University of California, Berkeley
- Head coach: Robyne Johnson
- Conference: ACC
- Location: Berkeley, California
- Outdoor track: Edwards Stadium
- Nickname: Golden Bears
- Colors: Blue and gold

NCAA Outdoor National Championships
- 1922

The California Golden Bears track and field team is the track and field program that represents University of California, Berkeley. The Golden Bears compete in NCAA Division I as a member of the Atlantic Coast Conference. The team is based in Berkeley, California at the Edwards Stadium.

The program is coached by Robyne Johnson. The track and field program officially encompasses four teams, as the NCAA regards men's and women's indoor track and field and outdoor track and field as separate sports.

Cal won the 1922 NCAA Track and Field Championships, their only NCAA track and field team title. The men originally won the 1970 NCAA University Division Outdoor Track and Field Championships team title, but it was revoked seven months later after Isaac Curtis was controversially deemed academically ineligible.

Triple jumper Sheila Hudson won six NCAA championship titles, the most of any Golden Bear. She is trailed by sprinter Harold Davis with four titles and hammer thrower Camryn Rogers with three.

== Postseason ==
=== AIAW ===
The Golden Bears have had 23 AIAW All-Americans finishing in the top six at the AIAW indoor or outdoor championships.

AIAW All-Americans
Championships	Name	Event	Place
1974 Outdoor	Laura Van Harn	4 × 440 yards relay	6th
1974 Outdoor	Marilyn Neufville	4 × 440 yards relay	6th
1974 Outdoor	Joanne Silverman	4 × 440 yards relay	6th
1974 Outdoor	Lee Wilder	4 × 440 yards relay	6th
1975 Outdoor	Marilyn Neufville	880 yards	4th
1979 Outdoor	Keila Bolton	200 meters	6th
1979 Outdoor	Suzanne Richter	5000 meters	6th
1979 Outdoor	Janice Oehm	10,000 meters	5th
1979 Outdoor	Michelle Hawthorne	400 meters hurdles	5th
1979 Outdoor	Michelle Hawthorne	4 × 110 yards relay	6th
1979 Outdoor	Elaine Parker	4 × 110 yards relay	6th
1979 Outdoor	Kelia Bolton	4 × 110 yards relay	6th
1979 Outdoor	Cindy Banks	4 × 110 yards relay	6th
1980 Outdoor	Alice Trumbly	1500 meters	3rd
1980 Outdoor	Janice Oehm	10,000 meters	6th
1980 Outdoor	Cheryll Hawthorne	Sprint medley relay	4th
1980 Outdoor	Elaine Parker	Sprint medley relay	4th
1980 Outdoor	Connie Culbert	Sprint medley relay	4th
1980 Outdoor	Marian Franklin	Sprint medley relay	4th
1980 Outdoor	Cynthia Banks	Pentathlon	5th
1981 Outdoor	Cynthia Schmandt	3000 meters	5th
1982 Outdoor	Louise Romo	800 meters	1st
1982 Outdoor	Margaret Spotts	1500 meters	4th
1982 Outdoor	Louise Romo	4 × 400 meters relay	2nd
1982 Outdoor	Connie Culbert	4 × 400 meters relay	2nd
1982 Outdoor	Kimberly White	4 × 400 meters relay	2nd
1982 Outdoor	Sally Meinbress	4 × 400 meters relay	2nd
1982 Outdoor	Kristen Engle	Javelin throw	2nd
1982 Outdoor	Kathy Raugust	Pentathlon	1st
1982 Outdoor	Chris Viguie	Pentathlon	4th

=== NCAA ===
As of 2024, a total of 159 men and 31 women have achieved individual first-team All-American status at the men's outdoor, women's outdoor, men's indoor, or women's indoor national championships.

First team NCAA All-Americans
Team	Championships	Name	Event	Place	Ref.
Men's	1922 Outdoor	Harry McDonald	400 meters	2nd	
Men's	1922 Outdoor	Brick Muller	High jump	3rd	
Men's	1922 Outdoor	Ted Treyer	High jump	5th	
Men's	1922 Outdoor	Allen Norris	Pole vault	1st	
Men's	1922 Outdoor	Brick Muller	Long jump	2nd	
Men's	1922 Outdoor	Jack Merchant	Long jump	4th	
Men's	1922 Outdoor	Jack Merchant	Shot put	1st	
Men's	1922 Outdoor	Jack Witter	Shot put	3rd	
Men's	1922 Outdoor	Brick Muller	Discus throw	4th	
Men's	1922 Outdoor	Jack Merchant	Hammer throw	1st	
Men's	1922 Outdoor	Sandy Sorrenti	Javelin throw	3rd	
Men's	1925 Outdoor	Phil Barber	200 meters	4th	
Men's	1925 Outdoor	Ivan Johnson	400 meters	2nd	
Men's	1925 Outdoor	Elmore Boyden	800 meters	5th	
Men's	1925 Outdoor	Oather Hampton	High jump	1st	
Men's	1925 Outdoor	Willard Hill	Pole vault	6th	
Men's	1925 Outdoor	Elmer Gerkin	Shot put	2nd	
Men's	1925 Outdoor	Glenn Dodson	Javelin throw	6th	
Men's	1930 Outdoor	Kenneth Churchill	Javelin throw	1st	
Men's	1931 Outdoor	Kenneth Churchill	Javelin throw	1st	
Men's	1934 Outdoor	Charles Van Tress	Pole vault	3rd	
Men's	1934 Outdoor	Bob Clark	Long jump	2nd	
Men's	1935 Outdoor	Dell Fishback	220 yards hurdles	7th	
Men's	1935 Outdoor	George Anderson	100 meters	3rd	
Men's	1935 Outdoor	Tom Moore	110 meters hurdles	7th	
Men's	1935 Outdoor	George Anderson	200 meters	2nd	
Men's	1935 Outdoor	Jack Mauger	Pole vault	3rd	
Men's	1935 Outdoor	Glenn Randell	Discus throw	8th	
Men's	1935 Outdoor	Glenn Randell	Hammer throw	6th	
Men's	1936 Outdoor	Dell Fishback	220 yards hurdles	7th	
Men's	1936 Outdoor	Archie Williams	400 meters	1st	
Men's	1936 Outdoor	Dell Fishback	400 meters hurdles	6th	
Men's	1936 Outdoor	Greg Stout	400 meters hurdles	7th	
Men's	1936 Outdoor	George Mackey	Shot put	3rd	
Men's	1937 Outdoor	Les Voorhees	3000 meters	6th	
Men's	1937 Outdoor	Arnold Nutting	Long jump	2nd	
Men's	1937 Outdoor	Guy Manuel	Long jump	6th	
Men's	1938 Outdoor	George Anderson	220 yards hurdles	4th	
Men's	1938 Outdoor	Len Spencer	Mile run	6th	
Men's	1938 Outdoor	Arnold Nutting	Long jump	4th	
Men's	1938 Outdoor	Guy Manuel	Long jump	6th	
Men's	1939 Outdoor	Don Watts	400 meters	2nd	
Men's	1939 Outdoor	Keith Monroe	Pole vault	5th	
Men's	1939 Outdoor	Guy Manuel	Long jump	5th	
Men's	1940 Outdoor	Denzil Widel	800 meters	5th	
Men's	1940 Outdoor	Guinn Smith	Pole vault	2nd	
Men's	1940 Outdoor	Herb Michael	Shot put	3rd	
Men's	1940 Outdoor	Barney Wolf	Discus throw	6th	
Men's	1940 Outdoor	Martin Biles	Javelin throw	1st	
Men's	1941 Outdoor	Grover Klemmer	400 meters	3rd	
Men's	1941 Outdoor	Fay Froom	400 meters	6th	
Men's	1941 Outdoor	Clarence Barnes	800 meters	3rd	
Men's	1941 Outdoor	Dick Peter	Mile run	5th	
Men's	1941 Outdoor	Guinn Smith	Pole vault	1st	
Men's	1941 Outdoor	Luther Nichols	Pole vault	3rd	
Men's	1941 Outdoor	Barney Wolf	Discus throw	3rd	
Men's	1941 Outdoor	Martin Biles	Javelin throw	1st	
Men's	1941 Outdoor	Bob Biles	Javelin throw	3rd	
Men's	1942 Outdoor	Harold Davis	100 meters	1st	
Men's	1942 Outdoor	Harold Davis	200 meters	1st	
Men's	1942 Outdoor	Keith Groswird	Pole vault	6th	
Men's	1942 Outdoor	Luther Nichols	Pole vault	6th	
Men's	1942 Outdoor	Bob Biles	Javelin throw	1st	
Men's	1938 Outdoor	Lee Angelich	220 yards hurdles	6th	
Men's	1943 Outdoor	Harold Davis	100 meters	1st	
Men's	1943 Outdoor	Harold Davis	200 meters	1st	
Men's	1943 Outdoor	Ralph Dewey	Mile run	2nd	
Men's	1943 Outdoor	Keith Grosswird	Pole vault	2nd	
Men's	1946 Outdoor	Chuck Hanger	High jump	5th	
Men's	1946 Outdoor	Max Yerxa	Javelin throw	3rd	
Men's	1948 Outdoor	Donnie Anderson	100 meters	2nd	
Men's	1948 Outdoor	Chuck Hanger	High jump	3rd	
Men's	1948 Outdoor	Francis Friedenbach	Javelin throw	2nd	
Men's	1949 Outdoor	Rod Grant	Long jump	5th	
Men's	1949 Outdoor	George Roseme	Javelin throw	4th	
Men's	1950 Outdoor	Donnie Anderson	100 meters	2nd	
Men's	1950 Outdoor	Donnie Anderson	200 meters	2nd	
Men's	1950 Outdoor	Bill Stauffer	3000 meters	8th	
Men's	1950 Outdoor	George Roseme	Javelin throw	4th	
Men's	1951 Outdoor	John White	Javelin throw	2nd	
Men's	1952 Outdoor	John George	100 meters	6th	
Men's	1952 Outdoor	Lon Spurrier	800 meters	3rd	
Men's	1952 Outdoor	Len Simpson	1500 meters	7th	
Men's	1952 Outdoor	Dave Seed	Pole vault	6th	
Men's	1952 Outdoor	George Roseme	Javelin throw	1st	
Men's	1952 Outdoor	Sam Adams	Javelin throw	6th	
Men's	1953 Outdoor	Guy Blackburn	100 meters	5th	
Men's	1953 Outdoor	Lon Spurrier	800 meters	5th	
Men's	1953 Outdoor	Len Simpson	Mile run	3rd	
Men's	1953 Outdoor	Phil Greenwood	Long jump	6th	
Men's	1953 Outdoor	Sam Adams	Discus throw	8th	
Men's	1953 Outdoor	Sam Adams	Javelin throw	5th	
Men's	1954 Outdoor	Lon Spurrier	800 meters	5th	
Men's	1954 Outdoor	Len Simpson	Mile run	7th	
Men's	1954 Outdoor	Lawrence Anderson	Pole vault	1st	
Men's	1954 Outdoor	John Stellern	Shot put	2nd	
Men's	1954 Outdoor	Charles Butt	Shot put	3rd	
Men's	1954 Outdoor	Charles Butt	Discus throw	8th	
Men's	1954 Outdoor	Dick Righter	Javelin throw	5th	
Men's	1955 Outdoor	Dave Seed	Pole vault	8th	
Men's	1956 Outdoor	Leamon King	100 meters	4th	
Men's	1956 Outdoor	Don Bowden	1500 meters	7th	
Men's	1956 Outdoor	Bob House	10,000 meters	2nd	
Men's	1956 Outdoor	Lawrence Anderson	Pole vault	7th	
Men's	1956 Outdoor	John Merchant	Long jump	7th	
Men's	1956 Outdoor	John Kahnert	Shot put	5th	
Men's	1956 Outdoor	Charles Butt	Shot put	7th	
Men's	1957 Outdoor	Leamon King	100 meters	3rd	
Men's	1957 Outdoor	Leamon King	200 meters	2nd	
Men's	1957 Outdoor	Don Bowden	800 meters	1st	
Men's	1957 Outdoor	Bob House	3000 meters	2nd	
Men's	1958 Outdoor	Willie White	100 meters	6th	
Men's	1958 Outdoor	Willie White	200 meters	8th	
Men's	1958 Outdoor	Jack Yerman	400 meters	3rd	
Men's	1958 Outdoor	Maynard Orme	800 meters	5th	
Men's	1958 Outdoor	Don Bowden	Mile run	4th	
Men's	1958 Outdoor	Proverb Jacobs	Shot put	7th	
Men's	1959 Outdoor	Bob Karlsrud	400 meters hurdles	6th	
Men's	1960 Outdoor	Willie White	100 meters	4th	
Men's	1960 Outdoor	Jack Yerman	400 meters	6th	
Men's	1960 Outdoor	Jerry Siebert	800 meters	2nd	
Men's	1960 Outdoor	Eureal Bell	High jump	7th	
Men's	1960 Outdoor	Dick Dailey	High jump	7th	
Men's	1961 Outdoor	Dave Maggard	Shot put	5th	
Men's	1962 Outdoor	Roger Olsen	High jump	1st	
Men's	1962 Outdoor	Gene Johnson	High jump	2nd	
Men's	1962 Outdoor	Dave Maggard	Shot put	4th	
Men's	1963 Outdoor	Roger Olsen	High jump	2nd	
Men's	1963 Outdoor	Todd Gaskill	Triple jump	3rd	
Men's	1963 Outdoor	Matt Baggett	Shot put	6th	
Men's	1963 Outdoor	Don Schmidt	Discus throw	7th	
Men's	1964 Outdoor	Dave Archibald	400 meters	4th	
Men's	1964 Outdoor	Forrest Beaty	400 meters	7th	
Men's	1964 Outdoor	Al Courchesne	4 × 400 meters relay	1st	
Men's	1964 Outdoor	Dave Fishback	4 × 400 meters relay	1st	
Men's	1964 Outdoor	Forrest Beaty	4 × 400 meters relay	1st	
Men's	1964 Outdoor	Dave Archibald	4 × 400 meters relay	1st	
Men's	1964 Outdoor	Gene Johnson	High jump	2nd	
Men's	1964 Outdoor	Roger Olsen	High jump	5th	
Men's	1964 Outdoor	Don Schmidt	Discus throw	3rd	
Men's	1965 Outdoor	Forrest Beaty	400 meters	2nd	
Men's	1965 Outdoor	Dave Archibald	400 meters	3rd	
Men's	1965 Outdoor	Dave Fishback	800 meters	8th	
Men's	1965 Outdoor	Chuck Glenn	4 × 400 meters relay	1st	
Men's	1965 Outdoor	Dave Fishback	4 × 400 meters relay	1st	
Men's	1965 Outdoor	Forrest Beaty	4 × 400 meters relay	1st	
Men's	1965 Outdoor	Dave Archibald	4 × 400 meters relay	1st	
Men's	1965 Outdoor	Bill Carter	High jump	5th	
Men's	1966 Outdoor	Larry Hengl	400 meters	6th	
Men's	1966 Outdoor	Chuck Glenn	4 × 400 meters relay	2nd	
Men's	1966 Outdoor	Mike Shafer	4 × 400 meters relay	2nd	
Men's	1966 Outdoor	Larry Hengl	4 × 400 meters relay	2nd	
Men's	1966 Outdoor	Forrest Beaty	4 × 400 meters relay	2nd	
Men's	1967 Outdoor	Bob Price	3000 meters steeplechase	5th	
Men's	1967 Outdoor	Chuck Glenn	4 × 400 meters relay	4th	
Men's	1967 Outdoor	John Diehl	4 × 400 meters relay	4th	
Men's	1967 Outdoor	Devone Smith	4 × 400 meters relay	4th	
Men's	1967 Outdoor	Larry Hengl	4 × 400 meters relay	4th	
Men's	1967 Outdoor	Greg Miguel	Pole vault	5th	
Men's	1967 Outdoor	Stan Royster	Long jump	6th	
Men's	1968 Indoor	Devonne Smith	800 meters	3rd	
Men's	1968 Outdoor	Paddy McCrary	400 meters hurdles	4th	
Men's	1968 Outdoor	Jim Smith	4 × 400 meters relay	3rd	
Men's	1968 Outdoor	Devone Smith	4 × 400 meters relay	3rd	
Men's	1968 Outdoor	Larry Hengl	4 × 400 meters relay	3rd	
Men's	1968 Outdoor	Pat Weddle	4 × 400 meters relay	3rd	
Men's	1968 Outdoor	Clarence Johnson	High jump	8th	
Men's	1968 Outdoor	Stan Royster	Long jump	4th	
Men's	1969 Outdoor	Bob Waldon	5000 meters	7th	
Men's	1970 Outdoor	Eddie Hart	100 meters	1st	
Men's	1970 Outdoor	Isaac Curtis	100 meters	2nd	
Men's	1970 Outdoor	Isaac Curtis	200 meters	4th	
Men's	1970 Outdoor	Don Couser	4 × 100 meters relay	1st	
Men's	1970 Outdoor	Isaac Curtis	4 × 100 meters relay	1st	
Men's	1970 Outdoor	Dave Masters	4 × 100 meters relay	1st	
Men's	1970 Outdoor	Eddie Hart	4 × 100 meters relay	1st	
Men's	1970 Outdoor	Clarence Johnson	High jump	7th	
Men's	1970 Outdoor	Rich Dunn	Triple jump	2nd	
Men's	1970 Outdoor	Jim Fraser	Triple jump	8th	
Men's	1971 Outdoor	Eddie Hart	100 meters	2nd	
Men's	1971 Outdoor	Eddie Hart	200 meters	3rd	
Men's	1971 Outdoor	Rick Brown	800 meters	2nd	
Men's	1971 Outdoor	John Drew	800 meters	7th	
Men's	1971 Outdoor	Bruce Kennedy	Javelin throw	8th	
Men's	1973 Outdoor	Rick Brown	800 meters	5th	
Men's	1973 Outdoor	Bruce Kennedy	Javelin throw	2nd	
Men's	1974 Outdoor	Rick Brown	800 meters	3rd	
Men's	1975 Outdoor	Sam Strickland	4 × 100 meters relay	2nd	
Men's	1975 Outdoor	Sammy Burns	4 × 100 meters relay	2nd	
Men's	1975 Outdoor	John Nichols	4 × 100 meters relay	2nd	
Men's	1975 Outdoor	Wesley Walker	4 × 100 meters relay	2nd	
Men's	1975 Outdoor	Mike Grasha	4 × 400 meters relay	5th	
Men's	1975 Outdoor	Sammy Burns	4 × 400 meters relay	5th	
Men's	1975 Outdoor	Wesley Walker	4 × 400 meters relay	5th	
Men's	1975 Outdoor	James Robinson	4 × 400 meters relay	5th	
Men's	1976 Outdoor	Paul Wallace	4 × 400 meters relay	3rd	
Men's	1976 Outdoor	Wesley Walker	4 × 400 meters relay	3rd	
Men's	1976 Outdoor	McKinley Mosley	4 × 400 meters relay	3rd	
Men's	1976 Outdoor	James Robinson	4 × 400 meters relay	3rd	
Men's	1976 Outdoor	Larry Hintz	Pole vault	8th	
Men's	1976 Outdoor	Ed Miller	Decathlon	1st	
Men's	1977 Outdoor	Holden Smith	4 × 100 meters relay	5th	
Men's	1977 Outdoor	Wesley Walker	4 × 100 meters relay	5th	
Men's	1977 Outdoor	Paul Wallace	4 × 100 meters relay	5th	
Men's	1977 Outdoor	Keith Taylor	4 × 100 meters relay	5th	
Men's	1978 Outdoor	Mike Marlow	Triple jump	8th	
Men's	1979 Outdoor	Andy Clifford	1500 meters	6th	
Men's	1979 Outdoor	Mike Marlow	Triple jump	4th	
Men's	1979 Outdoor	Dave Steen	Decathlon	5th	
Men's	1980 Outdoor	Dave Steen	Decathlon	4th	
Men's	1981 Outdoor	Larry Cowling	110 meters hurdles	1st	
Men's	1981 Outdoor	Larry Cowling	400 meters hurdles	6th	
Men's	1981 Outdoor	Ross McAlexander	Pole vault	6th	
Men's	1981 Outdoor	Dave Porath	Shot put	3rd	
Men's	1982 Outdoor	Larry Cowling	110 meters hurdles	4th	
Men's	1982 Outdoor	Larry Cowling	400 meters hurdles	2nd	
Men's	1982 Outdoor	Larry Cowling	400 meters hurdles	2nd	
Men's	1982 Outdoor	Lloyd Guss	400 meters hurdles	7th	
Men's	1982 Outdoor	Tom Downs	5000 meters	3rd	
Men's	1982 Outdoor	Jim Scannella	4 × 400 meters relay	5th	
Men's	1982 Outdoor	Lloyd Guss	4 × 400 meters relay	5th	
Men's	1982 Outdoor	Larry Cowling	4 × 400 meters relay	5th	
Men's	1982 Outdoor	David Timmons	4 × 400 meters relay	5th	
Men's	1982 Outdoor	Ross McAlexander	Pole vault	6th	
Women's	1982 Outdoor	Kristen Engle	Javelin throw	8th	
Women's	1983 Outdoor	Louise Romo	1500 meters	7th	
Men's	1984 Outdoor	Tom Downs	5000 meters	5th	
Women's	1984 Outdoor	Louise Romo	800 meters	5th	
Men's	1985 Outdoor	Ken Williams	Triple jump	5th	
Women's	1985 Outdoor	Kirsten O'Hara	5000 meters	6th	
Men's	1986 Outdoor	Atlee Mahorn	200 meters	2nd	
Men's	1986 Outdoor	Kari Nisula	Discus throw	5th	
Men's	1986 Outdoor	Dave Maggard Jr.	Discus throw	6th	
Men's	1986 Outdoor	Jari Matinolli	Hammer throw	5th	
Women's	1986 Outdoor	Louise Romo	800 meters	5th	
Women's	1986 Outdoor	Sheila Hudson	Triple jump	5th	
Men's	1987 Outdoor	Rod Jett	110 meters hurdles	8th	
Men's	1987 Outdoor	Kari Nisula	Discus throw	8th	
Women's	1987 Outdoor	Sheila Hudson	Long jump	2nd	
Women's	1987 Outdoor	Sheila Hudson	Triple jump	1st	
Women's	1987 Outdoor	Kim Kesler	Discus throw	6th	
Men's	1988 Outdoor	Rod Jett	110 meters hurdles	2nd	
Men's	1988 Outdoor	Atlee Mahorn	200 meters	2nd	
Men's	1988 Outdoor	Kari Nisula	Discus throw	1st	
Women's	1988 Outdoor	Kirsten O'Hara	10,000 meters	3rd	
Women's	1988 Outdoor	Sheila Hudson	Triple jump	1st	
Men's	1989 Indoor	Rod Jett	55 meters hurdles	4th	
Women's	1989 Outdoor	Beth Vidakovits	High jump	6th	
Men's	1990 Indoor	Mike Harris	Triple jump	5th	
Women's	1990 Indoor	Sheila Hudson	Long jump	1st	
Women's	1990 Indoor	Sheila Hudson	Triple jump	1st	
Men's	1990 Outdoor	Jeff Rogers	High jump	7th	
Men's	1990 Outdoor	Mike Harris	Triple jump	7th	
Women's	1990 Outdoor	Sabrina Han	10,000 meters	6th	
Women's	1990 Outdoor	Sheila Hudson	Long jump	1st	
Women's	1990 Outdoor	Sheila Hudson	Triple jump	1st	
Men's	1991 Outdoor	Ramon Jimenez-Gaona	Discus throw	2nd	
Men's	1992 Indoor	Brent Burns	Pole vault	4th	
Men's	1992 Outdoor	Brent Burns	Pole vault	2nd	
Men's	1992 Outdoor	Ramon Jimenez-Gaona	Discus throw	2nd	
Women's	1992 Outdoor	Laura Baker	800 meters	7th	
Men's	1993 Outdoor	Ramon Jimenez-Gaona	Discus throw	2nd	
Men's	1993 Outdoor	John Wirtz	Discus throw	7th	
Men's	1993 Outdoor	Chris Huffins	Decathlon	1st	
Men's	1994 Indoor	Richie Boulet	3000 meters	5th	
Men's	1994 Outdoor	Richie Boulet	5000 meters	8th	
Men's	1995 Indoor	Richie Boulet	3000 meters	2nd	
Men's	1995 Indoor	Lee Adkins	Long jump	5th	
Men's	1995 Indoor	Lenards Ozolinish	Triple jump	2nd	
Men's	1995 Outdoor	Lee Adkins	Long jump	7th	
Men's	1995 Outdoor	Len Ozolinsh	Triple jump	3rd	
Women's	1995 Outdoor	Amy Littlepage	Triple jump	8th	
Men's	1996 Outdoor	Richie Boulet	5000 meters	5th	
Men's	1996 Outdoor	Ross Bomben	Decathlon	2nd	
Women's	1996 Outdoor	Amy Littlepage	Triple jump	7th	
Men's	1997 Indoor	Clarence Phelps	Pole vault	6th	
Men's	1997 Outdoor	Clarence Phelps	Pole vault	2nd	
Women's	1997 Outdoor	Magdalena Lewy	5000 meters	3rd	
Women's	1997 Outdoor	Amy Littlepage	Triple jump	7th	
Men's	1998 Outdoor	Travis Nutter	Hammer throw	6th	
Men's	1998 Outdoor	Ross Bomben	Decathlon	4th	
Women's	1998 Outdoor	Elissa Riedy	1500 meters	6th	
Men's	1999 Outdoor	Beven Hart	Decathlon	3rd	
Women's	1999 Outdoor	Kristin Heaston	Shot put	4th	
Men's	2000 Outdoor	Bevan Hart	Decathlon	1st	
Women's	2000 Outdoor	Maria Lopez	Pole vault	8th	
Women's	2000 Outdoor	Jennifer Joyce	Hammer throw	4th	
Women's	2000 Outdoor	Missy Vanek	Heptathlon	3rd	
Women's	2001 Indoor	Dana Lawson	Shot put	3rd	
Men's	2001 Outdoor	Bolota Asmerom	5000 meters	2nd	
Men's	2001 Outdoor	Bubba McClean	Pole vault	5th	
Women's	2001 Outdoor	Maria Lopez	Pole vault	7th	
Men's	2002 Outdoor	Bubba McLean	Pole vault	8th	
Women's	2002 Outdoor	Erin Belger	800 meters	3rd	
Women's	2002 Outdoor	Jennifer Joyce	Hammer throw	7th	
Women's	2004 Indoor	Brooke Meredith	Pentathlon	3rd	
Men's	2004 Outdoor	Teak Wilburn	High jump	7th	
Women's	2004 Outdoor	Brooke Meredith	Heptathlon	5th	
Men's	2005 Outdoor	Paul Teinert	Javelin throw	7th	
Women's	2005 Outdoor	Antonette Carter	200 meters	5th	
Women's	2005 Outdoor	Alysia Johnson	800 meters	6th	
Women's	2005 Outdoor	Antonette Carter	Long jump	7th	
Women's	2006 Indoor	Alysia Johnson	800 meters	3rd	
Men's	2006 Outdoor	Paul Teinert	Javelin throw	5th	
Women's	2006 Outdoor	Alysia Johnson	800 meters	3rd	
Men's	2007 Indoor	David Torrence	Distance medley relay	2nd	
Men's	2007 Indoor	Nestor Solis	Distance medley relay	2nd	
Men's	2007 Indoor	Francis Gadayan	Distance medley relay	2nd	
Men's	2007 Indoor	Kevin Davis	Distance medley relay	2nd	
Men's	2007 Indoor	Ed Wright	High jump	6th	
Women's	2007 Indoor	Alysia Johnson	800 meters	1st	
Women's	2007 Indoor	Cassandra Strickland	Triple jump	6th	
Men's	2007 Outdoor	Ed Wright	High jump	6th	
Women's	2007 Outdoor	Alysia Johnson	800 meters	1st	
Women's	2007 Outdoor	Inika McPherson	High jump	6th	
Women's	2007 Outdoor	Kelechi Anyanwu	Discus throw	1st	
Women's	2007 Outdoor	Carrie Johnson	Hammer throw	6th	
Men's	2008 Indoor	Ed Wright	High jump	7th	
Women's	2008 Indoor	Alysia Johnson	800 meters	3rd	
Men's	2008 Outdoor	Martin Maric	Discus throw	8th	
Women's	2008 Outdoor	Kimyon Broom	4 × 100 meters relay	8th	
Women's	2008 Outdoor	Kandi Bonty	4 × 100 meters relay	8th	
Women's	2008 Outdoor	Kristin Holmes	4 × 100 meters relay	8th	
Women's	2008 Outdoor	Cherrelle Garrett	4 × 100 meters relay	8th	
Women's	2008 Outdoor	Katie Morgan	Pole vault	1st	
Men's	2009 Indoor	Michael Coe	3000 meters	2nd	
Men's	2009 Indoor	Mark Matusak	Distance medley relay	3rd	
Men's	2009 Indoor	Jake Hanson	Distance medley relay	3rd	
Men's	2009 Indoor	Sebastian Sam	Distance medley relay	3rd	
Men's	2009 Indoor	Michael Coe	Distance medley relay	3rd	
Men's	2009 Indoor	Ed Wright	High jump	3rd	
Women's	2009 Indoor	Inika McPherson	High jump	4th	
Men's	2009 Outdoor	Martin Maric	Discus throw	1st	
Men's	2010 Indoor	Mike Morrison	Heptathlon	3rd	
Men's	2010 Outdoor	Mark Matusak	1500 meters	8th	
Men's	2010 Outdoor	Steve Sodaro	3000 meters steeplechase	6th	
Men's	2010 Outdoor	Mike Morrison	Decathlon	2nd	
Men's	2011 Indoor	Mike Morrison	Heptathlon	5th	
Women's	2011 Indoor	Allison Stokke	Pole vault	8th	
Men's	2011 Outdoor	Mike Morrison	Decathlon	1st	
Women's	2011 Outdoor	Kristen Meister	High jump	7th	
Women's	2012 Indoor	Deborah Maier	3000 meters	2nd	
Women's	2012 Indoor	Deborah Maier	5000 meters	2nd	
Men's	2012 Outdoor	Harrison Steed	High jump	8th	
Women's	2012 Outdoor	Deborah Maier	10,000 meters	3rd	
Men's	2013 Indoor	Ray Stewart	60 meters hurdles	8th	
Men's	2014 Indoor	Milan Ristic	60 meters hurdles	6th	
Men's	2015 Outdoor	Walter Jones	Long jump	7th	
Women's	2016 Indoor	Isabella Marten	Triple jump	7th	
Women's	2016 Outdoor	Isabella Marten	Triple jump	7th	
Men's	2017 Indoor	Ashtyn Davis	60 meters hurdles	6th	
Men's	2017 Outdoor	Peter Simon	Shot put	7th	
Men's	2018 Indoor	Ashtyn Davis	60 meters hurdles	3rd	
Men's	2018 Indoor	Tuomas Kaukolahti	Triple jump	5th	
Men's	2018 Indoor	McKay Johnson	Shot put	8th	
Men's	2019 Indoor	Tuomas Kaukolahti	Triple jump	7th	
Men's	2019 Indoor	McKay Johnson	Shot put	8th	
Men's	2019 Outdoor	Tuomas Kaukolahti	Triple jump	8th	
Women's	2019 Outdoor	Camryn Rogers	Hammer throw	1st	
Women's	2021 Indoor	Camryn Rogers	Weight throw	6th	
Women's	2021 Outdoor	Camryn Rogers	Hammer throw	1st	
Women's	2022 Indoor	Camryn Rogers	Weight throw	3rd	
Men's	2022 Outdoor	Mykolas Alekna	Discus throw	2nd	
Men's	2022 Outdoor	Iffy Joyner	Discus throw	4th	
Women's	2022 Outdoor	Camryn Rogers	Hammer throw	1st	
Women's	2022 Outdoor	Anna Purchase	Hammer throw	7th	
Men's	2023 Outdoor	Jeff Duensing	Shot put	8th	
Men's	2023 Outdoor	Mykolas Alekna	Discus throw	3rd	
Women's	2023 Outdoor	Anna Purchase	Hammer throw	3rd	
Men's	2024 Outdoor	Skyler Magula	Pole vault	6th	
Men's	2024 Outdoor	Rowan Hamilton	Hammer throw	1st	

== Olympians ==
Olympic Medalists associated with the Cal track and field program:

Name	Country	Olympiad	Event	Result	Medal
Brutus Hamilton	United States	1920 Antwerp	Decathlon	5937	Silver
Harold Muller	United States	1920 Antwerp	High jump	6–2.75	Silver
Harry Liversedge	United States	1920 Antwerp	Shot put	46–5.25	Bronze
Gus Pope	United States	1920 Antwerp	Discus	138–2	Bronze
Bob Kiesel	United States	1932 Los Angeles	4x100m relay	40.0	Gold
Archie Williams	United States	1936 Berlin	400m	46.5	Gold
Bob Clark	United States	1936 Berlin	Decathlon	7601	Silver
Guinn Smith	United States	1948 London	Pole Vault	14–1.25	Gold
Leamon King	United States	1956 Melbourne	4x100m relay	39.5	Gold
Jack Yerman	United States	1960 Rome	4x400m relay	3:02.2	Gold
Eddie Hart	United States	1972 Munich	4x100m relay	38.19	Gold
Dave Steen	Canada	1988 Seoul	Decathlon	8328	Bronze
Chris Huffins	United States	2000 Sydney	Decathlon	8595	Bronze
Alysia Montaño	United States	2012 London	800m	1:57.93	Bronze
Camryn Rogers	Canada	2024 Paris	Hammer	252–6	Gold
Mykolas Alekna	Lithuania	2024 Paris	Discus	229–6	Silver
Georgia Bell	Great Britain	2024 Paris	1500m	3:52.61	Bronze

== See also ==
- Category:California Golden Bears men's track and field athletes (44)
- Category:California Golden Bears women's track and field athletes (18)
