= Javelin throw at the NCAA Division I Outdoor Track and Field Championships =

This is a list of the NCAA Division I Outdoor Track and Field champions in the javelin throw. Measurements were conducted in imperial distances (feet and inches) until 1975. Metrication occurred in 1976, so all subsequent championships were measured in metric distances. In 1986, international javelin design regulations were changed and the center of gravity of the implement moved forward. As a result, throwing distances were in general shorter, flat landings fewer, and legal throws (tip-down) easier to attain post-1985. The women's event began in 1982.

== Winners ==
Key

Set with original javelin before worldwide specification change

A=Altitude assisted
* = Old javelin

Women's javelin throw winners
Year	Athlete	Team	Distance
1982	Karin Smith	Cal Poly Mustangs	63.02 m (206 ft 9 in)
1983	Denise Thiémard (SUI)	Nebraska Cornhuskers	54.50 m (178 ft 9 in)
1984	Íris Grönfeldt (ISL)	Alabama Crimson Tide	56.14 m (184 ft 2 in)
1985	Íris Grönfeldt (ISL)	Alabama Crimson Tide	57.20 m (187 ft 7 in)
1986	Helena Uusitalo (FIN)	Washington Huskies	58.86 m (193 ft 1 in)
1987	Laverne Eve (BAH)	LSU Lady Tigers	55.60 m (182 ft 4 in)
1988	Jill Smith	Oregon Ducks	55.08 m (180 ft 8 in)
1989	Kim Engel	Georgia Bulldogs	59.94 m (196 ft 7 in)A
1990	Ashley Selman	USC Trojans	56.78 m (186 ft 3 in)
1991	Paula Berry	Oregon Ducks	57.44 m (188 ft 5 in)
1992	Valerie Tulloch (CAN)	Rice Owls	58.26 m (191 ft 1 in)
1993	Ashley Selman	Oregon Ducks	57.44 m (188 ft 5 in)
1994	Valerie Tulloch (CAN)	Rice Owls	57.18 m (187 ft 7 in)
1995	Valerie Tulloch (CAN)	Rice Owls	58.54 m (192 ft 0 in)
1996	Windy Dean	SMU Mustangs	56.72 m (186 ft 1 in)
1997	Windy Dean	SMU Mustangs	58.28 m (191 ft 2 in)
1998	Windy Dean	SMU Mustangs	56.28 m (184 ft 7 in)
1999	Vigdís Gudjónsdóttir (ISL)	Georgia Bulldogs	55.54 m (182 ft 2 in)
2000	Angeliki Tsiolakoudi (GRE)	UTEP Miners	60.24 m (197 ft 7 in)
2001	Inga Stasiulionyté (LTU)	USC Trojans	52.52 m (172 ft 3 in)
2002	Serene Ross	Purdue Boilermakers	59.64 m (195 ft 8 in)
2003	Irina Kharun (UKR)	Indiana Hoosiers	61.82 m (202 ft 9 in)
2004	Katy Doyle	Texas A&M Aggies	56.57 m (185 ft 7 in)
2005	Dana Pounds	Air Force Falcons	56.48 m (185 ft 3 in)
2006	Dana Pounds	Air Force Falcons	58.00 m (190 ft 3 in)
2007	Lindsey Blaine	Purdue Boilermakers	55.56 m (182 ft 3 in)
2008	Rachel Yurkovich	Oregon Ducks	56.57 m (185 ft 7 in)
2009	Rachel Yurkovich	Oregon Ducks	59.62 m (195 ft 7 in)
2010	Evelien Dekkers (NED)	Florida Gators	58.99 m (193 ft 6 1/4 in)
2011	Brittany Borman	Oklahoma Sooners	54.32 m (178 ft 2 in)
2012	Brittany Borman	Oklahoma Sooners	56.27 m (184 ft 7 in)
2013	Freya Jones (GBR)	Georgia Bulldogs	54.95 m (180 ft 3 in)
2014	Fawn Miller	Florida Gators	58.13 m (190 ft 8 in)
2015	Irena Sediva (CZE)	Virginia Tech Hokies	192 ft 9 in (58.75 m)
2016	Maggie Malone	Texas A&M Aggies	62.19 m (204 ft 0 in)
2017	Irena Gillarová (CZE)	Virginia Tech Hokies	58.76 m (192 ft 9 in)
2018	Mackenzie Little (AUS)	Stanford Cardinal	60.36 m (198 ft 0 in)
2019	Mackenzie Little (AUS)	Stanford Cardinal	59.44 m (195 ft 0 in)
2021	Marie-Therese Obst (NOR)	Georgia Bulldogs	59.69 m (195 ft 10 in)
2022	Ashton Riner	BYU Cougars	58.24 m (191 ft 0 in)
2023	Rhema Otabor (BAH)	Nebraska Cornhuskers	59.49 m (195 ft 2 in)
2024	Rhema Otabor (BAH)	Nebraska Cornhuskers	64.19 m (210 ft 7 in)
2025	Valentina Barrios (COL)	Missouri Tigers	62.00 m (203 ft 4 in)
2026	Mckyla van der Westhuizen (RSA)	Rice Owls	60.87 m (199 ft 8 in)

Men's javelin throw winners
Year	Athlete	Team	Distance
1921	Flint Hanner	Stanford Cardinal	58.27 m (191 ft 2 in)*
1922	Howard Hoffman	Michigan Wolverines	61.65 m (202 ft 3 in)*
1923	Harry Frieda	Chicago Maroons	58.37 m (191 ft 6 in)*
1924	not held		
1925	Philip Northrup	Michigan Wolverines	61.54 m (201 ft 10 in)*
1926	Philip Northrup	Michigan Wolverines	61.21 m (200 ft 9 in)*
1927	Doral Pilling (CAN)	Utah Utes	60.86 m (199 ft 8 in)*
1928	Lee Bartlett	Albion Britons	66.01 m (216 ft 6 in)*
1929	Jess Mortensen	USC Trojans	62.07 m (203 ft 7 in)*
1930	Kenneth Churchill (GBR)	California Golden Bears	62.23 m (204 ft 2 in)*
1931	Kenneth Churchill (GBR)	California Golden Bears	65.53 m (214 ft 11 in)*
1932	George Williams	Hampton Pirates	65.53 m (214 ft 11 in)*
1933	Duane Purvis	Purdue Boilermakers	66.00 m (216 ft 6 in)*
1934	Robert Parke	Oregon Ducks	67.35 m (220 ft 11 in)*
1935	Charles Gongloff	Pittsburgh Panthers	67.44 m (221 ft 3 in)*
1936	Alton Terry	Hardin-Simmons Cowboys	68.95 m (226 ft 2 in)*
1937	Lowell Todd	San Jose State Spartans	65.47 m (214 ft 9 in)*
1938	Nick Vukmanic	Penn State Nittany Lions	65.74 m (215 ft 8 in)*
1939	Bob Peoples	USC Trojans	67.22 m (220 ft 6 in)*
1940	Marty Biles	California Golden Bears	62.43 m (204 ft 9 in)*
1941	Marty Biles	California Golden Bears	67.08 m (220 ft 0 in)*
1942	Robert Biles	California Golden Bears	65.17 m (213 ft 9 in)*
1943	George Gast	Iowa State Cyclones	61.61 m (202 ft 1 in)*
1944	Bob Ray	Wisconsin Badgers	53.04 m (174 ft 0 in)*
1945	Robert Patton	Navy Midshipmen	58.24 m (191 ft 0 in)*
1946	Robert Likins	San Jose State Spartans	60.62 m (198 ft 10 in)*
1947	Robert Likins	San Jose State Spartans	63.73 m (209 ft 1 in)A*
1948	Franklin "Bud" Held	Stanford Cardinal	63.91 m (209 ft 8 in)*
1949	Franklin "Bud" Held	Stanford Cardinal	68.48 m (224 ft 8 in)*
1950	Franklin "Bud" Held	Stanford Cardinal	66.06 m (216 ft 8 in)*
1951	Charles Missfeldt	Oregon Ducks	66.87 m (219 ft 4 in)*
1952	George Roseme	California Golden Bears	69.71 m (228 ft 8 in)*
1953	Dick Genther	USC Trojans	66.08 m (216 ft 9 in)*
1954	Leo Long	Stanford Cardinal	69.11 m (226 ft 8 in)*
1955	Les Bitner	Kansas Jayhawks	75.01 m (246 ft 1 in)*
1956	Phil Conley	Caltech Beavers	73.13 m (239 ft 11 in)*
1957	John Fromm	Pacific Lutheran Lutes	75.62 m (248 ft 1 in)*
1958	John Fromm	Pacific Lutheran Lutes	78.36 m (257 ft 1 in)*
1959	Bill Alley	Kansas Jayhawks	73.29 m (240 ft 5 in)*
1960	Bill Alley	Kansas Jayhawks	81.91 m (268 ft 8 in)*
1961	Chuck Wilkinson	Redlands Bulldogs	75.50 m (247 ft 8 in)*
1962	Jan Sikorsky	USC Trojans	76.00 m (249 ft 4 in)*
1963	Frank Covelli	Arizona State Sun Devils	78.55 m (257 ft 8 in)A*
1964	Les Tipton	Oregon Ducks	76.16 m (249 ft 10 in)*
1965	John Tushaus	Arizona Wildcats	76.34 m (250 ft 5 in)*
1966	James Stevenson	Penn State Nittany Lions	78.77 m (258 ft 5 in)*
1967	Delmon McNabb	LSU Tigers	80.29 m (263 ft 5 in)A*
1968	Carl O'Donnell	Washington State Cougars	78.92 m (258 ft 11 in)*
1969	Mark Murro	Arizona State Sun Devils	81.00 m (265 ft 8 in)*
1970	Bill Skinner	Tennessee Volunteers	82.50 m (270 ft 8 in)*
1971	Cary Feldmann	Washington Huskies	78.94 m (258 ft 11 in)*
1972	Rick Dowswell (CAN)	Ohio Bobcats	81.05 m (265 ft 10 in)*
1973	Sam Colson	Kansas Jayhawks	85.27 m (279 ft 9 in)*
1974	Jim Judd	Oregon State Beavers	82.68 m (271 ft 3 in)*
1975	Keith Goldie	Long Beach State Beach	76.25 m (250 ft 1 in)A*
1976	Phil Olsen (CAN)	Tennessee Volunteers	83.26 m (273 ft 1 in)*
1977	Scott Dykehouse	Florida Gators	78.76 m (258 ft 4 in)*
1978	Bob Roggy	Southern Illinois Salukis	86.48 m (283 ft 8 in)*
1979	Tom Sinclair	Washington Huskies	79.64 m (261 ft 3 in)*
1980	Curt Ransford	San Jose State Spartans	82.06 m (269 ft 2 in)*
1981	Mike Juskus	Rowan Profs	83.26 m (273 ft 1 in)*
1982	Brian Crouser	Oregon Ducks	83.72 m (274 ft 8 in)A*
1983	Einar Vilhjálmsson (ISL)	Texas Longhorns	89.34 m (293 ft 1 in)*
1984	Einar Vilhjálmsson (ISL)	Texas Longhorns	89.62 m (294 ft 0 in)*
1985	Brian Crouser	Oregon Ducks	85.66 m (281 ft 0 in)*
1986	Dag Wennlund (SWE)	Texas Longhorns	78.86 m (258 ft 8 in)
1987	Dag Wennlund (SWE)	Texas Longhorns	77.06 m (252 ft 9 in)
1988	Kenneth Petersen (DEN)	Northeast Louisiana Indians	76.56 m (251 ft 2 in)
1989	Patrik Bodén (SWE)	Texas Longhorns	77.82 m (255 ft 3 in)A
1990	Patrik Bodén (SWE)	Texas Longhorns	79.82 m (261 ft 10 in)
1991	Patrik Bodén (SWE)	Texas Longhorns	79.34 m (260 ft 3 in)
1992	Art Skipper	Oregon Ducks	75.78 m (248 ft 7 in)
1993	Erik Smith	UCLA Bruins	79.20 m (259 ft 10 in)
1994	Todd Riech	Fresno State Bulldogs	81.32 m (266 ft 9 in)
1995	Greg Johnson	UCLA Bruins	74.44 m (244 ft 2 in)
1996	Pål Arne Fagernes (NOR)	Arizona State Sun Devils	79.16 m (259 ft 8 in)
1997	Mats Nilsson (SWE)	Alabama Crimson Tide	74.90 m (245 ft 8 in)
1998	Esko Mikkola (FIN)	Arizona Wildcats	81.86 m (268 ft 6 in)
1999	Matti Närhi (FIN)	UTEP Miners	79.74 m (261 ft 7 in)
2000	Esko Mikkola (FIN)	Arizona Wildcats	72.62 m (238 ft 3 in)
2001	John Stiegeler	Oregon Ducks	77.07 m (252 ft 10 in)
2002	Scott Russell (CAN)	Kansas Jayhawks	79.85 m (261 ft 11 in)
2003	Brian Chaput	Pennsylvania Quakers	78.69 m (258 ft 2 in)
2004	Gabriel Wallin (SWE)	Boise State Broncos	80.71 m (264 ft 9 in)
2005	Gabriel Wallin (SWE)	Boise State Broncos	78.76 m (258 ft 4 in)
2006	Justin Ryncavage	North Carolina Tar Heels	74.18 m (243 ft 4 1/4 in)
2007	Justin Ryncavage	North Carolina Tar Heels	73.58 m (241 ft 4 in)
2008	Chris Hill	Georgia Bulldogs	78.41 m (257 ft 3 in)
2009	Chris Hill	Georgia Bulldogs	81.80 m (268 ft 4 in)
2010	Craig Kinsley	Brown Bears	76.29 m (250 ft 3 1/2 in)
2011	Tim Glover	Illinois State Redbirds	80.33 m (263 ft 6 in)
2012	Tim Glover	Illinois State Redbirds	81.69 m (268 ft 0 in)
2013	Sam Humphreys	Texas A&M Aggies	77.95 m (255 ft 8 in)
2014	Sam Crouser	Oregon Ducks	76.98 m (252 ft 6 in)
2015	Sam Crouser	Oregon Ducks	79.19 m (259 ft 9 in)
2016	Curtis Thompson	Mississippi State Bulldogs	77.64 m (254 ft 8 in)
2017	Ioannis Kyriazis (GRE)	Texas A&M Aggies	82.58 m (270 ft 11 in)
2018	Anderson Peters (GRN)	Mississippi State Bulldogs	82.82 m (271 ft 8 in)
2019	Anderson Peters (GRN)	Mississippi State Bulldogs	86.62 m (284 ft 2 in)
2021	Tzuriel Pedigo	LSU Tigers	76.98 m (252 ft 6 in)
2022	Marc Minichello	Penn Quakers	81.17 m (266 ft 3 in)
2023	Tzuriel Pedigo	LSU Tigers	79.79 m (261 ft 9 in)
2024	Marc Minichello	Georgia Bulldogs	80.70 m (264 ft 9 in)
2025	Devoux Deysel (RSA)	Miami Hurricanes	81.75 m (268 ft 2 in)
2026	Nnamdi Prosper Chinecherem (NGA)	Texas A&M Aggies	82.26 m (269 ft 10 in)
