= Ohio Bobcats track and field =

American college track and field team

- University: Ohio University
- Head coach: Sarah Pease
- Conference: MAC
- Location: Athens, Ohio
- Outdoor track: Goldsberry Track
- Nickname: Bobcats
- Colors: Hunter green and white

The Ohio Bobcats track and field team is the track and field program that represents Ohio University. The Bobcats compete in NCAA Division I as a member of the Mid-American Conference. The team is based in Athens, Ohio, at the Goldsberry Track.

The program is coached by Sarah Pease. The track and field program officially encompasses four teams because the NCAA considers men's and women's indoor track and field and outdoor track and field as separate sports.

The men's teams were discontinued following the 2007 season. They were cut as part of an initiative to cut four sports and save US$685,000.

Sprinter Emmett Taylor is the only two-time NCAA champion for the Bobcats, having won the 400 m and 200 m at the 1967 and 1968 outdoor championships respectively. Les Carney was a two-time All-American for the Bobcats and later won the silver medal in the 200 m at the 1960 Summer Olympics.

== Postseason ==
As of August 2025, a total of 17 men and 3 women have achieved individual first-team All-American status for the team at the Division I men's outdoor, women's outdoor, men's indoor, or women's indoor national championships (using the modern criteria of top-8 placing regardless of athlete nationality).

First team NCAA All-Americans
Team	Championships	Name	Event	Place	Ref.
Men's	1936 Outdoor	Paul Halleck	Discus throw	3rd	
Men's	1957 Outdoor	Bob Sawyers	800 meters	8th	
Men's	1958 Outdoor	Les Carney	200 meters	7th	
Men's	1959 Outdoor	Les Carney	200 meters	3rd	
Men's	1962 Outdoor	Darnell Mitchell	800 meters	4th	
Men's	1963 Outdoor	Darnell Mitchell	800 meters	6th	
Men's	1963 Outdoor	Barry Sugden	800 meters	8th	
Men's	1964 Outdoor	Barry Sugden	800 meters	2nd	
Men's	1965 Indoor	Barry Sugden	4 × 800 meters relay	3rd	
Men's	1965 Indoor	John Fox	4 × 800 meters relay	3rd	
Men's	1965 Indoor	Darnell Mitchell	4 × 800 meters relay	3rd	
Men's	1965 Indoor	Bob Crooks	4 × 800 meters relay	3rd	
Men's	1965 Outdoor	Darnell Mitchell	800 meters	3rd	
Men's	1966 Outdoor	John Tillman	800 meters	5th	
Men's	1967 Outdoor	Emmett Taylor	400 meters	1st	
Men's	1967 Outdoor	Roger Pape	4 × 100 meters relay	4th	
Men's	1967 Outdoor	Roger Hosler	4 × 100 meters relay	4th	
Men's	1967 Outdoor	Jerry Rhodes	4 × 100 meters relay	4th	
Men's	1967 Outdoor	Emmett Taylor	4 × 100 meters relay	4th	
Men's	1968 Outdoor	Emmett Taylor	200 meters	1st	
Men's	1968 Outdoor	Roger Hosler	4 × 400 meters relay	2nd	
Men's	1968 Outdoor	Ben Smith	4 × 400 meters relay	2nd	
Men's	1968 Outdoor	Richard Fuller	4 × 400 meters relay	2nd	
Men's	1968 Outdoor	Emmett Taylor	4 × 400 meters relay	2nd	
Men's	1969 Outdoor	Dave Leitch	Hammer throw	6th	
Men's	1969 Outdoor	Don Fish	Javelin throw	4th	
Men's	1970 Outdoor	Bob Bertelsen	10,000 meters	1st	
Men's	1972 Outdoor	Rick Dowswell	Javelin throw	1st	
Men's	1973 Outdoor	Rick Dowswell	Javelin throw	4th	
Men's	1973 Outdoor	Eugene Miller	Decathlon	5th	
Men's	1977 Indoor	James Jeffress	4 × 400 meters relay	5th	
Men's	1977 Indoor	Greg Fuqua	4 × 400 meters relay	5th	
Men's	1977 Indoor	Jessie Young	4 × 400 meters relay	5th	
Men's	1977 Indoor	Bruce Greene	4 × 400 meters relay	5th	
Men's	1977 Outdoor	Bruce Greene	400 meters hurdles	4th	
Men's	1977 Outdoor	Roger Gilders	Pole vault	5th	
Men's	1978 Indoor	Al Ogunfeyimi	Long jump	1st	
Women's	1982 Outdoor	Frances Daniell	High jump	5th	
Women's	1983 Outdoor	Kathy Williams	800 meters	6th	
Women's	1983 Outdoor	Frances Daniell	High jump	6th	
Men's	1988 Indoor	Greg Lones	Shot put	2nd	
Women's	1997 Outdoor	Jackie Conrad	10,000 meters	8th	
Women's	1998 Outdoor	Jackie Conrad	10,000 meters	5th	
Men's	2007 Indoor	Nathan Mayle	Long jump	4th	

== See also ==
- Category:Ohio Bobcats men's track and field athletes (5)
- Category:Ohio Bobcats track and field coaches (3)
