= San Jose State Spartans track and field =

American college track and field team

- University: San Jose State University
- Head coach: Charles Ryan
- Conference: MW
- Location: San Jose, California
- Outdoor track: PAL Stadium
- Nickname: Spartans
- Colors: Gold, white, and blue

NCAA Outdoor National Championships
- Men: 1969

The San Jose State Spartans track and field team, also known as "Speed City", is the track and field program that represents San Jose State University. The Spartans compete in NCAA Division I as a member of the Mountain West Conference. The team is based in San Jose, California, at the PAL Stadium.

The program is currently coached by Charles Ryan. The track and field program officially encompasses four teams because the NCAA considers men's and women's indoor track and field and outdoor track and field as separate sports.

The team was known as "Speed City" in the 1960s under coach Bud Winter. Spartans Tommie Smith and John Carlos were both part of the 1968 Olympics Black Power salute. The San Jose State track team also led the 1968 Black American Olympic boycott movement to advocate for civil rights. A statue, Victory Salute, was erected to honor the moment in 2005, and a History Park exhibit was created about the team in 2007. The men's team was cut in 1988 but revived in 2018.

== Notable athletes ==
=== AIAW ===
The Spartans have had one AIAW All-American finishing in the top six at the AIAW indoor or outdoor championships.

AIAW All-Americans
Championships	Name	Event	Place
1973 Outdoor	Linda Langford	Discus throw	2nd
1973 Outdoor	Linda Langford	Javelin throw	2nd

=== NCAA ===
As of August 2025, a total of 85 men and 3 women have achieved individual first-team All-American status for the team at the Division I men's outdoor, women's outdoor, men's indoor, or women's indoor national championships (using the modern criteria of top-8 placing regardless of athlete nationality).

First team NCAA All-Americans
Team	Championships	Name	Event	Place	Ref.
Men's	1934 Outdoor	Douglas Taylor	Long jump	6th	
Men's	1937 Outdoor	Lowell Todd	Javelin throw	1st	
Men's	1938 Outdoor	Lowell Todd	Javelin throw	5th	
Men's	1946 Outdoor	Bob Likens	Javelin throw	1st	
Men's	1947 Outdoor	Don Smalley	100 meters	6th	
Men's	1947 Outdoor	Thelmo Knowles	800 meters	4th	
Men's	1947 Outdoor	Grant Denmark	Discus throw	5th	
Men's	1947 Outdoor	Bob Likens	Javelin throw	1st	
Men's	1948 Outdoor	Woody Linn	Discus throw	5th	
Men's	1949 Outdoor	Bob Crowe	100 meters	5th	
Men's	1949 Outdoor	Mel Martin	High jump	4th	
Men's	1949 Outdoor	George Mattos	Pole vault	4th	
Men's	1949 Outdoor	Woody Linn	Discus throw	6th	
Men's	1950 Outdoor	George Mattos	Pole vault	2nd	
Men's	1951 Outdoor	George Mattos	Pole vault	2nd	
Men's	1952 Outdoor	Bob McMullen	3000 meters steeplechase	1st	
Men's	1952 Outdoor	Paul Jennings	3000 meters steeplechase	3rd	
Men's	1952 Outdoor	Herm Wyatt	High jump	4th	
Men's	1952 Outdoor	Bill Priddy	Pole vault	1st	
Men's	1953 Outdoor	Lang Stanley	800 meters	1st	
Men's	1954 Outdoor	Lang Stanley	800 meters	4th	
Men's	1955 Outdoor	Owen Rhodes	Pole vault	8th	
Men's	1956 Outdoor	Lang Stanley	800 meters	2nd	
Men's	1956 Outdoor	Don Hubbard	3000 meters steeplechase	4th	
Men's	1956 Outdoor	Owen Rhodes	Pole vault	5th	
Men's	1957 Outdoor	Chuck Hightower	Pole vault	3rd	
Men's	1958 Outdoor	Ray Norton	100 meters	2nd	
Men's	1958 Outdoor	Ray Norton	200 meters	2nd	
Men's	1958 Outdoor	Kent Herkenrath	220 yards hurdles	4th	
Men's	1958 Outdoor	Don Smith	High jump	8th	
Men's	1958 Outdoor	Errol Williams	High jump	8th	
Men's	1958 Outdoor	Chuck Hightower	Pole vault	5th	
Men's	1959 Outdoor	Bob Poynter	100 meters	2nd	
Men's	1959 Outdoor	Ray Norton	200 meters	1st	
Men's	1959 Outdoor	Bob Poynter	200 meters	2nd	
Men's	1959 Outdoor	Sam Holt	3000 meters steeplechase	2nd	
Men's	1959 Outdoor	Errol Williams	High jump	1st	
Men's	1959 Outdoor	Stan Hopkins	Pole vault	6th	
Men's	1959 Outdoor	Al Jongewaard	Hammer throw	4th	
Men's	1959 Outdoor	Tom Daniels	Hammer throw	6th	
Men's	1960 Outdoor	Willie Williams	200 meters	7th	
Men's	1960 Outdoor	Charley Clark	3000 meters steeplechase	1st	
Men's	1960 Outdoor	Errol Williams	High jump	3rd	
Men's	1960 Outdoor	Vance Barnes	High jump	5th	
Men's	1960 Outdoor	Dick Kimmel	Pole vault	2nd	
Men's	1960 Outdoor	Ed Burke	Hammer throw	7th	
Men's	1961 Outdoor	Bob Poynter	100 meters	7th	
Men's	1961 Outdoor	Bob Poynter	200 meters	7th	
Men's	1961 Outdoor	Ron Davis	3000 meters steeplechase	6th	
Men's	1961 Outdoor	Charley Clark	5000 meters	2nd	
Men's	1961 Outdoor	Dick Gear	Pole vault	1st	
Men's	1961 Outdoor	Dick Kimmel	Pole vault	4th	
Men's	1961 Outdoor	Jeff Chase	Pole vault	4th	
Men's	1961 Outdoor	Dan Studney	Javelin throw	6th	
Men's	1962 Outdoor	Dennis Johnson	100 meters	3rd	
Men's	1962 Outdoor	Bruce McCullough	400 meters hurdles	6th	
Men's	1962 Outdoor	Ben Tucker	800 meters	6th	
Men's	1962 Outdoor	Jeff Fishback	3000 meters steeplechase	2nd	
Men's	1962 Outdoor	Ron Davis	3000 meters steeplechase	5th	
Men's	1962 Outdoor	Walt Roberts	Triple jump	8th	
Men's	1962 Outdoor	Ed Burke	Hammer throw	3rd	
Men's	1963 Outdoor	Ben Tucker	Mile run	3rd	
Men's	1963 Outdoor	Jeff Fishback	3000 meters steeplechase	3rd	
Men's	1963 Outdoor	Jeff Fishback	10,000 meters	2nd	
Men's	1963 Outdoor	Danny Murphy	10,000 meters	6th	
Men's	1963 Outdoor	Les Bond	Long jump	7th	
Men's	1964 Outdoor	Wayne Herman	100 meters	8th	
Men's	1964 Outdoor	Wayne Hermen	200 meters	5th	
Men's	1964 Outdoor	John Garrison	800 meters	4th	
Men's	1964 Outdoor	Ben Tucker	1500 meters	4th	
Men's	1964 Outdoor	Gene Gurule	5000 meters	7th	
Men's	1964 Outdoor	Danny Murphy	10,000 meters	1st	
Men's	1964 Outdoor	Gene Gurule	10,000 meters	3rd	
Men's	1964 Outdoor	Les Bond	Long jump	8th	
Men's	1964 Outdoor	Les Bond	Triple jump	2nd	
Men's	1964 Outdoor	Craig Fergus	Triple jump	8th	
Men's	1964 Outdoor	Bob Akers	Discus throw	4th	
Men's	1964 Outdoor	Bob Brown	Javelin throw	5th	
Men's	1965 Outdoor	Wayne Hermen	4 × 100 meters relay	1st	
Men's	1965 Outdoor	Lloyd Murad	4 × 100 meters relay	1st	
Men's	1965 Outdoor	Maurice Compton	4 × 100 meters relay	1st	
Men's	1965 Outdoor	Tommie Smith	4 × 100 meters relay	1st	
Men's	1965 Outdoor	Craig Fergus	Triple jump	2nd	
Men's	1965 Outdoor	Dick Smith	Hammer throw	5th	
Men's	1966 Outdoor	Tommie Smith	100 meters	2nd	
Men's	1966 Outdoor	Wayne Hermen	200 meters	5th	
Men's	1966 Outdoor	Wayne Hermen	4 × 100 meters relay	3rd	
Men's	1966 Outdoor	Tim Knowles	4 × 100 meters relay	3rd	
Men's	1966 Outdoor	John Bambury	4 × 100 meters relay	3rd	
Men's	1966 Outdoor	Tommie Smith	4 × 100 meters relay	3rd	
Men's	1966 Outdoor	Tommie Smith	Long jump	3rd	
Men's	1966 Outdoor	Craig Fergus	Triple jump	1st	
Men's	1967 Outdoor	Tommie Smith	200 meters	1st	
Men's	1968 Outdoor	Sam Davis	100 meters	3rd	
Men's	1968 Outdoor	Lee Evans	400 meters	1st	
Men's	1968 Outdoor	Larry Walls	400 meters hurdles	8th	
Men's	1968 Outdoor	Sam Davis	4 × 100 meters relay	2nd	
Men's	1968 Outdoor	Frank Slaton	4 × 100 meters relay	2nd	
Men's	1968 Outdoor	Bob Griffin	4 × 100 meters relay	2nd	
Men's	1968 Outdoor	Lee Evans	4 × 100 meters relay	2nd	
Men's	1969 Indoor	John Carlos	55 meters	1st	
Men's	1969 Indoor	Kirk Clayton	55 meters	6th	
Men's	1969 Indoor	George Carty	55 meters hurdles	2nd	
Men's	1969 Indoor	Lee Evans	400 meters	2nd	
Men's	1969 Indoor	Sam Caruthers	Pole vault	4th	
Men's	1969 Indoor	Marion Anderson	Long jump	3rd	
Men's	1969 Outdoor	John Carlos	100 meters	1st	
Men's	1969 Outdoor	Ronnie Ray Smith	100 meters	3rd	
Men's	1969 Outdoor	George Carty	110 meters hurdles	7th	
Men's	1969 Outdoor	John Carlos	200 meters	1st	
Men's	1969 Outdoor	Lee Evans	400 meters	2nd	
Men's	1969 Outdoor	Darold Dent	3000 meters steeplechase	7th	
Men's	1969 Outdoor	Sam Davis	4 × 100 meters relay	1st	
Men's	1969 Outdoor	Kirk Clayton	4 × 100 meters relay	1st	
Men's	1969 Outdoor	Ronnie Ray Smith	4 × 100 meters relay	1st	
Men's	1969 Outdoor	John Carlos	4 × 100 meters relay	1st	
Men's	1969 Outdoor	Marion Anderson	Long jump	7th	
Men's	1969 Outdoor	John Powell	Discus throw	4th	
Men's	1971 Outdoor	George Carty	110 meters hurdles	3rd	
Men's	1971 Outdoor	Bob Richards	Pole vault	4th	
Men's	1971 Outdoor	Vic Dias	Pole vault	5th	
Men's	1972 Outdoor	Greg Born	Discus throw	8th	
Men's	1973 Outdoor	Vince Breddell	200 meters	4th	
Men's	1973 Outdoor	Mark Schilling	Mile run	6th	
Men's	1973 Outdoor	Frank Rock	Pole vault	5th	
Men's	1974 Outdoor	Ron Livers	Triple jump	7th	
Men's	1975 Outdoor	Ron Whitaker	200 meters	4th	
Men's	1975 Outdoor	Mark Schilling	Mile run	2nd	
Men's	1975 Outdoor	Ron Livers	High jump	5th	
Men's	1975 Outdoor	Dan Ripley	Pole vault	2nd	
Men's	1975 Outdoor	Ron Livers	Triple jump	1st	
Men's	1976 Outdoor	Dedy Cooper	110 meters hurdles	1st	
Men's	1976 Outdoor	Ron Semkiw	Shot put	2nd	
Men's	1976 Outdoor	Mike Weeks	Shot put	5th	
Men's	1976 Outdoor	Mike Weeks	Discus throw	8th	
Men's	1977 Indoor	Dedy Cooper	55 meters hurdles	2nd	
Men's	1977 Outdoor	Ron Livers	Triple jump	1st	
Men's	1977 Outdoor	Ron Semkiw	Shot put	4th	
Men's	1977 Outdoor	Bob Feuerbach	Shot put	7th	
Men's	1978 Outdoor	Dedy Cooper	110 meters hurdles	8th	
Men's	1978 Outdoor	Ron Livers	Triple jump	1st	
Men's	1978 Outdoor	Bob Feuerbach	Shot put	4th	
Men's	1979 Outdoor	Greg Woepse	Pole vault	5th	
Men's	1979 Outdoor	Curt Ransford	Javelin throw	6th	
Men's	1980 Outdoor	Thurlis Gibbs	High jump	8th	
Men's	1980 Outdoor	Curt Ransford	Javelin throw	1st	
Men's	1981 Outdoor	Cleve Prince	4 × 100 meters relay	5th	
Men's	1981 Outdoor	Ken Thomas	4 × 100 meters relay	5th	
Men's	1981 Outdoor	Dwayne Green	4 × 100 meters relay	5th	
Men's	1981 Outdoor	Virgil Torrence	4 × 100 meters relay	5th	
Men's	1982 Outdoor	Bernie Holloway	400 meters hurdles	4th	
Men's	1983 Indoor	Felix Bohni	Pole vault	1st	
Men's	1983 Outdoor	Felix Bohni	Pole vault	1st	
Men's	1984 Indoor	Felix Bohni	Pole vault	3rd	
Men's	1984 Indoor	Jim Doehring	Shot put	6th	
Men's	1984 Indoor	Kjell Bystedt	Weight throw	5th	
Men's	1984 Outdoor	Jim Doehring	Shot put	6th	
Men's	1984 Outdoor	Kjell Bystedt	Hammer throw	2nd	
Men's	1984 Outdoor	Fred Schumacher	Hammer throw	6th	
Men's	1985 Indoor	Jim Doehring	Shot put	2nd	
Men's	1985 Indoor	Kjell Bystedt	Weight throw	3rd	
Men's	1985 Outdoor	Jim Doehring	Shot put	3rd	
Men's	1985 Outdoor	Kjell Bystedt	Hammer throw	2nd	
Men's	1985 Outdoor	Fred Schumacher	Hammer throw	8th	
Men's	1986 Outdoor	Fred Schumacher	Hammer throw	3rd	
Men's	1987 Indoor	Fred Schumacher	Weight throw	1st	
Women's	2023 Indoor	Emilia Sjöstrand	Triple jump	7th	
Women's	2023 Outdoor	Emilia Sjöstrand	Long jump	7th	
Women's	2024 Indoor	Emilia Sjöstrand	Triple jump	2nd	
Men's	2024 Outdoor	Malachi Snow	110 meters hurdles	4th	
Women's	2024 Outdoor	Emilia Sjöstrand	Triple jump	3rd	
Women's	2025 Indoor	Simone Johnson	Triple jump	8th	
Women's	2025 Outdoor	Sky Hagan	100 meters	5th	
Women's	2025 Outdoor	Emilia Sjöstrand	Triple jump	2nd	

=== Olympics ===
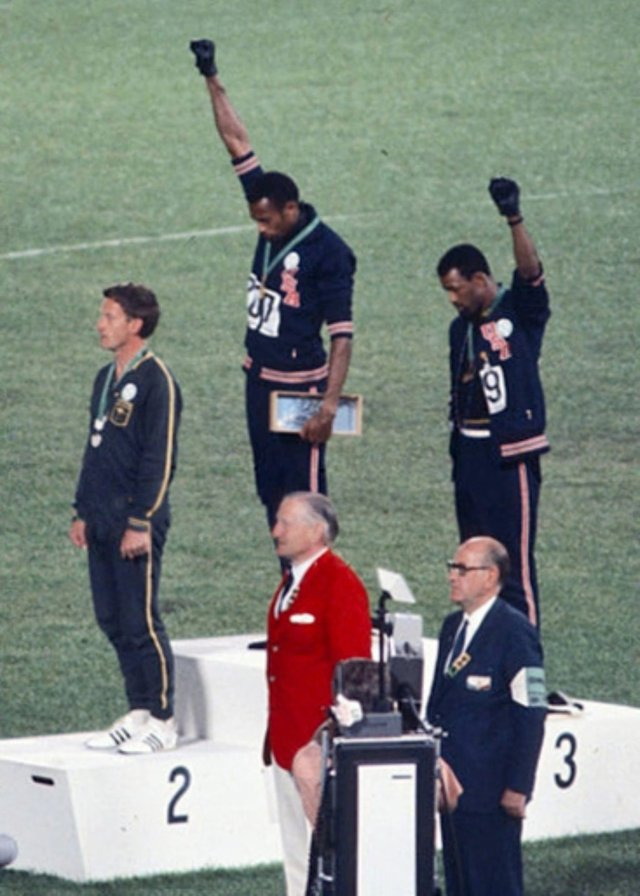
Tommie Smith and John Carlos on the podium of the 1968 Olympics

The Spartans have collectively won nine Olympic track and field medals, from seven athletes.

Olympic medalists
Name	Country	Olympiad	Event	Medal
Willie Steele	United States	1948 London	Long Jump	Gold
Lee Evans	United States	1968 Mexico City	400 meters	Gold
Lee Evans	United States	1968 Mexico City	4×400 meters	Gold
Ronnie Ray Smith	United States	1968 Mexico City	4×100 meters	Gold
Tommie Smith	United States	1968 Mexico City	200 meters	Gold
John Carlos	United States	1968 Mexico City	200 meters	Bronze
John Powell	United States	1976 Montreal	Discus throw	Bronze
John Powell	United States	1984 Los Angeles	Discus throw	Bronze
Jim Doehring	United States	1992 Barcelona	Shot put	Silver

== See also ==
- Category:San Jose State Spartans men's track and field athletes (29)
- Category:San Jose State Spartans women's track and field athletes (4)
