= Brutus Hamilton =

Athletics athlete (1900–1970)

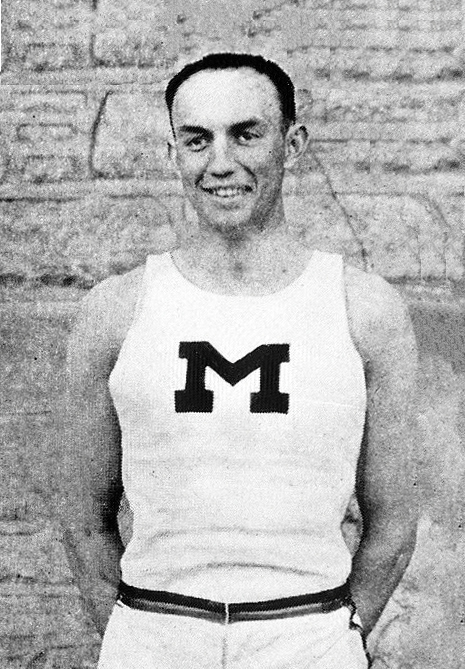
- Brutus Hamilton in 1920

Personal information
- Born: July 19, 1900 Peculiar, Missouri, U.S.
- Died: December 28, 1970 (aged 70) Berkeley, California, U.S.
- Height: 1.83 m (6 ft 0 in)
- Weight: 80 kg (176 lb)

Sport
- Sport: Athletics
- Event: Decathlon
- Club: KCAC, Kansas

Achievements and titles
- Personal best: 5936 (1920)
Medal record
Men's athletics
Representing the United States
Olympic Games
Silver medal – second place	1920 Antwerp	Decathlon

Brutus Kerr Hamilton (July 19, 1900 – December 28, 1970) was an American track and field athlete, coach and athletics administrator.

== Biography ==
Hamilton was born in Peculiar, Missouri, and grew up on a farm next door to the Harry S. Truman family farm. In the Missouri State High School championship meet in 1918, he won the high jump, pole vault, broad jump, and shot put. After that, he went on to the University of Missouri, where he won the U.S. decathlon and pentathlon championships in 1920. This qualified him for the U.S. Olympic team. At the 1920 Summer Olympics he won the silver medal in the decathlon, losing to the Norwegian Helge Løvland by only four points, and finished sixth in the pentathlon. He placed seventh in the pentathlon at the 1924 Summer Olympics.

Besides athletics Hamilton was a second-string end on the 1921 Walter Camp All-American football team, and in 1923 he played on the Kansas City Athletic Club basketball team that won the National AAU Championship.

After the 1924 Olympics, Hamilton coached track and field at Westminster College in Fulton, Missouri, where he also instructed students in English and history. At Westminster, his teams won their conference championships from 1926 to 1929. In 1930, Hamilton moved to the University of Kansas, where his team won the Big Six title in 1930 and 1931 and came in second in 1932. At Kansas he coached the miler Glenn Cunningham and the decathlon world record holder Jim Bausch. In the 1932 Olympics in Los Angeles, Hamilton was the U.S. decathlon coach; Bausch won the gold medal.

Following the 1932 Olympics, Hamilton became coach of the track and field team at the University of California, Berkeley. He coached at Cal from then until his retirement in 1965, with time off to serve as a major in the U.S. Air Intelligence in England during World War II. He was athletic director at Berkeley from 1946 to 1955, during which time he recruited both Lynn (Pappy) Waldorf and Pete Newell, two of Cal's greatest coaches; he was an assistant dean of students; and he chaired the NCAA Track and Field Rules Committee for 10 years.

At Cal, Hamilton coached many athletes of great ability, among them Archie Williams, Hal Davis, Grover Klemmer, Guinn Smith, Jack Yerman, Jerry Siebert, Leamon King, Don Bowden (the first American to break the 4-minute mile barrier), Lon Spurrier, Willie White, Dave Archibald, Forrest Beaty, and Dave Maggard. Maggard eventually replaced him in both positions at Cal. In 1936, when he was for a second time the U.S. decathlon coach, his athletes swept the event and Archie Willams took the gold medal in the 400 meters. In 1952, Hamilton coached the U.S. Olympic track and field team in Helsinki;

He was the U.S. track and field coach for the 1953 Maccabiah Games in Israel. In 1965, he coached the U.S. team in the USA-USSR meet.

Brutus was also a writer and poet, and a collection of his letters was published in 1975.

Brutus Hamilton died in Berkeley, California, on December 28, 1970. In 1974 he was inducted into the National Track and Field Hall of Fame. Earlier in 1950 he was selected as Missouri’s Greatest Amateur Athlete. In 1998, the annual Cal Bears track meet was renamed the Brutus Hamilton Memorial Invitational.
