= Emmett Taylor =

American sprinter

Medal record

Men's Athletics

Representing the United States

Pan American Games
Gold medal – first place	1967 Winnipeg	4x400 metres relay

Emmett Taylor (born January 26, 1947) is an American former sprinter.

Taylor is from Akron, Ohio.

Representing the Ohio Bobcats track and field team, Taylor won the 1967 NCAA University Division Outdoor Track and Field Championships in the 440 yards, and then he won the 1968 NCAA University Division Outdoor Track and Field Championships in the 200 metres.
