= Athletics at the 1974 British Commonwealth Games – Men's javelin throw =

Men's javelin throw at the 1974 British Commonwealth Games
- Venue: Queen Elizabeth II Park
- Dates: 2 February

Medalists
gold medal	Charles Clover	England
silver medal	Dave Travis	England
bronze medal	John Mayaka	Kenya

The men's javelin throw event at the 1974 British Commonwealth Games was held on 2 February at the Queen Elizabeth II Park in Christchurch, New Zealand.

== Results ==
Final result
Rank	Name	Nationality	Distance	Notes
1st place, gold medalist(s)	Charles Clover	England	84.92	GR
2nd place, silver medalist(s)	Dave Travis	England	79.92	
3rd place, bronze medalist(s)	John Mayaka	Kenya	77.56	
4	Rick Dowswell	Canada	73.88	
5	Brian Roberts	England	73.54	
6	Anthony Oyakhire	Nigeria	72.42	
7	Rob Lethbridge	Australia	66.22	
