= Gene Johnson (high jumper) =

American high jumper (born 1941)

Gene Johnson (born March 11, 1941) is a retired male high jumper from the United States, who competed in the 1960s for his native country. He set his personal best in the men's high jump event (2.17 m (7 ft 1 in)) on January 29, 1966, at an indoor meet in Portland.

Johnson was a two-time All American for the California Golden Bears track and field team, finishing runner-up at the 1962 and 1964 NCAA University Division track and field championships.

== Achievements ==
Year	Competition	Venue	Position	Notes
1962	USA Outdoor Track and Field Championships	Walnut, California	2nd	2.08 m (6 ft 10 in)
1963	Pan American Games	São Paulo, Brazil	1st	2.11 m (6 ft 11 in)
1963	USA Outdoor Track and Field Championships	St. Louis, Missouri	1st	2.13 m (7 ft 0 in)
1964	USA Outdoor Track and Field Championships	New Brunswick, New Jersey	6th	2.07 m (6 ft 9 in)
1965	USA Outdoor Track and Field Championships	San Diego, California	4th	2.11 m (6 ft 11 in)
1966	USA Outdoor Track and Field Championships	New York City	6th	2.11 m (6 ft 11 in)
1967	USA Outdoor Track and Field Championships	Bakersfield, California	7th	2.03 m (6 ft 8 in)
