= California Comet =

California Comet may refer to the following:

- Maurice E. McLoughlin (1890-1957), American tennis player.
- Harold Davis (athlete) (1921-2007), American track and field athlete.
- Silky Sullivan (1955-1977), American thoroughbred race horse.
- Swaps (horse) (1952–1972), American thoroughbred race horse.
