= 1964 NCAA University Division track and field championships =

1964 NCAA University Division Track and Field Championships
- Team Champion: Oregon (2nd title)
- Edition: 43rd
- Dates: June 18−20, 1964
- Host city: Eugene, Oregon
- Venue: Hayward Field; University of Oregon

Video on YouTube University of Oregon Highlights]

The 1964 NCAA University Division Track and Field Championships were contested June 18−20 at the 43rd annual NCAA-sanctioned track meet to determine the individual and team national champions of men's collegiate University Division track and field events in the United States.

This year's meet was hosted by the University of Oregon at Hayward Field in Eugene.

Oregon won the team national championship, the Ducks' second title in program history.

== Program changes ==
- Two new events, the 400 meter relay and the 1,600 meter relay, were added to the championship program. The inaugural titles were won by Illinois and California, respectively.

== Team standings ==
- Note: Top 10 only
- (H) = Hosts

Rank	Team	Points
1st place, gold medalist(s)	Oregon (H)	70
2nd place, silver medalist(s)	San José State	40
3rd place, bronze medalist(s)	California; Fresno State; USC	30
4	North Carolina College	28
5	Washington State	19 1/2
6	BYU	17
7	Illinois	16
8	Arizona; Harvard; Northeastern; Rice; Villanova	14
9	Oregon State	13
10	Michigan	12

== Results ==
=== 100 Meters ===
Rank	Name	University	Time	Notes
1st place, gold medalist(s)	Harry Jerome Canada	Oregon	10.1	CR
2nd place, silver medalist(s)	Ed Roberts	North Carolina State	10.1	CR
3rd place, bronze medalist(s)	Trenton Jackson	Illinois	10.1	CR
4	Darel Newnan	Fresno State	10.2	
5	Dick Stebbins	Grambling	10.2	
6	Lynn Headley Jamaica	Nebraska	10.3	

=== 200 Meters ===
wind: +3.4

Rank	Name	University	Time	Notes
1st place, gold medalist(s)	Bob Hayes	Florida A&M	20.4w	
2nd place, silver medalist(s)	Ed Roberts	North Carolina State	20.4w	
3rd place, bronze medalist(s)	Harry Jerome Canada	Oregon	20.6w	
4	Dave Blunt	Oregon	20.7w	
5	Wayne Herman	San Jose State	20.9w	
5	Earl Horner	Villanova	21.0w	

=== 400 Meters ===
Rank	Name	Team	Time
(gold) tie	Bob Tobler; Ulis Williams	Brigham Young; Arizona State	45.9
3rd place, bronze medalist(s)	Kent Bernard Trinidad and Tobago	Michigan	45.9
4	Dave Archibald	California	46.0
5	Bill Boyle	Notre Dame	46.2
6	Nick Lee	Morgan State	46.6
7	Forrest Beaty	California	46.6
8	Don Owen	Grambling	nt

=== 800 Meters ===
Rank	Name	Team	Time
1st place, gold medalist(s)	Thomas Farrell	St. Johns	1:48.5
2nd place, silver medalist(s)	Barry Sugden	Ohio University	1:48.7
3rd place, bronze medalist(s)	Bruce Bess	USC	1:48.9
4	John Garrison	San Jose State	1:49.1
5	Ray Van Asten	Oregon	1:49.2
6	Noel Carroll Ireland	Villanova	1:49.4
7	Dave Perry	Oklahoma State	1:50.1
8	Don Scott	Oregon	nt

=== 1500 Meters ===
Rank	Name	Team	Time	Notes
1st place, gold medalist(s)	Morgan Groth	Oregon State	3:40.4	CR
2nd place, silver medalist(s)	Archie San Romani	Oregon	3:40.8	
3rd place, bronze medalist(s)	John Camien	Emporia State	3:41.0	
4	Ben Tucker	San Jose State	3:41.4	
5	Robin Lingle	Missouri	3:42.0	
6	Bob Day	UCLA	3:42.1	
7	Richard Romo	Texas	3:44.8	

=== 5000 Meters ===
Rank	Name	University	Time	Notes
1st place, gold medalist(s)	James Murphy; Bill Straub	Air Force; Army	14:12.5	CR
3rd place, bronze medalist(s)	Jim Keefe	Central Connecticut	14:13.0	
4	Ken Moore	Oregon	14:14.4	
5	Joe Lynch	Georgetown	14:16.2	
6	Doug Brown	Montana	14:16.2	

=== 10,000 Meters ===
Rank	Name	University	Time	Notes
1st place, gold medalist(s)	Danny Murphy	San Jose State	29:37.8	CR
2nd place, silver medalist(s)	Doug Brown	Montana	29:52.4	
3rd place, bronze medalist(s)	Gene Gurule	San Jose State	29:56.3	
4	John Valiant	Washington State	29:57.2	
5	Jim Keefe	Central Connecticut	30:15.0	
6	Dick Weeks	UCLA	30:19.6	

=== 110-Meter Hurdles ===
Rank	Name	University	Time	Notes
1st place, gold medalist(s)	Bobby May	Rice	13.7	
2nd place, silver medalist(s)	Pete Whitehouse	Notre Dame	14.1	
3rd place, bronze medalist(s)	Norm Johnston	Iowa State	14.2	
4	Theo Viltz	USC	14.2	
5	Cyler Thompson	Houston	14.2	
6	Steve Cortright	Stanford	14.3	

=== 400-Meter Hurdles ===
Rank	Name	Team	Time
1st place, gold medalist(s)	Billy Hardin	LSU	50.2
2nd place, silver medalist(s)	Vincent McArdle	Manhattan College	50.8
3rd place, bronze medalist(s)	Andrew McCray	North Carolina College	50.9
4	Kenneth Reynard	Pennsylvania	51.3
5	Anthony Lynch	Harvard	51.4
6	John Bethea	Morgan State	51:14
7	Boy Burlelon	Pepperdine	51.4
8	Al Hontalbano	Wisconsin	nt

=== 3,000-Meter Steeplechase ===
Rank	Name	Team	Time	Notes
1st place, gold medalist(s)	Vic Zwolak	San Jose State	8:42.0	CR
2nd place, silver medalist(s)	Mike Lehner	Oregon	8:50.6	
3rd place, bronze medalist(s)	Bill Silverberg	Kansas	8:53.4	
4	John Valinat	Washington State	8:57.1	
5	Clayton Steinke	Oregon	9:00.5	
6	Ken Moore	Oregon	9:02.8	
7	Jack Bacheler	Miami	9:03.2	
8	Bruce Mortensen	Oregon	nt	

=== High Jump ===
Rank	Name	Team	Height
1st place, gold medalist(s)	John Rambo	Long Beach State	7 ft 0 1/2 in (2.14 m)
2nd place, silver medalist(s)	Gene Johnson	California	6 ft 10 in (2.08 m)
3rd place, bronze medalist(s)	Bob Keppael	LSU	6 ft 10 in (2.08 m)
4	Chris Pardee	Harvard	6 ft 10 in (2.08 m)
5	Roger Olson	California	6 ft 9 in (2.05 m)
6	Paul Stuber	Oregon	6 ft 9 in (2.05 m)
7	John Harnett	Princeton	6 ft 7 in (2 m)

=== Pole Vault ===
Rank	Name	Team	Height
1st place, gold medalist(s)	John Uelses	LaSalle	16 ft 0 in (4.87 m)
2nd place, silver medalist(s)	Mike Flanagan	USC	15 ft 9 in (4.8 m)
3rd place, bronze medalist(s)	Billy Pembleton	Abilene Christian	15 ft 9 in (4.8 m)
4	Bill Self	Washington State	15 ft 9 in (4.8 m)
5	Rolando Cruz Puerto Rico	Villanova	15 ft 3 in (4.64 m)
6 tie	Preston Hollsinger; Bob Yard	Oklahoma State; Washington State	15 ft 3 in (4.64 m)
8	Bob Neutzling	Ohio State	15 ft 3 in (4.64 m)

=== Long Jump ===
Rank	Name	University	Distance	Notes
1st place, gold medalist(s)	Gayle Hopkins	Arizona	26 ft 9 1/4 in (8.15 m)	CR
2nd place, silver medalist(s)	Sid Nickolas	Fresno State	26 ft 1 in (7.95 m)	
3rd place, bronze medalist(s)	Phil Shinnick	Washington	25 ft 7 1/4 in (7.8 m)	
4	Wellesley Clayton Jamaica	USC	25 ft 0 3/4 in (7.63 m)	
5	Wariboko West Nigeria	Washington	25 ft 7 1/4 in (7.8 m)	
6	Victor Brooks Jamaica	Nebraska	24 ft 1 1/4 in (7.34 m)	

=== Triple Jump ===
Rank	Name	Team	Distance
1st place, gold medalist(s)	Charles Craig	Fresno State	51 ft 8 3/4 in (15.76 m)
2nd place, silver medalist(s)	Lester Bond	San Jose State	50 ft 7 1/4 in (15.42 m)
3rd place, bronze medalist(s)	Norm Tate	North Carolina College	50 ft 3 in (15.31 m)
4	Gayle Hopkins	Arizona	50 ft 2 in (15.29 m)
5	Christian Ohiri Nigeria	Harvard	50 ft 0 in (15.24 m)
6	Bob Daugherty	Tulsa	49 ft 4 1/2 in (15.04 m)
7	Henry Lawson	Sacramento State	48 ft 11 in (14.9 m)

=== Shot Put ===
Rank	Name	Team	Distance
1st place, gold medalist(s)	Gary Gulmor	NYU	61 ft 8 in (18.79 m)
2nd place, silver medalist(s)	George Woods	Southern Illinois	60 ft 4 3/4 in (18.4 m)
3rd place, bronze medalist(s)	Carl Wallin	Northeastern	59 ft 3 in (18.05 m)
4	Mike Berkowitz	Navy	58 ft 9 3/4 in (17.92 m)
5	Don Castle	Southern California	58 ft 6 in (17.83 m)
6	Lee Johnson	Redlands	57 ft 10 1/2 in (17.64 m)
7	Lahoen Samson	Oregon State	57 ft 7 1/2 in (17.56 m)

=== Discus ===
Rank	Team	Members	Distance
1st place, gold medalist(s)	Larry Kennedy	New Mexico	185 ft 2 1/2 in (56.45 m)
2nd place, silver medalist(s)	Bill Neville	Occidental	131 ft 7 1/2 in (40.11 m)
3rd place, bronze medalist(s)	Don Sohmidt	California	175 ft 0 in (53.34 m)
4	Bob Akers	San Jose State	174 ft 9 in (53.26 m)
5	Lloyd Petrozljc	Cal Poly	174 ft 0 1/2 in (53.04 m)
6	Don Hendrickson	Wisconsin	172 ft 11 in (52.7 m)

=== Javelin ===
Rank	Name	Team	Distance
1st place, gold medalist(s)	Les Tipton	Oregon	249 ft 10 1/2 in (76.16 m)
2nd place, silver medalist(s)	Gary Reddaway	Oregon	246 ft 1 in (75 m)
3rd place, bronze medalist(s)	Ron Gomez	Oregon	232 ft 8 1/2 in (70.92 m)
4	Ed Red	Rice	252 ft 6 1/2 in (76.97 m)
5	Bob Brown	San Jose State	229 ft 0 in (69.79 m)
6	Buck Kipe	Washington State	225 ft 2 in (68.63 m)

=== Hammer Throw ===
Rank	Name	University	Time	Notes
1st place, gold medalist(s)	Alex Schulten	Bowdoin	191 ft 6 in (58.36 m)	
2nd place, silver medalist(s)	Bill Crosseti	Northeastern	190 ft 7 in (58.08 m)	
3rd place, bronze medalist(s)	Olney Crossdale	Harvard	189 ft 2 in (57.65 m)	
4	Tom Gage	Cornell	185 ft 10 in (56.64 m)	
5	Warren Sumoski	Connecticut	180 ft 1 in (54.88 m)	
6	George Frenn	Long Beach State	179 ft 5 in (54.68 m)	

=== Decathlon ===
Rank	Name	University	Score	Notes
1st place, gold medalist(s)	Richard Emberger	Roanoke College		
2nd place, silver medalist(s)	Paul Herman	Westmont College		
3rd place, bronze medalist(s)	Russ Hodge	New York Military Academy		
3rd place, bronze medalist(s)	Don Jeisy	Arizona State		
