= Jack Merchant =

American hammer thrower (1899–1972)

Personal information
- Full name: John William Merchant
- Born: May 3, 1899 Marshfield, Oregon, United States
- Died: March 31, 1972 (aged 72) Berkeley, California, United States

Sport
- Sport: Athletics
- Events: Long jump Hammer throw

John William Merchant (May 3, 1899 – March 31, 1972) was an American athlete. He competed in the men's long jump at the 1920 Summer Olympics and the men's hammer throw at the 1924 Summer Olympics.

Competing for the California Golden Bears track and field team, Merchant won the shot put and hammer throw at the 1922 NCAA Track and Field Championships.
