= Gayle Hopkins =

American long jumper

Gayle Patrick Hopkins (November 7, 1941 – March 20, 2016) was an American long jumper who competed in the 1964 Summer Olympics. He was born in Tulsa, Oklahoma.

Competing for the Arizona Wildcats track and field team, Hopkins won the 1964 NCAA Division I Outdoor Track and Field Championships in the long jump.
