= Bruce Kennedy (athlete) =

American javelin thrower

Personal information
- Nationality: Rhodesian/American
- Born: March 25, 1951 (age 74)

Sport
- Sport: Athletics
- Event: javelin throw

Bruce Kennedy (born March 25, 1951) is a Rhodesian, then American track and field athlete known for the javelin throw. He has been dubbed "one of the unluckiest athletes in Olympic history" not because of his failures at the Olympics but due to the political nature of his inability to appear at the Olympics. Born in Southern Rhodesia, he first came to the United States to study at the University of California, Berkeley. He qualified for the Rhodesian team for the 1972 Olympics, but when he arrived in Munich, he was not allowed to take the field. The government of Rhodesia, created when Kennedy was 14 years old, had never been recognized as a legitimate government and its athletes, including Kennedy, were excluded from the Olympics. He made the Rhodesian Olympic team again in 1976, but was not welcome at the Olympics. After eight years in the United States, he was able to obtain American citizenship in 1977 and compete for his new country. He finished second at the 1980 Olympic Trials but by that point in time, President Jimmy Carter had already declared the 1980 Summer Olympics boycott. He was one of 461 athletes to receive a Congressional Gold Medal instead. He was able to attend the 1984 Olympics near his home in Santa Barbara, California, working as an usher.

Kennedy won the American national championships twice, once before he had changed citizenship.

He finished second behind Mike O'Rourke in the javelin throw event at the British 1982 AAA Championships.
