= Emilia Sjöstrand =

Swedish triple jumper (born 2002)

Personal information
- Born: 16 March 2002 (age 24)

Sport
- Sport: Athletics
- Events: Triple jump, Long jump

Achievements and titles
- Personal bests: Triple jump: 14.09m (2024); Long jump: 6.59m (2025)

Emilia Sjöstrand (born 16 March 2002) is a Swedish long jumper and triple jumper. She finished second in the triple jump at the NCAA Indoor Championships. She was selected to compete for Sweden at the 2025 World Athletics Indoor Championships in Nanjing.

== Early life ==
She attended Ostra Reals Gymnasium in Stockholm, Sweden before studding in the United States at San Jose State University in San Jose, California.

== Career ==
=== 2024 ===
In February 2024, competing in Albuquerque, New Mexico, Sjöstrand became the fourth Swede, indoors and outdoors, to clear 14 meters in the triple jump, her 14.09 metres distance was just three centimetres from Camilla Johansson's national indoor record from 2000. She finished in second place in the triple jump final at the 2024 NCAA Indoor Championships in March 2024, with a distance of 13.72 metres.

She qualified for the 2024 NCAA Outdoor Championships in both the long jump and the triple jump. She finished third in the triple jump final and had a top-ten finish in the long jump. She was selected to compete in the triple jump at the 2024 European Athletics Championships in Rome.

=== 2025 ===
In January 2025, she secured first place in the triple jump at the Silver & Blue Invitational with an NCAA Championship standard mark of 13.37 metres. She recorded a triple jump over 14 metres again in March 2025, in Albuquerque, New Mexico. That month, she competed at the NCAA Indoor Championships in both long jump and triple jump.

She was selected to compete for Sweden at the 2025 World Athletics Indoor Championships in Nanjing, China, where she placed eleventh overall with a jump of 13.55 metres.

She was runner-up to Winny Bii in the triple jump at the 2025 NCAA Division I Outdoor Track and Field Championships with a best jump of 13.88 metres.

=== 2026 ===
In August 2026, she competed in the triple jump at the 2026 European Athletics Championships in Birmingham, England.
