= Lonnie Spurrier =

American middle-distance runner and sprinter

Personal information
- Full name: Lonnie Vernon Spurrier
- Born: May 27, 1932 Cass Township, Missouri, U.S.
- Died: June 23, 2015 (aged 83) San Pablo, California, U.S.
- Education: UC Berkeley
- Height: 1.83 m (6 ft 0 in)
- Weight: 72 kg (159 lb)

Sport
- Sport: Athletics
- Event: 400–Mile
- Club: San Francisco Olympic Club

Achievements and titles
- Personal best(s): 440y – 47.2 (1955); 880y – 1:47.5 (1955); Mile – 4:08.4 (1955)
Medal record
Representing the United States
Pan American Games
Silver medal – second place	1955 Mexico City	800 m
Gold medal – first place	1955 Mexico City	4×400 m relay

Lonnie Vernon Spurrier (May 27, 1932 – June 23, 2015) was an American middle-distance runner who competed in the 1956 Summer Olympics and set the world's record in the half-mile in 1955.

Spurrier was born on May 27, 1932, in the rural farming community of Douglas County, Missouri. He was one of six children of John and Golda Spurrier, who migrated to the Central Valley of California during the Dust Bowl, eventually settling in the agricultural town of Delano, about a half-hour north of Bakersfield. Following in the footsteps of his two older brothers, he loved playing sports, and by the time he graduated from Delano High School in 1950 he had established himself as an all-around athlete playing varsity football as halfback, basketball (named outstanding defensive player of the year), and both baseball and track. Lon was also active socially in high school where he was Student Council president and voted by classmates as best all-around senior boy. In his senior year, he was encouraged by his high school coach to switch from baseball to track, where he participated in a wide variety of events. Track proved a natural fit, and by the end of the season he'd set the school record in the low hurdles, and finished 6th place in the CIF California State Meet in the 440, the third time he'd ever ran that distance.

It was at the University of California at Berkeley, under the tutelage of legendary Cal track coach Brutus Hamilton, that Spurrier's newfound interest in track flourished. He won the Pacific Coast Conference 800 title in 1952 and tied for third in the NCAA that year. In 1954, in a remarkable event, he was on one of two college relay teams that broke the 4x880 (2 mile relay) world's record time. The Cal relay team (Al Baeta, Ed Wilson, Len Simpson, and anchored by Spurrier), finished in 2nd place, with a time of 7:28.5, just 1.2 seconds behind the Fordham team. Both teams broke the world's record time that had been previously set by a group of Olympians. He was named an All-American.

On March 26, 1955, on the clay and cinder track at UC Berkeley's Edwards Stadium, Spurrier set the world's record in the half-mile with a time of 1:47.5. Just two weeks earlier, on March 12, 1955, he had won a silver medal in the 800 at the Pan American Games in Mexico City, and ran on the gold medal-winning 4×400 relay team (see Athletics at the 1955 Pan American Games). His coach, Brutus Hamilton, felt that if he could run 1:50.5 at altitude in Mexico City, that Spurrier might be able to break 1:48 at sea level in Berkeley. His hunch proved correct when Spurrier finished at 1:47.5 in Berkeley later that month, breaking the world's record. In 1956, he ran on two world's record setting USA relay teams: the 4 x 440 yard (mile relay), and he anchored the 4 x 880 yard (two-mile relay) record setting team. And, in the 1956 Olympics, Spurrier finished 6th in the 800 meters while also one of six members of the US 1,600 meter relay team that won the gold medal. He was inducted into the Cal Athletic Hall of Fame in 1998.

After graduating from UC Berkeley, he joined the US Air Force, where he earned his wings as a jet pilot and the rank of captain. He attended Harvard Business School, and moved to Manhattan where he began his career in financial management on Wall Street, before returning to the San Francisco Bay Area and making his home in the East Bay.
