= 1952 NCAA track and field championships =

1952 NCAA Track and Field Championships
- Edition: 31st
- Dates: June 13-14, 1952
- Host city: Berkeley, California
- Venue: Edwards Stadium; University of California, Berkeley

The 1952 NCAA Track and Field Championships were contested at the 31st annual NCAA-hosted track meet to determine the team and individual national champions of men's collegiate track and field events in the United States. This year's meet was hosted by the University of California at Edwards Stadium in Berkeley.

USC won their fourth consecutive team national championship, netting the 16th team title in program history.

== Team Result ==
- Note: Top 10 only
- (H) = Hosts

Rank	Team	Points
1st place, gold medalist(s)	Southern California	66 7/12
2nd place, silver medalist(s)	San José State	24 1/3
3rd place, bronze medalist(s)	UCLA	24 1/4
4	Occidental; Stanford	24
5	Illinois; Morgan State	22
6	Michigan	21 1/3
7	Kansas; Oregon	20
8	California (H)	17 1/4
9	Texas A&M	17
10	Georgetown	16

== See also ==
- NCAA Men's Outdoor Track and Field Championship
- NAIA Men's Outdoor Track and Field Championship − first edition held in 1952
- 1951 NCAA Men's Cross Country Championships
