= Les Tipton =

American javelin thrower

Personal information
- Born: March 19, 1942 (age 84) Longview, Washington, United States

Sport
- Sport: Athletics
- Event: Javelin throw

Les Tipton (born March 19, 1942) is an American athlete. He competed in the men's javelin throw at the 1964 Summer Olympics.

Competing for the Oregon Ducks track and field team, Tipton won the 1964 NCAA Division I Outdoor Track and Field Championships in the javelin.
