= Dave Maggard =

Former American Olympian

Dave Maggard (born January 12, 1940) is an American former Olympian and university athletic director.

Maggard, who grew up in San Francisco and Turlock, California, graduated from University of California, Berkeley. He is a former member of the U.S. National Track Team and secured a spot for the 1968 Summer Olympics during the 1968 Olympic Trials. Maggard finished 5th in the shot-put at the 1968 Olympics.

Maggard served as head track coach at Sunset High School in Hayward, California from 1964 to 1966, athletic director at the University of California, Berkeley from 1972 to 1991, the University of Miami from 1991 to 1993, and the University of Houston from 2002 to 2009. He was Managing Director of Sports for the Atlanta Committee for the 1996 Summer Olympics.

His son Dave Maggard Jr. was an All-American discus thrower for the California Golden Bears track and field team, finishing 6th at the 1986 NCAA Division I Outdoor Track and Field Championships.
