= Kenneth Churchill =

American javelin thrower

Personal information
- Born: October 20, 1910 Hollister, California, United States
- Died: October 4, 1980 (aged 69) Hollister, California, United States

Sport
- Sport: Athletics
- Event: Javelin throw

Kenneth Maurice Churchill (October 20, 1910 – October 4, 1980) was an American athlete. He competed in the men's javelin throw at the 1932 Summer Olympics.

Competing for the California Golden Bears track and field team, Churchill won the 1930 NCAA Track and Field Championships and the 1931 NCAA Track and Field Championships in the javelin.
