= Bob Likins =

American javelin thrower

Personal information
- Full name: Robert William Likins
- Nickname: Bob
- National team: USA
- Born: May 12, 1921 Portland, Oregon
- Died: November 21, 1962 (aged 41) Upland, California
- Height: 6 ft 3 in (191 cm)
- Weight: 207 lb (94 kg)

Sport
- Sport: Athletics
- Event: Javelin throw
- University team: San Jose State University

Achievements and titles
- Personal best: JT – 69.01 (226-5) (1948)

Robert William Likins (May 12, 1921 – November 21, 1962) was an American javelin thrower who competed in the 1948 Summer Olympics.

== Life ==
Robert William Likins was born May 12, 1921 in Portland, Oregon. He attended Grant High School, where he played football and threw javelin, becoming a two-time Oregon State Champion in Javelin and set a state record in 1938, and graduated in 1940.

After high school he enrolled at Glendale Junior College, where he set the National Junior College Javelin record. He then transferred to the University of Southern California, but dropped out to serve in World War II. When the war ended he enrolled at San Jose State University, where he would continue to throw javelin. In 1946 and 1947, while competing for San Jose State, Likins won NCAA track and field championships for javelin throwing.

He qualified for and competed in the 1948 Summer Olympics, in London, England. He finished 12th in the qualifying round and 8th in the final.

Later in life, Likins became the athletic director for the Washington State Penitentiary in Walla Walla, Washington. From 1951 to 60 he worked for various Keyser Industries and then was briefly with Arthur Young & Co. until he was forced to retire due to illness.

Likins died on November 21, in Upland, California 1962 at age 41.

In 2010, he was inducted into the Portland Interscholastic League Alumni Sports Hall of Fame.
