= Rick Dowswell =

Canadian javelin thrower (born 1951)

Personal information
- Born: 21 January 1951 (age 75) Sarnia, Ontario, Canada

Sport
- Sport: Athletics
- Event: Javelin throw

Rick Dowswell (born 21 January 1951) is a Canadian athlete. He competed in the men's javelin throw at the 1972 Summer Olympics.

Competing for the Ohio Bobcats track and field team, Dowswell won the 1972 NCAA Division I Outdoor Track and Field Championships in the javelin.
