= Don Bowden =

American middle-distance runner

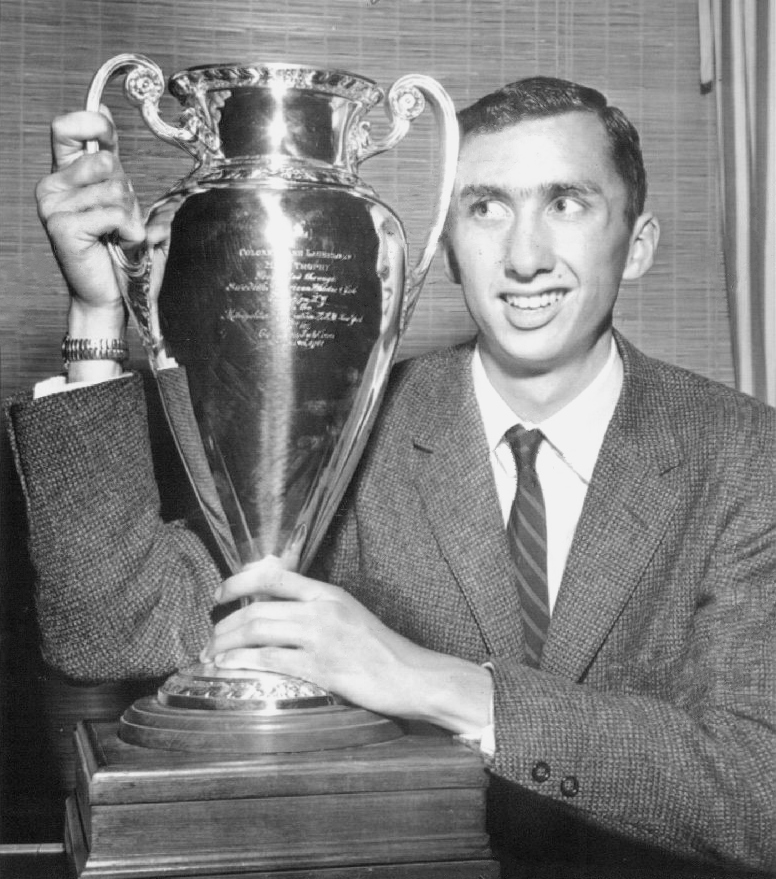
- Bowden in 1957

Personal information
- Born: August 8, 1936 (age 89) San Jose, California, U.S.
- Height: 190 cm (6 ft 3 in)
- Weight: 73 kg (161 lb)

Sport
- Sport: Athletics
- Event: 400 m – mile
- Club: California Golden Bears

Achievements and titles
- Personal bests: 400 m – 47.9 (1957); 880 yd – 1:47.2 (1957); 1500 m – 3:46.5 (1957); Mile – 3:58.7 (1957)

Donald Paul Bowden (born August 8, 1936) is an American middle-distance runner. He competed in the 1500 m at the 1956 Summer Olympics, and in 1957 became the first American to run a mile within four minutes.

At the 1956 Olympics, he failed to reach the final, coming 11th in his qualifying heat. Despite having previously run only a few full mile races, on June 1, 1957, he clocked a 3:58.7, setting a new American record. He also ran on a world-record-setting 4×880 yd team for University of California.

Bowden attended Abraham Lincoln High School in San Jose, California, where he was a star 880 yd runner, winning the state meet in 1953 and 1954. He then entered the University of California, Berkeley, where he again specialized in the 880 yd. After college he helped develop the Tartan track, the first artificial running surface. He was inducted into the National Track and Field Hall of Fame in 2008.
