= 1963 NCAA University Division track and field championships =

1963 NCAA University Division Track and Field Championships
- Team Champion: USC (22nd title)
- Edition: 42nd
- Dates: June 13−15, 1963
- Host city: Albuquerque, New Mexico
- Venue: University Stadium; University of New Mexico

The 1963 NCAA University Division Track and Field Championships were contested June 13−15 at the 42nd annual NCAA-sanctioned track meet to determine the individual and team national champions of men's collegiate track and field events in the United States. This was the first championship help explicitly for teams in the NCAA's University Division (the precursor to present-day Division I); all other programs competed at the newly established NCAA College Division Track and Field Championships. This was also the first meet to be contested over three days, as it was usually a two day meet and in a few cases a one day meet.

This year's meet was hosted by the University of New Mexico at University Stadium in Albuquerque.

USC won the team national championship, the Trojans' twenty-second title in program history.

== Team Result ==
- Note: Top 10 only
- (H) = Hosts

Rank	Team	Points
1st place, gold medalist(s)	USC	61
2nd place, silver medalist(s)	Stanford	42
3rd place, bronze medalist(s)	Oregon	41
4	Arizona State	39
5	Villanova	36
6	Oregon State	29
7	San José State	21
8	Occidental; Southern Illinois	18
9	Washington	17
10	California	15
