= Ulis Williams =

American athlete

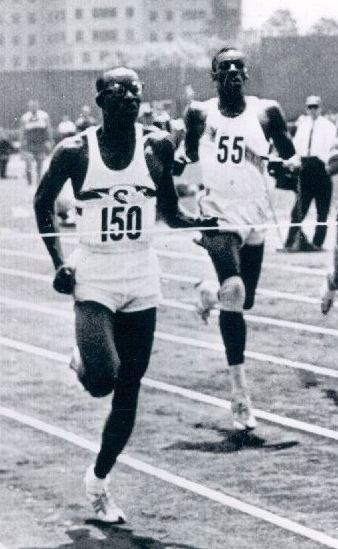
- Williams (left) in 1961

Personal information
- Born: October 24, 1941 (age 84) Hollandale, Mississippi, U.S.
- Height: 183 cm (6 ft 0 in)
- Weight: 75 kg (165 lb)

Sport
- Sport: Athletics
- Events: 200 m, 400 m
- Club: Southern California Striders

Achievements and titles
- Personal bests: 200 m – 21.2 (1962); 400 m – 45.0 (1964)
Medal record
Representing the United States
Olympic Games
Gold medal – first place	1964 Tokyo	4 × 400 m relay

Ulis C. Williams (born October 24, 1941) is an American former athlete, winner of a gold medal in the 4 × 400 meter relay at the 1964 Summer Olympics. He later served as President of Compton Community College in Compton, California, from 1996 to 2005.

Born in Hollandale, Mississippi, Williams won the AAU championships in the 440-yard dash in 1962 and 1963. In 1962, he was named Track and Field News High School Athlete of the Year. After graduating Compton High School, Williams enrolled at Arizona State University and won the NCAA championships in 440 yd in 1963 and 400 m in 1964.

At the Tokyo Olympics, Williams was fifth in 400 m and ran the third leg on the American 4 × 400 m relay team that won the gold medal with a new world record of 3.00.7.

After finishing his athletic career, Williams worked at Compton Community College for almost three decades, serving in numerous positions of increasing responsibility before assuming the post of Superintendent/President in March 1996.
