= 1958 NCAA Track and Field Championships =

- Team Champion: USC (20th title)
- Edition: 37th
- Dates: June 13−14, 1958
- Host city: Berkeley, California
- Venue: Edwards Stadium; University of California, Berkeley

The 1958 NCAA Track and Field Championships were contested June 13−14 at the 37th annual NCAA-sanctioned track meet to determine the individual and team national champions of men's collegiate track and field events in the United States. This year's meet was hosted by the University of California at Edwards Stadium in Berkeley.

USC won the team national championship, the Trojans' 20th team title in program history.

== Team Result ==
- Note: Top 10 only
- (H) = Hosts

Rank	Team	Points
1st place, gold medalist(s)	Southern California	48 6/7
2nd place, silver medalist(s)	Kansas	40 3/4
3rd place, bronze medalist(s)	Villanova	33 3/4
4	San José State	20 3/7
5	Winston-Salem Teachers	20
6	Illinois	17 3/4
7	Ohio State	17
8	Nebraska; Utah State	14
9	California (H)	13
10	Indiana; Manhattan; Texas; Western Michigan	12

== See also ==
- NCAA Men's Outdoor Track and Field Championship
- 1957 NCAA Men's Cross Country Championships
