= 1950 NCAA track and field championships =

1950 NCAA Track and Field Championships
- Edition: 29th
- Dates: June 16-17, 1950
- Host city: Minneapolis, Minnesota
- Venue: Memorial Stadium

The 1950 NCAA Track and Field Championships were contested at the 29th annual NCAA-hosted track meet to determine the team and individual national champions of men's collegiate track and field events in the United States. This year's meet was hosted by the University of Minnesota at Memorial Stadium in Minneapolis.

USC repeated as team national champions, claiming their 14th title.

== Team Result ==
- Note: Top 10 only
- (H) = Hosts

Rank	Team	Points
1st place, gold medalist(s)	Southern California	49 1/5
2nd place, silver medalist(s)	Stanford	28
3rd place, bronze medalist(s)	Yale	27
4	North Carolina	22
5	California; Morgan State	20
6	Rice	18
7	Occidental	17
8	San Diego	14 1/3
9	Texas	14
10	Kansas State; Michigan State	13

== See also ==
- NCAA Men's Outdoor Track and Field Championship
- 1949 NCAA Men's Cross Country Championships
