= Forrest Beaty =

American sprinter (born 1944)

Forrest Orren Beaty (born September 5, 1944) is a retired American track and field athlete memorable for setting the National High School record in the straight 220 yard dash, a race slightly longer than the 200 metres straight. It is the longest standing record on the books, although mostly because that distance is not run anymore. His record time, set on a cinder track in 1961 as a high school junior at Herbert Hoover High School in Glendale, California was hand timed at 20.2 and equaled the world record for the imperially measured distance. Later in his high school career, he also set the record for the 100-yard dash at 9.4, just .2 off the world record in that event. He was also spectacular on the football field for the school. He won both races at the CIF California State Meet (coming out of the tunnel at East Los Angeles College) in 1961, repeating in the 100y in 1962. He was named the CIF Southern Section Athlete of the Year in 1962, the same award he shared with future Olympic Champion Ulis Williams in 1961. He was also Track and Field News High School Athlete of the year in 1962.

After graduating, Beaty ran for the University of California, Berkeley, and was part of their NCAA Men's Outdoor Track and Field Championship mile relay team in 1964 and repeated in 1965. His hand-timed, converted 440 yard time, which equalled Grover Klemmer's former world record is still ranked tied for the #3 time on the school's all time list. He also briefly played football as a running back, gaining all of 4 yards in four attempts. He participated in the 1964 Olympic Trials, in the 400 meters, failing to qualify. Rather than pursuing his career in the sport, he focused on his medical education at the University of California, San Francisco. After serving residency with the United States Navy, Beaty established his practice in Forestville, California. He contributed to writing a medical guide "End-of-life-care: A Practical Guide."

Awards
Preceded by Tom Sullivan and Ulis Williams	Track & Field News High School Boys Athlete of the Year; 1962	Succeeded by Randy Matson
