= 1968 NCAA University Division outdoor track and field championships =

1968 NCAA University Division Outdoor Track and Field Championships
- Team Champions: USC (25th title)
- Edition: 47th
- Dates: June 13−15, 1968
- Host city: Berkeley, California
- Venue: Edwards Stadium; University of California
- Events: 20

The 1968 NCAA University Division Outdoor Track and Field Championships were contested June 13−15 at the 47th annual NCAA-sanctioned track meet to determine the individual and team national champions of men's collegiate University Division outdoor track and field events in the United States.

This year's outdoor meet was hosted by the University of California at Edwards Stadium in Berkeley.

USC edged out Washington State by one point in the team standings to claim their twenty-fifth national title.

== Team result ==
- Note: Top 10 only
- (H) = Hosts

Rank	Team	Points
1st place, gold medalist(s)	USC	58
2nd place, silver medalist(s)	Washington State	57
3rd place, bronze medalist(s)	Villanova	41
4	BYU	31
5	UCLA	30
6	Oregon State	26
7	San José State	24
8	Ohio	18
9	UTEP	17
10	California (H); Stanford	14
