= NCAA Division I Outdoor Track and Field Championships =

NCAA Division I Outdoor Track and Field Championships may refer to:

- NCAA Division I Men's Outdoor Track and Field Championships
- NCAA Division I Women's Outdoor Track and Field Championships
