= 1953 NCAA track and field championships =

1953 NCAA Track and Field Championships
- Edition: 32nd
- Dates: June 19−20, 1953
- Host city: Lincoln, Nebraska; University of Nebraska
- Venue: Memorial Stadium

The 1953 NCAA Track and Field Championships were contested June 19−20, 1953 at the 32nd annual NCAA-sanctioned track meet to determine the team and individual national champions of men's collegiate track and field in the United States. This year's events were hosted by the University of Nebraska at Memorial Stadium in Lincoln, Nebraska.

USC won their fifth consecutive team national championship, the Trojans' 17th team title in program history.

== Team result ==
- Note: Top 10 finishers only
- (H) = Hosts

Rank	Team	Points
1st place, gold medalist(s)	USC	80
2nd place, silver medalist(s)	Illinois	41
3rd place, bronze medalist(s)	Fresno State; Stanford	22
4	Texas A&M	18 3/5
5	Kansas; Kansas State; Michigan	18
6	California	13
7	UCLA	12 3/5
8	Georgetown; Marquette	12
9	Iowa; San José State	10
10	Penn State; Washington State	8 3/5

== See also ==
- NCAA Men's Outdoor Track and Field Championship
- 1952 NCAA Men's Cross Country Championships
