= 1938 NCAA track and field championships =

1938 NCAA Track and Field Championships
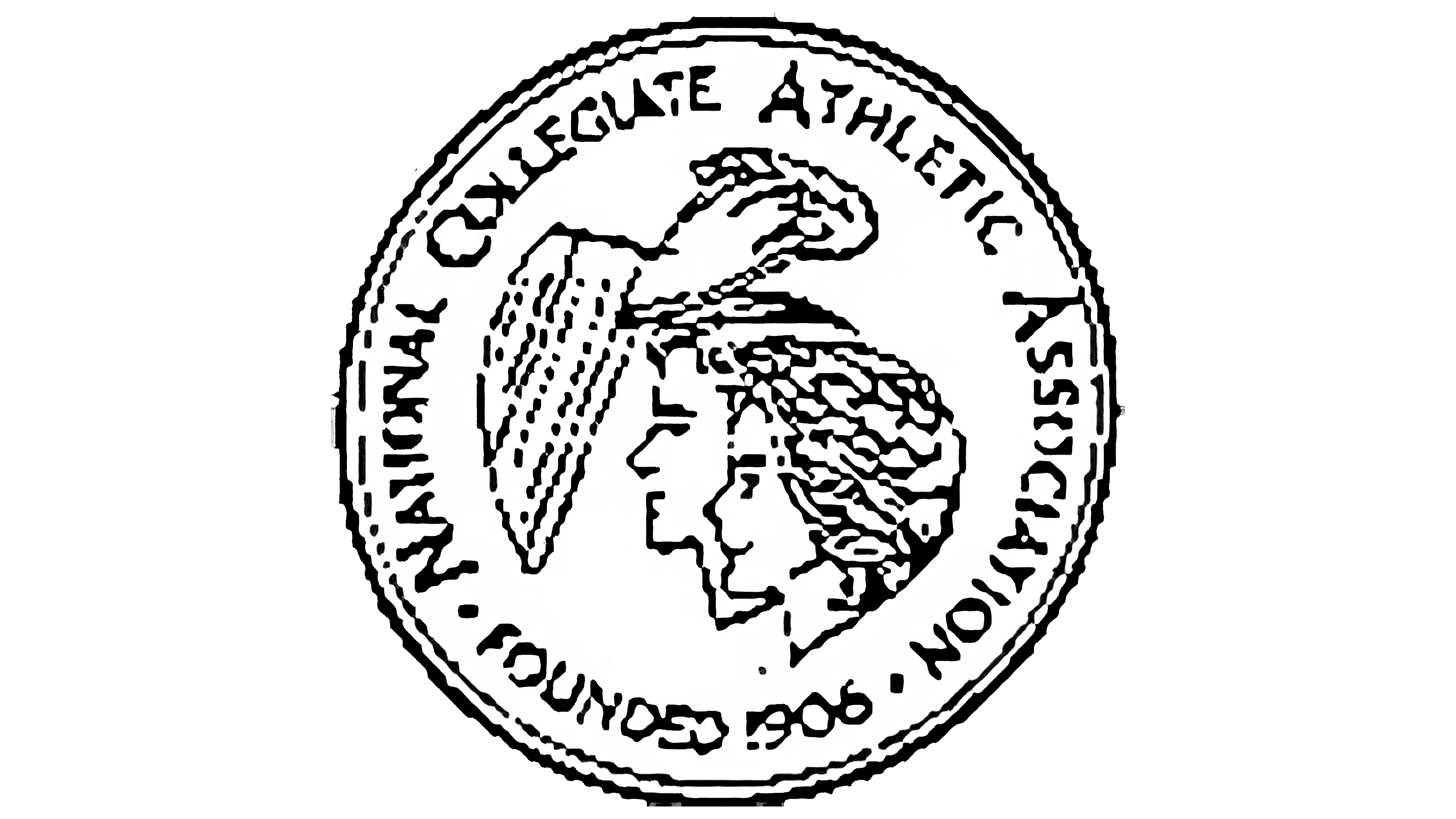
- Team Champion: USC (7th title)
- Edition: 17th
- Dates: June 17-18, 1938
- Host city: Minneapolis, Minnesota
- Venue: Memorial Stadium
- Events: 14

The 1938 NCAA Track and Field Championships was the 17th NCAA track and field championship. The event was held at the University of Minnesota's Memorial Stadium in June 1938. The University of Southern California won its fourth consecutive team title, and new NCAA records were established in the 120-yard high hurdles, one-mile run, two-mile run and high jump.

== Team results ==
Rank	Team	Points
1st place, gold medalist(s)	Southern California	69 3/4
2nd place, silver medalist(s)	Stanford	38
3rd place, bronze medalist(s)	Michigan	28 3/4
4	Wisconsin	28
5	Notre Dame; Rice Institute	24

== Track events ==
100-yard dash
1. Mozel Ellerbee, Tuskegee - 9.7 seconds
2. Adrian Talley, USC
3. Ben Johnson, Columbia
5. William Clifford, Notre Dame

120-yard high hurdles
1. Fred Wolcott, Rice - 14.1 seconds
2. Dick Kearns, Colorado
3. Elmer Gedeon, Michigan

220-yard dash
1. Mack Robinson, Oregon - 21.3 seconds
2. Ray Malott, Stanford
3. Jack Emigh, Montana

220-yard low hurdles
1. Fred Wolcott, Rice - 23.3 seconds
2. Earl Vickery, USC
3. Harvey Woodstra, Michigan State

440-yard dash
1. Ray Malott, Stanford - 46.8 seconds
2. E. Miller, USC
3. H. Bachman, USC

880-yard run
1. John Woodruff, Pitt
2. John Francis, Notre Dame
3. John Marion, Prairieview Teachers

One-mile run
1. Louis Zamperini, USC - 4:08.3 (NCAA record)
2. Charles Fenske, Wisconsin

Two-mile run
1. Walter Mehl, Wisconsin - 9:11.1 (NCAA record)
2. Gregg Rice, Notre Dame
3. Richard Frey, Michigan State

== Field events ==
Broad jump
1. Bill Lacefield, UCLA - 25 feet 1 1/8 inches (7.649 m)
2. William Watson, Michigan - 24 feet 11 1/2 inches (7.607 m)
3. Charles Walker, Ohio State - 24 feet 9 1/2 inches (7.557 m)

High jump
1. David Albritton, Ohio State - 6 feet 8 3/4 inches (2.051 m) (NCAA record)
1. Gil Cruter, Colorado - 6 feet 8 3/4 inches (2.051 m) (NCAA record)
3. Ed Burke, Marquette
3. Wesley Alten, Michigan
3. Delos Thurber, USC
3. Lloyd Thompson, Xavier

Pole vault
1. Loring Day, USC - 14 feet 2 inches (4.32 m)
2. Irving Howe, USC
2. Milt Padway, Wisconsin
2. George Varofr, Oregon

Discus throw
1. Pete Zagar, Stanford - 162 feet 3 1/4 inches (49.460 m)
2. Hugh Gribben, Stanford - 155 feet 2 1/2 inches (47.308 m)
3. Bill Faymonville, Notre Dame - 155 feet 1 inch (47.27 m)

Javelin
1. Nick Vukmanle, Penn State - 215 feet 8 1/4 inches (65.742 m)
2. Larry Bell, Miami (Ohio) - 208 feet 7 3/4 inches (63.595 m)
3. Gillam Graham, Texas - 205 feet 4 1/4 inches (62.592 m)

Shot put
1. Elmer Hackney, Kansas State - 51 feet 8 1/2 inches (15.761 m)
2. Francis Ryan, Columbia - 51 feet 5 1/4 inches (15.678 m)
3. William Watson, Michigan - 51 feet 3 3/8 inches (15.631 m)

== See also ==
- NCAA Men's Outdoor Track and Field Championship
