= Harold Davis (sprinter) =

American sprinter (1921–2007)

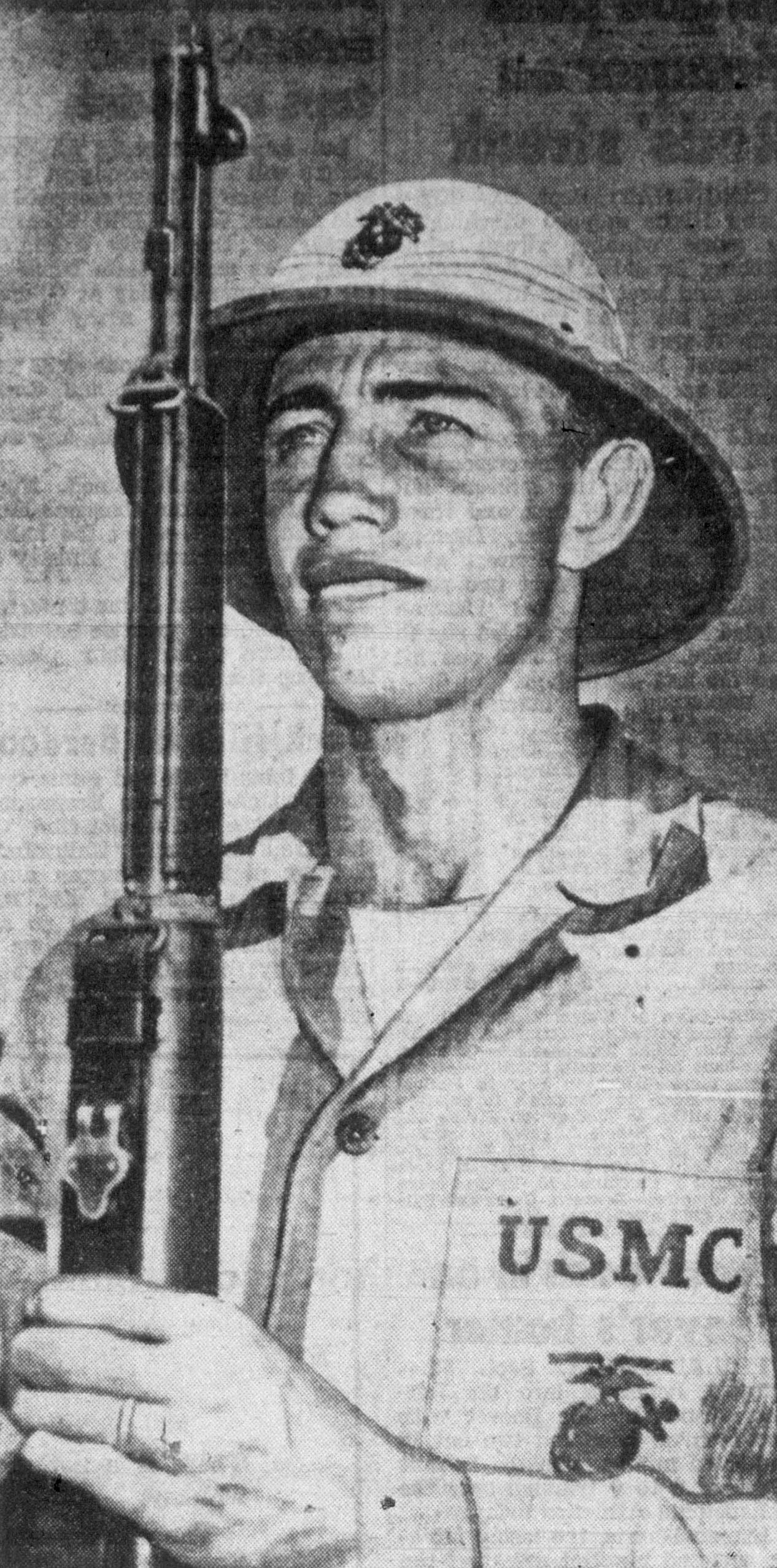
Davis, circa 1943

Harold Davis (born January 5, 1921, in Salinas, California, died August 12, 2007) was an American Track and Field athlete. He was a World Record holder in the 100 metres. In 1974, he was elected to the USA Track & Field National Track and Field Hall of Fame.

== Athletic career ==
Nicknamed the "California Comet", he tied Jesse Owens world record running into a headwind at the Compton Relays on June 6, 1941, and was regarded as the fastest sprinter in the world for a four-year period. Unfortunately for Davis, this was during World War II and the Olympics were cancelled, depriving him of an opportunity for international recognition.

During the period 1940–43, Davis never lost a race over 220 y and only one over 100 y. This last race was a loss to the only man who could be considered his equal, Barney Ewell. The loss happened in the 1941 United States 100 y championship race. Even here, after a poor start, Davis nearly caught Ewell at the finish. In these years when Davis was the man to beat he won 3 United States championships at 100 m (1940,1942–43) and 4 at 200 m (1940–43).

On 6 June 1941, he equalled Jesse Owen's world record for 100 m of 10.2 s (the time was achieved in a heat, he won the final in 10.4 s). On 16 May 1942, he equalled the 100 y record of 9.4 s but this time was never accepted by the world governing body the IAAF because Davis used starting blocks of a type not officially approved.

Davis also ran two wind-aided 220 y/ 200 m races in 20.2 s when the then world record was 20.3 s. The first occurred on 17 May 1941, the second in the United States championship final on 20 June 1943.

At the peak of his career Davis, the "California Comet", was famous throughout the United States not just California, with the simple fact that Davis had submitted an entry to a meet being newsworthy.

== Early life ==
Davis was a talented runner at Live Oak High School, just north of his birthplace in a rural town named Morgan Hill, California – as a 17-year-old he ran 100 y in 9.7 s and 220 y (straight course) in 21.0 s (the then world records were 9.4 s and 20.3 s respectively by Jesse Owens).

After graduation, he went to Salinas Junior College (now Hartnell College). Here he was coached by Hall of Fame coach Lloyd (Bud) Winter, then later at the University of California by Hall of Fame coach Brutus Hamilton.

The depth of Davis's talent was first seen in a race he did not win. On May 7, 1940, he finished fourth in the NCAA 100 y race championship race against some of the best sprinters of the day. He stumbled at the start but made up 4–7 m of deficit in 65 m of the race. Davis was always renowned as a poor starter but this was exceptionally poor even for him. Davis went on to win NCAA 100 and 220-yard titles in 1942 and 1943 representing the University of California.

== Later life ==
Davis suffered a hamstring injury in 1946 that ended his track career.

Davis died in Lakeport, California, in 2007.
