= 1962 NCAA track and field championships =

1962 NCAA Track and Field Championships
- Team Champion: Oregon (1st title)
- Edition: 41st
- Dates: June 15−16, 1962
- Host city: Eugene, Oregon
- Venue: Hayward Field; University of Oregon

The 1962 NCAA Track and Field Championships were contested June 16−17 at the 41st annual NCAA-sanctioned track meet to determine the individual and team national champions of men's collegiate track and field events in the United States. This year's meet was hosted by the University of Oregon at Hayward Field in Eugene. This was first time the event was held at Hayward, which hosted the championship thirteen more times.

This was the last championship before the NCAA split the championship into the two separate classes: the University Division (precursor to Division I) and the College Division (precursor to Divisions II and III).

Oregon won the team national championship, the Ducks' first team title.

== Team Result ==
- Note: Top 10 only
- (H) = Hosts

Rank	Team	Points
1st place, gold medalist(s)	Oregon (H)	85
2nd place, silver medalist(s)	Villanova	40 3/7
3rd place, bronze medalist(s)	USC	27 3/7
4	Southern Illinois	26
5	Stanford	24 3/7
6	San José State	24
7	California	19
8	Maryland	15
9	Washington State	14 16/21
10	Boston College	14
