= Illinois Fighting Illini track and field =

College track and field team

- Founded: 1901
- University: University of Illinois Urbana-Champaign
- Head coach: Petros Kyprianou
- Conference: Big Ten
- Location: Champaign-Urbana, Illinois
- Outdoor track: Illinois Soccer and Track Stadium
- Nickname: Fighting Illini
- Colors: Orange and blue

NCAA Outdoor National Championships
- Men: 1921, 1927, 1944, 1946, 1947; Women: 1970 (AIAW)

The Illinois Fighting Illini track and field team is the track and field program that represents University of Illinois Urbana-Champaign. The Fighting Illini compete in NCAA Division I as a member of the Big Ten Conference. The team is based in Champaign-Urbana, Illinois at the Illinois Soccer and Track Stadium.

The program is coached by Petros Kyprianou. The track and field program officially encompasses four teams because the NCAA considers men's and women's indoor track and field and outdoor track and field as separate sports.

The program has won six national collegiate team titles, beginning at the 1921 NCAA Track and Field Championships and most recently at the 1970 DGWS Outdoor Track and Field Championships.

== Postseason ==
=== AIAW ===
The Fighting Illini have had 12 AIAW individual All-Americans finishing in the top six at the AIAW indoor or outdoor championships.

AIAW All-Americans
Championships	Name	Event	Place
1969 Outdoor	Lyndell Wilken	880 yards	3rd
1969 Outdoor	Lyndell Wilken	Mile run	3rd
1969 Outdoor	Connie Peterson	100 meters hurdles	3rd
1969 Outdoor	Connie Peterson	Javelin throw	5th
1969 Outdoor	Connie Peterson	High jump	2nd
1970 Outdoor	Katherine Jones	100 yards	3rd
1970 Outdoor	Katherine Jones	220 yards	4th
1970 Outdoor	Lyndell Wilken	880 yards	6th
1970 Outdoor	Lyndell Wilken	Mile run	6th
1970 Outdoor	Cheryl Rogers	100 meters hurdles	2nd
1970 Outdoor	Connie Peterson	200 meters hurdles	5th
1970 Outdoor	Unknown	4 × 110 yards relay	2nd
1970 Outdoor	Unknown	4 × 110 yards relay	2nd
1970 Outdoor	Unknown	4 × 110 yards relay	2nd
1970 Outdoor	Unknown	4 × 110 yards relay	2nd
1970 Outdoor	Connie Peterson	High jump	1st
1972 Outdoor	Donna Schulenberg	100 meters hurdles	1st
1972 Outdoor	Donna Schulenberg	200 meters hurdles	2nd
1972 Outdoor	Donna Schulenberg	High jump	2nd
1973 Outdoor	Maeoper West	220 yards	4th
1973 Outdoor	Maeoper West	440 yards	1st
1973 Outdoor	Donna Schulenberg	High jump	6th
1973 Outdoor	Unknown	4 × 110 yards relay	2nd
1973 Outdoor	Unknown	4 × 110 yards relay	2nd
1973 Outdoor	Unknown	4 × 110 yards relay	2nd
1973 Outdoor	Unknown	4 × 110 yards relay	2nd
1977 Outdoor	Beverly Washington	High jump	6th
1978 Indoor	Linn Crieb	300 yards	4th
1978 Indoor	Anita Moyer	2 miles	5th
1978 Indoor	Anita Moyer	2 miles	5th
1978 Indoor	Beverly Washington	High jump	4th
1978 Outdoor	Beverly Washington	High jump	5th
1980 Indoor	Becky Jo Kaiser	Long jump	2nd
1982 Indoor	Becky Jo Kaiser	Long jump	3rd
1982 Outdoor	Marianne Dickerson	10,000 meters	3rd
1982 Outdoor	Cheryl Ward	4 × 800 meters relay	5th
1982 Outdoor	Veegee Elsen	4 × 800 meters relay	5th
1982 Outdoor	Margaret Vogel	4 × 800 meters relay	5th
1982 Outdoor	Gretchen Grier	4 × 800 meters relay	5th
1982 Outdoor	Kathy Pannier	Sprint medley relay	3rd
1982 Outdoor	Jayne Glade	Sprint medley relay	3rd
1982 Outdoor	Rolanda Conda	Sprint medley relay	3rd
1982 Outdoor	Gretchen Grier	Sprint medley relay	3rd
1982 Outdoor	Becky Jo Kaiser	Long jump	5th
1982 Outdoor	Jan Wacaser	Heptathlon	6th

=== NCAA ===
As of 2024, a total of 176 men and 49 women have achieved individual first-team All-American status at the Division I men's outdoor, women's outdoor, men's indoor, or women's indoor national championships (using the modern criteria of top-8 placing regardless of athlete nationality).

First team NCAA All-Americans
Team	Championships	Name	Event	Place	Ref.
Men's	1921 Outdoor	Sam Wallace	220 yards hurdles	4th	
Men's	1921 Outdoor	Howard Yates	800 meters	4th	
Men's	1921 Outdoor	Phillip Donohoe	800 meters	5th	
Men's	1921 Outdoor	Gordon McGinnis	Mile run	2nd	
Men's	1921 Outdoor	Russell Wharton	3000 meters	2nd	
Men's	1921 Outdoor	Harold Osborn	Long jump	2nd	
Men's	1921 Outdoor	Dewey Alberts	Long jump	5th	
Men's	1921 Outdoor	John Weiss	Discus throw	5th	
Men's	1921 Outdoor	Sam Hill	Hammer throw	5th	
Men's	1922 Outdoor	Doug Fressenden	400 meters	3rd	
Men's	1922 Outdoor	Howard Yates	800 meters	4th	
Men's	1922 Outdoor	Bruce Patterson	Mile run	2nd	
Men's	1922 Outdoor	Reuben Swanson	3000 meters	5th	
Men's	1922 Outdoor	Harold Osborn	High jump	1st	
Men's	1922 Outdoor	John Collins	Pole vault	3rd	
Men's	1922 Outdoor	Harold Osborn	Long jump	5th	
Men's	1922 Outdoor	Sam Hill	Hammer throw	3rd	
Men's	1922 Outdoor	Milton Angier	Javelin throw	4th	
Men's	1923 Outdoor	Frank Johnson	110 meters hurdles	4th	
Men's	1923 Outdoor	Paul Sweet	400 meters	3rd	
Men's	1923 Outdoor	Horatio Fitch	400 meters	4th	
Men's	1923 Outdoor	Pitch Johnson	Long jump	4th	
Men's	1923 Outdoor	Sam Hill	Hammer throw	2nd	
Men's	1923 Outdoor	Fred Schildhauer	Javelin throw	6th	
Men's	1925 Outdoor	Dan Kinsey	220 yards hurdles	4th	
Men's	1925 Outdoor	Phil Schoch	400 meters	4th	
Men's	1925 Outdoor	William Wallace	Long jump	3rd	
Men's	1925 Outdoor	Milan Fell	Long jump	5th	
Men's	1926 Outdoor	Chick Werner	220 yards hurdles	5th	
Men's	1926 Outdoor	Phil Schoch	400 meters	4th	
Men's	1926 Outdoor	John Sittig	800 meters	4th	
Men's	1926 Outdoor	Doran Rue	Mile run	6th	
Men's	1926 Outdoor	Arthur Meislahn	High jump	6th	
Men's	1927 Outdoor	Don McKeever	110 meters hurdles	4th	
Men's	1927 Outdoor	John Sittig	800 meters	1st	
Men's	1927 Outdoor	Ray Hall	3000 meters	5th	
Men's	1927 Outdoor	Arthur Meislahn	High jump	6th	
Men's	1927 Outdoor	Theodore Wachowski	High jump	6th	
Men's	1927 Outdoor	Joseph Simon	Long jump	2nd	
Men's	1927 Outdoor	Arthur Meislahn	Long jump	5th	
Men's	1927 Outdoor	Dan Lyon	Shot put	2nd	
Men's	1928 Outdoor	Hal White	800 meters	2nd	
Men's	1928 Outdoor	Bob Orlovich	800 meters	3rd	
Men's	1928 Outdoor	Francis Stine	Mile run	5th	
Men's	1928 Outdoor	Dave Abbott	3000 meters	1st	
Men's	1928 Outdoor	Robert Carr	High jump	4th	
Men's	1928 Outdoor	Norman Heinsen	Pole vault	4th	
Men's	1928 Outdoor	Dan Lyon	Shot put	5th	
Men's	1929 Outdoor	Lee Sentman	220 yards hurdles	4th	
Men's	1929 Outdoor	Robert Rodgers	110 meters hurdles	4th	
Men's	1929 Outdoor	Hal White	800 meters	3rd	
Men's	1929 Outdoor	Dave Abbott	3000 meters	1st	
Men's	1929 Outdoor	Robert Carr	High jump	5th	
Men's	1929 Outdoor	Verne McDermont	Pole vault	5th	
Men's	1929 Outdoor	Frank Simon	Long jump	5th	
Men's	1930 Outdoor	Lee Sentman	220 yards hurdles	1st	
Men's	1930 Outdoor	Jimmy Cave	220 yards hurdles	6th	
Men's	1930 Outdoor	Lee Sentman	110 meters hurdles	2nd	
Men's	1930 Outdoor	Joe Makeever	Mile run	3rd	
Men's	1930 Outdoor	Thomas Miller	High jump	2nd	
Men's	1930 Outdoor	Verne McDermont	Pole vault	6th	
Men's	1931 Outdoor	Jimmy Cave	220 yards hurdles	4th	
Men's	1931 Outdoor	Verne McDermont	Pole vault	1st	
Men's	1931 Outdoor	Frank Purma	Discus throw	2nd	
Men's	1931 Outdoor	Otto Hills	Hammer throw	2nd	
Men's	1932 Outdoor	Hudson Hellmich	100 meters	4th	
Men's	1932 Outdoor	Hudson Hellmich	200 meters	6th	
Men's	1932 Outdoor	Ernest Lennington	Pole vault	2nd	
Men's	1932 Outdoor	Frank Purma	Discus throw	1st	
Men's	1933 Outdoor	Hudson Hellmich	100 meters	6th	
Men's	1933 Outdoor	Dean Woolsey	Mile run	5th	
Men's	1933 Outdoor	Ernest Lennington	Pole vault	3rd	
Men's	1934 Outdoor	Hunter Russell	100 meters	2nd	
Men's	1934 Outdoor	Irving Seeley	Pole vault	3rd	
Men's	1935 Outdoor	Bob Grieve	100 meters	5th	
Men's	1935 Outdoor	Bob Grieve	200 meters	5th	
Men's	1935 Outdoor	Irving Seeley	Pole vault	6th	
Men's	1936 Outdoor	Richard Brunton	Long jump	6th	
Men's	1937 Outdoor	Bob Grieve	100 meters	5th	
Men's	1939 Outdoor	Bob Diefenthaler	High jump	2nd	
Men's	1939 Outdoor	Bill Haviland	Discus throw	6th	
Men's	1941 Outdoor	Larry Stout	Long jump	2nd	
Men's	1942 Outdoor	Bob Rehberg	800 meters	3rd	
Men's	1942 Outdoor	Clarence Dunn	3000 meters	6th	
Men's	1942 Outdoor	Maurice Gould	Long jump	5th	
Men's	1943 Outdoor	Robert Kelley	400 meters	2nd	
Men's	1943 Outdoor	William Beile	800 meters	4th	
Men's	1943 Outdoor	Clarence Dunn	Mile run	5th	
Men's	1943 Outdoor	Herb Matter	Pole vault	4th	
Men's	1944 Outdoor	Buddy Young	100 meters	1st	
Men's	1944 Outdoor	Dave Nichols	110 meters hurdles	1st	
Men's	1944 Outdoor	Robert Ruther	110 meters hurdles	3rd	
Men's	1944 Outdoor	Buddy Young	200 meters	1st	
Men's	1944 Outdoor	Joe Johnson	200 meters	5th	
Men's	1944 Outdoor	Robert Kelley	400 meters	3rd	
Men's	1944 Outdoor	Marce Gonzalez	400 meters	6th	
Men's	1944 Outdoor	Robert Kelley	800 meters	1st	
Men's	1944 Outdoor	Tom Fullerton	High jump	5th	
Men's	1944 Outdoor	Bob Phelps	Pole vault	1st	
Men's	1944 Outdoor	Buddy Young	Long jump	2nd	
Men's	1944 Outdoor	David Best	Long jump	5th	
Men's	1944 Outdoor	Tom Fullerton	Discus throw	6th	
Men's	1944 Outdoor	David Best	220 yards hurdles	4th	
Men's	1945 Outdoor	George Walker	220 yards hurdles	1st	
Men's	1945 Outdoor	George Walker	110 meters hurdles	1st	
Men's	1945 Outdoor	Bill Buster	200 meters	4th	
Men's	1945 Outdoor	Marce Gonzalez	400 meters	4th	
Men's	1945 Outdoor	Henry Aihara	High jump	4th	
Men's	1945 Outdoor	Charles Burghardt	High jump	4th	
Men's	1945 Outdoor	Bob Phelps	Pole vault	1st	
Men's	1945 Outdoor	Henry Aihara	Long jump	1st	
Men's	1946 Outdoor	George Walker	220 yards hurdles	2nd	
Men's	1946 Outdoor	Bill Mathis	100 meters	1st	
Men's	1946 Outdoor	Herb McKenley	200 meters	1st	
Men's	1946 Outdoor	Bill Mathis	200 meters	4th	
Men's	1946 Outdoor	Herb McKenley	400 meters	1st	
Men's	1946 Outdoor	Bob Rehberg	800 meters	4th	
Men's	1946 Outdoor	Bob Rehberg	Mile run	1st	
Men's	1946 Outdoor	John Twomey	3000 meters	3rd	
Men's	1946 Outdoor	Dike Eddleman	High jump	4th	
Men's	1946 Outdoor	Bob Richards	Pole vault	2nd	
Men's	1947 Outdoor	Bill Mathis	100 meters	2nd	
Men's	1947 Outdoor	Herb McKenley	200 meters	1st	
Men's	1947 Outdoor	Herb McKenley	400 meters	1st	
Men's	1947 Outdoor	Bob Rehberg	Mile run	2nd	
Men's	1947 Outdoor	Vic Twomey	3000 meters	4th	
Men's	1947 Outdoor	Dike Eddleman	High jump	2nd	
Men's	1947 Outdoor	Bob Richards	Pole vault	1st	
Men's	1947 Outdoor	Donald Leuthold	Long jump	6th	
Men's	1947 Outdoor	Norm Wasser	Shot put	2nd	
Men's	1948 Outdoor	George Walker	110 meters hurdles	6th	
Men's	1948 Outdoor	George Walker	400 meters hurdles	1st	
Men's	1948 Outdoor	Walt Karkow	5000 meters	5th	
Men's	1948 Outdoor	Vic Twomey	10,000 meters	2nd	
Men's	1948 Outdoor	Dike Eddleman	High jump	1st	
Men's	1948 Outdoor	Lou Irons	High jump	3rd	
Men's	1948 Outdoor	Norm Wasser	Shot put	6th	
Men's	1949 Outdoor	Dike Eddleman	High jump	4th	
Men's	1949 Outdoor	Norm Wasser	Shot put	7th	
Men's	1950 Outdoor	Dick Coleman	Pole vault	5th	
Men's	1951 Outdoor	Cirilo McSween	200 meters	8th	
Men's	1951 Outdoor	Cirilo McSween	400 meters	6th	
Men's	1951 Outdoor	Don Laz	Pole vault	1st	
Men's	1951 Outdoor	Dick Coleman	Pole vault	6th	
Men's	1952 Outdoor	Willie Williams	100 meters	3rd	
Men's	1952 Outdoor	Joel McNulty	110 meters hurdles	6th	
Men's	1952 Outdoor	Joe Corley	400 meters hurdles	7th	
Men's	1952 Outdoor	Henry Cryer	800 meters	2nd	
Men's	1952 Outdoor	Stacey Siders	800 meters	6th	
Men's	1952 Outdoor	Dick Coleman	Pole vault	1st	
Men's	1952 Outdoor	Ron Mitchell	Triple jump	7th	
Men's	1953 Outdoor	Joel McNulty	220 yards hurdles	2nd	
Men's	1953 Outdoor	Joe Corley	220 yards hurdles	5th	
Men's	1953 Outdoor	Willie Williams	100 meters	1st	
Men's	1953 Outdoor	Joel McNulty	110 meters hurdles	2nd	
Men's	1953 Outdoor	Willard Thomson	110 meters hurdles	3rd	
Men's	1953 Outdoor	Gene Maynard	800 meters	4th	
Men's	1953 Outdoor	Stacey Siders	800 meters	6th	
Men's	1953 Outdoor	Walt Jewsbury	3000 meters	5th	
Men's	1953 Outdoor	Tom Floyd	Long jump	7th	
Men's	1954 Outdoor	Joe Corley	220 yards hurdles	1st	
Men's	1954 Outdoor	Willie Williams	100 meters	1st	
Men's	1954 Outdoor	Willard Thomson	110 meters hurdles	1st	
Men's	1954 Outdoor	Gene Maynard	800 meters	6th	
Men's	1954 Outdoor	Ron Mitchell	High jump	6th	
Men's	1954 Outdoor	Dale Foster	Pole vault	5th	
Men's	1955 Outdoor	Henry Cryer	800 meters	4th	
Men's	1955 Outdoor	Karl Jonsson	3000 meters	6th	
Men's	1955 Outdoor	Dale Foster	Pole vault	8th	
Men's	1957 Outdoor	Al Urbanckas	High jump	1st	
Men's	1957 Outdoor	Larry Stewart	Shot put	7th	
Men's	1958 Outdoor	Jim Bowers	Mile run	8th	
Men's	1958 Outdoor	Ernie Haisley	High jump	2nd	
Men's	1958 Outdoor	Ron Mitchell	High jump	4th	
Men's	1958 Outdoor	Bobby Mitchell	Long jump	2nd	
Men's	1958 Outdoor	Bob Pellant	Discus throw	6th	
Men's	1959 Outdoor	Ward Miller	100 meters	6th	
Men's	1959 Outdoor	Ward Miller	200 meters	8th	
Men's	1959 Outdoor	George Kerr	800 meters	1st	
Men's	1959 Outdoor	Ron Mitchell	High jump	6th	
Men's	1959 Outdoor	Paul Foreman	Long jump	4th	
Men's	1959 Outdoor	Paul Foreman	Triple jump	4th	
Men's	1960 Outdoor	George Kerr	800 meters	1st	
Men's	1960 Outdoor	Ken Brown	5000 meters	3rd	
Men's	1960 Outdoor	Paul Foreman	Long jump	8th	
Men's	1960 Outdoor	Paul Foreman	Triple jump	5th	
Men's	1961 Outdoor	Armand Lecrone	High jump	8th	
Men's	1961 Outdoor	Deryck Taylor	Long jump	3rd	
Men's	1964 Outdoor	Trenton Jackson	100 meters	3rd	
Men's	1964 Outdoor	Al Carius	10,000 meters	7th	
Men's	1964 Outdoor	Gilwyn Williams	4 × 100 meters relay	1st	
Men's	1964 Outdoor	Mel Blenheim	4 × 100 meters relay	1st	
Men's	1964 Outdoor	Mike Yavorski	4 × 100 meters relay	1st	
Men's	1964 Outdoor	Trenton Jackson	4 × 100 meters relay	1st	
Men's	1965 Indoor	Trenton Jackson	55 meters	3rd	
Men's	1966 Indoor	Bill Hartman	1000 meters	5th	
Men's	1971 Indoor	Robert Mango	800 meters	5th	
Men's	1971 Outdoor	Ron Phillips	800 meters	3rd	
Men's	1972 Indoor	Lee Labadie	800 meters	5th	
Men's	1972 Indoor	Mike Durkin	1000 meters	5th	
Men's	1972 Indoor	Dave Kaemerer	4 × 800 meters relay	1st	
Men's	1972 Indoor	Ron Phillips	4 × 800 meters relay	1st	
Men's	1972 Indoor	Lee LaBadie	4 × 800 meters relay	1st	
Men's	1972 Indoor	Rob Mango	4 × 800 meters relay	1st	
Men's	1972 Outdoor	Ron Phillips	800 meters	2nd	
Men's	1972 Outdoor	Rob Mango	800 meters	7th	
Men's	1972 Outdoor	Mike Durkin	1500 meters	8th	
Men's	1972 Outdoor	Rick Gross	3000 meters steeplechase	6th	
Men's	1973 Indoor	David Kaemerer	600 yards	4th	
Men's	1973 Indoor	Rob Mango	800 meters	5th	
Men's	1973 Indoor	Mike Durkin	1000 meters	4th	
Men's	1973 Outdoor	Jim Fasules	400 meters hurdles	8th	
Men's	1973 Outdoor	Rob Mango	800 meters	2nd	
Men's	1974 Indoor	Dave Kaemerer	800 meters	5th	
Men's	1974 Indoor	Mike Durkin	Mile run	2nd	
Men's	1974 Indoor	Charlton Ehizuelen	Triple jump	2nd	
Men's	1974 Outdoor	Dave Kaemerer	800 meters	8th	
Men's	1974 Outdoor	Charlton Ehizuelen	Triple jump	1st	
Men's	1975 Indoor	Charlie White	Distance medley relay	5th	
Men's	1975 Indoor	Ben App	Distance medley relay	5th	
Men's	1975 Indoor	Rich Brooks	Distance medley relay	5th	
Men's	1975 Indoor	Mike Durkin	Distance medley relay	5th	
Men's	1975 Indoor	Charlton Ehizuelen	Triple jump	2nd	
Men's	1975 Outdoor	Craig Virgin	10,000 meters	3rd	
Men's	1975 Outdoor	Charlton Ehizuelen	Long jump	1st	
Men's	1976 Indoor	James Hanlon	55 meters hurdles	4th	
Men's	1976 Indoor	Charlie White	800 meters	5th	
Men's	1976 Indoor	Craig Virgin	3000 meters	2nd	
Men's	1976 Indoor	Charlton Ehizuelen	Long jump	1st	
Men's	1976 Outdoor	Jeff Jirele	1500 meters	7th	
Men's	1976 Outdoor	Craig Virgin	10,000 meters	2nd	
Men's	1976 Outdoor	Doug Laz	Pole vault	6th	
Men's	1977 Indoor	Craig Virgin	5000 meters	3rd	
Men's	1977 Indoor	Tim Smith	4 × 800 meters relay	2nd	
Men's	1977 Indoor	Steve Schellenberger	4 × 800 meters relay	2nd	
Men's	1977 Indoor	Jeff Jirele	4 × 800 meters relay	2nd	
Men's	1977 Indoor	Charlie White	4 × 800 meters relay	2nd	
Men's	1977 Indoor	Charlton Ehizuelen	Long jump	1st	
Men's	1977 Indoor	Charlton Ehizuelen	Triple jump	3rd	
Men's	1977 Outdoor	Craig Virgin	5000 meters	4th	
Men's	1977 Outdoor	Craig Virgin	10,000 meters	2nd	
Men's	1977 Outdoor	Doug Laz	Pole vault	4th	
Men's	1977 Outdoor	Charlton Ehizuelen	Long jump	2nd	
Men's	1977 Outdoor	Charlton Ehizuelen	Triple jump	3rd	
Men's	1979 Outdoor	Gail Olson	High jump	5th	
Men's	1980 Indoor	Dave Ayoub	Distance medley relay	5th	
Men's	1980 Indoor	Mark Claypool	Distance medley relay	5th	
Men's	1980 Indoor	Lonnie Bissell	Distance medley relay	5th	
Men's	1980 Indoor	Jon Schmidt	Distance medley relay	5th	
Men's	1981 Indoor	Mike Lehmann	Shot put	3rd	
Men's	1981 Outdoor	Mike Lehmann	Shot put	2nd	
Men's	1982 Indoor	Mike Lehmann	Shot put	1st	
Men's	1982 Outdoor	Mike Lehmann	Shot put	2nd	
Men's	1983 Outdoor	Tom Stevens	3000 meters steeplechase	6th	
Men's	1984 Outdoor	Lester Washington	100 meters	7th	
Men's	1985 Indoor	Tim Simon	400 meters	3rd	
Men's	1985 Outdoor	Lane Lohr	Pole vault	6th	
Men's	1986 Indoor	Lane Lohr	Pole vault	2nd	
Men's	1986 Outdoor	Lane Lohr	Pole vault	4th	
Women's	1986 Outdoor	Kim Dunlap	4 × 100 meters relay	7th	
Women's	1986 Outdoor	Angela McClatchey	4 × 100 meters relay	7th	
Women's	1986 Outdoor	Leticia Beverly	4 × 100 meters relay	7th	
Women's	1986 Outdoor	Renee Carr	4 × 100 meters relay	7th	
Men's	1987 Indoor	Lane Lohr	Pole vault	2nd	
Men's	1987 Outdoor	Tim Simon	400 meters	8th	
Men's	1987 Outdoor	Charlton Hamer	800 meters	4th	
Men's	1987 Outdoor	Jon Thanos	3000 meters steeplechase	8th	
Men's	1987 Outdoor	David Halle	10,000 meters	5th	
Men's	1987 Outdoor	Rod Tolbert	4 × 400 meters relay	8th	
Men's	1987 Outdoor	Tim Simon	4 × 400 meters relay	8th	
Men's	1987 Outdoor	Kevin Brooks	4 × 400 meters relay	8th	
Men's	1987 Outdoor	Lee Bridges	4 × 400 meters relay	8th	
Men's	1987 Outdoor	Lane Lohr	Pole vault	2nd	
Women's	1987 Outdoor	Victoria Fulcher	400 meters hurdles	8th	
Women's	1987 Outdoor	Leticia Beverly	4 × 100 meters relay	7th	
Women's	1987 Outdoor	Renee Carr	4 × 100 meters relay	7th	
Women's	1987 Outdoor	Angela McClatchey	4 × 100 meters relay	7th	
Women's	1987 Outdoor	Celena Mondie	4 × 100 meters relay	7th	
Men's	1988 Indoor	Rod Tolbert	200 meters	6th	
Men's	1988 Indoor	Tim Simon	400 meters	2nd	
Men's	1988 Indoor	Charlton Hamer	800 meters	5th	
Men's	1988 Indoor	Rod Tolbert	4 × 400 meters relay	2nd	
Men's	1988 Indoor	Lee Bridges	4 × 400 meters relay	2nd	
Men's	1988 Indoor	Charlton Hamer	4 × 400 meters relay	2nd	
Men's	1988 Indoor	Tim Simon	4 × 400 meters relay	2nd	
Men's	1988 Indoor	Dean Starkey	Pole vault	1st	
Men's	1988 Indoor	Alvin Campbell	Triple jump	8th	
Women's	1988 Indoor	Celena Mondie	55 meters	5th	
Women's	1988 Indoor	Celena Mondie	200 meters	6th	
Women's	1988 Indoor	Angela McClatchery	200 meters	8th	
Women's	1988 Indoor	Victoria Fulcher	4 × 400 meters relay	3rd	
Women's	1988 Indoor	Shirley Bodden	4 × 400 meters relay	3rd	
Women's	1988 Indoor	Celena Mondie	4 × 400 meters relay	3rd	
Women's	1988 Indoor	Angela McClatchey	4 × 400 meters relay	3rd	
Women's	1988 Indoor	Deborah Smith	Shot put	8th	
Men's	1988 Outdoor	Tim Simon	400 meters	3rd	
Men's	1988 Outdoor	Charlton Hamer	800 meters	5th	
Men's	1988 Outdoor	Jon Thanos	3000 meters steeplechase	5th	
Men's	1988 Outdoor	Byron Benso	4 × 400 meters relay	4th	
Men's	1988 Outdoor	Lee Bridges	4 × 400 meters relay	4th	
Men's	1988 Outdoor	Charlton Hamer	4 × 400 meters relay	4th	
Men's	1988 Outdoor	Tim Simon	4 × 400 meters relay	4th	
Men's	1988 Outdoor	Dean Starkey	Pole vault	3rd	
Women's	1988 Outdoor	Celena Mondie	200 meters	8th	
Women's	1988 Outdoor	Victoria Fulcher	400 meters hurdles	3rd	
Women's	1988 Outdoor	Victoria Fulcher	4 × 100 meters relay	6th	
Women's	1988 Outdoor	Angela McClatchey	4 × 100 meters relay	6th	
Women's	1988 Outdoor	Leticia Beverly	4 × 100 meters relay	6th	
Women's	1988 Outdoor	Celena Mondie	4 × 100 meters relay	6th	
Women's	1988 Outdoor	Victoria Fulcher	4 × 400 meters relay	5th	
Women's	1988 Outdoor	Angela McClatchey	4 × 400 meters relay	5th	
Women's	1988 Outdoor	Shayla Baine	4 × 400 meters relay	5th	
Women's	1988 Outdoor	Celena Mondie	4 × 400 meters relay	5th	
Women's	1988 Outdoor	Deborah Smith	Shot put	7th	
Men's	1989 Indoor	Tim Clancy	4 × 800 meters relay	5th	
Men's	1989 Indoor	Rich Kolasa	4 × 800 meters relay	5th	
Men's	1989 Indoor	Aaron Rogers	4 × 800 meters relay	5th	
Men's	1989 Indoor	Len Sitko	4 × 800 meters relay	5th	
Men's	1989 Indoor	Dean Starkey	Pole vault	1st	
Women's	1989 Indoor	Celena Mondie	55 meters	5th	
Women's	1989 Indoor	Celena Mondie	200 meters	4th	
Women's	1989 Indoor	Shayla Baine	4 × 400 meters relay	4th	
Women's	1989 Indoor	Angela McClatchey	4 × 400 meters relay	4th	
Women's	1989 Indoor	Celena Mondie	4 × 400 meters relay	4th	
Women's	1989 Indoor	Renee Carr	4 × 400 meters relay	4th	
Women's	1989 Indoor	Deborah Smith	Shot put	7th	
Men's	1989 Outdoor	Lee Bridges	400 meters	6th	
Men's	1989 Outdoor	Dean Starkey	Pole vault	7th	
Women's	1989 Outdoor	Celena Mondie	200 meters	6th	
Women's	1989 Outdoor	Celena Mondie	400 meters	3rd	
Women's	1989 Outdoor	Althea Thomas	4 × 100 meters relay	2nd	
Women's	1989 Outdoor	Angela McClatchey	4 × 100 meters relay	2nd	
Women's	1989 Outdoor	Renee Carr	4 × 100 meters relay	2nd	
Women's	1989 Outdoor	Celena Mondie	4 × 100 meters relay	2nd	
Women's	1989 Outdoor	Deborah Smith	Shot put	3rd	
Women's	1990 Indoor	Celena Mondie	55 meters	6th	
Women's	1990 Indoor	Shayla Baine	4 × 400 meters relay	5th	
Women's	1990 Indoor	Renee Carr	4 × 400 meters relay	5th	
Women's	1990 Indoor	Celena Mondie	4 × 400 meters relay	5th	
Women's	1990 Indoor	Althea Thomas	4 × 400 meters relay	5th	
Women's	1990 Outdoor	Celena Mondie	100 meters	2nd	
Women's	1990 Outdoor	Celena Mondie	200 meters	3rd	
Women's	1990 Outdoor	Althea Thomas	4 × 100 meters relay	2nd	
Women's	1990 Outdoor	Tonja Buford	4 × 100 meters relay	2nd	
Women's	1990 Outdoor	Renee Carr	4 × 100 meters relay	2nd	
Women's	1990 Outdoor	Celena Mondie	4 × 100 meters relay	2nd	
Men's	1991 Indoor	Aaron Rogers	4 × 800 meters relay	6th	
Men's	1991 Indoor	Brian Haas	4 × 800 meters relay	6th	
Men's	1991 Indoor	Jason West	4 × 800 meters relay	6th	
Men's	1991 Indoor	Len Sitko	4 × 800 meters relay	6th	
Men's	1991 Outdoor	Bob Shank	Pole vault	7th	
Women's	1991 Outdoor	Tonja Buford	100 meters hurdles	3rd	
Women's	1991 Outdoor	Shayla Baine	4 × 400 meters relay	7th	
Women's	1991 Outdoor	Althea Thomas	4 × 400 meters relay	7th	
Women's	1991 Outdoor	McKelayaie Brown	4 × 400 meters relay	7th	
Women's	1991 Outdoor	Tonja Buford	4 × 400 meters relay	7th	
Men's	1992 Indoor	Marko Koers	800 meters	4th	
Men's	1992 Outdoor	Len Sitko	1500 meters	3rd	
Women's	1992 Outdoor	Tonja Buford	100 meters hurdles	3rd	
Women's	1992 Outdoor	Tonja Buford	400 meters hurdles	1st	
Women's	1992 Outdoor	Laura Simmering	3000 meters	6th	
Men's	1993 Indoor	Marko Koers	800 meters	1st	
Women's	1993 Indoor	Tonja Buford	55 meters hurdles	2nd	
Men's	1993 Outdoor	Marko Koers	1500 meters	1st	
Men's	1993 Outdoor	Anthony Jones	4 × 400 meters relay	8th	
Men's	1993 Outdoor	Earl Jenkins	4 × 400 meters relay	8th	
Men's	1993 Outdoor	Ben Beyers	4 × 400 meters relay	8th	
Men's	1993 Outdoor	Scott Turner	4 × 400 meters relay	8th	
Women's	1993 Outdoor	Tonja Buford	100 meters hurdles	5th	
Women's	1993 Outdoor	Tonja Buford	400 meters hurdles	2nd	
Women's	1993 Outdoor	Tonya Williams	400 meters hurdles	3rd	
Women's	1993 Outdoor	Yolanda Baker	4 × 100 meters relay	5th	
Women's	1993 Outdoor	Janelle Johnson	4 × 100 meters relay	5th	
Women's	1993 Outdoor	Tonya Williams	4 × 100 meters relay	5th	
Women's	1993 Outdoor	Tonja Buford	4 × 100 meters relay	5th	
Women's	1993 Outdoor	Tonya Williams	4 × 400 meters relay	3rd	
Women's	1993 Outdoor	Katherine Williams	4 × 400 meters relay	3rd	
Women's	1993 Outdoor	Janelle Johnson	4 × 400 meters relay	3rd	
Women's	1993 Outdoor	Tonja Buford	4 × 400 meters relay	3rd	
Men's	1994 Indoor	Anthony Jones	55 meters	5th	
Men's	1994 Indoor	Marko Koers	800 meters	2nd	
Women's	1994 Indoor	Tonja Williams	55 meters hurdles	2nd	
Women's	1994 Indoor	Nora Weber	High jump	6th	
Men's	1994 Outdoor	Marko Koers	800 meters	2nd	
Men's	1994 Outdoor	Dorian Green	4 × 400 meters relay	4th	
Men's	1994 Outdoor	Anthony Jones	4 × 400 meters relay	4th	
Men's	1994 Outdoor	Ben Beyers	4 × 400 meters relay	4th	
Men's	1994 Outdoor	Scott Turner	4 × 400 meters relay	4th	
Men's	1994 Outdoor	Shawn Schleizer	Shot put	8th	
Women's	1994 Outdoor	Tonya Williams	400 meters hurdles	8th	
Women's	1994 Outdoor	Janelle Johnson	4 × 400 meters relay	7th	
Women's	1994 Outdoor	Hope Sanders	4 × 400 meters relay	7th	
Women's	1994 Outdoor	Katherine Williams	4 × 400 meters relay	7th	
Women's	1994 Outdoor	Tonya Williams	4 × 400 meters relay	7th	
Women's	1994 Outdoor	Carmel Corbett	Heptathlon	4th	
Men's	1995 Indoor	Dorian Green	400 meters	4th	
Men's	1995 Indoor	Marko Koers	800 meters	6th	
Men's	1995 Indoor	Eric Henson	Distance medley relay	3rd	
Men's	1995 Indoor	Ben Beyers	Distance medley relay	3rd	
Men's	1995 Indoor	Chris Saunders	Distance medley relay	3rd	
Men's	1995 Indoor	Marko Koers	Distance medley relay	3rd	
Men's	1995 Indoor	Daren McDonough	Pole vault	2nd	
Men's	1995 Indoor	Jeff Teach	Shot put	6th	
Women's	1995 Indoor	Hope Sanders	800 meters	4th	
Women's	1995 Indoor	Carmel Corbett	High jump	5th	
Men's	1995 Outdoor	Daren McDonough	Pole vault	4th	
Men's	1995 Outdoor	Jeff Teach	Shot put	7th	
Women's	1995 Outdoor	Tonya Williams	100 meters hurdles	3rd	
Women's	1995 Outdoor	Aspen Burkett	200 meters	5th	
Women's	1995 Outdoor	Tonya Williams	400 meters hurdles	1st	
Women's	1995 Outdoor	Tama Tochihara	800 meters	5th	
Women's	1995 Outdoor	Benita Kelley	4 × 100 meters relay	3rd	
Women's	1995 Outdoor	Terra Crutchfield-Tyus	4 × 100 meters relay	3rd	
Women's	1995 Outdoor	Tonya Williams	4 × 100 meters relay	3rd	
Women's	1995 Outdoor	Aspen Burkett	4 × 100 meters relay	3rd	
Women's	1995 Outdoor	Carmel Corbett	High jump	7th	
Men's	1996 Indoor	Bobby True	Distance medley relay	4th	
Men's	1996 Indoor	Matt Klima	Distance medley relay	4th	
Men's	1996 Indoor	Cortney Lamb	Distance medley relay	4th	
Men's	1996 Indoor	Barry Pearman	Distance medley relay	4th	
Women's	1996 Indoor	Benita Kelley	55 meters	3rd	
Women's	1996 Indoor	Tonya Williams	55 meters hurdles	2nd	
Women's	1996 Indoor	Dawn Riley	55 meters hurdles	3rd	
Women's	1996 Indoor	Nora Weber	High jump	4th	
Women's	1996 Indoor	Collinus Newsome	Shot put	6th	
Men's	1996 Outdoor	Marko Koers	800 meters	2nd	
Men's	1996 Outdoor	Marko Koers	1500 meters	1st	
Women's	1996 Outdoor	Benita Kelley	100 meters	8th	
Women's	1996 Outdoor	Tonya Williams	100 meters hurdles	2nd	
Women's	1996 Outdoor	Dawn Riley	100 meters hurdles	6th	
Women's	1996 Outdoor	Aspen Burkett	200 meters	8th	
Women's	1996 Outdoor	Tonya Williams	400 meters hurdles	1st	
Women's	1996 Outdoor	Benita Kelley	4 × 100 meters relay	3rd	
Women's	1996 Outdoor	Dawn Riley	4 × 100 meters relay	3rd	
Women's	1996 Outdoor	Tonya Williams	4 × 100 meters relay	3rd	
Women's	1996 Outdoor	Aspen Burkett	4 × 100 meters relay	3rd	
Women's	1996 Outdoor	Nora Weber	High jump	3rd	
Women's	1996 Outdoor	Stacy Ann Grant	High jump	5th	
Women's	1996 Outdoor	Collinus Newsome	Shot put	6th	
Women's	1996 Outdoor	Laura Mindock	Discus throw	7th	
Men's	1997 Indoor	Barry Pearman	Distance medley relay	5th	
Men's	1997 Indoor	Matt Rodriguez	Distance medley relay	5th	
Men's	1997 Indoor	Bobby True	Distance medley relay	5th	
Men's	1997 Indoor	Cortney Lamb	Distance medley relay	5th	
Women's	1997 Indoor	Benita Kelley	55 meters	4th	
Women's	1997 Indoor	Stacy Ann Grant	High jump	5th	
Women's	1997 Indoor	Collinus Newsome	Shot put	8th	
Women's	1997 Outdoor	Benita Kelley	100 meters	7th	
Women's	1997 Outdoor	Stacy Ann Grant	High jump	7th	
Men's	1998 Indoor	Bobby True	800 meters	3rd	
Men's	1998 Indoor	Chris Jones	4 × 400 meters relay	2nd	
Men's	1998 Indoor	Tyrone Jones	4 × 400 meters relay	2nd	
Men's	1998 Indoor	Sherman Armstrong	4 × 400 meters relay	2nd	
Men's	1998 Indoor	Matt Klima	4 × 400 meters relay	2nd	
Women's	1998 Indoor	Benita Kelley	55 meters	8th	
Women's	1998 Indoor	Candace Nicholson	4 × 400 meters relay	8th	
Women's	1998 Indoor	Aleisha Latimer	4 × 400 meters relay	8th	
Women's	1998 Indoor	Aspen Burkett	4 × 400 meters relay	8th	
Women's	1998 Indoor	Yvonne Harrison	4 × 400 meters relay	8th	
Women's	1998 Indoor	Stacy Ann Grant	High jump	4th	
Men's	1998 Outdoor	Bobby True	800 meters	8th	
Men's	1998 Outdoor	Joe Knuffman	Long jump	7th	
Women's	1998 Outdoor	Yvonne Harrison	400 meters hurdles	2nd	
Women's	1998 Outdoor	Benita Kelley	4 × 100 meters relay	6th	
Women's	1998 Outdoor	Kerry-Ann Richards	4 × 100 meters relay	6th	
Women's	1998 Outdoor	Lyria Martin	4 × 100 meters relay	6th	
Women's	1998 Outdoor	Aspen Burkett	4 × 100 meters relay	6th	
Women's	1998 Outdoor	Stacy Ann Grant	High jump	5th	
Men's	1999 Indoor	Bobby True	800 meters	5th	
Women's	1999 Indoor	Kerry-Ann Richards	60 meters	6th	
Women's	1999 Indoor	Aleisha Latimer	60 meters	7th	
Women's	1999 Indoor	Stacy Grant	High jump	6th	
Men's	1999 Outdoor	Bobby True	800 meters	4th	
Men's	1999 Outdoor	Babatunde Ridley	Long jump	7th	
Men's	2000 Indoor	Sherman Armstrong	400 meters	8th	
Men's	2000 Indoor	Babatunde Ridley	4 × 400 meters relay	7th	
Men's	2000 Indoor	Tyrone Jones	4 × 400 meters relay	7th	
Men's	2000 Indoor	Kendall McCroy	4 × 400 meters relay	7th	
Men's	2000 Indoor	Sherman Armstrong	4 × 400 meters relay	7th	
Women's	2000 Indoor	Tara Mendozza	Mile run	5th	
Men's	2000 Outdoor	Sherman Armstrong	400 meters hurdles	3rd	
Women's	2000 Outdoor	Perdita Felicien	100 meters hurdles	6th	
Women's	2000 Outdoor	Chequetta Bearfield	4 × 100 meters relay	5th	
Women's	2000 Outdoor	Perdita Felicien	4 × 100 meters relay	5th	
Women's	2000 Outdoor	Lyria Martin	4 × 100 meters relay	5th	
Women's	2000 Outdoor	Kerry-Ann Richards	4 × 100 meters relay	5th	
Men's	2001 Indoor	Jason van Swol	800 meters	8th	
Women's	2001 Indoor	Perdita Felicien	60 meters hurdles	2nd	
Women's	2001 Outdoor	Susanna Kallur	100 meters hurdles	4th	
Women's	2001 Outdoor	Perdita Felicien	100 meters hurdles	5th	
Women's	2001 Outdoor	Jenny Kallur	100 meters hurdles	7th	
Women's	2001 Outdoor	Gia Lewis	Discus throw	5th	
Women's	2002 Indoor	Perdita Felicien	60 meters hurdles	1st	
Women's	2002 Indoor	Susanna Kallur	60 meters hurdles	3rd	
Women's	2002 Outdoor	Perdita Felicien	100 meters hurdles	1st	
Women's	2002 Outdoor	Susanna Kallur	100 meters hurdles	3rd	
Women's	2002 Outdoor	Jenny Kallur	4 × 100 meters relay	6th	
Women's	2002 Outdoor	Nicole Whitman	4 × 100 meters relay	6th	
Women's	2002 Outdoor	Shanna Pickett	4 × 100 meters relay	6th	
Women's	2002 Outdoor	Perdita Felicien	4 × 100 meters relay	6th	
Women's	2003 Indoor	Perdita Felicien	60 meters hurdles	3rd	
Women's	2003 Outdoor	Perdita Felicien	100 meters hurdles	1st	
Women's	2003 Outdoor	Perdita Felicien	100 meters hurdles	1st	
Women's	2003 Outdoor	Chequette Bearfield	4 × 100 meters relay	8th	
Women's	2003 Outdoor	Nicole Whitman	4 × 100 meters relay	8th	
Women's	2003 Outdoor	Shanna Pickett	4 × 100 meters relay	8th	
Women's	2003 Outdoor	Perdita Felicien	4 × 100 meters relay	8th	
Women's	2003 Outdoor	Nicole Whitman	Triple jump	8th	
Men's	2004 Outdoor	Adrian Walker	400 meters hurdles	7th	
Men's	2004 Outdoor	Abraham Reed-Jones	400 meters hurdles	8th	
Women's	2004 Outdoor	Carlene Robinson	800 meters	7th	
Women's	2005 Indoor	Yvonne Mensah	60 meters hurdles	8th	
Women's	2005 Indoor	Cassie Hunt	3000 meters	8th	
Women's	2005 Outdoor	Cassie Hunt	3000 meters steeplechase	2nd	
Men's	2006 Indoor	Abe Jones	400 meters	8th	
Men's	2006 Indoor	Nathan Vadeboncouer	4 × 400 meters relay	2nd	
Men's	2006 Indoor	Abe Jones	4 × 400 meters relay	2nd	
Men's	2006 Indoor	Trammel Smith	4 × 400 meters relay	2nd	
Men's	2006 Indoor	Adrian Walker	4 × 400 meters relay	2nd	
Women's	2006 Indoor	Yvonne Mensah	Triple jump	8th	
Men's	2006 Outdoor	Nick Brown	Triple jump	8th	
Women's	2006 Outdoor	Camille Robinson	400 meters hurdles	6th	
Women's	2006 Outdoor	Cassie Hunt	3000 meters steeplechase	2nd	
Men's	2007 Indoor	Gakologelwang Masheto	400 meters	5th	
Women's	2007 Indoor	Yvonne Mensah	Long jump	6th	
Men's	2007 Outdoor	Gakologelwang Masheto	400 meters	4th	
Women's	2007 Outdoor	Carlene Robinson	400 meters hurdles	7th	
Women's	2008 Indoor	Danelle Woods	Distance medley relay	6th	
Women's	2008 Indoor	Omoye Ugiagbe	Distance medley relay	6th	
Women's	2008 Indoor	Rachel Hernandez	Distance medley relay	6th	
Women's	2008 Indoor	Angela Bizzarri	Distance medley relay	6th	
Women's	2008 Outdoor	Angela Bizzarri	5000 meters	2nd	
Men's	2009 Indoor	Andrew Riley	60 meters hurdles	6th	
Women's	2009 Indoor	Angela Bizzarri	3000 meters	4th	
Women's	2009 Indoor	Aja Evans	Shot put	5th	
Men's	2009 Outdoor	Andrew Riley	110 meters hurdles	5th	
Men's	2009 Outdoor	Greg Shroka	High jump	6th	
Women's	2009 Outdoor	Deserea Brown	400 meters hurdles	5th	
Women's	2009 Outdoor	Angela Bizzarri	5000 meters	1st	
Women's	2009 Outdoor	Aja Evans	Shot put	5th	
Men's	2010 Indoor	Andrew Riley	60 meters hurdles	5th	
Women's	2010 Indoor	Angela Bizzarri	3000 meters	1st	
Men's	2010 Outdoor	Andrew Riley	110 meters hurdles	1st	
Men's	2011 Indoor	Andrew Riley	60 meters hurdles	1st	
Women's	2011 Indoor	Tamika Robinson	60 meters hurdles	7th	
Men's	2011 Outdoor	Stanley Azie	100 meters	6th	
Men's	2011 Outdoor	Andrew Riley	110 meters hurdles	2nd	
Men's	2011 Outdoor	Cody Wisslead	400 meters hurdles	8th	
Men's	2011 Outdoor	Andrew Riley	4 × 100 meters relay	3rd	
Men's	2011 Outdoor	Azeez Shogbuyi	4 × 100 meters relay	3rd	
Men's	2011 Outdoor	Josh Zinzer	4 × 100 meters relay	3rd	
Men's	2011 Outdoor	Stanley Azie)	4 × 100 meters relay	3rd	
Women's	2011 Outdoor	Ashley Kelly	400 meters	8th	
Men's	2012 Indoor	Andrew Riley	60 meters	2nd	
Men's	2012 Indoor	Andrew Riley	60 meters hurdles	4th	
Women's	2012 Indoor	Ashley Spencer	200 meters	6th	
Men's	2012 Outdoor	Andrew Riley	100 meters	1st	
Men's	2012 Outdoor	Andrew Riley	110 meters hurdles	1st	
Women's	2012 Outdoor	Ashley Spencer	400 meters	1st	
Men's	2013 Indoor	Kyle Engnell	Distance medley relay	7th	
Men's	2013 Indoor	Stephon Pamilton	Distance medley relay	7th	
Men's	2013 Indoor	Ryan Lynn	Distance medley relay	7th	
Men's	2013 Indoor	Graham Morris	Distance medley relay	7th	
Women's	2013 Indoor	Ashley Spencer	400 meters	3rd	
Women's	2013 Indoor	Samantha Murphy	800 meters	4th	
Women's	2013 Indoor	Stephanie Richartz	Pole vault	8th	
Women's	2013 Indoor	Marissa Golliday	Pentathlon	7th	
Men's	2013 Outdoor	DJ Zahn	4 × 400 meters relay	5th	
Men's	2013 Outdoor	Cam Viney	4 × 400 meters relay	5th	
Men's	2013 Outdoor	Juan Green	4 × 400 meters relay	5th	
Men's	2013 Outdoor	Stephon Pamilton	4 × 400 meters relay	5th	
Women's	2013 Outdoor	Morolake Akinosun	100 meters	8th	
Women's	2013 Outdoor	Ashley Spencer	400 meters	1st	
Women's	2013 Outdoor	Samantha Murphy	800 meters	5th	
Women's	2013 Outdoor	Marissa Golliday	4 × 400 meters relay	th	
Women's	2013 Outdoor	Ahlivia Spencer	4 × 400 meters relay	th	
Women's	2013 Outdoor	Ashley Spencer	4 × 400 meters relay	th	
Women's	2013 Outdoor	Morolake Akinosun	4 × 400 meters relay	th	
Women's	2013 Outdoor	Stephanie Richartz	Pole vault	6th	
Men's	2015 Indoor	DJ Zahn	400 meters	7th	
Men's	2015 Indoor	David Kendziera	4 × 400 meters relay	4th	
Men's	2015 Indoor	Kenneth Allen	4 × 400 meters relay	4th	
Men's	2015 Indoor	Joe McAsey	4 × 400 meters relay	4th	
Men's	2015 Indoor	DJ Zahn	4 × 400 meters relay	4th	
Men's	2015 Indoor	Davis Fraker	Weight throw	8th	
Women's	2015 Indoor	Stephanie Richartz	Pole vault	3rd	
Men's	2015 Outdoor	DJ Zahn	400 meters	3rd	
Men's	2015 Outdoor	David Kendziera	400 meters hurdles	3rd	
Men's	2015 Outdoor	Dylan Lafond	3000 meters steeplechase	7th	
Men's	2015 Outdoor	Molefi Maat	4 × 100 meters relay	7th	
Men's	2015 Outdoor	Brandon Stryganek	4 × 100 meters relay	7th	
Men's	2015 Outdoor	Cole Henderson	4 × 100 meters relay	7th	
Men's	2015 Outdoor	DJ Zahn	4 × 100 meters relay	7th	
Men's	2015 Outdoor	Cam Viney	4 × 400 meters relay	8th	
Men's	2015 Outdoor	David Kendziera	4 × 400 meters relay	8th	
Men's	2015 Outdoor	Joe McAsey	4 × 400 meters relay	8th	
Men's	2015 Outdoor	DJ Zahn	4 × 400 meters relay	8th	
Women's	2015 Outdoor	Stephanie Richartz	Pole vault	3rd	
Men's	2016 Indoor	Jonathan Wells	High jump	8th	
Men's	2017 Indoor	David Kendziera	60 meters hurdles	4th	
Men's	2017 Indoor	Jonathan Wells	Heptathlon	8th	
Women's	2017 Indoor	Pedrya Seymour	60 meters hurdles	3rd	
Men's	2017 Outdoor	David Kendziera	110 meters hurdles	3rd	
Men's	2017 Outdoor	David Kendziera	400 meters hurdles	7th	
Men's	2018 Outdoor	David Kendziera	110 meters hurdles	2nd	
Men's	2018 Outdoor	David Kendziera	400 meters hurdles	3rd	
Men's	2019 Outdoor	Devin Quinn	100 meters	7th	
Men's	2021 Indoor	Manning Plater	Weight throw	3rd	
Men's	2022 Indoor	Jon Davis	Mile run	4th	
Women's	2022 Indoor	Olivia Howell	Mile run	5th	
Men's	2022 Outdoor	Jon Davis	1500 meters	6th	
Men's	2023 Indoor	Tyler Sudduth	Weight throw	8th	
Women's	2023 Indoor	Olivia Howell	Mile run	1st	
Women's	2023 Outdoor	Olivia Howell	1500 meters	8th	
Men's	2024 Indoor	Aiden Ouimet	Heptathlon	4th	
Women's	2024 Indoor	Bara Sajdokova	High jump	5th	
Women's	2024 Indoor	Rose Yeboah	High jump	8th	
Women's	2024 Indoor	Tori Thomas	Pole vault	6th	
Women's	2024 Indoor	Elizabeth Ndudi	Long jump	7th	
Women's	2024 Indoor	Darja Sopova	Triple jump	6th	
Men's	2024 Outdoor	Cody Johnston	Pole vault	5th	
Men's	2024 Outdoor	Tyler Sudduth	Shot put	7th	
Women's	2024 Outdoor	Rose Yeboah	High jump	1st	
Women's	2024 Outdoor	Tori Thomas	Pole vault	7th	
Women's	2024 Outdoor	Darja Sopova	Triple jump	2nd	
Women's	2024 Outdoor	Amber Simpson	Hammer throw	8th	

== See also ==
- Category:Illinois Fighting Illini men's track and field athletes (39)
- Category:Illinois Fighting Illini women's track and field athletes (20)
