= Northwestern Wildcats track and field =

College track and field team

- University: Northwestern University
- Head coach: Mike Muska
- Conference: Big Ten
- Location: Evanston, Illinois
- Outdoor track: Ryan Field
- Nickname: Wildcats
- Colors: Purple and white

The Northwestern Wildcats track and field team was the track and field program that represented Northwestern University. The Wildcats competed in NCAA Division I as a member of the Big Ten Conference. The team was based in Evanston, Illinois at the Ryan Field.

The track and field and cross country teams were dropped by Northwestern University following the 1987-88 seasons. Both the men's and women's programs were coached by Mike Muska until the year before they were discontinued. The track and field program officially encompassed four teams because the NCAA considers men's and women's indoor track and field and outdoor track and field as separate sports.

12 individual national titles were won by Wildcat athletes, including two that won three NCAA national titles each. Jim Golliday won titles in the 100 m and 200 m, while Tom Warne won three pole vault titles.

== Postseason ==
37 Wildcat men have achieved individual first-team All-American status at the Division I men's outdoor, women's outdoor, men's indoor, or women's indoor national championships (using the modern criteria of top-8 placing regardless of athlete nationality). No women achieved NCAA All-American status.

First team NCAA All-Americans
Team	Championships	Name	Event	Place	Ref.
Men's	1921 Outdoor	H.C. Blackwood	Hammer throw	2nd	
Men's	1923 Outdoor	Elbridge Telford	Mile run	6th	
Men's	1923 Outdoor	Stuart Crippen	3000 meters	2nd	
Men's	1925 Outdoor	Alva Martin	800 meters	3rd	
Men's	1925 Outdoor	Sam Campbell	High jump	6th	
Men's	1925 Outdoor	Royal Bouscher	Pole vault	1st	
Men's	1926 Outdoor	Alva Martin	800 meters	1st	
Men's	1926 Outdoor	John Gorby	800 meters	3rd	
Men's	1926 Outdoor	Warren Droegemuller	Pole vault	6th	
Men's	1927 Outdoor	Einar Hermansen	100 meters	3rd	
Men's	1927 Outdoor	Frank Rettig	High jump	6th	
Men's	1927 Outdoor	Warren Droegemuller	Pole vault	1st	
Men's	1927 Outdoor	Tiny Lewis	Shot put	4th	
Men's	1927 Outdoor	Arnold Karsten	Shot put	6th	
Men's	1928 Outdoor	Einar Hermansen	100 meters	6th	
Men's	1928 Outdoor	Rut Walter	400 meters	2nd	
Men's	1928 Outdoor	John Gorby	800 meters	6th	
Men's	1928 Outdoor	Warren Droegemuller	Pole vault	2nd	
Men's	1928 Outdoor	Justin Dart	Hammer throw	3rd	
Men's	1929 Outdoor	Rut Walter	400 meters	1st	
Men's	1929 Outdoor	Tom Warne	Pole vault	1st	
Men's	1930 Outdoor	Rut Walter	400 meters	3rd	
Men's	1930 Outdoor	Ralph Wolf	800 meters	4th	
Men's	1930 Outdoor	Tom Warne	Pole vault	1st	
Men's	1931 Outdoor	Tom Warne	Pole vault	1st	
Men's	1932 Outdoor	Oliver Duggins	220 yards hurdles	6th	
Men's	1935 Outdoor	Phil Doherty	220 yards hurdles	4th	
Men's	1935 Outdoor	Winslow Heg	400 meters	5th	
Men's	1935 Outdoor	Jack Fleming	800 meters	3rd	
Men's	1941 Outdoor	Myron Piker	100 meters	5th	
Men's	1941 Outdoor	Don Smith	High jump	6th	
Men's	1942 Outdoor	Don Smith	High jump	6th	
Men's	1944 Outdoor	Henry Altpeter	200 meters	3rd	
Men's	1944 Outdoor	William Madden	200 meters	4th	
Men's	1944 Outdoor	Henry Altpeter	400 meters	5th	
Men's	1946 Outdoor	Bill Moore	Pole vault	1st	
Men's	1947 Outdoor	Bill Porter	220 yards hurdles	2nd	
Men's	1947 Outdoor	Bill Moore	Pole vault	1st	
Men's	1948 Outdoor	Bill Porter	110 meters hurdles	2nd	
Men's	1948 Outdoor	Jim Holland	Long jump	2nd	
Men's	1949 Outdoor	Jim Holland	Long jump	7th	
Men's	1950 Outdoor	Jim Holland	Long jump	8th	
Men's	1952 Outdoor	Jim Golliday	100 meters	1st	
Men's	1954 Outdoor	Ken Toye	110 meters hurdles	3rd	
Men's	1954 Outdoor	Bob Ehrhart	Pole vault	3rd	
Men's	1955 Outdoor	Jim Golliday	100 meters	1st	
Men's	1955 Outdoor	Jim Golliday	200 meters	1st	
Men's	1956 Outdoor	Ken Toye	110 meters hurdles	7th	
Men's	1965 Indoor	Carl Wallin	Shot put	2nd	
Men's	1968 Outdoor	Ralph Schultz	800 meters	3rd	
Men's	1969 Indoor	Ralph Schultz	1000 meters	4th	
Men's	1969 Outdoor	Ralph Schultz	800 meters	6th	
Men's	1970 Indoor	Dick Taylor	55 meters hurdles	5th	
Men's	1971 Indoor	Dick Taylor	55 meters hurdles	4th	
Men's	1971 Indoor	Tom Sirois	Weight throw	3rd	
Men's	1971 Outdoor	Dick Taylor	110 meters hurdles	4th	
Men's	1972 Indoor	Thomas Bach	1000 meters	2nd	
Men's	1972 Outdoor	Tom Bach	800 meters	4th	
Men's	1981 Outdoor	Doug Peterson	1500 meters	7th	
Men's	1986 Indoor	Mark Keller	4 × 800 meters relay	6th	
Men's	1986 Indoor	Paul Santer	4 × 800 meters relay	6th	
Men's	1986 Indoor	Chuck Croft	4 × 800 meters relay	6th	
Men's	1986 Indoor	Bob Cull	4 × 800 meters relay	6th	

== See also ==
- Category:Northwestern Wildcats men's track and field athletes (9)
- Category:Northwestern Wildcats women's track and field athletes (2)
