= 1954 NCAA track and field championships =

1954 NCAA Track and Field Championships
- Edition: 33rd
- Dates: June 11−12, 1954
- Host city: Ann Arbor, Michigan; University of Michigan
- Venue: Ferry Field

The 1954 NCAA Track and Field Championships were contested June 11−12 at the 33rd annual NCAA-sanctioned track meet to determine the individual and team national champions of men's collegiate track and field in the United States. This year's events were hosted by the University of Michigan at Ferry Field in Ann Arbor.

USC won their sixth consecutive team national championship, the Trojans' 18th title in program history.

== Team result ==
- Note: Top 10 finishers only
- (H) = Hosts

Rank	Team	Points
1st place, gold medalist(s)	USC	66 17/20
2nd place, silver medalist(s)	Illinois	31 17/20
3rd place, bronze medalist(s)	California	27
4	Texas	19
5	Michigan (H)	17 3/5
6	Purdue	17
7	Marquette	16
8	Stanford	15
9	Washington State	14
10	Oregon	12

== See also ==
- NCAA Men's Outdoor Track and Field Championship
- 1953 NCAA Men's Cross Country Championships
