= 1947 NCAA track and field championships =

1947 NCAA Track and Field Championships
- Team Champion: Illinois (5th title)
- Edition: 26th
- Dates: June 20-21, 1947
- Host city: Salt Lake City, Utah
- Venue: Ute Stadium; University of Utah

The 1947 NCAA Track and Field Championships were contested at the 26th annual NCAA-hosted track meet to determine the team and individual national champions of men's collegiate track and field events in the United States. This year's meet was hosted by the University of Utah at Ute Stadium in Salt Lake City.

Illinois repeated as team national champions, capturing their third title in four years and fifth overall.

== Team result ==
- Note: Top 10 only
- (H) = Hosts

Rank	Team	Points
1st place, gold medalist(s)	Illinois	59 2/3
2nd place, silver medalist(s)	Southern California	34 1/4
3rd place, bronze medalist(s)	Minnesota	22
4	Northwestern	21 1/16
5	Baldwin Wallace	21
6	Penn State	20
7	NYU; San Jose State	19
8	Michigan State	16 1/2
9	Indiana; Michigan	16
10	UCLA	14 1/6

== See also ==
- NCAA Men's Outdoor Track and Field Championship
- 1946 NCAA Men's Cross Country Championships
