= 1946 NCAA track and field championships =

1946 NCAA Track and Field Championships
- Team Champion: Illinois (4th title)
- Edition: 25th
- Dates: June 21-22, 1946
- Host city: Minneapolis, Minnesota
- Venue: Memorial Stadium

The 1946 NCAA Track and Field Championships were contested at the 25th annual NCAA-hosted track meet to determine the team and individual national champions of men's collegiate track and field events in the United States. This year's meet was hosted by the University of Minnesota at Memorial Stadium in Minneapolis, Minnesota.

Illinois captured the team championship, their second title in a three years and fourth overall.

== Team result ==
- Note: Top 10 finishers only
- (H) = Hosts

Rank	Team	Points
1st place, gold medalist(s)	Illinois	78
2nd place, silver medalist(s)	USC	42 17/20
3rd place, bronze medalist(s)	NYU	40
4	Baldwin Wallace	20
5	Wisconsin	18 3/4
6	Texas	18
7	Minnesota (H)	13 3/4
8	Indiana	12
9	Ohio State	11
10	Baylor; Marquette; Northwestern; San Jose State; Virginia Union	10

== See also ==
- NCAA Men's Outdoor Track and Field Championship
- 1945 NCAA Men's Cross Country Championships
