= Bobby True =

Liberian middle-distance runner

Personal information
- Full name: Robert True
- Nationality: Liberian
- Born: 5 November 1977 (age 48)

Sport
- Sport: Middle-distance running
- Event: 800 metres

Robert True (born 5 November 1977) is a Liberian middle-distance runner. He competed in the men's 800 metres at the 2000 Summer Olympics.

True sprinted for the Illinois Fighting Illini track and field team in the United States, where he finished 3rd in the 800 m at the 1998 NCAA Division I Indoor Track and Field Championships.
