= Rod Tolbert =

American sprinter

Personal information
- Born: Roderick Lamar Tolbert; June 11, 1967 (age 59)
Medal record
Men's Athletics
Representing the United States
World Indoor Championships
Gold medal – first place	1995 Barcelona	4 × 400 m relay

Roderick Lamar Tolbert (born June 11, 1967) is an American former sprinter.

Tolbert was an All-American sprinter for the Illinois Fighting Illini track and field team, finishing 6th in the 200 m at the 1988 NCAA Division I Indoor Track and Field Championships.

Athletic Accomplishments: Indoor World Champion 1995

4 × 400 m USA

Jr. Pam Am Games Bronze Medalist 1985

Long Jump

3 Times US Olympic Festival Medalist

1989, 1991, 1993

4 Times NCAA All-American

200 m, 4 × 400 m

NCAA Runner-Up

1987 4 × 400 m

12 Times Big Ten Conference Champion

55m, Long Jump, 100 m, 200 m, 4 × 400 m (1986–1989)

6 Times Maryland State Champion (1985)

55m, 300 m, 200 m, Long Jump

PERSONAL BEST: 55m 6.19; 60 m 6.66; 100 m-10.14; 200 m-20.38; 300 m-32.89;
