= Willie Williams (sprinter) =

American sprinter (1931–2019)

Willie Williams (September 12, 1931 – February 27, 2019) was an American sprinter who set the 100 metres world record in 1956 with a new time of 10.1s, one-tenth of a second faster than the record held jointly by 8 men.

== Biography ==
Williams grew up in Gary, Indiana, attending Roosevelt High School where he played football and was first in the state in the 100 yards as a senior. He attended the University of Illinois, from which he gained a degree in physical education. He was in the U.S. army in special services when he broke the world record at the International Military Track Meet in West Berlin in August 1956. He left the army later that year, and became athletics director at Ogden Park, Chicago, before teaching and coaching sports in his home town. He became head track coach at West Side High School, then in 1982 returned to the University of Illinois to coach track. Although he trained the Saudi Arabian Olympic track team in the summer of 1988 for the Seoul Olympics, he declined the opportunity to move to Saudi Arabia and stayed with Illinois, becoming associate head coach in 1997 before retiring in 2000.

He resided in Urbana, Illinois. Williams died on February 27, 2019, at the age of 87.
