= 1927 NCAA Track and Field Championships =

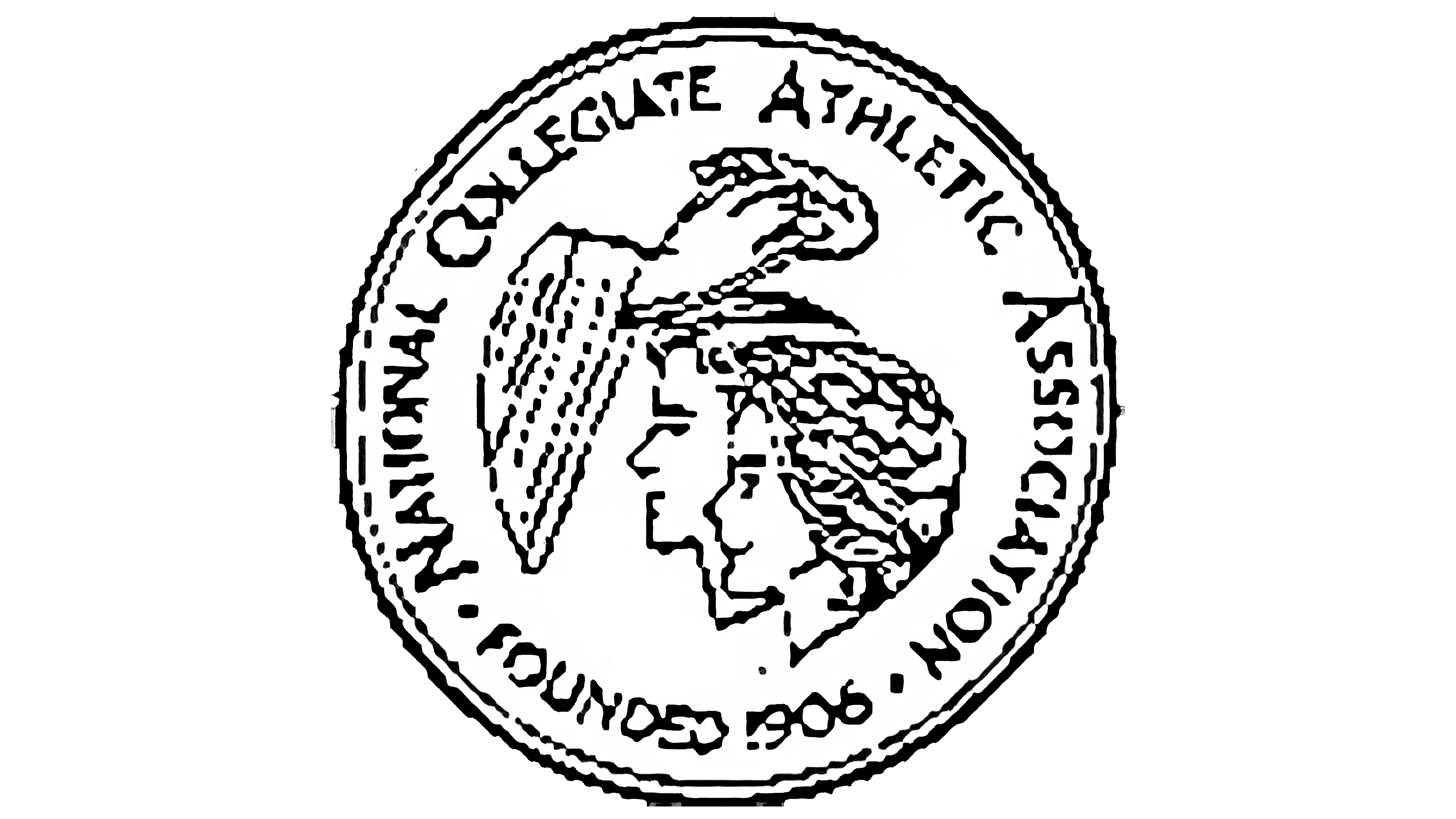
- Team Champion: Illinois (2nd title)
- Edition: 6th
- Dates: June 10-11, 1927
- Host city: (Illinois) Chicago, Illinois; University of Chicago
- Venue: Soldier Field
- Events: 14

The 1927 NCAA Track and Field Championships was the sixth NCAA track and field championship. The meet was held at Soldier Field in Chicago, Illinois in June 1927.

== Team scoring ==
No team championship was recognized at the 1927 event. However, the Associated Press reported that, if team points had been counted, the following universities would have been the points leaders:

1. Illinois - 17-7/10 points
2. Texas - 14 3/4 points
3. Washington - 14 1/3 points
4. Iowa - 13 3/4 points
5. Pittsburgh - 13 points
6. Michigan - 11 points
6. Michigan State - 11 points
7. Northwestern - 10-6/10 points

== Track events ==
100-yard dash
1. Fred Alderman, Michigan St. - 9.9 seconds
2. Dean Anderson, Washington
3. Hermansen, Northwestern
4. Aubrey Cockrell, Texas
5. Wibecan, Pittsburgh
6. Lowell Grady, Kansas

120-yard high hurdles
1. Weems Baskin, Alabama Poly - 14.9 seconds
2. Frank Cuhel, Iowa
3. Ray Dunson, Oklahoma
4. Don McKeever, Illinois
5. George Otterness, Minnesota
6. Charles Doorbos, Kansas

220-yard dash
1. Fred Alderman, Michigan St. - 21.1 seconds
2. Lowell Grady, Kansas
3. Della Maria, Notre Dame
4. John Everingham, Iowa
5. Bohn Grim, Michigan St.
6. Aubrey Cockrell, Texas

220-yard low hurdles
1. Edwin Spence, College of City of Detroit (Wayne State) - 23.4 seconds (NCAA record)
2. Frank Cuhel, Iowa
3. Reay, Carelton
4. Goeriz, Hillsdale
5. William Shelley, Washington
6. Paul Toolin, New Hampshire

440-yard dash
1. Herman Phillips, Butler 48.5 (NCAA record)
2. Ed Haynes, Denver
3. Butler, Geneva
4. Ernest Knotz, Georgia Tech
5. Ben Brite, Southwest Texas State Teachers
6. Ed Peltret, Washington

880-yard run
1. John Sittig, Illinois - 1:54.2 (NCAA record)
2. Jim Charteris, Washington
3.Virgil Gist, Chicago
4. Lindus Caulum, Iowa St.
5. Glenn Johnson, Nebraska
6. Emmett Brunson, Rice Institute

One-mile run
1. Ray Conger, Iowa St. - 4:17.6 (NCAA record)
2. Galen Elliott, North Carolina
3. Emmett Brunson, Rice Institute
4. Burke, Utah Aggies
5. Hooper, SMU
6. Jim Little, Purdue

Two-mile run
1. Melvin Shimek, Marquette - 9:34.4
2. Harold Kennedy, Ohio St.
3. Poco Frazier, Kansas
4. Arnold Gillette, Montana
5. Ray Hall, Illinois
6. Harold Fields, Indiana

== Field events ==
Broad jump
1. Ed Hamm, Georgia Tech - 24 feet, 1 inch
2. Joseph Simon, Illinois
3. C.B. Smith, Texas
4. McCormick, Hendrix
5. Arthur Meislahn, Illinois
6. Williams Mullins, Oklahoma

High jump
1. Anton Burg, Chicago - 6 feet, 5 1/2 inches
1. Garland Shepherd, Texas - 6 feet, 5 1/2 inches
3. Summerfield Brunk, Drake
5. Geer, Doane
5. Nolder, Illinois Normal
6. McCormick, Hendrix
6. John Kingerly, Iowa St.
6. Rettig, Northwestern
6. Ted Wachowski, Illinois

Pole vault
1. William Droegemueller, Northwestern 13 feet
2. J.B. O'Dell, Clemson
2. Claude Dailey, SW Texas St Teachers
2. Frank Glaser, Marquette
2. Frank Wirsig, Nebraska
2. Xavier Boyles, Iowa
2. Ralph Hammons, Texas

Discus throw
1. James Corson, College of Pacific - 144 feet, 2 inches
2. Welch, Pittsburgh
3. Tiny Gooch, Texas
4. Jack Taylor, Baylor
5. Cecil Mau, Iowa
6. Peter Rasmus, Ohio St.

Javelin
1. Doral Pilling, Utah - 199 feet, 8 inches
2. Jack Lovette, Michigan
3. Lee Bartlett, Albion
4. Wilmer Rinehart, Indiana
5. Dunkak, South Dakota
6. Fred Stuttle, Illinois

Shot put
1. Herman Brix, Washington - 48 feet, 7 5/8 inches
2. Daniel Lyon, Illinois
3. Forest Rinefort, Grinnell
4. Leland Lewis, Northwestern
5. Jack Lovette, Michigan
6. Karsten, Northwestern

Hammer throw
1. Dan Gwinn, Pittsburgh - 155 feet, 8 inches
2. Holly Campbell, Michigan
3. Howard Linn, Pittsburgh
4. Wilford Ketz, Michigan
5. Vern Lapp, Iowa
6. Olwin, Chicago

== See also ==
- NCAA Men's Outdoor Track and Field Championship
