= 1953 NCAA cross country championships =

1953 cross-country running meet of the NCAA

1953 NCAA Cross Country Championships
- Organisers: NCAA
- Edition: 15th
- Date: November 23, 1953
- Host city: East Lansing, MI; Michigan State College
- Venue: Forest Akers East Golf Course
- Distances: 4 miles (6.4 km)
- Participation: 99 athletes

The 1953 NCAA Cross Country Championships were the 15th annual cross country meet to determine the team and individual national champions of men's collegiate cross country running in the United States.

Since the current multi-division format for NCAA championship did not begin until 1973, all NCAA members were eligible. In total, 11 teams and 99 individual runners contested this championship.

The meet was hosted by Michigan State College on November 23, 1953, at the Forest Akers East Golf Course in East Lansing, Michigan. The distance for the race was 4 miles (6.4 kilometers).

The team national championship was won by the Kansas Jayhawks, their first. The individual championship was won by Wes Santee, also from Kansas, with a time of 19:43.74.

== Men's title ==
- Distance: 4 miles (6.4 kilometers)

=== Team Result (Top 10) ===
Rank	Team	Points
1st place, gold medalist(s)	Kansas	70
2nd place, silver medalist(s)	Indiana	81
3rd place, bronze medalist(s)	Syracuse	93
4	Penn State	97
5	Pittsburgh	104
6	Michigan State College	125
7	South Dakota State	163
8	Wisconsin	175
9	Miami (OH)	184
10	Oberlin	261
