= Sprint hurdles at the NCAA Division I Outdoor Track and Field Championships =

The sprint hurdles at the NCAA Division I Outdoor Track and Field Championships have been contested over a variety of distances. The men's 110 meter hurdles or its imperial equivalent (the 120 yard hurdles) has been present on the schedule since the first edition in 1921. A men's 220 yard hurdles was also held from 1921 to 1959. The women's 100 meter hurdles has been held since the first women's championships in 1982.

== Women's 100 meter hurdles ==
This is a list of the NCAA outdoor champions in the 100 meter hurdles event.

Key
w=wind aided
A=Altitude assisted

Year	Name	Nationality	Team	Time + wind
1982	Benita Fitzgerald	United States	Tennessee	13.13
1983	Benita Fitzgerald	United States	Tennessee	12.84
1984	Kim Turner	United States	UTEP	13.02w
1985	Rhonda Blanford	United States	Nebraska	12.70w
1986	Rosalind Pendergraft-Council	United States	Auburn	13.03
1987	LaVonna Martin	United States	Tennessee	13.05
1988	Lynda Tolbert	United States	Arizona St	12.82
1989	Tananjalyn Stanley	United States	Louisiana St	12.70
1990	Lynda Tolbert	United States	Arizona St	12.84w
1991	Dawn Bowles	United States	Louisiana St	12.70w
1992	Michelle Freeman	Jamaica	Florida	12.90
1993	Gillian Russell	Jamaica	Miami Fl	13.02
1994	Gillian Russell	Jamaica	Miami Fl	12.97
1995	Gillian Russell	Jamaica	Miami Fl	12.99
1996	Kim Carson	United States	Louisiana St	12.82w
1997	Astia Walker	Jamaica	Louisiana St	12.85
1998	Angie Vaughn	United States	Texas	12.82w
1999	Yolanda McCray	United States	Miami Fl	12.85
2000	Joyce Bates	United States	Louisiana St	12.85
2001	Donica Merriman	United States	Ohio St	12.73w
2002	Perdita Felicien	Canada	Illinois	12.91
2003	Perdita Felicien	Canada	Illinois	12.74
2004	Nichole Denby	United States	Texas	12.62
2005	Virginia Powell	United States	Southern Cal	12.80
2006	Virginia Powell	United States	Southern Cal	12.48
2007	Tiffany Ofili	United States	Michigan	12.80
2008	Tiffany Ofili	United States	Michigan	12.84 (−2.8 m/s)
2009	Tiffany Ofili	United States	Michigan	12.96
2010	Queen Quedith Harrison	United States	Virginia Tech	12.67 (+1.8 m/s)
2011	Nia Ali	United States	USC	12.63
2012	Christina Manning	United States	Ohio State	12.89
2013	Brianna Rollins	United States	Clemson	12.39
2014	Sharika Nelvis	United States	Arkansas State	12.52
2015	Kendra Harrison	United States	Kentucky	12.55 (+1.7 m/s)
2016	Jasmine Camacho-Quinn	Puerto Rico	Kentucky	12.54w (+3.8 m/s)
2017	Tobi Amusan	Nigeria	UTEP	12.57 (+1.6 m/s)
2018	Jasmine Camacho-Quinn	Puerto Rico	Kentucky	12.70 (+0.9 m/s)
2019	Janeek Brown	Jamaica	Arkansas	12.40 (+0.6 m/s)
2021	Anna Cockrell	United States	USC	12.58 (+0.4 m/s)
2022	Alia Armstrong	United States	LSU	12.57 (−0.2 m/s)
2023	Ackera Nugent	Jamaica	Arkansas	12.25w (+3.8 m/s)
2024	Grace Stark	United States	Florida	12.47 (−0.5 m/s)
2025	Aaliyah McCormick	United States	Oregon	12.81 (−0.2 m/s)
2026	Aaliyah McCormick	United States	Oregon	12.47 (+1.2 m/s)

== Men's 120 yard hurdles and 110 meter hurdles ==
This is a list of the NCAA outdoor champions in the 120 yard hurdles until 1975, with the metric 110 meter hurdles being contested in Olympic years starting in 1932. Metrication occurred in 1976, so all subsequent championships were at the metric distance. Hand timing was used until 1973, while starting in 1974 fully automatic timing was used. The height of the hurdles and the spacing between the two races are identical – 110 meters is 29 centimetres (11 in) longer from the last hurdle to the finish line.

Key
y=yards
w=wind aided
A=Altitude assisted

Year	Name, (Country)	Team	Time
1921	Earl Thomson Canada	Dartmouth	14.4y
1922	Harold Barron	Penn St	15.4y
1923	Ivan Riley	Kansas St	15.2y
1924	Not held		
1925	Hugo Leistner	Stanford	14.6y
1926	George Guthrie	Ohio St	14.8y
1927	Weems Baskin	Auburn	14.9y
1928	Dwight Kane	Ohio Wesleyan	14.7y
1929	Richard Rockaway	Ohio St	14.7y
1930	Steve Anderson	Washington	14.4y
1931	Jack Keller	Ohio St	14.6y
1932	George Saling	Iowa	14.2
1933	August Meier	Stanford	14.2y
1934	Sam Klopstock	Stanford	14.4y
1935	Sam Allen	Oklahoma Baptist	14.5y
1936	Forrest "Spec" Towns	Georgia	14.3
1937	Forrest "Spec" Towns	Georgia	14.3y
1938	Fred Wolcott	Rice	14.1y
1939	Fred Wolcott	Rice	14.2y
1940	Ed Dugger	Tufts	13.9y
1941	Robert Wright	Ohio St	14.0y
1942	Robert Wright	Ohio St	14.2y
1943	Bill Cummins	Rice	14.6y
1944	David Nichols	Illinois	15.3y
1945	George Walker	Illinois	14.9y
1946	Harrison Dillard	Baldwin-Wallace	14.1y
1947	Harrison Dillard	Baldwin-Wallace	14.1yA
1948	Clyde Scott	Arkansas	13.7
1949	Craig Dixon	UCLA	13.9y
1950	Dick Attlesey	Southern Cal	14.0y
1951	Jack Davis	Southern Cal	13.7y
1952	Jack Davis	Southern Cal	14
1953	Jack Davis	Southern Cal	14.0y
1954	Willard Thomson	Illinois	14.2y
1955	Milt Campbell	Indiana	13.9y
1956	Lee Calhoun	NC Central	13.7
1957	Lee Calhoun	NC Central	13.6y
1958	Elias Gilbert	Winston-Salem	13.9y
1959	Hayes Jones	Eastern Mich	13.6y
1960	Jim Johnson	UCLA	14
1961	Jerry Tarr	Oregon	13.9y
1962	Jerry Tarr	Oregon	13.5yw
1963	Robert Green	Southern Illinois	14.1Ay
1964	Bobby May	Rice	13.7
1965	Paul Kerry	Southern Cal	13.9y
1966	Ron Copeland	UCLA	13.73y
1967	Earl McCullouch	Southern Cal	13.4Ay
1968	Earl McCullouch	Southern Cal	13.4
1969	Ervin Hall	Villanova	13.3y
1970	Paul Gibson	UTEP	13.6y
1971	Rod Milburn	Southern-BR	13.6y
1972	Jerry Wilson	Southern Cal	13.4
1973	Rod Milburn	Southern-BR	13.1y
1974	Charles Foster	NC Central	13.35yw
1975	Larry Shipp	Louisiana St	13.91Ay
1976	Dedy Cooper	San Jose St	13.89
1977	James Owens	UCLA	13.49
1978	Greg Foster	UCLA	13.22
1979	Renaldo Nehemiah	Maryland	12.91w
1980	Greg Foster	UCLA	13.42
1981	Larry Cowling	California	13.60w
1982	Milan Stewart	Southern Cal	13.53A
1983	Roger Kingdom	Pittsburgh	13.54
1984	Albert Lane	Missouri	13.61
1985	Henry Andrade	Southern Meth	13.43w
1986	Keith Talley	Alabama	13.36
1987	Eric Reid	Louisiana St	13.51
1988	James Purvis	Georgia Tech	13.58
1989	Robert Reading	Southern Cal	13.19Aw
1990	Chris Lancaster	Indiana St	13.45
1991	Greg Williams Jamaica	Texas A&M	13.55w
1992	Mark Crear	Southern Cal	13.49
1993	Glenn Terry	Indiana	13.43
1994	Robert Foster Jamaica	Fresno St	13.53
1995	Duane Ross	Clemson	13.32
1996	Dominique Arnold	Wash St	13.46
1997	Reggie Torian	Wisconsin	13.39
1998	Larry Wade	Texas A&M	13.37w
1999	Terrence Trammell	South Carolina	13.45
2000	Terrence Trammell	South Carolina	13.43
2001	Ron Bramlett	Alabama	13.54w
2002	Ron Bramlett	Alabama	13.49
2003	Ryan Wilson	Southern Cal	13.35
2004	Josh Walker	Florida	13.32
2005	Josh Walker	Florida	13.39
2006	Aries Merritt	Tennessee	13.21
2007	Tyron Akins	Auburn	13.42 (−1.0 m/s)
2008	Jason Richardson	South Carolina	13.40 (−1.0 m/s)
2009	Ronnie Ash	Bethune–Cookman	13.27 (−2.0 m/s)
2010	Andrew Riley Jamaica	Illinois	13.45 (+1.7 m/s)
2011	Barrett Nugent	LSU	13.28w (+3.6 m/s)
2012	Andrew Riley	Illinois	13.30 (−3.5 m/s)
2013	Wayne Davis II	Texas A&M	13.14w (+3.8 m/s)
2014	Devon Allen	Oregon	13.16
2015	Omar McLeod Jamaica	Arkansas	13.01w (+3.9 m/s)
2016	Devon Allen	Oregon	13.50 (−0.9 m/s)
2017	Grant Holloway	Florida	13.49 (−2.0 m/s)
2018	Grant Holloway	Florida	13.42 (−1.1 m/s)
2019	Grant Holloway	Florida	12.98 (+0.8 m/s)
2020	not held		
2021	Robert Dunning	Alabama	13.25 (−0.6 m/s)
2022	Trey Cunningham	Florida State	13.00 (±0.0 m/s)
2023	Phillip Lemonious	Arkansas	13.24 (+1.8 m/s)
2024	Darius Luff (USA)	Nebraska	13.19 (+0.1 m/s)
2025	Ja'Kobe Tharp (USA)	Auburn	13.05 (+0.1 m/s)
2026	Ja'Kobe Tharp (USA)	Auburn	12.90 (−0.2 m/s)

== Men's 220 yard hurdles ==
This is a list of the NCAA outdoor champions in the 220 yard low hurdles until they were discontinued in 1959. Hand timing was used throughout the duration of this event. The event was not held in the Olympic years of 1924, 1948, 1952 and 1956, in favor of the 400 metres hurdles. It was held in the Olympic year of 1936, and was part of Jesse Owens' multi-world-record-breaking meet.

Key
y=yards
w=wind aided
A=Altitude assisted

Year	Name, (Country)	Team	Time
1921	August Desch	Notre Dame	24.8
1922	Charles Brookins	Iowa	24.2
1923	Charles Brookins	Iowa	23.6
1924	not held		
1925	Morgan Taylor	Grinnell	24
1926	Edward Spence	Wayne St MI	23.5
1927	Edward Spence	Wayne St MI	23.4
1928	Frank Cuhel	Iowa	23.2
1929	Steve Anderson	Washington	23.5
1930	Lee Sentman	Illinois	23.2
1931	Jack Keller	Ohio St	23.8
1932	Jack Keller	Ohio St	22.7
1933	Glenn Hardin	Louisiana St	22.9
1934	Glenn Hardin	Louisiana St	22.7
1935	Jesse Owens	Ohio St	23.4
1936	Jesse Owens	Ohio St	23.1
1937	Earl Vickery	Southern Cal	23.3
1938	Fred Wolcott	Rice	23.3
1939	Fred Wolcott	Rice	23
1940	Fred Wolcott	Rice	23.1
1941	Robert Wright	Ohio St	23.4
1942	Robert Wright	Ohio St	23.7
1943	Bill Cummins	Rice	23.9
1944	Elmore Harris	Morgan St	23.9
1945	George Walker	Illinois	24
1946	Harrison Dillard	Baldwin-Wallace	23
1947	Harrison Dillard	Baldwin-Wallace	22.3A
1948	not held		
1949	Craig Dixon	UCLA	22.7
1950	Bill Albans	North Carolina	23.8
1951	Charles Moore	Cornell	22.7
1952	not held		
1953	Jack Davis	Southern Cal	23.3
1954	Joe Corley	Illinois	22.6
1955	Charles Pratt	Manhattan	23.1
1956	not held		
1957	Ancel Robinson	Fresno St	22.2
1958	Charlie Tidwell	Kansas	22.7
1959	Hayes Jones	Eastern Mich	22.5w
