= John Sittig =

American middle-distance runner

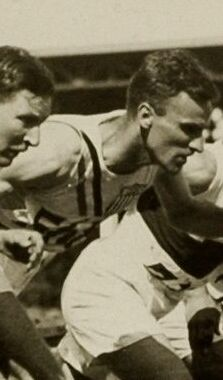
- John Sittig in 1928

Personal information
- Nationality: American
- Born: January 29, 1905
- Died: December 26, 1984 (aged 79)

Sport
- Sport: Middle-distance running
- Event: 800 metres

John Sittig (January 29, 1905 – December 26, 1984) was an American middle-distance runner. He competed in the men's 800 metres at the 1928 Summer Olympics.

Competing for the Illinois Fighting Illini track and field team, Sittig won the 1927 NCAA Track and Field Championships over 880 yards.
