= Angela Bizzarri =

American distance runner

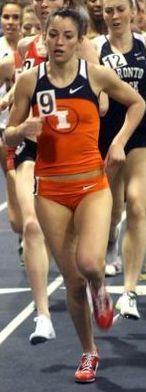
- Angela Bizarri (front) competing for Illinois at the Notre Dame Invitational

Personal information
- Nationality: American
- Born: February 15, 1988 (age 38) Mason, Ohio

Sport
- Country: United States of America
- Sport: Cross country and Track and Field
- Event(s): 1500m, 3000m, 5000m
- College team: University of Illinois
- Coached by: Jeremy Rasmussen (College); Terrence Mahone (Brooks)

Achievements and titles
- National finals: 5000m Champion (Outdoor Track 2009); Cross Country Champion (NCAA Cross Country 2009); 3000m Champion (Indoor Track 2010)

Angela Bizzarri Pflugrath is a Doctor of Osteopathic Medicine (DO) and a former American distance runner. She competed for the University of Illinois (2006–2010) and won three NCAA national championships: in Cross Country, as well as in the 5000 meters (outdoor) and 3000 meters (indoor). As an Illini she earned nine All-American honours and five Big Ten Conference titles. She also holds Illini records in the 1500 meters, 3000 meters, 5000 meters (outdoor), 5000 meters (indoor), the mile, and, in Cross Country, the 6000 meters.

Bizzarri ran professionally for Brooks Sports and trained in San Diego, then moved to Seattle to train with Danny Mackey's Brooks Beasts group.

== High school ==
Bizzarri attended William Mason High School (Mason, Ohio). She was the Ohio D1 state champion for cross country in 2002 and 2004. She was the Ohio D1 Track and Field state champion in the 3,200m from 2003-2006 and took first in the 1600m at the 2006 state meet. She helped her team to the Ohio Division 1 state title in 2004. She was a four-time letter winner in both cross country and track and field." Her coaches were Jeff Branham and Kelly Affatato.

== College ==
=== Freshman Year ===
Cross Country: As a freshman in 2006, Bizzarri finished 24th at the NCAA Cross Country meet, earning All-American honors. She ran 21:18 on the Terre Haute NCAA course. She was the runner-up in the Midwest Regional meet, running 20:49 and earning all-region honors. She was fifth in the Big Ten Conference meet with a time of 20:49, earning all-conference honors. At the Pre-National meet, she ran her 6k personal best for the season, 20:26 and finishing eighth. She was the Big Ten Runner of the week after winning her collegiate debut at the Brissman-Lundeen Invite. Angela was Illinois' top runner in every cross country race.

Indoor Track: Bizzarri was third in the Big Ten Championship Mile.

Outdoor Track: Bizzarri qualified and competed in the NCAA Championships in the 1500m. She ran her season-best of 4:20.96 in the 1,500m in prelims at the NCAA Mideast Regional Championships. She placed 11th in the 1,500m at the Big Ten Championships with a time of 4:25.09. She also ran the 3,000m at the USA Junior meet.

=== Sophomore Year ===
Cross Country: Bizzarri placed 14th at the NCAA Cross Country Championships in 20:35. This helped place the Illini team 6th overall and gave Bizzarri her second All-American honor. She was second at Midwest Regionals, running 20:03, and gaining All-Region honors. She finished third in the Big Ten meet, earning an All-conference status and running 19:59. She also finished fourth in the Pre-National meet at Terre Haute. She was named Academic All-Big Ten.

Indoor Track: Bizzarri earned her third All-American honor, anchoring the mile leg of the Illini distance medley relay to a sixth-place finish with an overall time of 11:12. At the Alex Wilson Invitational, she helped the distance medley set a school record of 11:09.09, winning the race. At the Big Ten Championships, she placed fifth in the 3000m (9:23.03) and fifth in the mile (4:47.76). She ran her fastest mile of 4:41.98 at the Iowa State Classic.

Outdoor Track: Bizzarri qualified for the U.S. Olympic Trials and made the finals, where she finished 13th. She ran her season-best of 15:45.78 in the Prelims and ran 16:03.99 in the finals. At the NCAA meet, she finished second in the 5000m with a time of 15:46.08, earning All-American honors. She won the Midwest Regional Title in the 5000m in 16:24.38. She was second in the 5000m at the Big Ten meet (16:27.73), and fifth in the 1500m(4:25.30). She ran her season-best 1500m of 4:19.95 at the Sun Angel Track Classic. She was also awarded the Big Ten Track Athlete of the Week after winning the 5000m at the Brutus Hamilton Invite in a time of 16:16.43. She received the Dike Eddleman Award as the Illinois Female Athlete of the Year as well.

=== Junior Year ===
Cross Country: Bizzarri finished sixth at the National NCAA meet, running 19:59 and earning All-American honors, setting the new school record. This helped her team to a "" finish. She finished third in the Midwest Regional. She was seventh in the Big Ten Meet, running 20:52. She finished 14th at Pre-Nationals (20:47) in her season opener. She was recovering from injury during the early season. She earned Academic All-Big Ten.

Indoor Track: Bizzarri was fourth in the 3000m of the NCAA Championships (9:15.50). She placed second in the 3000m (9:20.77) and fourth in the 5000m (16:07.50) at the Big Ten Championships. Her 5000m performance was her first indoor 5k and she broke the school record. She also broke the 3000m indoor school record at the Meyo Invitational (9:11.62).

Outdoor Track: Bizzarri took third in the 5,000m at the USA Championships with a personal-best time of 15:33.02. At the NCAA National meet, she won the 5000m in 16:17.94. She won the Midwest Regional 5000m (16:11.00) setting a new meet record. At the Big Ten meet, she won the 5000m (15:54.86) title and placed second in the 1500m (4:16.86), setting a new 1500m school record. She placed third in the 5000m at the Mt. Sac invitational, running 15:37.39. She received her second Dike Eddleman Award as the University of Illinois Female Athlete of the Year. She was named a second-team Academic All-American by ESPN. She also received an Academic All-Big Ten award.

=== Senior Year ===
Cross Country: Bizzarri won the NCAA Cross Country national title with a personal best and new school record of 19:46. She earned All-American status once again and became the first female Illini to win a Cross Country national title. She won Midwest Regionals as well, in 20:07.5. She finished second at the Big Ten Meet with a time of 20:10. She won the Pre-National meet in 20:27.8. She finished second at the Wisconsin Inter-Regional meet with a 5k time of 17:22. Her season opener was the Harry Groves Spiked Shoe Invite in a time of 22:16. During her impressive senior Cross Country season, Angela was named the National Cross Country Athlete of the Year by the USATF, earned the Honda Sports Award for Cross Country, was named Midwest Region Athlete of the year, and was named Big Ten Runner of the Week on October 20 after her win at Pre-Nationals. She again also earned Academic All-Big Ten honors. She was named the Division I female cross country Scholar-Athlete of the Year for the 2009 season.

Indoor Track: Bizzarri won her third national title in the NCAA 3000m, breaking her own school record with a time of 8:57.40, just edging out Lisa Koll of Iowa State University by 12 hundredths of a second. At the Big Ten Conference meet, she won both the 3000m (9:10.16) and the 5000m (16:06.88), setting a new 5000m school record. She also tied the school record in the mile (4:40.68) at the Tyson Invitational.

Outdoor Track: Bizzarri placed 5th in the 5000m (15:39.81) at the USA Championships. Angela tried to reach the world championships B-standard of 15:25, but she fell short (15:57) in her only attempt on July 15 in Liege, Belgium. She qualified and ran the 5000m at the NCAA championships, but did not finish the race. She won her West Regional race in the 5000m with a time of 16:33.81. At the Big Ten Conference meet, Angela won the 1500m in 4:15.42, setting a new school record and beating out Gabriele Anderson of Minnesota by 1 hundredth of a second. She also won the conference 5000m (16:12.35). She ran her fastest 5000m of the season at the Stanford's Payton Jordan Cardinal Invitational. She placed second in the 1,500m at the Sun Angel Classic and sixth in the 1,500m-special race at the Drake Relays. She earned her third Dike Eddleman Award, was named first-team Academic All-American by ESPN magazine, and was named Academic All-Big Ten.

In 2019, she was inducted into the University of Illinois Athletics Hall of Fame.

=== University of Illinois Athletic Accolades ===
Bizzarri's awards and titles as an Illini:

- Three-time NCAA champion (outdoor 5,000m, cross country, indoor 3,000m)
- Three-time University of Illinois Dike Eddleman Female Athlete of the Year
- Nine-time All-American
- Five-time Big Ten Champion
- 2009 USTFCCCA National Cross Country Athlete of the Year
- 2009–10 Honda Sports Award Winner for cross country
- 2009 Big Ten Outdoor Track Athlete of the Year
- Seven-time school record-holder
- Two-time Academic All-American
- Six-time Academic All-Big Ten

== University of Illinois Best Times ==
Event	Time	Place	Date	U of I School Record
1500 m (outdoor)	4:11.26		2011	yes
5,000 m (outdoor)	15:16.04		2011	yes
3000 m (indoor)	8:57.40	NCAA Indoor Championships University of Arkansas	March 13, 2010	yes
5,000 m (indoor)	16:06.88	Big Ten Championships Purdue University	February 28, 2010	yes
Mile (indoor)	4:40.68	Tyson Invitational University of Arkansas	February 12, 2010	yes
6000m (cross country)	19:46.8	NCAA Cross Country Championships Indiana State University	October 23, 2009	yes

== Professional ==
Bizzarri signed with Brooks Sports after her collegiate career in 2010. She was training with the Mammoth Track Club until late summer 2012. After a short stint in San Diego, she moved to Seattle to be coached by Danny Mackey.

== Personal ==
She earned her Molecular and Cellular Biology degree from the University of Illinois in the fall of 2010 and began competing for Brooks in the spring outdoor track season of 2011.

In 2019, she was inducted into the University of Illinois Athletics Hall of Fame.

Bizzarri Pflugrath and her husband, Karl, live in Vallejo, California, where she finished medical school at Touro University California majoring in Osteopathic Medicine. She is currently a Doctor of Osteopathic Medicine at Valley Children's Healthcare in California.

=== 2014 ===
- Bizzarri ran a 5000m in 15:36.78 at Stanford University Payton Jordan Invitational in Palo Alto (USA) on 04.05.2014.
- Bizzarri ran a 1500m in 4:11.63 at Portland Track Festival in Portland, Oregon (USA) on 15.06.2014.
- Bizzarri finished 11th in 5000m in 15:59.02 at USA Outdoor Track and Field Championships in Sacramento, California.
- Bizzarri ran a 4:34 Liberty mile to finish 4th on August 1.

=== 2015 ===
Bizzarri ran at Stanford University twice:

- In April, she ran a 10,000 meters in 32:26.98
- In May, she ran a 5000 meters in 15:30.00.

=== 2016 ===
Bizzarri ran at Stanford University:

- In May, she ran a 10,000 meters in 33:04.10.
- Bizzarri ran 5000 meters in 15:57.10 at Portland Track Festival at Lewis and Clark College in Portland, Oregon (USA) on 12.06.2016.
