= Joel McNulty =

American hurdler

Joel M. McNulty (born 20 August 1931) was an American track and field athlete, who was active in the 1950s. A world class amateur hurdler, McNulty was an All Time Big Ten Conference Men’s Track and Field Winner. McNulty excelled at the 120y (now 110m) and 220y (obsolete) Hurdles. While at the University of Illinois, McNulty won Big Ten Conference, Track and Field (outdoor), competitions no fewer than 3 times (1952, 120y Hurdles, 14.4, and 1952 and 1953, 220y Hurdles, 24.8, both times). McNulty attended the University of Illinois on a scholarship as a sprinter. He, eventually, received both a B.S. and LL.B. from the University, was admitted to the bar in 1959 and, thereafter, had a long career as a business lawyer. McNulty was Alpha Tau Omega.

== See also ==
List of hurdlers
