= David Kendziera =

American hurdler (born 1994)

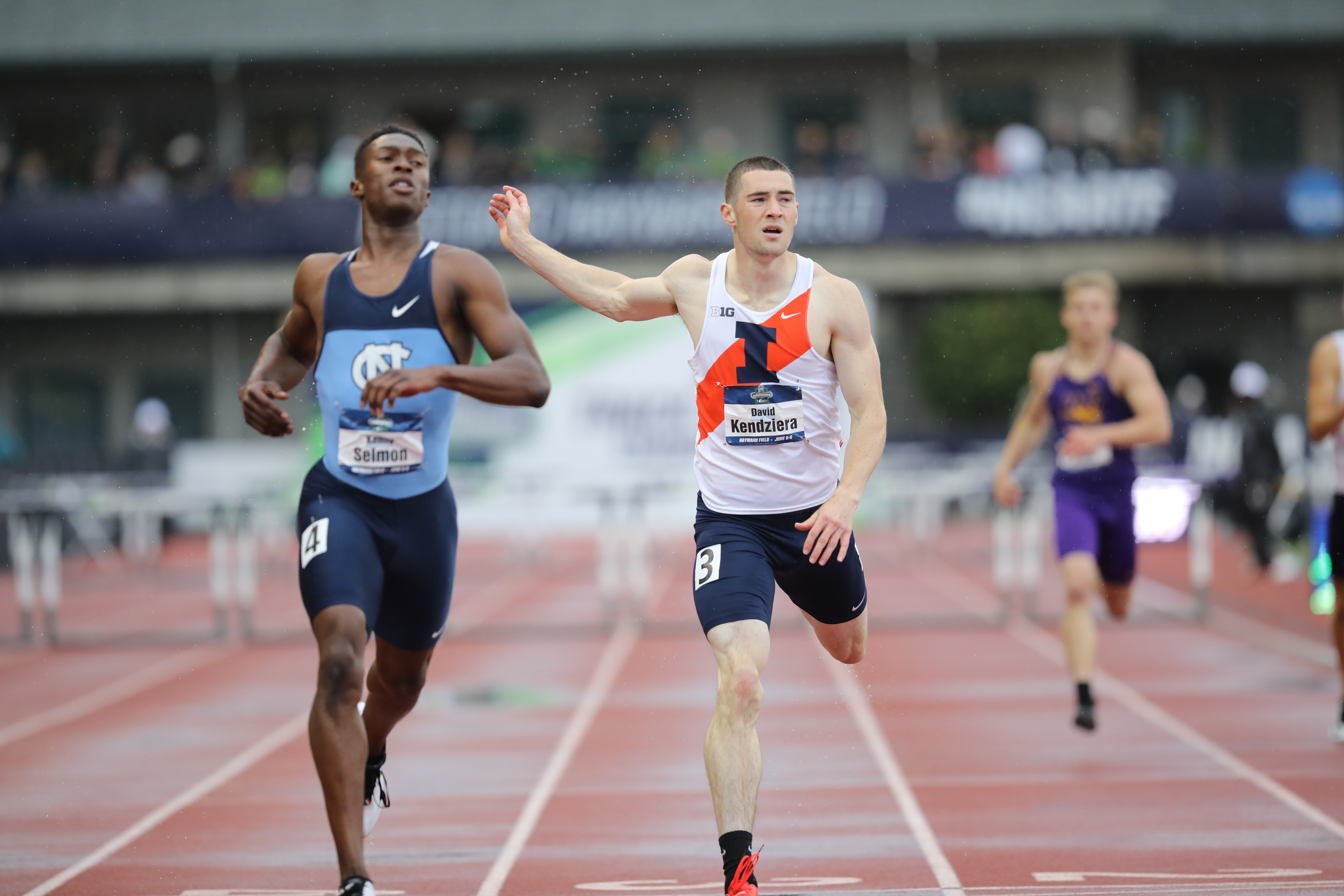
- Kendziera (right) in 2018

Personal information
- Born: September 9, 1994 (age 31) Arlington Heights, Illinois, United States

Sport
- Country: United States
- Sport: Track and field
- Event(s): 110 m hurdles, 400 m hurdles
- College team: Illinois Fighting Illini

Achievements and titles
- Personal bests: 400 m: 46.67 (Baton Rouge 2020); 110 mH: 13.39 (Eugene 2017); 400 mH: 48.38 (Eugene 2021)

David Kendziera (born 9 September 1994) is an American Olympic athlete who runs the 400m hurdles and 110m hurdles.

== Early life ==
From Mount Prospect, Illinois, he attended Prospect High School and the University of Illinois.

== Career ==
Competing at collegiate level, he was a 10 time NCAA All-American and 4 time NCAA Championship medalist. Kendzeira finished third at the 2015 NCAA Division I Outdoor Track and Field Championships running 49.56. At the 2017 NCAA Division I Outdoor Track and Field Championships he finished third in the 110m hurdles in a time of 13.59, and 7th in the 400m hurdles. At the 2018 NCAA Division I Outdoor Track and Field Championships he finished second in the 110m hurdles, and third in the 400m hurdles.

At the 2019 Meeting de Paris he finished sixth in the 400m hurdles in a time of 49.16. At the 2019 Prefontaine Classic he finished fourth in the 400m hurdles in a time of 49.46. In Minsk, Belarus in September 2019 he won the 400m hurdles in The Match Europe v USA.

On September 17, 2020, in the Stadio Olimpico in Rome Kendziera ran 49.35 placing him in the top ten for the year worldwide.

On June 26, 2021, the Mount Prospect, IL native qualified for the Tokyo Olympics in the 400m hurdles after setting a personal record of 48.38 seconds and placing third in the finals at the US Olympic Trials.

On July 29, 2021, Kendziera placed fourth in the 400m hurdles quarterfinals in the Tokyo Olympics and qualified for the semi-finals.

Competing at the 2023 USA Outdoor Track and Field Championships, in Eugene, Oregon, he qualified for the finals and finished seventh in the 400m hurdles.
