= 1926 NCAA Track and Field Championships =

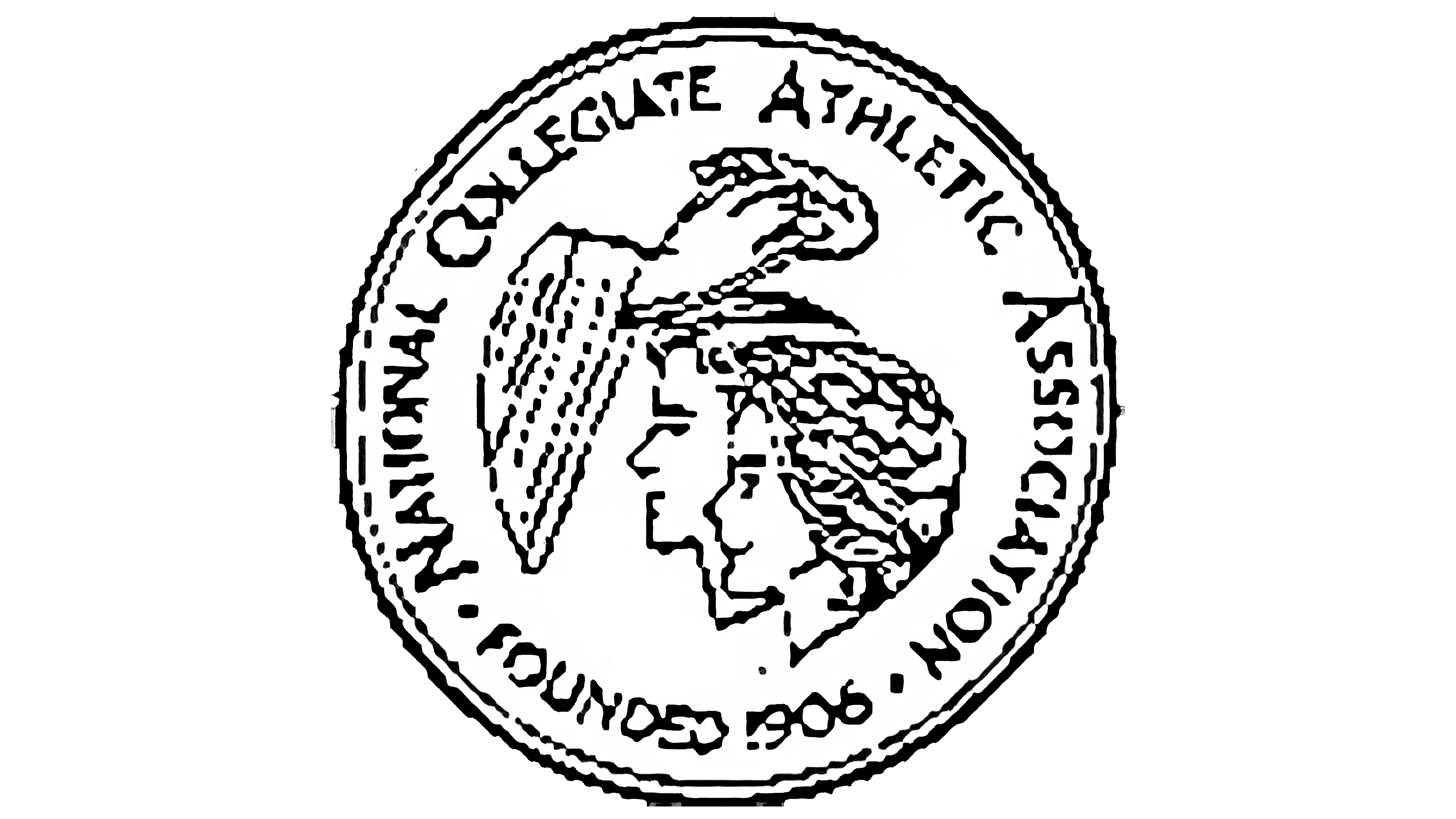
- Team Champion: USC (1st title)
- Edition: 5th
- Dates: June 11-12, 1926
- Host city: (Illinois) Chicago, Illinois; University of Chicago
- Venue: Soldier Field
- Events: 14

The 1926 NCAA Track and Field Championships was the fifth NCAA track and field championship. Athletes representing 65 universities participated in the event, which was held at Soldier Field in Chicago, Illinois in June 1926. The meet was called "the college Olympics of America."

== Team scoring ==
No team championship was recognized at the 1926 event. However, the Los Angeles Times reported that, if team points had been counted, the following universities would have been the points leaders:

1. Southern California - 27 1/2 points
2. Michigan - 25 points
3. Nebraska - 13 points
4. Notre Dame - 10 2/3 points
5. Ohio State - 10 points

== Track events ==
100-yard dash
1. Roland Locke, Nebraska - 9.9 seconds
2. George Hester, Michigan
3. Tom Sharkey, Miami
4. Fred Alderman, Michigan St.
5. George Clarke, Washington
6. Murray Schultz, Cal Tech

120-yard high hurdles
1. George Guthrie, Ohio St. - 14.8 seconds
2. Leighton Dye, USC
3. Charles Werner, Illinois
4. Clifton Reynolds, USC
5. Duren, Tulane
6. Weems Baskin, Alabama Poly

220-yard dash
1. Roland Locke, Nebraska - 20.9 seconds (NCAA record)
2. Tom Sharkey, Miami
3. Fred Alderman, Michigan St.
4. Edgar House, USC
5. Victor Leschinsky, Michigan
6. Engle, Oberlin

220-yard low hurdles
1. Edwin Spence, College of City of Detroit 23.5 (NCAA record)
2. Ken Grumbles, USC
3. Lawrence Irwin, Ohio St.
4. George Guthrie, Ohio St
5. Charles Werner, Illinois
6. Frank Cuhel, Iowa

440-yard dash
1. Herman Phillips, Butler - 48.7 seconds (NCAA record)
2. Harry Oestreich, Gustavus Adolphus
3. Nathan Feinsinger, Michigan
4. Behoch, Illinois
5. Ken Kennedy, Wisconsin
6. Kentz, Georgia Tech

880-yard run
1. Alva Martin, Northwestern - 1:51.7 (world record)
2. Walter Caine, Indiana
3. Garbury, Northwestern
4. John Sittig, Illinois
5. Jim Charteris, Washington
6. Ray Conger, Iowa St.

One-mile run
1. Charley Judge, Notre Dame 4:22.5
2. Arnold Gillette, Montana
3. Willis, Bates
4. Jim Little, Purdue
5. Ray Conger, Iowa St.
6. Doran Rue, Illinois

Two-mile run
1. Arnold Gillette, Montana - 9:40.3
2. Fred "Duke" Peaslee, New Hampshire
3. Vic Chapman, Wisconsin
4. Emery, Miami
5. Leslie Niblick, Oklahoma
6. Red Ramsey, Washington

== Field events ==
Broad jump
1. Harold Chere, Illinois - 23 feet 3 3/4 inches (7.106 m)
2. Phil Northrup, Michigan - 23 feet 1/2 inch (7.023 m)
3. C.B. Smith, Texas
4. Robert Stephens, Nebraska
5. Clifton Reynolds, USC
6. Coulter, Lombard

High jump
1. Rufus Haggard, Texas - 6 feet 7 1/4 inches (2.013 m) (world record)
2. Anton Burg, Chicago
3. Henry Coggeshall, USC
3. Bob King, Stanford
5. David Thomas, Iowa
5. Charles McGinnis, Wisconsin
5. Arthur Meislahn, Illinois

Pole vault
1. Paul Harrington, Notre Dame - 13 feet 3 inches (4.04 m) (NCAA record)
2. J.B. O'Dell, Clemson
3. Glenn Graham, Cal Tech
3. Frank Glaser, Marquette
3. Frank Wirsig, Nebraska
6. William Droegemueller, Northwestern

Discus throw
1. Bud Houser, USC - 148 feet 11 3/4 inches (45.409 m) (NCAA record)
2. Jack Taylor, Baylor
3. Richard Doyle, Michigan
4. Doss Richardson, Missouri
5. Arthur Hoffman, Stanford
6. Welch, Pittsburgh

Javelin
1. Phil Northrup, Michigan - 200 feet 10 inches (61.21 m)
2. L.G. "Ox" Dieterich, Texas A&M
3. John Kuck, Kansas St. Teachers
4. Arthur Cox, Oklahoma
5. Andrew Cook, USC
6. Louis Kreuz, Wisconsin

Shot put
1. John Kuck, Kansas St. Teachers - 50 feet 3/4 inch (15.259 m)
2. Bud Houser, USC
3. Arthur Hoffman, Stanford
4. Doss Richardson, Missouri
5. Herman Brix, Washington
6. Joseph Boland, Notre Dame

Hammer throw
1. Harry Hawkins, Michigan - 148 feet 1/4 inch (45.117 m)
2. Howard Linn, Pittsburgh
3. Spike Nelson, Iowa
4. Earl Williams, Iowa
5. Fred Marquis, Iowa
6. Willis Tressler, Wisconsin

== See also ==
- NCAA Men's Outdoor Track and Field Championship
