= Jim Golliday =

American sprinter (1931–1971)

Personal information
- Born: April 23, 1931 Sacramento, California, U.S.
- Died: April 10, 1971 (aged 39) Downey, Illinois, U.S.
- Height: 1.76 m (5 ft 9 in)
- Weight: 76 kg (168 lb)

Sport
- Sport: Track and field
- Events: 100-yard dash; 100 meters; 200 meters

Achievements and titles
- Personal bests: 100 y: 9.3 s, =WR (Evanston, USA; March 14, 1955)

Jim Golliday was an American sprinter, specializing in the 100 yard and 100 meter events. He was the United States 100 yards champion in 1951.

== Career ==
Originally a champion school football player at Wendell Phillips High School in Chicago, Golliday did not take track and field seriously until his senior year in 1949, winning the Illinois school's 100-yard title.

As a student at Northwestern University, Golliday was USA champion in the 100-yard sprint in 1951. This despite, as a freshman, being unable to compete for his university.

He was considered the favourite for the 100 meters title at the 1952 Helsinki Olympics but injury denied him a chance to compete.

A successful indoor season and a win in the 1952 NCAA 100 yards event showed he was in good early season form (10.4 s into a stiff wind). However, the recurrence of a muscle injury suffered in a semi-final of the 1952 AAU meet meant that he hobbled out of his heat at the 1952 US Olympic Trials. Lindy Remigino, the winner of 100 meters title at the 1952 Olympics, magnanimously stated that "of course, Jimmy Golliday was the favourite in the trials. I think he was the fastest of us all".

In 1952 he entered the United States Army, and competed on service teams in Europe, before returning to the United States and Northwestern University in 1954.

In 1955, he matched the world record for the 100 yards at 9.3 seconds.

In 1956, he set an indoors world record for the 60 yards dash., but injury again denied him a chance to compete at the 1956 Melbourne Olympics. He trailed in last in his semi-final of the 100 meters due to a muscle injury – another occurrence of the type of injury that plagued him throughout his career.

After retirement, he lived in California selling insurance, before returning to Chicago because of ill health.

He died in 1971, aged only 39. The cause of death was listed as pneumonia, a condition he suffered as a complication following surgery for ulcers at Downey Veterans Hospital in Illinois.

== World rankings ==
Golliday was ranked by Track and Field News as among the best in the US and the world in the 100 meters sprint event in the period from 1951 to 1955.

100 meters
Year	World rank	US rank
1951	1st	1st
1952	2nd	2nd
1953	7th	5th
1954	3rd	2nd
1955	1st	1st
