= 400 meters at the NCAA Division I Outdoor Track and Field Championships =

This is a list of NCAA Division I outdoor champions in the 400 meters or its imperial equivalent 440 yard dash. For men, the imperial distance was contested until 1975 excepting Olympic years starting in 1932. Metrication occurred in 1976, so all subsequent championships were at the metric distance. Hand timing was used until 1973, while starting in 1974 fully automatic timing was used. The women's race began in 1982.

== Women's winners ==
Key
A=Altitude assisted
bold = NCAA record/Championship record

Year	Name	Nationality	Team	Time
1982	Marita Payne	Canada	Florida St	52.01
1983	Florence Griffith	United States	UCLA	50.94
1984	Marita Payne	Canada	Florida St	51.05
1985	Sherri Howard	United States	Cal State Los Angeles	50.95
1986	Lillie Leatherwood	United States	Alabama	51.23
1987	Lillie Leatherwood	United States	Alabama	50.90
1988	Rochelle Stevens	United States	Morgan St	51.23
1989	Pauline Davis	Bahamas	Alabama	50.18
1990	Maicel Malone	United States	Arizona St	51.13
1991	Ximena Restrepo	Colombia	Nebraska	51.01
1992	Anita Howard	United States	Florida	51.01
1993	Juliet Campbell	Jamaica	Auburn	50.58
1994	Flirtisha Harris	United States	Seton Hall	51.65
1995	Nicole Green	United States	Kansas St	52.01
1996	Suziann Reid	United States	Texas	52.16
1997	LaTarsha Stroman	United States	Louisiana St	50.60
1998	Suziann Reid	United States	Texas	51.22
1999	Suziann Reid	United States	Texas	51.08
2000	Miki Barber	United States	South Carolina	51.14
2001	Allison Beckford	Jamaica	Rice	52.33
2002	Allison Beckford	Jamaica	Rice	50.83
2003	Sanya Richards	United States	Texas	50.58
2004	Dee Dee Trotter	United States	Tennessee	50.32
2005	Monique Henderson	United States	UCLA	50.10
2006	Clora Williams	Jamaica	Texas A&M	51.11
2007	Natasha Hastings	United States	South Carolina	50.15
2008	Shana Cox	United States	Penn State	50.97
2009	Joanna Atkins	United States	Auburn	50.39
2010	Francena McCorory	United States	Hampton	50.69
2011	Jessica Beard	United States	Texas A&M	51.10
2012	Ashley Spencer	United States	Illinois	50.95
2013	Ashley Spencer	United States	Illinois	50.28
2014	Courtney Okolo	United States	Texas	50.23
2015	Kala Funderburk	United States	Florida State	51.67
2016	Courtney Okolo	United States	Texas	50.36
2017	Chrisann Gordon	Jamaica	Texas	50.51
2018	Lynna Irby	United States	Georgia	49.80
2019	Wadeline Jonathas	United States	South Carolina	50.60
2021	Athing Mu	United States	Texas A&M	49.57
2022	Talitha Diggs	United States	Florida	49.99
2023	Rhasidat Adeleke	Ireland	Texas	49.20
2024	Nickisha Pryce	Jamaica	Arkansas	48.89
2025	Aaliyah Butler	United States	Georgia	49.26
2026	Dejanea Oakley	Jamaica	Georgia	**48.79** CR MR

== Men's winners ==
Key
y=yards
A=Altitude assisted
bold = NCAA record/Championship record

Year	Name, (Country)	Team	Time
1921	Frank Shea	Pittsburgh	49.0y
1922	Commodore Cochrane	Mississippi St	49.7y
1923	Commodore Cochrane	Mississippi St	49.2y
1924	Not held		
1925	Hermon Phillips	Butler	49.4y
1926	Hermon Phillips	Butler	48.7y
1927	Hermon Phillips	Butler	48.5y
1928	Emerson "Bud" Spencer	Stanford	47.7y
1929	Russell Walter	Northwestern	47.9y
1930	Reginald Bowen	Pittsburgh	48.0y
1931	Victor Williams	Southern Cal	48.3y
1932	Alex Wilson Canada	Notre Dame	48.0
1933	Glenn Hardin	Louisiana St	47.1y
1934	Glenn Hardin	Louisiana St	47.0y
1935	James LuValle	UCLA	47.7y
1936	Archie Williams	California	47.0
1937	Loren Benke	Wash St	47.1y
1938	Ray Malott	Stanford	46.8y
1939	Erwin Miller	Southern Cal	47.5y
1940	Lee Orr Canada	Wash St	47.3y
1941	Hubert Kerns	Southern Cal	46.6y
1942	Cliff Bourland	Southern Cal	48.2y
1943	Cliff Bourland	Southern Cal	48.5y
1944	Elmore Harris	Morgan St	47.9y
1945	William Kash	Navy	49.8y
1946	Herb McKenley Jamaica	Illinois	47.5y
1947	Herb McKenley Jamaica	Illinois	46.2yA
1948	Norman Rucks	South Carolina	47.2
1949	Charles Moore	Cornell	47.0y
1950	George Rhoden Jamaica	Morgan St	47.2y
1951	George Rhoden Jamaica	Morgan St	46.5y
1952	George Rhoden Jamaica	Morgan St	46.3
1953	Jim Lea	Southern Cal	47.0y
1954	Jim Lea	Southern Cal	46.7y
1955	Jesse Mashburn	Oklahoma St	46.6y
1956	Jesse Mashburn	Oklahoma St	46.4
1957	Bob McMurray	Morgan St	46.8y
1958	Glenn Davis	Ohio St	45.7y
1959	Eddie Southern	Texas	46.4y
1960	Ted Woods	Colorado	45.7
1961	Adolph Plummer	New Mexico	46.2y
1962	Humberto Brown Panama	Morgan St	46.9y
1963	Ulis Williams	Arizona St	45.8Ay
1964	Bob Tobler	Brigham Y	45.9
1964	Ulis Williams	Arizona St	45.9
1965	Jim Kemp	Kentucky St	46.2y
1966	Dwight Middleton	Southern Cal	46.46y
1967	Emmett Taylor	Ohio	45.9Ay
1968	Lee Evans	San Jose St	45.0
1969	Curtis Mills	Texas A&M	44.93y
1970	Larry James	Villanova	45.5y
1971	John Smith	UCLA	45.3y
1972	John Smith	UCLA	44.5
1973	Maurice Peoples	Arizona St	45.11y
1974	Larance Jones	NE Missouri St	45.46y
1975	Benny Brown	UCLA	45.34Ay
1976	Ken Randle	Southern Cal	45.2
1977	Herman Frazier	Arizona St	45.57
1978	Willie Smith (Note: Billy Mullins of the USC Trojans originally won (also with a time of 45.33 seconds), but he was later declared scholastically ineligible.)	Auburn #	45.33
1979	El Kashief Hassan Sudan	Oregon St	45.18
1980	Bert Cameron Jamaica	UTEP	45.23
1981	Bert Cameron Jamaica	UTEP	44.58
1982	El Kashief Hassan Sudan	Oregon St	45.18A
1983	Bert Cameron Jamaica	UTEP	44.62
1984	Antonio McKay	Georgia Tech	44.83
1985	Roddie Haley	Arkansas	44.7
1986	Gabriel Tiacoh Ivory Coast	Wash St	44.3
1987	Butch Reynolds	Ohio St	44.12
1988	Danny Everett	UCLA	44.52
1989	Raymond Pierre	Baylor	44.59A
1990	Steve Lewis	UCLA	45.19
1991	Gabriel Luke	Rice	45.32
1992	Quincy Watts	Southern Cal	44
1993	Calvin Davis	Arkansas	45.04
1994	Derek Mills	Georgia Tech	45.06
1995	Greg Haughton Jamaica	George Mason	44.62
1996	Davian Clarke Jamaica	Miami FL	45.29
1997	Roxbert Martin Jamaica	Oklahoma	44.77
1998	Jerome Davis	Southern Cal	45.18
1999	Clement Chukwu Nigeria	Eastern Mich	44.79
2000	Avard Moncur Bahamas	Auburn	44.72
2001	Avard Moncur Bahamas	Auburn	44.84
2002	Gary Kikaya Democratic Republic of the Congo	Tennessee	44.53
2003	Adam Steele	Minnesota	44.57
2004	Jeremy Wariner	Baylor	44.71
2005	Darold Williamson	Baylor	44.51
2006	Xavier Carter	Louisiana St	44.53
2007	Ricardo Chambers Jamaica	Florida State	44.66
2008	Andretti Bain Bahamas	Oral Roberts	44.62
2009	Jonathan Borlée Belgium	Florida State	44.78
2010	Kirani James Grenada	Alabama	45.05
2011	Kirani James Grenada	Alabama	45.10
2012	Tony McQuay	Florida	44.58
2013	Bryshon Nellum	USC	44.73
2014	Deon Lendore Trinidad and Tobago	Texas A&M	45.02
2015	Vernon Norwood	LSU	45.10
2016	Arman Hall	Florida	44.82
2017	Fred Kerley	Texas A&M	44.10
2018	Michael Norman	USC Trojans	43.61
2019	Kahmari Montgomery	Houston Cougars	44.23
2020	Canceled due to COVID-19		
2021	Randolph Ross	N. Carolina A&T	43.85
2022	Randolph Ross	N. Carolina A&T	44.13
2023	Emmanuel Bamidele (NGR)	University of Florida	44.24
2024	Christopher Morales Williams (CAN)	Georgia	44.47
2025	Samuel Ogazi (NGR)	Alabama	44.84
2026	Samuel Ogazi (NGR)	Alabama	**43.38** CR MR
