= Curtis Mills =

American athlete

Personal information
- Born: October 6, 1948 Lufkin, Texas, U.S.
- Height: 1.93 m (6 ft 4 in)
- Weight: 79 kg (174 lb)

Sport
- Sport: Athletics
- Event: 400 metres

Curtis Mills (born October 6, 1948) is an American retired athlete who was a world record holder in the men’s 440 yards.

== Early life ==
Mills was raised in Lufkin, Texas and attended Dunbar High School (now Lufkin High School following desegregation). He then attended Texas A&M University.

== Career ==
Mills recorded four world records in the men’s 440 yards and 4 × 220 y/4 × 200 m relay:

- 440 y in 44.7s in Knoxville, Tennessee on 21 June 1969.
- 4 × 220 y relay in 1:22.1 minutes in Austin, Texas on 3 April 1970.
- 4 × 220 y relay in 1:22.1 minutes in Des Moines, Iowa on 24 April 1970.
- 4 × 220 y/4 × 200 m relay in 1:21.7 minutes in Des Moines, Iowa on 24 April 1970.

Note 1: The 1:22.1 timings for the relay were never ratified.

Note 2: His brother, Marvin, also was a member of the relay teams.

Mill was awarded the first scholarship to an African American athlete by Texas A&M University. Whilst studying at the university, he became in 1969 the NCAA 440 y champion.

== Awards and Accolades ==
- In 1979, Mills was inducted into the Texas A&M University Hall of Fame.
- In 2015, Mills was inducted into the Southwest Conference Hall of Fame.
