= T. J. Jackson (wide receiver) =

American football player (1943–2007)

No. 22
- Position: Wide receiver

Personal information
- Born: February 28, 1943; Cordele, Georgia
- Died: March 25, 2007 (aged 64); Rochester, New York
- Listed height: 6 ft 0 in (1.83 m)
- Listed weight: 180 lb (82 kg)

Career information
- College: Illinois
- NFL draft: 1966: undrafted

Career history
- Philadelphia Eagles (1966); Washington Redskins (1967)

Awards and highlights
- All-American; Held Collegiate record 100 m dash (10.1); Frontier Walk of Fame

Career NFL statistics
- Games played: 6
- Kick returns: 8
- Yards: 147
- Stats at Pro Football Reference

Trenton James Jackson (February 28, 1943 – March 25, 2007) was an American professional football wide receiver in the National Football League for the Philadelphia Eagles and the Washington Redskins. He played college football at the University of Illinois.

== Early life ==
Jackson was born in Cordele, Georgia to James and Evelyn Jackson and is the eldest of seven children. The family later moved to Rochester, New York, where he attended Benjamin Franklin High School, where he set the National High School Record in the 100 yard dash (9.4).

== College career ==
Jackson then attended and played college football at University of Illinois, where he was voted an All-American. While there, he was a Big Ten and Rose Bowl champion, and lettered in track, football, basketball, and baseball. In 1964, he won the Big Ten 100 yard Dash in 9.5, the 220 yard dash in 21.3, and anchored the championship 440 yard relay. He also won the NCAA 4×110 yard relay championship, set the National Collegiate Record in the 100 meter dash (10.1), won the AAU 100 meter championship and then participated in the US Olympic Trials 100 meter dash. After, he represented the United States at the 1964 Summer Olympics in Tokyo, Japan and became a member of Omega Psi Phi fraternity. In 1965, he finished third at the NCAA 60 yard dash. Then, he led Illinois to the 4×440 yard relay championship at the outdoor Big Ten championship. Jackson's record for the 100 meters held at Illinois for 40 years.

== Professional sports career ==
In 1966, Jackson was drafted by the St. Louis Cardinals baseball team. However, he chose to play football in the National Football League for the Philadelphia Eagles and then the Washington Redskins.

== Personal ==
Jackson married Pamela Kittelberger and had four children. After retiring from football, Jackson taught in the Rochester City School District for over 30 years. Also a sports coach, Jackson was inducted into the Section V Track and Field, Football, and Basketball Hall of Fames as a player and coach. Jackson died on March 25, 2007.

== Honors ==
Jackson was inducted as an inaugural member of the Frontier Walk of Fame in 1997 and was then an inaugural member of the Niagara Track & Field Hall of Fame in 1998. Trentons high school football field was dedicated to him and is now named “The Trenton Jackson sports complex”. Along with Clinton Baden Recreation center being named after he and his wife, Pamela Jackson.
