= George R. Walker =

American football and basketball coach

Biographical details
- Education: Illinois (1948)

Coaching career (HC unless noted)

Football
- 1955–1960: St. Augustine's

Basketball
- 1955–1957: St. Augustine's

Head coaching record
- Overall: 30–18–2 (football); 20–20 (basketball)

George R. Walker (16 February 1926 – October 2003) was an American football and basketball coach. He was the head football coach at St. Augustine's University in Raleigh, North Carolina from 1955 to 1960. Walker was also the head basketball coach at St. Augustine's from 1955 to 1957.

Walker was also an NCAA champion hurdler for the University of Illinois at Urbana-Champaign. He died in 2003, aged 77.

== Head coaching record ==
=== Football ===
Year	Team	Overall	Conference	Standing	Bowl/playoffs
St. Augustine's Falcons (Central Intercollegiate Athletic Association) (1955–1960)
1955	St. Augustine's	4–5	3–5	10th	
1956	St. Augustine's	6–1–1	5–1–1	T–4th	
1957	St. Augustine's	2–4–1	2–4–1	13th	
1958	St. Augustine's	6–2	6–2	T–5th	
1959	St. Augustine's	7–2	6–2	4th	
1960	St. Augustine's	5–4	4–4	11th	
St. Augustine's:		30–18–2			
Total:		30–18–2			
