= 800 meters at the NCAA Division I Outdoor Track and Field Championships =

This is a list of the NCAA outdoor champions in the 800 meters or its imperial equivalent, the 880 yard run. The imperial distance was run until 1975, while the metric 800 meters was contested in Olympic years starting in 1932. Metrication occurred in 1976, so all subsequent championships were at the metric distance. Hand timing was used until 1973, while starting in 1974 fully automatic timing was used. The women's race began in 1982.

== Women ==
Key
A=Altitude assisted
bold = NCAA record/Championship record

Year	Name	Nationality	Team	Time
1982	Delisa Walton	United States	Tennessee	2:05.22
1983	Joetta Clark	United States	Tennessee	2:02.28
1984	Joetta Clark	United States	Tennessee	2:02.60
1985	Claudette Groenendaal	United States	Oregon	2:01.20
1986	Karen Bakewell	United States	Miami OH	2:00.85
1987	Julie Jenkins	United States	BYU	2:02.52
1988	Sharon Powell	Jamaica	Nebraska	2:03.35
1989	Meredith Rainey	United States	Harvard	2:03.90
1990	Suzy Favor	United States	Wisconsin	1:59.11
1991	Nekita Beasley	United States	Florida	2:03.29
1992	Nekita Beasley	United States	Florida	2:03.04
1993	Kim Sherman	United States	Wisconsin	2:02.99
1994	Inez Turner	Jamaica	SW Texas St	2:01.50
1995	Inez Turner	Jamaica	SW Texas St	2:00.27
1996	Monique Hennagan	United States	North Carolina	2:03.27
1997	Dana Riley	United States	Texas	2:02.89
1998	Hazel Clark	United States	Florida	2:02.16
1999	Claudine Williams	Jamaica	LSU	2:03.38
2000	Tytti Reho	Finland	SMU	2:01.43
2001	Brigita Langerholc	Slovenia	USC	2:01.61
2002	Alice Schmidt	United States	North Carolina	2:04.73
2003	Alice Schmidt	United States	North Carolina	2:01.16
2004	Neisha Bernard-Thomas	Grenada	LSU	2:02.86
2005	Aneita Denton	Jamaica	Arkansas	2:02.84
2006	Rebekah Noble	United States	Oregon	2:02.07
2007	Alysia Johnson	United States	California	1:59.29
2008	Geena Gall	United States	Michigan	2:03.91
2009	Geena Gall	United States	Michigan	2:00.80
2010	Phoebe Wright	United States	Tennessee	2:01.40
2011	Anne Kesselring	United States	Oregon	2:02.15
2012	Nachelle Mackie	United States	BYU	2:01.06
2013	Natoya Goule	Jamaica	LSU	2:00.06
2014	Laura Roesler	United States	Oregon	2:01.22
2015	Raevyn Rogers	United States	Oregon	1:59.71
2016	Raevyn Rogers	United States	Oregon	2:00.75
2017	Raevyn Rogers	United States	Oregon	2:00.02
2018	Sammy Watson	United States	Texas A&M	2:04.21
2019	Jazmine Frey	United States	Texas A&M	2:01.31
2021	Michaela Meyer	United States	Virginia	2:00.28
2022	Kristie Schoffield	United States	Boise State	2:01.09
2023	Michaela Rose	United States	LSU	1:59.83
2024	Juliette Whittaker	United States	Stanford	1:59.61
2025	Roisin Willis	United States	Stanford	1:58.13
2026	Sanu Jallow	Gambia	Arkansas	**1:56.85** CR MR

== Men ==
Key
y=Yards
A=Altitude affected

Year	Name, (Country)	Team	Time
1921	Earl Eby	Pennsylvania	1:57.4y
1922	Alan Helffrich	Penn St	1:58.1y
1923	Alan Helffrich	Penn St	1:56.3y
1924	not held		
1925	James Charteris	Washington	1:55.4y
1926	Alva Martin	Northwestern	1:51.7y*
1927	John Sittig	Illinois	1:54.2y
1928	Virgil Jess Gist	Chicago	1:54.4y
1929	Edwin Genung	Washington	1:55.0y
1930	Orval Martin	Purdue	1:54.1y
1931	Dale Letts	Chicago	1:53.5y
1932	Charles Hornbostel	Indiana	1:52.7
1933	Charles Hornbostel	Indiana	1:50.9y
1934	Charles Hornbostel	Indiana	1:51.9y
1935	Elroy Robinson	Fresno St	1:52.9y
1936	Charlie Beetham	Ohio St	1:53.0
1937	John Woodruff	Pittsburgh	1:50.3y
1938	John Woodruff	Pittsburgh	1:51.3y
1939	John Woodruff	Pittsburgh	1:51.3y
1940	Campbell Kane	Indiana	1:51.5y
1941	Campbell Kane	Indiana	1:51.2y
1942	Bill Lyda	Oklahoma	1:50.8y
1943	Joe Nowicki	Fordham	1:54.2y
1944	Robert Kelley	Illinois	1:55.1y
1945	Ross Hume	Michigan	1:55.7y
1946	Lewis Smith	Virginia Union	1:52.6y
1947	William Clifford	Ohio St	1:50.8yA
1948	Mal Whitfield	Ohio St	1:51.1
1949	Mal Whitfield	Ohio St	1:50.3y
1950	Bill Brown	Morgan St	1:51.2y
1951	John Barnes	Occidental	1:50.7y
1952	John Barnes	Occidental	1:49.6
1953	Lang Stanley	San Jose St	1:52.4y
1954	Arnie Sowell	Pittsburgh	1:50.5y
1955	Tom Courtney	Fordham	1:49.5y
1956	Arnie Sowell	Pittsburgh	1:46.7
1957	Don Bowden	California	1:47.2y
1958	Ron Delany Ireland	Villanova	1:48.6y
1959	George Kerr Jamaica	Illinois	1:47.6y
1960	George Kerr Jamaica	Illinois	1:46.4
1961	John Bork	Western Mich	1:48.3y
1962	Jim Dupree	Southern Illinois	1:48.2y
1963	Norm Hoffman	Oregon St	1:48.0Ay
1964	Tom Farrell	St. John's NY	1:48.5
1965	Tom Farrell	St. John's NY	1:48.1y
1966	Peter Scott	Nebraska	1:47.9y
1967	Wade Bell	Oregon	1:47.6Ay
1968	Byron Dyce Jamaica	New York	1:47.3
1969	Byron Dyce Jamaica	New York	1:45.9y
1970	Ken Swenson	Kansas St	1:46.3y
1971	Mark Winzenried	Wisconsin	1:48.8y
1972	Willie Thomas	Tennessee	1:47.1
1973	Skip Kent	Wisconsin	1:47.2y
1974	Willie Thomas	Tennessee	1:48.72y
1975	Mark Enyeart	Utah St	1:47.01Ay
1976	Tom McLean	Bucknell	1:47.4
1977	Mark Enyeart	Utah St	1:45.2
1978	Peter Lemashon Kenya	UTEP	1:45.7
1979	Don Paige	Villanova	1:46.2
1980	Don Paige	Villanova	1:45.8
1981	Sammy Koskei Kenya	Southern Meth	1:46.4
1982	David Mack	Oregon	1:48.00A
1983	Joaquim Cruz Brazil	Oregon	1:44.9
1984	Joaquim Cruz Brazil	Oregon	1:45.1
1985	Earl Jones	Eastern Mich	1:45.1
1986	Freddie Williams Canada	Abilene Christian	1:46.6
1987	Tracy Baskin	Seton Hall	1:46.6
1988	Paul Ereng Kenya	Virginia	1:46.8
1989	Paul Ereng Kenya	Virginia	1:47.50A
1990	Mark Everett	Florida	1:44.7
1991	George Kersh	Mississippi	1:45.8
1992	Jose "Tony" Parrilla	Tennessee	1:46.5
1993	Jose "Tony" Parrilla	Tennessee	1:46.5
1994	Jose "Tony" Parrilla	Tennessee	1:46.0
1995	Brandon Rock	Arkansas	1:46.4
1996	Einārs Tupurītis Latvia	Wichita St	1:45.1
1997	Bryan Woodward	Georgetown	1:46.5
1998	Khadevis Robinson	Texas Christian	1:46.0
1999	Derrick Peterson	Missouri	1:47.0
2000	Jean-Patrick Nduwimana Burundi	Arizona	1:45.1
2001	Otukile Lekote Botswana	South Carolina	1:46.7
2002	Otukile Lekote Botswana	South Carolina	1:45.2
2003	Sam Burley	Pennsylvania	1:46.5
2004	Jonathan Johnson	Texas Tech	1:46.4
2005	Dmitrijs Miļkevičs Latvia	Nebraska	1:44.7
2006	Ryan Brown	Washington	1:46.3
2007	Andrew Ellerton Canada	Michigan	1:47.48
2008	Jacob Hernandez	Texas	1:45.31
2009	Andrew Wheating	Oregon	1:46.21
2010	Andrew Wheating	Oregon	1:45.69
2011	Robby Andrews	Virginia	1:44.71
2012	Charles Jock	UC Irvine	1:45.59
2013	Elijah Greer	Oregon	1:46.58
2014	Brandon McBride Canada	Mississippi State	1:46.26
2015	Edward Kemboi Kenya	Iowa State	1:49.26
2016	Donavan Brazier	Texas A&M	1:43.55
2017	Emmanuel Korir	UTEP	1:45.03
2018	Isaiah Harris	Penn State	1:44.76
2019	Bryce Hoppel	Kansas	1:45.26
2020	not held		
2021	Isaiah Jewett	USC	1:44.68
2022	Moad Zahafi	Texas Tech	1:44.49
2023	Will Sumner	University of Georgia	1:44.26
2024	Shane Cohen	Virginia	1:44.97
2025	Sam Whitmarsh	Texas A&M	1:45.86
2026	Colin Sahlman	Northern Arizona	1:44.22
