= Weight throw at the NCAA Division I Indoor Track and Field Championships =

The weight throw has been held at the NCAA Division I Indoor Track and Field Championships annually since 1966. The women's competition began in 1996, 13 years after the start of the NCAA Division I Women's Indoor Track and Field Championships.

In 2001 and 2002, the throwing implement was found to have not met specifications, so the throws were not eligible for collegiate or NCAA meet records.

== Winners ==
Key
A=Altitude assisted

Women's weight throw winners
Year	Athlete	Team	Mark
1996	Dawn Ellerbe	South Carolina Gamecocks	20.68m 67-10¼
1997	Dawn Ellerbe	South Carolina Gamecocks	21.86m 71-8¾
1998	Lisa Misipeka	South Carolina Gamecocks	21.47m 70-5¼
1999	Toyinda Smith	Purdue Boilermakers	20.95m 68-8¾
2000	Florence Ezeh	SMU Mustangs	21.32m 69-11½
2001	Florence Ezeh	SMU Mustangs	21.29m 69-10¼
2002	Candice Scott	Florida Gators	23.05m 75-7½
2003	Erin Gilreath	Florida Gators	22.04m 72-3¾
2004	Candice Scott	Florida Gators	23.05m 75-7½
2005	Candice Scott	Florida Gators	24.17m 79-3¾
2006	Jenny Dahlgren	Georgia Bulldogs	24.04m 78-10½
2007	Brittany Riley	Southern Illinois Salukis	25.56m 83-10¼
2008	Brittany Riley	Southern Illinois Salukis	25.34m 83-1¾
2009	D'Ana McCarty	Louisville Cardinals	22.09m 72-5¾
2010	D'Ana McCarty	Louisville Cardinals	22.76m
2011	Felisha Johnson	Indiana State Sycamores	22.69m
2012	Jeneva Mccall	Southern Illinois Salukis	22.90m
2013	Felisha Johnson	Indiana State Sycamores	23.52m
2014	Brea Garrett	Texas A&M Aggies	22.15m A
2015	Kearsten Peoples	Missouri Tigers	22.71m
2016	Vesta Bell	UC Riverside Highlanders	22.42m
2017	Annette Echikunwoke	Cincinnati Bearcats	22.42m
2018	Kaitlyn Long	Minnesota Golden Gophers	23.30m
2019	Sade Olatoye	Ohio State Buckeyes	24.46m
2021	Makenli Forrest	Louisville Cardinals	23.26m
2022	Shey Taiwo	Ole Miss Rebels	25.55m
2023	Jalani Davis	Ole Miss Rebels	24.51m A
2024	Jalani Davis	Ole Miss Rebels	24.80m
2025	Taylor Kesner	Wisconsin Badgers	23.50m
2026	Anthonett Nabwe	Minnesota Golden Gophers	25.13m

Men's weight throw winners
Year	Athlete	Team	Mark
1966	Bob Mead	Manhattan Jaspers	18.00m 59-½
1967	Andy Yuen	UConn Huskies	18.84m 61-9¾
1968	Bob Narcessian	Rhode Island Rams	19.96m 65-5¾
1969	Charles Ajootian	Harvard Crimson	18.81m 61-8½
1970	Ed Wosal	Harvard Crimson	19.36m 63-6¼
1971	Al Schoterman	Kent State Golden Flashes	20.99m 68-10¼
1972	Jacques Accambray	Kent State Golden Flashes	21.91m 71-10¾
1973	Ted Bregar	Navy Midshipmen	20.76m 68-1½
1974	Jacques Accambray	Kent State Golden Flashes	21.91m 71-10¾
1975	Pete Farmer	UTEP Miners	21.07m 69-1½
1976	Emmitt Berry	UTEP Miners	20.02m 65–8
1977	Scott Neilson	Washington Huskies	20.99m 68-10½
1978	Scott Neilson	Washington Huskies	20.92m 68-7¾
1979	Scott Neilson	Washington Huskies	21.78m 71-5½
1980	David Pellagrini	Princeton Tigers	21.11m 69-3¼
1981	Robert Weir	SMU Mustangs	22.43m 73-7¼
1982	Tore Johnsen	UTEP Miners	21.42m 70-3½
1983	Robert Weir	SMU Mustangs	23.30m 76-5½
1984	Tore Johnsen	UTEP Miners	22.02m 72–3
1985	Tore Johnsen	UTEP Miners	21.50m 70-6½
1986	Tore Gustafsson	Washington State Cougars	22.64m 74-3½
1987	Fred Schumacher	San Jose State Spartans	20.37m 66–10
1988	Gary Halpin	Manhattan Jaspers	20.80m 68–3
1989	Christoph Koch	Louisiana–Monroe Warhawks	21.17m 69-5½
1990	Per Karlsson	BYU Cougars	20.67m 67-9¾
1991	Christophe Epalle	SMU Mustangs	22.73m 74–7
1992	Mika Laaksonen	UTEP Miners	20.71m 67-11½
1993	Marko Wahlman	UTEP Miners	21.84m 71–8
1994	Ron Willis	South Carolina Gamecocks	21.92m 71–11
1995	Alex Papadimitriou	UTEP Miners	21.77m 71-5¼
1996	Ryan Butler	Wyoming Cowboys	21.68m 71-1½
1997	Sean McGehearty	Boston College Eagles	22.02m 72–3
1998	Libor Charfreitag	SMU Mustangs	21.23m 69–8
1999	Libor Charfreitag	SMU Mustangs	22.03m 72-3½
2000	Libor Charfreitag	SMU Mustangs	23.87m 78-3¾
2001	Andras Haklits	Georgia Bulldogs	24.43m 80–2
2002	Scott Russell	Kansas Jayhawks	24.67m 80-11¼
2003	Thomas Freeman	Manhattan Jaspers	21.70m 71-2½
2004	Dan Taylor	Ohio State Buckeyes	23.66m 77-7½
2005	Spyridon Jullien	Virginia Tech Hokies	23.18m 76-¾
2006	Spyridon Jullien	Virginia Tech Hokies	23.73m 77-10¼
2007	Egor Agafonov	Kansas Jayhawks	23.60m 77-5¼
2008	Egor Agafonov	Kansas Jayhawks	22.71m 74-6¼
2009	Jason Lewis	Arizona State Sun Devils	22.88m 75-¾
2010	Walter Henning	LSU Tigers	23.56m
2011	Walter Henning	LSU Tigers	22.16m
2012	Marcel Lomnický	Virginia Tech Hokies	22.04m
2013	Alexander Ziegler	Virginia Tech Hokies	22.46m
2014	Michael Lihrman	Wisconsin Badgers	23.25m A
2015	Michael Lihrman	Wisconsin Badgers	24.64m
2016	Alex Young	Southeastern Louisiana Lions	23.80m
2017	Johnnie Jackson	LSU Tigers	22.88m
2018	David Lucas	Penn State Nittany Lions	24.02m
2019	Payton Otterdahl	North Dakota State Bison	24.11m
2021	Thomas Mardal	Florida Gators	24.46m
2022	Bobby Colantonio	Alabama Crimson Tide	23.60m
2023	Isaiah Rogers	Kennesaw State Owls	24.23m A
2024	Kenneth Ikeji	Harvard Crimson	24.32m
2025	Daniel Reynolds	Wyoming Cowboys	25.08m
2026	Ryan Johnson	Iowa Hawkeyes	25.64m
