= Hammer throw at the NCAA Division I Outdoor Track and Field Championships =

This is a list of NCAA Division I outdoor champions in the hammer throw. Measurement was conducted in imperial distances (feet and inches) until 1975. Metrication occurred in 1976, so all subsequent championships were measured in metric distances. The women's event began in 1996.

== Winners ==
Key
* =Altitude assisted

Women's hammer throw winners
Year	Athlete	Team	Distance
1996	Dawn Ellerbe	South Carolina Gamecocks	63.76 m (209 ft 2 in)
1997	Dawn Ellerbe	South Carolina Gamecocks	63.20 m (207 ft 4 in)
1998	Lisa Misipeka (ASA)	South Carolina Gamecocks	63.82 m (209 ft 4 in)
1999	Florence Ezeh (FRA)	SMU Mustangs	63.14 m (207 ft 1 in)
2000	Florence Ezeh (FRA)	SMU Mustangs	64.58 m (211 ft 10 in)
2001	Florence Ezeh (FRA)	SMU Mustangs	66.85 m (219 ft 3 in)
2002	Jamine Moton	Clemson Tigers	67.21 m (220 ft 6 in)
2003	Candice Scott (TRI)	Florida Gators	69.79 m (228 ft 11 in)
2004	Candice Scott (TRI)	Florida Gators	68.83 m (225 ft 9 in)
2005	Loree Smith	Colorado State Rams	68.47 m (224 ft 7 in)
2006	Jennifer Dahlgren (ARG)	Georgia Bulldogs	69.00 m (226 ft 4 in)
2007	Jennifer Dahlgren (ARG)	Georgia Bulldogs	70.72 m (232 ft 0 in)
2008	Eva Orban (HUN)	USC Trojans	68.71 m (225 ft 5 in)
2009	Stevi Large	Akron Zips	68.08 m (223 ft 4 in)
2010	Nikola Lomnicka (SLO)	Georgia Bulldogs	65.57 m (215 ft 1 in)
2011	Dorotea Habazin	Virginia Tech Hokies	68.15 m (223 ft 7 in)
2012	Jeneva McCall	Southern Illinois Salukis	68.67 m (225 ft 4 in)
2013	Chelsea Cassulo	Arizona State Sun Devils	69.12 m (226 ft 9 in)
2014	Julia Ratcliffe (NZL)	Princeton Tigers	66.88 m (219 ft 5 in)
2015	DeAnna Price	Southern Illinois Salukis	71.48 m (234 ft 6 in)
2016	DeAnna Price	Southern Illinois Salukis	71.53 m (234 ft 8 in)
2017	Maggie Ewen	Arizona State Sun Devils	73.32 m (240 ft 7 in)
2018	Janeah Stewart	Ole Miss Rebels	72.92 m (239 ft 3 in)
2019	Camryn Rogers (CAN)	California Golden Bears	71.50 m (234 ft 7 in)
2020	Not held due to COVID-19		
2021	Camryn Rogers (CAN)	California Golden Bears	75.52 m (247 ft 9 in)
2022	Camryn Rogers (CAN)	California Golden Bears	77.67 m (254 ft 9 in)
2023	Stephanie Ratcliffe (AUS)	Harvard Crimson	73.63 m (241 ft 6 in)
2024	Elísabet Rut Rúnarsdóttir (ISL)}	Texas State Bobcats	70.47 m (231 ft 2 in)
2025	Stephanie Ratcliffe (AUS)}	Georgia Bulldogs	71.37 m (234 ft 1 in)
2026	Elísabet Rut Rúnarsdóttir (ISL)}	Texas State Bobcats	73.19 m (240 ft 1 in)

Men's hammer throw winners
Year	Athlete	Team	Distance
1921	Charles Redmon	Chicago Maroons	40.79 m (133 ft 9 in)
1922	Jack Merchant	California Golden Bears	49.17 m (161 ft 3 in)
1923	Fred Tootell	Bowdoin Polar Bears	53.37 m (175 ft 1 in)
1924	not held		
1925	Ray Bunker	Ohio State Buckeyes	45.73 m (150 ft 0 in)
1926	Harry Hawkins	Michigan Wolverines	45.12 m (148 ft 0 in)
1927	Donald Gwinn	Pittsburgh Panthers	47.47 m (155 ft 8 in)
1928	Wilford Ketz	Michigan Wolverines	49.9 m (163 ft 8 in)
1929	Donald Gwinn	Pittsburgh Panthers	49.93 m (163 ft 9 in)
1930	Holley Campbell	Michigan Wolverines	49.59 m (162 ft 8 in)
1931	Ivan Dykeman	Colorado State Rams	49.41 m (162 ft 1 in)
1932	Grant McDougall	Penn Quakers	48.71 m (159 ft 9 in)
1933	Roderick H. Cox	Michigan Wolverines	47.57 m (156 ft 0 in)
1934	Henry Dreyer	Rhode Island Rams	51.72 m (169 ft 8 in)
1935	Anton Kishon	Bates Bobcats	51.43 m (168 ft 8 in)
1936	not held		
1937	not held		
1938	not held		
1939	not held		
1940	not held		
1941	not held		
1942	not held		
1943	not held		
1944	not held		
1945	not held		
1946	not held		
1947	not held		
1948	Samuel Felton	Harvard Crimson	52.05 m (170 ft 9 in)
1949	not held		
1950	not held		
1951	not held		
1952	Gil Borjeson	Brown Bears	53.76 m (176 ft 4 in)
1953	not held		
1954	not held		
1955	not held		
1956	Bill McWilliams	Bowdoin Polar Bears	59.51 m (195 ft 2 in)
1957	not held		
1958	not held		
1959	John Lawlor (IRL)	Boston University Terriers	63.22 m (207 ft 4 in)
1960	John Lawlor (IRL)	Boston University Terriers	63.75 m (209 ft 1 in)
1961	Tom Pagani	Cal Poly Mustangs	59.4 m (194 ft 10 in)
1962	Edward Bailey	Harvard Crimson	59.11 m (193 ft 11 in)
1963	George Desnoyers	Boston College Eagles	57.96 m (190 ft 1 in)*
1964	Alex Schulten	Bowdoin Polar Bears	58.37 m (191 ft 6 in)
1965	John Fiore	Boston College Eagles	61.21 m (200 ft 9 in)
1966	John Fiore	Boston College Eagles	61.35 m (201 ft 3 in)
1967	Bob Narcessian	Rhode Island Rams	60.06 m (197 ft 0 in)*
1968	Bob Narcessian	Rhode Island Rams	61.59 m (202 ft 0 in)
1969	Steve DeAutremont	Oregon State Beavers	58.04 m (190 ft 5 in)
1970	Steve DeAutremont	Oregon State Beavers	62.1 m (203 ft 8 in)
1971	Jacques Accambray (FRA)	Kent State Golden Flashes	69.44 m (227 ft 9 in)
1972	Al Schoterman	Kent State Golden Flashes	70.48 m (231 ft 2 in)
1973	Jacques Accambray (FRA)	Kent State Golden Flashes	67.51 m (221 ft 5 in)
1974	Peter Farmer (AUS)	UTEP Miners	70.26 m (230 ft 6 in)
1975	Boris Djerassi	Northeastern Huskies	68.78 m (225 ft 7 in)*
1976	Scott Neilson (CAN)	Washington Huskies	66.04 m (216 ft 8 in)
1977	Scott Neilson (CAN)	Washington Huskies	69.6 m (228 ft 4 in)
1978	Scott Neilson (CAN)	Washington Huskies	72.36 m (237 ft 4 in)
1979	Scott Neilson (CAN)	Washington Huskies	72.32 m (237 ft 3 in)
1980	Thommie Sjöholm (SWE)	UTEP Miners	68.58 m (225 ft 0 in)
1981	Richard Olsen (NOR)	SMU Mustangs	72.24 m (237 ft 0 in)
1982	Richard Olsen (NOR)	SMU Mustangs	73.30 m (240 ft 5 in)*
1983	Robert Weir (GBR)	SMU Mustangs	74.42 m (244 ft 1 in)
1984	Matt Mileham (GBR)	Fresno State Bulldogs	73.74 m (241 ft 11 in)
1985	Tore Gustafsson (SWE)	Washington State Cougars	75.24 m (246 ft 10 in)
1986	Ken Flax	Oregon Ducks	78.34 m (257 ft 0 in)
1987	Stefan Jönsson (SWE)	Washington State Cougars	68.48 m (224 ft 8 in)
1988	Stefan Jönsson (SWE)	Washington State Cougars	71.08 m (233 ft 2 in)
1989	Christoph Koch (FRG)	Louisiana–Monroe Warhawks	71.08 m (233 ft 2 in)*
1990	Scott McGee	Oregon Ducks	66.36 m (217 ft 8 in)
1991	Christophe Épalle (FRA)	SMU Mustangs	72.7 m (238 ft 6 in)
1992	Mika Laaksonen (FIN)	UTEP Miners	71.3 m (233 ft 11 in)
1993	Balázs Kiss (HUN)	USC Trojans	75.24 m (246 ft 10 in)
1994	Balázs Kiss (HUN)	USC Trojans	74.84 m (245 ft 6 in)
1995	Balázs Kiss (HUN)	USC Trojans	79.62 m (261 ft 2 in)
1996	Balázs Kiss (HUN)	USC Trojans	80.86 m (265 ft 3 in)
1997	Bengt Johansson (SWE)	USC Trojans	70.12 m (230 ft 0 in)
1998	Libor Charfreitag (SVK)	SMU Mustangs	72.3 m (237 ft 2 in)
1999	Andras Haklits (CRO)	Louisiana–Monroe Warhawks	74.09 m (243 ft 0 in)
2000	Libor Charfreitag (SVK)	SMU Mustangs	77.22 m (253 ft 4 in)
2001	Andras Haklits (CRO)	Georgia Bulldogs	75.5 m (247 ft 8 in)
2002	Andras Haklits (CRO)	Georgia Bulldogs	77.32 m (253 ft 8 in)
2003	Lucais MacKay	Georgia Bulldogs	70.19 m (230 ft 3 in)
2004	Thomas Freeman	Manhattan Jaspers	70.77 m (232 ft 2 in)
2005	Spyridon Jullien (GRE)	Virginia Tech Hokies	70.43 m (231 ft 0 in)
2006	Spyridon Jullien (GRE)	Virginia Tech Hokies	72.29 m (237 ft 2 in)
2007	Jake Dunkleberger	Auburn Tigers	71.87 m (235 ft 9 in)
2008	Cory Martin	Auburn Tigers	74.12 m (243 ft 2 in)
2009	Marcel Lomnický (SVK)	Virginia Tech Hokies	71.78 m (235 ft 5 in)
2010	Walter Henning	LSU Tigers	72.79 m (238 ft 9 1/2 in)
2011	Alexander Ziegler (GER)	Virginia Tech Hokies	72.69 m (238 ft 5 in)
2012	Alexander Ziegler (GER)	Virginia Tech Hokies	75.78 m (248 ft 7 in)
2013	Tomáš Kružliak (SVK)	Virginia Tech Hokies	69.26 m (227 ft 2 in)
2014	Matthias Tayala	Kent State Golden Flashes	73.57 m (241 ft 4 in)
2015	Conor McCullough	USC Trojans	76.91 m (252 ft 3 in)
2016	Nick Miller (GBR)	Oklahoma State Cowboys	73.98 m (242 ft 8 in)
2017	Rudy Winkler	Cornell Big Red	74.12 m (243 ft 2 in)
2018	Denzel Comenentia (NED)	Georgia Bulldogs	76.41 m (250 ft 8 in)
2019	Daniel Haugh	Kennesaw State Owls	74.63 m (244 ft 10 in)
2021	Thomas Mardal (NOR)	Florida Gators	76.74 m (251 ft 9 in)
2022	Logan Blomquist	Southeast Missouri State Redhawks	73.37 m (240 ft 8 in)
2023	Kenneth Ikeji (GBR)	Harvard Crimson	77.92 m (255 ft 7 in)
2024	Rowan Hamilton (CAN)	California Golden Bears	77.18 m (253 ft 2 in)
2025	Konstantinos Zaltos (GRE)	Minnesota Golden Gophers	78.08 m (256 ft 2 in)
2026	Angelos Mantzouranis (GRE)	Minnesota Golden Gophers	75.78 m (248 ft 7 in)
