= Pittsburgh Panthers track and field =

College track and field team

- University: University of Pittsburgh
- Head coach: Alonzo Webb
- Conference: ACC
- Location: Pittsburgh, Pennsylvania
- Outdoor track: Fitzgerald Field House
- Nickname: Panthers
- Colors: Blue and gold

The Pittsburgh Panthers track and field team is the track and field program that represents University of Pittsburgh. The Panthers compete in NCAA Division I as a member of the Atlantic Coast Conference. The team is based in Pittsburgh, Pennsylvania at the Fitzgerald Field House.

The program is coached by Alonzo Webb. The track and field program officially encompasses four teams because the NCAA considers men's and women's indoor track and field and outdoor track and field as separate sports.

Ever since Pitt Stadium was destroyed in 1999, the Pitt track and field team has not had an outdoor track facility to train on, unusual amongst NCAA Division I track teams. Nonetheless, students train indoors at the Fitzgerald Field House and there are plans to build an additional 300 m indoor track facility.

Pitt's track and field team has been said to have the most lasting success and impact among all of the Pittsburgh Panthers sports teams. John Woodruff went on to win the gold medal at the 1936 Olympic 800 m.

== Postseason ==
=== AIAW ===
The Panthers have had 2 AIAW All-Americans finishing in the top six at the AIAW indoor or outdoor championships.

AIAW All-Americans
Championships	Name	Event	Place
1976 Outdoor	Marie Ribik	High jump	4th
1981 Outdoor	Gwen Murray	400 meters	5th

=== NCAA ===
As of 2024, a total of 46 men and 16 women have achieved individual first-team All-American status at the Division I men's outdoor, women's outdoor, men's indoor, or women's indoor national championships.

First team NCAA All-Americans
Team	Championships	Name	Event	Place	Ref.
Men's	1921 Outdoor	Frank Shea	400 meters	1st	
Men's	1926 Outdoor	Gilbert Welch	Discus throw	6th	
Men's	1926 Outdoor	Howard Linn	Hammer throw	2nd	
Men's	1927 Outdoor	Kenneth Wibecan	100 meters	5th	
Men's	1927 Outdoor	Gilbert Welch	Discus throw	2nd	
Men's	1927 Outdoor	Donald Gwinn	Hammer throw	1st	
Men's	1927 Outdoor	Howard Linn	Hammer throw	3rd	
Men's	1928 Outdoor	Vic Pickard	Pole vault	3rd	
Men's	1928 Outdoor	Gilbert Welch	Discus throw	5th	
Men's	1928 Outdoor	Donald Gwinn	Hammer throw	2nd	
Men's	1929 Outdoor	Pete Bowen	400 meters	3rd	
Men's	1929 Outdoor	Vic Pickard	Pole vault	3rd	
Men's	1929 Outdoor	Donald Gwinn	Hammer throw	1st	
Men's	1930 Outdoor	Pete Bowen	400 meters	1st	
Men's	1935 Outdoor	Fred Kiger	400 meters	4th	
Men's	1935 Outdoor	Charles Gongloff	Hammer throw	5th	
Men's	1935 Outdoor	Charles Gongloff	Javelin throw	1st	
Men's	1937 Outdoor	John Woodruff	800 meters	1st	
Men's	1938 Outdoor	John Woodruff	800 meters	1st	
Men's	1939 Outdoor	Frank Ohl	200 meters	5th	
Men's	1939 Outdoor	John Woodruff	800 meters	1st	
Men's	1939 Outdoor	Frank Ohl	Long jump	7th	
Men's	1940 Outdoor	Harold Stickel	220 yards hurdles	5th	
Men's	1940 Outdoor	John Bazyk	Shot put	5th	
Men's	1941 Outdoor	Harold Stickel	220 yards hurdles	7th	
Men's	1942 Outdoor	Harold Stickel	220 yards hurdles	>6th	
Men's	1942 Outdoor	Harold Stickel	100 meters	4th	
Men's	1946 Outdoor	Herb Douglas	Long jump	2nd	
Men's	1950 Outdoor	John Wilson	800 meters	5th	
Men's	1954 Outdoor	Arnie Sowell	800 meters	1st	
Men's	1956 Outdoor	Paul Thrash	400 meters hurdles	5th	
Men's	1956 Outdoor	Arnie Sowell	800 meters	1st	
Men's	1958 Outdoor	Wesley King	Discus throw	7th	
Men's	1959 Outdoor	Mel Barnwell	400 meters	8th	
Men's	1959 Outdoor	Daniel Kanell	Discus throw	7th	
Men's	1961 Outdoor	Dick Clark	Hammer throw	7th	
Men's	1963 Outdoor	Bill del Vecchio	100 meters	4th	
Men's	1963 Outdoor	Bill del Vecchio	200 meters	7th	
Men's	1965 Outdoor	Bill del Vecchio	200 meters	6th	
Men's	1968 Outdoor	Jerry Richey	1500 meters	5th	
Men's	1970 Indoor	Smitty Brown	600 yards	5th	
Men's	1970 Indoor	Jerry Richey	3000 meters	1st	
Men's	1970 Outdoor	Jerry Richey	Mile run	7th	
Men's	1970 Outdoor	Bryant Salter	Triple jump	3rd	
Men's	1970 Outdoor	Bob Kouvolo	Javelin throw	5th	
Men's	1971 Indoor	Jerry Richey	3000 meters	3rd	
Men's	1971 Indoor	Ken Silay	Distance medley relay	1st	
Men's	1971 Indoor	Dorel Watley	Distance medley relay	1st	
Men's	1971 Indoor	Mike Schurko	Distance medley relay	1st	
Men's	1971 Indoor	Jerry Richey	Distance medley relay	1st	
Men's	1971 Outdoor	Mike Schurko	3000 meters steeplechase	7th	
Men's	1971 Outdoor	Bill Rea	Long jump	5th	
Men's	1971 Outdoor	Bob Kouvolo	Javelin throw	5th	
Men's	1972 Indoor	Bill Rea	Long jump	5th	
Men's	1972 Outdoor	Bill Rea	Long jump	3rd	
Men's	1973 Indoor	Ken Silay	4 × 800 meters relay	4th	
Men's	1973 Indoor	Rich Markley	4 × 800 meters relay	4th	
Men's	1973 Indoor	Bob Steele	4 × 800 meters relay	4th	
Men's	1973 Indoor	Rich Jackson	4 × 800 meters relay	4th	
Men's	1973 Indoor	Bill Rea	Long jump	3rd	
Men's	1973 Outdoor	Bill Rea	Long jump	5th	
Men's	1974 Indoor	Bill Rea	Long jump	2nd	
Men's	1974 Outdoor	Bill Rea	Long jump	5th	
Men's	1976 Indoor	Karl Farmer	600 yards	2nd	
Men's	1982 Indoor	Darren Geary	800 meters	6th	
Men's	1983 Indoor	Darren Geary	4 × 800 meters relay	5th	
Men's	1983 Indoor	William Moorhead	4 × 800 meters relay	5th	
Men's	1983 Indoor	Garland Brown	4 × 800 meters relay	5th	
Men's	1983 Indoor	Terry Gallagher	4 × 800 meters relay	5th	
Men's	1983 Outdoor	Roger Kingdom	110 meters hurdles	1st	
Men's	1984 Indoor	Roger Kingdom	55 meters hurdles	1st	
Men's	1984 Indoor	Todd Colas	1000 meters	6th	
Men's	1985 Indoor	Lee McRae	55 meters	6th	
Men's	1986 Indoor	Lee McRae	55 meters	1st	
Men's	1986 Indoor	Eric Cannon	55 meters hurdles	4th	
Men's	1986 Indoor	Rob Weiner	4 × 800 meters relay	4th	
Men's	1986 Indoor	Joe Daniels	4 × 800 meters relay	4th	
Men's	1986 Indoor	Dave Moore	4 × 800 meters relay	4th	
Men's	1986 Indoor	Tim Manes	4 × 800 meters relay	4th	
Men's	1986 Outdoor	Lee McRae	100 meters	1st	
Men's	1987 Indoor	Lee McRae	55 meters	1st	
Men's	1987 Indoor	Rob Weiner	4 × 800 meters relay	4th	
Men's	1987 Indoor	Joe Daniels	4 × 800 meters relay	4th	
Men's	1987 Indoor	Tim Manes	4 × 800 meters relay	4th	
Men's	1987 Indoor	Dave Moore	4 × 800 meters relay	4th	
Men's	1987 Outdoor	Lee McRae	100 meters	2nd	
Men's	1987 Outdoor	Lee McRae	200 meters	6th	
Men's	1988 Indoor	Lee McRae	55 meters	1st	
Men's	1988 Indoor	Eric Cannon	55 meters hurdles	4th	
Men's	1989 Indoor	David Price	4 × 800 meters relay	7th	
Men's	1989 Indoor	TJ Brookover	4 × 800 meters relay	7th	
Men's	1989 Indoor	Tom Boggan	4 × 800 meters relay	7th	
Men's	1989 Indoor	Dave Moore	4 × 800 meters relay	7th	
Men's	1989 Outdoor	Eric Cannon	110 meters hurdles	2nd	
Men's	1989 Outdoor	Elbert Ellis	110 meters hurdles	8th	
Men's	1990 Indoor	Elbert Ellis	55 meters hurdles	6th	
Men's	1990 Outdoor	Elbert Ellis	110 meters hurdles	4th	
Men's	1990 Outdoor	David Moore	800 meters	7th	
Men's	1990 Outdoor	Keith Dowling	10,000 meters	8th	
Women's	1990 Outdoor	Keisha Demas	400 meters	8th	
Women's	1990 Outdoor	Clarissa Dudley	4 × 400 meters relay	5th	
Women's	1990 Outdoor	Ronise Crumpler	4 × 400 meters relay	5th	
Women's	1990 Outdoor	Monica Hockaday	4 × 400 meters relay	5th	
Women's	1990 Outdoor	Keisha Demas	4 × 400 meters relay	5th	
Men's	1991 Indoor	Elbert Ellis	55 meters hurdles	2nd	
Men's	1991 Indoor	Keith Dowling	5000 meters	6th	
Men's	1991 Outdoor	Elbert Ellis	110 meters hurdles	4th	
Men's	1991 Outdoor	Elbert Ellis	400 meters hurdles	8th	
Women's	1991 Outdoor	Keisha Deimas	400 meters	6th	
Women's	1991 Outdoor	Clarissa Dudley	4 × 400 meters relay	5th	
Women's	1991 Outdoor	Ronise Crumpler	4 × 400 meters relay	5th	
Women's	1991 Outdoor	Kimberly Blair	4 × 400 meters relay	5th	
Women's	1991 Outdoor	Keisha Demas	4 × 400 meters relay	5th	
Women's	1992 Outdoor	Carmella Mariani	10,000 meters	6th	
Women's	1993 Indoor	Allison Williams	55 meters hurdles	6th	
Women's	1993 Outdoor	Allison Williams	100 meters hurdles	8th	
Women's	1993 Outdoor	Ronise Crumpler	800 meters	8th	
Women's	1994 Indoor	Najuma Fletcher	High jump	7th	
Women's	1994 Indoor	Najuma Fletcher	Triple jump	5th	
Women's	1994 Outdoor	Allison Williams	100 meters hurdles	6th	
Women's	1994 Outdoor	Kim Blair	400 meters hurdles	3rd	
Women's	1994 Outdoor	Najuma Fletcher	High jump	6th	
Women's	1994 Outdoor	Najuma Fletcher	Triple jump	6th	
Women's	1994 Outdoor	Najuma Fletcher	Heptathlon	3rd	
Women's	1995 Indoor	Angie Martin	800 meters	6th	
Women's	1995 Indoor	Najuma Fletcher	High jump	4th	
Women's	1995 Indoor	Nejuma Fletcher	Long jump	5th	
Women's	1995 Indoor	Najuma Fletcher	Triple jump	1st	
Women's	1995 Outdoor	Najuma Fletcher	High jump	2nd	
Women's	1995 Outdoor	Najuma Fletcher	Long jump	7th	
Women's	1995 Outdoor	Najuma Fletcher	Triple jump	3rd	
Women's	1996 Indoor	Najuma Fletcher	High jump	1st	
Women's	1996 Indoor	Trecia Smith	Long jump	7th	
Women's	1996 Indoor	Najuma Fletcher	Long jump	8th	
Women's	1996 Indoor	Najuma Fletcher	Triple jump	4th	
Women's	1996 Outdoor	Trecia Smith	Long jump	6th	
Women's	1996 Outdoor	Trecia Smith	Triple jump	2nd	
Women's	1997 Indoor	Angie Martin	800 meters	4th	
Women's	1997 Indoor	Trecia Smith	Long jump	1st	
Women's	1997 Indoor	Trecia Smith	Triple jump	2nd	
Women's	1997 Outdoor	Trecia Smith	Long jump	1st	
Women's	1997 Outdoor	Trecia Smith	Triple jump	5th	
Women's	1998 Indoor	Chantee Earl	800 meters	3rd	
Women's	1998 Indoor	Trecia Smith	Long jump	1st	
Women's	1998 Indoor	Trecia Smith	Triple jump	1st	
Women's	1998 Outdoor	Chantee Earl	800 meters	4th	
Women's	1998 Outdoor	Trecia Smith	Long jump	2nd	
Women's	1998 Outdoor	Trecia Smith	Triple jump	1st	
Women's	1999 Indoor	Chantee Earl	800 meters	4th	
Women's	1999 Indoor	Trecia Smith	Long jump	1st	
Women's	1999 Indoor	Trecia Smith	Triple jump	2nd	
Women's	1999 Outdoor	Chantee Earl	800 meters	7th	
Women's	1999 Outdoor	Trecia Smith	Long jump	1st	
Women's	1999 Outdoor	Trecia Smith	Triple jump	2nd	
Women's	2000 Indoor	Chantee Earl	800 meters	1st	
Women's	2000 Outdoor	Chantee Earl	800 meters	2nd	
Women's	2000 Outdoor	Tia Tabb	4 × 400 meters relay	4th	
Women's	2000 Outdoor	Mera Belisle	4 × 400 meters relay	4th	
Women's	2000 Outdoor	Chantee Earl	4 × 400 meters relay	4th	
Women's	2000 Outdoor	Natasha Peart	4 × 400 meters relay	4th	
Women's	2001 Indoor	Tia Tabb	4 × 400 meters relay	8th	
Women's	2001 Indoor	Mera Belisle	4 × 400 meters relay	8th	
Women's	2001 Indoor	Janine Jones	4 × 400 meters relay	8th	
Women's	2001 Indoor	Tasha Peart	4 × 400 meters relay	8th	
Women's	2001 Indoor	Stacy Taylor	High jump	8th	
Women's	2005 Indoor	Amanda Walker	Shot put	5th	
Women's	2005 Outdoor	Amanda Walker	Shot put	7th	
Women's	2006 Indoor	Maureen McCandless	5000 meters	3rd	
Women's	2006 Indoor	Marissa Dudek	Pole vault	5th	
Men's	2006 Outdoor	Keith Higham	Pole vault	8th	
Men's	2006 Outdoor	Anthony Bonura	Javelin throw	8th	
Women's	2006 Outdoor	Maureen McCandless	5000 meters	7th	
Men's	2007 Indoor	Mike Wray	60 meters hurdles	7th	
Men's	2007 Indoor	Sam Bair	Mile run	7th	
Men's	2008 Indoor	Sam Bair	Mile run	5th	
Men's	2012 Indoor	Brycen Spratling	400 meters	2nd	
Men's	2013 Outdoor	Carvin Nkanata	200 meters	7th	
Men's	2014 Indoor	Carvin Nkanata	200 meters	3rd	
Men's	2014 Indoor	Brycen Spratling	400 meters	6th	
Men's	2014 Indoor	Carvin Nkanata	4 × 400 meters relay	4th	
Men's	2014 Indoor	Desmond Palmer	4 × 400 meters relay	4th	
Men's	2014 Indoor	Brycen Spratling	4 × 400 meters relay	4th	
Men's	2014 Indoor	Dustin Fuller	4 × 400 meters relay	4th	
Men's	2014 Outdoor	Brycen Spratling	400 meters	4th	
Men's	2015 Outdoor	Desmond Palmer	400 meters hurdles	8th	
Men's	2017 Outdoor	Desmond Palmer	110 meters hurdles	7th	
Men's	2017 Outdoor	Desmond Palmer	400 meters hurdles	5th	
Men's	2021 Indoor	Felix Wolter	Heptathlon	4th	
Women's	2023 Indoor	Ilse Steigenga	Long jump	8th	

== See also ==
- Category:Pittsburgh Panthers men's track and field athletes (22)
- Category:Pittsburgh Panthers women's track and field athletes (3)
