= Louisville Cardinals track and field =

College track and field team

- University: University of Louisville
- Head coach: Joe Franklin
- Conference: ACC
- Location: Louisville, Kentucky
- Outdoor track: Cardinal Track Stadium
- Nickname: Cardinals
- Colors: Red and black

The Louisville Cardinals track and field team is the track and field program that represents University of Louisville. The Cardinals compete in NCAA Division I as a member of the Atlantic Coast Conference. The team is based in Louisville, Kentucky at the Cardinal Track Stadium.

The program is coached by Joe Franklin. The track and field program officially encompasses four teams, as the NCAA regards men's and women's indoor track and field and outdoor track and field as separate sports.

D'Ana McCarty was Louisville's first repeat NCAA champion, winning the weight throw for distance at the 2009 and 2010 NCAA Division I Indoor Track and Field Championships.

== Postseason ==
As of 2024, a total of 21 men and 13 women have achieved individual first-team All-American status at the Division I men's outdoor, women's outdoor, men's indoor, or women's indoor national championships.

First team All-Americans
Team	Championships	Name	Event	Place	Ref.
Men's	1929 Outdoor	Charles Brady	High jump	3rd	
Men's	1930 Outdoor	Charles Brady	High jump	2nd	
Men's	1957 Outdoor	Lenny Lyles	100 meters	7th	
Men's	1957 Outdoor	Lenny Lyles	200 meters	4th	
Men's	1997 Outdoor	James Dennis	Discus throw	4th	
Men's	1999 Outdoor	James Dennis	Discus throw	8th	
Men's	2006 Outdoor	Tone Belt	High jump	5th	
Men's	2006 Outdoor	Tone Belt	Long jump	5th	
Women's	2006 Outdoor	Kelley Bowman	High jump	3rd	
Men's	2007 Indoor	Tone Belt	Long jump	1st	
Men's	2007 Indoor	Andre Black	Triple jump	1st	
Men's	2007 Indoor	Arthur Turland	Weight throw	8th	
Men's	2007 Outdoor	Wesley Korir	5000 meters	3rd	
Men's	2007 Outdoor	Tone Belt	Long jump	2nd	
Men's	2007 Outdoor	Andre Black	Triple jump	2nd	
Men's	2008 Outdoor	Andre Black	Triple jump	2nd	
Women's	2009 Indoor	D'Ana McCarty	Weight throw	1st	
Men's	2009 Outdoor	Cory Thorne	3000 meters steeplechase	7th	
Men's	2009 Outdoor	Tone Belt	High jump	7th	
Men's	2010 Indoor	Tone Belt	High jump	6th	
Men's	2010 Indoor	Tone Belt	Long jump	8th	
Women's	2010 Indoor	D'Ana McCarty	Weight throw	1st	
Men's	2010 Outdoor	Matthew Hughes	3000 meters steeplechase	1st	
Men's	2010 Outdoor	Andre Black	Triple jump	4th	
Women's	2010 Outdoor	Jere Summers	Hammer throw	3rd	
Women's	2011 Indoor	D'Ana McCarty	Weight throw	3rd	
Men's	2011 Outdoor	Matthew Hughes	3000 meters steeplechase	1st	
Women's	2011 Outdoor	Rachel Gehret	High jump	5th	
Women's	2011 Outdoor	D'Ana McCarty	Hammer throw	8th	
Women's	2012 Outdoor	Michelle Kinsella	High jump	6th	
Women's	2012 Outdoor	Chinwe Okoro	Shot put	7th	
Men's	2013 Outdoor	Mattias Wolter	3000 meters steeplechase	6th	
Men's	2014 Indoor	Benjamin Williams	Triple jump	4th	
Men's	2015 Indoor	Benjamin Williams	Triple jump	3rd	
Men's	2015 Outdoor	Benjamin Williams	Triple jump	4th	
Women's	2015 Outdoor	Emmonnie Henderson	Discus throw	3rd	
Men's	2016 Indoor	Damar Robinson	High jump	7th	
Men's	2016 Indoor	Benjamin Williams	Triple jump	7th	
Women's	2016 Indoor	Dolly Nyemah	Weight throw	2nd	
Men's	2016 Outdoor	Edwin Kibichiy	3000 meters steeplechase	3rd	
Women's	2017 Indoor	Emmonnie Henderson	Shot put	6th	
Women's	2017 Indoor	Dolly Nyemah	Weight throw	2nd	
Men's	2017 Outdoor	Edwin Kibichiy	3000 meters steeplechase	1st	
Men's	2017 Outdoor	Jerin Allen	High jump	7th	
Women's	2017 Outdoor	Emmonnie Henderson	Shot put	2nd	
Men's	2018 Indoor	Javen Reeves	High jump	8th	
Women's	2018 Indoor	Emmonnie Henderson	Shot put	2nd	
Men's	2018 Outdoor	Joe Delgado	Decathlon	4th	
Women's	2018 Outdoor	Dorcas Wasike	10,000 meters	2nd	
Women's	2019 Indoor	Makenli Forrest	Weight throw	2nd	
Men's	2019 Outdoor	Martice Moore	400 meters hurdles	7th	
Men's	2021 Indoor	Sterling Warner-Savage	60 meters	7th	
Women's	2021 Indoor	Makenli Forrest	Weight throw	1st	
Men's	2022 Indoor	Trey Allen	High jump	8th	
Women's	2022 Indoor	Gabriela Leon	Pole vault	6th	
Men's	2022 Outdoor	Trey Allen	High jump	7th	
Women's	2022 Outdoor	Gabriela Leon	Pole vault	1st	
Men's	2023 Indoor	Cameron Miller	200 meters	4th	
Men's	2023 Indoor	Trey Allen	High jump	3rd	
Women's	2023 Indoor	Synclair Savage	Long jump	7th	
Men's	2023 Outdoor	Cameron Miller	200 meters	8th	
Men's	2023 Outdoor	Nolan Macklin	4 × 100 meters relay	6th	
Men's	2023 Outdoor	Cameron Miller	4 × 100 meters relay	6th	
Men's	2023 Outdoor	Jeremiah Willis	4 × 100 meters relay	6th	
Men's	2023 Outdoor	Sterling Warner-Savage	4 × 100 meters relay	6th	
Men's	2023 Outdoor	Trey Allen	High jump	4th	
Women's	2023 Outdoor	Synclair Savage	Long jump	8th	
Women's	2024 Indoor	Jayden Ulrich	Shot put	6th	
Men's	2024 Outdoor	Ian Kibiwot	10,000 meters	6th	
Women's	2024 Outdoor	Jayden Ulrich	Shot put	4th	
Women's	2024 Outdoor	Jayden Ulrich	Discus throw	2nd	

== See also ==
- Category:Louisville Cardinals men's track and field athletes (7)
- Category:Louisville Cardinals women's track and field athletes (4)
