= Kent State Golden Flashes track and field =

American college track and field team

- University: Kent State University
- Head coach: Nathan Fanger
- Conference: MAC
- Location: Kent, Ohio
- Outdoor track: Kent State Outdoor Track
- Nickname: Golden Flashes
- Colors: Navy blue and gold

The Kent State Golden Flashes track and field team is the track and field program that represents Kent State University. The Golden Flashes compete in NCAA Division I as a member of the Mid-American Conference. The team is based in Kent, Ohio, at the Kent State Outdoor Track.

The program is coached by Nathan Fanger. The track and field program officially encompasses four teams because the NCAA considers men's and women's indoor track and field and outdoor track and field as separate sports.

The team has won seven NCAA titles in the hammer throw and weight throw. Six of those were won by Jacques Accambray and Al Schoterman in the 1970s.

== Postseason ==
=== AIAW ===
The Golden Flashes have had one AIAW All-American finishing in the top six at the AIAW indoor or outdoor championships.

AIAW All-Americans
Championships	Name	Event	Place
1980 Outdoor	Cathy Calo	Javelin throw	4th

=== NCAA ===
As of August 2025, a total of 32 men and 21 women have achieved individual first-team All-American status for the team at the Division I men's outdoor, women's outdoor, men's indoor, or women's indoor national championships (using the modern criteria of top-8 placing regardless of athlete nationality).

First team NCAA All-Americans
Team	Championships	Name	Event	Place	Ref.
Men's	1965 Indoor	Ron Hughes	55 meters hurdles	2nd	
Men's	1965 Indoor	Marty Elsner	Shot put	5th	
Men's	1965 Outdoor	Pierson Lorandeau	5000 meters	8th	
Men's	1965 Outdoor	Pierson Lorandeau	10,000 meters	5th	
Men's	1966 Indoor	Sam Bair	Mile run	2nd	
Men's	1966 Indoor	Joe Kuzma	Weight throw	5th	
Men's	1966 Outdoor	Sam Bair	Mile run	5th	
Men's	1967 Indoor	Sam Bair	Mile run	2nd	
Men's	1967 Outdoor	Orin Richburg	200 meters	6th	
Men's	1967 Outdoor	Sam Bair	Mile run	3rd	
Men's	1968 Indoor	Sam Bair	Mile run	2nd	
Men's	1968 Outdoor	Sam Bair	1500 meters	4th	
Men's	1969 Indoor	Ed Norris	3000 meters	5th	
Men's	1969 Outdoor	Orin Richburg	200 meters	7th	
Men's	1969 Outdoor	Art Coolidge	5000 meters	5th	
Men's	1969 Outdoor	Art Coolidge	10,000 meters	4th	
Men's	1970 Outdoor	Ed Norris	5000 meters	8th	
Men's	1970 Outdoor	Al Schoterman	Hammer throw	4th	
Men's	1971 Indoor	Al Schoterman	Weight throw	1st	
Men's	1971 Indoor	Jacques Accambray	Weight throw	2nd	
Men's	1971 Outdoor	Jacques Accambray	Hammer throw	1st	
Men's	1971 Outdoor	Al Schoterman	Hammer throw	2nd	
Men's	1972 Indoor	Jacques Accambray	Weight throw	1st	
Men's	1972 Indoor	Al Schoterman	Weight throw	2nd	
Men's	1972 Outdoor	Al Schoterman	Hammer throw	1st	
Men's	1972 Outdoor	Jacques Accambray	Hammer throw	2nd	
Men's	1973 Indoor	Gerald Tinker	55 meters	1st	
Men's	1973 Indoor	Ted Harris	800 meters	3rd	
Men's	1973 Indoor	Jacques Accambray	Weight throw	3rd	
Men's	1973 Outdoor	Jacques Accambray	Hammer throw	1st	
Men's	1974 Indoor	Jacques Accambray	Weight throw	1st	
Men's	1974 Outdoor	Jacques Accambray	Hammer throw	5th	
Men's	1976 Indoor	Joseph Dubina	Mile run	4th	
Men's	1976 Indoor	Fred Breidenbach	Weight throw	5th	
Men's	1976 Outdoor	Bob Francis	High jump	6th	
Men's	1978 Indoor	Fred Breidenbach	Weight throw	5th	
Men's	1979 Indoor	Terry Carter	55 meters	3rd	
Women's	1983 Outdoor	Kathy Calo	Javelin throw	8th	
Men's	1985 Outdoor	Thomas Jefferson	100 meters	3rd	
Men's	1988 Indoor	Angus Cooper	Weight throw	3rd	
Men's	1988 Outdoor	John O'Connor	Hammer throw	7th	
Men's	1989 Indoor	Dail Harper	Shot put	5th	
Men's	1989 Outdoor	John O'Connor	Hammer throw	3rd	
Women's	1991 Indoor	Stevanie Wadsworth	Shot put	3rd	
Women's	1993 Outdoor	Debbie Duplay	800 meters	7th	
Women's	1994 Indoor	Jennifer Buckley	800 meters	7th	
Women's	1994 Outdoor	Jennifer Buckley	800 meters	4th	
Women's	1994 Outdoor	Mindy Wirtz	Discus throw	7th	
Women's	1995 Indoor	Jennifer Buckley	800 meters	2nd	
Women's	1995 Outdoor	Jennifer Buckley	800 meters	3rd	
Women's	1995 Outdoor	Mindy Wirtz	Discus throw	2nd	
Women's	1996 Outdoor	Mindy Wirtz	Discus throw	8th	
Women's	1997 Outdoor	Roberta Collins	Discus throw	5th	
Women's	1997 Outdoor	Kim Kreiner	Javelin throw	3rd	
Men's	1998 Indoor	Bobby Cruse	200 meters	5th	
Men's	1998 Indoor	Mike Caza	High jump	8th	
Men's	1998 Outdoor	Brendan Falconer	Decathlon	3rd	
Women's	1998 Outdoor	Shannon Gallagher	Pole vault	8th	
Women's	1998 Outdoor	Kim Kreiner	Javelin throw	7th	
Men's	1999 Indoor	Bobby Cruse	200 meters	7th	
Women's	1999 Indoor	Leslie Vidmar	Shot put	5th	
Women's	1999 Outdoor	Leslie Vidmar	Shot put	2nd	
Women's	1999 Outdoor	Roberta Collins	Discus throw	8th	
Men's	2000 Indoor	Ron Andrews	60 meters hurdles	5th	
Women's	2000 Outdoor	Beth Obruba	Discus throw	7th	
Women's	2000 Outdoor	Beth Obruba	Javelin throw	4th	
Women's	2000 Outdoor	Kim Kreiner	Javelin throw	5th	
Men's	2001 Indoor	Bobby Cruse	200 meters	7th	
Women's	2002 Outdoor	Aja Farris	400 meters hurdles	5th	
Women's	2003 Indoor	Alexandra Church	High jump	2nd	
Men's	2004 Indoor	Mike Inge	800 meters	7th	
Women's	2004 Indoor	Jackie Rodgers	Pole vault	7th	
Men's	2005 Indoor	Mike Inge	800 meters	5th	
Women's	2005 Indoor	Colleen Ramharak	Triple jump	7th	
Women's	2005 Outdoor	Jackie Rodgers	Pole vault	5th	
Women's	2005 Outdoor	Julie Ward	Javelin throw	5th	
Men's	2007 Outdoor	Chris Caine	Decathlon	8th	
Women's	2009 Indoor	Nia Henderson	Weight throw	5th	
Women's	2009 Outdoor	Kim Hamilton	Javelin throw	5th	
Women's	2010 Indoor	Diana Dumitrescu	Pentathlon	8th	
Women's	2010 Outdoor	Diana Dumitrescu	Heptathlon	6th	
Women's	2011 Outdoor	Diana Dumitrescu	Heptathlon	8th	
Women's	2013 Indoor	Dior Delophont	High jump	5th	
Women's	2013 Indoor	Dior Delophont	Triple jump	5th	
Women's	2013 Outdoor	Danniel Thomas-Dodd	Discus throw	8th	
Men's	2014 Indoor	Matthias Tayala	Weight throw	5th	
Women's	2014 Indoor	Dior Delophont	High jump	3rd	
Men's	2014 Outdoor	Matthias Tayala	Hammer throw	1st	
Women's	2014 Outdoor	Danniel Thomas-Dodd	Discus throw	2nd	
Men's	2015 Indoor	Matthias Tayala	Weight throw	6th	
Women's	2015 Indoor	Dior Delophont	High jump	8th	
Women's	2015 Indoor	Danniel Thomas-Dodd	Shot put	7th	
Men's	2015 Outdoor	Matthias Tayala	Hammer throw	2nd	
Men's	2016 Outdoor	Reggie Jagers III	Discus throw	7th	
Women's	2017 Indoor	Danniel Thomas-Dodd	Shot put	2nd	
Men's	2017 Outdoor	Craig Stevens	Triple jump	7th	
Men's	2017 Outdoor	Reggie Jagers III	Discus throw	2nd	
Women's	2017 Outdoor	Danniel Thomas-Dodd	Shot put	1st	
Women's	2017 Outdoor	Danniel Thomas-Dodd	Discus throw	4th	
Men's	2018 Indoor	T.J. Lawson	Heptathlon	5th	
Men's	2021 Indoor	Jake Wickey	Weight throw	8th	
Women's	2021 Indoor	Gabrielle Bailey	Shot put	6th	
Women's	2021 Outdoor	Gabrielle Bailey	Discus throw	6th	
Men's	2022 Indoor	Jake Wickey	Weight throw	2nd	
Men's	2025 Indoor	Alexandre Malanda	Triple jump	7th	

== See also ==
- Category:Kent State Golden Flashes men's track and field athletes (9)
- Category:Kent State Golden Flashes women's track and field athletes (3)
