= Nevada Wolf Pack track and field =

American college track and field team

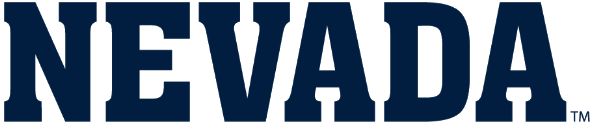
- University: University of Nevada, Reno
- Head coach: Shantel Twiggs
- Conference: MW
- Location: Reno, Nevada
- Outdoor track: Mackay Stadium
- Nickname: Wolf Pack
- Colors: Navy blue and silver

The Nevada Wolf Pack track and field team is the track and field program that represents University of Nevada, Reno. The Wolf Pack compete in NCAA Division I as a member of the Mountain West Conference. The team is based in Reno, Nevada, at the Mackay Stadium.

The program is coached by Shantel Twiggs. The track and field program officially encompasses four teams because the NCAA considers men's and women's indoor track and field and outdoor track and field as separate sports.

The men's track and field team was founded just after World War I. In 1992, javelin thrower Kamy Keshmiri became the school's first three-time NCAA champion.

Following the 1993 season, the men's team was cut due to budget cuts. The men's teams had a US$200,000 budget.

== Postseason ==
As of August 2025, a total of 11 men and 4 women have achieved individual first-team All-American status for the team at the Division I men's outdoor, women's outdoor, men's indoor, or women's indoor national championships (using the modern criteria of top-8 placing regardless of athlete nationality).

First team NCAA All-Americans
Team	Championships	Name	Event	Place	Ref.
Men's	1960 Outdoor	Bob Ritchie	Long jump	7th	
Men's	1966 Indoor	Otis Burrell	High jump	1st	
Men's	1966 Outdoor	Otis Burrell	High jump	1st	
Men's	1968 Outdoor	Vic Simmons	110 meters hurdles	6th	
Men's	1972 Outdoor	Peter Duffy	10,000 meters	5th	
Men's	1974 Outdoor	Domingo Tibaduiza	5000 meters	7th	
Men's	1974 Outdoor	Domingo Tibaduiza	10,000 meters	3rd	
Men's	1975 Outdoor	Domingo Tibaduiza	5000 meters	3rd	
Men's	1975 Outdoor	Domingo Tibaduiza	10,000 meters	2nd	
Men's	1983 Outdoor	Derrick May	10,000 meters	7th	
Men's	1990 Outdoor	Kamy Keshmiri	Discus throw	1st	
Men's	1991 Outdoor	Kamy Keshmiri	Discus throw	1st	
Men's	1991 Outdoor	Kim Johansson	Hammer throw	7th	
Men's	1992 Indoor	John Burrell	Long jump	6th	
Men's	1992 Outdoor	Kamy Keshmiri	Discus throw	1st	
Men's	1994 Outdoor	Brandon Rock	800 meters	8th	
Men's	1994 Outdoor	Enoch Borozinski	Decathlon	1st	
Women's	1994 Outdoor	Ali McKnight	Heptathlon	5th	
Women's	1995 Outdoor	Ali McKnight	Heptathlon	2nd	
Women's	2002 Outdoor	Jennifer Ashcroft	Pole vault	7th	
Women's	2004 Outdoor	Nicole Petty	800 meters	6th	
Women's	2006 Outdoor	Caira Hane	Hammer throw	8th	

== See also ==
- Category:Nevada Wolf Pack men's track and field athletes (8)
- Category:Nevada Wolf Pack track and field coaches (3)
