= Keith Francis =

Keith Francis may refer to:

- Keith Francis (cricketer)
- Keith Francis (runner)
