= Lermond =

Lermond is a surname. Notable people with the surname include:

- George Lermond (1904–1940), American long-distance runner
- Leo Lermond (1906–1986), American long-distance runner
- Norman Wallace Lermond (1861–1944), American naturalist and socialist activist
