= George Frenn =

American hammer thrower and weight thrower

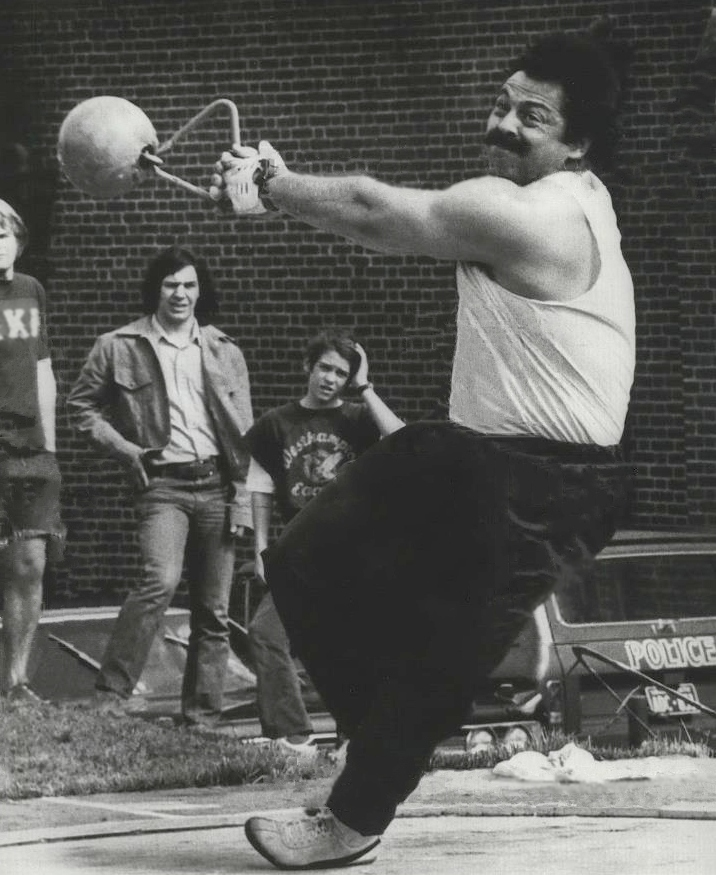
- Frenn in 1973

Personal information
- Born: December 26, 1941 San Fernando, California
- Died: June 26, 2006 (aged 64) Sacramento, California
- Height: 180 cm (5 ft 11 in)
- Weight: 111 kg (245 lb)

Sport
- Sport: Athletics
- Events: Hammer throw, discus throw
- Club: Pacific Coast Club, Long Beach

Achievements and titles
- Personal bests: HT – 70.89 m (1970); DT – 47.52 m (1962)
Medal record
Representing United States
Pan American Games
Silver medal – second place	1971 Cali	Hammer throw
Bronze medal – third place	1967 Winnipeg	Hammer throw

George Michael Frenn (December 26, 1941 – June 26, 2006) was an American hammer thrower, weight thrower and powerlifter. Frenn set world bests in the outdoor and indoor weight throws, won two medals in the Pan American Games and competed in the 1972 Summer Olympics.

== Track and field career ==
Frenn took up track and field in 1957 at North Hollywood High School, initially competing as a runner rather than a thrower. He got interested in hammer throwing in 1959 after seeing Olympic champion and world record holder Hal Connolly throw in a local meet. He improved rapidly, placing sixth at the 1962 NCAA championships with 169 ft 7 in (51.69 m); in that meet, he represented Abilene Christian University, a school he only briefly attended. In 1963 he showed good form from the early spring and placed second behind defending champion Al Hall at the national (AAU) championships, throwing 198 ft 10 in (60.60 m); Track & Field News ranked him the third-best American that year, behind Connolly and Hall. Nevertheless, he failed to gain selection either to the Pan American Games or the dual meet against the Soviet Union in Moscow.

Frenn suffered an injury in April 1964 and lost his best form; he returned to the NCAA championships, this time throwing for Long Beach State, but again only placed sixth. He slipped from third to ninth in the United States and failed to qualify for the 1964 Summer Olympics, although with the emergence of Ed Burke as a third top thrower alongside Hall and Connolly, making the Olympic team would in any case have required Frenn to improve his personal best considerably. In 1965 Frenn placed third behind Connolly and Burke at the national championships, throwing 210 ft 2 in (64.06 m), and regained his ranking as #3 in the United States. Frenn injured his back in training in August 1965, and then his leg just before the 1966 national indoor championships, where he would have competed in the 35-lb weight throw. At the 1966 outdoor championships Frenn only threw 199 ft 5 in (60.78 m) and placed fourth.

By 1967, the outdoor 56-lb weight throw had become an obscure event; it rarely featured in meets, had only been contested once at the AAU national championships after 1959, and the International Amateur Athletic Federation didn't ratify official world records in it. Nevertheless, Frenn took it up that year after a friend mailed him a free weight; in his first competition with the outdoor weight he threw 45 ft 10 1/2 in (13.98 m), which would have broken Bob Backus's world best of 45 ft 2 in (13.77 m) from 1957, but his implement was found to have been slightly too light. Later that year he legitimately broke the record at the Rose Bowl Invitational, smashing Backus's mark with a throw of 48 ft 3/4 in (14.64 m). Frenn also improved in the hammer, throwing 220 ft 11 in (67.34 m) in Sacramento on June 10 for a new personal best; at the national championships he threw 213 ft 7 in (65.10 m) and placed second as the winner, Burke, set a new American record of 235 ft 11 in (71.91 m). Frenn was selected for the 1967 Pan American Games in Winnipeg, where he placed third with a throw of 64.08 m (210 ft 3 in) as fellow American Tom Gage won gold.

In 1968 Frenn placed second at the national championships with a throw of 214 ft 11 in (65.51 m), but at the Olympic Trials, which were held separately, he only managed 210 ft 1 in (64.03 m) and missed out in fourth place as Burke, Hall and Connolly qualified for the team for the second consecutive Olympics. In November, after the Olympics, Frenn improved his personal best to 226 ft 6 in (69.04 m) in Long Beach. In 1969 Frenn threw the 35-pound indoor weight 73 ft 3 1/2 in (22.33 m) to beat Connolly's world best from 1960; he also broke his own world best in the 56-pound weight throw that year, improving to 49 ft 7 in (15.11 m). In the hammer, Frenn placed second in the AAU meet for the third consecutive year; despite throwing 227 ft 2 in (69.24 m), he still lost to Gage by a foot and three inches. Nevertheless, Track & Field News ranked him the #1 hammer thrower in the United States for the first time, ahead of Connolly and Gage.

Frenn won his first national track and field championship title (he had previously become national champion in powerlifting) at the 1970 AAU indoor championships, throwing the 35-pound weight 70 ft 5 1/2 in (21.47 m) to beat Connolly, Gage and Hall. That summer he also won his first national title in the hammer throw, throwing 230 feet (70 m) and beating Gage by a foot and seven inches; in practice before the championships he reportedly threw 248 feet (76 m), which would have been a world record if duplicated in competition. His best in official meets was 232 ft 7 in (70.89 m), which he reached in Berkeley on May 30; that mark was then the third-best by an American, and would remain his career best. He appeared on the cover of the Sports Illustrated's July 6, 1970, issue.

In 1971 Frenn repeated as national champion in both the hammer and the indoor weight and was ranked the #1 hammer thrower in the United States for the third consecutive year; in the indoor weight, he broke Connolly's meeting record from the 1960 championships with his throw of 71 ft 4 in (21.74 m). He also broke his own world best in the outdoor weight for a final time, reaching 49 ft 8 1/2 in (15.15 m). At the 1971 Pan American Games in Cali he won silver in the hammer with a throw of 65.68 m (215 ft 5 3/4 in), losing to Hall by only six and a half inches. In 1972 he won his third consecutive title in the indoor weight, breaking his championship record from the previous year with a throw of 72 ft 4 in (22.05 m). Later that winter he threw 74 ft 2 3/4 in (22.62 m) in a dual meet against the Soviet Union to break his own world record. That summer Frenn finally qualified for his first Olympics, albeit narrowly; with his throw of 224 ft 7 in (68.45 m), he placed third at the 1972 Olympic Trials and got the last spot on the team behind Gage and Al Schoterman. At the Olympics in Munich he only reached 62.14 m (203 ft 10 in), placing 27th in the qualification round and failing to qualify for the final.

Frenn's results in the hammer started slipping after 1972, and he never placed in the top three at the national outdoor championships again, although in 1973 he was still ranked second in the country despite only placing sixth in the AAU meet. He remained a top weight thrower, however; between 1970 and 1977 he won six indoor national titles, only missing out in 1974 (when he was the best American but lost to France's Jacques Accambray) and in 1976, when he was a close second behind Larry Hart. In 1975, he competed as a hammer thrower in his third Pan American Games, but only placed seventh with a throw of 63.22 m (207 ft 5 in). He announced his retirement from track and field after the 1980 national indoor championships.

== Other sports ==
Frenn was also a good powerlifter, although he mostly approached that sport as training for hammer throwing; consequently, he concentrated on the squat and deadlift more than the bench press, as bench press was less good for his throws. In 1967 he became the first national powerlifting champion in the 242 pounds (110 kg) weight class despite the runners-up comfortably beating him in the bench press. His world record in the squat of 853 pounds stood for 13 years, and it took 11 years for even the super heavyweight athletes to exceed that number. Frenn helped promote powerlifting and challenged the authority of Bob Hoffman in the sport; with Joe Weider, Frenn organized one of the first international powerlifting meets, a competition between American and British lifters, in 1970 despite opposition from Hoffman.

Frenn competed in the first World's Strongest Man contest in 1977, but placed eighth and last.

== Later life ==
Frenn worked as a high school teacher in California for thirty-two years. Frenn worked at Cerritos High School in Cerritos, California, where he was both a weightlifting coach (Physical Education) and science teacher. In 1982 he helped his friend Tom Waddell promote the inaugural Gay Olympics in San Francisco and carried the torch into the stadium during the opening ceremonies; he also competed in the meet, winning gold in the hammer throw. Frenn, who was not homosexual, later regretted this, as being mistaken for gay interfered with his teaching and social relationships. Frenn died in Sacramento, California, on June 26, 2006.
