= Boston College Eagles track and field =

College track and field team

- University: Boston College
- Head coach: Pete Watson
- Conference: ACC
- Location: Chestnut Hill, Massachusetts
- Indoor track: The Track at New Balance
- Nickname: Eagles
- Colors: Maroon and gold

The Boston College Eagles track and field team is the track and field program that represents Boston College. The Eagles compete in NCAA Division I as a member of the Atlantic Coast Conference. The team is based in Chestnut Hill, Massachusetts at The Track at New Balance.

The program is coached by Pete Watson. The track and field program officially encompasses four teams, as the NCAA regards men's and women's indoor track and field and outdoor track and field as separate sports.

The team is most known for its hammer and weight throwing program, beginning with Hal Connolly who won the gold medal in the hammer throw at the 1956 Olympics. John Fiore, George Desnoyers, and Sean McGehearty have also won NCAA national titles in the hammer or weight throw.

== Postseason ==
As of 2024, a total of 14 men and 7 women have achieved individual first-team All-American status at the men's outdoor, women's outdoor, men's indoor, or women's indoor national championships.

First team All-Americans
Team	Championships	Name	Event	Place	Ref.
Men's	1935 Outdoor	Dimitri Zaitz	Shot put	4th	
Men's	1937 Outdoor	Richard Gill	400 meters	5th	
Men's	1937 Outdoor	Dimitri Zaitz	Shot put	2nd	
Men's	1944 Outdoor	Herb McKenley	400 meters	2nd	
Men's	1962 Outdoor	Samir Vincent	Triple jump	3rd	
Men's	1962 Outdoor	George Desnoyers	Hammer throw	2nd	
Men's	1963 Outdoor	George Desnoyers	Hammer throw	1st	
Men's	1965 Outdoor	John Fiore	Hammer throw	1st	
Men's	1966 Indoor	John Fiore	Weight throw	2nd	
Men's	1966 Indoor	James Kavanaugh	Weight throw	4th	
Men's	1966 Outdoor	John Fiore	Hammer throw	1st	
Men's	1966 Outdoor	James Kavanaugh	Hammer throw	3rd	
Men's	1967 Indoor	James Kavanaugh	Weight throw	2nd	
Men's	1967 Outdoor	James Kavanaugh	Hammer throw	3rd	
Men's	1968 Indoor	James Kavanaugh	Weight throw	2nd	
Men's	1968 Outdoor	James Kavanaugh	Hammer throw	2nd	
Men's	1973 Indoor	Keith Francis	1000 meters	2nd	
Men's	1974 Indoor	Keith Francis	1000 meters	2nd	
Men's	1974 Outdoor	Keith Francis	800 meters	2nd	
Men's	1975 Indoor	Keith Francis	1000 meters	1st	
Men's	1975 Outdoor	Keith Francis	800 meters	4th	
Men's	1976 Indoor	Keith Francis	1000 meters	2nd	
Men's	1976 Outdoor	Bill Martin	800 meters	6th	
Men's	1985 Indoor	Jim Kenney	Weight throw	5th	
Men's	1986 Indoor	Jim Kenney	Weight throw	4th	
Men's	1986 Outdoor	John Clopeck	5000 meters	6th	
Men's	1987 Outdoor	Joe Rocha	10,000 meters	4th	
Men's	1995 Indoor	Mark McGehearty	Weight throw	6th	
Women's	1995 Indoor	Angela Graham	Mile run	5th	
Women's	1995 Indoor	Caroline Pimblett	Distance medley relay	8th	
Women's	1995 Indoor	Mary Brady	Distance medley relay	8th	
Women's	1995 Indoor	Amy Lyman	Distance medley relay	8th	
Women's	1995 Indoor	Angie Graham	Distance medley relay	8th	
Women's	1995 Outdoor	Angela Graham	1500 meters	6th	
Men's	1996 Indoor	Mark McGehearty	Weight throw	2nd	
Men's	1996 Indoor	Sean McGehearty	Weight throw	4th	
Men's	1996 Outdoor	Sean McGehearty	Hammer throw	4th	
Men's	1996 Outdoor	Mark McGehearty	Hammer throw	8th	
Men's	1997 Indoor	Sean McGehearty	Weight throw	1st	
Men's	1997 Indoor	Mark McGehearty	Weight throw	2nd	
Women's	1997 Indoor	Angela Graham	Mile run	4th	
Men's	1997 Outdoor	Sean McGehearty	Hammer throw	5th	
Men's	1997 Outdoor	Mark McGehearty	Hammer throw	7th	
Women's	1997 Outdoor	Angela Graham	3000 meters	5th	
Women's	1998 Indoor	Angela Graham	Mile run	2nd	
Women's	1998 Outdoor	Angela Graham	1500 meters	7th	
Women's	2000 Outdoor	Shannon Smith	3000 meters	6th	
Women's	2001 Indoor	Shannon Smith	3000 meters	1st	
Women's	2002 Outdoor	Maria Cicero	10,000 meters	5th	
Women's	2004 Outdoor	Jennifer Kramer	5000 meters	7th	
Women's	2007 Indoor	Kasey Hill	Pentathlon	8th	
Women's	2008 Outdoor	Kasey Hill	Heptathlon	7th	
Women's	2011 Indoor	Caroline King	Mile run	7th	
Women's	2012 Outdoor	Caroline King	800 meters	8th	
Women's	2015 Outdoor	Liv Westphal	5000 meters	8th	

== See also ==
- Category:Boston College Eagles men's track and field athletes (11)
- Category:Boston College Eagles women's track and field athletes (2)
