= William Rea (long jumper) =

Austrian long jumper

Personal information
- Nationality: Austrian
- Born: 3 February 1952 (age 73)

Sport
- Sport: Athletics
- Event: Long jump

William Rea (born 3 February 1952) is an Austrian athlete. He competed in the men's long jump at the 1980 Summer Olympics.

Rea was a seven-time All American for the Pittsburgh Panthers track and field team in the NCAA. His best finish was 2nd in the long jump at the 1974 NCAA Indoor Track and Field Championships.
