= Samir Vincent =

American lobbyist and Olympic athlete

Samir Vincent also known as Samir Ambrose Vincent (born 23 October 1940) is an ethnic Assyrian Iraqi American that pleaded guilty in January 2005 to being an unregistered agent for the Iraqi government and reselling oil from the Oil-for-Food Programme to "reap profits totalling millions of dollars". Earlier in his life, he was an Olympic sprinter, hurdler, and triple jumper for Iraq at the 1964 Summer Olympics.

== Oil-for-Food Programme Scandal ==
In the aftermath of the Gulf War, the U.N. imposed sanctions on Iraq. As an unregistered agent for the Iraqi government, Vincent began lobbying in the U.S. for an end to the U.N. sanctions on the sale of Iraqi oil. Vincent remained largely unsuccessful in his efforts until 1992 when he was introduced to Tongsun Park, who arranged for him to meet Boutros Boutros-Ghali, then the secretary-general of the United Nations. The Oil-for-Food Programme was set up to allow Iraq to sell its oil in return for humanitarian relief, so it would not breach sanctions imposed after the first Iraq war. However it transpired that the former Iraqi regime - which decided who could buy Iraqi oil - used the scheme to bribe people by awarding them contracts in return for a surcharge.

Vincent eventually admitted to charges of fraud, tax violations and acting and conspiring to act as an unregistered agent of the Iraqi government.

== Athletics career ==
At the 1962 NCAA track and field championships, Vincent was an All-American in the triple jump for the Boston College track and field team. He later went on to represent Iraq at the 1964 Summer Olympics in Tokyo, taking part in the 110 metres hurdles, 400 metres hurdles, triple jump, and 4 x 100 metres relay.
