= James Dennis (athlete) =

American discus thrower (born 1976)

Personal information
- Full name: James Omar Montia Dennis
- Nickname: James Dennis
- Nationality: United States
- Born: February 25, 1976 (age 50) Cleveland, Ohio
- Height: 1.96 m (6 ft 5 in)
- Weight: 120 kg (265 lb)

Sport
- Country: United States United States
- College team: University of Louisville

James O. Dennis (born 25 February 1976) is an American discus thrower. His personal best throw is 63.55 metres, achieved in June 2008 in Chula Vista, California.

Dennis was a two-time All-American for the Louisville Cardinals track and field team, placing 4th at the 1997 NCAA Division I Outdoor Track and Field Championships.

Dennis remains an active Masters athlete, winning the 2018 World Masters Athletics Championships and the 2024 World Masters Athletics Championships, among other championships.
