= George Lermond =

American long-distance runner

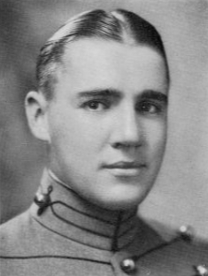
- As a West Point cadet

Personal information
- Nationality: American
- Born: George William Lermond; November 29, 1904 Nahant, Massachusetts
- Died: July 6, 1940 (aged 35) La Plata, Maryland

Sport
- Sport: Long-distance running
- Events: 5000 metres 10,000 metres 3000 metres steeplechase
- College team: Boston College
- Coached by: Jack Ryder

George William Lermond (November 29, 1904 – July 6, 1940) was an American long-distance runner. He competed in the men's 5000 metres at the 1924 Summer Olympics.

== Early life ==
A native of Nahant, Massachusetts, Lermond attended Boston College High School and Boston College. His brother, Leo Lermond was also a long-distance runner.

== Track ==
Lermond was a member of the Boston College Eagles track and field team. As a junior, he won the three-mile race at the Millrose Games. He won the six mile race at the 1925 USA Outdoor Track and Field Championships. At the 1932 Eastern United States trials, Lermond broke the world record for the 3000 metres steeplechase. He finished next to last in the same event at the final tryouts in Palo Alto, California and did not make that year's Olympic team. He won the 3 miles at the 1932 USA Indoor Track and Field Championships and the 5000 metres at the 1933 USA Indoor Track and Field Championships.

== Military career ==
Congressman James A. Gallivan secured Lermond an appointment to the United States Military Academy. He graduated in 1930. In 1934, he married Edith V. Lloyd, the daughter of a United States Army Medical Corps officer. They had three children. The family lived in China while Lermond was attached to the 15th Infantry Regiment. They were in Tianjin during the Battle of Beiping–Tianjin. By 1940, he was a captain and stationed at Fort Lewis.

== Death ==
On July 6, 1940, Lermond, his wife, and children were staying at the home of his wife's parents. A fire broke out in the house and Lermond rushed into the nursery and removed his four-year old son, William, and 15-month old daughter, Edith. Lermond went back for George Lermond Jr., but was overcome by smoke and they both died in the fire. He was buried at Arlington National Cemetery, after President Franklin Roosevelt gave his permission.
