= Eric Cannon =

American track and field athlete

Personal information
- Born: March 2, 1967 (age 59)
- Home town: Wilmington, Delaware, U.S.

Sport
- Sport: Track and field
- Event: Hurdling
- College team: Pittsburgh
Medal record
Men's athletics
Representing Pittsburgh Panthers
NCAA Outdoor Championships
Silver medal – second place	1989 Provo	110 m hurdles

Eric Cannon (born March 2, 1967) is an American former track and field athlete. He is considered one of the greatest hurdlers in Delaware history.

== Biography ==
Cannon was born on March 2, 1967, and grew up in Wilmington, Delaware. He attended Concord High School for one year before transferring to Delcastle Technical High School for his last three years. There, he was a football player (at halfback) and standout track and field athlete, specializing in the hurdles. As a sophomore in 1983, Cannon started setting school records (including a 7.46-second 60 metres hurdles run which was fifth-best nationally) and won the state championship in the 110 metres hurdles.

The following year, Cannon repeated as state champion in the 110 metres hurdles, while also being the state champion in the 55 metres hurdles and 50-yard dash. At the start of 1985, he set a meet record in the 50-yard hurdles. He then won the state championships in the 110 metres hurdles, 55 metres hurdles, 50-yard dash and 100 metres. He competed at the National Scholastic Indoor Championships where he won the 55 metres hurdles and set a Delaware record that lasted for 35 years. He also set a state record in the 110 metres hurdles that stood for 34 years. He was widely reported to be among the best track and field athletes in state history, and The News Journal called him Delaware's "greatest high hurdler".

Cannon accepted a full athletic scholarship to compete at the collegiate level for the Pittsburgh Panthers. As a freshman in 1986, Cannon was an All-American, set the Pittsburgh record for 50-yard hurdles, and was named All-Big East Conference. In his time at Pittsburgh, Cannon received six All-America selections, twice was a Big East champion and IC4A champion, and set four records still standing as of 2024. He led Pittsburgh to its first Big East track title in 1989, with Cannon placing first in two events. He won the 1989 Penn Relays in the 110 metres hurdles and came .02 seconds away from winning the national championship (placing second), running what was then the third-fastest time ever among college athletes in the U.S.

After Cannon graduated from Pittsburgh, he worked as a clerk for a law firm and coached at Delcastle.

Cannon was inducted into the Delaware Track and Field Hall of Fame in 2000. In February 2024, The News Journal ranked him 16th among the "30 greatest sprinters, throwers and jumpers" in Delaware history. Later that year, he was selected for induction to the Delaware Sports Museum and Hall of Fame.
