= Athletics at the 2007 Pan American Games – Women's hammer throw =

Women's hammer throw at the Pan American Games

The women's hammer throw event at the 2007 Pan American Games was held on July 23.

== Results ==
Rank	Athlete	Nationality	#1	#2	#3	#4	#5	#6	Result	Notes
1st place, gold medalist(s)	Yipsi Moreno	Cuba	x	73.44	71.37	x	x	75.20	75.20	GR
2nd place, silver medalist(s)	Arasay Thondike	Cuba	66.07	67.88	x	x	67.89	68.70	68.70	
3rd place, bronze medalist(s)	Jennifer Dahlgren	Argentina	x	68.32	x	x	x	68.37	68.37	
4	Kristal Yush	United States	65.90	62.48	65.34	65.80	66.47	66.03	66.47	
5	Brittany Riley	United States	60.78	62.64	x	65.49	x	x	65.49	
6	Crystal Smith	Canada	61.48	62.22	64.78	64.64	x	61.29	64.78	
7	Sultana Frizell	Canada	62.67	63.25	61.53	x	62.59	62.38	63.25	
8	Johana Moreno	Colombia	x	60.15	62.77	62.11	x	58.91	62.77	
9	Candice Scott	Trinidad and Tobago	58.25	62.21	61.64				62.21	
10	Josiane Soares	Brazil	62.13	60.00	61.73				62.13	SB
11	Amarilys Alméstica	Puerto Rico	58.04	61.44	59.42				61.44	
12	Katiuscia de Jesus	Brazil	56.78	59.23	58.95				59.23	
13	Odette Palma	Chile	55.63	53.84	53.69				55.63	
14	Amyra Albury	Bahamas	55.33	x	54.53				55.33	
15	Natalie Grant	Jamaica	53.91	x	x				53.91	
16	Stefania Zoryez	Uruguay	x	x	51.08				51.08	
