= Dimitri Zaitz =

American shot putter (1917–1996)

Personal information
- Born: November 7, 1917 Boston, Massachusetts, U.S.
- Died: January 26, 1996 (aged 78) Concord, Massachusetts, U.S.

Sport
- Sport: Athletics
- Event: Shot put
- College team: Boston College
- Coached by: Jack Ryder

Dimitri Zaitz (November 7, 1917 – January 26, 1996) was an American athlete. He competed in the men's shot put at the 1936 Summer Olympics. As a member of the Boston College Eagles track and field team, he competed in the 1935 and 1937 NCAA Track and Field Championships.
