= Athletics at the 1994 Commonwealth Games – Women's heptathlon =

Women's heptathlon at the Commonwealth Games

The women's heptathlon event at the 1994 Commonwealth Games was held at the Centennial Stadium in Victoria, British Columbia on 22 and 23 August.

== Results ==
The highest mark recorded in each event is highlighted in yellow

Rank	Athlete	Nationality	100m H	HJ	SP	200m	LJ	JT	800m	Points	Notes
1st place, gold medalist(s)	Denise Lewis	England	13.66	1.74	13.22	25.11	6.44	53.68	2:17.60	6325	
2nd place, silver medalist(s)	Jane Flemming	Australia	13.32	1.77	14.10	24.06	6.29	39.76	2:13.07	6317	
3rd place, bronze medalist(s)	Catherine Bond-Mills	Canada	13.79	1.86	13.57	24.64	6.22	37.62	2:14.04	6193	
4	Joanne Henry	New Zealand	14.12	1.80	12.78	25.23	6.46	40.08	2:11.72	6121	
5	Jennifer Kelly	England	14.43	1.68	13.62	25.43	6.00	38.90	2:21.96	5658	
6	Najuma Fletcher	Guyana	14.11	1.83	9.96	25.08	6.31	34.22	2:27.63	5611	
7	Kim Vanderhoek	Canada	14.08	1.68	13.37	24.74	5.03	45.94	2:32.81	5467	
8	Caroline Kola	Kenya	14.78	1.53	12.84	26.02	5.55	41.50	2:10.47	5407	
9	Emma Lindsay	Scotland	14.96	1.74	9.61	24.61	5.70	34.74	2:18.03	5353	
10	Kendall Matheson	Canada	14.46	1.62	11.12	24.75	NM	35.48	2:23.85	4539	
	Clova Court	England	13.07	1.53	13.36	24.16	DNS	–	–	DNF	
	Lisa Gibbs	Wales	14.18	1.65	11.53	26.52	DNS	–	–	DNF	
	Lillyanne Beining	Papua New Guinea	14.42	1.56	11.99	DNS	–	–	–	DNF	
