= Keith Francis (cricketer) =

Australian cricketer

Personal information
- Born: 14 November 1933 (age 92); Arncliffe, New South Wales, Australia
- Source: ESPNcricinfo, 28 December 2016

Keith Francis (born 14 November 1933) is an Australian cricketer. He played two first-class matches for New South Wales in 1957/58.

== See also ==
- List of New South Wales representative cricketers
