= Kamy Keshmiri =

American discus thrower (born 1969)

Personal information
- Born: January 23, 1969 (age 57)
- Home town: Reno, Nevada, United States

Sport
- Sport: Track and field
Medal record
Representing United States
Summer Universiade
Gold medal – first place	1989 Duisburg	Discus throw

Kamy Keshmiri (born January 23, 1969) is a retired male discus thrower from the United States. He is best known for winning the gold medal in the men's discus throw event at the 1989 Summer Universiade in Duisburg, West Germany. Keshmiri set his personal best (51.28 metres) at the 1988 World Junior Championships in Athletics in Sudbury, Ontario on July 27, 1988. He also won three NCAA discus titles at the University of Nevada at Reno.

His father, Jalal, was born in Iran and represented Iran in the 1968 Olympics.

When he was at Reno High School, he set the National High School Record in the Discus Throw. He was Gatorade High School Track and Field Athlete of the Year and Track and Field News "High School Athlete of the Year" in 1987.

Keshmiri was one of the only American Olympic athletes to have their medal taken away after he was found with illegal steroids in his system.

== Achievements ==
Year	Competition	Venue	Position	Event	Notes
Representing the United States
1988	World Junior Championships	Sudbury, Canada	2nd	Discus	54.68 m
1990	Goodwill Games	Seattle, United States	2nd	Discus	65.50 m

In 1992, the International Amateur Athletic Federation banned Keshmiri after a positive test for methanolone.

Awards
Preceded by Derrick Florence	Track & Field News High School Boys Athlete of the Year; 1987	Succeeded by Art Skipper
