= Brittany Riley =

American hammer thrower

Personal information
- Born: August 26, 1986 (age 39) Flossmoor, Illinois, United States

Sport
- Sport: Track and field
- Event: Hammer throw

Brittany Riley (born August 26, 1986) is a female hammer thrower from the United States. Her personal best throw is 72.51 metres, achieved in April 2007 in Des Moines.

== International competitions ==
Year	Competition	Venue	Position	Notes
Representing the United States
2005	Pan American Junior Championships	Windsor, Canada	2nd	59.72 m
2006	NACAC U-23 Championships	Santo Domingo, Dominican Republic	1st	66.30 m
2007	Pan American Games	Rio de Janeiro, Brazil	5th	65.49 m
2007	World Championships	Osaka, Japan	38th	55.72 m
