= Leo Lermond =

American long-distance runner

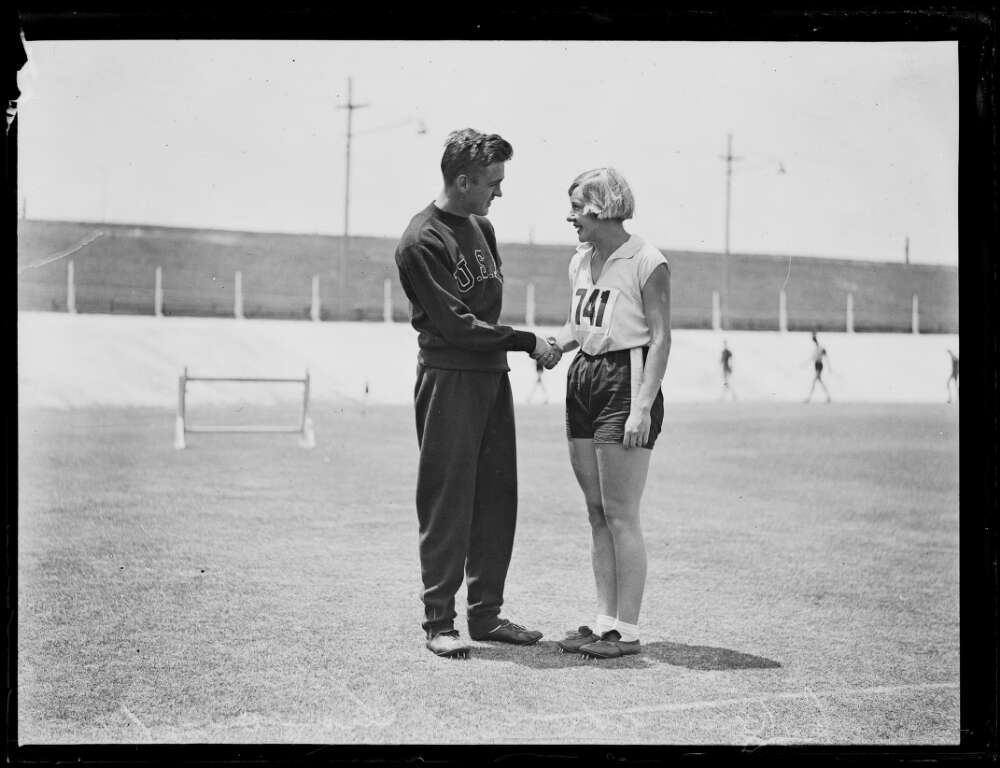
- Leo Lermond shaking hands with Australian athlete Clarice Kennedy, New South Wales, Australia, January 11, 1930

Personal information
- Nationality: American
- Born: April 15, 1906
- Died: July 4, 1986 (aged 80)

Sport
- Sport: Long-distance running
- Event: 5000 metres

Leo Lermond (April 15, 1906 – July 4, 1986) was an American long-distance runner. He competed in the men's 5000 metres at the 1928 Summer Olympics. His brother, George Lermond was also a long-distance runner.
