= Donald Gwinn =

American hammer thrower (1902–1961)

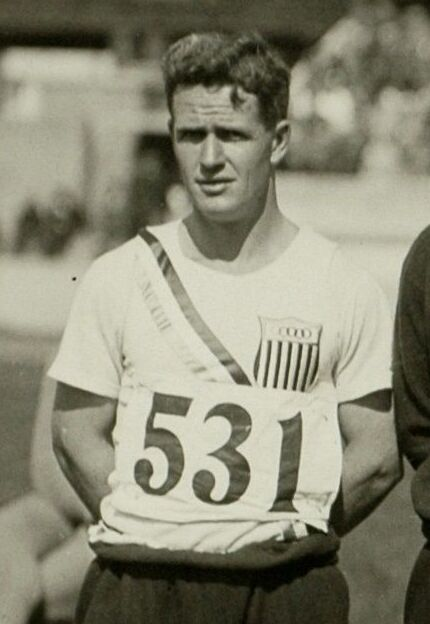
Donald Gwinn in 1928

Donald Smith Gwinn (November 6, 1902 – June 3, 1961) was an American track and field athlete who competed in the 1928 Summer Olympics.

He was born in Woodsfield, Ohio.

Competing for the Pittsburgh Panthers track and field team, Gwinn won the 1927 and 1929 NCAA Track and Field Championships in the hammer throw.

In 1928 he finished fifth in the hammer throw at the Summer Olympics.
