= Najuma Fletcher =

Guyanese athlete

Personal information
- Nationality: Guyanese
- Born: 31 May 1974 (age 52)
- Height: 1.78 m (5 ft 10 in)
- Weight: 59 kg (130 lb)

Sport
- Sport: Athletics
- Events: High jump, Heptathlon

Najuma "Nancy" Fletcher (born 31 May 1974) is a former Guyanese track and field athlete.

As a 16 year old, she placed fourth in the high jump at the 1990 Central American and Caribbean Games. She competed in the women's high jump at the 1992 Summer Olympics. Fletcher finished sixth in the heptathlon at the 1994 Commonwealth Games.

She attended and competed for the University of Pittsburgh. In 2019, she was inducted into the Pitt Athletics Hall of Fame as one of the most decorated athletes in the university's history. From 1992-96, she earned 14 first-team All-America citations and was a six-time Big East champion and was the first woman in Pitt history to win an individual NCAA track and field title when she captured the 1995 indoor triple jump. In 1996, she added the NCAA indoor high jump championship. In academics, she was named the 1996 Big East Scholar-Athlete of the Year.

Her husband, Brett Shields, was a part of the school record-holding sprint hurdle relay team. They have two children. Their daughter, Mikayla Shields, played on the University of South Carolina volleyball team. Her brother, Don Fletcher played basketball for Guyana.
