= Jayden Ulrich =

American athlete (born 2002)

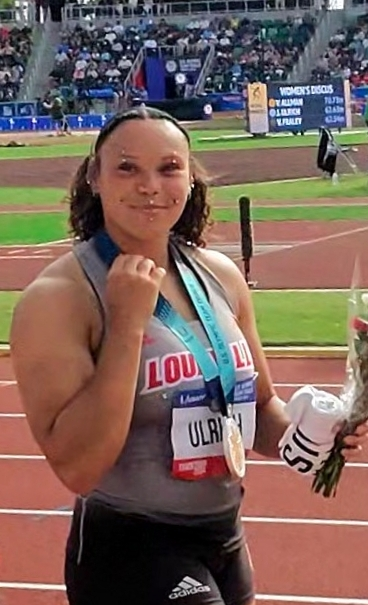
- Ulrich in 2024

Personal information
- Nationality: American
- Born: September 15, 2002 (age 23)
- Home town: East Alton, Illinois, U.S.
- Height: 5 ft 7 in (170 cm)

Sport
- Sport: Athletics
- Events: Discus, Shot Put

Achievements and titles
- Personal bests: Shot Put: 18.66m (Lexington, 2024); Discus: 69.39m (Ramona, 2025)

Jayden Ulrich (born September 15, 2002) is an American discus thrower and shot putter. She finished second in the discus at the American Olympic trials in 2024.

== Early life ==
She attended East Alton-Wood River High School in Illinois, graduating in 2021. She attended the University of Indiana before transferring in 2023 to the University of Louisville.

== Career ==
She set a personal best distance of 64.29m in the discus throw at the Pacific Coast Invitational on April 11 in Long Beach, California.

In May 2024, she set a new personal best in the shot put with a distance of 18.66 metres at the NCAA East Regional Championship in Lexington, Kentucky.

In June 2024, Ulrich finished second in the women's discus with a throw of 63.05 metres, and fourth in the women's shot put with a distance of 17.62m, at the 2024 NCAA Division 1 Championships. She was named the ACC female field athlete of the year in June 2024.

She finished second in the discus throw at the 2024 United States Olympic trials in June 2024 in Eugene, Oregon, with a distance of 62.63 metres. She subsequently competed at the 2024 Summer Olympics in Paris.

In May 2025, she broke her own meeting record with 62.89 metres to retain her ACC title.

On 28 March 2026, she placed fourth in the discus throw at the USATF Winter Long Throws National Championship in Arizona with a throw of 62.12 metres. In May, she placed sixth in the 2026 Diamond League meeting in Rabat.
