= Jake Freeman =

American hammer thrower (born 1980)

Personal information
- Nationality: American
- Born: November 5, 1980 (age 45) Cincinnati, Ohio
- Height: 6 ft 5 in (1.96 m)
- Weight: 360 lb (160 kg)

Sport
- Sport: Track and field
- Event: Hammer throw
- College team: Manhattan Jaspers
- Club: New York Athletic Club

Achievements and titles
- Personal best: HT (7.3 kg): 76.86 m (Princeton 2009)
Medal record
Men's athletics
Representing the United States
NACAC Championships
| Gold medal – first place | 2007 San Salvador | Hammer throw |
NACAC Under-25 Championships
| Gold medal – first place | 2002 San Antonio | Hammer throw |
Pan American Junior Championships
| Silver medal – second place | 1999 Tampa | Hammer throw |
Usatf outdoor track and field championships
| Gold medal – first place | 2010 Des Moines | Hammer throw |

Thomas Jacob Freeman (born November 5, 1980) is an American hammer thrower. He competed at the 2009 World Outdoor championships.

A native of East Greenwich, Rhode Island, Freeman attended Bishop Hendricken High School. He was Track and Field News "High School Athlete of the Year" in 2000.

In 2011, Freeman was suspended by the USA Track & Field due a positive test for tetrahydrocannabinol. It was Freeman's second doping violation, having previously tested positive for tetrahydrocannabinol in 2009.
