= 1937 NCAA Track and Field Championships =

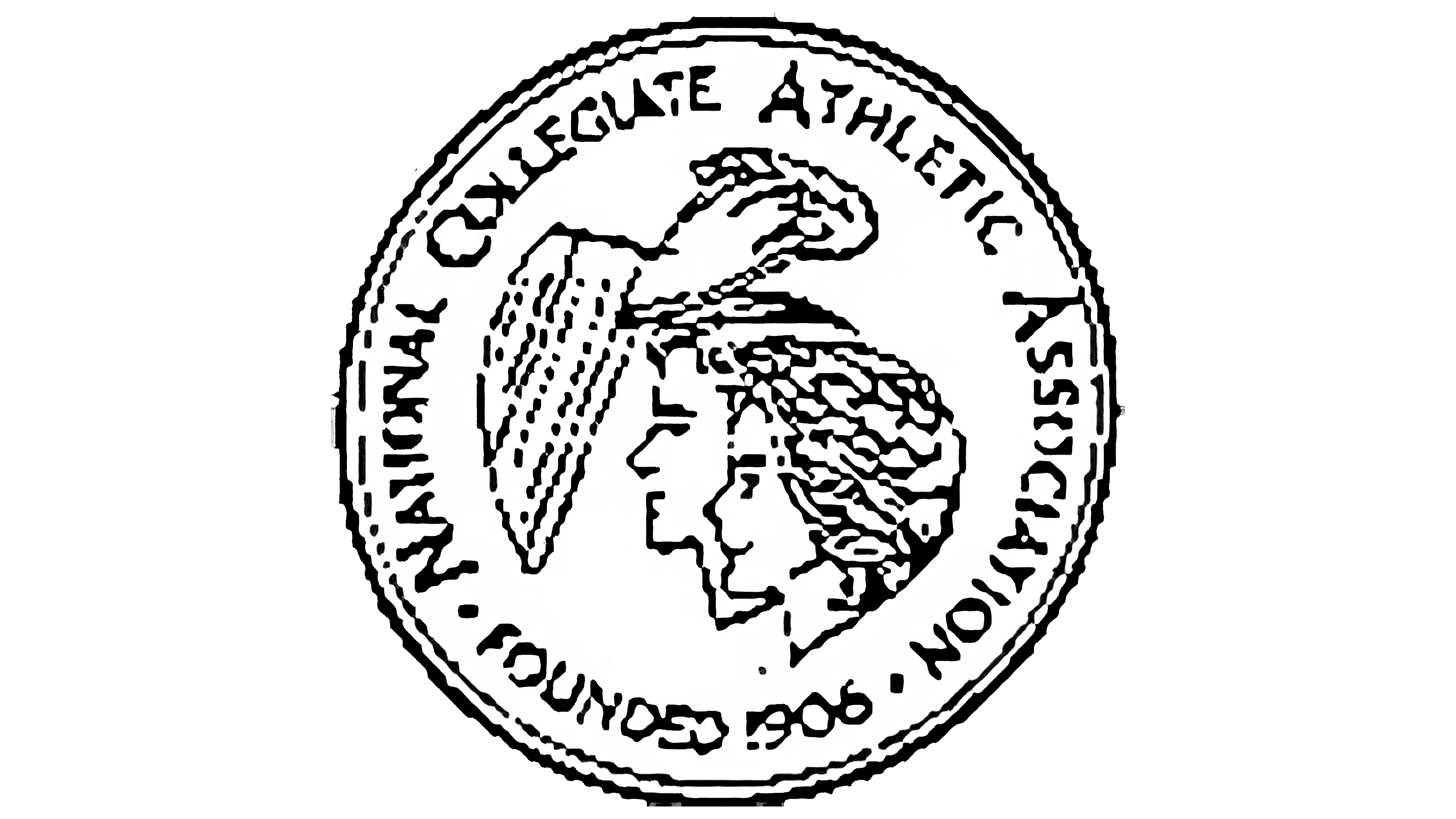
- Team Champion: USC (6th title)
- Edition: 16th
- Dates: June 18-19, 1937
- Host city: Berkeley, CA; University of California, Berkeley
- Venue: Edwards Stadium
- Events: 14

The 1937 NCAA Track and Field Championships was the 16th NCAA track and field championship. The event was held at Berkeley, California on June 18-19, 1937. The University of Southern California won its second consecutive team championship.

== Team scoring ==
1. University of Southern California - 62 points
2. Stanford - 50 points
3. Ohio State - 28
4. Washington State - 24
5. Indiana - 22
6. Columbia - 21
7. Pittsburg State - 17
8. Michigan - 16
9. Notre Dame - 15
10. Wisconsin - 12

== Track events ==
100-yard dash
1. Sam Stoller, Michigan - 9.7 seconds
2. Ben Johnson, Columbia
3. Donald Dunn, Kansas Teachers (Pittsburg)
4. George Boone, USC
5. Bob Grieve, Illinois

120-yard high hurdles
1. Forrest Towns, Georgia - 14.3 seconds
2. Allen Tolmich, Wayne University
3. Roy Staley, USC
4. Verne Sumner, Kansas Teachers (Emporia)
5. Bob Osgood, Michigan

220-yard dash
1. Ben Johnson, Columbia - 21.3 seconds
2. Jack Weiershauser, Stanford
3. Lee Orr, Washington State
4. Curt Ledford, Washington State
5. Fred Elliott, Indiana

220-yard low hurdles
1. Earl Vickery, USC - 23.3 seconds
2. Jack Weiershauser, Stanford
3. Verne Sumner, Kansas Teachers (Emporia)
4. Robert Lemen, Purdue
5. Tom Berkeley, UCLA

440-yard dash
1. Lorin Benke, Washington State - 47.1 seconds
2. Ray Malott, Stanford
3. Harley Howells, Ohio State
4. Charles Belcher, Georgia Tech
5. Richard Gill, Boston College

880-yard run
1. John Woodruff, Pitt - 1:50.3 (NCAA record)
2. Ross Bush, USC
3. Chuck Beetham, USC
4. Vic Palmason, Washington
5. Dick Squire, Ohio State

One-mile run
1. Charles Fenske, Wisconsin - 4:13.9
2. Jim Smith, Indiana
3. Mel Trutt, Indiana
4. Gregory Rice, Notre Dame
5. Dave Rogan, Kentucky

Two-mile run
1. Gregory Rice, Notre Dame - 9:14.2 (NCAA record)
2. Bill Feiler, Drake
3. Richard Frey, Michigan State
4. Thomas Deckard, Indiana
5. Fred Padget, Drake

== Field events ==
Broad jump
1. Kermit King, Kansas Teachers (Pittsburg) - 25 feet, 3-1/4 inches
2. Arnold Nutting, California
3. Eulace Peacock, Temple
4. Bob Hubbard, Minnesota
5. George Boone, USC

High jump
1. Dave Albritton, Ohio State - 6 feet, 6-1/4 inches
2. Gilbert Cruter, Colorado - 6 feet, 6-1/4 inches
3. Delos Thurber, USC - 6 feet, 6-1/4 inches
4. Mel Walker, Ohio State
5. Jack Vickery, Texas
5. Ed Burke, Marquette

Pole vault
1. Bill Sefton, USC - 14 feet, 8-7/8 inches
2. George Varoff, Oregon
3. Earle Meadows, USC
4. Irving Howe, USC
5. Albert Haller, Wisconsin

Discus throw
1. Pete Zagar, Stanford - 156 feet, 3 inches
2. Hugh Gribbin, Stanford
3. Charles Socolofsky, Kansas State
4. Phil Gaspar, USC
5. Donald Johnson, Idaho

Javelin
1. Lowell Todd, San Jose State - 214 feet, 9-3/8 inches
2. Bill Reitz, UCLA
3. Don Johnson, Idaho
4. John Guckeyson, Maryland
5. Chuck Soper, USC

Shot put
1. Sam Francis, Nebraska - 53.50
2. Dimitri Zaitz, Boston College - 52.17
3. Jim Reynolds, Stanford - 51.76
4. William Watson, Michigan - 51.15
5. Dan Taylor, Columbia

== See also ==
- NCAA Men's Outdoor Track and Field Championship
