= Keith Francis (runner) =

American middle-distance runner

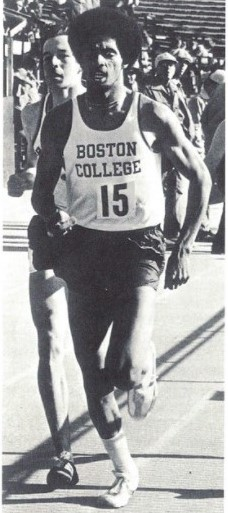
- Francis at 1976 BC Relays (Photo by Jack McDonald)
- Born: December 19, 1954; New Bedford, Massachusetts, U.S.
- Died: July 27, 2011 (aged 56); New Bedford, Massachusetts, U.S.
- Education: Boston College, BA, Lynch School of Education; Boston University, Masters Degree
- Occupations: Intelligence Analyst, ATF
- Known for: World class middle-distance runner
- Children: 3

Keith Francis (December 19, 1954 - July 27, 2011) was an American middle-distance track athlete, US Government professional and Boston College Trustee.

== Early life, education and athletic achievements ==
Francis was born in New Bedford, Massachusetts in 1954. A natural athlete, Francis participated in baseball and basketball at New Bedford High School (1968–1972). He played basketball through his senior year, but decided to concentrate on track beginning his Junior year because he knew that his family could not afford sending him to College, and he felt he could be good enough to get a scholarship. Soon, he was dominating the 880 yard run (Now the 800 meter). As a Senior he won the Massachusetts Class A Eastern Mass, Massachusetts State and the New England Championships at that distance. He broke the state record that year at 1:52.5.

Accepted into Boston College on a track scholarship, he dominated middle-distance races during his tenure. Upon his graduation he was a seven-time All-American and NCAA Champion with eight school records, five of which he still held at the time of his death in 2011 (800 meter outdoor and indoor, 4 X 800 meter relay and sprint medley relay, and the 1,000 meter).

Outside of the NCAA, he was invited to compete in the 1974 and 1975 US National Track and Field Championships and the 1975 Pan American Games in Mexico City. His National and World rankings gave him the opportunity to participate in many international meets during that time. After his senior year at BC, Francis was invited to the 1976 Olympic trials for the 800M. He progressed through the preliminary heats and made it to the final, finishing 8th.

ESPN's Track & Field analyst Larry Rawson declared Keith Francis Track Career as "the greatest Boston College has ever seen" He is on the "BC All-Time Greatest Athletes" list.

Meet	City	Event	Place	Time	Notes
1974 NCAA Div 1 Indoor Track & Field Championships	Detroit, Michigan	1,000 yd	2nd	2:08.40	NCAA All-American
1974 NCAA Div 1 Outdoor Track & Field Championships	Austin, Texas	880 yd	2nd	1:49.00	NCAA All-American
1974 US National Track & Field Championships	Westwood, California	800 yd	5th	1:46.20	
1975 NCAA Div 1 Indoor Track & Field Championships	Detroit, Michigan	1,000 yd	1st	2:08.40	NCAA All-American, National Champion
1975 NCAA Div 1 Outdoor Track & Field Championships	Provo, Utah	880 yd	4th	1:48.43	NCAA All-American
1975 US National Track & Field Championships	Eugene, Oregon	800 M	4th	1:46.18	
1975 Pan Am Games	Mexico City	800 M	7th	1:49.30	
1976 NCAA Div 1 Indoor Track & Field Championships	Detroit, Michigan	1,000 yd	2nd	2:07.68	NCAA All-American
1976 Olympic Trials	Eugene, Oregon	800 M	8th	1:48.07	

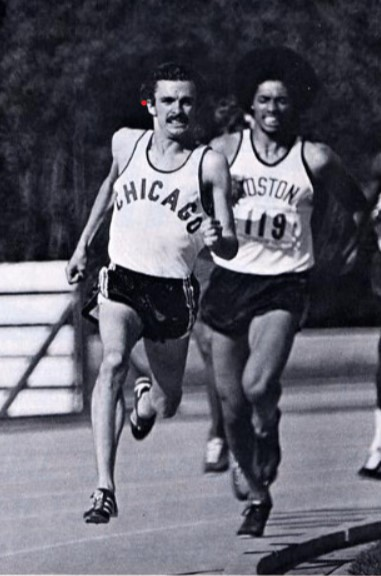
Keith Francis at the 800 M final: 1976 Olympic Trials

Boston College School Records

Outdoor Records	Time	Indoor Records	Time
800 M	1:46.18	800 M	1:50.2
Mile	4:00.8	1,000 M	2:22.4
4 X 800 M Relay (Vercallone, Lowell, Goggin, Francis)	7:29.2	4 X 400 M Relay (Collins, Trovato, Fitzmaurice, Francis)	3:18.0
Sprint Medley Relay (Trovato, Green, Hazzard, Francis)	3:19.5	4 X 800 M Relay (Vercallone, Lowell, Goggin, Francis)	7:28.3

== Career after Boston College and death ==
After Graduating in 1976 with a BA from the Boston College Lynch School of Education, Francis went on to earn a master's degree at Boston University.

He returned to New Bedford as a Guidance counsellor for a short time and then relocated to Maryland, where he remained for 30 years, first as a probation officer at the Superior Court in DC, and then a career working for the US Government, first with the Drug Enforcement Agency, and then a long tenure at the Bureau of Alcohol, Tobacco and Firearms, retiring as a Senior Intelligence Analyst.

After retirement he returned to New Bedford. In 2009 he was invited to join the board of trustees at Boston College, and served from 2010 to 2011.

Francis died of cancer on July 27, 2011, in his home town of New Bedford, at the age of 56.

== Legacy ==
In 2008 Francis co-organized "Reconnect" at Boston College, the first AHANA (African, Hispanic/Latino, Asian and Native American alumni) reunion. He remained active in the organization until his death.

He was a member of the Boston College Board of Trustees 2010–2011.

The Keith Francis Memorial Scholarship was established in 2013. Multiple scholarships are awarded to local college-bound graduates from New Bedford who embody "Community service, Education and Achievement".

== Awards and honors ==
- 1972: Southeastern Massachusetts District Board of Basketball Officials, "Large school Most Valuable Player"
- 1972: Massachusetts State Champion and New England Champion 880 Yd
- 1974–1976: NCAA All-American (seven times), NCAA National Champion, 1000M (1975)
- 1981: Hall of Fame Inductee, BC Varsity Club Athletic Hall of Fame
- 2007: Hall of Fame Inductee, Massachusetts State Coaches Association
- 2012: Boston College renamed AHANA weekend the "Keith A. Francis Discovery Weekend".
- 2013: New Bedford Track at the Andrea McCoy Recreation center was renamed "Keith Francis Memorial Track"
- 2021: BC's 25 All-Time Greatest Athletes, Boston College Magazine
- 2024: Boston College renamed the summer enrichment program "Options for Education Program" (OEP) the "McCrory-Francis Scholars Program", to honor the important role played by two prominent men of color in advancing diversity in the student body.
