= Candice Scott =

Track and field athlete and hammer thrower

Personal information
- Nationality: Trinidad and Tobago
- Born: Candice Henrietta Scott; September 17, 1980 (age 45) Trinidad and Tobago
- Height: 5 ft 11 in (1.80 m)
- Weight: 220 lb (100 kg)

Sport
- Sport: Track and field
- Event: Hammer throw
- College team: University of Florida
Medal record
Representing Trinidad and Tobago
Women's Athletics
CAC Junior Championships (U20)
Silver medal – second place	1998 George Town	Shot put
CARIFTA Games Junior (U20)
Gold medal – first place	1999 Fort-de-France	Shot put
Gold medal – first place	1998 Port of Spain	Shot put
Silver medal – second place	1999 Fort-de-France	Discus throw

Candice Henrietta Scott (born 17 September 1980) is a track and field athlete who is a hammer throw specialist from Trinidad and Tobago.

Her personal best throw is 71.45 metres, achieved in May 2005 in Marietta, Georgia.

She attended the University of Florida in Gainesville, Florida, where she was a member of the Florida Gators track and field team. She graduated from the university with a bachelor's degree in recreation in 2005.

== Achievements ==
Year	Competition	Venue	Position	Event	Notes
Representing Trinidad and Tobago
1998	CARIFTA Games (U20)	Port of Spain, Trinidad and Tobago	1st	Shot put	13.17 m
1998	Central American and Caribbean Junior Championships (U20)	Georgetown, Cayman Islands	2nd	Shot put	12.78 m
1999	CARIFTA Games (U20)	Fort-de-France, Martinique	1st	Shot put	14.09 m
1999	CARIFTA Games (U20)	Fort-de-France, Martinique	2nd	Discus throw	34.50 m
1999	Pan American Junior Championships	Tampa, United States	2nd	Shot put	14.16 m
2002	Commonwealth Games	Manchester, United Kingdom	8th	Shot put	15.33 m
2002	Commonwealth Games	Manchester, United Kingdom	5th	Hammer throw	60.93 m
2003	World Championships	Paris, France	9th	Hammer throw	67.73 m
2003	Pan American Games	Santo Domingo, Dom. Rep.	3rd	Hammer throw	69.06 m
2004	Olympic Games	Athens, Greece	9th	Hammer throw	69.94 m (=NR)
2005	Central American and Caribbean Championships	Nassau, Bahamas	5th	Shot put	16.43 m
2005	Central American and Caribbean Championships	Nassau, Bahamas	1st	Hammer throw	67.44 m
2005	World Championships	Helsinki, Finland	8th	Hammer throw	66.55 m
2007	NACAC Championships	San Salvador, El Salvador	2nd	Hammer throw	60.52 m
2007	Pan American Games	Rio de Janeiro, Brazil	9th	Hammer throw	62.21 m
2008	Central American and Caribbean Championships	Cali, Colombia	1st	Hammer throw	69.26 m
2008	Olympic Games	Beijing, PR China	40th (q)	Hammer throw	63.03 m

== See also ==
- Florida Gators
- List of University of Florida alumni
- List of University of Florida Olympians
