= Scott Neilson (hammer thrower) =

Canadian hammer thrower

Personal information
- Born: 31 January 1957 (age 69) British Columbia, Canada

Sport
- Sport: Track and field
Medal record
Representing Canada
Pan American Games
Gold medal – first place	1979 San Juan	Hammer throw
Bronze medal – third place	1975 Mexico City	Hammer throw
Commonwealth Games
Silver medal – second place	1978 Edmonton	Hammer throw

Scott Neilson (born 31 January 1957) is a Canadian former track and field athlete who competed in the hammer throw. His personal best was 72.72 m (238 ft 6 3/4 in), set in Seattle on 1 April 1978.

His greatest achievement was a gold medal at the 1979 Pan American Games. He was also a silver medallist at the Commonwealth Games in 1978 and was a seven-time NCAA champion while at the University of Washington.

== Career ==
He attended the University of Washington and competed for their Washington Huskies collegiate team. While there, he won four straight titles at the NCAA Men's Division I Outdoor Track and Field Championships from 1976 to 1979, including a championship record of 72.36 m (237 ft 4 3/4 in). He also won three straight weight throw titles at the NCAA Indoor Championships in the same period. This made him the most successful athlete ever in the NCAA events. He also won four Pacific Coast Conference titles in hammer.

He won four titles at the Canadian Track and Field Championships from 1976 to 1980, including a championship record of 71.76 m (235 ft 5 in) which remains unbeaten. At the 1979 USA Outdoor Track and Field Championships he won the event with a championship record throw of 72.06 m (236 ft 5 in).

His first international medal came at the age of eighteen at the 1975 Pan American Games. He was the first Canadian to win a hammer throw medal at that competition. Three years later at the 1978 Commonwealth Games, held in Edmonton, Alberta, Canada, he became the first Canadian hammer medallist since George Sutherlandin 1934 by taking a silver medal behind Australia's Peter Farmer. The 1979 Pan American Games saw him become his nation's first winner in the event, with a winning throw of 69.64 m (228 ft 5 1/2 in). Only shot putter Bruce Pirnie had won a Pan American gold among Canadian throwers.

The last major result of his international career came at the age of twenty three at the Liberty Bell Classic, organised due to the 1980 Summer Olympics boycott that year. He defeated American Boris Djerassi at the alternative event with a mark of 72.62 m (238 ft 3 in) – one of the best of his career. Despite this strong form, he was some way behind the form shown by the Soviets at the 1980 Moscow Olympics, where Yuriy Sedykh set a new world record of 81.80 m (268 ft 4 1/4 in). Neilson also competed at the IAAF World Cup event, representing North America, and came fifth in 1977 and fourth in 1981.

In 2025 Neilson was inducted into the track and field Collegiate Athlete Hall of Fame.

== International competitions ==
Year	Competition	Venue	Position	Notes
1975	Pan American Games	Mexico City, Mexico	3rd	64.56 m
1977	World Cup	Düsseldorf, West Germany	5th	67.18 m
1978	Commonwealth Games	Edmonton, Alberta, Canada	2nd	69.92 m
1979	Pan American Games	San Juan, Puerto Rico	1st	69.64 m
1980	Liberty Bell Classic	Philadelphia, United States	1st	72.62 m
1981	World Cup	Rome, Italy	4th	67.56 m

== National titles ==
- USA Outdoor Track and Field Championships
  - Hammer throw: 1979
- Canadian Track and Field Championships
  - Hammer throw: 1976, 1978, 1979, 1980
- NCAA Men's Division I Outdoor Track and Field Championships
  - Hammer throw: 1976, 1977, 1978, 1979
- NCAA Men's Division I Indoor Track and Field Championships
  - Weight throw: 1977, 1978, 1979
