= Kenneth Ikeji =

British athlete (born 2002)

Kenny Ikeji
Personal information
- Nationality: British
- Born: 28 October 2002 (age 23)

Sport
- Sport: Athletics
- Event: Hammer
- Club: Basildon AC

Achievements and titles
- Personal best(s): Hammer: 77.92 m (Austin, 2023)

Kenneth Ikeji (born 28 October 2002) is a British track and field athlete who competes in the hammer throw and is the UK record holder in the Weight throw.

== Early life ==
Ikeji grew up in Dagenham. He won the 2017 English Schools title in the hammer in Birmingham. He attended Brampton Manor Academy in London. before attending Harvard University in the United States in 2021 to study computer science.

== Career ==
Ikelj won the hammer throw 2023 NCAA Division I Outdoor Track and Field Championships with a 77.92m throw. This placed him third on the UK’s all-time rankings, breaking his personal best numerous times during the competition. He also set a new facility record, and Ivy League record, with the 77.92m distance.

He was selected as part of the Great Britain team for the 2023 European Athletics U23 Championships held from in July 2023 in Espoo, Finland. He was one of a few athletes controversially left out of the British squad for the 2023 World Championships, despite having been eligible to be selected by ranking.

In February 2024, he set a new UK national record in the Weight throw, recording a distance of 24.39 whilst competing at the 2024 Ivy League Heptagonal Indoor Track & Field Championships. The following month he won the Weight competition with 24.32m at the NCAA Indoor Championships in Boston, Massachusetts. In November 2024, he was named by British Athletics on the Olympic Futures Programme for 2025.

He threw 75.20 metres to win the hammer throw at the Mt. SAC Relays in California on 19 April 2025.
