= Jacques Accambray =

French track and field athlete (born 1950)

Personal information
- Born: 23 May 1950
- Height: 1.94 m (6 ft 4 1/2 in)
- Weight: 125 kg (276 lb)

Sport
- Sport: Athletics
- Events: Hammer throw Weight throw
- Partner: Isabelle Accambray

Achievements and titles
- Personal best: Hammer throw: 73.46 m (1976)
Medal record
Representing France
Mediterranean Games
Bronze medal – third place	1975 Algiers	Hammer throw

Jacques Accambray (born 23 May 1950) is a French former track and field athlete.

A talented age group thrower, Accambray set a world junior record in men's hammer throw in 1969. During the early 1970s he studied at Kent State University in Ohio, winning NCAA championship titles in both hammer throw and weight throw. He represented France as a hammer thrower at the 1972 and 1976 Summer Olympics, as well as at the European Championships of 1969, 1971, 1974 and 1978. From 1985 to 1996 he was President of the French American Football Federation.

== Biography ==
Accambray was born in Divion, Pas-de-Calais on 23 May 1950. He developed rapidly as a hammer thrower; in June 1968 he threw 64.40 m in a dual meet against West Germany, setting a new French junior record. On 31 May 1969 he threw 68.24 m in Sochaux, breaking the world junior mark; the throw placed him 21st in the world that year among throwers of any age. Accambray was selected to represent France at the 1969 European Athletics Championships in Athens, but only managed 60.76 m and was eliminated in the qualification round. He won his first French national championship title that summer, repeating as champion the following year.

For the next four years Accambray studied at Kent State University in Ohio, continuing his throwing career there. Accambray and his Kent State teammate Al Schoterman were the top collegiate heavy throwers of the early 1970s; in 1971, Accambray placed second to Schoterman in the 35 lb weight throw at the Division I indoor championships and won the hammer throw, with Schoterman taking second, in the outdoor meet; Accambray's winning mark of 227 ft 10 in (69.44 m) was a new collegiate and meeting record.

Accambray and Schoterman reversed roles in 1972, with Accambray winning the NCAA weight throw title and Schoterman the hammer throw; again, they claimed the top two in both events. Accambray's winning mark in the weight throw, 71 ft 3 in (21.71 m), broke Schoterman's meeting record from the previous year. At the 1972 Summer Olympics in Munich Accambray cleared the qualification with a throw of 68.00 m, but in the final he only managed 65.06 m and placed 19th. With Schoterman no longer in college, Accambray regained the NCAA hammer title in 1973.

Accambray won his second collegiate indoor weight throw title in 1974, throwing 71 ft 10 3/4 in (21.91 m); the mark was a new collegiate and meeting record, and remained Kent State record until Matthias Tayala broke it in 2014. Accambray also won the 1974 United States weight throw championship, defeating four-time defending champion George Frenn. In his final year at Kent State, he joined the university's American football team as a defensive tackle; after his graduation in 1974 he was signed by the Montreal Alouettes of the Canadian Football League, but although he visited the Alouettes' training and selection camp he never played a game for them.

Accambray became French hammer throw champion for a third time in 1975, throwing a meeting record 69.76 m. He won bronze with 65.16 m at the 1975 Mediterranean Games. Accambray achieved his best results in 1976, winning his fourth French title with 69.86 m; at the 1976 Summer Olympics in Montreal he threw 70.44 m for ninth place, his best placing in a major international meet. He set his final personal best (and French record), 73.46 m, in Antony on 23 June 1976. At the 1978 European Championships in Prague Accambray was again eliminated in the qualification round. He won his fifth and final French national title in 1979.

From 1985 to 1996 he was President of the Fédération Française de Football Américain (FFFA), France's national federation of American football.

== Personal life ==
Accambray's wife, Isabelle Accambray (née Reynaud), was French national champion in women's discus throw from 1980 to 1982. Handball international William Accambray is their son.
