= Discus throw at the NCAA Division I Outdoor Track and Field Championships =

This is a list of the NCAA outdoor champions in the discus throw. Measurement was conducted in imperial distances (feet and inches) until 1975. Metrication occurred in 1976, so all subsequent championships were measured in metric distances. The women's event started in 1982.

== Winners ==
Key
A=Altitude assisted

Women's discus throw winners
Year	Athlete	Team	Distance
1982	Meg Ritchie (GBR)	Arizona Wildcats	61.56 m (201 ft 11 in)
1983	Leslie Deniz	Arizona State Sun Devils	63.96 m (209 ft 10 in)
1984	Carol Cady	Stanford Cardinal	60.48 m (198 ft 5 in)
1985	Laura DeSnoo	San Diego State Aztecs	58.06 m (190 ft 5 in)
1986	Toni Lutjens	UCLA Bruins	55.82 m (183 ft 1 in)
1987	Laura Lavine	Washington State Cougars	56.14 m (184 ft 2 in)
1988	Laura Lavine	Washington State Cougars	57.34 m (188 ft 1 in)
1989	Carla Garrett	Arizona Wildcats	58.02 m (190 ft 4 in)
1990	Tracie Millett	UCLA Bruins	56.00 m (183 ft 8 in)
1991	Anna Mosdell (CAN)	BYU Cougars	56.04 m (183 ft 10 in)
1992	Anna Mosdell (CAN)	BYU Cougars	54.78 m (179 ft 8 in)
1993	Danyel Mitchell	LSU Lady Tigers	56.86 m (186 ft 6 in)
1994	Danyel Mitchell	LSU Lady Tigers	59.08 m (193 ft 9 in)
1995	Dawn Dumble	UCLA Bruins	57.04 m (187 ft 1 in)
1996	Anna Söderberg (SWE)	Northern Arizona Lumberjacks	59.52 m (195 ft 3 in)
1997	Seilala Sua	UCLA Bruins	61.12 m (200 ft 6 in)
1998	Seilala Sua	UCLA Bruins	64.22 m (210 ft 8 in)
1999	Seilala Sua	UCLA Bruins	64.26 m (210 ft 9 in)
2000	Seilala Sua	UCLA Bruins	61.20 m (200 ft 9 in)
2001	Katja Schreiber (GER)	Idaho Vandals	60.32 m (197 ft 10 in)
2002	Chaniqua Ross	UCLA Bruins	55.48 m (182 ft 0 in)
2003	Deshaya Williams	Penn State Nittany Lions	55.40 m (181 ft 9 in)
2004	Becky Breisch	Nebraska Cornhuskers	62.31 m (204 ft 5 in)
2005	Beth Mallory	Alabama Crimson Tide	59.35 m (194 ft 8 in)
2006	Dace Ruskule (LAT)	Nebraska Cornhuskers	55.13 m (180 ft 10 in)
2007	Kelechi Anyanwu	California Golden Bears	57.58 m (188 ft 10 in)
2008	Sarah Stevens	Arizona State Sun Devils	184 ft 2 in (56.13 m)
2009	D'Andra Carter	Texas Tech Red Raiders	55.62 m (182 ft 5 in)
2010	Jeneva McCall	Southern Illinois Salukis	54.98 m (180 ft 4 in)
2011	Trecey Rew	Northwestern Wildcats	58.64 m (192 ft 4 in)
2012	Whitney Ashley	San Diego State Aztecs	59.99 m (196 ft 9 in)
2013	Anna Jelmini	Arizona State Sun Devils	57.95 m (190 ft 1 in)
2014	Shelbi Vaughan	Texas A&M Aggies	60.02 m (196 ft 10 in)
2015	Shelbi Vaughan	Texas A&M Aggies	61.39 m (201 ft 4 in)
2016	Kelsey Card	Wisconsin Badgers	63.52 m (208 ft 4 in)
2017	Shadae Lawrence (JAM)	Kansas State Wildcats	61.37 m (201 ft 4 in)
2018	Maggie Ewen	Arizona State Sun Devils	60.48 m (198 ft 5 in)
2019	Laulauga Tausaga	Iowa Hawkeyes	63.26 m (207 ft 6 in)
2021	Jorinde Van Klinken (NED)	Arizona State Sun Devils	65.01 m (213 ft 3 in)
2022	Jorinde Van Klinken (NED)	Arizona State Sun Devils	62.16 m (203 ft 11 in)
2023	Jorinde Van Klinken (NED)	Oregon Ducks	63.97 m (209 ft 10 in)
2024	Veronica Fraley	Vanderbilt Commodores	63.66 m (208 ft 10 in)
2025	Cierra Jackson	Fresno State Bulldogs	65.82 m (215 ft 11 in)
2026	Alida van Daalen (NED)	Florida Gators	65.98 m (216 ft 5 in)

Men's discus throw winners
Year	Athlete	Team	Distance
1921	Gus Pope	Washington Huskies	43.34 m (142 ft 2 in)
1922	Thomas Lieb	Notre Dame Fighting Irish	43.95 m (144 ft 2 in)
1923	Thomas Lieb	Notre Dame Fighting Irish	43.69 m (143 ft 4 in)
1924	not held		
1925	Clifford Hoffman	Stanford Cardinal	45.21 m (148 ft 3 in)
1926	Clarence "Bud" Houser	USC Trojans	45.21 m (148 ft 3 in)
1927	James Corson	Pacific Tigers	43.95 m (144 ft 2 in)
1928	Eric Krenz	Stanford Cardinal	45.47 m (149 ft 2 in)
1929	Peter Rasmus	Ohio State Buckeyes	48.51 m (159 ft 1 in)
1930	Paul Jessup	Washington Huskies	49.01 m (160 ft 9 in)
1931	Robert Hall	USC Trojans	46.52 m (152 ft 7 in)
1932	Frank Purma	Illinois Fighting Illini	47.68 m (156 ft 5 in)
1933	Henri LaBorde	Stanford Cardinal	49.78 m (163 ft 3 in)
1934	Gordon Dunn	Stanford Cardinal	49.56 m (162 ft 7 in)
1935	Ken Carpenter	USC Trojans	48.14 m (157 ft 11 in)
1936	Ken Carpenter	USC Trojans	52.73 m (172 ft 11 in)
1937	Pete Zagar	Stanford Cardinal	47.62 m (156 ft 2 in)
1938	Pete Zagar	Stanford Cardinal	49.46 m (162 ft 3 in)
1939	Pete Zagar	Stanford Cardinal	49.99 m (164 ft 0 in)
1940	Archie Harris	Indiana Hoosiers	49.49 m (162 ft 4 in)
1941	Archie Harris	Indiana Hoosiers	53.26 m (174 ft 8 in)
1942	Bob Fitch	Minnesota Golden Gophers	50.2 m (164 ft 8 in)
1943	Howard Debus	Nebraska Cornhuskers	44.01 m (144 ft 4 in)
1944	Wilfred Bangert	Missouri Tigers	45.54 m (149 ft 4 in)
1945	Wilfred Bangert	Missouri Tigers	46.26 m (151 ft 9 in)
1946	Fortune Gordien	Minnesota Golden Gophers	46.91 m (153 ft 10 in)
1947	Fortune Gordien	Minnesota Golden Gophers	52.81 m (173 ft 3 in)A
1948	Fortune Gordien	Minnesota Golden Gophers	50.00 m (164 ft 0 in)
1949	Victor Frank	Yale Bulldogs	51.45 m (168 ft 9 in)
1950	Dick Doyle	Montana Grizzlies	52.25 m (171 ft 5 in)
1951	Jim Dillion	Auburn Tigers	51.05 m (167 ft 5 in)
1952	Sim Iness	USC Trojans	52.79 m (173 ft 2 in)
1953	Sim Iness	USC Trojans	57.93 m (190 ft 0 in)
1954	Jim Dillion	Auburn Tigers	53.72 m (176 ft 2 in)
1955	Des Koch	USC Trojans	53.65 m (176 ft 0 in)
1956	Ron Drummond	UCLA Bruins	52.74 m (173 ft 0 in)
1957	Al Oerter	Kansas Jayhawks	56.49 m (185 ft 4 in)
1958	Rink Babka	USC Trojans	56.74 m (186 ft 1 in)
1958	Al Oerter	Kansas Jayhawks	56.74 m (186 ft 1 in)
1959	Dick Cochran	Missouri Tigers	54.25 m (177 ft 11 in)
1960	Dick Cochran	Missouri Tigers	57.39 m (188 ft 3 in)
1961	Glen Passey	Utah State Aggies	53.85 m (176 ft 8 in)
1962	Dave Weill	Stanford Cardinal	57.33 m (188 ft 1 in)
1963	Dave Weill	Stanford Cardinal	55.23 m (181 ft 2 in)A
1964	Larry Kennedy	New Mexico Lobos	56.45 m (185 ft 2 in)
1965	Bob Stoecker	Stanford Cardinal	55.97 m (183 ft 7 in)
1966	Randy Matson	Texas A&M Aggies	60.05 m (197 ft 0 in)
1967	Randy Matson	Texas A&M Aggies	58.01 m (190 ft 3 in)A
1968	John van Reenen (RSA)	Washington State Cougars	59.39 m (194 ft 10 in)
1969	John van Reenen (RSA)	Washington State Cougars	61.16 m (200 ft 7 in)
1970	John van Reenen (RSA)	Washington State Cougars	58.14 m (190 ft 8 in)
1971	Mike Louisiana	BYU Cougars	59.39 m (194 ft 10 in)
1972	Fred DeBernardi	UTEP Miners	59.87 m (196 ft 5 in)
1973	Mac Wilkins	Oregon Ducks	62.15 m (203 ft 10 in)
1974	Zdravko Pecar (YUG)	BYU Cougars	57.96 m (190 ft 1 in)
1975	Jim McGoldrick	Texas Longhorns	57.94 m (190 ft 1 in)A
1976	Borys Chambul (CAN)	Washington Huskies	61.65 m (202 ft 3 in)
1977	Svein Inge Valvik (NOR)	UTEP Miners	60.62 m (198 ft 10 in)
1978	Kenth Gardenkrans (SWE)	BYU Cougars	64.00 m (209 ft 11 in)
1979	Brad Cooper (BAH)	Florida State Seminoles	63.94 m (209 ft 9 in)
1980	Göran Svensson (SWE)	BYU Cougars	61.72 m (202 ft 5 in)
1981	Scott Crowell	Iowa State Cyclones	62.88 m (206 ft 3 in)
1982	Dean Crouser	Oregon Ducks	63.22 m (207 ft 4 in)A
1983	Dean Crouser	Oregon Ducks	65.88 m (216 ft 1 in)
1984	John Brenner	UCLA Bruins	63.42 m (208 ft 0 in)
1985	Rick Meyer	Houston Cougars	62.94 m (206 ft 5 in)
1986	Olav Jenssen (NOR)	UTEP Miners	60.4 m (198 ft 1 in)
1987	Clifford Felkins	Abilene Christian Wildcats	61.00 m (200 ft 1 in)
1988	Kari Nisula (FIN)	California Golden Bears	58.08 m (190 ft 6 in)
1989	John Nichols	LSU Tigers	63.42 m (208 ft 0 in)A
1990	Kamy Keshmiri	Nevada Wolf Pack	63.12 m (207 ft 1 in)
1991	Kamy Keshmiri	Nevada Wolf Pack	66.58 m (218 ft 5 in)
1992	Kamy Keshmiri	Nevada Wolf Pack	67.06 m (220 ft 0 in)
1993	Brian Milne	Penn State Nittany Lions	61.08 m (200 ft 4 in)
1994	John Godina	UCLA Bruins	60.48 m (198 ft 5 in)
1995	John Godina	UCLA Bruins	61.68 m (202 ft 4 in)
1996	Andy Bloom	Wake Forest Demon Deacons	64.34 m (211 ft 1 in)
1997	Jason Tunks (CAN)	SMU Mustangs	59.72 m (195 ft 11 in)
1998	Casey Malone	Colorado State Rams	61.02 m (200 ft 2 in)
1999	Gábor Máté (HUN)	Auburn Tigers	61.6 m (202 ft 1 in)
2000	Gábor Máté (HUN)	Auburn Tigers	65.74 m (215 ft 8 in)
2001	Tolga Köseoglu (GER)	Texas A&M Aggies	62.43 m (204 ft 9 in)
2002	Janus Robberts (RSA)	SMU Mustangs	62.37 m (204 ft 7 in)
2003	Hannes Hopley (RSA)	SMU Mustangs	61.25 m (200 ft 11 in)
2004	Hannes Hopley (RSA)	SMU Mustangs	62.01 m (203 ft 5 in)
2005	Michael Robertson	Stanford Cardinal	61.7 m (202 ft 5 in)
2006	Vikas Gowda (IND)	North Carolina Tar Heels	60.55 m (198 ft 7 in)
2007	Niklas Arrhenius (SWE)	BYU Cougars	62.84 m (206 ft 2 in)
2008	Rashaud Scott	Kentucky Wildcats	60.87 m (199 ft 8 in)
2009	Martin Maric (CRO)	California Golden Bears	59.82 m (196 ft 3 in)
2010	Ryan Whiting	Arizona State Sun Devils	59.06 m (193 ft 9 in)
2011	Julian Wruck (AUS)	Texas Tech Red Raiders	61.81 m (202 ft 9 in)
2012	Chad Wright (JAM)	Nebraska Cornhuskers	62.79 m (206 ft 0 in)
2013	Julian Wruck (AUS)	UCLA Bruins	64.94 m (213 ft 0 in)
2014	Hayden Reed	Alabama Crimson Tide	62.74 m (205 ft 10 in)
2015	Sam Mattis	Penn Quakers	62.48 m (204 ft 11 in)
2017	Filip Mihaljevic (CRO)	Virginia Cavaliers	63.76 m (209 ft 2 in)
2018	Luke Vaughn	Memphis Tigers	60.41 m (198 ft 2 in)
2019	Eric "Duke" Kicinski	Texas Tech Red Raiders	62.53 m (205 ft 1 in)
2021	Turner Washington	Arizona State Sun Devils	63.42 m (208 ft 0 in)
2022	Claudio Romero (CHI)	Virginia Cavaliers	66.17 m (217 ft 1 in)
2023	Turner Washington	Arizona State Sun Devils	66.22 m (217 ft 3 in)
2024	Francois Prinsloo (ZAF)	South Alabama Jaguars	63.51 m (208 ft 4 in)
2025	Ralford Mullings (JAM)	Oklahoma Sooners	69.31 m (227 ft 4 in)
2026	Ralford Mullings (JAM)	Oklahoma Sooners	65.81 m (215 ft 10 in)
