= Al Schoterman =

American hammer thrower (born 1950)

Personal information
- Born: September 11, 1950 (age 75) Albany, New York, United States

Sport
- Sport: Athletics
- Event: Hammer throw

Al Schoterman (born September 11, 1950) is an American athlete. He competed in the men's hammer throw at the 1972 Summer Olympics.

Schoterman was an NCAA champion thrower for the Kent State Golden Flashes track and field team, winning the weight throw at the 1971 NCAA Indoor Track and Field Championships and the hammer throw at the 1972 NCAA University Division Outdoor Track and Field Championships.

In 1983 Schoterman won the Weight Throw in a Masters meet in Ohio. In 1984 Schoterman set a "M30 Sub-Masters World Indoor Record" in the Weight Throw at 70'-6 1/2".

In 1984 Schoterman was coaching Olympian Jud Logan.
