= 60 meter hurdles at the NCAA Division I Indoor Track and Field Championships =

The 60 meter hurdles, 55 meter hurdles, or their imperial 60 yard hurdles equivalent, often called the "high hurdles", has been contested at the NCAA Division I Indoor Track and Field Championships since its founding in 1965. The 60 yard hurdles was contested until 1983, 55 meters from 1984 to 1998, and the 60 meters has been run since 1999. Hand timing was used until 1975, while starting in 1976 fully automatic timing was used.

== Winners ==
Key
y=yards
*=55 meter hurdles distance
A=Altitude assisted

Women's 60 m hurdles / 55 m hurdles / 60 yd hurdles winners
Year	Athlete	Team	Time
1983	Candy Young	Fairleigh Dickinson Knights	7.49 y
1984	Candy Young	Fairleigh Dickinson Knights	7.73 *
1985	Rhonda Blanford	Nebraska Cornhuskers	7.57 *
1986	Rosalind Pendergraft	Auburn Tigers	7.53 *
1987	Lavonna Martin	Tennessee Volunteers	7.57 *
1988	Lavonna Martin	Tennessee Volunteers	7.56 *
1989	Tananjalyn Stanley	LSU Lady Tigers	7.47 *
1990	Lynda Tolbert	Arizona State Sun Devils	7.44 *
1991	Mary Cobb	LSU Lady Tigers	7.61 *
1992	Gillian Russell	Miami Hurricanes	7.59 *
1993	Monifa Taylor	Florida Gators	7.53 *
1994	Dionne Rose	Florida Gators	7.60 *
1995	Gillian Russell	Miami Hurricanes	7.49 *
1996	Kim Carson	LSU Lady Tigers	7.44 *
1997	Tiffany Lott	BYU Cougars	7.42 *
1998	Angie Vaughn	Texas Longhorns	7.41 *
1999	Joyce Bates	LSU Lady Tigers	8.02
2000	Vonette Dixon	Auburn Tigers	7.94
2001	Donica Merriman	Ohio State Buckeyes	7.95
2002	Perdita Felicien	Illinois Fighting Illini	7.90
2003	Lolo Jones	LSU Lady Tigers	8.00
2004	Priscilla Lopes	Nebraska Cornhuskers	7.96
2005	Virginia Powell	USC Trojans	7.97
2006	Virginia Powell	USC Trojans	7.84
2007	Shantia Moss	Georgia Tech Yellow Jackets	7.98
2008	Tiffany Ofili	Michigan Wolverines	7.94
2009	Tiffany Ofili	Michigan Wolverines	8.00
2010	Queen Claye	Virginia Tech Hokies	7.95
2011	Brianna Rollins	Clemson Tigers	7.96
2012	Christina Clemons	Ohio State Buckeyes	7.91
2013	Brianna Rollins	Clemson Tigers	7.79
2014	Sharika Nelvis	Arkansas State Red Wolves	7.93 A
2015	Keni Harrison	Kentucky Wildcats	7.87
2016	Cindy Sember	Michigan Wolverines	7.89
2017	Sasha Wallace	Oregon Ducks	7.90
2018	Payton Chadwick	Arkansas Razorbacks	7.93
2019	Chanel Brissett	USC Trojans	7.90
2021	Ackera Nugent	Baylor Bears	7.92
2022	Grace Stark	Florida Gators	7.78
2023	Ackera Nugent	Arkansas Razorbacks	7.73 A
2024	Jasmine Jones	USC Trojans	7.77
2025	Jaiya Covington	Texas A&M Aggies	7.90
2026	Aaliyah McCormick	Oregon Ducks	7.86

Men's 60 m hurdles / 55 m hurdles / 60 yd hurdles winners
Year	Athlete	Team	Time
1965	Gene Washington	Michigan St	7.2 y
1966	Jerry Cerulla	Utah St	7.2 y
1967	Earl McCullouch	Southern Cal	7.0 y
1968	Richmond Flowers	Tennessee	7.0 y
1969	Ervin Hall	Villanova	7.0 y
1970	Tom Hill	Arkansas St	6.9 y
1971	Marcus Walker	Colorado	7.0 y
1972	Tom McMannon	Notre Dame	7.2 y
1973	Rod Milburn	Southern-BR	6.9 y
1974	Danny Smith (BAH)	Florida St	7.0 y
1975	Danny Smith (BAH)	Florida St	7.0 y
1976	Allen Misher	Louisiana St	7.29 y
1977	Jeff Lee	Nebraska	7.17 y
1978	Renaldo Nehemiah	Maryland	7.16 y
1979	Renaldo Nehemiah	Maryland	6.90 y
1980	Rodney Wilson	Villanova	7.15 y
1981	Terron Wright	Memphis St	7.14 y
1982	Tonie Campbell	Southern Cal	7.14 y
1983	Willie Gault	Tennessee	6.98 y
1984	Roger Kingdom	Pittsburgh	7.08 *
1985	Henry Andrade	Southern Meth	7.16 *
1986	Thomas Wilcher	Michigan	7.22 *
1987	Keith Talley	Alabama	7.13 *
1988	James Purvis	Georgia Tech	7.13 *
1989	Earl Diamond	Florida	7.19 *
1990	Li Tong (CHN)	Wash St	7.13 *
1991	Li Tong (CHN)	Wash St	7.08 *
1992	Allen Johnson	North Carolina	7.07 *
1993	Glenn Terry	Indiana	7.13 *
1994	Robert Foster (JAM)	Fresno St	7.11 *
1995	Phillip Riley	Florida St	7.10 *
1996	Darius Pemberton	Houston	7.14 *
1997	Neil Gardner (JAM)	Michigan	7.18 *
1998	Larry Wade	Texas A&M	7.11 *
1999	Terrence Trammell	South Carolina	7.52
2000	Terrence Trammell	South Carolina	7.55
2001	Aubrey Herring	Indiana St	7.61
2002	Ron Bramlett	Alabama	7.59
2003	Jabari Greer	Tennessee	7.55
2004	Antwon Hicks	Mississippi	7.61
2005	Antwon Hicks	Mississippi	7.64
2006	Aries Merritt	Tennessee	7.51
2007	Jeff Porter	Michigan	7.61
2008	Drew Brunson	Florida St	7.53
2009	Ronnie Ash	Bethune–Cookman Wildcats	7.63
2010	Ronnie Ash	Oklahoma Sooners	7.56
2011	Andrew Riley	Illinois Fighting Illini	7.58
2012	Jarret Eaton	Syracuse Orange	7.54
2013	Eddie Lovett	Florida Gators	7.50
2014	Omar McLeod	Arkansas Razorbacks	7.58 A
2015	Omar McLeod	Arkansas Razorbacks	7.45
2016	Devon Allen	Oregon Ducks	7.56
2017	Grant Holloway	Florida Gators	7.58
2018	Grant Holloway	Florida Gators	7.47
2019	Grant Holloway	Florida Gators	7.35
2021	Damion Thomas	LSU Tigers	7.51
2022	Trey Cunningham	Florida State Seminoles	7.38
2023	Giano Roberts	Clemson Tigers	7.55 A
2024	Caleb Dean	Texas Tech Red Raiders	7.56
2025	Ja'Kobe Tharp	Auburn Tigers	7.45
2026	Ja'Kobe Tharp	Auburn Tigers	7.32
