= Mile run at the NCAA Division I Indoor Track and Field Championships =

The mile run and its metric 1500 metres equivalent have been held at the NCAA Division I Indoor Track and Field Championships since its founding in 1965. With the exception of two 1500 m races contested in 1984 and 1985, the mile is the only event on the NCAA schedule that has not transitioned from imperial measurements to metric. Hand timing was used until 1975, while starting in 1976 fully automatic timing was used. In 1986 and 1987, the 1/10-mile track that the races were run on was 25 inches (640 mm) per lap short, making the actual race distance less than one mile those years.

== Winners ==
Key
y=yards
A=Altitude assisted
*=Contested at 1500 meters distance

Women's mile run / 1500 m winners
Year	Athlete	Team	Time
1983	Aisling Molloy	BYU Cougars	4:44.87
1984	Linda Detlefsen	Georgia Bulldogs	4:21.32 (Note: Contested at 1500 metres distance)
1985	Tina Krebs	Clemson Tigers	4:17.85 (Note: Contested at 1500 metres distance)
1986	Tina Krebs (Note: The University of Alabama's Liz McColgan originally won the race in a time of 4:37.73, with Krebs second. However, on the weekend of May 10-11, 1986, McColgan and two other athletes accepted prize money for finishing a 10K run in Tupelo, Mississippi. McColgan was cleared in that incident due to returning the prize check before it was cashed, but later that month an investigation found she had competed in other road races compromising her amateur status, and was disqualified from NCAA events.)	Clemson Tigers	4:40.82
1987	Suzy Favor	Wisconsin Badgers	4:41.69
1988	Vicki Huber	Villanova Wildcats	4:31.46
1989	Suzy Favor	Wisconsin Badgers	4:30.63
1990	Suzy Favor	Wisconsin Badgers	4:38.19
1991	Jennifer Lanctot	Boston University Terriers	4:35.65
1992	Karen Glerum	Iowa State Cyclones	4:36.43
1993	Clare Eichner	Wisconsin Badgers	4:38.64
1994	Amy Rudolph	Providence Friars	4:37.64
1995	Trine Pilskog	Arkansas Razorbacks	4:39.19
1996	Joline Staeheli	Georgetown Hoyas	4:36.96
1997	Becki Wells	Florida Gators	4:33.04
1998	Carmen Douma	Villanova Wildcats	4:37.74
1999	Kate Vermeulen	West Virginia Mountaineers	4:39.07
2000	Carmen Douma	Villanova Wildcats	4:39.91
2001	Tracy Robertson	Arkansas Razorbacks	4:39.10
2002	Heather Sagan	Liberty Lady Flames	4:38.52
2003	Johanna Nilsson	Northern Arizona Lumberjacks	4:32.49
2004	Tiffany McWilliams	Mississippi State Bulldogs	4:32.24
2005	Anne Shadle	Nebraska Cornhuskers	4:38.23
2006	Johanna Nilsson	Northern Arizona Lumberjacks	4:37.78
2007	Shannon Rowbury	Duke Blue Devils	4:42.17
2008	Hannah England	Florida State Seminoles	4:35.30
2009	Sarah Brown	Tennessee Volunteers	4:29.72
2010	Charlotte Browning	Florida Gators	4:35.66
2011	Jordan Hasay	Oregon Ducks	4:33.01
2012	Lucy Van Dalen	Stony Brook Seawolves	4:39.76
2013	Emma Coburn	Colorado Buffaloes	4:29.91
2014	Emily Lipari	Villanova Wildcats	4:38.82 A
2015	Leah Falland	Michigan State Spartans	4:27.18
2016	Kaela Edwards	Oklahoma State Cowgirls	4:35.62
2017	Karisa Nelson	Samford Bulldogs	4:31.24
2018	Elle Purrier St. Pierre	New Hampshire Wildcats	4:31.76
2019	Julia Rizk	Ohio State Buckeyes	4:37.63
2021	Sage Hurta	Colorado Buffaloes	4:30.58
2022	Micaela Degenero	Colorado Buffaloes	4:33.92
2023	Olivia Howell	Illinois Fighting Illini	4:34.00 A
2024	Maia Ramsden	Harvard Crimson	4:25.13
2025	(Sweden) Wilma Nielsen	Oregon Ducks	4:32.40
2026	(Sweden) Wilma Nielsen	Oregon Ducks	4:40.06

Men's mile run / 1500 m winners
Year	Name, (Country)	Team	Time
1965	Chris Johnson	Southern Cal	4:08.0
1966	Conrad Nightingale	Kansas St	4:03.4
1967	Jim Ryun	Kansas	3:58.6
1968	Jim Ryun	Kansas	4:06.8
1969	Jim Ryun	Kansas	4:02.6
1970	Howell Michael	William & Mary	4:03.1
1971	Marty Liquori	Villanova	4:04.7
1972	Ken Popejoy	Michigan St	4:02.9
1973	Dave Wottle	Bowling Green	4:03.4
1974	Tony Waldrop	North Carolina	3:59.5
1975	Eamonn Coghlan Ireland	Villanova	4:02.0
1976	Eamonn Coghlan Ireland	Villanova	4:01.48
1977	Wilson Waigwa Kenya	UTEP	3:58.97
1978	James Munyala Kenya	UTEP	3:59.81
1979	Suleiman Nyambui Tanzania	UTEP	3:57.89
1980	Suleiman Nyambui Tanzania	UTEP	4:05.26
1981	Suleiman Nyambui Tanzania	UTEP	4:01.85
1982	Suleiman Nyambui Tanzania	UTEP	4:00.65
1983	Jim Spivey	Indiana	3:59.95
1984	Bob Verbeeck Belgium	Iowa St	3:52.85*
1985	Paul Donovan Ireland	Arkansas	3:43.48*
1986	Paul Larkins United Kingdom	Oklahoma St	4:01.38†
1987	Michael Stahr	Georgetown	4:02.33†
1988	Joe Falcon	Arkansas	3:59.78
1989	Joe Falcon	Arkansas	3:58.06
1990	Bob Whelan	Kentucky	3:58.77
1991	Bob Kennedy	Indiana	3:58.11
1992	Andy Keith United Kingdom	Providence	4:02.39
1993	Niall Bruton Ireland	Arkansas	4:00.05
1994	Niall Bruton Ireland	Arkansas	3:59.34
1995	Kevin Sullivan Canada	Michigan	3:55.33
1996	Julius Achon Uganda	George Mason	4:02.83
1997	Julius Achon Uganda	George Mason	3:59.85
1998	Kevin Sullivan Canada	Michigan	4:03.54
1999	Bernard Lagat Kenya	Wash St	3:55.65
2000	Gabe Jennings	Stanford	3:59.46
2001	Bryan Berryhill	Colorado St	3:56.84
2002	Christian Goy Germany	Illinois St	4:00.06
2003	Chris Mulvaney United Kingdom	Arkansas	4:05.70
2004	Sean Jefferson	Indiana	4:00.16
2005	Nick Willis New Zealand	Michigan	4:00.69
2006	Christian Smith	Kansas St	4:12.75
2007	Leonel Manzano	Texas	3:59.90
2008	Leonel Manzano	Texas	4:04:45
2009	Lee Emanuel	New Mexico	4:00.36
2010	Lee Emanuel	New Mexico	3:59.26
2011	Miles Batty	BYU	3:59.49
2012	Chris O'Hare	Tulsa	4:01.66
2013	Lawi Lalang	Arizona	3:54.74
2014	Anthony Rotich	UTEP	4:02.54
2015	Edward Cheserek	Oregon	3:57.94
2016	Henry Wynne	Virginia	4:06.63
2017	Josh Kerr	New Mexico	4:03.22
2018	Josh Kerr	New Mexico	4:02.03
2019	Geordie Beamish	NAU	4:07.69
2020	CANCELED		
2021	Cole Hocker	Oregon	3:53.71 MR
2022	Mario García Romo	University of Mississippi	4:07.54
2023	Luke Houser	Washington	4:03.33
2024	Luke Houser	Washington	4:01.72
2025	Abel Teffra	Georgetown Hoyas	3:53.60
2026	Carter Cutting	BYU Cougars	3:58.94
