= West Virginia Mountaineers track and field =

American college athletics team

- University: West Virginia University
- Head coach: Sean Cleary
- Conference: Big 12
- Location: Morgantown, West Virginia
- Outdoor track: Mylan Track
- Nickname: Mountaineers
- Colors: Gold and blue

The West Virginia Mountaineers track and field team is the track and field program that represents West Virginia University. The Mountaineers compete in NCAA Division I as a member of the Big 12 Conference. The team is based in Morgantown, West Virginia, at the Mylan Track.

The program is coached by Sean Cleary. The track and field program officially encompasses four teams because the NCAA considers men's and women's indoor track and field and outdoor track and field as separate sports.

The West Virginia men's track and field team began in 1905. Both the indoor and outdoor men's track teams were cut in 2003 along with three other men's sports, leaving only a women's track and field program at the school since then.

Morgan Mossner was the first Mountaineer to earn an NCAA title, winning the indoor 1000 meters in 1972.

== Postseason ==
As of August 2025, a total of 10 men and 35 women have achieved individual first-team All-American status for the team at the Division I men's outdoor, women's outdoor, men's indoor, or women's indoor national championships (using the modern criteria of top-8 placing regardless of athlete nationality).

First team NCAA All-Americans
Team	Championships	Name	Event	Place	Ref.
Men's	1932 Outdoor	Gantt Miller	Hammer throw	3rd	
Men's	1933 Outdoor	Gantt Miller	Hammer throw	4th	
Men's	1934 Outdoor	Gantt Miller	Hammer throw	5th	
Men's	1966 Indoor	John Carter	Pole vault	2nd	
Men's	1970 Outdoor	Mike Mosser	Mile run	6th	
Men's	1971 Indoor	Morgan Mosser	1000 meters	3rd	
Men's	1972 Indoor	Morgan Mosser	1000 meters	1st	
Men's	1978 Outdoor	Garnett Edwards	110 meters hurdles	7th	
Men's	1979 Indoor	Garnet Edwards	55 meters hurdles	2nd	
Men's	1979 Outdoor	Garnett Edwards	110 meters hurdles	7th	
Men's	1980 Outdoor	Garnett Edwards	110 meters hurdles	7th	
Men's	1985 Outdoor	Jean-Pierre Ndayisenga	5000 meters	6th	
Men's	1986 Indoor	Jean-Pierre Ndayisenga	3000 meters	3rd	
Men's	1988 Indoor	Benny Cureton	200 meters	7th	
Women's	1988 Outdoor	Connie Ellerbe	400 meters hurdles	7th	
Men's	1990 Indoor	James Jett	55 meters	5th	
Women's	1990 Outdoor	Althea Moody	High jump	6th	
Men's	1991 Indoor	James Jett	200 meters	5th	
Men's	1991 Outdoor	James Jett	100 meters	7th	
Men's	1991 Outdoor	James Jett	200 meters	5th	
Women's	1991 Outdoor	Connie Ellerbe	400 meters hurdles	4th	
Men's	1992 Indoor	James Jett	200 meters	3rd	
Men's	1992 Outdoor	James Jett	100 meters	2nd	
Men's	1992 Outdoor	James Jett	200 meters	2nd	
Women's	1992 Outdoor	Connie Ellerbe	400 meters hurdles	2nd	
Men's	1994 Indoor	Bob Donker	5000 meters	7th	
Men's	1994 Outdoor	Bob Donker	5000 meters	5th	
Men's	1995 Indoor	Bob Donker	5000 meters	6th	
Women's	1995 Indoor	Pat Itanyi	55 meters hurdles	5th	
Women's	1995 Indoor	Pat Itanyi	Long jump	3rd	
Women's	1995 Outdoor	Pat Itanyi	Long jump	1st	
Women's	1996 Indoor	Pat Itanyi	Long jump	5th	
Women's	1997 Indoor	Pat Itanyi	Long jump	8th	
Women's	1997 Outdoor	Pat Itanyi	Long jump	3rd	
Women's	1997 Outdoor	Pat Itanyi	Heptathlon	5th	
Women's	1998 Outdoor	Charity Wachera	10,000 meters	6th	
Women's	1998 Outdoor	Kristen Quackenbush	Pole vault	4th	
Women's	1999 Indoor	Kate Vermeulen	Mile run	1st	
Women's	1999 Indoor	Rebecca Stallwood	Distance medley relay	5th	
Women's	1999 Indoor	Tameca Williams	Distance medley relay	5th	
Women's	1999 Indoor	Merissa Sexsmith	Distance medley relay	5th	
Women's	1999 Indoor	Kate Vermeulen	Distance medley relay	5th	
Women's	2000 Indoor	Merissa Sexsmith	Distance medley relay	8th	
Women's	2000 Indoor	Tameca Williams	Distance medley relay	8th	
Women's	2000 Indoor	Ailene Smith	Distance medley relay	8th	
Women's	2000 Indoor	Rebecca Stallwood	Distance medley relay	8th	
Women's	2000 Indoor	Christine Brown	Triple jump	6th	
Women's	2001 Indoor	Merissa Sexsmith	Distance medley relay	8th	
Women's	2001 Indoor	Ciara Chic	Distance medley relay	8th	
Women's	2001 Indoor	Aileen Smith	Distance medley relay	8th	
Women's	2001 Indoor	Megan Metcalfe	Distance medley relay	8th	
Women's	2002 Indoor	Megan Metcalfe	3000 meters	3rd	
Women's	2003 Indoor	Megan Metcalfe	3000 meters	4th	
Women's	2003 Indoor	Jennifer Kemp	Distance medley relay	4th	
Women's	2003 Indoor	Pam Richardson	Distance medley relay	4th	
Women's	2003 Indoor	Aileen Smith	Distance medley relay	4th	
Women's	2003 Indoor	Megan Metcalfe	Distance medley relay	4th	
Women's	2004 Indoor	Megan Metcalfe	3000 meters	5th	
Women's	2004 Indoor	Jennifer Davis	Distance medley relay	5th	
Women's	2004 Indoor	Pam Richardson	Distance medley relay	5th	
Women's	2004 Indoor	Jennifer Kemp	Distance medley relay	5th	
Women's	2004 Indoor	Megan Metcalfe	Distance medley relay	5th	
Women's	2005 Indoor	Susan Davis	Distance medley relay	6th	
Women's	2005 Indoor	Pam Richardson	Distance medley relay	6th	
Women's	2005 Indoor	Jennifer Kemp	Distance medley relay	6th	
Women's	2005 Indoor	Jennifer Davis	Distance medley relay	6th	
Women's	2005 Outdoor	Megan Metcalfe	5000 meters	1st	
Women's	2007 Indoor	Abbie Stechschulte	Pentathlon	6th	
Women's	2008 Indoor	Marie-Louise Asselin	3000 meters	7th	
Women's	2008 Indoor	Marie-Louise Asselin	Distance medley relay	4th	
Women's	2008 Indoor	April Rotilio	Distance medley relay	4th	
Women's	2008 Indoor	Karly Hamric	Distance medley relay	4th	
Women's	2008 Indoor	Keri Bland	Distance medley relay	4th	
Women's	2009 Outdoor	Clara Grandt	10,000 meters	4th	
Women's	2010 Indoor	Chelsea Carrier-Eades	60 meters hurdles	6th	
Women's	2010 Indoor	Keri Bland	Mile run	8th	
Women's	2010 Indoor	Marie-Louise Asselin	5000 meters	2nd	
Women's	2010 Indoor	Keri Bland	Distance medley relay	8th	
Women's	2010 Indoor	April Rotilio	Distance medley relay	8th	
Women's	2010 Indoor	Kaylyn Christopher	Distance medley relay	8th	
Women's	2010 Indoor	Jessica O'Connell	Distance medley relay	8th	
Women's	2010 Indoor	Chelsea Carrier-Eades	Pentathlon	4th	
Women's	2010 Outdoor	Karly Hamric	1500 meters	6th	
Women's	2010 Outdoor	Marie-Louise Asselin	5000 meters	2nd	
Women's	2010 Outdoor	Clara Grandt	10,000 meters	4th	
Women's	2011 Indoor	Chelsea Carrier-Eades	60 meters hurdles	4th	
Women's	2011 Indoor	Keri Bland	Mile run	6th	
Women's	2011 Indoor	Chelsea Carrier-Eades	Pentathlon	5th	
Women's	2011 Outdoor	Kate Harrison	10,000 meters	2nd	
Women's	2011 Outdoor	Chelsea Carrier-Eades	Heptathlon	3rd	
Women's	2012 Outdoor	Chelsea Carrier-Eades	100 meters hurdles	7th	
Women's	2012 Outdoor	Chelsea Carrier-Eades	Heptathlon	3rd	
Women's	2013 Indoor	Kelly Williams	Mile run	7th	
Women's	2014 Outdoor	Stormy Nesbit	Triple jump	8th	
Women's	2018 Outdoor	Maddie Gardner	Pole vault	8th	
Women's	2021 Outdoor	Ceili McCabe	3000 meters steeplechase	6th	
Women's	2022 Indoor	Ceili McCabe	3000 meters	8th	
Women's	2022 Outdoor	Ceili McCabe	3000 meters steeplechase	3rd	
Women's	2023 Indoor	Ceili McCabe	3000 meters	6th	
Women's	2023 Outdoor	Ceili McCabe	3000 meters steeplechase	3rd	
Women's	2024 Indoor	Ceili McCabe	Mile run	6th	
Women's	2025 Indoor	Ceili McCabe	3000 meters	1st	
Women's	2025 Outdoor	Sarah Tait	3000 meters steeplechase	4th	
Women's	2025 Outdoor	Joy Naukot	10,000 meters	3rd	

== See also ==
- Category:West Virginia Mountaineers men's track and field athletes (5)
- Category:West Virginia Mountaineers women's track and field athletes (7)
