= Fresno State Bulldogs track and field =

American college track and field team

- University: California State University, Fresno
- Head coach: Jason Drake
- Conference: Pac-12
- Location: Fresno, California
- Outdoor track: Warmerdam Field
- Nickname: Bulldogs
- Colors: Cardinal red and blue

The Fresno State Bulldogs track and field team is the track and field program that represents California State University, Fresno. The Bulldogs compete in NCAA Division I as a member of the Pac-12 Conference. The team is based in Fresno, California, at the Warmerdam Field.

The program is coached by Jason Drake. The track and field program officially encompasses four teams because the NCAA considers men's and women's indoor track and field and outdoor track and field as separate sports.

High jumper Walter Marty was the school's first NCAA individual champion. He won the high jump at the 1934 NCAA Track and Field Championships.

== Postseason ==
=== AIAW ===
The Bulldogs have had one AIAW All-American finishing in the top six at the AIAW indoor or outdoor championships.

AIAW All-Americans
Championships	Name	Event	Place
1973 Outdoor	Iva Wright	Shot put	4th
1973 Outdoor	Iva Wright	Discus throw	3rd
1974 Outdoor	Iva Wright	Shot put	3rd
1974 Outdoor	Iva Wright	Discus throw	1st

=== NCAA ===
As of August 2025, a total of 61 men and 20 women have achieved individual first-team All-American status for the team at the Division I men's outdoor, women's outdoor, men's indoor, or women's indoor national championships (using the modern criteria of top-8 placing regardless of athlete nationality).

First team NCAA All-Americans
Team	Championships	Name	Event	Place	Ref.
Men's	1934 Outdoor	Elroy Robinson	800 meters	4th	
Men's	1934 Outdoor	Walter Marty	High jump	1st	
Men's	1934 Outdoor	Floyd Wilson	Long jump	3rd	
Men's	1935 Outdoor	Milton Holt	100 meters	8th	
Men's	1935 Outdoor	Elroy Robinson	800 meters	1st	
Men's	1935 Outdoor	Clarence Rowland	Javelin throw	3rd	
Men's	1939 Outdoor	Tommy Nelson	100 meters	6th	
Men's	1940 Outdoor	Bobby Madrid	3000 meters	6th	
Men's	1940 Outdoor	George Hoffman	Pole vault	2nd	
Men's	1941 Outdoor	Bobby Madrid	3000 meters	2nd	
Men's	1942 Outdoor	Art Cazares	3000 meters	1st	
Men's	1943 Outdoor	Lou Futrell	220 yards hurdles	4th	
Men's	1944 Outdoor	Joe Shropshire	400 meters	4th	
Men's	1944 Outdoor	Joe Shropshire	800 meters	4th	
Men's	1945 Outdoor	Glen Shaffer	110 meters hurdles	2nd	
Men's	1945 Outdoor	Glen Shaffer	220 yards hurdles	4th	
Men's	1945 Outdoor	Joe Shropshire	400 meters	6th	
Men's	1947 Outdoor	Garold Gaines	Javelin throw	3rd	
Men's	1947 Outdoor	Paul Ferdinandson	Javelin throw	4th	
Men's	1948 Outdoor	Dick Vierra	10,000 meters	4th	
Men's	1951 Outdoor	Bob Stout	3000 meters	5th	
Men's	1952 Outdoor	Bob Fries	3000 meters steeplechase	7th	
Men's	1952 Outdoor	Fred Barnes	Pole vault	6th	
Men's	1953 Outdoor	Les Laing	100 meters	3rd	
Men's	1953 Outdoor	Les Laing	200 meters	3rd	
Men's	1953 Outdoor	Fred Barnes	Pole vault	1st	
Men's	1954 Outdoor	Fred Barnes	Pole vault	3rd	
Men's	1956 Outdoor	Mike Agostini	100 meters	3rd	
Men's	1956 Outdoor	Ancel Robinson	110 meters hurdles	4th	
Men's	1956 Outdoor	Mike Agostini	200 meters	4th	
Men's	1956 Outdoor	Bob Brodt	Pole vault	7th	
Men's	1957 Outdoor	Ancel Robinson	220 yards hurdles	1st	
Men's	1957 Outdoor	Mike Agostini	100 meters	4th	
Men's	1957 Outdoor	Ancel Robinson	110 meters hurdles	2nd	
Men's	1957 Outdoor	Jack Wilcox	800 meters	6th	
Men's	1958 Outdoor	Jack Wilcox	800 meters	3rd	
Men's	1963 Outdoor	Sid Nickolas	110 meters hurdles	6th	
Men's	1963 Outdoor	Sid Nickolas	Long jump	5th	
Men's	1963 Outdoor	Charlie Craig	Triple jump	2nd	
Men's	1964 Outdoor	Darel Newman	100 meters	4th	
Men's	1964 Outdoor	Sam Workman	200 meters	7th	
Men's	1964 Outdoor	Marv Bryant	4 × 100 meters relay	2nd	
Men's	1964 Outdoor	Charlie Craig	4 × 100 meters relay	2nd	
Men's	1964 Outdoor	Sam Workman	4 × 100 meters relay	2nd	
Men's	1964 Outdoor	Sid Nickolas	4 × 100 meters relay	2nd	
Men's	1964 Outdoor	Sid Nickolas	Long jump	2nd	
Men's	1964 Outdoor	Charlie Craig	Triple jump	1st	
Men's	1965 Indoor	Darel Newman	55 meters	2nd	
Men's	1965 Outdoor	Darel Newman	100 meters	2nd	
Men's	1965 Outdoor	Sam Workman	100 meters	7th	
Men's	1966 Outdoor	Paul Fuller	Triple jump	8th	
Men's	1968 Outdoor	Erkki Mustakari	Pole vault	4th	
Men's	1968 Outdoor	Kenth Svensson	Discus throw	8th	
Men's	1969 Outdoor	Erkki Mustakari	Pole vault	4th	
Men's	1971 Outdoor	Roger George	Decathlon	8th	
Men's	1972 Outdoor	Roger George	Decathlon	4th	
Men's	1973 Outdoor	Roger George	Decathlon	2nd	
Men's	1974 Outdoor	Mike Giroux	Hammer throw	8th	
Men's	1974 Outdoor	Roger George	Decathlon	2nd	
Men's	1975 Outdoor	Mike Giroux	Hammer throw	7th	
Men's	1977 Outdoor	Steve Campbell	400 meters	3rd	
Men's	1979 Outdoor	Dennis Morely	Javelin throw	8th	
Men's	1980 Indoor	Matt Mileham	Weight throw	6th	
Men's	1980 Outdoor	Matt Mileham	Hammer throw	2nd	
Men's	1981 Indoor	Matt Mileham	Weight throw	3rd	
Men's	1981 Indoor	Rick Fritzemeier	Weight throw	6th	
Men's	1981 Outdoor	Matt Mileham	Hammer throw	3rd	
Men's	1982 Indoor	Matt Mileham	Weight throw	6th	
Men's	1982 Outdoor	Henry Ellard	Triple jump	7th	
Men's	1982 Outdoor	Matt Mileham	Hammer throw	5th	
Men's	1983 Indoor	Matt Mileham	Weight throw	3rd	
Men's	1983 Outdoor	George Gaffney	Long jump	7th	
Women's	1983 Outdoor	Renee Wyckoff	3000 meters	8th	
Men's	1984 Outdoor	Matt Mileham	Hammer throw	1st	
Men's	1984 Outdoor	Pete Mansur	Decathlon	6th	
Women's	1985 Indoor	Dot Jones	Shot put	5th	
Men's	1985 Outdoor	Doug Fraley	Pole vault	3rd	
Women's	1985 Outdoor	Tonya Medonca	High jump	5th	
Women's	1985 Outdoor	Dot Jones	Shot put	4th	
Women's	1985 Outdoor	Lacy Barnes	Discus throw	2nd	
Men's	1986 Indoor	Doug Fraley	Pole vault	1st	
Women's	1986 Indoor	Dot Jones	Shot put	4th	
Men's	1986 Outdoor	Jeff Roberson	800 meters	2nd	
Men's	1986 Outdoor	Mark Heppner	Pole vault	2nd	
Men's	1986 Outdoor	Doug Fraley	Pole vault	3rd	
Men's	1986 Outdoor	Ken Frazier	Triple jump	6th	
Women's	1986 Outdoor	Tonya Mendonca	High jump	7th	
Men's	1987 Indoor	Doug Fraley	Pole vault	1st	
Men's	1987 Indoor	John Bender	Shot put	5th	
Men's	1987 Indoor	Mike Ostrom	Weight throw	5th	
Men's	1987 Indoor	John Bender	Weight throw	8th	
Women's	1987 Indoor	Tamara Compton	Triple jump	6th	
Men's	1987 Outdoor	Doug Fraley	Pole vault	1st	
Men's	1987 Outdoor	John Bender	Shot put	5th	
Men's	1987 Outdoor	Daron Crass	Hammer throw	8th	
Men's	1987 Outdoor	Roy Seidmeyer	Javelin throw	8th	
Women's	1987 Outdoor	Tona Mendonca	High jump	8th	
Women's	1987 Outdoor	Lacy Barnes	Discus throw	2nd	
Men's	1988 Indoor	John Bender	Shot put	3rd	
Men's	1988 Indoor	Mike Ostrom	Weight throw	5th	
Men's	1988 Indoor	Daron Crass	Weight throw	8th	
Women's	1988 Indoor	Tonya Mendonca	High jump	6th	
Women's	1988 Indoor	Tamara Compton	Triple jump	5th	
Men's	1988 Outdoor	John Bender	Shot put	2nd	
Men's	1988 Outdoor	Mike Ostrom	Hammer throw	5th	
Women's	1988 Outdoor	Lacy Barnes	Discus throw	2nd	
Men's	1989 Outdoor	Reggie Jackson	Triple jump	8th	
Men's	1990 Indoor	Reggie Jackson	Triple jump	4th	
Men's	1990 Indoor	Andy Harris	Weight throw	6th	
Men's	1990 Outdoor	Reggie Jackson	Triple jump	4th	
Men's	1990 Outdoor	Andy Harris	Hammer throw	8th	
Women's	1990 Outdoor	Nicole Carroll	Javelin throw	7th	
Men's	1991 Outdoor	Todd Riech	Javelin throw	4th	
Women's	1991 Outdoor	Danene Bitter	Javelin throw	5th	
Women's	1991 Outdoor	Nicole Carroll	Javelin throw	6th	
Men's	1992 Indoor	Reggie Jackson	Triple jump	6th	
Men's	1992 Indoor	Roshawn James	Weight throw	3rd	
Men's	1992 Outdoor	Todd Riech	Javelin throw	4th	
Men's	1993 Indoor	David Cox	Pole vault	5th	
Women's	1993 Indoor	Shannon Lieder	800 meters	6th	
Men's	1993 Outdoor	David Cox	Pole vault	7th	
Women's	1993 Outdoor	Tanya Dooley	400 meters	7th	
Men's	1994 Indoor	Robert Foster	55 meters hurdles	1st	
Men's	1994 Indoor	Jamey Harris	Mile run	7th	
Men's	1994 Indoor	David Cox	Pole vault	7th	
Women's	1994 Indoor	Tanya Dooley	400 meters	3rd	
Men's	1994 Outdoor	Terry Bowen	100 meters	4th	
Men's	1994 Outdoor	Robert Foster	110 meters hurdles	1st	
Men's	1994 Outdoor	David Cox	Pole vault	6th	
Men's	1994 Outdoor	Todd Riech	Javelin throw	1st	
Men's	1995 Indoor	David Cox	Pole vault	3rd	
Men's	1995 Indoor	Heath Fulk	Pole vault	6th	
Men's	1996 Indoor	Moses Kearney	High jump	6th	
Women's	1996 Indoor	Staci Darden	Weight throw	6th	
Men's	1996 Outdoor	David Cox	Pole vault	2nd	
Women's	1996 Outdoor	Felecia Brown	Heptathlon	6th	
Men's	1998 Indoor	Ephion Jackson	55 meters	6th	
Women's	1998 Indoor	Melissa Price	Pole vault	1st	
Women's	1998 Indoor	Staci Darden	Weight throw	6th	
Men's	1998 Outdoor	E.J. Jackson	4 × 100 meters relay	3rd	
Men's	1998 Outdoor	Demetrius Snaer	4 × 100 meters relay	3rd	
Men's	1998 Outdoor	Mike Ward	4 × 100 meters relay	3rd	
Men's	1998 Outdoor	Etroy Nelson	4 × 100 meters relay	3rd	
Men's	1999 Indoor	Jim Davis	Pole vault	4th	
Women's	1999 Indoor	Melissa Price	Pole vault	1st	
Men's	1999 Outdoor	Jim Davis	Pole vault	6th	
Women's	1999 Outdoor	Melissa Price	Pole vault	6th	
Men's	2000 Outdoor	Jim Davis	Pole vault	6th	
Men's	2001 Outdoor	Ryan Beckenhauer	Shot put	8th	
Women's	2004 Outdoor	Mallory Webb	Javelin throw	7th	
Women's	2007 Outdoor	Mallory Webb	Javelin throw	6th	
Men's	2008 Outdoor	Gary Lee	Long jump	5th	
Women's	2009 Indoor	Sharon Ayala	Weight throw	6th	
Women's	2009 Outdoor	Latrisha Jordan	400 meters hurdles	8th	
Women's	2009 Outdoor	Sharon Ayala	Hammer throw	6th	
Women's	2016 Outdoor	Annemarie Schwanz	1500 meters	7th	
Women's	2021 Outdoor	Vanja Spaic	Javelin throw	4th	
Women's	2025 Outdoor	Cierra Jackson	Shot put	8th	
Women's	2025 Outdoor	Cierra Jackson	Discus throw	1st	

== See also ==
- Category:Fresno State Bulldogs men's track and field athletes (11)
- Category:Fresno State Bulldogs women's track and field athletes (8)
