= Syracuse Orange track and field =

College track and field team

- University: Syracuse University
- Head coach: Brien Bell; Chris Fox (distance)
- Conference: ACC
- Location: Syracuse, New York
- Outdoor track: J.S. Coyne Stadium
- Nickname: Orange
- Colors: Orange

The Syracuse Orange track and field team is the track and field program that represents Syracuse University. The Orange compete in NCAA Division I as a member of the Atlantic Coast Conference. The team is based in Syracuse, New York at the J.S. Coyne Stadium.

The program is coached by Brien Bell and Chris Fox (distance). The track and field program officially encompasses four teams because the NCAA considers men's and women's indoor track and field and outdoor track and field as separate sports.

== History ==
The women's program was established in 1979-80 and has produced 21 All-Americans, six individual ACC titles and 80 individual BIG EAST championships from 1983 through 2013.

The Orange's last Olympic medalist was Edward O'Brien, who won silver in the 4 × 400 m relay at the 1936 Olympics.

== Postseason ==
As of 2024, a total of 20 men and 12 women have achieved individual first-team All-American status at the Division I men's outdoor, women's outdoor, men's indoor, or women's indoor national championships (using the modern criteria of top-8 placing regardless of athlete nationality).

First team All-Americans
Team	Championships	Name	Event	Place	Ref.
Men's	1972 Indoor	Bruce Fischer	Mile run	4th	
Men's	1984 Indoor	Mike Morris	55 meters	5th	
Men's	1985 Outdoor	Mike Morris	100 meters	5th	
Men's	1986 Outdoor	Mike Morris	100 meters	5th	
Women's	1987 Indoor	Diane Diphillips	High jump	4th	
Men's	1987 Outdoor	Anthony Washington	Discus throw	3rd	
Men's	1989 Indoor	Anthony Washington	Weight throw	2nd	
Men's	1989 Outdoor	Martin Ellis	400 meters hurdles	7th	
Men's	1989 Outdoor	Anthony Washington	Discus throw	2nd	
Women's	1990 Indoor	Karen Hodgkinson	Shot put	3rd	
Men's	1990 Outdoor	Kevin McQueen	110 meters hurdles	6th	
Men's	1990 Outdoor	Anthony Washington	Discus throw	4th	
Men's	1990 Outdoor	Steve Dering	Hammer throw	6th	
Women's	1990 Outdoor	Karen Hodgkinson	Shot put	4th	
Men's	1991 Indoor	Steve Dering	Weight throw	5th	
Men's	1991 Outdoor	Qadry Ismail	110 meters hurdles	5th	
Men's	1991 Outdoor	Steve Dering	Hammer throw	5th	
Women's	1991 Outdoor	Karen Hodgkinson	Shot put	8th	
Women's	1996 Indoor	Kim Johnson	Weight throw	4th	
Women's	1998 Outdoor	Deniece Bell	400 meters hurdles	7th	
Men's	1999 Indoor	Adrian Woodley	60 meters hurdles	7th	
Men's	1999 Indoor	Samuel Okantey	Triple jump	7th	
Women's	1999 Indoor	Cheree Hicks	Shot put	4th	
Men's	1999 Outdoor	Adrian Woodley	110 meters hurdles	5th	
Men's	1999 Outdoor	Samuel Okantey	Triple jump	6th	
Women's	1999 Outdoor	Cheree Hicks	Shot put	6th	
Women's	1999 Outdoor	Cheree Hicks	Discus throw	3rd	
Women's	2000 Indoor	Cheree Hicks	Shot put	2nd	
Men's	2000 Outdoor	Adrian Woodley	110 meters hurdles	6th	
Women's	2000 Outdoor	Cheree Hicks	Shot put	2nd	
Women's	2000 Outdoor	Cheree Hicks	Discus throw	2nd	
Men's	2007 Outdoor	Michael Leblanc	100 meters	4th	
Women's	2007 Outdoor	Jillian Drouin	Heptathlon	3rd	
Men's	2008 Outdoor	Kyle Heath	3000 meters steeplechase	6th	
Men's	2009 Outdoor	Kyle Heath	3000 meters steeplechase	8th	
Women's	2010 Indoor	Uhunoma Osazuwa	Pentathlon	6th	
Men's	2012 Indoor	Jarret Eaton	60 meters hurdles	1st	
Men's	2012 Outdoor	Jarret Eaton	110 meters hurdles	6th	
Men's	2013 Outdoor	Donald Pollitt	110 meters hurdles	6th	
Women's	2013 Outdoor	Lauren Penney	5000 meters	8th	
Women's	2014 Outdoor	Sarah Pagano	10,000 meters	7th	
Men's	2015 Indoor	Marty Hehir	3000 meters	7th	
Men's	2015 Outdoor	Justyn Knight	5000 meters	6th	
Women's	2015 Outdoor	Margo Malone	10,000 meters	7th	
Men's	2016 Indoor	Freddie Crittenden	60 meters hurdles	2nd	
Men's	2016 Indoor	Adam Palamar	Mile run	8th	
Men's	2016 Indoor	Justyn Knight	3000 meters	3rd	
Men's	2016 Indoor	Colin Bennie	5000 meters	8th	
Men's	2016 Outdoor	Freddie Crittenden	110 meters hurdles	4th	
Men's	2017 Indoor	Freddie Crittenden	60 meters hurdles	2nd	
Men's	2017 Indoor	Adam Palamar	Mile run	5th	
Men's	2017 Indoor	Justyn Knight	3000 meters	2nd	
Men's	2017 Outdoor	Justyn Knight	5000 meters	3rd	
Men's	2018 Indoor	Justyn Knight	3000 meters	2nd	
Men's	2018 Indoor	Justyn Knight	5000 meters	1st	
Women's	2018 Indoor	Paige Stoner	5000 meters	8th	
Men's	2018 Outdoor	Aidan Tooker	3000 meters steeplechase	4th	
Men's	2018 Outdoor	Justyn Knight	5000 meters	2nd	
Women's	2018 Outdoor	Paige Stoner	3000 meters steeplechase	3rd	
Women's	2019 Outdoor	Paige Stoner	10,000 meters	7th	
Men's	2023 Indoor	Jaheem Hayles	60 meters hurdles	4th	
Women's	2023 Indoor	Amanda Vestri	5000 meters	6th	
Men's	2023 Outdoor	Jaheem Hayles	110 meters hurdles	3rd	
Women's	2023 Outdoor	Amanda Vestri	10,000 meters	7th	
Men's	2024 Indoor	Jaheem Hayles	60 meters hurdles	6th	

== See also ==
- Category:Syracuse Orange men's track and field athletes (27)
- Category:Syracuse Orange women's track and field athletes (4)
