= Clemson Tigers track and field =

College track and field team

- University: Clemson University
- Head coach: Mark Elliott; Vicky Pounds (distance)
- Conference: ACC
- Location: Clemson, South Carolina
- Outdoor track: Rock Norman Track & Field Complex
- Nickname: Tigers
- Colors: Orange and regalia

The Clemson Tigers track and field team is the track and field program that represents Clemson University. The Tigers compete in NCAA Division I as a member of the Atlantic Coast Conference. The team is based in Clemson, South Carolina at the Rock Norman Track & Field Complex.

The program is coached by Mark Elliott and Vicky Pounds (distance). The track and field program officially encompasses four teams, as the NCAA regards men's and women's indoor track and field and outdoor track and field as separate sports.

Brianna Rollins-McNeal won the 2013 women's The Bowerman after establishing collegiate records in the 60 m hurdles and 100 m hurdles. She is the only Clemson athlete to win the award.

In 2021, plans were announced to discontinue the men's track and cross country teams. After backlash, the plans were walked back five months later. Michael Green has the most individual NCAA titles of any Clemson track and field athlete, with four over the sprints.

== Postseason ==
=== AIAW ===
The Tigers have had one AIAW All-American finishing in the top six at the AIAW indoor or outdoor championships.

AIAW All-Americans
Championships	Name	Event	Place
1981 Indoor	Cindy Duarte	3000 meters	4th
1981 Outdoor	Cindy Duarte	3000 meters	4th

=== NCAA ===
As of 2024, a total of 67 men and 44 women have achieved individual first-team All-American status at the men's outdoor, women's outdoor, men's indoor, or women's indoor national championships.

First team NCAA All-Americans
Team	Championships	Name	Event	Place	Ref.
Men's	1926 Outdoor	Roy O'Dell	Pole vault	2nd	
Men's	1927 Outdoor	Roy O'Dell	Pole vault	2nd	
Men's	1928 Outdoor	Roy O'Dell	Pole vault	4th	
Men's	1964 Outdoor	Bill William	4 × 400 meters relay	6th	
Men's	1964 Outdoor	Doug Adams	4 × 400 meters relay	6th	
Men's	1964 Outdoor	Fred Cone	4 × 400 meters relay	6th	
Men's	1964 Outdoor	Cecil Huey	4 × 400 meters relay	6th	
Men's	1965 Outdoor	Avery Nelson	Triple jump	5th	
Men's	1968 Outdoor	Roger Collins	Javelin throw	4th	
Men's	1969 Outdoor	Roger Collins	Javelin throw	6th	
Men's	1970 Outdoor	Roger Collins	Javelin throw	4th	
Men's	1977 Outdoor	Mike Columbus	Discus throw	6th	
Men's	1977 Outdoor	Stu Ralph	Javelin throw	3rd	
Men's	1978 Outdoor	Stu Ralph	Javelin throw	2nd	
Men's	1979 Outdoor	Steve Davis	4 × 100 meters relay	7th	
Men's	1979 Outdoor	Dave McKnight	4 × 100 meters relay	7th	
Men's	1979 Outdoor	Ray Daley	4 × 100 meters relay	7th	
Men's	1979 Outdoor	Desai Williams	4 × 100 meters relay	7th	
Men's	1980 Indoor	Hans Koeleman	Mile run	4th	
Men's	1980 Outdoor	Desai Williams	200 meters	4th	
Men's	1980 Outdoor	Tony Sharpe	4 × 100 meters relay	5th	
Men's	1980 Outdoor	Desai Williams	4 × 100 meters relay	5th	
Men's	1980 Outdoor	Steve Davis	4 × 100 meters relay	5th	
Men's	1980 Outdoor	Terrence Toatley	4 × 100 meters relay	5th	
Men's	1981 Indoor	Hans Koeleman	3000 meters	5th	
Men's	1981 Outdoor	Julius Ogaro	3000 meters steeplechase	5th	
Men's	1981 Outdoor	Hans Koeleman	3000 meters steeplechase	6th	
Men's	1981 Outdoor	Mike Hartle	Javelin throw	5th	
Men's	1982 Indoor	Wybo Lelieveld	1000 meters	4th	
Men's	1982 Outdoor	Hans Koeleman	3000 meters steeplechase	8th	
Men's	1982 Outdoor	Jack Harkness	Discus throw	2nd	
Men's	1982 Outdoor	Mike Hartle	Javelin throw	7th	
Women's	1982 Outdoor	Stephanie Weikert	3000 meters	5th	
Men's	1983 Indoor	Wybo Lelieveld	Mile run	5th	
Women's	1983 Indoor	Tina Krebs	1000 meters	1st	
Men's	1983 Outdoor	Wybo Lelieveld	1500 meters	4th	
Women's	1983 Outdoor	Tina Krebs	800 meters	2nd	
Women's	1983 Outdoor	Judith Shepherd	3000 meters	5th	
Men's	1985 Indoor	Victor Smalls	High jump	6th	
Women's	1985 Indoor	Tina Krebs	1500 meters	1st	
Women's	1985 Indoor	Kirsti Voldnes	1500 meters	3rd	
Men's	1985 Outdoor	Victor Smalls	High jump	4th	
Women's	1985 Outdoor	Tina Krebs	1500 meters	4th	
Women's	1986 Indoor	Tina Krebs (Note: Liz McColgan of the Alabama Crimson Tide track and field team originally won the race with Krebs second, but McColgan was later declared ineligible for accepting prize money at road races, compromising her amateur status under rules at the time.)	Mile run	1st	
Men's	1986 Outdoor	Victor Smalls	High jump	6th	
Men's	1986 Outdoor	Mike Spiritoso	Shot put	2nd	
Women's	1986 Outdoor	Tina Krebs	1500 meters	3rd	
Women's	1986 Outdoor	Ute Jamrozy	10,000 meters	4th	
Men's	1987 Indoor	Mike Spiritoso	Shot put	2nd	
Men's	1987 Outdoor	Terrence Herrington	1500 meters	3rd	
Men's	1987 Outdoor	Mike Spiritoso	Shot put	8th	
Men's	1988 Indoor	Yehezkel Halifa	3000 meters	6th	
Men's	1988 Outdoor	Terrence Herrington	800 meters	4th	
Men's	1988 Outdoor	Dov Kremer	5000 meters	2nd	
Men's	1988 Outdoor	Yehezkel Halifa	10,000 meters	5th	
Men's	1989 Indoor	Greg Moses	55 meters	4th	
Men's	1989 Indoor	Yehezkel Halifa	5000 meters	4th	
Men's	1989 Indoor	Dov Kremer	5000 meters	6th	
Men's	1989 Indoor	Mike Radziwinski	4 × 800 meters relay	1st	
Men's	1989 Indoor	Dave Wittman	4 × 800 meters relay	1st	
Men's	1989 Indoor	Phil Greyling	4 × 800 meters relay	1st	
Men's	1989 Indoor	Terrance Herrington	4 × 800 meters relay	1st	
Men's	1989 Outdoor	Terrence Herrington	1500 meters	3rd	
Men's	1989 Outdoor	Phillip Greyling	1500 meters	8th	
Men's	1989 Outdoor	Dov Kremer	5000 meters	5th	
Men's	1990 Indoor	James Trapp	55 meters	6th	
Men's	1990 Indoor	Phillip Greyling	4 × 800 meters relay	3rd	
Men's	1990 Indoor	Dennis Hines	4 × 800 meters relay	3rd	
Men's	1990 Indoor	Dave Wittman	4 × 800 meters relay	3rd	
Men's	1990 Indoor	Andrew Beecher	4 × 800 meters relay	3rd	
Women's	1990 Indoor	Lisa Dillard	55 meters	5th	
Men's	1990 Outdoor	James Trapp	100 meters	5th	
Men's	1990 Outdoor	Phillip Greyling	1500 meters	6th	
Women's	1990 Outdoor	Lisa Dillard	100 meters	4th	
Women's	1990 Outdoor	Lisa Dillard	200 meters	7th	
Men's	1991 Indoor	James Trapp	55 meters	5th	
Women's	1991 Indoor	Ane Skak	800 meters	6th	
Men's	1991 Outdoor	James Trapp	100 meters	4th	
Men's	1991 Outdoor	Michael Green	100 meters	5th	
Men's	1991 Outdoor	Doug Thomas	4 × 100 meters relay	2nd	
Men's	1991 Outdoor	Michael Green	4 × 100 meters relay	2nd	
Men's	1991 Outdoor	Larry Ryans	4 × 100 meters relay	2nd	
Men's	1991 Outdoor	James Trapp	4 × 100 meters relay	2nd	
Women's	1991 Outdoor	Kim Graham	200 meters	4th	
Women's	1991 Outdoor	Ane Skak	800 meters	6th	
Women's	1991 Outdoor	Mareike Ressing	3000 meters	4th	
Women's	1991 Outdoor	Lisa Dillard	4 × 100 meters relay	5th	
Women's	1991 Outdoor	Tara Henderson	4 × 100 meters relay	5th	
Women's	1991 Outdoor	Angel Fleetwood	4 × 100 meters relay	5th	
Women's	1991 Outdoor	Kim Graham	4 × 100 meters relay	5th	
Men's	1992 Indoor	Michael Green	55 meters	1st	
Men's	1992 Indoor	Michael Green	55 meters	1st	
Men's	1992 Indoor	James Trapp	55 meters	4th	
Men's	1992 Indoor	Anthony Knight	55 meters hurdles	3rd	
Men's	1992 Indoor	Larry Ryans	55 meters hurdles	5th	
Men's	1992 Indoor	James Trapp	200 meters	1st	
Men's	1992 Indoor	Wesley Russell	400 meters	3rd	
Men's	1992 Indoor	Andrew Beecher	800 meters	5th	
Men's	1992 Indoor	Cormac Finnerty	3000 meters	3rd	
Women's	1992 Indoor	Karen Hartmann	800 meters	3rd	
Women's	1992 Indoor	Nanette Holloway	Triple jump	5th	
Men's	1992 Outdoor	James Trapp	100 meters	3rd	
Men's	1992 Outdoor	James Trapp	200 meters	4th	
Men's	1992 Outdoor	Cormac Finnerty	5000 meters	4th	
Men's	1992 Outdoor	Michael Wheatley	4 × 100 meters relay	6th	
Men's	1992 Outdoor	Wesley Russell	4 × 100 meters relay	6th	
Men's	1992 Outdoor	Trevor Gilbert	4 × 100 meters relay	6th	
Men's	1992 Outdoor	James Trapp	4 × 100 meters relay	6th	
Women's	1992 Outdoor	Karen Hartmann	1500 meters	6th	
Women's	1992 Outdoor	Nanette Holloway	Triple jump	6th	
Women's	1992 Outdoor	Angela Dolby	Shot put	8th	
Men's	1993 Indoor	Michael Green	55 meters	1st	
Men's	1993 Indoor	Duane Ross	55 meters hurdles	4th	
Men's	1993 Indoor	Wesley Russell	400 meters	1st	
Men's	1993 Indoor	Cormac Finnerty	3000 meters	3rd	
Women's	1993 Indoor	Monyetta Haynesworth	Long jump	5th	
Women's	1993 Indoor	Tonya McKelvey	Long jump	6th	
Men's	1993 Outdoor	Michael Green	100 meters	1st	
Men's	1993 Outdoor	Anthony Knight	110 meters hurdles	4th	
Men's	1993 Outdoor	Duane Ross	110 meters hurdles	7th	
Men's	1993 Outdoor	Cormac Finnerty	5000 meters	7th	
Men's	1993 Outdoor	Michael Wheatley	4 × 100 meters relay	5th	
Men's	1993 Outdoor	Enaynt Oliver	4 × 100 meters relay	5th	
Men's	1993 Outdoor	Trevor Gilbert	4 × 100 meters relay	5th	
Men's	1993 Outdoor	Michael Green	4 × 100 meters relay	5th	
Women's	1993 Outdoor	Kim Graham	200 meters	4th	
Women's	1993 Outdoor	Mareike Ressing	3000 meters	6th	
Men's	1994 Indoor	Duane Ross	55 meters hurdles	3rd	
Men's	1994 Indoor	Mitchel Francis	4 × 400 meters relay	7th	
Men's	1994 Indoor	Enayat Oliver	4 × 400 meters relay	7th	
Men's	1994 Indoor	Clarence Richards	4 × 400 meters relay	7th	
Men's	1994 Indoor	Kendrick Roach	4 × 400 meters relay	7th	
Women's	1994 Indoor	Mareike Ressing	3000 meters	3rd	
Men's	1994 Outdoor	Larry Ryans	110 meters hurdles	6th	
Men's	1994 Outdoor	Duane Ross	110 meters hurdles	7th	
Men's	1994 Outdoor	Tony Wheeler	200 meters	3rd	
Men's	1994 Outdoor	Mitchel Francis	400 meters hurdles	2nd	
Men's	1995 Indoor	Duane Ross	55 meters hurdles	5th	
Men's	1995 Indoor	Tony Wheeler	200 meters	3rd	
Men's	1995 Indoor	Clarence Richards	400 meters	6th	
Men's	1995 Indoor	Davidson Gill	4 × 400 meters relay	5th	
Men's	1995 Indoor	Clarence Richards	4 × 400 meters relay	5th	
Men's	1995 Indoor	Mitchel Francis	4 × 400 meters relay	5th	
Men's	1995 Indoor	Enaynt Oliver	4 × 400 meters relay	5th	
Men's	1995 Indoor	John Thorp	High jump	7th	
Men's	1995 Outdoor	Duane Ross	110 meters hurdles	1st	
Men's	1995 Outdoor	Tony Wheeler	200 meters	6th	
Men's	1995 Outdoor	Mitchel Francis	400 meters hurdles	5th	
Men's	1995 Outdoor	Duane Ross	4 × 100 meters relay	5th	
Men's	1995 Outdoor	Tony Wheeler	4 × 100 meters relay	5th	
Men's	1995 Outdoor	Carlton Chambers	4 × 100 meters relay	5th	
Men's	1995 Outdoor	Enayat Oliver	4 × 100 meters relay	5th	
Men's	1995 Outdoor	John Thorp	High jump	5th	
Women's	1996 Indoor	Treshell Mayo	200 meters	5th	
Men's	1996 Outdoor	Carlton Chambers	100 meters	4th	
Men's	1996 Outdoor	Jeremichael Williams	110 meters hurdles	7th	
Men's	1996 Outdoor	Tony Wheeler	200 meters	3rd	
Men's	1996 Outdoor	Carlton Chambers	200 meters	6th	
Men's	1996 Outdoor	Greg Hines	4 × 400 meters relay	8th	
Men's	1996 Outdoor	Shawn Thomas	4 × 400 meters relay	8th	
Men's	1996 Outdoor	Aaron Haynes	4 × 400 meters relay	8th	
Men's	1996 Outdoor	Tony Wheeler	4 × 400 meters relay	8th	
Women's	1996 Outdoor	Treshell Mayo	200 meters	6th	
Men's	1997 Indoor	Jeremichael Williams	55 meters hurdles	2nd	
Men's	1997 Outdoor	Carlton Chambers	100 meters	4th	
Men's	1997 Outdoor	Jeremichael Williams	110 meters hurdles	7th	
Men's	1997 Outdoor	Jeremichael Williams	4 × 100 meters relay	2nd	
Men's	1997 Outdoor	Tony Wheeler	4 × 100 meters relay	2nd	
Men's	1997 Outdoor	Carlton Chambers	4 × 100 meters relay	2nd	
Men's	1997 Outdoor	Charles Allen	4 × 100 meters relay	2nd	
Women's	1997 Outdoor	Shenita Wilson	4 × 400 meters relay	4th	
Women's	1997 Outdoor	Kim Norsworthy	4 × 400 meters relay	4th	
Women's	1997 Outdoor	Samantha Watt	4 × 400 meters relay	4th	
Women's	1997 Outdoor	Shekera Wilson	4 × 400 meters relay	4th	
Men's	1998 Indoor	Jeremichael Williams	55 meters hurdles	2nd	
Men's	1998 Indoor	Greg Hines	55 meters hurdles	7th	
Men's	1998 Indoor	Shawn Crawford	200 meters	1st	
Men's	1998 Indoor	Charles Allen	4 × 400 meters relay	3rd	
Men's	1998 Indoor	Davidson Gill	4 × 400 meters relay	3rd	
Men's	1998 Indoor	Aaron Haynes	4 × 400 meters relay	3rd	
Men's	1998 Indoor	Kenny Franklin	4 × 400 meters relay	3rd	
Women's	1998 Indoor	Nikkie Bouyer	55 meters hurdles	6th	
Women's	1998 Indoor	Lashonda Cutchin	4 × 400 meters relay	6th	
Women's	1998 Indoor	Samantha Watt	4 × 400 meters relay	6th	
Women's	1998 Indoor	Nikkie Bouyer	4 × 400 meters relay	6th	
Women's	1998 Indoor	Shekera Weston	4 × 400 meters relay	6th	
Men's	1998 Outdoor	Shawn Crawford	100 meters	8th	
Men's	1998 Outdoor	Jeremichael Williams	110 meters hurdles	4th	
Men's	1998 Outdoor	Greg Hines	110 meters hurdles	7th	
Men's	1998 Outdoor	Shawn Crawford	200 meters	3rd	
Men's	1998 Outdoor	Greg Hines	400 meters hurdles	5th	
Men's	1998 Outdoor	Carlton Chambers	4 × 100 meters relay	5th	
Men's	1998 Outdoor	Shawn Crawford	4 × 100 meters relay	5th	
Men's	1998 Outdoor	Jeremichael Williams	4 × 100 meters relay	5th	
Men's	1998 Outdoor	Kenny Franklin	4 × 100 meters relay	5th	
Men's	1999 Indoor	Sultan Tucker	60 meters hurdles	6th	
Men's	1999 Indoor	Shawn Crawford	200 meters	4th	
Men's	1999 Indoor	Ato Modibo	400 meters	1st	
Men's	1999 Indoor	Charles Allen	4 × 400 meters relay	1st	
Men's	1999 Indoor	Kenny Franklin	4 × 400 meters relay	1st	
Men's	1999 Indoor	Davidson Gill	4 × 400 meters relay	1st	
Men's	1999 Indoor	Ato Modibo	4 × 400 meters relay	1st	
Men's	1999 Outdoor	Shawn Crawford	200 meters	6th	
Men's	1999 Outdoor	Ato Modibo	400 meters	5th	
Men's	1999 Outdoor	Davidson Gill	800 meters	8th	
Men's	1999 Outdoor	Charles Allen	4 × 100 meters relay	5th	
Men's	1999 Outdoor	Kenny Franklin	4 × 100 meters relay	5th	
Men's	1999 Outdoor	Anthony Moorman	4 × 100 meters relay	5th	
Men's	1999 Outdoor	Shawn Crawford	4 × 100 meters relay	5th	
Men's	1999 Outdoor	Kai Maull	Long jump	8th	
Women's	1999 Outdoor	Shekera Weston	200 meters	7th	
Women's	1999 Outdoor	Nikkie Bouyer	400 meters hurdles	6th	
Women's	1999 Outdoor	Simone Brown	4 × 100 meters relay	7th	
Women's	1999 Outdoor	Shekera Weston	4 × 100 meters relay	7th	
Women's	1999 Outdoor	Lashonda Cutchin	4 × 100 meters relay	7th	
Women's	1999 Outdoor	Nikkie Bouyer	4 × 100 meters relay	7th	
Men's	2000 Indoor	Shawn Crawford	60 meters	4th	
Men's	2000 Indoor	Sultan Tucker	60 meters hurdles	8th	
Men's	2000 Indoor	Shawn Crawford	200 meters	1st	
Men's	2000 Outdoor	Shawn Crawford	100 meters	6th	
Men's	2000 Outdoor	Todd Matthews	110 meters hurdles	3rd	
Men's	2000 Outdoor	Shawn Crawford	200 meters	1st	
Men's	2000 Outdoor	Fred Sharpe	400 meters hurdles	7th	
Men's	2001 Indoor	Sultan Tucker	60 meters hurdles	3rd	
Men's	2001 Indoor	Todd Matthews	60 meters hurdles	5th	
Women's	2001 Indoor	Cydonie Mothersille	200 meters	1st	
Women's	2001 Indoor	Michelle Burgher	4 × 400 meters relay	3rd	
Women's	2001 Indoor	Cydonie Mothersille	4 × 400 meters relay	3rd	
Women's	2001 Indoor	Marcia Smith	4 × 400 meters relay	3rd	
Women's	2001 Indoor	Shekera Weston	4 × 400 meters relay	3rd	
Women's	2001 Indoor	Jamine Moton	Shot put	2nd	
Women's	2001 Indoor	Jamine Moton	Weight throw	3rd	
Men's	2001 Outdoor	Ato Modibo	400 meters	8th	
Men's	2001 Outdoor	Andy Giesler	Decathlon	7th	
Women's	2001 Outdoor	Shekera Weston	200 meters	4th	
Women's	2001 Outdoor	Shannon Murray	4 × 100 meters relay	4th	
Women's	2001 Outdoor	Shekera Weston	4 × 100 meters relay	4th	
Women's	2001 Outdoor	Michelle Burgher	4 × 100 meters relay	4th	
Women's	2001 Outdoor	Cydonie Mothersille	4 × 100 meters relay	4th	
Women's	2001 Outdoor	Michelle Burgher	4 × 400 meters relay	1st	
Women's	2001 Outdoor	Cydonie Mothersille	4 × 400 meters relay	1st	
Women's	2001 Outdoor	Marcia Smith	4 × 400 meters relay	1st	
Women's	2001 Outdoor	Shekera Weston	4 × 400 meters relay	1st	
Women's	2001 Outdoor	Jamine Moton	Shot put	2nd	
Men's	2002 Indoor	Dwight Thomas	60 meters	6th	
Men's	2002 Indoor	Todd Matthews	60 meters hurdles	4th	
Men's	2002 Indoor	Ato Modibo	400 meters	5th	
Men's	2002 Indoor	Doug Ameigh	High jump	4th	
Women's	2002 Indoor	Sheri Smith	Triple jump	7th	
Women's	2002 Indoor	Jamine Moton	Shot put	8th	
Women's	2002 Indoor	Jamine Moton	Weight throw	2nd	
Men's	2002 Outdoor	Dwight Thomas	100 meters	2nd	
Men's	2002 Outdoor	Todd Matthews	110 meters hurdles	2nd	
Men's	2002 Outdoor	Dwight Thomas	200 meters	2nd	
Men's	2002 Outdoor	Airese Currie	4 × 100 meters relay	2nd	
Men's	2002 Outdoor	Otto Spain	4 × 100 meters relay	2nd	
Men's	2002 Outdoor	Jacey Harper	4 × 100 meters relay	2nd	
Men's	2002 Outdoor	Dwight Thomas	4 × 100 meters relay	2nd	
Women's	2002 Outdoor	Gisele de Oliveira	Triple jump	7th	
Women's	2002 Outdoor	Jamine Moton	Hammer throw	1st	
Men's	2003 Indoor	Larry Griffin	60 meters	7th	
Men's	2003 Indoor	Jacey Harper	4 × 400 meters relay	7th	
Men's	2003 Indoor	Michael Bolling	4 × 400 meters relay	7th	
Men's	2003 Indoor	Roy Cheney	4 × 400 meters relay	7th	
Men's	2003 Indoor	Otto Spain	4 × 400 meters relay	7th	
Men's	2003 Indoor	Terrance McDaniel	High jump	5th	
Men's	2003 Outdoor	Itay Magidi	3000 meters steeplechase	8th	
Women's	2003 Outdoor	Gisele de Oliveira	Long jump	8th	
Women's	2003 Outdoor	Gisele de Oliveira	Triple jump	3rd	
Men's	2004 Indoor	George Kitchens	Long jump	7th	
Women's	2004 Indoor	Silja Ulfarsdottir	4 × 400 meters relay	8th	
Women's	2004 Indoor	Shakirah Rutherford	4 × 400 meters relay	8th	
Women's	2004 Indoor	Christina Smith	4 × 400 meters relay	8th	
Women's	2004 Indoor	Randi Hinton	4 × 400 meters relay	8th	
Men's	2004 Outdoor	George Kitchens	Long jump	8th	
Women's	2004 Outdoor	Gisele de Oliveira	Triple jump	3rd	
Men's	2005 Indoor	George Kitchens	Long jump	7th	
Women's	2005 Indoor	Gisele Oliveira	Triple jump	1st	
Men's	2005 Outdoor	Ron Richards	100 meters	5th	
Men's	2005 Outdoor	Itay Magidi	3000 meters steeplechase	7th	
Women's	2005 Outdoor	Gisele de Oliveira	Triple jump	2nd	
Men's	2006 Indoor	Mitch Greeley	Pole vault	8th	
Men's	2006 Outdoor	Travis Padgett	100 meters	4th	
Men's	2006 Outdoor	Jason Bell	Triple jump	6th	
Men's	2006 Outdoor	Ryan Koontz	Decathlon	7th	
Men's	2007 Indoor	Travis Padgett	60 meters	1st	
Men's	2007 Indoor	Jacoby Ford	60 meters	3rd	
Men's	2007 Indoor	Ryan Koontz	Heptathlon	7th	
Women's	2007 Indoor	Della Clark	Weight throw	3rd	
Men's	2007 Outdoor	Travis Padgett	100 meters	3rd	
Men's	2007 Outdoor	Travis Padgett	4 × 100 meters relay	7th	
Men's	2007 Outdoor	Corey Brown	4 × 100 meters relay	7th	
Men's	2007 Outdoor	Cowin Mills	4 × 100 meters relay	7th	
Men's	2007 Outdoor	C.J. Spiller	4 × 100 meters relay	7th	
Men's	2007 Outdoor	Mitch Greeley	Pole vault	4th	
Men's	2008 Indoor	Travis Padgett	60 meters	3rd	
Men's	2008 Indoor	Mitch Greeley	Pole vault	2nd	
Men's	2008 Outdoor	Travis Padgett	100 meters	2nd	
Men's	2008 Outdoor	Jacoby Ford	100 meters	5th	
Men's	2009 Indoor	Jacoby Ford	60 meters	1st	
Women's	2009 Indoor	Liane Weber	Pentathlon	6th	
Men's	2009 Outdoor	Justin Murdock	4 × 100 meters relay	3rd	
Men's	2009 Outdoor	C. J. Spiller	4 × 100 meters relay	3rd	
Men's	2009 Outdoor	Trenton Guy	4 × 100 meters relay	3rd	
Men's	2009 Outdoor	Jacoby Ford	4 × 100 meters relay	3rd	
Men's	2010 Indoor	Spencer Adams	60 meters hurdles	8th	
Men's	2010 Indoor	Miller Moss	Heptathlon	8th	
Women's	2010 Indoor	Kimberly Ruck	5000 meters	7th	
Women's	2010 Indoor	Brittany Pringley	4 × 400 meters relay	5th	
Women's	2010 Indoor	Brianna Rollins	4 × 400 meters relay	5th	
Women's	2010 Indoor	Sonni Austin	4 × 400 meters relay	5th	
Women's	2010 Indoor	Jasmine Edgerson	4 × 400 meters relay	5th	
Women's	2010 Indoor	Patrícia Mamona	Triple jump	2nd	
Women's	2010 Indoor	April Sinkler	Triple jump	7th	
Women's	2010 Indoor	Liane Weber	Pentathlon	5th	
Women's	2010 Outdoor	Michaylin Golladay	4 × 100 meters relay	4th	
Women's	2010 Outdoor	Stormy Kendrick	4 × 100 meters relay	4th	
Women's	2010 Outdoor	Kristine Scott	4 × 100 meters relay	4th	
Women's	2010 Outdoor	Jasmine Edgerson	4 × 100 meters relay	4th	
Women's	2010 Outdoor	Patrícia Mamona	Triple jump	1st	
Men's	2011 Indoor	Miller Moss	Heptathlon	1st	
Women's	2011 Indoor	Brianna Rollins	60 meters hurdles	1st	
Women's	2011 Indoor	Marlena Wesh	400 meters	8th	
Women's	2011 Indoor	April Sinkler	Triple jump	2nd	
Men's	2011 Outdoor	Miller Moss	Decathlon	3rd	
Women's	2011 Outdoor	Michaylin Golladay	100 meters hurdles	7th	
Women's	2011 Outdoor	Alyssa Kulik	3000 meters steeplechase	4th	
Women's	2011 Outdoor	Michaylin Golladay	4 × 100 meters relay	7th	
Women's	2011 Outdoor	Monique Gracia	4 × 100 meters relay	7th	
Women's	2011 Outdoor	Misha Morris	4 × 100 meters relay	7th	
Women's	2011 Outdoor	Jasmine Edgerson	4 × 100 meters relay	7th	
Women's	2011 Outdoor	April Sinkler	Long jump	8th	
Women's	2011 Outdoor	Patrícia Mamona	Triple jump	1st	
Women's	2011 Outdoor	Liane Weber	Heptathlon	2nd	
Men's	2012 Indoor	Spencer Adams	60 meters hurdles	5th	
Women's	2012 Indoor	Dezerea Bryant	60 meters	6th	
Women's	2012 Indoor	Brianna Rollins	60 meters hurdles	2nd	
Women's	2012 Indoor	Bridgette Owens	60 meters hurdles	3rd	
Women's	2012 Indoor	Dezerea Bryant	200 meters	7th	
Women's	2012 Indoor	Marlena Wesh	400 meters	5th	
Women's	2012 Indoor	Jasmine Brunson	Triple jump	8th	
Men's	2012 Outdoor	Spencer Adams	110 meters hurdles	3rd	
Women's	2012 Outdoor	Brianna Rollins	100 meters hurdles	2nd	
Women's	2012 Outdoor	Bridgette Owens	100 meters hurdles	3rd	
Women's	2012 Outdoor	Marlena Wesh	400 meters	6th	
Women's	2012 Outdoor	Alyssa Kulik	3000 meters steeplechase	7th	
Women's	2012 Outdoor	Stormy Kendrick	4 × 100 meters relay	3rd	
Women's	2012 Outdoor	Marlena Wesh	4 × 100 meters relay	3rd	
Women's	2012 Outdoor	Dezerea Bryant	4 × 100 meters relay	3rd	
Women's	2012 Outdoor	Jasmine Edgerson	4 × 100 meters relay	3rd	
Women's	2012 Outdoor	April Sinkler	Triple jump	6th	
Men's	2013 Indoor	Tevin Hester	60 meters	7th	
Men's	2013 Indoor	Spencer Adams	60 meters hurdles	3rd	
Women's	2013 Indoor	Dezerea Bryant	60 meters	4th	
Women's	2013 Indoor	Stormy Kendrick	60 meters	6th	
Women's	2013 Indoor	Brianna Rollins	60 meters hurdles	1st	
Women's	2013 Indoor	Dezerea Bryant	200 meters	5th	
Women's	2013 Indoor	Brittney Waller	Weight throw	3rd	
Men's	2013 Outdoor	Reggie Lewis	100 meters	8th	
Men's	2013 Outdoor	Spencer Adams	110 meters hurdles	3rd	
Women's	2013 Outdoor	Brianna Rollins	100 meters hurdles	1st	
Women's	2013 Outdoor	Keni Harrison	100 meters hurdles	5th	
Women's	2013 Outdoor	Dezerea Bryant	200 meters	5th	
Women's	2013 Outdoor	Keni Harrison	400 meters hurdles	4th	
Women's	2013 Outdoor	Kendra Harrison	4 × 100 meters relay	3rd	
Women's	2013 Outdoor	Brianna Rollins	4 × 100 meters relay	3rd	
Women's	2013 Outdoor	Stormy Kendrick	4 × 100 meters relay	3rd	
Women's	2013 Outdoor	Dezerea Bryant	4 × 100 meters relay	3rd	
Men's	2014 Indoor	Tevin Hester	60 meters	7th	
Women's	2014 Indoor	Mimi Land	High jump	5th	
Men's	2015 Indoor	Tevin Hester	60 meters	7th	
Men's	2015 Indoor	Tevin Hester	200 meters	6th	
Women's	2015 Indoor	Natoya Goule-Toppin	800 meters	1st	
Women's	2015 Indoor	Olivia James	4 × 400 meters relay	4th	
Women's	2015 Indoor	Nia Fluker	4 × 400 meters relay	4th	
Women's	2015 Indoor	Deja Parrish	4 × 400 meters relay	4th	
Women's	2015 Indoor	Natoya Goule	4 × 400 meters relay	4th	
Men's	2015 Outdoor	Tevin Hester	100 meters	6th	
Men's	2015 Outdoor	Justin Johnson	110 meters hurdles	7th	
Men's	2015 Outdoor	Tevin Hester	200 meters	6th	
Women's	2015 Outdoor	Natoya Goule-Toppin	800 meters	6th	
Men's	2016 Indoor	Tevin Hester	60 meters	6th	
Men's	2016 Indoor	Tevin Hester	200 meters	5th	
Women's	2016 Indoor	Kaley Ciluffo	Distance medley relay	8th	
Women's	2016 Indoor	Deja Parrish	Distance medley relay	8th	
Women's	2016 Indoor	Ersula Farrow	Distance medley relay	8th	
Women's	2016 Indoor	Grace Barnett	Distance medley relay	8th	
Men's	2016 Outdoor	Tevin Hester	200 meters	6th	
Men's	2016 Outdoor	Cordell Lamb	4 × 400 meters relay	5th	
Men's	2016 Outdoor	Michael Cheeks	4 × 400 meters relay	5th	
Men's	2016 Outdoor	Jorel Bellafonte	4 × 400 meters relay	5th	
Men's	2016 Outdoor	Jeffrey Green	4 × 400 meters relay	5th	
Men's	2017 Outdoor	Chris McBride	Long jump	5th	
Women's	2017 Outdoor	Ranee Ricketts	4 × 100 meters relay	5th	
Women's	2017 Outdoor	Rebekah Smith	4 × 100 meters relay	5th	
Women's	2017 Outdoor	Sabria Hadley	4 × 100 meters relay	5th	
Women's	2017 Outdoor	Torie Robinson	4 × 100 meters relay	5th	
Men's	2018 Indoor	John Lewis	800 meters	7th	
Men's	2021 Indoor	Terryon Conwell	200 meters	7th	
Women's	2021 Indoor	Trishauna Hemmings	60 meters hurdles	8th	
Women's	2021 Indoor	Laurie Barton	800 meters	2nd	
Men's	2021 Outdoor	Giano Roberts	110 meters hurdles	7th	
Men's	2021 Outdoor	Giano Roberts	4 × 100 meters relay	5th	
Men's	2021 Outdoor	Marcus Parker	4 × 100 meters relay	5th	
Men's	2021 Outdoor	Alex Sands	4 × 100 meters relay	5th	
Men's	2021 Outdoor	Terryon Conwell	4 × 100 meters relay	5th	
Men's	2021 Outdoor	Roje Stona	Discus throw	2nd	
Women's	2021 Outdoor	Laurie Barton	800 meters	2nd	
Men's	2022 Outdoor	Giano Roberts	110 meters hurdles	4th	
Men's	2022 Outdoor	LaFranz Campbell	110 meters hurdles	5th	
Men's	2023 Indoor	Giano Roberts	60 meters hurdles	1st	
Men's	2023 Indoor	Tarees Rhoden	800 meters	4th	
Women's	2023 Indoor	Kiara Grant	60 meters	8th	
Women's	2023 Indoor	Marie Forbes	Weight throw	6th	
Men's	2023 Outdoor	Giano Roberts	110 meters hurdles	5th	
Women's	2023 Outdoor	Lashanna Graham	400 meters hurdles	6th	
Men's	2024 Indoor	Tarees Rhoden	800 meters	5th	
Women's	2024 Indoor	Marie Forbes	Weight throw	5th	
Men's	2024 Outdoor	Tarees Rhoden	800 meters	4th	
Men's	2024 Outdoor	Courtney Lawrence	Shot put	5th	

== See also ==
- Category:Clemson Tigers men's track and field athletes (38)
- Category:Clemson Tigers women's track and field athletes (17)
