= Anthony Knight =

Jamaican hurdler

Personal information
- Full name: Anthony McConnor Knight
- Nationality: Jamaican
- Born: 17 November 1970 (age 55)

Sport
- Sport: Track and field
- Event: 110 metres hurdles

Anthony McConnor Knight (born 17 November 1970) is a Jamaican hurdler. He competed in the men's 110 metres hurdles at the 1992 Summer Olympics.

Competing for the Clemson Tigers track and field team, Knight finished 3rd in the 55 m hurdles at the 1992 NCAA Division I Indoor Track and Field Championships.
