= Patience Itanyi =

Nigerian long jumper

Personal information
- Nationality: Nigerian
- Born: 2 July 1973 (age 53)

Sport
- Sport: Athletics
- Event: Long jump
- College team: Alabama A&M Lady Bulldogs; West Virginia Mountaineers
Medal record
Women's athletics
Representing Nigeria
African Championships
Gold medal – first place	1998 Dakar	Heptathlon
Bronze medal – third place	2000 Algiers	Heptathlon
Summer Universiade
Bronze medal – third place	1995 Fukuoka	4 × 100 m relay
African Games
Bronze medal – third place	1995 Harare	Long jump
Silver medal – second place	1999 Johannesburg	Heptathlon

Patience "Pat" Itanyi (born 2 July 1973) is a Nigerian athlete. She competed in the women's long jump at the 2000 Summer Olympics.

== Career ==
Itanyi competed for both the Alabama A&M Bulldogs and West Virginia Mountaineers track and field teams in the NCAA. She won the 1995 long jump at the NCAA Division I Outdoor Track and Field Championships for West Virginia.

Representing Nigeria, she won bronze medals in the long jump at the 1995 African Games and 4 × 100 m relay at the 1995 Summer Universiade. In combined athletics events, she won the gold medal at the 1998 African Championships heptathlon and was runner-up at the 1999 African Games before winning bronze at the 2000 African Championships.
