= 1000 yards at the NCAA Division I Indoor Track and Field Championships =

This is a list of the NCAA Division I indoor champions in the 1000 yards or its metric equivalent 1000 meters. The imperial distance was contested until 1983, while the 1000 meters was run for 4 years from 1984 to 1987 before the event was discontinued. In 1986 and 1987, the 1/10-mile track in Oklahoma City was short by 25 inches (640 mm) per lap, causing the actual race distance to be less than 1000 meters. Hand timing was used until 1975, while starting in 1976 fully automatic timing was used.

== Winners ==
=== Women ===
Women's 1000 yd / 1000 m winners
Year	Athlete	Team	Time
1983	Tina Krebs	Clemson Tigers	2:28.58 y
1984	Joetta Clark	Tennessee Volunteers	2:43.85
1985	Christine Slythe	LSU Lady Tigers	2:42.23
1986	Karol Davidson	Texas Longhorns	2:42.68
1987	Trena Hull	UNLV Rebels	2:41.08

=== Men ===
Key
y=yards
w=wind aided
A=Altitude assisted

==== 1000 yards ====
Year	Name, (Country)	Team	Time
1965	Robin Lingle	Missouri	2:08.9y
1966	Herb Germann	Seton Hall	2:12.9y
1967	Ray Arrington	Wisconsin	2:07.8y
1968	Ray Arrington	Wisconsin	2:09.3y
1969	Ray Arrington	Wisconsin	2:08.0y
1970	Keith Colburn	Harvard	2:09.9y
1971	Bob Wheeler	Duke	2:07.4y
1972	Morgan Mosser	West Virginia	2:08.9y
1973	Tony Waldrop	North Carolina	2:10.0y
1974	Wesley Maiyo Kenya	Wyoming	2:08.1y
1975	Keith Francis	Boston Coll	2:08.4y
1976	Mark Belger	Villanova	2:07.29y
1977	Kelley Marsh	Ball State	2:07.89y
1978	Don Paige	Villanova	2:07.88y
1979	Don Paige	Villanova	2:07.27y
1980	Don Paige	Villanova	2:05.80y
1981	Peter Lemashon Kenya	UTEP	2:12.29y
1982	Randy Stephens	Arkansas	2:07.37y
1983	Edwin Koech Kenya	Richmond	2:08.59y

==== 1000 meters ====
Year	Name, (Country)	Team	Time
1984	William Wuycke Venezuela	Alabama	2:24.27
1985	Herb Gawain Guyana	Rice	2:22.01
1986	Freddie Williams South Africa	Abilene Christian	2:18.74†
1987	Rob van Helden Netherlands	Louisiana St	2:20.51†
