= Matthew Mileham =

British hammer thrower (born 1956)

Matt Mileham
Personal information
- Born: 27 December 1956 (age 69) Hackney, London, England
- Height: 188 cm (6 ft 2 in)
- Weight: 109 kg (240 lb)

Sport
- Sport: Athletics
- Event: hammer throw
- Club: Haringey AC

Matthew David Mileham (born 27 December 1956) is a British retired hammer thrower. He represented Great Britain at two consecutive Summer Olympics, starting in Los Angeles in 1984 and the 1988 Summer Olympics.

== Biography ==
Mileham finished second behind Australian Peter Farmer at the 1979 AAA Championships but by virtue of being the highest placed British athlete was considered the British hammer throw champion

Mileham was an NCAA champion thrower for the Fresno State Bulldogs track and fieldm team, winning the hammer throw at the 1984 NCAA Division I Outdoor Track and Field Championships. He was also an All-American weight thrower.

Mileham finished runner-up twice more at the AAAs in 1982 and 1986 and represented England in the hammer event, at the 1986 Commonwealth Games in Edinburgh, Scotland.

== Personal life ==
A student at California State University, Fresno he later worked as an electrical engineer. He was married to Olympian discus thrower Dr. Lacy Barnes-Mileham until they divorced in October 2009. Dr. Lacy Barnes-Mileham also attended Fresno State and was a discus thrower at the 1996 Summer Olympics in Atlanta, Georgia.

== Achievements ==
Year	Competition	Venue	Position	Notes
Representing Great Britain and England
1983	World Championships	Helsinki, Finland	22nd	67.12 m
1984	Olympic Games	Los Angeles, United States	—	NM
1986	Commonwealth Games	Edinburgh, Scotland	6th	67.96 m
1988	Olympic Games	Seoul, South Korea	28th	62.42 m
