= NCAA Division I Men's Indoor Track and Field Championships =

American collegiate track and field tournament

- Current season, competition or edition: 2026 NCAA Division I Indoor Track and Field Championships
- Association: NCAA
- Sport: College indoor track and field
- Founded: 1965; 61 years ago
- Division: Division I
- Country: United States
- Most recent champion: Arkansas (22nd)
- Most titles: Team: Arkansas (22); Individual: Arkansas (56)
- Broadcaster: ESPNU
- Website: NCAA.com

The NCAA Men's Division I Indoor Track and Field Championship is an annual collegiate indoor track and field competition for men organised by the National Collegiate Athletic Association. The first edition of the championship was held in 1965, and it has been held every year since except for 2020.

Athlete's individual performances earn points for their institution and the team with the most points receives the NCAA team title in track and field. A separate NCAA Division I women's competition is also held. These two events are separate from the NCAA Men's Division I Outdoor Track and Field Championships and NCAA Women's Division I Outdoor Track and Field Championships held during the spring.

The current team champions are Arkansas, who won their 22nd title in 2026.

Arkansas have been the most successful program, with 22 team national titles.

== Events ==
=== Track events ===
- Sprint events
  - 60 meter dash (1999–present)
  - 200 meter dash (1988–present)
  - 400 meter dash (1984–present)
- Distance events
  - 800 meter run (1965–present)
  - Mile run (1965–present)
  - 3,000 meter run (1965–present)
  - 5,000 meter run (1989–present)
- Hurdle Events
  - 60 meter hurdles (1999–present)
- Relay events
  - 1,600 meter relay (1965–present)
  - Distance medley relay (1967–present)

=== Field events ===
- Jumping events
  - High jump (1965–present)
  - Pole vault (1965–present)
  - Long jump (1965–present)
  - Triple jump (1968–present)
- Throwing events
  - Shot put (1965–present)
  - Weight throw (1966–present)
- Multi-events
  - Heptathlon (2004–present)

=== Discontinued events ===
- Discontinued events
  - 60 yard dash (1965–1983)
  - 55 meter dash (1984–1998)
  - 55 meter high hurdles (1965–1998)
  - 440 yard dash (1965-1983)
  - 600 yard run (1965-1983)
  - 500 meter run (1984–1987)
  - 1,000 meter run (1965–1987)
  - Three-mile run (1974–1982)
  - 3,200 meter relay (1965–1993)

== Champions ==
NCAA Division I Men's Indoor Track and Field Championships
Year	Site	Venue	Team Championship			
Year	Site	Venue	Winner	Points	Runner-up	Points
1965; Details	Detroit	Cobo Arena	Missouri	14	Oklahoma State	12
1966; Details	Detroit	Cobo Arena	Kansas	14	USC	13
1967; Details	Detroit	Cobo Arena	USC	26	Oklahoma	12
1968; Details	Detroit	Cobo Arena	Villanova	35⅓	USC	25
1969; Details	Detroit	Cobo Arena	Kansas (2)	41½	Villanova	33
1970; Details	Detroit	Cobo Arena	Kansas (3)	27½	Villanova	26
1971; Details	Detroit	Cobo Arena	Villanova (2)	22	UTEP	19¼
1972; Details	Detroit	Cobo Arena	USC (2)	19	Bowling Green; Michigan State	18
1973; Details	Detroit	Cobo Arena	Manhattan	18	Kansas; Kent State; UTEP	12
1974; Details	Detroit	Cobo Arena	UTEP	19	Colorado	18
1975; Details	Detroit	Cobo Arena	UTEP (2)	36	Kansas	17.2
1976; Details	Detroit	Cobo Arena	UTEP (3)	23	Villanova	15
1977; Details	Detroit	Cobo Arena	Washington State	25½	UTEP	25
1978; Details	Detroit	Cobo Arena	UTEP (4)	44	Auburn	38
1979; Details	Detroit	Cobo Arena	Villanova (3)	52	UTEP	51
1980; Details	Detroit	Cobo Arena	UTEP (5)	76	Villanova	42
1981; Details	Detroit	Cobo Arena	UTEP (6)	76	SMU	51
1982; Details	Pontiac, Michigan	Pontiac Silverdome	UTEP (7)	67	Arkansas	30
1983; Details	Pontiac, Michigan	Pontiac Silverdome	SMU	43	Villanova	32
1984; Details	Syracuse, New York	Carrier Dome	Arkansas	38	Washington State	28
1985; Details	Syracuse, New York	Carrier Dome	Arkansas (2)	70	Tennessee	29
1986; Details	Oklahoma City	The Myriad	Arkansas (3)	49	Villanova	22
1987; Details	Oklahoma City	The Myriad	Arkansas (4)	39	SMU	31
1988; Details	Oklahoma City	The Myriad	Arkansas (5)	34	Illinois	29
1989; Details	Indianapolis	Hoosier Dome	Arkansas (6)	34	Florida	31
1990; Details	Indianapolis	Hoosier Dome	Arkansas (7)	44	Florida	29
1991; Details	Indianapolis	Hoosier Dome	Arkansas (8)	34	Georgetown	27
1992; Details	Indianapolis	Hoosier Dome	Arkansas (9)	53	Clemson	46
1993; Details	Indianapolis	Hoosier Dome	Arkansas (10)	66	Clemson	30
1994; Details	Indianapolis	RCA Dome	Arkansas (11)	94	Tennessee	40
1995; Details	Indianapolis	RCA Dome	Arkansas (12)	59	George Mason; Tennessee	26
1996; Details	Indianapolis	RCA Dome	George Mason	39	Nebraska	31½
1997; Details	Indianapolis	RCA Dome	Arkansas (13)	59	Auburn	27
1998; Details	Indianapolis	RCA Dome	Arkansas (14)	56	Stanford	36½
1999; Details	Indianapolis	RCA Dome	Arkansas (15)	65	Stanford	42½
2000; Details	Fayetteville, Arkansas	Randal Tyson Track Center	Arkansas (16)	69½	Stanford	52
2001; Details	Fayetteville, Arkansas	Randal Tyson Track Center	LSU	34	TCU	33
2002; Details	Fayetteville, Arkansas	Randal Tyson Track Center	Tennessee (2)	62½	Alabama	47
2003; Details	Fayetteville, Arkansas	Randal Tyson Track Center	Arkansas (17)	54	Auburn	30
2004; Details	Fayetteville, Arkansas	Randal Tyson Track Center	LSU (2)	44	Florida	38
2005; Details	Fayetteville, Arkansas	Randal Tyson Track Center	Arkansas (18)	56	Florida	46
2006; Details	Fayetteville, Arkansas	Randal Tyson Track Center	Arkansas (19)	53	LSU	41
2007; Details	Fayetteville, Arkansas	Randal Tyson Track Center	Wisconsin	40	Florida State	35
2008; Details	Fayetteville, Arkansas	Randal Tyson Track Center	Arizona State	44	Florida State	41
2009; Details	College Station, Texas	Gilliam Indoor Track Stadium	Oregon	54	Florida	36
2010; Details	Fayetteville, Arkansas	Randal Tyson Track Center	Florida	57	Oregon; Texas A&M	44
2011; Details	College Station, Texas	Gilliam Indoor Track Stadium	Florida (2)	52	Texas A&M	40
2012; Details	Nampa, Idaho	Ford Idaho Center	Florida (3)	52	Arkansas	47
2013; Details	Fayetteville, Arkansas	Randal Tyson Track Center	Arkansas (20)	74	Florida	59
2014; Details	Albuquerque, New Mexico	Albuquerque Convention Center	Oregon (2)	62	Arkansas	54
2015; Details	Fayetteville, Arkansas	Randal Tyson Track Center	Oregon (3)	74	Florida	50
2016; Details	Birmingham, Alabama	Birmingham CrossPlex	Oregon (4)	62	Arkansas	39
2017; Details	College Station, Texas	Gilliam Indoor Track Stadium	Texas A&M	46	Florida	45.5
2018; Details	College Station, Texas	Gilliam Indoor Track Stadium	Florida (4)	40	USC	37
2019; Details	Birmingham, Alabama	Birmingham CrossPlex	Florida (5)	55	Houston	44
2020; Details	Albuquerque, New Mexico	Albuquerque Convention Center	Not held due to the coronavirus pandemic			
2021; Details	Fayetteville, Arkansas	Randal Tyson Track Center	Oregon (5)	79	LSU	56
2022; Details	Birmingham, Alabama	Birmingham CrossPlex	Texas	47	North Carolina A&T	36
2023; Details	Albuquerque, New Mexico	Albuquerque Convention Center	Arkansas (21)	63	Georgia	38
2024; Details	Boston, Massachusetts	The Track at New Balance	Texas Tech	50.5	Arkansas	41
2025 Details	Virginia Beach, Virginia	Virginia Beach Sports Center	USC (3)	39	Georgia	33
2026 Details	Fayetteville, Arkansas	Randal Tyson Track Center	Arkansas (22)	73.5	Oregon	40

== future venues ==
- March 12–13, 2027: Randal Tyson Track Center in Fayetteville, Arkansas
- March 10–13, 2028: The TRACK at New Balance in Boston, Massachusetts

== Team titles ==
Team	Titles	Year Won
Arkansas	22	1984, 1985, 1986, 1987, 1988, 1989, 1990, 1991, 1992, 1993, 1994, 1995, 1997, 1998, 1999, 2000, 2003, 2005, 2006, 2013, 2023, 2026
UTEP	7	1974, 1975, 1976, 1978, 1980, 1981, 1982
Oregon	5	2009, 2014, 2015, 2016, 2021
Florida	5	2010, 2011, 2012, 2018, 2019
Kansas	3	1966, 1969, 1970,
USC	3	1967, 1972, 2025
Villanova	3	1968, 1971, 1979
LSU	2	2001, 2004
Missouri	1	1965
Manhattan	1	1973
Washington State	1	1977
SMU	1	1983
George Mason	1	1996
Tennessee	1	2002
Texas	1	2022
Wisconsin	1	2007
Arizona State	1	2008
Texas A&M	1	2017
Texas Tech	1	2024

== Championship records ==
Event	Record	Athlete	School	Nationality	Date	Championships	Place	Ref.
60 m	6.45	Christian Coleman	Tennessee	United States	11 March 2017	2017 Championships	College Station, Texas	
60 m	6.45	Kayinsola Ajayi	Auburn University	Nigeria	14 March 2026	2026 Championships	Fayetteville, Arkansas	
200 m	19.95	Garrett Kaalund	Southern California	United States	14 March 2026	2026 Championships	Fayetteville, Arkansas	
400 m	44.52	Michael Norman	Southern California	United States	10 March 2018	2018 Championships	College Station, Texas	
500 m	59.82	Roddie Haley	Arkansas	United States	15 March 1986	1986 Championships	Oklahoma City, Oklahoma	
800 m	1:45.15	Michael Saruni	UTEP	Kenya	10 March 2018	2018 Championships	College Station, Texas	
Mile	3:53.60	Abel Teffra	Georgetown	United States	15 March 2025	2025 Championships	Virginia Beach, Virginia	
3000 m	7:41.01	Nico Young	Northern Arizona	United States	9 March 2024	2024 Championships	Boston, Massachusetts	
5000 m	13:11.34	Brian Musau	Oklahoma State	Kenya	14 March 2025	2025 Championships	Virginia Beach, Virginia	
60 m hurdles	7.32	Ja'Kobe Tharp	Auburn University	United States	14 March 2026	2026 Championships	Fayetteville, Arkansas	
High jump	2.37 m	Hollis Conway	Louisiana Lafayette	United States	11 March 1989	1989 Championships	Indianapolis, Indiana	
Pole vault	6.00 m A	Sondre Guttormsen	Princeton	Norway	10 March 2023	2023 Championships	Albuquerque, New Mexico	
Long jump	8.48 m	Carl Lewis	Houston	United States	13 March 1981	1981 Championships	Detroit, Michigan	
Triple jump	17.54 m A	Jaydon Hibbert	Arkansas	Jamaica	11 March 2023	2023 Championships	Albuquerque, New Mexico	
Shot put	21.73 m	Ryan Whiting	Arizona	United States	14 March 2008	2008 Championships	Fayetteville, Arkansas	
Weight throw	25.64 m	Ryan Johnson	Iowa	United States	13 March 2026	2026 Championships	Fayetteville, Arkansas	
Heptathlon	6639 pts A	Kyle Garland	Georgia	United States	10–11 March 2023	2023 Championships	Albuquerque, New Mexico	
Heptathlon	60m / Long jump / Shot put / High jump / 60m H / Pole vault / 1000m; 6.87 / 7.96 m / 16.45 m / 2.12 m / 7.74 / 5.16 m / 2:41.36							
4 × 400 m relay	3:00.77	Zach Shinnick (46.24); Rai Benjamin (44.35); Ricky Morgan Jr. (45.67); Michael Norman (44.52)	Southern California	United States; Antigua and Barbuda; United States; United States	10 March 2018	2018 Championships	College Station, Texas	
Distance medley relay	9:15.12		Virginia Cavaliers		14 March 2025	2025 Championships	Virginia Beach, Virginia	

== See also ==
- NCAA Men's Indoor Track and Field Championships (Division II, Division III)
- NAIA Men's Indoor Track and Field Championship
- Pre-NCAA Outdoor Track and Field Champions
- NCAA Women's Indoor Track and Field Championships (Division I, Division II, Division III)
- NCAA Men's Outdoor Track and Field Championships (Division I, Division II, Division III)
- NCAA Women's Outdoor Track and Field Championships (Division I, Division II, Division III)
