= Jeff Lee (American football) =

American football player (born 1955)

No. 46
- Position: Wide receiver

Personal information
- Born: May 23, 1955 (age 71); Racine, Wisconsin, U.S.
- Listed height: 6 ft 2 in (1.88 m)
- Listed weight: 195 lb (88 kg)

Career information
- High school: William Horlick
- College: Nebraska
- NFL draft: 1979: undrafted

Career history
- St. Louis Cardinals (1979–1980); Chicago Bears (1981)*
- * Offseason or practice squad member only

Career NFL statistics
- Receptions: 2
- Receiving yards: 19
- Stats at Pro Football Reference

Jeffrey Leroy Lee (born May 23, 1955) is an American former wide receiver in the National Football League (NFL). He played with the St. Louis Cardinals during the 1980 NFL season. Mr. Jeff Lee is currently the Vice Principal in Bonifay, Florida's Holmes County High School. In addition to this, he is the head athletic director of the Holmes County High School Blue Devils. Holmes County Jeff Lee did not play at Nebraska.

Running for Nebraska, he was the 1977 NCAA Indoor Champion for 60 yard hurdles.
