= Larry Ryans =

American football player (born 1971)

No. 89, 80, 4
- Position: Wide receiver

Personal information
- Born: July 28, 1971 (age 55); Greenwood, South Carolina, U.S.
- Listed height: 5 ft 11 in (1.80 m)
- Listed weight: 182 lb (83 kg)

Career information
- High school: Greenwood
- College: Clemson
- NFL draft: 1993: undrafted
- Expansion draft: 1995: 24th round, 48th overall pick

Career history
- Detroit Lions (1993–1994); Carolina Panthers (1995)*; Tampa Bay Buccaneers (1996); New England Patriots (1997)*; Rhein Fire (1998–1999); Carolina Panthers (2000)*; Los Angeles Xtreme (2001)
- * Offseason or practice squad member only
- Stats at Pro Football Reference

Larry Ryans (born July 28, 1971) is an American former professional football player who was a wide receiver in the National Football League (NFL). He played for the Tampa Bay Buccaneers in 1996 and for the Los Angeles Xtreme in 2001.

Thomas played college football for the Clemson Tigers. He also competed on Clemson's track and field team as a sprinter, running the 3rd leg of their runner-up 4 × 100 m relay at the 1991 NCAA Division I Outdoor Track and Field Championships.
