= Lacy Barnes-Mileham =

American discus thrower

Personal information
- Born: 23 December 1964 (age 61) Ridgecrest, California, United States

Sport
- Sport: Track and field
- Club: Fresno State Bulldogs
Medal record
Representing United States
Pan American Games
Bronze medal – third place	1991 Havana	Discus throw

Leonora Lacy Barnes-Mileham (born December 23, 1964) is a former track and field athlete. She was the United States women's discus throw track and field champion in 1988 and 1991 and the top U.S. finisher in the 1996 Atlanta Olympics.

Barnes studied at California State University, Fresno, competing for the track team. Barnes earned a Ph.D. in psychology from Claremont Graduate University in 2010. In 2000, she was inducted into the Fresno County Athletic Hall of Fame. She resides in Fresno County and is a psychology professor at Madera Community College in Madera, California.

Barnes married Matthew Mileham, a fellow Fresno State track team member who competed in the hammer throw for Great Britain in the 1984 and 1988 Olympics, they divorced in October 2009. She remarried in November 2013 to architect and sculptor Marvin Armstrong.

== International competitions ==
Year	Competition	Venue	Position	Notes
Representing the United States
1996	Olympic Games	Atlanta, United States	30th	57.48 m
