= Abel Teffra =

American middle distance runner

Abel Teffra (born January 23, 2002) is an American professional middle-distance runner from Fresno, California. He competes for HOKA’s professional athletics club as of the 2025 outdoor track and field season, and attended Georgetown University as a member of the men’s cross country and track & field team from 2020 to 2025.

== Background and personal life ==
Teffra was born on January 23, 2002, and grew up in Fresno, California.

In a letter he wrote as a part of MileSplit’s “Dear Running” series, Teffra states that he ran his first race in seventh grade and “always was curious about what it was like competing on the next level.”

He has a younger brother, Alazar, who competes for Georgetown University as of the 2025-6 competition season.

== High school career ==
In his “Dear Running” letter, Teffra writes he “didn't take running seriously until [his] Junior year of High school”, when he began training under a new coach.

His senior year, Teffra announced his commitment to Georgetown University.

Due to widespread spring sport cancellations in 2020 resulting from the COVID-19 pandemic, he was unable to compete his senior spring.

Despite losing the opportunity to race his senior spring, Teffra graduated in 2020 with school records in the 800m, 1600m, 3200m, and the cross country 2 mile, 3 mile, and 5k events.

== College career ==
Throughout his collegiate career Teffra trained under Brandon Bonsey, who coaches the Georgetown University middle distance and long distance men.

=== Freshman through junior year (Fall 2021 - Spring 2024) ===
Teffra did not compete his first year at Georgetown, opting to delay his four years of competition eligibility. During his 2021-2022 season, Teffra set personal bests of 3:59.82 in the mile and 1:48.94 in the 800m. The following year, during his 2022-2023 season, Teffra lowered his personal best in the mile to 3:57.76 and set a personal best in the 1000m of 2:21.80. In his 2023-2024 season, Teffra again lowered his 1000m best to 2:19.17, and his mile to 3:54.62.

=== Senior year (Fall 2024 - Spring 2025) ===
On March 15, 2025, Teffra won the 2025 NCAA indoor championship mile, his first national championship win, in a meet record time of 3:53.60. This performance also broke the previous NCAA indoor championship meet record, set by 2024 1500m Olympic gold medalist Cole Hocker.

On April 25, alongside James Dunne, Theo Woods, and Tinoda Matsatsa, Teffra ran the final leg in the 2025 Penn Relays 4 × 800 m relay, anchoring the Georgetown men to victory. The team time was 7:13.95, with Teffra running a split of 1:48.94.

On June 11, Teffra competed in the NCAA outdoor championship 1500m, failing to advance beyond the semifinal round with an 11th place finish in his heat in 3:53.52. Since Teffra was coming off of his mile victory at NCAA indoors, running journalists called the result “stunning.”

== Pro career ==
On July 12, 2025 Teffra ran the 800m at the Sound Running Sunset Tour, placing 5th in 1:46.82. In a post-race interview, Teffra confirmed that the race was his pro debut as an athlete for HOKA Running Club.

On July 31, Teffra raced the 1500m at the USA Championships, failing to advance beyond the preliminary heats with a 7th place finish in 3:35.60.

== Personal bests ==
Event	Date	Time	Meet	Location
800m	May 17 2025	1:45.67	2025 Big East Outdoor Conference Championships	Storrs, CT
1000m	January 17, 2025	2:17.39	2025 Nittany Lion Challenge	State College, PA
1500m	May 4, 2025	3:33.84	2025 Duke Twilight Meet	Durham, NC
Mile	February 8, 2025	3:52.44	2025 Boston University Bruce Lehane Scarlet and White Invitational	Boston, MA
