= James Trapp =

American sprinter and football player (born 1969)

No. 37, 38, 33
- Positions: Cornerback, safety

Personal information
- Born: December 28, 1969 (age 56); Greenville, South Carolina, U.S.
- Listed height: 6 ft 0 in (1.83 m)
- Listed weight: 190 lb (86 kg)

Career information
- High school: Lawton (Lawton, Oklahoma)
- College: Clemson
- NFL draft: 1993: 3rd round, 72nd overall pick

Career history
- Los Angeles/Oakland Raiders (1993–1998); Baltimore Ravens (1999–2002); Jacksonville Jaguars (2003)

Awards and highlights
- Super Bowl champion (XXXV)

Career NFL statistics
- Tackles: 349
- Sacks: 6
- Interceptions: 9
- Stats at Pro Football Reference

James Trapp (born December 28, 1969) is an American former sprinter and professional football player who is a co-owner and Facility Coordinator for D1 Sports Training in Greenville, SC. He played in the National Football League (NFL) as a defensive back.

Trapp played college football for the Clemson Tigers and was selected 72nd overall by the Los Angeles Raiders in the third round of the 1993 NFL draft. Trapp earned a Super Bowl ring while playing for the Baltimore Ravens in the 2000 season.

== Track and field ==
Trapp was a World-Class sprinter. At the 1991 World University Games he won a gold medal in the 4 × 100 meter relay. He finished third behind fellow American Jon Drummond in the 200 metres event at the British 1991 AAA Championships.

He was a 1992 U.S. Olympic Team alternate in the 4 × 100 meter relay. At the 1993 IAAF World Indoor Championships, Trapp won the gold medal in the 200 meter dash, with a time of 20.60 seconds.

His personal bests are 10.03 seconds in the 100 meters and 20.17 seconds in the 200 meters, but also competed in the 55 meters, posting a personal best of 6.16 seconds.

=== Personal bests ===
Event	Time (seconds)	Venue	Date
55 meters	6.16	Reno, Nevada	February 22, 1992
100 meters	10.03	Austin, Texas	May 9, 1992
200 meters	20.17	New Orleans, Louisiana	April 28, 1992
