= 1998 NCAA Division I Indoor Track and Field Championships =

- Organisers: NCAA
- Edition: 34th (Men); 16th (Women)
- Dates: March 13-14, 1998
- Host city: Indianapolis, Indiana
- Venue: RCA Dome
- Level: Division I

The 1998 NCAA Division I Indoor Track and Field Championships were contested to determine the individual and team national champions of men's and women's NCAA collegiate indoor track and field events in the United States after the 1997–98 season, the 34th annual meet for men and 16th annual meet for women.

The championships were again held at the RCA Dome in Indianapolis, Indiana.

Defending champions Arkansas again won the men's team title, the Razorbacks' fourteenth overall and fourteenth in fifteen years.

Texas won the women's team title, the Longhorns' fourth and first since 1990.

== Qualification ==
All teams and athletes from Division I indoor track and field programs were eligible to compete for this year's individual and team titles.

== Team standings ==
- Note: Top 10 only
- Scoring: 6 points for a 1st-place finish in an event, 4 points for 2nd, 3 points for 3rd, 2 points for 4th, and 1 point for 5th
- (DC) = Defending Champions

=== Men's title ===
- 65 teams scored at least one point

Rank	Team	Points
1st place, gold medalist(s)	Arkansas (DC)	56
2nd place, silver medalist(s)	Stanford	36.5
3rd place, bronze medalist(s)	Clemson	26
3rd place, bronze medalist(s)	Washington State	26
5	SMU	23
6	Michigan	20
T7	Baylor	18
T7	Florida	18
T7	Georgia Tech	18
T7	South Carolina	18

=== Women's title ===
- 62 teams scored at least one point

Rank	Team	Points
1st place, gold medalist(s)	Texas	60
2nd place, silver medalist(s)	LSU (DC)	30
3rd place, bronze medalist(s)	Georgetown	26
3rd place, bronze medalist(s)	Pittsburgh	26
5	Michigan	24.5
6	Florida	24
7	SMU	23
8	Georgia	21
9	Wisconsin	20
10	BYU	18.5
