= 1989 NCAA Division I Indoor Track and Field Championships =

- Organisers: NCAA
- Edition: 25th (Men); 7th (Women)
- Dates: March 10-11, 1989
- Host city: Indianapolis, Indiana
- Venue: Hoosier Dome
- Level: Division I

The 1989 NCAA Division I Indoor Track and Field Championships were contested at the Hoosier Dome in Indianapolis, Indiana to determine the individual and team national champions of men's and women's NCAA collegiate indoor track and field events in the United States. These were the 25th annual men's championships and the 7th annual women's championships.

Five-time defending champions Arkansas claimed the men's team title, the Razorbacks' sixth overall title and, ultimately, the sixth of twelve straight titles for Arkansas.

LSU won the women's team title, the Lady Tigers' second team title and second in three years.

== Qualification ==
All teams and athletes from Division I indoor track and field programs were eligible to compete for this year's individual and team titles.

== Team standings ==
- Note: Top 10 only
- Scoring: 6 points for a 1st-place finish in an event, 4 points for 2nd, 3 points for 3rd, 2 points for 4th, and 1 point for 5th
- (DC) = Defending Champions

=== Men's title ===
- 53 teams scored at least one point

| Rank | Team | Points |
|---|---|---|
| 1st place, gold medalist(s) | Arkansas (DC) | 34 |
| 2nd place, silver medalist(s) | Florida | 31 |
| 3rd place, bronze medalist(s) | Texas A&M | 23 |
| T4 | Baylor | 22 |
| T4 | Kansas | 22 |
| T6 | George Mason | 20 |
| T6 | LSU | 20 |
| 8 | Clemson | 19 |
| 9 | Houston | 18 |
| T10 | Southwestern Louisiana | 16 |
| T10 | Michigan | 16 |

=== Women's title ===
- 43 teams scored at least one point

| Rank | Team | Points |
|---|---|---|
| 1st place, gold medalist(s) | LSU | 61 |
| 2nd place, silver medalist(s) | Villanova | 34 |
| 3rd place, bronze medalist(s) | Alabama | 24 |
| 3rd place, bronze medalist(s) | Texas (DC) | 24 |
| 5 | Indiana | 22 |
| 6 | Rice | 18 |
| 7 | Nebraska | 17 |
| T8 | Kentucky | 15 |
| T8 | Missouri | 15 |
| T8 | North Carolina | 15 |
