= 2009 NCAA Division I Indoor Track and Field Championships =

- Dates: March 13–14, 2009
- Host city: College Station, Texas; Texas A&M University
- Venue: Gilliam Indoor Track Stadium
- Events: 32

The 2009 NCAA Division I Indoor Track and Field Championships was the 44th NCAA Men's Division I Indoor Track and Field Championships and the 27th NCAA Women's Division I Indoor Track and Field Championships, held at the Gilliam Indoor Track Stadium in College Station, Texas near the campus of the host school, Texas A&M University. In total, thirty-two different men's and women's indoor track and field events were contested from March 13 to March 14, 2009.

At the championships, Galen Rupp won the 3000 meters, 5000 meters, and distance medley relay.

== Team scores ==
- Note: Top 3 only
- Scoring: 10 points for a 1st-place finish in an event, 8 points for 2nd, 6 points for 3rd, 5 points for 4th, 4 points for 5th, 3 points for 6th, 2points for 7th, and 1 point for 8th.

=== Men's teams ===
Pl.	Team	Points
1	Oregon	54
2	Florida	36
3	Florida State	32

=== Women's teams ===
Rank	Team	Points
1	Tennessee	42
2	Texas A&M	37
3	Brigham Young	33

== Results ==
=== Men ===
==== 60 meters ====
Rank	Athlete	Team	Time	Notes
1st place, gold medalist(s)	Jacoby Ford	Clemson	6.52	

==== 200 meters ====
Rank	Athlete	Team	Time	Notes
1st place, gold medalist(s)	Trey Harts	Baylor	20.63	

==== 400 meters ====
Rank	Athlete	Team	Time	Notes
1st place, gold medalist(s)	Michael Bingham	Wake Forest	45.69	

==== 800 meters ====
Rank	Athlete	Team	Time	Notes
1st place, gold medalist(s)	Jacob Hernandez	Texas	1:48.04	

==== Mile run ====
Rank	Athlete	Team	Time	Notes
1st place, gold medalist(s)	Lee Emanuel	New Mexico	4:00.36	

==== 3000 meters ====
Rank	Athlete	Team	Time	Notes
1st place, gold medalist(s)	Galen Rupp	Oregon	7:48.94	

==== 5000 meters ====
Rank	Athlete	Team	Time	Notes
1st place, gold medalist(s)	Galen Rupp	Oregon	13:41.45	

==== 60 meter hurdles ====
Rank	Athlete	Team	Time	Notes
1st place, gold medalist(s)	Ronnie Ash	Bethune–Cookman	7.63	

==== 4 × 400 meter relay ====
Rank	Athletes	Team	Time	Notes
1st place, gold medalist(s)	Trey Harts; Marcus Boyd; LeJerald Betters; Quentin Iglehart-Summers	Baylor	3:05.81	

==== Distance medley relay ====
Rank	Athletes	Team	Time	Notes
1st place, gold medalist(s)	AJ Acosta; Chad Barlow; Andrew Wheating; Galen Rupp	Oregon	9:29.59	

==== Shot put ====
Rank	Athlete	Team	Mark	Notes
1st place, gold medalist(s)	Ryan Whiting	Arizona State	20.16 m	

==== Weight throw ====
Rank	Athlete	Team	Mark	Notes
1st place, gold medalist(s)	Jason Lewis	Arizona State	22.88 m	

==== High jump ====
Rank	Athlete	Team	Mark	Notes
1st place, gold medalist(s)	Scott Sellers	Kansas State	2.25 m	

==== Long jump ====
Rank	Athlete	Team	Mark	Notes
1st place, gold medalist(s)	Nicholas Gordon	Nebraska	8.03 m	

==== Triple jump ====
Rank	Athlete	Team	Mark	Notes
1st place, gold medalist(s)	Christian Taylor	Florida	16.98 m	

==== Pole vault ====
Rank	Athlete	Team	Mark	Notes
1st place, gold medalist(s)	Jason Colwick	Rice	5.60 m	

==== Heptathlon ====
Rank	Athlete	Team	Mark	Notes
1st place, gold medalist(s)	Ashton Eaton	Oregon	5988 pts	

=== Women ===
==== 60 meters ====
Rank	Athlete	Team	Time	Notes
1st place, gold medalist(s)	Lakya Brookins	South Carolina	7.13	

==== 200 meters ====
Rank	Athlete	Team	Time	Notes
1st place, gold medalist(s)	Murielle Ahoure	Miami	22.80	

==== 400 meters ====
Rank	Athlete	Team	Time	Notes
1st place, gold medalist(s)	Francena McCorory	Hampton	51.55	

==== 800 meters ====
Rank	Athlete	Team	Time	Notes
1st place, gold medalist(s)	Lacey Cramer	Brigham Young	2:04.27	

==== Mile run ====
Rank	Athlete	Team	Time	Notes
1st place, gold medalist(s)	Sarah Bowman	Tennessee	4:29.72	

==== 3000 meters ====
Rank	Athlete	Team	Time	Notes
1st place, gold medalist(s)	Jenny Barringer	Colorado	8:42.03	

==== 5000 meters ====
Rank	Athlete	Team	Time	Notes
1st place, gold medalist(s)	Sally Kipyego	Texas Tech	15:51.14	

==== 60 meter hurdles ====
Rank	Athlete	Team	Time	Notes
1st place, gold medalist(s)	Tiffany Ofili	Michigan	8.00	

==== 4 × 400 meter relay ====
Rank	Athletes	Team	Time	Notes
1st place, gold medalist(s)	Allison George; Sandy Wooten; Porscha Lucas; Jessica Beard	Texas A&M	3:32.52	

==== Distance medley relay ====
Rank	Athletes	Team	Time	Notes
1st place, gold medalist(s)	Phoebe Wright; Brittany Jones; Chanelle Price; Sarah Bowman	Tennessee	10:50.98	

==== Shot put ====
Rank	Athlete	Team	Mark	Notes
1st place, gold medalist(s)	Mariam Kevkhishvili	Florida	17.84 m	

==== Weight throw ====
Rank	Athlete	Team	Mark	Notes
1st place, gold medalist(s)	D'Ana McCarty	Louisville	22.09 m	

==== High jump ====
Rank	Athlete	Team	Mark	Notes
1st place, gold medalist(s)	Destinee Hooker	Texas	1.98 m	

==== Long jump ====
Rank	Athlete	Team	Mark	Notes
1st place, gold medalist(s)	Eleni Kafourou	Boise State	6.53 m	

==== Triple jump ====
Rank	Athlete	Team	Mark	Notes
1st place, gold medalist(s)	Kimberly Williams	Florida State	13.81 m	

==== Pole vault ====
Rank	Athlete	Team	Mark	Notes
1st place, gold medalist(s)	Kylie Hutson	Indiana State	4.35 m	

==== Pentathlon ====
Rank	Athlete	Team	Mark	Notes
1st place, gold medalist(s)	Amy Menlove	Brigham Young	4365 pts	

== See also ==
- NCAA Men's Division I Indoor Track and Field Championships
- NCAA Women's Division I Indoor Track and Field Championships
