= 2004 NCAA Division I Indoor Track and Field Championships =

- Organisers: NCAA
- Edition: 40th (Men); 22nd (Women)
- Dates: March 12-13, 2004
- Host city: Fayetteville, Arkansas
- Venue: Randal Tyson Track Center
- Level: Division I

The 2004 NCAA Division I Indoor Track and Field Championships were contested to determine the individual and team national champions of men's and women's NCAA collegiate indoor track and field events in the United States after the 2003–04 season, the 40th annual meet for men and 22nd annual meet for women.

For the fifth consecutive year, the championships were held at the Randal Tyson Track Center at the University of Arkansas in Fayetteville, Arkansas.

LSU won the men's title, the Tigers' second and first since 2001.

LSU also won the women's title, the Lady Tigers' eleventh and third consecutive.

== Qualification ==
All teams and athletes from Division I indoor track and field programs were eligible to compete for this year's individual and team titles.

== Team standings ==
- Note: Top 10 only
- Scoring: 6 points for a 1st-place finish in an event, 4 points for 2nd, 3 points for 3rd, 2 points for 4th, and 1 point for 5th
- (DC) = Defending Champions
- † = Participation vacated by NCAA Committee on Infractions

=== Men's title ===
- 68 teams scored at least one point

Rank	Team	Points
1st place, gold medalist(s)	LSU	44 1/2
2nd place, silver medalist(s)	Arkansas (DC) †	38
2nd place, silver medalist(s)	Florida	38
4	Texas	31
5	Michigan	28
T6	Baylor	25
T6	Purdue	25
8	TCU †	24
9	Ohio State	20
T10	BYU	19
T10	Wisconsin	19

=== Women's title ===
- 55 teams scored at least one point

Rank	Team	Points
1st place, gold medalist(s)	LSU (DC)	52
2nd place, silver medalist(s)	Florida	51
3rd place, bronze medalist(s)	Nebraska	45 1/2
4	Tennessee	43
5	UCLA	40
6	Georgia	36
T7	Stanford	30
T7	Texas	30
9	Providence	20
T10	Arkansas	19
T10	Miami (FL)	19
T10	South Carolina	19

== See also ==
- 2003 NCAA Division I Cross Country Championships
- 2004 NCAA Division I Outdoor Track and Field Championships
