= 1993 NCAA Division I Indoor Track and Field Championships =

- Organisers: NCAA
- Edition: 29th (Men); 11th (Women)
- Dates: March 12-13, 1993
- Host city: Indianapolis, Indiana
- Venue: Hoosier Dome
- Level: Division I

The 1993 NCAA Division I Indoor Track and Field Championships were contested to determine the individual and team national champions of men's and women's NCAA collegiate indoor track and field events in the United States after the 1992–93 season, the 29th annual meet for men and 11th annual for women.

The championships were again held at the Hoosier Dome in Indianapolis, Indiana.

Nine-time defending champions Arkansas again claimed the men's team title, the Razorbacks' tenth overall and ninth of twelve consecutive.

LSU won the women's team title, the Lady Tigers' fourth overall and fourth in seven years.

== Qualification ==
All teams and athletes from Division I indoor track and field programs were eligible to compete for this year's individual and team titles.

== Team standings ==
- Note: Top 10 only
- Scoring: 6 points for a 1st-place finish in an event, 4 points for 2nd, 3 points for 3rd, 2 points for 4th, and 1 point for 5th
- (DC) = Defending Champions

=== Men's title ===
- 47 teams scored at least one point

| Rank | Team | Points |
|---|---|---|
| 1st place, gold medalist(s) | Arkansas (DC) | 66 |
| 2nd place, silver medalist(s) | Clemson | 30 |
| 3rd place, bronze medalist(s) | Tennessee | 25 |
| 4 | UTEP | 22 |
| 5 | Ohio State | 20 |
| 6 | Minnesota | 18 |
| 7 | Georgia Tech | 17 |
| 8 | Kansas State | 16 |
| T9 | Eastern Michigan | 14 |
| T9 | Florida | 14 |
| T9 | North Carolina | 14 |

=== Women's title ===
- 44 teams scored at least one point

| Rank | Team | Points |
|---|---|---|
| 1st place, gold medalist(s) | LSU | 49 |
| 2nd place, silver medalist(s) | Wisconsin | 44 |
| 3rd place, bronze medalist(s) | Florida (DC) | 34 |
| 4 | Villanova | 22 |
| T5 | Alabama | 20 |
| T5 | Indiana State | 20 |
| 7 | Texas | 18 |
| T8 | Arizona | 16 |
| T8 | Arkansas | 16 |
| T8 | Auburn | 16 |
