= 2002 NCAA Division I Indoor Track and Field Championships =

- Organisers: NCAA
- Edition: 38th (Men); 20th (Women)
- Dates: March 8-9, 2002
- Host city: Fayetteville, Arkansas
- Venue: Randal Tyson Track Center
- Level: Division I

The 2002 NCAA Division I Indoor Track and Field Championships were contested to determine the individual and team national champions of men's and women's NCAA collegiate indoor track and field events in the United States after the 2001–02 season, the 38th annual meet for men and 20th annual meet for women.

The championships were held at the Randal Tyson Track Center at the University of Arkansas in Fayetteville, Arkansas.

Tennessee won the men's title, the Volunteers' first.

LSU won the women's title, the Lady Tigers' ninth and first since 1997.

== Qualification ==
All teams and athletes from Division I indoor track and field programs were eligible to compete for this year's individual and team titles.

== Team standings ==
- Note: Top 10 only
- Scoring: 6 points for a 1st-place finish in an event, 4 points for 2nd, 3 points for 3rd, 2 points for 4th, and 1 point for 5th
- (DC) = Defending Champions
- † = Participation vacated by NCAA Committee on Infractions

=== Men's title ===
- 64 teams scored at least one point

Rank	Team	Points
1st place, gold medalist(s)	Tennessee	62 1/2
2nd place, silver medalist(s)	Alabama	47
3rd place, bronze medalist(s)	LSU (DC)	44
4	Arkansas	39
5	Villanova	20
6	South Carolina	17 1/2
7	Clemson	17
8	Kansas	16
T9	Mississippi State	15
T9	Oregon	15

=== Women's title ===
- 54 teams scored at least one point

Rank	Team	Points
1st place, gold medalist(s)	LSU	57
2nd place, silver medalist(s)	UCLA (DC)	43
3rd place, bronze medalist(s)	Florida	35
4	South Carolina	31
T5	North Carolina	25
T5	Rice	25
T5	Stanford	25
8	Indiana	23
9	Arizona	19
10	Arkansas	18 1/2
