= 2010 NCAA Division I Indoor Track and Field Championships =

- Dates: March 12-13, 2010
- Host city: Fayetteville, Arkansas; University of Arkansas
- Venue: Randal Tyson Track Center
- Events: 32

The 2010 NCAA Division I Indoor Track and Field Championships was the 45th NCAA Men's Division I Indoor Track and Field Championships and the 28th NCAA Women's Division I Indoor Track and Field Championships, held at the Randal Tyson Track Center in Fayetteville, Arkansas near the campus of the host school, University of Arkansas. In total, thirty-two different men's and women's indoor track and field events were contested from March 12 to March 13, 2010.

The meeting was noted for having similarities with the previous edition, causing one recap to be titled, "Deja Vu".

== Team scores ==
- Note: Top 3 only
- Scoring: 10 points for a 1st-place finish in an event, 8 points for 2nd, 6 points for 3rd, 5 points for 4th, 4 points for 5th, 3 points for 6th, 2points for 7th, and 1 point for 8th.

=== Men's teams ===
Pl.	Team	Points
1	Florida	57
2	Oregon	44
2	Florida State	44

=== Women's teams ===
Pl.	Team	Points
1	Oregon	61
2	Tennessee	36
3	Louisiana State	35

== Results ==
=== Men ===
==== 60 meters ====
Rank	Athlete	Team	Time	Notes
1st place, gold medalist(s)	Jeff Demps	Florida	6.57	

==== 200 meters ====
Rank	Athlete	Team	Time	Notes
1st place, gold medalist(s)	Curtis Mitchell	Texas A&M	20.38	

==== 400 meters ====
Rank	Athlete	Team	Time	Notes
1st place, gold medalist(s)	Torrin Lawrence	Georgia	45.23	

==== 800 meters ====
Rank	Athlete	Team	Time	Notes
1st place, gold medalist(s)	Robby Andrews	Virginia	1:48.39	

==== Mile run ====
Rank	Athlete	Team	Time	Notes
1st place, gold medalist(s)	Lee Emanuel	New Mexico	3:59.26	

==== 3000 meters ====
Rank	Athlete	Team	Time	Notes
1st place, gold medalist(s)	Dorian Ulrey	Arkansas	8:10.52	

==== 5000 meters ====
Rank	Athlete	Team	Time	Notes
1st place, gold medalist(s)	David McNeill	Northern Arizona	13:36.41	

==== 60 meter hurdles ====
Rank	Athlete	Team	Time	Notes
1st place, gold medalist(s)	Ronnie Ash	Oklahoma	7.56	

==== 4 × 400 meter relay ====
Rank	Athletes	Team	Time	Notes
1st place, gold medalist(s)	Demetrius Pinder; Bryan Miller; Tabarie Henry; Curtis Mitchell	Texas A&M	3:04.4	

==== Distance medley relay ====
Rank	Athletes	Team	Time	Notes
1st place, gold medalist(s)	AJ Acosta; Chad Barlow; Travis Thompson; Andrew Wheating	Oregon	9:36.87	

==== High jump ====
Rank	Athlete	Team	Mark	Notes
1st place, gold medalist(s)	Derek Drouin	Indiana	2.28 m	

==== Pole vault ====
Rank	Athlete	Team	Mark	Notes
1st place, gold medalist(s)	Scott Roth	Washington	5.60 m	

==== Long jump ====
Rank	Athlete	Team	Mark	Notes
1st place, gold medalist(s)	Alain Bailey	Arkansas	8.17 m	

==== Triple jump ====
Rank	Athlete	Team	Mark	Notes
1st place, gold medalist(s)	Christian Taylor	Florida	17.18 m	

==== Shot put ====
Rank	Athlete	Team	Mark	Notes
1st place, gold medalist(s)	Ryan Whiting	Arizona State	21.52 m	

==== Weight throw ====
Rank	Athlete	Team	Mark	Notes
1st place, gold medalist(s)	Walter Henning	Louisiana State	23.56 m	

==== Heptathlon ====
Rank	Athlete	Team	Mark	Notes
1st place, gold medalist(s)	Ashton Eaton	Oregon	6499 pts	

=== Women ===
==== 60 meters ====
Rank	Athlete	Team	Time	Notes
1st place, gold medalist(s)	Blessing Okagbare	Texas El Paso	7.18	

==== 200 meters ====
Rank	Athlete	Team	Time	Notes
1st place, gold medalist(s)	Shaniqua Ferguson	Auburn	23.09	

==== 400 meters ====
Rank	Athlete	Team	Time	Notes
1st place, gold medalist(s)	Francena McCorory	Hampton	50.54	

==== 800 meters ====
Rank	Athlete	Team	Time	Notes
1st place, gold medalist(s)	Phoebe Wright	Tennessee	2:02.55	

==== Mile run ====
Rank	Athlete	Team	Time	Notes
1st place, gold medalist(s)	Charlotte Browning	Florida	4:35.66	

==== 3000 meters ====
Rank	Athlete	Team	Time	Notes
1st place, gold medalist(s)	Angela Bizzarri	Illinois	8:57.40	

==== 5000 meters ====
Rank	Athlete	Team	Time	Notes
1st place, gold medalist(s)	Lisa Koll	Iowa State	15:39.65	

==== 60 meter hurdles ====
Rank	Athlete	Team	Time	Notes
1st place, gold medalist(s)	Queen Quedith Harrison	Virginia Tech	7.95	

==== 4 × 400 meter relay ====
Rank	Athletes	Team	Time	Notes
1st place, gold medalist(s)	Jamesha Youngblood; Keshia Baker; Michele Williams; Amber Purvis	Oregon	3:32.97	

==== Distance medley relay ====
Rank	Athletes	Team	Time	Notes
1st place, gold medalist(s)	Phoebe Wright; Ellen Wortham; Chanelle Price; Brittany Sheffey	Tennessee	10:58.37	

==== High jump ====
Rank	Athlete	Team	Mark	Notes
1st place, gold medalist(s)	Elizabeth Patterson	Arizona	1.93 m	

==== Pole vault ====
Rank	Athlete	Team	Mark	Notes
1st place, gold medalist(s)	Kylie Hutson	Indiana State	4.50 m	

==== Long jump ====
Rank	Athlete	Team	Mark	Notes
1st place, gold medalist(s)	Blessing Okagbare	Texas El Paso	6.87 m	

==== Triple jump ====
Rank	Athlete	Team	Mark	Notes
1st place, gold medalist(s)	Kimberly Williams	Florida State	13.95 m	

==== Shot put ====
Rank	Athlete	Team	Mark	Notes
1st place, gold medalist(s)	Mariam Kevkhishvili	Florida	18.59 m	

==== Weight throw ====
Rank	Athlete	Team	Mark	Notes
1st place, gold medalist(s)	D'Ana McCarty	Louisville	22.76 m	

==== Pentathlon ====
Rank	Athlete	Team	Mark	Notes
1st place, gold medalist(s)	Brianne Theisen	Oregon	4396 pts	

== See also ==
- NCAA Men's Division I Indoor Track and Field Championships
- NCAA Women's Division I Indoor Track and Field Championships
