= 1999 NCAA Division I Indoor Track and Field Championships =

- Organisers: NCAA
- Edition: 35th (Men); 17th (Women)
- Dates: March 5-6, 1999
- Host city: Indianapolis, Indiana
- Venue: RCA Dome
- Level: Division I

The 1999 NCAA Division I Indoor Track and Field Championships were contested to determine the individual and team national champions of men's and women's NCAA collegiate indoor track and field events in the United States after the 1998–99 season, the 35th annual meet for men and 17th annual meet for women.

After serving as host for the previous ten years, the championships were held at the RCA Dome in Indianapolis, Indiana for the last time.

Two-time defending champions Arkansas again won the men's team title, the Razorbacks' fifteenth overall and fifteenth in sixteen years.

Defending champions Texas won the women's team title, the Longhorns' fifth overall and second consecutive.

== Qualification ==
All teams and athletes from Division I indoor track and field programs were eligible to compete for this year's individual and team titles.

== Team standings ==
- Note: Top 10 only
- Scoring: 6 points for a 1st-place finish in an event, 4 points for 2nd, 3 points for 3rd, 2 points for 4th, and 1 point for 5th
- (DC) = Defending Champions

=== Men's title ===
- 59 teams scored at least one point

Rank	Team	Points
1st place, gold medalist(s)	Arkansas (DC)	65
2nd place, silver medalist(s)	Stanford	42.5
3rd place, bronze medalist(s)	Clemson	28
4	South Carolina	27
5	Texas	25
6	SMU	24
T7	Florida	22
T7	George Mason	22
T7	LSU	22
10	Washington State	21

=== Women's title ===
- 60 teams scored at least one point

Rank	Team	Points
1st place, gold medalist(s)	Texas (DC)	61
2nd place, silver medalist(s)	LSU	57
3rd place, bronze medalist(s)	SMU	25
T4	Baylor	24
T4	Florida	24
T6	BYU	23
T6	Pittsburgh	23
T8	UCLA	22
T8	Wisconsin	22
10	North Carolina	21
