= 2000 NCAA Division I Indoor Track and Field Championships =

- Organisers: NCAA
- Edition: 36th (Men); 18th (Women)
- Dates: March 10-11, 2000
- Host city: Fayetteville, Arkansas
- Venue: Randal Tyson Track Center
- Level: Division I

The 2000 NCAA Division I Indoor Track and Field Championships were contested to determine the individual and team national champions of men's and women's NCAA collegiate indoor track and field events in the United States after the 1999–2000 season, the 36th annual meet for men and 18th annual meet for women.

The championships were held at the Randal Tyson Track Center at the University of Arkansas in Fayetteville, Arkansas.

Three-time defending champions and hosts Arkansas won the men's team title, the Razorbacks' sixteenth.

UCLA won the women's team title, the Bruins' first.

== Qualification ==
All teams and athletes from Division I indoor track and field programs were eligible to compete for this year's individual and team titles.

== Team standings ==
- Note: Top 10 only
- Scoring: 6 points for a 1st-place finish in an event, 4 points for 2nd, 3 points for 3rd, 2 points for 4th, and 1 point for 5th
- (DC) = Defending Champions

=== Men's title ===
- 62 teams scored at least one point

Rank	Team	Points
1st place, gold medalist(s)	Arkansas (DC)	69.5
2nd place, silver medalist(s)	Stanford	52
3rd place, bronze medalist(s)	SMU	38
4	TCU	34
5	Alabama	29
5	Florida	29
7	LSU	28
T8	South Alabama	20
T8	South Carolina	20
T10	Arizona State	16
T10	Clemson	16

=== Women's title ===
- 59 teams scored at least one point

Rank	Team	Points
1st place, gold medalist(s)	UCLA	51
2nd place, silver medalist(s)	South Carolina	41
3rd place, bronze medalist(s)	Arkansas	37
4	LSU	36
5	Villanova	31
6	BYU	28
7	Kansas State	25
8	Texas (DC)	23
9	Auburn	18
10	SMU	16
