= 1992 NCAA Division I Indoor Track and Field Championships =

- Organisers: NCAA
- Edition: 28th (Men); 10th (Women)
- Dates: March 13-14, 1992
- Host city: Indianapolis, Indiana
- Venue: Hoosier Dome
- Level: Division I

The 1992 NCAA Division I Indoor Track and Field Championships were contested to determine the individual and team national champions of men's and women's NCAA collegiate indoor track and field events in the United States after the 1991–92 season, the 27th annual meet for men and 9th annual for women.

The championships were again held at the Hoosier Dome in Indianapolis, Indiana.

Eight-time defending champions Arkansas claimed the men's team title, the Razorbacks' ninth title and the ninth of twelve straight titles.

Florida won the women's team title, the Gators' first.

== Qualification ==
All teams and athletes from Division I indoor track and field programs were eligible to compete for this year's individual and team titles.

== Team standings ==
- Note: Top 10 only
- Scoring: 6 points for a 1st-place finish in an event, 4 points for 2nd, 3 points for 3rd, 2 points for 4th, and 1 point for 5th
- (DC) = Defending Champions

=== Men's title ===
- 51 teams scored at least one point

Rank	Team	Points
1st place, gold medalist(s)	Arkansas (DC)	53
2nd place, silver medalist(s)	Clemson	46
3rd place, bronze medalist(s)	Florida	38
4	UTEP	25
T5	Georgetown	24
T5	LSU	24
7	North Carolina	21
8	Baylor	20
9	Iowa State	19
T10	Indiana	16
T10	Ohio State	16

=== Women's title ===
- 43 teams scored at least one point

Rank	Team	Points
1st place, gold medalist(s)	Florida	50
2nd place, silver medalist(s)	Stanford	26
3rd place, bronze medalist(s)	Villanova	22
T4	LSU (DC)	20
T4	Providence	20
T4	Wisconsin	20
T7	Georgia Tech	18
T7	Houston	18
T7	Nebraska	18
10	Texas	15
