= 2001 NCAA Division I Indoor Track and Field Championships =

- Organisers: NCAA
- Edition: 37th (Men); 19th (Women)
- Dates: March 9-10, 2001
- Host city: Fayetteville, Arkansas
- Venue: Randal Tyson Track Center
- Level: Division I

The 2001 NCAA Division I Indoor Track and Field Championships were contested to determine the individual and team national champions of men's and women's NCAA collegiate indoor track and field events in the United States after the 2000–01 season, the 37th annual meet for men and 19th annual meet for women.

The championships were held at the Randal Tyson Track Center at the University of Arkansas in Fayetteville, Arkansas.

Defending champions LSU and UCLA won the men's and women's team titles, respectively, the second title for both the Tigers and Bruins.

== Qualification ==
All teams and athletes from Division I indoor track and field programs were eligible to compete for this year's individual and team titles.

== Team standings ==
- Note: Top 10 only
- Scoring: 6 points for a 1st-place finish in an event, 4 points for 2nd, 3 points for 3rd, 2 points for 4th, and 1 point for 5th
- (DC) = Defending Champions
- † = Participation vacated by NCAA Committee on Infractions

=== Men's title ===
- 60 teams scored at least one point

Rank	Team	Points
1st place, gold medalist(s)	LSU (DC)	34
2nd place, silver medalist(s)	TCU †	33
3rd place, bronze medalist(s)	Arkansas	32
4	Alabama	31
5	Stanford	28 1/2
6	SMU	27
7	Florida	26
8	Kansas	20
9	Tennessee	19
10	Ole Miss	18

=== Women's title ===
- 63 teams scored at least one point

Rank	Team	Points
1st place, gold medalist(s)	UCLA (DC)	53 1/2
2nd place, silver medalist(s)	South Carolina	40
3rd place, bronze medalist(s)	Arizona	30
3rd place, bronze medalist(s)	Clemson	30
5	Arkansas	24
6	Colorado	22
7	Houston	21
7	Missouri	21
7	UTEP	21
10	North Carolina	19 1/3
