= 1994 NCAA Division I Indoor Track and Field Championships =

- Organisers: NCAA
- Edition: 30th (Men); 12th (Women)
- Dates: March 11-12, 1994
- Host city: Indianapolis, Indiana
- Venue: Hoosier Dome
- Level: Division I

The 1994 NCAA Division I Indoor Track and Field Championships were contested to determine the individual and team national champions of men's and women's NCAA collegiate indoor track and field events in the United States after the 1993–94 season, the 30th annual meet for men and 12th annual meet for women.

The championships were again held at the Hoosier Dome in Indianapolis, Indiana.

Ten-time defending champions Arkansas again claimed the men's team title, the Razorbacks' eleventh overall and tenth of twelve consecutive.

Defending champions LSU won the women's team title, the Lady Tigers' fifth.

== Qualification ==
All teams and athletes from Division I indoor track and field programs were eligible to compete for this year's individual and team titles.

== Team standings ==
- Note: Top 10 only
- Scoring: 6 points for a 1st-place finish in an event, 4 points for 2nd, 3 points for 3rd, 2 points for 4th, and 1 point for 5th
- (DC) = Defending Champions

=== Men's title ===
- 57 teams scored at least one point

Rank	Team	Points
1st place, gold medalist(s)	Arkansas (DC)	94
2nd place, silver medalist(s)	Tennessee	40
3rd place, bronze medalist(s)	UTEP	36
4	UCLA	25
5	Rice	24
6	Georgetown	21
6	Georgia	21
8	Ohio State	19
T9	Baylor	17
T9	Kentucky	17

=== Women's title ===
- 55 teams scored at least one point

Rank	Team	Points
1st place, gold medalist(s)	LSU (DC)	48
2nd place, silver medalist(s)	Alabama	29
3rd place, bronze medalist(s)	Seton Hall	28
3rd place, bronze medalist(s)	Texas	28
T5	Arizona	26
T5	Nebraska	26
7	Michigan	23
8	Middle Tennessee State	21
9	Indiana State	20
10	Villanova	19
