= 1995 NCAA Division I Indoor Track and Field Championships =

- Organisers: NCAA
- Edition: 31st (Men); 13th (Women)
- Dates: March 10-11, 1995
- Host city: Indianapolis, Indiana
- Venue: RCA Dome
- Level: Division I

The 1995 NCAA Division I Indoor Track and Field Championships were contested to determine the individual and team national champions of men's and women's NCAA collegiate indoor track and field events in the United States after the 1994–95 season, the 31st annual meet for men and 13th annual meet for women.

The championships were again held at the RCA Dome in Indianapolis, Indiana.

Eleven-time defending champions Arkansas again claimed the men's team title, the Razorbacks' twelfth overall.

Two-time defending champions LSU again won the women's team title, the Lady Tigers' sixth.

== Qualification ==
All teams and athletes from Division I indoor track and field programs were eligible to compete for this year's individual and team titles.

== Team standings ==
- Note: Top 10 only
- Scoring: 6 points for a 1st-place finish in an event, 4 points for 2nd, 3 points for 3rd, 2 points for 4th, and 1 point for 5th
- (DC) = Defending Champions

=== Men's title ===
- 57 teams scored at least one point

Rank	Team	Points
1st place, gold medalist(s)	Arkansas (DC)	59
2nd place, silver medalist(s)	George Mason	26
2nd place, silver medalist(s)	Tennessee	26
T4	Illinois	25
T4	Michigan	25
6	Georgia	24
T7	Baylor	22
T7	Rice	22
T7	UCLA	22
10	California	20

=== Women's title ===
- 50 teams scored at least one point

Rank	Team	Points
1st place, gold medalist(s)	LSU (DC)	40
2nd place, silver medalist(s)	UCLA	37
3rd place, bronze medalist(s)	Texas	32
T4	Arkansas	31
T4	Villanova	31
6	Pittsburgh	22
7	Georgia	20
T8	Nebraska	19
T8	North Carolina	19
10	Wisconsin	18
