= 1991 NCAA Division I Indoor Track and Field Championships =

- Organisers: NCAA
- Edition: 27th (Men); 9th (Women)
- Dates: March 8-9, 1991
- Host city: Indianapolis, Indiana
- Venue: Hoosier Dome
- Level: Division I

The 1991 NCAA Division I Indoor Track and Field Championships were contested to determine the individual and team national champions of men's and women's NCAA collegiate indoor track and field events in the United States, the 27th annual for men and 9th annual for women.

The championships were again held at the Hoosier Dome in Indianapolis, Indiana.

Seven-time defending champions Arkansas claimed the men's team title, the Razorbacks' eighth title and the eighth of twelve straight titles.

LSU won the women's team title, the Lady Tigers' third team title and third in five years.

== Qualification ==
All teams and athletes from Division I indoor track and field programs were eligible to compete for this year's individual and team titles.

== Team standings ==
- Note: Top 10 only
- Scoring: 10 points for a 1st-place finish in an event, 8 points for 2nd, 6 points for 3rd,

5 points for 4th, 4 points for 5th, 3 points for 6th, 2 points for 7th and 1 point for 8th

- (DC) = Defending Champions

=== Men's title ===
- 60 teams scored at least one point

Rank	Team	Points
1st place, gold medalist(s)	Arkansas (DC)	34
2nd place, silver medalist(s)	Georgetown	27
3rd place, bronze medalist(s)	Washington State	26
4	Iowa State	23
T5	George Mason	20
T5	Indiana	20
7	Baylor	17
8	BYU	16
T9	Eastern Michigan	14
T9	Ole Miss	14

=== Women's title ===
- 39 teams scored at least one point

Rank	Team	Points
1st place, gold medalist(s)	LSU	48
2nd place, silver medalist(s)	Texas (DC)	39
3rd place, bronze medalist(s)	Villanova	35
4	Nebraska	27
5	Florida	25
T6	Arizona State	24
T6	Tennessee	24
8	North Carolina	21
9	Alabama	17
10	Arizona	16
