= Tennessee Volunteers track and field =

Tennessee Volunteers track and field may refer to either the men's or women's track and field team at the University of Tennessee:

- Tennessee Volunteers men's track and field
- Tennessee Volunteers women's track and field
