= 1987 NCAA Division I indoor track and field championships =

1987 NCAA Division I Indoor Track and Field Championships
- Dates: March 13–14, 1987
- Host city: Oklahoma City, Oklahoma
- Venue: Myriad Convention Center

The 1987 NCAA Division I Indoor Track and Field Championships were contested March 13−14, 1987 at the Myriad Convention Center in Oklahoma City, Oklahoma to determine the individual and team national champions of men's and women's NCAA collegiate indoor track and field events in the United States. These were the 23rd annual men's championships and the 5th annual women's championships.

Three-time defending champions Arkansas claimed the men's team title, the Razorbacks' fourth overall title and, ultimately, the third of twelve straight titles for Arkansas. LSU, meanwhile, claimed their first women's team title, topping the team standings by five points.

== Qualification ==
All teams and athletes from Division I indoor track and field programs were eligible to compete for this year's individual and team titles.

== Team standings ==
- Note: Top 10 only
- Scoring: 6 points for a 1st-place finish in an event, 4 points for 2nd, 3 points for 3rd, 2 points for 4th, and 1 point for 5th
- (DC) = Defending Champions
- Full results

=== Men's title ===
Rank	Team	Points
1st place, gold medalist(s)	Arkansas (DC)	39
2nd place, silver medalist(s)	SMU	31
3rd place, bronze medalist(s)	Georgetown; Indiana; McNeese State	16
6	Fresno State; Houston; Kansas State; Pittsburgh; Washington State	14

=== Women's title ===
Rank	Team	Points
1st place, gold medalist(s)	LSU	49
2nd place, silver medalist(s)	Tennessee	30
3rd place, bronze medalist(s)	Villanova	24
4	Arizona; Texas (DC)	22
6	Nebraska; Stanford	20
8	USC	19
9	Virginia	16
10	Alabama	15
