= 1990 NCAA Division I Indoor Track and Field Championships =

- Organisers: NCAA
- Edition: 26th (Men); 8th (Women)
- Dates: March 9-10, 1990
- Host city: Indianapolis, Indiana
- Venue: Hoosier Dome
- Level: Division I

The 1990 NCAA Division I Indoor Track and Field Championships were contested at the Hoosier Dome in Indianapolis, Indiana to determine the individual and team national champions of men's and women's NCAA collegiate indoor track and field events in the United States. These were the 26th annual men's championships and the 8th annual women's championships.

Six-time defending champions Arkansas claimed the men's team title, the Razorbacks' seventh title and the seventh of twelve straight titles.

Texas won the women's team title, the Longhorns' third team title and third in five years.

== Qualification ==
All teams and athletes from Division I indoor track and field programs were eligible to compete for this year's individual and team titles.

== Team standings ==
- Note: Top 10 only
- Scoring: 6 points for a 1st-place finish in an event, 4 points for 2nd, 3 points for 3rd, 2 points for 4th, and 1 point for 5th
- (DC) = Defending Champions

=== Men's title ===
- 57 teams scored at least one point

Rank	Team	Points
1st place, gold medalist(s)	Arkansas (DC)	44
2nd place, silver medalist(s)	Florida	29
3rd place, bronze medalist(s)	George Mason	26
3rd place, bronze medalist(s)	Texas A&M	26
5	LSU	25
6	BYU	24
7	Baylor	23
8	Iowa State	20
9	Houston	18
10	UTEP	15

=== Women's title ===
- 48 teams scored at least one point

Rank	Team	Points
1st place, gold medalist(s)	Texas	50
2nd place, silver medalist(s)	Wisconsin	26
3rd place, bronze medalist(s)	Florida	22.5
T4	Arizona State	20
T4	California	20
6	Villanova	18
7	Indiana	16
T8	LSU (DC)	14
T8	Nebraska	14
T8	Tennessee	14
