= Baylor Bears track and field =

Sport track and field for Baylor University

- University: Baylor University
- Conference: Big 12
- Location: Waco, TX
- Outdoor track: Tom Black Track at LaPorte Stadium
- Nickname: Bears
- Colors: Green and gold

NCAA Indoor National Championships
- Men's

NCAA Outdoor National Championships
- Men's

NCAA Indoor Tournament Appearances
- Men's

NCAA Outdoor Tournament Appearances
- Men's

Conference Indoor Championships
- Men's: Women's

Conference Outdoor Championships
- Men's: Women's

The Baylor Bears track and field program represents the Baylor University in the sport of track and field. The indoor and outdoor programs compete in Division I of the National Collegiate Athletic Association (NCAA) and the Big 12 Conference (Big 12). The Bears host their home outdoor meets at Clyde Hart Track and Field Stadium, located on the university's Waco, Texas campus.

== History ==
Baylor's heralded track and field team has produced nine Olympic gold medals, 36 NCAA championships, and 606 All-Americas performances. A majority of the All-Americans coming under the 42-year tenure of head coach Clyde Hart. A marquee element of the track program has been its men's 4 × 400 relay team, which has sent teams to the NCAA finals in each of the past 28 years. Baylor track and field has also produced three Olympic gold medalists: Michael Johnson, Jeremy Wariner and Darold Williamson. Baylor grads won gold in the 400 meter dash at three consecutive Olympics (Johnson in '96 and '00, then Wariner in '04). In 2005, Clyde Hart became Director of Track & Field, and Todd Harbour took over as head coach of Baylor's track and field and cross country squads.

== Michael Johnson Classic ==
The Bears host the Michael Johnson Classic, also known as the Michael Johnson Invitational, annually in April. The track meet hosted Athing Mu's 800 m collegiate record in 2021.

== Coaching staff ==
Michael Ford - Head Coach

== Baylor Olympic track and field medalists ==
=== Men ===
Athlete	Olympics	Event	Medal
Michael Johnson (United States)	1992 Barcelona	4x400 m relay	Gold
Michael Johnson (United States)	1996 Atlanta	200 m	Gold
Michael Johnson (United States)	1996 Atlanta	400 m	Gold
Michael Johnson (United States)	2000 Sydney	400 m	Gold
Michael Johnson (United States)	2000 Sydney	4x400 m relay	1st place Disqualified due to doping by Antonio Pettigrew
Jeremy Wariner (United States)	2004 Athens	400 m	Gold
Jeremy Wariner (United States)	2004 Athens	4x400 m relay	Gold
Jeremy Wariner (United States)	2008 Beijing	400 m	Silver
Jeremy Wariner (United States)	2008 Beijing	4x400 m relay	Gold
Darold Williamson (United States)	2004 Athens	4x400 m relay	Gold
Reggie Witherspoon (United States)	2008 Beijing	4x400 m relay	Gold
