= Arizona Wildcats track and field =

College track and field team

- University: University of Arizona
- Head coach: Andrew Dubs
- Conference: Big 12
- Location: Tucson, Arizona
- Outdoor track: Roy P. Drachman Stadium
- Nickname: Wildcats
- Colors: Cardinal and navy

The Arizona Wildcats track and field team is the track and field program that represents University of Arizona. The Wildcats compete in NCAA Division I as a member of the Big 12 Conference. The team is based in Tucson, Arizona, at the Roy P. Drachman Stadium.

The program is coached by Andrew Dubs. The track and field program officially encompasses four teams because the NCAA considers men's and women's indoor track and field and outdoor track and field as separate sports.

From 2012 to 2014, Lawi Lalang won seven NCAA individual titles in long-distance running, the most of any Wildcat track and field athlete.

== Postseason ==
=== AIAW ===
The Wildcats have had five AIAW individual All-Americans finishing in the top six at the AIAW indoor or outdoor championships.

AIAW All-Americans
Championships	Name	Event	Place
1980 Outdoor	Joan Hansen	3000 meters	4th
1980 Outdoor	Meg Ritchie	Shot put	1st
1980 Outdoor	Meg Ritchie	Discus throw	1st
1981 Indoor	Joan Hansen	1500 meters	2nd
1981 Indoor	Marjorie Kaput	5000 meters	6th
1981 Indoor	Meg Ritchie	Shot put	1st
1981 Outdoor	Joan Hansen	3000 meters	2nd
1981 Outdoor	Denise Waddy	400 meters hurdles	6th
1981 Outdoor	Meg Ritchie	Shot put	1st
1981 Outdoor	Meg Ritchie	Discus throw	2nd
1982 Indoor	Gale Charmaine	High jump	1st

=== NCAA ===
As of August 2025, a total of 100 men and 73 women have achieved individual first-team All-American status at the Division I men's outdoor, women's outdoor, men's indoor, or women's indoor national championships (using the modern criteria of top-8 placing regardless of athlete nationality).

First team NCAA All-Americans
Team	Championships	Name	Event	Place	Ref.
Men's	1932 Outdoor	Clyde Blanchard	400 meters hurdles	3rd	
Men's	1932 Outdoor	Clarence Sample	Javelin throw	2nd	
Men's	1933 Outdoor	Clarence Sample	Javelin throw	2nd	
Men's	1939 Outdoor	Gherald Hoopes	Long jump	6th	
Men's	1950 Outdoor	Parker Gregg	Discus throw	7th	
Men's	1954 Outdoor	Mal Andrews	Long jump	5th	
Men's	1955 Outdoor	Mal Andrews	Long jump	2nd	
Men's	1958 Outdoor	Ray Hiscock	Shot put	5th	
Men's	1959 Outdoor	Ray Hiscock	Shot put	3rd	
Men's	1959 Outdoor	Jim Burke	Discus throw	6th	
Men's	1960 Outdoor	Larry Dunn	100 meters	3rd	
Men's	1960 Outdoor	Ray Hughes	3000 meters steeplechase	4th	
Men's	1960 Outdoor	Jim Burke	Shot put	7th	
Men's	1960 Outdoor	Jim Burke	Discus throw	3rd	
Men's	1961 Outdoor	Larry Dunn	200 meters	3rd	
Men's	1961 Outdoor	Karl Johnstone	Discus throw	2nd	
Men's	1962 Outdoor	Karl Johnstone	Discus throw	3rd	
Men's	1963 Outdoor	Bob Hildt	110 meters hurdles	8th	
Men's	1964 Outdoor	Gayle Hopkins	Long jump	1st	
Men's	1964 Outdoor	Gayle Hopkins	Triple jump	4th	
Men's	1965 Outdoor	Ed Martensen	Pole vault	5th	
Men's	1965 Outdoor	Jim McArdle	Discus throw	4th	
Men's	1965 Outdoor	John Tushaus	Javelin throw	1st	
Men's	1965 Outdoor	Glenn Winningham	Javelin throw	4th	
Men's	1966 Outdoor	Dale Frederick	110 meters hurdles	2nd	
Men's	1966 Outdoor	John Tushaus	Javelin throw	2nd	
Men's	1967 Outdoor	Ed Caruthers	High jump	2nd	
Men's	1969 Outdoor	Roy Waddell	Javelin throw	5th	
Men's	1971 Indoor	Lorenzo Allen	High jump	2nd	
Men's	1971 Outdoor	Lorenzo Allen	High jump	2nd	
Men's	1972 Outdoor	Steve Gunzel	Discus throw	3rd	
Men's	1972 Outdoor	Sam Strickland	Javelin throw	5th	
Men's	1973 Indoor	Robert Joseph	High jump	5th	
Men's	1973 Outdoor	Robert Joseph	High jump	3rd	
Men's	1973 Outdoor	Steve Gunzel	Discus throw	6th	
Men's	1974 Outdoor	Wardell Gilbreath	200 meters	3rd	
Men's	1974 Outdoor	Larry Brown	200 meters	4th	
Men's	1975 Indoor	Tony Lawson	400 meters	4th	
Men's	1975 Outdoor	Larry Brown	200 meters	6th	
Men's	1976 Outdoor	Wardell Gilbreath	200 meters	3rd	
Men's	1976 Outdoor	Terry Cotton	5000 meters	4th	
Men's	1976 Outdoor	Ed Mendoza	10,000 meters	7th	
Men's	1977 Outdoor	Ed Arriola	1500 meters	6th	
Men's	1978 Outdoor	Roger Curtis	High jump	6th	
Men's	1978 Outdoor	Steve Jacobs	Decathlon	7th	
Men's	1979 Outdoor	Paul Becklund	1500 meters	8th	
Men's	1979 Outdoor	Thom Hunt	3000 meters steeplechase	4th	
Men's	1979 Outdoor	James Frazier	High jump	2nd	
Men's	1979 Outdoor	Roger Curtis	High jump	8th	
Men's	1979 Outdoor	Steve Jacobs	Decathlon	2nd	
Men's	1980 Outdoor	Thom Hunt	3000 meters steeplechase	4th	
Men's	1980 Outdoor	James Frazier	High jump	2nd	
Men's	1981 Outdoor	Peter Okodogbe	100 meters	8th	
Men's	1981 Outdoor	Harrison Koroso	3000 meters steeplechase	4th	
Men's	1981 Outdoor	Tony Gaston	4 × 100 meters relay	7th	
Men's	1981 Outdoor	Rod Barksdale	4 × 100 meters relay	7th	
Men's	1981 Outdoor	Raymond Threatt	4 × 100 meters relay	7th	
Men's	1981 Outdoor	Peter Okodogbe	4 × 100 meters relay	7th	
Men's	1981 Outdoor	Hope Ezeigbo	4 × 400 meters relay	6th	
Men's	1981 Outdoor	Randy Redditt	4 × 400 meters relay	6th	
Men's	1981 Outdoor	Felix Imadiyi	4 × 400 meters relay	6th	
Men's	1981 Outdoor	Rod Barksdale	4 × 400 meters relay	6th	
Men's	1982 Outdoor	Jeff Hess	3000 meters steeplechase	7th	
Men's	1982 Outdoor	Vance Johnson	Long jump	1st	
Women's	1982 Outdoor	Robin Marks	400 meters hurdles	2nd	
Women's	1982 Outdoor	Meg Ritchie	Shot put	1st	
Women's	1982 Outdoor	Meg Ritchie	Discus throw	1st	
Women's	1982 Outdoor	Martha Hart	Javelin throw	5th	
Women's	1983 Indoor	Meg Ritchie	Shot put	1st	
Men's	1983 Outdoor	Jeff Hess	3000 meters steeplechase	7th	
Women's	1983 Outdoor	Anthea James	3000 meters	7th	
Women's	1983 Outdoor	Katrena Johnson	High jump	3rd	
Women's	1983 Outdoor	Meg Ritchie	Shot put	5th	
Women's	1983 Outdoor	Meg Ritchie	Discus throw	3rd	
Women's	1983 Outdoor	Donna Mayhew	Javelin throw	3rd	
Women's	1984 Indoor	Laura Lim	55 meters hurdles	5th	
Women's	1984 Indoor	Ruth Waithera	400 meters	1st	
Men's	1984 Outdoor	John Johnson	110 meters hurdles	6th	
Men's	1984 Outdoor	Rod Barksdale	200 meters	6th	
Men's	1984 Outdoor	Bob Ingram	3000 meters steeplechase	7th	
Men's	1984 Outdoor	Tom Ansberry	10,000 meters	4th	
Men's	1984 Outdoor	Vance Johnson	4 × 100 meters relay	3rd	
Men's	1984 Outdoor	Rod Barksdale	4 × 100 meters relay	3rd	
Men's	1984 Outdoor	Lucius Miller	4 × 100 meters relay	3rd	
Men's	1984 Outdoor	John Johnson	4 × 100 meters relay	3rd	
Men's	1984 Outdoor	Vance Johnson	Long jump	2nd	
Women's	1984 Outdoor	Ruth Waithera	400 meters	6th	
Women's	1984 Outdoor	Michelle Walsh	4 × 400 meters relay	5th	
Women's	1984 Outdoor	Janis Vetter	4 × 400 meters relay	5th	
Women's	1984 Outdoor	Nedrea Rodgers	4 × 400 meters relay	5th	
Women's	1984 Outdoor	Ruth Waithera	4 × 400 meters relay	5th	
Women's	1984 Outdoor	Camille Harding	High jump	7th	
Women's	1985 Indoor	Michelle Walsh	400 meters	6th	
Women's	1985 Indoor	Lorraine Costanzo	Shot put	2nd	
Women's	1985 Indoor	Carla Garrett	Shot put	3rd	
Men's	1985 Outdoor	Maurice Crumby	High jump	7th	
Men's	1985 Outdoor	Todd Kaufman	Discus throw	6th	
Women's	1985 Outdoor	Katrena Johnson	High jump	1st	
Women's	1985 Outdoor	Maryse Ewanje-Epee	High jump	2nd	
Women's	1985 Outdoor	Camille Harding	High jump	3rd	
Women's	1985 Outdoor	Carla Garrett	Shot put	2nd	
Women's	1985 Outdoor	Lorraine Costanzo	Shot put	3rd	
Women's	1985 Outdoor	Carla Garrett	Discus throw	7th	
Women's	1985 Outdoor	Maryse Ewanje-Epee	Heptathlon	4th	
Women's	1986 Indoor	Katrena Johnson	High jump	1st	
Women's	1986 Indoor	Carole Jones	Triple jump	5th	
Women's	1986 Indoor	Carla Garrett	Shot put	2nd	
Women's	1986 Outdoor	Katrena Johnson	High jump	2nd	
Women's	1986 Outdoor	Carla Garrett	Shot put	4th	
Women's	1986 Outdoor	Lynda Hughes	Javelin throw	8th	
Women's	1987 Indoor	Katrena Johnson	High jump	2nd	
Women's	1987 Indoor	Carole Jones	Triple jump	3rd	
Women's	1987 Indoor	Carla Garrett	Shot put	2nd	
Women's	1987 Outdoor	Katrena Johnson	High jump	6th	
Women's	1987 Outdoor	Carole Jones	Long jump	4th	
Women's	1987 Outdoor	Carole Jones	Triple jump	8th	
Women's	1987 Outdoor	Carla Garrett	Shot put	4th	
Women's	1987 Outdoor	Erin Dougherty	Heptathlon	7th	
Women's	1988 Indoor	Christina Fink	High jump	3rd	
Men's	1988 Outdoor	Matt Giusto	5000 meters	1st	
Men's	1988 Outdoor	Derek Huff	Decathlon	2nd	
Women's	1988 Outdoor	Christina Fink	High jump	7th	
Men's	1989 Indoor	Jack Trahan	Shot put	7th	
Women's	1989 Indoor	Bridget Smyth	Mile run	8th	
Women's	1989 Indoor	Carla Garrett	Shot put	1st	
Men's	1989 Outdoor	Marc Davis	5000 meters	1st	
Men's	1989 Outdoor	Kirk Dyer	4 × 100 meters relay	7th	
Men's	1989 Outdoor	Percy Knox	4 × 100 meters relay	7th	
Men's	1989 Outdoor	David Lockhart	4 × 100 meters relay	7th	
Men's	1989 Outdoor	Marc Olivier	4 × 100 meters relay	7th	
Men's	1989 Outdoor	Derek Huff	Decathlon	1st	
Women's	1989 Outdoor	Carla Garrett	Shot put	1st	
Women's	1989 Outdoor	Carla Garrett	Discus throw	1st	
Women's	1989 Outdoor	Michelle Brotherton	Discus throw	4th	
Women's	1990 Indoor	Julieann Broughton	High jump	2nd	
Men's	1990 Outdoor	Michael Bates	100 meters	7th	
Men's	1990 Outdoor	Michael Bates	200 meters	6th	
Men's	1990 Outdoor	Marc Olivier	4 × 100 meters relay	2nd	
Men's	1990 Outdoor	Percy Knox	4 × 100 meters relay	2nd	
Men's	1990 Outdoor	Michael Bates	4 × 100 meters relay	2nd	
Men's	1990 Outdoor	James Bullock	4 × 100 meters relay	2nd	
Men's	1990 Outdoor	Jack Trahan	Shot put	6th	
Women's	1990 Outdoor	Karen Pugh	Discus throw	8th	
Women's	1990 Outdoor	Louise Perrault	Javelin throw	5th	
Men's	1991 Indoor	Percy Knox	Long jump	5th	
Women's	1991 Indoor	Bridget Smyth	Mile run	3rd	
Women's	1991 Indoor	Tanya Hughes	High jump	1st	
Men's	1991 Outdoor	Michael Bates	200 meters	6th	
Men's	1991 Outdoor	Rene Schmidheiny	Decathlon	7th	
Women's	1991 Outdoor	Tanya Hughes	High jump	1st	
Men's	1992 Indoor	Marc Davis	5000 meters	2nd	
Women's	1992 Indoor	Tanya Hughes	High jump	5th	
Men's	1992 Outdoor	Marc Davis	3000 meters steeplechase	1st	
Women's	1992 Outdoor	Katie Williams	10,000 meters	8th	
Women's	1992 Outdoor	Tanya Hughes	High jump	1st	
Women's	1992 Outdoor	J.C. Broughton	High jump	2nd	
Women's	1993 Indoor	J.C. Broughton	High jump	1st	
Women's	1993 Indoor	Tanya Hughes	High jump	3rd	
Men's	1993 Outdoor	Martin Keino	3000 meters steeplechase	5th	
Men's	1993 Outdoor	Alex Krichenko	Javelin throw	8th	
Men's	1993 Outdoor	Matt Dallow	Decathlon	7th	
Women's	1993 Outdoor	Brenda Sleeuwenhoek	5000 meters	3rd	
Women's	1993 Outdoor	Katie Williams	10,000 meters	6th	
Women's	1993 Outdoor	Tanya Hughes	High jump	1st	
Women's	1993 Outdoor	J.C. Broughton	High jump	3rd	
Men's	1994 Indoor	Martin Keino	3000 meters	4th	
Women's	1994 Indoor	Karen Bennett	800 meters	2nd	
Women's	1994 Indoor	Brenda Sleeuwenhoek	5000 meters	1st	
Women's	1994 Indoor	J.C. Broughton	High jump	2nd	
Women's	1994 Indoor	Tanya Hughes	High jump	7th	
Men's	1994 Outdoor	David Loshonkohl	Hammer throw	4th	
Men's	1994 Outdoor	Alex Krichenko	Javelin throw	5th	
Women's	1994 Outdoor	Brenda Sleeuwenhoek	5000 meters	4th	
Women's	1994 Outdoor	Tanya Hughes	High jump	4th	
Women's	1995 Indoor	Suzanne Castuita	3000 meters	7th	
Women's	1995 Indoor	Viola Schaffer	5000 meters	5th	
Men's	1995 Outdoor	Martin Keino	5000 meters	1st	
Men's	1995 Outdoor	David Loshonkohl	Hammer throw	6th	
Men's	1995 Outdoor	Alex Krichenko	Javelin throw	4th	
Women's	1995 Outdoor	Michelle Johnson	400 meters hurdles	7th	
Women's	1995 Outdoor	Viola Schaffer	10,000 meters	4th	
Women's	1995 Outdoor	Rebecca Butt	High jump	7th	
Men's	1996 Indoor	Bob Keino	3000 meters	5th	
Men's	1996 Indoor	Chima Ugwu	Shot put	4th	
Women's	1996 Indoor	Viola Schaffer	5000 meters	5th	
Men's	1996 Outdoor	Dominic Johnson	Pole vault	3rd	
Men's	1996 Outdoor	Chima Ugwu	Shot put	2nd	
Men's	1996 Outdoor	Tapio Kolunsarka	Hammer throw	3rd	
Women's	1996 Outdoor	Michelle Johnson	400 meters hurdles	6th	
Women's	1997 Indoor	Amy Skieresz	5000 meters	1st	
Men's	1997 Outdoor	Bob Keino	1500 meters	5th	
Men's	1997 Outdoor	Tapio Kolunsarka	Hammer throw	3rd	
Men's	1997 Outdoor	Dominic Johnson	Decathlon	6th	
Women's	1997 Outdoor	Amy Skieresz	5000 meters	1st	
Women's	1997 Outdoor	Amy Skieresz	10,000 meters	1st	
Women's	1997 Outdoor	Erin Aldrich	High jump	3rd	
Men's	1998 Indoor	Abdi Abdirahman	5000 meters	7th	
Men's	1998 Indoor	Dominic Johnson	Pole vault	2nd	
Men's	1998 Indoor	Chima Ugwu	Shot put	6th	
Women's	1998 Indoor	Amy Skieresz	5000 meters	1st	
Men's	1998 Outdoor	Patrick Nduwimana	800 meters	7th	
Men's	1998 Outdoor	Abdi Abdirahman	5000 meters	2nd	
Men's	1998 Outdoor	Abdi Abdirahman	10,000 meters	6th	
Men's	1998 Outdoor	Chima Ugwu	Shot put	2nd	
Men's	1998 Outdoor	Esko Mikkola	Javelin throw	1st	
Men's	1998 Outdoor	Klaus Ambroach	Decathlon	1st	
Women's	1998 Outdoor	Carolyn Jackson	400 meters	5th	
Women's	1998 Outdoor	Amy Skieresz	5000 meters	1st	
Women's	1998 Outdoor	Amy Skieresz	10,000 meters	1st	
Men's	1999 Indoor	Abdi Abdirahman	5000 meters	6th	
Men's	1999 Indoor	Jeff Dutoit	Pole vault	3rd	
Women's	1999 Indoor	Carolyn Jackson	400 meters	8th	
Men's	1999 Outdoor	Patrick Nduwimana	800 meters	2nd	
Men's	1999 Outdoor	Abdi Abdirahman	10,000 meters	6th	
Men's	1999 Outdoor	Jeff Dutoit	Pole vault	7th	
Men's	1999 Outdoor	Esko Mikkola	Javelin throw	2nd	
Women's	1999 Outdoor	Maureen Griffin	Hammer throw	8th	
Men's	2000 Indoor	Jeff Dutoit	Pole vault	8th	
Women's	2000 Indoor	Brianna Glenn	60 meters	5th	
Women's	2000 Indoor	Tara Chaplin	5000 meters	5th	
Men's	2000 Outdoor	Patrick Nduwimana	800 meters	1st	
Men's	2000 Outdoor	Jeff Dutoit	Pole vault	3rd	
Men's	2000 Outdoor	Esko Mikkola	Javelin throw	1st	
Women's	2000 Outdoor	Brianna Glenn	100 meters	4th	
Women's	2000 Outdoor	Carolyn Jackson	400 meters	5th	
Women's	2000 Outdoor	Andrea Neary	Pole vault	6th	
Men's	2001 Indoor	Patrick Nduwimana	800 meters	1st	
Men's	2001 Indoor	Matt Lea	4 × 400 meters relay	4th	
Men's	2001 Indoor	Mike Kenyon	4 × 400 meters relay	4th	
Men's	2001 Indoor	Jules Doumbia	4 × 400 meters relay	4th	
Men's	2001 Indoor	Patrick Nduwiman	4 × 400 meters relay	4th	
Women's	2001 Indoor	Brianna Glenn	60 meters	3rd	
Women's	2001 Indoor	Tara Chaplin	5000 meters	2nd	
Women's	2001 Indoor	Andrea Dutoit	Pole vault	2nd	
Women's	2001 Indoor	Amy Linnen	Pole vault	5th	
Women's	2001 Indoor	Brianna Glenn	Long jump	4th	
Women's	2001 Outdoor	Brianna Glenn	100 meters	3rd	
Women's	2001 Outdoor	Brianna Glenn	200 meters	1st	
Women's	2001 Outdoor	Andrea Dutoit	Pole vault	1st	
Women's	2001 Outdoor	Amy Linnen	Pole vault	5th	
Women's	2001 Outdoor	Brianna Glenn	Long jump	1st	
Women's	2001 Outdoor	Angela Foster	Hammer throw	5th	
Women's	2002 Indoor	Brianna Glenn	60 meters	4th	
Women's	2002 Indoor	Brianna Glenn	200 meters	5th	
Women's	2002 Indoor	Amy Linnen	Pole vault	1st	
Men's	2002 Outdoor	Mike Kenyon	400 meters	7th	
Women's	2002 Outdoor	Brianna Glenn	100 meters	4th	
Women's	2002 Outdoor	Brianna Glenn	200 meters	6th	
Women's	2002 Outdoor	Brianna Glenn	Long jump	3rd	
Women's	2002 Outdoor	Angela Foster	Hammer throw	8th	
Men's	2003 Indoor	Sean Shields	Shot put	6th	
Women's	2003 Indoor	Amy Linnen	Pole vault	6th	
Men's	2003 Outdoor	Robert Cheseret	5000 meters	3rd	
Women's	2003 Outdoor	Connie Jerz	Pole vault	2nd	
Women's	2003 Outdoor	Ilona Rutjes	Discus throw	5th	
Men's	2004 Indoor	Robert Cheseret	3000 meters	4th	
Women's	2004 Indoor	Connie Jerz	Pole vault	3rd	
Men's	2004 Outdoor	Robert Cheseret	5000 meters	1st	
Men's	2004 Outdoor	Kyle Goklish	5000 meters	6th	
Men's	2004 Outdoor	Robert Cheseret	10,000 meters	2nd	
Women's	2004 Outdoor	Connie Jerz	Pole vault	7th	
Men's	2005 Indoor	Jonah Maiyo	Mile run	3rd	
Men's	2005 Indoor	Robert Cheseret	5000 meters	2nd	
Men's	2005 Indoor	Sean Shields	Shot put	3rd	
Women's	2005 Indoor	Connie Jerz	Pole vault	3rd	
Men's	2005 Outdoor	Robert Cheseret	5000 meters	6th	
Men's	2005 Outdoor	Robert Cheseret	10,000 meters	1st	
Men's	2005 Outdoor	Sean Shields	Shot put	4th	
Men's	2005 Outdoor	Adam Kuehl	Discus throw	4th	
Women's	2005 Outdoor	Ilona Rutjes	Discus throw	6th	
Men's	2006 Indoor	Robert Cheseret	3000 meters	2nd	
Men's	2006 Indoor	Sean Shields	Shot put	3rd	
Men's	2006 Indoor	Jake Arnold	Heptathlon	5th	
Men's	2006 Outdoor	Obed Mutanya	5000 meters	4th	
Men's	2006 Outdoor	Robert Cheseret	5000 meters	7th	
Men's	2006 Outdoor	Sean Shields	Shot put	3rd	
Men's	2006 Outdoor	Adam Kuehl	Discus throw	2nd	
Men's	2006 Outdoor	Sean Shields	Discus throw	6th	
Men's	2006 Outdoor	Jake Arnold	Decathlon	1st	
Women's	2006 Outdoor	Rachel Varner	Discus throw	8th	
Men's	2007 Indoor	Obed Mutanya	3000 meters	5th	
Men's	2007 Indoor	Adam Kuehl	Shot put	5th	
Men's	2007 Indoor	Shawn Best	Shot put	6th	
Men's	2007 Indoor	Jake Arnold	Heptathlon	2nd	
Men's	2007 Outdoor	Obed Mutanya	5000 meters	6th	
Men's	2007 Outdoor	Marcus Tyus	4 × 100 meters relay	8th	
Men's	2007 Outdoor	Xuehan Xiong	4 × 100 meters relay	8th	
Men's	2007 Outdoor	Antoine Cason	4 × 100 meters relay	8th	
Men's	2007 Outdoor	Troy Harris	4 × 100 meters relay	8th	
Men's	2007 Outdoor	Adam Kuehl	Discus throw	5th	
Men's	2007 Outdoor	Jake Arnold	Decathlon	1st	
Men's	2008 Indoor	Bobby McCoy	400 meters	4th	
Men's	2008 Indoor	Zack Lloyd	Shot put	5th	
Women's	2008 Indoor	Jasmin Day	High jump	6th	
Women's	2008 Indoor	Shevell Quinley	Pentathlon	3rd	
Men's	2008 Outdoor	Zack Lloyd	Shot put	4th	
Men's	2008 Outdoor	Shawn Best	Shot put	5th	
Men's	2008 Outdoor	Jarred Sola	Shot put	7th	
Women's	2008 Outdoor	Liz Patterson	High jump	1st	
Women's	2008 Outdoor	Jasmin Day	High jump	7th	
Men's	2009 Indoor	Zack Lloyd	Shot put	3rd	
Women's	2009 Indoor	Liz Patterson	High jump	2nd	
Women's	2009 Indoor	Gabriellea Duclos	Pole vault	4th	
Men's	2009 Outdoor	Luis Rivera-Morales	Long jump	6th	
Men's	2009 Outdoor	Zack Lloyd	Shot put	2nd	
Women's	2009 Outdoor	Liz Patterson	High jump	2nd	
Women's	2009 Outdoor	Gabriella Duclos	Pole vault	7th	
Women's	2009 Outdoor	Shevell Quinley	Heptathlon	8th	
Men's	2010 Indoor	Nick Ross	High jump	7th	
Men's	2010 Indoor	Luis Rivera-Morales	Long jump	6th	
Women's	2010 Indoor	Liz Patterson	High jump	1st	
Women's	2010 Indoor	Brigetta Barrett	High jump	4th	
Men's	2010 Outdoor	Nick Ross	High jump	7th	
Women's	2010 Outdoor	Christina Rogers	800 meters	4th	
Women's	2010 Outdoor	Liz Patterson	High jump	2nd	
Women's	2010 Outdoor	Brigetta Barrett	High jump	7th	
Women's	2010 Outdoor	Julie Labonte	Shot put	4th	
Men's	2011 Indoor	Stephen Sambu	5000 meters	3rd	
Men's	2011 Indoor	Abdi Hassan	Distance medley relay	5th	
Men's	2011 Indoor	Sean Delfani	Distance medley relay	5th	
Men's	2011 Indoor	James Eichberger	Distance medley relay	5th	
Men's	2011 Indoor	Lawi Lalang	Distance medley relay	5th	
Men's	2011 Indoor	Edgar Rivera	High jump	6th	
Men's	2011 Indoor	Nick Ross	High jump	8th	
Women's	2011 Indoor	Christina Rodgers	800 meters	5th	
Women's	2011 Indoor	Brigetta Barrett	High jump	1st	
Women's	2011 Indoor	Julie Labonte	Shot put	1st	
Men's	2011 Outdoor	Abdi Hassan	1500 meters	3rd	
Men's	2011 Outdoor	Lawi Lalang	5000 meters	2nd	
Men's	2011 Outdoor	Stephen Sambu	10,000 meters	3rd	
Men's	2011 Outdoor	Nick Ross	High jump	3rd	
Men's	2011 Outdoor	Bozidar Antunovic	Shot put	7th	
Women's	2011 Outdoor	LaTisha Holden	100 meters hurdles	4th	
Women's	2011 Outdoor	Jennifer Bergman	10,000 meters	3rd	
Women's	2011 Outdoor	Brigetta Barrett	High jump	1st	
Women's	2011 Outdoor	Julie Labonte	Shot put	1st	
Women's	2011 Outdoor	Baillie Gibson	Discus throw	5th	
Men's	2012 Indoor	Lawi Lalang	3000 meters	1st	
Men's	2012 Indoor	Stephen Sambu	3000 meters	6th	
Men's	2012 Indoor	Lawi Lalang	5000 meters	1st	
Men's	2012 Indoor	Stephen Sambu	5000 meters	3rd	
Men's	2012 Indoor	Nick Ross	High jump	1st	
Men's	2012 Indoor	Edgar Rivera	High jump	7th	
Women's	2012 Indoor	Elvin Kibet	5000 meters	6th	
Women's	2012 Indoor	Brigetta Barrett	High jump	1st	
Women's	2012 Indoor	Julie Labonte	Shot put	3rd	
Men's	2012 Outdoor	Lawi Lalang	5000 meters	3rd	
Men's	2012 Outdoor	Stephen Sambu	5000 meters	5th	
Men's	2012 Outdoor	Stephen Sambu	10,000 meters	2nd	
Men's	2012 Outdoor	Nick Ross	High jump	4th	
Men's	2012 Outdoor	Bozidar Antunovic	Shot put	6th	
Men's	2012 Outdoor	Tyler Johnson	Hammer throw	8th	
Women's	2012 Outdoor	Elvin Kibet	10,000 meters	7th	
Women's	2012 Outdoor	Shapri Romero	4 × 400 meters relay	6th	
Women's	2012 Outdoor	Echos Blevins	4 × 400 meters relay	6th	
Women's	2012 Outdoor	Tamara Pridgett	4 × 400 meters relay	6th	
Women's	2012 Outdoor	Georganne Moline	4 × 400 meters relay	6th	
Women's	2012 Outdoor	Brigetta Barrett	High jump	1st	
Men's	2013 Indoor	Lawi Lalang	Mile run	1st	
Men's	2013 Indoor	Lawi Lalang	3000 meters	1st	
Men's	2013 Indoor	Edgar Rivera	High jump	7th	
Women's	2013 Indoor	Georganne Moline	400 meters	5th	
Women's	2013 Indoor	Brigetta Barrett	High jump	1st	
Women's	2013 Indoor	Julie Labonte	Shot put	3rd	
Women's	2013 Indoor	Alyssa Hasslen	Shot put	4th	
Men's	2013 Outdoor	Lawi Lalang	5000 meters	1st	
Men's	2013 Outdoor	Lawi Lalang	10,000 meters	1st	
Men's	2013 Outdoor	Edgar Rivera	High jump	8th	
Women's	2013 Outdoor	Georganne Moline	400 meters hurdles	2nd	
Women's	2013 Outdoor	Jennifer Bergman	10,000 meters	6th	
Women's	2013 Outdoor	Brigetta Barrett	High jump	1st	
Women's	2013 Outdoor	Julie Labonte	Shot put	5th	
Women's	2013 Outdoor	Julie Labonte	Discus throw	2nd	
Men's	2014 Indoor	Lawi Lalang	Mile run	2nd	
Men's	2014 Indoor	Lawi Lalang	5000 meters	2nd	
Men's	2014 Indoor	Nick Ross	High jump	2nd	
Men's	2014 Outdoor	Lawi Lalang	1500 meters	2nd	
Men's	2014 Outdoor	Lawi Lalang	5000 meters	1st	
Men's	2014 Outdoor	Nick Ross	High jump	3rd	
Women's	2014 Outdoor	Elvin Kibet	10,000 meters	4th	
Women's	2014 Outdoor	Julie Labonte	Shot put	4th	
Women's	2015 Indoor	Nnenya Hailey	60 meters hurdles	7th	
Men's	2015 Outdoor	Collins Kibet	800 meters	7th	
Women's	2015 Outdoor	Nnenya Hailey	400 meters hurdles	6th	
Men's	2016 Indoor	Pau Tonnesen	Heptathlon	2nd	
Women's	2016 Indoor	Tatum Waggoner	4 × 400 meters relay	8th	
Women's	2016 Indoor	Nnenya Hailey	4 × 400 meters relay	8th	
Women's	2016 Indoor	Gia Trevisan	4 × 400 meters relay	8th	
Women's	2016 Indoor	Sage Watson	4 × 400 meters relay	8th	
Men's	2016 Outdoor	Gerhard de Beer	Discus throw	4th	
Women's	2016 Outdoor	Sage Watson	400 meters hurdles	3rd	
Men's	2017 Indoor	Justice Summerset	High jump	7th	
Men's	2017 Indoor	Aaron Castle	Shot put	8th	
Women's	2017 Indoor	Sage Watson	400 meters	3rd	
Women's	2017 Indoor	Lisanne Hagens	High jump	8th	
Men's	2017 Outdoor	Justice Summerset	High jump	3rd	
Women's	2017 Outdoor	Sage Watson	400 meters hurdles	1st	
Men's	2018 Indoor	Jordan Geist	Shot put	5th	
Men's	2018 Outdoor	Maksims Sincukovs	400 meters hurdles	7th	
Men's	2018 Outdoor	Jordan Geist	Shot put	5th	
Men's	2019 Indoor	Carlos Villarreal	Mile run	4th	
Men's	2019 Indoor	Jordan Geist	Shot put	5th	
Women's	2019 Indoor	Lillian Lowe	High jump	7th	
Men's	2019 Outdoor	James Smith II	400 meters hurdles	5th	
Men's	2019 Outdoor	Bailey Roth	3000 meters steeplechase	5th	
Men's	2019 Outdoor	Jordan Geist	Shot put	3rd	
Women's	2019 Outdoor	Karla Teran	High jump	5th	
Men's	2021 Indoor	Israel Oloyede	Weight throw	2nd	
Women's	2021 Indoor	Lillian Lowe	High jump	7th	
Women's	2021 Indoor	Samantha Noennig	Shot put	2nd	
Men's	2021 Outdoor	Maj Williams	4 × 400 meters relay	6th	
Men's	2021 Outdoor	Calvin Wilson	4 × 400 meters relay	6th	
Men's	2021 Outdoor	Isaac Davis	4 × 400 meters relay	6th	
Men's	2021 Outdoor	Johnnie Blockburger	4 × 400 meters relay	6th	
Men's	2021 Outdoor	Jordan Geist	Shot put	3rd	
Men's	2021 Outdoor	Jordan Geist	Hammer throw	8th	
Women's	2021 Outdoor	Shannon Meisberger	400 meters hurdles	2nd	
Women's	2021 Outdoor	Samantha Noennig	Shot put	7th	
Men's	2022 Indoor	Jordan Geist	Shot put	3rd	
Women's	2022 Indoor	Samantha Noennig	Shot put	4th	
Women's	2022 Outdoor	Shannon Meisberger	400 meters hurdles	8th	
Men's	2023 Indoor	Jordan Geist	Shot put	1st	
Women's	2023 Indoor	Talie Bonds	60 meters hurdles	7th	
Men's	2023 Outdoor	Jordan Geist	Shot put	1st	
Men's	2023 Outdoor	Jordan Geist	Hammer throw	3rd	
Women's	2023 Outdoor	Talie Bonds	100 meters hurdles	4th	
Women's	2025 Indoor	Emma Gates	High jump	4th	
Men's	2025 Outdoor	Aidan Gravelle	100 meters	4th	
Men's	2025 Outdoor	Zachary Extine	110 meters hurdles	2nd	
Men's	2025 Outdoor	Zachary Extine	110 meters hurdles	2nd	
Women's	2025 Outdoor	Jade Brown	100 meters	8th	
Women's	2026 Indoor	Emma Gates	High jump	4th	
Women's	2026 Indoor	Tapenisa Havea	Shot put	14th	
Men's	2026 Indoor	Mason Lawyer	60 meters	8th	

== See also ==
- Category:Arizona Wildcats men's track and field athletes (44)
- Category:Arizona Wildcats women's track and field athletes (28)
