= Arizona Wildcats =

University of Arizona athletic teams

- University: University of Arizona
- Nickname: Wildcats
- NCAA: Division I (FBS)
- Conference: Big 12 (primary); Mountain Pacific Sports Federation (indoor track & field)
- Athletic director: Desiree Reed-Francois
- Location: Tucson, Arizona
- Varsity teams: 22 (9 Men's, 13 Women's)
- Football stadium: Casino Del Sol Stadium
- Basketball arena: McKale Center
- Baseball stadium: Hi Corbett Field
- Colors: Cardinal and navy
- Mascot: Wilbur and Wilma
- Fight song: Fight! Wildcats! Fight! Bear Down
- Website: arizonawildcats.com

Big 12 logo in Arizona colors

The Arizona Wildcats are the athletic teams that represent the University of Arizona, located in Tucson. The Wildcats compete at the National Collegiate Athletic Association (NCAA) Division I (Football Bowl Subdivision (FBS) for college football) level as a member of the Big 12 Conference. Arizona's chief intercollegiate rival is the Arizona State Sun Devils, and the two universities' athletic departments compete against each other in multiple sports via the State Farm Territorial Cup Series.

== Athletic program ==
Beginning on August 2, 2024, the University of Arizona will participate in the NCAA's Division I-A in the Big 12 Conference alongside former Pac-12 members Arizona State, Colorado, and Utah. Arizona joined the Pac-8 in 1978 along with Arizona State University, bringing the conference to 10 teams and the new name of the Pac-10 (the conference became the Pac-12 with the additions of Colorado and Utah in 2011). The school colors are cardinal red and navy blue since 1900, though originally sage green and silver. The official fight song is "Fight! Wildcats! Fight!", though "Bear Down, Arizona!" is more commonly used and "Bear Down" is the university's slogan. On August 4, 2023, Arizona accepted an invite to join the Big 12 Conference, effective August 2, 2024.

=== History ===
The Wildcats name derived from a 1914 football game with then California champions Occidental College, where the Los Angeles Times asserted that Arizona "showed the fight of wildcats."

- The first sport to bring national recognition to UA was polo. The 1924 UA polo team captured the Western Collegiate Championship, and traveled to the east coast to present U.S. President Calvin Coolidge with a cowboy hat. The UA polo team faced Princeton University for the intercollegiate title and lost 6–2 and 8–0. With the onset of World War II, the UA was unable to continue sponsoring a polo team.

=== Mascot ===
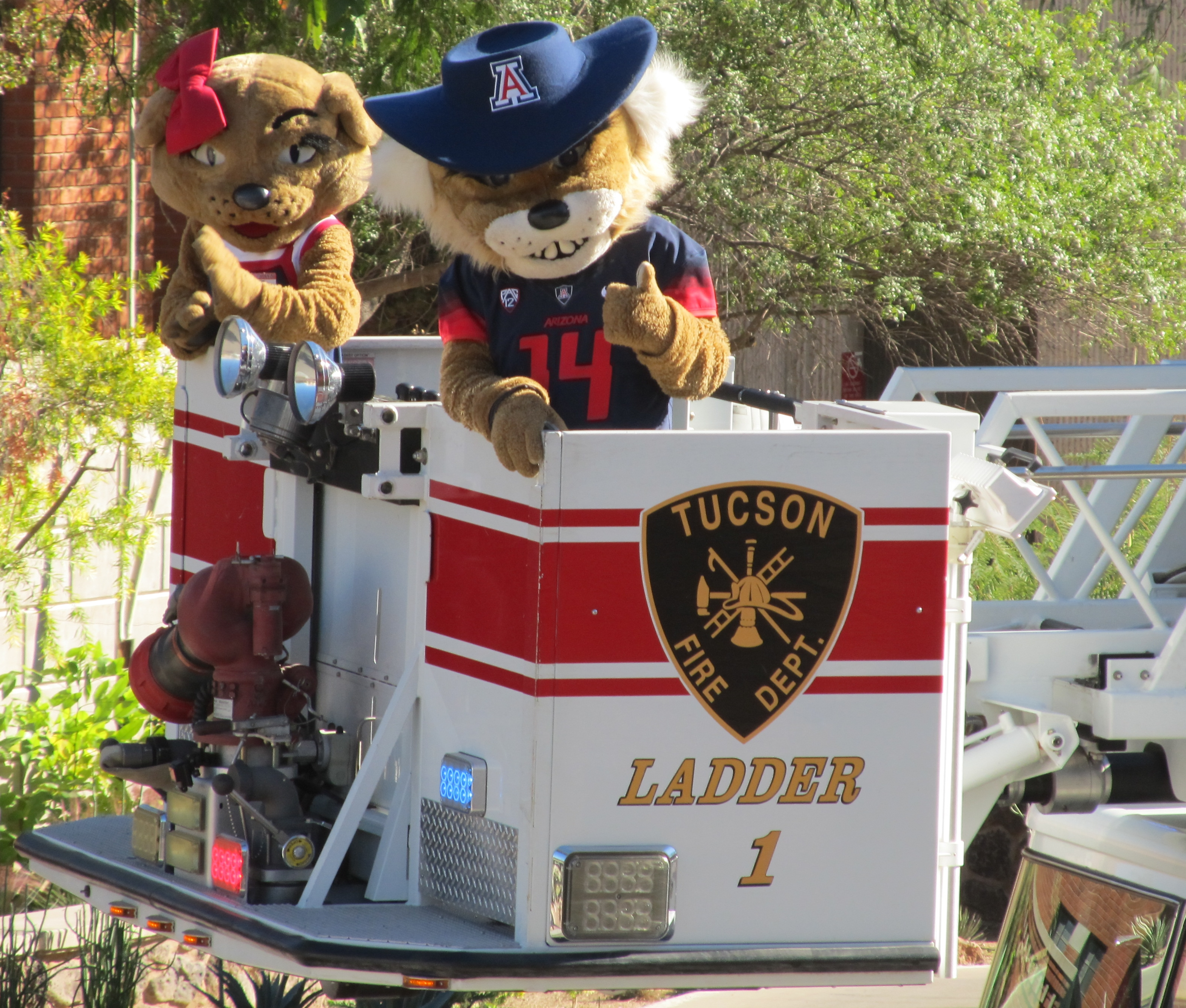
Wilma & Wilbur Wildcat at the 100th homecoming at the University of Arizona

The university mascots are anthropomorphized wildcats named Wilbur and Wilma. The identities of Wilbur and Wilma are kept secret through the year as the mascots appear only in costume, except typically until the last home basketball game of the year. Then, at halftime, Wilbur and Wilma are exposed. In 1986, Wilbur and Wilma, a longtime couple, were married. Together, Wilbur and Wilma appear along with the cheerleading squad at most Wildcat sporting events.

Arizona's first mascot was a real desert bobcat named "Rufus Arizona", introduced in 1915 and named after the university's president at the time, Rufus B. von KleinSmid.

=== Rivalries ===
A strong athletic rivalry exists between the University of Arizona Wildcats and Arizona State University Sun Devils, the state's only two Division I-FBS teams. The rivalry has been recognized as one of the most bitter rivalries in college sports. Both schools compete in the State Farm Territorial Cup Series, a head-to-head competition in 18 different sports. The football rivalry, nicknamed "The Duel in the Desert," is the oldest rivalry game in college football that features a trophy. The trophy awarded after each football game is the Territorial Cup. The teams first played in 1899, while the Territory of Arizona was an organized incorporated territory of the United States. The University of Arizona holds the all-time record (versus Arizona State) in all 3 major men's sports. Starting with basketball, they hold a record of 165–86 against ASU as of March 2026. They also hold the all-time record in football 52–46–1. Finally, Arizona holds the all-time record in baseball 267–237–1 as of April 14th, 2026.

Rivalries have also been created with other Pac-12 teams, especially University of California, Los Angeles which has been a consistent softball rival and was Arizona's main men's basketball rival from the late 1980s to the present. Arizona (and Arizona State) joined the Big 12 in the 2024–25 school year.

Arizona has two dormant rivalries with two other former Border Intercollegiate Athletic Association members, the New Mexico Lobos and Texas Tech Red Raiders, with the latter being a Big 12 opponent starting in 2024. Although Arizona remained in the Border Conference until it folded in 1961, New Mexico and Texas Tech withdrew from the Border Conference in 1952 and 1956 respectively. Both football programs remained on Arizona's schedule annually until the late 1970s, even though Texas Tech was a member of the Southwest Conference and New Mexico was a member of the Skyline Eight. In 1962, Arizona and New Mexico once again became conference rivals as charter members of the Western Athletic Conference. The Kit Carson Rifle was a traveling trophy exchanged between the Wildcats and Lobos from 1938 though 1990. Prior to the 1997 Insight.com Bowl, two schools announced the Kit Carson Rifle would not be awarded to the bowl game's winner because the trophy may have been used against Native Americans.

== Varsity sports ==
Men's sports	Women's sports
Baseball	Basketball
Basketball	Beach volleyball
Cross country	Cross country
Football	Golf
Golf	Gymnastics
Swimming & diving	Soccer
Tennis	Softball
Track and field^{†}	Swimming & diving
	Tennis
	Track and field^{†}
	Triathlon°
	Volleyball
† – Track and field includes both indoor and outdoor.
° – NCAA Emerging Sport for Women.

The University of Arizona sponsors teams in eight men's and twelve women's NCAA sanctioned sports.

=== Baseball ===
The baseball team is consistently one of the top teams in the country and has captured four national championship titles in 1976, 1980, 1986, and 2012. Arizona's baseball teams have appeared in the NCAA College World Series more than fifteen times. As of 2026, the team is coached by Chip Hale.

=== Men's basketball ===
The men's basketball team has been one of the nation's most successful programs since Lute Olson was hired as head coach in 1983 and was known as a national powerhouse in Division I men's basketball. From 1988 to 2007, the team amassed 20 consecutive 20-win seasons. Arizona reached the NCAA tournament in 25 consecutive years from 1985 to 2009. The Wildcats reached the Final Four of the NCAA tournament in 1988, 1994, 1997, 2001, and 2026.

In 1997, Arizona defeated the University of Kentucky, the defending national champions, to win the NCAA National Championship. Their championship team was led by future NBA players Mike Bibby and Michael Dickerson, as well as Final Four MVP Miles Simon. Bennett Davison and A. J. Bramlett rounded out the starting five. Other team members include Jason Terry, Eugene Edgerson and Josh Pastner. They defeated three number-one seeds in the same tournament: Kansas, North Carolina and Kentucky in the Championship Game. They won a thriller game in the Elite Eight in double overtime to take them to the Final Four.

After 25 years of coaching Arizona, Lute Olson retired shortly before the 2008–2009 season, largely due to on-going health issues. After several years of coaching by interim head coaches, Arizona named Sean Miller, formerly the head coach of Xavier, as the Wildcats head coach. In the NCAA Tournament, Sean Miller led the Wildcats to 3 Elite Eight appearances (2011, 2014, 2015).

After 12 years at the helm, Arizona and head coach Sean Miller parted ways. In April 2021, it was announced that Tommy Lloyd, the longtime top assistant coach at Gonzaga under Mark Few, would be the next head coach of Arizona men's basketball.

=== Women's basketball ===
The women's basketball program began intercollegiate play in 1972. Before that, it was an intramural sport. It has spent most of its history under the shadow of its men’s counterpart, though it has become more successful in recent years. The team has twice been runner-up in the Pac-10 (forerunner of the Pac-12) Conference Tournament and has made seven appearances in NCAA tournaments, and gone abroad to play in four foreign countries. The program has had nine coaches in its fifty-plus years, with Becky Burke as head coach since 2025. In 2021, under Adia Barnes, Arizona advanced to their first-ever Final Four. The Wildcats as of 2023 had an all-time win-loss record of 730–792.

=== Football ===
The football team began at the University of Arizona in 1899 under the nickname "Varsity" (a name kept until the 1914 season when the team earned the name "Wildcats"). During the 1980s under coach Larry Smith, Arizona began a resurgence of winning and was notably successful in the 1990s under Dick Tomey and his dominant "Desert Swarm" defense that was characterized by tough, hard-nosed tactics. During the 1992 season, the team used the “Swarm” to upset Washington]. In 1993, the Wildcats had their first 10-win season and captured a share of the Pac-10 title, and drubbed the powerhouse Miami Hurricanes in the 1994 Fiesta Bowl by a score of 29–0. In 1998, Arizona posted a school-record 12–1 season and made the 1998 Holiday Bowl in which it defeated the Nebraska Cornhuskers Despite a stellar season, the Wildcats lost to UCLA during the regular season that prevented an outright Pac-10 title and Rose Bowl appearance. After mediocre seasons in 1999 and 2000, Tomey stepped down as coach after the latter season.

The Wildcats would decline in wins during most of the 2000s after Tomey resigned. His successor, John Mackovic took over in 2001 and would become a disaster for the program, as he mistreated and abused players while continuously losing games, all of which led to his firing in 2003. In 2004, Arizona hired Mike Stoops, brother of then-Oklahoma coach Bob, to take over the program. Stoops would rebuild the team from 2004 to 2007 and earn signature wins during each of these seasons. In 2008, Stoops led the Wildcats to a win over BYU in the Las Vegas Bowl, which was both their first bowl game and winning season in a decade. Arizona would become both Pac-10 and Rose Bowl contenders in 2010 before playing poorly late in that season. After Arizona continued to struggle in 2011, Stoops was fired as coach due to the inability to win.

Former West Virginia and Michigan head coach Rich Rodriguez was hired to lead the Wildcats in 2012. Using Rodriguez’s spread offense attack, the Wildcats would earn bowl victories in his first two seasons. In 2014, the Wildcats continued to excel on offense and won the Pac-12 South Division. However, they would lose big to Oregon in the conference championship game that prevented Arizona from earning a possible trip to the inaugural College Football Playoff. They instead ended up appearing in the Fiesta Bowl, losing to Boise State. The Wildcats finished the 2014 season with a record of 10–4 (7–2 Pac-12), achieving only the third 10-win season in program history. Arizona was unable to duplicate the success from 2014 in the 2015–17 seasons, and Rodriguez was dismissed for issues occurring off the field at the conclusion of the 2017 season.

Kevin Sumlin, the ex-Houston and Texas A&M coach, replaced Rodriguez in 2018. However, he was unable to meet expectations and was fired after the 2020 season. Jedd Fisch was hired as the next coach for 2021. He would go into rebuilding mode and in 2023, he led Arizona to their fourth ten-win season and defeated Oklahoma in the Alamo Bowl. After the season concluded, Fisch was hired by Washington to take over as head coach, which forced Arizona to find his successor.

San Jose State coach Brent Brennan was hired as the new Wildcat head coach in 2024. Brennan was a former Arizona assistant under Tomey in 2000. The Wildcats joined the Big 12 at the start of the 2024 season.

=== Men's golf ===
The university's golf teams have also been notably successful. The men's team won a national championship in 1992. Jim Furyk, the 2003 U.S. Open champion attended the University of Arizona prior to turning professional in 1992. The men's team has won three Pac-12 Conference championships (1987, 1991, 2004). Starting in 2023, the Arizona Men will use Tucson Country Club as their home course.

=== Women's golf ===
The women's team is one of the most successful in all of collegiate golf. They have won three national championships in 1996, 2000, and 2018. Annika Sörenstam won an individual national title in 1991, and Lorena Ochoa was NCAA Women's Player of the Year in 2001 and 2002 before leaving UA early to turn pro. Erica Blasberg was the country's number 1 ranked college player as a freshman, compiling six victories before leaving in her sophomore year to turn pro, was an All-American golfer in 2003 and 2004, 2003 NCAA Freshman of the Year, 2003 Pac-10 Player of the Year and Freshman of the Year, and won the 2003 Golfstat Cup, awarded for having the NCAA women's lowest stroke average (72.36).

=== Softball ===
The Arizona softball program has arguably been the best college softball program over the last 20 years. The softball team has won eight NCAA Women's College World Series titles, in 1991, 1993, 1994, 1996, 1997, 2001, 2006 and 2007 under head coach Mike Candrea (NCAA Softball Championship). The team has appeared in the NCAA National Championship in 1991, 1992, 1993, 1994, 1995, 1996, 1997, 1998, 2001, 2002, 2006, 2007 and 2010, a feat second only to UCLA. Mike Candrea also led the 2004 U.S. Olympic softball team to a gold medal in Athens, Greece & 2008 led the team to a silver medal in Beijing, China. Following the 2021 season, Candrea announced his retirement after the 35th season as head coach. He retired as the 2nd most winningest coach in NCAA Softball history with an overall record of 1,859−505−2 and his 8 National Titles were the most & current in NCAA softball history at the time of his retirement. Former National Champion & NCAA All-American Caitlin Lowe was hired as only the 6th coach in team history.

Arizona Wildcats softball
National; Champions 1991	National; Champions 1993	National; Champions 1994	National; Champions 1996	National; Champions 1997	National; Champions 2001	National; Champions 2006	National; Champions 2007

Retired softball jerseys
Jenny; Dalton 16	Nancy; Evans 13	Jennie; Finch 27	Susie; Parra 1	Julie; Reitan 10

=== Swimming ===
The women's and men's swimming & diving team won their first national championships in 2008.

In 2014–2015, women's team member Margo Geer was named the Pac-12 Conference Woman of the Year for the 2014–15 academic year.

=== Synchronized swimming ===
The synchronized swimming team won three championships in 1980, 1981, and 1984, in the Association of Intercollegiate Athletics for Women.

=== Triathlon ===
The women's triathlon team debuted in 2023 and captured a national championship in 2024, 2025 and 2026, in USA Triathlon. The official NCAA Women's Triathlon championship is expected to be held by 2027.

== Notable non-varsity teams ==
=== Men's ice hockey ===
The men's ice hockey team was established in 1979 by head coach and general manager Leo Golembiewski as a Division-1 non-varsity hockey team, the team was originally known as the Arizona IceCats. The team was one of the founding programs of the American Collegiate Hockey Association (ACHA) in 1991; and competes as an independent program at the ACHA Division I level.

The team has played at the 7,000-seat Tucson Convention Center, affectionately known as "The Madhouse on Main Street," since the 1980–81 season and are consistently one of the university's top draws with an average attendance of 3,000 fans per game.

Coach Golembiewski retired after 32 seasons as coach and general manager of the team at the conclusion of the 2010–2011 season. Golembiewski compiled a record of 634–217–23, in addition the IceCats won a National Tournament in 1985 and appeared in the National Tournament twenty-one straight seasons prior to 2004, including in eight Final Fours ('84, '86, '87, '88, '91, '93, '94, '97).

The program was reorganized in 2011 under new head coach Sean Hogan. The team changed its name to the university's official 'Wildcats' name and changed the managerial structure in the whole organization. The new Wildcat hockey team is organized under the auspices of the Campus Recreation Department and began receiving increased financial backing from the university, which they have never had in their history under former head coach and general manager Leo Golembiewski.

For the majority of the program's existence, the ice hockey team has competed independent of a conference. The IceCats were originally part of the Intercollegiate Pacific Conference, and later Pacific Hockey Conference, from 1980 until the formation of the ACHA in 1991. Beginning in the 2013–14 season, the team will join the newly formed Western Collegiate Hockey League (WCHL). The new conference will be made of six member teams, including rival Arizona State.

The Wildcats won the 2018–2019 WCHL Championship.

=== Rugby ===
Founded in 1969, the University of Arizona rugby program plays in the PAC Rugby Conference against its conference rivals such as Arizona State and Utah. The Wildcats were led by head coach Dave Sitton from 1979 to 2013, who served as a board member of USA Rugby, and also worked as a rugby broadcaster for ESPN and Fox.

The Wildcats have become one of the most successful college rugby programs in the country. The Wildcats reached the quarterfinals of the 2010 national collegiate rugby championships. The Wildcats reached the playoffs in 2013, but lost in an upset to Long Beach. The Wildcats reached the D1-AA national playoffs in 2014, where they defeated Long Beach State, Stanford, and Bowling Green, but ultimately lost to Central Florida in the final.

The Wildcats have a successful rugby sevens program. Arizona has regularly reached the quarterfinals of the Collegiate Rugby Championship (CRC), the highest profile college rugby competition in the U.S., and the Wildcats finished second at the 2012 CRC. The CRC is played every June in Philadelphia and is broadcast live on NBC. Arizona's best known rugby players include Trevor Brady, who holds the record for the longest successful kick and most points in school history, Peter Tiberio and Brett Thompson, who play for the U.S. national rugby team.

=== Competition cheerleading ===
Developed in 2014 and founded in 2015, the CO-ED competition cheerleading team was created to give individuals who participated in 4 person stunt groups and competitions a chance to represent the school. The team competes at national levels at the NCA national college competition in Daytona Florida, the USA national college competition in Anaheim California, and more. In 2020, the team placed 2nd in the Virtual Daytona competition and won 1st in the virtual national college classic competition. They have also won the club sport of the year award for the UofA two years in a row, as well as their coach Nicole Dudas receiving the club sports coach of the year award in 2021. The group does many fundraising activities and community service as well.

The team is separate from the sideline team seen at football games, as they focus more on competing at a national level. In a very short amount of time, the organization has grown from being a tier 3 club sport, to a tier one team, an NCA affiliated cheer team, and a national placing team in competitions.

== Championships ==
=== NCAA team championships ===
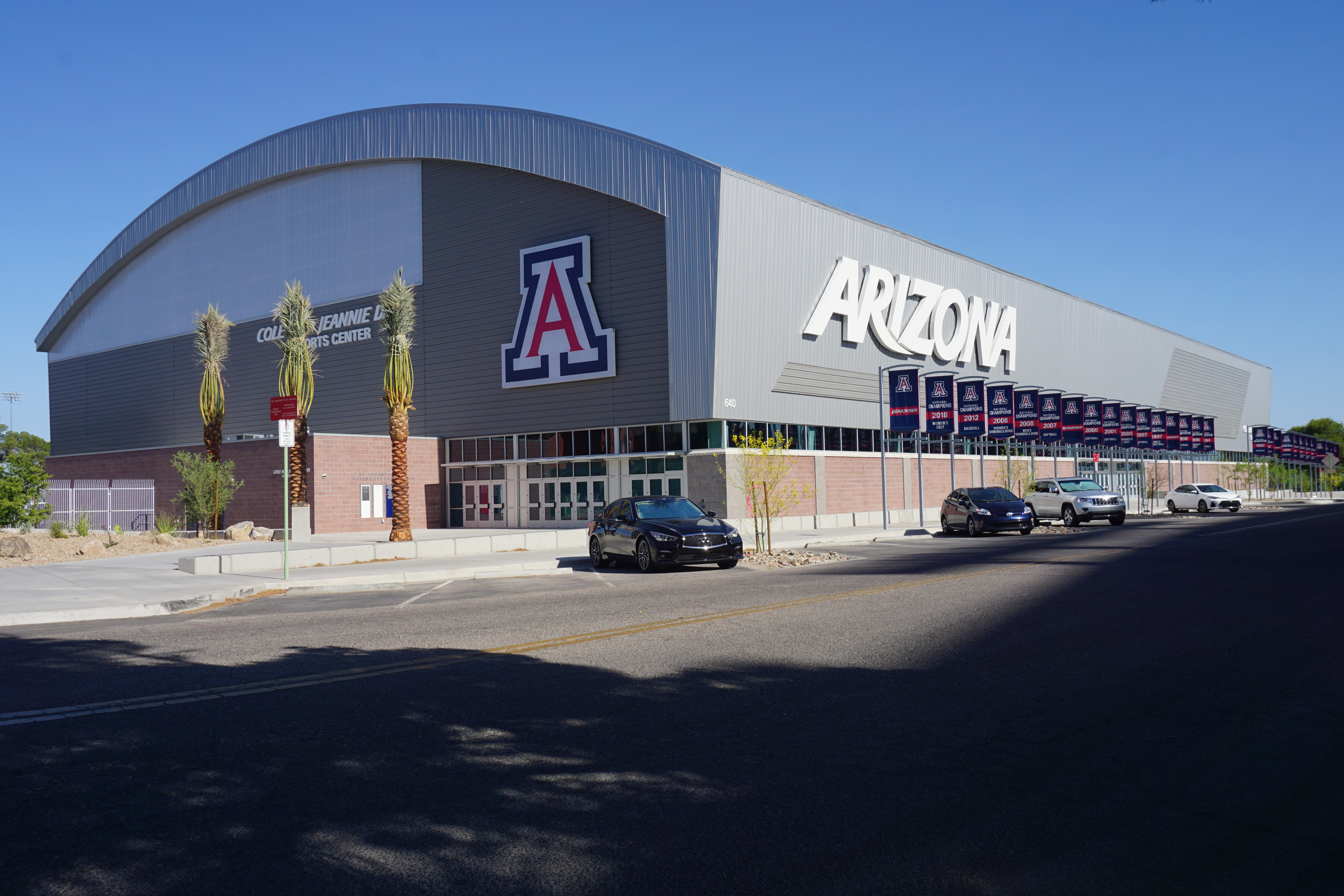
National championship banners displayed at the Cole and Jeannie Davis Sports Center

Arizona has won 19 NCAA team national championships.

- Men's (7)
  - Baseball (4): 1976, 1980, 1986, 2012
  - Basketball (1): 1997
  - Golf (1): 1992
  - Swimming (1): 2008
- Women's (12)
  - Golf (3): 1996, 2000, 2018
  - Softball (8): 1991, 1993, 1994, 1996, 1997, 2001, 2006, 2007
  - Swimming (1): 2008
- see also:
  - Big 12 Conference NCAA championships
  - Pac-12 Conference NCAA championships
  - List of NCAA schools with the most NCAA Division I championships

Results

Year	Sport	Opponent	Result
1976	Baseball	Eastern Michigan	7–1
1980	Baseball	Hawaii	5–3
1986	Baseball	Florida State	10–2
1991	Softball	UCLA	5–1
1992	Men's golf	Arizona State	1,129–1,136
1993	Softball	UCLA	1–0
1994	Softball	Cal State Northridge	4–0
1996	Women's golf	San José State	1,240–1,240^{†}
1996	Softball	Washington	6–4
1997	Men's basketball	Kentucky	84–79^{OT}
1997	Softball	UCLA	10–2
2000	Women's golf	Stanford	1,175–1,196
2001	Softball	UCLA	1–0
2006	Softball	Northwestern	2–0
2007	Softball	Tennessee	2–1
2008	Women's swimming & diving	Auburn	484–348
2008	Men's swimming & diving	Texas	500.5–406
2012	Baseball	South Carolina	2–0
2018	Women's golf	Alabama	3–2

† Won sudden-death playoff

=== Appearances ===
The Arizona Wildcats competed in the NCAA tournament across 22 active sports (9 men's and 13 women's) 553 times at the Division I FBS level.

- Baseball (44): 1950, 1951, 1952, 1953, 1954, 1955, 1956, 1957, 1958, 1959, 1960, 1961, 1962, 1963, 1966, 1970, 1974, 1975, 1976, 1978, 1979, 1980, 1985, 1986, 1987, 1989, 1992, 1993, 1999, 2003, 2004, 2005, 2007, 2008, 2010, 2011, 2012, 2016, 2017, 2021, 2022, 2023, 2024, 2025
- Men's Basketball (40):1951, 1976, 1977, 1985, 1986, 1987, 1988, 1989, 1990, 1991, 1992, 1993, 1994, 1995, 1996, 1997, 1998, 1999, 2000, 2001, 2002, 2003, 2004, 2005, 2006, 2007, 2008, 2009, 2011, 2013, 2014, 2015, 2016, 2017, 2018, 2022, 2023, 2024, 2025, 2026
- Women's Basketball (11): 1997, 1998, 1999, 2000, 2003, 2004, 2005, 2021, 2022, 2023, 2024
- Beach Volleyball (1): 2016
- Men's Cross Country (23): 1972, 1976, 1977, 1978, 1980, 1981, 1982, 1983, 1984, 1985, 1986, 1987, 1990, 1991, 1992, 1994, 1998, 1999, 2000, 2001, 2003, 2005, 2006
- Women's Cross Country (16): 1981, 1991, 1992, 1993, 1994, 1995, 1996, 1998, 1999, 2000, 2001, 2009, 2010, 2011, 2012, 2013
- Football (23): 1921, 1948, 1968, 1979, 1985, 1986, 1989, 1990, 1992, 1993, 1994, 1997, 1998, 2008, 2009, 2010, 2012, 2013, 2014, 2015, 2017, 2023, 2025
- Men's Golf (37): 1941, 1960, 1961, 1963, 1981, 1980, 1982, 1983, 1984, 1987, 1988, 1989, 1990, 1991, 1992, 1993, 1994, 1995, 1996, 1997, 1998, 1999, 2000, 2001, 2002, 2003, 2004, 2005, 2006, 2007, 2009, 2011, 2022, 2023, 2024, 2025, 2026
- Women's Golf (37): 1982, 1983, 1987, 1988, 1989, 1990, 1991, 1992, 1993, 1995, 1996, 1997, 1998, 1999, 2000, 2001, 2002, 2003, 2004, 2006, 2007, 2008, 2009, 2010, 2011, 2013, 2014, 2015, 2016, 2018, 2019, 2021, 2022, 2023, 2024, 2025, 2026
- Women's Gymnastics (12): 1984, 1987, 1988, 1989, 1990, 1991, 1992, 1993, 1996, 2002, 2025, 2026
- Women's Soccer (7): 2004, 2005, 2014, 2015, 2017, 2018, 2019
- Softball (38): 1987, 1988, 1989, 1990, 1991, 1992, 1993, 1994, 1995, 1996, 1997, 1998, 1999, 2000, 2001, 2002, 2003, 2004, 2005, 2006, 2007, 2008, 2009, 2010, 2011, 2012, 2013, 2014, 2015, 2016, 2017, 2018, 2019, 2021, 2022, 2024, 2025, 2026
- Men's Swimming & Diving (48): 1976, 1977, 1978, 1979, 1980, 1981, 1982, 1983, 1984, 1985, 1986, 1987, 1989, 1990, 1991, 1992, 1993, 1994, 1995, 1996, 1997, 1999, 2000, 2001, 2002, 2003, 2004, 2005, 2006, 2007, 2008, 2009, 210, 2011, 2012, 2013, 2014, 2015, 2016, 2017, 2018, 2019, 2021, 2022, 2023, 2024, 2025, 2026
- Women's Swimming & Diving (43): 1982, 1983, 1984, 1985, 1986, 1987, 1988, 1989, 1990, 1991, 1992, 1993, 1994, 1995, 1996, 1997, 1998, 1999, 2000, 2001, 2002, 2003, 2004, 2005, 2006, 2007, 2008, 2009, 2010, 2011, 2012, 2013, 2014, 2015, 2016, 2017, 2018, 2019, 2021, 2022, 2023, 2025, 2026
- Men's Tennis (15): 1996, 1998, 2001, 2003, 2004, 2006, 2009, 2010, 2019, 2021, 2022, 2023, 2024, 2025, 2026
- Women's Tennis (26): 1982, 1985, 1988, 1989, 1990, 1991, 1992, 1993, 1994, 1995, 1996, 1997, 1998, 1999, 2000, 2002, 2003, 2004, 2006, 2007, 2011, 2012, 2014, 2024, 2025, 2026
- Men's Track & Field (64): 1932, 1933, 1939, 1954, 1955, 1958, 1959, 1960, 1961, 1962, 1964, 1965, 1966, 1967, 1969, 1971, 1972, 1973, 1974, 1975, 1976, 1977, 1978, 1979, 1980, 1981, 1982, 1983, 1984, 1985, 1988, 1989, 1990, 1991, 1992, 1993, 1994, 1995, 1996, 1997, 1998, 1999, 2000, 2002, 2003, 2004, 2005, 2006, 2007, 2008, 2009, 2010, 2011, 2012, 2013, 2014, 2015, 2016, 2017, 2018, 2019, 2021, 2023, 2026
- Women's Track & Field (35): 1982, 1983, 1984, 1985, 1986, 1987, 1988, 1989, 1990, 1991, 1992, 1993, 1994, 1996–2000, 2001, 2003, 2004, 2005, 2006, 2007, 2008, 2010, 2012, 2013, 2014, 2015, 2016, 2017, 2018, 2019, 2021, 2022, 2023, 2026
- Women's Triathlon (3): 2023, 2024, 2025 (NCAA Emerging Sport for Women)
- Women's Volleyball (30): 1981, 1982, 1983, 1984, 1985, 1986, 1987, 1988, 1989, 1993, 1994, 1996, 1997, 1998, 1999–2000, 2001, 2002, 2003, 2004, 2005, 2009, 2010, 2011, 2013, 2014, 2015, 2016, 2018, 2025

=== NCAA individual championships ===
Arizona has won 177 NCAA individual national championships.

NCAA individual championships
Year	Athlete(s)	Sport	Event	Source
1964	Gayle Hopkins	Men's outdoor track and field	Long jump	
1965	John Tushaus	Men's outdoor track and field	Javelin	
1968	Pat Arnold	Men's gymnastics	Rings	
1970	Doug Boger	Men's gymnastics	Vault	
1981	Doug Towne	Men's swimming	500 freestyle	
1982	Vance Johnson	Men's outdoor track and field	Long jump	
1983	Meg Ritchie	Women's indoor track and field	Shot put	
1983	George DiCarlo	Men's swimming	500 freestyle	
1984	George DiCarlo	Men's swimming	500 freestyle	
1984	Ruth Waithera	Women's outdoor track and field	400-meter dash	
1985	Katrina Johnson	Women's outdoor track and field	High jump	
1986	Katrina Johnson	Women's indoor track and field	High jump	
1986	Aaron Ramirez	Men's cross country		
1988	Matt Guisto	Men's outdoor track and field	5,000-meter run	
1989	Carla Garrett	Women's indoor track and field	Shot put	
1989	Mariusz Podkoschielny	Men's swimming	1,650 freestyle	
1989	Carla Garrett	Women's outdoor track and field	Discus	
1989	Carla Garrett	Women's outdoor track and field	Shot put	
1989	Mark Davis	Men's outdoor track and field	5,000-meter run	
1989	Derek Huff	Men's outdoor track and field	Decathlon	
1990	Susan Slaughter	Women's golf		
1991	Crissy Ahmann	Women's swimming	100 butterfly	
1991	Anna Basaldua	Women's gymnastics	Vault	
1991	Annika Sorenstam	Women's golf		
1991	Tanya Hughes	Women's indoor track and field	High jump	
1991	Tanya Hughes	Women's outdoor track and field	High jump	
1992	Crissy Ahmann	Women's swimming	100 butterfly	
1992	Mark Davis	Men's outdoor track and field	Steeplechase	
1992	Tanya Hughes	Women's outdoor track and field	High jump	
1993	J.C. Broughton	Women's indoor track and field	High jump	
1993	Seth Pepper	Men's swimming	100 butterfly	
1993	Todd Newman; Robert Abernethy; Seth Pepper; Mike McQuitty	Men's swimming	200 medley relay	
1993	Tanya Hughes	Women's outdoor track and field	High jump	
1993	Alix Creek; Michelle Oldham	Women's tennis	Doubles	
1994	Brenda Sleeuwenhoek	Women's indoor track & field	5,000-meter run	
1994	Martin Keino	Men's cross country		
1994	Chad Carvin	Men's swimming	500 freestyle	
1994	Chad Carvin	Men's swimming	1,650 freestyle	
1995	Ashley Tappin	Women's swimming	50 freestyle	
1995	Ashley Tappin	Women's swimming	200 freestyle	
1995	Martin Keino	Men's outdoor track & field	5,000-meter run	
1996	Amy Skieresz	Women's cross country		
1996	Martin Pepper	Men's swimming	100 butterfly	
1996	Shannon Hosack; Liesl Kolbisen; Casey Legler; Ashley Tappin	Women's swimming	200 freestyle relay	
1996	Heidi Hornbeek	Women's gymnastics	Floor exercise	
1996	Marisa Baena	Women's golf		
1997	Amy Skieresz	Women's indoor track and field	5,000-meter run	
1997	Trina Jackson	Women's swimming	1,650 freestyle	
1997	Shannon Hosack; Liesl Kolbisen; Denali Knapp; Ashley Tappin	Women's swimming	200 freestyle relay	
1997	Ryk Neethling	Men's swimming	1,650 freestyle	
1997	Amy Skieresz	Women's outdoor track & field	10,000-meter run	
1997	Amy Skieresz	Women's outdoor track & field	5,000-meter run	
1998	Trina Jackson	Women's swimming	1,650 freestyle	
1998	Ryk Neethling	Men's swimming	200 freestyle	
1998	Ryk Neethling	Men's swimming	500 freestyle	
1998	Ryk Neethling	Men's swimming	1,650 freestyle	
1998	Amy Skieresz	Women's indoor track and field	5,000-meter run	
1998	Klaus Ambrosch	Men's outdoor track and field	Decathlon	
1998	Esko Mikkola	Men's outdoor track and field	Javelin	
1998	Amy Skieresz	Women's outdoor track and field	10,000-meter run	
1998	Amy Skieresz	Women's outdoor track and field	5,000-meter run	
1998	Shannon Hosack; Liesl Kolbisen; Denali Knapp; Lindsey Farella	Women's swimming	200 freestyle relay	
1998	Shannon Hosack; Liesl Kolbisen; Lindsey Farella; Denali Knapp	Women's swimming	400 freestyle relay	
1998	Trina Jackson; Laurie Kline; Maureen Phillips; Lindsey Farella	Women's swimming	800 freestyle relay	
1999	Ryk Neethling	Men's swimming	200 freestyle	
1999	Ryk Neethling	Men's swimming	500 freestyle	
1999	Ryk Neethling	Men's swimming	1,650 freestyle	
1999	Lindsey Farella; Denali Knapp; Emily Mastin; Sarah Tolar	Women's swimming	400 freestyle relay	
2000	Beth Botsford	Women's swimming	200 backstroke	
2000	Trina Jackson; Sarah Tolar; Jenny Vanker; Emily Mastin	Women's swimming	800 freestyle relay	
2000	Ryk Neethling	Men's swimming	200 freestyle	
2000	Ryk Neethling	Men's swimming	500 freestyle	
2000	Jenna Daniels	Women's golf		
2000	Esko Mikkola	Men's outdoor track and field	Javelin	
2000	Patrick Nduwimana	Men's outdoor track and field	800-meter dash	
2001	Patrick Nduwimana	Men's indoor track and field	800-meter dash	
2001	Amanda Beard	Women's swimming	200 breaststroke	
2001	Sarah Tolar	Women's swimming	200 freestyle	
2001	Andrea Dutoit	Women's outdoor track and field	Pole vault	
2001	Brianna Glenn	Women's outdoor track and field	Long jump	
2001	Brianna Glenn	Women's outdoor track and field	200-meter dash	
2001	Tara Chaplin	Women's cross country		
2002	Amy Linnen	Women's indoor track and field	Pole vault	
2002	Roland Schoeman	Men's swimming	50 freestyle	
2002	Sarah Tolar	Women's swimming	200 freestyle	
2002	Emily Mason; Jenny Vanker; Jessica Hayes; Sarah Tolar	Women's swimming	800 freestyle relay	
2003	Simon Burnett	Men's swimming	200 freestyle	
2004	Emily Mason	Women's swimming	400 freestyle	
2004	Robert Cheseret	Men's outdoor track and field	5,000-meters	
2005	Simon Burnett	Men's swimming	200-yard freestyle	
2005	Emily Mason	Women's swimming	500-yard freestyle	
2005	Marshi Smith	Women's swimming	100-yard backstroke	
2005	Robert Cheseret	Men's outdoor track and field	10,000-meters	
2006	Lyndon Ferns	Men's swimming	100-yard butterfly	
2006	Simon Burnett	Men's swimming	200-yard freestyle	
2006	Nick Thoman; Ivan Barnes; Albert Subirats; Adam Ritter	Men's swimming	400 Medley Relay	
2006	Albert Subirats; Dave Rollins; Lyndon Ferns; Simon Burnett	Men's swimming	200 medley relay	
2006	Simon Burnett; Lyndon Ferns; Tyler DeBerry; Adam Ritter	Men's swimming	800 freestyle relay	
2006	Simon Burnett; Lyndon Ferns; Albert Subirats; Adam Ritter	Men's swimming	400 freestyle relay	
2006	Whitney Myers	Women's swimming	200 individual medley	
2006	Whitney Myers	Women's swimming	400 individual medley	
2006	Courtney Cashion; Jenna Gresdal; Anna Turner; Lindsey Kelly	Women's swimming	200 freestyle relay	
2006	Courtney Cashion; Jenna Gresdal; Whitney Myers; Lacey Nymeyer	Women's swimming	400 freestyle relay	
2006	Jenna Gresdal; Erin Sieper; Whitney Myers; Lacey Nymeyer	Women's swimming	400 medley relay	
2006	Jake Arnold	Men's outdoor track and field	Decathlon	
2007	Nicolas Nilo; Jean Basson; Darian Townsend; Adam Ritter	Men's swimming	200 individual medley	
2007	Adam Ritter	Men's swimming	200 individual medley	
2007	Albert Subirats	Men's swimming	100 butterfly	
2007	Albert Subirats	Men's swimming	100 backstroke	
2007	Darian Townsend	Men's swimming	200 freestyle	
2007	Hailey DeGolia; Annie Chandler; Lara Jackson; Lindsey Kelly	Women's swimming	200 medley relay	
2007	Lara Jackson; Lacey Nymeyer; Anna Turner; Lindsey Kelly	Women's swimming	200 freestyle relay	
2007	Jake Arnold	Men's outdoor track and field	Decathlon	
2008	Albert Subirats	Men's swimming	100 butterfly	
2008	Darian Townsend	Men's swimming	200 individual medley	
2008	Albert Subirats; Darian Townsend; Nicolas Nilo; Joel Greenshields	Men's swimming	400 freestyle relay	
2008	Jean Basson; Darian Townsend; Joel Greenshields; Nicolas Nilo	Men's swimming	800 freestyle relay	
2008	Albert Subirats; Ivan Barnes; Darian Townsend; Joel Greenshields	Men's swimming	400 medley relay	
2008	Lara Jackson	Women's swimming	50 freestyle	
2008	Lacey Nymeyer	Women's swimming	100 freestyle	
2008	Lara Jackson; Lacey Nymeyer; Anna Turner; Taylor Baughman	Women's swimming	200 freestyle relay	
2008	Lacey Nymeyer; Anna Turner; Lara Jackson; Taylor Baughman	Women's swimming	400 freestyle relay	
2008	Justine Schluntz; Lacey Nymeyer; Leone Vorster; Taylor Baughman	Women's swimming	800 freestyle relay	
2008	Hailey DeGolia; Annie Chandler; Lara Jackson; Anna Turner	Women's swimming	200 medley relay	
2008	Hailey DeGolia; Annie Chandler; Ana Agy; Lacey Nymeyer	Women's swimming	400 medley relay	
2008	Liz Patterson	Women's outdoor track and field	High jump	
2009	Jean Basson	Men's swimming	500 freestyle	
2009	Lara Jackson	Women's swimming	50 freestyle	
2009	Lara Jackson; Lindsey Kelly; Justine Schluntz; Taylor Baughman	Women's swimming	200 freestyle relay	
2009	Ana Agy; Annie Chandler; Lara Jackson; Justine Schluntz	Women's swimming	400 medley relay	
2010	Liz Patterson	Women's indoor track and field	High jump	
2010	Annie Chandler	Women's swimming	100 breaststroke	
2010	Ana Agy; Ann Chandler; Erin Campbell; Justine Schluntz	Women's swimming	200 medley relay	
2010	Ana Agy; Ann Chandler; Whitney Lopus; Justine Schluntz	Women's swimming	400 medley relay	
2010	Cory Chitwood	Men's swimming	200 backstroke	
2010	Clark Burckle	Men's swimming	200 breaststroke	
2011	Julie Labonte	Women's indoor track and field	Shot put	
2011	Brigetta Barrett	Women's indoor track and field	High jump	
2011	Cory Chitwood	Men's swimming	200 backstroke	
2011	Julie Labonte	Women's outdoor track and field	Shot put	
2011	Brigetta Barrett	Women's outdoor track and field	High jump	
2011	Lawi Lalang	Men's cross country		
2012	Brigetta Barrett	Women's indoor track and field	High jump	
2012	Lawi Lalang	Men's indoor track and field	3,000-meter run	
2012	Lawi Lalang	Men's indoor track and field	5,000-meter run	
2012	Nick Ross	Men's indoor track and field	High jump	
2012	Cory Chitwood	Men's swimming	200 backstroke	
2012	Kevin Cordes	Men's swimming	100 breaststroke	
2012	Austen Thompson	Men's swimming	400 individual medley	
2012	Mitchell Friedemann; Kevin Cordes; Giles Smith; Adam Small	Men's swimming	200 medley relay	
2012	Ben Grado	Men's diving	Platform	
2012	Brigetta Barrett	Women's outdoor track and field	High jump	
2013	Lawi Lalang	Men's indoor track and field	Mile run	
2013	Lawi Lalang	Men's indoor track and field	3,000-meter run	
2013	Brigetta Barrett	Women's indoor track and field	High jump	
2013	Kevin Cordes	Men's swimming	100 breaststroke	
2013	Kevin Cordes	Men's swimming	200 breaststroke	
2013	Mitchell Friedemann; Kevin Cordes; Giles Smith; Nimrod Shapira Bar-Or	Men's swimming	400 medley relay	
2013	Margo Geer	Women's swimming	50 freestyle	
2013	Margo Geer	Women's swimming	100 freestyle	
2013	Samantha Pickens	Women's diving	1-meter springboard	
2013	Lawi Lalang	Men's outdoor track and field	5,000-meter run	
2013	Lawi Lalang	Men's outdoor track and field	10,000-meter run	
2013	Brigetta Barrett	Women's outdoor track and field	High jump	
2014	Kevin Cordes	Men's swimming	100 breaststroke	
2014	Kevin Cordes	Men's swimming	200 breaststroke	
2014	Brad Tandy	Men's swimming	50 freestyle	
2014	Margo Geer	Women's swimming	100 freestyle	
2014	Lawi Lalang	Men's outdoor track and field	5,000-meter run	
2015	Samantha Pickens	Women's diving	1-meter springboard	
2015	Kevin Cordes	Men's swimming	100 breaststroke	
2017	Sage Watson	Women's outdoor track and field	400-meter hurdles	
2023	Jordan Geist	Men's indoor track and field	Shot put	
2023	Delaney Schnell	Women's diving	Platform	
2023	Jordan Geist	Men's outdoor track and field	Shot put	

=== Other national championships ===
Arizona has won 3 USSS/AIAW national championships.

- Women (3)
  - Synchronized Swimming (3): 1980^{‡}, 1981(both AIAW); 1984 (USSS)

‡ Co-National Champion

In addition, Arizona has won 2 USA Triathlon national championships.

- Women (2)
  - Triathlon (2): 2024, 2025

== Notable athletic venues ==
- McKale Center, opened in 1973, is currently used by men's and women's basketball, women's gymnastics, and women's volleyball. The official capacity has changed often. The largest crowd to see a game in McKale was 15,176 in 1976 for a game against the University of New Mexico, a main rival during that period. In 2000, the floor in McKale was dubbed Lute Olson Court, for the basketball program's winningest coach. During a memorial service in 2001 for Lute's wife, Bobbi, who died earlier that year after a battle with ovarian cancer, the floor was renamed Lute and Bobbi Olson Court. In addition to the playing surface, McKale Center is host to the offices of the UA athletic department. McKale Center is named after J.F. Pop McKale, who was athletic director and coach from 1914 through 1957.
- Casino Del Sol Stadium, built in 1928, seats over 56,000 patrons. It's the home for the University of Arizona Wildcats football team, and has also been used for university graduations. The bermuda grass turf taken from the local Tucson National Golf Club was removed following the 2012 season and replaced with artificial turf. Arizona football's home record is 258–139–12. The largest crowd ever in Arizona Stadium was 59,920 in 1996 for a game against Arizona State University.
- Jerry Kindall Field at Frank Sancet Stadium hosted baseball games until the 2011 season; games are now played at Hi Corbett Field.
- Rita Hillenbrand Memorial Stadium hosts softball games.
- Lanelle Robson Tennis Center hosts men's and women's tennis matches.
- The Tucson Convention Center ("The Madhouse on Main St.") hosts hockey games.

== Wildcats in the Olympics ==
In addition to the successful athletic program, Arizona has produced 129 Olympians making 193 appearances between 1952 through 2026.

Notable Wildcat Olympians include Delaney Schnell (women's diving, silver), Amy Van Dyken (women's swimming, gold), Josh Green (men's basketball, bronze), Jennie Finch (softball, gold and silver), Andre Iguodala (men's basketball, gold), Amanda Beard (women's swimming, multiple medals), and Richard Jefferson (men's basketball, bronze).

Gold	Silver	Bronze	Total Olympic Medals
36	24	14	74

== Traditions ==
- At the beginning of each school year, freshmen repaint the "A" on "A" Mountain, a Tucson and Wildcat landmark just west of campus.
- One of the two bells rescued from the USS Arizona after the attack on Pearl Harbor has a permanent home in the clock tower of the Student Union Memorial Center on campus. The bell first arrived on campus in July 1946. The bell is rung seven times on the third Wednesday of every month at 12:07 p.m. to honor the achievements of the UA, as well as after football victories over all schools located outside of Arizona.
- The University of Arizona marching band, named The Pride of Arizona, played at the halftime of the first Super Bowl. The band plays at most of the university's athletic events.

=== History of Bear Down, Arizona! ===
In 1952, Jack K. Lee, an applicant for the UA's band directorship, departed Tucson by air following an interview with UA administration. From his airplane window, Lee observed the huge letters on the roof of the UA gymnasium reading "BEAR DOWN". Inspired, Lee scribbled down what was at first a poem, but later turned into a song. By the time his plane landed, he had virtually finished it. A few weeks later Lee was named the UA band director, and in September 1952, the UA band performed "Bear Down, Arizona!" in public for the first time. Soon thereafter, "Bear Down, Arizona!" became accepted as UA's fight song despite the fact that the Chicago Bears fight song, "Bear Down, Chicago Bears", was introduced in 1941.

=== History behind the motto Bear Down ===
The battle cry was created by a popular student athlete, John "Button" Salmon, who was the student body president, as well as the starting quarterback for the Wildcat football team and the catcher for the Wildcat baseball team.

The day before the first game of the 1926 football season, Salmon and three friends were involved in an automobile accident and their vehicle flipped over a ravine. Although Salmon's friends were not injured, Salmon incurred a severe spinal cord injury.

In the aftermath of the accident, football coach Pop McKale visited him in the hospital every day. During McKale's last visit, Salmon's last message to his teammates was, "Tell them...tell the team to bear down." John Salmon died on October 18, 1926.

The following year, the University of Arizona student body approved that "Bear Down" would be the new slogan for all Wildcat athletic teams. In 1939, the Arizona state legislature issued a decree that "Bear Down" would be the exclusive property of the University of Arizona.

== Arizona Sports Ring of Honor ==
A heritage committee, organized by current and former longtime athletics department staff, manages these through reviews and makes recommendations based on all available information, resources, and considerations.

Ring of Honor criteria:

- First Team All-American recognized by one or more major national organizations or media.
- Major national "player of distinction".
- Conference Player of the Year, Freshman of the Year, and Defensive Player of the Year. Pac-10/12 Offensive or Defensive Player of the Year. (for football only)
- Arizona career leader in three or more major positive career categories at the conclusion of their collegiate career, must hold the career record for a minimum of 5 years. (does not include single game record(s), minutes played, etc.)
- 10+ years in the United States professional leagues of the NFL, NBA, WNBA, and MLB and/or been selected as an All-Star/All Pro by the official league.
- Olympic Medalist
- The individual has brought recognition, distinction, and honor to the sports program. The following career statistics are considered: school, conference and/or national achievement, history, and impact.

=== Baseball Legends Plaza Wall of Fame ===
Athlete	Year(s) at Arizona
Hank Leiber	1930
Robert Murray	1947–1950
Don Lee	1954–1956
Carl Thomas	1954–1956
Dick Griesser	1954–1958
Tom Clarkson	1955–1957
Matt Encinas	1957–1959
Alan Hall	1958–1960
C. Shoemaker	1959–1961
Dan Schneider	1961–1962
Eddie Leon	1965–1967
Pat O'Brien	1966–1968
Jerry Stitt	1966–1968
Tim Plodinec	1967–1968
Steve Miklulic	1970–1971
John Glenn	1970–1972
Dennis Haines	1971–1974
Dave Stegman	1973–1976
Ron Hassey	1974–1976
Steve Powers	1974–1976
Les Pearsey	1975–1978
Terry Francona	1978–1980
Craig Leffery	1978–1980
Wes Clements	1979–1980
John Moses	1979–1980
Ed Vosberg	1980–1983
Jack Howell	1983
Bob Ralston	1983–1984
Joe Magrane	1983–1985
Chip Hale	1984–1987
Gil Heredia	1986–1987
Kenny Lofton	1988
JT Snow	1987–1989
Alan Zinter	1987–1989
Trevor Hoffman	1988–1989
Robbie Moen	1990–1993
George Arias	1992–1993
Scott Erickson	1989
Ben Diggins	1999–2000
Shelley Duncan	1999–2001
Trevor Crowe	2003–2005
Keoni DeRenne	1998–2000
Brian Anderson	2001–2003
Nick Hundley	2003–2005
Brad Boyer	2003–2006
Derek Decater	2003–2006
Jason Donald	2004–2006
Eric Berger	2005–2008
Preston Guilmet	2006–2009

=== Men's Basketball Ring of Honor ===
Athlete	Year(s) at Arizona
Bob Elliott	1973–1977
Steve Kerr	1983–1988
Sean Elliott	1985–1989
Jud Buechler	1986–1990
Sean Rooks	1989–1992
Chris Mills	1990–1993
Khalid Reeves	1990–1994
Damon Stoudamire	1991–1995
Miles Simon	1994–1998
Jason Terry	1995–1999
Mike Bibby	1996–1998
Michael Wright	1998–2001
Richard Jefferson	1999–2001
Jason Gardner	1999–2003
Luke Walton	1998–2003
Salim Stoudamire	2002–2005
Gilbert Arenas	1999–2001
Chase Budinger	2006–2009
Jerryd Bayless	2007–2008
Derrick Williams	2009–2011
Andre Iguodala	2002–2004
Nick Johnson	2011–2014
Aaron Gordon	2013–2014
Channing Frye	2001–2005
Stanley Johnson	2014–2015
Deandre Ayton	2017–2018
Albert "Al" Fleming	1972–1976
Ernie McCray	1957–1960
Zeke Nnaji	2019–2020
Josh Green	2019–2020
Bennedict Mathurin	2021–2022
Christian Koloko	2019–2022
Kenny Lofton	1985–1989
T.J. McConnell	2013–2015
Lauri Markkanen	2016–2017
Caleb Love	2023–2025

=== Women's Basketball Ring of Honor ===
Athlete	Year(s) at Arizona
Adia Barnes	1995–1998
Shawtinice Polk	2001–2005
Dee Dee Wheeler	2002–2005
Ifunanya "Ify" Ibekwe	2007–2011
Davellyn Whyte	2009–2013
Aari McDonald	2017–2021
Kirsten Smith	1982–1986

=== Football Ring of Honor ===
Athlete	Year(s) at Arizona
Dave Hibbert	1958
Hank Stanton	1939–1941
Walt Nielsen	1936–1938
Tony Bouie	1991–1994
Allan Durden	1982–1985
Harold McClellan	1920–1922
Eddie Wilson	1959–1961
Ted Bland	1933–1935
Tom Greenfield	1936–1938
Fred W. Enke	1946–1947
Art Luppino	1953–1956
Jackie Wallace	1970–1972
Chris McAlister	1996–1998
Theopolis Bell	1972–1975
Steve McLaughlin	1991–1994
Josh Miller	1990–1992
Chuck Cecil	1984–1987
Mark Arneson	1969–1971
Ricky Hunley	1980–1983
Tedy Bruschi	1992–1995
Darryll Lewis	1987–1990
Joe Tofflemire	1985–1988
Dennis Northcutt	1996–1999
Rob Waldrop	1990–1993
Tom Tunnicliffe	1980–1983
Byron Evans	1983–1986
Glenn Parker	1988–1989
Brant Boyer	1992–1993
Michael Bates	1989–1990
John Fina	1988–1991
Dana Wells	1985–1988
Max Zendejas	1982–1985
Lance Briggs	1999–2002
Antonio Pierce	1999–2000
Mike Dawson	1972–1975
Antoine Cason	2004–2007
Edwin Mulitalo	1997–1998
Nick Folk	2003–2006
Mike Thomas	2005–2008
Nick Foles	2009–2010
Ka'Deem Carey	2011–2013
Bobby Wade	1999–2002
Rob Gronkowski	2007–2009
Scooby Wright	2013–2015
Trung Canidate	1996–1999
Brandon Manumaleuna	1997–2000
Keith Smith	1996–1999
Earl Mitchell	2006–2009
Brooks Reed	2007–2010

=== Gymnastics Ring of Honor ===
Athlete	Year(s) at Arizona
Mary-Kay Brown	1984–1988
Kelly Chaplin	1984–1988
Caroline Wood	1986–1989
Diane Monty	1998–1991
Anna Basaldua	1990–1993
Kristi Gunning	1991–1994
Stacy Fowlkes	1992–1993
Jenna Karadbil	1992–1995
Shane Allbritton	1993–1996
Tenli Poggemeyer	1994–1998
Maureen Kealey	1996–1999
Kristin McDermott	1996–1999
Heidi Hornbeek	1996–2000
Kara Fry	1998–2001
Monica Bisordi	2002–2005
Randi Liljenquist	1999–2003
Katie Johnson	2002–2005
Karin Wurm	2005–2008
Katie Matusik	2009–2012

=== Volleyball Ring of Honor ===
Athlete	Year(s) at Arizona
Melissa McLinden	1982–1985
Caren Kemner	1983–1984
Terry Lauchner	1987–1990
Barb Bell	1993–1996
Dana Burkholder	1998–2001
Jill Talbot	1998–2001
Kim Glass	2002–2005
Penina Snuka	2013–2016
Whitney Dosty	2006–2009
