= Arizona Wildcat Women's cross country =

Arizona Wildcats Women's Cross Country
- University: University of Arizona
- Head coach: Bernard Lagat
- Conference: Pac-12
- Location: Tucson, Arizona
- Nickname: Wildcats
- Colors: Cardinal and navy

Women's NCAA appearances
- 1981, 1991, 1992, 1993, 1994, 1995, 1996, 1998, 1999, 2000, 2001, 2009, 2010, 2011, 2012, 2013, 2024

Women's conference champions
- 2013

Arizona Wildcats Women's Cross Country represents the University of Arizona and competes in the Big 12 Conference. The team is current coached by Andrew Dubs, who is also the head coach of the USA National Track & Field Team.

== Notable athletes ==
Women's individual national championships
Year	Athlete	League
1996	Amy Skieresz	NCAA
2001	Tara Chaplin	NCAA

Women's individual conference champions
Year	Athlete	Conference
1995	Amy Skieresz	Pac-10
1996	Amy Skieresz (2)	Pac-10
1997	Amy Skieresz (3)	Pac-10
1998	Amy Skieresz (4)	Pac-10

Pac-10/12 Athlete of the Year
Year	Athlete
1995	Amy Skieresz
1996	Amy Skieresz (2)
1997	Amy Skieresz (3)
1998	Amy Skieresz (4)
2000	Tara Chaplin

Pac-12 Newcomer/Freshman of the Year
Year	Athlete
2012	Kayla Beattie

Pac-12 Scholar Athlete of the Year
Year	Athlete
2013	Elvin Kibet
2014	Stephanie Bulder

=== NCAA All-American ===
- Joan Hansen: 1979, 1980, 1981
- Joy Hansen: 1979
- Marjorie Kaput: 1980, 1981
- Bridget Smyth: 1988
- Jean Harvey: 1992
- Brenda Sleeuwenhoek: 1993
- Suzanne Castruita: 1994
- Ann Colonna: 1995
- Amy Skieresz: 1995, 1996, 1997, 1998
- Tara Chaplin: 1999, 2001
- Jen Bergman: 2011, 2012
- Elvin Kibet: 2012, 2013
- Nicci Corbin: 2013
- Claire Green: 2017

=== Pac-10/12 All-Conference ===
- Katrin Engelen: 2000(2nd Team)
- Tara Chaplin: 2000(1st Team), 2001(1st Team),
- Beth Hoge: 2000(2nd Team)
- Mattie Callahan: 2009(2nd Team)
- Hannah Moen: 2010(2nd Team)
- Megan Meyer: 2010(2nd Team)
- Elvin Kibet: 2010(1st Team), 2011(2nd Team), 2012(1st Team), 2013(1st Team)
- Jen Bergman: 2010(1st Team), 2011(1st Team), 2012(1st Team)
- Nicci Corbin: 2013(1st Team)
- Kayla Beattie: 2013(1st Team)
- Addi Zerrenner: 2016(2nd Team), 2018(2nd Team)

== Year by year results ==
Women's
Year	Conference Finish	Points	NCAA Finish	Points
Pac-12 Conference
1986	5th	–	–	–
1987	8th	–	–	–
1988	5th	–	–	–
1989	5th	–	–	–
1990	3rd	–	–	–
1991	2nd	–	8th	182
1992	3rd	–	14th	294
1993	2nd	–	12th	311
1994	2nd	–	10th	273
1995	2nd	–	6th	186
1996	3rd	–	6th	214
1997	4th	–	–	–
1998	3rd	–	16th	397
1999	5th	119	27th	608
2000	3rd	79	19th	476
2001	2nd	64	4th	194
2002	9th	242	–	–
2003	6th	179	–	–
2004	6th	180	–	–
2005	9th	208	–	–
2006	7th	206	–	–
2007	6th	188	–	–
2008	7th	199	–	–
2009	6th	130	30th	682
2010	2nd	65	11th	372
2011	5th	104	19th	447
2012	2nd	69	6th	263
2013	1st	69	2nd	197
2014	8th	200	–	–
2015	8th	237	–	–
2016	8th	204	–	–
2017	7th	186	–	–
2018	10th	251	–	–
2019	6th	191	–	–
2020	8th	201	–	–
2021	12th	343	–	–
2022	9th	256	–	–
2023	10th	295	–	–
Big 12 Conference
2024	16th	463	–	–
2025	15th	407	–	–
