= The Pride of Arizona =

University of Arizona marching and pep band

- School: University of Arizona
- Location: Tucson, AZ
- Conference: Big 12
- Founded: 1902
- Director: Chad Shoopman
- Members: ≈ 265
- Fight song: "Bear Down, Arizona", "Fight! Wildcats! Fight!"
- Website: http://www.prideofarizona.org

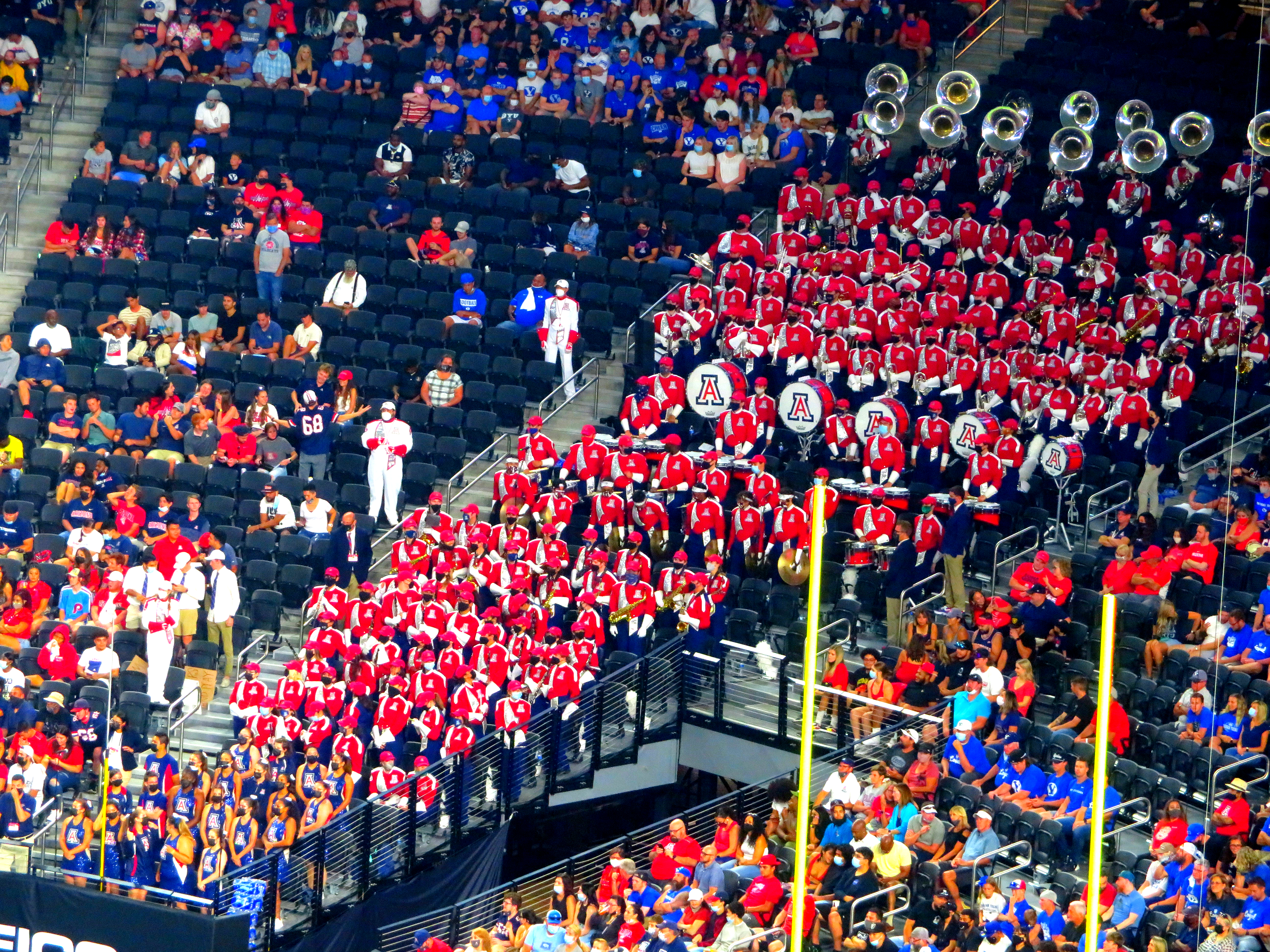
The Pride of Arizona in the stands at the Vegas Kickoff Classic

The Pride of Arizona (PoA) is the marching band and pep band at the University of Arizona. The band was founded in 1902 as the UA ROTC Band and contained 12 members. The band is well-known for their performance at Super Bowl I and the Inaugural Parade of President James Earl "Jimmy" Carter, Jr.

== History ==
- 1885: The University of Arizona is established.
- 1902: The UA ROTC Band is established under the direction of student B-flat clarinetist William K. Seitz. Wearing military uniforms, the band makes its first appearance at a battalion parade on Dec. 9, 1902. The band originally only had 12 members.
- 1904: After only 2 years, the band is dissolved due to lack of interest.
- 1907: The band is created as part of the Music Department.
- 1920: The band is offered for one credit unit, and subsequently grows to the "impressive" size of 40 men. The ROTC band is dissolved with the Arizona Band taking over its functions.
- 1922: The band makes its first appearance at a football game and gets 50 instruments from the Military.
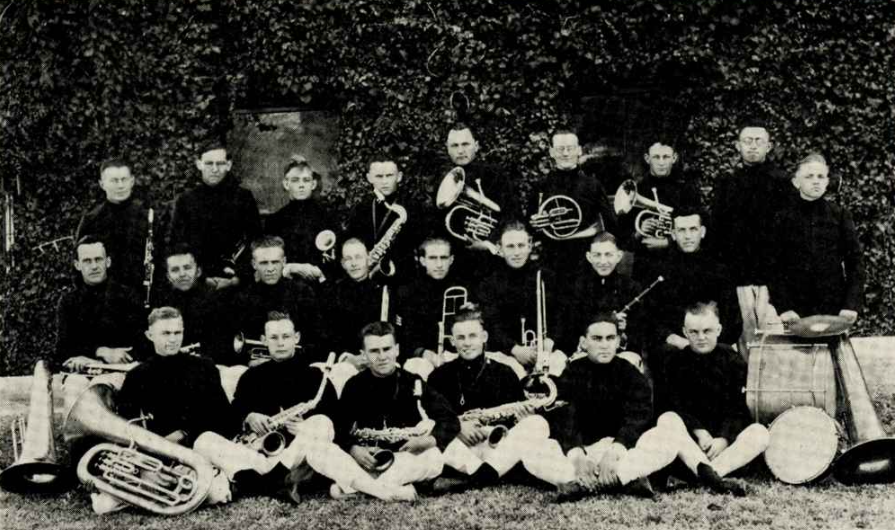
  University of Arizona Band under direction of J. H. McGibbeny, obtained from 1922 Desert, University of Arizona Yearbook.
- 1928: Joseph DeLuca is hired as the director of bands. He was known as "the world’s greatest euphonium soloist," and was a member of Sousa's band. The band is the first band from Arizona to perform on the radio.
- 1936: The band adopts the name "The Best Band in the West" at the Western States and Philippine Islands Music Conference in Pasadena, CA.
- 1945: While rebuilding after World War II, women are allowed to march in the Arizona Band for the first time.
- 1952: Jack Lee becomes director of bands. Lee wrote the fight song "Bear Down, Arizona."
- 1954: The University of Arizona hosts its first annual Band Day. The Arizona Band is the first band in the nation to incorporate moving formations and marching charts, and is considered to be one of the top five bands in the country.
- 1967: On January 15, the band performs at halftime for Super Bowl I at the Los Angeles Coliseum. With 62,000 spectators in attendance, and another 90 million watching on television, this is the single largest crowd the band has ever played for.
- 1977: The band marches in the Inaugural Parade of President James Carter in Washington, D.C.
- 1980: The name "Pride of Arizona" is first used and is adopted as the band's official nickname shortly thereafter.
- 1984: "Bear Down, Arizona" is played to wake up the astronauts on the April Space Shuttle mission.
- 1986: The band travels to Japan to perform in the Tokyo Bowl (Arizona v. Stanford football game).
- 1995: Jay C. Rees becomes director of the Pride of Arizona, adopting the slogan "The World’s First Alternative Music Marching Band."
- 1997: The marching and pep bands release their first studio CD recording, entitled The Pride of Arizona - The University of Arizona Marching and Pep Bands.
- 2001: The pep band releases their second studio CD recording, entitled Wildcats Legacy Lane - The University of Arizona Pep Band.
- 2002: The band celebrates its 100th anniversary and the 50th anniversary of "Bear Down, Arizona". "A Century of Pride" is the university's homecoming theme, and the year is marked with performances throughout the band program.
- 2004: The "Grande Dame" of the Pride of Arizona, twirling coach Shirlee Bertolini, celebrates her 50th year with the Pride of Arizona.
- 2006: On October 28, the band performs (in exhibition) for the Bands of America competition in the Los Angeles Coliseum. That same year, a recording of their Radiohead performance from the Wildcats' home game against the University of Washington makes its way onto the popular video-sharing site YouTube. It later received an award for being the 74th most viewed video in the category of music for the year of 2006.
- 2008: The band releases its third album, entitled Monkey Feet. The album, recorded throughout the course of the 2003, 2004, 2005, and 2006 seasons, was made possible by a generous grant from the Marshall Foundation of Tucson, Arizona, and is dedicated to the memory of former band member Eric Bradley, a horn player who died after the 2006 season from brain cancer. All proceeds from the album go in memory of Eric to the University of Arizona Cancer Center.
- 2009: The band receives the honor of being selected by the College Band Directors National Association as one of the ten best college marching bands in the nation.
- 2013: The band is selected to record the Bay City Rollers' "Saturday Night" for a national commercial spot by Hyundai USA, with the additional goal of creating college football's first ever theme song. The performance was sight-read, rehearsed and recorded in a total of two hours inside Casino Del Sol Stadium on August 22.
- 2015: The band is again selected by the College Band Directors National Association as one of the ten best college marching bands in the nation.
- 2019: The band's performance at the 66th Annual University of Arizona Band Day goes viral after receiving praise by all four members of No Doubt on social media.
- 2024: The band becomes the 34th recipient of the prestigious Sudler Trophy, described by the Los Angeles Times as "the Heisman Trophy of the collegiate band world."

== Instrumentation and auxiliaries ==
The instrumentation of the Pride of Arizona is as follows, in score order:

- Piccolo
- Clarinet
- Alto Saxophone
- Tenor Saxophone
- Baritone Saxophone
- Trumpet
- Mellophone
- Trombone
- Baritone Horn
- Sousaphone

The percussion section (drumline) of the Pride of Arizona is battery only and consists of snares, tenor drums, bass drums, and cymbals.

There are three auxiliary units that perform with the Pride of Arizona: the Pom Line (dance, pom-poms), Twirling Team (batons), and Color Guard (flags, rifles and other equipment).

== Directors of the Pride of Arizona ==
This lists each director's tenure only as director of the marching band, not necessarily with the University of Arizona as a whole.

As the "ROTC University Band"

- 1902-1904: William K. Seitz
- 1906-1908: C. G. Hoover
- 1913: A. E. Clark
- 1916-1917: Clark Leaming
- 1918-1920: 2nd Lt. Alfred E. Truscott
- 1920-1922: J. H. McGibbeny

As the "ROTC University Band and Concert Band"

- 1922-1923: Guy Tufford
- 1923-1925: Ernest G. Dobney
- 1925-1928: Guy Tufford

As one of the "University of Arizona Bands"

- 1928-1935: Joseph O. DeLuca
- 1935-1939: Maurice F. Anderson
- 1939-1946: George C. Wilson
- 1946-1952: Sam Fain
- 1952-1980: Jack Lee
- 1980-1985: James Keene
- 1985-1987: Stephen K. Steele
- 1987-1989: Joseph Hermann
- 1989-1991: Eric Becher
- 1991-1992: Gregg I. Hanson
- 1992-1995: Enrique "Hank" C. Feldman
- 1995-2014: Jay C. Rees
- 2014-2016: Allison Howard (interim)
- 2016–present: Chad Shoopman

== Halftime field shows ==
The Pride of Arizona historically fielded multiple short shows throughout each season, some having a central theme of a particular artist or style, and some made up of selections of unrelated individual songs. In 1995, director Jay Rees introduced a different format consisting of a singular long-duration primary show, performed in smaller parts throughout the season. Sometimes a short secondary show would be added late in the season.

The list below contains the artists and songs featured in the various field shows for years prior to 1995. From 1995 on, the artist or theme of each primary show is listed first, and the secondary show (if available) follows in parentheses.

Under Steve Steele:

- 1985: You Are My Sunshine, Ludwig from Beethoven 9, Cats medley
- 1986: I Got Rhythm, Everybody Loves the Blues, En Sueno, Being Alive (Hoedown, Theme from the Cowboys)

Under Joe Hermann:

- 1987: Matchpoint, "One More Time" by Chick Corea, Ol' Man River
- 1988: "Who Framed Wilbur Wildcat?", Thank You Band, Elk's Parade, Malagueña

Under Eric Becher:

- 1989: Bill Chase, Blood, Sweat & Tears
- 1990: Selections from Carmen, Herb Alpert & the Tijuana Brass

Under Gregg I. Hanson and John Yoon (Head Graduate Teaching Assistant):

- 1991: Sunshine Show

Under Enrique "Hank" C. Feldman:

- 1992: Latin Salsa/Rock 'n Roll
- 1993: West Side Story
- 1994: Santana, Channel One Suite

Under Jay C. Rees:

- 1995: The Beatles (Rock 'n Roll History)
- 1996: Red Hot Chili Peppers (No Doubt - Tragic Kingdom)
- 1997: Pink Floyd (Carmina Burana)
- 1998: Smashing Pumpkins (Stevie Wonder)
- 1999: The Who: Tommy
- 2000: Danny Elfman/Oingo Boingo (Santana - Supernatural)
- 2001: Crosby, Stills, Nash, and Young (Dave Matthews Band)
- 2002: Return of Red Hot Chili Peppers (World Peace Medley)
- 2003: Teardrop (An original work for band by Jay C. Rees) (No Doubt - Rock Steady)
- 2004: Talking Heads
- 2005: Led Zeppelin
- 2006: Radiohead (Red Hot Chili Peppers - Dani California)
- 2007: Tears for Fears (Mars Lander)
- 2008: Weather Report
- 2009: Aerosmith (The Foo Fighters - The Pretender)
- 2010: Muse
- 2011: Jethro Tull
- 2012: Radiohead 2.0 (Fun.)
- 2013: Beatles Strike Back!

Under Allison Howard (interim):

- 2014: Daft Punk
- 2015: Dave Matthews Band

Under Chad Shoopman:

- 2016: Earth, Wind, & Fire
- 2017: Bruno Mars
- 2018: Justin Timberlake
- 2019: No Doubt
- 2020: (No field show due to COVID-19 pandemic)
- 2021: Panic! At The Disco
- 2022: Silk Sonic
- 2023: Evanescence
- 2024: Michael Jackson
- 2025: Lady Gaga
- 2026: RAYE

== Band Day ==
University of Arizona Band Day is a full-day marching band exhibition for high school bands to perform their half-time shows and be adjudicated by professionals in the music education field. Approximately 40 high school bands perform throughout the day at Casino Del Sol Stadium on the University of Arizona campus, and the Pride of Arizona also appears in two exhibition performances.

Bands are rated in six professional categories under the standards set forth by the Arizona Marching Band Association: Music, Visual, Percussion, Auxiliary/Color Guard, General Effect, and Placement by Band Size (small to large is division A, AA, AAA, AAAA, and AAAAA). Award ceremonies occur twice during the day after the Pride of Arizona exhibition performance and the distinguished “Nunamaker Award” is presented to the most outstanding group(s) of the festival at the end of the day.
