= Roy P. Drachman Stadium =

Sports venue in Arizona, United States

Roy P. Drachman Track and Field Stadium
- Interactive map of Roy P. Drachman; Track and Field Stadium
- Location: 501 S. Plumer Avenue; Tucson, Arizona 85719; United States
- Coordinates: 32.21510°N 110.93846°W
- Owner: University of Arizona
- Operator: Athletics Department
- Capacity: 5,000

Construction
- Opened: 1981

Tenant
- Wildcats track and field (NCAA)

The Roy P. Drachman Track and Field Stadium is an outdoor track and field facility located on the campus of University of Arizona in Tucson, Arizona, United States. The facility, built in 1981, serves as the outdoor home of the Arizona Wildcats track and field team.

== Background ==
In 1981, the Wildcats track and field program moved from Arizona Stadium to Roy P. Drachman Stadium. The facility first had the name of "Rincon Vista Stadium", however because of donations, it was renamed the Roy P. Drachman Track and Field Stadium.

The stadium was overhauled during 2006 and is a state-of-the-art facility with a nine-lane track and the latest design in field event competition areas. The seating capacity of Drachman Stadium is over 5,000.
