= 1996 NCAA Division I cross country championships =

1996 cross-country running meet of the NCAA (Division I)

1996 NCAA Division I Cross Country Championships
- Organisers: NCAA
- Edition: 58th–Men; 16th–Women
- Date: November 25, 1996
- Host city: (Arizona) Tucson, AZ
- Venue: University of Arizona; Dell Urich Golf Course
- Distances: 10 km–Men; 5 km–Women
- Participation: 177–Men; 183–Women; 360–Total athletes

The 1996 NCAA Division I Cross Country Championships were the 58th annual NCAA Men's Division I Cross Country Championship and the 16th annual NCAA Women's Division I Cross Country Championship to determine the team and individual national champions of NCAA Division I men's and women's collegiate cross country running in the United States. In all, four different titles were contested: men's and women's individual and team championships.

Held on November 25, 1996, the combined meet was hosted by the University of Arizona at Dell Urich Golf Course in Tucson, Arizona. The distance for the men's race was 10 kilometers (6.21 miles) while the distance for the women's race was 5 kilometers (3.11 miles).

The men's team championship was won by Stanford (46 points), their first. The women's team championship was also won by Stanford (101 points), also their first. This was the first time since 1985 (Wisconsin) that the same program won the men's and women's titles.

The two individual champions were, for the men, Godfrey Siamusiye (Arkansas, 29:49) and, for the women, Amy Skieresz (Arizona, 17:04). This was Siamusiye's second consecutive win.

== Men's title ==
- Distance: 10,000 meters

=== Men's Team Result (Top 10) ===
Rank	Team	Points
1st place, gold medalist(s)	Stanford	46
2nd place, silver medalist(s)	Arkansas	74
3rd place, bronze medalist(s)	Oregon	140
4	Oklahoma State	158
5	Colorado	179
6	Wisconsin	204
7	Nebraska	209
8	Boise State	223
9	Notre Dame	248
10	Portland	261

=== Men's Individual Result (Top 10) ===
Rank	Name	Team	Time
1st place, gold medalist(s)	(Zambia) Godfrey Siamusiye	Arkansas	29:49
2nd place, silver medalist(s)	(Kenya) Jonah Kiptarus	Nebraska	30:20
3rd place, bronze medalist(s)	(Kenya) Cleophas Boor	Nebraska	30:24
4	(United States) Gregory Jimmerson	Stanford	30:38
5	(United States) Matt Davis	Oregon	30:43
6	(United States) Brad Hauser	Stanford	30:44
7	(Canada) Sean Kaley	Arkansas	30:47
8	(United States) Ryan Wilson	Arkansas	30:47
9	(United States) Jeremy White	Stanford	30:49
10	(Eritrea) Meb Keflezighi	UCLA	31:00

== Women's title ==
- Distance: 5,000 meters

=== Women's Team Result (Top 10) ===
Rank	Team	Points
1st place, gold medalist(s)	Stanford	101
2nd place, silver medalist(s)	Villanova	106
3rd place, bronze medalist(s)	BYU	136
4	Colorado	145
5	Dartmouth	211
6	Arizona (H)	214
7	Providence	219
8	Wisconsin	226
9	Georgetown	247
10	Northern Arizona	261

- (H) – Host team

=== Women's Individual Result (Top 10) ===
Rank	Name	Team	Time
1st place, gold medalist(s)	(United States) Amy Skieresz	Arizona	17:04
2nd place, silver medalist(s)	(Republic of Ireland) Marie McMahon	Providence	17:20
3rd place, bronze medalist(s)	(United States) Joanna Deeter	Notre Dame	17:24
4	(United States) Kristino Jost	Villanova	17:29
5	(United States) Carrie Tollefson	Villanova	17:43
6	(United States) Marisa Avenado	CSU, Sacramento	17:49
7	(Ethiopia) Emebet Guilliat-Shiferaw	USC	17:53
8	(United States) Laura Rhodes	NC State	17:53
9	(Denmark) Rikke Peterson	Northern Arizona	17:54
10	(United States) Monal Chokshi	Stanford	17:58
