= Rod Barksdale =

American football player (born 1962)

No. 88, 80
- Position: Wide receiver

Personal information
- Born: September 8, 1962 (age 64); Los Angeles, California, U.S.
- Listed height: 6 ft 1 in (1.85 m)
- Listed weight: 189 lb (86 kg)

Career information
- High school: Compton (Compton, California)
- College: Arizona (track)
- NFL draft: 1985: undrafted

Career history
- Los Angeles Raiders (1985–1986); Dallas Cowboys (1987–1988); Los Angeles Raiders (1990)*
- * Offseason or practice squad member only

Awards and highlights
- 3× Track All-American (1982, 1983, 1984)

Career NFL statistics
- Receptions: 30
- Receiving yards: 599
- Touchdowns: 3
- Stats at Pro Football Reference

Rod Barksdale (born September 8, 1962) is an American former professional football player who was a wide receiver in the National Football League (NFL) for the Los Angeles Raiders and Dallas Cowboys. He practiced track & field in college with the Arizona Wildcats.

== Early life ==
Barksdale attended Compton High School where he was a track and field All-American. In 1980, he finished second in state in the 440-yard dash. He did not play football in high school or college.

He accepted a track scholarship from the University of Arizona. He was originally a 400 metres athlete, but switched his specialty after clocking 20.1 seconds in a 200 metres practice run. He also ran in the 100 metres events.

In 1984, he posted individual bests of 20.3 seconds in the 200 metres and 46.1 seconds in the 400 metres. He finished sixth in the 200 metres and was a member of the 4 × 100 metres relay team that finished third in the NCAA Championships. He received All-American honors and competed in the 1984 Olympic trials, but pulled a muscle in the 100-meter dash semifinals and failed to qualify.

== Professional career ==
=== Los Angeles Raiders (first stint) ===
In 1985, he received a tryout invitation by the Los Angeles Raiders after writing them a letter, where he ran the 40-yard dash in 4.3 seconds and was signed as an undrafted free agent. As a rookie, he was placed on the injured reserve list with an ankle injury.

The next year, he had a notable preseason and made the team. In the season opener against the Denver Broncos, he caught a 57-yard touchdown pass from quarterback Marc Wilson. Even though he was considered as a raw player, he still appeared in all 16 games with 15 starts, registering 18 receptions for 434 yards and 2 touchdowns.

At the start of his third season, a surplus of wide receivers made him expendable in the eyes of Raiders management. On August 2, 1987, he was traded to the Dallas Cowboys in exchange for cornerback Ron Fellows.

=== Dallas Cowboys ===
In 1987, he was acquired by the Dallas Cowboys for depth purposes, after the team waived wide receiver Tony Hill. Even though the team lost wide receivers Mike Sherrard and Ray Alexander during the preseason, Barksdale still couldn't earn a starting job, appearing in 15 games with one start, while posting 12 receptions for 165 yards and one touchdown.

The next year, he injured his right knee in the Blue-White scrimmage and was placed on the injured reserve list. He was waived on July 10, 1989.

=== Los Angeles Raiders (second stint) ===
In 1990, he was signed as a free agent by the Los Angeles Raiders and was released on August 28.

== Personal life ==
After football, he started a video surveillance company.
