= Arizona Wildcat men's cross country =

Arizona Wildcats Men's Cross Country
- University: University of Arizona
- Head coach: Bernard Lagat
- Conference: Pac-12
- Location: Tucson, Arizona
- Nickname: Wildcats
- Colors: Cardinal and navy

Men's NCAA appearances
- 1972, 1976, 1977, 1978, 1980, 1981, 1982, 1983, 1984, 1985, 1986, 1987, 1990 ,1991, 1992, 1994, 1998, 1999, 2000, 2001, 2003, 2005, 2006

Men's conference champions
- 1983, 1984, 1986, 1987, 1991, 1994, 1999

Arizona Wildcats Men's Cross Country represents the University of Arizona and competes in the Big 12 Conference. The team is current coached by five-time Olympian Bernard Lagat who specializes in middle and long-distance runner.

== Notable athletes ==
Men's individual national championships
Year	Athlete	League
1986	Aaron Ramirez	NCAA
1994	Martin Keino	NCAA
2011	Lawi Lalang	NCAA

Men's individual conference champions
Year	Athlete	Conference
1984	Tom Ansberry	Pac-10
1986	Aaron Ramirez	Pac-10
1987	Matt Giusto	Pac-10
1989	Marc Davis	Pac-10
1990	Marc Davis (2)	Pac-10
1994	Martin Keino	Pac-10
1998	Abdi Abdirahman	Pac-10
2004	Robert Cheseret	Pac-10
2005	Robert Cheseret (2)	Pac-10
2011	Lawi Lalang	Pac-12
2012	Lawi Lalang (2)	Pac-12

Pac-12 Athlete of the Year
Year	Athlete
1984	Tom Ansberry
1986	Aaron Ramirez
1987	Matt Giusto
1989	Marc Davis
1990	Marc Davis
1991	Martin Keino
1994	Martin Keino
1998	Abdi Abdirahman
2004	Robert Cheseret
2005	Robert Cheseret
2010	Stephen Sambu
2011	Lawi Lalang
2012	Lawi Lalang

Pac-12 Newcomer/Freshman of the Year
Year	Athlete
2003	Robert Cheseret
2004	Mohamed Trafeh
2010	Stephen Sambu
2011	Lawi Lalang

Pac-12 Scholar Athlete of the Year
Year	Athlete
2014	Sam Macaluso

=== Pac-12 All-Conference ===
- Micheil Jones: 1999
- Brent Pedersen: 1999
- Tom Prindiville: 1999, 2000
- David Lopez: 1999, 2000
- Steve Smith: 1999, 2000
- Kyle Goklish: 2001
- Jonah Maiyo: 2003, 2005
- Robert Cheseret: 2003, 2004, 2005, 2006
- Obed Mutanya: 2005, 2006
- Stephen Sambu: 2010, 2012
- Lawi Lalang: 2011, 2012
- Victor Ortiz-Rivera: 2020

=== Olympians ===
Athlete	Olympics	Event	Place
George Young (United States)	1960	Steeplechase	
George Young (United States)	1964	Steeplechase	5th
George Young (United States)	1968	Marathon	16th
George Young (United States)	1968	Steeplechase	(bronze) Bronze
George Young (United States)	1972	5000m	
Ed Mendoza (United States)	1976	10,000m	
Aaron Ramirez (United States)	1992	10,000m	
Matt Giusto (United States)	1996	5000m	
Marc Davis (United States)	1996	Steeplechase	
Abdi Abdirahman (United States)	2000	10,000m	10th
Abdi Abdirahman (United States)	2004	10,000m	15th
Abdi Abdirahman (United States)	2008	10,000m	15th
Abdi Abdirahman (United States)	2012	Marathon	DNF
Abdi Abdirahman (United States)	2021	Marathon	40th

== Year by year results ==
Men's
Year	Conference Finish	Points	NCAA Finish	Points
Western Athletic Conference
1962	1st	52		
1963	2nd	54		
1964	5th	123		
1965	5th	122		
1966	2nd	58		
1967	5th	113		
1968	4th	90		
1969	4th	112		
1970	6th	143		
1971	2nd	67		
1972	2nd	48	20th	439
1973	T-4th	99		
1974	7th	142		
1975	6th	132		
1976	3rd	94	7th	324
1977	4th	101	9th	262
Pac-10 Conference
1978	3th	79	7th	248
1979	5th	130		
1980	2nd	59	22nd	484
1981	2nd	60	7th	253
1982	3th	80	11th	272
1983	1st	38	T-14th	322
1984	1st	44	2nd	111
1985	4th	128	4th	175
1986	1st	49	6th	224
1987	1st	32	6th	244
1988	5th	133		
1989	3rd	91		
1990	2nd	41	21st	484
1991	1st	45	T-4th	236
1992	2nd	51	18th	388
1993	7th	156		
1994	1st	49	3rd	172
1995	3rd	87		
1996	5th	112		
1997	5th	113		
1998	3rd	90	11th	348
1999	1st	36	10th	346
2000	3rd	70	12th	419
2001	4th	96	21st	486
2002	7th	176		
2003	4th	109	23rd	536
2004	6th	138		
2005	2nd	78	10th	384
2006	3rd	107	21st	517
2007	8th	260		
2008	7th	180		
2009	8th	193		
2010	8th	195		
Pac-12 Conference
2011	8th	190		
2012	7th	166		
2013	8th	194		
2014	8th	206		
2015	9th	271		
2016	9th	234		
2017	8th	234		
2018	8th	213		
2019	8th	240		
2020	8th	201		
2021	DNP			
2022	7th	213		
2023	7th	195		
Big 12 Conference
2024	9th	280		
2025	8th	214		
