= Bear Down =

Official motto of the Arizona Wildcats

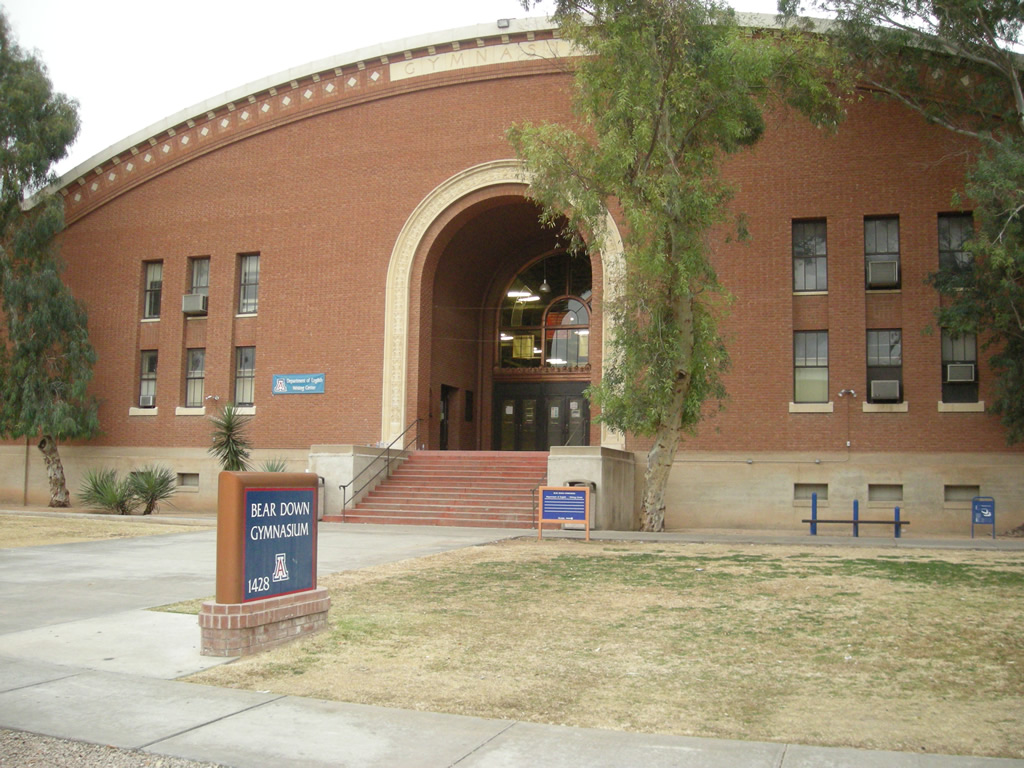
Bear Down Gym, listed on the National Register of Historic Places

"Bear Down" is the official motto of the Arizona Wildcats, located in Tucson, Arizona. It is the inspiration for "Bear Down, Arizona!," the unofficial fight song of the University of Arizona (U of A). The official fight song is "Fight! Wildcats! Fight!" written by Douglas Holsclaw.

== History ==
John Byrd "Button" Salmon was the student body president, as well as the starting quarterback for the Wildcat football team and the catcher for the Wildcat baseball team, and member of Sigma Nu fraternity and #12 in Chain Gang Junior Honorary, now known as Links Junior Honorary.

The day after the first game of the 1926 football season, Salmon and two others were involved in an automobile accident, in which their vehicle flipped over in a ravine. Although Salmon's friends were not injured, Salmon suffered a severe spinal cord injury. In the aftermath of the accident, football coach Pop McKale visited him in the hospital every day. During McKale's last visit, Salmon's last message to his teammates was, "Tell them.. tell the team to bear down." John Salmon died on October 18, 1926. Following Salmon's funeral, McKale reportedly told the team what he had said in a Las Cruces, N.M., locker room before a football game against the Aggies of New Mexico State, and U of A won a hard-fought victory, 7-0.

The following year, the University of Arizona student body adopted the slogan for use with all Wildcat athletic teams. That year, the Chain Gang, a junior honorary organization at the UA, held a dance in the newly constructed university gymnasium to raise funds to paint the slogan on the roof of the building. Links Junior Honorary (formerly known as Chain Gang) still holds this dance annually. The words are still featured on the roof of the gymnasium, now known as Bear Down Gym.

In 2013 Arizona's football stadium installed a new artificial surface with "Bear Down" etched in the center of the field and running from end to end between the 15-yard lines. Previously the phrase was painted on the field in two separate areas. Before the 2022 season, the artificial surface was renovated and "Bear Down" returned to the painted sideline alongside each 20-yard line.

== Fight song ==
The song "Bear Down, Arizona!" was written by Jack K. Lee, the university's future band director, in 1952. As related by Lee himself in later years, Lee was one of several applicants for the position of Director of Bands at the U of A. During his visit to the university for his job interview, he was given a tour of the campus and was told the story of the Bear Down slogan. As his flight home to Michigan left from the Tucson airport, it banked over the university campus, and Lee saw the slogan painted on the roof of the university gymnasium. He was struck by inspiration, took an airsickness bag from the seat pocket of the plane and wrote, in pencil, the lyrics to "Bear Down, Arizona." Lee was offered the band director job. The song was publicly performed in September 1952 for the first time by U of A band at a pep rally in downtown Tucson. A replica of the original manuscript, created by Lee on a paper sack, is displayed in the Alumni Heritage Lounge on the main floor of the Student Union Memorial Center on the university campus.

=== Lyrics ===
Arizona, bear down!
Let's cheer for Arizona,
Let's raise our voices high!
Let's cheer for Arizona,
That bear down battle cry!
Let's cheer our team to victory!
Let's cheer our team to fame!
Let's cheer for Arizona,
For spirit wins the game!

Chorus:
Bear down, Arizona!
Bear down, red and blue!
Bear down, Arizona!
Hit 'em hard let 'em know who's who!
Bear down, Arizona!
Bear down, red and blue!
Go, go, Wildcats go!
Arizona, bear down!

Although the following coda is not actually a part of the song, the band (along with the crowd) chants it immediately after they have played "Bear Down". Part of the chant originates in a 1988 rap song about the Arizona basketball team, written by Harvey Mason Jr.

A-R-I-Z-O-N-A!
A-R-I-Z-O-N-A!
A-R-I-Z-O-N-A!
Go A-R-I-Z-O-N-A!
W-I-L-D Cats! (Say what?)
W-I-L-D Wildcats! (That's right!)
W-I-L-D Cats!
We're wild about those Cats!

The verse of the song is rarely sung. At most athletic events, the chorus is sung twice, followed by the chant.
