= Brianna Glenn =

American long jumper (born 1980)

Brianna Glenn (born April 18, 1980) is an American long jumper. She finished ninth at the 2002 World Cup and seventh at the 2006 World Athletics Final. Her personal best jump is 6.87 metres, achieved in June 2011 at the United States Olympic Training Center in Chula Vista, California.

Representing the Arizona Wildcats track and field team, Glenn became the first ever athlete to win the long jump and a sprint event at the NCAA Division I Women's Outdoor Track and Field Championships.

Brianna also holds a personal best in the 100m of 11.10 seconds.

Brianna is an active model and has been in a Sports Illustrated Budweiser campaign as an Olympic hopeful. The campaign was a part of the Sports Illustrated swimsuit edition in 2008.
