= Fight! Wildcats! Fight! =

Official fight song of the University of Arizona

"Fight! Wildcats! Fight!" is the official fight song of the University of Arizona. While "Bear Down, Arizona!" is easily the most recognizable fight song attributed to the university it was written 23 years after "Fight!" and is more accurately described as the official motto of the Arizona Wildcats.

== History ==
The words to "Fight! Wildcats! Fight!" were written in 1929 by Dugald "Douglas" Stanley Holsclaw, class of '25 and a member of the spirit squad (serving as the "Yell Leader" from 1923 to 1924). Holsclaw and his wife Alice contributed greatly to the University of Arizona and to the state of Arizona itself. Holsclaw went on to serve as a state senator for many years. The Holsclaw family has been honored by the university with an endowed chair in the genetics department and a recital hall in the Music Building. "Fight! Wildcats! Fight!" was officially introduced by the UA band at the 1930 Homecoming game and was also performed by Rudy Vallee and his orchestra over the NBC radio network that same year.

The music to "Fight! Wildcats! Fight!" was co-written by Holsclaw and Thornton W. Allen, a composer, arranger, and publisher based in New York. Allen was responsible for the music for various collegiate fight songs including those for the University of Maryland, University of Florida, and Washington and Lee University.

=== Lyrics ===
The lyrics to "Fight! Wildcats! Fight!" consists of a verse and chorus. Originally the verse had two versions: One for students or other members of the university, and another version for the "Towncats", the now-defunct alumni club of the University of Arizona. The chorus also features different lyrics depending on whether it is being performed at a football game or basketball game.

Hail Arizona Wildcats
Fighting for old UA.
A raging team of Wildcats
Growling for the fray
There's not a team can stop them
When the ball goes into play
So Fight! Team!
Fight with all your might
And win today.

Fight Wildcats, Fight for Arizona
We're with you ever staunch and true
This day we hail you and we cheer you
They can't defeat the Red and Blue
Circle the ends and crash through center
Hit hard and gain on ev'ry play
Fight Wildcats!
Fight! Fight! Fight!
We'll win today!
