= Wilbur and Wilma =

University Mascots

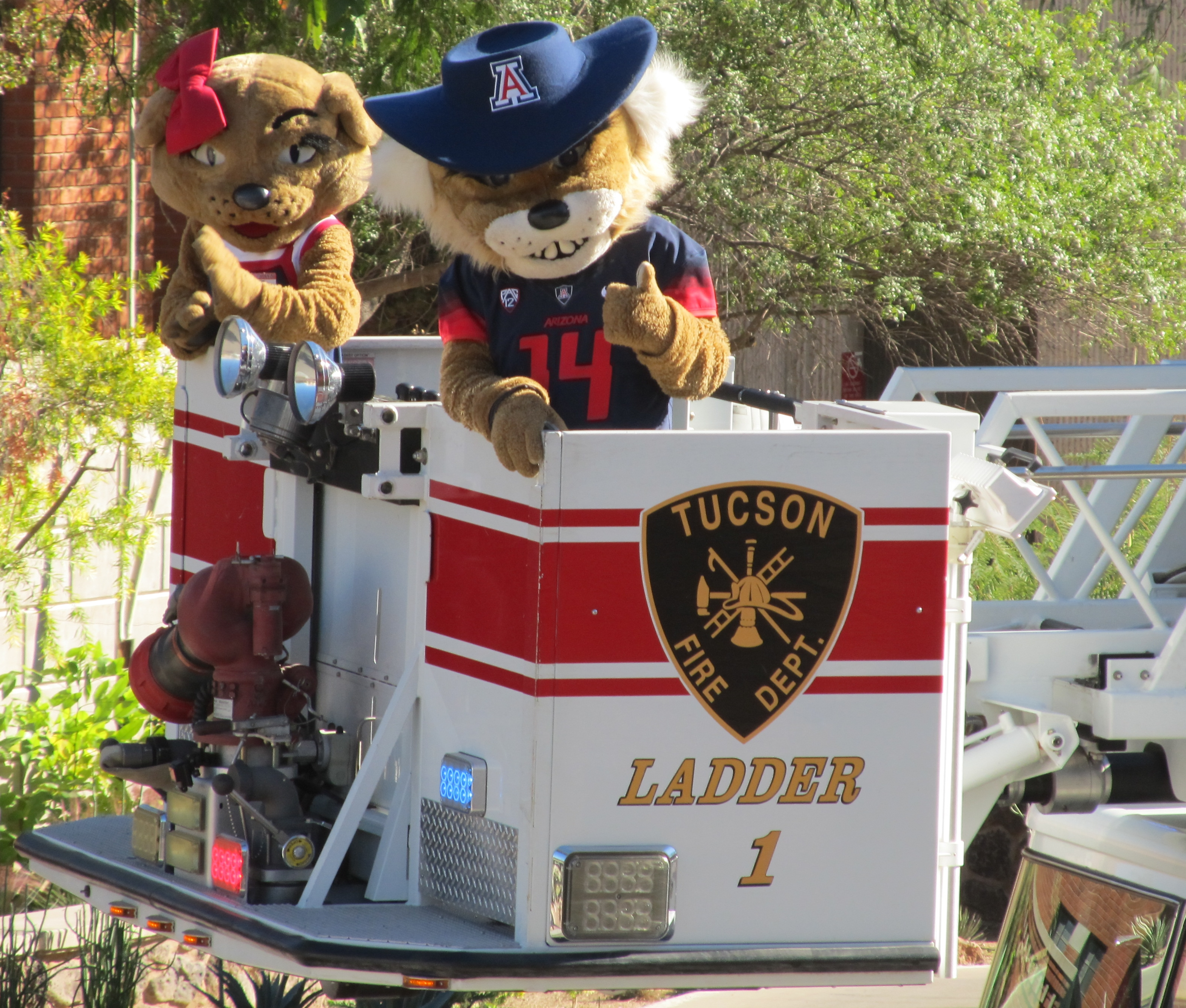
- Team: Arizona Wildcats
- University: University of Arizona
- Conference: Big 12
- Description: Anthropomorphic North American wildcats
- First seen: 1959
- Website: http://arizonaalumni.com/blog/wilbur-t-wildcat

Autograph
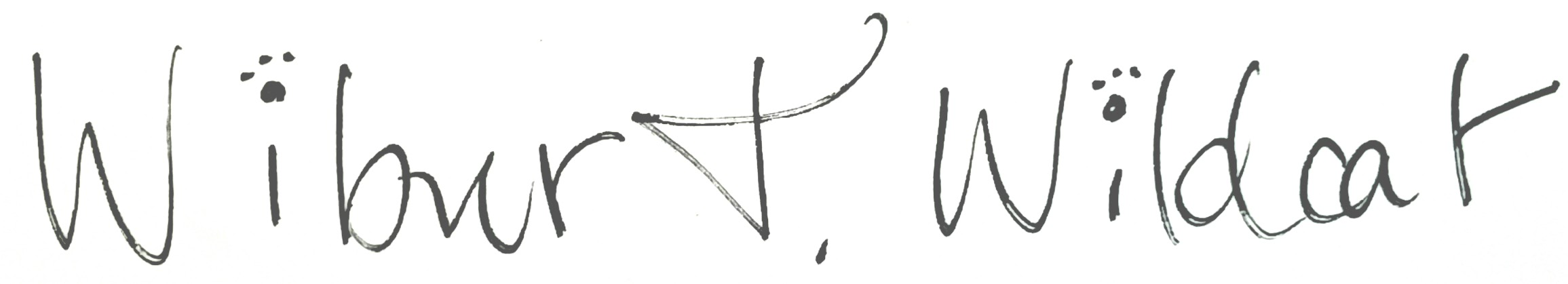

Wilbur and Wilma T. Wildcat are the official mascots at the University of Arizona in Tucson, Arizona.

== History ==
In 1915, the school's first mascot, a live desert bobcat named "Tom Easter" was brought to campus. He was later renamed "Rufus Arizona" after then U of A president Rufus B. von KleinSmid. For the next fifty years, the school used live mascots, a practice which was discontinued in the 1960s. However, in 1959, Wilbur, the costumed version of the live bobcat mascots, began appearing at football games. He was extremely popular, and has stayed ever since. In 1986, Wilma Wildcat was created, and was even married to Wilbur.

Originally, in honor of Arizona's Old West heritage, Wilbur wore a blue flat-topped cowboy hat, a blue vest, a cardinal bandana scarf around his neck and a holster with two pistols. Recently, Wilbur and Wilma have taken to wearing the teams' athletics jerseys instead of their traditional outfits, both as a sign of team spirit and to avoid references to gun violence. However, the hat remains on Wilbur, and Wilma wears a cardinal-colored bow.

== Naming ==
The mascots' full names are Wilbur the Wildcat and Wilma the Wildcat, but they are often abbreviated to Wilbur T. Wildcat and Wilma T. Wildcat. Fans normally refer to the mascots simply as Wilbur and Wilma.

== Identity ==
The identities of the students portraying Wilbur and Wilma are kept confidential until the final home basketball game of the season.
