= Božidar Antunović =

Serbian shot putter (born 1991)

Božidar Antunović Божидар Антуновић
Personal information
- Nationality: Serbian
- Born: 24 July 1991 (age 35) Novi Sad, SR Serbia, Yugoslavia
- Height: 6 ft 6 in (198 cm)
- Weight: 292 lb (132 kg; 20 st 12 lb)
- Football career

Profile
- Position: Offensive lineman

Career information
- College: SMU (2015)

Sport
- Country: Serbia
- Sport: Athletics (Track and field)
- Event: Shot put

Achievements and titles
- Personal bests: Shot put - 19.85 m (outdoor), 20.02 (indoor)
Medal record
Representing Serbia
World Junior Championships
Silver medal – second place	2010 Moncton	Shot put

Božidar Antunović (Serbian Cyrillic: Божидар Антуновић, born July 24, 1991) is a Serbian shot puter. He was a silver medalist at the World Junior Championships in Moncton, Canada.

He studied at the University of Arizona, where he was a 2-time consecutive NCAA All-American in Track and Field.

He then transferred to Southern Methodist University, where he played football, and earned his Bachelor of Science.

Antunović also competed for the UT Arlington Mavericks track and field team.

== Competition record ==
Year	Competition	Venue	Position	Event	Notes
Representing Serbia
2010	World Junior Championships	Moncton, Canada	2nd	Shot put (6 kg)	20.20 m
2012	European Championships	Helsinki, Finland	21st (q)	Shot put	18.69 m
