= Amy Skieresz =

American middle-distance runner

Personal information
- Born: June 13, 1976 (age 50)
- Home town: Agoura, California, U.S.

Sport
- Country: United States
- Sport: Track and field, Cross Country
- Event(s): 3000m, 5000m, 10000m
- College team: University of Arizona

Achievements and titles
- Personal bests: 1500 m: 4:28.06 (Tempe 1997); 3000 m: 9:11.92 (Nice 1999); 5000 m: 15:37.77 (Buffalo 1998); 10000 m: 32:31.65 (Philadelphia 1997); Half marathon: 1:14:30 (Indianapolis, 2005); Marathon: 2:42:47 (Long Beach 2004)

Amy Skieresz (born June 13, 1976) is a retired American middle- and long-distance runner.

Skieresz is a seven-time NCAA national champion and ten-time All-American in cross country and track and field while competing for the University of Arizona from 1995 to 1998.

== High school career ==
Skieresz attended Agoura High School in Agoura Hills, California. She placed top-5 in the California State Championships three times, including winning the state title as a junior. She led her Agoura team to the team title in her freshman and sophomore seasons. As a sophomore, Skieresz placed 3rd in the Footlocker National Cross Country Championships and was 14th as a senior. She was a member of the United States team that competed in the World Cross Country Junior Race in Amorebieta, Spain in 1993, finishing as the top American in 39th place.

== College career ==
Skieresz continued her running career at the University of Arizona. As a freshman, she finished second in the NCAA Cross Country Championships. Her track season was derailed by a foot injury that prevented her from competing at the NCAA Championships.

As a sophomore, Skieresz became the first female in NCAA history to win four national championships in the same school year. She began by winning the NCAA Cross Country Championships by 16 seconds, one of the largest margins of victory ever. Skieresz added the NCAA Indoor 5000m title with a new collegiate record time, then finished the year by capturing both the 5000m and 10000m titles at the NCAA Outdoor Championships. Following the season, she competed in the Olympic Trials in the 5000m where she finished 11th.

In her junior season, Skieresz finished runner-up at the NCAA Cross Country Championships for the second time. She then proceeded to repeat as indoor 5000m champion and outdoor 5000m and 10000m champion. She remains the only NCAA female to ever accomplish the outdoor 5000m/10000m double twice. Her margins of victory during her 10000m victories, 63.59 seconds in 1997 and 62.64 seconds in 1998, are the largest in NCAA history of any event including cross country.

Ahead of what was to be the last race of her collegiate career, Skieresz was suffering pain in her right thigh. She decided to compete in the NCAA Cross Country Championships despite the issue and finished runner-up for the third time. In doing so, she became the only runner, male or female, to ever finish in the top-2 at the NCAA Cross Country Championships four times. A few weeks later, doctors diagnosed her injury as a benign tumor in her thigh. She decided to forgo the remainder of her collegiate eligibility and begin preparations for the 2000 Olympic Trials.

Skieresz only lost four races in her entire collegiate career, three of which were runner-up finishes at the NCAA Cross Country Championships. In addition to her seven NCAA championships, she also won seven PAC-10 championships, including four in cross country and three on the track. Despite only competing for eight seasons (four cross country, two indoor track, two outdoor track), she is one of only five women to win seven or more NCAA championships in a career as a distance runner. As of March 2024, she still holds Arizona school records in the indoor 5000m and outdoor 10000m, and previously held the record in the outdoor 5000m.

Year	Pac-10 Cross Country	NCAA Cross Country	NCAA Indoor Track	Pac-10 Outdoor Track	NCAA Outdoor Track
1995–96	1st	2nd	-	-	-
1996–97	1st	1st	1st - 5000m	1st - 5000m; 1st - 3000m	1st - 5000m; 1st - 10000m
1997–98	1st	2nd	1st - 5000m	1st - 5000m	1st - 5000m; 1st - 10000m
1998–99	1st	2nd	-	-	-

== Post college ==
Skieresz began a professional career with the Nike Project but decided to retire prior to the 2000 Olympic Trials. In 2004, she joined the coaching staff at the University of Arizona and made a brief return to running, winning the Long Beach Marathon in 2:42:47.

== Honors and awards ==
- University of Arizona Athletic Hall of Fame
- USTFCCCA Collegiate Hall of Fame
- Pac-12 Women's Cross Country Runner of the Century
- Pac-10 T&F Athlete of year – 1997, 1998
- Honda Sports Award: Cross Country 1997, 1998
- Honda Sports Award: Track and Field 1997, 1998

== Personal life ==
Skieresz married former University of Arkansas All-American Ryan Wilson, himself an NCAA champion in the indoor 3000m. The couple has three children.
