= 2024 NCAA Division I Outdoor Track and Field Championships =

College track and field competition

- Edition: 102nd (Men); 42nd (Women)
- Dates: June 5–8, 2024
- Host city: Eugene, Oregon; University of Oregon
- Venue: Hayward Field
- Events: 42 (21 men's and 21 women's)

The 2024 NCAA Division I Outdoor Track and Field Championships was the 102nd NCAA Division I Men's Outdoor Track and Field Championships and the 42nd NCAA Division I Women's Outdoor Track and Field Championships held at Hayward Field in Eugene, Oregon on the campus of the University of Oregon. 42 events (21 men's and 21 women's) were contested from Wednesday, June 5 until Saturday, June 8, starting with the men's decathlon and ending with the women's 4 × 400-meter relay. Men's events were held Wednesday and Friday, and women's events were held Thursday and Saturday, with the exception of the men's decathlon which extended from Wednesday into Thursday and the women's heptathlon which began Friday and ended Saturday.

== Streaming and television coverage ==
ESPN streamed most events on ESPN2, ESPN3, and ESPNU.

== Results ==
=== Men ===
==== Men's 100 meters ====
Placings in the men's 100 meters at the 2024 NCAA Division I Outdoor Track and Field Championships
Rank	Athlete	Nationality	Team	Time	Notes
1st place, gold medalist(s)	Louie Hinchliffe	Great Britain	Houston Cougars	9.95	PB
2nd place, silver medalist(s)	Favour Ashe	Nigeria	Auburn Tigers	9.99	
3rd place, bronze medalist(s)	Kayinsola Ajayi	Nigeria	Auburn Tigers	10.01	PB
4	Godson Oghenebrume	Nigeria	LSU Tigers	10.02 [.013]	
5	Saminu Abdul-Rasheed	Ghana	South Florida Bulls	10.02 [.019]	PB
6	Wanya McCoy	Bahamas	Florida Gators	10.03	
7	Shaun Maswanganyi	South Africa	Houston Cougars	10.05	
8	Zachaeus Beard	United States	Northwestern State Demons	10.10	
9	Lance Lang	United States	Arkansas Razorbacks	10.15	
				Wind: (+0.2 m/s)	

==== Men's 200 meters ====
Placings in the men's 200 meters at the 2024 NCAA Division I Outdoor Track and Field Championships
Rank	Athlete	Nationality	Team	Time	Notes
1st place, gold medalist(s)	Cheickna Traore	Ivory Coast	Penn State Nittany Lions	19.95	
2nd place, silver medalist(s)	Robert Gregory	United States	Florida Gators	20.08	SB
3rd place, bronze medalist(s)	Saminu Abdul-Rasheed	Ghana	South Florida Bulls	20.12	PB
4	Tarsis Orogot	Uganda	Alabama Crimson Tide	20.14	
5	Makanakaishe Charamba	Zimbabwe	Auburn Tigers	20.20	
6	Shaun Maswanganyi	South Africa	Houston Cougars	20.25	
7	Jamarion Stubbs	United States	Alabama State Hornets	20.59	
8	Lance Lang	United States	Arkansas Razorbacks	20.67	
9	Wanya McCoy	Bahamas	Florida Gators	20.98	
				Wind: (−0.1 m/s)	

==== Men's 400 meters ====
Placings in the men's 400 meters at the 2024 NCAA Division I Outdoor Track and Field Championships
Rank	Athlete	Nationality	Team	Time	Notes
1st place, gold medalist(s)	Christopher Morales-Williams	Canada	Georgia Bulldogs	44.47	
2nd place, silver medalist(s)	Samuel Ogazi	Nigeria	Alabama Crimson Tide	44.52	PB
3rd place, bronze medalist(s)	Jevaughn Powell	Jamaica	Florida Gators	44.54	PB
4	Johnnie Blockberger	United States	USC Trojans	44.90	
5	Judson Lincoln IV	United States	Virginia Tech Hokies	45.31	
6	Emmanuel Bynum	United States	Tennessee Volunteers	45.75	
7	Reheem Hayes	Jamaica	Florida Gators	45.78	
8	Justin Robinson	United States	Arizona State Sun Devils	45.92	
9	Auhmaud Robinson	United States	Texas A&M Aggies	–	DQ 15.5-2b

==== Men's 800 meters ====
Placings in the men's 800 meters at the 2024 NCAA Division I Outdoor Track and Field Championships
Rank	Athlete	Nationality	Team	Time	Notes
1st place, gold medalist(s)	Shane Cohen	United States	Virginia Cavaliers	1:44.97	PB
2nd place, silver medalist(s)	Sam Whitmarsh	United States	Texas A&M Aggies	1:45.10	
3rd place, bronze medalist(s)	Finley McLear	Great Britain	Iowa State Cyclones	1:45.66	PB
4	Tarees Rhoden	Jamaica	Clemson Tigers	1:45.70	PB
5	Sean Dolan	United States	Villanova Wildcats	1:45.89	
6	Yusuf Bizimana	Great Britain	Texas Longhorns	1:46.37	
7	Kimar Farquharson	Jamaica	Texas A&M Aggies	1:46.38	
8	Nicholas Plant	United States	Virginia Tech Hokies	1:47.00	
9	Camden Marshall	United States	Indiana Hoosiers	2:04.27	

==== Men's 1500 meters ====
Placings in the men's 1500 meters at the 2024 NCAA Division I Outdoor Track and Field Championships
Rank	Athlete	Nationality	Team	Time	Notes
1st place, gold medalist(s)	Joe Waskom	United States	Washington Huskies	3:39.48	
2nd place, silver medalist(s)	Elliott Cook	United States	Oregon Ducks	3:39.57	
3rd place, bronze medalist(s)	Adam Spencer	Australia	Wisconsin Badgers	3:39.80	
4	Colin Sahlman	United States	Northern Arizona Lumberjacks	3:39.92	
5	Damien Dilcher	United States	Iona Gaels	3:40.24	
6	Wes Porter	United States	Virginia Cavaliers	3:40.39	
7	Ezekiel Rop	Kenya	Iowa State Cyclones	3:40.50	
8	Anass Essayi	Morocco	South Carolina Gamecocks	3:40.81	
9	Ethan Strand	United States	North Carolina Tar Heels	3:40.90	
10	Nathan Green	United States	Washington Huskies	3:40.98	
11	Liam Murphy	United States	Villanova Wildcats	3:42.90	
12	Luke Houser	United States	Washington Huskies	3:48.86	

==== Men's 5000 meters ====
Placings in the men's 5000 meters at the 2024 NCAA Division I Outdoor Track and Field Championships
Rank	Athlete	Nationality	Team	Time	Notes
1st place, gold medalist(s)	Parker Wolfe	United States	North Carolina Tar Heels	13:54.43	
2nd place, silver medalist(s)	Nico Young	United States	Northern Arizona Lumberjacks	13:54.65	
3rd place, bronze medalist(s)	Ky Robinson	Australia	Stanford Cardinal	13:55.00	
4	Brian Musau	Kenya	Oklahoma State Cowboys	13:57.42	
5	Graham Blanks	United States	Harvard Crimson	13:57.81	
6	Habtom Samuel	Eritrea	New Mexico Lobos	13:58.83	
7	Toby Gillen	Australia	Ole Miss Rebels	13:59.00	
8	Jesse Hamlin	United States	Butler Bulldogs	13:59.11	
9	Cael Grotenhuis	United States	Northern Arizona Lumberjacks	13:59.63	
10	Jackson Sharp	Australia	Wisconsin Badgers	14:01.48	
11	Yaseen Abdalla	Sudan	Tennessee Volunteers	14:01.54	
12	Wil Smith	United States	Gonzaga Bulldogs	14:02.70	
13	Said Mechaal	Spain	Iowa State Cyclones	14:03.41	
14	Brodey Hasty	United States	Northern Arizona Lumberjacks	14:04.07	
15	Chandler Gibbens	United States	Kansas Jayhawks	14:04.20	
16	Rocky Hansen	United States	Wake Forest Demon Deacons	14:04.44	
17	Alex Maier	United States	Oklahoma State Cowboys	14:04.87	
18	David Mullarkey	Great Britain	Florida State Seminoles	14:05.77	
19	Dylan Schubert	United States	Furman Paladins	14:06.41	
20	Aidan Troutner	United States	BYU Cougars	14:07.16	
21	Marco Langon	United States	Villanova Wildcats	14:10.41	
22	Acer Iverson	United States	Harvard Crimson	14:10.93	
23	Nickolas Scudder	United States	Charlotte 49ers	14:15.40	
24	Nicholas Bendtsen	United States	Princeton Tigers	14:16.96	

==== Men's 10000 meters ====
Placings in the men's 10000 meters at the 2024 NCAA Division I Outdoor Track and Field Championships
Rank	Athlete	Nationality	Team	Time	Notes
1st place, gold medalist(s)	Habtom Samuel	Eritrea	New Mexico Lobos	28:07.82	
2nd place, silver medalist(s)	Victor Kiprop	Kenya	Alabama Crimson Tide	28:08.59	
3rd place, bronze medalist(s)	Denis Kipngetich	Kenya	Oklahoma State Cowboys	28:10.25	PB
4	Ernest Cheruiyot	Kenya	Texas Tech Red Raiders	28:10.81	
5	Chandler Gibbens	United States	Kansas Jayhawks	28:10.87	PB
6	Ian Kibiwot	Kenya	Louisville Cardinals	28:11.65	PB
7	Sanele Masondo	South Africa	Iowa State Cyclones	28:13.29	PB
8	Patrick Kiprop	Kenya	Arkansas Razorbacks	28:13.99	
9	Alex Maier	United States	Oklahoma State Cowboys	28:14.81	
10	Kirami Yego	Kenya	Arkansas Razorbacks	28:17.53	PB
11	Aaron Las Heras	Spain	Northern Arizona Lumberjacks	28:19.14	PB
12	Alex Phillip	United States	North Carolina Tar Heels	28:21.16	
13	Tyler Berg	United States	Notre Dame Fighting Irish	28:23.59	PB
14	Cael Grotenhuis	United States	Northern Arizona Lumberjacks	28:31.64	PB
15	Tom Brady	United States	Michigan Wolverines	28:44.35	
16	Valentín Soca	Uruguay	California Baptist Lancers	28:54.67	
17	Sam Lawler	United States	Syracuse Orange	28:55.14	
18	Will Anthony	New Zealand	Virginia Cavaliers	28:56.48	
19	Florian Lepallec	France	Butler Bulldogs	29:14.30	
20	Nikodem Dworczak	Poland	Eastern Kentucky Colonels	29:25.68	
21	Jack Jennings	United States	Tulane Green Wave	29:43.16	
22	Adisu Guadia	Israel	Oklahoma State Cowboys	29:57.66	
23	Skylar Stidam	United States	Indiana Hoosiers	30:23.47	
24	Dennis Kipruto	Kenya	Alabama Crimson Tide	DNF	

==== Men's 110-meter hurdles ====
Wind: +0.1 m/s

Placings in the men's 110-meter hurdles at the 2024 NCAA Division I Outdoor Track and Field Championships
Rank	Athlete	Nationality	Team	Time	Notes
1st place, gold medalist(s)	Darius Luff	United States	Nebraska Cornhuskers	13.19	PB
2nd place, silver medalist(s)	Ja'Kobe Tharp	United States	Auburn Tigers	13.20	
3rd place, bronze medalist(s)	Ja'Qualon Scott	United States	Texas A&M Aggies	13.27	PB
4	Malachi Snow	United States	San Jose State Spartans	13.33	PB
5	De'Vion Wilson	United States	Houston Cougars	13.36	
6	Samuel Bennett	United States	Howard Bison	13.45	PB
7	Jerome Campbell	Jamaica	Northern Colorado Bears	13.49	
8	Matthew Sophia	Netherlands	LSU Tigers	13.53	
9	Johnny Brackins	United States	USC Trojans	13.63	

==== Men's 400-meter hurdles ====
Placings in the men's 400-meter hurdles at the 2024 NCAA Division I Outdoor Track and Field Championships
Rank	Athlete	Nationality	Team	Time	Notes
1st place, gold medalist(s)	Caleb Dean	United States	Texas Tech Red Raiders	47.23	PB, CL
2nd place, silver medalist(s)	Chris Robinson	United States	Alabama Crimson Tide	47.98	
3rd place, bronze medalist(s)	Nathaniel Ezekiel	Nigeria	Baylor Bears	48.88	
4	Ja'Qualon Scott	United States	Texas A&M Aggies	49.08	PB
5	Oskar Edlund	Sweden	Texas Tech Red Raiders	49.23	
6	Corde Long	France	Alabama Crimson Tide	49.47	
7	Jakwan Hale	United States	Tennessee Volunteers	49.49	
8	Sean Burrell	United States	LSU Tigers	51.17	
	Clement Ducos	France	Tennessee Volunteers	DNF	

==== Men's 3000-meter steeplechase ====
Placings in the men's 3000-meter steeplechase at the 2024 NCAA Division I Outdoor Track and Field Championships
Rank	Athlete	Nationality	Team	Time	Notes
1st place, gold medalist(s)	Parker Stokes	United States	Georgetown Hoyas	8:24:58	
2nd place, silver medalist(s)	Nathan Mountain	United States	Virginia Cavaliers	8:25:71	SB
3rd place, bronze medalist(s)	Gable Sieperda	United States	Iowa State Cyclones	8:25:92	PB
4	Abdelhakim Abouzouhir	Morocco	Eastern Kentucky Colonels	8:27:09	
5	CJ Singleton	United States	Notre Dame Fighting Irish	8:27:46	PB
6	Estanis Ruiz	Spain	Portland Pilots	8:28:15	PB
7	Yasin Sado	United States	Virginia Cavaliers	8:28:17	
8	Alexander Korcynski	United States	Northeastern Huskies	8:29:42	PB
9	James Corrigan	United States	BYU Cougars	8:29:61	
10	Jackson Shorten	United States	Princeton Tigers	8:29:84	PB
11	Tom Seitzer	United States	Notre Dame Fighting Irish	8:35:70	
12	Levi Taylor	United States	Montana State Bobcats	8:43:47	

==== Men's 4 × 100-meter relay ====
Placings in the men's 4 × 100-meter relay at the 2024 NCAA Division I Outdoor Track and Field Championships
Rank	Team	Time	Notes
1st place, gold medalist(s)	Auburn Tigers	38.03	SB CL
2nd place, silver medalist(s)	LSU Tigers	38.21	
3rd place, bronze medalist(s)	Houston Cougars	38.25	SB
4	Florida Gators	38.34	SB
5	Texas Longhorns	38.99	
	Texas Tech Red Raiders	DNF	
	Arizona Wildcats	DQ	
	San Jose State Spartans	DQ	

==== Men's 4 × 400-meter relay ====
Placings in the men's 4 × 400-meter relay at the 2024 NCAA Division I Outdoor Track and Field Championships
Rank	Team	Time	Notes
1st place, gold medalist(s)	Texas A&M Aggies	2:58:37	SB CL
2nd place, silver medalist(s)	Arkansas Razorbacks	2:58:83	SB
3rd place, bronze medalist(s)	Florida Gators	2:58:98	SB
4	Arizona State Sun Devils	3:00:87	SB
5	Tennessee Volunteers	3:01:22	SB
6	Texas Longhorns	3:01:41	SB
7	LSU Tigers	3:01:57	
8	USC Trojans	3:02:68	

==== Men's long jump ====
Placings in the men's long jump at the 2024 NCAA Division I Outdoor Track and Field Championships
Rank	Athlete	Nationality	Team	1	2	3	4	5	6	Mark	Notes
1st place, gold medalist(s)	JC Stevenson	United States	USC Trojans	X	7.67	7.80	7.85	X	8.22	8.22 m (26 ft 11 1/2 in) (+0.8 m/s)	PB, CL
2nd place, silver medalist(s)	Jeremiah Davis	United States	Florida State Seminoles	8.06	8.07	X	7.94	7.88	7.93	8.07 m (26 ft 5 1/2 in) (−1.4 m/s)	SB
3rd place, bronze medalist(s)	Malcolm Clemons	United States	Florida Gators	7.44	7.87	8.05	7.80	7.94	X	8.05 m (26 ft 4 3/4 in) (+1.3 m/s)	SB
4	Johnny Brackins	United States	USC Trojans	8.03	7.95	7.82	5.72	7.54	7.60	8.03 m (26 ft 4 in) (+0.1 m/s)	
5	Wayne Pinnock	Jamaica	Arkansas Razorbacks	7.68	7.86	7.98	7.97	X	7.35	7.98 m (26 ft 2 in) (+0.9 m/s)	
6	Charles Godfred	Nigeria	Minnesota Golden Gophers	7.77	X	7.90	X	X	7.43	7.90 m (25 ft 11 in) (+1.9 m/s)	
7	Goodness Iredia	Nigeria	South Florida Bulls	7.86	X	X	7.67	X	7.81	7.86 m (25 ft 9 1/4 in) (+0.7 m/s)	
8	Nikaoli Williams	Jamaica	Oklahoma Sooners	X	7.62	7.27	7.61	7.53	7.76	7.76 m (25 ft 5 1/2 in) (+2.6 m/s)	
9	Anthony Riley	United States	Oklahoma Sooners	7.07	7.64	7.47	7.32	7.22	7.53	7.64 m (25 ft 3/4 in) (+1.7 m/s)	
10	Ramsey Hunt	United States	Eastern Illinois Panthers	X	7.60	7.51				7.60 m (24 ft 11 in) (+1.6 m/s)	
11	Sean Dixon-Bodie	United States	Florida Gators	7.43	7.60	7.37				7.60 m (24 ft 11 in) (+1.5 m/s)	
12	Kenson Tate	United States	Lamar Cardinals	7.28	7.56	7.56				7.56 m (24 ft 9 1/2 in) (+0.4 m/s)	
13	Channing Ferguson	United States	South Carolina Gamecocks	7.56	X	7.16				7.56 m (24 ft 9 1/2 in) (+0.9 m/s)	
14	Gabriel Binion	United States	UTSA Roadrunners	7.55	7.51	7.26				7.55 m (24 ft 9 in) (+1.0 m/s)	
15	Jake Burkey	Great Britain	Louisville Cardinals	7.53	7.37	7.48				7.53 m (24 ft 8 1/4 in) (+0.5 m/s)	
16	Jordan Turner	Jamaica	Florida State Seminoles	7.52	7.47	6.02				7.52 m (24 ft 8 in) (+0.4 m/s)	
17	James Brown	United States	Grambling State Tigers	7.24	7.45	X				7.45 m (24 ft 5 1/4 in) (+0.7 m/s)	
18	Ezra Mellinger	United States	Duke Blue Devils	7.43	X	7.08				7.43 m (24 ft 4 1/2 in) (+1.0 m/s)	
19	Prestin Artis	United States	Washington Huskies	7.36	7.23	7.34				7.36 m (24 ft 1 3/4 in) (+1.5 m/s)	
20	Sir Jonathan Sims	United States	Arizona Wildcats	7.36	7.20	X				7.36 m (24 ft 1 3/4 in) (+0.8 m/s)	
21	Curtis Williams	United States	Florida State Seminoles	X	X	7.33				7.33 m (24 ft 1/2 in) (+2.0 m/s)	
22	Tayton Klein	United States	Kansas Jayhawks	7.26	7.28	7.26				7.28 m (23 ft 10 1/2 in) (+1.8 m/s)	
23	Jake Wall	United States	Michigan Wolverines	7.02	7.09	X				7.09 m (23 ft 3 in) (+1.4 m/s)	
—	A'nan Bridgett	United States	Rutgers Scarlet Knights							DNS	

==== Men's triple jump ====
Placings in the men's triple jump at the 2024 NCAA Division I Outdoor Track and Field Championships
Rank	Athlete	Nationality	Team	Mark	Wind (m/s)	Notes
1st place, gold medalist(s)	Salif Mane	United States	Fairleigh Dickinson Knights	17.14 m (56 ft 2 3/4 in)	+1.7	PB CL
2nd place, silver medalist(s)	Russell Robinson	United States	Miami Hurricanes	17.13 m (56 ft 2 1/4 in)	+0.6	PB
3rd place, bronze medalist(s)	Brandon Green Jr.	United States	Oklahoma Sooners	16.63 m (54 ft 6 1/2 in)	+1.7	
4	Jeremiah Davis	United States	Florida State Seminoles	16.62 m (54 ft 6 1/4 in)	+0.4	
5	Luke Brown	Jamaica	Kentucky Wildcats	16.44 m (53 ft 11 in)	-0.5	
6	Praise Aniamaka	Canada	Purdue Boilermakers	16.30 m (53 ft 5 1/2 in)	+0.2	
7	Kyvon Tatham	United States	Florida State Seminoles	16.30 m (53 ft 5 1/2 in)	+0.7	PB
8	Sean Dixon-Bodie	United States	Florida Gators	16.28 m (53 ft 4 3/4 in)	+0.4	
9	Terrol Wilson	Jamaica	Nebraska Cornhuskers	16.21 m (53 ft 2 in)	+1.4	
10	Micaylon Moore	United States	Nebraska Cornhuskers	16.12 m (52 ft 10 1/2 in)	+1.1	
11	David Ajama	United States	Houston Cougars	16.06 m (52 ft 8 1/4 in)	+1.9	
12	Jemuel Miller	Barbados	UTSA Roadrunners	16.02 m (52 ft 6 1/2 in)	+0.1	
13	Viktor Morozov	Estonia	Illinois Fighting Illini	15.94 m (52 ft 3 1/2 in)	+1.1	PB
14	Sterling Scott	United States	Missouri Tigers	15.80 m (51 ft 10 in)	+0.2	PB
15	Malachi Aiken	United States	Maryland Eastern Shore Hawks	15.66 m (51 ft 4 1/2 in)	+1.1	
16	Chidozie Kalu	Nigeria	Virginia Tech Hokies	15.57 m (51 ft 3/4 in)	+1.2	
17	Safin Wills	Jamaica	Purdue Boilermakers	15.50 m (50 ft 10 in)	+0.7	
18	Iangelo Atkinstall-Daley	Jamaica	Ole Miss Rebels	15.44 m (50 ft 7 3/4 in)	+0.8	
19	Stacy Brown Jr.	United States	Texas Tech Red Raiders	15.38 m (50 ft 5 1/2 in)	-0.2	
20	Garison Breeding	United States	Texas Tech Red Raiders	15.28 m (50 ft 1 1/2 in)	+0.6	
21	Jeremy Nelson	United States	Louisiana Ragin' Cajuns	15.25 m (50 ft 1/4 in)	+0.4	
22	Gavin Champ	United States	USC Trojans	15.02 m (49 ft 3 1/4 in)	+0.9	
23	Sir Jonathan Sims	United States	Arizona Wildcats	14.97 m (49 ft 1 1/4 in)	+0.8	
	Kelsey Daniel	Trinidad and Tobago	Texas Longhorns	X		

==== Men's high jump ====
Placings in the men's high jump at the 2024 NCAA Division I Outdoor Track and Field Championships
Rank	Athlete	Nationality	Team	2.07	2.12	2.17	2.20	2.23	2.26	2.33	Mark	Notes
1st place, gold medalist(s)	Romaine Beckford	Jamaica	Arkansas Razorbacks	-	o	o	o	xo	xo	xxx	2.26 m (7 ft 4 3/4 in)	SB
2nd place, silver medalist(s)	Tyus Wilson	United States	Nebraska Cornhuskers	-	o	xo	xxo	o	xxx		2.23 m (7 ft 3 3/4 in)	
3rd place, bronze medalist(s)	Caleb Snowden	United States	Arkansas-Pine Bluff Golden Lions	-	o	o	o	xxo	xxx		2.23 m (7 ft 3 3/4 in)	
4	Tito Alofe	United States	Harvard Crimson	o	o	o	o	xxx			2.20 m (7 ft 2 1/2 in)	PB
5	Devin Loudermilk	United States	Kansas Jayhawks	-	xo	o	o	xxx			2.20 m (7 ft 2 1/2 in)	
6	Kyren Washington	United States	Oklahoma Sooners	o	o	o	xo	xxx			2.20 m (7 ft 2 1/2 in)	=PB
7	Riyon Rankin	United States	Georgia Bulldogs	o	o	o	xxx				2.17 m (7 ft 1 1/4 in)	
8	Brady Palen	United States	Wichita State Shockers	o	o	xo	xxx				2.17 m (7 ft 1 1/4 in)	
9	Omamuyovwi Erhire	Nigeria	Texas Tech Red Raiders	xo	o	xo	xxx				2.17 m (7 ft 1 1/4 in)	
10	Charles McBride II	United States	Campbell Fighting Camels	-	o	xxo	xxx				2.17 m (7 ft 1 1/4 in)	
11	Reign Winston	United States	Ohio State Buckeyes	o	o	xxx					2.12 m (6 ft 11 1/4 in)	
11	Channing Ferguson	United States	South Carolina Gamecocks	o	o	xxx					2.12 m (6 ft 11 1/4 in)	
11	Brandon Burke	United States	Virginia Tech Hokies	o	o	xxx					2.12 m (6 ft 11 1/4 in)	
11	Elias Gerald	United States	USC Trojans	o	o	xxx					2.12 m (6 ft 11 1/4 in)	
15	Kennedy Sauder	United States	Miami Hurricanes	xo	o	xxx					2.12 m (6 ft 11 1/4 in)	
15	Grant Campbell	United States	Tennessee Volunteers	xo	o	xxx					2.12 m (6 ft 11 1/4 in)	
17	Antrea Mita	Greece	Houston Cougars	o	xo	xxx					2.12 m (6 ft 11 1/4 in)	
17	Kamyren Garrett	United States	Illinois Fighting Illini	o	xo	xxx					2.12 m (6 ft 11 1/4 in)	
19	Kudakwashe Chadenga	Zimbabwe	LSU Tigers	xo	xo	xxx					2.12 m (6 ft 11 1/4 in)	
20	Elijah Bell	United States	Virginia Tech Hokies	o	xxo	xxx					2.12 m (6 ft 11 1/4 in)	
21	Joe Lynch	United States	South Dakota Coyotes	o	xxx						2.07 m (6 ft 9 1/4 in)	
22	Jakub Bělík	Czech Republic	UTEP Miners	xo	xxx						2.07 m (6 ft 9 1/4 in)	
23	Dorian Curry	United States	South Alabama Jaguars	xxo	xxx						2.07 m (6 ft 9 1/4 in)	
	Brion Stephens	United States	Louisville Cardinals	-	xxx						NH	

==== Men's pole vault ====
Placings in the men's pole vault at the 2024 NCAA Division I Outdoor Track and Field Championships
Rank	Athlete	Nationality	Team	5.07	5.22	5.37	5.52	5.62	5.67	5.72	5.82	Mark	Notes
1st place, gold medalist(s)	Keaton Daniel	United States	Kentucky Wildcats	-	-	o	o	o	o	x-	xx	5.67 m (18 ft 7 in)	=SB
2nd place, silver medalist(s)	Clayton Simms	United States	Kansas Jayhawks	-	o	o	o	xo	x-	xx		5.62 m (18 ft 5 1/4 in)	SB
3rd place, bronze medalist(s)	Christyan Sampy	United States	Houston Cougars	-	o	o	o	xxx				5.52 m (18 ft 1 1/4 in)	
3rd place, bronze medalist(s)	Simen Guttormsen	Norway	Duke Blue Devils	-	-	o	o	xxx				5.52 m (18 ft 1 1/4 in)	
5	Cody Johnston	United States	Illinois Fighting Illini	-	o	xo	o	xxx				5.52 m (18 ft 1 1/4 in)	
6	James Rhoads	United States	Penn Quakers	-	-	o	xo	xxx				5.52 m (18 ft 1 1/4 in)	
6	Skyler Magula	United States	California Golden Bears	-	-	o	xo	xxx				5.52 m (18 ft 1 1/4 in)	=SB
8	Max Manson	United States	Washington Huskies	o	o	o	xxx					5.37 m (17 ft 7 1/4 in)	
8	Conner McClure	United States	Virginia Tech Hokies	-	o	o	xxx					5.37 m (17 ft 7 1/4 in)	
8	Eerik Haamer	Estonia	South Dakota Coyotes	o	o	o	xxx					5.37 m (17 ft 7 1/4 in)	
8	Kyle Rademeyer	South Africa	South Alabama Jaguars	-	-	o	-	xxx				5.37 m (17 ft 7 1/4 in)	
8	Marshall Faurot	United States	South Dakota Coyotes	o	o	o	xxx					5.37 m (17 ft 7 1/4 in)	
13	Scott Toney	United States	Penn Quakers	-	xxo	o	xxx					5.37 m (17 ft 7 1/4 in)	
14	Randon Gray	United States	UT Arlington Mavericks	xo	xo	xo	xxx					5.37 m (17 ft 7 1/4 in)	PB
15	Walter Bannerman	United States	George Mason Patriots	xxo	xo	xxo	xxx					5.37 m (17 ft 7 1/4 in)	PB
16	Logan Hammer	United States	Utah State Aggies	-	o	xxx						5.22 m (17 ft 1 1/2 in)	
17	Dalton Shepler	United States	Kentucky Wildcats	xo	o	xxx						5.22 m (17 ft 1 1/2 in)	
17	Arnie Grunert	United States	Western Illinois Leathernecks	xo	o	xxx						5.22 m (17 ft 1 1/2 in)	
19	Nikolai van Huyssteen	South Africa	Georgia Bulldogs	o	xo	xxx						5.22 m (17 ft 1 1/2 in)	
20	Travis Snyder	United States	Connecticut Huskies	o	xxx							5.07 m (16 ft 7 1/2 in)	
20	Brian O'Sullivan	United States	Rutgers Scarlet Knights	o	xxx							5.07 m (16 ft 7 1/2 in)	
22	Sean Gribble	United States	Texas Tech Red Raiders	xo	xxx							5.07 m (16 ft 7 1/2 in)	
22	Tyler Carrel	United States	Indiana Hoosiers	xo	xxx							5.07 m (16 ft 7 1/2 in)	
	Jack Hodge	United States	Grand Canyon Antelopes	-	xxx							NH	

==== Men's shot put ====
Placings in the men's shot put at the 2024 NCAA Division I Outdoor Track and Field Championships
Rank	Athlete	Nationality	Team	1	2	3	4	5	6	Mark	Notes
1st place, gold medalist(s)	Tarik Robinson-O'Hagan	United States	Ole Miss Rebels	20.42	X	20.38	X	20.19	20.88	20.88 m (68 ft 6 in)	
2nd place, silver medalist(s)	Jason Swarens	United States	Wisconsin Badgers	19.57	20.38	X	X	19.84	19.12	20.38 m (66 ft 10 1/4 in)	SB
3rd place, bronze medalist(s)	Dylan Targgart	United States	South Carolina Gamecocks	19.87	X	20.19	19.67	20.23	19.90	20.23 m (66 ft 4 1/4 in)	
4	Danny Bryant	United States	BYU Cougars	18.02	18.06	19.65	X	X	20.02	20.02 m (65 ft 8 in)	PB
5	Courtney Lawrence	Jamaica	Clemson Tigers	19.11	19.48	19.92	18.49	18.92	X	19.92 m (65 ft 4 1/4 in)	PB
6	Alexander Kolesnikoff	Australia	Georgia Bulldogs	19.70	19.15	19.34	X	X	19.35	19.70 m (64 ft 7 1/2 in)	
7	Tyler Sudduth	United States	Illinois Fighting Illini	18.82	19.67	X	18.84	X	X	19.67 m (64 ft 6 1/4 in)	
8	Kevin Shubert	United States	Nebraska Cornhuskers	19.13	X	19.63	18.90	18.80	X	19.63 m (64 ft 4 3/4 in)	
9	John Meyer	United States	LSU Tigers	19.52	18.98	19.44	X	19.36	X	19.52 m (64 ft 1/2 in)	
10	Cam Jones	United States	Iowa State Cyclones	19.30	X	X				19.30 m (63 ft 3 3/4 in)	
11	Roury McCloyen	United States	Mississippi State Bulldogs	18.36	18.70	19.14				19.14 m (62 ft 9 1/2 in)	
12	Hayden Tobias	United States	Ohio State Buckeyes	19.05	X	X				19.05 m (62 ft 6 in)	
13	Jeff Duensing	United States	California Golden Bears	X	X	18.99				18.99 m (62 ft 3 1/2 in)	
14	Patrick Piperi	United States	Texas Longhorns	18.85	18.97	18.46				18.97 m (62 ft 2 3/4 in)	
15	Chris van Niekerk	South Africa	High Point Panthers	17.94	18.80	18.82				18.82 m (61 ft 8 3/4 in)	
16	Christopher Licata	United States	South Carolina Gamecocks	18.79	18.34	18.71				18.79 m (61 ft 7 3/4 in)	
17	Mariano Kis	Argentina	Colorado State Rams	18.49	17.67	18.77				18.77 m (61 ft 6 3/4 in)	
18	Trey Wilson	United States	Texas Tech Red Raiders	18.76	X	X				18.76 m (61 ft 6 1/2 in)	
19	Joshua Boamah	United States	Navy Midshipmen	18.09	18.33	17.71				18.33 m (60 ft 1 1/2 in)	
20	Diego Trevino	United States	Oklahoma Sooners	X	18.26	X				18.26 m (59 ft 10 3/4 in)	
21	Amiri Buchanan	United States	Illinois State Redbirds	15.91	17.35	17.93				17.93 m (58 ft 9 3/4 in)	
22	Matthew Rueff	United States	Auburn Tigers	X	17.72	X				17.72 m (58 ft 1 1/2 in)	
23	Brandon Lloyd	Jamaica	Arizona State Sun Devils	17.49	X	X				17.49 m (57 ft 4 1/2 in)	
	Michael Shoaf	United States	Notre Dame Fighting Irish	X	X	X				NM	

==== Men's discus throw ====
Placings in the men's discus throw at the 2024 NCAA Division I Outdoor Track and Field Championships
Rank	Athlete	Nationality	Team	1	2	3	4	5	6	Mark	Notes
1st place, gold medalist(s)	Francois Prinsloo	South Africa	South Alabama Jaguars	61.95	62.19	63.51	X	X	X	63.51 m (208 ft 4 1/4 in)	
2nd place, silver medalist(s)	Racquil Broderick	Jamaica	USC Trojans	57.11	59.03	55.35	56.96	61.77	60.81	61.77 m (202 ft 7 3/4 in)	
3rd place, bronze medalist(s)	Dimitrios Pavlidis	Greece	Kansas Jayhawks	59.06	58.15	58.29	60.97	59.06	59.86	60.97 m (200 ft 1/4 in)	
4	Mitchell Weber	United States	Missouri Tigers	56.07	60.85	60.23	59.11	60.32	59.34	60.85 m (199 ft 7 1/2 in)	SB
5	Kai Chang	Jamaica	Florida Gators	59.85	X	X	X	60.61	60.46	60.61 m (198 ft 10 in)	
6	Jacob Lemmon	United States	Virginia Cavaliers	59.25	60.43	54.72	58.03	59.88	59.86	60.43 m (198 ft 3 in)	
7	Milton Ingraham	United States	Miami Hurricanes	59.74	X	X	58.52	X	X	59.74 m (195 ft 11 3/4 in)	
8	Dallin Shurts	United States	BYU Cougars	X	56.96	58.70	X	X	59.04	59.04 m (193 ft 8 1/4 in)	
9	Michael Pinckney	United States	UCLA Bruins	X	55.57	58.98	58.40	X	X	58.98 m (193 ft 6 in)	PB
10	Devin Roberson	United States	Texas Tech Red Raiders	58.69	57.42	56.61				58.69 m (192 ft 6 1/2 in)	
11	Aron Alvarez Aranda	South Africa	Tennessee Volunteers	57.85	57.63	56.98				57.85 m (189 ft 9 1/2 in)	
12	Casey Helm	United States	Princeton Tigers	57.68	54.39	54.63				57.68 m (189 ft 2 3/4 in)	
13	Aidan Elbettar	United States	UCLA Bruins	X	X	57.67				57.67 m (189 ft 2 1/4 in)	
14	Zane Forist	United States	Michigan Wolverines	57.38	55.19	56.37				57.38 m (188 ft 3 in)	PB
15	Elias Foor	United States	Indiana State Sycamores	X	47.83	57.29				57.29 m (187 ft 11 1/2 in)	
16	Jordan Johnson	United States	Iowa Hawkeyes	56.51	X	56.74				56.74 m (186 ft 1 3/4 in)	
17	Andrew White	United States	Kansas State Wildcats	55.14	55.91	56.41				56.41 m (185 ft 3/4 in)	
18	Seth Allen	United States	Purdue Boilermakers	X	55.55	53.71				55.55 m (182 ft 3 in)	
19	Diamante Gumbs	British Virgin Islands	Northwestern State Demons	49.24	55.07	X				55.07 m (180 ft 8 in)	
20	Leo Neugebauer	Germany	Texas Longhorns	54.41	X	X				54.41 m (178 ft 6 in)	
21	Obiora Okeke	United States	Columbia Lions	47.30	51.07	51.15				51.15 m (167 ft 9 3/4 in)	
22	Roury McCloyen	United States	Mississippi State Bulldogs	50.29	X	50.90				50.90 m (166 ft 11 3/4 in)	
	Jeremiah Nubbe	Canada	Texas Longhorns	X	X	X				NM	
	Kevin Sakson	Estonia	Iowa State Cyclones	X	X	X				NM	

==== Men's javelin throw ====
Placings in the men's javelin throw at the 2024 NCAA Division I Outdoor Track and Field Championships
Rank	Athlete	Nationality	Team	1	2	3	4	5	6	Mark	Notes
1st place, gold medalist(s)	Marc Minichello	United States	Georgia Bulldogs	78.33	80.70	73.57	75.08	73.87	X	80.70 m (264 ft 9 in)	
2nd place, silver medalist(s)	Chandler Ault	United States	Washington Huskies	74.00	70.03	73.76	76.30	79.31	X	79.31 m (260 ft 2 1/4 in)	PB
3rd place, bronze medalist(s)	Devoux Deysel	South Africa	Miami Hurricanes	X	75.14	X	70.32	X	73.32	75.14 m (246 ft 6 1/4 in)	
4	Nnamdi Chinecherem	Jamaica	Baylor Bears	75.07	71.74	X	71.58	71.35	X	75.07 m (246 ft 3 1/2 in)	
5	Keyshawn Strachan	Bahamas	Auburn Tigers	74.95	X	70.91	73.13	X	73.54	74.95 m (245 ft 10 3/4 in)	
6	Rémi Rougetet	France	Mississippi State Bulldogs	73.04	68.95	73.44	74.23	72.69	72.34	74.23 m (243 ft 6 1/4 in)	
7	Mike Stein	United States	Iowa Hawkeyes	69.19	70.84	72.84	69.25	X	72.71	72.18 m (236 ft 9 1/2 in)	
8	Cameron Bates	United States	BYU Cougars	68.54	72.09	X	X	68.01	71.18	72.09 m (236 ft 6 in)	
9	Sam Hankins	United States	Texas A&M Aggies	70.38	66.26	71.77	X	X	X	71.77 m (235 ft 5 1/2 in)	
10	Leif Nelson	United States	USC Trojans	70.98	67.89	66.25				70.98 m (232 ft 10 1/4 in)	
11	Kevin Burr	United States	Tennessee Volunteers	X	70.61	X				70.61 m (231 ft 7 3/4 in)	
12	Tzuriel Pedigo	United States	LSU Tigers	70.40	69.29	X				70.40 m (230 ft 11 1/2 in)	SB
13	Will Lawrence	United States	LSU Tigers	63.28	64.50	70.20				70.20 m (230 ft 3 3/4 in)	
14	Ty Hampton	United States	Rice Owls	68.72	70.15	X				70.15 m (230 ft 1 3/4 in)	
15	Ethan Cocco	United States	Clemson Tigers	67.49	69.39	66.65				69.39 m (227 ft 7 3/4 in)	
16	Braden Presser	United States	Navy Midshipmen	X	69.15	X				69.15 m (226 ft 10 1/4 in)	
17	Abraham Sargent	United States	Florida Gators	67.48	X	68.97				68.97 m (226 ft 3 1/4 in)	
18	Franck DiSanza	Switzerland	Mississippi State Bulldogs	61.52	66.43	68.53				68.53 m (224 ft 10 in)	
19	Dash Sirmon	United States	Nebraska Cornhuskers	67.57	67.52	66.70				67.57 m (221 ft 8 in)	
20	Tyler Brown	United States	Nebraska Cornhuskers	X	66.50	X				66.50 m (218 ft 2 in)	
21	Ben Shughart	United States	Liberty Flames	62.23	65.97	X				65.97 m (216 ft 5 in)	
22	Evan Todd	United States	Montana Grizzlies	X	62.63	65.26				65.26 m (214 ft 1 1/4 in)	
23	Josh Trafny	United States	Weber State Wildcats	59.91	62.00	61.13				62.00 m (203 ft 4 3/4 in)	
	Matt Kraft	United States	North Dakota State Bison	X	X	X				NM	

==== Men's hammer throw ====
Placings in the men's hammer throw at the 2024 NCAA Division I Outdoor Track and Field Championships
Rank	Athlete	Nationality	Team	1	2	3	4	5	6	Mark	Notes
1st place, gold medalist(s)	Rowan Hamilton	Canada	California Golden Bears	69.90	76.00	77.18	76.25	X	76.23	77.18 m (253 ft 2 1/2 in)	PB
2nd place, silver medalist(s)	Kenneth Ikeji	Great Britain	Harvard Crimson	71.66	75.05	77.12	X	72.00	X	77.12 m (253 ft 0 in)	SB
3rd place, bronze medalist(s)	Angelos Mantzouranis	Greece	Minnesota Golden Gophers	72.10	X	72.09	X	75.50	73.40	75.50 m (247 ft 8 1/4 in)	
4	Israel Oloyede	United States	Grand Canyon Antelopes	70.20	72.72	75.20	73.30	73.32	75.29	75.29 m (247 ft 0 in)	PB
5	Nikolaos Polychroniou	Greece	USC Trojans	69.93	67.51	72.46	74.18	73.22	72.20	74.18 m (243 ft 4 1/4 in)	
6	Trey Knight	United States	Cal State Northridge Matadors	74.00	71.49	X	X	71.54	X	74.00 m (242 ft 9 1/4 in)	
7	Tarik Robinson-O'Hagan	United States	Ole Miss Rebels	X	72.81	71.13	70.82	68.41	70.59	72.81 m (238 ft 10 1/2 in)	PB
8	Parker Feuerborn	United States	Southeast Missouri State Redhawks	70.48	71.42	70.33	69.86	X	69.43	71.42 m (234 ft 3 3/4 in)	
9	Jeremiah Nubbe	United States	Texas Longhorns	67.52	70.06	68.76	69.00	71.17	67.27	71.17 m (233 ft 5 3/4 in)	
10	Anthony Barnes	New Zealand	Drake Bulldogs	68.59	68.2	70.04				70.04 m (229 ft 9 1/4 in)	
11	Bayley Campbell	Great Britain	Oklahoma Sooners	67.68	69.21	68.22				69.21 m (227 ft 3/4 in)	SB
12	Christian Johnson	United States	Duke Blue Devils	68.80	68.51	67.33				68.80 m (225 ft 8 1/2 in)	
13	Ivar Moisander	Sweden	California Golden Bears	68.13	67.94	67.31				68.13 m (223 ft 6 1/4 in)	
14	Aimar Palma Simo	Spain	Duke Blue Devils	67.67	67.99	X				67.99 m (223 ft 3/4 in)	
15	Sean Mockler	Ireland	Indiana Hoosiers	X	67.92	X				67.92 m (222 ft 10 in)	
16	Kris Emig	United States	UCLA Bruins	67.70	66.55	67.29				67.70 m (222 ft 1 1/4 in)	
17	RJ Decker	United States	Manhattan Jaspers	67.04	65.28	65.15				67.04 m (219 ft 11 1/4 in)	PB
18	John Hicks	United States	Liberty Flames	X	65.23	66.52				66.52 m (218 ft 2 3/4 in)	
19	Shaun Kerry	Great Britain	Rice Owls	64.26	66.37	X				66.37 m (217 ft 8 3/4 in)	
20	Jake Dalton	United States	Ole Miss Rebels	65.20	66.06	64.50				66.06 m (216 ft 8 3/4 in)	
21	John Fay	United States	Virginia Cavaliers	64.29	65.23	X				65.23 m (214 ft 0 in)	
22	Will Gross IV	United States	Florida Gators	X	64.68	58.44				64.68 m (212 ft 2 1/4 in)	
23	Joshua Boamah	United States	Navy Midshipmen	62.30	X	62.39				62.39 m (204 ft 8 1/4 in)	
	Brad Morell	United States	Cornell Big Red	X	X	X				NM	

==== Men's decathlon ====
Placings in the men's decathlon at the 2024 NCAA Division I Outdoor Track and Field Championships
Rank	Athlete	Nationality	Team	Overall points	100 m	LJ	SP	HJ	400 m	110 m H	DT	PV	JT	1500 m
1st place, gold medalist(s)	Leo Neugebauer	Germany	Texas	8961	942; 10.64	1025; 7.86 m (25 ft 9 1/4 in)	942; 17.46 m (57 ft 3 1/4 in)	868; 2.07 m (6 ft 9 1/4 in)	908; 48.03	929; 14.36	1032; 57.70 m (189 ft 3 1/2 in)	976; 5.21 m (17 ft 1 in)	687; 56.64 m (185 ft 9 3/4 in)	652; 4:44.61
2nd place, silver medalist(s)	Peyton Bair	United States	Mississippi State	8131	1023; 10.30	842; 7.12 m (23 ft 4 1/4 in)	811; 15.34 m (50 ft 3 3/4 in)	813; 2.01 m (6 ft 7 in)	939; 47.38	964; 14.08	593; 36.47 m (119 ft 7 3/4 in)	822; 4.71 m (15 ft 5 1/4 in)	651; 54.22 m (177 ft 10 1/2 in)	673; 4:41.15
3rd place, bronze medalist(s)	Edgar Campre	Portugal	Miami	8042	961; 10.56	871; 7.24 m (23 ft 9 in)	811; 15.34 m (50 ft 3 3/4 in)	705; 1.89 m (6 ft 2 1/4 in)	901; 48.16	981; 13.95	759; 44.62 m (146 ft 4 1/2 in)	822; 4.71 m (15 ft 5 1/4 in)	571; 48.78 m (160 ft 1/4 in)	660; 4:43.20
4	Jack Turner	Great Britain	Arkansas	7963	000; 00.00	000; 0.00 m (0 in)	000; 00.00 m (0 in)	000; 0.00 m (0 in)	000; 00.00	000; 00.00	000; 00.00 m (0 in)	000; 0.00 m (0 in)	000; 00.00 m (0 in)	000; 0:00.00
5	Lucas Van Klaveren	Netherlands	UT Arlington	7927	000; 00.00	000; 0.00 m (0 in)	000; 00.00 m (0 in)	000; 0.00 m (0 in)	000; 00.00	000; 00.00	000; 00.00 m (0 in)	000; 0.00 m (0 in)	000; 00.00 m (0 in)	000; 0:00.00
6	Rafael Raap	Netherlands	Oregon	7842	000; 00.00	000; 0.00 m (0 in)	000; 00.00 m (0 in)	000; 0.00 m (0 in)	000; 00.00	000; 00.00	000; 00.00 m (0 in)	000; 0.00 m (0 in)	000; 00.00 m (0 in)	000; 0:00.00
7	Lee Walburn	United States	Washington State	7816	000; 00.00	000; 0.00 m (0 in)	000; 00.00 m (0 in)	000; 0.00 m (0 in)	000; 00.00	000; 00.00	000; 00.00 m (0 in)	000; 0.00 m (0 in)	000; 00.00 m (0 in)	000; 0:00.00
8	Yariel Soto Torrado	Puerto Rico	Arkansas	7804	000; 00.00	000; 0.00 m (0 in)	000; 00.00 m (0 in)	000; 0.00 m (0 in)	000; 00.00	000; 00.00	000; 00.00 m (0 in)	000; 0.00 m (0 in)	000; 00.00 m (0 in)	000; 0:00.00
9	Ryan Talbot	United States	Michigan State	7759	000; 00.00	000; 0.00 m (0 in)	000; 00.00 m (0 in)	000; 0.00 m (0 in)	000; 00.00	000; 00.00	000; 00.00 m (0 in)	000; 0.00 m (0 in)	000; 00.00 m (0 in)	000; 0:00.00
10	Jami Schlueter	Great Britain	Washington	7739	000; 00.00	000; 0.00 m (0 in)	000; 00.00 m (0 in)	000; 0.00 m (0 in)	000; 00.00	000; 00.00	000; 00.00 m (0 in)	000; 0.00 m (0 in)	000; 00.00 m (0 in)	000; 0:00.00
11	Aiden Ouimet	United States	Illinois	7673	000; 00.00	000; 0.00 m (0 in)	000; 00.00 m (0 in)	000; 0.00 m (0 in)	000; 00.00	000; 00.00	000; 00.00 m (0 in)	000; 0.00 m (0 in)	000; 00.00 m (0 in)	000; 0:00.00
12	Josh Farmer	United States	UC Irvine	7647	000; 00.00	000; 0.00 m (0 in)	000; 00.00 m (0 in)	000; 0.00 m (0 in)	000; 00.00	000; 00.00	000; 00.00 m (0 in)	000; 0.00 m (0 in)	000; 00.00 m (0 in)	000; 0:00.00
13	Diarmuid O'Connor	Ireland	UConn	7546	000; 00.00	000; 0.00 m (0 in)	000; 00.00 m (0 in)	000; 0.00 m (0 in)	000; 00.00	000; 00.00	000; 00.00 m (0 in)	000; 0.00 m (0 in)	000; 00.00 m (0 in)	000; 0:00.00
14	Tayton Klein	United States	Kansas	7530	000; 00.00	000; 0.00 m (0 in)	000; 00.00 m (0 in)	000; 0.00 m (0 in)	000; 00.00	000; 00.00	000; 00.00 m (0 in)	000; 0.00 m (0 in)	000; 00.00 m (0 in)	000; 0:00.00
15	Dominique Hall	United States	Cincinnati	7464	000; 00.00	000; 0.00 m (0 in)	000; 00.00 m (0 in)	000; 0.00 m (0 in)	000; 00.00	000; 00.00	000; 00.00 m (0 in)	000; 0.00 m (0 in)	000; 00.00 m (0 in)	000; 0:00.00
16	Michael May	United States	Auburn	7375	000; 00.00	000; 0.00 m (0 in)	000; 00.00 m (0 in)	000; 0.00 m (0 in)	000; 00.00	000; 00.00	000; 00.00 m (0 in)	000; 0.00 m (0 in)	000; 00.00 m (0 in)	000; 0:00.00
17	Scott Boon	Netherlands	Houston Christian	7280	000; 00.00	000; 0.00 m (0 in)	000; 00.00 m (0 in)	000; 0.00 m (0 in)	000; 00.00	000; 00.00	000; 00.00 m (0 in)	000; 0.00 m (0 in)	000; 00.00 m (0 in)	000; 0:00.00
18	Isaiah Hudgens	United States	Incarnate Word	7265	000; 00.00	000; 0.00 m (0 in)	000; 00.00 m (0 in)	000; 0.00 m (0 in)	000; 00.00	000; 00.00	000; 00.00 m (0 in)	000; 0.00 m (0 in)	000; 00.00 m (0 in)	000; 0:00.00
19	Kyle Sieracki	United States	Incarnate Word	7230	000; 00.00	000; 0.00 m (0 in)	000; 00.00 m (0 in)	000; 0.00 m (0 in)	000; 00.00	000; 00.00	000; 00.00 m (0 in)	000; 0.00 m (0 in)	000; 00.00 m (0 in)	000; 0:00.00
20	Joel McFarlane	Scotland	TCU	7216	000; 00.00	000; 0.00 m (0 in)	000; 00.00 m (0 in)	000; 0.00 m (0 in)	000; 00.00	000; 00.00	000; 00.00 m (0 in)	000; 0.00 m (0 in)	000; 00.00 m (0 in)	000; 0:00.00
21	Sean Murphy	United States	Virginia Tech	7198	000; 00.00	000; 0.00 m (0 in)	000; 00.00 m (0 in)	000; 0.00 m (0 in)	000; 00.00	000; 00.00	000; 00.00 m (0 in)	000; 0.00 m (0 in)	000; 00.00 m (0 in)	000; 0:00.00
22	Casey Tow	United States	Grand Canyon	7182	000; 00.00	000; 0.00 m (0 in)	000; 00.00 m (0 in)	000; 0.00 m (0 in)	000; 00.00	000; 00.00	000; 00.00 m (0 in)	000; 0.00 m (0 in)	000; 00.00 m (0 in)	000; 0:00.00
23	Alexander Jung	Germany	Kansas	6891	000; 00.00	000; 0.00 m (0 in)	000; 00.00 m (0 in)	000; 0.00 m (0 in)	000; 00.00	000; 00.00	000; 00.00 m (0 in)	000; 0.00 m (0 in)	000; 00.00 m (0 in)	0 DNF
—	Austin West	United States	Iowa	DNF	000; 00.00	000; 0.00 m (0 in)	000; 00.00 m (0 in)	000; 0.00 m (0 in)	000; 00.00	0 DNS	0 DNS	0 DNS	0 DNS	0 DNS

=== Women ===
==== Women's 100 meters ====
Wind: +2.2 m/s

Placings in the women's 100 meters at the 2024 NCAA Division I Outdoor Track and Field Championships
Rank	Athlete	Nationality	Team	Time	Notes
1st place, gold medalist(s)	McKenzie Long	United States	Ole Miss Rebels	10.82	
2nd place, silver medalist(s)	Brianna Lyston	Jamaica	LSU Tigers	10.89	
3rd place, bronze medalist(s)	Rosemary Chukwuma	Nigeria	Texas Tech Red Raiders	10.90	
4	Jadyn Mays	United States	Oregon Ducks	10.95	
5	Kaila Jackson	United States	Georgia Bulldogs	11.00	
6	Thelma Davies	United States	LSU Tigers	11.04	
7	Leah Bertrand	Trinidad and Tobago	Ohio State Buckeyes	11.05	
8	Tima Godbless	Nigeria	LSU Tigers	11.10	

==== Women's 200 meters ====
Wind: +1.0 m/s

Placings in the women's 200 meters at the 2024 NCAA Division I Outdoor Track and Field Championships
Rank	Athlete	Nationality	Team	Time	Notes
1st place, gold medalist(s)	McKenzie Long	United States	Ole Miss Rebels	21.83	PB CL
2nd place, silver medalist(s)	JaMeesia Ford	United States	South Carolina Gamecocks	22.08	PB
3rd place, bronze medalist(s)	Jadyn Mays	United States	Oregon Ducks	22.19	PB
4	Jayla Jamison	United States	South Carolina Gamecocks	22.26	PB
5	Jassani Carter	United States	USC Trojans	22.66	
6	Kaila Jackson	United States	Georgia Bulldogs	22.68	
7	Dajaz Defrand	United States	Florida State Seminoles	22.72	
8	Tima Godbless	Nigeria	LSU Tigers	22.87	

==== Women's 400 meters ====
Placings in the women's 400 meters at the 2024 NCAA Division I Outdoor Track and Field Championships
Rank	Athlete	Nationality	Team	Time	Notes
1st place, gold medalist(s)	Nickisha Pryce	Jamaica	Arkansas Razorbacks	48.89	PB CR
2nd place, silver medalist(s)	Kaylyn Brown	United States	Arkansas Razorbacks	49.13	PB
3rd place, bronze medalist(s)	Amber Anning	Great Britain	Arkansas Razorbacks	49.59	
4	Rosey Effiong	United States	Arkansas Razorbacks	49.72	PB
5	Isabella Whittaker	United States	Penn Quakers	50.17	PB
6	Ella Onojuvwevwo	Nigeria	LSU Tigers	50.72	
7	Jan'Taijah Jones	United States	USC Trojans	50.77	
8	Brianna White	United States	Tennessee Volunteers	50.79	

==== Women's 800 meters ====
Placings in the women's 800 meters at the 2024 NCAA Division I Outdoor Track and Field Championships
Rank	Athlete	Nationality	Team	Time	Notes
1st place, gold medalist(s)	Juliette Whittaker	United States	Stanford Cardinal	1:59.61	PB
2nd place, silver medalist(s)	Roisin Willis	United States	Stanford Cardinal	2:00.17	PB
3rd place, bronze medalist(s)	Gabija Galvydytė	Lithuania	Oklahoma State Cowgirls	2:00.23	
4	Michaela Rose	United States	LSU Tigers	2:01.03	
5	Hayley Kitching	United States Australia	Penn State Nittany Lions	2:01.05	PB
6	Sanu Jallow	United States	Arkansas Razorbacks	2:01.07	
7	Aniya Mosley	United States	Ohio State Buckeyes	2:01.23	
8	Lauren Tolbert	United States	Duke Blue Devils	2:01.95	

==== Women's 1500 meters ====
Placings in the women's 1500 meters at the 2024 NCAA Division I Outdoor Track and Field Championships
Rank	Athlete	Nationality	Team	Time	Notes
1st place, gold medalist(s)	Maia Ramsden	New Zealand	Harvard Crimson	4:06.62	
2nd place, silver medalist(s)	Kimberley May	New Zealand	Providence Friars	4:08.07	
3rd place, bronze medalist(s)	Klaudia Kazimierska	Poland	Oregon Ducks	4:08.22	
4	Melissa Riggins	United States	Georgetown Hoyas	4:08.74	
5	Flomena Asekol	Kenya	Florida Gators	4:08.91	
6	Shannon Flockhart	Great Britain	Providence Friars	4:09.53	
7	Lindsey Butler	United States	Virginia Tech Hokies	4:09.85	
8	Olivia Howell	United States	Texas Longhorns	4:10.05	
9	Maggi Congdon	United States	Northern Arizona Lumberjacks	4:10.41	
10	Samantha Bush	United States	NC State Wolfpack	4:10.81	
11	Teagan Schein-Becker	United States	Rider Broncs	4:12.48	
12	Sophie O'Sullivan	Ireland	Washington Huskies	4:13.39	

==== Women's 5000 meters ====
Placings in the women's 5000 meters at the 2024 NCAA Division I Outdoor Track and Field Championships
Rank	Athlete	Nationality	Team	Time	Notes
1st place, gold medalist(s)	Parker Valby	United States	Florida Gators	14:52.18	PB CR
2nd place, silver medalist(s)	Hilda Olemomoi	Kenya	Alabama Crimson Tide	15:10.04	
3rd place, bronze medalist(s)	Bailey Hertenstein	United States	Colorado Buffaloes	15:10.98	PB
4	Margot Appleton	United States	Virginia Cavaliers	15:24.24	
5	Juliet Cherubet	Kenya	Texas Tech Red Raiders	15:25.41	PB
6	Taylor Roe	United States	Oklahoma State Cowgirls	15:26.18	SB
7	Ella Baran	United States	Colorado Buffaloes	15:28.43	PB
8	Sadie Sargent	United States	BYU Cougars	15:30.63	PB
9	Annika Reiss	United States	Northern Arizona Lumberjacks	15:30.64	PB
10	Gracelyn Larkin	Canada	Northern Arizona Lumberjacks	15:32.82	PB
11	Sophia Kennedy	United States	Stanford Cardinal	15:33.29	PB
12	Chloe Thomas	Canada	Connecticut Huskies	15:34.48	PB
13	Sydney Thorvaldson	United States	Arkansas Razorbacks	15:38.52	
14	Grace Hartman	United States	NC State Wolfpack	15:46.62	
15	Siona Chisholm	Canada	Notre Dame Fighting Irish	15:47.71	
16	Şilan Ayyıldız	Turkey	Oregon Ducks	15:47.85	
17	Amy Bunnage	Australia	Stanford Cardinal	16:00.04	
18	Flomena Asekol	Kenya	Florida Gators	16:03.51	
19	Phoebe Anderson	Great Britain	Columbia Lions	16:04.28	
20	Samantha Bush	United States	NC State Wolfpack	16:04.61	
21	Maelle Porcher	France	Iowa State Cyclones	16:07.38	
22	Chloe Scrimgeour	United States	Georgetown Hoyas	DNF	
23	Maia Ramsden	New Zealand	Harvard Crimson	DNS	
24	Lily Murphy	Great Britain	Penn Quakers	DNS	

==== Women's 10000 meters ====
Placings in the women's 10000 meters at the 2024 NCAA Division I Outdoor Track and Field Championships
Rank	Athlete	Nationality	Team	Time	Notes
1st place, gold medalist(s)	Parker Valby	United States	Florida Gators	31:46.09	MR
2nd place, silver medalist(s)	Hilda Olemonoi	Kenya	Alabama Crimson Tide	31:51.89	PB
3rd place, bronze medalist(s)	Taylor Roe	United States	Oklahoma State Cowgirls	32:17.45	PB
4	Molly Born	United States	Oklahoma State Cowgirls	32:27.18	PB
5	Chloe Scrimgeour	United States	Georgetown Hoyas	32:29.44	PB
6	Jenna Hutchins	United States	BYU Cougars	32:44.05	PB
7	Sydney Thorvaldson	United States	Arkansas Razorbacks	32:50.47	
8	Grace Hartman	United States	NC State Wolfpack	32:54.98	
9	Paityn Noe	United States	Arkansas Razorbacks	32:57.29	PB
10	Maggie Donahue	United States	Georgetown Hoyas	33:13.13	
11	Dani Barrett	Denmark	UC Davis Aggies	33:15.10	PB
12	Sadie Sigfstead	Canada	Villanova Wildcats	33:18.63	
13	Gabby Hentemann	United States	Oklahoma State Cowgirls	33:26.53	
14	Florence Caron	Canada	Penn State Nittany Lions	33:26.98	
15	Rosina Machu	United States	Gonzaga Bulldogs	34:07.11	
16	Sarah Carter	United States	Colorado State Rams	34:08.75	
17	Lucy Ndungu	United States	Wichita State Shockers	34:18.02	
18	Sandra Maiyo	Kenya	UTEP Miners	34:26.73	
19	Purity Sanga	Kenya	Middle Tennessee Blue Raiders	34:31.63	
20	Savannah Roark	United States	Syracuse Orange	34:43.18	
21	Ali Upshaw	United States	Northern Arizona Lumberjacks	34:55.74	
22	Lily Murphy	United States	Penn Quakers	DNF	
23	Amaris Tyynismaa	United States	NC State Wolfpack	DNF	
24	Andrea Markezich	United States	Notre Dame Fighting Irish	DNF	

==== Women's 100-meter hurdles ====
Wind: -0.0 m/s

Placings in the women's 100-meter hurdles at the 2024 NCAA Division I Outdoor Track and Field Championships
Rank	Athlete	Nationality	Team	Time	Notes
1st place, gold medalist(s)	Grace Stark	United States	Florida Gators	12.47	PB CL
2nd place, silver medalist(s)	Maribel Caicedo	Ecuador	Washington State Cougars	12.56	
3rd place, bronze medalist(s)	Rayniah Jones	United States	UCF Knights	12.59	PB
4	Jasmine Jones	United States	USC Trojans	12.64	PB
5	Destiny Huven	United States	Arkansas Razorbacks	12.85	
6	Aasia Laurencin	United States	Michigan Wolverines	12.86	
7	Micaela De Mello	Brazil	Washington State Cougars	12.92	
8	Jalaysiya Smith	United States	USC Trojans	12.96	

==== Women's 400-meter hurdles ====
Placings in the women's 400-meter hurdles at the 2024 NCAA Division I Outdoor Track and Field Championships
Rank	Athlete	Nationality	Team	Time	Notes
1st place, gold medalist(s)	Jasmine Jones	United States	USC Trojans	53.15	PB CL MR
2nd place, silver medalist(s)	Savannah Sutherland	Canada	Michigan Wolverines	53.26	PB
3rd place, bronze medalist(s)	Rachel Glenn	United States	Arkansas Razorbacks	54.11	
4	Akala Garrett	United States	Texas Longhorns	54.84	
5	Sydni Townsend	United States	Houston Cougars	55.01	
6	Shana Grebo	France	Oregon Ducks	55.30	PB
7	Gabrielle Matthews	Jamaica	Ole Miss Rebels	55.33	
8	Abbey Glynn	United States	Colorado Buffaloes	55.75	

==== Women's 3000-meter steeplechase ====
Placings in the women's 3000-meter steeplechase at the 2024 NCAA Division I Outdoor Track and Field Championships
Rank	Athlete	Nationality	Team	Time	Notes
1st place, gold medalist(s)	Doris Lemngole	Kenya	Alabama Crimson Tide	9:15.24	PB CR
2nd place, silver medalist(s)	Olivia Markezich	United States	Notre Dame Fighting Irish	9:17.36	PB
3rd place, bronze medalist(s)	Janette Schraft	United States	Iowa State Cyclones	9:34.82	PB
4	Greta Karinauskaitė	Lithuania	California Baptist Lancers	9:35.56	
5	Laura Taborda	Portugal	Arkansas Razorbacks	9:35.67	
6	Elise Thorner	Great Britain	Florida Gators	9:37.30	
7	Sophie Novak	United States	Notre Dame Fighting Irish	9:40.54	PB
8	Karrie Baloga	United States	Northern Arizona Lumberjacks	9:42.22	PB
9	Taylor Lovell	United States	BYU Cougars	9:48.39	PB
10	Calli Doan	United States	Liberty Flames	9:49.54	PB
11	Emma Tavella	United States	Boston College Eagles	9:55.89	
12	Zoie Dundon	United States	Minnesota Golden Gophers	10:00.55	

==== Women's 4 × 100-meter relay ====
Placings in the women's 4 × 100-meter relay at the 2024 NCAA Division I Outdoor Track and Field Championships
Rank	Team	Time	Notes
1st place, gold medalist(s)	Ole Miss Rebels	42.34	
2nd place, silver medalist(s)	LSU Tigers	42.57	
3rd place, bronze medalist(s)	South Carolina Gamecocks	42.63	
4	Arkansas Razorbacks	42.71	
5	Texas Tech Red Raiders	42.87	
6	Baylor Bears	42.98	
7	Texas Longhorns	43.06	
8	Oregon Ducks	43.11	

==== Women's 4 × 400-meter relay ====
Placings in the women's 4 × 400-meter relay at the 2024 NCAA Division I Outdoor Track and Field Championships
Rank	Team	Time	Notes
1st place, gold medalist(s)	Arkansas	3:17.96	SB CR
2nd place, silver medalist(s)	Tennessee	3:23.32	SB
3rd place, bronze medalist(s)	Texas	3:23.68	SB
4	Georgia	3:24.26	SB
5	Houston	3:24.73	SB
6	South Carolina	3:24.86	SB
7	Oregon	00.00	SB
8	Texas A&M	3:25.89	SB

==== Women's long jump ====
Placings in the women's long jump at the 2024 NCAA Division I Outdoor Track and Field Championships
Rank	Athlete	Nationality	Team	Mark	Wind (m/s)	Notes
1st place, gold medalist(s)	Ackelia Smith	Jamaica	Texas Longhorns	6.79 m (22 ft 3 1/4 in)	+0.4	
2nd place, silver medalist(s)	Claire Bryant	United States	Florida Gators	6.74 m (22 ft 1 1/4 in)	+0.6	SB
3rd place, bronze medalist(s)	Alyssa Jones	United States	Stanford Cardinal	6.64 m (21 ft 9 1/4 in)	+1.2	
4	Anthaya Charlton	Bahamas	Florida Gators	6.59 m (21 ft 7 1/4 in)	+0.8	
5	Alexis Brown	United States	Baylor Bears	6.51 m (21 ft 4 1/4 in)	+0.6	
6	Funminiyi Olajide	Great Britain	SMU Mustangs	6.48 m (21 ft 3 in)	+1.7	
7	Velecia Williams	Jamaica	Nebraska Cornhuskers	6.41 m (21 ft 1/4 in)	+0.9	
8	Ida Breigan	Norway	UTSA Roadrunners	6.40 m (20 ft 11 3/4 in)	+0.1	
9	Robbie Grace	United States	Wake Forest Demon Deacons	6.31 m (20 ft 8 1/4 in)	+2.1	
10	Emilia Sjöstrand	Sweden	San Jose State Spartans	6.29 m (20 ft 7 1/2 in)	+1.4	
11	Ameia Wilson	United States	Georgia Tech Yellow Jackets	6.28 m (20 ft 7 in)	+0.1	
12	Nia Robinson	Jamaica	Arkansas Razorbacks	6.27 m (20 ft 6 3/4 in)	+0.5	
13	Aaliyah Foster	Jamaica	Texas Longhorns	6.25 m (20 ft 6 in)	+0.4	PB
14	Morgan Smalls	United States	LSU Tigers	6.24 m (20 ft 5 1/2 in)	+0.3	
15	Asherah Collins	United States	UCF Knights	6.23 m (20 ft 5 1/4 in)	+0.07	
16	Lena Gooden	United States	Vanderbilt Commodores	6.22 m (20 ft 4 3/4 in)	+0.7	PB
17	Jasmine Akins	United States	Oklahoma Sooners	6.20 m (20 ft 4 in)	+2.1	
18	Sydney Willits	United States	Iowa State Cyclones	6.17 m (20 ft 2 3/4 in)	+0.6	
19	A'liyah Thomas	United States	UConn Huskies	6.16 m (20 ft 2 1/2 in)	+1.6	
20	Ilse Steigenga	Netherlands	Pitt Panthers	6.12 m (20 ft 3/4 in)	+2.1	
21	Celine Brown	United States	Rutgers Scarlet Knights	6.01 m (19 ft 8 1/2 in)	+0.6	
22	Alexandria Johnson	United States	Arizona State Sun Devils	5.89 m (19 ft 3 3/4 in)	+2.0	
23	Kendall Johnson	United States	Dayton Flyers	5.82 m (19 ft 1 in)	+1.9	
	Alexandria Kelly	United States	Princeton Tigers	NM		

==== Women's triple jump ====
Placings in the women's triple jump at the 2024 NCAA Division I Outdoor Track and Field Championships
Rank	Athlete	Nationality	Team	Mark	Wind (m/s)	Notes
1st place, gold medalist(s)	Ackelia Smith	Jamaica	Texas Longhorns	14.52 m (47 ft 7 1/2 in)	+0.9	SB
2nd place, silver medalist(s)	Darja Sopova	Latvia	Illinois Fighting Illini	14.01 m (45 ft 11 1/2 in)	+1.3	PB
3rd place, bronze medalist(s)	Emilia Sjöstrand	Sweden	San Jose State Spartans	13.87 m (45 ft 6 in)	+0.5	
4	Anne-Suzanna Fosther-Katta	Cameroon	Texas Tech Red Raiders	13.68 m (44 ft 10 1/2 in)	+1.4	
5	Mikeisha Welcome	Canada	Georgia Bulldogs	13.65 m (44 ft 9 1/4 in)	+1.0	SB
6	Temi Ojora	Nigeria	USC Trojans	13.51 m (44 ft 3 3/4 in)	+1.4	
7	Eunice Ilunga Mbuyi	France	Louisiana–Monroe Warhawks	13.50 m (44 ft 3 1/4 in)	+1.8	SB
8	Rūta Kate Lasmane	Latvia	Texas Tech Red Raiders	13.50 m (44 ft 3 1/4 in)	+1.8	
9	Shantae Foreman	Jamaica	Clemson Tigers	13.30 m (43 ft 7 1/2 in)	+0.4	
10	Ashley McElmurry	United States	Nebraska Cornhuskers	13.23 m (43 ft 4 3/4 in)	+0.9	
11	Diarra Sow	Great Britain	Minnesota Golden Gophers	13.19 m (43 ft 3 1/4 in)	+0.4	
12	Winny Bii	Kenya	Oklahoma State Cowgirls	13.11 m (43 ft 0 in)	+2.5	
13	Asherah Collins	United States	UCF Knights	13.07 m (42 ft 10 1/2 in)	+0.8	
14	Rhianna Phipps	Jamaica	Nebraska Cornhuskers	13.01 m (42 ft 8 in)	+1.1	
15	Morgan Smalls	United States	LSU Tigers	12.96 m (42 ft 6 in)	+0.5	
16	Christina Warren	United States	Miami Hurricanes	12.96 m (42 ft 6 in)	+0.4	
17	Taylor Fingers	United States	LSU Tigers	12.93 m (42 ft 5 in)	+1.6	
18	Riley Ammenhauser	United States	Michigan Wolverines	12.90 m (42 ft 3 3/4 in)	+1.3	
19	Esther Solarin	Nigeria	Youngstown State Penguins	12.88 m (42 ft 3 in)	+0.2	
20	Georgina Scoot	Great Britain	Princeton Tigers	12.76 m (41 ft 10 1/4 in)	+0.6	
21	Xiamara Young	United States	San Diego State Aztecs	12.70 m (41 ft 8 in)	+1.4	
22	Jada Joseph	United States	Brown Bears	12.53 m (41 ft 1 1/4 in)	+1.3	
23	Grace Oshiokpu	Nigeria	Texas Tech Red Raiders	12.26 m (40 ft 2 1/2 in)	+0.1	
24	Makenzy Mizera	United States	Liberty Flames	12.18 m (39 ft 11 1/2 in)	-0.4	

==== Women's high jump ====
Placings in the women's high jump at the 2024 NCAA Division I Outdoor Track and Field Championships
Rank	Athlete	Nationality	Team	1.72	1.77	1.82	1.87	1.91	1.94	1.97	2.00	Mark	Notes
1st place, gold medalist(s)	Rose Amoanimaa Yeboah	Ghana	Illinois Fighting Illini	–	–	o	xo	o	xxo	xxo	xxx	1.97 m (6 ft 5 1/2 in)	PB, MR
1st place, gold medalist(s)	Elena Kulichenko	Cyprus	Georgia Bulldogs	–	o	xo	o	xxo	o	xxo	xxx	1.97 m (6 ft 5 1/2 in)	PB, MR
3rd place, bronze medalist(s)	Temitope Adeshina	Nigeria	Texas Tech Red Raiders	–	o	o	o	xxo	xxo	xxo	xxx	1.97 m (6 ft 5 1/2 in)	PB
4	Lamara Distin	Jamaica	Texas A&M Aggies	–	–	o	o	xo	xxx			1.91 m (6 ft 3 in)	
T5	Jenna Rogers	United States	Nebraska Cornhuskers	–	o	o	xo	xxx				1.87 m (6 ft 1 1/2 in)	PB
T5	Roschell Clayton	Jamaica	Villanova Wildcats	–	o	o	xo	xxx				1.87 m (6 ft 1 1/2 in)	PB
T7	Cierra Allphin	United States	BYU Cougars	–	o	xo	xxo	xxx				1.87 m (6 ft 1 1/2 in)	SB
T7	Cheyla Scott	United States	Oregon Ducks	–	xo	o	xxo	xxx				1.87 m (6 ft 1 1/2 in)	
T9	Alice Taylor	New Zealand	Rice Owls	o	xo	xo	xxo	xxx				1.87 m (6 ft 1 1/2 in)	
T9	Bara Sajdokova	Czech Republic	Illinois Fighting Illini	–	o	xxo	xxo	xxx				1.87 m (6 ft 1 1/2 in)	
11	Morgan Smalls	United States	LSU Tigers	o	o	xo	xxx					1.82 m (5 ft 11 1/2 in)	
12	Charity Hufnagel	United States	Kentucky Wildcats	–	xo	xo	xxx					1.82 m (5 ft 11 1/2 in)	
T13	Rachel Glenn	United States	Arkansas Razorbacks	–	o	xxo	xxx					1.82 m (5 ft 11 1/2 in)	
T13	Claire Lowrey	United States	Texas Tech Red Raiders	o	o	xxo	xxx					1.82 m (5 ft 11 1/2 in)	
T15	Amelia Benjamin	United States	Albany Great Danes	o	o	xxx						1.77 m (5 ft 9 1/2 in)	
T15	Destiny Masters	United States	Wichita State Shockers	o	o	xxx						1.77 m (5 ft 9 1/2 in)	
17	E. Grace Quinlan	United States	Indiana State Sycamores	xxo	o	xxx						1.77 m (5 ft 9 1/2 in)	
18	Celia Rifaterra	Spain	Virginia Cavaliers	o	xo	xxx						1.77 m (5 ft 9 1/2 in)	
19	Claire Bryant	United States	Florida Gators	xo	xo	xxx						1.77 m (5 ft 9 1/2 in)	
20	Meghan Fletcher	United States	Murray State Racers	o	xxo	xxx						1.77 m (5 ft 9 1/2 in)	
T21	Nissi Kabongo	United States	Texas A&M Aggies	xo	xxo	xxx						1.77 m (5 ft 9 1/2 in)	
T21	Katie Isenbarger	United States	Western Kentucky Hilltoppers	xo	xxo	xxx						1.77 m (5 ft 9 1/2 in)	
23	Soledad Jean	United States	Louisville Cardinals	xo	xxx							1.72 m (5 ft 7 1/2 in)	
	Brianna Smith	United States	Duke Blue Devils	xxx								NM	

==== Women's pole vault ====
Placings in the women's pole vault the 2024 NCAA Division I Outdoor Track and Field Championships
Rank	Athlete	Nationality	Team	4.00	4.15	4.30	4.40	4.50	4.55	4.60	4.65	4.70	4.71	4.74	Mark	Notes
1st place, gold medalist(s)	Chloe Timberg	United States	Rutgers Scarlet Knights	-	o	o	o	o	o	o	xo	x-	o	xxx	4.71 m (15 ft 5 1/4 in)	PB, MR
2nd place, silver medalist(s)	Riley Felts	United States	Charlotte 49ers	-	o	o	o	xo	o	x-	x-	x			4.55 m (14 ft 11 in)	=PB
3rd place, bronze medalist(s)	Hana Moll	United States	Washington Huskies	-	o	o	o	xo	x-	xx					4.50 m (14 ft 9 in)	
4	Nastassja Campbell	United States	Washington Huskies	-	o	o	o	xxx							4.40 m (14 ft 5 in)	SB
5	Molly Haywood	United States	Baylor Bears	-	xxo	o	o	xxx							4.40 m (14 ft 5 in)	
5	Amanda Moll	United States	Washington Huskies	-	xo	xo	o	xxx							4.40 m (14 ft 5 in)	
7	Tori Thomas	United States	Illinois Fighting Illini	-	o	xxo	xo	xxx							4.40 m (14 ft 5 in)	
8	Olivia Lueking	United States	Oklahoma Sooners	-	o	o	xxx								4.30 m (14 ft 1 1/4 in)	
8	Payton Phillips	United States	Kentucky Wildcats	4.30 m (14 ft 1 1/4 in)	o	o	o	xxx								=PB
10	Katie Urbine	United States	Liberty Flames	o	xo	o	xxx								4.30 m (14 ft 1 1/4 in)	=PB
11	Rebekah Erikson	United States	BYU Cougars	o	xxo	o	xxx								4.30 m (14 ft 1 1/4 in)	
12	Gen Hirata	United States	South Dakota Coyotes	o	o	xo	xxx								4.30 m (14 ft 1 1/4 in)	
13	Sarah Schmitt	United States	Tennessee Volunteers	o	o	xxo	xxx								4.30 m (14 ft 1 1/4 in)	
14	Chiara Sistermann	Germany	Virginia Tech Hokies	o	xo	xxo	xxx								4.30 m (14 ft 1 1/4 in)	=PB
15	Abby Knouff	United States	Cincinnati Bearcats	xo	xo	xxo	xxx								4.30 m (14 ft 1 1/4 in)	=PB
16	Mason Meinershagen	United States	Kansas Jayhawks	o	o	xxx									4.15 m (13 ft 7 1/4 in)	
17	Alyssa Quinones-Mixon	United States	Auburn Tigers	xo	o	xxx									4.15 m (13 ft 7 1/4 in)	
18	Rachel Homoly	United States	Arkansas Razorbacks	xxo	o	xxx									4.15 m (13 ft 7 1/4 in)	
19	Journey Gurley	United States	Virginia Tech Hokies	o	xo	xxx									4.15 m (13 ft 7 1/4 in)	
20	Heather Abadie	United States	Texas A&M Aggies	xo	xo	xxx									4.15 m (13 ft 7 1/4 in)	
20	Tessa Mudd	United States	Princeton Tigers	xo	xo	xxx									4.15 m (13 ft 7 1/4 in)	
22	Mia Morello	United States	Illinois Fighting Illini	xo	xxx										4.00 m (13 ft 1 1/4 in)	
	Natalie Lark	United States	Louisville Cardinals	-	xxx										NH	
	Victoria Faber	United States	Alabama Crimson Tide	xxx											NH	

==== Women's shot put ====
Placings in the women's shot put at the 2024 NCAA Division I Outdoor Track and Field Championships
Rank	Athlete	Nationality	Team	1	2	3	4	5	6	Mark	Notes
1st place, gold medalist(s)	Jaida Ross	United States	Oregon Ducks	18.86	19.14	19.09	18.85	18.75	19.57	19.57 m (64 ft 2 1/4 in)	
2nd place, silver medalist(s)	Gabi Morris	United States	Colorado State Rams	16.92	17.65	18.66	17.15	X	X	18.66 m (61 ft 2 1/2 in)	PB
3rd place, bronze medalist(s)	Axelina Johansson	Sweden	Nebraska Cornhuskers	18.13	18.07	18.24	17.96	17.97	18.16	18.24 m (59 ft 10 in)	
4	Jayden Ulrich	United States	Louisville Cardinals	17.89	16.85	17.76	X	17.39	17.12	17.89 m (58 ft 8 1/4 in)	
5	Mya Lesnar	United States	Colorado State Rams	17.56	17.67	17.14	17.60	X	X	17.67 m (57 ft 11 1/2 in)	
6	Alida van Daalen	Netherlands	Florida Gators	16.55	17.45	X	17.52	X	X	17.52 m (57 ft 5 3/4 in)	
7	Sarah Omoregie	Great Britain	Vanderbilt Commodores	16.67	17.35	X	X	16.54	17.03	17.32 m (56 ft 9 3/4 in)	
8	Nina Ndubuisi	Germany	Texas Longhorns	17.15	X	X	16.32	17.12	16.92	17.15 m (56 ft 3 in)	
9	Marilyn Nwora	United States	Texas Longhorns	15.72	16.15	17.12	16.74	X	16.36	17.12 m (56 ft 2 in)	
10	Mensi Stiff	United States	Ole Miss Rebels	X	17.11	17.08				17.11 m (56 ft 1 1/2 in)	PB
11	Jhordyn Stallworth	United States	Mississippi State Bulldogs	17.05	16.90	16.54				17.05 m (55 ft 11 1/4 in)	
12	Megan Hague	United States	Auburn Tigers	16.08	16.97	16.72				16.97 m (55 ft 8 in)	PB
13	Chrystal Herpin	United States	Texas Longhorns	16.21	16.92	X				16.92 m (55 ft 6 in)	
14	Tuané Silver	Namibia	Oklahoma Sooners	15.94	16.46	16.77				16.77 m (55 ft 0 in)	
15	Gracelyn Leiseth	United States	Florida Gators	16.51	16.00	X				16.51 m (54 ft 2 in)	
16	Veronica Fraley	United States	Vanderbilt Commodores	16.44	X	X				16.44 m (53 ft 11 in)	
17	Anthonett Nabwe	United States	Minnesota Golden Gophers	16.41	15.34	X				16.41 m (53 ft 10 in)	
18	Nana Gyedu	Great Britain	Washington State Cougars	16.36	X	16.27				16.36 m (53 ft 8 in)	
19	Kelsie Murrell-Ross	Grenada	Georgia Bulldogs	X	X	16.18				16.18 m (53 ft 1 in)	
20	Katrin Brzyszkowska	Czech Republic	Virginia Tech Hokies	X	X	15.92				15.92 m (52 ft 2 3/4 in)	
21	Selase Sampram	United States	Arkansas State Red Wolves	X	X	15.43				15.43 m (50 ft 7 1/4 in)	
	Janae Profit	United States	Virginia Cavaliers	X	X	X				NM	
	Jordyn Bryant	United States	Fresno State Bulldogs	X	X	X				NM	
	Akaoma Odeluga	United States	Ole Miss Rebels	X	X	X				NM	

==== Women's discus throw ====
Placings in the women's discus throw at the 2024 NCAA Division I Outdoor Track and Field Championships
Rank	Athlete	Nationality	Team	Mark	Notes
1st place, gold medalist(s)	Veronica Fraley	United States	Vanderbilt Commodores	63.66 m (208 ft 10 1/4 in)	PB
2nd place, silver medalist(s)	Jayden Ulrich	United States	Louisville Cardinals	63.05 m (206 ft 10 1/4 in)	
3rd place, bronze medalist(s)	Alida Van Daalen	Netherlands	Florida Gators	62.44 m (204 ft 10 1/4 in)	
4	Shelby Frank	United States	Minnesota Golden Gophers	61.01 m (200 ft 1 3/4 in)	PB
5	Corinne Jemison	United States	Michigan Wolverines	60.07 m (197 ft 3/4 in)	PB
6	Michaela Hawkins	United States	Colorado State Rams	59.82 m (196 ft 3 in)	
7	Milina Wepiwe	Germany	Harvard Crimson	59.23 m (194 ft 3 3/4 in)	PB
8	Abigail Martin	Jamaica	Texas A&M Aggies	57.81 m (189 ft 7 3/4 in)	
9	Estel Valeanu	Israel	LSU Tigers	57.17 m (187 ft 6 3/4 in)	
10	Siniru Iheoma	United States	Princeton Tigers	55.91 m (183 ft 5 in)	
11	Halle Mohr	United States	Hawaii Rainbow Wahine	55.46 m (181 ft 11 1/4 in)	
12	Michaelle Valentin	United States	FIU Panthers	55.37 m (181 ft 7 3/4 in)	
13	Lyvante Su'emai	Australia	UCLA Bruins	55.27 m (181 ft 3 3/4 in)	
14	Jaida Ross	United States	Oregon Ducks	54.99 m (180 ft 4 3/4 in)	
15	Kalynn Meyer	United States	Nebraska Cornhuskers	54.63 m (179 ft 2 3/4 in)	
16	Gabby Morris	United States	Colorado State Rams	54.56 m (179 ft 0 in)	
17	Ines Lopez	Spain	Arizona State Sun Devils	54.54 m (178 ft 11 in)	
18	Zoe Burleson	United States	Texas Tech Red Raiders	54.22 m (177 ft 10 1/2 in)	
19	Faith Bender	United States	Ohio State Buckeyes	54.14 m (177 ft 7 1/4 in)	
20	Gabrielle Bailey	Jamaica	Kent State Golden Flashes	53.79 m (176 ft 5 1/2 in)	
21	Lena Braunagel	Germany	Wake Forest Demon Deacons	52.59 m (172 ft 6 1/4 in)	
22	Gretchen Hoekstre	United States	BYU Cougars	50.83 m (166 ft 9 in)	
23	Jordyn Bryant	United States	Fresno State Bulldogs	50.77 m (166 ft 6 3/4 in)	
24	Marley Raikiwasa	Australia	Auburn Tigers	50.64 m (166 ft 1 1/2 in)	

==== Women's javelin throw ====
Placings in the women's javelin throw at the 2024 NCAA Division I Outdoor Track and Field Championships
Rank	Athlete	Nationality	Team	Mark	Notes
1st place, gold medalist(s)	Rhema Otabor	Bahamas	Nebraska Cornhuskers	64.19 m (210 ft 7 in)	PB, MR, CR
2nd place, silver medalist(s)	Lianna Davidson	Australia	Texas A&M Aggies	60.70 m (199 ft 1 3/4 in)	PB
3rd place, bronze medalist(s)	McKyla Van Der Westhuizen	South Africa	Rice Owls	57.51 m (188 ft 8 in)	PB
4	Irene Jepkemboi	Kenya	TCU Horned Frogs	56.51 m (185 ft 4 3/4 in)	
5	Eniko Sara	Canada	Nebraska Cornhuskers	55.66 m (182 ft 7 1/4 in)	PB
6	Skylar Ciccolini	United States	Missouri Tigers	55.06 m (180 ft 7 1/2 in)	SB
7	Trinity Spooner	United States	LSU Tigers	54.81 m (179 ft 9 3/4 in)	
8	Deisiane Teixeira	Brazil	Miami Hurricanes	54.54 m (178 ft 11 in)	
9	Kayla Thorpe	United States	Maryland Terrapins	53.44 m (175 ft 3 3/4 in)	PB
10	Erin McMeniman	United States	Georgia Bulldogs	53.32 m (174 ft 11 in)	PB
11	Arianne Morais	Norway	UTEP Miners	53.05 m (174 ft 1/2 in)	
12	Federica Botter	Italy	UCLA Bruins	52.78 m (173 ft 1 3/4 in)	
13	Evelyn Bliss	United States	Bucknell Bison	52.77 m (173 ft 1 1/2 in)	
14	Emma Yungeberg	United States	Michigan Wolverines	52.36 m (171 ft 9 1/4 in)	PB
15	Mirta Kulisic	Croatia	Nebraska Cornhuskers	51.82 m (170 ft 0 in)	
16	Shea Greene	United States	Princeton Tigers	51.57 m (169 ft 2 1/4 in)	
17	Maria Bienvenu	United States	TCU Horned Frogs	50.52 m (165 ft 8 3/4 in)	
18	Christiana Ellina	Cyprus	FIU Panthers	50.31 m (165 ft 1/2 in)	
19	Emanuela Casadei	Italy	Nebraska Cornhuskers	50.24 m (164 ft 9 3/4 in)	
20	Casey Bogues	United States	Dayton Flyers	50.15 m (164 ft 6 1/4 in)	
21	Elizabeth Bailey	United States	Charlotte 49ers	49.96 m (163 ft 10 3/4 in)	
22	Harriette Mortlock	Great Britain	Fresno State Bulldogs	49.37 m (161 ft 11 1/2 in)	
23	Ella Knott	United States	Mississippi State Bulldogs	49.35 m (161 ft 10 3/4 in)	
24	Shaniya Holley	United States	Auburn Tigers	47.55 m (156 ft 0 in)	

==== Women's hammer throw ====
Placings in the women's hammer throw at the 2024 NCAA Division I Outdoor Track and Field Championships
Rank	Athlete	Nationality	Team	1	2	3	4	5	6	Mark	Notes
1st place, gold medalist(s)	Elísabet Rut Rúnarsdóttir	Iceland	Texas State Bobcats	67.22	X	70.74	70.00	68.84	X	70.04 m (229 ft 9 1/4 in)	
2nd place, silver medalist(s)	Tara Simpson-Sullivan	Great Britain	Rice Owls	X	58.24	67.93	63.63	69.94	X	69.94 m (229 ft 5 1/2 in)	PB
3rd place, bronze medalist(s)	Jalani Davis	United States	Ole Miss Rebels	67.33	X	67.18	69.86	X	X	69.86 m (229 ft 2 1/4 in)	PB
4	Shelby Moran	United States	Oregon Ducks	X	68.09	69.33	69.43	X	68.04	69.43 m (227 ft 9 1/4 in)	
5	Guðrún Karítas Hallgrímsdóttir	Iceland	VCU Rams	68.89	64.06	X	X	65.67	69.12	69.12 m (226 ft 9 1/4 in)	
6	Mayyi Mahama	United States	UCLA Bruins	64.31	61.67	66.56	68.69	X	X	68.69 m (225 ft 4 1/4 in)	PB
7	Shelby Frank	United States	Minnesota Golden Gophers	62.10	68.40	X	X	X	67.19	68.40 m (224 ft 4 3/4 in)	PB
8	Amber Simpson	Great Britain	Illinois Fighting Illini	66.41	64.26	67.73	66.82	65.74	64.78	67.53 m (221 ft 6 1/2 in)	
9	Kate Powers	United States	Kentucky Wildcats	60.74	65.72	X	X	X	61.51	65.72 m (215 ft 7 1/4 in)	PB
10	Emily Fink	United States	Army Black Knights	X	65.01	X				65.01 m (213 ft 3 1/4 in)	
11	Paola Bueno Calvillo	Mexico	Liberty Lady Flames	X	64.43	X				64.43 m (211 ft 4 1/2 in)	PB
12	Michaelle Valentin	United States	FIU Panthers	55.66	64.33	61.31				64.33 m (211 ft 1/2 in)	PB
13	Samantha Kunza	United States	Saint Louis Billikens	57.85	63.29	X				63.29 m (207 ft 7 1/2 in)	
14	Lara Roberts	Australia	Texas State Bobcats	63.06	62.37	X				63.06 m (206 ft 10 1/2 in)	
15	Ludith Campos	United States	Albany Great Danes	60.32	61.58	62.72				62.72 m (205 ft 9 1/4 in)	PB
16	Lexi Maples	New Zealand	North Dakota State Bison	61.96	61.28	61.96				61.96 m (203 ft 3 1/4 in)	
17	Olivia Roberts	United States	Wisconsin Badgers	61.88	61.17	58.82				61.88 m (203 ft 0 in)	
18	Skylar Soli	United States	Ole Miss Rebels	60.66	61.72	60.98				61.72 m (202 ft 5 3/4 in)	
19	Moorea Mitchell	United States	Duke Blue Devils	61.36	X	59.85				61.36 m (201 ft 3 1/2 in)	PB
20	Mackenzie Wilson	Canada	Maine Black Bears	61.31	X	61.14				61.31 m (201 ft 1 3/4 in)	
21	Amelia DiPaola	United States	Fresno State Bulldogs	X	61.01	61.00				61.01 m (200 ft 1 3/4 in)	
22	Hillevi Carlsson	Sweden	Nebraska Cornhuskers	60.20	60.91	X				60.91 m (199 ft 10 in)	
	Stephanie Ratcliffe	Australia	Georgia Bulldogs	X	X	X				NM	
	Marie Forbes	Jamaica	Clemson Tigers	X	X	X				NM	

==== Women's heptathlon ====
Placings in the women's heptathlon at the 2024 NCAA Division I Outdoor Track and Field Championships
Rank	Athlete	Nationality	Team	Overall points	100 m	HJ	SP	200 m	LJ	JT	800 m
1st place, gold medalist(s)	Timara Chapman	United States	Texas A&M Aggies	6339	1065; 13.40	991; 1.81 m (5 ft 11 1/4 in)	775; 13.72 m (45 ft 0 in)	963; 24.18	949; 6.32 m (20 ft 8 3/4 in)	716; 42.53 m (139 ft 6 1/4 in)	880; 2:15.92
2nd place, silver medalist(s)	Jadin O'Brien	United States	Notre Dame Fighting Irish	6234	1072; 13.35	806; 1.66 m (5 ft 5 1/4 in)	852; 14.86 m (48 ft 9 in)	965; 24.16	940; 6.29 m (20 ft 7 1/2 in)	708; 42.12 m (138 ft 2 1/4 in)	891; 2:15:09
3rd place, bronze medalist(s)	Kristine Blazevica	Latvia	Texas Longhorns	6126	1071; 13.36	916; 1.75 m (5 ft 8 3/4 in)	707; 12.70 m (41 ft 8 in)	913; 24.72	871; 6.07 m (19 ft 10 3/4 in)	741; 43.82 m (143 ft 9 in)	907; 2:14:01
4	Jenelle Rogers	United States	Ball State Cardinals	5991	1026; 13.67	806; 1.66 m (5 ft 5 1/4 in)	856; 14.93 m (48 ft 11 3/4 in)	1019; 23.60	924; 6.24 m (20 ft 5 1/2 in)	528; 32.73 m (107 ft 4 1/2 in)	832; 2:19.40
5	Angel Richmore	Sweden	Oklahoma Sooners	0000	968; 14.07	953; 1.78 m (5 ft 10 in)	816; 14.33 m (47 ft 0 in)	861; 25.28	837; 5.96 m (19 ft 6 1/2 in)	628; 37.94 m (124 ft 5 1/2 in)	806; 2:21:31
6	Bailey Golden	United States	Oklahoma State Cowgirls	5848	998; 13.86	916; 1.75 m (5 ft 8 3/4 in)	678; 12.26 m (40 ft 2 1/2 in)	882; 25.05	859; 6.03 m (19 ft 9 1/4 in)	731; 43.32 m (142 ft 1 1/2 in)	784; 2:22.94
7	Charity Hufnagel	United States	Kentucky Wildcats	5846	959; 14.14	1067; 1.87 m (6 ft 1 1/2 in)	756; 13.43 m (44 ft 1/2 in)	873; 25.15	786; 5.79 m (18 ft 11 3/4 in)	553; 34.03 m (111 ft 7 3/4 in)	852; 2:17.91
8	Annika Williams	United States	Oregon Ducks	5832	1014; 13.75	953; 1.78 m (5 ft 10 in)	828; 14.51 m (47 ft 7 1/4 in)	895; 24.91	843; 5.98 m (19 ft 7 1/4 in)	582; 35.53 m (116 ft 6 3/4 in)	717; 2:28:09
9	Jenna Fee Feyerabend	Germany	San Diego State Aztecs	5812	978; 14.00	916; 1.75 m (5 ft 8 3/4 in)	780; 13.79 m (45 ft 2 3/4 in)	812; 25.83	756; 5.69 m (18 ft 8 in)	697; 41.55 m (136 ft 3 3/4 in)	873; 2:15:38
10	Joniar Thomas	Grenada	Texas A&M Aggies	5799	974; 14.03	771; 1.63 m (5 ft 4 in)	664; 12.04 m (39 ft 6 in)	1022; 23.57	953; 6.33 m (20 ft 9 in)	637; 38.44 m (126 ft 1 1/4 in)	778; 2:23:38
11	Avery McMullen	United States	Colorado Buffaloes	5771	1039; 13.58	916; 1.75 m (5 ft 8 3/4 in)	621; 11.39 m (37 ft 4 1/4 in)	963; 24.19	843; 5.98 m (19 ft 7 1/4 in)	603; 36.65 m (120 ft 2 3/4 in)	786; 2:22.77
12	Urte Bacianskaite	Lithuania	Kansas State Wildcats	5696	879; 14.72	806; 1.66 m (5 ft 5 1/4 in)	822; 14.42 m (47 ft 3 1/2 in)	846; 25.45	786; 5.79 m (18 ft 11 3/4 in)	811; 47.48 m (155 ft 9 1/4 in)	746; 2:25:80
13	Destiny Masters	United States	Wichita State Shockers	5691	1004; 13.82	1029; 1.84 m (6 ft 1/4 in)	686; 12.37 m (40 ft 7 in)	879; 25.09	738; 5.63 m (18 ft 5 1/2 in)	638; 38.46 m (126 ft 2 in)	717; 2:28.11
14	Juliette Laracuente-Huebner	United States	Cincinnati Bearcats	5688	997; 13.87	879; 1.72 m (5 ft 7 1/2 in)	552; 10.35 m (33 ft 11 1/4 in)	929; 24.54	877; 6.09 m (19 ft 11 3/4 in)	551; 33.93 m (111 ft 3 3/4 in)	903; 2:14:26
15	Taylor Chocek	United States	Oregon Ducks	5674	1027; 13.66	806; 1.66 m (5 ft 5 1/4 in)	746; 13.28 m (43 ft 6 3/4 in)	929; 24.54	726; 5.59 m (18 ft 4 in)	699; 41.63 m (136 ft 6 3/4 in)	741; 2:26.24
16	Olivija Vaitaityte	United States	Oklahoma State Cowgirls	5625	906; 14.52	953; 1.78 m (5 ft 10 in)	663; 12.03 m (39 ft 5 1/2 in)	797; 26.00	786; 5.79 m (18 ft 11 3/4 in)	587; 35.79 m (117 ft 5 in)	933; 2:12.21
17	Dominique Biron	Lithuania	Northeastern Huskies	5622	995; 13.88	736; 1.60 m (5 ft 2 3/4 in)	663; 12.03 m (39 ft 5 1/2 in)	917; 24.67	810; 5.87 m (19 ft 3 in)	594; 36.17 m (118 ft 8 in)	907; 2:13.96
18	Izzy Goudros	Canada	Harvard Crimson	5609	964; 14.10	771; 1.63 m (5 ft 4 in)	633; 11.58 m (37 ft 11 3/4 in)	1013; 23.67	744; 5.65 m (18 ft 6 1/4 in)	563; 34.55 m (113 ft 4 in)	921; 2:13.04

== Standings ==
Top 10 men's team scores at the 2024 NCAA Division I Outdoor Track and Field Championships
Rank	Team	Conference	Score
1st place, gold medalist(s)	Florida Gators	SEC	41
2nd place, silver medalist(s)	Auburn Tigers	SEC	40
3rd place, bronze medalist(s)	USC Trojans	Pac-12	33
4	Alabama Crimson Tide	SEC	32
5	Texas A&M Aggies	SEC	31
6	Houston Cougars	Big 12	30.5
7	Arkansas Razorbacks	SEC	30
8	Virginia Cavaliers	ACC	26
9	Georgia Bulldogs	SEC	25
10	Kansas Jayhawks	Big 12	22

Top 10 women's team scores at the 2024 NCAA Division I Outdoor Track and Field Championships
Rank	Team	Conference	Score
1st place, gold medalist(s)	Arkansas Razorbacks	SEC	63
2nd place, silver medalist(s)	Florida Gators	SEC	59
3rd place, bronze medalist(s)	Texas Longhorns	Big 12	41
4	Oregon Ducks	Pac-12	40.5
5	Ole Miss Rebels	SEC	38
6	LSU Tigers	SEC	31
7	Texas Tech Red Raiders	Big 12	26
8	Alabama Crimson Tide	SEC	26
9	Nebraska Cornhuskers	Big Ten	25.5
10	Texas A&M Aggies	SEC	25

== Schedule ==
Schedule of the 2024 NCAA Division I Outdoor Track and Field Championships
Date	Category	Time (ET)	Event	Round division
Wednesday, June 5	Track events	4:32 p.m.	4×100 relay	Semifinal men
Wednesday, June 5	Track events	4:46 p.m.	1500 meters	Semifinal men
Wednesday, June 5	Track events	5:02 p.m.	3000 steeplechase	Semifinal men
Wednesday, June 5	Track events	5:32 p.m.	110 meter hurdles	Semifinal men
Wednesday, June 5	Track events	5:46 p.m.	100 meters	Semifinal men
Wednesday, June 5	Track events	6:00 p.m.	400 meters	Semifinal men
Wednesday, June 5	Track events	6:14 p.m.	800 meters	Semifinal men
Wednesday, June 5	Track events	6:30 p.m.	400 meter hurdles	Semifinal men
Wednesday, June 5	Track events	6:44 p.m.	200 meters	Semifinal men
Wednesday, June 5	Track events	6:56 p.m.	400 meters	Decathlon
Wednesday, June 5	Track events	7:08 p.m.	10,000 meters	Final men
Wednesday, June 5	Track events	7:48 p.m.	4×400 relay	Semifinal men
Wednesday, June 5	Field events	12:30 p.m.	Hammer throw	Final men
Wednesday, June 5	Field events	3:40 p.m.	Javelin throw	Final men
Wednesday, June 5	Field events	4:30 p.m.	Pole vault	Final men
Wednesday, June 5	Field events	6:00 p.m.	Long jump	Final men
Wednesday, June 5	Field events	6:10 p.m.	Shot put	Final men
Wednesday, June 5	Men decathlon	12:30 p.m.	100 meters	Decathlon men
Wednesday, June 5	Men decathlon	1:10 p.m.	Long jump	Decathlon men
Wednesday, June 5	Men decathlon	2:25 p.m.	Shot put	Decathlon men
Wednesday, June 5	Men decathlon	3:40 p.m.	High jump	Decathlon men
Wednesday, June 5	Men decathlon	6:56 p.m.	400 meters	Decathlon men
Thursday, June 6	Track events	5:32 p.m.	4×100 relay	Semifinal women
Thursday, June 6	Track events	5:46 p.m.	1500 meters	Semifinal women
Thursday, June 6	Track events	6:02 p.m.	3000 steeplechase	Semifinal women
Thursday, June 6	Track events	6:32 p.m.	100 meter hurdles	Semifinal women
Thursday, June 6	Track events	6:46 p.m.	100 meters	Semifinal women
Thursday, June 6	Track events	7:00 p.m.	400 meters	Semifinal women
Thursday, June 6	Track events	7:14 p.m.	800 meters	Semifinal women
Thursday, June 6	Track events	7:30 p.m.	400 meter hurdles	Semifinal women
Thursday, June 6	Track events	7:44 p.m.	200 meters	Semifinal women
Thursday, June 6	Track events	7:56 p.m.	1500 meters	Decathlon
Thursday, June 6	Track events	8:08 p.m.	10,000 meters	Final women
Thursday, June 6	Track events	8:48 p.m.	4×400 relay	Semifinal women
Thursday, June 6	Field events	3:00 p.m.	Hammer throw	Final women
Thursday, June 6	Field events	5:10 p.m.	Javelin throw	Final women
Thursday, June 6	Field events	5:30 p.m.	Pole vault	Final women
Thursday, June 6	Field events	7:00 p.m.	Long jump	Final women
Thursday, June 6	Field events	7:10 p.m.	Shot put	Final women
Thursday, June 6	Men decathlon	10:30 a.m.	110 hurdles	Decathlon men
Thursday, June 6	Men decathlon	11:20 a.m.	Discus	Decathlon men
Thursday, June 6	Men decathlon	12:30 p.m.	Pole vault	Decathlon men
Thursday, June 6	Men decathlon	3:00 p.m.	Javelin	Decathlon men
Thursday, June 6	Men decathlon	7:56 p.m.	1500 meters	Decathlon men
Friday, June 7	Track events	6:02 p.m.	4×100 relay	Final men
Friday, June 7	Track events	6:12 p.m.	1500 meters	Final men
Friday, June 7	Track events	6:24 p.m.	3000 Steeplechase	Final men
Friday, June 7	Track events	6:42 p.m.	110 meter hurdles	Final men
Friday, June 7	Track events	6:52 p.m.	100 meters	Final men
Friday, June 7	Track events	7:02 p.m.	400 meters	Final men
Friday, June 7	Track events	7:14 p.m.	800 meters	Final men
Friday, June 7	Track events	7:27 p.m.	400 meter hurdles	Final men
Friday, June 7	Track events	7:37 p.m.	200 meters	Final men
Friday, June 7	Track events	7:43 p.m.	200 meters	Heptathlon
Friday, June 7	Track events	7:55 p.m.	5000 meters	Final men
Friday, June 7	Track events	8:21 p.m.	4×400 relay	Final men
Friday, June 7	Field events	5:30 p.m.	High jump	Final men
Friday, June 7	Field events	5:35 p.m.	Discus	Final men
Friday, June 7	Field events	6:10 p.m.	Triple jump	Final men
Friday, June 7	Women heptathlon	12:45 p.m.	100 meters	Heptathlon women
Friday, June 7	Women heptathlon	1:45 p.m.	High jump	Heptathlon women
Friday, June 7	Women heptathlon	3:45 p.m.	Shot put	Heptathlon women
Friday, June 7	Women heptathlon	7:43 p.m.	200 meters	Heptathlon women
Saturday, June 8	Track events	6:02 p.m.	4×100 relay	Final women
Saturday, June 8	Track events	6:12 p.m.	1500 meters	Final women
Saturday, June 8	Track events	6:24 p.m.	3000 steeplechase	Final women
Saturday, June 8	Track events	6:42 p.m.	100 meter hurdles	Final women
Saturday, June 8	Track events	6:52 p.m.	100 meters	Final women
Saturday, June 8	Track events	7:02 p.m.	400 meters	Final women
Saturday, June 8	Track events	7:14 p.m.	800 meters	Final women
Saturday, June 8	Track events	7:27 p.m.	400 meter hurdles	Final women
Saturday, June 8	Track events	7:37 p.m.	200 meters	Final women
Saturday, June 8	Track events	7:43 p.m.	800 meters	Heptathlon
Saturday, June 8	Track events	7:55 p.m.	5000 meters	Final women
Saturday, June 8	Track events	8:21 p.m.	4×400 relay	Final women
Saturday, June 8	Field events	5:30 p.m.	High jump	Final women
Saturday, June 8	Field events	5:35 p.m.	Discus	Final women
Saturday, June 8	Field events	6:10 p.m.	Triple jump	Final women
Saturday, June 8	Women heptathlon	2:00 p.m.	Long jump	Heptathlon women
Saturday, June 8	Women heptathlon	3:15 p.m.	Javelin	Heptathlon women
Saturday, June 8	Women heptathlon	7:43 p.m.	800 meters	Heptathlon women

== See also ==
- NCAA Men's Division I Outdoor Track and Field Championships
- NCAA Women's Division I Outdoor Track and Field Championships
- 2024 NCAA Division I Indoor Track and Field Championships
