= Wichita State Shockers track and field =

College track and field team

- University: Wichita State University
- Head coach: Steve Rainbolt
- Conference: The American
- Location: Wichita, Kansas
- Outdoor track: Cessna Stadium
- Nickname: Shockers
- Colors: Black and yellow

The Wichita State Shockers track and field team is the track and field program that represents Wichita State University. The Shockers compete in NCAA Division I as a member of the American Conference. The team is based in Wichita, Kansas at the Cessna Stadium.

The program is coached by Steve Rainbolt. The track and field program officially encompasses four teams, as the NCAA regards men's and women's indoor track and field and outdoor track and field as separate sports.

Harold Manning was the Schockers' first NCAA champion and Olympian, setting the 3000 m steeplechase world record at the 1936 United States Olympic trials.

== Postseason ==
As of 2024, a total of 28 men and 13 women have achieved individual first-team All-American status at the men's outdoor, women's outdoor, men's indoor, or women's indoor national championships.

First team All-Americans
Team	Championships	Name	Event	Place	Ref.
Men's	1929 Outdoor	Hal Manning	3000 meters	2nd	
Men's	1930 Outdoor	Hal Manning	3000 meters	1st	
Men's	1933 Outdoor	Gerald Kepner	Long jump	4th	
Men's	1959 Outdoor	Lew Merriman	800 meters	4th	
Men's	1959 Outdoor	Walter Cokreham	Javelin throw	6th	
Men's	1963 Outdoor	Cal Elmore	Mile run	2nd	
Men's	1966 Outdoor	Fred Burton	Pole vault	3rd	
Men's	1967 Indoor	Fred Burton	Pole vault	3rd	
Men's	1970 Outdoor	Preston Carrington	110 meters hurdles	7th	
Men's	1970 Outdoor	Preston Carrington	Long jump	3rd	
Men's	1971 Outdoor	Preston Carrington	Long jump	6th	
Men's	1974 Outdoor	Temoer Terry	High jump	6th	
Men's	1975 Indoor	Randy Smith	3000 meters	3rd	
Men's	1975 Outdoor	Randy Smith	3000 meters steeplechase	2nd	
Men's	1976 Outdoor	Bob Christensen	3000 meters steeplechase	8th	
Men's	1978 Outdoor	Don Duvall	Long jump	6th	
Men's	1979 Outdoor	Don Duvall	Long jump	8th	
Women's	1986 Indoor	Connie Long	High jump	6th	
Women's	1989 Indoor	Connie Long	High jump	4th	
Men's	1989 Outdoor	Gene Abernathy	Discus throw	7th	
Women's	1989 Outdoor	Connie Long	High jump	2nd	
Men's	1991 Outdoor	Mornay Annandale	10,000 meters	6th	
Men's	1992 Indoor	John Hamilton	Weight throw	2nd	
Women's	1993 Outdoor	Denise Brungardt	Heptathlon	6th	
Men's	1995 Outdoor	Einārs Tupurītis	800 meters	8th	
Men's	1996 Indoor	Einārs Tupurītis	800 meters	1st	
Men's	1996 Indoor	Einārs Tupurītis	800 meters	1st	
Men's	1996 Indoor	Ryan Barkdull	Pole vault	2nd	
Men's	1996 Outdoor	Einārs Tupurītis	800 meters	1st	
Women's	1996 Outdoor	Katie Panek	Hammer throw	8th	
Men's	1997 Indoor	Clint Panek	Weight throw	7th	
Men's	1997 Outdoor	Jay Krom	Javelin throw	6th	
Women's	1998 Indoor	Katie Panek	Weight throw	5th	
Women's	1998 Outdoor	Katie Panek	Hammer throw	4th	
Men's	2001 Outdoor	Viktors Lacis	400 meters hurdles	3rd	
Men's	2002 Indoor	Randy Lewis	Long jump	7th	
Women's	2002 Indoor	Ineta Radevica	Long jump	6th	
Women's	2002 Indoor	Ineta Radevica	Triple jump	4th	
Men's	2002 Outdoor	Randy Lewis	Long jump	2nd	
Women's	2002 Outdoor	Ineta Radevica	Triple jump	2nd	
Men's	2003 Outdoor	Randy Lewis	Triple jump	5th	
Men's	2003 Outdoor	Jens Lukoschat	Decathlon	7th	
Men's	2004 Indoor	Shannon Armstrong	60 meters hurdles	7th	
Women's	2005 Outdoor	Desiraye Osburn	5000 meters	7th	
Women's	2006 Indoor	Desiraye Osburn	Mile run	8th	
Women's	2006 Outdoor	Desiraye Osburn	5000 meters	4th	
Women's	2006 Outdoor	Jackie Brown	Pole vault	3rd	
Women's	2009 Indoor	Kellyn Johnson	Mile run	3rd	
Men's	2010 Indoor	Chris Dickman	Heptathlon	7th	
Women's	2011 Indoor	Aliphine Tuliamuk	5000 meters	8th	
Women's	2011 Outdoor	Aliphine Tuliamuk	5000 meters	8th	
Women's	2011 Outdoor	Aliphine Tuliamuk	10,000 meters	5th	
Women's	2011 Outdoor	Tonya Nero	10,000 meters	7th	
Women's	2012 Indoor	Aliphine Tuliamuk	3000 meters	7th	
Women's	2012 Indoor	Aliphine Tuliamuk	5000 meters	3rd	
Women's	2012 Outdoor	Aliphine Tuliamuk	5000 meters	5th	
Women's	2012 Outdoor	Aliphine Tuliamuk	10,000 meters	2nd	
Women's	2013 Indoor	Aliphine Tuliamuk	3000 meters	6th	
Women's	2013 Indoor	Aliphine Tuliamuk	5000 meters	3rd	
Women's	2013 Outdoor	Aliphine Tuliamuk	5000 meters	4th	
Women's	2013 Outdoor	Aliphine Tuliamuk	10,000 meters	2nd	
Women's	2013 Outdoor	Tanya Friesen	Heptathlon	5th	
Women's	2015 Outdoor	Nikki Larch-Miller	Heptathlon	8th	
Men's	2017 Outdoor	Hunter Veith	Decathlon	6th	
Men's	2018 Indoor	Hunter Veith	Heptathlon	2nd	
Men's	2018 Outdoor	Aaron True	Javelin throw	8th	
Men's	2019 Outdoor	Aaron True	Javelin throw	5th	
Women's	2019 Outdoor	Rebekah Topham	3000 meters steeplechase	8th	
Men's	2022 Outdoor	Michael Bryan	Hammer throw	5th	
Men's	2022 Outdoor	Taran Taylor	Javelin throw	4th	
Men's	2023 Indoor	Brady Palen	High jump	7th	
Women's	2024 Indoor	Destiny Masters	Pentathlon	6th	
Men's	2024 Outdoor	Brady Palen	High jump	8th	

== See also ==
- Category:Wichita State Shockers men's track and field athletes (6)
- Category:Wichita State Shockers women's track and field athletes (6)
