= UTSA Roadrunners track and field =

College track and field team

- University: University of Texas at San Antonio
- Head coach: Aaron Fox
- Conference: The American
- Location: San Antonio, Texas
- Outdoor track: Park West Athletics Complex
- Nickname: Roadrunners
- Colors: Navy blue, orange, and white

The UTSA Roadrunners track and field team is the track and field program that represents University of Texas at San Antonio. The Roadrunners compete in NCAA Division I as a member of the American Conference. The team is based in San Antonio, Texas at the Park West Athletics Complex.

The program is coached by Aaron Fox. The track and field program officially encompasses four teams, as the NCAA regards men's and women's indoor track and field and outdoor track and field as separate sports.

UTSA sprinter Leonard Byrd qualified for the 2001 World Championships in Athletics in the 4 × 400 m relay, winning the gold medal before being disqualified due to his teammate doping. Byrd was considered a hopeful for the 1996 Olympic team.

== Postseason ==
As of 2024, a total of 10 men and 7 women have achieved individual first-team All-American status at the men's outdoor, women's outdoor, men's indoor, or women's indoor national championships.

First team All-Americans
Team	Championships	Name	Event	Place	Ref.
Women's	1985 Outdoor	Starlite Williams	Triple jump	8th	
Women's	1989 Indoor	Jody Dunston	3000 meters	4th	
Women's	1989 Outdoor	Jody Dunston	5000 meters	4th	
Women's	1989 Outdoor	Jody Dunston	10,000 meters	3rd	
Women's	1990 Indoor	Teresa Neighbors	55 meters	3rd	
Women's	1992 Outdoor	Rosalyn King	4 × 400 meters relay	4th	
Women's	1992 Outdoor	Tammy Booker	4 × 400 meters relay	4th	
Women's	1992 Outdoor	Lisa Addison	4 × 400 meters relay	4th	
Women's	1992 Outdoor	Portia Matthews	4 × 400 meters relay	4th	
Men's	1995 Outdoor	Leonard Byrd	400 meters	7th	
Women's	1996 Indoor	Tameka Roberts	Long jump	6th	
Men's	1996 Outdoor	Leonard Byrd	400 meters	3rd	
Women's	1997 Indoor	Tameka Roberts	200 meters	4th	
Men's	1997 Outdoor	Leonard Byrd	400 meters	7th	
Women's	1998 Indoor	Tameka Roberts	200 meters	5th	
Men's	2002 Outdoor	Justin Youngblood	Decathlon	7th	
Women's	2002 Outdoor	Rhonda Ray	Heptathlon	7th	
Men's	2004 Indoor	Justin Youngblood	Heptathlon	7th	
Men's	2004 Outdoor	Justin Youngblood	Decathlon	7th	
Women's	2004 Outdoor	Ryanne Dupree	Heptathlon	7th	
Men's	2005 Indoor	Brandon Buteaux	Heptathlon	7th	
Women's	2005 Outdoor	Ryanne Dupree	Heptathlon	8th	
Women's	2006 Indoor	Ryanne Dupree	Pentathlon	4th	
Men's	2007 Outdoor	Larry Brooks	800 meters	8th	
Women's	2007 Outdoor	Ryanne Dupree	Heptathlon	6th	
Men's	2008 Outdoor	Teddy Williams	100 meters	7th	
Men's	2009 Indoor	Teddy Williams	60 meters	8th	
Men's	2010 Indoor	Teddy Williams	60 meters	4th	
Men's	2010 Outdoor	Devon Bond	Triple jump	5th	
Men's	2012 Outdoor	Keyunta Hayes	400 meters hurdles	4th	
Men's	2013 Indoor	Richard Garrett Jr.	Shot put	4th	
Men's	2014 Outdoor	Keyunta Hayes	400 meters hurdles	6th	
Men's	2014 Outdoor	Richard Garrett Jr.	Shot put	4th	
Men's	2022 Indoor	Jemuel Miller	Triple jump	6th	
Men's	2023 Outdoor	Jack Turner	Decathlon	7th	
Women's	2024 Indoor	Ida Andrea Breigan	Long jump	6th	
Women's	2024 Outdoor	Ida Andrea Breigan	Long jump	8th	

== See also ==
- Category:UTSA Roadrunners men's track and field athletes (3)
- Category:UTSA Roadrunners women's track and field athletes (3)
