= Charlotte 49ers track and field =

College track and field team

- University: University of North Carolina at Charlotte
- Head coach: Bob Olesen; Joseph Lynn (distance)
- Conference: The American
- Location: Charlotte, North Carolina
- Outdoor track: Irwin Belk Track and Field Center/Transamerica Field
- Nickname: 49ers
- Colors: Green and white

The Charlotte 49ers track and field team is the track and field program that represents University of North Carolina at Charlotte. The 49ers compete in NCAA Division I as a member of the American Conference. The team is based in Charlotte, North Carolina at the Irwin Belk Track and Field Center/Transamerica Field.

The program is coached by Bob Olesen and Joseph Lynn (distance). The track and field program officially encompasses four teams, as the NCAA regards men's and women's indoor track and field and outdoor track and field as separate sports.

Several 49ers attempted to make the Olympic team at the 2024 United States Olympic trials. Former 49ers athlete Abraham Morlu represented Liberia in the 2000 Olympic 4 × 100 m.

== Postseason ==
As of 2024, a total of 6 men and 8 women have achieved All-American status at the men's outdoor, women's outdoor, men's indoor, or women's indoor national championships.

First Team All-Americans
Team	Championships	Name	Event	Place
Men's	2000 Outdoor	Rephel Martin	Triple jump	7th
Men's	2001 Outdoor	William Montgomery	Long jump	6th
Men's	2002 Outdoor	William Montgomery	Long jump	7th
Women's	2005 Indoor	Cassie Ficken	3000 meters	7th
Women's	2006 Outdoor	Shareese Woods	200 meters	6th
Women's	2007 Indoor	Shareese Woods	200 meters	4th
Women's	2007 Outdoor	Shareese Woods	200 meters	6th
Men's	2016 Outdoor	Trey McRae	High jump	3rd
Women's	2017 Indoor	Victoria Merriweather	Weight throw	3rd
Women's	2017 Outdoor	Caroline Sang	10,000 meters	8th
Men's	2021 Outdoor	Terrell Adams	Discus throw	8th
Men's	2022 Outdoor	Justin Leaston	110 meters hurdles	7th
Women's	2024 Indoor	Riley Felts	Pole vault	2nd
Women's	2024 Outdoor	Riley Felts	Pole vault	2nd

== See also ==
- Category:Charlotte 49ers men's track and field athletes
- Category:Charlotte 49ers women's track and field athletes
