= Liberty Flames and Lady Flames track and field =

College track and field team in Virginia, US

- University: Liberty University
- Head coach: Lance Bingham
- Conference: C-USA
- Location: Lynchburg, Virginia
- Outdoor track: Matthes-Hopkins Track Complex
- Nickname: Flames and Lady Flames

The Liberty Flames and Lady Flames track and field team is the track and field program that represents Liberty University. The Flames and Lady Flames compete in NCAA Division I as a member of the Conference USA. The team is based in Lynchburg, Virginia, at the Matthes-Hopkins Track Complex.

The program is coached by Lance Bingham. The track and field program officially encompasses four teams because the NCAA considers men's and women's indoor track and field and outdoor track and field as separate sports.

Runner Sam Chelanga has won the most NCAA titles for the team, winning the 10,000 m and outdoor 5000 m in 2010 and 2011 respectively.

== Postseason ==
As of August 2025, a total of 14 men and 4 women have achieved individual first-team All-American status for the team at the Division I men's outdoor, women's outdoor, men's indoor, or women's indoor national championships (using the modern criteria of top-8 placing regardless of athlete nationality).

First team NCAA All-Americans
Team	Championships	Name	Event	Place	Ref.
Men's	1989 Outdoor	Henry Elliott	Decathlon	7th	
Men's	1994 Outdoor	Jacob Swinton	100 meters	7th	
Men's	1995 Outdoor	Ryan Werner	Decathlon	4th	
Men's	1996 Outdoor	Ryan Werner	Decathlon	8th	
Men's	2001 Indoor	Michael Decker	400 meters	5th	
Women's	2002 Indoor	Heather Sagan	Mile run	1st	
Women's	2002 Indoor	Andrea Wildrick	Pole vault	4th	
Women's	2002 Outdoor	Heather Sagan	1500 meters	2nd	
Women's	2002 Outdoor	Andrew Wildrick	Pole vault	2nd	
Men's	2005 Indoor	Josh McDougal	3000 meters	5th	
Men's	2006 Indoor	Josh McDougal	3000 meters	5th	
Men's	2006 Indoor	Josh McDougal	5000 meters	4th	
Men's	2007 Indoor	Josh McDougal	3000 meters	3rd	
Men's	2007 Indoor	Josh McDougal	5000 meters	8th	
Men's	2007 Outdoor	Josh McDougal	5000 meters	4th	
Men's	2007 Outdoor	Josh McDougal	10,000 meters	3rd	
Men's	2007 Outdoor	Brandon Hoskins	Decathlon	7th	
Men's	2008 Indoor	Josh McDougal	3000 meters	6th	
Men's	2008 Indoor	Josh McDougal	5000 meters	5th	
Men's	2008 Outdoor	Clendon Henderson	Discus throw	3rd	
Men's	2009 Indoor	Sam Chelanga	5000 meters	2nd	
Men's	2009 Outdoor	Sam Chelanga	10,000 meters	3rd	
Men's	2010 Indoor	Sam Chelanga	5000 meters	2nd	
Men's	2010 Outdoor	Sam Chelanga	5000 meters	2nd	
Men's	2010 Outdoor	Sam Chelanga	10,000 meters	1st	
Men's	2011 Indoor	Sam Chelanga	5000 meters	2nd	
Men's	2011 Outdoor	Sam Chelanga	5000 meters	1st	
Men's	2011 Outdoor	Sam Chelanga	10,000 meters	2nd	
Men's	2012 Outdoor	Kolby Shepherd	Pole vault	5th	
Women's	2016 Outdoor	Ednah Kurgat	5000 meters	4th	
Men's	2018 Indoor	Jovaine Atkinson	60 meters hurdles	4th	
Men's	2018 Outdoor	Markus Ballengee	Decathlon	7th	
Men's	2019 Indoor	Jhon Alejandro Perlaza	400 meters	6th	
Men's	2019 Outdoor	Jhon Alejandro Perlaza	400 meters	5th	
Men's	2019 Outdoor	Azaria Kirwa	10,000 meters	8th	
Men's	2023 Outdoor	Kevin Nedrick	Discus throw	5th	

== See also ==
- Category:Liberty Flames track and field athletes (3)
- Category:Liberty Lady Flames track and field athletes (1)
