= Leonard Byrd =

American sprinter

Personal information
- Born: March 17, 1975 (age 51) Fort Rucker, Alabama, United States

Sport
- Sport: Track and field
Medal record
Representing United States
Summer Universiade
Gold medal – first place	1995 Fukuoka	4x400m relay

Leonard Byrd (born March 17, 1975) is an American sprinter who specializes in the 400 metres. His personal best time is 44.45 seconds, achieved in May 2002 in Belém, Brazil. This was the fastest time of 2002.

In college, Byrd was an All-American for the UTSA Roadrunners track and field team.

He originally won the gold medal in the 4 × 400 metres relay at the 2001 World Championships in Edmonton, together with teammates Antonio Pettigrew, Derrick Brew and Angelo Taylor, but the team was disqualified when Antonio Pettigrew admitted to using performance-enhancing drugs. He also competed in the individual distance, but only reached the semi-final.

== Achievements ==
Year	Competition	Venue	Position	Notes
Representing the United States
2001	World Championships	Edmonton, Canada	Disqualified	4 × 400 m
2002	IAAF Grand Prix Final	Paris, France	3rd	400 m
