= Bradley Hauser =

American long-distance runner (born 1977)

Personal information
- Nickname: Brad
- Born: March 28, 1977 (age 49) Danville, Pennsylvania, U.S.

Sport
- Country: United States
- Sport: Athletics
- Event: 5000 metres

Bradley "Brad" Hauser (born March 28, 1977) is a retired American long-distance runner.

He finished fourteenth at the 1996 World Junior Championships and 21st at the 1999 World Championships, both in the 10,000 metres; and also finished fifteenth in the short race at the 2001 World Cross Country Championships. He also competed in the 5000 metres at the 2000 Summer Olympics without reaching the final.

Running for the Stanford Cardinal track and field team, Hauser won the 1998 and 1999 5000 meters at the NCAA Division I Indoor Track and Field Championships.

His personal best times were 7:51.20 minutes in the 3000 metres, achieved in February 2001 in Boston (indoor); 13:27.31 minutes in the 5000 metres, achieved in July 2000 in Sacramento; 27:58.02 minutes in the 10,000 metres, achieved in May 2002 in Palo Alto; and 2:14:15 hours in the marathon, achieved in September 2002 in Minneapolis.

Hauser was born in Danville, Pennsylvania.
