= FIU Panthers track and field =

College track and field team

- University: Florida International University
- Head coach: Ryan Heberling
- Conference: C-USA
- Location: Westchester, Florida
- Outdoor track: Tropical Park Track
- Nickname: Panthers
- Colors: Blue and gold

The FIU Panthers track and field team is the track and field program that represents Florida International University. The Panthers compete in NCAA Division I as a member of the Conference USA. The team is based in Westchester, Florida, at the Tropical Park Track.

The program is coached by Ryan Heberling. The track and field program officially encompasses four teams because the NCAA considers men's and women's indoor track and field and outdoor track and field as separate sports.

The Panthers track team is one of the few NCAA Division I teams to not have an on-campus track facility. Athletes commute to Tropical Park to train, about four miles away from the campus. Sheri-Ann Brooks won the team's first NCAA title over 200 meters outdoors in 2005.

== Postseason ==
As of August 2025, a total of 3 men and 8 women have achieved individual first-team All-American status for the team at the Division I men's outdoor, women's outdoor, men's indoor, or women's indoor national championships (using the modern criteria of top-8 placing regardless of athlete nationality).

First team NCAA All-Americans
Team	Championships	Name	Event	Place	Ref.
Women's	1996 Indoor	Shonda Swift	Triple jump	7th	
Women's	1997 Indoor	Shonda Swift	Triple jump	5th	
Women's	1997 Outdoor	Shonda Swift	Long jump	2nd	
Women's	1997 Outdoor	Shonda Swift	Triple jump	2nd	
Women's	1998 Indoor	Tayna Lawrence	200 meters	6th	
Men's	1998 Outdoor	Rod Davis	400 meters hurdles	6th	
Women's	1998 Outdoor	Tayna Lawrence	100 meters	4th	
Women's	1998 Outdoor	Tayna Lawrence	200 meters	5th	
Women's	1999 Indoor	Tayna Lawrence	60 meters	3rd	
Women's	1999 Indoor	Tayna Lawrence	200 meters	5th	
Men's	2000 Outdoor	Kevin Bateman	Javelin throw	7th	
Women's	2001 Indoor	Farah Jean-Pierre	High jump	3rd	
Women's	2005 Indoor	Sheri-Ann Brooks	60 meters	7th	
Women's	2005 Outdoor	Sheri-Ann Brooks	200 meters	1st	
Women's	2007 Outdoor	Naim Yisrael	400 meters hurdles	6th	
Men's	2008 Indoor	Ronald Forbes	60 meters hurdles	3rd	
Men's	2008 Outdoor	Ronald Forbes	110 meters hurdles	8th	
Women's	2018 Indoor	Clarissa Cutliff	High jump	5th	
Women's	2022 Outdoor	Rhema Otabor	Javelin throw	4th	
Women's	2025 Outdoor	Michaëlle Valentin	Discus throw	8th	

== See also ==
- Category:FIU Panthers men's track and field athletes (3)
- Category:FIU Panthers women's track and field athletes (5)
