= Sydney Vaught =

American athlete (born 2003)

Personal information
- Nationality: United States
- Born: Sydney Thorvaldson; 23 February 2003 (age 23)

Sport
- Sport: Athletics
- Event: Long-distance running

Sydney Vaught (née Thorvaldson born 7 March 2003) is an American long-distance runner. She won the 10,000 metres title at the 2026 USA Outdoor Track and Field Championships.

== Biography ==
From Rawlins, Wyoming, Thorvaldson was a successful high school athlete and was named the 2020-21 Gatorade National Girls Cross Country Runner of the Year. In her high school career, she won six Gatorade Wyoming Player of the Year awards, never losing a cross-country or track race in Wyoming. In cross country, she set meet records at the Northwest Nike Cross regional and XC Meet of Champions National Invitational, and on the track set Wyoming high school records at distances from the 800 metres, to the mile run and two-mile run. She was educated at Rawlins High School before attending the University of Arkansas.

Competing at the 2024 SEC Indoor Championships, she set a meeting record over 5000 metres of 15:42.45. In February 2026, running under her married name Sydney Vaught, she broke the SEC meet record in the 5000 m again, front running to win by 9.61 seconds, with a time of 15:02.52. It was the ninth-fastest time in NCAA history, and also a facility record. That year, having won four all-American honours for Arkansas in her college career, including two top-15 performances at the NCAA cross country championships, and helping Arkansas win the 2026 NCAA Indoor Championships, she signed a professional contract with sports brand Nike.

On 4 July 2026, Vaught was the top American finisher at the Peachtree Road Race over 10k, running 32:18. On 23 July, she won the 10,000 metres title at the 2026 USA Outdoor Track and Field Championships in New York ahead of Katie Izzo, having taken control of a slow race by running 15:21 for the second 5km.

== Personal life ==
She married Brody Vaught, a professional rodeo cowboy, in East Texas in October 2025, with the couple later living in Missouri.
