= 5000 meters at the NCAA Division I Indoor Track and Field Championships =

The 5000 meters or its imperial 3 miles equivalent have been contested at the NCAA Division I Indoor Track and Field Championships since 1974. It is the longest race on the NCAA indoor track program. The imperial distance was contested until 1982. The distance was not contested from 1983 to 1988, and then the metric 5000 meters was run since 1989. Hand timing was used until 1975, while starting in 1976 fully automatic timing was used. In 1986 and 1987, the 1/10-mile track that the races were run on was 25 inches (640 mm) per lap short, making the actual race distance less than 5000 meters those years.

== Winners ==
Key
y=yards
A=Altitude assisted

Women's 5000 m winners
Year	Athlete	Team	Time
1989	Jackie Goodman	Oklahoma State Cowgirls	15:52.77
1990	Valerie McGovern	Kentucky Wildcats	15:48.17
1991	Sonia O'Sullivan	Villanova Wildcats	15:49.46
1992	Tracy Dahl	Iowa Hawkeyes	15:56.27
1993	Tracy Dahl	Iowa Hawkeyes	15:49.52
1994	Brenda Sleeuwenhoek	Arizona Wildcats	16:46.54 (Note: Race was actually 5200 metres due to a race official miscounting laps.)
1995	Jen Rhines	Villanova Wildcats	15:41.12
1996	Marie McMahon	Providence Friars	15:42.71
1997	Amy Skieresz	Arizona Wildcats	15:39.75
1998	Amy Skieresz	Arizona Wildcats	15:54.58
1999	Leigh Daniel	Texas Tech Red Raiders	16:01.11
2000	Amy Yoder	Arkansas Razorbacks	15:46.89
2001	Jodie Hughes	Colorado Buffaloes	16:08.61
2002	Siri Alfheim	Oklahoma State Cowgirls	16:12.28
2003	Sara Gorton	Colorado Buffaloes	15:39.25
2004	Kim Smith	Providence Friars	15:14.18
2005	Ida Nilsson	Northern Arizona Lumberjacks	15:50.20
2006	Amy Cragg	Arizona State Sun Devils	15:51.63
2007	Sally Kipyego	Texas Tech Red Raiders	15:27.42
2008	Sally Kipyego	Texas Tech Red Raiders	15:31.91
2009	Sally Kipyego	Texas Tech Red Raiders	15:51.14
2010	Lisa Koll	Iowa State Cyclones	15:39.65
2011	Jackie Areson	Tennessee Volunteers	16:04.16
2012	Betsy Saina	Iowa State Cyclones	15:38.83
2013	Abbey Cooper	Dartmouth Big Green	15:28.11
2014	Abbey Cooper	Dartmouth Big Green	16:20.39 A
2015	Emily Sisson	Providence Friars	15:32.15
2016	Molly Seidel	Notre Dame Fighting Irish	15:15.21
2017	Karissa Schweizer	Missouri Tigers	15:19.14
2018	Karissa Schweizer	Missouri Tigers	15:43.23
2019	Alicia Monson	Wisconsin Badgers	15:31.26
2021	Joyce Kimeli	Auburn Tigers	15:48.98
2022	Courtney Wayment	BYU Cougars	15:30.17
2023	Katelyn Tuohy	NC State Wolfpack	16:09.65 A
2024	Parker Valby	Florida Gators	14:52.79
2025	(Kenya) Doris Lemngole	Alabama Crimson Tide	15:05.93
2026	Jane Hedengren	BYU Cougars	15:00.12

Men's 5000 m / 3 mi winners
Year	Athlete	Team	Time
1974	John Ngeno (KEN)	Wash St	13:20.8 y
1975	John Ngeno (KEN)	Wash St	13:14.4 y
1976	John Ngeno (KEN)	Wash St	13:20.34 y
1977	Luis Hernández (MEX)	Brigham Y	13:20.55 y
1978	John Treacy (IRL)	Providence	13:10.20 y
1979	Mike Musyoki (KEN)	UTEP	13:21.64 y
1980	Solomon Chebor (KEN)	FDU-Teaneck	13:20.94 y
1981	Mike Musyoki (KEN)	UTEP	13:25.03 y
1982	Gabriel Kamau (KEN)	UTEP	13:07.81 y
1989	John Scherer	Michigan	14:18.05
1990	Jonah Koech (KEN)	Iowa St	13:37.94
1991	Jonah Koech (KEN)	Iowa St	13:36.64
1992	Jon Brown (GBR)	Iowa St	13:42.93
1993	Jonah Koech (KEN)	Iowa St	13:47.18
1994	Jason Bunston	Arkansas	13:48.07
1995	Mark Carroll (IRL)	Providence	13:55.15
1996	Jason Casiano	Wisconsin	13:50.08
1997	Mebrahtom Keflezighi	UCLA	13:52.72
1998	Brad Hauser	Stanford	13:58.50
1999	Brad Hauser	Stanford	13:52.79
2000	David Kimani (KEN)	South Alabama	13:52.58
2001	David Kimani (KEN)	Alabama	13:42.32
2002	Alistair Cragg (RSA)	Arkansas	13:49.80
2003	Alistair Cragg (IRL)	Arkansas	13:28.93
2004	Alistair Cragg (IRL)	Arkansas	13:39.63
2005	Ian Dobson	Stanford	13:43.36
2006	Josphat Boit (KEN)	Arkansas	13:49.93
2007	Chris Solinsky	Wisconsin Badgers	13:38.61
2008	Shadrack Songok	Texas A&M–Corpus Christi Islanders	13:51.26
2009	Galen Rupp	Oregon Ducks	13:41.45
2010	David Mcneill	Northern Arizona Lumberjacks	13:36.41
2011	Leonard Korir	Iona Gaels	13:26.01
2012	Lawi Lalang	Arizona Wildcats	13:25.11
2013	Kennedy Kithuka	Texas Tech Red Raiders	13:25.38
2014	Edward Cheserek	Oregon Ducks	13:46.67 A
2015	Eric Jenkins	Oregon Ducks	13:48.36
2016	Edward Cheserek	Oregon Ducks	13:47.89
2017	Edward Cheserek	Oregon Ducks	13:41.20
2018	Justyn Knight	Syracuse Orange	14:14.47
2019	Morgan McDonald	Wisconsin Badgers	13:41.76
2021	Wesley Kiptoo	Iowa State Cyclones	13:23.77 MR
2022	Abdihamid Nur	Northern Arizona Lumberjacks	13:19.01
2023	Dylan Jacobs	Tennessee Volunteers	13:37.59 A
2024	Nico Young	Northern Arizona Lumberjacks	13:25.29
2025	Brian Musau (KEN)	Oklahoma State Cowboys	13:11.34
2026	Habtom Samuel (ERI)	New Mexico Lobos	13:36.58
