= 10,000 meters at the NCAA Division I Outdoor Track and Field Championships =

This is a list of the NCAA outdoor champions in the 10,000 meters and its imperial equivalent 6 mile run. The imperial distance was contested until 1975, except for during Olympic years since 1932. Metrication occurred in 1976, so all subsequent championships were at the metric distance. Hand timing was used until 1973, while starting in 1974 fully automatic timing was used. The women's race started in 1982.

== Winners ==
Key
A=Altitude assisted
y=yards

Women's 10,000 m winners
| Year | Athlete | Team | Time |
|---|---|---|---|
| 1982 | Kim Schnurpfeil | Stanford | 33:36.51 |
| 1983 | Betty Springs | North Carolina St | 33:01.0 |
| 1984 | Kathy Hayes | Oregon | 32:43.8 |
| 1985 | Nan Doak | Iowa | 33:03.0 |
| 1986 | Stephanie Herbst | Wisconsin | 32:32.8 |
| 1987 | Patty Murray | Western Illinois | 33:28.3 |
| 1988 | Sylvia Mosqueda | Cal St Los Angeles | 32:28.6 |
| 1989 | Jackie Goodman (NZL) | Oklahoma St | 33:42.35 |
| 1990 | Janet Haskin | Kansas St | 33:49.7 |
| 1991 | Jamie Park | Arkansas | 33:15.1 |
| 1992 | Kim Saddic | George Mason | 34:39.9 |
| 1993 | Carole Zajac | Villanova | 34:18.1 |
| 1994 | Carole Zajac | Villanova | 33:32.4 |
| 1995 | Katie Swords (AUS) | Southern Meth | 34:28.5 |
| 1996 | Katie Swords (AUS) | Southern Meth | 32:56.6 |
| 1997 | Amy Skieresz | Arizona | 33:14.2 |
| 1998 | Amy Skieresz | Arizona | 33:04.1 |
| 1999 | Leigh Daniel | Texas Tech | 34:01.6 |
| 2000 | Tara Rohatinsky | Brigham Young | 33:49.2 |
| 2001 | Amy Yoder-Begley | Arkansas | 34:00.0 |
| 2002 | Kristin Price | North Carolina St | 34:26.6 |
| 2003 | Alicia Craig | Stanford | 32:40.0 |
| 2004 | Alicia Craig | Stanford | 33:58.3 |
| 2005 | Sara Slattery | Colorado | 33:02.2 |
| 2006 | Victoria Jackson | Arizona St | 32:54.7 |
| 2007 | Sally Kipyego | Texas Tech | 32:55.67 |
| 2008 | Lisa Uhl | Iowa State | 32:44.95 |
| 2009 | Danette Doetzel (CAN) | Providence | 33:25.71 |
| 2010 | Lisa Koll | Iowa State | 32:49.35 |
| 2011 | Juliet Bottorff | Duke | 34:25.86 |
| 2012 | Natosha Rogers | Texas A&M | 32:41.63 |
| 2013 | Betsy Saina | Iowa State | 33:08.85 |
| 2014 | Emma Bates | Boise State | 32:32.35 |
| 2015 | Molly Seidel | Notre Dame | 33:18.37 |
| 2016 | Dominique Scott (RSA) | Arkansas | 32:35.69 |
| 2017 | Charlotte Taylor (GBR) | San Francisco | 32:38.57 |
| 2018 | Sharon Lokedi (KEN) | Kansas | 32:09.20 |
| 2019 | Weini Kelati | New Mexico | 33:10.84 |
| 2021 | Carmela Cardama Báez (ESP) | Oregon | 32:16.13 |
| 2022 | Mercy Chelangat (KEN) | Alabama | 32:37.08 |
| 2023 | Everlyn Kemboi (KEN) | Utah Valley | 32:39.08 |
| 2024 | Parker Valby (USA) | Florida Gators | 31:46.09 |
| 2025 | Pamela Kosgei (KEN) | New Mexico Lobos | 31:17.82 |
| 2026 | Mercyline Kirwa (KEN) | Iowa State Cyclones | 31:54.88 |

Men's 10,000 m / 6 mi winners
| Year | Name, (Country) | Team | Time |
|---|---|---|---|
| 1948 | Robert Black | Rhode Island | 32:13.5 |
| 1949 | not held | | |
| 1950 | not held | | |
| 1951 | not held | | |
| 1952 | Walt Deike | Wisconsin | 32:25.1 |
| 1953 | not held | | |
| 1954 | not held | | |
| 1955 | not held | | |
| 1956 | Selwyn Jones | Michigan St | 31:15.3 |
| 1957 | not held | | |
| 1958 | not held | | |
| 1959 | not held | | |
| 1960 | not held | | |
| 1961 | not held | | |
| 1962 | not held | | |
| 1963 | Julio Marín Costa Rica | Southern Cal | 30:32.9Ay |
| 1964 | Danny Murphy | San Jose St | 29:37.8 |
| 1965 | Doug Brown | Montana | 27:59.2y |
| 1966 | Gerry Lindgren | Wash St | 28:07.0y |
| 1967 | Gerry Lindgren | Wash St | 28:44.0Ay |
| 1968 | Gerry Lindgren | Wash St | 29:41.0 |
| 1969 | Frank Shorter | Yale | 29:00.2y |
| 1970 | Bob Bertelsen | Ohio | 27:57.5y |
| 1971 | Garry Bjorklund | Minnesota | 27:43.1y |
| 1972 | John Halberstadt South Africa | Oklahoma St | 28:50.4 |
| 1973 | Charles Maguire | Penn St | 28:19.3y |
| 1974 | John Ngeno Kenya | Wash St | 28:14.46y |
| 1975 | John Ngeno Kenya | Wash St | 28:20.66Ay |
| 1976 | John Ngeno Kenya | Wash St | 28:22.7 |
| 1977 | Samson Kimobwa Kenya | Wash St | 28:10.3 |
| 1978 | Mike Musyoki Kenya | UTEP | 28:30.9 |
| 1979 | Suleiman Nyambui Tanzania | UTEP | 28:01.3 |
| 1980 | Suleiman Nyambui Tanzania | UTEP | 29:21.8 |
| 1981 | Suleiman Nyambui Tanzania | UTEP | 28:34.2 |
| 1982 | Suleiman Nyambui Tanzania | UTEP | 29:03.54A |
| 1983 | Gidamis Shahanga Tanzania | UTEP | 29:10.3 |
| 1984 | Ed Eyestone | Brigham Young | 28:05.3 |
| 1985 | Ed Eyestone | Brigham Young | 28:46.9 |
| 1986 | Keith Hanson | Marquette | 29:02.7 |
| 1987 | Joe Falcon | Arkansas | 29:10.7 |
| 1988 | John Scherer | Michigan | 28:50.4 |
| 1989 | John Scherer | Michigan | 29:48.95A |
| 1990 | Shannon Butler | Montana St | 28:38.4 |
| 1991 | Terry Thornton United Kingdom | Louisiana St | 28:25.9 |
| 1992 | Sean Dollman Ireland | Western Kentucky | 29:49.5 |
| 1993 | Jonah Koech Kenya | Iowa St | 28:28.7 |
| 1994 | Teddy Mitchell | Arkansas | 29:39.5 |
| 1995 | Godfrey Siamusiye Zambia | Arkansas | 28:59.6 |
| 1996 | Godfrey Siamusiye Zambia | Arkansas | 28:56.4 |
| 1997 | Mebrahtom Keflezighi Eritrea | UCLA | 28:51.2 |
| 1998 | Brad Hauser | Stanford | 28:31.3 |
| 1999 | Nathan Nutter | Stanford | 29:12.0 |
| 2000 | Brad Hauser | Stanford | 30:38.6 |
| 2001 | Ryan Shay | Notre Dame | 29:05.4 |
| 2002 | Boaz Cheboiywo Kenya | Eastern Mich | 28:32.1 |
| 2003 | Daniel Lincoln | Arkansas | 28:20.2 |
| 2004 | Alistair Cragg Ireland | Arkansas | 29:22.4 |
| 2005 | Robert Cheseret Kenya | Arizona | 28:20.1 |
| 2006 | Josphat Boit Kenya | Arkansas | 28:37.6 |
| 2008 | Shadrack Songok Kenya | Texas A&M–Corpus Christi | 28:46.69 |
| 2009 | Galen Rupp | Oregon | 28:21.45 |
| 2010 | Sam Chelanga | Liberty | 28:37.40 |
| 2011 | Leonard Korir | Iona | 28:07.63 |
| 2012 | Cameron Levins Canada | Southern Utah | 28:07.14 |
| 2013 | Lawi Lalang | Arizona | 29:29.65 |
| 2014 | Edward Cheserek | Oregon | 28:30.18 |
| 2015 | Edward Cheserek | Oregon | 28:58.92 |
| 2016 | Edward Cheserek | Oregon | 29:09.57 |
| 2017 | Marc Scott | Tulsa | 29:01.54 |
| 2018 | Ben Flanagan | Michigan | 28:34.53 |
| 2019 | Clayton Young | Brigham Young | 29:16.60 |
| 2020 | not held | | |
| 2021 | Patrick Dever | Tulsa | 27:41.87 |
| 2022 | Dylan Jacobs | University of Notre Dame | 28:12.32 |
| 2023 | Ky Robinson | Stanford | 28:10.96 |
| 2024 | Habtom Samuel (ERI) | New Mexico Lobos | 28:07.82 |
| 2025 | Ishmael Kipkurui (KEN) | New Mexico Lobos | 29:07.70 |
| 2026 | Habtom Samuel (ERI) | New Mexico Lobos | 27:51.31 |
