= 1999 NCAA Division I Outdoor Track and Field Championships =

- Men's Champion: Arkansas (9th title); Women's Champion: Texas (3rd title)
- Edition: 78th Men; 18th Women
- Dates: June 2−5, 1999
- Host city: Boise, Idaho; Boise State University
- Venue: Bronco Stadium
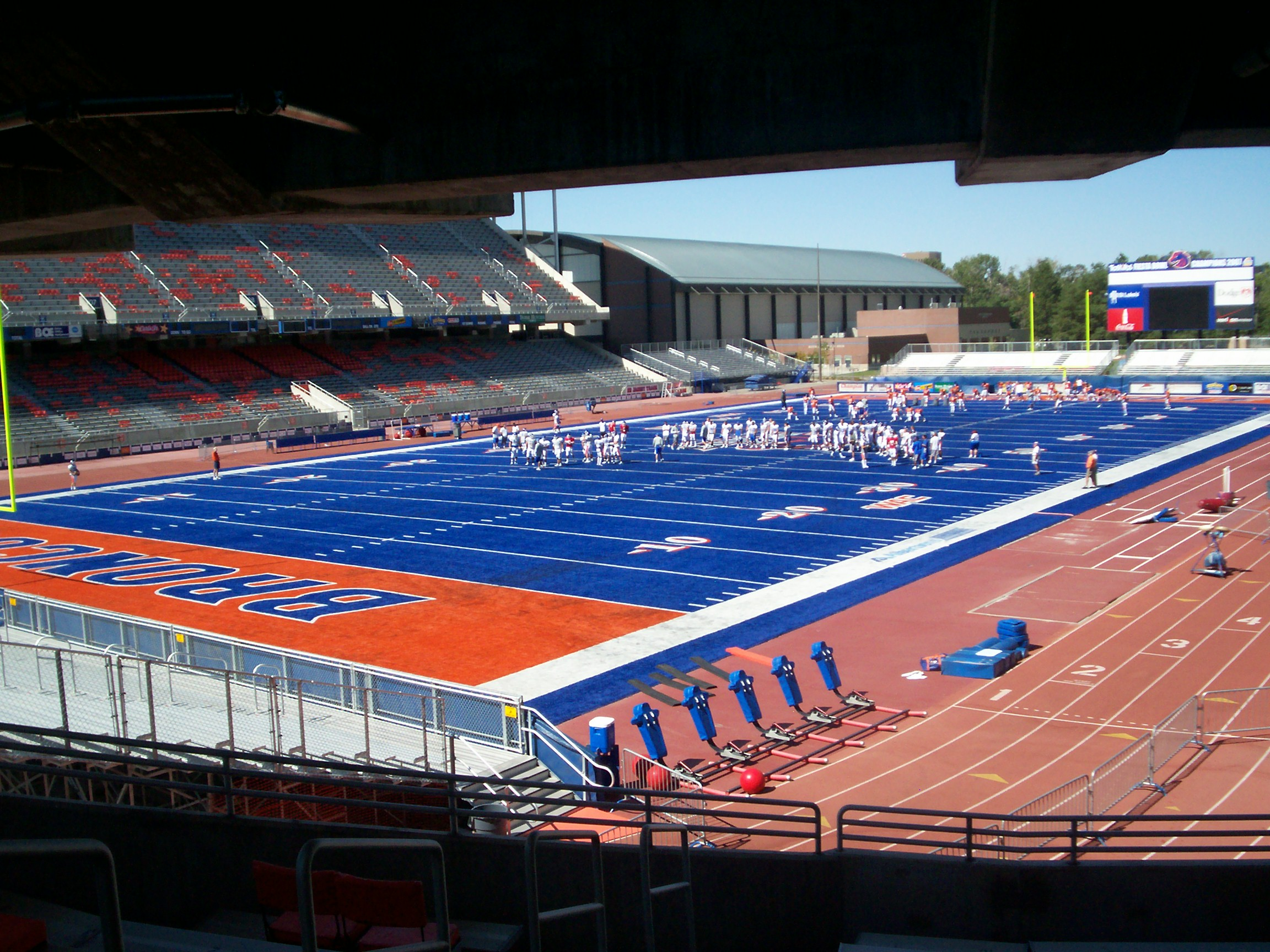
- Level: Collegiate Division I
- Type: Outdoor

The 1999 NCAA Division I Outdoor Track and Field Championships were held June 2−5 at Bronco Stadium at Boise State University in Boise, Idaho. It determined the individual and team national champions of men's and women's collegiate Division I outdoor track and field events in the United States.

These were the 78th annual men's championships and the 18th annual women's championships. Favored Arkansas topped the men's team standings for an eighth consecutive year, and Texas finished atop the women's team standings.

Boise had previously hosted five years earlier; with a final day attendance of 8,455 on Saturday, the four-day total in 1999 was 26,596.

== Team results ==
- Note: Top 10 only
- Full results

=== Men's standings ===
Rank	Team	Points
1st place, gold medalist(s)	Arkansas	59
2nd place, silver medalist(s)	Stanford	52
3rd place, bronze medalist(s)	Southern Methodist	49
4	Auburn	40
5	USC	33
6	South Carolina	30
6	Texas	30
8	Texas-El Paso	25
9	Florida	24
9	Louisiana State	24

=== Women's standings ===
Rank	Team	Points
1st place, gold medalist(s)	Texas	62
2nd place, silver medalist(s)	UCLA	60
3rd place, bronze medalist(s)	USC	58
4	Georgia	37
5	Louisiana State	32
6	Southern Methodist	29
7	South Carolina	24
8	Brigham Young	23
8	Villanova	23
10	Baylor	20
10	Pittsburgh	20

== Men's events ==
=== 100 meters ===
- Final results shown, not prelims

Rank	Name	University	Time	Notes
1st place, gold medalist(s)	Leonard Myles-Mills Ghana	Brigham Young	9.98	
2nd place, silver medalist(s)	John Capel	Florida	10.03	
3rd place, bronze medalist(s)	Virgil Maddox	Oral Roberts	10.12	
4	Daymon Carroll	Florida	10.20	
5	Nathanael Esprit	Texas	10.20	
6	Coby Miller	Auburn	10.21	
7	Kaaron Conwright	Cal Poly	10.25	
8	Terrence Trammell	South Carolina	10.33	

=== 200 meters ===
- Final results shown, not prelims

Rank	Name	University	Time	Notes
1st place, gold medalist(s)	John Capel	Florida	19.87	
2nd place, silver medalist(s)	Coby Miller	Auburn	20.04	
3rd place, bronze medalist(s)	Charles Lee	USC	20.53	
4	Corey Nelson	Boise State	20.57	
5	Jeremy Taylor	Alabama	20.64	
6	Shawn Crawford	Clemson	20.75	
7	Kaaron Conwright	Cal Poly	20.82	
-	Bryan Howard	Texas Christian	DNF	

=== 400 meters ===
- Final results shown, not prelims

Rank	Name	University	Time	Notes
1st place, gold medalist(s)	Clement Chukwu Nigeria	Eastern Michigan	44.79	
2nd place, silver medalist(s)	Derrick Brew	LSU	45.04	
3rd place, bronze medalist(s)	Jerome Davis	USC	45.06	
4	Avard Moncur Bahamas	Auburn	45.35	
5	Ato Modibo Trinidad and Tobago	Clemson	45.37	
6	Julius Edwards	Auburn	45.99	
7	Corey Nelson	Boise State	46.12	
8	Tony Berrian	Arizona State	46.23	

=== 800 meters ===
- Final results shown, not prelims

Rank	Name	University	Time	Notes
1st place, gold medalist(s)	Derrick Peterson	Missouri	1:46.97	
2nd place, silver medalist(s)	Patrick Nduwimana Burundi	Arizona	1:47.22	
3rd place, bronze medalist(s)	Roman Oravec Czech Republic	Southern Methodist	1:47.66	
4	Bobby True Liberia	Illinois	1:47.93	
5	James Karanu Kenya	Arkansas	1:47.96	
6	Trinity Gray	Brown	1:48.56	
7	Ian Roberts Guyana	St. John's	1:49.22	
8	Davidson Gill	Clemson	1:49.95	

=== 1500 meters ===
- Final results shown, not prelims

Rank	Name	University	Time	Notes
1st place, gold medalist(s)	Clyde Colenso	Southern Methodist	3:47.54	
2nd place, silver medalist(s)	Seneca Lassiter	Arkansas	3:47.67	
3rd place, bronze medalist(s)	Bryan Berryhill	Colorado State	3:48.21	
4	Bernard Lagat	Washington State	3:48.88	
5	Sharif Karie	Arkansas	3:50.18	
6	Jason Long	James Madison	3:50.63	
7	Jake Maas	Stanford	3:51.56	
8	Sam Gabremariam	Georgetown	3:51.85	
9	Joel Atwater	Weber State	3:52.30	
10	Bryan Lindsay	Brigham Young	3:52.63	

=== 3000 meters steeplechase ===
- Final results shown, not prelims

Rank	Name	University	Time	Notes
1st place, gold medalist(s)	Matt Kerr	Arkansas	8:44.29	
2nd place, silver medalist(s)	Carlos Suarez-Gonzales Spain	Texas-El Paso	8:45.14	
3rd place, bronze medalist(s)	Adam Batliner	Colorado	8:46.33	
4	Tom Reese	Colorado	8:47.29	
5	Chuck Sloan	Oklahoma State	8:49.76	
6	Anthony Famiglietti	Tennessee	8:50.11	
7	Travis Armstrong	Boise State	8:52.02	
8	Tom Chorny	Indiana	8:54.17	
9	Billy Herman	Northern Arizona	8:55.17	
10	Todd Davis	Portland	8:55.45	

=== 5000 meters ===
- Final results shown, not prelims

Rank	Name	University	Time	Notes
1st place, gold medalist(s)	Bernard Lagat	Washington State	14:01.09	
2nd place, silver medalist(s)	Brad Hauser	Stanford	14:01.82	
3rd place, bronze medalist(s)	Tim Broe	Alabama	14:04.15	
4	Mike Power Australia	Arkansas	14:06.91	
5	Brent Hauser	Stanford	14:08.74	
6	Matthew Lane	William & Mary	14:10.71	
7	Steven Fein	Oregon	14:11.70	
8	Jason Balkman	Stanford	14:11.73	
9	Abdi Abdirahman	Arizona	14:14.15	
10	John Schoenfelder	Wisconsin	14:15.04	

=== 10,000 meters ===
- Final results shown, not prelims

Rank	Name	University	Time	Notes
1st place, gold medalist(s)	Nathan Nutter	Stanford	29:11.96	
2nd place, silver medalist(s)	Jason Balkman	Stanford	29:12.91	
3rd place, bronze medalist(s)	Brent Hauser	Stanford	29:14.07	
4	Nolan Swanson	Wake Forest	29:21.16	
5	Jim Jurcevich	Michigan State	29:25.14	
6	Abdi Abdirahman	Arizona	29:34.03	
7	Ryan Shay	Notre Dame	29:55.78	
8	Chris Bailey	Illinois State	30:00.17	
9	Richie Brinker	Central Michigan	30:01.93	
10	Steve Schell	Michigan State	30:29.76	

=== 110 meters hurdles ===
- Final results shown, not prelims

Rank	Name	University	Time	Notes
1st place, gold medalist(s)	Terrence Trammell	South Carolina	13.45	
2nd place, silver medalist(s)	Dawane Wallace	Tennessee	13.57	
3rd place, bronze medalist(s)	Greg Richardson	Central Michigan	13.59	
4	Ron Bramlett	Middle Tennessee State	13.82	
5	Adrian Woodley Canada	Syracuse	13.83	
6	Aubrey Herring	Indiana State	13.83	
7	William Erese Nigeria	USC	13.88	
8	Kris Allen	Texas A&M	13.93	

=== 400 meters hurdles ===
Rank	Name	University	Time	Notes
1st place, gold medalist(s)	Bayano Kamani Panama	Baylor	48.68	
2nd place, silver medalist(s)	Corey Murdock	Utah State	49.34	
3rd place, bronze medalist(s)	James Carter	Hampton	49.45	
4	Jesse Allen	Duke	49.90	
5	Sam Glover	Arkansas	50.39	
6	Michael Smith	Baylor	50.51	
7	Ken Garrett	Georgia	50.69	
8	Adrian Mann	Florida	51.47	

=== 4x100-meter relay ===
- Final results shown, not prelims

Rank	University	Time	Notes
1st place, gold medalist(s)	South Carolina	38.92	
2nd place, silver medalist(s)	USC	39.15	
3rd place, bronze medalist(s)	Brigham Young	39.28	
4	North Carolina	39.48	
5	Clemson	39.63	
6	Texas A&M	39.69	
7	Texas-El Paso	39.93	
-	Florida	DQ	

=== 4x400-meter relay ===
- Final results shown, not prelims

Rank	University	Time	Notes
1st place, gold medalist(s)	UCLA	3:02.12	
2nd place, silver medalist(s)	Auburn	3:02.19	
3rd place, bronze medalist(s)	Baylor	3:02.73	
4	Iowa	3:03.41	
5	Georgia Tech	3:03.43	
6	Arizona State	3:06.74	
7	USC	3:11.26	
-	Clemson	DNF	

=== High Jump ===
- Only top eight final results shown; no prelims are listed

Rank	Name	University	Height	Notes
1st place, gold medalist(s)	Mark Boswell	Texas	2.33 m (7 ft 7 1/2 in)	
2nd place, silver medalist(s)	Staffan Strand	Minnesota	2.30 m (7 ft 6 1/2 in)	
3rd place, bronze medalist(s)	Kenny Evans	Arkansas	2.27 m (7 ft 5 1/4 in)	
4	Charles Clinger	Weber State	2.27 m (7 ft 5 1/4 in)	
5	Tora Harris	Princeton	2.24 m (7 ft 4 in)	
6	Shane Lavy	Nebraska	2.21 m (7 ft 3 in)	
7	Marc Chenn	Brigham Young	2.21 m (7 ft 3 in)	
8	Ronald Nelson	Prairie View A&M	2.21 m (7 ft 3 in)	
9	Lavar Miller	Arkansas	2.21 m (7 ft 3 in)	
10	Jason Boness	Northern Iowa	2.21 m (7 ft 3 in)	

=== Pole Vault ===
- Only top eight final results shown; no prelims are listed

Rank	Name	University	Distance	Notes
1st place, gold medalist(s)	Jacob Davis	Texas	5.56 m (18 ft 2 3/4 in)	
2nd place, silver medalist(s)	Toby Stevenson	Stanford	5.45 m (17 ft 10 1/2 in)	
3rd place, bronze medalist(s)	Borya Celentano	Long Beach State	5.45 m (17 ft 10 1/2 in)	
4	Jake Pauli	Northern Iowa	5.45 m (17 ft 10 1/2 in)	
5	Jeff Hansen	Brigham Young	5.45 m (17 ft 10 1/2 in)	
6	Jim Davis	Fresno State	5.30 m (17 ft 4 1/2 in)	
7	Russell Johnson	Tennessee	5.15 m (16 ft 10 3/4 in)	
7	Dennis Kholev	USC	5.15 m (16 ft 10 3/4 in)	
7	Jeff Dutoit	Arizona	5.15 m (16 ft 10 3/4 in)	
10	Brad Pickett	Cal Poly	5.15 m (16 ft 10 3/4 in)	

All other finalists; No Height

=== Long Jump ===
- Only top eight final results shown; no prelims are listed

Rank	Name	University	Distance	Wind	Notes
1st place, gold medalist(s)	Melvin Lister	Arkansas	8.18 m (26 ft 10 in)	+1.3	
2nd place, silver medalist(s)	Frankie Young	Indiana State	8.18 m (26 ft 10 in)	+4.6	
3rd place, bronze medalist(s)	Savante Stringfellow	Mississippi	8.12 m (26 ft 7 1/2 in)	+2.0	
4	Dwight Phillips	Arizona State	7.92 m (25 ft 11 3/4 in)	+1.6	
5	Marcell Williams	Stephen F. Austin	7.86 m (25 ft 9 1/4 in)	+2.0	
6	George Audu	Penn State	7.82 m (25 ft 7 3/4 in)	-0.1	
7	Babatunde Ridley	Illinois	7.81 m (25 ft 7 1/4 in)	+2.1	
8	Kai Maull	Clemson	7.80 m (25 ft 7 in)	+2.3	
9	Maurice Lewis	Florida	7.78 m (25 ft 6 1/4 in)	-0.6	
10	Chris Hercules	Texas	7.77 m (25 ft 5 3/4 in)	+1.5	

=== Triple Jump ===
- Only top eight final results shown; no prelims are listed

Rank	Name	University	Distance	Wind	Notes
1st place, gold medalist(s)	LeVar Anderson	LSU	17.12 m (56 ft 2 in)w	+3.7	
2nd place, silver medalist(s)	Demetrius Murray	Washington State	16.46 m (54 ft 0 in)w	+4.5	
3rd place, bronze medalist(s)	Chris Hercules	Texas	16.43 m (53 ft 10 3/4 in)w	+2.7	
4	Dwight Phillips	Arizona State	16.41 m (53 ft 10 in)	+2.0	
5	Melvin Lister	Arkansas	16.39 m (53 ft 9 1/4 in)w	+3.3	
6	Samuel Okantey	Syracuse	16.39 m (53 ft 9 1/4 in)	+1.2	
7	Marcus Thomas	LSU	16.30 m (53 ft 5 1/2 in)	+1.0	
8	Kenta Bell	Northwestern State	16.28 m (53 ft 4 3/4 in)	+1.8	
9	Lenton Herring	Wisconsin	16.18 m (53 ft 1 in)w	+4.5	
10	Kedjeloba Mambo	USC	16.08 m (52 ft 9 in)	-0.6	

=== Shot Put ===
- Only top eight final results shown; no prelims are listed

Rank	Name	University	Distance	Notes
1st place, gold medalist(s)	Janus Robberts South Africa	Southern Methodist	20.10 m (65 ft 11 1/4 in)	
2nd place, silver medalist(s)	Brad Snyder Canada	South Carolina	19.77 m (64 ft 10 1/4 in)	
3rd place, bronze medalist(s)	Joachim Olsen Denmark	Idaho	19.35 m (63 ft 5 3/4 in)	
4	Jamie Beyer	Iowa State	19.33 m (63 ft 5 in)	
5	Marcus Clavelle	Arkansas	19.27 m (63 ft 2 1/2 in)	
6	John Davis	Houston	19.00 m (62 ft 4 in)	
7	Tepa Reinikainen Finland	Texas-El Paso	18.93 m (62 ft 1 1/4 in)	
8	Wade Tift	UCLA	18.88 m (61 ft 11 1/4 in)	
9	Andy Sverchek	Cal Poly	18.72 m (61 ft 5 in)	
10	Allen Bradd	North Carolina	18.59 m (60 ft 11 3/4 in)	

=== Discus ===
- Only top eight final results shown; no prelims are listed

Rank	Name	University	Distance	Notes
1st place, gold medalist(s)	Gábor Máté Hungary	Auburn	61.60 m (202 ft 1 in)	
2nd place, silver medalist(s)	Janus Robberts South Africa	Southern Methodist	60.62 m (198 ft 10 1/2 in)	
3rd place, bronze medalist(s)	Nick Petrucci	Northern Arizona	59.57 m (195 ft 5 1/4 in)	
4	John Davis	Houston	59.41 m (194 ft 10 3/4 in)	
5	Luke Sullivan	UCLA	59.37 m (194 ft 9 1/4 in)	
6	Reedus Thurmond	Auburn	59.31 m (194 ft 7 in)	
7	Mark Simmons	Southern Methodist	59.07 m (193 ft 9 1/2 in)	
8	James Dennis	Louisville	58.89 m (193 ft 2 1/2 in)	
9	Brad Snyder Canada	South Carolina	58.65 m (192 ft 5 in)	
10	Jamie Beyer	Iowa State	57.26 m (187 ft 10 1/4 in)	

=== Hammer Throw ===
- Only top eight final results shown; no prelims are listed

Rank	Name	University	Distance	Notes
1st place, gold medalist(s)	Andras Haklits Croatia	Northeast Louisiana	74.09 m (243 ft 3/4 in)	
2nd place, silver medalist(s)	Norbert Horvath Hungary	USC	73.75 m (241 ft 11 1/2 in)	
3rd place, bronze medalist(s)	Libor Charfreitag Slovakia	Southern Methodist	73.10 m (239 ft 9 3/4 in)	
4	Adam Connolly	Stanford	71.96 m (236 ft 1 in)	
5	James Parker	Utah State	71.24 m (233 ft 8 1/2 in)	
6	Ilmari Verho	Texas-El Paso	68.08 m (223 ft 4 1/4 in)	
7	Matt Kavanagh	Kentucky	67.46 m (221 ft 3 3/4 in)	
8	Bert Sorin	South Carolina	66.97 m (219 ft 8 1/2 in)	
9	Jay Harvard	Georgia	65.67 m (215 ft 5 1/4 in)	
10	Xavier Tison	Southern Methodist	65.20 m (213 ft 10 3/4 in)	

=== Javelin Throw ===
- Only top eight final results shown; no prelims are listed

Rank	Name	University	Distance	Notes
1st place, gold medalist(s)	Matti Narhi Finland	Texas-El Paso	79.74 m (261 ft 7 1/4 in)	
2nd place, silver medalist(s)	Esko Mikkola Finland	Arizona	76.81 m (252 ft 0 in)	
3rd place, bronze medalist(s)	Scott Russell	Kansas	76.80 m (251 ft 11 1/2 in)	
4	Breaux Greer	Northeast Louisiana	73.57 m (241 ft 4 1/4 in)	
5	Daniel Gustafsson Sweden	Southern Methodist	72.16 m (236 ft 8 3/4 in)	
6	Torsten Sippel	Southern Methodist	71.26 m (233 ft 9 1/2 in)	
7	Darin File	Missouri	71.24 m (233 ft 8 1/2 in)	
8	Vic Morency	Massachusetts	69.76 m (228 ft 10 1/4 in)	
9	Ola Larsen	Arizona	68.90 m (226 ft 1/2 in)	
10	Rob Manning	Princeton	68.26 m (223 ft 11 1/4 in)	

=== Decathlon ===
Rank	Name	University	Time	Notes
1st place, gold medalist(s)	Klaus Ambrosch Austria	Arizona	7825	
2nd place, silver medalist(s)	Attila Zsivoczky Hungary	Kansas State	7817	
3rd place, bronze medalist(s)	Brendon Falconer	Kent State	7722	
4	Ross Bomben	California	7693	
5	Phil McMullen	Western Mich	7613	
6	Greg Gill	Wisconsin	7592	
7	Daniel Haag	USC	7339	
8	Kendall Madden	Texas A&M	7327	
9	Bevan Hart	California	7270	
10	Pat Buckheit	Tennessee	7232	

== Women's events ==
=== 100 meters ===
- Final results shown, not prelims

Rank	Name	University	Time	Notes
1st place, gold medalist(s)	Angela Williams	USC	11.04	
2nd place, silver medalist(s)	Debbie Ferguson Bahamas	Georgia	11.10	
3rd place, bronze medalist(s)	Peta-Gaye Dowdie Jamaica	LSU	11.13	
4	Nanceen Perry	Texas	11.15	
5	Latasha Jenkins	Ball State	11.20	
6	Kelli White	Tennessee	11.20	
7	Shakedia Jones	UCLA	11.23	
8	Torri Edwards	USC	11.26	

=== 200 meters ===
- Final results shown, not prelims

Rank	Name	University	Time	Notes
1st place, gold medalist(s)	Latasha Jenkins	Ball State	22.29	
2nd place, silver medalist(s)	Debbie Ferguson Bahamas	Georgia	22.53	
3rd place, bronze medalist(s)	Kelli White	Tennessee	22.65	
4	Nanceen Perry	Texas	22.67	
5	Peta-Gaye Dowdie Jamaica	LSU	22.81	
6	Torri Edwards	USC	22.89	
7	Shekera Weston	Clemson	23.23	
8	Aminah Haddad	Texas	23.36	

=== 400 meters ===
- Final results shown, not prelims

Rank	Name	University	Time	Notes
1st place, gold medalist(s)	Suziann Reid	Texas	51.08	
2nd place, silver medalist(s)	Mikele Barber	South Carolina	51.66	
3rd place, bronze medalist(s)	Stella Klassen	Nebraska	52.07	
4	Yolanda Brown-Moore	Florida	52.34	
5	Yulanda Nelson	Baylor	52.55	
6	Samantha George	Florida State	53.16	
7	Demetria Washington	South Carolina	53.20	
8	Amy Tidwell	Utah	54.33	

=== 800 meters ===
- Final results shown, not prelims

Rank	Name	University	Time	Notes
1st place, gold medalist(s)	Claudine Williams Jamaica	LSU	2:03.38	
2nd place, silver medalist(s)	Liz Diaz	Texas	2:03.44	
3rd place, bronze medalist(s)	Brigita Langerholc Slovenia	USC	2:03.79	
4	Tytti Reho Finland	Southern Methodist	2:04.99	
5	Ashley Wysong	Missouri	2:05.38	
6	Marissa DeFreese	Seton Hall	2:05.61	
7	Chantee Earl	Pittsburgh	2:05.74	
8	Treva Bryant	Brigham Young	2:06.06	

=== 1500 meters ===
- Final results shown, not prelims

Rank	Name	University	Time	Notes
1st place, gold medalist(s)	Mary Jayne Harrelson	Appalachian State	4:21.06	
2nd place, silver medalist(s)	Grazyna Penc	USC	4:22.61	
3rd place, bronze medalist(s)	Hanne Lyngstad	Tulane	4:22.64	
4	Susanne Heyer	Penn State	4:22.99	
5	Janet Westphal	Wisconsin	4:24.12	
6	Carmen Douma Canada	Villanova	4:24.59	
7	Jamie King	Eastern Kentucky	4:26.87	
8	Becky Megesi	Georgia Tech	4:28.15	
9	Stephanie Pesch	Wisconsin	4:29.07	
10	Anna Lopaciuch	USC	4:32.21	

=== 3000 meters ===
- Final results shown, not prelims

Rank	Name	University	Time	Notes
1st place, gold medalist(s)	Carrie Tollefson	Villanova	9:26.51	
2nd place, silver medalist(s)	Kara Wheeler	Colorado	9:29.89	
3rd place, bronze medalist(s)	Maria-Elena Calle	Virginia Commonwealth	9:33.04	
4	Sharolyn Shields	Brigham Young	9:34.41	
5	Sally Glynn	Stanford	9:40.06	
6	Julia Stamps	Stanford	9:40.82	
7	Jenelle Deatherage	Wisconsin	9:43.31	
8	Sarah Dupre	Providence	9:46.18	
9	Maggie Chan Man Yee Hong Kong	Brigham Young	9:48.55	
10	Kristen Gordon	Georgetown	9:54.51	

=== 5000 meters ===
- Final results shown, not prelims

Rank	Name	University	Time	Notes
1st place, gold medalist(s)	Carrie Tollefson	Villanova	16:09.51	
2nd place, silver medalist(s)	Leigh Daniel	Texas Tech	16:12.72	
3rd place, bronze medalist(s)	Katie McGregor	Michigan	16:15.75	
4	JoAnna Deeter	Notre Dame	16:18.56	
5	Amy Yoder	Arkansas	16:20.93	
6	Jessica Koch	Arkansas	16:23.80	
7	Maggie Chan Hong Kong	Brigham Young	16:27.95	
8	Elizabeth Jackson	Brigham Young	16:31.94	
9	Christy Nichols	North Carolina State	16:33.25	
10	Sherri Smith	Baylor	16:35.75	

=== 10,000 meters ===
- Final results shown, no prelims

Rank	Name	University	Time	Notes
1st place, gold medalist(s)	Leigh Daniel	Texas Tech	34:01.63	
2nd place, silver medalist(s)	Tara Rohatinsky	Brigham Young	34:04.02	
3rd place, bronze medalist(s)	JoAnna Deeter	Notre Dame	34:05.89	
4	Carrie Gould	Eastern Michigan	34:09.50	
5	Marty Hernandez	Brigham Young	34:09.88	
6	Sherri Smith	Baylor	34:20.03	
7	Alison Klemmer	Notre Dame	34:26.74	
8	Emily Nay	Brigham Young	34:43.98	
9	Tara Chaplin	Arizona	34:52.96	
10	Heather Anderson	Montana	35:05.52	

=== 100 meters hurdles ===
- Final results shown, not prelims

Rank	Name	University	Time	Notes
1st place, gold medalist(s)	Yolanda McCray	Miami	12.85	
2nd place, silver medalist(s)	Andria King	Georgia Tech	12.87	
3rd place, bronze medalist(s)	Joanna Hayes	UCLA	12.89	
4	Dominque Calloway	Ohio State	12.92	
5	Donica Merriman	Ohio State	12.96	
6	Jenny Adams	Houston	12.98	
7	EllaKisha Williamson	South Carolina	13.25	
8	Joyce Bates	LSU	13.45	

=== 400 meters hurdles ===
Rank	Name	University	Time	Notes
1st place, gold medalist(s)	Joanna Hayes	UCLA	55.16	
2nd place, silver medalist(s)	Tanya Jarrett	Texas	55.80	
3rd place, bronze medalist(s)	Dominque Calloway	Ohio State	56.02	
4	Natasha Danvers United Kingdom	USC	56.03	
5	Saidat Onanuga Nigeria	Texas-El Paso	57.02	
6	Nikkie Bouyer	Clemson	57.74	
7	Natalie Gibson	Southern Utah	58.38	
8	Angel Patterson	Texas	58.70	

=== 4x100-meter relay ===
- Final results shown, not prelims

Rank	University	Time	Notes
1st place, gold medalist(s)	Texas	42.95	
2nd place, silver medalist(s)	USC	43.52	
3rd place, bronze medalist(s)	UCLA	43.81	
4	Georgia	43.95	
5	South Carolina	44.26	
6	Tennessee	44.61	
7	Clemson	44.63	
8	Baylor	44.82	

=== 4x400-meter relay ===
- Final results shown, not prelims

Rank	University	Time	Notes
1st place, gold medalist(s)	Texas	3:27.08	
2nd place, silver medalist(s)	USC	3:28.08	
3rd place, bronze medalist(s)	UCLA	3:29.41	
4	LSU	3:32.07	
5	Southwest Missouri State	3:33.06	
6	Florida	3:34.11	
7	Baylor	3:34.66	
8	George Mason	3:35.04	

=== High Jump ===
- Only top eight final results shown; no prelims are listed

Rank	Name	University	Height	Notes
1st place, gold medalist(s)	Kajsa Bergqvist Sweden	Southern Methodist	1.90 m (6 ft 2 3/4 in)	
2nd place, silver medalist(s)	Dora Gyorffy Hungary	Harvard	1.90 m (6 ft 2 3/4 in)	
3rd place, bronze medalist(s)	Nicole Forrester Canada	Michigan	1.87 m (6 ft 1 1/2 in)	
4	Whitney Evans	Washington State	1.84 m (6 ft 1/4 in)	
5	Erin Aldrich	Texas	1.81 m (5 ft 11 1/4 in)	
6	Leslie Price	Boise State	1.81 m (5 ft 11 1/4 in)	
6	Joy Ganes	North Carolina	1.81 m (5 ft 11 1/4 in)	
8	Carrie Long	Purdue	1.81 m (5 ft 11 1/4 in)	
9	Mary Varga	Akron	1.81 m (5 ft 11 1/4 in)	
10	Stacy-Ann Grant	Illinois	1.81 m (5 ft 11 1/4 in)	

=== Pole Vault ===
- Only top eight final results shown; no prelims are listed

Rank	Name	University	Height	Notes
1st place, gold medalist(s)	Paula Serrano	Cal Poly	4.10 m (13 ft 5 1/4 in)	
2nd place, silver medalist(s)	Tracy O'Hara	UCLA	4.00 m (13 ft 1 1/4 in)	
3rd place, bronze medalist(s)	Candy Mason	Kansas	3.90 m (12 ft 9 1/2 in)	
4	Andrea Branson	Kansas	3.90 m (12 ft 9 1/2 in)	
5	Niki Reed	Oregon	3.90 m (12 ft 9 1/2 in)	
6	Melissa Price	Fresno State	3.90 m (12 ft 9 1/2 in)	
7	Aimee Crabtree	San Diego State	3.80 m (12 ft 5 1/2 in)	
8	Erin Anderson	Kansas State	3.80 m (12 ft 5 1/2 in)	
9	Shae Bair	Utah State	3.80 m (12 ft 5 1/2 in)	
10	Sara Higham	Brigham Young	3.80 m (12 ft 5 1/2 in)	

=== Long Jump ===
- Only top eight final results shown; no prelims are listed

Rank	Name	University	Distance	Wind	Notes
1st place, gold medalist(s)	Trecia Smith Jamaica	Pittsburgh	6.61 m (21 ft 8 in)	+1.2	
2nd place, silver medalist(s)	Angela Brown	George Mason	6.47 m (21 ft 2 1/2 in)	+1.4	
3rd place, bronze medalist(s)	Pam Simpson	Southern California	6.46 m (21 ft 2 1/4 in)w	+2.6	
4	Jenny Adams	Houston	6.45 m (21 ft 1 3/4 in)	+2.0	
5	Dalhia Ingram	Nebraska	6.44 m (21 ft 1 1/2 in)	+0.7	
6	Ola Sesay Sierra Leone	Kentucky	6.40 m (20 ft 11 3/4 in)	+0.8	
7	Keyon Soley	UCLA	6.39 m (20 ft 11 1/2 in)	+1.1	
8	Shakeema Walker	Penn State	6.24 m (20 ft 5 1/2 in)	+0.6	
9	Nicole Gamble	North Carolina	6.19 m (20 ft 3 1/2 in)	+1.1	
10	Kirstin Bolm	Brigham Young	6.18 m (20 ft 3 1/4 in)	-0.3	

=== Triple Jump ===
- Only top eight final results shown; no prelims are listed

Rank	Name	University	Distance	Wind	Notes
1st place, gold medalist(s)	Stacey Bowers	Baylor	13.97 m (45 ft 10 in)	+0.6	
2nd place, silver medalist(s)	Trecia Smith Jamaica	Pittsburgh	13.91 m (45 ft 7 1/2 in)	+1.1	
3rd place, bronze medalist(s)	Keisha Spencer Jamaica	LSU	13.72 m (45 ft 0 in)w	+2.7	
4	Nicole Gamble	North Carolina	13.61 m (44 ft 7 3/4 in)w	+5.0	
5	Dalhia Ingram	Nebraska	13.51 m (44 ft 3 3/4 in)w	+2.1	
6	Detrich Clariett	Texas A&M	13.51 m (44 ft 3 3/4 in)w	+2.3	
7	Shakeema Walker	Penn State	13.50 m (44 ft 3 1/4 in)	+0.6	
8	LaShonda Christopher	North Carolina	13.33 m (43 ft 8 3/4 in)w	+3.3	
9	Kerine Black	South Florida	13.14 m (43 ft 1 1/4 in)	+0.7	
10	Kristel Berendsen	Brigham Young	13.11 m (43 ft 0 in)	+0.7	

=== Shot Put ===
- Only top eight final results shown; no prelims are listed

Rank	Name	University	Distance	Notes
1st place, gold medalist(s)	Seilala Sua	UCLA	17.60 m (57 ft 8 3/4 in)	
2nd place, silver medalist(s)	Leslie Vidmar	Kent State	16.77 m (55 ft 0 in)	
3rd place, bronze medalist(s)	Rhonda Hackett	Georgia	16.64 m (54 ft 7 in)	
4	Kristin Heaston	California	16.46 m (54 ft 0 in)	
5	Lisa Griebel	Iowa State	16.41 m (53 ft 10 in)	
6	Cheree Hicks	Syracuse	16.21 m (53 ft 2 in)	
7	Linda Nestorsson	Northern Arizona	16.19 m (53 ft 1 1/4 in)	
8	Jessica Marable	Nevada-Las Vegas	15.92 m (52 ft 2 3/4 in)	
9	Collinus Newsome	Illinois	15.79 m (51 ft 9 1/2 in)	
10	Marika Tuliniemi Finland	Southern Methodist	15.64 m (51 ft 3 1/2 in)	

=== Discus ===
- Only top eight final results shown; no prelims are listed

Rank	Name	University	Distance	Notes
1st place, gold medalist(s)	Seilala Sua	UCLA	64.26 m (210 ft 9 3/4 in)	
2nd place, silver medalist(s)	Shelly Borrman	Colorado State	58.45 m (191 ft 9 in)	
3rd place, bronze medalist(s)	Cheree Hicks	Syracuse	57.38 m (188 ft 3 in)	
4	April Malveo	Louisiana Tech	55.89 m (183 ft 4 1/4 in)	
5	Grete Etholm	Southern Methodist	55.27 m (181 ft 3 3/4 in)	
6	Deshaya Williams	Penn State	54.46 m (178 ft 8 in)	
7	Nicole Chimko	Minnesota	54.25 m (177 ft 11 3/4 in)	
8	Roberta Collins	Kent State	53.34 m (175 ft 0 in)	
9	Mandy Borschowa	Washington State	52.50 m (172 ft 2 3/4 in)	
10	Robin Lyons	Wyoming	52.10 m (170 ft 11 in)	

=== Hammer Throw ===
- Only top eight final results shown; no prelims are listed

Rank	Name	University	Distance	Notes
1st place, gold medalist(s)	Florence Ezeh Togo	Southern Methodist	63.14 m (207 ft 1 3/4 in)	
2nd place, silver medalist(s)	Michelle Fournier Canada	South Carolina	62.91 m (206 ft 4 3/4 in)	
3rd place, bronze medalist(s)	Renetta Seiler	Kansas State	61.97 m (203 ft 3 3/4 in)	
4	Robin Lyons	Wyoming	60.65 m (198 ft 11 3/4 in)	
5	Anna Whitham	Kansas State	59.34 m (194 ft 8 in)	
6	Jennifer Vail	Southern California	58.89 m (193 ft 2 1/2 in)	
7	Bethany Hart	Connecticut	58.37 m (191 ft 6 in)	
8	Maureen Griffin	Arizona	58.20 m (190 ft 11 1/4 in)	
9	Michelle Clayton	East Carolina	57.89 m (189 ft 11 in)	
10	Melissa Price	Nebraska	57.77 m (189 ft 6 1/4 in)	

=== Javelin Throw ===
- Only top eight final results shown; no prelims are listed

Rank	Name	University	Distance	Notes
1st place, gold medalist(s)	Vigdis Gudjonsdottir	Georgia	55.54 m (182 ft 2 1/2 in)	
2nd place, silver medalist(s)	Olivia McKoy Jamaica	Louisiana Tech	54.20 m (177 ft 9 3/4 in)	
3rd place, bronze medalist(s)	Linda Lindqvist	Minnesota	52.60 m (172 ft 6 3/4 in)	
4	Emily Carlsten	Florida	52.09 m (170 ft 10 3/4 in)	
5	Katy Doyle	Texas A&M	51.73 m (169 ft 8 1/2 in)	
6	Samantha Chesson	McNeese State	51.63 m (169 ft 4 1/2 in)	
7	Serene Ross	Purdue	51.54 m (169 ft 1 in)	
8	Cassi Morelock	Nebraska	51.38 m (168 ft 6 3/4 in)	
9	Liza Randjelovic	Southern Methodist	50.81 m (166 ft 8 1/4 in)	
10	Ann Crouse	Virginia	49.47 m (162 ft 3 1/2 in)	

=== Heptathlon ===
Rank	Name	University	Score	Notes
1st place, gold medalist(s)	Tracye Lawyer	Stanford	3721	
2nd place, silver medalist(s)	Sabine Krieger	Northern Arizona	3463	
3rd place, bronze medalist(s)	Trecia Smith Jamaica	Pittsburgh	3414	
4	Alicia Brimhall	Brigham Young	3381	
5	Christi Smith	Akron	3363	
6	Ifoma Jones	Houston	3350	
7	Whitney Evans	Washington State	3342	
8	Ellannee Richardson	Washington State	3319	
9	Rannveig Kvalvik	Missouri	3300	
10	Mellanee Welty	Wichita State	3290	
