= Wyoming Cowboys and Cowgirls track and field =

American college track and field team

- University: University of Wyoming
- Head coach: Bryan Berryhill
- Conference: MW
- Location: Laramie, Wyoming
- Outdoor track: Louis S. Madrid Sports Complex
- Nickname: Cowboys and Cowgirls

The Wyoming Cowboys and Cowgirls track and field team is the track and field program that represents University of Wyoming. The Cowboys and Cowgirls compete in NCAA Division I as a member of the Mountain West Conference. The team is based in Laramie, Wyoming, at the Louis S. Madrid Sports Complex.

The program is coached by Bryan Berryhill. The track and field program officially encompasses four teams because the NCAA considers men's and women's indoor track and field and outdoor track and field as separate sports.

Middle-distance runner Paul Carlin, who later became the United States Postmaster General, was the university's first All-American finisher. Wesley Maiyo was the school's first national champion, which he did over 1000 meters at the 1974 NCAA Indoor Track and Field Championships.

== Postseason ==
=== AIAW ===
The Cowgirls have had two AIAW All-Americans finishing in the top six at the AIAW indoor or outdoor championships.

AIAW All-Americans
Championships	Name	Event	Place
1979 Indoor	Laura Ferguson	600 yards	5th
1980 Indoor	Laura Ferguson	600 meters	6th
1980 Indoor	Pat Miller	Long jump	3rd
1980 Outdoor	Pat Miller	Long jump	5th

=== NCAA ===
As of August 2025, a total of 22 men and 5 women have achieved individual first-team All-American status for the team at the Division I men's outdoor, women's outdoor, men's indoor, or women's indoor national championships (using the modern criteria of top-8 placing regardless of athlete nationality).

First team NCAA All-Americans
Team	Championships	Name	Event	Place	Ref.
Men's	1953 Outdoor	Paul Carlin	800 meters	3rd	
Men's	1974 Indoor	Wesley Maiyo	1000 meters	1st	
Men's	1975 Indoor	Wesley Maiyo	1000 meters	2nd	
Men's	1978 Indoor	Joseph Nzau	3000 meters	3rd	
Men's	1978 Outdoor	Joseph Nzau	10,000 meters	5th	
Men's	1979 Outdoor	Joseph Nzau	10,000 meters	5th	
Men's	1979 Outdoor	Simon Kilili	10,000 meters	7th	
Men's	1979 Outdoor	Mike White	High jump	8th	
Men's	1980 Indoor	Geir Kvernmo	3000 meters	5th	
Men's	1980 Outdoor	Geir Kvernmo	10,000 meters	3rd	
Men's	1982 Outdoor	Joseph Nzau	10,000 meters	4th	
Men's	1984 Indoor	Espen Borge	800 meters	6th	
Men's	1984 Outdoor	Jay Novacek	Decathlon	4th	
Men's	1995 Indoor	Ryan Butler	Weight throw	5th	
Men's	1996 Indoor	Ryan Butler	Weight throw	1st	
Men's	1997 Outdoor	Matt Spears	Shot put	7th	
Men's	1998 Indoor	Kevin Mannon	Weight throw	8th	
Women's	1998 Indoor	Jesseca Cross	Shot put	3rd	
Men's	1998 Outdoor	Kevin Mannon	Shot put	7th	
Women's	1998 Outdoor	Jesseca Cross	Shot put	8th	
Men's	1999 Indoor	Kevin Mannon	Weight throw	2nd	
Men's	1999 Indoor	Jason Gervais	Weight throw	8th	
Women's	1999 Indoor	Robin Lyons	Weight throw	6th	
Women's	1999 Outdoor	Robin Lyons	Hammer throw	4th	
Men's	2000 Indoor	Jason Gervais	Weight throw	3rd	
Women's	2000 Indoor	Robin Lyons	Weight throw	3rd	
Women's	2000 Indoor	Julie Thomas	Weight throw	7th	
Men's	2000 Outdoor	Jason Gervais	Shot put	7th	
Men's	2000 Outdoor	Jason Gervais	Discus throw	2nd	
Women's	2000 Outdoor	Robin Lyons	Discus throw	5th	
Women's	2000 Outdoor	Robin Lyons	Hammer throw	3rd	
Men's	2001 Indoor	Quincy Howe	Triple jump	6th	
Men's	2001 Indoor	Jason Gervais	Weight throw	7th	
Men's	2001 Indoor	Derek Woodske	Weight throw	8th	
Men's	2001 Outdoor	Jason Gervais	Discus throw	7th	
Men's	2001 Outdoor	Jason Hammond	Hammer throw	8th	
Women's	2001 Outdoor	Andrea Batt	Javelin throw	5th	
Men's	2002 Indoor	Quincy Howe	Triple jump	7th	
Women's	2003 Outdoor	Shauna Smith	400 meters hurdles	7th	
Men's	2004 Indoor	Zack Schaefer	Weight throw	7th	
Women's	2004 Indoor	Shauna Smith	400 meters	6th	
Women's	2004 Outdoor	Shauna Smith	400 meters hurdles	3rd	
Women's	2005 Outdoor	Shauna Smith	400 meters hurdles	1st	
Women's	2005 Outdoor	Shauna Smith	4 × 400 meters relay	7th	
Women's	2005 Outdoor	Sharon Larrier	4 × 400 meters relay	7th	
Women's	2005 Outdoor	Amanda Hopper	4 × 400 meters relay	7th	
Women's	2005 Outdoor	Jessica Fox	4 × 400 meters relay	7th	
Men's	2008 Indoor	Mark Korir	5000 meters	4th	
Men's	2009 Indoor	Jake Shanklin	Weight throw	7th	
Men's	2014 Indoor	Mason Finley	Shot put	4th	
Men's	2014 Outdoor	Mason Finley	Discus throw	6th	
Men's	2017 Outdoor	Scott Carter	Triple jump	3rd	
Men's	2021 Outdoor	Colton Paller	Discus throw	7th	
Men's	2025 Indoor	Daniel Reynolds	Weight throw	1st	
Men's	2025 Outdoor	Daniel Reynolds	Hammer throw	7th	

== See also ==
- Category:Wyoming Cowboys track and field athletes (10)
- Category:Wyoming Cowgirls track and field athletes (4)
