= Bogdan Poprawski =

Canadian track and field coach

- Born: January 8, 1948 (age 78); Chorzów, Poland
- Occupations: track and field head coach, sports commentator, businessman
- Years active: 1970-

Bogdan Poprawski (born January 8, 1948, in Chorzów, Poland) is a Polish and Canadian coach, sport activist, businessman, and Canadian track and field head coach.

== Coaching career ==
Poprwawski is a graduate of the Academy of Physical Education in Poznań (1970), and has been an assistant professor at the WSWF/AWF (Academy of Physical Education) in Poznań (1970-1981). He received a Ph.D. in theory of sports (1975).

Track and Field coach at the AZS (University Sports Association of Poland) in Poznań (1970–81), representing Poland at track and field competitions as Polish National Team member in junior and espoirs categories. Author of 47 articles and 3 books on morphological criteria in selection for high performance sport, measurement of physical qualities in high performance sport and biomechanics of sport techniques.

Since 1981 living in Canada. Coach at the University of Toronto Canadian Track and Field High Performance Centre (1983-1996) and its manager (1993-1996). On many occasions Coach for the Canadian Track and Field teams at the Commonwealth Games (Edinburgh, Scotland 1986; Auckland, New Zealand 1990; Victoria, Canada 1994), World Athletics Championships (Rome, Italy 1987; Tokyo, Japan 1991; Stuttgart, Germany 1993; Athens, Greece 1997), Canadian Olympic Coach at the Summer Olympic Games in Seoul (1988), and in Barcelona (1992).

Personal coach of several Olympic athletes including Ray Lazdins, discus thrower (1988, 1992), Stephen Feraday, javelin thrower (1988, 1992), and Jason Gervais, discus thrower (2000). He retired from his international career as the head coach of the Canadian Track and Field Team at the World Championships in Athletics in 1997.

== Other activities ==
Olympics commentator for the multicultural OMNI Television station in Toronto, sports commentator for Toronto Polish-language newspapers (“Związkowiec”, “Wiadomości”) and online newspaper bejsment.com. Since 2019, sports editor, presenter and co-producer of Polish Studio TV in Toronto. Chairman of the Board of the Lakeshore United Soccer Club in Mississauga, Ontario (2013–2018).

Social activist. Vice-president of the Canada-Poland Chamber of Commerce (Toronto, 1992–2010). Member of the Ontario Trillium Foundation that provides grants for non-profit agencies across the Region of Peel (2004-2010). Received an Ontario Volunteer Award in 2010.

Since 1995, an independent real estate broker in Toronto. Since 1996, the owner of Spencer Group Inc. Realty Brokerage.
