= 2001 USA Indoor Track and Field Championships =

- Dates: March 2–3
- Host city: Atlanta, Georgia, United States
- Venue: Georgia Dome
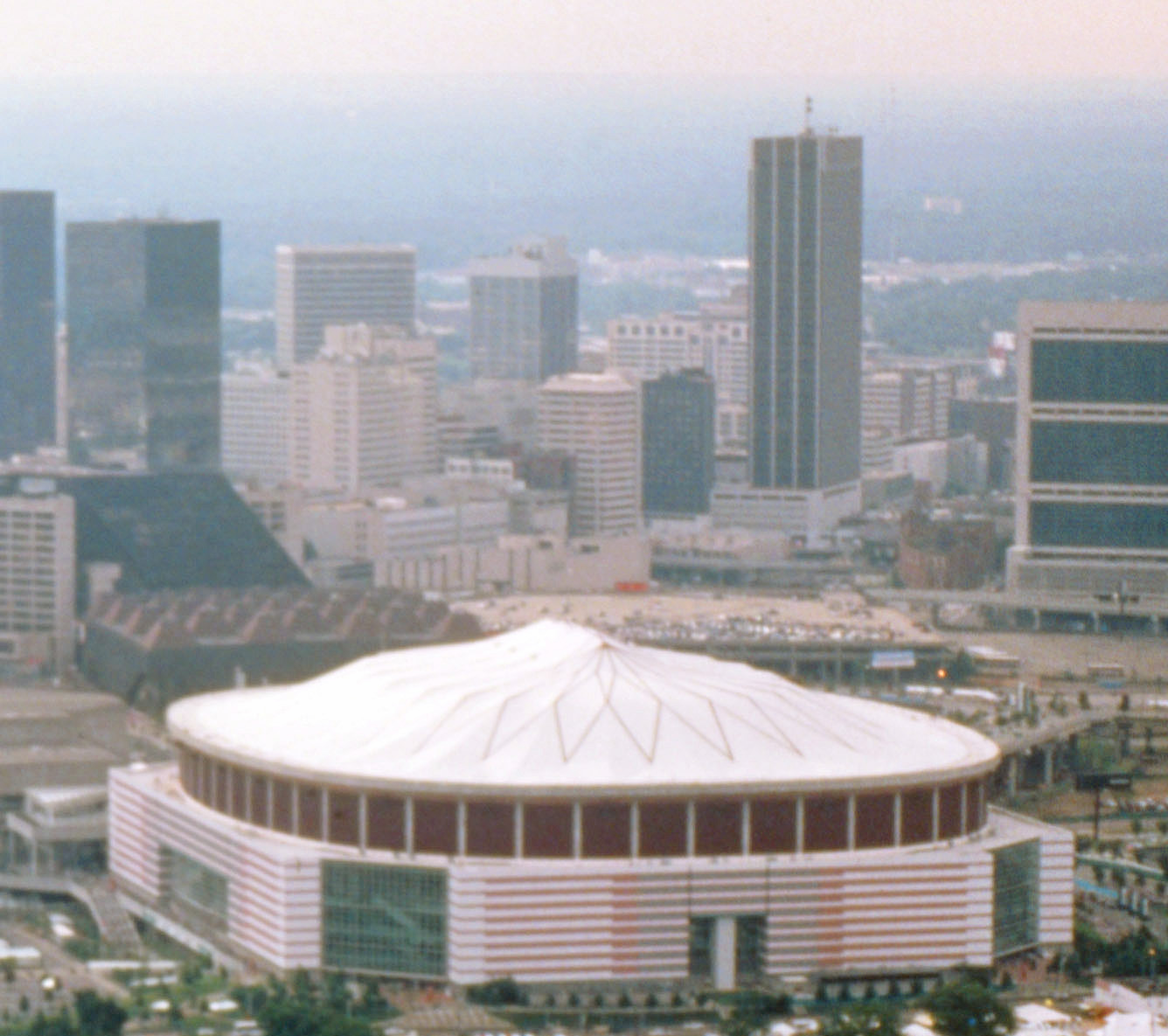
- Level: Senior
- Type: Indoor
- Events: 29 (15 men's + 14 women's)

The 2001 USA Indoor Track and Field Championships were held at the Georgia Dome in Atlanta, Georgia. Organized by USA Track and Field (USATF), the two-day competition took place March 2–3 and served as the national championships in indoor track and field for the United States. The championships in combined track and field events were held at a different time.

The competition was a qualifier for the U.S. team at the 2001 World Indoor Championships in Athletics. At the meeting, Stacy Dragila won the women's pole vault despite jumping lower than her usual height.

== Medal summary ==
=== Men ===
Event	Gold		Silver	Bronze
60 m	Maurice Greene	6.51		
200 m	Coby Miller	20.31		
400 m	James Davis	46.16		
800 m	Trinity Gray	1:47.10		
Mile run	Seneca Lassiter	3:58.67		
3000 m	Tim Broe	7:52.22		
60 m hurdles	Terrence Trammell	7.49		
High jump	Nathan Leeper	2.28 m		
Pole vault	Lawrence Johnson	5.96 m		
Long jump	Dwight Phillips	8.12 m		
Triple jump	LaMark Carter	16.90 m		
Shot put	Adam Nelson	21.40 m		
Weight throw	John McEwen	22.67 m		
Heptathlon	Stephen Moore	6078 pts		
5000 m walk	Tim Seaman	19:29.96		

=== Women ===
Event	Gold		Silver	Bronze
60 m	Chryste Gaines	7.15		
200 m	LaTasha Jenkins	23.07		
400 m	Suziann Reid	52.01		
800 m	Jearl Miles Clark	2:00.96		
Mile run	Collette Liss	4:35.24		
3000 m	Regina Jacobs	8:54.56		
60 m hurdles	Anjanette Kirkland	7.97		
High jump	Amy Acuff	1.92 m		
Pole vault	Stacy Dragila	4.56 m		
Long jump	Dawn Burrell	6.68 m		
Triple jump	Tiombe Hurd	14.04 m		
Shot put	Connie Price-Smith	18.35 m		
Weight throw	Dawn Ellerbe	22.29 m		
3000 m walk	Michelle Rohl	12:28.32		
