= Athletics at the 1999 Summer Universiade – Women's 10,000 metres =

The women's 10,000 metres event at the 1999 Summer Universiade was held on 8 July at the Estadio Son Moix in Palma de Mallorca, Spain.

== Results ==
Rank	Athlete	Nationality	Time	Notes
1st place, gold medalist(s)	Leigh Daniel	United States	32:58.80	
2nd place, silver medalist(s)	Yuri Kanō	Japan	33:16.41	
3rd place, bronze medalist(s)	Annemette Jensen	Denmark	33:36.11	
4	Patricia Arribas	Spain	34:04.31	
5	Hulda Nwokocha	Nigeria	34:58.43	
6	Naima Bara	Morocco	35:09.27	
7	Tara Rohatinsky	United States	35:12.64	
	Tara Krzywicki	Great Britain	DNF	
	Najat Karzaz	Morocco	DNF	
	Margarita Tapia	Mexico	DNF	
