= Aleksandr Ladeyshchikov =

Russian sprinter

Personal information
- Born: August 26, 1979 (age 47)

Sport
- Sport: Track and field
Medal record
Representing Russia
World Indoor Championships
Silver medal – second place	2001 Lisbon	4x400 m relay

Aleksandr Ladeyshchikov (born August 26, 1979) is a Russian former sprinter. Along with Ruslan Mashchenko, Boris Gorban, and Andrey Semyonov, he won a silver medal in the 4 × 400 m relay at the 2001 IAAF World Indoor Championships, setting a national record for this event.
