= Trinity Gray =

American middle-distance runner (born 1978)

Personal information
- Born: April 3, 1978 (age 48) Yeadon, Pennsylvania, United States
- Height: 184 cm (6 ft 0 in)
- Weight: 73 kg (161 lb)

Sport
- Country: United States
- Sport: Athletics
- Events: 400 meters 800 meters

Achievements and titles
- Personal best: 800 m: 1:44.54 (2001)
Medal record
Men's athletics
Representing the United States
World Indoor Championships
Disqualified	2001 Lisbon	4 × 400 m relay
Pan American U20 Championships
Silver medal – second place	1997 Havana	800 m

Trinity Shawn Gray (born April 3, 1978) is an American former middle-distance runner. Over 800 meters, he was a runner-up at the 1999 NCAA Division I Indoor Track and Field Championships for the Brown Bears track and field team and he won the 2001 USA Indoor Track and Field Championships, qualifying him to represent the U.S. at the 2001 IAAF World Indoor Championships. On the 2001 World Indoor Championships relay, Gray won the silver medal, although it was later rescinded due to his teammates doping.

== Career ==
Gray was 3rd at the 1996 USA U20 Outdoor Track and Field Championships in the 800 m, running 1:49.93 minutes. He won the National Scholastic Outdoor Championships in the 800 m. In college, he ran for the Brown Bears track and field team.

As a freshman, Gray won the IC4A 800 m title. That summer at the 1997 Pan American Junior Athletics Championships, Gray won the silver medal in the 800 m behind Moses Washington.

He was known for his "all-out" running style, getting to the front of races early. He began as a sprinter and transitioned to focus on middle distances under Brown coach Bob Rothenberg. Asked if he would rather win a race in a slow time or finish 2nd in a fast time, Gray said, "I would rather run for time". He believed this was the way he could eventually break the 800 meters world record.

As a sophomore at the 1998 NCAA Division I Indoor Track and Field Championships, Gray was 7th in the 800 m and 5th as the 800 m leg of Brown's distance medley relay. He improved to 6th in the 800 m at the 1998 NCAA Division I Outdoor Track and Field Championships. He continued to finish 4th in the 800 m at the 1998 USA Outdoor Track and Field Championships.

In 1999, Gray was runner-up in the 800 m at the 1999 NCAA Division I Indoor Track and Field Championships behind only Derrick Peterson. Both athletes broke the collegiate indoor record in the event, with Gray running 1:46.05. Outdoors, he was 6th in the 800 m at the 1999 NCAA Division I Outdoor Track and Field Championships and entered in the 1999 USA Outdoor Track and Field Championships, where he was 5th in his semi-final. He went on to compete at the 1999 World University Games 800 m, where he qualified for the finals and finished 8th.

His senior year at the 2000 NCAA Division I Indoor Track and Field Championships, Gray was 4th in the 800 m and he improved to 3rd at the 2000 NCAA Division I Outdoor Track and Field Championships. At the 2000 United States Olympic trials, Gray was 6th in the finals as only three could make the Olympic team. During the summer of 2000 at the Rieti Grand Prix, Gray ran an 800 m best of 1:44.91 – a time that would stand as the fastest by any American that year.

At Brown, Gray won Ivy League conference championships in seven different events – 400 m, 500 m, 800 m, 1000 m, 4 × 400 m, 4 × 800 m, and distance medley relay.

From 2001 to 2003, Gray ran professionally. He won his first senior national title at the 2001 USA Indoor Track and Field Championships in the 800 m, qualifying him to represent the U.S. at the 2001 IAAF World Indoor Championships in both the 800 m and 4 × 400 m relay. On the World Indoors individual 800 m, Gray ran the second-fastest time overall in the heats and advanced to the semi-finals. In his semi-final, he led the field by 20 meters at 400 m and maintained a lead by 600 m, but faded to 5th in the final 200 m and did not make the finals. At the 2001 World Indoors relay, Gray ran anchor leg for the U.S. team in the semi-finals and 3rd leg in the finals, helping them to a silver medal finish. The medal was later revoked due to doping by Gray's teammates. Outdoors, he ran a personal best 1:44.54 mark for 800 m, again the best by an American that year. He competed at the final 2001 Goodwill Games in the 800 m, finishing 7th in the final.

In 2002, Gray advanced from the 800 m heats at the 2002 USA Outdoor Track and Field Championships but was 6th in his semi-final. The following year at the 2003 USA Outdoor Track and Field Championships he was 5th in his heat, failing to advance to the semi-finals. He continued to run at invitationals in 2004 but didn't compete at the 2004 United States Olympic trials.

== Personal life ==
Gray was born on April 3, 1978 and grew up in Yeadon, Pennsylvania. He has an older brother Deauchon and sister with whom he first ran for the Mt. Carmel Baptist Church in Philadelphia aged 6. Brown coach Bob Rothenberg first spotted Gray at an age group competition, where Gray was so scared to run that he started crying.

Gray's upbringing in West Philadelphia was described as surviving "one the world's toughest ghettoes". He was a victim of paternal violence and was raised by his mother Debra Price from the age of 11. When asked for his jacket by a stranger, he would give away the jacket, saying, "You can always buy another jacket". His older brother sold drugs and guns while Gray was running professionally.

Gray attended Franklin Learning Center high school, where he was inducted into the Public League Sports Hall of Fame. He originally studied math and science at Brown but switched to psychology and English after his freshman year. After his professional track career, he worked as an investment analyst for Bank of America, Morgan Stanley, and Merrill Lynch, and was a client relationship administrator for The Vanguard Group.

In January 2009, Gray began suffering from paranoid delusions at the same time that his employer Bank of America was firing employees due to the 2008 financial crisis. He suffered from a seizure and was taken to hospital, where an MRI discovered a brain tumor. It took seven days for his psychosis to subside, helped by a Brown teammate showing him pictures of them together on the team. Doctors initially told Gray that his brain tumor was unrelated to the delusions, but Rothenberg assisted Gray to get a second opinion and remove the tumor via surgery. The tumor re-appeared and was noticed via headache symptoms six months later, after which it was finally removed with a second surgery.

The second surgery left Gray with limited vision, joint pain, and thyroid issues resulting in weight gain. He was unable to work and was not able to get disability payments until around 2010. A fundraiser started by a former track teammate raised $11,000 for Gray before he was able to receive disability. He planned to return to work in summer 2010.

Gray was inducted into the Brown Bears hall of fame in 2011. His induction speech was about his brain tumor and received a standing ovation.

Gray opposed efforts to cut the Brown Bears track and field team in 2020, writing a letter saying, "As an African American alumni of the Brown University men's track and field programs, it is vital for me to let you know that cutting the men's track and field programs is an example of the institutionalised racism that people are rallying against across the country".

In 2025, Gray shared how he had adjusted back to normal life and used ChatGPT and YouTube to lose over 100 pounds (45 kg) in 8 months.
