= 2000 NCAA Division I Outdoor Track and Field Championships =

- Edition: 79th (Men); 19th (Women)
- Dates: May 31 – June 3, 2000
- Host city: (North Carolina) Durham, North Carolina; Duke University
- Venue: Wallace Wade Stadium
- Events: 42

The 2000 NCAA Division I Outdoor Track and Field Championships were the 79th NCAA Men's Division I Outdoor Track and Field Championships and the 19th NCAA Women's Division I Outdoor Track and Field Championships at Wallace Wade Stadium at Duke University in Durham, North Carolina from May 31 – June 3, 2000. In total, forty-two different men's and women's track and field events were contested.

== Results ==
=== Team scores ===
==== Men ====
Rank	Name	University	Notes
1st place, gold medalist(s)	Stanford	72	
2nd place, silver medalist(s)	Arkansas	59	
3rd place, bronze medalist(s)	Auburn	51	
4	Florida	50	
5	LSU	36	
6	Arizona	26	
7	USC	25	
7	Alabama	25	
9	Baylor	24	
10	Clemson	21	

==== Women ====
Rank	Name	University	Notes
1st place, gold medalist(s)	LSU	58	
2nd place, silver medalist(s)	USC	54	
3rd place, bronze medalist(s)	UCLA	47	
4	BYU	46	
5	Texas	39	
6	South Carolina	36	
6	Arkansas	36	
8	Colorado	26	
8	Houston	26	
8	Nebraska	26	

=== Men's events ===
==== 100 meters ====
- Final results shown, not prelims

1.2)

Rank	Name	University	Time	Notes
1st place, gold medalist(s)	Bernard Williams	Florida	10.03	
2nd place, silver medalist(s)	Coby Miller	Auburn	10.14	
3rd place, bronze medalist(s)	Kaaron Conwright	Cal Poly	10.19	
4	Lindel Frater Jamaica	TCU	10.20	
5	Daymon Carroll	Florida	10.24	
6	Shawn Crawford	Clemson	10.26	
7	Terrence Trammell	South Carolina	10.30	
8	Sultan McCullough	USC	10.38	

==== 200 meters ====
- Final results shown, not prelims

1.0)

Rank	Name	University	Time	Notes
1st place, gold medalist(s)	Shawn Crawford	Clemson	20.09	
2nd place, silver medalist(s)	Coby Miller	Auburn	20.12	
3rd place, bronze medalist(s)	Bernard Williams	Florida	20.28	
4	Darvis Patton	TCU	20.59	
5	Ricardo Williams	TCU	20.67	
6	JaWarren Hooker	Washington	20.78	
7	LeShaunte Edwards	Akron	20.79	
8	Brandon Evans	Texas A&M	21.23	

==== 400 meters ====
- Final results shown, not prelims

Rank	Name	University	Time	Notes
1st place, gold medalist(s)	Avard Moncur Bahamas	Auburn	44.72	
2nd place, silver medalist(s)	Geno White	Florida	45.02	
3rd place, bronze medalist(s)	Christopher Brown Bahamas	Norfolk State	45.08	
4	Brandon Couts	Baylor	45.09	
5	Michael Blackwood Jamaica	Oklahoma	45.11	
6	Andrew Pierce	Ohio State	45.29	
7	Bryan Swarn	Georgia Tech	45.72	
8	Sanjay Ayre Jamaica	Auburn	46.80	

==== 800 meters ====
- Final results shown, not prelims

Rank	Name	University	Time	Notes
1st place, gold medalist(s)	Patrick Nduwimana	Arizona	1:45.08	
2nd place, silver medalist(s)	Derrick Peterson	Missouri	1:45.18	
3rd place, bronze medalist(s)	Trinity Gray	Brown	1:45.68	
4	Michael Stember	Stanford	1:46.20	
5	Jess Strutzel	UCLA	1:46.39	
6	James Karanu	Arkansas	1:46.46	
7	Ned Brooks	Seton Hall	1:46.50	
8	Darren Dinneen	Harvard	1:47.35	

==== 1500 meters ====
- Final results shown, not prelims

Rank	Name	University	Time	Notes
1st place, gold medalist(s)	Gabe Jennings	Stanford	3:37.76	
2nd place, silver medalist(s)	Michael Stember	Stanford	3:39.53	
3rd place, bronze medalist(s)	Bryan Berryhill	Colorado St.	3:40.37	
4	David Kimani	S. Alabama	3:40.58	
5	Sharif Karie	Arkansas	3:41.10	
6	Daniel Kinyua	Iowa State	3:41.26	
7	James Karanu	Arkansas	3:42.07	
8	Ryan Travis	Arkansas	3:42.30	
9	Andrew McKessock	Minnesota	3:44.55	
10	Brendan Rodgers	NC State	3:45.85	

==== 3000 meters steeplechase ====
- Final results shown, not prelims

Rank	Name	University	Time	Notes
1st place, gold medalist(s)	Tim Broe	Alabama	8:39.03	
2nd place, silver medalist(s)	Ian Connor	Ohio State	8:41.16	
3rd place, bronze medalist(s)	Solomon Kandie	Tulane	8:42.07	
4	Anthony Famiglietti	Tennessee	8:42.49	
5	Jared Cordes	Wisconsin	8:42.57	
6	Chuck Sloan	Oklahoma St.	8:42.60	
7	Steve Slattery	Colorado	8:43.82	
8	Chris Dugan	N.C. State	8:45.56	
9	Billy Herman	Northern Arizona	8:49.14	
10	Shane Rogers	Air Force	8:54.10	

==== 5000 meters ====
- Final results shown, not prelims

Rank	Name	University	Time	Notes
1st place, gold medalist(s)	Brad Hauser	Stanford	13:48.80	
2nd place, silver medalist(s)	Matt Lane	William & Mary	13:49.92	
3rd place, bronze medalist(s)	Murray Link	Arkansas	13:50.89	
4	Brent Hauser	Stanford	13:51.22	
5	Tim Broe	Alabama	13:52.94	
6	Jonathan Riley	Stanford	13:54.61	
7	Fraser Thompson	Butler	13:58.07	
8	Jorge Torres	Colorado	14:04.18	
9	Mike Klass	Colorado St.	14:08.26	
10	Bolota Asmerom Eritrea	California	14:13.94	

==== 10,000 meters ====
- Final results shown, not prelims

Rank	Name	University	Time	Notes
1st place, gold medalist(s)	Brad Hauser	Stanford	30:38.57	
2nd place, silver medalist(s)	Jason Balkman	Stanford	30:38.92	
3rd place, bronze medalist(s)	Jason Lehmkuhle	Drake	30:41.73	
4	Brent Hauser	Stanford	30:42.17	
5	Stetson Steele	Iowa	30:45.67	
6	Steve Schell	Michigan St.	30:49.45	
7	Ryan Shay	Notre Dame	30:54.65	
8	Matt Downin	Wisconsin	30:58.41	
9	Stephen Ondieki	Fairleigh Di	31:00.18	
10	Adam Dailey	Arkansas	31:11.90	

==== 110 meters hurdles ====
- Final results shown, not prelims

-0.3)

Rank	Name	University	Time	Notes
1st place, gold medalist(s)	Terrence Trammell	South Carolina	13.43	
2nd place, silver medalist(s)	Aubrey Herring	Indiana St.	13.49	
3rd place, bronze medalist(s)	Todd Matthews	Clemson	13.57	
4	Ron Bramlett	Alabama	13.67	
5	D'Marcus Brown	Arkansas	13.78	
6	Adrian Woodley Canada	Syracuse	13.81	
7	Kenneth Fambro	Alabama	13.95	
8	Kris Allen	Texas A&M	14.05	

==== 400 meters hurdles ====
Rank	Name	University	Time	Notes
1st place, gold medalist(s)	Felix Sanchez Dominican Republic	USC	48.41	
2nd place, silver medalist(s)	Bayano Kamani Panama	Baylor	48.43	
3rd place, bronze medalist(s)	Sherman Armstrong	Illinois	48.61	
4	Sam Glover	Arkansas	49.08	
5	Adrian Mann	Florida	49.83	
6	Travis McAshan	Texas A&M	50.33	
7	Fred Sharpe	Clemson	51.06	
8	Michael Smith	Baylor	51.14	

==== 4x100-meter relay ====
- Final results shown, not prelims

Rank	University	Time	Notes
1st place, gold medalist(s)	Florida	38.35	
2nd place, silver medalist(s)	South Carolina	38.45	
3rd place, bronze medalist(s)	LSU	39.07	
4	Arizona St.	39.16	
5	USC	39.54	
6	Auburn	39.69	
7	UT-Arlington	40.10	
-	TCU	DNF	

==== 4x400-meter relay ====
- Final results shown, not prelims

Rank	University	Time	Notes
1st place, gold medalist(s)	Baylor	3:01.46	
2nd place, silver medalist(s)	Arkansas	3:03.14	
3rd place, bronze medalist(s)	USC	3:04.22	
4	TCU	3:04.22	
5	Oklahoma	3:04.23	
6	Georgia Tech	3:05.46	
7	E. Carolina	3:05.51	
8	Texas A&M	3:05.54	

==== High Jump ====
- Only top eight final results shown; no prelims are listed

Rank	Name	University	Height	Notes
1st place, gold medalist(s)	Mark Boswell Canada	Texas	2.31 m (7 ft 6 3/4 in)	
2nd place, silver medalist(s)	David Furman	Florida	2.25 m (7 ft 4 1/2 in)	
3rd place, bronze medalist(s)	Kenny Evans	Arkansas	2.25 m (7 ft 4 1/2 in)	
4	Lavar Miller	Arkansas	2.22 m (7 ft 3 1/4 in)	
5	Adam Shunk	Ball State	2.19 m (7 ft 2 in)	
5	Shaun Guice	Purdue	2.19 m (7 ft 2 in)	
7	Jason Boness	Oregon	2.19 m (7 ft 2 in)	
7	Mustapha Raifak France	SMU	2.19 m (7 ft 2 in)	
7	Tim Bell	Tennessee	2.19 m (7 ft 2 in)	
10	Jeff Mueller	Houston	2.15 m (7 ft 1/2 in)	

==== Pole Vault ====
- Only top eight final results shown; no prelims are listed

Rank	Name	University	Height	Notes
1st place, gold medalist(s)	Russ Buller	LSU	5.60 m (18 ft 4 1/4 in)	
2nd place, silver medalist(s)	Toby Stevenson	Stanford	5.60 m (18 ft 4 1/4 in)	
3rd place, bronze medalist(s)	Jeff Dutoit	Arizona	5.50 m (18 ft 1/2 in)	
4	Clark Humphreys	Auburn	5.50 m (18 ft 1/2 in)	
5	Jon Nance	Texas A&M	5.50 m (18 ft 1/2 in)	
6	Jim Davis	Fresno State	5.40 m (17 ft 8 1/2 in)	
6	Jacob Pauli	No. Iowa	5.40 m (17 ft 8 1/2 in)	
8	Matt Phillips	Washington	5.30 m (17 ft 4 1/2 in)	
8	Michael Westlund	Oklahoma	5.30 m (17 ft 4 1/2 in)	
10	Rocky Danners	Tennessee	5.30 m (17 ft 4 1/2 in)	

==== Long Jump ====
- Only top eight final results shown; no prelims are listed

Rank	Name	University	Distance	Wind	Notes
1st place, gold medalist(s)	Savante Stringfellow	Mississippi	8.17 m (26 ft 9 1/2 in)	+0.7	
2nd place, silver medalist(s)	Dwight Phillips	Arizona St.	8.12 m (26 ft 7 1/2 in)	+0.5	
3rd place, bronze medalist(s)	Marcus Thomas	LSU	7.94 m (26 ft 1/2 in)	+0.6	
4	Melvin Lister	Arkansas	7.92 m (25 ft 11 3/4 in)	+0.7	
5	Miguel Pate	Alabama	7.77 m (25 ft 5 3/4 in)	+0.3	
6	Ronald Nelson	Prairie View	7.77 m (25 ft 5 3/4 in)	+0.8	
7	Marshaun West	Notre Dame	7.69 m (25 ft 2 3/4 in)	+0.5	
8	Darvis Patton	TCU	7.59 m (24 ft 10 3/4 in)	+-0.6	
9	Joe Allen	Florida St.	7.58 m (24 ft 10 1/4 in)	+0.3	
10	Garfield Swaby	SW Texas St.	7.46 m (24 ft 5 1/2 in)	+0.4	

==== Triple Jump ====
- Only top eight final results shown; no prelims are listed

Rank	Name	University	Distance	Wind	Notes
1st place, gold medalist(s)	Melvin Lister	Arkansas	16.96 m (55 ft 7 1/2 in)	+0.4	
2nd place, silver medalist(s)	Chris Hercules	Texas	16.55 m (54 ft 3 1/2 in)	+0.8	
3rd place, bronze medalist(s)	Ike Olekaibe	Purdue	16.47 m (54 ft 1/4 in)	+0.9	
4	Marcus Thomas	LSU	16.41 m (53 ft 10 in)	+0.1	
5	Greg Yeldell	Indiana	16.29 m (53 ft 5 1/4 in)	+1.0	
6	Gregory Hughes Barbados	S.W. Mo. St.	16.19 m (53 ft 1 1/4 in)	+0.7	
7	Rephel Martin	UNC Charlotte	16.17 m (53 ft 1/2 in)	+0.7	
8	Malcolm Leason	Georgia Tech	16.02 m (52 ft 6 1/2 in)	+0.7	
9	Bryant Wesco	La. Tech	15.87 m (52 ft 3/4 in)	+0.5	
10	Djeke Mambo	USC	15.85 m (52 ft 0 in)	-0.3	

==== Shot Put ====
- Only top eight final results shown; no prelims are listed

Rank	Name	University	Distance	Notes
1st place, gold medalist(s)	Joachim Olsen Denmark	Idaho	20.26 m (66 ft 5 1/2 in)	
2nd place, silver medalist(s)	Janus Robberts South Africa	SMU	20.19 m (66 ft 2 3/4 in)	
3rd place, bronze medalist(s)	Jim Roberts	BYU	20.09 m (65 ft 10 3/4 in)	
4	Reese Hoffa	Georgia	19.79 m (64 ft 11 in)	
5	Jarred Rome	Boise State	19.33 m (63 ft 5 in)	
6	Anders Holmstrom	Wisconsin	18.91 m (62 ft 1/4 in)	
7	Jason Gervais Canada	Wyoming	18.90 m (62 ft 0 in)	
8	Mark Hoxmeier	Boise State	18.89 m (61 ft 11 1/2 in)	
9	Jason Hammond	Wyoming	18.42 m (60 ft 5 in)	
10	Scott Denbo	Princeton	18.37 m (60 ft 3 in)	

==== Discus ====
- Only top eight final results shown; no prelims are listed

Rank	Name	University	Distance	Notes
1st place, gold medalist(s)	Gábor Máté Hungary	Auburn	65.74 m (215 ft 8 in)	
2nd place, silver medalist(s)	Jason Gervais Canada	Wyoming	62.82 m (206 ft 1 in)	
3rd place, bronze medalist(s)	Reedus Thurmond	Auburn	62.06 m (203 ft 7 1/4 in)	
4	Tolga Koseoglu	Texas A&M	62.02 m (203 ft 5 1/2 in)	
5	Casey Malone	Colorado State	61.44 m (201 ft 6 3/4 in)	
6	Nick Petrucci	Northern Arizona	61.12 m (200 ft 6 1/4 in)	
7	Jarred Rome	Boise State	61.00 m (200 ft 1 1/2 in)	
8	Mark Hoxmeier	Boise State	60.32 m (197 ft 10 3/4 in)	
9	Ian Waltz	Washington State	58.72 m (192 ft 7 3/4 in)	
10	Janus Robberts South Africa	SMU	58.64 m (192 ft 4 1/2 in)	

==== Hammer Throw ====
- Only top eight final results shown; no prelims are listed

Rank	Name	University	Distance	Notes
1st place, gold medalist(s)	Libor Charfreitag Slovakia	SMU	77.22 m (253 ft 4 in)	
2nd place, silver medalist(s)	Andras Haklits Croatia	Georgia	76.28 m (250 ft 3 in)	
3rd place, bronze medalist(s)	Janne Vartia	UTEP	71.90 m (235 ft 10 1/2 in)	
4	James Parker	Utah State	71.80 m (235 ft 6 3/4 in)	
5	Norbert Horvath	USC	70.68 m (231 ft 10 1/2 in)	
6	Erick Kingston	Virginia Tech	67.56 m (221 ft 7 3/4 in)	
7	Tom Barrett	Illinois St.	65.34 m (214 ft 4 1/4 in)	
8	Matthew Kavanagh	Kentucky	65.28 m (214 ft 2 in)	
9	Javier Nieto	LSU	63.64 m (208 ft 9 1/2 in)	
10	Chris Brown	Purdue	62.50 m (205 ft 1/2 in)	

==== Javelin Throw ====
- Only top eight final results shown; no prelims are listed

Rank	Name	University	Distance	Notes
1st place, gold medalist(s)	Esko Mikkola Finland	Arizona	72.62 m (238 ft 3 in)	
2nd place, silver medalist(s)	Brian Kollar	Virginia	72.20 m (236 ft 10 1/2 in)	
3rd place, bronze medalist(s)	Kestutis Celiesius	N. Carolina	71.44 m (234 ft 4 1/2 in)	
4	Mats Nilsson	UTEP	71.32 m (233 ft 11 3/4 in)	
5	Latrell Frederick	N.W. State	70.18 m (230 ft 2 3/4 in)	
6	Justin St.Clair	Washington	68.04 m (223 ft 2 1/2 in)	
7	Kevin Bateman	Florida Int.	66.86 m (219 ft 4 1/4 in)	
8	Blake Theriot	LSU	66.60 m (218 ft 6 in)	
9	Ron White	E. Illinois	66.54 m (218 ft 3 1/2 in)	
10	Nathan Junius	Tulane	66.44 m (217 ft 11 1/2 in)	

==== Decathlon ====
Rank	Name	University	Score	Notes
1st place, gold medalist(s)	Bevan Hart	California	8002	
2nd place, silver medalist(s)	Claston Bernard Jamaica	LSU	7806	
3rd place, bronze medalist(s)	Boris Kawohl	Tennessee	7788	
4	Stephen Harris	Tennessee	7651	
5	Santiago Lorenzo Argentina	Oregon	7543	
6	Curtis Pugsley	BYU	7531	
7	Jacob Predmore	Washington	7426	
8	Jason Wilson	So. Miss.	7310	
9	Aaron Moser	Miami - Fla.	7273	
10	Scott Wenholz	Fresno State	7235	

=== Women's events ===
==== w100 meters ====
- Final results shown, not prelims

-0.4

Rank	Name	University	Time	Notes
1st place, gold medalist(s)	Angela Williams	USC	11.12	
2nd place, silver medalist(s)	Peta-Gaye Dowdie Jamaica	LSU	11.23	
3rd place, bronze medalist(s)	Tonya Carter	Florida St.	11.30	
4	Brianna Glenn	Arizona	11.47	
5	Shaunta Pelham	Florida A&M	11.49	
6	Shakedia Jones	UCLA	11.55	
7	SaDonna Thornton	LSU	11.57	
8	LaKeesha White	Texas	11.65	

==== w200 meters ====
- Final results shown, not prelims

0.7)

Rank	Name	University	Time	Notes
1st place, gold medalist(s)	Peta-Gaye Dowdie Jamaica	LSU	22.51	
2nd place, silver medalist(s)	Kinshasa Davis	USC	22.79	
3rd place, bronze medalist(s)	Shaunta Pelham	Florida A&M	23.09	
4	Michele Davis	UNLV	23.14	
5	Valma Bass United States Virgin Islands	LSU	23.26	
6	Aleah Williams	Texas	23.62	
-	LaKeesha White	Texas	DNF	

==== w400 meters ====
- Final results shown, not prelims

Rank	Name	University	Time	Notes
1st place, gold medalist(s)	Mikele Barber	South Carolina	51.14	
2nd place, silver medalist(s)	Demetria Washington	South Carolina	51.82	
3rd place, bronze medalist(s)	Christine Amertil Bahamas	SE Louisiana	52.13	
4	Barbara Petrahn Hungary	Baylor	52.37	
5	Carolyn Jackson	Arizona	52.58	
6	Debbie Dunn	Norfolk	52.67	
7	Michele Davis	UNLV	52.68	
8	Lesley Owusu	Nebraska	53.30	

==== w800 meters ====
- Final results shown, not prelims

Rank	Name	University	Time	Notes
1st place, gold medalist(s)	Tytti Reho	SMU	2:01.43	
2nd place, silver medalist(s)	Chantee Earl	Pittsburgh	2:02.54	
3rd place, bronze medalist(s)	Ashley Wysong	Missouri	2:02.94	
4	Shaquandra Roberson	Rice	2:03.23	
5	Sasha Spencer	Georgetown	2:03.36	
6	Melanie Steere	BYU	2:03.40	
7	Alishia Booterbaugh	Wash. State	2:04.81	
8	Brigita Langerholc Slovenia	USC	2:05.04	

==== w1500 meters ====
- Final results shown, not prelims

Rank	Name	University	Time	Notes
1st place, gold medalist(s)	Susan Taylor	BYU	4:13.03	
2nd place, silver medalist(s)	Carmen Douma Canada	Villanova	4:16.09	
3rd place, bronze medalist(s)	Anna Lopaciuch	USC	4:16.75	
4	Shaquandra Roberson	Rice	4:17.27	
5	Lauren Fleshman	Stanford	4:17.76	
6	Steephanie Pesch	Wisconsin	4:19.13	
7	Katie Crabb	Oregon	4:19.30	
8	Lisa Aguilera	Arizona St.	4:20.67	
9	Hanne Lyngstad	Tulane	4:21.01	
10	Jill Snyder	Wake Forest	4:23.85	

==== 3000 meters ====
- Final results shown, not prelims

Rank	Name	University	Time	Notes
1st place, gold medalist(s)	Kara Wheeler	Colorado	9:02.15	
2nd place, silver medalist(s)	Korene Hinds Jamaica	Kansas State	9:10.10	
3rd place, bronze medalist(s)	Carrie Tollefson	Villanova	9:16.48	
4	Jessica Dailey	Arkansas	9:16.93	
5	Sally Glynn	Stanford	9:17.81	
6	Shannon Smith	Boston Coll.	9:17.89	
7	Kathleen Linck	Georgetown	9:23.72	
8	Lesley Higgins	Colorado	9:24.32	
9	Hanna Smedstad	Oklahoma St.	9:25.03	
10	Michelle Brooks	Nebraska	9:27.45	

==== w5000 meters ====
- Final results shown, not prelims

Rank	Name	University	Time	Notes
1st place, gold medalist(s)	Kara Wheeler	Colorado	15:54.30	
2nd place, silver medalist(s)	Amy Yoder	Arkansas	16:05.70	
3rd place, bronze medalist(s)	Amy Mortimer	Kansas State	16:07.26	
4	Marty Hernandez	BYU	16:11.90	
5	Maria-Elena Calle	VCU	16:15.24	
6	Jessica Dailey	Arkansas	16:16.05	
7	Janelle Kraus	Wake Forest	16:17.32	
8	Catherine Berry	E. Tenn. St.	16:18.07	
9	Kathryn Ireland	Boston U.	16:22.96	
10	Erica Palmer	Wisconsin	16:27.11	

==== w10,000 meters ====
- Final results shown, not prelims

Rank	Name	University	Time	Notes
1st place, gold medalist(s)	Tara Rohatinsky	BYU	33:49.24	
2nd place, silver medalist(s)	Marty Hernandez	BYU	33:50.45	
3rd place, bronze medalist(s)	Amy Yoder	Arkansas	33:53.76	
4	Jen Gruia	Colorado	33:55.18	
5	Erica Palmer	Wisconsin	34:13.79	
6	Jennifer Denkins	Michigan St.	34:15.27	
7	Abby Peters	Boise State	34:19.93	
8	Keely Weaver	Belmont	34:21.38	
9	Anna Aoki	Washington	34:22.79	
10	Heather Tanner	N. Carolina	34:23.13	

==== 100 meters hurdles ====
- Final results shown, not prelims

0.8)

Rank	Name	University	Time	Notes
1st place, gold medalist(s)	Joyce Bates	LSU	12.85	
2nd place, silver medalist(s)	Jenny Adams	Houston	12.91	
3rd place, bronze medalist(s)	Donica Merriman	Ohio State	12.92	
4	Kirstin Bolm	BYU	12.93	
5	Brandit Copper	Alabama	13.03	
6	Perdita Felicien Canada	Illinois	13.07	
7	Kyla Shoemaker	Arkansas	13.15	
8	Ellakisha Williamson	South Carolina	13.43	

==== w400 meters hurdles ====
Rank	Name	University	Time	Notes
1st place, gold medalist(s)	Natasha Danvers United Kingdom	USC	55.26	
2nd place, silver medalist(s)	Tanya Jarrett	Texas	55.67	
3rd place, bronze medalist(s)	Petagay Gayle	Alabama	55.93	
4	Michelle Perry	UCLA	56.50	
5	Angel Patterson	Texas	56.73	
6	Saidat Onanuga Nigeria	UTEP	56.83	
7	Brenda Taylor	Harvard	57.77	
8	Dominque Calloway	Ohio State	58.99	

==== w4x100-meter relay ====
- Final results shown, not prelims

Rank	University	Time	Notes
1st place, gold medalist(s)	USC	43.14	
2nd place, silver medalist(s)	LSU	43.16	
3rd place, bronze medalist(s)	South Carolina	43.65	
4	Texas	43.86	
5	Illinois	44.32	
6	Baylor	44.45	
7	Indiana	44.49	
8	South Florida	44.65	

==== w4x400-meter relay ====
- Final results shown, not prelims

Rank	University	Time	Notes
1st place, gold medalist(s)	South Carolina	3:28.64	
2nd place, silver medalist(s)	Texas	3:30.05	
3rd place, bronze medalist(s)	USC	3:30.89	
4	Pittsburgh	3:33.23	
5	Georgetown	3:33.91	
6	Baylor	3:35.24	
7	LSU	3:35.98	
8	Oklahoma	3:37.04	

==== wHigh Jump ====
- Only top eight final results shown; no prelims are listed

Rank	Name	University	Height	Notes
1st place, gold medalist(s)	Erin Aldrich	Texas	1.90 m (6 ft 2 3/4 in)	
2nd place, silver medalist(s)	Dóra Győrffy Hungary	Harvard	1.87 m (6 ft 1 1/2 in)	
3rd place, bronze medalist(s)	Carrie Braness	Nebraska	1.84 m (6 ft 1/4 in)	
4	Jeana Bingham	BYU	1.81 m (5 ft 11 1/4 in)	
5	Joy Ganes	N. Carolina	1.81 m (5 ft 11 1/4 in)	
6	Carri Long	Purdue	1.81 m (5 ft 11 1/4 in)	
7	Ifoma Jones	Houston	1.81 m (5 ft 11 1/4 in)	
7	Jennifer Engelhardt	Notre Dame	1.81 m (5 ft 11 1/4 in)	
7	Tayyiba Haneef	Long Beach	1.81 m (5 ft 11 1/4 in)	
10	Tamika Toppin	Connecticut	1.77 m (5 ft 9 1/2 in)	

==== wPole Vault ====
- Only top ten final results shown; no prelims are listed

Rank	Name	University	Height	Notes
1st place, gold medalist(s)	Tracy O'Hara	UCLA	4.40 m (14 ft 5 in)	
2nd place, silver medalist(s)	Erin Anderson	Kansas State	4.20 m (13 ft 9 1/4 in)	
3rd place, bronze medalist(s)	Jillian Schwartz	Duke	4.10 m (13 ft 5 1/4 in)	
4	Shae Bair	Utah State	4.10 m (13 ft 5 1/4 in)	
5	Dena Dial	Oral Roberts	4.00 m (13 ft 1 1/4 in)	
6	Andrea Neary	Arizona	4.00 m (13 ft 1 1/4 in)	
7	Rhian Clarke	Houston	4.00 m (13 ft 1 1/4 in)	
8	Maria Lopez	California	4.00 m (13 ft 1 1/4 in)	
9	Andrea Wildrick	Liberty	4.00 m (13 ft 1 1/4 in)	
9	Andrea Branson	Kansas	4.00 m (13 ft 1 1/4 in)	

==== wLong Jump ====
- Only top eight final results shown; no prelims are listed

Rank	Name	University	Distance	Wind	Notes
1st place, gold medalist(s)	Jenny Adams	Houston	6.54 m (21 ft 5 1/4 in)	+1.4	
2nd place, silver medalist(s)	Nolle Graham	Seton Hall	6.53 m (21 ft 5 in)	+0.9	
3rd place, bronze medalist(s)	Tasha Mahone	Georgia	6.44 m (21 ft 1 1/2 in)	+0.9	
4	Tiffany Greer	Arizona St.	6.42 m (21 ft 3/4 in)	+0.3	
5	Dalhia Ingram	Nebraska	6.36 m (20 ft 10 1/4 in)	+0.5	
6	Keisha Spencer Jamaica	LSU	6.32 m (20 ft 8 3/4 in)	+0.8	
7	Tisha Parker	Mississippi	6.29 m (20 ft 7 1/2 in)	+0.4	
8	Monique Freeman	LSU	6.24 m (20 ft 5 1/2 in)	+0.8	
9	Tameshia King	Notre Dame	6.23 m (20 ft 5 1/4 in)	+1.0	
10	Jada Phelps	Ball State	6.19 m (20 ft 3 1/2 in)	+0.6	

==== wTriple Jump ====
- Only top eight final results shown; no prelims are listed

Rank	Name	University	Distance	Wind	Notes
1st place, gold medalist(s)	Keisha Spencer Jamaica	LSU	13.97 m (45 ft 10 in)	+0.2	
2nd place, silver medalist(s)	Brandi Prieto	CSU Northridge	13.49 m (44 ft 3 in)	+1.4	
3rd place, bronze medalist(s)	Kerine Black	South Florida	13.49 m (44 ft 3 in)	+1.0	
4	Shelly-Ann Gallimore	Auburn	13.48 m (44 ft 2 1/2 in)	+1.1	
5	Dalhia Ingram	Nebraska	13.35 m (43 ft 9 1/2 in)w	+2.1	
6	Andreja Ribac	M. Tenn. St.	13.27 m (43 ft 6 1/4 in)	+1.6	
7	DeAnne Davis	N. Carolina	13.18 m (43 ft 2 3/4 in)	+0.9	
8	Anna Tarasova Kazakhstan	UTEP	13.05 m (42 ft 9 3/4 in)w	+2.3	
9	Asa Lonn	Northern Arizona	12.93 m (42 ft 5 in)	+-0.3	
10	Tatyana Obukhova	USC	12.91 m (42 ft 4 1/4 in)	+-0.8	

==== wShot Put ====
- Only top eight final results shown; no prelims are listed

Rank	Name	University	Distance	Notes
1st place, gold medalist(s)	Seilala Sua	UCLA	17.36 m (56 ft 11 1/4 in)	
2nd place, silver medalist(s)	Cheree Hicks	Syracuse	16.88 m (55 ft 4 1/2 in)	
3rd place, bronze medalist(s)	Rhonda Hackett	Georgia	16.79 m (55 ft 1 in)	
4	Linda Nestorsson	Northern Arizona	16.35 m (53 ft 7 1/2 in)	
5	Christina Tolson	UCLA	16.09 m (52 ft 9 1/4 in)	
6	Aubrey Schmitt	Minnesota	15.73 m (51 ft 7 1/4 in)	
7	Marsha French	UT Arlington	15.62 m (51 ft 2 3/4 in)	
8	Sesilia Thomas	Washington	15.46 m (50 ft 8 1/2 in)	
9	Andrea Pappas	Tennessee	15.37 m (50 ft 5 in)	
10	Safiya Ingram	Alabama	15.26 m (50 ft 3/4 in)	

==== wDiscus ====
- Only top eight final results shown; no prelims are listed

Rank	Name	University	Distance	Notes
1st place, gold medalist(s)	Seilala Sua	UCLA	61.20 m (200 ft 9 1/4 in)	
2nd place, silver medalist(s)	Cheree Hicks	Syracuse	57.00 m (187 ft 0 in)	
3rd place, bronze medalist(s)	Safiya Ingram	Alabama	56.00 m (183 ft 8 1/2 in)	
4	Katja Schreiber	Idaho	54.02 m (177 ft 2 3/4 in)	
5	Robin Lyons	Wyoming	51.72 m (169 ft 8 in)	
6	Liz Toman	Colorado St.	51.60 m (169 ft 3 1/4 in)	
7	Beth Obruba	Kent State	51.28 m (168 ft 2 3/4 in)	
8	Mary Etter	Oregon	50.88 m (166 ft 11 in)	
9	Makiba Batten	Florida St.	50.52 m (165 ft 8 3/4 in)	
10	Gina Lomonaco	St. John's	50.38 m (165 ft 3 1/4 in)	

==== wHammer Throw ====
- Only top eight final results shown; no prelims are listed

Rank	Name	University	Distance	Notes
1st place, gold medalist(s)	Florence Ezeh Togo	SMU	64.58 m (211 ft 10 1/2 in)	
2nd place, silver medalist(s)	Melissa Price	Nebraska	64.24 m (210 ft 9 in)	
3rd place, bronze medalist(s)	Robin Lyons	Wyoming	63.02 m (206 ft 9 in)	
4	Jennifer Joyce Canada	California	62.22 m (204 ft 1 1/2 in)	
5	Christina Tolson	UCLA	62.04 m (203 ft 6 1/2 in)	
6	Jennifer Vail	USC	61.54 m (201 ft 10 3/4 in)	
7	Bethany Hart	Connecticut	60.54 m (198 ft 7 1/4 in)	
8	Cari Soong	UCLA	60.22 m (197 ft 6 3/4 in)	
9	Nancy Guillen El Salvador	SMU	59.20 m (194 ft 2 1/2 in)	
10	Dana Dillon	Wyoming	57.78 m (189 ft 6 3/4 in)	

==== wJavelin Throw ====
- Only top eight final results shown; no prelims are listed

Rank	Name	University	Distance	Notes
1st place, gold medalist(s)	Angeliki Tsiolakoudi Greece	UTEP	60.24 m (197 ft 7 1/2 in)	
2nd place, silver medalist(s)	Emily Carlsten	Florida	55.50 m (182 ft 1 in)	
3rd place, bronze medalist(s)	Katy Doyle	Texas A&M	52.40 m (171 ft 10 3/4 in)	
4	Beth Obruba	Kent State	52.20 m (171 ft 3 in)	
5	Kim Kreiner	Kent State	51.48 m (168 ft 10 3/4 in)	
6	Cassi Morelock	Nebraska	51.38 m (168 ft 6 3/4 in)	
7	Karis Howell	Oregon	51.24 m (168 ft 1 1/4 in)	
8	Candy Mitchell	So. Carolina	50.88 m (166 ft 11 in)	
9	Irina Kharun	Indiana	49.36 m (161 ft 11 1/4 in)	
10	Molly Monroe	Wash. State	48.86 m (160 ft 3 1/2 in)	

==== Heptathlon ====
Rank	Name	University	Score	Notes
1st place, gold medalist(s)	Christi Smith	Akron	5797	
2nd place, silver medalist(s)	G.G. Miller	Arkansas	5777	
3rd place, bronze medalist(s)	Missey Vanek	California	5614	
4	Ifoma Jones	Houston	5593	
5	Dee Brown	Arkansas	5490	
6	Kerry O'Bric	Baylor	5464	
7	Andrea Geurtsen	Wisconsin	5442	
8	Katherine Nielsen	Illinois St.	5438	
9	Barbara Szlendakova	Iowa State	5382	
10	Frenke Bolt	Tennessee	5341	
