= Geir Kvernmo =

Norwegian long-distance runner

Personal information
- Nationality: Norwegian
- Born: 29 October 1955 (age 70) Trondheim, Norway

Sport
- Sport: Long-distance running
- Event: Marathon

Geir Kvernmo (born 29 October 1955) is a Norwegian long-distance runner. He competed in the men's marathon at the 1988 Summer Olympics.

Kvernmo was an All-American runner for the Wyoming Cowboys track and field team, finishing 3rd in the 10,000 meters at the 1980 NCAA Division I Outdoor Track and Field Championships.
