= Mark Korir =

Kenyan long-distance runner

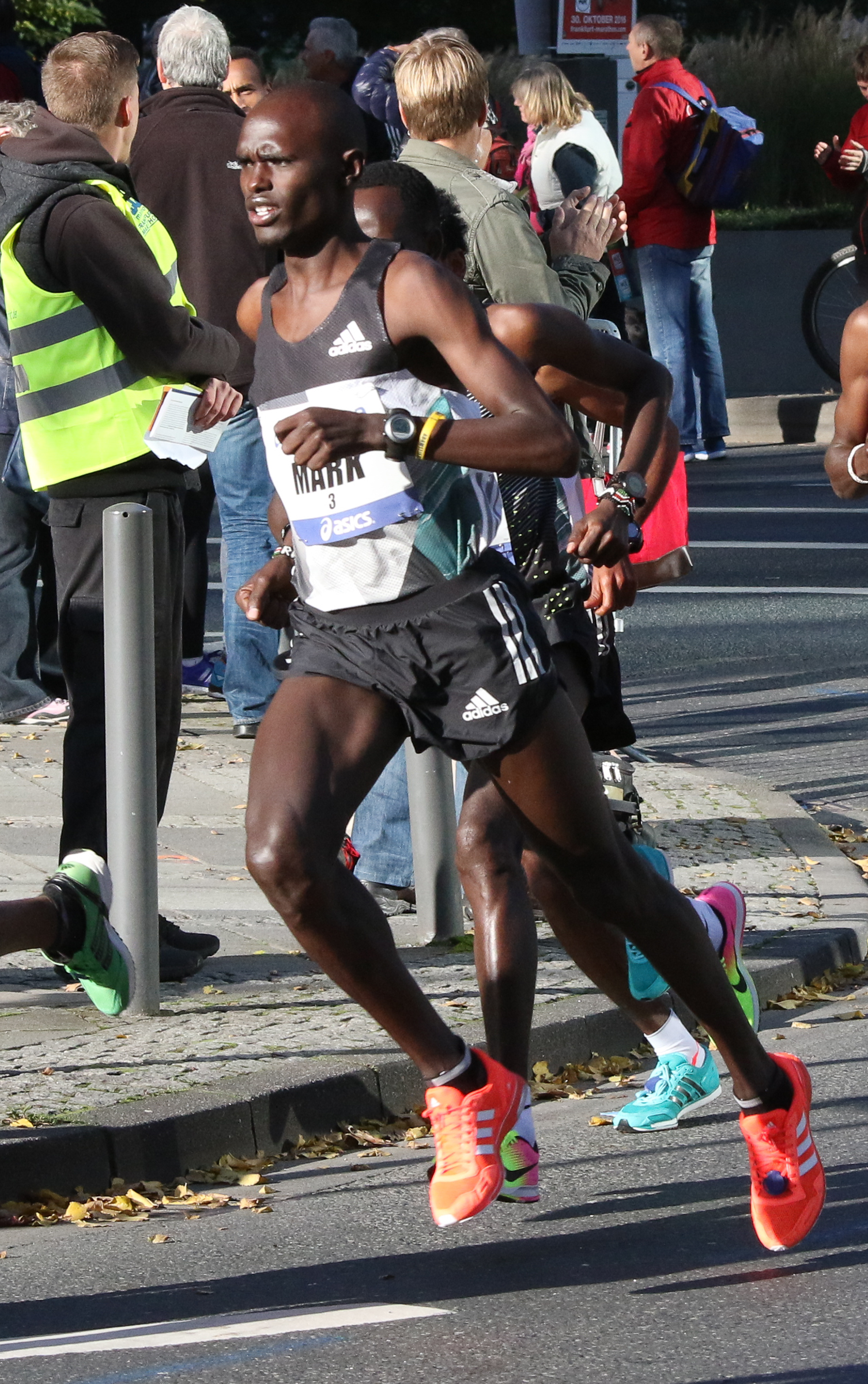
- During the Frankfurt Marathon 2016

Personal information
- Born: 10 January 1985 (age 41)

Sport
- Country: Kenya
- Sport: Track and field
- Event: Marathon

Mark Korir (born 10 January 1985) is a Kenyan long-distance runner who specialises in the marathon. He competed in the marathon event at the 2015 World Championships in Athletics in Beijing, China.

Korir was an All-American runner for the Wyoming Cowboys track and field team, finishing 4th in the 5000 metres at the 2008 NCAA Division I Indoor Track and Field Championships.
