= Steven Fein =

Steven Fein is a professor of psychology in the Department of Psychology at Williams College in Williamstown, Massachusetts. Fein has two daughters named Alina and Hannah.

He attended Princeton and the University of Michigan, where he received his Ph.D. in social psychology. His primary research interests are stereotypes and prejudice, suspicion and attribution theory, and how the media affects both men and women’s views of women.

== Experiments ==
One of Fein’s experiments, Hype and suspicion, examined the effects of pretrial publicity (PTP) on prejudice in jurors. In the context of the OJ Simpson trial, mock jurors were exposed to PTP, after which they tended to vote “guilty.” However, when the PTP indicated that the defendant was African American, the jurors became suspicious of a racist motive within the publicity.

Another study by Fein and Spencer argued that self-image affects stereotypes and prejudice. They found that participants whose self-image was reinforced were less likely to view a member of a stereotyped group as negative. On the other hand, when self-image was threatened, those participants tended to degrade the stereotyped member, which bolstered their self-image. Also, he has studied culture/ethnicity, media influences, interpersonal processes, self/identity, self-affirmation theory and social cognition.

Fein also conducted a series of experiments that demonstrated how people's perceptions of political candidates can be influenced dramatically by the reactions of others around them. For example, in one experiment, subjects watched a tape of a Presidential debate between Ronald Reagan and Walter Mondale. In one condition, there was no manipulation of the tape. In another condition, two brief, amusing "soundbites" by Reagan that got a very positive audience reaction were edited out. In a third condition, the soundbites were left in, but the audience reaction was edited out. In the unedited condition, the large majority of subjects thought Reagan's debate performance was superior to Mondale's. In the condition in which the soundbites were cut out, the preference for Reagan was completely eliminated, showing how strong an effect a couple of jokes were to influence overall perceptions of a 90-minute-long debate. But the results were even more dramatic for the third condition. Here, with the soundbites left in, but the audience reaction cut out, the subjects overwhelmingly thought Mondale's overall debate performance was superior to Reagan's. This demonstrated that it wasn't what Reagan actually said that made the difference, but rather the perceptions of the audience's reaction to what he said that had the biggest impact. Without the validation of the audience's laughter and applause, Reagan's one-liners flopped rather than soared, and viewers were affected significantly by that. This work was cited during the 2008 presidential debates between Barack Obama and John McCain when CNN showed a graph reflecting the reactions of a group of undecided voters live during the debates; Fein was quoted in numerous stories criticizing CNN for potentially influencing numerous voters in this way.

== Publications ==
Other publications by Fein include research on the role of arousal in stereotype threat, suspicion and the fundamental attribution error, and a study testing whether measuring the personalities of new medical students could predict what area of medicine they would specialize in several years later. His two most cited papers are Steven Fein and Steven J. Spencer "Prejudice as Self-image Maintenance: Affirming the Self Through Derogating Others" in Journal of Personality and Social Psychology 1997 Vol. 73, No. 1,31-44 (cited 932 times according to Google Scholar) and SJ Spencer, S Fein, CT Wolfe, C Fong "Automatic activation of stereotypes: The role of self-image threat" in Personality and Social Psychology Bulletin November 1998 vol. 24 no. 11 1139-1152 (cited 308 times)

In addition to the text Social Psychology, Fein co wrote other books including Readings in social psychology: The art and science of research with Saul Kassin and Motivated social perception: The Ontario symposium, with S. J. Spencer, M. Zanna, and J. M. Olsen. He has also represented the American Psychological Association as well as the committee of the Society of Personality and Social Psychology.

Fein also has co-hosted "Live From E Street Nation" with Dave Marsh on Sirius-XM's "E Street Radio" station on several occasions. One two of these occasions he has had the LA-based rock band, The Airborne Toxic Event, come on to the show for extensive interviews and live performances.
