= Seneca Lassiter =

American middle-distance runner

Personal information
- Nationality: American
- Born: March 12, 1977 (age 49) Williamsburg, Virginia, U.S.

Sport
- Sport: Track
- Events: 800m, 1500m, mile, 5000m
- College team: Arkansas

Achievements and titles
- Personal bests: 800m: 1:45.51; 1500m: 3:33.72; Indoor mile: 3:54.21; 5000m: 13:39.82

Seneca Lassiter (born 12 March 1977) is an American former middle-distance runner who specialized in the 1500 meters. As a high schooler running for Lafayette of Williamsburg, Virginia, he won National Scholastic indoor and outdoor championships for the mile and 800 meter run. In collegiate competition he ran for University of Arkansas, which was recognized for its prestigious track program which in Lassiter's time included recruits such as Sharif Karie. Lassiter ran professionally for Nike after his college spell.

== Running career ==
=== High school ===
Lassiter ran for Lafayette High School in Williamsburg, Virginia. As a junior in 1994, he won both the National Scholastic indoor and outdoor mile run championships. He again won the National Scholastic indoor as a senior in 1995 and won the 800 meters at the USA Juniors.

=== Collegiate ===
Lassiter ran collegiately for the University of Arkansas under coach John McDonnell where he won the NCAA Outdoor 1500 m in 1997 and 1998 and was 2nd in 1999. Lassiter finished 2nd in the NCAA Indoor Mile in 1997 and 3rd in 1998 and 1999. He was named most outstanding performer among collegiate men at the Penn Relays in both 1997 and 1999.

In 1997, Lassiter won the 1500 meters at the USATF Outdoor National Championships. While still a collegian, he was ranked as the number 2 1500 meter runner in the US by Track and Field News magazine after both the 1997 and 1999 seasons.

=== Post-collegiate ===
Lassiter continued running for Nike following the completion of his college eligibility.

In 2001, Lassiter won the mile at the USA Indoor Track and Field Championships and followed that by finishing sixth at the 2001 IAAF World Indoor Championships in Lisbon, Portugal. He then finished second in the 1500 meters at the USATF Outdoor Championships in the same year. He was again ranked #2 in the US by Track and Field News at the completion of the season.

Lassiter had another strong season in 2002, again winning the 1500 meters at the USATF Outdoor National Championships and again ranking #2 in the US.

In 2002, Lassiter admitted to serving as a pacemaker in the 1500-meters for then-Kenyan Bernard Lagat at the World Cup competition. Lassiter and Lagat were training partners at the time and Lassiter’s actions took him out of the running in the race and eliminated a chance for the US team to score more points in the team competition. Lassiter later issued an apology to the team and was sanctioned by the USATF for his actions, requiring him to complete 20 hours of community service and receiving a letter of reprimand. Lassiter then began coaching at Springdale High School in Springdale Arkansas

== Rankings ==
Lassiter was ranked among the top ten 1500 meter runners in the US by Track and Field News for six straight years:

Year	Event	US rank
1997	1500 meters	2nd
1998	1500 meters	9th
1999	1500 meters	2nd
2000	1500 meters	6th
2001	1500 meters	2nd
2002	1500 meters	2nd
