= Sharif Karie =

American former middle-distance runner (born 1978)

Personal information
- Nationality: Somali; American
- Born: January 1, 1978 (age 48) Mogadishu, Somalia

Sport
- Sport: Track
- Events: 800m, 1500m, mile, 5000m
- College team: Arkansas

Achievements and titles
- Personal bests: 800m: 1:49.21; 1500m: 3:41.10; Indoor mile: 3:59.60; 5000m: 13:46.13

Sharif Karie (born January 1, 1978) is an American former middle-distance runner who was prolific in high school and collegiate competition for various middle and long-distance disciplines. Born in Mogadishu, Karie left Somalia in August 1993, went to Lansing, Michigan, to live with a brother, then settled in Springfield, Virginia. He attended and competed in track for West Springfield High School, then Lindenwood University, and finally the University of Arkansas.

== Running career ==
=== High school ===
Karie first competed for West Springfield High School, which he attended from the summer of 1993. In the spring of 1994, Karie ran his first high school mile race in 4:40 (min:sec). Less than two years later, Karie beat Seneca Lassiter in the 1995 VHSL Indoor State Championships for the 3200 meter race, running a time of 9:21.07. Topping off the end of his time with West Springfield High, Karie was named Gatorade track athlete of the year in 1997. Karie is recorded in the all-time top 25 Virginia high school track runners for disciplines varying from the indoor 1000 meters, 1600 meters, and 3200 meters.

=== Collegiate ===
For a brief period Karie went to Lindenwood University, but would develop his collegiate track career with University of Arkansas, which was again becoming a recognized track school in the era of coach John McDonnell. High school rival Seneca Lassiter was one of Karie's team mates on the Arkansas track team. On April 24, 1999, Karie along with Arkansas teammates Lassiter, Michael Power and Matthew Kerr ran a 4 x 1-mile relay in a time of 16:07.96, the seventh fastest time recorded for this relay distance.
