= Adam Connolly =

English footballer

Personal information
- Full name: Adam James Connolly
- Date of birth: 10 April 1986 (age 40)
- Place of birth: Manchester, England
- Height: 1.80 m (5 ft 11 in)
- Position: Midfielder

Team information
- Current team: Gloucester City

Youth career
- Cheltenham Town

Senior career*
Years	Team	Apps	(Gls)
2004–2008	Cheltenham Town	32	(1)
2008	Hednesford Town	2	(0)
2008–2014	Bath City	73	(4)
2014–	Gloucester City	26	(1)
- * Club domestic league appearances and goals as of 10 May 2010

Adam James Connolly (born 10 April 1986) is an English footballer who plays for Southern League Premier Division South club Gloucester City. He played in the Football League for Cheltenham Town.

== Career ==
A product of the Cheltenham Town Youth System, Connolly made his way through the ranks at Whaddon Road, signing as a professional in the summer of 2004. He made his debut on 1 April 2005 in a 2–1 defeat to Boston United and appeared a handful of times for the Robins in his first season, gradually making more appearances over the next two years. In 2007–2008, he appeared 15 times in League One, mainly as a substitute.

After ending the 2007–2008 season, he was released by Cheltenham. He spent time on trial at Newport County, but instead signed for Hednesford Town after impressing in their friendly with Rangers while on trial. However, he failed to settle at the side and left after making just two appearances, signing for Bath City.

In July 2014, he signed for Gloucester City.

== Career statistics ==
As of 10 May 2010

Club statistics
Club	Season	League		National Cup		League Cup		Other		Total	
Club	Season	App	Goals	App	Goals	App	Goals	App	Goals	App	Goals
Cheltenham Town	2004–05	4	0	0	0	0	0	0	0	4	0
Cheltenham Town	2005–06	5	1	0	0	0	0	1	1	6	2
Cheltenham Town	2006–07	8	0	0	0	0	0	0	0	8	0
Cheltenham Town	2007–08	15	0	2	0	0	0	2	0	19	0
Cheltenham Town	Subtotal	32	1	2	0	0	0	3	1	37	2
Hednesford Town	2008–09	2	0	0	0	0	0	0	0	2	0
Bath City	2008–09	31	1	0	0	0	0	4	0	35	1
Bath City	2009–10	42	3	0	0	0	0	9	1	51	4
Bath City	Subtotal	73	4	0	0	0	0	13	1	86	5
Total		107	5	2	0	0	0	16	2	125	7

== Honours ==
Bath City

- Conference South play-off winner: 2009–10
