= Jason Gervais =

Canadian discus thrower

Personal information
- Born: 18 January 1976 (age 50) Timmins, Ontario, Canada

Sport
- Sport: Athletics
- Event: Discus throw

Jason Gervais (born 18 January 1976) is a Canadian athlete. He competed in the men's discus throw at the 2000 Summer Olympics.

Gervais was an All-American thrower for the Wyoming Cowboys track and field team, finishing runner-up in the discus throw at the 2000 NCAA Division I Outdoor Track and Field Championships. He was also an All-American in the weight throw and shot put.
