= Leigh Daniel =

American distance runner

Personal information
- Nationality: American
- Born: August 6, 1978 (age 48) Lubbock, Texas, U.S.
- Height: 1.62 m (5.3 ft)

Sport
- Sport: Running
- Events: 5000 metres, 10000 metres, marathon
Medal record
Representing United States
Women's athletics
Summer Universiade
Gold medal – first place	1999 Palma	10,000 metres
NCAA Division I Championships
Gold medal – first place	1999 Indoor	5000 metres
Gold medal – first place	1999 Outdoor	10,000 metres
Silver medal – second place	1999 Outdoor	5000 metres
Bronze medal – third place	2001 Outdoor	10,000 metres

Leigh Daniel (born August 6, 1978, in Lubbock, Texas) is the former head coach of the women's cross country program and assistant track and field coach at Ashland University in Ohio (2005-2010). She also is an American track athlete specializing in long-distance running and fitness trainer in Lubbock.

== Collegiate Running career ==
During her days as a college athlete at Texas Tech, Daniel had several top-three finishes in NCAA championship races and won numerous titles in the Big 12 Conference. Daniel's victory in the 1999 NCAA outdoor 10000 metres immediately took on legendary status among track and field observers, as one of her shoes came off during the race and she had to stop to put it back on, thus ceding an estimated 120 metres to her opponents.

== TODAY Throws a Wedding contest ==
On July 1, 2009, Daniel and fiancé Nick Cordes won first place in the TODAY contest TODAY Throws a Wedding. As a result, the two wed on July 15, 2009, in a ceremony televised on TODAY.
