= John McDonnell (coach) =

American track and field coach (1938–2021)

- McDonnell in 2008

Biographical details
- Born: July 2, 1938; County Mayo, Ireland
- Died: June 7, 2021 (aged 82); Fayetteville, Arkansas

Playing career
- 1965–1969: Southwestern Louisiana
- Positions: 3,000 meters, mile

Coaching career (HC unless noted)
- 1969–1970: New Providence (NJ) HS
- 1971: Lafayette (LA) HS
- 1972–2008: Arkansas

Accomplishments and honors

Championships
- NCAA Championships: 40; NCAA Triple Crowns: 5 SWC Championships: 38; SEC Championships: 46

Awards
- 30-time national coach of the year 49-time conference coach of the year 62-time region coach of the year

John McDonnell (July 2, 1938 – June 7, 2021) was a head coach for the University of Arkansas Razorbacks track team. He began as the cross country and track head coach for the university in 1972 and became head track coach in 1978. McDonnell retired after the 2008 NCAA Outdoor Championships. He is considered by many to be the single most successful head coach (any sport) in collegiate athletics history.

== Legacy ==
In 2005, Coach John McDonnell was inducted to the National Track & Field Hall of Fame.

On February 27, 2013, a published autobiography of the life and works of John McDonnell was officially declared a co-authorship between John McDonnell and Andrew Maloney. Titled, John McDonnell: The Most Successful Coach in NCAA History, the University of Arkansas Press publication chronicles the timeline of McDonnell's life, starting at the early beginnings of the famed sports figure's childhood growing up in his beloved native Ireland where he championed record-breaking success as a track star and gained a level of global attention that eventually sparked a life-changing call to move to the United States where he would successfully represent America on the track.

== Early life ==
McDonnell earned his bachelor's degree from Southwestern Louisiana University (now Louisiana-Lafayette) in 1969. While competing to become a six-time all-American in track and cross country at USL, he became the 1966–67 AAU 3,000-meter champion, and won the mile at the 1966 British Selection Games.

He coached at New Providence (N.J.) High School (1969–70) and Lafayette (La.) High School (1971) before coming to the University of Arkansas.

== Coaching accomplishments at Arkansas ==
McDonnell was hired as the cross country coach in 1972 and added the entire men's track and field program in 1978.

Coach McDonnell led the track team to their first national championship at the 1984 NCAA Indoor Championships while the school was a member of the now-defunct Southwest Conference. Since then, the University of Arkansas has won 40 NCAA championships, including 11 cross country, 19 indoor track and 10 outdoor track. Other schools have won only 24 combined NCAA titles in the three sports during the same period.

McDonnell's 40 national championships (which include 19 in indoor track, 10 in outdoor track and 11 in cross country) are more than any coach in any sport in the history of college athletics. The next highest is 31 by Pat Henry, former LSU and current track coach at Texas A&M University.

McDonnell also won five national triple crowns (in 1984-85, 1991–92, 1992–93, 1994–95 and 1998–99). Texas-El Paso has won three national triple crowns. No other school has ever won one.

In addition, McDonnell's team and individual achievements include:

- 20 conference triple crowns since 1982, including eight straight between 1987 and 1995
- 25 consecutive conference titles in cross country with indoor track and outdoor track combined from 1987 to 1995
- 73 conference championships in the last 77 events Arkansas has entered since 1981-1982
- 84 conference championships overall since 1974 including 38 in the SWC and 46 in the SEC (out of a possible 50, or 90 percent)
- 12 consecutive NCAA indoor track championships (1984–1995)
- coached 185 track All-Americans, earning 652 separate All-America honors
- 34 consecutive league cross country championships, including 17 straight in the SEC (1974–2007)
- 54 individual national champions
- 23 Olympians coached spanning three decades and six different Olympic Games including gold, silver and bronze medalists
- his 1994 indoor track squad won the national championship by the widest margins in the history of the sport as well as scored the most points (94) in the history of the NCAA event
- his 1994 squad scored a meet record 223 points at the SEC Outdoor Championships
- has been named national, regional or conference coach of the year a total of 140 times
- has coached 23 Olympians, including gold, silver and bronze medalists, 105 NCAA individual event champions and 331 individual event conference champions

The Razorback outdoor track facility on the campus of the University of Arkansas is named in his honor. McDonnell has been inducted as a member of the United States Track Coaches Hall of Fame, the University of Arkansas Sports Hall of Honor, the Arkansas Sports Hall of Fame, the University of Southwestern Louisiana Sports Hall of Fame and the Mayo Hall of Fame.

== Personal life ==
McDonnell was granted United States citizenship in 1969, the same year he graduated from the University of Southwestern Louisiana.

After retiring, McDonnell enjoyed spending time on his 2,500-acre (10 km^{2}) cattle ranch in Pryor, Oklahoma. He owned over 650 head of cattle. McDonnell was also involved with several non-profit organizations, including the American Heart Association and the Central Arkansas Radiation Therapy Institute and he worked closely with the University of Arkansas for Medical Sciences to promote prostate cancer awareness. He was married to the former Ellen Elias of Bayonne, New Jersey and has two children, Heather and Sean.

McDonnell died in Fayetteville on June 7, 2021.
