= Oklahoma State Cowboys track and field =

Track and field program of the Oklahoma State University

- University: Oklahoma State University
- Head coach: Dave Smith (16th season)
- Conference: Big 12
- Location: Stillwater, Oklahoma, US
- Indoor track: OSU Track and Field Complex
- Outdoor track: OSU Track and Field Complex
- Nickname: Cowboys
- Colors: Orange and black

NCAA Indoor Tournament Appearances
- 1965, 1966, 1967, 1969, 1970, 1971, 1973, 1974, 1982, 1983, 1984, 1985, 1986, 1989, 1995, 1996, 1997, 1999, 2001, 2003, 2004, 2010, 2012, 2013, 2014, 2015, 2016, 2017, 2018, 2019, 2022, 2023, 2024, 2025, 2026

NCAA Outdoor Tournament Appearances
- 1929, 1931, 1932, 1938, 1939, 1940, 1941, 1942, 1946, 1955, 1956, 1957, 1958, 1959, 1960, 1961, 1963, 1964, 1965, 1966, 1967, 1970, 1971, 1972, 1973, 1980, 1981, 1982, 1983, 1984, 1985, 1986, 1994, 1995, 1996, 1997, 1998, 1999, 2000, 2008, 2009, 2010, 2012, 2013, 2014, 2015, 2016, 2017, 2019, 2021, 2022, 2023, 2024, 2025, 2026

Conference Indoor Championships
- Big 12; 2014, 2016

Conference Outdoor Championships
- Missouri Valley; 1929, 1932, 1934, 1938, 1939, 1940, 1941, 1942, 1946, 1947, 1948, 1949, 1950, 1951, 1952, 1953, 1954, 1955, 1956, 1957

The Oklahoma State Cowboys track and field program represents the Oklahoma State University in the sport of track and field. The program competes in Division I of the National Collegiate Athletic Association (NCAA) and the Big 12. The Cowboys host their home indoor and outdoor meets at the OSU Track and Field Complex, both located on the university's Stillwater, Oklahoma campus. The Oklahoma State track and field teams are currently led by head coach Dave Smith.

== History ==
=== Indoor history ===
The Oklahoma State men's indoor track and field team was organized in 1926, first competing in the Missouri Valley Conference before moving to the Big Eight Conference. The team finished runner-up at the Missouri Valley conference meet twice, in 1929 and 1937. Ralph Higgins was hired as head coach in 1935 and would go on to lead the Cowboys for 32 years, the longest tenure of any coach in Oklahoma State track and field history.

The program's most successful season came in 1965, when the team claimed a 2nd–place finish in the inaugural NCAA Indoor Track and Field Championship. Along with the runner-up finish, Oklahoma State also won their first individual national titles with Tom Von Ruden in the 880 yards and the two–mile relay team.

Dave Smith took over the track and field program in 2009, with the Cowboys searching for their first indoor conference title and first national top–10 finish since 1984. In 2013, Oklahoma State scored an 8th–place finish at the NCAA Championship, their best result in 29 years. A year later in 2014, Oklahoma State would claim their first indoor conference championship, winning the Big 12 title over Texas, 112.5–108.5, along with a 6th–place finish at the NCAA Championship. The Cowboys would add another Big 12 title in 2016, again beating Texas by a score of 130–128.5.

The 2023 season marked the beginning of a three year stretch of Oklahoma State runners scoring individual national championships. In 2023, Fouad Messaoudi won the national title in the men's 3,000 meters, while the men's DMR team won their own national title in 2023 before successfully defending their championship and winning the title again in 2024. Brian Musau would keep the streak alive, winning the men's 5000 meters title in 2025 and helping the team secure a 5th–place finish, the program's first top–5 finish since 1965.

=== Outdoor history ===
The Oklahoma State men's outdoor track and field team was organized in 1900, first competing in the Oklahoma Intercollegiate and Southwest conferences before moving to the Missouri Valley. The Cowboys would win their first Missouri Valley conference championship in 1929, before adding two more in 1932 and 1934. Oklahoma State would then dominate the rest of the conference, winning the conference title 17 straight times from 1938–1957.

After moving to the Big Eight Conference, the Cowboys would score their first top–5 national finish in program history in 1959, earning a 5th–place finish at the NCAA Championship.

Since moving to the Big 12, the Cowboys most successful season was in 2025, when Oklahoma State scored an 11th–place finish at the NCAA Championships and Brian Musau won his second national title in the men's 5000 meters.

== NCAA Championship results ==
Indoor Championship Results

Year	Points	Place
1965	12	2nd
1966	5	15th
1967	3	26th
1969	4	20th
1970	2	32nd
1971	6	16th
1973	4	26th
1974	4	32nd
1982	10	14th
1983	2	41st
1984	15	7th
1985	11	12th
1986	10	13th
1989	2	42nd
1995	3	43rd
1996	12	18th
1997	5	39th
1999	1	56th
2001	1	55th
2003	2	54th
2004	6	29th
2010	1	60th
2012	1	61st
2013	20	8th
2014	20	6th
2015	14	13th
2016	9	24th
2017	6	30th
2018	6	36th
2019	5	41st
2022	4	41st
2023	25	6th
2024	23	7th
2025	26	5th
2026	2	47th

Outdoor Championship Results

Year	Points	Place
1929	1	38th
1931	9	19th
1932	2	35th
1938	2	26th
1939	10	14th
1940	2.33	31st
1941	3	28th
1942	8.2	17th
1946	6	24th
1955	10	17th
1956	19	9th
1957	2	38th
1958	0.43	42nd
1959	22.1	5th
1960	3	35th
1961	8	24th
1963	10	15th
1964	0.5	57th
1965	1	55th
1966	16	11th
1967	11	18th
1970	5	37th
1971	6	29th
1972	12	12th
1973	6	36th
1980	16	11th
1981	4	36th
1982	29	16th
1983	13.5	39th
1984	46	9th
1985	11	22nd
1986	8	34th
1994	5	48th
1995	1	70th
1996	3	58th
1997	7	40th
1998	3	56th
1999	4	51st
2000	3	53rd
2008	4	50th

Year	Points	Place
2009	10	25th
2010	8	32nd
2012	1	66th
2013	2	65th
2014	16	13th
2015	10	19th
2016	14	15th
2017	5	51st
2019	16	18th
2021	6	37th
2022	13	18th
2023	9	27th
2024	11	27th
2025	19	11th
2026	16	16th

== NCAA Individual Event Champions ==
=== Indoor ===
Year	Event	Athlete(s)
1965	880 yards	Tom von Ruden
1965	Two–mile relay	Jim Metcalf, John Perry, Tom von Ruden, Dave Perry
1966	Two–mile relay	Arnold Droke, Jim Metcalf, John Perry, Tom von Ruden
1984	High Jump	Joe Dial
1985	Pole Vault	Joe Dial
1986	Mile	Paul Larkins
2023	3,000 meters	Fouad Messaoudi
2023	DMR	Fouad Messaoudi, Charlie Bartholomew, Juan Diego Castro, Ryan Schoppe
2024	DMR	Brian Musau, DJ McArthur, Mehdi Yanouri, Ryan Schoppe
2025	5,000 meters	Brian Musau

=== Outdoor ===
Year	Event	Athlete(s)
1955	440 yards	J.W. Mashburn
1956	440 yards	J.W Mashburn
1956	400 meters	J.W. Mashburn
1956	Pole Vault	Jim Graham
1959	Pole Vault	Jim Graham
1961	Pole Vault	George Davies
1967	Steeplechase	Chris McCubbins
1972	10,000 meters	John Halberstadt
1982	200 meters	James Butler
1984	Pole Vault	Joe Dial
1985	Pole Vault	Joe Dial
2009	1,500 meters	German Fernandez
2015	1,500 meters	Chad Noelle
2016	Hammer Throw	Nick Miller
2025	5,000 meters	Brian Musau

== Olympic track and field medalists ==
The following Oklahoma State men's athletes have earned medals in one or more track and field events at the Summer Olympics:

- J.W. Mashburn, American gold medalist at the 1956 Melbourne Olympics

== OSU Track and Field Complex ==
Built in 2013 at a cost of about $9 million, the complex features a nine-lane 400-meter track with a steeplechase turnout along with infield and adjacent areas for field events, including shot put, discus, hammer throw, pole vault, high jump and long jump.

== See also ==
- Oklahoma State Cowboys and Cowgirls
- Oklahoma State Cowboys cross country
