= Utah State Aggies track and field =

American college track and field team

- University: University of Nevada, Las Vegas
- Head coach: Artie Gulden
- Conference: MW
- Location: Logan, Utah
- Outdoor track: Ralph Maughan Stadium
- Nickname: Aggies
- Colors: Navy blue, white, and pewter gray

The Utah State Aggies track and field team is the track and field program that represents University of Nevada, Las Vegas. The Aggies compete in NCAA Division I as a member of the Mountain West Conference. The team is based in Logan, Utah, at the Ralph Maughan Stadium.

The program is coached by Artie Gulden. The track and field program officially encompasses four teams because the NCAA considers men's and women's indoor track and field and outdoor track and field as separate sports.

In 1977, middle-distance runner Mark Enyeart became the first three-time NCAA champion for the program. His Utah State track uniform was retired in October 1977.

== Postseason ==
As of August 2025, a total of 28 men and 8 women have achieved individual first-team All-American status for the team at the Division I men's outdoor, women's outdoor, men's indoor, or women's indoor national championships (using the modern criteria of top-8 placing regardless of athlete nationality).

First team NCAA All-Americans
Team	Championships	Name	Event	Place	Ref.
Men's	1927 Outdoor	Melvin Burke	Mile run	4th	
Men's	1947 Outdoor	Ralph Maughan	Javelin throw	5th	
Men's	1949 Outdoor	Ralph Roylance	Javelin throw	3rd	
Men's	1951 Outdoor	Ross Morris	Shot put	7th	
Men's	1957 Outdoor	Jay Silvester	Shot put	4th	
Men's	1957 Outdoor	Jay Silvester	Discus throw	3rd	
Men's	1958 Outdoor	Harold Theus	High jump	8th	
Men's	1958 Outdoor	Jay Silvester	Shot put	2nd	
Men's	1958 Outdoor	Jay Silvester	Discus throw	3rd	
Men's	1960 Outdoor	Glen Passey	Discus throw	5th	
Men's	1961 Outdoor	Glen Passey	Discus throw	1st	
Men's	1965 Indoor	Gerald Cerullo	55 meters hurdles	3rd	
Men's	1965 Outdoor	Jerry Cerulla	110 meters hurdles	2nd	
Men's	1966 Indoor	Jerry Cerulla	55 meters hurdles	1st	
Men's	1966 Outdoor	Jim Helton	Long jump	2nd	
Men's	1967 Indoor	James Helton	Long jump	4th	
Men's	1967 Outdoor	Jim Helton	Long jump	2nd	
Men's	1968 Indoor	Mike Mercer	Shot put	2nd	
Men's	1968 Outdoor	Mike Mercer	Shot put	4th	
Men's	1968 Outdoor	Ain Roost	Discus throw	4th	
Men's	1970 Indoor	Brian Caulfield	Shot put	5th	
Men's	1970 Outdoor	Brian Caulfield	Shot put	6th	
Men's	1973 Indoor	Mark Enyeart	400 meters	3rd	
Men's	1974 Outdoor	Steve Blake	Discus throw	8th	
Men's	1975 Indoor	Mark Enyeart	800 meters	1st	
Men's	1975 Outdoor	Mark Enyeart	800 meters	1st	
Men's	1976 Indoor	Isaiah Ugboro	800 meters	3rd	
Men's	1977 Indoor	Mark Enyeart	800 meters	2nd	
Men's	1977 Outdoor	Mark Enyeart	800 meters	1st	
Men's	1990 Indoor	Craig Carter	Weight throw	4th	
Women's	1990 Indoor	Ime Akpan	55 meters hurdles	4th	
Men's	1990 Outdoor	Craig Carter	Hammer throw	7th	
Women's	1993 Indoor	Alisa Nicodemus	Mile run	3rd	
Women's	1993 Indoor	Alisa Nicodemus	5000 meters	4th	
Men's	1995 Outdoor	Lance White	Pole vault	4th	
Women's	1996 Outdoor	LaDonna Antoine	400 meters	6th	
Women's	1997 Indoor	LaDonna Antoine	400 meters	7th	
Women's	1997 Outdoor	LaDonna Antoine	400 meters	4th	
Women's	1998 Indoor	Shae Jones-Bair	Pole vault	8th	
Men's	1998 Outdoor	Cory Murdock	400 meters hurdles	4th	
Men's	1999 Indoor	Corey Murdock	400 meters	7th	
Women's	1999 Indoor	Shae Jones-Bair	Pole vault	5th	
Men's	1999 Outdoor	Corey Murdock	400 meters hurdles	2nd	
Men's	1999 Outdoor	James Parker	Hammer throw	5th	
Men's	2000 Indoor	James Parker	Weight throw	6th	
Men's	2000 Outdoor	James Parker	Hammer throw	4th	
Women's	2000 Outdoor	Shae Baer	Pole vault	4th	
Men's	2001 Indoor	James Parker	Weight throw	5th	
Men's	2001 Outdoor	Dave Hoffman	High jump	2nd	
Men's	2001 Outdoor	James Parker	Hammer throw	2nd	
Men's	2002 Outdoor	Brett Guymon	400 meters hurdles	4th	
Women's	2007 Indoor	Jennie Twitchell	Mile run	5th	
Men's	2009 Indoor	John Strang	Heptathlon	8th	
Men's	2017 Outdoor	Sindri Gudmundsson	Javelin throw	6th	
Men's	2018 Indoor	Dillon Maggard	3000 meters	5th	
Men's	2018 Indoor	Jordan Beutler	Distance medley relay	5th	
Men's	2018 Indoor	Brady Martin	Distance medley relay	5th	
Men's	2018 Indoor	Clay Lambourne	Distance medley relay	5th	
Men's	2018 Indoor	Dillon Maggard	Distance medley relay	5th	
Men's	2018 Outdoor	Dillon Maggard	5000 meters	6th	
Men's	2018 Outdoor	Dillon Maggard	10,000 meters	3rd	
Men's	2018 Outdoor	Sindri Gudmundsson	Javelin throw	3rd	
Women's	2018 Outdoor	Cierra Simmons-Mecham	3000 meters steeplechase	8th	
Men's	2019 Outdoor	Sindri Gudmundsson	Javelin throw	4th	
Men's	2025 Indoor	Logan Hammer	Pole vault	6th	
Women's	2025 Outdoor	Shelby Jensen	3000 meters steeplechase	7th	

== See also ==
- Category:Utah State Aggies men's track and field athletes (7)
- Category:Utah State Aggies women's track and field athletes (3)
