= Kansas Jayhawks track and field =

College track and field team

- University: University of Kansas
- Head coach: Stanley Redwine
- Conference: Big 12
- Location: Lawrence, Kansas
- Outdoor track: Rock Chalk Park
- Nickname: Jayhawks
- Colors: Crimson and blue

NCAA Indoor National Championships
- Men: 1966, 1969, 1970

NCAA Outdoor National Championships
- Men: 1959, 1960, 1970; Women: 2013

The Kansas Jayhawks track and field team is the track and field program that represents University of Kansas. The Jayhawks compete in NCAA Division I as a member of the Big 12 Conference. The team is based in Lawrence, Kansas, at the Rock Chalk Park.

The program is coached by Stanley Redwine. The track and field program officially encompasses four teams because the NCAA considers men's and women's indoor track and field and outdoor track and field as separate sports.

The Kansas men won their first national team title at the 1959 NCAA Division I Outdoor Track and Field Championships. Karl Salb won the most NCAA individual titles, with six in the shot put from 1969 to 1971.

The track and field program hosts the Kansas Relays annually since 1923. They also participate in the KU-KSU-WSU Triangular since 2015.

== Postseason ==
=== AIAW ===
The Jayhawks have had 11 AIAW individual All-Americans finishing in the top six at the AIAW indoor or outdoor championships.

AIAW All-Americans
Championships	Name	Event	Place
1972 Outdoor	Mary Jacobson	Shot put	2nd
1973 Outdoor	Mary Jacobson	Shot put	2nd
1973 Outdoor	Mary Jacobson	Discus throw	5th
1974 Outdoor	Mary Jacobson	Shot put	2nd
1977 Outdoor	Sheila Calmese	100 meters	3rd
1977 Outdoor	Sheila Calmese	200 meters	6th
1978 Indoor	Sheila Calmese	60 yards	2nd
1978 Indoor	Sheila Calmese	300 yards	1st
1978 Indoor	Charmaine Kuhlman	440 yards	5th
1978 Indoor	Cathy McMillin	1000 yards	5th
1978 Indoor	Lori Lowrey	60 yards hurdles	3rd
1978 Indoor	Shawn Corwin	High jump	2nd
1978 Indoor	Charmaine Kuhlman	Long jump	2nd
1978 Outdoor	Sheila Calmese	100 meters	3rd
1978 Outdoor	Sheila Calmese	200 meters	4th
1979 Indoor	Sheila Calmese	60 yards	1st
1979 Indoor	Lori Green	60 yards	2nd
1979 Indoor	Sheila Calmese	300 yards	3rd
1979 Indoor	Lori Green	300 yards	5th
1979 Indoor	Deb Hertzog	1000 yards	6th
1979 Indoor	Michelle Brown	Mile run	6th
1979 Indoor	Shawn Corwin	High jump	3rd
1979 Indoor	Deanna Patrick	Shot put	3rd
1979 Outdoor	Karen Fitz	10,000 meters	4th
1980 Indoor	Michelle Brown	2000 meters	4th

=== NCAA ===
As of August 2025, a total of 163 men and 43 women have achieved individual first-team All-American status at the Division I men's outdoor, women's outdoor, men's indoor, or women's indoor national championships (using the modern criteria of top-8 placing regardless of athlete nationality).

First team NCAA All-Americans
Team	Championships	Name	Event	Place	Ref.
Men's	1922 Outdoor	Carey Rogers	Pole vault	3rd	
Men's	1923 Outdoor	Tom Poor	High jump	1st	
Men's	1923 Outdoor	Carey Rogers	Pole vault	3rd	
Men's	1925 Outdoor	Howard Rooney	200 meters	6th	
Men's	1925 Outdoor	Tom Poor	High jump	4th	
Men's	1927 Outdoor	Lowell Grady	100 meters	6th	
Men's	1927 Outdoor	Charles Doornbos	110 meters hurdles	6th	
Men's	1927 Outdoor	Lowell Graddy	200 meters	2nd	
Men's	1927 Outdoor	Poco Frazier	3000 meters	3rd	
Men's	1928 Outdoor	Poco Frazier	3000 meters	3rd	
Men's	1928 Outdoor	Cyrus Sprangler	Long jump	6th	
Men's	1929 Outdoor	Jay Wilcox	100 meters	6th	
Men's	1930 Outdoor	Jim Bausch	Shot put	6th	
Men's	1930 Outdoor	Melvin Thornhill	Discus throw	6th	
Men's	1931 Outdoor	Clyde Coffman	Pole vault	4th	
Men's	1932 Outdoor	Glenn Cunningham	Mile run	1st	
Men's	1932 Outdoor	Melvin Thornhill	Discus throw	4th	
Men's	1933 Outdoor	Glenn Cunningham	800 meters	2nd	
Men's	1933 Outdoor	Glenn Cunningham	Mile run	1st	
Men's	1933 Outdoor	Elwyn Dees	Shot put	4th	
Men's	1934 Outdoor	Ed Hall	200 meters	6th	
Men's	1934 Outdoor	Glenn Cunningham	Mile run	2nd	
Men's	1935 Outdoor	Elwyn Dees	Shot put	1st	
Men's	1939 Outdoor	Don Bird	Pole vault	5th	
Men's	1940 Outdoor	Ray Harris	3000 meters	5th	
Men's	1946 Outdoor	Tom Schofield	High jump	2nd	
Men's	1946 Outdoor	Karl Ebel	Javelin throw	6th	
Men's	1946 Outdoor	Leroy Robinson	Javelin throw	7th	
Men's	1947 Outdoor	Tom Scofield	High jump	2nd	
Men's	1948 Outdoor	Bob Karnes	5000 meters	6th	
Men's	1948 Outdoor	Tom Schofield	High jump	3rd	
Men's	1949 Outdoor	Pat Bowers	800 meters	4th	
Men's	1949 Outdoor	Bob Karnes	3000 meters	8th	
Men's	1950 Outdoor	Bob Karnes	Mile run	4th	
Men's	1950 Outdoor	Herb Semper	3000 meters	3rd	
Men's	1951 Outdoor	Herb Semper	3000 meters	3rd	
Men's	1951 Outdoor	Jack Greenwood	220 yards hurdles	5th	
Men's	1952 Outdoor	Bob Devinney	400 meters hurdles	1st	
Men's	1952 Outdoor	Wes Santee	5000 meters	1st	
Men's	1953 Outdoor	Don Smith	400 meters	2nd	
Men's	1953 Outdoor	Wes Santee	Mile run	1st	
Men's	1954 Outdoor	Bill Biberstein	110 meters hurdles	5th	
Men's	1954 Outdoor	Art Dalzell	Mile run	5th	
Men's	1955 Outdoor	Bill Biberstein	110 meters hurdles	7th	
Men's	1955 Outdoor	Dick Blair	200 meters	4th	
Men's	1955 Outdoor	Allen Frame	3000 meters	3rd	
Men's	1955 Outdoor	Bob Smith	Long jump	7th	
Men's	1955 Outdoor	Blaine Hollinger	Long jump	8th	
Men's	1955 Outdoor	Bill Nieder	Shot put	1st	
Men's	1955 Outdoor	Les Bitner	Javelin throw	1st	
Men's	1956 Outdoor	Dick Blair	100 meters	6th	
Men's	1956 Outdoor	Dick Blair	200 meters	2nd	
Men's	1956 Outdoor	Lowell Janzen	800 meters	6th	
Men's	1956 Outdoor	Allen Frame	10,000 meters	4th	
Men's	1956 Outdoor	Jerry McNeal	10,000 meters	5th	
Men's	1956 Outdoor	Kent Floerke	Long jump	3rd	
Men's	1956 Outdoor	Blaine Hollinger	Long jump	4th	
Men's	1956 Outdoor	Kent Floerke	Triple jump	2nd	
Men's	1956 Outdoor	Bill Nieder	Shot put	2nd	
Men's	1956 Outdoor	Al Oerter	Discus throw	4th	
Men's	1956 Outdoor	Les Bitner	Javelin throw	3rd	
Men's	1957 Outdoor	Lowell Janzen	800 meters	4th	
Men's	1957 Outdoor	Jerry McNeal	3000 meters	3rd	
Men's	1957 Outdoor	Dave Tams	Pole vault	4th	
Men's	1957 Outdoor	Al Oerter	Discus throw	1st	
Men's	1958 Outdoor	Charlie Tidwell	100 meters	3rd	
Men's	1958 Outdoor	Bob Tague	800 meters	7th	
Men's	1958 Outdoor	Bob Cannon	High jump	4th	
Men's	1958 Outdoor	Ernie Shelby	Long jump	1st	
Men's	1958 Outdoor	Kent Floerke	Long jump	4th	
Men's	1958 Outdoor	Al Oerter	Shot put	8th	
Men's	1958 Outdoor	Al Oerter	Discus throw	1st	
Men's	1958 Outdoor	Charlie Tidwell	220 yards hurdles	1st	
Men's	1959 Outdoor	Charlie Tidwell	100 meters	1st	
Men's	1959 Outdoor	Bill Tillman	110 meters hurdles	3rd	
Men's	1959 Outdoor	Paul Williams	200 meters	4th	
Men's	1959 Outdoor	Cliff Cushman	400 meters hurdles	2nd	
Men's	1959 Outdoor	Tom Rodda	Mile run	5th	
Men's	1959 Outdoor	Berry Crawford	3000 meters steeplechase	5th	
Men's	1959 Outdoor	Ernie Shelby	Long jump	1st	
Men's	1959 Outdoor	Paul Williams	Long jump	8th	
Men's	1959 Outdoor	Ernie Shelby	Triple jump	5th	
Men's	1959 Outdoor	Cliff Cushman	Triple jump	6th	
Men's	1959 Outdoor	William Alley	Javelin throw	1st	
Men's	1959 Outdoor	Jim Londerholm	Javelin throw	3rd	
Men's	1959 Outdoor	Charlie Tidwell	220 yards hurdles	2nd	
Men's	1959 Outdoor	Ernie Shelby	220 yards hurdles	3rd	
Men's	1960 Outdoor	Charlie Tidwell	100 meters	1st	
Men's	1960 Outdoor	Charlie Tidwell	200 meters	1st	
Men's	1960 Outdoor	Cliff Cushman	400 meters hurdles	1st	
Men's	1960 Outdoor	Bill Dotson	1500 meters	5th	
Men's	1960 Outdoor	Billy Mills	5000 meters	5th	
Men's	1960 Outdoor	William Alley	Javelin throw	1st	
Men's	1960 Outdoor	Terry Beucher	Javelin throw	3rd	
Men's	1961 Outdoor	Kirk Hagan	800 meters	4th	
Men's	1961 Outdoor	Bill Dotson	Mile run	2nd	
Men's	1962 Outdoor	Bill Dotson	Mile run	3rd	
Men's	1963 Outdoor	Paul Acevedo	5000 meters	6th	
Men's	1964 Outdoor	Bill Silverberg	3000 meters steeplechase	3rd	
Men's	1964 Outdoor	Gary Schwartz	Discus throw	7th	
Men's	1965 Indoor	Herald Hadley	3000 meters	1st	
Men's	1965 Indoor	Ron Suggs	4 × 400 meters relay	5th	
Men's	1965 Indoor	Bob Hanson	4 × 400 meters relay	5th	
Men's	1965 Indoor	Lowell Paul	4 × 400 meters relay	5th	
Men's	1965 Indoor	Doug Dienelt	4 × 400 meters relay	5th	
Men's	1965 Outdoor	Lowell Paul	800 meters	7th	
Men's	1965 Outdoor	John Lawson	5000 meters	2nd	
Men's	1965 Outdoor	Tom Puma	Javelin throw	3rd	
Men's	1965 Outdoor	Bill Floerke	Javelin throw	8th	
Men's	1966 Indoor	Lowell Paul	1000 meters	3rd	
Men's	1966 Indoor	John Lawson	3000 meters	2nd	
Men's	1966 Indoor	Art Cortez	Long jump	2nd	
Men's	1966 Indoor	Gary Ard	Long jump	3rd	
Men's	1966 Outdoor	John Lawson	5000 meters	2nd	
Men's	1966 Outdoor	John Lawson	10,000 meters	3rd	
Men's	1966 Outdoor	Gary Ard	Long jump	6th	
Men's	1967 Indoor	Ben Olison	400 meters	5th	
Men's	1967 Indoor	Jim Ryun	800 meters	2nd	
Men's	1967 Indoor	Tom Yergovich	1000 meters	4th	
Men's	1967 Indoor	Jim Ryun	Mile run	1st	
Men's	1967 Indoor	Gary Ard	Long jump	2nd	
Men's	1967 Outdoor	George Byers	110 meters hurdles	8th	
Men's	1967 Outdoor	Ben Olison	400 meters	8th	
Men's	1967 Outdoor	Jim Ryun	Mile run	1st	
Men's	1967 Outdoor	Gary Ard	Long jump	1st	
Men's	1968 Indoor	Julio Meade	400 meters	5th	
Men's	1968 Indoor	Jim Ryun	Mile run	1st	
Men's	1968 Indoor	Jim Ryun	3000 meters	1st	
Men's	1968 Indoor	Bob Steinhoff	Pole vault	5th	
Men's	1968 Indoor	Stan Whitley	Triple jump	4th	
Men's	1968 Outdoor	Stan Whitley	Long jump	5th	
Men's	1968 Outdoor	Doug Knop	Discus throw	7th	
Men's	1969 Indoor	George Byers	55 meters hurdles	3rd	
Men's	1969 Indoor	Jim Ryun	Mile run	1st	
Men's	1969 Indoor	Bob Bornkessel	Distance medley relay	5th	
Men's	1969 Indoor	Jim Hatcher	Distance medley relay	5th	
Men's	1969 Indoor	Randy Julian	Distance medley relay	5th	
Men's	1969 Indoor	Julio Meade	Distance medley relay	5th	
Men's	1969 Indoor	Bob Steinhoff	Pole vault	3rd	
Men's	1969 Indoor	Ron Jessie	Long jump	1st	
Men's	1969 Indoor	Stan Whitley	Long jump	2nd	
Men's	1969 Indoor	Ken Gaines	Triple jump	4th	
Men's	1969 Indoor	Karl Salb	Shot put	1st	
Men's	1969 Indoor	Steve Wilhelm	Shot put	2nd	
Men's	1969 Indoor	Doug Knop	Shot put	3rd	
Men's	1969 Outdoor	George Byers	110 meters hurdles	4th	
Men's	1969 Outdoor	Bob Bornkessel	400 meters hurdles	7th	
Men's	1969 Outdoor	Jim Ryun	Mile run	2nd	
Men's	1969 Outdoor	George Byers	4 × 100 meters relay	4th	
Men's	1969 Outdoor	Mickey Matthews	4 × 100 meters relay	4th	
Men's	1969 Outdoor	Stan Whitley	4 × 100 meters relay	4th	
Men's	1969 Outdoor	Julio Meade	4 × 100 meters relay	4th	
Men's	1969 Outdoor	Stan Whitley	Long jump	2nd	
Men's	1969 Outdoor	Karl Salb	Shot put	1st	
Men's	1969 Outdoor	Steve Wilhelm	Shot put	2nd	
Men's	1969 Outdoor	Doug Knop	Discus throw	5th	
Men's	1969 Outdoor	Karl Salb	Discus throw	6th	
Men's	1970 Indoor	Doug Smith	Mile run	5th	
Men's	1970 Indoor	Dennis Stewart	4 × 800 meters relay	1st	
Men's	1970 Indoor	Jim Neihouse	4 × 800 meters relay	1st	
Men's	1970 Indoor	Roger Kathol	4 × 800 meters relay	1st	
Men's	1970 Indoor	Brian McElroy	4 × 800 meters relay	1st	
Men's	1970 Indoor	Jan Johnson	Pole vault	2nd	
Men's	1970 Indoor	Bill Hatcher	Pole vault	4th	
Men's	1970 Indoor	Karl Salb	Shot put	1st	
Men's	1970 Indoor	Steve Wilhelm	Shot put	2nd	
Men's	1970 Indoor	Doug Knop	Shot put	3rd	
Men's	1970 Indoor	Bill Penny	Weight throw	4th	
Men's	1970 Outdoor	Brian McElroy	800 meters	7th	
Men's	1970 Outdoor	Jay Mason	5000 meters	7th	
Men's	1970 Outdoor	Jan Johnson	Pole vault	1st	
Men's	1970 Outdoor	Karl Salb	Shot put	1st	
Men's	1970 Outdoor	Steve Wilhelm	Shot put	4th	
Men's	1970 Outdoor	Karl Salb	Discus throw	3rd	
Men's	1970 Outdoor	Doug Knop	Discus throw	4th	
Men's	1970 Outdoor	Bill Penny	Hammer throw	6th	
Men's	1971 Indoor	Doug Smith	4 × 800 meters relay	3rd	
Men's	1971 Indoor	Jim Neihouse	4 × 800 meters relay	3rd	
Men's	1971 Indoor	Rick Jacques	4 × 800 meters relay	3rd	
Men's	1971 Indoor	Kevin Reabe	4 × 800 meters relay	3rd	
Men's	1971 Indoor	Karl Salb	Shot put	1st	
Men's	1971 Indoor	Steve Wilhelm	Shot put	3rd	
Men's	1971 Outdoor	Tom Scavuzzo	4 × 100 meters relay	5th	
Men's	1971 Outdoor	Frank Johnson	4 × 100 meters relay	5th	
Men's	1971 Outdoor	Mike Bates	4 × 100 meters relay	5th	
Men's	1971 Outdoor	Phil Reaves	4 × 100 meters relay	5th	
Men's	1971 Outdoor	Karl Salb	Shot put	1st	
Men's	1971 Outdoor	Steve Wilhelm	Shot put	6th	
Men's	1971 Outdoor	Karl Salb	Discus throw	4th	
Men's	1971 Outdoor	Bill Penny	Hammer throw	3rd	
Men's	1971 Outdoor	Sam Colson	Javelin throw	4th	
Men's	1972 Outdoor	Mark Lutz	200 meters	2nd	
Men's	1972 Outdoor	Tom Scavuzzo	4 × 100 meters relay	4th	
Men's	1972 Outdoor	Bob Bornkessel	4 × 100 meters relay	4th	
Men's	1972 Outdoor	Mark Lutz	4 × 100 meters relay	4th	
Men's	1972 Outdoor	Delario Robinson	4 × 100 meters relay	4th	
Men's	1972 Outdoor	Barry Schur	High jump	2nd	
Men's	1972 Outdoor	Sam Colson	Javelin throw	3rd	
Men's	1973 Indoor	Barry Schur	High jump	2nd	
Men's	1973 Indoor	Terry Porter	Pole vault	1st	
Men's	1973 Indoor	Rudy Guevarra	Shot put	4th	
Men's	1973 Outdoor	Delario Robinson	110 meters hurdles	8th	
Men's	1973 Outdoor	Randy Smith	High jump	6th	
Men's	1973 Outdoor	Terry Porter	Pole vault	3rd	
Men's	1973 Outdoor	Sam Colson	Javelin throw	1st	
Men's	1974 Indoor	Terry Porter	Pole vault	4th	
Men's	1974 Indoor	Danny Seay	Long jump	3rd	
Men's	1974 Outdoor	Kent McDonald	3000 meters steeplechase	6th	
Men's	1974 Outdoor	Tom Scavuzzo	4 × 100 meters relay	1st	
Men's	1974 Outdoor	Eddie Lewis	4 × 100 meters relay	1st	
Men's	1974 Outdoor	Mark Lutz	4 × 100 meters relay	1st	
Men's	1974 Outdoor	Emmett Edwards	4 × 100 meters relay	1st	
Men's	1974 Outdoor	Randy Smith	High jump	1st	
Men's	1974 Outdoor	Terry Porter	Pole vault	6th	
Men's	1974 Outdoor	Theo Hamilton	Long jump	7th	
Men's	1974 Outdoor	Danny Seay	Long jump	8th	
Men's	1975 Indoor	Waddell Smith	600 yards	2nd	
Men's	1975 Indoor	Noland Cromwell	600 yards	4th	
Men's	1975 Indoor	Ted Scales	Pole vault	5th	
Men's	1975 Indoor	Theo Hamilton	Long jump	1st	
Men's	1975 Indoor	Danny Seay	Long jump	2nd	
Men's	1975 Indoor	Danny Seay	Triple jump	5th	
Men's	1975 Outdoor	Cliff Wiley	100 meters	5th	
Men's	1975 Outdoor	Nolan Cromwell	400 meters hurdles	8th	
Men's	1975 Outdoor	Kent McDonald	3000 meters steeplechase	6th	
Men's	1975 Outdoor	Larry Jackson	4 × 400 meters relay	2nd	
Men's	1975 Outdoor	Waddell Smith	4 × 400 meters relay	2nd	
Men's	1975 Outdoor	Randy Benson	4 × 400 meters relay	2nd	
Men's	1975 Outdoor	Cliff Wiley	4 × 400 meters relay	2nd	
Men's	1975 Outdoor	Randy Smith	High jump	3rd	
Men's	1975 Outdoor	Danny Seay	Long jump	2nd	
Men's	1975 Outdoor	Danny Seay	Triple jump	5th	
Men's	1976 Indoor	Cliff Wiley	4 × 400 meters relay	2nd	
Men's	1976 Indoor	Jay Wagner	4 × 400 meters relay	2nd	
Men's	1976 Indoor	Randy Benson	4 × 400 meters relay	2nd	
Men's	1976 Indoor	Waddell Smith	4 × 400 meters relay	2nd	
Men's	1976 Outdoor	Larry Jackson	100 meters	4th	
Men's	1976 Outdoor	Laverne Smith	100 meters	7th	
Men's	1976 Outdoor	Larry Jackson	200 meters	6th	
Men's	1976 Outdoor	Cliff Wiley	200 meters	8th	
Men's	1976 Outdoor	Bill Lundberg	3000 meters steeplechase	6th	
Men's	1976 Outdoor	Laverne Smith	4 × 100 meters relay	2nd	
Men's	1976 Outdoor	Anthony Coleman	4 × 100 meters relay	2nd	
Men's	1976 Outdoor	Cliff Wiley	4 × 100 meters relay	2nd	
Men's	1976 Outdoor	Larry Jackson	4 × 100 meters relay	2nd	
Men's	1976 Outdoor	Jim Podrebarac	Shot put	8th	
Men's	1976 Outdoor	Roger Hammond	Javelin throw	3rd	
Men's	1977 Indoor	Cliff Wiley	55 meters	3rd	
Men's	1977 Indoor	Jay Wagner	600 yards	4th	
Men's	1977 Indoor	Cliff Wiley	4 × 400 meters relay	1st	
Men's	1977 Indoor	Jay Wagner	4 × 400 meters relay	1st	
Men's	1977 Indoor	Kevin Newell	4 × 400 meters relay	1st	
Men's	1977 Indoor	David Blutcher	4 × 400 meters relay	1st	
Men's	1977 Indoor	Ted Scales	Pole vault	4th	
Men's	1977 Outdoor	Cliff Wiley	100 meters	6th	
Men's	1977 Outdoor	Cliff Wiley	200 meters	3rd	
Men's	1977 Outdoor	George Mason	3000 meters steeplechase	6th	
Men's	1977 Outdoor	Cliff Wiley	4 × 100 meters relay	3rd	
Men's	1977 Outdoor	Anthony Coleman	4 × 100 meters relay	3rd	
Men's	1977 Outdoor	Kevin Newell	4 × 100 meters relay	3rd	
Men's	1977 Outdoor	David Blutcher	4 × 100 meters relay	3rd	
Men's	1978 Indoor	Lester Mickens	600 yards	5th	
Men's	1978 Outdoor	Cliff Wiley	200 meters	5th	
Men's	1978 Outdoor	Bob Lozito	4 × 100 meters relay	3rd	
Men's	1978 Outdoor	Anthony Coleman	4 × 100 meters relay	3rd	
Men's	1978 Outdoor	Cliff Wiley	4 × 100 meters relay	3rd	
Men's	1978 Outdoor	Kevin Newell	4 × 100 meters relay	3rd	
Men's	1978 Outdoor	Cliff Wiley	4 × 400 meters relay	2nd	
Men's	1978 Outdoor	Lester Mickens	4 × 400 meters relay	2nd	
Men's	1978 Outdoor	Tommy McCall	4 × 400 meters relay	2nd	
Men's	1978 Outdoor	Stan Whitaker	4 × 400 meters relay	2nd	
Men's	1979 Indoor	Lester Mickens	600 yards	2nd	
Men's	1979 Indoor	Jimmy Little	4 × 400 meters relay	2nd	
Men's	1979 Indoor	Stan Whitaker	4 × 400 meters relay	2nd	
Men's	1979 Indoor	Tommy McCall	4 × 400 meters relay	2nd	
Men's	1979 Indoor	Lester Mickens	4 × 400 meters relay	2nd	
Men's	1979 Indoor	Jeff Buckingham	Pole vault	2nd	
Men's	1979 Outdoor	Kevin Newell	4 × 400 meters relay	5th	
Men's	1979 Outdoor	Stan Whitaker	4 × 400 meters relay	5th	
Men's	1979 Outdoor	Tommy McCall	4 × 400 meters relay	5th	
Men's	1979 Outdoor	Lester Mickens	4 × 400 meters relay	5th	
Men's	1980 Indoor	Dean Hogan	400 meters	4th	
Men's	1980 Indoor	Mike Ricks	600 yards	1st	
Men's	1980 Indoor	Tim Jantsch	4 × 800 meters relay	6th	
Men's	1980 Indoor	Leonard Martin	4 × 800 meters relay	6th	
Men's	1980 Indoor	Ray Marks	4 × 800 meters relay	6th	
Men's	1980 Indoor	Rick Ensz	4 × 800 meters relay	6th	
Men's	1980 Indoor	Warren Wilhoite	Long jump	4th	
Men's	1980 Indoor	Sanya Owalabi	Triple jump	1st	
Men's	1980 Outdoor	Deon Hogan	400 meters	4th	
Men's	1980 Outdoor	Mike Ricks	400 meters	7th	
Men's	1980 Outdoor	Stan Whitaker	4 × 400 meters relay	2nd	
Men's	1980 Outdoor	Mike Ricks	4 × 400 meters relay	2nd	
Men's	1980 Outdoor	Lester Mickens	4 × 400 meters relay	2nd	
Men's	1980 Outdoor	Deon Hogan	4 × 400 meters relay	2nd	
Men's	1980 Outdoor	Sanya Owolabi	Triple jump	2nd	
Men's	1981 Indoor	Sanya Owalabi	Triple jump	2nd	
Men's	1982 Indoor	Jeff Buckingham	Pole vault	5th	
Men's	1982 Indoor	Warren Wilhoite	Long jump	2nd	
Men's	1982 Outdoor	Matt Friedeman	Discus throw	7th	
Women's	1982 Outdoor	Tudie McKnight	Long jump	4th	
Men's	1983 Indoor	Rod Bullock	4 × 400 meters relay	5th	
Men's	1983 Indoor	Darin Hill	4 × 400 meters relay	5th	
Men's	1983 Indoor	Leonard Martin	4 × 400 meters relay	5th	
Men's	1983 Indoor	Deon Hogan	4 × 400 meters relay	5th	
Men's	1983 Indoor	Jeff Buckingham	Pole vault	4th	
Men's	1983 Indoor	Warren Wilhoite	Long jump	4th	
Women's	1983 Indoor	Hakcyon McKnight	Long jump	5th	
Men's	1983 Outdoor	Jeff Buckingham	Pole vault	4th	
Men's	1983 Outdoor	Owen Buckley	Decathlon	6th	
Women's	1983 Outdoor	Tudie McKnight	Long jump	2nd	
Women's	1984 Outdoor	Stine Lerdahl	Shot put	6th	
Women's	1984 Outdoor	Anne-Grethe Baeraas	Javelin throw	2nd	
Women's	1985 Indoor	Ann O'Connor	High jump	3rd	
Women's	1985 Indoor	Stine Lerdahl	Shot put	6th	
Men's	1986 Indoor	Chris Bohanan	Pole vault	3rd	
Men's	1986 Indoor	Scott Huffman	Pole vault	4th	
Men's	1986 Outdoor	Ron Bahm	Javelin throw	7th	
Men's	1987 Indoor	Chris Bohanan	Pole vault	7th	
Men's	1987 Indoor	Dan Burton	Pole vault	8th	
Women's	1987 Indoor	Ann O'Connor	High jump	8th	
Women's	1987 Indoor	Denise Buchanan	Shot put	5th	
Men's	1987 Outdoor	Pat Manson	Pole vault	3rd	
Women's	1987 Outdoor	Karen Buchanan	Shot put	6th	
Men's	1988 Indoor	Scott Huffman	Pole vault	2nd	
Men's	1988 Indoor	Pat Manson	Pole vault	5th	
Men's	1988 Outdoor	Scott Huffman	Pole vault	7th	
Men's	1988 Outdoor	Vince Labosky	Javelin throw	7th	
Men's	1988 Outdoor	Craig Branstrom	Decathlon	6th	
Women's	1988 Outdoor	Ann O'Connor	Heptathlon	7th	
Men's	1989 Indoor	Craig Watcke	5000 meters	2nd	
Men's	1989 Indoor	Pat Manson	Pole vault	2nd	
Men's	1989 Indoor	Cam Miller	Pole vault	3rd	
Men's	1989 Outdoor	Craig Watcke	10,000 meters	4th	
Men's	1989 Outdoor	Pat Manson	Pole vault	2nd	
Men's	1989 Outdoor	Cam Miller	Pole vault	3rd	
Men's	1990 Indoor	Pat Manson	Pole vault	2nd	
Men's	1990 Outdoor	Vince Labosky	Javelin throw	2nd	
Men's	1991 Indoor	Donnie Anderson	4 × 800 meters relay	5th	
Men's	1991 Indoor	Stacey Smiedala	4 × 800 meters relay	5th	
Men's	1991 Indoor	Dan Waters	4 × 800 meters relay	5th	
Men's	1991 Indoor	Jason Teal	4 × 800 meters relay	5th	
Men's	1991 Indoor	Pat Manson	Pole vault	2nd	
Men's	1991 Outdoor	Pat Manson	Pole vault	3rd	
Women's	1992 Outdoor	Mary Beth Labosky	High jump	6th	
Women's	1992 Outdoor	Heather Berlin	Javelin throw	4th	
Men's	1994 Indoor	John Bazzoni	Pole vault	5th	
Women's	1994 Indoor	Kristi Kloster	800 meters	8th	
Men's	1995 Indoor	Nick Johannsen	High jump	8th	
Men's	1995 Indoor	John Bazzoni	Pole vault	4th	
Men's	1995 Outdoor	Michael Cox	1500 meters	4th	
Women's	1996 Indoor	Kristi Kloster	800 meters	1st	
Women's	1996 Indoor	Melissa Swartz	Mile run	5th	
Women's	1996 Indoor	Kerri Woolheater	Distance medley relay	7th	
Women's	1996 Indoor	Lataynya Holloway	Distance medley relay	7th	
Women's	1996 Indoor	Kristi Kloster	Distance medley relay	7th	
Women's	1996 Indoor	Melissa Swartz	Distance medley relay	7th	
Men's	1996 Outdoor	Michael Evers	Decathlon	6th	
Men's	1998 Indoor	Scott Russell	Weight throw	2nd	
Women's	1998 Indoor	Candy Mason	Pole vault	2nd	
Women's	1998 Indoor	Andrea Branson	Pole vault	5th	
Men's	1998 Outdoor	Lester Smith	Triple jump	8th	
Women's	1998 Outdoor	Candy Mason	Heptathlon	3rd	
Men's	1999 Indoor	Scott Russell	Weight throw	5th	
Women's	1999 Indoor	Andrea Branson	Pole vault	3rd	
Men's	1999 Outdoor	Scott Russell	Javelin throw	3rd	
Women's	1999 Outdoor	Candy Mason	Pole vault	3rd	
Women's	1999 Outdoor	Andrea Branson	Pole vault	4th	
Men's	2000 Indoor	Charlie Gruber	Mile run	6th	
Women's	2000 Indoor	Andrea Branson	Pole vault	5th	
Men's	2001 Indoor	Charlie Gruber	Mile run	2nd	
Men's	2001 Indoor	Andy Tate	Distance medley relay	6th	
Men's	2001 Indoor	Jabari Wamble	Distance medley relay	6th	
Men's	2001 Indoor	Brian Blachly	Distance medley relay	6th	
Men's	2001 Indoor	Charlie Gruber	Distance medley relay	6th	
Men's	2001 Indoor	Ryan Speers	Shot put	6th	
Men's	2001 Indoor	Scott Russell	Weight throw	3rd	
Men's	2001 Outdoor	Andy Tate	3000 meters steeplechase	4th	
Women's	2001 Outdoor	Andrea Bulat	Javelin throw	2nd	
Men's	2002 Indoor	Leo Bookman	200 meters	7th	
Men's	2002 Indoor	Vadim Gvozdestskiy	Pole vault	5th	
Men's	2002 Indoor	Scott Russell	Weight throw	1st	
Men's	2002 Outdoor	Charlie Gruber	1500 meters	7th	
Men's	2002 Outdoor	Scott Russell	Javelin throw	1st	
Men's	2003 Indoor	Leo Bookman	200 meters	1st	
Men's	2003 Outdoor	Leo Bookman	200 meters	1st	
Men's	2004 Indoor	Leo Bookman	200 meters	1st	
Men's	2005 Indoor	Jeremy Mims	800 meters	7th	
Men's	2005 Indoor	Sheldon Battle	Shot put	7th	
Women's	2005 Indoor	Amy Linnen	Pole vault	1st	
Men's	2005 Outdoor	Jeremy Mims	800 meters	4th	
Men's	2005 Outdoor	Sheldon Battle	Shot put	2nd	
Women's	2005 Outdoor	Amy Linnen	Pole vault	3rd	
Women's	2005 Outdoor	Kate Sultanova	Pole vault	7th	
Women's	2005 Outdoor	Brooklyn Hann	Triple jump	8th	
Men's	2006 Indoor	Sheldon Battle	Shot put	4th	
Men's	2006 Indoor	Egor Agafonov	Weight throw	2nd	
Women's	2006 Indoor	Charisse Bacchus	Long jump	5th	
Men's	2006 Outdoor	Sheldon Battle	Shot put	5th	
Men's	2006 Outdoor	Egor Agafonov	Hammer throw	5th	
Women's	2006 Outdoor	Charisse Bacchus	Long jump	7th	
Men's	2007 Indoor	Colby Wissel	3000 meters	7th	
Men's	2007 Indoor	Egor Agafonov	Weight throw	1st	
Women's	2007 Indoor	Kate Sultanova	Pole vault	3rd	
Men's	2007 Outdoor	Julius Jiles	110 meters hurdles	8th	
Men's	2007 Outdoor	Eric Babb	Long jump	4th	
Men's	2007 Outdoor	Barrett Saunders	Long jump	5th	
Men's	2007 Outdoor	Egor Agafonov	Hammer throw	4th	
Women's	2007 Outdoor	Kate Sultanova	Pole vault	5th	
Women's	2007 Outdoor	Abby Emsick	Discus throw	4th	
Men's	2008 Indoor	Egor Agafonov	Weight throw	1st	
Women's	2008 Indoor	Nickeisha Anderson	60 meters	6th	
Women's	2008 Indoor	Nickeisha Anderson	200 meters	2nd	
Women's	2008 Indoor	Kate Sultanova	Pole vault	3rd	
Women's	2008 Indoor	Stephanie Horton	Shot put	8th	
Men's	2008 Outdoor	Egor Agafonov	Hammer throw	3rd	
Women's	2008 Outdoor	Nickeisha Anderson	100 meters	4th	
Women's	2008 Outdoor	Nickeisha Anderson	200 meters	3rd	
Women's	2008 Outdoor	Crystal Manning	Triple jump	7th	
Women's	2008 Outdoor	Stephanie Horton	Shot put	8th	
Men's	2009 Indoor	Jordan Scott	Pole vault	3rd	
Men's	2010 Indoor	Mason Finley	Shot put	5th	
Men's	2010 Outdoor	Jordan Scott	Pole vault	1st	
Men's	2010 Outdoor	Mason Finley	Shot put	2nd	
Men's	2010 Outdoor	Mason Finley	Discus throw	2nd	
Women's	2010 Outdoor	Lauren Bonds	1500 meters	7th	
Women's	2010 Outdoor	Andrea Geubelle	Long jump	8th	
Men's	2011 Indoor	Mason Finley	Shot put	2nd	
Women's	2011 Indoor	Diamond Dixon	400 meters	6th	
Women's	2011 Indoor	Denesha Morris	4 × 400 meters relay	7th	
Women's	2011 Indoor	Kendra Bradley	4 × 400 meters relay	7th	
Women's	2011 Indoor	Taylor Washington	4 × 400 meters relay	7th	
Women's	2011 Indoor	Diamond Dixon	4 × 400 meters relay	7th	
Women's	2011 Indoor	Andrea Geubelle	Triple jump	8th	
Men's	2011 Outdoor	Mason Finley	Shot put	5th	
Men's	2011 Outdoor	Mason Finley	Discus throw	3rd	
Men's	2011 Outdoor	Johannes Swanepoel	Javelin throw	5th	
Women's	2011 Outdoor	Diamond Dixon	400 meters	3rd	
Women's	2011 Outdoor	Rebeka Stowe	3000 meters steeplechase	7th	
Women's	2011 Outdoor	Kendra Bradley	4 × 400 meters relay	8th	
Women's	2011 Outdoor	Denesha Morris	4 × 400 meters relay	8th	
Women's	2011 Outdoor	Diamond Dixon	4 × 400 meters relay	8th	
Women's	2011 Outdoor	Shayla Wilson	4 × 400 meters relay	8th	
Women's	2011 Outdoor	Andrea Geubelle	Triple jump	8th	
Women's	2011 Outdoor	Jessica Maroszek	Discus throw	8th	
Women's	2011 Outdoor	Heather Bergmann	Javelin throw	7th	
Women's	2012 Indoor	Diamond Dixon	400 meters	1st	
Women's	2012 Indoor	Denesha Morris	4 × 400 meters relay	3rd	
Women's	2012 Indoor	Paris Daniels	4 × 400 meters relay	3rd	
Women's	2012 Indoor	Taylor Washington	4 × 400 meters relay	3rd	
Women's	2012 Indoor	Diamond Dixon	4 × 400 meters relay	3rd	
Women's	2012 Indoor	Francine Simpson	Long jump	6th	
Women's	2012 Indoor	Andrea Geubelle	Long jump	8th	
Women's	2012 Indoor	Andrea Geubelle	Triple jump	1st	
Men's	2012 Outdoor	Michael Stigler	400 meters hurdles	6th	
Men's	2012 Outdoor	Mason Finley	Shot put	4th	
Men's	2012 Outdoor	Mason Finley	Discus throw	2nd	
Women's	2012 Outdoor	Paris Daniels	200 meters	8th	
Women's	2012 Outdoor	Diamond Dixon	400 meters	3rd	
Women's	2012 Outdoor	Rebeka Stowe	3000 meters steeplechase	8th	
Women's	2012 Outdoor	Francine Simpson	Long jump	4th	
Women's	2012 Outdoor	Andrea Geubelle	Long jump	6th	
Women's	2012 Outdoor	Andrea Geubelle	Triple jump	3rd	
Women's	2012 Outdoor	Alena Krechyk	Hammer throw	6th	
Women's	2012 Outdoor	Heather Bergmann	Javelin throw	6th	
Women's	2013 Indoor	Paris Daniels	200 meters	8th	
Women's	2013 Indoor	Diamond Dixon	400 meters	6th	
Women's	2013 Indoor	Denesha Morris	4 × 400 meters relay	8th	
Women's	2013 Indoor	Paris Daniels	4 × 400 meters relay	8th	
Women's	2013 Indoor	Taylor Washington	4 × 400 meters relay	8th	
Women's	2013 Indoor	Diamond Dixon	4 × 400 meters relay	8th	
Women's	2013 Indoor	Natalia Bartnovskaya	Pole vault	1st	
Women's	2013 Indoor	Andrea Geubelle	Long jump	1st	
Women's	2013 Indoor	Francine Simpson	Long jump	3rd	
Women's	2013 Indoor	Andrea Geubelle	Triple jump	1st	
Women's	2013 Indoor	Alena Krechyk	Weight throw	6th	
Men's	2013 Outdoor	Michael Stigler	400 meters hurdles	2nd	
Women's	2013 Outdoor	Paris Daniels	200 meters	4th	
Women's	2013 Outdoor	Paris Daniels	4 × 100 meters relay	5th	
Women's	2013 Outdoor	Tianna Valentine	4 × 100 meters relay	5th	
Women's	2013 Outdoor	Denesha Morris	4 × 100 meters relay	5th	
Women's	2013 Outdoor	Diamond Dixon	4 × 100 meters relay	5th	
Women's	2013 Outdoor	Denesha Morris	4 × 400 meters relay	6th	
Women's	2013 Outdoor	Diamond Dixon	4 × 400 meters relay	6th	
Women's	2013 Outdoor	Taylor Washington	4 × 400 meters relay	6th	
Women's	2013 Outdoor	Paris Daniels	4 × 400 meters relay	6th	
Women's	2013 Outdoor	Natalia Bartnovskaya	Pole vault	2nd	
Women's	2013 Outdoor	Andrea Geubelle	Long jump	2nd	
Women's	2013 Outdoor	Andrea Geubelle	Triple jump	2nd	
Women's	2013 Outdoor	Jessica Maroszek	Discus throw	4th	
Women's	2013 Outdoor	Alena Krechyk	Hammer throw	3rd	
Women's	2013 Outdoor	Heather Bergmann	Javelin throw	6th	
Women's	2013 Outdoor	Lindsay Vollmer	Heptathlon	1st	
Women's	2014 Indoor	Sydney Conley	Long jump	4th	
Men's	2014 Outdoor	Michael Stigler	400 meters hurdles	2nd	
Women's	2014 Outdoor	Sydney Conley	Long jump	7th	
Women's	2014 Outdoor	Jessica Maroszek	Discus throw	6th	
Men's	2015 Indoor	Casey Bowen	Pole vault	7th	
Men's	2015 Outdoor	Michael Stigler	400 meters hurdles	1st	
Women's	2015 Outdoor	Sydney Conley	Long jump	5th	
Women's	2015 Outdoor	Daina Levy	Hammer throw	6th	
Women's	2016 Indoor	Sharon Lokedi	5000 meters	6th	
Women's	2016 Indoor	Daina Levy	Weight throw	3rd	
Women's	2016 Outdoor	Sharon Lokedi	10,000 meters	6th	
Men's	2017 Indoor	Barden Adams	Triple jump	5th	
Men's	2017 Indoor	Nicolai Ceban	Shot put	7th	
Men's	2017 Indoor	Gleb Dudarev	Weight throw	6th	
Women's	2017 Indoor	Riley Cooney	Distance medley relay	7th	
Women's	2017 Indoor	Nicole Montgomery	Distance medley relay	7th	
Women's	2017 Indoor	Whitney Adams	Distance medley relay	7th	
Women's	2017 Indoor	Hannah Richardson	Distance medley relay	7th	
Men's	2017 Outdoor	Hussain al Hizam	Pole vault	3rd	
Men's	2017 Outdoor	Barden Adams	Triple jump	5th	
Men's	2017 Outdoor	Mitchell Cooper	Discus throw	6th	
Men's	2017 Outdoor	Gleb Dudarev	Hammer throw	3rd	
Women's	2017 Outdoor	Sharon Lokedi	10,000 meters	3rd	
Women's	2017 Outdoor	Sydney Conley	Long jump	3rd	
Men's	2018 Indoor	Bryce Hoppel	800 meters	8th	
Men's	2018 Indoor	Hussain al Hizam	Pole vault	1st	
Men's	2018 Indoor	Barden Adams	Triple jump	8th	
Women's	2018 Indoor	Sharon Lokedi	3000 meters	6th	
Women's	2018 Indoor	Sharon Lokedi	5000 meters	3rd	
Women's	2018 Indoor	Laura Taylor	Pole vault	6th	
Men's	2018 Outdoor	Bryce Hoppel	800 meters	4th	
Men's	2018 Outdoor	Hussain al Hizam	Pole vault	5th	
Women's	2018 Outdoor	Courtney Coppinger	3000 meters steeplechase	7th	
Women's	2018 Outdoor	Sharon Lokedi	10,000 meters	1st	
Men's	2019 Indoor	Bryce Hoppel	800 meters	1st	
Men's	2019 Indoor	Zach Bradford	Pole vault	5th	
Men's	2019 Indoor	Hussain al Hizam	Pole vault	6th	
Men's	2019 Outdoor	Bryce Hoppel	800 meters	1st	
Men's	2019 Outdoor	Zach Bradford	Pole vault	6th	
Men's	2019 Outdoor	Gleb Dudarev	Hammer throw	2nd	
Women's	2019 Outdoor	Alexandra Emilianov	Discus throw	4th	
Men's	2021 Indoor	Zach Bradford	Pole vault	3rd	
Women's	2021 Indoor	Samantha van Hoecke	Pole vault	7th	
Men's	2021 Outdoor	Zach Bradford	Pole vault	5th	
Men's	2021 Outdoor	Hussain al Hizam	Pole vault	7th	
Men's	2021 Outdoor	Gleb Dudarev	Hammer throw	2nd	
Women's	2021 Outdoor	Samantha van Hoecke	Pole vault	8th	
Women's	2021 Outdoor	Alexandra Emilianov	Discus throw	8th	
Men's	2022 Indoor	Zach Bradford	Pole vault	7th	
Men's	2022 Indoor	Clayton Simms	Pole vault	8th	
Women's	2022 Indoor	Rylee Anderson	High jump	8th	
Men's	2022 Outdoor	Clayton Simms	Pole vault	7th	
Women's	2022 Outdoor	Alexandra Emilianov	Discus throw	2nd	
Men's	2023 Indoor	Michael Joseph	400 meters	7th	
Men's	2023 Indoor	Devin Loudermilk	High jump	3rd	
Men's	2023 Indoor	Clayton Simms	Pole vault	5th	
Women's	2023 Indoor	Rylee Anderson	High jump	2nd	
Men's	2023 Outdoor	Clayton Simms	Pole vault	5th	
Men's	2024 Indoor	Devin Loudermilk	High jump	3rd	
Men's	2024 Indoor	Clayton Simms	Pole vault	6th	
Men's	2024 Outdoor	Chandler Gibbens	10,000 meters	5th	
Men's	2024 Outdoor	Devin Loudermilk	High jump	5th	
Men's	2024 Outdoor	Clayton Simms	Pole vault	2nd	
Men's	2024 Outdoor	Dimitrios Pavlidis	Discus throw	3rd	
Women's	2025 Indoor	Mason Meinershagen	Pole vault	4th	
Men's	2025 Outdoor	Ashton Barkdull	Pole vault	2nd	
Men's	2025 Outdoor	Bryce Barkdull	Pole vault	5th	
Men's	2025 Outdoor	Dimitrios Pavlidis	Discus throw	6th	
Men's	2025 Outdoor	Alexander Jung	Decathlon	7th	
Women's	2025 Outdoor	Erica Ellis	Pole vault	4th	

== See also ==
- Category:Kansas Jayhawks men's track and field athletes (49)
- Category:Kansas Jayhawks women's track and field athletes (8)
