= Air Force Falcons track and field =

American college track and field team

- University: United States Air Force Academy
- Head coach: Ryan Cole
- Conference: MW
- Location: Air Force Academy, Colorado
- Outdoor track: Cadet Outdoor Track Complex
- Nickname: Falcons
- Colors: Blue and silver

The Air Force Falcons track and field team is the track and field program that represents United States Air Force Academy. The Falcons compete in NCAA Division I as a member of the Mountain West Conference. The team is based in Air Force Academy, Colorado, at the Cadet Outdoor Track Complex.

The program is coached by Ryan Cole. The track and field program officially encompasses four teams because the NCAA considers men's and women's indoor track and field and outdoor track and field as separate sports.

Runner Jim Murphy won the first national title for the Falcons, finishing in a dead heat in the 5000 meters at the 1964 NCAA University Division track and field championships. It was the first dead heat finish in NCAA championships history.

== Postseason ==
As of August 2025, a total of 24 men and 9 women have achieved individual first-team All-American status for the team at the Division I men's outdoor, women's outdoor, men's indoor, or women's indoor national championships (using the modern criteria of top-8 placing regardless of athlete nationality).

First team NCAA All-Americans
Team	Championships	Name	Event	Place	Ref.
Men's	1964 Outdoor	Jim Murphy	5000 meters	1st	
Men's	1965 Indoor	Dave Dick	55 meters hurdles	4th	
Men's	1965 Outdoor	Robert Lambert	Javelin throw	6th	
Men's	1966 Indoor	Dale Stovall	400 meters	3rd	
Men's	1966 Indoor	Doug Withers	400 meters	5th	
Men's	1967 Indoor	Doug Withers	400 meters	3rd	
Men's	1971 Indoor	John Perrigo	600 yards	4th	
Men's	1971 Indoor	John Jones	3000 meters	4th	
Men's	1983 Indoor	Alonzo Babers	600 yards	5th	
Men's	1983 Outdoor	Alonzo Babers	400 meters	4th	
Men's	1984 Indoor	Daniel Rojas	800 meters	2nd	
Women's	1984 Indoor	Norphesia Gail Conway	500 meters	2nd	
Women's	1984 Outdoor	Norphesia Gail Conway	800 meters	6th	
Men's	1996 Indoor	Eric Mack	3000 meters	4th	
Men's	1996 Outdoor	Eric Mack	5000 meters	8th	
Men's	1996 Outdoor	Marcus Nichols	Decathlon	3rd	
Men's	1997 Indoor	Andrew Marx	3000 meters	6th	
Men's	2004 Indoor	Paul Gensic	Pole vault	6th	
Men's	2004 Outdoor	Paul Gensic	Pole vault	4th	
Women's	2004 Outdoor	Dana Pounds	Javelin throw	5th	
Men's	2005 Indoor	Paul Gensic	Pole vault	3rd	
Women's	2005 Outdoor	Dana Pounds	Javelin throw	1st	
Women's	2006 Outdoor	Olivia Korte	Discus throw	7th	
Women's	2006 Outdoor	Dana Pounds	Javelin throw	1st	
Men's	2008 Outdoor	Nick Frawley	Pole vault	2nd	
Men's	2009 Indoor	Nick Frawley	Pole vault	7th	
Men's	2009 Outdoor	Nick Frawley	Pole vault	7th	
Women's	2009 Outdoor	Sara Neubauer	Shot put	8th	
Women's	2009 Outdoor	Sara Neubauer	Discus throw	7th	
Men's	2010 Indoor	Justin Tyner	5000 meters	3rd	
Men's	2010 Outdoor	Nick Frawley	Pole vault	3rd	
Women's	2010 Outdoor	Sara Neubauer	Discus throw	7th	
Men's	2011 Indoor	Justin Tyner	3000 meters	5th	
Men's	2011 Outdoor	Justin Tyner	3000 meters steeplechase	8th	
Men's	2012 Indoor	Cale Simmons	Pole vault	5th	
Men's	2012 Outdoor	Cale Simmons	Pole vault	5th	
Men's	2013 Outdoor	Zach Perkins	1500 meters	2nd	
Men's	2014 Indoor	Joey Uhle	Pole vault	7th	
Men's	2015 Outdoor	Zach Perkins	1500 meters	2nd	
Men's	2016 Indoor	Taylor Smith	High jump	2nd	
Women's	2016 Indoor	Hannah Everson	5000 meters	7th	
Men's	2016 Outdoor	Patrick Corona	5000 meters	8th	
Men's	2016 Outdoor	Dylan Bell	Pole vault	6th	
Women's	2016 Outdoor	Hannah Everson	10,000 meters	3rd	
Women's	2017 Indoor	Shelley Spires	High jump	6th	
Women's	2018 Indoor	Shelley Spires	High jump	7th	
Women's	2018 Outdoor	Jaci Smith	10,000 meters	8th	
Women's	2018 Outdoor	Shelley Spires	High jump	4th	
Men's	2019 Indoor	Michael Rhoads	800 meters	8th	
Women's	2019 Indoor	Jaci Smith	5000 meters	6th	
Men's	2019 Outdoor	Michael Rhoads	800 meters	6th	
Women's	2021 Indoor	Mahala Norris	5000 meters	4th	
Women's	2021 Outdoor	Mahala Norris	3000 meters steeplechase	1st	
Women's	2021 Outdoor	Maria Mettler	10,000 meters	3rd	
Men's	2022 Outdoor	Sam Gilman	5000 meters	5th	
Men's	2025 Outdoor	Texas Tanner	Hammer throw	4th	

== See also ==
- Category:Air Force Falcons men's track and field athletes (4)
- Category:Air Force Falcons women's track and field athletes (1)
