= Duke Blue Devils track and field =

College track and field team

- University: Duke University
- Head coach: Shawn Wilbourn
- Conference: ACC
- Location: Durham, North Carolina
- Outdoor track: Morris Williams Track and Field Stadium
- Nickname: Blue Devils
- Colors: Duke blue and white

The Duke Blue Devils track and field team is the track and field program that represents Duke University. The Blue Devils compete in NCAA Division I as a member of the Atlantic Coast Conference. The team is based in Durham, North Carolina at the Morris Williams Track and Field Stadium.

The program is coached by Shawn Wilbourn. The track and field program officially encompasses four teams, as the NCAA regards men's and women's indoor track and field and outdoor track and field as separate sports.

Curtis Beach won the 2012 and 2014 NCAA titles in the indoor heptathlon, making him the only Duke athlete to win more than one collegiate national championship.

== Postseason ==
=== AIAW ===
The Blue Devils have had one AIAW All-American finishing in the top six at the AIAW indoor or outdoor championships.

AIAW All-Americans
| Championships | Name | Event | Place |
|---|---|---|---|
| 1978 Outdoor | Ellison Goodall | 3000 meters | 3rd |
| 1978 Outdoor | Ellison Goodall | 5000 meters | 4th |

=== NCAA ===
As of 2024, a total of 23 men and 24 women have achieved individual first-team All-American status at the men's outdoor, women's outdoor, men's indoor, or women's indoor national championships.

First team NCAA All-Americans
| Team | Championships | Name | Event | Place | Ref. |
|---|---|---|---|---|---|
| Men's | 1931 Outdoor | John Brownlee | 220 yards hurdles | 3rd | |
| Men's | 1937 Outdoor | John Karakash | Javelin throw | 6th | |
| Men's | 1939 Outdoor | Hubert Reavis | 220 yards hurdles | >6th | |
| Men's | 1939 Outdoor | Donn Kinzle | 110 meters hurdles | 5th | |
| Men's | 1955 Outdoor | Joel Shankle | 110 meters hurdles | 3rd | |
| Men's | 1955 Outdoor | Joel Shankle | Long jump | 1st | |
| Men's | 1956 Outdoor | Dave Sime | 100 meters | 2nd | |
| Men's | 1959 Outdoor | Cary Weisiger | Mile run | 7th | |
| Men's | 1959 Outdoor | Jared Nourse | 5000 meters | 7th | |
| Men's | 1960 Outdoor | Cary Weisiger | 1500 meters | 8th | |
| Men's | 1963 Outdoor | Richard Gesswein | Shot put | 8th | |
| Men's | 1966 Outdoor | Rod Stewart | Shot put | 6th | |
| Men's | 1968 Outdoor | Jeff Howser | 110 meters hurdles | 4th | |
| Men's | 1968 Outdoor | Ed Stenberg | 10,000 meters | 4th | |
| Men's | 1969 Indoor | Jeff Howser | 55 meters hurdles | 4th | |
| Men's | 1971 Indoor | Jeff Howser | 55 meters hurdles | 5th | |
| Men's | 1971 Indoor | Bob Wheeler | 1000 meters | 1st | |
| Men's | 1971 Outdoor | Jeff Howser | 110 meters hurdles | 6th | |
| Men's | 1971 Outdoor | Bob Wheeler | Mile run | 2nd | |
| Men's | 1972 Outdoor | Bob Wheeler | 1500 meters | 3rd | |
| Men's | 1972 Outdoor | Roger Beardmore | 3000 meters steeplechase | 5th | |
| Men's | 1973 Outdoor | Roger Beardmore | 3000 meters steeplechase | 4th | |
| Men's | 1976 Outdoor | Robbie Perkins | 10,000 meters | 8th | |
| Men's | 1981 Indoor | Richard Block | Distance medley relay | 4th | |
| Men's | 1981 Indoor | Chris Castor | Distance medley relay | 4th | |
| Men's | 1981 Indoor | John Donegan | Distance medley relay | 4th | |
| Men's | 1981 Indoor | Bryan Allf | Distance medley relay | 4th | |
| Women's | 1985 Outdoor | Ellen Reynolds | 10,000 meters | 6th | |
| Women's | 1986 Outdoor | Ellen Reynolds | 10,000 meters | 3rd | |
| Men's | 1999 Outdoor | Jesse Allen | 400 meters hurdles | 4th | |
| Women's | 2000 Outdoor | Jillian Schwartz | Pole vault | 3rd | |
| Women's | 2001 Indoor | Jillian Schwartz | Pole vault | 7th | |
| Women's | 2001 Outdoor | Jillian Schwartz | Pole vault | 2nd | |
| Men's | 2003 Outdoor | Brent Warner | Pole vault | 8th | |
| Women's | 2004 Indoor | Shannon Rowbury | Mile run | 8th | |
| Women's | 2004 Outdoor | Clara Horowitz | 5000 meters | 5th | |
| Women's | 2005 Indoor | Shannon Rowbury | Mile run | 2nd | |
| Women's | 2005 Indoor | Paige Miller | 3000 meters | 6th | |
| Women's | 2005 Indoor | Debra Vento | High jump | 7th | |
| Women's | 2005 Outdoor | Shannon Rowbury | 1500 meters | 8th | |
| Women's | 2005 Outdoor | Liz Wort | 3000 meters steeplechase | 4th | |
| Women's | 2005 Outdoor | Debra Vento | High jump | 3rd | |
| Women's | 2006 Indoor | Clara Horowitz | 5000 meters | 2nd | |
| Women's | 2006 Outdoor | Clara Horowitz | 10,000 meters | 2nd | |
| Women's | 2006 Outdoor | Sally Meyerhoff | 10,000 meters | 7th | |
| Women's | 2007 Indoor | Shannon Rowbury | Mile run | 1st | |
| Women's | 2007 Indoor | Shannon Rowbury | 3000 meters | 2nd | |
| Women's | 2007 Outdoor | Liz Wort | 3000 meters steeplechase | 4th | |
| Women's | 2007 Outdoor | Madeline McKeever | 5000 meters | 5th | |
| Women's | 2008 Indoor | Madeline McKeever | 5000 meters | 3rd | |
| Men's | 2008 Outdoor | John Austin | Javelin throw | 8th | |
| Women's | 2009 Outdoor | Molly Lehman | 1500 meters | 7th | |
| Women's | 2011 Indoor | Kate van Buskirk | Mile run | 2nd | |
| Men's | 2011 Outdoor | Curtis Beach | Decathlon | 2nd | |
| Women's | 2011 Outdoor | Cydney Ross | 800 meters | 8th | |
| Women's | 2011 Outdoor | Kate van Buskirk | 1500 meters | 3rd | |
| Women's | 2011 Outdoor | Juliet Bottorff | 10,000 meters | 1st | |
| Men's | 2012 Indoor | Curtis Beach | Heptathlon | 1st | |
| Women's | 2012 Outdoor | Michelle Anumba | Shot put | 8th | |
| Women's | 2013 Indoor | Cydney Ross | 800 meters | 6th | |
| Women's | 2013 Indoor | Juliet Bottorff | 5000 meters | 7th | |
| Men's | 2013 Outdoor | Curtis Beach | Decathlon | 7th | |
| Women's | 2013 Outdoor | Cydney Ross | 800 meters | 7th | |
| Men's | 2014 Indoor | Tanner Anderson | High jump | 8th | |
| Men's | 2014 Indoor | Curtis Beach | Heptathlon | 1st | |
| Women's | 2014 Indoor | Juliet Bottorff | 5000 meters | 5th | |
| Women's | 2014 Outdoor | Juliet Bottorff | 5000 meters | 5th | |
| Women's | 2014 Outdoor | Juliet Bottorff | 10,000 meters | 3rd | |
| Men's | 2015 Indoor | Brian Schoepfer | Distance medley relay | 7th | |
| Men's | 2015 Indoor | Brett Bofinger | Distance medley relay | 7th | |
| Men's | 2015 Indoor | Henry Farley | Distance medley relay | 7th | |
| Men's | 2015 Indoor | Nate McClafferty | Distance medley relay | 7th | |
| Women's | 2015 Indoor | Lauren Hansson | 4 × 400 meters relay | 6th | |
| Women's | 2015 Indoor | Madeline Kopp | 4 × 400 meters relay | 6th | |
| Women's | 2015 Indoor | Madeline Price | 4 × 400 meters relay | 6th | |
| Women's | 2015 Indoor | Elizabeth Kerpon | 4 × 400 meters relay | 6th | |
| Women's | 2015 Indoor | Megan Clark | Pole vault | 2nd | |
| Men's | 2015 Outdoor | Thomas Lang | Javelin throw | 6th | |
| Women's | 2016 Indoor | Anima Banks | 800 meters | 8th | |
| Women's | 2016 Indoor | Megan Clark | Pole vault | 2nd | |
| Women's | 2016 Outdoor | Anima Banks | 800 meters | 6th | |
| Women's | 2016 Outdoor | Megan Clark | Pole vault | 5th | |
| Women's | 2017 Outdoor | Katelyn Gochenour | Javelin throw | 6th | |
| Women's | 2018 Indoor | Madison Heath | Pole vault | 8th | |
| Women's | 2021 Indoor | Erin Marsh | Pentathlon | 3rd | |
| Women's | 2021 Outdoor | Cha'Mia Rothwell | 100 meters hurdles | 7th | |
| Women's | 2021 Outdoor | Iman Sule | 4 × 400 meters relay | 7th | |
| Women's | 2021 Outdoor | Elena Brown-Soler | 4 × 400 meters relay | 7th | |
| Women's | 2021 Outdoor | Lauren Hoffman | 4 × 400 meters relay | 7th | |
| Women's | 2021 Outdoor | Brittany Aveni | 4 × 400 meters relay | 7th | |
| Women's | 2021 Outdoor | Erin Marsh | Heptathlon | 4th | |
| Men's | 2022 Indoor | Nick Dahl | Mile run | 6th | |
| Women's | 2022 Indoor | Erin Marsh | Pentathlon | 2nd | |
| Women's | 2022 Indoor | Isabel Wakefield | Pentathlon | 7th | |
| Women's | 2022 Outdoor | Lauren Hoffman | 400 meters hurdles | 3rd | |
| Women's | 2022 Outdoor | Erin Marsh | Heptathlon | 3rd | |
| Women's | 2023 Indoor | Amina Maatoug | Mile run | 7th | |
| Women's | 2023 Outdoor | Amina Maatoug | 5000 meters | 5th | |
| Women's | 2023 Outdoor | Julia Jackson | 4 × 400 meters relay | 8th | |
| Women's | 2023 Outdoor | Lauren Tolbert | 4 × 400 meters relay | 8th | |
| Women's | 2023 Outdoor | Madison Mulder | 4 × 400 meters relay | 8th | |
| Women's | 2023 Outdoor | Megan McGinnis | 4 × 400 meters relay | 8th | |
| Men's | 2024 Outdoor | Simen Guttormsen | Pole vault | 3rd | |
| Women's | 2024 Outdoor | Lauren Tolbert | 800 meters | 8th | |

== See also ==
- Category:Duke Blue Devils men's track and field athletes (12)
- Category:Duke Blue Devils women's track and field athletes (9)
