= Mike Mercer (shot putter) =

Canadian shot putter (born 1947)

Personal information
- Born: Mike Mercer; April 28, 1947 (age 79)

Sport
- Sport: Athletics
- Event: Shot put
Medal record
Representing Canada
Pan American Games
Bronze medal – third place	1971 Cali	Shot put

Mike Mercer (born April 28, 1947) is a Canadian former athlete who competed in shot put.

Mercer attended Oakville Trafalgar High School. He was an All-American thrower for the Utah State Aggies track and field team, finishing runner-up in the shot put at the 1968 NCAA indoor track and field championships.

As a specialist in shot put, Mercer won Canada's national championship in 1971 and claimed a bronze medal at the 1971 Pan American Games in Cali, behind Americans Al Feuerbach and Karl Salb. He also had a fourth-place finish at the 1978 Commonwealth Games and was third at the 1981 Pacific Conference Games.

Mercer became a powerlifter in the 1980s after growing frustrated with athletics and set multiple Canadian records.
