= Athletics at the 1971 Pan American Games – Men's shot put =

Men's shot put at the Pan American Games

The men's shot put event at the 1971 Pan American Games was held in Cali on 2 August.

== Results ==
Rank	Name	Nationality	Result	Notes
1st place, gold medalist(s)	Al Feuerbach	United States	19.76	
2nd place, silver medalist(s)	Karl Salb	United States	19.10	
3rd place, bronze medalist(s)	Mike Mercer	Canada	18.01	
4	José Carlos Jacques	Brazil	17.32	
5	Mario Peretti	Argentina	16.23	
6	Benigno Hodelín	Cuba	16.21	
7	Jorge Marrero	Puerto Rico	15.02	
8	Wilfred Burgos	Suriname	14.28	
9	Ramón Mejía	Nicaragua	12.67	
