= Terry Porter (pole vaulter) =

American pole vaulter (born 1951)

Personal information
- Nationality: American
- Born: August 5, 1951 (age 74) Fort Worth, Texas, United States

Sport
- Sport: Athletics
- Event: Pole vault
Medal record
Representing United States
Summer Universiade
Silver medal – second place	1973 Moscow	Pole vault

Terry Porter (born August 5, 1951) is an American athlete. He competed in the men's pole vault at the 1976 Summer Olympics.

Competing for the Kansas Jayhawks track and field team, Porter won the 1973 pole vault at the NCAA Division I Indoor Track and Field Championships with a jump of 5.18 meters.
