= 1970 NCAA University Division Outdoor Track and Field Championships =

- Team Champions: BYU (1st title), Kansas (3rd title), and Oregon (4th title)
- Edition: 49th
- Dates: June 16−18, 1970
- Host city: Des Moines, Iowa
- Venue: Drake Stadium; Drake University

The 1970 NCAA University Division Outdoor Track and Field Championships were contested June 16−18 at the 49th annual NCAA-sanctioned track meet to determine the individual and team national champions of men's collegiate University Division outdoor track and field events in the United States.

That year's outdoor meet was hosted by Drake University at Drake Stadium (the same location as the eponymous Drake Relays) in Des Moines, Iowa.

BYU, Kansas, and Oregon finished tied atop the team standings, with 35 points each. All three were declared co-champions; it was the Cougars' first title, the Jayhawks' third, and the Ducks' fourth.

The California Golden Bears track and field team originally placed 1st with 40 points, but were later reassigned a score of 18 points for 8th place. The points were deducted in January 1971 because one of their sprinters, Isaac Curtis, was deemed ineligible.

== Program changes ==
- The decathlon was contested at the NCAA championships for the first time this year.

== Results summary ==
=== Team standings ===
- Note: Top 10 only
- (H) = Hosts
- Full results

Rank	Team	Points
1st place, gold medalist(s)	BYU; Kansas; Oregon	35
2nd place, silver medalist(s)	Washington State	31
3rd place, bronze medalist(s)	Oregon State	30
4	UTEP	28
5	UCLA	27
6	Villanova	26
7	USC	22
8	Bowling Green State; California	18
9	San Diego State	17
10	Tennessee	16

=== Individual event champions ===
Event	Gold		Silver		Bronze	
100 yard dash	Eddie Hart	University of California	Isaac Curtis	University of California	Jim Green	University of Kentucky
220 yard dash	Willie Turner	Oregon State University	Mel Gray	University of Missouri	Mike Goodrich	Indiana University
440 yard dash	Tom Turner	Murray State University	Curtis Mills	Texas A&M University	John Smith	UCLA
880 yard run	Ken Swenson	Kansas State University	Pat Collins	Oregon State University	Art Sandison	Washington State University
One mile run	Marty Liquori	Villanova University	Dave Wottle	Bowling Green State University	Howell Michael	College of William & Mary
3,000 meter steeplechase	Sidney Sink	Bowling Green State University	Jerome Liebenberg	Western Michigan University	Steve Savage	University of Oregon
Three mile run	Steve Prefontaine	University of Oregon	Gary Bjorklund	University of Minnesota	Richard Buerkle	Villanova University
Six mile run	Robert Bertelsen	Ohio University	David Hindley	Brigham Young University	Jon Anderson	Cornell University
