= Bill Dotson =

American middle-distance runner (1940–2021)

William Robert Dotson (December 27, 1940 – June 16, 2021) was a track and field athlete from the University of Kansas. He was the seventh person in the United States to break the four-minute mile barrier, with a time of 3:59.0 on June 23, 1962. In 2016 he was selected for inclusion in the Kansas Sports Hall of Fame.

Dotson graduated from Concordia High School in 1958, where as an athlete he broke Glenn Cunningham's mile record that had stood for 28 years. After high school, Dotson enrolled at the University of Kansas and went on to become a two-time All-American. He won five Big Eight Conference track titles (three indoor and two outdoor titles) and won the Big Eight Conference title in cross country in 1961. Dotson set three American records in the mile during his career. At the 1963 Chicago Daily News Invitational, he became the fourth man in the world to run a mile under four minutes on an indoor track. During his running career, he was regularly listed as one of the top middle-distance runners in the United States.

After his running career, he took up a career in finance. He lived in Santa Monica, California for over 40 years, moving to Nebraska for health reasons in 2021. Dotson died June 16, 2021, in York, Nebraska.
