= 1955 NCAA track and field championships =

1955 NCAA Track and Field Championships
- Team Champion: USC (19th title)
- Edition: 34th
- Dates: June 17−18, 1955
- Host city: Los Angeles, California; University of Southern California
- Venue: Los Angeles Memorial Coliseum

The 1955 NCAA Track and Field Championships were contested June 17−18 at the 34th annual NCAA-sanctioned track meet to determine the individual and team national champions of men's collegiate track and field in the United States. This year's events were hosted by the University of Southern California at the Los Angeles Memorial Coliseum in Los Angeles.

Hosts USC won their seventh consecutive team national championship, the Trojans' 19th title in program history.

== Team result ==
- Note: Top 10 finishers only
- (H) = Hosts

Rank	Team	Points
1st place, gold medalist(s)	USC (H)	42
2nd place, silver medalist(s)	UCLA	34
3rd place, bronze medalist(s)	Kansas	30
4	Oregon	29
5	Northwestern	20
6	Manhattan; Villanova	18
7	Duke	16
8	Occidental; Penn State	14
9	Florida; Michigan; Penn	13
10	Miami (OH)	12

== See also ==
- NCAA Men's Outdoor Track and Field Championship
- 1954 NCAA Men's Cross Country Championships
