= Charlie Tidwell =

American sprinter and hurdler

Charles Tidwell
Personal information
- Born: March 30, 1937 Independence, Kansas, United States
- Died: August 28, 1969 (aged 32) Denver, Colorado, United States
- Height: 1.86 m (6 ft 1 in)
- Weight: 75 kg (165 lb)

Sport
- Sport: Running
- Events: 100 meters, 200 meters/220 yards, 200 m /220 y hurdles
- College team: Kansas Jayhawks

Charles Tidwell (March 30, 1937 – August 28, 1969) was an American track athlete who was one of the best sprinter/hurdlers in the world in the years 1958–60. He was denied a chance to run in the 1960 Olympics by injury.

In 1969, at age 32, he killed himself after murdering his wife following a violent quarrel between the two.

== Track career ==
Tidwell was a native of Independence, Kansas, where he was a star athlete at his high school. He achieved a national junior record for the 180 yards low hurdles in his junior year in 1955. After graduating high school he attended the University of Kansas.

Tidwell was an outstanding sprinter for his college track team, the Kansas Jayhawks, winning five NCAA individual titles:

- 100 yard in 1959-60 (he was also 2nd in 1958)
- 220 yard in 1960
- 220 yard Hurdling in 1958 (he was also 2nd in 1959)

These scores helped the team win back-to-back NCAA team titles in 1959 and 1960. In the 1958 NCAA championships, Tidwell set a world best time in the 220 yard hurdles.

Tidwell also won the Kansas Relays 100 yard race in 1959 and 1960, winning Athlete of the Meet in 1959, and for this was honored as an inductee in the Kansas Relays Hall of Fame in 2005.

Tidwell's form meant he was one of the favorites to going into the United States Olympic Trials to qualify for the 100 and 200 m at the 1960 Rome Olympics. However, an injury suffered at the trials ruined his qualification chances. Tidwell had qualified first in his heat for the final of the 100 m. In the final, Tidwell had one false start. As the race finally got underway, a pulled muscle at 50 m prematurely ended his race. The injury forced him to scratch from the 200 m trial event.

Tidwell achieved five world best times during his career - none were ratified as world records by the IAAF:

- on 14 June 1958 in Berkeley, California, he ran the 220 yard hurdles in a new record time of 22.7 s. The 220 yard hurdles event was not officially recognized by the IAAF.
- on 16 May 1959 in Norman, Oklahoma, he equalled his time of 22.7 s for the 220 yard hurdles. The 220 yard hurdles event was not officially recognized by the IAAF.
- on 20 June 1959 in Boulder, Colorado, he ran the 200 meter hurdles in a new record time of 22.6 s. The 200 meter hurdles event was not officially recognized by the IAAF.
- on 16 April 1960 in Abilene, Texas, he ran a 220 yards race in 20.2 s - the course was found to be short at 218 yard 10" (199.60 m). Adding another 0.1 s for the missing distance to 200 m gives a time of 20.3 s, surpassing the world record for that distance of 20.5 s.
- on 10 June 1960 in Houston, Texas, he matched the world record for the 100 m with a time of 10.1 s. Armin Hary ran a new world record of 10.0 s on 21 June.

== American Football career ==
In 1962, Tidwell tried out with the National Football League team the Minnesota Vikings. However, his tryout was unsuccessful and he was cut from the squad later that year.

== Later life ==
In August 1969, Tidwell was involved in a domestic dispute that led to the death of both himself and his estranged wife, Karen.

Reports state that he shot his wife at the house of one of her neighbors, then turned the gun on himself after a violent quarrel. The incident took place in Denver, Colorado where Tidwell and his wife were living at the time.

== Rankings ==
Tidwell was ranked among the best in the US and the world in both the 100 meter/100 yard and 200 meter/220 yard sprint events in 1959 and 1960, according to the votes of the experts of Track & Field News.

100 meters
Year	World rank	US rank
1959	2nd	2nd
1960	3rd	2nd

200 meters
Year	World rank	US rank
1959	-	-
1960	4th	2nd
