= Mark Enyeart =

American middle-distance runner

Mark Bruce Enyeart (born October 9, 1953, in Alliance, Nebraska) is an American former middle distance runner who competed in the 1976 Summer Olympics. Enyeart was a quarter miler for Utah State University. He converted to running the half mile in the 1975 season. Still adjusting to the event, he was the surprise winner of the National Championships later that year, holding off world record holder and twice consecutive National Champion Rick Wohlhuter.
