= 1959 NCAA Track and Field Championships =

- Edition: 38th
- Dates: June 12−13, 1959
- Host city: Lincoln, Nebraska; University of Nebraska
- Venue: Memorial Stadium

The 1959 NCAA Track and Field Championships were contested June 12−13 at the 38th annual NCAA-sanctioned track meet to determine the individual and team national champions of men's collegiate track and field events in the United States. This year's meet was hosted by the University of Nebraska at Memorial Stadium in Lincoln.

Kansas won the team national championship, the Jayhawks' first team title.

== Program changes ==
- The two-mile run event was discontinued after being held annually since 1921.
- The 5,000 meter run was added to the NCAA championship program, the first new event since 1948.

== Team result ==
- Note: Top 10 only
- (H) = Hosts

Rank	Team	Points
1st place, gold medalist(s)	Kansas	73
2nd place, silver medalist(s)	San José State	48 1/10
3rd place, bronze medalist(s)	Houston	38
4	Oklahoma	31
5	Oklahoma State	22 1/10
6	Boston University; Eastern Michigan	20
7	Missouri	19
8	Illinois	18 1/4
9	New Mexico	18
10	Oregon State	17

== See also ==
- NCAA Men's Outdoor Track and Field Championship
- 1958 NCAA Men's Cross Country Championships
