= Michael Stigler =

American hurdler

Personal information
- Nationality: American
- Born: May 4, 1992 (age 34)
- Height: 5'10
- Weight: 160

Sport
- Country: United States
- Sport: Track and field
- Event: 400 metres hurdles

Achievements and titles
- Personal bests: 110 m Hurdles: 13.67 s (Austin 2011); 400 m Hurdles: 48.26 s (Sacramento 2017)

Michael Stigler (born May 4, 1992) is an American track and field athlete, specialising in hurdle races. In 2017, he finished second in the US Championship, behind Eric Futch, after running a personal best of 48.26 s in the 400 meters hurdles on June 25 in Sacramento.

In 2015, Stigler was considered the world's best 400 m hurdler.

== Education ==
Michael graduated with a degree in African American studies and minored in communications. He hopes to become a head coach at Division 1 school after his athletic career ends. One day, he also hopes that he will remodel and sell houses. Stigler volunteers at the Boys & Girls Clubs of America currently.
