= 2013 NCAA Division I Indoor Track and Field Championships =

- Dates: March 8-9, 2013
- Host city: Fayetteville, Arkansas; University of Arkansas
- Venue: Randal Tyson Track Center
- Events: 32

The 2013 NCAA Division I Indoor Track and Field Championships was the 48th NCAA Men's Division I Indoor Track and Field Championships and the 31st NCAA Women's Division I Indoor Track and Field Championships, held at the Randal Tyson Track Center in Fayetteville, Arkansas near the campus of the host school, University of Arkansas. In total, thirty-two different men's and women's indoor track and field events were contested from March 8 to March 9, 2013.

== Team scores ==
- Note: Top 3 only
- Scoring: 10 points for a 1st-place finish in an event, 8 points for 2nd, 6 points for 3rd, 5 points for 4th, 4 points for 5th, 3 points for 6th, 2 points for 7th, and 1 point for 8th.

=== Men's teams ===
Pl.	Team	Points
1	Arkansas	74
2	Florida	59
3	Wisconsin	33

=== Women's teams ===
Pl.	Team	Points
1	Oregon	56
2	Kansas	44
3	Louisiana State	43

== Results ==
=== Men ===
==== 60 meters ====
Rank	Athlete	Team	Time	Notes
1st place, gold medalist(s)	D'Angelo Cherry	Mississippi State	6.54	

==== 200 meters ====
Rank	Athlete	Team	Time	Notes
1st place, gold medalist(s)	Ameer Webb	Texas A&M	20.42	

==== 400 meters ====
Rank	Athlete	Team	Time	Notes
1st place, gold medalist(s)	Errol Nolan	Houston	45.75	

==== 800 meters ====
Rank	Athlete	Team	Time	Notes
1st place, gold medalist(s)	Elijah Greer	Oregon	1:47.13	

==== Mile run ====
Rank	Athlete	Team	Time	Notes
1st place, gold medalist(s)	Lawi Lalang	Arizona	3:54.74	

==== 3000 meters ====
Rank	Athlete	Team	Time	Notes
1st place, gold medalist(s)	Lawi Lalang	Arizona	7:45.94	

==== 5000 meters ====
Rank	Athlete	Team	Time	Notes
1st place, gold medalist(s)	Kennedy Kithuka	Texas Tech	13:25.38	

==== 60 meter hurdles ====
Rank	Athlete	Team	Time	Notes
1st place, gold medalist(s)	Eddie Lovett	Florida	7.50	

==== 4 × 400 meter relay ====
Rank	Athletes	Team	Time	Notes
1st place, gold medalist(s)	Marek Niit; Neil Braddy; Caleb Cross; Akheem Gauntlett	Arkansas	3:03.5	

==== Distance medley relay ====
Rank	Athletes	Team	Time	Notes
1st place, gold medalist(s)	Michael Williams; Austin Hollimon; Russell Dinkins; Peter Callahan	Princeton	9:33.01	

==== High jump ====
Rank	Athlete	Team	Mark	Notes
1st place, gold medalist(s)	Derek Drouin	Indiana	2.35 m	

==== Pole vault ====
Rank	Athlete	Team	Mark	Notes
1st place, gold medalist(s)	Andrew Irwin	Arkansas	5.70 m	

==== Long jump ====
Rank	Athlete	Team	Mark	Notes
1st place, gold medalist(s)	Marquis Dendy	Florida	8.28 m	

==== Triple jump ====
Rank	Athlete	Team	Mark	Notes
1st place, gold medalist(s)	Bryce Lamb	Texas Tech	16.96 m	

==== Shot put ====
Rank	Athlete	Team	Mark	Notes
1st place, gold medalist(s)	Jordan Clarke	Arizona State	20.50 m	

==== Weight throw ====
Rank	Athlete	Team	Mark	Notes
1st place, gold medalist(s)	Alexander Ziegler	Virginia Tech	22.46 m	

==== Heptathlon ====
Rank	Athlete	Team	Mark	Notes
1st place, gold medalist(s)	Kevin Lazas	Arkansas	6175 pts	

=== Women ===
==== 60 meters ====
Rank	Athlete	Team	Time	Notes
1st place, gold medalist(s)	Aurieyall Scott	Central Florida	7.13	

==== 200 meters ====
Rank	Athlete	Team	Time	Notes
1st place, gold medalist(s)	Kimberlyn Duncan	Louisiana State	22.58	

==== 400 meters ====
Rank	Athlete	Team	Time	Notes
1st place, gold medalist(s)	Shaunae Miller	Georgia	50.88	

==== 800 meters ====
Rank	Athlete	Team	Time	Notes
1st place, gold medalist(s)	Natoya Goule	Louisiana State	2:02.00	

==== Mile run ====
Rank	Athlete	Team	Time	Notes
1st place, gold medalist(s)	Emma Coburn	Colorado	4:29.91	

==== 3000 meters ====
Rank	Athlete	Team	Time	Notes
1st place, gold medalist(s)	Abbey D'Agostino	Dartmouth	9:01.08	

==== 5000 meters ====
Rank	Athlete	Team	Time	Notes
1st place, gold medalist(s)	Abbey D'Agostino	Dartmouth	15:28.11	

==== 60 meter hurdles ====
Rank	Athlete	Team	Time	Notes
1st place, gold medalist(s)	Brianna Rollins	Clemson	7.79	

==== 4 × 400 meter relay ====
Rank	Athletes	Team	Time	Notes
1st place, gold medalist(s)	English Gardner; Chizoba Okodogbe; Laura Roesler; Phyllis Francis	Oregon	3:30.22	

==== Distance medley relay ====
Rank	Athletes	Team	Time	Notes
1st place, gold medalist(s)	Rebecca Addison; Maya Long; Jillian Smith; Amanda Eccleston	Michigan	10:56.46	

==== High jump ====
Rank	Athlete	Team	Mark	Notes
1st place, gold medalist(s)	Brigetta Barrett	Arizona	1.95 m	

==== Pole vault ====
Rank	Athlete	Team	Mark	Notes
1st place, gold medalist(s)	Natalia Bartnovskaya	Kansas	4.45 m	

==== Long jump ====
Rank	Athlete	Team	Mark	Notes
1st place, gold medalist(s)	Andrea Geubelle	Kansas	6.55 m	

==== Triple jump ====
Rank	Athlete	Team	Mark	Notes
1st place, gold medalist(s)	Andrea Geubelle	Kansas	14.18 m	

==== Shot put ====
Rank	Athlete	Team	Mark	Notes
1st place, gold medalist(s)	Tia Brooks	Oklahoma	19.22 m	

==== Weight throw ====
Rank	Athlete	Team	Mark	Notes
1st place, gold medalist(s)	Felisha Johnson	Indiana State	23.52 m	

==== Pentathlon ====
Rank	Athlete	Team	Mark	Notes
1st place, gold medalist(s)	Erica Bougard	Mississippi State	4399 pts	

== See also ==
- NCAA Men's Division I Indoor Track and Field Championships
- NCAA Women's Division I Indoor Track and Field Championships
