= Gary C. Bjorklund =

American physicist

- Scientific career
- Fields: Physics
- Institutions: Stanford University

Gary Carl Bjorklund is an American physicist specializing in optics.

He was elected a Fellow of the American Physical Society in 1986 "for pioneering work in non linear optics and the development and application of widely used techniques in laser spectroscopy, such as frequency modulation spectroscopy"

He was president of the Optical Society of America in 1997. He is a Fellow of the society, and he received the Stephen D. Fantone Distinguished Service Award in 2010, "For long and distinguished service to the optics profession, including extraordinary leadership in guiding the OSA Foundation through its initial years and leading it to an impressive set of accomplishments."

== See also ==
- Optical Society of America § Past Presidents of the OSA
