= KU-KSU-WSU Triangular =

American college indoor track and field event

- Sport: Track and field
- Founded: Annual since 2015
- No. of teams: 3
- Country: Kansas, United States

The KU-KSU-WSU Triangular or the Sunflower Triangular is an indoor track and field contest between the three NCAA Division I track and field programs in the state of Kansas: The University of Kansas, Kansas State University, and Wichita State University. The triangular has been an annual event since 2015. Scoring for the meet is 7 – 5 – 4 – 3 – 2 – 1 (Relay 7 – 5 – 4) with only two athletes per institution counting in each event. The meet rotates between the three schools with each institution hosting the event every three years.
