= Chris McCubbins =

Middle-distance runner and Teacher

Raymond Christopher McCubbins (November 22, 1945 – August 21, 2009) was a middle-distance runner and teacher for the Winnipeg School Division from the United States. Born in Enid, Oklahoma in 1945, he won the gold medal in the men's 3000 meters steeplechase event at the 1967 Pan American Games. McCubbins later competed for Canada at the 1976 Olympics in the 10,000 meter event. McCubbins was a teacher at Kent Road School for 27 years.

Competing for the Oklahoma State Cowboys track and field team, McCubbins won the 1967 NCAA University Division Outdoor Track and Field Championships in the 3000 m steeplechase.

McCubbins died on August 21, 2009, after a six-month battle with leukemia.

Joe Mackintosh, the brother of Chris’ first wife Marie, wrote a biography of McCubbins published by J Gordon Shillingford Publishing Inc of Winnipeg Canada in 2013 titled ‘Chris McCubbins, Running The Distance.’
