= 1957 NCAA track and field championships =

1957 NCAA Track and Field Championships
- Team Champion: Villanova (1st title)
- Edition: 36th
- Dates: June 14−15, 1957
- Host city: Austin, Texas; University of Texas
- Venue: Memorial Stadium

The 1957 NCAA Track and Field Championships were contested June 14−15 at the 36th annual NCAA-sanctioned track meet to determine the individual and team national champions of men's collegiate track and field in the United States. This year's events were hosted by the University of Texas at Austin at Memorial Stadium in Austin.

Villanova captured the team national championship, the Wildcats' first title in program history.

== Team result ==
- Note: Top 10 finishers only
- (H) = Hosts

Rank	Team	Points
1st place, gold medalist(s)	Villanova	47
2nd place, silver medalist(s)	California	32
3rd place, bronze medalist(s)	Fresno State	23
4	Kansas	22 1/3
5	Stanford	21
6	Abilene Christian	20
7	North Carolina College; Occidental	16
8	Morgan State	15
9	Indiana; Manhattan	14
10	Texas (H)	13

== See also ==
- NCAA Men's Outdoor Track and Field Championship
- 1956 NCAA Men's Cross Country Championships
