= 600 yards at the NCAA Division I Indoor Track and Field Championships =

This is a list of the NCAA Division I indoor champions in the 600 yards or its metric equivalent 500 meters. The imperial distance was run until 1983, and the 500 meters was contested for only three years from 1984 to 1987 before the event was discontinued. The 1986 and 1987 races were reported to have been shorter than 500 meters, as the track was 25 inches (640 mm) per lap short in 1986. Hand timing was used until 1975 and in 1980, while starting in 1976 fully automatic timing was used.

== Winners ==
=== Women ===
Women's 500 meters winners
Year	Athlete	Team	Time
1983	Delisa Walton	Tennessee Volunteers	1:20.21 (Note: The 1983 race was supposed to be 600 yards (550 m), but ended up approximately 606 yards (554 m) long as runners were started from an incorrect stagger.)
1984	Cathy Rattray	Tennessee Volunteers	1:10.82
1985	Cynthia Green	Grambling State Tigers	1:10.46
1986	Ilrey Oliver	Tennessee Volunteers	1:09.68
1987	Linetta Wilson	Nebraska Cornhuskers	1:08.89

=== Men ===
==== 600 yards ====
Year	Name, (Country)	Team	Time
1965	Leland Albright	Louisiana St	1:10.0
1966	Martin McGrady	Central St OH	1:09.4
1967	Steve Carson	Iowa St	1:10.2
1968	Tom Albright	Colgate	1:10.6
1969	Bill Wehrwein	Michigan St	1:09.8
1970	Rick Wohlhuter	Notre Dame	1:09.5
1971	Tommie Turner	Murray St	1:09.6
1972	Dale Gibson	Mississippi St	1:11.3
1973	Beaufort Brown	Florida	1:10.0
1974	Stan Vinson	Eastern Mich	1:10.1
1975	Stan Vinson	Eastern Mich	1:10.2
1976	(Uganda) Charles Dramiga	New Mexico	1:10.58
1977	(Trinidad and Tobago) Mike Solomon	New Mexico	1:10.01
1978	Walter McCoy	Florida St	1:09.64
1979	Anthony Tufariello	Villanova	1:09.41
1980	Mike Ricks	Kansas	1:10.06
1981	Eugene Sanders	Mississippi Valley	1:09.84
1982	Eugene Sanders	Mississippi Valley	1:08.51
1983	Sunder Nix	Indiana	1:10.51

==== 500 meters ====
Year	Name, (Country)	Team	Time
1984	Robin Thomas	SE Missouri St	1:02.06
1985	Willie Caldwell	Baylor	1:01.24
1986	Roddie Haley	Arkansas	59.82
1987	Roddie Haley	Arkansas	59.90
