= 1965 NCAA indoor track and field championships =

1965 NCAA Indoor Track and Field Championships
- Dates: March 12-13, 1965
- Host city: Detroit, Michigan
- Venue: Cobo Arena

The 1965 NCAA Indoor Track and Field Championships were contested at the first annual NCAA-sanctioned track meet to determine the individual and team national champions of men's collegiate University Division indoor track and field events in the United States.

For the first time, the NCAA hosted a separate championship just for indoor track and field events. The original outdoor meet had previously been held annually since 1921. Unlike the outdoor championship, which was hosted later in the year during the spring, the indoor title was contested during the winter sports season.

The inaugural indoor meet was hosted at the Cobo Arena in Detroit, Michigan.

Missouri finished on top of the team standings and claimed the national title.

== Team result ==
- Note: Top 10 only

| Rank | Team | Points |
|---|---|---|
| 1st place, gold medalist(s) | Missouri | 14 |
| 2nd place, silver medalist(s) | Oklahoma State | 12 |
| 3rd place, bronze medalist(s) | Villanova | 11 |
| 4 | Maryland; Michigan State | 10 |
| 6 | USC | 9 |
| 7 | Kentucky State; Nebraska; Southern | 7 |
| 10 | Kansas; Notre Dame; Washington State | 6 |
