= 1968 NCAA indoor track and field championships =

1968 NCAA Indoor Track and Field Championships
- Dates: March 16, 1968
- Host city: Detroit, Michigan
- Venue: Cobo Arena

The 1968 NCAA Indoor Track and Field Championships were contested March 16, 1968, at the Cobo Arena in Detroit, Michigan at the fourth annual NCAA-sanctioned track meet to determine the individual and team national champions of men's collegiate indoor track and field events in the United States.

Villanova topped the team standings, finishing ten-and-a-third points ahead of defending champions USC. It was the Wildcats' first indoor team title.

== Qualification ==
Unlike other NCAA-sponsored sports, there were not separate University Division and College Division championships for indoor track and field until 1985. As such, all athletes and teams from University and College Division programs were eligible to compete.

== Team standings ==
- Note: Top 10 only
- ^{(DC)} = Defending Champions
- Full results

Rank	Team	Points
1st place, gold medalist(s)	Villanova	35 1/3
2nd place, silver medalist(s)	USC ^{(DC)}	25
3rd place, bronze medalist(s)	Oklahoma	17
4	Kansas	15 1/3
5	UTEP	15
6	Tennessee	12 1/3
7	Harvard	11
8	Washington State	10
9	Michigan State	8
10	Michigan; Oregon State	7
