= 1969 NCAA indoor track and field championships =

1969 NCAA Indoor Track and Field Championships
- Dates: March 14−15, 1969
- Host city: Detroit, Michigan
- Venue: Cobo Arena

The 1969 NCAA Indoor Track and Field Championships were contested March 14−15, 1969 at Cobo Arena in Detroit, Michigan at the fifth annual NCAA-sanctioned track meet to determine the individual and team national champions of men's collegiate indoor track and field events in the United States.

Kansas topped the team standings, finishing eight-and-a-half points ahead of defending champions Villanova; it was the Jayhawks' second indoor team title.

== Qualification ==
Unlike other NCAA-sponsored sports, there were not separate University Division and College Division championships for indoor track and field until 1985. As such, all athletes and teams from University and College Division programs were eligible to compete.

== Team standings ==
- Note: Top 10 only
- ^{(DC)} = Defending Champions
- Full results

Rank	Team	Points
1st place, gold medalist(s)	Kansas	35 1/3
2nd place, silver medalist(s)	Villanova ^{(DC)}	25
3rd place, bronze medalist(s)	San Jose State	17
4	USC; Tennessee	15 1/3
6	Nebraska	12 1/3
7	Harvard; Michigan State	11
9	BYU; Kansas State	8
