= Andrea Geubelle =

American track and field athlete (born 1991)

Andrea Norris
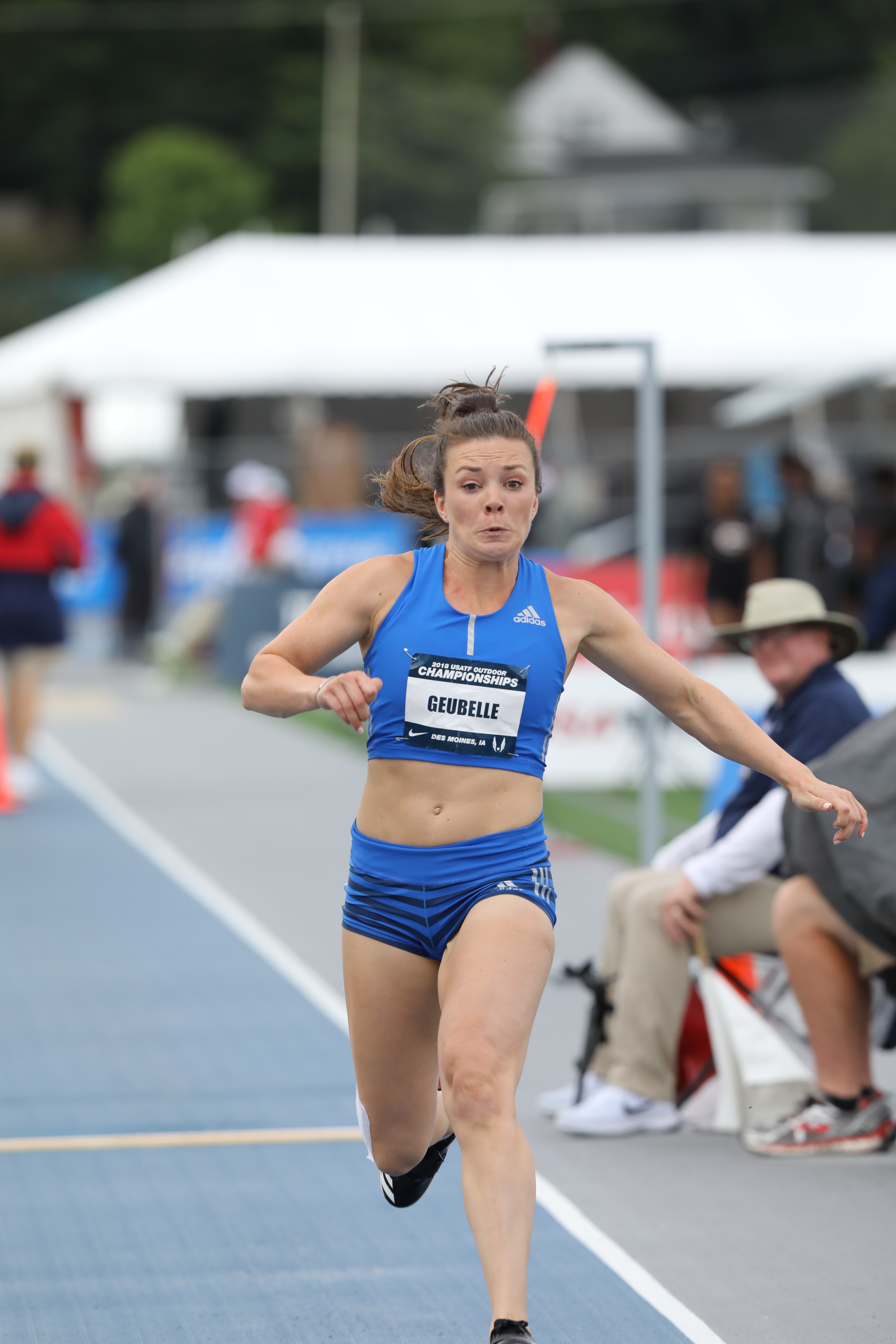
- Andrea Norris at the 2018 United States Track and Field Event.

Personal information
- Nationality: United States
- Born: June 26, 1991 (age 35) University Place, Washington
- Height: 5 ft 6 in (1.68 m)
- Spouse: Trey Norris
- Website: www.athletebiz.us/andrea-geubelle

Sport
- Sport: Track and Field
- Event: Triple jump
- College team: Kansas
- Turned pro: 2013
- Now coaching: Nate Wilford

Achievements and titles
- Personal best: Triple jump: 14.18 m (46 ft 6 1/4 in) Long jump: 6.70 m (21 ft 11 3/4 in) 100 meters: 11.67
Medal record
Women's athletics
Representing United States
NACAC Under-23 Championships
Gold medal – first place	2012 Irapuato, Mexico	Triple jump

Andrea Norris (née Geubelle; born June 26, 1991) is an American track and field athlete who competes in the long jump and triple jump. Norris won the American title in 2013. She has personal records of 6.70 m (21 ft 11 3/4 in) and 14.18 m (46 ft 6 1/4 in), respectively.

Norris is a University of Kansas alumna and is a three-time NCAA champion, having won the 2012 indoor triple jump title and a long jump/triple jump double at the 2013 NCAA Indoor Championship. In the triple jump, she also placed third at the 2012 United States Olympic Trials and was the gold medallist at the 2012 NACAC Under-23 Championships in Athletics.

== Early life ==
Raised in University Place, Washington, she attended Curtis Senior High School and competed in track and field while there. She won the long jump at the 2008 AAU Junior Olympic Games then won both long and triple jump events at the 2009 National High School Championships. She was also the state champion in the 100-meter dash that year.

== College career ==
Norris chose to study at the University of Kansas and began competing collegiately for the Kansas Jayhawks, being coached by Stanley Redwine. In her first major meet she came fifth in the long jump and third in the triple jump at the Big 12 Conference indoor championships. She failed to record a mark at the NCAA Indoor Championship. She was runner-up in both events at the Big 12 outdoor meet and also competed at the NCAA Outdoor Championship, where she was eighth in the long jump and eleventh in the triple jump. At the national junior championships she set a triple jump personal record of 13.29 m (43 ft 7 in) to win the title and came second in the long jump. At the 2010 World Junior Championships in Athletics, her first international competition, she failed to make the long jump final but came ninth in the triple jump.

Norris fared less well in her second year, her only top three Big 12 conference came in the long jump indoors. She placed eighth in the triple jump at the NCAA indoor and outdoor meets. She made her breakthrough in the triple jump at the start of the following season. She claimed the 2012 Big 12 indoor title with a jump of 13.59 m (44 ft 7 in) then won the NCAA Indoor Championship with a clearance of 13.67 m (44 ft 10 in). In the long jump, she also placed second at the Big 12 and eighth at the NCAA indoors.

At the beginning of the 2012 outdoor season she had a long jump best of 6.50 m (21 ft 3 3/4 in) then took the Big 12 triple jump outdoor title, as well as second in the long jump. She had a big personal record improvement at the NCAA outdoors, where her mark of 13.84 m (45 ft 4 3/4 in) took her to third place (she managed sixth in the long jump). She had appeared to be set to win the triple jump but a jump of 14.32 m (46 ft 11 3/4 in) was later disallowed. In good form, she tried for the Olympic team at the 2012 United States Olympic Trials. She finished third in the triple jump, but did not have the qualifying standard to gain selection. She had her first international medal at the 2012 NACAC Under-23 Championships in Athletics, winning the triple jump gold medal.

Her 2013 season began with a personal record jump of 6.69 m (21 ft 11 1/4 in) and at the Big 12 indoor meet she was runner-up in the long jump and retained her triple jump crown. The 2013 NCAA Indoor Championship saw her claim a horizontal jump double, as she took both the long and triple jump titles and set a personal record of 14.18 m (46 ft 6 1/4 in). She repeated her previous Big 12 Outdoor placings (first in triple jump, second in long jump) then set a triple jump outdoor best of 13.85 m (45 ft 5 1/4 in). She entered as one of the favourites at the NCAA Outdoor Championships but left as runner-up in both the long jump and triple jump. However, these performances helped the Kansas Jayhawks win their first ever NCAA women's title. Despite her failure to win the outdoor collegiate title she went on to take her first national title at the 2013 USA Outdoor Track and Field Championships with a wind-assisted jump of 14.03 m (46 ft 1/4 in).

== Professional ==
Her 2014 season will begin at 2014 USA Indoor Track and Field Championships between February 20 - 22nd in Albuquerque, New Mexico with the long jump and triple jump. Norris jumped 6.61m (21-08.25 feet) to place 3rd and 13.66m (44-09.75 feet) to place 2nd.

Andrea finished 13th in the long jump with a 6.32 m (20 ft 8 3/4 in) at 2015 USA Outdoor Track and Field Championships. Andrea finished 1st in the triple jump with a 13.97 m (45 ft 10 in) at University of Oregon Ducks twilight on May 6, 2016. video of Andrea Guebelle's (@ageubelle05 )14.15 m (46 ft 5 in) jump in the 4th round jump out here at the Chula Vista Elite meet - 6:12 PM - 19 Jun 2016 U.S. Olympic Training Center - Chula Vista

Norris, alongside Keturah Orji and Christina Epps, achieved the 2016 Olympic Standard at 2016 United States Olympic Trials and was selected for the United States Olympic team. Norris placed 21st at the 2016 Olympic triple jump, jumping 13.93 m (45 ft 8 1/4 in).

Norris finished fifth in triple jump at 2017 USA Indoor Track and Field Championships and third in the triple jump with a 13.62 m (44 ft 8 in) at 2017 USA Outdoor Track and Field Championships. Andrea Norris placed sixth in triple jump at 2020 USA Indoor Track and Field Championships.

== International competitions ==
Representing the United States
Year	Competition	Venue	Position	Event	Result	Notes
2012	NACAC U23 Championships	Irapuato, Mexico	1st	Triple jump	13.14 m (43 ft 1 in)	
2016	Olympic Games	Rio de Janeiro, Brazil	21st	Triple jump	13.93 m (45 ft 8 in)	

== National competitions ==
Year	Competition	Venue	Position	Event	Result	Notes
2012	Olympic Trials	Eugene, Oregon	11th	Long jump	6.29 m (20 ft 8 in)	
2012	Olympic Trials	Eugene, Oregon	3rd	Triple jump	13.79 m (45 ft 3 in)	
2013	USA Outdoor Track and Field Championships	Des Moines, Iowa	7th	Long jump	6.37 m (20 ft 11 in)	
2013	USA Outdoor Track and Field Championships	Des Moines, Iowa	1st	Triple jump	14.03 m (46 ft 0 in)	
2014	USA Indoor Track and Field Championships	Albuquerque, New Mexico	3rd	Long jump	6.61 m (21 ft 8 in)	
2014	USA Indoor Track and Field Championships	Albuquerque, New Mexico	2nd	Triple jump	13.66 m (44 ft 9 3/4 in)	
2014	USA Outdoor Track and Field Championships	Sacramento, California	9th	Long jump	6.23 m (20 ft 5 in)	
2014	USA Outdoor Track and Field Championships	Sacramento, California	5th	Triple jump	13.46 m (44 ft 2 in)	
2015	USA Outdoor Track and Field Championships	Eugene, Oregon	13th	Long jump	6.32 m (20 ft 9 in)	
2016	Olympic Trials	Eugene, Oregon	3rd	Triple jump	13.95 m (45 ft 9 in)	
2016	USA Indoor Track and Field Championships	Portland, Oregon	3rd	Long jump	6.57 m (21 ft 7 in)	
2017	USA Outdoor Track and Field Championships	Sacramento, California	3rd	Triple jump	13.62 m (44 ft 8 in)	
2017	USA Indoor Track and Field Championships	Albuquerque, New Mexico	5th	Triple jump	13.18 m (43 ft 3 in)	
2018	USA Indoor Track and Field Championships	Albuquerque, New Mexico	2nd	Triple jump	13.78 m (45 ft 3 in)	
2020	USA Indoor Track and Field Championships	Albuquerque, New Mexico	6th	Triple jump	13.10 m (43 ft 0 in)	

== Personal records ==
Outdoor

- Long jump – 6.70 m (21 ft 11 3/4 in) (2015)
- Triple jump – 14.17 m (46 ft 5 3/4 in) (2012)
- 100-meter dash – 11.81 sec (2009)
- 400-meter dash – 55.45 sec (2013)

Indoor

- Long jump – 6.69 m (21 ft 11 1/4 in) (2013)
- Triple jump – 14.18 m (46 ft 6 1/4 in) (2013)
