= 1970 NCAA Indoor Track and Field Championships =

- Dates: March 13−14, 1970
- Host city: Detroit, Michigan
- Venue: Cobo Arena

The 1970 NCAA Indoor Track and Field Championships were contested March 13−14, 1970 at Cobo Arena in Detroit, Michigan at the sixth annual NCAA-sanctioned track meet to determine the individual and team national champions of men's collegiate indoor track and field events in the United States.

Kansas topped the team standings, finishing only 1.5 points ahead of Villanova; it was the Jayhawks' second consecutive and third overall indoor team title.

Kansas University's victory over Villanova was dominated by their three weight men, Karl Salb, Steve Wilhelm and Doug Knop, who placed one-two-three in the 16-pound shot put with all three athletes breaking 60 feet. This was the second year in a row that the same athletic trio placed one-two-three at the NCAA Indoor Track and Field Championships.

In addition, the Kansas 2-mile relay team consisting of (in order of their relay position) Dennis Stewart, Jim Neihouse, Roger Kathol, and Brian McElroy, won first place and beat favored Kansas State by over 10 yards as they set a new indoor world record at 7:25.7. Brian anchored with a great time of under 1:50 on the small 11-laps to the mile track.

== Qualification ==
Unlike other NCAA-sponsored sports, there were not separate University Division and College Division championships for indoor track and field until 1985. As such, all athletes and teams from University and College Division programs were eligible to compete.

== Team standings ==
- Note: Top 10 only
- ^{(DC)} = Defending Champions
- Full results

Rank	Team	Points
1st place, gold medalist(s)	Kansas ^{(DC)}	27 1/2
2nd place, silver medalist(s)	Villanova	26
3rd place, bronze medalist(s)	Harvard	15
4	BYU	14 1/2
5	Tennessee; Wisconsin	14
7	Michigan State	12
8	Nebraska	10
9	Indiana; Maryland	8
