= 2012 NCAA Division I Indoor Track and Field Championships =

- Dates: March 9-10, 2012
- Host city: (Idaho) Nampa, Idaho; Boise State University
- Venue: Ford Idaho Center
- Events: 32

The 2012 NCAA Division I Indoor Track and Field Championships was the 47th NCAA Men's Division I Indoor Track and Field Championships and the 30th NCAA Women's Division I Indoor Track and Field Championships, held at the Ford Idaho Center in Nampa, Idaho near the campus of the host school, Boise State University. In total, thirty-two different men's and women's indoor track and field events were contested from March 9 to March 10, 2012.

At the championships, the Florida Gators track and field and Oregon Ducks track and field programs each won their third consecutive team title.

== Team scores ==
- Note: Top 3 only
- Scoring: 10 points for a 1st-place finish in an event, 8 points for 2nd, 6 points for 3rd, 5 points for 4th, 4 points for 5th, 3 points for 6th, 2 points for 7th, and 1 point for 8th.

=== Men's teams ===
Pl.	Team	Points
1	Florida	52
2	Arkansas	47
3	Arizona	41

=== Women's teams ===
Pl.	Team	Points
1	Oregon	49
2	Kansas	30
3	Louisiana State	27

== Results ==
=== Men ===
==== 60 meters ====
Rank	Athlete	Team	Time	Notes
1st place, gold medalist(s)	Jeff Demps	Florida	6.56	

==== 200 meters ====
Rank	Athlete	Team	Time	Notes
1st place, gold medalist(s)	Ameer Webb	Texas A&M	20.57	

==== 400 meters ====
Rank	Athlete	Team	Time	Notes
1st place, gold medalist(s)	Tony McQuay	Florida	45.77	

==== 800 meters ====
Rank	Athlete	Team	Time	Notes
1st place, gold medalist(s)	Mason McHenry	Arizona State	1:47.96	

==== Mile run ====
Rank	Athlete	Team	Time	Notes
1st place, gold medalist(s)	Chris O'Hare	Tulsa	4:01.66	

==== 3000 meters ====
Rank	Athlete	Team	Time	Notes
1st place, gold medalist(s)	Lawi Lalang	Arizona	7:46.64	

==== 5000 meters ====
Rank	Athlete	Team	Time	Notes
1st place, gold medalist(s)	Lawi Lalang	Arizona	13:25.11	

==== 60 meter hurdles ====
Rank	Athlete	Team	Time	Notes
1st place, gold medalist(s)	Jarret Eaton	Syracuse	7.54	

==== 4 × 400 meter relay ====
Rank	Athletes	Team	Time	Notes
1st place, gold medalist(s)	Marek Niit; Akheem Gauntlett; Ben Skidmore; Neil Braddy	Arkansas	3:04.92	

==== Distance medley relay ====
Rank	Athletes	Team	Time	Notes
1st place, gold medalist(s)	Johnathan Shawel; Christopher Giesting; Randall Babb; Jeremy Rae	Notre Dame	9:35.48	

==== High jump ====
Rank	Athlete	Team	Mark	Notes
1st place, gold medalist(s)	Nick Ross	Arizona	2.23 m	

==== Pole vault ====
Rank	Athlete	Team	Mark	Notes
1st place, gold medalist(s)	Andrew Irwin	Arkansas	5.55 m	

==== Long jump ====
Rank	Athlete	Team	Mark	Notes
1st place, gold medalist(s)	Kendall Spencer	New Mexico	8.01 m	

==== Triple jump ====
Rank	Athlete	Team	Mark	Notes
1st place, gold medalist(s)	Omar Craddock	Florida	16.75 m	

==== Shot put ====
Rank	Athlete	Team	Mark	Notes
1st place, gold medalist(s)	Jordan Clarke	Arizona State	20.86 m	

==== Weight throw ====
Rank	Athlete	Team	Mark	Notes
1st place, gold medalist(s)	Marcel Lomnicky	Virginia Tech	22.04 m	

==== Heptathlon ====
Rank	Athlete	Team	Mark	Notes
1st place, gold medalist(s)	Curtis Beach	Duke	6138 pts	

=== Women ===
==== 60 meters ====
Rank	Athlete	Team	Time	Notes
1st place, gold medalist(s)	English Gardner	Oregon	7.12	

==== 200 meters ====
Rank	Athlete	Team	Time	Notes
1st place, gold medalist(s)	Kimberlyn Duncan	Louisiana State	22.74	

==== 400 meters ====
Rank	Athlete	Team	Time	Notes
1st place, gold medalist(s)	Diamond Dixon	Kansas	51.78	

==== 800 meters ====
Rank	Athlete	Team	Time	Notes
1st place, gold medalist(s)	Nachelle Mackie	Brigham Young	2:03.30	

==== Mile run ====
Rank	Athlete	Team	Time	Notes
1st place, gold medalist(s)	Lucy Van Dalen	Stony Brook	4:39.76	

==== 3000 meters ====
Rank	Athlete	Team	Time	Notes
1st place, gold medalist(s)	Emily Infeld	Georgetown	9:15.44	

==== 5000 meters ====
Rank	Athlete	Team	Time	Notes
1st place, gold medalist(s)	Betsy Saina	Iowa State	15:38.83	

==== 60 meter hurdles ====
Rank	Athlete	Team	Time	Notes
1st place, gold medalist(s)	Christina Manning	Ohio State	7.91	

==== 4 × 400 meter relay ====
Rank	Athletes	Team	Time	Notes
1st place, gold medalist(s)	Rebecca Alexander; Cassandra Tate; Siedda Herbert; Jonique Day	Louisiana State	3:31.89	

==== Distance medley relay ====
Rank	Athletes	Team	Time	Notes
1st place, gold medalist(s)	Chelsea Orr; Jordan Carlson; Baylee Mires; Katie Flood	Washington	11:05.2	

==== High jump ====
Rank	Athlete	Team	Mark	Notes
1st place, gold medalist(s)	Brigetta Barrett	Arizona	1.96 m	

==== Pole vault ====
Rank	Athlete	Team	Mark	Notes
1st place, gold medalist(s)	Tina Sutej	Arkansas	4.45 m	

==== Long jump ====
Rank	Athlete	Team	Mark	Notes
1st place, gold medalist(s)	Whitney Gipson	Texas Christian	6.91 m	

==== Triple jump ====
Rank	Athlete	Team	Mark	Notes
1st place, gold medalist(s)	Kimberly Williams	Florida State	13.67 m	

==== Shot put ====
Rank	Athlete	Team	Mark	Notes
1st place, gold medalist(s)	Tia Brooks	Oklahoma	19.00 m	

==== Weight throw ====
Rank	Athlete	Team	Mark	Notes
1st place, gold medalist(s)	Jeneva McCall	Southern Illinois	22.90 m	

==== Pentathlon ====
Rank	Athlete	Team	Mark	Notes
1st place, gold medalist(s)	Brianne Theisen	Oregon	4536 pts	

== See also ==
- NCAA Men's Division I Indoor Track and Field Championships
- NCAA Women's Division I Indoor Track and Field Championships
