= Karl Salb =

American shot putter (born 1949)

Karl Salb (born May 19, 1949) is an American retired shot putter. Competing for the University of Kansas he won six successive NCAA Championships, three each Indoors and Outdoors. No other athlete has won more than four. Additionally, he finished fourth at the Olympic Trials in 1968 and sixth in 1972.

He was also the 1971 United States champion.

In an era when there was no money to be made in amateur track and field, Salb was drafted by the Buffalo Bills in the 14th round of the 1972 NFL draft. The married "Gentle Giant" chose not to pursue the sport and remain an amateur.

While competing for Crossett High School in 1967, Salb set the National High School Record for the shot put at 69' 7"

Salb was inducted into the USTFCCCA Collegiate Athlete Hall of Fame in 2024.
