= 1956 NCAA track and field championships =

1956 NCAA Track and Field Championships
- Team Champion: UCLA (1st title)
- Edition: 35th
- Dates: June 15-16, 1956
- Host city: Berkeley, California; University of California, Berkeley
- Venue: Edwards Stadium

The 1956 NCAA Track and Field Championships were held in Berkeley, California in June 1956. UCLA won the team title, ending a seven-year streak by the University of Southern California. Nine NCAA meet records and one American record were broken at the event.

Bobby Morrow of Abilene Christian led all athletes with 20 points in the meet. Morrow won both the 100-meter and 200-meter dashes. Morrow went on to win three gold medals in the 1956 Summer Olympics.

Rafer Johnson led the scoring for team champion UCLA. Johnson scored 16 of UCLA's 55-7/10 points with second-place finishes in the broad jump and high hurdles. Johnson went on to win the gold medal in the decathlon at the 1960 Summer Olympics.

The one American record that was broken at the meet was in the 800-meter run. Arnie Sowell of the University of Pittsburgh set the new American mark with a time of 1:46.7.

== Team scoring ==
1. UCLA – 55-7/10
2. Kansas - 50
3. University of Southern California – 34 1/2
4. Michigan State – 29
5. Abilene Christian – 25
6. Villanova – 24
7. Oregon – 20
8. Michigan – 19-7/10
9. Oklahoma A&M – 19
10. Manhattan - 17

== Track events ==
100-meter dash
1. Bobby Morrow, Abilene Christian – 10.4
2. Dave Sime, Duke – 10.6
3. Agostini, Fresno State – 10.6

110-meter high hurdles
1. Lee Calhoun, North Carolina College – 13.7
2. Rafer Johnson, UCLA – 13.8
3. Looween, Mankato State – 14.0

200-meter dash
1. Bobby Morrow, Abilene Christian – 20.6
2. Blair, Kansas – 21.0
3. Bobby Whilden, Texas – 21.2

400-meter dash
1. Jesse Mashburn, Oklahoma A&M – 46.4
2. Haines, Penn – 46.6
2. Jenkins, Villanova – 46.6
2. Ellis, Russ UCLA – 46.6

400-meter hurdles
1. Lewis, Notre Dame – 51.0
2. Glenn Davis, Ohio State – 51.4
3. Thompson, Rice – 51.8

800-meter run
1. Arnie Sowell, Pittsburgh – 1:46.7
2. Stanley, San Jose State – 1:49.2
3. Brew, Dartmouth – 1:50.5
3. Johnson, Abilene Christian – 1:50.5

1,500-meter run
1. Ron Delany, Villnova – 3:47.3
2. Bailey, Oregon – 3:47.4
3. Sid Wing, Univ. South. Calif. – 3:49.7

3,000-meter steeplechase
1. Kennedy, Michigan State – 9:16.5
2. Matza, BYU – 9:17.2
3. Kielstrup, Michigan – 9:34.4

5,000-meter run
1. Bill Dellinger, Oregon – 14:48.5
2. Jim Beatty, North Carolina – 14:51.1
3. Jones, Michigan State – 14:52.2

== Field events ==
Broad jump
1. Bell, Indiana – 25 feet 4 inches (7.72 m)
2. Rafer Johnson, UCLA - 25 feet 4 inches (7.72 m)
3. Floerke, Kansas – 24 feet 5 inches (7.44 m)

High jump
1. Reavis, Villanova – 6 feet 8 1/4 inches (2.038 m)
1. Lang, Missouri – 6 feet 8 1/4 inches (2.038 m)
1. Dyer, UCLA – 6 feet 8 1/4 inches (2.038 m)

Pole vault
1. Bob Gutowski, Occidental – 14 feet 8 inches (4.47 m)
1. Graham, Oklahoma A&M – 14 feet 8 inches (4.47 m)
3. Levack, Univ. South. Calif. – 14 feet 4 inches (4.37 m)
3. Landstrom, Michigan – 14 feet 4 inches (4.37 m)

Discus throw
1. Drummond, UCLA – 173 feet 1/2 inch (52.743 m)
2. Vick, UCLA – 171 feet 5 inches (52.25 m)
3. Rink Babka, Univ. South. Calif. – 170 feet 9 1/2 inches (52.057 m)

Javelin
1. Conley, Cal Tech – 239 feet 11 inches (73.13 m)
2. Maijala, Univ. South. Calif. – 229 feet 10 inches (70.05 m)
3. Bitner, Kansas – 223 feet 11 1/2 inches (68.263 m)

Shot put
1. Bantum, Manhattan – 60 feet 1/2 inch (18.301 m)
2. Bill Nieder, Kansas – 57 feet 3 1/8 inches (17.453 m)
3. Owen, Michigan – 57 feet 2/3 inch (17.391 m)

Hammer throw
1. McWilliams, Bowdoin – 195 feet 3 inches (59.51 m) (new NCAA meet record)
2. Hall, Cornell – 193 feet 8 1/2 inches (59.042 m)
3. Morefield, MIT – 193 feet 2 inches (58.88 m)

Hop, step and jump
1. Sharp, West Chester St. – 50 feet 4 3/4 inches (15.361 m)
2. Floerke, Kansas – 49 feet 6 1/4 inches (15.094 m)
3. Davis, LaSalle – 49 feet 3 1/4 inches (15.018 m)

== See also ==
- Athletics at the 1956 Summer Olympics
- NCAA Men's Outdoor Track and Field Championship
