= 1966 NCAA indoor track and field championships =

1966 NCAA Indoor Track and Field Championships
- Dates: March 11−12, 1966
- Host city: Detroit, Michigan
- Venue: Cobo Arena
- Events: 15

The 1966 NCAA Indoor Track and Field Championships were contested March 11−12, 1966 at the Cobo Arena in Detroit, Michigan at the second annual NCAA-sanctioned track meet to determine the individual and team national champions of men's collegiate University Division indoor track and field events in the United States.

Kansas topped the team standings, finishing one point ahead of USC. It was the Jayhawks' first title in program history.

== Qualification ==
Unlike other NCAA-sponsored sports, there were not separate University Division and College Division championships for indoor track and field until 1985. As such, all athletes and teams from University and College Division programs were eligible to compete.

== Team standings ==
- Note: Top 10 only

Rank	Team	Points
1st place, gold medalist(s)	Kansas	14
2nd place, silver medalist(s)	USC	13
3rd place, bronze medalist(s)	Central State (OH); Nebraska	12
5	Kansas State; Oklahoma	9 1/2
7	Morgan State; Villanova	9
9	Georgetown; Washington State	8
