= 1971 NCAA Indoor Track and Field Championships =

- Dates: March 12−13, 1971
- Host city: Detroit, Michigan
- Venue: Cobo Arena

The 1971 NCAA Indoor Track and Field Championships were contested March 12−13, 1971 at Cobo Arena in Detroit, Michigan at the seventh annual NCAA-sanctioned track meet to determine the individual and team national champions of men's collegiate indoor track and field events in the United States.

Villanova topped the team standings, finishing only 2.75 points ahead of Texas–El Paso; it was the Wildcats' second overall indoor team title.

== Qualification ==
Unlike other NCAA-sponsored sports, there were not separate University Division and College Division championships for indoor track and field until 1985. As such, all athletes and teams from University and College Division programs were eligible to compete.

== Team standings ==
- Note: Top 10 only
- ^{(DC)} = Defending Champions
- Full results

Rank	Team	Points
1st place, gold medalist(s)	Villanova	22
2nd place, silver medalist(s)	UTEP	19 1/4
3rd place, bronze medalist(s)	Wisconsin	15
4	Colorado; Kansas ^{(DC)}	12
6	Adelphi	11
7	Kent State	10
8	Michigan State; Pittsburgh	9
10	Tennessee	8 1/4
