= 1965 NCAA University Division outdoor track and field championships =

1965 NCAA University Division Outdoor Track and Field Championships
- Team Champions: Oregon (3rd title) & USC (23rd title)
- Edition: 44th
- Dates: June 17−19, 1965
- Host city: Berkeley, California
- Venue: Edwards Stadium; University of California

The 1965 NCAA University Division Outdoor Track and Field Championships were contested June 17−19 at the 44th annual NCAA-sanctioned track meet to determine the individual and team national champions of men's collegiate University Division outdoor track and field events in the United States.

For the first time, the NCAA hosted a separate championship just for indoor track and field events. The inaugural event was contested at Cobo Arena in Detroit, Michigan and won by Missouri. Unlike the outdoor event in June, the indoor championship was contested during the NCAA's winter sports season.

This year's outdoor meet was hosted by the University of California at Edwards Stadium in Berkeley.

Oregon and USC finished tied in the team standings and were declared co-national champions; it was the Ducks' third title and the Trojans' twenty-third.

== Team Result ==
- Note: Top 10 only
- (H) = Hosts

Rank	Team	Points
1st place, gold medalist(s)	Oregon; USC	32
2nd place, silver medalist(s)	BYU	27
3rd place, bronze medalist(s)	California (H)	25 1/2
4	New Mexico	25
5	Nebraska	24
6	Washington State	23 1/2
7	Montana; San José State; St. John's (NY); UCLA	20
8	Oregon State; Villanova	18
9	Arizona; Occidental	16
10	Abilene Christian; Arizona State; Kansas; North Carolina College; Northeastern	14
