= 1967 NCAA indoor track and field championships =

1967 NCAA Indoor Track and Field Championships
- Dates: March 10−11, 1967
- Host city: Detroit, Michigan
- Venue: Cobo Arena

The 1967 NCAA Indoor Track and Field Championships were contested March 10−11, 1967 at the Cobo Arena in Detroit, Michigan at the third annual NCAA-sanctioned track meet to determine the individual and team national champions of men's collegiate indoor track and field events in the United States.

USC topped the team standings, finishing nine points ahead of Oklahoma. It was the Trojans' first indoor team title.

== Qualification ==
Unlike other NCAA-sponsored sports, there were not separate University Divisions.

== Team standings ==
- Note: Top 10 only
- Full results

Rank	Team	Points
1st place, gold medalist(s)	USC	26
2nd place, silver medalist(s)	Oklahoma	17
3rd place, bronze medalist(s)	Kansas	16
4	Villanova	15
5	New Mexico; Wisconsin	12
7	Missouri	9
8	Connecticut; Michigan	8
10	Miami (OH)	7
