= 1960 NCAA track and field championships =

1960 NCAA Track and Field Championships
- Team Champion: Kansas (2nd title)
- Edition: 39th
- Dates: June 17-18, 1960
- Host city: Berkeley, CA; University of California, Berkeley
- Venue: Edwards Stadium
- Events: 18

The 1960 NCAA Track and Field Championships were held in Berkeley, California in June 1960. The University of Kansas won the team title for the second consecutive year. Ten NCAA meet records were broken, and one was tied.

== NCAA meet records ==
- Charlie Tidwell of the University of Kansas won the 100-meter and 200-meter dashes and set a new NCAA meet record of 10.2 in the 100-meter race.
- In the high jump, John Thomas of Boston University set a new NCAA meet record at 7 feet and made three attempts at the world record height of 7 feet, 2 inches. He was unable to clear the bar in all three attempts. Thomas went on to win the bronze medal in the event at the 1960 Summer Olympics in Rome and the silver medal in the 1964 Olympics.
- In the 1,500-meter race, Dyrol Burleson of the University of Oregon set a new NCAA meet record at 3:44.2. At the time, Burleson was one of only four Americans to break the four-minute mark in the 1,500-meter race. That same year, Burleson set the American record in the 1,500-meter race with at time of 3:40.9. He placed 6th at the 1960 Summer Olympics in Rome.
- In the 3,000-meter steeplechase, Charlie Clark of San Jose State finished with a time of 9:02.1 – 14 seconds ahead of the NCAA meet record.

== Team scoring ==
1. Kansas - 50
2. University of Southern California - 37
3. UCLA - 31
4. Oregon - 22
4. Oregon State – 22
6. Boston University – 20
6. Houston – 20
6. San Jose State – 20
9. Illinois – 18
10. Arizona – 16
10. Grambling - 16

== Track events ==
100-meter dash
1. Charlie Tidwell, Kansas – 10.2 (ties NCAA meet record)
2. Paul Winder, Morgan State – 10.3
3. Larry Dunn, Arizona – 10.6

110-meter high hurdles
1. Jim Johnson, UCLA – 14.0
2. Dave Odegard, Minnesota – 14.0
3.Dave Edstrom, Oregon – 14.2

200-meter dash
1. Charlie Tidwell, Kansas – 20.8
2. Stone Johnson, Grambling – 21.1
3. Paul Winder, Morgan State – 21.2

400-meter dash
1. Ted Woods, Colorado – 45.7 (new NCAA meet record)
2. Vic Hall, Cal Poly – 46.1
3. Walt Johnson, North Carolina College – 46.3

400-meter hurdles
1. Cliff Cushman, Kansas – 50.8
2. Ron Ablowich, Georgia Tech – 51.7
3. Ray Wilson, Texas – 52.2

800-meter run
1. George Kerr, Illinois – 1:46.1 (new NCAA meet record)
2. Jerry Siebert, California – 1:46.9
3. Ernie Cunliffe, Stanford – 1:47.6

1,500-meter run
1. Dyrol Burleson, Oregon – 3:44.2 (new NCAA meet record)
2. Bob Holland, UCLA – 3:47.5
3. Mildford Dahl, UCLA – 3:47.9

3,000-meter steeplechase
1. Charlie Clark, San Jose State – 9:02.1
2. Steve Moorehead, Penn State – 9:16.6
3. Mauri Jorinakka, Eastern Michigan – 9:18.7

5,000-meter run
1. Al Lawrence, Houston – 14:19.8 (new NCAA meet record)
2. Pat Clohessy, Houston – (no time)
3. Ken Brown, Illinois – 14:43.0

== Field events ==
Broad jump
1. Ralph Boston, Tennessee A&I – 25 feet, 5¾ inches
2. Henk Visser, Univ. Calif., Santa Barbara – 25 feet, 5½ inches
3. Darrell Horn, Oregon – 25 feet

High jump
1. John Thomas, Boston University – 7 feet (new NCAA meet record)
2. Charles Lewis, Grambling – 6 feet, 9 inches
3. Charles Dumas, Univ. South. Calif. – 6 feet, 8 inches
3. Errol Williams, San Jose State – 6 feet, 8 inches

Pole vault
1. J.D. Martin, Oklahoma – 14 feet, 9 inches
2. Aubrey Dooley, Oklahoma State – 14 feet, 6 inches
2. Dick Kimmel, San Jose State – 14 feet, 6 inches
2. Wayne Wilson, Washington State – 14 feet, 6 inches
2. Henry Wadsworth, Florida – 14 feet, 6 inches
2. Jim Brewer, Univ. South. Calif. – 14 feet, 6 inches
2. Dexter Elkins, SMU – 14 feet, 6 inches
2. Dave Clark, North Texas State – 14 feet, 6 inches

Discus throw
1. Dick Cochran, Missouri – 188 feet, 3½ inches
2. Jim Wade, Univ. South. Calif. – 176 feet, 3½ inches
3. Jim Burke, Arizona – 172 feet, 2 inches

Javelin
1. Bill Alley, Kansas – 268 feet, 9 inches (new NCAA meet record)
2. Gary Stenlund, Oregon State – 246 feet, 3 inches
3. Terry Beucher, Kansas – 245 feet, 7 inches

Shot put
1. Dallas Long, Univ. of Southern Calif. – 61 feet, 9 inches (new NCAA meet record)
2. Jerry Winter, Stanford – 57 feet, 10¾ inches
3. Mike Lewis, Occidental College – 57 feet, 6½ inches

Hammer throw
1. John Lawlor, Boston University – 209 feet, 2 inches (new NCAA meet record)
2. Stan Doten, Harvard – 197 feet, 8½ inches
3. Dave Cross, Yale – 185 feet, 7 inches

Hop, step and jump
1. Luther Hayes, Univ. South. Calif. – 50 feet, 11½ inches
2. Darrell Horn, Oregon State – 48 feet, 7½ inches
3. John Kelly, Stanford – 48 feet, 5¼ inches

== See also ==
- Athletics at the 1960 Summer Olympics
- NCAA Men's Outdoor Track and Field Championship
