= 2011 NCAA Division I Outdoor Track and Field Championships =

- Edition: 90th (Men); 30th (Women)
- Dates: June 8–11, 2011
- Host city: (Iowa) Des Moines, Iowa; Drake University
- Venue: Drake Stadium

The 2011 NCAA Division I Outdoor Track and Field Championships were contested at the 90th annual NCAA-sanctioned track meet to determine the individual and team champions of men's and women's Division I collegiate outdoor track and field in the United States.

This year's meet, the 30th with both men's and women's championships, was held June 8–11, 2011 at Drake Stadium at Drake University in Des Moines, Iowa.

Two-time defending champions for both men and women, Texas A&M again won both titles, the Aggies' third title at each of their respective championships.

== Team results ==
- Note: Top 10 only
- (DC) = Defending champions
- Full results

=== Men's standings ===
Rank	Team	Points
1st place, gold medalist(s)	Texas A&M (DC)	55
2nd place, silver medalist(s)	Florida State	54
3rd place, bronze medalist(s)	Florida	53
4	LSU	46
5	Virginia Tech	36
6	Stanford	29
7	Arizona	28
8	BYU	27.5
9	Texas Tech	26
10	Arkansas; Oregon	25

=== Women's standings ===
Rank	Team	Points
1st place, gold medalist(s)	Texas A&M (DC)	49
2nd place, silver medalist(s)	Oregon	45
3rd place, bronze medalist(s)	LSU	43.5
4	Oklahoma	42
5	Arizona	35
6	USC	30
7	Clemson	28
8	Stanford; Texas	25
10	Southern Miss	21
