= 3000 meter steeplechase at the NCAA Division I Outdoor Track and Field Championships =

This is a list of NCAA outdoor champions in the 3000 meters steeplechase. Hand timing was used until 1973, while starting in 1974 fully automatic timing was used. The women's event was introduced in 2001.

== Women ==
Key
A=Altitude assisted

Year	Name	Nationality	Team	Time
2001	Elizabeth Jackson	United States	Brigham Young	9:49.73
2002	Michaela Mannová	Czech Republic	Brigham Young	9:45.94
2003	Kassi Anderson	United States	Brigham Young	9:44.95
2004	Ida Nilsson	Sweden	Northern Ariz	9:48.29
2005	Victoria Mitchell	Australia	Butler	9:54.32
2006	Jenny Barringer	United States	Colorado	9:53.04
2007	Anna Willard	United States	Michigan	9:35.08
2008	Jenny Barringer	United States	Colorado	9:29.20
2009	Jenny Barringer	United States	Colorado	9:25.54
2010	Bridget Franek	United States	Penn State	9:38.86
2011	Emma Coburn	United States	Colorado	9:41.14
2012	Shalaya Kipp	United States	Colorado	9:49.02
2013	Emma Coburn	United States	Colorado	9:35.38
2014	Leah O'Connor	United States	Michigan State	9:36.43
2015	Colleen Quigley	United States	Florida State	9:29.32
2016	Courtney Frerichs	United States	New Mexico	9:24.41
2017	Allie Ostrander	United States	Boise State	9:41.31
2018	Allie Ostrander	United States	Boise State	9:39.28
2019	Allie Ostrander	United States	Boise State	9:37.73
2021	Mahala Norris	United States	Air Force	9:31.79
2022	Courtney Wayment	United States	Brigham Young	9:16:00
2023	Olivia Markezich	United States	Notre Dame	9:25.03
2024	Doris Lemngole	Kenya	Alabama	9:15.24
2025	Doris Lemngole	Kenya	Alabama	8:58.15
2025	Taylor Lovell	United States	BYU	9:21.03

== Men ==
Key
y=yards
A=Altitude affected

Year	Name, (Country)	Team	Time
1948	Browning Ross	Villanova	09:25.7
1949			
1950			
1951			
1952	Bob McMullen	San Jose St	09:31.2
1953	Patrick Wagner	Notre Dame	
1954	Patrick Wagner	Notre Dame	
1955	Patrick Wagner	Notre Dame	
1956	Henry Kennedy	Michigan St	09:16.5
1957	not held		
1958	not held		
1959	John Macy Poland (born: Jan Miecznikowski)	Houston	09:19.1
1960	Charley Clark	San Jose St	09:02.1
1961	John Lawler Australia	Abilene Christian	09:01.1
1962	Pat Traynor	Villanova	08:48.6
1963	Vic Zwolak	Villanova	9:10.1A
1964	Vic Zwolak	Villanova	08:42.0
1965	Bruce Mortenson	Oregon	09:00.8
1966	Bob Richards	Brigham Young	08:51.6
1967	Chris McCubbins	Oklahoma St	8:51.4A
1968	Kerry Pearce	UTEP	08:50.8
1969	Jim Barkley	Oregon St	08:44.4
1970	Sidney Sink	Bowling Green	08:40.9
1971	Sidney Sink	Bowling Green	08:30.9
1972	Joe Lucas	Georgetown	08:30.1
1973	Doug Brown	Tennessee	08:28.1
1974	Doug Brown	Tennessee	08:35.9
1975	James Munyala Kenya	UTEP	8:47.93A
1976	James Munyala Kenya	UTEP	08:24.9
1977	James Munyala Kenya	UTEP	08:29.5
1978	Henry Rono Kenya	Wash St	08:12.4
1979	Henry Rono Kenya	Wash St	08:17.9
1980	Randy Jackson	Wisconsin	08:22.8
1981	Solomon Chebor Kenya	FDU-Teaneck	08:23.3
1982	Richard Tuwei Kenya	Wash St	8:42.73A
1983	Brian Diemer	Michigan	08:27.0
1984	Farley Gerber	Weber St	08:19.3
1985	Peter Koech Kenya	Wash St	08:19.8
1986	Julius Korir Kenya	Wash St	08:21.2
1987	Dan Nelson	Oregon	08:35.4
1988	Karl Van Calcar	Oregon St	08:32.4
1989	Tom Nohilly	Florida	8:45.24A
1990	Mark Croghan	Ohio St	08:36.2
1991	Mark Croghan	Ohio St	08:22.3
1992	Marc Davis	Arizona	08:36.8
1993	Donovan Bergstrom	Wisconsin	08:29.1
1994	Jim Svenøy Norway	UTEP	08:41.2
1995	Jim Svenøy Norway	UTEP	08:21.5
1996	Dmitriy Drozdov Russia	Iowa St	08:32.0
1997	Pascal Dobert	Wisconsin	08:31.7
1998	Matt Kerr Canada	Arkansas	08:37.0
1999	Matt Kerr Canada	Arkansas	08:44.3
2000	Tim Broe	Alabama	08:39.0
2001	Daniel Lincoln	Arkansas	08:42.3
2002	Daniel Lincoln	Arkansas	08:22.3
2003	Daniel Lincoln	Arkansas	08:26.6
2004	Jordan Desilets	Eastern Mich	08:42.6
2005	Mircea Bogdan Romania	UTEP	08:27.3
2006	Joshua McAdams	Brigham Young	08:34.1
2007	Barnabas Kirui Kenya	Ole Miss	08:20.38
2008	Kyle Alcorn	Arizona State	8:28.26
2009	Kyle Perry	BYU	8:29.24
2010	Matt Hughes Canada	Louisville	8:34.18
2011	Matt Hughes Canada	Louisville	8:24.87
2012	Donn Cabral	Princeton	8:35.44
2013	Anthony Rotich	UTEP	8:21.19
2014	Anthony Rotich Kenya	UTEP	8:32.21
2015	Anthony Rotich Kenya	UTEP	8:33.90
2016	Mason Ferlic	Michigan	8:27.16
2017	Edwin Kibichiy Kenya	Louisville	8:28.40
2018	Obsa Ali	Minnesota	8:32.23
2019	Steven Fahy	Stanford	8:38.46
2020	not held		
2021	Kigen Chemadi	Middle Tennessee State	8:28.20
2022	Ahmed Jaziri	Eastern Kentucky	8:18.70
2023	Kenneth Rooks	Brigham Young	8:26.17
2024	Parker Stokes (USA)	Georgetown	8:24.58
2025	James Corrigan (USA)	Brigham Young	8:16.41
2025	Geoffrey Kirwa (KEN)	Louisville	8:17.46
