= Virginia Tech Hokies track and field =

College track and field team

- University: Virginia Polytechnic Institute and State University
- Head coach: Ben Thomas
- Conference: ACC
- Location: Blacksburg, Virginia
- Outdoor track: Johnson / Miller Track Complex
- Nickname: Hokies
- Colors: Chicago maroon and burnt orange

The Virginia Tech Hokies track and field team is the track and field program that represents Virginia Polytechnic Institute and State University. The Hokies compete in NCAA Division I as a member of the Atlantic Coast Conference. The team is based in Blacksburg, Virginia at the Johnson / Miller Track Complex.

The program is coached by Ben Thomas. The track and field program officially encompasses four teams because the NCAA considers men's and women's indoor track and field and outdoor track and field as separate sports.

Queen Claye won the 2010 women's The Bowerman, becoming the only Virginia Tech athlete to win the award.

Spyridon Jullien is the Hokies' only four-time NCAA champion, achieving two titles each in the weight throw for distance and hammer throw.

== Postseason ==
As of 2024, a total of 51 men and 37 women have achieved individual first-team All-American status at the Division I men's outdoor, women's outdoor, men's indoor, or women's indoor national championships (using the modern criteria of top-8 placing regardless of athlete nationality).

First team NCAA All-Americans
Team	Championships	Name	Event	Place	Ref.
Men's	1936 Outdoor	Ivan Mothershead	1500 meters	5th	
Men's	1976 Indoor	Keith Neff	Pole vault	5th	
Men's	1978 Indoor	Dennis Scott	55 meters	5th	
Men's	1980 Indoor	Ken Lewis	55 meters hurdles	6th	
Men's	1980 Indoor	Raymond McDaniels	4 × 800 meters relay	3rd	
Men's	1980 Indoor	Michael Burns	4 × 800 meters relay	3rd	
Men's	1980 Indoor	Ray Ackenbom	4 × 800 meters relay	3rd	
Men's	1980 Indoor	Bruce Merritt	4 × 800 meters relay	3rd	
Men's	1980 Outdoor	Bob Phillips	Pole vault	5th	
Women's	1984 Outdoor	Linda King	10,000 meters	6th	
Men's	1985 Outdoor	Mark Stickley	10,000 meters	8th	
Women's	1985 Outdoor	Linda King	10,000 meters	4th	
Men's	1987 Indoor	Gary Cobb	1000 meters	6th	
Men's	1987 Indoor	Gary Cobb	4 × 800 meters relay	8th	
Men's	1987 Indoor	Ron Voight	4 × 800 meters relay	8th	
Men's	1987 Indoor	Jay Oustrich	4 × 800 meters relay	8th	
Men's	1987 Indoor	Brad Reed	4 × 800 meters relay	8th	
Men's	1987 Outdoor	Gary Cobb	1500 meters	7th	
Men's	1987 Outdoor	Steve Taylor	10,000 meters	3rd	
Men's	1987 Outdoor	Tony Williams	10,000 meters	8th	
Women's	1987 Outdoor	Margie Lasaga	10,000 meters	8th	
Women's	1998 Outdoor	Kathleen Ollendick	Heptathlon	8th	
Men's	2000 Indoor	Brian Hunter	Pole vault	3rd	
Men's	2000 Outdoor	Erick Kingston	Hammer throw	6th	
Women's	2001 Indoor	Kristin Price	3000 meters	4th	
Men's	2003 Outdoor	Spyridon Jullien	Hammer throw	6th	
Men's	2004 Indoor	Spyridon Jullien	Weight throw	4th	
Men's	2004 Outdoor	Spyridon Jullien	Hammer throw	2nd	
Women's	2004 Outdoor	Marlies Overbeeke	1500 meters	8th	
Men's	2005 Indoor	Brian Mondschein	Pole vault	5th	
Men's	2005 Indoor	Spyridon Jullien	Weight throw	1st	
Women's	2005 Indoor	Saskia Triesscheijn	Pentathlon	6th	
Men's	2005 Outdoor	Brian Mondschein	Pole vault	2nd	
Men's	2005 Outdoor	Sven Hahn	Shot put	6th	
Men's	2005 Outdoor	Spyridon Jullien	Hammer throw	1st	
Men's	2006 Indoor	Spyridon Jullien	Weight throw	1st	
Men's	2006 Indoor	Mohsen Anani	Weight throw	4th	
Women's	2006 Indoor	Tamara Burns	Weight throw	6th	
Women's	2006 Indoor	Saskia Triesscheijn	Pentathlon	3rd	
Men's	2006 Outdoor	Brian Mondschein	Pole vault	4th	
Men's	2006 Outdoor	Spyridon Jullien	Hammer throw	1st	
Men's	2006 Outdoor	Mohsen Anani	Hammer throw	4th	
Men's	2006 Outdoor	Matej Muza	Hammer throw	6th	
Women's	2006 Outdoor	Kristen Callan	Hammer throw	7th	
Women's	2006 Outdoor	Saskia Triesschejn	Heptathlon	4th	
Men's	2007 Indoor	Thorsten Mueller	Pole vault	7th	
Women's	2007 Indoor	Jessica Fanning	Distance medley relay	4th	
Women's	2007 Indoor	Sherlenia Green	Distance medley relay	4th	
Women's	2007 Indoor	Asia Washington	Distance medley relay	4th	
Women's	2007 Indoor	Tasmin Fanning	Distance medley relay	4th	
Women's	2007 Indoor	Brittany Pryor	Shot put	7th	
Men's	2007 Outdoor	Justin Clickett	Shot put	6th	
Women's	2007 Outdoor	Queen Claye	100 meters hurdles	5th	
Women's	2007 Outdoor	Queen Claye	400 meters hurdles	3rd	
Men's	2008 Indoor	Yavgeniy Olhovsky	Pole vault	5th	
Women's	2008 Indoor	Kristi Castlin	60 meters hurdles	2nd	
Women's	2008 Indoor	Queen Claye	60 meters hurdles	3rd	
Women's	2008 Indoor	Brittany Pryor	Shot put	7th	
Women's	2008 Indoor	Kristen Callan	Weight throw	7th	
Men's	2008 Outdoor	Yavgeniy Olhovsky	Pole vault	2nd	
Men's	2008 Outdoor	Justin Clickett	Shot put	6th	
Men's	2008 Outdoor	Matej Muza	Hammer throw	5th	
Women's	2008 Outdoor	Tasmin Fanning	5000 meters	6th	
Women's	2008 Outdoor	Kelly Phillips	Pole vault	6th	
Women's	2008 Outdoor	Brittany Pryor	Hammer throw	7th	
Men's	2009 Indoor	Yavgeniy Olhovsky	Pole vault	2nd	
Men's	2009 Indoor	Hunter Hall	Pole vault	7th	
Men's	2009 Indoor	Marcel Lomnický	Weight throw	8th	
Women's	2009 Indoor	Kristi Castlin	60 meters hurdles	3rd	
Men's	2009 Outdoor	Yavgeniy Olhovsky	Pole vault	4th	
Men's	2009 Outdoor	Marcel Lomnický	Hammer throw	1st	
Women's	2009 Outdoor	Kristi Castlin	100 meters hurdles	2nd	
Women's	2009 Outdoor	Asia Washington	400 meters hurdles	4th	
Women's	2009 Outdoor	Dorotea Habazin	Hammer throw	4th	
Men's	2010 Indoor	Yavgeniy Olhovsky	Pole vault	4th	
Men's	2010 Indoor	Alexander Ziegler	Weight throw	3rd	
Women's	2010 Indoor	Queen Claye	60 meters hurdles	1st	
Women's	2010 Indoor	Kristi Castlin	60 meters hurdles	2nd	
Men's	2010 Outdoor	William Mulherin	5000 meters	5th	
Men's	2010 Outdoor	Jared Jodon	Pole vault	7th	
Men's	2010 Outdoor	Yavgeniy Olhovsky	Pole vault	8th	
Men's	2010 Outdoor	Alexander Ziegler	Hammer throw	2nd	
Men's	2010 Outdoor	Marcel Lomnický	Hammer throw	3rd	
Women's	2010 Outdoor	Queen Claye	100 meters hurdles	1st	
Women's	2010 Outdoor	Kristi Castlin	100 meters hurdles	4th	
Women's	2010 Outdoor	Queen Claye	400 meters hurdles	1st	
Women's	2010 Outdoor	Dorotea Habazin	Hammer throw	2nd	
Men's	2011 Indoor	Michael Hammond	Mile run	7th	
Men's	2011 Indoor	Hunter Hall	Pole vault	6th	
Men's	2011 Indoor	Yavgeniy Olhovsky	Pole vault	8th	
Men's	2011 Indoor	Alexander Ziegler	Weight throw	2nd	
Men's	2011 Outdoor	Ronnie Black	High jump	7th	
Men's	2011 Outdoor	Joe Davis	Pole vault	8th	
Men's	2011 Outdoor	Hasheem Halim	Triple jump	4th	
Men's	2011 Outdoor	David Wilson	Triple jump	6th	
Men's	2011 Outdoor	Alexander Ziegler	Hammer throw	1st	
Men's	2011 Outdoor	Marcel Lomnický	Hammer throw	2nd	
Men's	2011 Outdoor	Matthias Treff	Javelin throw	2nd	
Women's	2011 Outdoor	Samira Burkhardt	Shot put	5th	
Women's	2011 Outdoor	Dorotea Habazin	Hammer throw	1st	
Men's	2012 Indoor	Hasheem Halim	Triple jump	3rd	
Men's	2012 Indoor	Marcel Lomnický	Weight throw	1st	
Men's	2012 Indoor	Alexander Ziegler	Weight throw	3rd	
Women's	2012 Indoor	Martina Schultze	Pole vault	7th	
Women's	2012 Indoor	Victoria von Eynatten	Pole vault	8th	
Men's	2012 Outdoor	Darrell Wesh	100 meters	4th	
Men's	2012 Outdoor	Michael Hammond	1500 meters	4th	
Men's	2012 Outdoor	Joe Davis	Pole vault	7th	
Men's	2012 Outdoor	Hasheem Halim	Triple jump	4th	
Men's	2012 Outdoor	Alexander Ziegler	Hammer throw	1st	
Men's	2012 Outdoor	Matthias Treff	Javelin throw	3rd	
Men's	2013 Indoor	William Mulherin	3000 meters	7th	
Men's	2013 Indoor	Ronnie Black	High jump	4th	
Men's	2013 Indoor	Jeff Artis-Gray	Long jump	7th	
Men's	2013 Indoor	Alexander Ziegler	Weight throw	1st	
Women's	2013 Indoor	Martina Schultze	Pole vault	3rd	
Men's	2013 Outdoor	Jeff Artis-Gray	Long jump	5th	
Men's	2013 Outdoor	Tomas Kruzliak	Hammer throw	1st	
Women's	2013 Outdoor	Martina Schultze	Pole vault	8th	
Men's	2014 Indoor	Martin Dally	Distance medley relay	6th	
Men's	2014 Indoor	Tihut Degfae	Distance medley relay	6th	
Men's	2014 Indoor	Grant Pollock	Distance medley relay	6th	
Men's	2014 Indoor	Juan Campos	Distance medley relay	6th	
Men's	2014 Indoor	Torben Laidig	Pole vault	6th	
Women's	2014 Indoor	Amanda Smith	800 meters	5th	
Women's	2014 Indoor	Martina Schultze	Pole vault	7th	
Men's	2014 Outdoor	Grant Pollock	1500 meters	6th	
Men's	2014 Outdoor	Tomas Kruzliak	Hammer throw	5th	
Women's	2014 Outdoor	Martina Schultze	Pole vault	3rd	
Women's	2014 Outdoor	Sabine Kopplin	Javelin throw	7th	
Men's	2015 Indoor	Tommy Curtin	3000 meters	8th	
Men's	2015 Indoor	Tommy Curtin	5000 meters	8th	
Men's	2015 Indoor	Manuel Ziegler	Triple jump	4th	
Women's	2015 Indoor	Hanna Green	800 meters	5th	
Men's	2015 Outdoor	Tommy Curtin	5000 meters	7th	
Men's	2015 Outdoor	Tomas Kruzliak	Hammer throw	4th	
Women's	2015 Outdoor	Hanna Green	800 meters	3rd	
Women's	2015 Outdoor	Irena Gillarová	Javelin throw	1st	
Men's	2016 Indoor	Tommy Curtin	5000 meters	2nd	
Men's	2016 Indoor	Deakin Volz	Pole vault	3rd	
Women's	2016 Indoor	Hanna Green	800 meters	2nd	
Men's	2016 Outdoor	Tommy Curtin	5000 meters	4th	
Men's	2016 Outdoor	Torben Laidig	Pole vault	2nd	
Men's	2016 Outdoor	Marek Barta	Discus throw	3rd	
Men's	2017 Indoor	Drew Piazza	800 meters	2nd	
Men's	2017 Indoor	Neil Gourley	Mile run	4th	
Men's	2017 Indoor	Daniel Jaskowak	Distance medley relay	2nd	
Men's	2017 Indoor	Gregory Chiles	Distance medley relay	2nd	
Men's	2017 Indoor	Kevin Cianfarini	Distance medley relay	2nd	
Men's	2017 Indoor	Vincent Ciattei	Distance medley relay	2nd	
Men's	2017 Indoor	Torben Laidig	Pole vault	6th	
Women's	2017 Indoor	Hanna Green	800 meters	2nd	
Men's	2017 Outdoor	Drew Piazza	800 meters	6th	
Men's	2017 Outdoor	Neil Gourley	1500 meters	5th	
Men's	2017 Outdoor	Marek Barta	Discus throw	7th	
Women's	2017 Outdoor	Hanna Green	800 meters	2nd	
Women's	2017 Outdoor	Emma Thor	Hammer throw	8th	
Women's	2017 Outdoor	Irena Gillarová	Javelin throw	1st	
Men's	2018 Indoor	Vincent Ciattei	Mile run	2nd	
Men's	2018 Indoor	Patrick Joseph	Mile run	4th	
Men's	2018 Indoor	Neil Gourley	Mile run	7th	
Men's	2018 Indoor	Vincent Ciattei	Distance medley relay	1st	
Men's	2018 Indoor	Gregory Chiles	Distance medley relay	1st	
Men's	2018 Indoor	Patrick Joseph	Distance medley relay	1st	
Men's	2018 Indoor	Neil Gourley	Distance medley relay	1st	
Men's	2018 Indoor	Deakin Volz	Pole vault	3rd	
Women's	2018 Indoor	Rachel Pocratsky	800 meters	6th	
Women's	2018 Indoor	Katie Kennedy	Distance medley relay	3rd	
Women's	2018 Indoor	Courtney Blanden	Distance medley relay	3rd	
Women's	2018 Indoor	Laurie Barton	Distance medley relay	3rd	
Women's	2018 Indoor	Sarah Edwards	Distance medley relay	3rd	
Women's	2018 Indoor	Lisa Gunnarsson	Pole vault	4th	
Men's	2018 Outdoor	Vincent Ciattei	1500 meters	2nd	
Men's	2018 Outdoor	Torben Laidig	Pole vault	3rd	
Men's	2018 Outdoor	Deakin Volz	Pole vault	7th	
Men's	2018 Outdoor	Joel Benitez	Pole vault	8th	
Women's	2018 Outdoor	Rachel Pocratsky	1500 meters	5th	
Women's	2018 Outdoor	Lisa Gunnarsson	Pole vault	3rd	
Women's	2018 Outdoor	Rachel Baxter	Pole vault	4th	
Women's	2018 Outdoor	Eszter Bajnok	Triple jump	5th	
Women's	2018 Outdoor	Pavla Kuklova	Hammer throw	6th	
Women's	2019 Indoor	Rachel Pocratsky	800 meters	3rd	
Women's	2019 Indoor	Sarah Edwards	Mile run	6th	
Women's	2019 Indoor	Rachel Baxter	Pole vault	6th	
Men's	2021 Indoor	Jacory Patterson	400 meters	3rd	
Men's	2021 Indoor	Bashir Mosavel-lo	800 meters	8th	
Men's	2021 Indoor	Ethan Mills	Distance medley relay	5th	
Men's	2021 Indoor	Patrick Forrest	Distance medley relay	5th	
Men's	2021 Indoor	Thierry Siewe Yanga	Distance medley relay	5th	
Men's	2021 Indoor	Ben Fleming	Distance medley relay	5th	
Women's	2021 Indoor	Lindsey Butler	800 meters	4th	
Women's	2021 Indoor	Rachel Baxter	Pole vault	4th	
Women's	2021 Indoor	Essence Henderson	Shot put	4th	
Men's	2021 Outdoor	Diego Zarate	1500 meters	7th	
Men's	2021 Outdoor	Alexios Prodanas	Hammer throw	5th	
Women's	2021 Outdoor	Lindsey Butler	800 meters	6th	
Women's	2021 Outdoor	Essence Henderson	Discus throw	7th	
Men's	2022 Indoor	Antonio Lopez Segura	3000 meters	6th	
Women's	2022 Indoor	Lindsey Butler	800 meters	1st	
Women's	2022 Indoor	Rachel Baxter	Pole vault	1st	
Women's	2022 Indoor	Julia Fixsen	Pole vault	3rd	
Women's	2022 Indoor	Victoria Gorlova	Triple jump	8th	
Women's	2022 Indoor	Rebecca Mammel	Weight throw	7th	
Women's	2022 Outdoor	Rachel Baxter	Pole vault	4th	
Women's	2022 Outdoor	Julia Fixsen	Pole vault	5th	
Women's	2022 Outdoor	Sara Killinen	Hammer throw	4th	
Women's	2023 Indoor	Kenna Stimmel	Pole vault	4th	
Women's	2023 Indoor	Rebecca Mammel	Weight throw	7th	
Women's	2023 Outdoor	Julia Fixsen	Pole vault	1st	
Women's	2023 Outdoor	Kenna Stimmel	Pole vault	8th	
Men's	2024 Indoor	Judson Lincoln IV	400 meters	3rd	
Men's	2024 Indoor	Nick Plant	800 meters	4th	
Men's	2024 Indoor	Conner McClure	Pole vault	3rd	
Women's	2024 Indoor	Lindsey Butler	800 meters	7th	
Women's	2024 Indoor	Victoria Gorlova	Triple jump	4th	
Women's	2024 Indoor	Sara Killinen	Weight throw	8th	
Men's	2024 Outdoor	Judson Lincoln IV	400 meters	5th	
Men's	2024 Outdoor	Nick Plant	800 meters	8th	
Men's	2024 Outdoor	Conner McClure	Pole vault	8th	
Women's	2024 Outdoor	Lindsey Butler	1500 meters	7th	

== See also ==
- Category:Virginia Tech Hokies men's track and field athletes (15)
- Category:Virginia Tech Hokies women's track and field athletes (8)
