= Mondschein =

Mondschein is a surname. Notable people with the surname include:

- Brian Mondschein (born 1983), American-born Israeli pole vaulter
- Irving Mondschein (1924–2015), American former track and field athlete and football player
- Jerzy Mondschein (1909–1944), Polish Air Force officer
- Kurt Mondschein, German footballer
- Selig Hirsch Mondschein (1812–1872), Galician Jewish writer

Also, it is the nickname of one of Ludwig van Beethoven's most famous compositions, for solo piano: Mondscheinsonate (Moonlight Sonata) (1801–1802)
