= 2018 NCAA Division I Indoor Track and Field Championships =

- Dates: March 9-10, 2018
- Host city: College Station, Texas; Texas A&M University
- Venue: Gilliam Indoor Track Stadium
- Events: 34

The 2018 NCAA Division I Indoor Track and Field Championships was the 54th NCAA Men's Division I Indoor Track and Field Championships and the 37th NCAA Women's Division I Indoor Track and Field Championships, held at the Gilliam Indoor Track Stadium in College Station, Texas near the campus of the host school, the Texas A&M University. In total, thirty-four different men's and women's indoor track and field events were contested from March 9 to March 10, 2018.

== Results ==
=== Men's results ===
==== 60 meters ====
- Final results shown, not prelims

Rank	Name	University	Time	Notes
1st place, gold medalist(s)	Elijah Hall	Houston	6.52	PB
2nd place, silver medalist(s)	Raheem Chambers	Auburn	6.53	PB
3rd place, bronze medalist(s)	Demek Kemp	South Carolina St.	6.55	PB
4	Cejhae Greene	Georgia	6.61	PB
5	Jaylen Bacon	Arkansas State	6.62 (6.613)	
6	Divine Oduduru	Texas Tech	6.62 (6.617)	
7	Kendal Williams	Georgia	6.65	
8	Jaylan Mitchell	N. Carolina A&T	6.69	

==== 200 meters ====
- Final results shown, not prelims

Rank	Name	University	Time	Notes
1st place, gold medalist(s)	Elijah Hall	Houston	20.02	PB CR FR NCAAR
2nd place, silver medalist(s)	Divine Oduduru	Texas Tech	20.21	
3rd place, bronze medalist(s)	Rai Benjamin	USC	20.34	PB
4	Jaron Flournoy	LSU	20.55	PB
5	Ncincilili Titi	South Carolina	20.65	
6	Andrew Hudson	Texas Tech	20.73	
7	Kenzo Cotton	Arkansas	20.85	
8	Andre Ewers	Florida State	20.88	

==== 400 meters ====
- Final results shown, not prelims

Rank	Name	University	Time	Notes
1st place, gold medalist(s)	Michael Norman	USC	44.52	PB CR FR NCAAR WR
2nd place, silver medalist(s)	Akeem Bloomfield	Auburn	44.86	PB
3rd place, bronze medalist(s)	Mylik Kerley	Texas A&M	45.16	PB
4	Kahmari Montgomery	Houston	45.24	PB
5	Nathon Allen	Auburn	45.27	PB
6	Nathan Strother	Tennessee	45.67	
7	Derrick Mokaleng	TCU	45.68	PB
8	Zach Shinnick	USC	45.81	PB

==== 800 meters ====
- Final results shown, not prelims

Rank	Name	University	Time	Notes
1st place, gold medalist(s)	Michael Saruni	UTEP	1:45.15	PB CR FR
2nd place, silver medalist(s)	Isaiah Harris	Penn State	1:46.08	PB
3rd place, bronze medalist(s)	Robert Heppenstall	Wake Forest	1:46.88	
4	Daniel Kuhn	Indiana	1:47.37	
5	Abraham Alvarado	BYU	1:47.55	
6	Dejon Devroe	Miss State	1:47.69	PB
7	John Lewis	Clemson	1:47.71	
8	Bryce Hoppel	Kansas	1:50.06	

==== Mile ====
- Final results shown, not prelims

Rank	Name	University	Time	Notes
1st place, gold medalist(s)	Josh Kerr	New Mexico	3:57.02	
2nd place, silver medalist(s)	Vincent Ciattei	Virginia Tech	3:58.36	PB
3rd place, bronze medalist(s)	Sam Prakel	Oregon	3:58.59	
4	Patrick Joseph	Virginia Tech	4:00.39	
5	Kasey Knevelbaard	Southern Utah	4:00.57	
6	Cole Rockhold	Colorado St.	4:00.61	
7	Neil Gourley	Virginia Tech	4:00.64	
8	Reed Brown	Oregon	4:01.94	
9	Jonah Koech	UTEP	4:02.26	
10	Sean Tobin	Ole Miss	4:06.90	

==== 3000 meters ====
Rank	Name	University	Time	Notes
1st place, gold medalist(s)	Andy Trouard	Northern Arizona	8:04.94	
2nd place, silver medalist(s)	Justyn Knight	Syracuse	8:05.76	
3rd place, bronze medalist(s)	Cameron Griffith	Arkansas	8:05.91	
4	Grant Fisher	Stanford	8:06.52	
5	Dillon Maggard	Utah State	8:06.69	
6	James West	Oregon	8:06.94	
7	Colby Gilbert	Washington	8:07.26	
8	Ollie Hoare	Wisconsin	8:08.30	
9	Cole Rockhold	Colorado St.	8:09.85	
10	Ben Saarel	Colorado	8:10.05	
11	Matthew Baxter	Northern Arizona	8:10.28	
12	Lawrence Kipkoech	Campbell	8:11.28	
13	Kigen Chemadi	Mid. Tenn. State	8:12.40	
14	Kyle Mau	Indiana	8:12.60	
15	Jonathan Davis	Illinois	8:21.69	
16	Mike Tate	Southern Utah	8:26.19	

==== 5000 meters ====
Rank	Name	University	Time	Notes
1st place, gold medalist(s)	Justyn Knight	Syracuse	14:14.47	
2nd place, silver medalist(s)	Vincent Kiprop	Alabama	14:15.01	
3rd place, bronze medalist(s)	Hassan Abdi	Oklahoma State	14:15.38	
4	Mike Tate	Southern Utah	14:15.67	
5	Andy Trouard	Northern Arizona	14:16.39	PB
6	Rory Linkletter	BYU	14:16.88	
7	Jacob Thomson	Kentucky	14:17.19	
8	Amon Kemboi	Campbell	14:17.42	
9	Steven Fahy	Stanford	14:17.51	
10	Gilbert Kigen	Alabama	14:17.73	
11	Lawrence Kipkoech	Campbell	14:18.00	
12	Jack Bruce	Arkansas	14:18.64	
13	Connor McMillan	BYU	14:18.87	
14	Grant Fischer	Colorado St.	14:21.82	
15	Daniel Carney	BYU	14:22.90	
16	Tanner Anderson	Oregon	14:22.93	

==== 60 meter hurdles ====
- Final results shown, not prelims

Rank	Name	University	Time	Notes
1st place, gold medalist(s)	Grant Holloway	Florida	7.47	FR
2nd place, silver medalist(s)	Antoine Lloyd	Nebraska	7.60	PB
3rd place, bronze medalist(s)	Ashtyn Davis	California	7.63	PB
4	Jovaine Atkinson	Liberty	7.72 (7.713)	
5	Chad Zallow	Youngstown St.	7.72 (7.720)	
6	Trey Cunningham	Florida State	7.74	
7	Michael Nicholls	Georgia	7.77	
8	Damion Thomas	LSU	8.25	

==== 4 x 400 meters relay ====
Rank	University	Time	Notes
1st place, gold medalist(s)	USC	3:00.77^{1}	CR FR NCAAR
2nd place, silver medalist(s)	Texas A&M	3:01.39	WR
3rd place, bronze medalist(s)	Florida	3:01.43	
4	Arkansas	3:05.14	
5	Auburn	3:05.30	
6	LSU	3:05.31	
7	TCU	3:05.60	
8	Ohio State	3:05.95	
9	Iowa	3:06.34	
10	Tennessee	3:07.88	
11	Kansas	3:07.98	
12	Minnesota	3:08.20	
13	Houston	3:08.86	
	Texas Tech	DQ	
	Nebraska	DQ	
	Penn State	DQ	

^{1} The USC time of 3:00.77 was rejected as a record as the team consisted of three Americans and one from Antigua and Barbuda: IAAF rules require all runners of a relay team to be of the same nationality for records.

==== Distance Medley Relay ====
Rank	University	Time	Notes
1st place, gold medalist(s)	Virginia Tech	9:30.76	
2nd place, silver medalist(s)	Notre Dame	9:31.22	
3rd place, bronze medalist(s)	Oregon	9:31.45	
4	Stanford	9:31.95	
5	Utah State	9:32.31	
6	Wisconsin	9:33.27	
7	Indiana	9:35.17	
8	Villanova	9:35.49	
9	Brown	9:40.24	
10	Ole Miss	9:41.75	
11	Georgetown	9:51.97	
12	New Mexico	9:55.11	

==== High Jump ====
Rank	Name	University	Best Jump	Notes
1st place, gold medalist(s)	Randall Cunningham II	USC	2.29 m (7 ft 6 in)	PB
2nd place, silver medalist(s)	Trey Culver	Texas Tech	2.29 m (7 ft 6 in)	
3rd place, bronze medalist(s)	Shelby McEwen	Alabama	2.29 m (7 ft 6 in)	PB
4	Vernon Turner	Oklahoma	2.23 m (7 ft 3 3/4 in)	
5	Tequan Claitt	Eastern Kentucky	2.20 m (7 ft 2 1/2 in)	
6	Keenon Laine	Georgia	2.20 m (7 ft 2 1/2 in)	
7	Darius Carbin	Georgia	2.20 m (7 ft 2 1/2 in)	
8	Javen Reeves	Louisville	2.20 m (7 ft 2 1/2 in)	
9	Landon Bartel	Nebraska	2.15 m (7 ft 1/2 in)	
10	Brenton Foster	Manhattan	2.15 m (7 ft 1/2 in)	
10	Tyler Adams	Sam Houston St.	2.15 m (7 ft 1/2 in)	
12	Ryan Lockard	Minnesota	2.15 m (7 ft 1/2 in)	
13	Jerin Allen	Louisville	2.15 m (7 ft 1/2 in)	
14	JuVaughn Blake	LSU	2.10 m (6 ft 10 1/2 in)	
15	Grant Anderson	Nebraska	2.10 m (6 ft 10 1/2 in)	
15	Daniel Armstrong	Marquette	2.10 m (6 ft 10 1/2 in)	

==== Pole Vault ====
Rank	Name	University	Best Jump	Notes
1st place, gold medalist(s)	Hussain Alhizam	Kansas	5.70 m (18 ft 8 1/4 in)	PB FR
2nd place, silver medalist(s)	Chris Nilsen	South Dakota	5.60 m (18 ft 4 1/4 in)	
3rd place, bronze medalist(s)	Deakin Volz	Virginia Tech	5.60 m (18 ft 4 1/4 in)	
4	Matthew Ludwig	Akron	5.55 m (18 ft 2 1/2 in)	
5	Audie Wyatt	Texas A&M	5.55 m (18 ft 2 1/2 in)	PB
5	Adrián Vallés	Cincinnati	5.55 m (18 ft 2 1/2 in)	
7	Jacob Wooten	Texas A&M	5.50 m (18 ft 1/2 in)	
8	Tray Oates	Samford	5.50 m (18 ft 1/2 in)	
9	Brandon Bray	Texas Tech	5.50 m (18 ft 1/2 in)	PB
10	Chase Smith	Washington	5.40 m (17 ft 8 1/2 in)	
11	Tim Ehrhardt	Michigan State	5.40 m (17 ft 8 1/2 in)	
12	Antonio Ruiz	Stephen F. Austin	5.40 m (17 ft 8 1/2 in)	
13	Torben Laidig	Virginia Tech	5.30 m (17 ft 4 1/2 in)	
13	Scott Marshall	Grand Canyon	5.30 m (17 ft 4 1/2 in)	
15	Drew McMichael	Texas Tech	5.30 m (17 ft 4 1/2 in)	
	Cole Gorski	Ohio State	NH	

==== Long Jump ====
Rank	Name	University	Best Jump	Notes
1st place, gold medalist(s)	Will Williams	Texas A&M	8.19 m (26 ft 10 1/4 in)	PB FR
2nd place, silver medalist(s)	Grant Holloway	Florida	8.13 m (26 ft 8 in)	PB
3rd place, bronze medalist(s)	Charles Brown	Texas Tech	8.12 m (26 ft 7 1/2 in)	PB
4	Zack Bazile	Ohio State	7.96 m (26 ft 1 1/4 in)	
5	Steffin McCarter	Texas	7.94 m (26 ft 1/2 in)	
6	KeAndre Bates	Florida	7.90 m (25 ft 11 in)	
7	Ja'Mari Ward	Missouri	7.82 m (25 ft 7 3/4 in)	
8	Kenneth Fisher	Florida State	7.62 m (25 ft 0 in)	
9	Jordan Latimer	Akron	7.58 m (24 ft 10 1/4 in)	
10	O'Brien Wasome	Texas	7.53 m (24 ft 8 1/4 in)	
11	Laquan Nairn	Arkansas	7.52 m (24 ft 8 in)	
12	Scotty Newton	TCU	7.47 m (24 ft 6 in)	
13	Corion Knight	Florida State	7.43 m (24 ft 4 1/2 in)	
14	Yann Randrianasolo	South Carolina	7.21 m (23 ft 7 3/4 in)	
15	JuVaughn Blake	LSU	7.06 m (23 ft 1 3/4 in)	
16	Treyton Harris	Indiana	7.06 m (23 ft 1 3/4 in)	

==== Triple Jump ====
Rank	Name	University	Best Jump	Notes
1st place, gold medalist(s)	O'Brien Wasome	Texas	16.82 m (55 ft 2 in)	PB
2nd place, silver medalist(s)	KeAndre Bates	Florida	16.67 m (54 ft 8 1/4 in)	
3rd place, bronze medalist(s)	Chengetayi Mapaya	TCU	16.38 m (53 ft 8 3/4 in)	PB
4	Clayton Brown	Florida	16.34 m (53 ft 7 1/4 in)	
5	Tuomas Kaukolahti	California	16.33 m (53 ft 6 3/4 in)	PB
6	John Warren	Southern Miss.	16.31 m (53 ft 6 in)	
7	Scotty Newton	TCU	16.24 m (53 ft 3 1/4 in)	
8	Barden Adams	Kansas	16.19 m (53 ft 1 1/4 in)	PB
9	Charles Brown	Texas Tech	16.17 m (53 ft 1/2 in)	
10	Kaiwan Culmer	Nebraska	15.97 m (52 ft 4 1/2 in)	
11	Jeremiah Green	Clemson	15.86 m (52 ft 1/4 in)	
12	Jordan Scott	Virginia	15.84 m (51 ft 11 1/2 in)	
13	Armani Wallace	Florida State	15.84 m (51 ft 11 1/2 in)	
14	Craig Stevens Jr	Kent State	15.70 m (51 ft 6 in)	
15	Bryce Williams	Penn State	15.43 m (50 ft 7 1/4 in)	
16	Papay Glaywulu	Oklahoma	15.04 m (49 ft 4 in)	

==== Shot Put ====
Rank	Name	University	Best Throw	Notes
1st place, gold medalist(s)	Mostafa Hassan	Colorado St.	20.86 m (68 ft 5 1/4 in)	
2nd place, silver medalist(s)	Denzel Comenentia	Georgia	20.29 m (66 ft 6 3/4 in)	
3rd place, bronze medalist(s)	Josh Awotunde	South Carolina	20.15 m (66 ft 1 1/4 in)	
4	Austin Droogsma	Florida State	19.87 m (65 ft 2 1/4 in)	
5	Jordan Geist	Arizona	19.62 m (64 ft 4 1/4 in)	
6	Kord Ferguson	Alabama	19.58 m (64 ft 2 3/4 in)	
7	Adrian Piperi	Texas	19.46 m (63 ft 10 in)	
8	McKay Johnson	California	19.34 m (63 ft 5 1/4 in)	
9	Nick Demaline	Ohio State	19.24 m (63 ft 1 1/4 in)	
10	Nicolai Ceban	Kansas	18.99 m (62 ft 3 1/2 in)	
11	Jared Kern	Southern Illinois	18.90 m (62 ft 0 in)	
12	Nate Esparza	UCLA	18.79 m (61 ft 7 3/4 in)	
13	Dotun Ogundeji	UCLA	18.54 m (60 ft 9 3/4 in)	
14	Andrew Liskowitz	Michigan	18.38 m (60 ft 3 1/2 in)	
15	Itamar Levi	Arkansas State	17.98 m (58 ft 11 3/4 in)	
	Nicholas Ponzio	USC	FOUL	

==== Weight Throw ====
Rank	Name	University	Best Throw	Notes
1st place, gold medalist(s)	David Lucas	Penn State	24.02 m (78 ft 9 1/2 in)	PB FR
2nd place, silver medalist(s)	Alton Clay	UL-Monroe	22.96 m (75 ft 3 3/4 in)	
3rd place, bronze medalist(s)	Josh Davis	North Carolina St.	22.94 m (75 ft 3 in)	
4	Daniel Haugh	Alabama	22.83 m (74 ft 10 3/4 in)	
5	Joseph Ellis	Michigan	22.56 m (74 ft 0 in)	
6	Denzel Comenentia	Georgia	22.45 m (73 ft 7 3/4 in)	
7	Michael Shanahan	New Hampshire	22.16 m (72 ft 8 1/4 in)	PB
8	Alan Zapalac	Texas	22.15 m (72 ft 8 in)	PB
9	AJ McFarland	Florida	21.80 m (71 ft 6 1/4 in)	
10	Morgan Shigo	Penn State	20.87 m (68 ft 5 1/2 in)	
11	Thomas Mardal	Florida	20.85 m (68 ft 4 3/4 in)	
12	Grant Cartwright	Michigan	20.82 m (68 ft 3 1/2 in)	
13	Benjamin Johnson	East Tenn. St.	20.70 m (67 ft 10 3/4 in)	
14	Andrew Miller	Indiana	20.51 m (67 ft 3 1/4 in)	
	Adam Kelly	Princeton	FOUL	
	Isaac Ingram	Southern Illinois	FOUL	

==== Heptathlon ====
Rank	Name	University	Overall points	60 m	LJ	SP	HJ	60 m H	PV	1000 m
1st place, gold medalist(s)	Tim Duckworth	Kentucky	6188	940; 6.84	995; 7.74 m (25 ft 4 1/2 in)	703; 13.59 m (44 ft 7 in)	963; 2.17 m (7 ft 1 1/4 in)	925; 8.23	960; 5.16 m (16 ft 11 in)	702; 2:56.23
2nd place, silver medalist(s)	Hunter Veith	Wichita State	6090	918; 6.90	945; 7.54 m (24 ft 8 3/4 in)	691; 13.39 m (43 ft 11 in)	878; 2.08 m (6 ft 9 3/4 in)	984; 7.99	837; 4.76 m (15 ft 7 1/4 in)	837; 2:43.33
3rd place, bronze medalist(s)	Tyler Adams	Sam Houston St.	6081	886; 6.99	905; 7.38 m (24 ft 2 1/2 in)	614; 12.12 m (39 ft 9 in)	992; 2.20 m (7 ft 2 1/2 in)	989; 7.97	778; 4.56 m (14 ft 11 1/2 in)	917; 2:36.14
4	Johannes Erm	Georgia	5988	844; 7.11	970; 7.64 m (25 ft 3/4 in)	714; 13.77 m (45 ft 2 in)	794; 1.99 m (6 ft 6 1/4 in)	888; 8.38	898; 4.96 m (16 ft 3 1/4 in)	880; 2:39.45
5	TJ Lawson	Kent State	5934	851; 7.09	910; 7.40 m (24 ft 3 1/4 in)	757; 14.46 m (47 ft 5 1/4 in)	822; 2.02 m (6 ft 7 1/2 in)	893; 8.36	837; 4.76 m (15 ft 7 1/4 in)	864; 2:40.89
6	Gabe Moore	Arkansas	5874	904; 6.94	893; 7.33 m (24 ft 1/2 in)	752; 14.38 m (47 ft 2 in)	794; 1.99 m (6 ft 6 1/4 in)	954; 8.11	748; 4.46 m (14 ft 7 1/2 in)	829; 2:44.01
7	Karl Saluri	Georgia	5781	933; 6.86	903; 7.37 m (24 ft 2 in)	683; 13.26 m (43 ft 6 in)	687; 1.87 m (6 ft 1 1/2 in)	881; 8.41	778; 4.56 m (14 ft 11 1/2 in)	916; 2:36.23
8	Nathaniel Mechler	Houston	5758	858; 7.07	930; 7.48 m (24 ft 6 1/4 in)	630; 12.39 m (40 ft 7 3/4 in)	740; 1.93 m (6 ft 3 3/4 in)	910; 8.29	807; 4.66 m (15 ft 3 1/4 in)	883; 2:39.11
9	Joe Delgado	Louisville	5730	861; 7.06	838; 7.10 m (23 ft 3 1/2 in)	701; 13.55 m (44 ft 5 1/4 in)	740; 1.93 m (6 ft 3 3/4 in)	884; 8.40	778; 4.56 m (14 ft 11 1/2 in)	928; 2:35.16
10	Teddy Frid	Minnesota	5717	847; 7.10	781; 6.86 m (22 ft 6 in)	606; 12.00 m (39 ft 4 1/4 in)	794; 1.99 m (6 ft 6 1/4 in)	925; 8.23	868; 4.86 m (15 ft 11 1/4 in)	896; 2:38.00
11	Trent Nytes	Wisconsin	5706	844; 7.11	833; 7.08 m (23 ft 2 1/2 in)	698; 13.50 m (44 ft 3 1/4 in)	906; 2.11 m (6 ft 11 in)	877; 8.43	719; 4.36 m (14 ft 3 1/2 in)	829; 2:44.03
12	Alex Bloom	Cincinnati	5618	858; 7.07	823; 7.04 m (23 ft 1 in)	654; 12.78 m (41 ft 11 in)	822; 2.02 m (6 ft 7 1/2 in)	893; 8.36	778; 4.56 m (14 ft 11 1/2 in)	790; 2:47.70
13	Nick Guerrant	Michigan State	5519	865; 7.05	769; 6.81 m (22 ft 4 in)	614; 12.12 m (39 ft 9 in)	850; 2.05 m (6 ft 8 1/2 in)	905; 8.31	748; 4.46 m (14 ft 7 1/2 in)	768; 2:49.80
14	George Patrick	Texas	5398	882; 7.00	891; 7.32 m (24 ft 0 in)	677; 13.16 m (43 ft 2 in)	636; 1.81 m (5 ft 11 1/4 in)	944; 8.15	691; 4.26 m (13 ft 11 1/2 in)	677; 2:58.66
15	Zachary Lorbeck	Wisconsin	5395	889; 6.98	783; 6.87 m (22 ft 6 1/4 in)	735; 14.11 m (46 ft 3 1/2 in)	822; 2.02 m (6 ft 7 1/2 in)	750; 8.98	691; 4.26 m (13 ft 11 1/2 in)	725; 2:53.96
16	Scott Filip	Rice	5057	933; 6.86	920; 7.44 m (24 ft 4 3/4 in)	673; 13.10 m (42 ft 11 1/2 in)	822; 2.02 m (6 ft 7 1/2 in)	925; 8.23	0 NH	784; 2:48.29

=== Men's team scores ===
- Top 10 and ties shown

Rank	University	Team score
1st place, gold medalist(s)	Florida	40
2nd place, silver medalist(s)	USC	37
3rd place, bronze medalist(s)	Georgia	32
4	Virginia Tech	31
5	Texas A&M	29.5
6	Texas Tech	28
7	Houston	26
8	Auburn	24
9	Alabama	22
10	Syracuse	18
10	Penn State	18

=== Women's results ===
==== 60 meters ====
- Final results shown, not prelims

Rank	Name	University	Time	Notes
1st place, gold medalist(s)	Aleia Hobbs	LSU	7.07	PB CR FR NCAAR
2nd place, silver medalist(s)	Mikiah Brisco	LSU	7.11	
3rd place, bronze medalist(s)	Natalliah Whyte	Auburn	7.12	PB
4	Jonielle Smith	Auburn	7.19	
5	Ashley Henderson	San Diego St.	7.20	
6	Kate Hall	Georgia	7.24	
7	Kortnei Johnson	LSU	7.26	
8	Cassondra Hall	LSU	7.32	

==== 200 meters ====
- Final results shown, not prelims

Rank	Name	University	Time	Notes
1st place, gold medalist(s)	Gabrielle Thomas	Harvard	22.38	PB CR FR NCAAR
2nd place, silver medalist(s)	Ashley Henderson	San Diego St.	22.41	PB
3rd place, bronze medalist(s)	Lynna Irby	Georgia	22.55	PB
4	Sydney McLaughlin	Kentucky	22.80	
5	Kortnei Johnson	LSU	22.90	
6	Ka'Tia Seymour	Florida State	23.01	
7	Jasmine Camacho-Quinn	Kentucky	23.05	
8	Danyel White	Texas A&M	23.09	

==== 400 meters ====
- Final results shown, not prelims

Rank	Name	University	Time	Notes
1st place, gold medalist(s)	Kendall Ellis	USC	50.34	PB CR FR NCAAR
2nd place, silver medalist(s)	Sydney McLaughlin	Kentucky	50.36	PB
3rd place, bronze medalist(s)	Lynna Irby	Georgia	50.87	
4	Sharrika Barnett	Florida	51.07	PB
5	Brionna Thomas	Purdue	51.56	PB
6	Briana Guillory	Iowa	51.68	PB
7	Ama Pipi	Oklahoma	52.47	
8	Kiana Horton	Baylor	52.82	

==== 800 meters ====
- Final results shown, not prelims

Rank	Name	University	Time	Notes
1st place, gold medalist(s)	Sabrina Southerland	Oregon	2:01.55	PB
2nd place, silver medalist(s)	Síofra Cléirigh Büttner	Villanova	2:02.46	PB
3rd place, bronze medalist(s)	Sammy Watson	Texas A&M	2:02.65	PB
4	Ashley Taylor	Northern Arizona	2:03.66	PB
5	Jazmine Fray	Texas A&M	2:03.88	
6	Rachel Pocratsky	Virginia Tech	2:03.93	
7	Danae Rivers	Penn State	2:04.20	
8	Olivia Baker	Stanford	2:04.54	

==== Mile ====
- Final results shown, not prelims

Rank	Name	University	Time	Notes
1st place, gold medalist(s)	Elinor Purrier	New Hampshire	4:31.76	
2nd place, silver medalist(s)	Dani Jones	Colorado	4:31.82	PB
3rd place, bronze medalist(s)	Nikki Hiltz	Arkansas	4:32.59	PB
4	Rhianwedd Price-Weimer	Miss State	4:33.00	
5	Elise Cranny	Stanford	4:34.48	
6	Millie Paladino	Providence	4:34.93	
7	Whittni Orton	BYU	4:35.44	
8	Jessica Harris	Notre Dame	4:37.22	
9	Amy Cashin	West Virginia	4:43.67	
10	Sarah Hardie	Columbia	4:51.07	

==== 3000 meters ====
Rank	Name	University	Time	Notes
1st place, gold medalist(s)	Karissa Schweizer	Missouri	8:53.36	
2nd place, silver medalist(s)	Allie Ostrander	Boise State	8:54.35	
3rd place, bronze medalist(s)	Jessica Hull	Oregon	9:01.96	
4	Vanessa Fraser	Stanford	9:02.31	
5	Weini Kelati	New Mexico	9:03.51	PB
6	Sharon Lokedi	Kansas	9:03.68	
7	Christina Aragon	Stanford	9:03.71	
8	Ednah Kurgat	New Mexico	9:03.81	
9	Lilli Burdon	Oregon	9:04.62	
10	Fiona O'Keeffe	Stanford	9:10.54	
11	Alsu Bogdanova	Eastern Michigan	9:12.81	
12	Amy-Eloise Neale	Washington	9:20.24	
13	Erin Clark	Colorado	9:21.07	
14	Elinor Purrier	New Hampshire	9:25.93	
15	Gina Sereno	Michigan	9:39.81	
	Makena Morley	Colorado	DNS	

==== 5000 meters ====
Rank	Name	University	Time	Notes
1st place, gold medalist(s)	Karissa Schweizer	Missouri	15:43.23	
2nd place, silver medalist(s)	Ednah Kurgat	New Mexico	15:47.46	
3rd place, bronze medalist(s)	Sharon Lokedi	Kansas	15:52.95	
4	Jessica Drop	Georgia	15:53.16	
5	Weini Kelati	New Mexico	15:56.73	
6	Erin Clark	Colorado	15:56.97	
7	Elly Henes	North Carolina St.	16:00.80	
8	Paige Stoner	Syracuse	16:05.88	
9	Alice Wright	New Mexico	16:07.66	
10	Grayson Murphy	Utah	16:10.26	
11	Amy Davis	Wisconsin	16:11.50	
12	Bethan Knights	California	16:18.51	
13	Alicia Monson	Wisconsin	16:19.45	
14	Clare O'Brien	Boise State	16:23.66	
15	Paige Gilchrist	Northern Arizona	16:38.42	
16	Makena Morley	Colorado	16:44.35	

==== 60 meter hurdles ====
- Final results shown, not prelims

Rank	Name	University	Time	Notes
1st place, gold medalist(s)	Payton Chadwick	Arkansas	7.93 (7.922)	PB
2nd place, silver medalist(s)	Anna Cockrell	USC	7.93 (7.926)	PB
3rd place, bronze medalist(s)	Jasmine Camacho-Quinn	Kentucky	7.96	
4	Cortney Jones	Florida State	8.02	PB
5	Kayla White	N. Carolina A&T	8.06	PB
6	Tara Davis	Georgia	8.14	
7	Tonea Marshall	LSU	8.17	
8	Janeek Brown	Arkansas	8.51	

==== 4 x 400 meters relay ====
Rank	University	Time	Notes
1st place, gold medalist(s)	USC	3:27.45	
2nd place, silver medalist(s)	Purdue	3:28.82	
3rd place, bronze medalist(s)	Florida	3:29.41	
4	Oregon	3:30.00	
5	Kentucky	3:30.08	
6	Texas A&M	3:31.64	
7	LSU	3:31.89	
8	Texas	3:33.06	
9	Iowa	3:33.19	
10	Clemson	3:33.44	
11	Ohio State	3:33.70	
12	Tennessee	3:33.79	
13	Oklahoma	3:34.58	
14	Duke	3:35.51	
15	Kansas	3:35.83	
16	Alabama	3:42.93	

==== Distance Medley Relay ====
Rank	University	Time	Notes
1st place, gold medalist(s)	Oregon	10:51.99	
2nd place, silver medalist(s)	Stanford	10:52.02	
3rd place, bronze medalist(s)	Virginia Tech	10:53.62	
4	Indiana	10:54.86	
5	Boise State	10:58.93	
6	Oklahoma State	11:04.65	
7	Eastern Michigan	11:04.81	
8	BYU	11:07.60	
9	Kansas	11:12.91	
10	New Mexico	11:13.21	
11	Clemson	11:31.41	
12	Notre Dame	11:40.06	

==== High Jump ====
Rank	Name	University	Height	Notes
1st place, gold medalist(s)	Nicole Greene	North Carolina	1.87 m (6 ft 1 1/2 in)	
2nd place, silver medalist(s)	Loretta Blaut	Cincinnati	1.87 m (6 ft 1 1/2 in)	PB
3rd place, bronze medalist(s)	Logan Boss	Miss State	1.87 m (6 ft 1 1/2 in)	
4	Zarriea Willis	Texas Tech	1.84 m (6 ft 1/4 in)	
5	Clarissa Cutliff	FIU	1.84 m (6 ft 1/4 in)	
6	Stacey Destin	Alabama	1.84 m (6 ft 1/4 in)	
7	Shelley Spires	Air Force	1.84 m (6 ft 1/4 in)	
8	Chelsie Decoud	Texas State	1.84 m (6 ft 1/4 in)	
9	Jordan Fields	South Carolina	1.81 m (5 ft 11 1/4 in)	
10	Alexus Henry	UT-Arlington	1.81 m (5 ft 11 1/4 in)	
10	Quamecha Morrison	Bethune-Cookman	1.81 m (5 ft 11 1/4 in)	
12	Madeline Fagan	Georgia	1.76 m (5 ft 9 1/4 in)	
12	Haleigh Knapp	Eastern Illinois	1.76 m (5 ft 9 1/4 in)	
14	Lissa Labiche	South Carolina	1.76 m (5 ft 9 1/4 in)	
15	Claire Kieffer-Wright	Michigan	1.76 m (5 ft 9 1/4 in)	
15	Andrea Stapleton	BYU	1.76 m (5 ft 9 1/4 in)	

==== Pole Vault ====
Rank	Name	University	Height	Notes
1st place, gold medalist(s)	Alexis Jacobus	Arkansas	4.66 m (15 ft 3 1/4 in)	PB CR
2nd place, silver medalist(s)	Victoria Hoggard	Arkansas	4.61 m (15 ft 1 1/4 in)	PB
3rd place, bronze medalist(s)	Olivia Gruver	Kentucky	4.51 m (14 ft 9 1/2 in)	
4	Lisa Gunnarsson	Virginia Tech	4.41 m (14 ft 5 1/2 in)	
5	Desiree Freier	Arkansas	4.41 m (14 ft 5 1/2 in)	PB
6	Laura Taylor	Kansas	4.36 m (14 ft 3 1/2 in)	
7	Lucy Bryan	Akron	4.36 m (14 ft 3 1/2 in)	
8	Madison Heath	Duke	4.31 m (14 ft 1 1/2 in)	PB
9	Maddie Gardner	West Virginia	4.31 m (14 ft 1 1/2 in)	
10	Lauren Martinez	California	4.21 m (13 ft 9 1/2 in)	
11	Rachel Baxter	Virginia Tech	4.21 m (13 ft 9 1/2 in)	
12	Karlie Place	Minnesota	4.21 m (13 ft 9 1/2 in)	
13	Kally Long	Texas	4.21 m (13 ft 9 1/2 in)	
14	Helen Falda	South Dakota	4.11 m (13 ft 5 3/4 in)	
15	Lindsey Murray	Ole Miss	4.11 m (13 ft 5 3/4 in)	
16	Bonnie Draxler	San Diego St.	4.11 m (13 ft 5 3/4 in)	

==== Long Jump ====
Rank	Name	University	Distance	Notes
1st place, gold medalist(s)	Kate Hall	Georgia	6.73 m (22 ft 3/4 in)	PB
2nd place, silver medalist(s)	Keturah Orji	Georgia	6.52 m (21 ft 4 1/2 in)	
3rd place, bronze medalist(s)	Tara Davis	Georgia	6.50 m (21 ft 3 3/4 in)	PB
4	Yanis David	Florida	6.42 m (21 ft 3/4 in)	
5	Jahisha Thomas	Iowa	6.40 m (20 ft 11 3/4 in)	
6	Darrielle McQueen	Florida	6.40 m (20 ft 11 3/4 in)	
7	Jhoanmy Luque	Iowa State	6.26 m (20 ft 6 1/4 in)	
8	Rougui Sow	South Carolina	6.25 m (20 ft 6 in)	
9	Payton Chadwick	Arkansas	6.14 m (20 ft 1 1/2 in)	
10	Marie-Josee Ebwea-Bile	Kentucky	6.10 m (20 ft 0 in)	
11	Nina Schultz	Kansas State	6.03 m (19 ft 9 1/4 in)	
12	Margaux Jones	USC	6.01 m (19 ft 8 1/2 in)	
13	Keishorea Armstrong	Binghamton	5.98 m (19 ft 7 1/4 in)	
14	Taliyah Brooks	Arkansas	5.95 m (19 ft 6 1/4 in)	
15	Alexis Gibbons	Louisville	5.85 m (19 ft 2 1/4 in)	
	Ayesha Champagnie	Minnesota	FOUL	

==== Triple Jump ====
Rank	Name	University	Distance	Notes
1st place, gold medalist(s)	Keturah Orji	Georgia	14.27 m (46 ft 9 3/4 in)	CR FR
2nd place, silver medalist(s)	Yanis David	Florida	13.97 m (45 ft 10 in)	
3rd place, bronze medalist(s)	Jessie Maduka	UCLA	13.81 m (45 ft 3 1/2 in)	PB
4	Jhoanmy Luque	Iowa State	13.68 m (44 ft 10 1/2 in)	PB
5	Sabina Allen	Campbell	13.61 m (44 ft 7 3/4 in)	PB
6	Marie-Josee Ebwea-Bile	Kentucky	13.51 m (44 ft 3 3/4 in)	
7	Lajarvia Brown	Texas A&M	13.39 m (43 ft 11 in)	PB
8	Jehvania Whyte	Northern Illinois	13.24 m (43 ft 5 1/4 in)	PB
9	Tiffany Flynn	Miss State	13.23 m (43 ft 4 3/4 in)	
10	Chaquinn Cook	Oregon	13.02 m (42 ft 8 1/2 in)	
11	Hanifah Abdulqadir	South Carolina	12.99 m (42 ft 7 1/4 in)	
12	Ciynamon Stevenson	Texas A&M	12.99 m (42 ft 7 1/4 in)	
13	Latavia Coombs	Kentucky	12.79 m (41 ft 11 1/2 in)	
14	Jakayla Hand	Auburn	12.57 m (41 ft 2 3/4 in)	
15	Angela Mercurio	Nebraska	12.38 m (40 ft 7 1/4 in)	
	Jahisha Thomas	Iowa	FOUL	

==== Shot Put ====
Rank	Name	University	Distance	Notes
1st place, gold medalist(s)	Maggie Ewen	Arizona State	18.49 m (60 ft 7 3/4 in)	
2nd place, silver medalist(s)	Emmonnie Henderson	Louisville	17.77 m (58 ft 3 1/2 in)	
3rd place, bronze medalist(s)	Jessica Woodard	Oklahoma	17.37 m (56 ft 11 3/4 in)	
4	Lloydricia Cameron	Florida	17.33 m (56 ft 10 1/4 in)	
5	Kiley Sabin	Minnesota	17.16 m (56 ft 3 1/2 in)	
6	Lena Giger	Stanford	17.14 m (56 ft 2 3/4 in)	
7	Ashlie Blake	UCLA	17.07 m (56 ft 0 in)	
8	Gleneve Grange	Florida State	17.00 m (55 ft 9 1/4 in)	
9	Breana Jemison	USC	16.57 m (54 ft 4 1/4 in)	
10	Aliyah Gustafson	Bowling Green	16.42 m (53 ft 10 1/4 in)	
11	Portious Warren	Alabama	16.14 m (52 ft 11 1/4 in)	
12	Sade Olatoye	Ohio State	16.12 m (52 ft 10 1/2 in)	
13	Stamatia Scarvelis	Tennessee	15.55 m (51 ft 0 in)	
14	Alyssa Wilson	UCLA	15.51 m (50 ft 10 1/2 in)	
15	Janeah Stewart	Ole Miss	15.40 m (50 ft 6 1/4 in)	
16	Banke Oginni	Wisconsin	14.50 m (47 ft 6 3/4 in)	

==== Weight Throw ====
Rank	Name	University	Distance	Notes
1st place, gold medalist(s)	Kaitlyn Long	Minnesota	23.30 m (76 ft 5 1/4 in)	FR
2nd place, silver medalist(s)	Annette Echikunwoke	Cincinnati	23.29 m (76 ft 4 3/4 in)	
3rd place, bronze medalist(s)	Janeah Stewart	Ole Miss	23.26 m (76 ft 3 1/2 in)	
4	Maggie Ewen	Arizona State	22.26 m (73 ft 1/4 in)	PB
5	Stamatia Scarvelis	Tennessee	22.17 m (72 ft 8 3/4 in)	
6	Sade Olatoye	Ohio State	22.14 m (72 ft 7 1/2 in)	
7	Sarah Loesch	Purdue	21.50 m (70 ft 6 1/4 in)	PB
8	Valarie Allman	Stanford	21.17 m (69 ft 5 1/4 in)	
9	Alison Ondrusek	Texas A&M	21.16 m (69 ft 5 in)	
10	Brooke Andersen	Northern Arizona	21.10 m (69 ft 2 1/2 in)	
11	Agnes Esser	Minnesota	20.89 m (68 ft 6 1/4 in)	
12	Banke Oginni	Wisconsin	20.69 m (67 ft 10 1/2 in)	
13	Ashley Bryant	Oklahoma	20.51 m (67 ft 3 1/4 in)	
14	Gabrielle Figueroa	Kent State	20.30 m (66 ft 7 in)	
15	Makenli Forrest	Louisville	19.96 m (65 ft 5 3/4 in)	
16	Nayoka Clunis	Minnesota	19.71 m (64 ft 7 3/4 in)	

==== Pentathlon ====
Rank	Name	University	Overall points	60 m H	HJ	SP	LJ	800 m
1st place, gold medalist(s)	Taliyah Brooks	Arkansas	4572	1118; 8.05	1029; 1.84 m (6 ft 1/4 in)	672; 12.16 m (39 ft 10 1/2 in)	962; 6.36 m (20 ft 10 1/4 in)	791; 2:22.44
2nd place, silver medalist(s)	Nina Schultz	Kansas State	4467	1064; 8.29	1029; 1.84 m (6 ft 1/4 in)	630; 11.53 m (37 ft 9 3/4 in)	915; 6.21 m (20 ft 4 1/4 in)	829; 2:19.58
3rd place, bronze medalist(s)	Georgia Ellenwood	Wisconsin	4381	1006; 8.55	953; 1.78 m (5 ft 10 in)	682; 12.31 m (40 ft 4 1/2 in)	837; 5.96 m (19 ft 6 1/2 in)	903; 2:14.28
4	Jaclyn Siefring	Akron	4365	980; 8.67	842; 1.69 m (5 ft 6 1/2 in)	709; 12.72 m (41 ft 8 3/4 in)	908; 6.19 m (20 ft 3 1/2 in)	926; 2:12.64
5	Louisa Grauvogel	Georgia	4318	1077; 8.23	916; 1.75 m (5 ft 8 3/4 in)	680; 12.29 m (40 ft 3 3/4 in)	828; 5.93 m (19 ft 5 1/4 in)	817; 2:20.51
6	Michelle Atherley	Miami	4257	1052; 8.34	879; 1.72 m (5 ft 7 1/2 in)	686; 12.38 m (40 ft 7 1/4 in)	768; 5.73 m (18 ft 9 1/2 in)	872; 2:16.47
7	Madeline Holmberg	Penn State	4216	1015; 8.51	736; 1.60 m (5 ft 2 3/4 in)	776; 13.73 m (45 ft 1/2 in)	883; 6.11 m (20 ft 1/2 in)	806; 2:21.26
8	Tyra Gittens	Texas A&M	4197	1050; 8.35	953; 1.78 m (5 ft 10 in)	717; 12.84 m (42 ft 1 1/2 in)	846; 5.99 m (19 ft 7 3/4 in)	631; 2:35.05
9	Amanda Froeynes	Florida	4160	961; 8.76	916; 1.75 m (5 ft 8 3/4 in)	580; 10.77 m (35 ft 4 in)	783; 5.78 m (18 ft 11 1/2 in)	920; 2:13.07
10	Stacey Destin	Alabama	4100	995; 8.60	953; 1.78 m (5 ft 10 in)	565; 10.54 m (34 ft 6 3/4 in)	789; 5.80 m (19 ft 1/4 in)	798; 2:21.92
11	Alissa Brooks-Johnson	Washington St.	4060	989; 8.63	842; 1.69 m (5 ft 6 1/2 in)	674; 12.20 m (40 ft 1/4 in)	759; 5.70 m (18 ft 8 1/4 in)	796; 2:22.07
12	Hope Bender	UC Santa Barbara	4010	1030; 8.44	771; 1.63 m (5 ft 4 in)	618; 11.34 m (37 ft 2 1/4 in)	726; 5.59 m (18 ft 4 in)	865; 2:17.01
13	Holly Hankenson	Louisville	4000	969; 8.72	806; 1.66 m (5 ft 5 1/4 in)	653; 11.88 m (38 ft 11 1/2 in)	709; 5.53 m (18 ft 1 1/2 in)	863; 2:17.14
14	Aaron Howell	Michigan	3997	931; 8.90	842; 1.69 m (5 ft 6 1/2 in)	703; 12.63 m (41 ft 5 in)	729; 5.60 m (18 ft 4 1/4 in)	792; 2:22.32
15	Shanice Cannigan	South Dakota	3943	991; 8.62	806; 1.66 m (5 ft 5 1/4 in)	595; 11.00 m (36 ft 1 in)	712; 5.54 m (18 ft 2 in)	839; 2:18.85
16	Selena Popp	Samford	3865	912; 8.99	842; 1.69 m (5 ft 6 1/2 in)	602; 11.10 m (36 ft 5 in)	771; 5.74 m (18 ft 9 3/4 in)	738; 2:26.42

=== Women's team scores ===
- Top 10 and ties shown

Rank	University	Team score
1st place, gold medalist(s)	Georgia	61 points
2nd place, silver medalist(s)	Arkansas	49 points
3rd place, bronze medalist(s)	Kentucky	34 points
4	Florida	32 points
5	Oregon	31 points
6	LSU	29 points
7	USC	28 points
8	Stanford	24 points
9	Missouri	20 points
10	New Mexico	17 points
10	Texas A&M	17 points

== See also ==
- NCAA Men's Division I Indoor Track and Field Championships
- NCAA Women's Division I Indoor Track and Field Championships
