= 2021 NCAA Division I Indoor Track and Field Championships =

College track and field competition

- Dates: March 11–13, 2021
- Host city: Fayetteville, Arkansas; University of Arkansas
- Venue: Randal Tyson Track Center
- Events: 34
- Participation: 650 selected athletes

The 2021 NCAA Division I Indoor Track and Field Championships were the 56th NCAA Division I Men's Indoor Track and Field Championships and the 39th NCAA Division I Women's Indoor Track and Field Championships, held at the Randal Tyson Track Center in Fayetteville, Arkansas near the campus of the host school, the University of Arkansas. In total, thirty-four different men's and women's indoor track and field events were contested from March 11 to March 13, 2021.

Because of the COVID-19 pandemic, the event was closed to the public.

== Streaming and TV coverage ==
ESPN3 live streamed the championships. On March 14, a replay of the championships was broadcast at 9:00 PM Eastern Time on ESPNU.

== Results ==
=== Men's results ===
==== 60 meters ====
- Final results shown, not prelims

Rank	Name	University	Time	Team score
1st place, gold medalist(s)	(United States) Micah Williams	Oregon	6.49	10
2nd place, silver medalist(s)	(Nigeria) Raymond Ekevwo	Florida	6.54	8
3rd place, bronze medalist(s)	(British Virgin Islands) Rikkoi Brathwaite	Indiana	6.56	6
4	(United States) Tavarius Wright	North Carolina A&T	6.64	5
5	(United States) Gaston Bouchereau	Oregon	6.65	4
6	(United States) Marcellus Moore	Purdue	6.65	3
7	(United States) Sterling Warner-Savage	Louisville	6.67	2
8	(United States) Brendon Stewart	USC	6.69	1

==== 200 meters ====
- Final results shown, not prelims

Rank	Name	University	Time	Team score
1st place, gold medalist(s)	(United States) Matthew Boling	Georgia	20.19	10
2nd place, silver medalist(s)	(United States) Terrance Laird	LSU	20.20	8
3rd place, bronze medalist(s)	(United States) Joseph Fahnbulleh	Florida	20.38	6
4	(United States) Javonte Harding	North Carolina A&T	20.39	5
5	(United States) Micaiah Harris	Texas	20.43	4
6	(United States) Lance Lang	Kentucky	20.88	3
7	(United States) Terryon Conwell	Clemson	21.09	2
8	(United States) Tyler Davis	Florida	21.44	1

==== 400 meters ====
- Final results shown, not prelims

Rank	Name	University	Time	Team score
1st place, gold medalist(s)	(United States) Noah Williams	LSU	44.71	10
2nd place, silver medalist(s)	(United States) Randolph Ross	North Carolina A&T	44.99	8
3rd place, bronze medalist(s)	(United States) Jacory Patterson	Virginia Tech	45.14	6
4	(United States) Ryan Willie	Florida	45.40	5
5	(United States) Bryce Deadmon	Texas A&M	45.54	4
6	(United States) Champion Allison	Alabama	45.79	3
7	(United States) Trevor Stewart	North Carolina A&T	45.83	2
8	(Trinidad and Tobago) Dwight St. Hillaire	Kentucky	45.89	1

==== 800 meters ====
- Final results shown, not prelims

Rank	Name	University	Time	Team score
1st place, gold medalist(s)	(Australia) Charles Hunter	Oregon	1:45.90	10
2nd place, silver medalist(s)	(United Kingdom) Finley McLear	Miami (OH)	1:45.91	8
3rd place, bronze medalist(s)	(Algeria) Takieddine Hedeilli	Texas Tech	1:46.84	6
4	(United States) Samuel Voelz	Notre Dame	1:47.62	5
5	(United States) Jason Gomez	Iowa State	1:48.06	4
6	(Jamaica) Ackeen Colley	Western Illinois	1:49.01	3
7	(United States) Kieran Taylor	Arkansas	1:50.79	2
8	(United States) Bashir Mosavel-Lo	Virginia Tech	1:51.83	1

==== Mile ====
- Final results shown, not prelims

Rank	Name	University	Time	Team score
1st place, gold medalist(s)	(United States) Cole Hocker	Oregon	3:53.71	10
2nd place, silver medalist(s)	(Kenya) Eliud Kipsang	Alabama	3:55.93	8
3rd place, bronze medalist(s)	(United States) Waleed Suliman	Ole Miss	3:57.26	6
4	(Australia) Adam Fogg	Drake	3:57.32	5
5	(United States) Reed Brown	Oregon	3:57.62	4
6	(United States) Sean Dolan	Villanova	3:57.91	3
7	(United Kingdom) Tom Dodd	Michigan	3:58.65	2
8	(United Kingdom) Yusuf Bizimana	Texas	3:59.55	1

==== 3000 meters ====
- Final results shown, not prelims

Rank	Name	University	Time	Team score
1st place, gold medalist(s)	(United States) Cole Hocker	Oregon	7:46.15	10
2nd place, silver medalist(s)	(United States) Cooper Teare	Oregon	7:46.23	8
3rd place, bronze medalist(s)	(Spain) Mario Garcia Romo	Ole Miss	7:48.59	6
4	(Kenya) Amon Kemboi	Arkansas	7:50.54	5
5	(United States) Alec Basten	Minnesota	7:52.05	4
6	(Tunisia) Ahmed Jaziri	Eastern Kentucky	7:53.19	3
7	(Iceland) Baldvin Magnusson	Eastern Michigan	7:53.72	2
8	(United States) Cameron Ponder	Furman	7:54.56	1

==== 5000 meters ====
- Final results shown, not prelims

Rank	Name	University	Time	Team score
1st place, gold medalist(s)	(Kenya) Wesley Kiptoo	Iowa State	13:23.77	10
2nd place, silver medalist(s)	(United States) Eric Hamer	Colorado State	13:29.60	8
3rd place, bronze medalist(s)	(United States) Morgan Beadlescomb	Michigan State	13:29.96	6
4	(South Africa) Adriaan Wildschutt	Florida State	13:30.55	5
5	(Germany) Aaron Bienenfeld	Cincinnati	13:31.65	4
6	(United States) Shea Foster	Southeastern Louisiana	13:32.38	3
7	(United States) Alec Basten	Minnesota	13:32.98	2
8	(United States) Ben Veatch	Indiana	13:33.50	1

==== 60 meter hurdles ====
- Final results shown, not prelims

Rank	Name	University	Time	Team score
1st place, gold medalist(s)	(Jamaica) Damion Thomas	LSU	7.51	10
2nd place, silver medalist(s)	(United States) Jamal Britt	Iowa	7.52	8
3rd place, bronze medalist(s)	(United States) Trey Cunningham	Florida State	7.53	6
4	(Jamaica) Phillip Lemonious	Arkansas	7.54	5
5	(United States) Eric Edwards Jr.	LSU	7.58	4
6	(Slovenia) Filip Demsar	South Carolina	7.74	3
7	(United States) Jesse Henderson	Mississippi State	7.77	2
8	(United States) Tre'Bien Gilbert	Arkansas	7.79	1

==== 4 × 400 meters relay ====
- Final results shown, not prelims

Rank	University	Time	Team score
1st place, gold medalist(s)	North Carolina A&T	3:03.16	10
2nd place, silver medalist(s)	Kentucky	3:03.61	8
3rd place, bronze medalist(s)	Tennessee	3:04.10	6
4	Georgia	3:04.84	5
5	Florida	3:06.31	4
6	Arkansas	3:06.35	3
7	Texas A&M	3:06.77	2
8	Texas	3:07.71	1

==== Distance medley relay ====
- Final results shown, not prelims

Rank	University	Time	Team score
1st place, gold medalist(s)	Oregon	9:19.98	10
2nd place, silver medalist(s)	Ole Miss	9:20.75	8
3rd place, bronze medalist(s)	Texas	9:23.73	6
4	North Carolina	9:25.80	5
5	Virginia Tech	9:27.67	4
6	Arkansas	9:33.65	3
7	Indiana	9:34.30	2
8	Miami (OH)	9:35.17	1

==== High jump ====
- Final results shown, not prelims

Rank	Name	University	Best Jump	Team score
1st place, gold medalist(s)	(United States) JuVaughn Harrison	LSU	2.30 m (7 ft 6 1/2 in)	10
2nd place, silver medalist(s)	(United States) Earnie Sears	USC	2.24 m (7 ft 4 in)	8
3rd place, bronze medalist(s)	(India) Tejaswin Shankar	Kansas State	2.24 m (7 ft 4 in)	6
4	(United States) Vernon Turner	Oklahoma	2.21 m (7 ft 3 in)	5
5	(United States) Corvell Todd	Southern Mississippi	2.21 m (7 ft 3 in)	4
6	(United States) Justin Stuckey	Samford	2.18 m (7 ft 1 3/4 in)	3
7	(United States) Brandon Burke	Buffalo	2.18 m (7 ft 1 3/4 in)	2
8	(United States) Bryson DeBerry	UT Arlington	2.18 m (7 ft 1 3/4 in)	1

==== Pole vault ====
- Final results shown, not prelims

Rank	Name	University	Best Jump	Team score
1st place, gold medalist(s)	(United States) KC Lightfoot	Baylor	5.93 m (19 ft 5 1/4 in)	10
2nd place, silver medalist(s)	(United States) Zach McWhorter	BYU	5.80 m (19 ft 1/4 in)	8
3rd place, bronze medalist(s)	(United States) Zach Bradford	Kansas	5.70 m (18 ft 8 1/4 in)	6
4	(Estonia) Eerik Haamer	South Dakota	5.60 m (18 ft 4 1/4 in)	5
5	(United States) Ethan Bray	South Dakota	5.50 m (18 ft 1/2 in)	4
6	(United States) Caleb Witsken	BYU	5.50 m (18 ft 1/2 in)	3
7	(United States) Clayton Fritsch	Sam Houston State	5.50 m (18 ft 1/2 in)	2
8	(United States) Hunter Garretson	Akron	5.40 m (17 ft 8 1/2 in)	1

==== Long jump ====
- Final results shown, not prelims

Rank	Name	University	Best Jump	Team score
1st place, gold medalist(s)	(United States) JuVaughn Harrison	LSU	8.45 m (27 ft 8 1/2 in)	10
2nd place, silver medalist(s)	(United States) Isaac Grimes	Florida State	8.35 m (27 ft 4 1/2 in)	8
3rd place, bronze medalist(s)	(Jamaica) Carey McLeod	Tennessee	8.26 m (27 ft 1 in)	6
4	(United States) Ja’Mari Ward	Missouri	8.11 m (26 ft 7 1/4 in)	5
5	(United States) Jeremiah Davis	Florida State	7.87 m (25 ft 9 3/4 in)	4
6	(Jamaica) Ryan Brown	Arkansas	7.83 m (25 ft 8 1/4 in)	3
7	(United States) Matthew Boling	Georgia	7.75 m (25 ft 5 in)	2
8	(United States) Jalen Seals	Texas Tech	7.74 m (25 ft 4 1/2 in)	1

==== Triple jump ====
- Final results shown, not prelims

Rank	Name	University	Best Jump	Team score
1st place, gold medalist(s)	(Italy) Emmanuel Ihemeje	Oregon	17.26 m (56 ft 7 1/2 in)	10
2nd place, silver medalist(s)	(Zimbabwe) Chengetayi Mapaya	TCU	16.95 m (55 ft 7 1/4 in)	8
3rd place, bronze medalist(s)	(Jamaica) Carey McLeod	Tennessee	16.93 m (55 ft 6 1/2 in)	6
4	(United States) Christian Edwards	Alabama	16.61 m (54 ft 5 3/4 in)	5
5	(United States) Sean Dixon-Bodie	LSU	16.59 m (54 ft 5 in)	4
6	(Jamaica) Owayne Owens	Virginia	16.53 m (54 ft 2 3/4 in)	3
7	(The Bahamas) Tamar Greene	Purdue	16.28 m (53 ft 4 3/4 in)	2
8	(Bulgaria) Georgi Nachev	Missouri	16.20 m (53 ft 1 3/4 in)	1

==== Shot put ====
- Final results shown, not prelims

Rank	Name	University	Best Throw	Team score
1st place, gold medalist(s)	(United States) Turner Washington	Arizona State	21.36 m (70 ft 3/4 in)	10
2nd place, silver medalist(s)	(United States) McKay Johnson	USC	20.19 m (66 ft 2 3/4 in)	8
3rd place, bronze medalist(s)	(United States) Alex Talley	North Dakota State	19.85 m (65 ft 1 1/4 in)	6
4	(United States) Daniel McArthur	North Carolina	19.84 m (65 ft 1 in)	5
5	(South Africa) Burger Lambrechts Jr.	Nebraska	19.83 m (65 ft 1/2 in)	4
6	(United States) Jordan West	Tennessee	19.66 m (64 ft 6 in)	3
7	(United States) John Meyer	Michigan	19.50 m (63 ft 11 1/2 in)	2
8	(United States) Maxwell Otterdahl	North Dakota State	19.43 m (63 ft 8 3/4 in)	1

==== Weight throw ====
- Final results shown, not prelims

Rank	Name	University	Best Throw	Team score
1st place, gold medalist(s)	(Norway) Thomas Mardal	Florida	24.46 m (80 ft 2 3/4 in)	10
2nd place, silver medalist(s)	(United States) Israel Oloyede	Arizona	23.79 m (78 ft 1/2 in)	8
3rd place, bronze medalist(s)	(United States) Manning Plater	Illinois	22.73 m (74 ft 6 3/4 in)	6
4	(United States) Trevor Otterdahl	North Dakota State	22.38 m (73 ft 5 in)	5
5	(United States) Bobby Colantonio	Alabama	22.27 m (73 ft 3/4 in)	4
6	(United States) Alex Talley	North Dakota State	22.25 m (72 ft 11 3/4 in)	3
7	(United States) Kaleb Siekmeier	Minnesota	22.22 m (72 ft 10 3/4 in)	2
8	(United States) Jake Wickey	Kent State	21.86 m (71 ft 8 1/2 in)	1

==== Heptathlon ====
- Final results shown, not prelims

Rank	Name	University	Overall points	60 m	LJ	SP	HJ	60 m H	PV	1000 m
1st place, gold medalist(s)	(Estonia) Karel Tilga	Georgia	6264	851; 7.09	965; 7.62 m (25 ft 0 in)	854; 16.04 m (52 ft 7 1/4 in)	859; 2.06 m (6 ft 9 in)	922; 8.24	898; 4.96 m (16 ft 3 1/4 in)	915; 2:36.32
2nd place, silver medalist(s)	(United States) Kyle Garland	Georgia	6200	851; 7.06	935; 7.50 m (24 ft 7 1/4 in)	815; 15.41 m (50 ft 6 1/2 in)	944; 2.15 m (7 ft 1/2 in)	964; 8.07	868; 4.86 m (15 ft 11 1/4 in)	813; 2:45.53
3rd place, bronze medalist(s)	(Puerto Rico) Ayden Owens	Michigan	5995	947; 6.82	900; 7.36 m (24 ft 1 3/4 in)	733; 14.07 m (46 ft 1 3/4 in)	749; 1.94 m (6 ft 4 1/4 in)	1014; 7.87	778; 4.56 m (14 ft 11 1/2 in)	873; 2:40.07
4	(Germany) Felix Wolter	Pittsburgh	5907	868; 7.04	955; 7.58 m (24 ft 10 1/4 in)	736; 14.13 m (46 ft 4 1/4 in)	776; 1.97 m (6 ft 5 1/2 in)	903; 8.32	868; 4.86 m (15 ft 11 1/4 in)	801; 2:46.66
5	(Greece) Alex Spyridonidis	Auburn	5863	847; 7.10	922; 7.45 m (24 ft 5 1/4 in)	696; 13.47 m (44 ft 2 1/4 in)	776; 1.97 m (6 ft 5 1/2 in)	910; 8.29	929; 5.06 m (16 ft 7 in)	783; 2:48.38
6	(Germany) Maximilian Vollmer	Oregon	5726	889; 6.98	840; 7.11 m (23 ft 3 3/4 in)	840; 15.82 m (51 ft 10 3/4 in)	670; 1.85 m (6 ft 3/4 in)	932; 8.20	837; 4.76 m (15 ft 7 1/4 in)	718; 2:54.63
7	(United States) Jacob Spotswood	Alabama	5715	819; 7.18	818; 7.02 m (23 ft 1/4 in)	703; 13.58 m (44 ft 6 1/2 in)	776; 1.97 m (6 ft 5 1/2 in)	886; 8.39	929; 5.06 m (16 ft 7 in)	784; 2:48.21
8	(United States) Denim Rogers	Houston Baptist	5653	893; 6.97	781; 6.86 m (22 ft 6 in)	620; 12.22 m (40 ft 1 in)	803; 2.00 m (6 ft 6 1/2 in)	989; 7.97	778; 4.56 m (14 ft 11 1/2 in)	789; 2:47.76

=== Men's team scores ===
- Top 10 and ties shown

Rank	University	Team score
1st place, gold medalist(s)	Oregon	79 points
2nd place, silver medalist(s)	LSU	56 points
3rd place, bronze medalist(s)	Georgia	35 points
4	Florida	34 points
5	North Carolina A&T	30 points
6	Florida State	23 points
7	Alabama	22 points
7	Arkansas	22 points
9	Tennessee	21 points
10	Ole Miss	20 points

=== Women's results ===
==== 60 meters ====
- Final results shown, not prelims

Rank	Name	University	Time	Team score
1st place, gold medalist(s)	(Jamaica) Kemba Nelson	Oregon	7.05	10
2nd place, silver medalist(s)	(United States) Twanisha Terry	USC	7.14	8
3rd place, bronze medalist(s)	(Jamaica) Kiara Grant	Norfolk State	7.16	6
4	(United States) Tamara Clark	Alabama	7.18	5
5	(United States) Alfreda Steele	Miami (FL)	7.22	4
6	(Antigua and Barbuda) Joella Lloyd	Tennessee	7.23	3
7	(United States) Jada Baylark	Arkansas	7.23	2
8	(Grenada) Halle Hazzard	Virginia	7.27	1

==== 200 meters ====
- Final results shown, not prelims

Rank	Name	University	Time	Team score
1st place, gold medalist(s)	(United States) Abby Steiner	Kentucky	22.38	10
2nd place, silver medalist(s)	(United States) Tamara Clark	Alabama	22.45	8
3rd place, bronze medalist(s)	(United States) Kynnedy Flannel	Texas	22.64	6
4	(United States) Twanisha Terry	USC	22.75	5
5	(United States) Anavia Battle	Ohio State	22.76	4
6	(Nigeria) Favour Ofili	LSU	22.96	3
7	(United States) Delecia McDuffie	North Carolina A&T	23.01	2
8	(United States) Amira Young	Minnesota	23.47	1

==== 400 meters ====
- Final results shown, not prelims

Rank	Name	University	Time	Team score
1st place, gold medalist(s)	(United States) Kaelin Roberts	USC	50.84	10
2nd place, silver medalist(s)	(United States) Athing Mu	Texas A&M	51.03	8
3rd place, bronze medalist(s)	(United States) Talitha Diggs	Florida	51.26	6
4	(Jamaica) Charokee Young	Texas A&M	51.41	5
5	(United Kingdom) Amber Anning	LSU	51.83	4
6	(United States) Tiana Wilson	Arkansas	52.02	3
7	(United States) Rosey Effiong	Arkansas	52.50	2
8	(United States) Kennedy Simon	Texas	52.69	1

==== 800 meters ====
- Final results shown, not prelims

Rank	Name	University	Time	Team score
1st place, gold medalist(s)	(United States) Aaliyah Miller	Baylor	2:00.69	10
2nd place, silver medalist(s)	(United States) Laurie Barton	Clemson	2:01.21	8
3rd place, bronze medalist(s)	(Saint Vincent and the Grenadines) Shafiqua Maloney	Arkansas	2:01.22	6
4	(United States) Lindsey Butler	Virginia Tech	2:02.15	5
5	(United States) Claire Seymour	BYU	2:02.25	4
6	(United States) Gabrielle Wilkinson	Florida	2:03.32	3
7	(United States) McKenna Keegan	Villanova	2:04.26	2
8	(United States) Sarah Hendrick	Kennesaw State	2:04.36	1

==== Mile ====
- Final results shown, not prelims

Rank	Name	University	Time	Team score
1st place, gold medalist(s)	(United States) Sage Hurta	Colorado	4:30.58	10
2nd place, silver medalist(s)	(United States) Krissy Gear	Arkansas	4:32.37	8
3rd place, bronze medalist(s)	(Canada) Kennedy Thomson	Arkansas	4:33.95	6
4	(United States) Kaley Richards	UMass Lowell	4:36.26	5
5	(United States) Allie Guagenti	Ohio State	4:36.71	4
6	(United States) Kate Hunter	BYU	4:37.65	3
7	(Poland) Aneta Konieczek	Oregon	4:38.46	2
8	(United States) Katie Rainsberger	Washington	4:39.67	1

==== 3000 meters ====
- Final results shown, not prelims

Rank	Name	University	Time	Team score
1st place, gold medalist(s)	(United States) Courtney Wayment	BYU	9:01.47	10
2nd place, silver medalist(s)	(United States) Lauren Gregory	Arkansas	9:01.67	8
3rd place, bronze medalist(s)	(Kenya) Joyce Kimeli	Auburn	9:02.79	6
4	(United States) Katie Izzo	Arkansas	9:03.85	5
5	(United States) Abby Gray	Arkansas	9:05.52	4
6	(United States) Jessica Drop	Georgia	9:05.98	3
7	(United States) Olivia Hoj	BYU	9:06.77	2
8	(Australia) Maudie Skyring	Florida State	9:09.05	1

==== 5000 meters ====
- Final results shown, not prelims

Rank	Name	University	Time	Team score
1st place, gold medalist(s)	(Kenya) Joyce Kimeli	Auburn	15:48.98	10
2nd place, silver medalist(s)	(United States) Bethany Hasz	Minnesota	15:49.62	8
3rd place, bronze medalist(s)	(United States) Elly Henes	NC State	15:49.86	6
4	(United States) Mahala Norris	Air Force	15:51.73	5
5	(United States) Abbey Wheeler	Providence	15:51.87	4
6	(United States) Grace Forbes	Rice	15:53.36	3
7	(United States) Jenna Magness	Michigan State	15:53.73	2
8	(United States) Hannah Steelman	NC State	15:55.65	1

==== 60 meter hurdles ====
- Final results shown, not prelims

Rank	Name	University	Time	Team score
1st place, gold medalist(s)	(Jamaica) Ackera Nugent	Baylor	7.92	10
2nd place, silver medalist(s)	(Jamaica) Daszay Freeman	Arkansas	7.99	8
3rd place, bronze medalist(s)	(United States) Chanel Brissett	Texas	8.01	6
4	(United States) Tiara McMinn	Miami (FL)	8.01	5
5	(United States) Milan Young	LSU	8.06	4
6	(United States) Mecca McGlaston	USC	8.07	3
7	(United States) Emily Sloan	Oregon	8.08	2
8	(Jamaica) Trishauna Hemmings	Clemson	8.16	1

==== 4 × 400 meters relay ====
- Final results shown, not prelims

Rank	University	Time	Team score
1st place, gold medalist(s)	Texas A&M	3:26.68	10
2nd place, silver medalist(s)	USC	3:27.91	8
3rd place, bronze medalist(s)	Arkansas	3:28.07	6
4	LSU	3:29.69	5
5	Kentucky	3:30.28	4
6	Florida	3:30.58	3
7	South Carolina	3:32.67	2
8	Baylor	3:33.27	1

==== Distance medley relay ====
- Final results shown, not prelims

Rank	University	Time	Team score
1st place, gold medalist(s)	BYU	10:52.96	10
2nd place, silver medalist(s)	Arkansas	10:57.19	8
3rd place, bronze medalist(s)	Florida State	10:59.16	6
4	Oklahoma State	10:59.75	5
5	Michigan	11:04.65	4
6	Florida	11:05.36	3
7	NC State	11:06.14	2
8	Ole Miss	11:07.18	1

==== High jump ====
- Final results shown, not prelims

Rank	Name	University	Best Jump	Team score
1st place, gold medalist(s)	(Trinidad and Tobago) Tyra Gittens	Texas A&M	1.90 m (6 ft 2 3/4 in)	10
2nd place, silver medalist(s)	(United States) Rachel Glenn	South Carolina	1.87 m (6 ft 1 1/2 in)	8
3rd place, bronze medalist(s)	(United States) Anna Hall	Georgia	1.87 m (6 ft 1 1/2 in)	6
4	(United States) Abigail O'Donoghue	LSU	1.84 m (6 ft 1/4 in)	5
5	(United States) Nissi Kabongo	Stephen F. Austin	1.84 m (6 ft 1/4 in)	4
6	(United States) Nyagoa Bayak	LSU	1.84 m (6 ft 1/4 in)	3
7	(United States) Lillian Lowe	Arizona	1.81 m (5 ft 11 1/4 in)	2
8	(United States) Morgan Smalls	USC	1.81 m (5 ft 11 1/4 in)	1

==== Pole vault ====
- Final results shown, not prelims

Rank	Name	University	Best Jump	Team score
1st place, gold medalist(s)	(Sweden) Lisa Gunnarsson	LSU	4.56 m (14 ft 11 1/2 in)	10
2nd place, silver medalist(s)	(United States) Kayla Smith	Georgia	4.41 m (14 ft 5 1/2 in)	8
3rd place, bronze medalist(s)	(United States) Sydney Horn	High Point	4.41 m (14 ft 5 1/2 in)	6
4	(United States) Rachel Baxter	Virginia Tech	4.36 m (14 ft 3 1/2 in)	5
5	(Greece) Ariadni Adamopoulou	Oklahoma State	4.36 m (14 ft 3 1/2 in)	4
6	(United States) Tuesdi Tidwell	Baylor	4.36 m (14 ft 3 1/2 in)	3
7	(United States) Samantha Van Hoecke	Kansas	4.36 m (14 ft 3 1/2 in)	2
8	(United States) Bailee McCorkle	Arkansas	4.36 m (14 ft 3 1/2 in)	1

==== Long jump ====
- Final results shown, not prelims

Rank	Name	University	Best Jump	Team score
1st place, gold medalist(s)	(United States) Tara Davis CR	Texas	6.93 m (22 ft 8 3/4 in)	10
2nd place, silver medalist(s)	(United States) Claire Bryant	Florida	6.70 m (21 ft 11 3/4 in)	8
3rd place, bronze medalist(s)	(Trinidad and Tobago) Tyra Gittens	Texas A&M	6.68 m (21 ft 10 3/4 in)	6
4	(United States) Aliyah Whisby	LSU	6.66 m (21 ft 10 in)	5
5	(Nigeria) Ruth Usoro	Texas Tech	6.62 m (21 ft 8 1/2 in)	4
6	(United States) Monae' Nichols	Texas Tech	6.49 m (21 ft 3 1/2 in)	3
7	(Jamaica) Taishia Pryce	Kansas State	6.48 m (21 ft 3 in)	2
8	(United States) Jasmine Moore	Georgia	6.40 m (20 ft 11 3/4 in)	1

==== Triple jump ====
- Final results shown, not prelims

Rank	Name	University	Best Jump	Team score
1st place, gold medalist(s)	(Nigeria) Ruth Usoro	Texas Tech	14.27 m (46 ft 9 3/4 in)	10
2nd place, silver medalist(s)	(Ghana) Deborah Acquah	Texas A&M	14.27 m (46 ft 9 3/4 in)	8
3rd place, bronze medalist(s)	(Latvia) Ruta Lasmane	Florida State	14.15 m (46 ft 5 in)	6
4	(United States) Jasmine Moore	Georgia	13.73 m (45 ft 1/2 in)	5
5	(The Bahamas) Charisma Taylor	Washington State	13.61 m (44 ft 7 3/4 in)	4
6	(Guyana) Natricia Hooper	Florida	13.53 m (44 ft 4 1/2 in)	3
7	(Canada) Mikeisha Welcome	Oklahoma	13.35 m (43 ft 9 1/2 in)	2
8	(United States) Euphenie Andre	Missouri	13.31 m (43 ft 8 in)	1

==== Shot put ====
- Final results shown, not prelims

Rank	Name	University	Best Throw	Team score
1st place, gold medalist(s)	(United States) Adelaide Aquilla	Ohio State	18.12 m (59 ft 5 1/4 in)	10
2nd place, silver medalist(s)	(United States) Samantha Noennig	Arizona	17.69 m (58 ft 1/4 in)	8
3rd place, bronze medalist(s)	(Netherlands) Jorinde Van Klinken	Arizona State	17.56 m (57 ft 7 1/4 in)	6
4	(United States) Essence Henderson	Virginia Tech	17.36 m (56 ft 11 1/4 in)	5
5	(United States) Akealy Moton	North Dakota State	17.31 m (56 ft 9 1/4 in)	4
6	(Jamaica) Gabrielle Bailey	Kent State	17.11 m (56 ft 1 1/2 in)	3
7	(United States) Madison Pollard	Indiana	16.99 m (55 ft 8 3/4 in)	2
8	(United States) Kayli Johnson	Texas Tech	16.98 m (55 ft 8 1/2 in)	1

==== Weight throw ====
- Final results shown, not prelims

Rank	Name	University	Best Throw	Team score
1st place, gold medalist(s)	(United States) Makenli Forrest	Louisville	23.26 m (76 ft 3 1/2 in)	10
2nd place, silver medalist(s)	(United States) Rachel Tanczos	Notre Dame	23.24 m (76 ft 2 3/4 in)	8
3rd place, bronze medalist(s)	(United States) Shey Taiwo	Ole Miss	22.94 m (75 ft 3 in)	6
4	(United States) Jasmine Mitchell	Ole Miss	22.89 m (75 ft 1 in)	5
5	(United States) Madi Malone	Auburn	22.16 m (72 ft 8 1/4 in)	4
6	(Canada) Camryn Rogers	California	22.08 m (72 ft 5 1/4 in)	3
7	(United States) Shauniece O'Neal	Southern Illinois	21.77 m (71 ft 5 in)	2
8	(United States) Rebecca Mammel	Michigan State	21.69 m (71 ft 1 3/4 in)	1

==== Pentathlon ====
- Final results shown, not prelims

Rank	Name	University	Overall points	60 m H	HJ	SP	LJ	800 m
1st place, gold medalist(s)	(Trinidad and Tobago) Tyra Gittens AR CR	Texas A&M	4746	1068; 8.27	1145; 1.93 m (6 ft 3 3/4 in)	785; 13.86 m (45 ft 5 1/2 in)	1083; 6.58 m (21 ft 7 in)	715; 2:28.22
2nd place, silver medalist(s)	(United States) Anna Hall	Georgia	4401	1032; 8.43	1067; 1.87 m (6 ft 1 1/2 in)	622; 11.41 m (37 ft 5 in)	762; 5.71 m (18 ft 8 3/4 in)	918; 2:13.19
3rd place, bronze medalist(s)	(United States) Erin Marsh	Duke	4344	1100; 8.13	879; 1.72 m (5 ft 7 1/2 in)	658; 11.95 m (39 ft 2 1/4 in)	850; 6.00 m (19 ft 8 in)	857; 2:17.53
4	(United States) Jadin O'Brien	Notre Dame	4296	1015; 8.51	842; 1.69 m (5 ft 6 1/2 in)	704; 12.64 m (41 ft 5 1/2 in)	816; 5.89 m (19 ft 3 3/4 in)	919; 2:13.13
5	(United States) Sterling Lester	Florida	4213	1030; 8.44	842; 1.69 m (5 ft 6 1/2 in)	654; 11.89 m (39 ft 0 in)	753; 5.68 m (18 ft 7 1/2 in)	934; 2:12.13
6	(United States) Annika Williams	Kentucky	4173	987; 8.64	997; 1.81 m (5 ft 11 1/4 in)	638; 11.65 m (38 ft 2 1/2 in)	795; 5.82 m (19 ft 1 in)	762; 2:24.59
7	(Latvia) Kristine Blazevica	Texas	4162	997; 8.59	842; 1.69 m (5 ft 6 1/2 in)	664; 12.04 m (39 ft 6 in)	816; 5.89 m (19 ft 3 3/4 in)	843; 2:18.59
8	(United States) G'Auna Edwards	Arkansas	4148	1044; 8.38	879; 1.72 m (5 ft 7 1/2 in)	554; 10.38 m (34 ft 1/2 in)	969; 6.38 m (20 ft 11 in)	702; 2:29.24

=== Women's team scores ===
- Top 10 and ties shown

Rank	University	Team score
1st place, gold medalist(s)	Arkansas	68 points
2nd place, silver medalist(s)	Texas A&M	57 points
3rd place, bronze medalist(s)	LSU	39 points
4	USC	35 points
5	Georgia	31 points
6	Florida	30 points
7	BYU	29 points
8	Texas	25 points
9	Baylor	24 points
10	Auburn	20 points

== See also ==
- National Collegiate Athletic Association (NCAA)
- NCAA Men's Division I Indoor Track and Field Championships
- NCAA Women's Division I Indoor Track and Field Championships
- 2021 NCAA Division I Outdoor Track and Field Championships
