= Brian Mondschein =

American-born Israeli pole vaulter (born 1983)

Brian Mondschein (Hebrew: בריאן מונדשיין; born 9 January 1983) is an American-born Israeli pole vaulter.

In the same year, he competed at the 2010 European Championships without reaching the final. His personal best jumps are 5.63 metres (indoor), achieved in May 2009 in Jonesboro, AR, and 5.60 metes (outdoor), achieved in July 2009 in Champaign, IL.

Mondschein's grandfather was Irving Mondschein, 3-time USA Outdoor Track and Field Championships winner in the decathlon. His uncle also named Brian Mondschein was an All-American decathlete in 1977 for the University of Washington and became a track coach.

Mondschein competed for the Virginia Tech Hokies track and field team, finishing 2nd in the pole vault at the 2005 NCAA Division I Outdoor Track and Field Championships.
