= Andy Trouard =

American distance runner

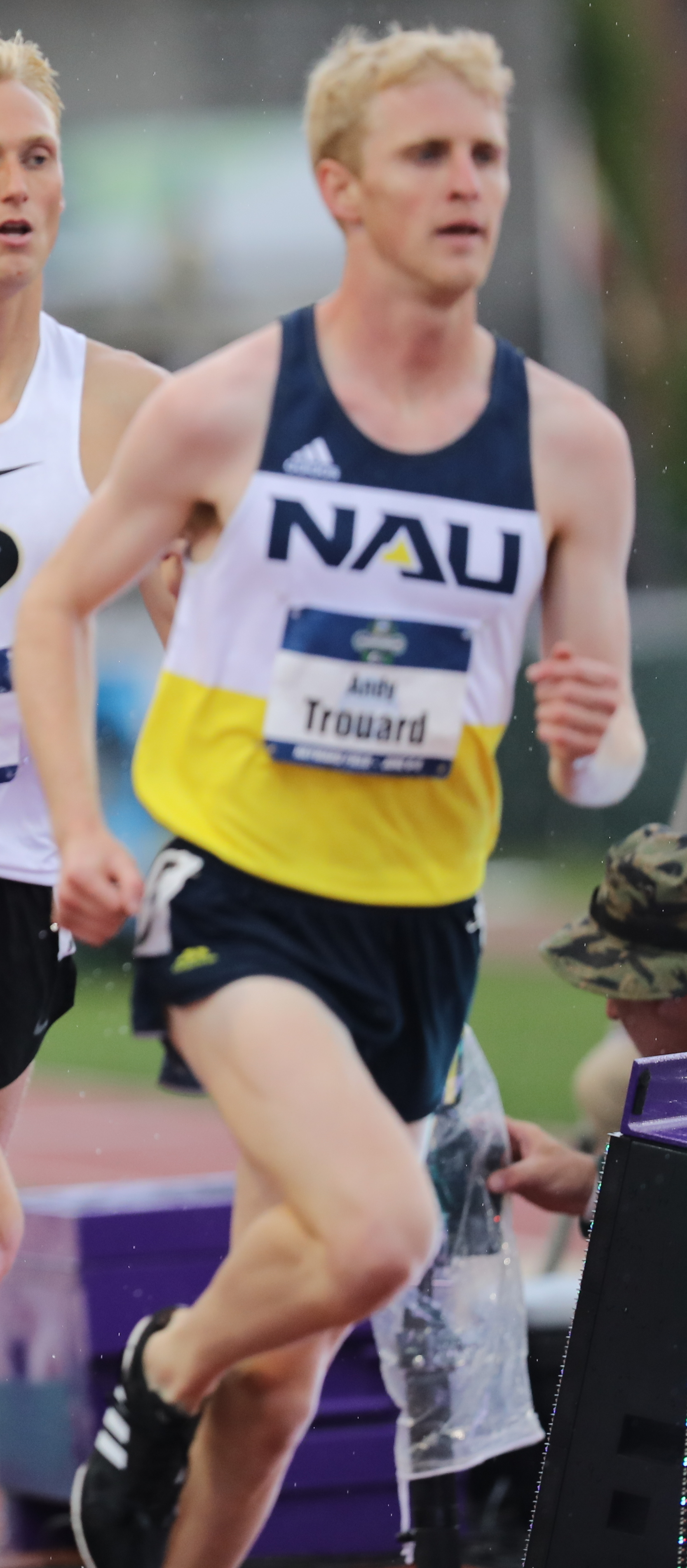
- Trouard at the 2018 NCAA Division I Outdoor Track and Field Championships

Personal information
- Nationality: American
- Born: April 22, 1994 (age 32)
- Education: Northern Arizona University
- Occupation: Professional Runner
- Years active: 2012 - Current

Sport
- Sport: Distance running
- Event: 5,000m
- College team: Northern Arizona University
- Club: Nike Oregon Track Club Elite
- Turned pro: 2018
- Coached by: Mark Rowland

Achievements and titles
- National finals: 2018 NCAA DI Indoor Track & Field Championships: 5,000 m, 5th 3,000 m, Gold; 2018 NCAA DI Outdoor Track & Field Championships: 1,500 m, 19th 2013 NCAA DI Cross Country Championships: 10,000 m, 200th 2016 NCAA DI Cross Country Championships: 10,000 m, 37th 2017 NCAA DI Cross Country Championships: 10,000 m, 35th
- Personal best(s): 800m: 1:53.97 (Alex Wilson, 2016); 1,500m: 3:38.96 (Bryan Clay, 2018); Mile: 3:58.01 (UW Invite, 2018); 3,000m: 7:48.21 (Iowa State, 2018); 5,000m: 13:21.07 (Payton Jordan, 2018); 8,000m: 23:27.9 (Louisville Classic, 2017); 10,000m: 29:58.1 (NCAA DI Champs, 2017)

Andy Trouard (born April 22, 1994) is a professional American Distance runner who competes in the 5000m for the Oregon Track Club Elite and has a personal best in the event of 13:21.07. In 2018, he won the NCAA Division I National Championship in the 3000m, won two team NCAA national championships in Cross Country with Northern Arizona University in 2016 and in 2017, and is an NCAA All-American in Track and Field.

== High school ==
=== Junior year ===
After winning two state swimming titles, Trouard decided to go out for Track & Field his junior year, his first time competitively running for his high school. During the season, he would win three state individual titles and quickly become one of the best runners in the state and still worked to develop as a runner.

==== Track & field ====
Trouard attended Salpointe Catholic High School, where he competed in track and field as a junior and senior, adding cross country in his senior year. In just year of running track, Trouard posted times of 1:54.54 in the 800m, 4:13.12 in the 1600m, and 9:23.21 in the 3200m. In the 2012 Arizona Division II State Championships he won at all three distance events, winning the 800m, the 1600m, and the 3200m.

Junior Year Track Results
| Meet | Date | Event | Time | Place |
|---|---|---|---|---|
| Ted James Invitational | March 3, 2012 | 800m | 2:05.64 | Gold |
| Ted James Invitational | March 3, 2012 | 1600m | 4:35.62 | Gold |
| Willie Williams Invitational | March 17, 2012 | 1600m | 4:21.64 | Bronze |
| Willie Williams Invitational | March 17, 2012 | 3200m | 9:38.64 | Gold |
| Chandler Rotary Invitatational | March 24, 2012 | 800m | 2:01.5 | 22nd |
| Chandler Rotary Invitatational | March 24, 2012 | Mile | 4:20.65 | Bronze |
| Scottsdale Distance Classic | March 30, 2012 | 3200m | 9:23.12 | Gold |
| Mario Castro Invitational | April 20, 2012 | 800m | 1:54.54 | Silver |
| Mario Castro Invitational | April 20, 2012 | 4 × 800 m | 8:42.70 | Bronze |
| Sabino Invitational | April 26, 2012 | 1600m | 4:18.22 | Gold |
| AIA Division II State Championships | May 9, 2012 | 800m | 1:56.46 | Gold |
| AIA Division II State Championships | May 9, 2012 | 1600m | 4:19.70 | Gold |
| AIA Division II State Championships | May 9, 2012 | 3200m | 9:25.89 | Gold |
| Arizona Meet of Champions | May 16, 2012 | 1600m | 4:13.12 | Gold |

===== 800m =====
After running his first 800m of the season at the Ted James Invitational and winning in a time of 2:05.64, he entered headed to the premier high school track and field meet in Arizona, the 73rd Chandler Rotary meet in Phoenix. In a field of 54 individuals, Trouard came in 22nd place, finishing a 2:01.50, a new personal best, but not fast enough to compete for a state title. About a month later, on April 20, Trouard raced at the Mario Castro Invitational verses Ryan Silva, who had run a 4:08 1600m just two weeks prior. Nearly lopping off seven seconds off his personal best, Trouard ran 1:54.54 and came second to Silva, who ran 1:53.65. This being his last 800m of the regular season, Trouard had proved his capabilities and was ready for the state championship. He won the race by the small margin of 0.11 seconds. Trouard had two other races he had to compete in during the state championships, the 1600m and 3200m.

2012 AIA DII Track & Field State Championship 800m Final Results
| Place | Time | Name | Grade | School | Medal |
|---|---|---|---|---|---|
| 1 | 1:56.46 | Andy Trouard | 11 | Salpointe Catholic | Gold |
| 2 | 1:56.57 | Ethan Hohman | 11 | Cactus Shadows | Silver |
| 3 | 1:57.14 | Goch Ajak | 12 | Peoria | Bronze |
| 4 | 1:58.43 | Tyler Dink | 11 | Verrado | |
| 5 | 1:59.34 | Ian Stoddard | 11 | Sunrise Mountain | |

===== 1600m =====
2012 AIA DII Track & Field State Championship 1600m Final Results
| Place | Time | Name | Grade | School | Medal |
|---|---|---|---|---|---|
| 1 | 4:19.70 | Andy Trouard | 11 | Salpointe Catholic | Gold |
| 2 | 4:21.25 | Chris Lessard | 12 | Maricopa | Silver |
| 3 | 4:22.22 | Goch Ajak | 12 | Peoria | Bronze |
| 4 | 4:22.70 | Ethan Hohman | 11 | Cactus Shadow | |
| 5 | 4:25.50 | Adrian Ortega | 10 | Vista Grande | |

===== 3200m =====
2012 AIA DII Track & Field State Championship 3200m Final Results
| Place | Time | Name | Grade | School | Medal |
|---|---|---|---|---|---|
| 1 | 9:25.89 | Andy Trouard | 11 | Salpointe Catholic | Gold |
| 2 | 9:30.15 | Eduardo Roa | 12 | McClintock | Silver |
| 3 | 9:30.68 | John Winfield | 12 | Ironwood Ridge | Bronze |
| 4 | 9:45.81 | Jordan Hellebuyck | 10 | Canyon Del Oro | |
| 5 | 9:51.67 | Ethan Hohman | 11 | Cactus Shadow | |

=== Senior year ===
==== Cross country ====
In the fall of his senior year, Trouard decided to compete in cross country and ran a season best of 14:59.3 for 5,000m during his sectional race. This time would rank him sixteenth in the nation for the 5,000m and earn him the school record for the distance. The record was broken two years later by his teammate, Nathan Thompson, who ran 14:54.0 on the same course; Thompson would go on to run for the Air Force Academy. The next week, Trouard competed in the Arizona Division II Cross Country Championships and won by seventeen seconds in a time of 16:02.0 over the 5,000m distance. Two weeks after the state championship, Trouard raced in the Nike Cross Regional South race and placed seventh in a time of 15:09.0 for 5,000m and would qualify him for Nike Cross Nationals (NXN) as an individual. At NXN placed 29th in a time of 17:53.0, forty-seven seconds behind the National Champion, Sam Wharton.

Senior Year Cross Country Results
| Meet | Date | Event | Time | Pace/Mile | Place |
|---|---|---|---|---|---|
| Cigna Cross Country Festival | September 1, 2012 | 3 Mile | 15:00.60 | | Silver |
| Four Corners Invitational | September 15, 2012 | 5000m | 15:21.20 | | Gold |
| Desert Twilight Festival | September 28, 2012 | 5000m | 15:24.41 | | Silver |
| Rattler Invitational | October 6, 2012 | 5000m | 15:31.60 | | Gold |
| Doug Conley Invitational | October 13, 2012 | 5000m | 15:36.48 | | Gold |
| AIA Division II Section II Championships | October 27, 2012 | 5000m | 14:59.30 | | Gold |
| AIA Division II State Championships | November 3, 2012 | 5000m | 16:01.98 | | Gold |
| Nike Cross Regionals Southwest | November 17, 2012 | 5000m | 15:09.00 | | 7th |
| Nike Cross Nationals | December 1, 2012 | 5000m | 17:53.00 | | 29th |

2012 AIA DII State Cross Country Championships Results
| Place | Time | Name | Grade | School | Medal |
|---|---|---|---|---|---|
| 1 | 16:02.0 | Andy Trouard | 12 | Salpointe Catholic | Gold |
| 2 | 16:19.5 | Adrian Ortega | 11 | Vista Grande | Silver |
| 3 | 16:27.1 | Harvey Nelson | 11 | Catalina Foothills | Bronze |
| 4 | 16:29.0 | Ethan Hohman | 12 | Cactus Shadow | |
| 5 | 16:33.0 | Jack Hovalnd | 11 | Notre Dame Prep | |

==== Track & field ====
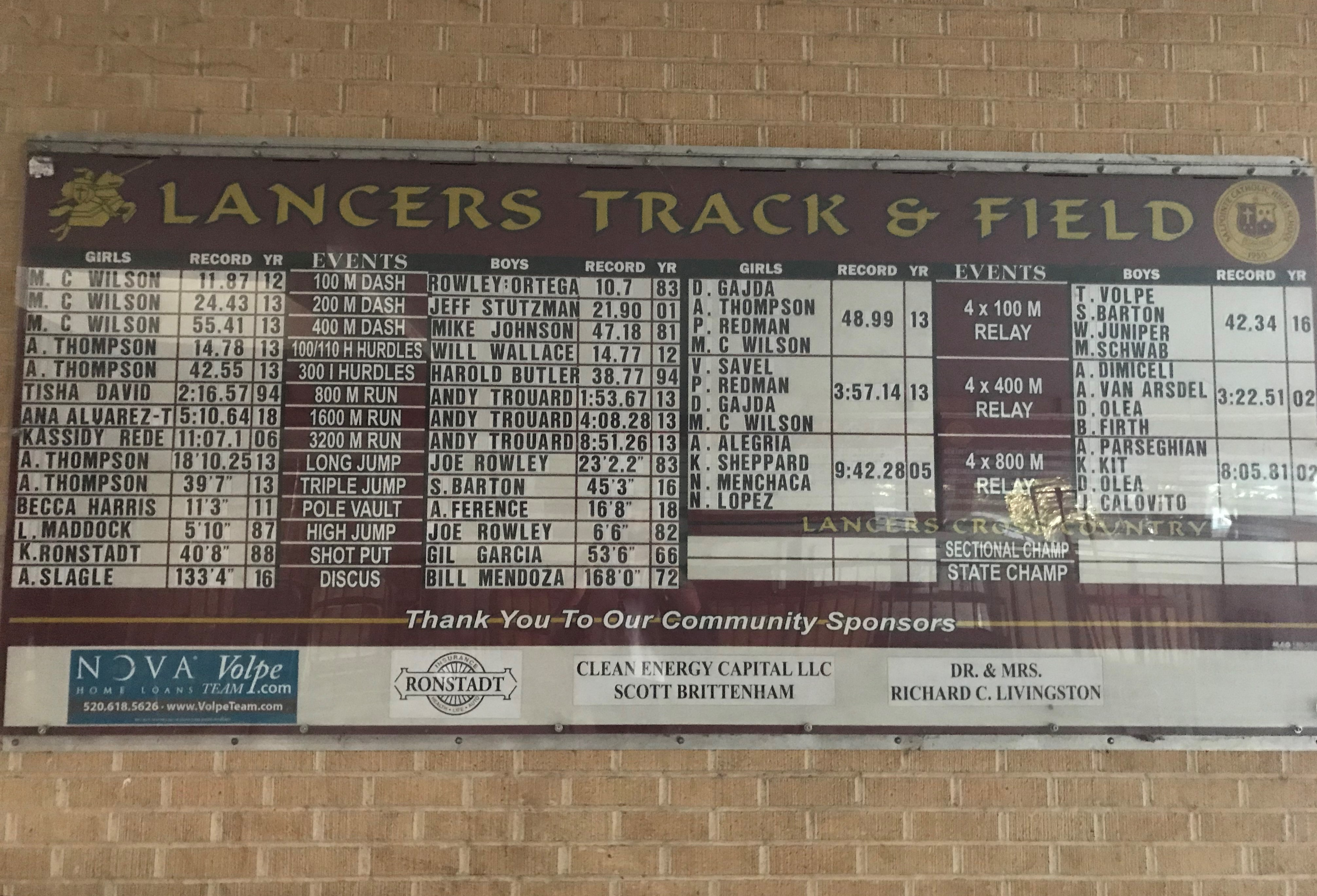
Trouard's records on display at Salpointe Catholic High School (center of image)

Despite having a superb season time-wise, Trouard did not compete in the Division II State Championships. He set three new school records: 1:53.67 in the 800m; 4:08.28 in the 1600m; and 8:51.26 in the 3200m (see image to right).

Senior Year Track Results
| Meet | Date | Event | Time | Place |
|---|---|---|---|---|
| Ted James Invitational | March 2, 2013 | 800m | 2:01.21 | Gold |
| Ted James Invitational | March 2, 2013 | 1600m | 4:18.15 | Gold |
| Willie Williams Classic | March 14–16, 2013 | 3200m | 9:03.81 | Gold |
| Chandler Rotary Invitational | March 22–23, 2013 | 1600m split | 4:08.28 | N/A |
| Chandler Rotary Invitational | March 22–23, 2013 | Mile | 4:09.71 | Gold |
| Scottsdale Distance Classic | March 28, 2013 | 800m | 1:53.67 | Gold |
| Arcadia Invitational | April 5–6, 2013 | 3200m | 8:51.26 | 7th |
| Mt. SAC Relays | April 18–20, 2013 | Mile | 4:10.91 | Bronze |

Salpointe Catholic's All Time Track Leaders
| | 800m | | | 1600m | | | 3200m | | |
|---|---|---|---|---|---|---|---|---|---|
| Rank | Time | Name | Year | Time | Name | Year | Time | Name | Year |
| 1 | 1:53.67e | Andy Trouard | 2013 | 4:08.28e | Andy Trouard | 2013 | 8:51.26e | Andy Trouard | 2013 |
| 2 | 1:54.52e | Dave Hohman | 2001 | 4:16.34e | Bryce Livingston | 2006 | 9:13.72e | Joe Urbanski | 1997 |
| 3 | 1:54.73e | Dan Maher | 1998 | 4:18.90e | Joe Urbanski | 1998 | 9:20.1 | Rob Rezetko | 1985 |
| 4 | 1:56.49e | Steve Kurtz | 1984 | 4:23.38e | Nathan Thomas | 2014 | 9:29.76e | Nathan Thomas | 2015 |
| 5 | 1:56.68e | Bryce Livingston | 2006 | 4:25.17e | Jason Colavito | 2003 | 9:35.59e | Bryce Livingston | 2005 |

===== 800m =====
The 800m not being Trouard's strongest event, he ran two during the regular season and clocked a modest 2:01.21 and a 2:06.21. It wasn't until the state championship until Trouard turned up the speed and ran a 1:53.67, which was a winning time, beating out second place by 0.53 seconds. This time earned him the school record, overshadowing the previous record holder Dave Hohman whose record had stood for twelve years, with a time of 1:54.52.

===== 1600m =====
With new newfound running success on the national stage, Trouard came back for track in the Spring. After a disappointing season opener in the 1600m, running a time of 4:18.15 at the Ted James Invite, he ran well at the first large meet of the year, the 73rd Chandler Rotary meet. In the Varsity Mile, Trouard ran a time of 4:09.71 for the full mile and a 1600m split of 4:08.28. This broke the previous school record of 4:16.34 set by Bryce Livingston in 2006 and would rank him the eleventh fastest miler in the nation by the end of the season.

===== 3200m =====
After running a new school record of 9:03.81 for the 3200m,essentially all alone at the Willie Williams Classic, breaking Joe Urbanski's sixteen-year-old record of 9:13.72, Trouard headed to the Arcadia Invitational. The race is famously fast 3200m because it attracts many of the top two-milers in the nation. This race allowed him to race with the best in the nation and prove himself. At the meet, Trouard placed seventh and ran 8:51.26 for 3200m, demolishing his previous record. This time launched to the seventh ranked spot in the nation and eighth by the end of the season.

2013 High School 3200m National Rankings
| Rank | Time | Name | Grade | School |
|---|---|---|---|---|
| 1 | 8:45.74 | Ben Saarel | 12 | Park City |
| 2 | 8:46.07 | Sean McGorty | 12 | Chantilly |
| 3 | 8:47.07 | Bernie Montoya | 12 | Cibola |
| 4 | 8:48.58 | Blake Haney | 11 | Stockdale |
| 5 | 8:48.73 | Jacob Thomson | 12 | Lou. Holy Cross |
| 6 | 8:50.74 | Jack Keelan | 12 | Chicago (St. Ignatius Prep) |
| 7 | 8:51.01 | Joe Hardy | 11 | Seattle Prep |
| 8 | 8:51.26 | Andy Trouard | 12 | Salpointe Catholic |
| 9 | 8:51.75 | Brock Baker | 12 | Oakland |
| 10 | 8:52.65 | Christian Freeman | 12 | Carlsbad |

== College ==
=== College bests ===
During his time at NAU, Trouard posted some of the best times in the NCAA during the ten seasons he competed in, the majority of which were run in invitational races. In the 2018 indoor season, Trouard had the NCAA indoor lead in the 3000m with a time of 7:48.21 which he ran at the Iowa State Classic where he beat Grant Fisher by 0.35 seconds to secure the win and the NCAA lead. the same year, Trouard was ranked 11th in the 1500m outdoors with a time of 3:41.40. Also, in 2018, Trouard was ranked second in the NCAA in the 5000m during the outdoor season with a time of 13:21.07, only behind Justyn Knight who both ran their season records in the same race, the Jordan Payton Invitational.

Track Bests
| Event | Time | Meet | Date |
|---|---|---|---|
| 800m | 1:53.97 | Alex Wilson Invitational | February 20, 2016 |
| 1500m | 3:41.40 | Bryan Clay Invitational | April 19–20, 2018 |
| Mile | 3:58.01 | UW Invitational | January 26–27, 2018 |
| 3000m | 7:48.21 | Iowa State Classic | February 9–10, 2018 |
| 5000m | 13:21.07 | Payton Jordan Invitational | May 3, 2018 |

Cross Country Bests
| Event | Time | Meet | Date |
|---|---|---|---|
| 4.25 mi | 22:08.1 | Dave Murray Invitational | September 20, 2013 |
| 4.5 mi | 23:02.8 | George Kyte Classic | September 2, 2017 |
| 8k | 23:27.9 | Louisville Classic | September 30, 2017 |
| 10k | 29:58.1 | NCAA DI National Championships | November 18, 2017 |

=== Freshman year ===
Coming into NAU in 2013, Trouard was listed as their top freshman recruit. During high school he had run times of 1:53.67 in the 800m, 4:08.28 in the 1600m, and 8:51.26 for the 3200m and was ranked among the top in the nation.

==== Cross country ====
2013 Cross Country Results*
| Meet | Date | Distance | Time | Pace/Mile | Place |
|---|---|---|---|---|---|
| George Kyte Classic | September 7, 2013 | 8k | 25:21.5 | 5:06 | 6th |
| Dave Murray Invitational | September 20, 2013 | 4.25 mi | 22:08.1 | 5:13 | 4th |
| Cowboy Jamboree | September 28, 2013 | 8k | 25:06.0 | 5:03 | 14th |
| Wisconsin Adidas Invitational | October 19, 2013 | 8k | 23:57.0 | 4:49 | 43rd |
| NCAA DI Mountain Regional | November 15, 2013 | 10k | 30:21.7 | 4:53 | 40th |
| NCAA DI National Championships | November 23, 2013 | 10k | 32:17.6 | 5:12 | 200th |

==== Indoor track ====
2014 Indoor Track Results*
| Meet | Date | Event | Time | Place |
|---|---|---|---|---|
| Lumberjack Team Challenge | January 17, 2014 | 3000m | 8:38.08 | Gold |
| Mountain T's Invitational | February 7–8, 2014 | Mile | 4:16.17 | 5th |
| Iowa State | February 14–15, 2014 | Mile | 4:03.89 | 9th |
| NAU Last Chance Meet | February 21, 2014 | 800m | 1:55.39 | Gold |
| Big Sky Indoor Track & Field Championships | February 17 - March 1, 2014 | Mile | 4:16.98 | 6th |
| Big Sky Indoor Track & Field Championships | February 17 - March 1, 2014 | 3000m | 8:36.45 | 7th |
| Big Sky Indoor Track & Field Championships | February 17 - March 1, 2014 | DMR | 10:07.13 | Silver |
| Willie Williams Classic | March 21–22, 2014 | 800m | 1:54.66 | 4th |
| Stanford Invitational | April 4–5, 2014 | 5000m | 13:56.95 | Bronze |
| Bryan Clay Invitational | April 18, 2014 | 1500m | 3:56.61 | 61st |
| Double Dual Meet UA/ASU/NAU | May 3, 2014 | 1500m | 3:49.87 | 6th |

==== Outdoor track ====
Trouard did not compete during the outdoor season because of an Achilles injury which took many months to rehabilitate. During this time, Trouard was contemplating returning to swimming in the form of Triathlons and began communication with triathlon recruiters before returning to running full-time.

=== Sophomore year ===
==== Cross country ====
Trouard did not compete during the Cross Country season as he was continuing rehabilitation on his Achilles (see "Outdoor Track" under 2.1.3 for more information).

==== Indoor track ====
2015 Indoor Track Results*
| Meet | Date | Event | Time | Place |
|---|---|---|---|---|
| UC Irvine Steve Scott Invite | May 1–2, 2015 | 5000m | 14:34.60 | 10th |
| Mountain T's Invitational | January 29–30, 2016 | Mile | 4:22.11 | Bronze |
| Iowa State Classic | February 12–13, 2016 | Mile | 4:05.99 | 27th |
| Alex Wilson Invitational | February 20, 2016 | 800m | 1:53.97 | 13th |
| Alex Wilson Invitational | February 20, 2016 | DMR | 9:39.19 | 13th |
| Big Sky Championships | February 25–27, 2016 | 800m (Prelim) | 2:00.64 | 8th |
| Big Sky Championships | February 25–27, 2016 | 800m (Final) | 1:57.22 | 8th |
| Big Sky Championships | February 25–27, 2016 | Mile | 4:14.57 | Bronze |

==== Outdoor track ====
2016 Outdoor Track Results*
| Meet | Date | Event | Time | Place |
|---|---|---|---|---|
| Stanford Invitational | April 1–2, 2016 | 5000m | 14:19.23 | 17th |
| Jim Click Shootout | April 9, 2016 | 1500m | 3:47.85 | Bronze |
| Jim Click Shootout | April 9, 2016 | 3000m | 8:49.94 | Silver |
| Bryan Clay Invitational | April 14–15, 2016 | 5000m | 14:13.02 | 13th |
| Cal State Fullerton 5-Way | April 30, 2016 | 1500m | 3:49.65 | Gold |
| Cal State Fullerton 5-Way | April 30, 2016 | 5000m | 14:59.88 | Gold |
| Big Sky Championships | May 11–14, 2016 | 1500m | 3:50.50 | Gold |
| Big Sky Championships | May 11–14, 2016 | 5000m | 15:12.87 | 6th |
| NCAA DI West Preliminary Round | May 26–18, 2016 | 1500m | 3:43.61 | 5th |
| NCAA DI Championships | June 8–11, 2016 | 1500m | 3:50.42 | 19th |

=== Junior year ===
==== Cross country ====
2016 Cross Country Results*
| Meet | Date | Distance | Time | Pace/Mile | Place |
|---|---|---|---|---|---|
| George Kyte Classic | September 3, 2016 | 4.5 mi | 23:16.7 | 5:10 | 6th |
| Sycamore Cross Country Invitational | September 10, 2016 | 8k | 25:27.7 | 5:07 | 5th |
| Nuttycombe Wisconsin Invitational | October 14, 2016 | 8k | 24:33.0 | 4:56 | 44th |
| Big Sky Conference Championship | October 28, 2016 | 8k | 24:32.0 | 4:56 | 5th |
| NCAA DI Mountain Region Championship | November 11, 2016 | 10k | 31:48.5 | 5:07 | 36th |
| NCAA DI National Championship | November 19, 2016 | 10k | 30:23.5 | 4:53 | 37th |

==== Indoor track ====
2017 Indoor Track Results*
| Meet | Date | Event | Time | Place |
|---|---|---|---|---|
| Lumberjack Team Challenge | January 21, 2017 | 3000m | 8:44.43 | Bronze |
| Mountain T's Invitational | February 3–4, 2017 | 800m | 1:56.26 | Silver |
| Mountain T's Invitational | February 3–4, 2017 | Mile | 4:10.2 | Gold |
| Iowa State Classic | February 10–11, 2017 | Mile | 4:00.81 | Gold |
| Big Sky Championships | February 23–25, 2017 | Mile | 4:10.31 | Silver |
| Big Sky Championships | February 23–25, 2017 | 3000m | 8;20.93 | Bronze |
| Big Sky Championships | February 23–25, 2017 | DMR | 10:04.77 | Silver |

==== Outdoor track ====
2017 Outdoor Track Results*
| Meet | Date | Event | Time | Place |
|---|---|---|---|---|
| USATF Championships | June 22–15, 2017 | 1500m | 3:48.33 | 32nd |
| USATF Championships | June 22–15, 2017 | 5000m | 13:49.19 | 11th |

=== Senior year ===
==== Cross country ====
2017 Cross Country Results*
| Meet | Date | Distance | Time | Pace/Mile | Place |
|---|---|---|---|---|---|
| George Kyte Classic | September 2, 2017 | 4.5 mi | 23:02.8 | 4:38 | Bronze |
| Louisville Classic | September 30, 2017 | 8k | 23:27.9 | 4:43 | Bronze |
| Nuttycombe Wisconsin Invitational | October 13, 2017 | 8k | 23:40.9 | 4:46 | Bronze |
| Big Sky Conference Championship | October 28, 2017 | 8k | 23:58.7 | 4:49 | Bronze |
| NCAA DI Mountain Region Championship | November 10, 2017 | 10k | 30:45.9 | 4:57 | 18th |
| NCAA DI National Championship | November 18, 2017 | 10k | 29:58.1 | 4:49 | 35th |

==== Indoor track ====
2018 Indoor Track Results*
| Meet | Date | Event | Time | Place |
|---|---|---|---|---|
| UW Invitational | January 26–27, 2018 | Mile | 3:58.01 | Silver |
| Iowa State Classic | February 9–10, 2018 | 3000m | 7:48.21 | Gold |
| Big Sky Championships | February 22–24, 2018 | Mile | 4:13.30 | Silver |
| Big Sky Championships | February 22–24, 2018 | 3000m | 8:41.44 | 6th |
| Big Sky Championships | February 22–24, 2018 | 5000m | 14:20.54 | Gold |
| NCAA DI Championships | March 9–10, 2018 | 3000m | 8:04.94 | Gold |
| NCAA DI Championships | March 9–10, 2018 | 5000m | 14:16.39 | 5th |

==== Outdoor track ====
2018 Outdoor Track Results*
| Meet | Date | Event | Time | Place |
|---|---|---|---|---|
| Bryan Clay Invitational | April 19–20, 2018 | 1500m | 3:41.40 | 23rd |
| Payton Jordan Invitational | May 3, 2018 | 5000m | 13:21.07 | 6th |
| Big Sky Championships | May 8–11, 2018 | 1500m (Prelim) | 3:57.19 | Bronze |
| Big Sky Championships | May 8–11, 2018 | 1500m (Final) | 3:49.22 | Gold |
| Big Sky Championships | May 8–11, 2018 | 5000m | 14:12.82 | Bronze |
| NCAA West Preliminary Round | March 24–26, 2018 | 5000m | 13:47.86 | Bronze |
| NCAA DI Championships | June 6–9, 2018 | 5000m | 13:55.46 | 4th |

===== Footnotes =====
* = Track & Field Results Reporting System
