= Selig Hirsch Mondschein =

Selig Hirsch Mondschein (Hebrew: זעליג צבי מאנדשיין, romanized: Zelig Tsevi Mondshain; 1812 – 23 October 1872) was a Galician Hebrew-language writer, translator and educator. He was born in Bolechow, and worked as a teacher in Jarosław.

== Selected publications ==
- "Ha-pose'a al shtei ha-se'aeifim". Kokhve Yitsḥaḳ. 3. Vienna: 41–44. 1847. Translation of "Erster Gesang" by Christoph August Tiedge.
- Amude ha-olam. Lemberg. 1861. Containing an admonishment of his Jewish contemporaries for neglecting childhood education and for venerating superstition over knowledge.
- Imre yosher. Lemberg. 1862. Essays and poetic reflections. Reprinted from Kokhve Yitsḥaḳ.
- Gorel ha-tzedakah. Lemberg. 1864. A dialogue between Virtue (צדקה) and Vice (תאווה).
- Leshon ḥakhamim. Vol. 1. Lemberg. 1866. Religious-philosophical and rhetorical studies.
- Imre noam. Lemberg. 1872. Speeches and ethical reflections.
