= Alex Bloom =

English professor and pioneer (1895–1955)

Alexander Abraham Bloom (1895 in Stepney, London – 1955 in Stepney, London) was an English pioneer of radical state education. Alex Bloom was the headmaster of St George-in-the-East Secondary School in Stepney, London.

Alex Bloom was opposed to the contemporary education system and stated that he aspired to

"A consciously democratic community … without regimentation, without corporal punishment, without competition". Bloom rejected the use of prizes for achievement in "work, conduct or sport," instead believing in a more co-operative approach to learning. During an era in which corporal punishment was common in schools, Bloom effectively dispensed with the use of punishment all together, stating "Our only form of punishment, if punishment it can be called, is a request to the child to leave the group." He believed that the best approach to resolving anti-social behaviour in children was to contact the parents in order to find out the reason.

Alex Bloom was portrayed in the 1959 novel To Sir, With Love. The book, later a film, is an account by E.R. Braithwaite of his time teaching at St-George-in-the-East Secondary School. Bloom appears as the character Florian. The school building still stands. It has been converted into flats.
