= Irving Mondschein =

American decathlete and football player (1924–2015)

Personal information
- Born: February 7, 1924 Brooklyn, New York, United States
- Died: June 5, 2015 (aged 91) Hershey, Pennsylvania, United States

Sport
- Sport: Athletics
- Event: Decathlon
- University team: New York University

Irving "Moon" Mondschein (February 7, 1924 – June 5, 2015) was an American track and field athlete and college football player and coach. Mondschein is best known for his accomplishments in track and field, winning two NCAA high jump titles and competing in the decathlon in the 1948 London Olympics.

== Personal life ==
Mondschein, who was Jewish, was born in Brooklyn. He attended Boys High School, where he ran track. He also ran for the New York Pioneer Club. He entered the US Army in 1943. He became a member of the Pi Lambda Phi fraternal organization while attending New York University His son, Brian, was a world-class decathlete in the 1980s. His grandson, also named Brian, was an All-American pole vaulter at Virginia Tech.

== Decathlon, high jump, and football career ==
Mondschein was AAU decathlon champion in 1944, and in 1946 and 1947. He won the 1944 Olympic trials and would have been the top American representative had the Olympic Games been held that year. He was NCAA high jump champion in both 1947 and 1948, competing for New York University. As of 2015, he still held NYU's record in the outdoor high jump—6 feet, 7¾ inches. He also played college football as an end for NYU in 1946, earning All-East honors. He competed in the 1948 Summer Olympics for the United States in decathlon, coming in eighth, as teammate Bob Mathias won the gold medal. In his career, he was ranked third in the world in outdoor high jump and tenth in the decathlon in 1947; sixth in the indoor high jump and eighth in the decathlon in 1948; and third in the outdoor high jump and sixth in the decathlon in 1949.

== Coaching career ==
Mondschein later coached track, basketball, and football at Lincoln University in Oxford, Pennsylvania, starting in 1949. He coached the US track and field team at the 1950 Maccabiah Games, which included Olympian Henry Laskau (national champion and world record holder) who won a gold medal in racewalking, and was also an advisor to the Israeli Ministry of Education, helping for two years to prepare the country's athletes for the 1952 Olympics. Irv was also athletic coach (Track) at Lawrence High School, Cedarhurst, NY ( Nassau County) from 1956-65. He was then a coach at the University of Pennsylvania; first the assistant track coach (1965–79) and then the head coach (1979–87). He was also an assistant coach on the 1988 U.S. Olympic team. He was previously an assistant coach at Kutztown University of Pennsylvania, and also volunteered as an assistant coach at Haverford College. He also served as an assistant coach at La Salle University in Philadelphia.

== Honors ==
Mondschein is a member of the Philadelphia Jewish Sports Hall of Fame, the New York Jewish Sports Hall of Fame, and the National Jewish Sports Hall of Fame. He is also a member of the NYU Athletics Hall of Fame, and the U.S. Track & Field and Cross-Country Coaches Association Hall of Fame.

== Head coaching record ==
=== Football ===
Year	Team	Overall	Conference	Standing	Bowl/playoffs
Lincoln Lions (Colored Intercollegiate Athletic Association) (1949–1950)
1949	Lincoln	3–5	2–4	13th	
1950	Lincoln	3–3–1	2–3–1	9th	
Lincoln:		6–8–1	4–7–1		
Total:		6–8–1			
