= Kate Hunter =

Professor of history in New Zealand

Kathryn Hunter
- Born: 1969

Academic background
- Education: University of Melbourne
- Thesis: Dutiful daughters and 'father's right-hand man': single white women in rural Victoria, 1880s to the 1920s (1998)

Kathryn McKerral Hunter is an Australian–New Zealand academic historian, and is a full professor at the Victoria University of Wellington, specialising in the 19th and 20th century history of New Zealand and Australia, with a particular focus on the social history of the First World War, and the history of hunting in New Zealand. From 2017 until 2022 she was the director of the Stout Centre for New Zealand Studies.

== Academic career ==
Hunter completed a Bachelor of Arts with Honours and a PhD titled Dutiful daughters and 'father's right-hand man': single white women in rural Victoria, 1880s to the 1920s at the University of Melbourne. Hunter moved to New Zealand in 1995, and joined the faculty of Victoria University of Wellington. She was the Director of the Stout Centre for New Zealand Studies from 2017 to 2022, and has been Head of the History Programme. Hunter was appointed as a full professor in 2020. Hunter is an Honorary Research Associate at Te Papa Tongarewa.

Hunter is interested in gender and race relations, and has written or co-authored books on the social history of the First World War, hunting in New Zealand, and women on Australian family farms. Her interest in hunting arose due to marrying a hunter, and finding it confronting to encounter people with guns in New Zealand national parks, a situation that would not happen in Australia. She describes hunting as central to the culture and colonisation of New Zealand. She has also researched Middle Eastern cultural influences in Australasia. In her inaugural professorial lecture, delivered in 2023, she reflected on the craft of being a historian, and how seemingly trivial pieces of information could direct historical enquiry.

== Selected works ==
=== Authored and co-authored books ===
- Kate Hunter and Kirstie Ross. (2014) Holding on to Home: New Zealand Stories and Objects of the First World War. Te Papa Press. ISBN 9780987668851
- Kathryn M. Hunter. (2009) Hunting: A New Zealand History. Random House, Auckland, New Zealand ISBN 9781869791544
- Kathryn M. Hunter. (2004) Father’s Right-Hand Man: Women on Australia’s Family Farms, 1880s to the 1920s. Australian Scholarly Pub. ISBN 9781740970303

=== Journal articles ===
- Kathryn M. Hunter (2012). "New Zealand Hunters in Africa: At the Edges of the Empire of Nature". The Journal of Imperial and Commonwealth History. 40 (3): 483–501. doi:10.1080/03086534.2012.712418. Wikidata Q58545865.
- Kathryn Hunter (2017). "National and Imperial Belonging in Wartime: The Tangled Knot of Australians and New Zealanders as British Subjects during the Great War". Australian Journal of Politics and History. 63 (1): 31–44. doi:10.1111/ajph.12321. Wikidata Q126173806.
- Kathryn Hunter (2007). "'Sleep on dear Ernie, your battles are o'er': A Glimpse of a Mourning Community, Invercargill, New Zealand, 1914-1925". War in History. 14 (1): 36–62. doi:10.1177/0968344507071040. Wikidata Q126173823.
- Kathryn M. Hunter (2019). "Furs in early twentieth-century New Zealand: ecology, war and fashion to the 1930s". History of Retailing and Consumption. 5 (2): 133–149. doi:10.1080/2373518x.2019.1611164. Wikidata Q126173799.
- Kathryn M. Hunter; Emma Ward (2021). "An open window: women's work in the women's press in the aftermath of the First World War". First World War Studies. 12 (1): 17–33. doi:10.1080/19475020.2021.1986415. Wikidata Q126173788.
