= Hanna Green =

American middle-distance runner

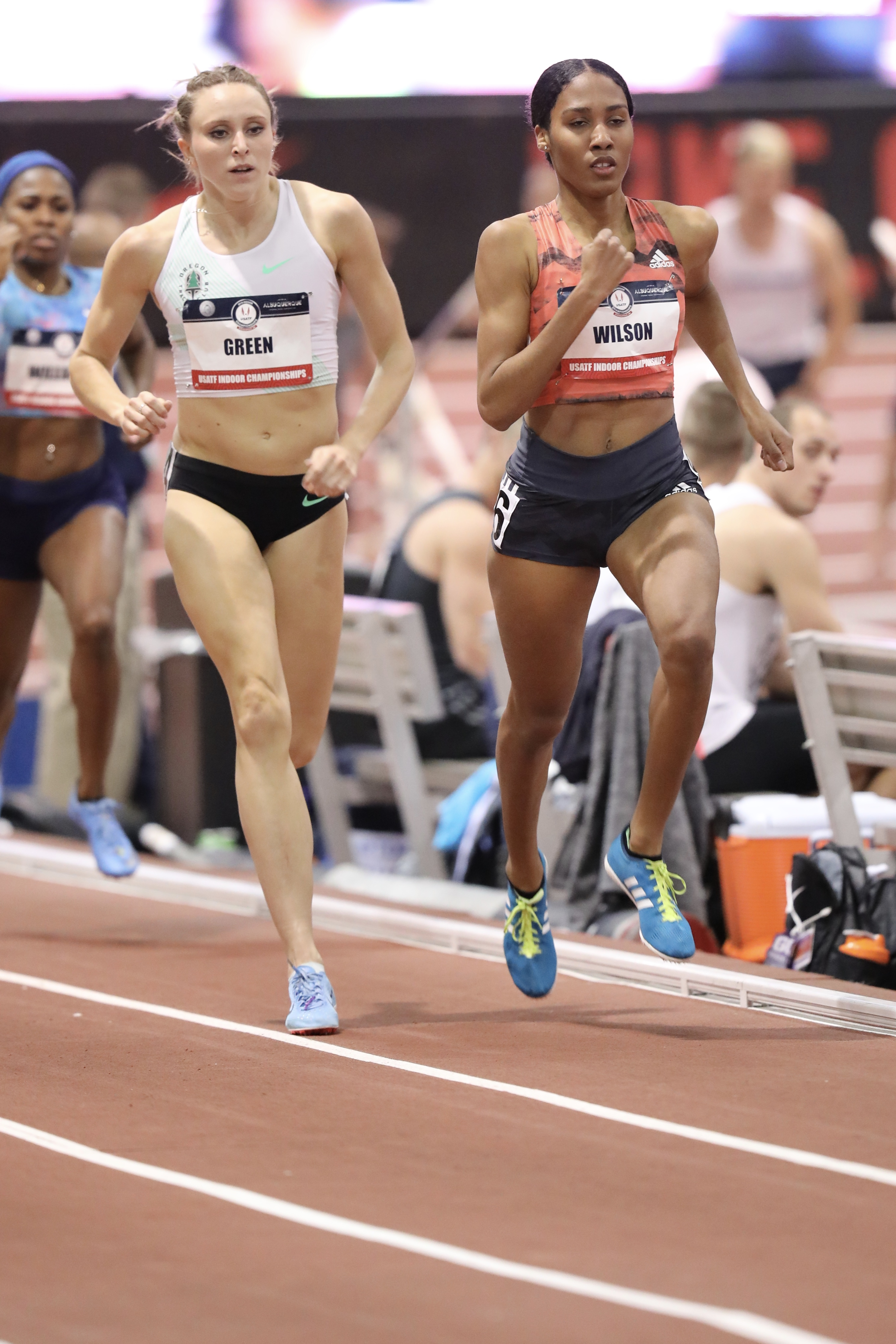
- Green (left) in 2018

Personal information
- Born: October 16, 1994 (age 32) Latrobe, Pennsylvania, U.S.
- Height: 5 ft 9 in (175 cm)

Sport
- Sport: Track
- Events: 800 meters, 1500 meters
- College team: Virginia Tech Hokies
- Turned pro: 2017

Achievements and titles
- Personal bests: 800 meters: 1:58.19 1500 meters: 4:06.66 Mile: 4:28.06

Hanna Green (born October 16, 1994) is an American track and field athlete, known for middle-distance races, primarily 800 meters.

== Biography ==
Green went to high school at Greater Latrobe Senior High School in Latrobe, Pennsylvania. There she primarily ran 400 meters with a personal best of 55.93 from her junior year. She finished fifth then fourth at the PIAA state championships her last two years there 2012 and 2013. Next she ran for Virginia Tech, where she moved up in distance to the 800 meters and even broke 5 minutes for the mile her freshman year. In her sophomore year she moved her personal best to 2:01.17, which got her third place at the 2015 NCAA Championships. After missing the finals in 2016, she moved up to second place in 2017. Raevyn Rogers won those championships all three years. The 2:01:17 remained her collegiate PB. Indoors she finished second in 2016 and 2017 again behind Rogers. After college, in 2018 she moved her PB down to 2:00.09 while finishing seventh at the 2018 National Championships. Earlier in 2018, she finished fifth at the Indoor Championships.

2019 proved to be her breakthrough year. First she finished second in the 1000 meters at the Indoor Championships in 2:35.40. Then she broke 2 minutes in the 800 at the Prefontaine Classic and broke 1:59 at the same time running 1:58.75 to finish fourth in the international field. A month later she improved again to 1:58.19 while taking second at the 2019 National Championships, beating Rogers in the process. That also qualified her in the 2019 World Athletics Championships. She backed that up by winning the IAAF Diamond League Meeting de Paris in 1:58.39.
