= Lindsey Butler =

American middle-distance runner (born 2000)

- Lindsey Butler at the Wanda Diamond League’s 2026 Weltklasse Zürich.

Personal information
- Born: 28 August 2000 (age 26)

Sport
- Sport: Athletics
- Event: Middle-distance running

Achievements and titles
- Personal bests: 800m: 2:01.23 (2022); 1500m: 4:06.28 (2025); Mile: 4:25.85 (2025)

Lindsey Butler (born 28 August 2000) is an American middle-distance runner. She won the 2022 NCAA Indoor Championships over 800 metres, and placed third at the 2026 USA Indoor Championships over 1500 metres.

== Early and personal life ==
From Corning, New York, she attended Corning-Painted Post High School. Butler is from a family of athletes. Her grandfather was a pole vaulter at the University of Maryland, where he was the first ever ACC champion in track and field and later worked as a coach. Her father was a pole vaulter and decathlete at the University of Maryland and her sister also ran track at college. She began running in the junior year of high school having previously focused on lacrosse. Butler attended Virginia Tech, graduating with a degree in Engineering and a master's degree in information technology.

== Career ==
Competing for Virginia Tech, Butler placed fourth placed fourth in the 800 meters at the 2021 NCAA Indoor Championships. That summer, Butler finished in sixth place for first-team All-American in the 800 m, her first outdoor NCAA meet, at the 2021 NCAA Outdoor Championships.

The following year, she won the 800 metres title at the 2022 NCAA Indoor Championships in March 2022 in Birmingham, Alabama, running 2:01.37. In doing so, she became only the second woman from the Atlantic Coast Conference (ACC) to win the indoor 800 m title, after Natoya Goule in 2015. At the ACC Championships that year she had set an NCAA-best time of 2:01.23 to enter the race as the number one seed.

In 2026, Butler placed third overall over 1500 metres at the 2026 USA Indoor Track and Field Championships behind Nikki Hiltz and Gracie Morris, in 4:11.52, having attacked hard at the front of the race with two laps remaining. On 3 July, Butler placed third over 1500 metres at the 2026 Prefontaine Classic. Butler won the Monument Mile Classic in a meeting record of 4:26.60 in Stirling, Scotland, in September 2026.
