= Deakin Volz =

American pole vaulter (born 1997)

Personal information
- Born: June 5, 1997 (age 29)

Sport
- Country: United States
- Event: Pole vault
- College team: Virginia Tech
- Coached by: Dave Volz

Achievements and titles
- Personal best: Outdoor: 5.65 m (18 ft 6 1/4 in) (2016)
Medal record
World U20 Championships
Gold medal – first place	2016 Bydgoszcz	Pole vault

Deakin Volz (born May 6, 1997) is an American track and field athlete, known for pole vault, though he has also had success in the high jump. He is the 2016 World U20 (Junior) champion, where he jumped a personal best of 5.65 m (18 ft 6 1/4 in) in Bydgoszcz, Poland. Deakin comes from a family line of vaulters as his brothers Drake and Drew are also pole vaulters. They are all coached by their father, 1992 Olympian Dave Volz, made famous for inventing his now-banned namesake technique of replacing the crossbar while still in the air.

Deakin and his brothers vault for Bloomington High School South, where Deakin is the two time Indiana state champion, winning in 2015, his senior year by over a foot. After graduating, Deakin competed for Virginia Tech from 2015 to 2019, while his older brothers jumped for their father's alma mater, hometown Indiana. After finishing his college career, he became a coach at Virginia Tech.
