= Penn State Nittany Lions track and field =

College track and field team

- University: Penn State University
- Head coach: John Gondak
- Conference: Big Ten
- Location: State College, Pennsylvania
- Outdoor track: Nittany Lion Track
- Nickname: Nittany Lions
- Colors: Blue and white

The Penn State Nittany Lions track and field team is the track and field program that represents Penn State University. The Nittany Lions compete in NCAA Division I as a member of the Big Ten Conference. The team is based in State College, Pennsylvania at Nittany Lion Track.

The program is coached by John Gondak. The track and field program officially encompasses four teams because the NCAA considers men's and women's indoor track and field and outdoor track and field as separate sports.

Sprinter Barney Ewell is the only Penn State athlete to have won four individual national championships, over the 100 meters and 200 meters in 1940 and 1941.

== Postseason ==
=== AIAW ===
The Nittany Lions have had 20 AIAW All-Americans finishing in the top six at the AIAW indoor or outdoor championships.

AIAW All-Americans
Championships	Name	Event	Place
1976 Outdoor	Kris Bankes	1500 meters	2nd
1976 Outdoor	Kris Bankes	2 miles	3rd
1976 Outdoor	Liz Berry	3 miles	5th
1977 Outdoor	Kris Bankes	3000 meters	5th
1977 Outdoor	Lisa Turner	4 × 880 yards relay	5th
1977 Outdoor	Peggy Hall	4 × 880 yards relay	5th
1977 Outdoor	Lea Ventura	4 × 880 yards relay	5th
1977 Outdoor	Kris Bankes	4 × 880 yards relay	5th
1978 Outdoor	Kathy Mills	3000 meters	1st
1978 Outdoor	Kris Bankes	3000 meters	2nd
1978 Outdoor	Kathy Mills	5000 meters	1st
1978 Outdoor	Kathy Byrnes	4 × 800 meters relay	5th
1978 Outdoor	Sandy Miller	4 × 800 meters relay	5th
1978 Outdoor	Penny Fales	4 × 800 meters relay	5th
1978 Outdoor	Lea Ventura	4 × 800 meters relay	5th
1980 Indoor	Mary Rawe	2000 meters	2nd
1980 Indoor	Peggy Cleary	5000 meters	5th
1980 Indoor	Heather Carmichael	5000 meters	6th
1980 Indoor	Mary Rawe	Distance medley relay	5th
1980 Indoor	Debbie Lewis	Distance medley relay	5th
1980 Indoor	Penny Fales	Distance medley relay	5th
1980 Indoor	Heather Carmichael	Distance medley relay	5th
1980 Outdoor	Mary Rawe	1500 meters	5th
1980 Outdoor	Heather Carmichael	3000 meters	3rd
1980 Outdoor	Heather Carmichael	3000 meters	3rd
1981 Indoor	Mary Rawe	3000 meters	3rd
1981 Indoor	Kathy Mills	5000 meters	4th
1981 Indoor	Penny Fales	Distance medley relay	4th
1981 Indoor	Tammie Hart	Distance medley relay	4th
1981 Indoor	Doreen Startare	Distance medley relay	4th
1981 Indoor	Mary Rawe	Distance medley relay	4th
1981 Indoor	Elaine Sobansky	Shot put	5th
1981 Outdoor	Terry Pioli	800 meters	6th
1981 Outdoor	Mary Rawe	1500 meters	3rd
1981 Outdoor	Elaine Sobansky	Shot put	4th
1982 Indoor	Terry Pioli	880 yards	6th
1982 Indoor	Patty Murnane	Mile run	5th
1982 Indoor	Doreen Startare	Distance medley relay	5th
1982 Indoor	Tammie Hart	Distance medley relay	5th
1982 Indoor	Patty Murnane	Distance medley relay	5th
1982 Indoor	Carolyn Thrig	Distance medley relay	5th
1982 Indoor	Vivian Riddick	Long jump	5th
1982 Indoor	Elaine Sobansky	Shot put	3rd

=== NCAA ===
As of 2024, a total of 98 men and 50 women have achieved individual first-team All-American status at the Division I men's outdoor, women's outdoor, men's indoor, or women's indoor national championships (using the modern criteria of top-8 placing regardless of athlete nationality).

First team NCAA All-Americans
Team	Championships	Name	Event	Place	Ref.
Men's	1921 Outdoor	John Romig	3000 meters	1st	
Men's	1922 Outdoor	Harold Barron	220 yards hurdles	5th	
Men's	1922 Outdoor	Harold Barron	110 meters hurdles	1st	
Men's	1922 Outdoor	Alan Helffrich	800 meters	1st	
Men's	1922 Outdoor	Lawrence Shields	Mile run	1st	
Men's	1922 Outdoor	Schuyler Enck	3000 meters	4th	
Men's	1922 Outdoor	Mike Palm	Hammer throw	2nd	
Men's	1923 Outdoor	Alan Helffrich	800 meters	1st	
Men's	1923 Outdoor	Schuyler Enck	800 meters	3rd	
Men's	1923 Outdoor	Schuyler Enck	Mile run	1st	
Men's	1923 Outdoor	Mike Palm	Hammer throw	6th	
Men's	1930 Outdoor	Charles Meisinger	3000 meters	5th	
Men's	1938 Outdoor	Nick Vukmanic	Javelin throw	1st	
Men's	1939 Outdoor	Nick Vukmanic	Javelin throw	4th	
Men's	1940 Outdoor	Barney Ewell	100 meters	1st	
Men's	1940 Outdoor	Barney Ewell	200 meters	1st	
Men's	1940 Outdoor	Nick Vukmanic	Javelin throw	4th	
Men's	1941 Outdoor	Barney Ewell	100 meters	1st	
Men's	1941 Outdoor	Barney Ewell	200 meters	1st	
Men's	1947 Outdoor	Gerry Karver	Mile run	1st	
Men's	1947 Outdoor	Curt Stone	3000 meters	2nd	
Men's	1947 Outdoor	Horace Ashenfelter	3000 meters	6th	
Men's	1947 Outdoor	Floyd Lang	Javelin throw	6th	
Men's	1948 Outdoor	Horace Ashenfelter	5000 meters	2nd	
Men's	1949 Outdoor	Jim Gehrdes	220 yards hurdles	2nd	
Men's	1949 Outdoor	Jim Gehrdes	110 meters hurdles	3rd	
Men's	1949 Outdoor	Bert Lancaster	200 meters	6th	
Men's	1949 Outdoor	Horace Ashenfelter	3000 meters	1st	
Men's	1950 Outdoor	Jim Gehrdes	110 meters hurdles	6th	
Men's	1951 Outdoor	Ted Roderer	Javelin throw	5th	
Men's	1953 Outdoor	Jim Herb	High jump	6th	
Men's	1954 Outdoor	Bob Hollen	3000 meters	4th	
Men's	1954 Outdoor	Rosey Grier	Shot put	5th	
Men's	1954 Outdoor	Charles Blockson	Shot put	6th	
Men's	1955 Outdoor	Bill Youkers	110 meters hurdles	4th	
Men's	1955 Outdoor	Art Pollard	200 meters	2nd	
Men's	1955 Outdoor	Rosey Grier	Shot put	5th	
Men's	1955 Outdoor	Rosey Grier	Discus throw	7th	
Men's	1957 Outdoor	Rod Perry	220 yards hurdles	5th	
Men's	1957 Outdoor	Rod Perry	110 meters hurdles	4th	
Men's	1957 Outdoor	John Tullar	Discus throw	7th	
Men's	1958 Outdoor	Ed Moran	Mile run	6th	
Men's	1959 Outdoor	Dick Engelbrink	Mile run	3rd	
Men's	1959 Outdoor	Ed Moran	Mile run	6th	
Men's	1959 Outdoor	Fred Kerr	3000 meters steeplechase	7th	
Men's	1960 Outdoor	Steve Moorhead	3000 meters steeplechase	2nd	
Men's	1961 Outdoor	Bob Brown	100 meters	5th	
Men's	1961 Outdoor	Steve Moorhead	3000 meters steeplechase	4th	
Men's	1961 Outdoor	Gerry Norman	5000 meters	4th	
Men's	1961 Outdoor	Jerry Whetstone	High jump	8th	
Men's	1962 Outdoor	Gerry Norman	5000 meters	7th	
Men's	1965 Indoor	Tom Bedick	4 × 800 meters relay	5th	
Men's	1965 Indoor	Dick Lampman	4 × 800 meters relay	5th	
Men's	1965 Indoor	Art Morris	4 × 800 meters relay	5th	
Men's	1965 Indoor	Bill Reilly	4 × 800 meters relay	5th	
Men's	1965 Outdoor	Lennart Hedmark	Javelin throw	2nd	
Men's	1965 Outdoor	Skip Krombolz	Javelin throw	7th	
Men's	1966 Outdoor	Chip Rockwell	Triple jump	2nd	
Men's	1966 Outdoor	James Stevenson	Javelin throw	1st	
Men's	1966 Outdoor	Skip Krombolz	Javelin throw	5th	
Men's	1968 Outdoor	Chip Rockwell	Triple jump	7th	
Men's	1969 Indoor	Roger Kauffman	Weight throw	4th	
Men's	1970 Outdoor	Greg Fredericks	5000 meters	5th	
Men's	1970 Outdoor	Scott Hagy	Javelin throw	8th	
Men's	1971 Outdoor	Greg Fredericks	5000 meters	2nd	
Men's	1971 Outdoor	Bob Gill	Javelin throw	7th	
Men's	1972 Outdoor	Greg Fredericks	5000 meters	2nd	
Men's	1972 Outdoor	Charlie Maguire	10,000 meters	8th	
Men's	1973 Outdoor	Charlie Maguire	10,000 meters	1st	
Men's	1973 Outdoor	Doug Finkel	4 × 100 meters relay	6th	
Men's	1973 Outdoor	Fred Singleton	4 × 100 meters relay	6th	
Men's	1973 Outdoor	Mike Sands	4 × 100 meters relay	6th	
Men's	1973 Outdoor	Jim Scott	4 × 100 meters relay	6th	
Men's	1973 Outdoor	Al Jackson	Hammer throw	5th	
Men's	1974 Indoor	Mike Sands	400 meters	3rd	
Men's	1974 Indoor	Charles Maquire	5000 meters	3rd	
Men's	1975 Indoor	Mike Sands	400 meters	1st	
Men's	1975 Indoor	Steve Hackman	4 × 400 meters relay	4th	
Men's	1975 Indoor	Randy Mosser	4 × 400 meters relay	4th	
Men's	1975 Indoor	Mike Sands	4 × 400 meters relay	4th	
Men's	1975 Indoor	Mike Shine	4 × 400 meters relay	4th	
Men's	1975 Indoor	Knut Hjeltnes	Shot put	5th	
Men's	1975 Outdoor	Mike Sands	400 meters	5th	
Men's	1975 Outdoor	Mike Shine	400 meters hurdles	6th	
Men's	1975 Outdoor	Knut Hjeltnes	Shot put	5th	
Men's	1975 Outdoor	Knut Hjeltnes	Discus throw	3rd	
Men's	1976 Indoor	Mike Shine	400 meters	3rd	
Men's	1976 Indoor	Alvin Jackson	Weight throw	4th	
Men's	1976 Outdoor	Mike Shine	110 meters hurdles	5th	
Men's	1976 Outdoor	Mike Shine	400 meters hurdles	2nd	
Men's	1976 Outdoor	George Malley	3000 meters steeplechase	4th	
Men's	1976 Outdoor	Alvin Jackson	Hammer throw	5th	
Men's	1977 Indoor	Mike Wyatt	Distance medley relay	3rd	
Men's	1977 Indoor	Keith Falco	Distance medley relay	3rd	
Men's	1977 Indoor	Pat Rexroat	Distance medley relay	3rd	
Men's	1977 Indoor	George Malley	Distance medley relay	3rd	
Men's	1977 Outdoor	Paul Stemmer	10,000 meters	8th	
Men's	1978 Indoor	Mike Wyatt	Distance medley relay	3rd	
Men's	1978 Indoor	Keith Falco	Distance medley relay	3rd	
Men's	1978 Indoor	Chris McHugh	Distance medley relay	3rd	
Men's	1978 Indoor	Tom Rapp	Distance medley relay	3rd	
Men's	1979 Outdoor	John Ziegler	10,000 meters	8th	
Men's	1980 Indoor	Alan Scharsu	5000 meters	4th	
Men's	1980 Outdoor	Paul Lankford	400 meters hurdles	4th	
Men's	1981 Indoor	John Zishka	3000 meters	3rd	
Men's	1981 Outdoor	Paul Lankford	400 meters hurdles	4th	
Men's	1982 Indoor	Paul Souza	High jump	6th	
Women's	1982 Outdoor	Tammie Hart	400 meters hurdles	5th	
Women's	1982 Outdoor	Vivian Riddick	Long jump	6th	
Women's	1982 Outdoor	Elanie Sobansky	Shot put	3rd	
Men's	1983 Indoor	Paul McLaughlin	4 × 800 meters relay	3rd	
Men's	1983 Indoor	Richard Moore	4 × 800 meters relay	3rd	
Men's	1983 Indoor	Ken Wyan	4 × 800 meters relay	3rd	
Men's	1983 Indoor	Michael Cook	4 × 800 meters relay	3rd	
Women's	1983 Indoor	Elaine Sobansky	Shot put	3rd	
Women's	1983 Outdoor	Doreen Startare	1500 meters	5th	
Women's	1983 Outdoor	Elaine Sobansky	Shot put	6th	
Women's	1984 Indoor	Judi Cassel	4 × 800 meters relay	6th	
Women's	1984 Indoor	Heidi Gerken	4 × 800 meters relay	6th	
Women's	1984 Indoor	Tammie Hart	4 × 800 meters relay	6th	
Women's	1984 Indoor	Beth Stever	4 × 800 meters relay	6th	
Women's	1984 Indoor	Elaine Sobansky	Shot put	2nd	
Women's	1984 Outdoor	Paula Renzi	5000 meters	6th	
Women's	1984 Outdoor	Elaine Sobansky	Shot put	3rd	
Women's	1984 Outdoor	Marilyn Senz	Javelin throw	6th	
Men's	1985 Indoor	Richard Moore	800 meters	3rd	
Men's	1985 Indoor	Vance Watson	Distance medley relay	4th	
Men's	1985 Indoor	Barry Robinson	Distance medley relay	4th	
Men's	1985 Indoor	Robert Hudson	Distance medley relay	4th	
Men's	1985 Indoor	Mark Overheim	Distance medley relay	4th	
Women's	1985 Indoor	Paula Renzi	3000 meters	3rd	
Men's	1985 Outdoor	Randy Moore	800 meters	4th	
Men's	1985 Outdoor	Rick Kleban	Decathlon	5th	
Men's	1987 Indoor	Steve Balkey	4 × 800 meters relay	6th	
Men's	1987 Indoor	Ray Levitre	4 × 800 meters relay	6th	
Men's	1987 Indoor	David McMillan	4 × 800 meters relay	6th	
Men's	1987 Indoor	Chris Mills	4 × 800 meters relay	6th	
Men's	1987 Outdoor	Ray Levitre	800 meters	2nd	
Men's	1987 Outdoor	Steve Balkey	1500 meters	6th	
Men's	1987 Outdoor	Eric Carter	10,000 meters	7th	
Men's	1987 Outdoor	Dave Masgay	Decathlon	7th	
Men's	1988 Outdoor	Steve Balkey	1500 meters	5th	
Men's	1988 Outdoor	C.J. Hunter	Shot put	5th	
Men's	1989 Indoor	Michael Timpson	200 meters	8th	
Men's	1989 Indoor	C.J. Hunter	Shot put	2nd	
Men's	1989 Outdoor	C.J. Hunter	Shot put	4th	
Women's	1989 Outdoor	Carmen Mann	Triple jump	5th	
Men's	1990 Indoor	C.J. Hunter	Shot put	1st	
Men's	1990 Indoor	Phil Caraher	Shot put	4th	
Women's	1990 Indoor	Stacia Prey	5000 meters	4th	
Men's	1990 Outdoor	C.J. Hunter	Shot put	2nd	
Men's	1991 Indoor	Phil Caraher	Shot put	2nd	
Women's	1991 Outdoor	Pam Connell	Heptathlon	4th	
Women's	1992 Outdoor	Shelley Mitchell	Heptathlon	8th	
Women's	1993 Indoor	Kim Kelly	5000 meters	6th	
Men's	1993 Outdoor	Kevin Cripanuk	400 meters hurdles	8th	
Men's	1993 Outdoor	Antonio Davis	Triple jump	7th	
Men's	1993 Outdoor	Brian Milne	Discus throw	1st	
Women's	1993 Outdoor	Kelli Hunt	10,000 meters	4th	
Women's	1993 Outdoor	Kim Kelly	10,000 meters	5th	
Men's	1994 Indoor	R.B. Caldwell	Distance medley relay	6th	
Men's	1994 Indoor	Bob Hamer	Distance medley relay	6th	
Men's	1994 Indoor	Phil Mellott	Distance medley relay	6th	
Men's	1994 Indoor	James Robbins	Distance medley relay	6th	
Women's	1994 Outdoor	Kelli Hunt	10,000 meters	7th	
Women's	1996 Indoor	Sue Huelster	Distance medley relay	4th	
Women's	1996 Indoor	Erica Bosler	Distance medley relay	4th	
Women's	1996 Indoor	Erin St. John	Distance medley relay	4th	
Women's	1996 Indoor	Kim McGreevy	Distance medley relay	4th	
Men's	1996 Outdoor	Steve Pina	Long jump	3rd	
Men's	1996 Outdoor	Rob Austin	Javelin throw	8th	
Women's	1996 Outdoor	Becky Gusic	Javelin throw	8th	
Men's	1997 Outdoor	Carl Wolter	Javelin throw	7th	
Women's	1997 Outdoor	Kim McGreevy	1500 meters	7th	
Women's	1997 Outdoor	Donna Fidler	10,000 meters	7th	
Men's	1998 Indoor	John Gorham	Long jump	7th	
Men's	1998 Indoor	Neal McNutt	Weight throw	7th	
Men's	1998 Outdoor	George Audu	Long jump	4th	
Men's	1998 Outdoor	John Gorham	Long jump	6th	
Men's	1999 Indoor	George Audu	Long jump	5th	
Women's	1999 Indoor	Shakeema Walker	Long jump	3rd	
Women's	1999 Indoor	Shakeema Walker	Triple jump	7th	
Men's	1999 Outdoor	George Audu	Long jump	6th	
Women's	1999 Outdoor	Susanne Heyer	1500 meters	4th	
Women's	1999 Outdoor	Shakeema Walker	Long jump	8th	
Women's	1999 Outdoor	Shakeema Walker	Triple jump	7th	
Women's	1999 Outdoor	Deshaya Williams	Discus throw	6th	
Women's	2001 Indoor	Connie Moore	200 meters	7th	
Men's	2001 Outdoor	Brian Derby	400 meters hurdles	4th	
Women's	2001 Outdoor	Brianne Johnson	Javelin throw	8th	
Men's	2002 Indoor	Ryan Olkowski	200 meters	8th	
Men's	2002 Indoor	Ryan Olkowski	High jump	5th	
Men's	2002 Outdoor	Ryan Olkowski	200 meters	8th	
Women's	2002 Outdoor	Deshaya Williams	Discus throw	6th	
Women's	2002 Outdoor	Brianne Johnson	Javelin throw	8th	
Women's	2003 Indoor	Chi-Chi Aduba	Long jump	5th	
Women's	2003 Indoor	Chi-Chi Aduba	Triple jump	4th	
Women's	2003 Outdoor	Connie Moore	100 meters	5th	
Women's	2003 Outdoor	Connie Moore	200 meters	3rd	
Women's	2003 Outdoor	Deshaya Williams	Discus throw	1st	
Women's	2003 Outdoor	Brianne Johnson	Javelin throw	5th	
Women's	2004 Indoor	Connie Moore	60 meters	7th	
Women's	2004 Indoor	Connie Moore	200 meters	3rd	
Women's	2004 Indoor	Chi-Chi Aduba	Triple jump	7th	
Women's	2004 Indoor	Ja'Nai O'Connor	Shot put	5th	
Women's	2004 Outdoor	Connie Moore	100 meters	7th	
Women's	2004 Outdoor	Connie Moore	200 meters	5th	
Women's	2004 Outdoor	Chi-Chi Aduba	Long jump	6th	
Women's	2004 Outdoor	Chi-Chi Aduba	Triple jump	7th	
Women's	2005 Indoor	Jennifer Leatherman	Weight throw	4th	
Women's	2005 Outdoor	Jen Leathermann	Hammer throw	7th	
Women's	2005 Outdoor	Diana Bruch	Javelin throw	8th	
Women's	2006 Indoor	Shana Cox	400 meters	7th	
Women's	2006 Indoor	Jennifer Leatherman	Weight throw	3rd	
Women's	2006 Outdoor	Shana Cox	400 meters	3rd	
Women's	2006 Outdoor	Jenn Leathermann	Hammer throw	5th	
Men's	2007 Indoor	Ryan Fritz	High jump	5th	
Women's	2007 Indoor	Shana Cox	400 meters	7th	
Women's	2007 Indoor	Briene Simmons	800 meters	7th	
Women's	2007 Indoor	Dominique Blake	4 × 400 meters relay	4th	
Women's	2007 Indoor	Briene Simmons	4 × 400 meters relay	4th	
Women's	2007 Indoor	Shana Cox	4 × 400 meters relay	4th	
Women's	2007 Indoor	Aleesha Barber	4 × 400 meters relay	4th	
Women's	2007 Outdoor	Shana Cox	400 meters	2nd	
Women's	2007 Outdoor	Gayle Hunter	Heptathlon	8th	
Women's	2008 Indoor	Aleesha Barber	60 meters hurdles	8th	
Women's	2008 Indoor	Shana Cox	400 meters	4th	
Women's	2008 Indoor	Bridget Franek	5000 meters	7th	
Women's	2008 Indoor	Dominique Blake	4 × 400 meters relay	5th	
Women's	2008 Indoor	Shana Cox	4 × 400 meters relay	5th	
Women's	2008 Indoor	Aleesha Barber	4 × 400 meters relay	5th	
Women's	2008 Indoor	Wendy Dorr	4 × 400 meters relay	5th	
Women's	2008 Indoor	Gayle Hunter	Pentathlon	5th	
Women's	2008 Outdoor	Aleesha Barber	100 meters hurdles	4th	
Women's	2008 Outdoor	Shana Cox	400 meters	1st	
Women's	2008 Outdoor	Bridget Franek	3000 meters steeplechase	3rd	
Women's	2008 Outdoor	Dominique Blake	4 × 400 meters relay	1st	
Women's	2008 Outdoor	Aleesha Barber	4 × 400 meters relay	1st	
Women's	2008 Outdoor	Gayle Hunter	4 × 400 meters relay	1st	
Women's	2008 Outdoor	Shana Cox	4 × 400 meters relay	1st	
Women's	2008 Outdoor	Gayle Hunter	Long jump	5th	
Women's	2008 Outdoor	Gayle Hunter	Heptathlon	5th	
Men's	2009 Indoor	Ryan Fritz	High jump	3rd	
Women's	2009 Indoor	Aleesha Barber	60 meters hurdles	4th	
Women's	2009 Indoor	Bridget Franek	5000 meters	4th	
Women's	2009 Indoor	Fawn Dorr	4 × 400 meters relay	3rd	
Women's	2009 Indoor	Aleesha Barber	4 × 400 meters relay	3rd	
Women's	2009 Indoor	Shavon Greaves	4 × 400 meters relay	3rd	
Women's	2009 Indoor	Gayle Hunter	4 × 400 meters relay	3rd	
Women's	2009 Indoor	Gayle Hunter	Pentathlon	2nd	
Men's	2009 Outdoor	Ryan Foster	800 meters	8th	
Men's	2009 Outdoor	Clarence Smith	Triple jump	8th	
Women's	2009 Outdoor	Fawn Dorr	400 meters hurdles	6th	
Women's	2009 Outdoor	Bridget Franek	3000 meters steeplechase	4th	
Women's	2009 Outdoor	Aleesha Barber	4 × 400 meters relay	4th	
Women's	2009 Outdoor	Shavon Greaves	4 × 400 meters relay	4th	
Women's	2009 Outdoor	Gayle Hunter	4 × 400 meters relay	4th	
Women's	2009 Outdoor	Fawn Dorr	4 × 400 meters relay	4th	
Women's	2009 Outdoor	Gayle Hunter	Heptathlon	5th	
Men's	2010 Indoor	Ryan Foster	800 meters	3rd	
Men's	2010 Indoor	Owen Dawson	800 meters	8th	
Men's	2010 Indoor	Joe Kovacs	Shot put	3rd	
Men's	2010 Indoor	Blake Eaton	Shot put	8th	
Women's	2010 Indoor	Shavon Greaves	200 meters	3rd	
Women's	2010 Indoor	Fawn Dorr	400 meters	5th	
Women's	2010 Indoor	Bridget Franek	3000 meters	7th	
Women's	2010 Indoor	Bridget Franek	5000 meters	4th	
Men's	2010 Outdoor	Ryan Fritz	High jump	4th	
Men's	2010 Outdoor	Blake Eaton	Shot put	3rd	
Women's	2010 Outdoor	Aleesha Barber	100 meters hurdles	3rd	
Women's	2010 Outdoor	Shavon Greaves	200 meters	7th	
Women's	2010 Outdoor	Fawn Dorr	400 meters hurdles	4th	
Women's	2010 Outdoor	Bridget Franek	3000 meters steeplechase	1st	
Women's	2010 Outdoor	Aleesha Barber	4 × 400 meters relay	4th	
Women's	2010 Outdoor	Shavon Greaves	4 × 400 meters relay	4th	
Women's	2010 Outdoor	Doris Anyanwu	4 × 400 meters relay	4th	
Women's	2010 Outdoor	Fawn Dorr	4 × 400 meters relay	4th	
Women's	2010 Outdoor	Karlee McQuillen	Javelin throw	3rd	
Men's	2011 Indoor	Brady Gehret	400 meters	3rd	
Men's	2011 Indoor	Ryan Foster	Mile run	3rd	
Men's	2011 Indoor	Aaron Nadolsky	4 × 400 meters relay	5th	
Men's	2011 Indoor	Lionel Williams	4 × 400 meters relay	5th	
Men's	2011 Indoor	Casimir Loxsom	4 × 400 meters relay	5th	
Men's	2011 Indoor	Brady Gehret	4 × 400 meters relay	5th	
Women's	2011 Indoor	Doris Anyanwu	4 × 400 meters relay	6th	
Women's	2011 Indoor	Ijeoma Iheoma	4 × 400 meters relay	6th	
Women's	2011 Indoor	Shavon Greaves	4 × 400 meters relay	6th	
Women's	2011 Indoor	Megan Duncan	4 × 400 meters relay	6th	
Men's	2011 Outdoor	Casimir Loxsom	800 meters	4th	
Men's	2011 Outdoor	Joe Kovacs	Shot put	3rd	
Women's	2011 Outdoor	Doris Anyanwu	4 × 400 meters relay	4th	
Women's	2011 Outdoor	Shavon Greaves	4 × 400 meters relay	4th	
Women's	2011 Outdoor	Ijeoma Iheoma	4 × 400 meters relay	4th	
Women's	2011 Outdoor	Megan Duncan	4 × 400 meters relay	4th	
Men's	2012 Indoor	Aaron Nadolsky	4 × 400 meters relay	2nd	
Men's	2012 Indoor	Brandon Bennett-Green	4 × 400 meters relay	2nd	
Men's	2012 Indoor	Casimir Loxsom	4 × 400 meters relay	2nd	
Men's	2012 Indoor	Brady Gehret	4 × 400 meters relay	2nd	
Men's	2012 Outdoor	Brady Gehret	400 meters	6th	
Men's	2012 Outdoor	Aaron Nadolsky	4 × 400 meters relay	4th	
Men's	2012 Outdoor	Casimir Loxsom	4 × 400 meters relay	4th	
Men's	2012 Outdoor	Brady Gehret	4 × 400 meters relay	4th	
Men's	2012 Outdoor	Brandon Bennett-Green	4 × 400 meters relay	4th	
Men's	2012 Outdoor	Joe Kovacs	Shot put	4th	
Women's	2012 Outdoor	Laura Loht	Javelin throw	3rd	
Women's	2012 Outdoor	Lauren Kenney	Javelin throw	4th	
Men's	2013 Indoor	Casimir Loxsom	800 meters	2nd	
Men's	2013 Indoor	Brannon Kidder	Distance medley relay	2nd	
Men's	2013 Indoor	Brandon Bennett-Green	Distance medley relay	2nd	
Men's	2013 Indoor	Za'Von Watkins	Distance medley relay	2nd	
Men's	2013 Indoor	Robby Creese	Distance medley relay	2nd	
Men's	2013 Indoor	Will Barr	Weight throw	6th	
Men's	2013 Outdoor	Casimir Loxsom	800 meters	2nd	
Men's	2013 Outdoor	Brannon Kidder	800 meters	3rd	
Men's	2013 Outdoor	Robby Creese	1500 meters	6th	
Women's	2013 Outdoor	Laura Loht	Javelin throw	4th	
Women's	2013 Outdoor	Lauren Kenney	Javelin throw	5th	
Men's	2014 Indoor	Za'Von Watkins	800 meters	7th	
Men's	2014 Indoor	Steve Waithe	Triple jump	6th	
Men's	2014 Indoor	Will Barr	Weight throw	8th	
Women's	2014 Indoor	Mahagony Jones	200 meters	3rd	
Women's	2014 Indoor	Kiah Seymour	400 meters	6th	
Women's	2014 Indoor	Dynasty McGee	4 × 400 meters relay	5th	
Women's	2014 Indoor	Mahagony Jones	4 × 400 meters relay	5th	
Women's	2014 Indoor	Tichina Rhodes	4 × 400 meters relay	5th	
Women's	2014 Indoor	Kiah Seymour	4 × 400 meters relay	5th	
Women's	2014 Indoor	Brittney Howell	Pentathlon	7th	
Men's	2014 Outdoor	Steve Waithe	Triple jump	5th	
Men's	2014 Outdoor	Robert Cardina	Decathlon	8th	
Women's	2014 Outdoor	Mahagony Jones	100 meters	7th	
Women's	2014 Outdoor	Mahagony Jones	200 meters	4th	
Women's	2014 Outdoor	Kiah Seymour	400 meters hurdles	6th	
Women's	2014 Outdoor	Dynasty McGee	4 × 400 meters relay	5th	
Women's	2014 Outdoor	Mahagony Jones	4 × 400 meters relay	5th	
Women's	2014 Outdoor	Tichina Rhodes	4 × 400 meters relay	5th	
Women's	2014 Outdoor	Kiah Seymour	4 × 400 meters relay	5th	
Women's	2014 Outdoor	Laura Loht	Javelin throw	5th	
Men's	2015 Indoor	Brannon Kidder	Mile run	7th	
Men's	2015 Indoor	Brannon Kidder	Distance medley relay	2nd	
Men's	2015 Indoor	Alex Shisler	Distance medley relay	2nd	
Men's	2015 Indoor	Za'Von Watkins	Distance medley relay	2nd	
Men's	2015 Indoor	Robby Creese	Distance medley relay	2nd	
Men's	2015 Indoor	Darrell Hill	Shot put	4th	
Women's	2015 Indoor	Megan Osborne	4 × 400 meters relay	8th	
Women's	2015 Indoor	Dynasty McGee	4 × 400 meters relay	8th	
Women's	2015 Indoor	Tichina Rhodes	4 × 400 meters relay	8th	
Women's	2015 Indoor	Kiah Seymour	4 × 400 meters relay	8th	
Men's	2015 Outdoor	Brannon Kidder	800 meters	2nd	
Men's	2015 Outdoor	Steve Waithe	Triple jump	8th	
Men's	2015 Outdoor	Darrell Hill	Shot put	2nd	
Men's	2016 Indoor	Brannon Kidder	800 meters	7th	
Women's	2016 Indoor	Rachel Fatherly	Shot put	7th	
Men's	2016 Outdoor	Isaiah Harris	800 meters	4th	
Men's	2016 Outdoor	Brannon Kidder	1500 meters	4th	
Men's	2016 Outdoor	Brian Leap	Triple jump	6th	
Men's	2017 Indoor	Isaiah Harris	800 meters	4th	
Women's	2017 Indoor	Danae Rivers	Mile run	3rd	
Women's	2017 Indoor	Tessa Barrett	5000 meters	5th	
Women's	2017 Indoor	Danae Rivers	Distance medley relay	6th	
Women's	2017 Indoor	Tichina Rhodes	Distance medley relay	6th	
Women's	2017 Indoor	Rachel Banks	Distance medley relay	6th	
Women's	2017 Indoor	Julie Kocjancic	Distance medley relay	6th	
Women's	2017 Indoor	Dannielle Gibson	Triple jump	8th	
Men's	2017 Outdoor	Isaiah Harris	800 meters	2nd	
Men's	2017 Outdoor	Michael Shuey	Javelin throw	3rd	
Women's	2017 Outdoor	Tori Gerlach	3000 meters steeplechase	3rd	
Women's	2017 Outdoor	Dannielle Gibson	Triple jump	6th	
Men's	2018 Indoor	Isaiah Harris	800 meters	2nd	
Men's	2018 Indoor	David Lucas	Weight throw	1st	
Women's	2018 Indoor	Danae Rivers	800 meters	7th	
Women's	2018 Indoor	Maddie Nickal	Pentathlon	7th	
Men's	2018 Outdoor	Isaiah Harris	800 meters	1st	
Men's	2018 Outdoor	David Lucas	Discus throw	7th	
Men's	2018 Outdoor	Morgan Shigo	Hammer throw	6th	
Women's	2018 Outdoor	Danae Rivers	1500 meters	8th	
Women's	2018 Outdoor	Megan McCloskey	High jump	4th	
Women's	2018 Outdoor	Maddie Nickal	Heptathlon	3rd	
Men's	2019 Indoor	Morgan Shigo	Weight throw	5th	
Men's	2019 Indoor	David Lucas	Weight throw	8th	
Women's	2019 Indoor	Alexis Holmes	400 meters	4th	
Women's	2019 Indoor	Danae Rivers	800 meters	1st	
Men's	2019 Outdoor	Morgan Shigo	Hammer throw	7th	
Women's	2021 Outdoor	Danae Rivers	1500 meters	4th	
Women's	2021 Outdoor	Maddie Nickal	Heptathlon	6th	
Men's	2022 Outdoor	Tyler Merkley	Hammer throw	2nd	
Men's	2023 Indoor	Handal Roban	800 meters	3rd	
Men's	2023 Outdoor	Handal Roban	800 meters	3rd	
Men's	2023 Outdoor	Evan Dorenkamp	1500 meters	8th	
Men's	2023 Outdoor	Tyler Merkley	Hammer throw	7th	
Women's	2023 Outdoor	Mallory Kauffman	Shot put	6th	
Men's	2024 Indoor	Cheickna Traore	60 meters	7th	
Men's	2024 Indoor	Cheickna Traore	200 meters	2nd	
Men's	2024 Indoor	Handal Roban	800 meters	7th	
Women's	2024 Indoor	Hayley Kitching	800 meters	4th	
Women's	2024 Indoor	Madaline Ullom	Distance medley relay	8th	
Women's	2024 Indoor	Zoey Goldstein	Distance medley relay	8th	
Women's	2024 Indoor	Victoria Vanriele	Distance medley relay	8th	
Women's	2024 Indoor	Florence Caron	Distance medley relay	8th	
Men's	2024 Outdoor	Cheickna Traore	200 meters	1st	
Women's	2024 Outdoor	Hayley Kitching	800 meters	5th	

== See also ==
- Category:Penn State Nittany Lions men's track and field athletes (36)
- Category:Penn State Nittany Lions women's track and field athletes (12)
