= 200 meters at the NCAA Division I Outdoor Track and Field Championships =

This is a list of NCAA Division I outdoor champions in the 200 meters and its imperial equivalent 220 yard dash. For men, the imperial distance was contested until 1975 excepting Olympic years starting in 1932. Metrication occurred in 1976, so all subsequent championships were at the metric distance. Hand timing was used until 1973, while starting in 1974 fully automatic timing was used. The women's race began in 1982.

== Women's winners ==
Key
w = wind aided
A = Altitude assisted
bold = NCAA record/Championship record

Year	Name	Nationality	Team	Time
1982	Florence Griffith	United States	UCLA	22.39
1983	Merlene Ottey	Jamaica	Nebraska	22.39
1984	Randy Givens	United States	Florida St	22.87
1985	Juliet Cuthbert	Jamaica	Texas	22.55w
1986	Juliet Cuthbert	Jamaica	Texas	22.71
1987	Gwen Torrence	United States	Georgia	22.37w
1988	Mary Onyali	Nigeria	Texas Southern	22.70
1989	Dawn Sowell	United States	Louisiana St	22.04
1990	Esther Jones	United States	Louisiana St	22.49
1991	Carlette Guidry	United States	Texas	22.44w
1992	Dahlia Duhaney	Jamaica	Louisiana St	22.80
1993	Holli Hyche	United States	Indiana St	22.34
1994	Merlene Frazer	Jamaica	Texas	22.49w
1995	Savatheda Fynes	Bahamas	Eastern Michigan	22.63
1996	Zundra Feagin	United States	Louisiana St	22.44
1997	Savatheda Fynes	Bahamas	Michigan St	22.61
1998	Debbie Ferguson	Bahamas	Georgia	22.66
1999	LaTasha Jenkins	United States	Ball St	22.29
2000	Peta-Gaye Dowdie	Jamaica	Louisiana St	22.51
2001	Brianna Glenn	United States	Arizona	22.92w
2002	Natasha Mayers	Saint Vincent and the Grenadines	Southern Cal	22.93
2003	Aleen Bailey	Jamaica	South Carolina	22.65
2004	LaShaunte'a Moore	United States	Arkansas	22.37w
2005	Sheri-Ann Brooks	Jamaica	Florida Int	22.85
2006	Shalonda Solomon	United States	South Carolina	22.62 (+0.8 m/s)
2007	Kerron Stewart	United States	Auburn	22.42 (+1.7 m/s)
2008	Simone Facey	Jamaica	Texas A&M	22.63 (−0.2 m/s)
2009	Porscha Lucas	United States	Texas A&M	22.81 (−1.2 m/s)
2010	Porscha Lucas	United States	Texas A&M	22.83 (+1.2 m/s)
2011	Kimberlyn Duncan	United States	LSU	22.24 (+1.5 m/s)
2012	Kimberlyn Duncan	United States	LSU	22.86 (−2.3 m/s)
2013	Kimberlyn Duncan	United States	LSU	22.04 (+3.5 m/s)
2014	Kamaria Brown	United States	Texas A&M	22.63 (+2.2 m/s)
2015	Dezerea Bryant	United States	Kentucky	22.18 (+1.9 m/s)
2016	Ariana Washington	United States	Oregon	22.21 (+1.9 m/s)
2017	Kyra Jefferson	United States	Florida	22.02 (+1.1 m/s)
2018	Anglerne Annelus	United States	USC	22.76 (−2.3 m/s)
2019	Anglerne Annelus	United States	USC	22.16 (+1.3 m/s)
2021	Cambrea Sturgis	United States	N. Carolina A&T	22.12 (+0.2 m/s)
2022	Abby Steiner	United States	Kentucky	21.80 (+1.3 m/s)
2023	Julien Alfred	Saint Lucia	Texas	21.73 (+2.5 m/s)
2024	McKenzie Long	United States	Ole Miss	21.83 (+1.0 m/s)
2025	JaMeesia Ford	United States	South Carolina	22.21 (+1.6 m/s)
2026	Adaejah Hodge	British Virgin Islands	Georgia	**21.68** (−0.4 m/s) CR MR

== Men's winners ==
Key
y=yards
w=wind aided
A=Altitude assisted
bold = NCAA record/Championship record

Year	Name, (Country)	Team	Time
1921	Eric Wilson	Iowa	22.6y
1922	Leonard Paulu	Grinnell	21.8y
1923	Eric Wilson	Iowa	21.9y
1924	Not held		
1925	Glen Gray	Butler	21.9y
1926	Roland Locke	Nebraska	20.9y
1927	Fred Alderman	Michigan St	21.1y
1928	Claude Bracey	Rice	20.9y
1929	George Simpson	Ohio St	20.8y
1930	George Simpson	Ohio St	20.7y
1931	Eddie Tolan	Michigan	21.5y
1932	Ralph Metcalfe	Marquette	20.3
1933	Ralph Metcalfe	Marquette	20.4y
1934	Ralph Metcalfe	Marquette	20.9y
1935	Jesse Owens	Ohio St	21.5y
1936	Jesse Owens	Ohio St	21.3
1937	Ben Johnson	Columbia	21.3y
1938	Mack Robinson	Oregon	21.3y
1939	Clyde Jeffrey	Stanford	21.1y
1940	Norwood "Barney" Ewell	Penn St	21.1y
1941	Norwood "Barney" Ewell	Penn St	21.1y
1942	Hal Davis	California	21.2y
1943	Hal Davis	California	21.4y
1944	Buddy Young	Illinois	21.6y
1945	Earl Collins	Texas	22.4y
1946	Herb McKenley Jamaica	Illinois	21.3y
1947	Herb McKenley Jamaica	Illinois	20.7yA
1948	Mel Patton	Southern Cal	20.7
1949	Mel Patton	Southern Cal	20.4y
1950	Charley Parker	Texas	21.5y
1951	George Rhoden Jamaica	Morgan St	20.7y
1952	Jim Ford	Drake	21
1953	Thane Baker	Kansas St	21.5y
1954	Charles Thomas	Texas	20.7y
1955	Jim Golliday	Northwestern	21.1y
1956	Bobby Morrow	Abilene Christian	20.6
1957	Bobby Morrow	Abilene Christian	21.0y
1958	Ed Collymore	Villanova	20.7y
1959	Ray Norton	San Jose St	20.9y
1960	Charlie Tidwell	Kansas	20.8
1961	Frank Budd	Villanova	20.8y
1962	Harry Jerome Canada	Oregon	20.8y
1963	Henry Carr	Arizona St	20.5Ay
1964	Bob Hayes	Florida A&M	20.4w
1965	Earl Horner	Villanova	21.1yw
1966	Tom Jones	UCLA	21.12y
1967	Tommie Smith	San Jose St	20.26Ay
1968	Emmett Taylor	Ohio	20.8
1969	John Carlos	San Jose St	20.2y
1970	Willie Turner	Oregon St	20.6y
1971	Larry Black	NC Central	20.5y
1972	Larry Burton	Purdue	20.5w
1973	Marshall Dill	Michigan St	20.9y
1974	James Gilkes Guyana	Fisk	19.9yw
1975	Reggie Jones	Tennessee	20.60Ay
1976	Harvey Glance	Auburn	20.74
1977	William Snoddy	Oklahoma	20.48
1978	Clancy Edwards	Southern Cal	20.16
1979	Greg Foster	UCLA	20.22
1980	Mike Roberson	Florida St	19.96w
1981	Dwayne Evans	Arizona St	20.20w
1982	James Butler	Oklahoma St	20.07Aw
1983	Elliott Quow	Rutgers	20.31
1984	Kirk Baptiste	Houston	20.16w
1985	Kirk Baptiste	Houston	20.03w
1986	Floyd Heard	Texas A&M	20.34
1987	Floyd Heard	Texas A&M	20.03w
1988	Lorenzo Daniel	Mississippi St	19.87
1989	Dennis Mitchell	Florida	20.09A
1990	Michael Johnson	Baylor	20.31
1991	Frankie Fredericks Namibia	Brigham Young	19.90w
1992	Olapade Adeniken Nigeria	UTEP	20.11
1993	Chris Nelloms	Ohio St	20.27
1994	Andrew Tynes Bahamas	UTEP	20.20w
1995	Ato Boldon Trinidad and Tobago	UCLA	20.24
1996	Rohsaan Griffin	Louisiana St	20.24
1997	Obadele Thompson Barbados	UTEP	20.03
1998	Curtis Perry	Louisiana St	20.4
1999	John Capel	Florida	19.87
2000	Shawn Crawford	Clemson	20.09
2001	Justin Gatlin	Tennessee	20.11w
2002	Justin Gatlin	Tennessee	20.18
2003	Leo Bookman	Kansas	20.47
2004	Wallace Spearmon	Arkansas	20.12w
2005	Wallace Spearmon	Arkansas	19.91
2006	Walter Dix	Florida State	20.30
2007	Walter Dix	Florida State	20.32
2008	Walter Dix	Florida State	20.40
2009	Charles Clark	Florida State	20.55
2010	(Trinidad and Tobago) Rondel Sorrillo	Kentucky	20.36w
2011	Maurice Mitchell	Florida State	19.99w
2012	Maurice Mitchell	Florida State	20.40w
2013	Ameer Webb	Texas A&M	20.10w
2014	Dedric Dukes	Florida	19.91w
2015	(Canada) Andre De Grasse	USC	19.58 (+2.4 m/s)
2016	Jarrion Lawson	Arkansas	20.19 (−0.2 m/s)
2017	Christian Coleman	Tennessee	20.25 (−3.1 m/s)
2018	(Nigeria) Divine Oduduru	Texas Tech	20.28 (±0.0 m/s)
2019	(Nigeria) Divine Oduduru	Texas Tech	19.73 (+0.8 m/s)
2020	Canceled due to COVID-19		
2021	(Liberia) / (United States) Joseph Fahnbulleh	Florida	19.91 (−0.4 m/s)
2022	(Liberia) / (United States) Joseph Fahnbulleh	Florida	19.83 (+0.6 m/s)
2023	(Nigeria) Udodi Onwuzurike	Stanford	19.84 (+0.9 m/s)
2024	(Ivory Coast) Cheickna Traore	Penn State	19.95 (−0.1 m/s)
2025	(Zimbabwe) Tapiwanashe Makarawu	Kentucky	19.84 (+0.3 m/s)
2026	(Cayman Islands) Jaiden Reid	LSU	**19.63** (+1.5 m/s) CR MR
