= Iowa Hawkeyes track and field =

College track and field team

- University: University of Iowa
- Head coach: Joey Woody
- Conference: Big Ten
- Location: Iowa City, Iowa
- Outdoor track: Francis X. Cretzmeyer Track
- Nickname: Hawkeyes
- Colors: Black and gold

The Iowa Hawkeyes track and field team is the track and field program that represents University of Iowa. The Hawkeyes compete in NCAA Division I as a member of the Big Ten Conference. The team is based in Iowa City, Iowa at the Francis X. Cretzmeyer Track.

The program is coached by Joey Woody. The track and field program officially encompasses four teams because the NCAA considers men's and women's indoor track and field and outdoor track and field as separate sports.

Ed Gordon has won the most individual NCAA titles of any Hawkeye athlete, with 3 in the long jump.

== Postseason ==
=== AIAW ===
The Hawkeyes have had 7 AIAW All-Americans finishing in the top six at the AIAW indoor or outdoor championships.

AIAW All-Americans
Championships	Name	Event	Place
1982 Indoor	Kay Stormo	880 yards	2nd
1982 Indoor	Nan Doak	2 miles	6th
1982 Indoor	Nan Doak	3 miles	5th
1982 Indoor	Kay Stormo	Distance medley relay	4th
1982 Indoor	Chris Davenport	Distance medley relay	4th
1982 Indoor	Jenny Hayden	Distance medley relay	4th
1982 Indoor	Nan Doak	Distance medley relay	4th
1982 Outdoor	Kay Stormo	800 meters	3rd
1982 Outdoor	Jodi Hershberger	3000 meters	6th
1982 Outdoor	Nan Doak	5000 meters	4th
1982 Outdoor	Jenny Spangler	10,000 meters	5th
1982 Outdoor	Jenny Spangler	10,000 meters	5th
1970 Outdoor	Kathy Gillespie	Heptathlon	2nd

=== NCAA ===
As of 2024, a total of 101 men and 23 women have achieved individual first-team All-American status at the Division I men's outdoor, women's outdoor, men's indoor, or women's indoor national championships (using the modern criteria of top-8 placing regardless of athlete nationality).

First team NCAA All-Americans
Team	Championships	Name	Event	Place	Ref.
Men's	1921 Outdoor	Hal Crawford	220 yards hurdles	>5th (Note: Listed as "perhaps also ran" by Track and Field News)	
Men's	1921 Outdoor	Eric Wilson	100 meters	4th	
Men's	1921 Outdoor	Hal Crawford	110 meters hurdles	2nd	
Men's	1921 Outdoor	Eric Wilson	200 meters	1st	
Men's	1921 Outdoor	Edgar Hoffman	High jump	3rd	
Men's	1921 Outdoor	Duke Slater	Hammer throw	3rd	
Men's	1922 Outdoor	Charley Brookins	220 yards hurdles	1st	
Men's	1922 Outdoor	Eric Wilson	200 meters	2nd	
Men's	1922 Outdoor	Harry Morrow	800 meters	3rd	
Men's	1922 Outdoor	Edgar Hoffman	High jump	5th	
Men's	1922 Outdoor	Aubrey Devine	Pole vault	3rd	
Men's	1923 Outdoor	Charley Brookins	220 yards hurdles	1st	
Men's	1923 Outdoor	Charley Brookins	100 meters	4th	
Men's	1923 Outdoor	Eric Wilson	200 meters	1st	
Men's	1923 Outdoor	Harry Morrow	800 meters	5th	
Men's	1923 Outdoor	Harol Phelps	3000 meters	5th	
Men's	1925 Outdoor	Orthal Roberts	100 meters	5th	
Men's	1925 Outdoor	Chan Coulter	400 meters	5th	
Men's	1925 Outdoor	Harold Phelps	3000 meters	2nd	
Men's	1925 Outdoor	Paul Jones	Long jump	4th	
Men's	1925 Outdoor	Ray Dauber	Shot put	6th	
Men's	1925 Outdoor	John Hancock	Discus throw	6th	
Men's	1925 Outdoor	Elvin Handy	Hammer throw	5th	
Men's	1926 Outdoor	Frank Cuhel	220 yards hurdles	6th	
Men's	1926 Outdoor	David Thomas	High jump	5th	
Men's	1926 Outdoor	Emerson Nelson	Hammer throw	3rd	
Men's	1926 Outdoor	Earl Williams	Hammer throw	4th	
Men's	1926 Outdoor	Fred Marquis	Hammer throw	5th	
Men's	1927 Outdoor	Frank Cuhel	220 yards hurdles	2nd	
Men's	1927 Outdoor	Frank Cuhel	110 meters hurdles	2nd	
Men's	1927 Outdoor	John Everingham	200 meters	4th	
Men's	1927 Outdoor	Xavier Boyles	Pole vault	2nd	
Men's	1927 Outdoor	Cecil Mau	Discus throw	5th	
Men's	1927 Outdoor	Vernon Lapp	Hammer throw	5th	
Men's	1928 Outdoor	Frank Cuhel	220 yards hurdles	1st	
Men's	1928 Outdoor	George Baird	400 meters	4th	
Men's	1928 Outdoor	Albright Coe	Pole vault	4th	
Men's	1928 Outdoor	Loris "Horse" Hagerty	Discus throw	4th	
Men's	1928 Outdoor	Emerson Nelson	Discus throw	6th	
Men's	1928 Outdoor	Emerson Nelson	Hammer throw	4th	
Men's	1928 Outdoor	Vern Lapp	Hammer throw	5th	
Men's	1929 Outdoor	Ed Gordon	High jump	2nd	
Men's	1929 Outdoor	Henry Canby	Pole vault	3rd	
Men's	1929 Outdoor	Ed Gordon	Long jump	1st	
Men's	1929 Outdoor	Jim Gilchrist	Hammer throw	6th	
Men's	1930 Outdoor	Henry Canby	Pole vault	6th	
Men's	1930 Outdoor	Ed Gordon	Long jump	1st	
Men's	1930 Outdoor	Jim Gilchrist	Hammer throw	2nd	
Men's	1930 Outdoor	Wesley Yongerman	Hammer throw	4th	
Men's	1930 Outdoor	James Hart	Hammer throw	5th	
Men's	1930 Outdoor	L.D. Weldon	Javelin throw	4th	
Men's	1930 Outdoor	Elmo Nelson	Javelin throw	5th	
Men's	1931 Outdoor	Ed Gordon	High jump	6th	
Men's	1931 Outdoor	Ed Gordon	Long jump	1st	
Men's	1931 Outdoor	Wesley Youngerman	Discus throw	6th	
Men's	1931 Outdoor	Wesley Youngerman	Hammer throw	5th	
Men's	1931 Outdoor	Elgar Mathies	Hammer throw	6th	
Men's	1931 Outdoor	Elmo Nelson	Javelin throw	2nd	
Men's	1931 Outdoor	L.D. Weldon	Javelin throw	4th	
Men's	1932 Outdoor	George Saling	220 yards hurdles	2nd	
Men's	1932 Outdoor	George Saling	110 meters hurdles	1st	
Men's	1932 Outdoor	Larue Thurston	400 meters hurdles	4th	
Men's	1932 Outdoor	Wesley Youngerman	Hammer throw	6th	
Men's	1933 Outdoor	Sidney Dean	400 meters	4th	
Men's	1934 Outdoor	Mark Panther	Javelin throw	7th	
Men's	1935 Outdoor	Mark Panther	Javelin throw	8th	
Men's	1945 Outdoor	Clayton Wilkinson	High jump	4th	
Men's	1945 Outdoor	Paul Fagerlind	Javelin throw	2nd	
Men's	1951 Outdoor	Gary Scott	200 meters	6th	
Men's	1952 Outdoor	Ted Wheeler	800 meters	5th	
Men's	1953 Outdoor	Rich Ferguson	3000 meters	1st	
Men's	1954 Outdoor	Earl Smith	Long jump	4th	
Men's	1955 Outdoor	Jack Matthews	220 yards hurdles	2nd	
Men's	1955 Outdoor	Les Stevens	110 meters hurdles	5th	
Men's	1955 Outdoor	Jack Matthews	110 meters hurdles	8th	
Men's	1955 Outdoor	Rich Ferguson	Mile run	7th	
Men's	1955 Outdoor	Les Stevens	High jump	6th	
Men's	1956 Outdoor	Ted Wheeler	1500 meters	5th	
Men's	1957 Outdoor	Jack Matthews	110 meters hurdles	6th	
Men's	1957 Outdoor	Deacon Jones	3000 meters	1st	
Men's	1958 Outdoor	Deacon Jones	3000 meters	2nd	
Men's	1960 Outdoor	Jerry Williams	400 meters hurdles	8th	
Men's	1962 Outdoor	Bill Frazier	800 meters	2nd	
Men's	1962 Outdoor	Cloyd Webb	Discus throw	6th	
Men's	1963 Outdoor	Gary Hollingsworth	400 meters	8th	
Men's	1963 Outdoor	Bill Frazier	800 meters	7th	
Men's	1965 Outdoor	Jon Reimer	400 meters hurdles	7th	
Men's	1966 Outdoor	Mike Mondane	400 meters	4th	
Men's	1966 Outdoor	Bill Burnette	Pole vault	5th	
Men's	1967 Indoor	Larry Wieczorek	Mile run	3rd	
Men's	1967 Indoor	Fred Ferree	4 × 400 meters relay	3rd	
Men's	1967 Indoor	Carl Frazier	4 × 400 meters relay	3rd	
Men's	1967 Indoor	Mike Mondane	4 × 400 meters relay	3rd	
Men's	1967 Indoor	Jon Reimer	4 × 400 meters relay	3rd	
Men's	1967 Outdoor	Mike Mondane	400 meters	3rd	
Men's	1967 Outdoor	Jon Reimer	400 meters hurdles	6th	
Men's	1967 Outdoor	Larry Wieczorek	Mile run	4th	
Men's	1967 Outdoor	Rollie Kitt	3000 meters steeplechase	6th	
Men's	1967 Outdoor	Fred Ferree	4 × 400 meters relay	1st	
Men's	1967 Outdoor	Carl Frazier	4 × 400 meters relay	1st	
Men's	1967 Outdoor	Jon Reimer	4 × 400 meters relay	1st	
Men's	1967 Outdoor	Mike Mondane	4 × 400 meters relay	1st	
Men's	1968 Indoor	Mike Mondane	600 yards	4th	
Men's	1968 Outdoor	Mike Mondane	400 meters	6th	
Men's	1969 Indoor	Carl Frazier	600 yards	5th	
Men's	1973 Indoor	Dick Eisenlauer	400 meters	5th	
Men's	1975 Indoor	William Knodel	High jump	2nd	
Men's	1977 Indoor	Joe Paul	Distance medley relay	4th	
Men's	1977 Indoor	Tom Slack	Distance medley relay	4th	
Men's	1977 Indoor	Joel Moeller	Distance medley relay	4th	
Men's	1977 Indoor	Jim Docherty	Distance medley relay	4th	
Men's	1978 Indoor	Bill Hansen	High jump	3rd	
Men's	1978 Outdoor	Bill Hansen	High jump	8th	
Men's	1979 Indoor	Bill Martin	800 meters	4th	
Women's	1983 Indoor	Mary Mol	High jump	2nd	
Men's	1983 Outdoor	Ronnie McCoy	110 meters hurdles	4th	
Men's	1983 Outdoor	Jeff Patrick	200 meters	7th	
Women's	1983 Outdoor	Nan Doak	5000 meters	6th	
Women's	1983 Outdoor	Jenny Spangler	10,000 meters	7th	
Men's	1984 Indoor	Victor Greer	4 × 400 meters relay	5th	
Men's	1984 Indoor	Kenny Williams	4 × 400 meters relay	5th	
Men's	1984 Indoor	Caesar Smith	4 × 400 meters relay	5th	
Men's	1984 Indoor	Terrence Duckett	4 × 400 meters relay	5th	
Men's	1985 Outdoor	Ronnie McCoy	110 meters hurdles	7th	
Women's	1985 Outdoor	Penny O'Brien	3000 meters	5th	
Women's	1985 Outdoor	Nan Doak	10,000 meters	1st	
Women's	1987 Indoor	Sherri Suppelsa	4 × 800 meters relay	6th	
Women's	1987 Indoor	Jeanne Kruckeberg	4 × 800 meters relay	6th	
Women's	1987 Indoor	Kim Schneckloth	4 × 800 meters relay	6th	
Women's	1987 Indoor	Janet Wodek	4 × 800 meters relay	6th	
Women's	1988 Indoor	Jeanne Kruckeberg	Mile run	6th	
Men's	1988 Outdoor	Pat McGhee	400 meters hurdles	2nd	
Women's	1989 Indoor	Jeanne Kruckenberg	800 meters	2nd	
Men's	1989 Outdoor	Pat McGhee	110 meters hurdles	5th	
Men's	1989 Outdoor	Pat McGhee	400 meters hurdles	2nd	
Women's	1991 Outdoor	Jennifer Brower	10,000 meters	5th	
Men's	1992 Indoor	Anthaun Maybank	Long jump	3rd	
Women's	1992 Indoor	Tracy Dahl	5000 meters	1st	
Men's	1992 Outdoor	Anthuan Maybank	400 meters	8th	
Women's	1992 Outdoor	Tracy Dahl	5000 meters	3rd	
Women's	1992 Outdoor	Jennifer Brower	10,000 meters	3rd	
Men's	1993 Indoor	Anthaun Maybank	Long jump	4th	
Women's	1993 Indoor	Tracy Dahl	5000 meters	1st	
Men's	1993 Outdoor	Anthuan Maybank	400 meters	2nd	
Men's	1993 Outdoor	Anthuan Maybank	Long jump	6th	
Women's	1994 Outdoor	Tanja Reid	4 × 100 meters relay	6th	
Women's	1994 Outdoor	Yolanda Hobbs	4 × 100 meters relay	6th	
Women's	1994 Outdoor	Tina Floyd	4 × 100 meters relay	6th	
Women's	1994 Outdoor	Marlene Poole	4 × 100 meters relay	6th	
Men's	1995 Outdoor	Andre Morris	400 meters	3rd	
Men's	1995 Outdoor	Andre Morris	4 × 400 meters relay	4th	
Men's	1995 Outdoor	Chris Davis	4 × 400 meters relay	4th	
Men's	1995 Outdoor	George Page	4 × 400 meters relay	4th	
Men's	1995 Outdoor	Edward Rozell	4 × 400 meters relay	4th	
Men's	1996 Outdoor	Edward Rozell	4 × 400 meters relay	5th	
Men's	1996 Outdoor	Andre Morris	4 × 400 meters relay	5th	
Men's	1996 Outdoor	Chris Davis	4 × 400 meters relay	5th	
Men's	1996 Outdoor	Bashir Yamini	4 × 400 meters relay	5th	
Men's	1997 Indoor	Bashir Yamini	Long jump	2nd	
Women's	1997 Outdoor	Wynsome Cole	400 meters hurdles	4th	
Men's	1998 Indoor	Dion Trowers	55 meters hurdles	5th	
Men's	1998 Indoor	Tony Branch	4 × 400 meters relay	6th	
Men's	1998 Indoor	Chris Davis	4 × 400 meters relay	6th	
Men's	1998 Indoor	Edward Rozell	4 × 400 meters relay	6th	
Men's	1998 Indoor	Bashir Yamini	4 × 400 meters relay	6th	
Men's	1998 Indoor	Bashir Yamini	Long jump	1st	
Men's	1998 Outdoor	Bashir Yamini	Long jump	3rd	
Men's	1998 Outdoor	Jeremy Allen	Discus throw	6th	
Men's	1999 Outdoor	Tony Branch	4 × 400 meters relay	4th	
Men's	1999 Outdoor	Tim Dwight	4 × 400 meters relay	4th	
Men's	1999 Outdoor	Tim Dodge	4 × 400 meters relay	4th	
Men's	1999 Outdoor	Bashir Yamini	4 × 400 meters relay	4th	
Men's	2000 Indoor	Stetson Steele	5000 meters	4th	
Men's	2000 Indoor	Jeremy Allen	Shot put	8th	
Men's	2000 Outdoor	Stetson Steele	10,000 meters	5th	
Men's	2001 Outdoor	Jeremy Allen	Discus throw	5th	
Men's	2002 Indoor	James Costello	Weight throw	8th	
Men's	2002 Outdoor	Bill Neumann	Javelin throw	3rd	
Men's	2003 Outdoor	Bill Neumann	Javelin throw	3rd	
Women's	2004 Outdoor	Shellene Williams	400 meters	6th	
Women's	2005 Indoor	Kineke Alexander	400 meters	6th	
Women's	2005 Indoor	Peaches Roach	High jump	6th	
Women's	2005 Outdoor	Kineke Alexander	400 meters	7th	
Women's	2006 Indoor	Kineke Alexander	400 meters	1st	
Women's	2006 Indoor	Peaches Roach	High jump	6th	
Women's	2006 Outdoor	Kineke Alexander	400 meters	2nd	
Women's	2006 Outdoor	Peaches Roach	High jump	4th	
Women's	2007 Indoor	Kineke Alexander	400 meters	2nd	
Women's	2007 Indoor	Meghan Armstrong	Mile run	8th	
Women's	2007 Outdoor	Kineke Alexander	400 meters	6th	
Women's	2007 Outdoor	Diane Nukuri-Johnson	10,000 meters	7th	
Women's	2007 Outdoor	Peaches Roach	High jump	7th	
Men's	2008 Indoor	John Hickey	Shot put	7th	
Women's	2008 Indoor	Kineke Alexander	400 meters	5th	
Women's	2008 Outdoor	Kineke Alexander	400 meters	8th	
Women's	2008 Outdoor	Meghan Armstrong	10,000 meters	6th	
Women's	2008 Outdoor	Racheal Marchand	10,000 meters	8th	
Women's	2008 Outdoor	Tammilee Kerr	Heptathlon	8th	
Women's	2009 Indoor	Karessa Farley	60 meters hurdles	6th	
Women's	2009 Indoor	Racheal Marchand	5000 meters	3rd	
Men's	2010 Outdoor	Patrick Richards	4 × 400 meters relay	7th	
Men's	2010 Outdoor	Steven Willey	4 × 400 meters relay	7th	
Men's	2010 Outdoor	Erik Sowinski	4 × 400 meters relay	7th	
Men's	2010 Outdoor	Chris Barton	4 × 400 meters relay	7th	
Men's	2011 Indoor	Justin Austin	200 meters	5th	
Men's	2011 Indoor	Erik Sowinski	800 meters	4th	
Men's	2011 Indoor	Jeff Thode	Mile run	6th	
Men's	2011 Indoor	Patrick Richards	4 × 400 meters relay	4th	
Men's	2011 Indoor	Ethan Holmes	4 × 400 meters relay	4th	
Men's	2011 Indoor	Erik Sowinski	4 × 400 meters relay	4th	
Men's	2011 Indoor	Steven Willey	4 × 400 meters relay	4th	
Men's	2011 Indoor	Troy Doris	Triple jump	6th	
Women's	2011 Indoor	Bethany Praska	800 meters	7th	
Men's	2011 Outdoor	Troy Doris	Triple jump	5th	
Men's	2012 Indoor	Erik Sowinski	800 meters	3rd	
Men's	2012 Indoor	Troy Doris	Triple jump	4th	
Men's	2012 Outdoor	Erik Sowinski	800 meters	2nd	
Men's	2012 Outdoor	Troy Doris	Triple jump	5th	
Men's	2013 Outdoor	Justin Austin	200 meters	6th	
Men's	2013 Outdoor	Tevin-Cee Mincy	4 × 100 meters relay	6th	
Men's	2013 Outdoor	Justin Austin	4 × 100 meters relay	6th	
Men's	2013 Outdoor	Ethan Holmes	4 × 100 meters relay	6th	
Men's	2013 Outdoor	Josh Larney	4 × 100 meters relay	6th	
Men's	2013 Outdoor	Klyvens Delaunay	Triple jump	8th	
Men's	2014 Outdoor	Tevin-Cee Mincy	4 × 100 meters relay	6th	
Men's	2014 Outdoor	O'Shea Wilson	4 × 100 meters relay	6th	
Men's	2014 Outdoor	James Harrington	4 × 100 meters relay	6th	
Men's	2014 Outdoor	Keith Brown	4 × 100 meters relay	6th	
Women's	2014 Outdoor	Zinnia Miller	Long jump	8th	
Men's	2015 Indoor	Aaron Mallett	60 meters hurdles	6th	
Men's	2015 Outdoor	Aaron Mallett	110 meters hurdles	5th	
Men's	2016 Indoor	Aaron Mallett	60 meters hurdles	3rd	
Men's	2017 Indoor	Aaron Mallett	60 meters hurdles	8th	
Men's	2017 Indoor	Emmanuel Ogwo	4 × 400 meters relay	5th	
Men's	2017 Indoor	Collin Hofacker	4 × 400 meters relay	5th	
Men's	2017 Indoor	DeJuan Frye	4 × 400 meters relay	5th	
Men's	2017 Indoor	Mar'yea Harris	4 × 400 meters relay	5th	
Women's	2017 Indoor	Brittany Brown	200 meters	5th	
Men's	2017 Outdoor	Aaron Mallett	110 meters hurdles	4th	
Men's	2017 Outdoor	DeJuan Frye	4 × 400 meters relay	3rd	
Men's	2017 Outdoor	Mar'yea Harris	4 × 400 meters relay	3rd	
Men's	2017 Outdoor	Collin Hofacker	4 × 400 meters relay	3rd	
Men's	2017 Outdoor	Emmanuel Ogwo	4 × 400 meters relay	3rd	
Men's	2017 Outdoor	Reno Tuufuli	Discus throw	5th	
Women's	2017 Outdoor	Brittany Brown	200 meters	7th	
Women's	2017 Outdoor	Laulauga Tausaga-Collins	Discus throw	7th	
Women's	2018 Indoor	Briana Guillory	400 meters	6th	
Women's	2018 Indoor	Jahisha Thomas	Long jump	5th	
Men's	2018 Outdoor	Mar'yea Harris	400 meters	4th	
Men's	2018 Outdoor	Reno Tuufuli	Discus throw	5th	
Women's	2018 Outdoor	Jahisha Thomas	Long jump	3rd	
Women's	2018 Outdoor	Jahisha Thomas	Triple jump	6th	
Women's	2018 Outdoor	Laulauga Tausaga-Collins	Shot put	4th	
Women's	2018 Outdoor	Laulauga Tausaga-Collins	Discus throw	4th	
Men's	2019 Indoor	Chris Douglas	60 meters hurdles	6th	
Men's	2019 Indoor	Karayme Bartley	200 meters	6th	
Men's	2019 Indoor	Collin Hofacker	4 × 400 meters relay	6th	
Men's	2019 Indoor	Karayme Bartley	4 × 400 meters relay	6th	
Men's	2019 Indoor	Wayne Lawrence Jr.	4 × 400 meters relay	6th	
Men's	2019 Indoor	Mar'yea Harris	4 × 400 meters relay	6th	
Women's	2019 Indoor	Briana Guillory	400 meters	6th	
Women's	2019 Indoor	Laulauga Tausaga-Collins	Weight throw	5th	
Men's	2019 Outdoor	Wayne Lawrence Jr.	4 × 400 meters relay	4th	
Men's	2019 Outdoor	Antonio Woodard	4 × 400 meters relay	4th	
Men's	2019 Outdoor	Karayme Bartley	4 × 400 meters relay	4th	
Men's	2019 Outdoor	Mar'yea Harris	4 × 400 meters relay	4th	
Women's	2019 Outdoor	Laulauga Tausaga-Collins	Discus throw	1st	
Men's	2021 Indoor	Jamal Britt	60 meters hurdles	2nd	
Men's	2021 Outdoor	Jaylan McConico	110 meters hurdles	2nd	
Men's	2021 Outdoor	Jamal Britt	110 meters hurdles	4th	
Men's	2021 Outdoor	Austin Lietz	4 × 400 meters relay	5th	
Men's	2021 Outdoor	Antonio Woodard	4 × 400 meters relay	5th	
Men's	2021 Outdoor	Julien Gillum	4 × 400 meters relay	5th	
Men's	2021 Outdoor	Wayne Lawrence Jr.	4 × 400 meters relay	5th	
Men's	2021 Outdoor	Will Daniels	Decathlon	7th	
Women's	2021 Outdoor	Laulauga Tausaga-Collins	Shot put	6th	
Women's	2021 Outdoor	Laulauga Tausaga-Collins	Discus throw	2nd	
Men's	2022 Indoor	Jenoah McKiver	400 meters	2nd	
Men's	2022 Indoor	Chadrick Richards	400 meters	6th	
Men's	2022 Indoor	Wayne Lawrence, Jr.	400 meters	7th	
Men's	2022 Indoor	Tyler Lienau	Weight throw	8th	
Women's	2022 Indoor	Mariel Bruxvoort	4 × 400 meters relay	8th	
Women's	2022 Indoor	Tesa Roberts	4 × 400 meters relay	8th	
Women's	2022 Indoor	Payton Wensel	4 × 400 meters relay	8th	
Women's	2022 Indoor	Mallory King	4 × 400 meters relay	8th	
Men's	2022 Outdoor	Everett Steward	4 × 400 meters relay	7th	
Men's	2022 Outdoor	Chadrick Richards	4 × 400 meters relay	7th	
Men's	2022 Outdoor	Spencer Gudgel	4 × 400 meters relay	7th	
Men's	2022 Outdoor	Julien Gillum	4 × 400 meters relay	7th	
Men's	2022 Outdoor	Nik Curtiss	Shot put	8th	
Men's	2022 Outdoor	Jordan Johnson	Discus throw	8th	
Men's	2022 Outdoor	Austin West	Decathlon	5th	
Men's	2023 Indoor	Peyton Haack	Heptathlon	5th	
Men's	2023 Outdoor	Austin West	Decathlon	3rd	
Men's	2024 Indoor	Kalen Walker	60 meters	2nd	
Men's	2024 Indoor	Rivaldo Marshall	800 meters	1st	
Men's	2024 Indoor	Austin West	Heptathlon	6th	
Men's	2024 Outdoor	Mike Stein	Javelin throw	7th	

== See also ==
- Category:Iowa Hawkeyes men's track and field athletes (47)
- Category:Iowa Hawkeyes women's track and field athletes (8)
