= 1920–21 NCAA season =

1920–21 NCAA championships
Tournament information
- Dates: August 1920–June 1921

Tournament statistics
- Sports: 1
- Championships: 1

The 1920–21 NCAA season was the inaugural season of official NCAA sponsorship of team and individual national championships for college athletics in the United States, coinciding with the 1920–21 collegiate academic school year.

During the inaugural season, only one sport was sponsored: men's track and field.

Before the introduction of the separate University Division and College Division before the 1955–56 school year, the NCAA only conduced a single national championship for each sport. Women's sports were not added until 1981–82.

== Championships ==
| Sport/Event | Championship | Edition | Finals Site Host(s) | Date(s) | Team Champion(s) |
|---|---|---|---|---|---|
| Track and Field | 1921 NCAA Track and Field Championships | 1st | Stagg Field; Chicago, Illinois; University of Chicago | June 17–18, 1921 | Illinois (1st) |

== Season results ==
=== Team titles, by university ===
| Rank | University | Titles |
|---|---|---|
| 1 | Illinois | 1 |
