= Flint Hanner =

American javelin thrower (1898–1973)

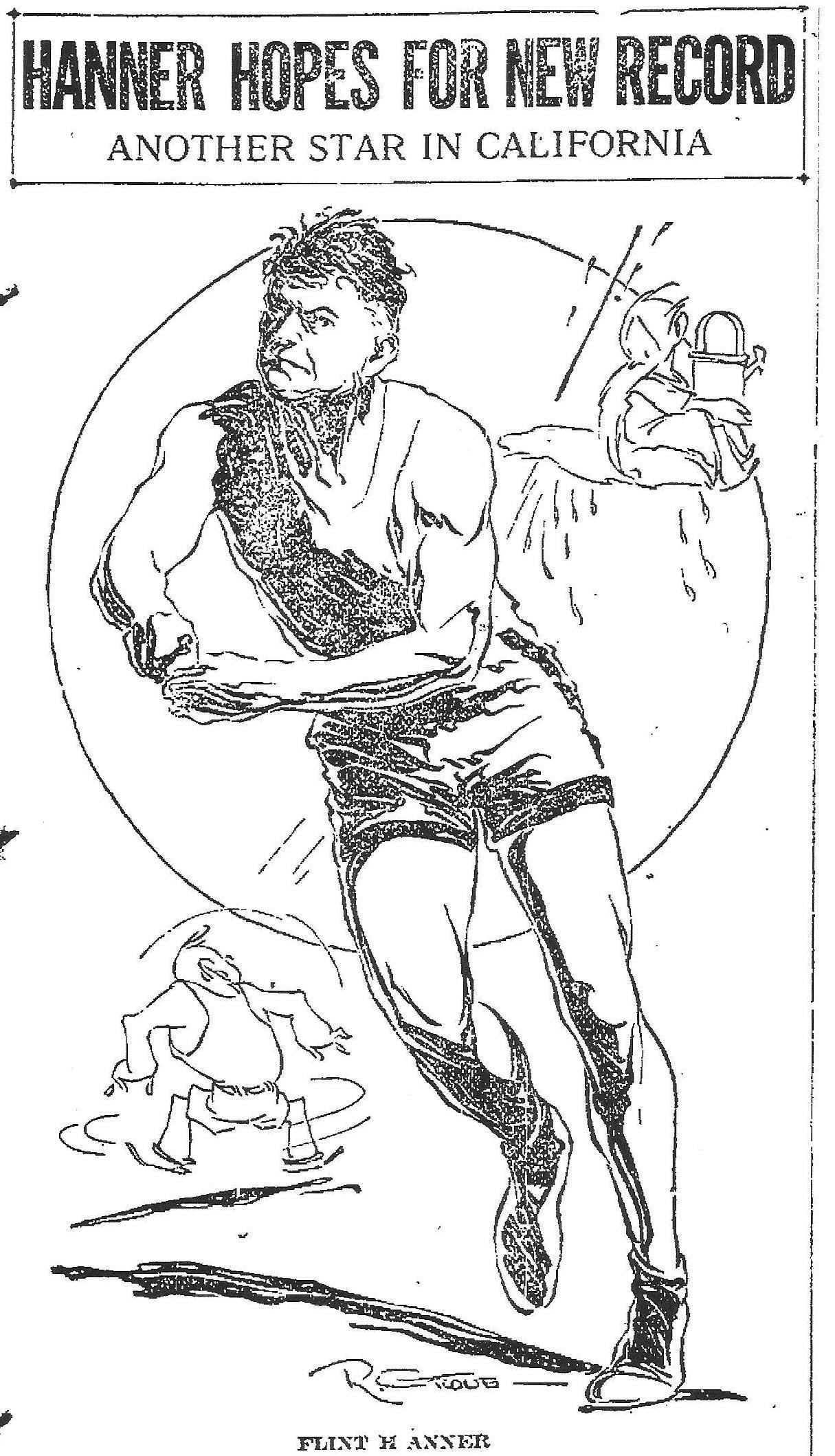
- Newspaper cartoon of Hanner, March 1922
- Born: May 21, 1898; Greensboro, North Carolina, U.S.
- Died: September 14, 1973 (aged 75); Fresno, California, U.S.
- Known for: NCAA champion, javelin (1921)

John Flint Hanner (May 21, 1898 – September 14, 1973) was an American track and field athlete and coach. He qualified for the 1920 Summer Olympics, won the first NCAA javelin championship in 1921 and later worked as the track coach at Fresno State University for 35 years. He was also one of the founders and the long-time director of the West Coast Relays.

== Biography ==
Hanner was a native of Greensboro, North Carolina. He attended Stanford University, where he competed for the university's track team. He competed in the discus, shot put and javelin throw, but the event in which he excelled was the javelin throw. Hanner won three national intercollegiate javelin championships in the event.

Hanner qualified for the 1920 U.S. Summer Olympic team in the javelin throw, finishing fourth in the Olympic Trials with a throw of 172 feet 5 inches, but he did not compete. The U.S. sent six javelin throwers to the Olympics in Belgium, but at most four athletes from a single country were allowed in any event. Curiously, the two U.S. javelin throwers who did not compete in that event finished third and fourth in the Trials. Nevertheless, Hanner's Olympic experience was of some benefit. His college coach later said that Hanner improved his throw by 10 feet through careful observation of "a peculiarity of the [winning] Finns' form."

In June 1921, Stanford sent Hanner to the first NCAA track and field championships, in Chicago. He was the only athlete that Stanford sent to the NCAA meet, leading the press to call him a "one-man team." Hanner won the first NCAA javelin championship with a throw of 191 feet, 2¼ inches.

In 1922, Hanner was captain of Stanford's track team and set a new event record at the AAU meet with a throw of 193 feet, 2¼ inches. He also threw the javelin 206 feet in a practice session in April 1922. That same spring, Hanner set a new American and intercollegiate record with a throw of 197 feet, 1 inch. After Hanner set the record, syndicated sports columnist Billy Evans wrote a column comparing Hanner to other sports champions from California:

"Experts look for Hanner to perform some record-breaking stunts with the weights. Hanner, a member of the Olympic team, already holds the western and intercollegiate record for javelin throwing ..."

In 1925, Hanner was hired as a track coach at Fresno State University, a position he held for 35 years until 1960. He remained active as Fresno State's assistant athletic director until his retirement in 1964. Hanner's Fresno State track teams won 27 championships in the Far Western Conference and California Collegiate Athletic Association. The most notable athlete coached by Hanner was Cornelius Warmerdam—the first person to clear 15 feet in the pole vault and the world record holder in the event from 1940 to 1957. He served as the president of the National Collegiate Track Coaches Association from 1948 to 1949.

In 1927, Hanner helped found the West Coast Relays and won the javelin event with a throw of 198 feet, 2½ inches. He served as the director of the West Coast Relays for 17 years from 1947 to 1964.

During his 39 years at Fresno State, Hanner also coached the school's football team, served as an assistant athletic director and coached the basketball team from 1929 to 1932 and 1944 to 1945.

Hanner has been inducted into the U.S. Track and Field Coaches Association Hall of Fame. He was also inducted into the Helms Athletic Hall of Fame in 1952 and the Northern California Track and Field Hall of Fame in 1964.

Hanner suffered a stroke in 1973 and died at Fresno Community Hospital at age 75.

== See also ==
- 1921 NCAA Men's Track and Field Championships
