= Bashir Yamini =

American gridiron football player (born 1977)

No. 84, 18, 10
- Position: Wide receiver

Personal information
- Born: September 10, 1977 (age 49); Dolton, Illinois
- Listed height: 6 ft 3 in (1.91 m)
- Listed weight: 190 lb (86 kg)

Career information
- High school: Dolton (IL) Thornridge
- College: Iowa
- NFL draft: 2000: undrafted

Career history
- Denver Broncos (2000)*; Tennessee Titans (2000); Dallas Cowboys (2001); Carolina Panthers (2002–2003)*; Ottawa Renegades (2004-2005)
- * Offseason or practice squad member only
- Stats at Pro Football Reference

Bashir Jihad Yamini (born September 10, 1977) is an American former football wide receiver. He played for the Tennessee Titans in 2000.

== Biography ==
Yamini was an accomplished track and field athlete at the University of Iowa from 1996-1999. Competing for the Iowa Hawkeyes track and field team, Yamini won the 1998 long jump at the NCAA Division I Indoor Track and Field Championships with a jump of 7.93 meters. He played football for the Hawkeyes from 1997-1999. He didn’t make a catch in 1997. In the 1998 season, he finished the year with 31 receptions for 317 yards and no touchdowns. In the 1999 season, he finished with 26 receptions for 348 yards and one touchdown.

Yamini was signed on April 17, 2000, by the Denver Broncos after going undrafted in the 2000 NFL draft. He was waived by the Broncos and then acquired by the Tennessee Titans on August 29, 2000. He only appeared in six games that season, and wasn’t a starter. He was targeted once throughout the season. He also played for the Dallas Cowboys and the Carolina Panthers, but never in a regular season game for either team. He had a brief stint with the Ottawa Renegades in 2004 and was signed again on February 10, 2005. He was released by the Renegades as a part of their final roster cuts on June 18, 2005.
