= 1922–23 NCAA season =

College athletics season in the USA

Tournament information
- Dates: August 1922–June 1923

Tournament statistics
- Sports: 1
- Championships: 1

The 1922–23 NCAA season was the third season of official NCAA sponsorship of team and individual national championships for college athletics in the United States, coinciding with the 1922–23 collegiate academic school year.

Only one sport was sponsored: men's track and field.

Before the introduction of the separate University and College Divisions during the 1955–56 school year, the NCAA only conducted a single national championship for each sport. Women's sports were not added until 1981–82.

== Championships ==
Sport/Event	Championship	Edition	Finals Site Host(s)	Date(s)	Team Champion(s)
Track and Field	1923 NCAA Track and Field Championships	3rd	Stagg Field; Chicago, Illinois; University of Chicago	June 1923	Michigan (1st)

== Season results ==
=== Team titles, by university ===
Rank	University	Titles
1	Michigan	1

== Cumulative results ==
=== Team titles, by university ===
Rank	University	Titles
1	California; Illinois; Michigan	1
