= Longino Welch =

American pole vaulter

- Born: 12 March 1900; Covington County, Mississippi
- Died: May 1969 (aged 69); Hattiesburg, Mississippi
- Known for: NCAA champion, pole vault (1921)

Houston Longino Welch (12 March 1900 - May 1969) was an American track and field athlete for Georgia Tech. A native of Covington County, Mississippi, he won the pole vault competition at the first NCAA track and field championships in 1921 with a jump of 12 feet. Welch graduated from Georgia Tech in 1923 with a degree in electrical engineering.

After graduating from Georgia Tech, Welch worked with various companies in the 1920s. In 1929, he joined Mississippi Power. He began in the company's Gulfport office before transferring to Hattiesburg in 1935.

He was inducted into the Georgia Tech Athletics Hall of Fame in 1966.

Welch died in 1969 at age 69 at his home in Hattiesburg.

== See also ==
- 1921 NCAA Men's Track and Field Championships
