= Bill Reilly (runner) =

American steeplechase runner

William L. Reilly (born February 28, 1943, in Long Branch, New Jersey) is an American steeplechase runner who competed in the 1968 Summer Olympics.

Reilly was an All-American runner for the Penn State Nittany Lions track and field team, running on their 5th-place 4 × 800 meters relay relay at the 1965 NCAA indoor track and field championships.

== See also ==
- List of Pennsylvania State University Olympians
