= 1921–22 NCAA season =

Tournament information
- Dates: August 1921–June 1922

Tournament statistics
- Sports: 1
- Championships: 1

The 1921–22 NCAA season was the second season of official NCAA sponsorship of team and individual national championships for college athletics in the United States, coinciding with the 1921–22 collegiate academic school year.

Only one sport was sponsored: men's track and field.

Before the introduction of the separate University Division and College Division before the 1955–56 school year, the NCAA only conduced a single national championship for each sport. Women's sports were not added until 1981–82.

== Championships ==
Sport/Event	Championship	Edition	Finals Site Host(s)	Date(s)	Team Champion(s)
Track and Field	1922 NCAA Track and Field Championships	2nd	Stagg Field; Chicago, Illinois; University of Chicago	June 16–17, 1922	California (1st)

== Season results ==
=== Team titles, by university ===
Rank	University	Titles
1	California	1

== Cumulative results ==
=== Team titles, by university ===
Rank	University	Titles
1	California; Illinois	1
