= 1922 NCAA Track and Field Championships =

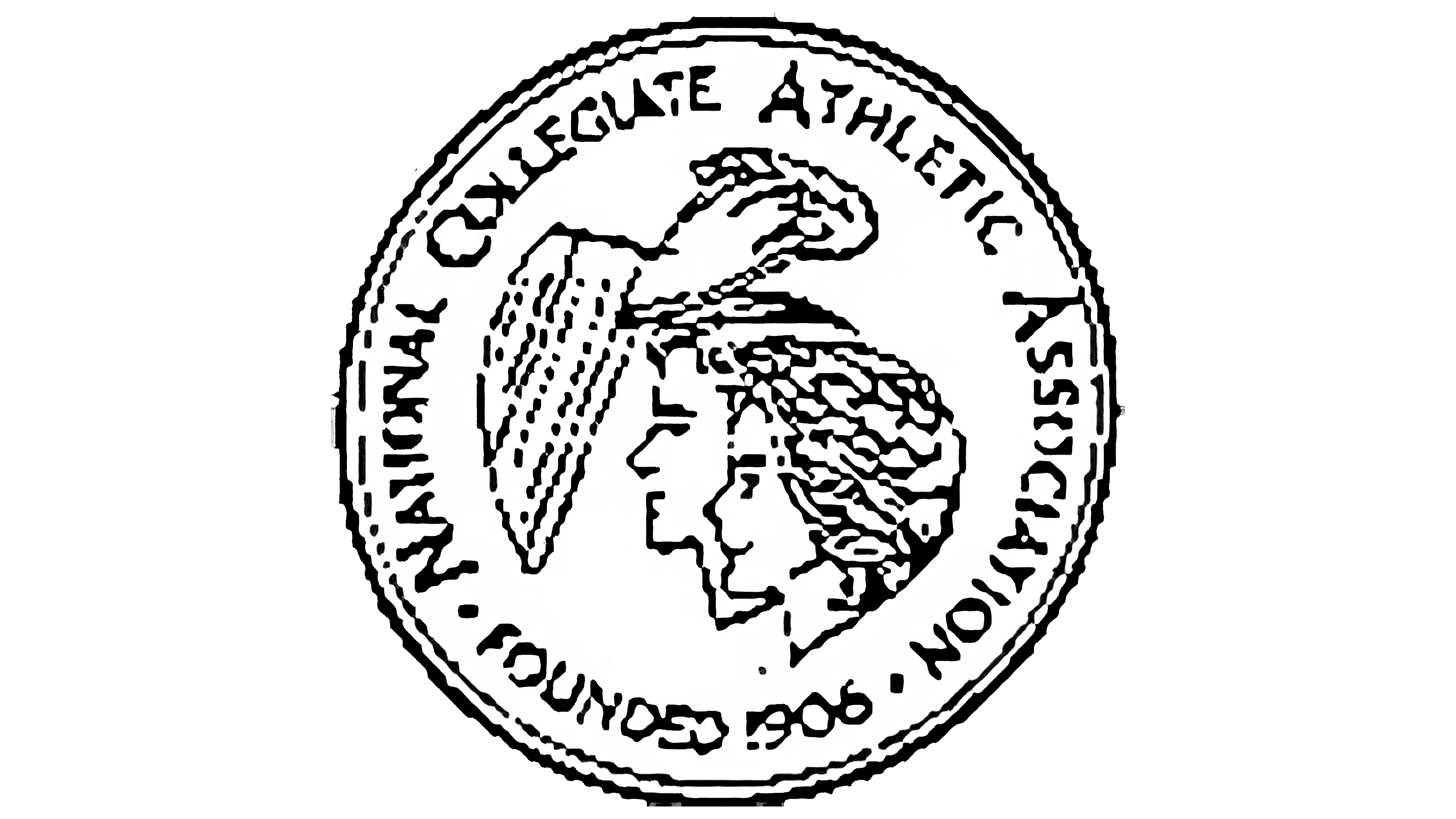
- Men's Champion: California (1st title)
- Edition: 2nd
- Dates: June 16–17, 1922
- Host city: (Illinois) Chicago, Illinois; University of Chicago
- Venue: Stagg Field
- Events: 14

The 1922 NCAA Track and Field Championships was the second NCAA track and field championship. The event was held at Stagg Field in Chicago, Illinois in June 1922. The University of California won the team title, and nine NCAA records were set at the two-day meet.

== Overview ==
The 1922 NCAA Track and Field Championships were held at Stagg Field in Chicago on June 16 and 17, 1923. The University of California won the team championship with 28 1/18 points. Penn State finished in second place with 19 1/2 points.

New NCAA records were set in nine events at the meet: 100-yard (91 m) dash, 220-yard (200 m) dash, low hurdles, mile, broad jump, discus, hammer throw, javelin and pole vault.

== Team result ==
- (H) = Hosts

Rank	Team	Points
1st place, gold medalist(s)	California	28 1/8
2nd place, silver medalist(s)	Penn State	19 1/2
3rd place, bronze medalist(s)	Notre Dame	16 7/10
4	Illinois	15 7/10
5	Iowa	11 34/35
6	Grinnell; Michigan	10
7	Penn	9
8	Georgetown	8
9	Ole Miss	7

== Track events ==
100-yard dash
1. Leonard Paulu, Grinnell – 9.9 seconds (new NCAA record)
2. Hayes, Notre Dame
3. Erwin, Kansas Aggies
4. Eric Wilson, Iowa
5. Smith, Nebraska

120-yard high hurdles
1. Barron, Penn State – 15.4 seconds
2. Coow, Wesleyan Union
3. Ivey, Earlham
4. Brickman, Chicago
5. Sargent, Michigan

220-yard dash
1. Leonard Paulu, Grinnell – 21.8 seconds (new NCAA record)
2. Eric Wilson, Iowa
3. Spetz, Wisconsin
4. Hayes, Notre Dame
5. Erwin, Kansas Aggies

220-yard low hurdles
1. Charles Brookins, Iowa – 25.2 (new NCAA record)
2. Desch, Notre Dame
3. Ellis, Mississippi A&M
4. Stolley, Wisconsin
5. Barron, Penn State

440-yard dash
1. Commodore Cochran, Mississippi A&M (Mississippi State)- 49.7 seconds
2. McDonald, California
3. Fessenden, Illinois
4. Pyott, Chicago
5. Brickman, Chicago

880-yard run
1. Helffrick, Penn State - 1:58.1 seconds
2. Brown, Penn
3. Morrow, Iowa
4. Hales, Illinois
5. Gardner, Nebraska

One-mile run
1. Shields, Penn State – 4:20.4 (new NCAA record)
2. Patterson, Illinois
3. Connolly, Georgetown
4. Wickoff, Ohio State
5. Furnas, Purdue

Two-mile run
1. Rathbun, Iowa State – 9:32.1
2. Doolittle, Butler
3. Thompson, Hamilton College
4. Schuyler Enck, Penn State
5. Swanson, Illinois

== Field events ==
Broad jump
1. Legendre, Georgetown – 24 ft 3 in (7.39 m) (new NCAA record)
2. Muller, California
3. Jones, Depauw
4. Merchant, California
5. Osborne, Illinois

High jump
1. Osborne, Illinois – 6 ft 2 5/8 in (1.895 m)
1. Murphy, Notre Dame – 6 ft 2 5/8 in (1.895 m)
3. Muller, California
4. Clark, Amherst
4. Treyer, California
4. Darling, Amherst
4. Campbell, Minnesota
4. Hoffman, Iowa
4. Turner, Nebraska
4. Jones, Depauw
4. Woods, Butler
4. Platten, Wisconsin
4. Shideker, Chicago

Pole vault
1. John Landowski, Michigan – 12 ft 6 in (3.81 m)
1. Norris, California – 12 ft 6 in (3.81 m)
3. A. Devine, Iowa
3. Rogers, Kansas
3. Merrick, Wisconsin
3. Hogan, Notre Dame
3. Collins, Illinois

Discus throw
1. Thomas Lieb, Notre Dame – 144 ft 2 1/2 in (43.955 m) (new NCAA record)
2. MacGowan, Montana
3. Gross, Minnesota
4. Muller, California
5. Friday, Chicago

Javelin
1. Howard Hoffman, Michigan – 202 ft 3 in (61.65 m) (new NCAA record)
2. Bronder, Penn
3. Sorrell, California
4. Angler, Illinois
5. Welchel, Georgia Tech

Shot put
1. Merchant, California – 44 ft 1/2 in (13.424 m)
2. Bronder, Penn
3. Witter, California
4. Hulscher, Western State Normal (Western Michigan)
5. Keen, Texas A&M

Hammer throw
1. Merchant, California – 161 ft 4 in (49.17 m) (new NCAA record)
2. Palm, Penn State
3. Hill, Illinois
4. White, Ohio State
5. Carl Schmidt, Michigan

== See also ==
- NCAA Men's Outdoor Track and Field Championship
- 1921–22 NCAA championships
