= Eric Wilson (sprinter) =

American athlete

Personal information
- Born: October 8, 1900 Iowa City, Iowa, United States
- Died: July 2, 1985 (aged 84) Iowa City, Iowa, United States

Sport
- Country: United States
- Sport: Track
- Event: Long sprints
- College team: Iowa

Eric Colquhoun Wilson (October 8, 1900 – July 2, 1985) was an American track and field athlete. He won the first NCAA championship in the 220-yard dash in 1921 and competed for the United States in the 1924 Summer Olympics. He was the sports information director at the University of Iowa from 1923 to 1968.

== Biography ==
Wilson was born in Iowa City, Iowa in 1900. He was the son of a professor at the University of Iowa. He enrolled at the University of Iowa and became one of the most accomplished athletes in the school's history. Wilson was a sprinter who won two NCAA championships and two Big Ten Conference championships while competing for the Iowa track team.

Wilson's first NCAA championship came in 1921. He won the 220-yard dash at the first NCAA track and field championships in 1921 with a time of 22.6 seconds. At the 1922 NCAA Men's Track and Field Championships, Wilson finished second in the 220-yard dash and fourth in the 100-yard dash. In 1923, Wilson won his second NCAA championship in the 220-yard dash with a time of 21.9 seconds.

Wilson was also the Big Ten Conference champion in the 220-yard dash in 1921 and 1923 and a member of the University of Iowa mile relay team that held the national intercollegiate record for seven years.

Wilson competed for the United States at the 1924 Summer Olympics in the 400-meter race. In qualifying meets leading up to the Olympics, Wilson had bettered the world record in the event with a time of 47.7—a time that would have been good for the silver medal in Paris. At the Olympic games in Paris, he failed to qualify for the finals, though his quarterfinal time of 48.8 would have placed him in fourth place had he run that time in the finals. The 400-meter competition at the 1924 Summer Olympics in Paris (won by Eric Liddell) was later depicted in the Academy Award-winning film Chariots of Fire.

In 1923, Wilson became the University of Iowa's first sports information director, a position he held for 45 years until his retirement in 1968. He died in Iowa City, Iowa in 1985 at age 84.

In 2006, Wilson was posthumously honored as part of the charter class of the University of Iowa's Kinnick Stadium Wall of Fame.

== See also ==
- 1921 NCAA Men's Track and Field Championships
- 1922 NCAA Men's Track and Field Championships
- 1923 NCAA Men's Track and Field Championships
- Athletics at the 1924 Summer Olympics – Men's 400 metres
