= Ryan Foster (runner) =

Australian middle-distance runner

Personal information
- Nationality: Australian
- Born: 26 August 1988 (age 38) Hobart, Tasmania

Sport
- Sport: Running
- Events: 800 metres, Mile

Achievements and titles
- Personal bests: 800 m: 1:46.78 s (Fayetteville, Arkansas 2009) Mile: 3:58.49 s (State College, Pennsylvania 2011)

Ryan Foster (born 26 August 1988) is an Australian middle distance runner and coach who specialises in the 800 metres.

== Biography ==
He graduated from Pennsylvania State University in 2011. He won four Big Ten 800 metres titles, was an All-American over 800 metres and the mile run. Ryan holds two Australian National records: the indoor 800 metres and the indoor 1000 metres, as well as five school records: indoor 800 metres, indoor 1000 metres, indoor mile, indoor distance medley relay, outdoor sprint medley relay. Ryan was also the first Tasmanian to break the 4-minute mile barrier.

== Personal best ==
| Distance | Time | venue |
|---|---|---|
| 800 m | 1:46.72 | Fayetteville, Arkansas (11 June 2009) |
| Mile | 3:58.49 | State College, Pennsylvania (29 January 2011) |

== Australian National records ==
| Distance | Time | venue |
|---|---|---|
| 800 m (Indoors) | 1:47.48 | State College, Pennsylvania (30 January 2010) |
| 1000 m (Indoors) | 2:19.60 | State College, Pennsylvania (16 January 2010) |

== Coaching career ==
In 2016, Foster was hired as the head cross country coach at Division II Edinboro University of Pennsylvania. Prior to Edinboro, he served as an assistant coach at Penn State. He would coach there for 2 seasons before joining the University of Tennessee as an assistant in 2018. In 2021, he decided to return to his alma mater to coach.

Notable athletes coached include Handal Roban.

== Notable teammates ==
- Casimir Loxsom
