= 1921 NCAA Track and Field Championships =

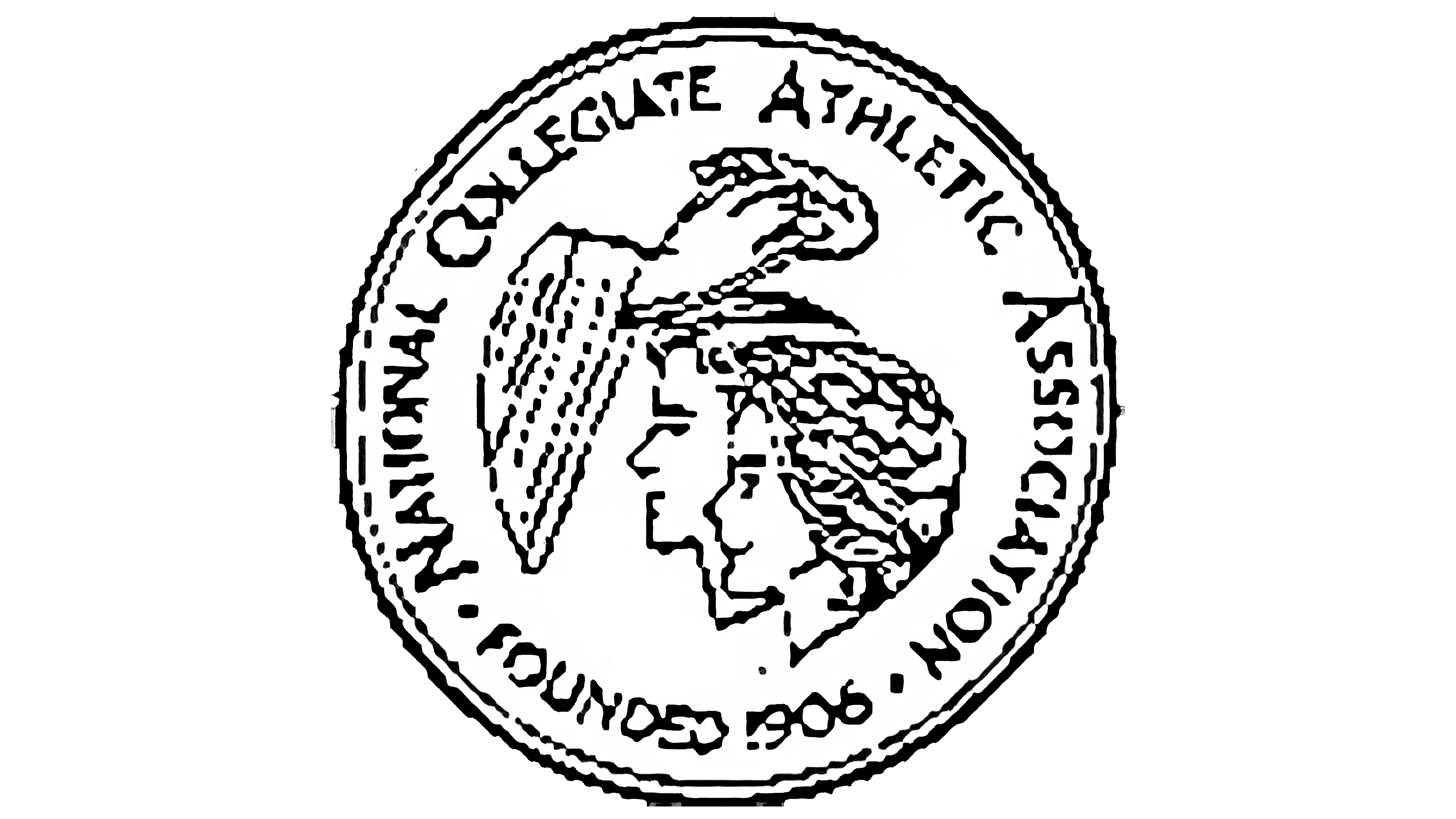
- Men's Champion: Illinois (1st title)
- Edition: 1st
- Dates: June 18, 1921
- Host city: (Illinois) Chicago, Illinois; University of Chicago
- Venue: Stagg Field
- Events: 14

The 1921 NCAA Track and Field Championships was the first NCAA track and field championship. The event was held at Stagg Field in Chicago, Illinois in June 1921. The University of Illinois won the team title.

== Overview ==
The 1921 NCAA Track and Field Championships were held at Stagg Field in Chicago on June 17 and 18, 1921. The University of Illinois won the team championship with 20 1/4 points. Notre Dame finished in second place.

Gus Pope of the University of Washington was the individual points leader with 10 points earned through first-place finishes in both the shot put and the discus.

== Results ==
=== Team standings ===
- Note: Top 10 only
- (H) = Hosts
- Full results

Rank	Team	Points
1st place, gold medalist(s)	Illinois	20 1/4
2nd place, silver medalist(s)	Notre Dame	16 3/4
3rd place, bronze medalist(s)	Iowa	14
4	Washington	12 1/4
5	Wisconsin	10
6	Nebraska	8
7	Grinnell	7
8	Northwestern; Ohio State	6
10	Ames College	5 1/2

== Track events ==
100-yard dash
Rank	Athlete	Nationality	Team	Time
1st place, gold medalist(s)	Leonard Paulu	United States	Grinnell Pioneers	10.0
2nd place, silver medalist(s)	Billy Hayes	United States	Notre Dame Fighting Irish	N/A
3rd place, bronze medalist(s)	Ed Smith		Nebraska Cornhuskers	N/A
4	Eric Wilson	United States	Iowa Hawkeyes	N/A
5	Vic Hurley		Washington Huskies	N/A

120-yard high hurdles
Rank	Athlete	Nationality	Team	Time	Notes
1st place, gold medalist(s)	Earl Thomson	Canada	Dartmouth Big Green	14.4	= WR
2nd place, silver medalist(s)	Harold Crawford		Iowa Hawkeyes	N/A	
3rd place, bronze medalist(s)	Karl Anderson	United States	Minnesota Golden Gophers	N/A	
4	Chet Wynn	United States	Notre Dame Fighting Irish	N/A	
5	Bill Coughlan	United States	Sewanee Tigers	N/A	University of the South

220-yard dash
Rank	Athlete	Nationality	Team	Time
1st place, gold medalist(s)	Eric Wilson	United States	Iowa Hawkeyes	22.6
2nd place, silver medalist(s)	Ed Smith		Nebraska Cornhuskers	N/A
3rd place, bronze medalist(s)	Leonard Paulu	United States	Grinnell Pioneers	N/A
4	Billy Hayes	United States	Notre Dame Fighting Irish	N/A
5	Harold King		Ohio Wesleyan Battling Bishops	N/A

220-yard low hurdles
Rank	Athlete	Nationality	Team	Time
1st place, gold medalist(s)	Gus Desch	United States	Notre Dame Fighting Irish	24.8
2nd place, silver medalist(s)	Al Kollin		Wisconsin Badgers	N/A
3rd place, bronze medalist(s)	Earl Frazier		Baylor Bears	N/A
4	Henry Wallace		Illinois Fighting Illini	N/A
5	Chet Wynn	United States	Notre Dame Fighting Irish	N/A

440-yard dash
Rank	Athlete	Nationality	Team	Time
1st place, gold medalist(s)	Frank Shea	United States	Pittsburgh Panthers	49.0
2nd place, silver medalist(s)	Lawrence Butler		Michigan Wolverines	N/A
3rd place, bronze medalist(s)	Philip Donohoe		Illinois Fighting Illini	N/A
4	James Pratt		Washington Huskies	N/A
5	Edward Johnson		Wisconsin Badgers	N/A

Half-mile run
Rank	Athlete	Nationality	Team	Time	Notes
1st place, gold medalist(s)	Earl Eby	United States	Penn Quakers	1:57.4	
2nd place, silver medalist(s)	Joseph Higgins		Iowa State Cyclones	N/A	Ames College
3rd place, bronze medalist(s)	Clyde Nash		Wisconsin Badgers	N/A	
4	Howard Yates		Illinois Fighting Illini	N/A	
5	Philip Donohoe		Illinois Fighting Illini	N/A	

One-mile run
Rank	Athlete	Nationality	Team	Time	Notes
1st place, gold medalist(s)	Ray Watson	United States	Kansas State Wildcats	4:23.4	Kansas Aggies
2nd place, silver medalist(s)	Gordon McGinnis		Illinois Fighting Illini	N/A	
3rd place, bronze medalist(s)	J. Mearl Sweitzer		Minnesota Golden Gophers	N/A	
4	Oscar Ferguson		Ohio State Buckeyes	N/A	
5	Stanley Graham		Iowa State Cyclones	N/A	Ames College

Two-mile run
Rank	Athlete	Nationality	Team	Time	Notes
1st place, gold medalist(s)	John Romig	United States	Penn State Nittany Lions	9:31	
2nd place, silver medalist(s)	John Wharton		Illinois Fighting Illini	N/A	
3rd place, bronze medalist(s)	Lloyd Rathbun		Iowa State Cyclones	N/A	Ames College
4	Ernie Canton		St. Olaf Oles	N/A	
5	George Finkle		Wisconsin Badgers	N/A	

== Field events ==
Broad jump
Rank	Athlete	Nationality	Team	Distance	
1st place, gold medalist(s)	Gaylord Stinchcomb	United States	Ohio State Buckeyes	23 ft 3 3/8 in	7.10 m
2nd place, silver medalist(s)	Joseph H. Sward		Knox	22 ft 9 in	6.93 m
2nd place, silver medalist(s)	Harold Osborn		Illinois Fighting Illini	22 ft 9 in	6.93 m
4	Guy Sundt	United States	Wisconsin Badgers	N/A	N/A
5	Dewey Alberts		Illinois Fighting Illini	N/A	N/A

High jump
Rank	Athlete	Nationality	Team	Height	
1st place, gold medalist(s)	Johnny Murphy	United States	Notre Dame Fighting Irish	6 ft 3 in	1.91 m
2nd place, silver medalist(s)	Dewey Alberts		Illinois Fighting Illini	N/A	N/A
3rd place, bronze medalist(s)	Edgar Hoffman		Iowa Hawkeyes	N/A	N/A
4	Chuck Frankland	United States	Washington Huskies	N/A	N/A
4	Harold Osborne	United States	Illinois Fighting Illini	N/A	N/A

Pole vault
Rank	Athlete	Nationality	Team	Height	
1st place, gold medalist(s)	Longino Welch	United States	Georgia Tech Yellow Jackets	12 ft	3.66 m
1st place, gold medalist(s)	Eldon Jenne	United States	Washington State Cougars	12 ft	3.66 m
1st place, gold medalist(s)	Lloyd Wilder		Wisconsin Badgers	12 ft	3.66 m
1st place, gold medalist(s)	Sam Gardner		Yale Bulldogs	12 ft	3.66 m
5	Dale Merrick		Wisconsin Badgers	N/A	N/A
5	Eddie Hogan		Notre Dame Fighting Irish	N/A	N/A

Discus throw
Rank	Athlete	Nationality	Team	Distance	
1st place, gold medalist(s)	Gus Pope	United States	Washington Huskies	142 ft 2 1/4 in	43.34 m
2nd place, silver medalist(s)	H. Chester Blackwood		Northwestern Wildcats	N/A	N/A
3rd place, bronze medalist(s)	Will Praeger		Kalamazoo Hornets	N/A	N/A
4	Duke Slater	United States	Iowa Hawkeyes	N/A	N/A
5	John Weiss		Illinois Fighting Illini	N/A	N/A

Javelin
Rank	Athlete	Nationality	Team	Distance	
1st place, gold medalist(s)	Flint Hanner	United States	Stanford Cardinal	191 ft 2 1/4 in	52.27 m
2nd place, silver medalist(s)	Art Tuck	United States	Oregon Ducks	N/A	N/A
3rd place, bronze medalist(s)	Howard Hoffman	United States	Michigan Wolverines	N/A	N/A
4	Jack Mahan	United States	Texas A&M Aggies	N/A	N/A
5	Eugene Oberst	United States	Notre Dame Fighting Irish	N/A	N/A

Shot put
Rank	Athlete	Nationality	Team	Distance		Notes
1st place, gold medalist(s)	Gus Pope	United States	Washington Huskies	45 ft 4 1/2 in	13.83 m	
2nd place, silver medalist(s)	Fred Dale	United States	Nebraska Cornhuskers	N/A	N/A	
3rd place, bronze medalist(s)	John Weiss		Illinois Fighting Illini	N/A	N/A	
4	Guy Lindsay		Rice Owls	N/A	N/A	Rice Institute
5	Buck Shaw	United States	Notre Dame Fighting Irish	N/A	N/A	

Hammer throw
Rank	Athlete	Nationality	Team	Distance		Notes
1st place, gold medalist(s)	Charles Redmon	United States	Chicago Maroons	133 ft 9 3/4 in	40.79 m	
2nd place, silver medalist(s)	H. Chester Blackwood		Northwestern Wildcats	N/A	N/A	
3rd place, bronze medalist(s)	Duke Slater	United States	Iowa Hawkeyes	N/A	N/A	
4	Fletcher Skidmore	United States	Sewanee Tigers	N/A	N/A	University of the South
5	Sam Hill		Illinois Fighting Illini	N/A	N/A	

== See also ==
- NCAA Men's Outdoor Track and Field Championship
