= Casimir Loxsom =

American middle-distance runner

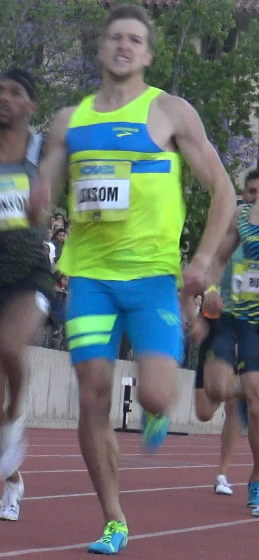
- Loxsom at the 2016 Hoka One One Middle Distance Classic

Personal information
- Nationality: American
- Born: March 17, 1991 (age 35) New Haven, Connecticut, U.S.
- Height: 5 ft 10 in (1.78 m)
- Weight: 155 lb (70 kg)

Sport
- Sport: Track
- Event: 800 meters
- College team: Penn State
- Coached by: Danny Mackey; John Nubani (agent)

Achievements and titles
- Personal bests: 400m: 47.56; 800m: 1:44.92; 1500m: 3:45.23
Medal record
Men's athletics
Representing the United States
World Relay Championships
Gold medal – first place	2017 Nassau	4×800 m relay
World Junior Championships
Silver medal – second place	2010 Moncton	800 m
- Updated on October 27, 2018

Casimir Loxsom (born March 17, 1991) is an American retired middle distance runner who specialized in the 800 metres. In addition to attending and running at Pennsylvania State University, Loxsom has represented the United States in international competition. Loxsom ran professionally for Brooks Beasts Track Club from 2013 until his retirement in 2018.

== Running career ==
=== High school ===
Loxsom attended Wilbur Cross High School, where he ran track and specialized in middle-distance running. In his senior year of high school, he ran his high school personal best in the 800 meters in 1:50.45 (min:sec) on May 9, 2009.

=== International and collegiate ===
At the 2010 World Junior Championships in Athletics in Moncton, Canada, Loxsom won a silver medal over 800 metres, becoming (along with bronze medalist Robby Andrews) the first American males to medal in a middle distance event at the world junior championships. Loxsom finished fourth in the final round of the men's 800-meter race at the 2011 Summer Universiade. At the 2012 NACAC U23 Championships, he finished in third overall in the 800 meters. Running for Penn State, Loxsom finished second in the 800 meters at the 2013 NCAA D1 Outdoor T&F Championships.

=== Professional ===
In Loxsom's first season as a professional with the Brooks Beasts TC he won three 800 meter races, Payton Jordan Invitational, Adrian Martinez Classic and Portland Track Festival. In the 2014 United States Track and Field Outdoor Championships, Loxsom finished second in the 800 meter final. Casimir finished 9th 2014 USA Indoor Track and Field Championships in 1:49.05.

In Loxsom's second full season with Brooks, Casimir won 600 meters in 1:15.33 an American record at 2015 USA Indoor Track and Field Championships. Casimir finished 3rd in the 800 meters at 2015 USA Outdoor Track and Field Championships. On August 22, Loxsom finished 38th in the heats 2015 World Championships in Athletics – Men's 800 metres.

In 2017, Loxsom set a new world best in the indoor 600m event with a time of 1:14.91. Isaiah Harris, who finished second in that race, also beat the existing world's best with a time of 1:14.96. Interestingly, this race took place only a week after Emmanuel Korir had established the record of 1:14.97A, having surpassed Nico Motchebon's record of 1:15.12 from 1999.

== Personal bests ==
As of 29 August 2019.

Event	Time	Venue	Date
400 m (outdoor)	47.56	Walnut, California	April 19, 2014
500 m (indoor)	1:01.28	State College	January 8, 2011
600 m (outdoor)	1:14.84	Burnaby, BC	July 1, 2013
600 m (indoor)	1:14.91	State College	January 28, 2017
800 m (outdoor)	1:44.92	Eugene	June 26, 2015
800 m (indoor)	1:46.13	Birmingham NIA	February 18, 2017
1000 m (outdoor)	2:19.16	Brussels, Belgium	September 5, 2014
1000 m (indoor)	2:21.06	New York, NY	February 11, 2017
1500 m (outdoor)	3:45.23	Portland, OR	June 14, 2015

== Notable teammates ==
- Ryan Foster
