= 1923 NCAA Track and Field Championships =

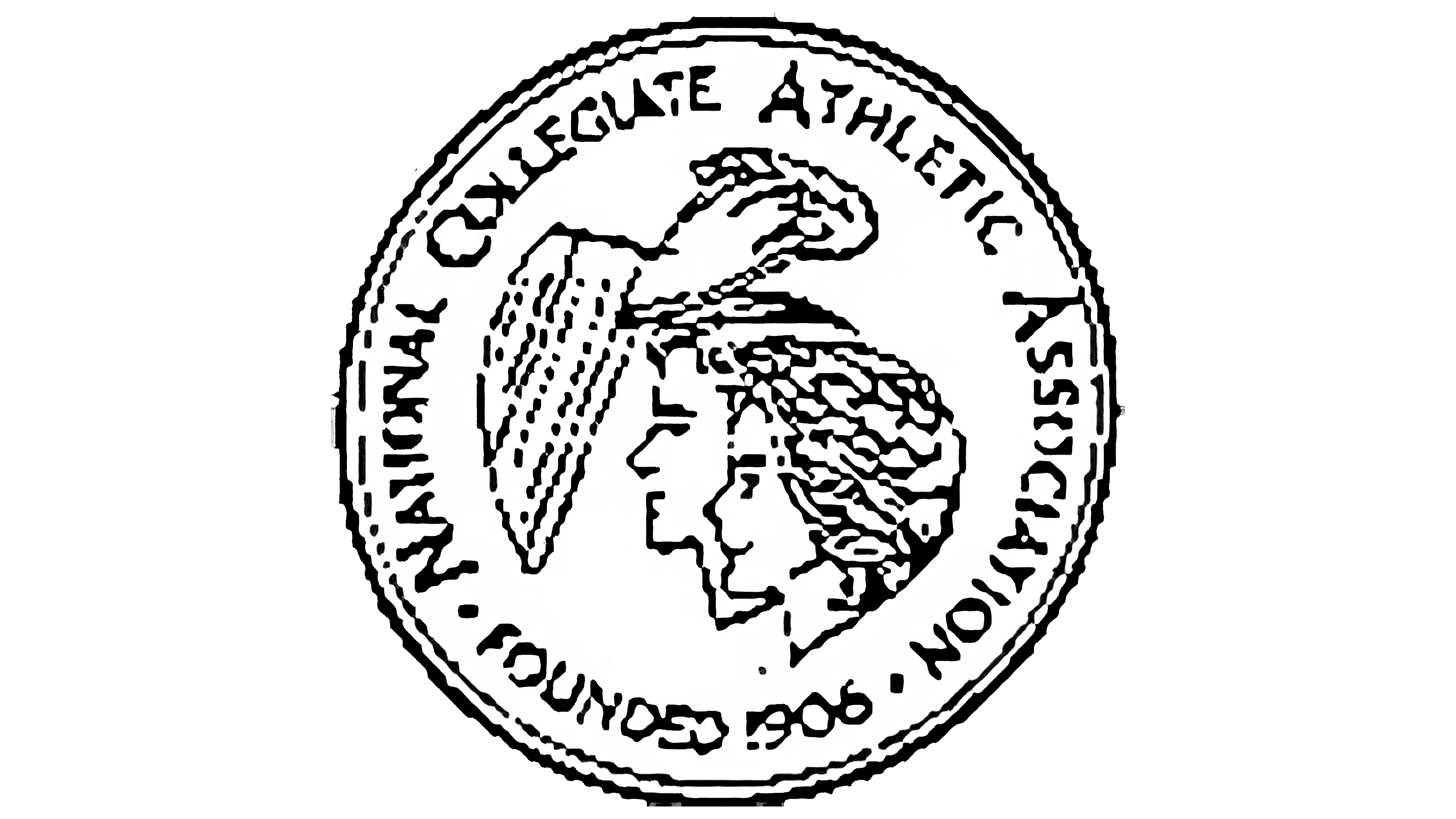
- Men's Champion: Michigan (1st title)
- Edition: 3rd
- Dates: June 15-16, 1923
- Host city: (Illinois) Chicago, Illinois; University of Chicago
- Venue: Stagg Field
- Events: 14

The 1923 NCAA Track and Field Championships was the third NCAA track and field championship. The event was held at Stagg Field in Chicago, Illinois in June 1923. The University of Michigan won the team title, and six NCAA records were set at the two-day meet.

== Overview ==
The 1923 NCAA Track and Field Championships were held at Stagg Field in Chicago on June 15 and 16, 1923. The University of Michigan won the team title, accumulating more than twice as many points as the second-place team. Michigan's dominant performance in the NCAA championships led the Associated Press to report:

"Seventeen men from the University of Michigan nailed the leaders' flag to their masthead today by scooping the championship track and field games of the national collegiate athletic association from a fighting array of picked men from sixty-two institutions of America. The Wolverine stars, with 31 points, far outdistanced the field, often leaving dust in the eyes of competitors with teams twice her size pitted against her."

Michigan's victory in the track and field championship was the school's seventh collegiate athletic championship in nine months. The Atlanta Constitution reported on the unusual accomplishment as follows:

"With the winning of the National Collegiate Athletic association championship track meet at Chicago last week, the University of Michigan brought to a close one of the most successful athletic years that has been the lot of any major institution in the country, winning a total of 7 championships in the 9 months of competition. ... Michigan's track team, in addition to winning the national collegiate meet, won the conference indoor and outdoor track titles and these, coupled with the cross country championship made four championships that were brought to Michigan by the track squad."

In the opening event of the meet, Charles Brookins of the University of Iowa set a new world record of 23.9 seconds in the 220-yard low hurdles around one turn.

Six NCAA records were set in the broad jump, pole vault, hammer throw, shot put, half-mile run and 220-yard low hurdles.

DeHart Hubbard, an African-American athlete competing for the University of Michigan, broke the NCAA record in the broad jump with a distance of 25 feet, 2 inches. He broke the previous NCAA mark by 13 inches. Hubbard's jump was one inch short of the world record set by E.O. Gourdin in 1921.

Anderson of the University of Southern California broke the NCAA record in the shot put with a toss of 46 feet, 8 inches.

== Team standings ==
- (H) = Hosts

Rank	Team	Points
1st place, gold medalist(s)	Michigan	31
2nd place, silver medalist(s)	Stanford	14 1/2
3rd place, bronze medalist(s)	Johns Hopkins; Iowa	14
5	Penn State	13 1/2
6	Illinois; Mississippi A&M	13
8	USC	12
9	Chicago (H)	11 1/10
10	Kansas State	8 1/2

== Track events ==
=== 100-yard dash ===
1. Louis Clarke, Johns Hopkins – 9.9 seconds (tied NCAA record)
2. Fred Tykle, Purdue
3. Lester Wittman, Michigan
4. Charles Brookins, Iowa
5. Anderwert, Washington University in St. Louis

=== 120-yard high hurdles ===
1. Ivan Riley, Kansas State Aggies (Kansas State) – 15.2 seconds
2. Hugo "Swede" Leistner, Stanford
3. Taylor, Grinnell
4. F. Johnson, Illinois
5. DeHart Hubbard, Michigan

=== 220-yard dash ===
1. Eric Wilson, Iowa – 21.9 seconds
2. Lou Clarke, Johns Hopkins
3. Erwin, Kansas State Aggies
4. Anderwert, Washington University in St. Louis
5. Lester Wittman, Michigan

=== 220-yard low hurdles ===
1. Charles Brookins, Iowa – 23.6 (new world record)
2. Taylor, Grinnell
3. O. Anderson, University of Southern California
4. Hugo "Swede" Leistner, Stanford
5. Frazier, Baylor

=== 440-yard dash ===
1. Commodore Cochran, Mississippi A&M (Mississippi State)- 49.2 seconds
2. T. Smith, Kalamazoo State Normal (Western Michigan)
3. Sweet, Illinois
4. Fitch, Illinois
5. Williamson, Stanford

=== Half-mile run ===
1. Alan Helffrich, Penn State – 1:56.5 (new NCAA record)
2. William Homer Hattendorf, Michigan
3. Schuyler Enck, Penn State
4. Jim Reese, Texas
5. Harry Morrow, Iowa

=== One-mile run ===
1. Schuyler Enck, Penn State – 4:27.4
2. Robbins, Wabash
3. Brandes, Hamlin College
4. Schneider, Wisconsin
5. Krogh, Chicago

=== Two-mile run ===
1. Verne Booth, Johns Hopkins – 9:32.2
2. Crippen, Northwestern
3. Egbert Isbell, Michigan
4. Bourke, Chicago
5. Phelps, Iowa

== Field events ==
=== Broad jump ===
1. DeHart Hubbard, Michigan – 25 feet, 2 inches (new NCAA record)
2. Van Arsdale, Wabash
3. Perry, Miami
4. F. Johnson, Illinois
4. O. Anderson, Univ. South. Calif.

=== High jump ===
1. Tom Poor, Kansas – 6 feet, 1 inch
2. Ray W. Smith, Michigan
2. Weeks, Notre Dame
2. Weatherdon, NYU
2. David MacEllven, Michigan
2. Dickson, Chicago

=== Pole vault ===
1. James Brooker, Michigan – 13 feet, 1 inch (new NCAA record)
1. McKowan, Kansas State Teachers – 13 feet, 1 inch (new NCAA record)
3. Rogers, Kansas
4. Hammann, Wisconsin
4. Rueherwain, YMCA College, Chicago
4. Kirkpatrick, YMCA College, Chicago
4. Mason, Washington

=== Discus throw ===
1. Thomas Lieb, Notre Dame – 143 feet, 4 inches
2. Gatchell, Mississippi A&M
3. Arthur, Stanford
4. N. Anderson, Univ. South. Calif.
5. Gross, Minnesota

=== Javelin ===
1. Harry Frieda, Chicago – 193 feet, 6 inches
2. Priester, Mississippi A&M – 189 feet, 9½ inches
3. Welchel, Georgia Tech – 187 feet, 9 inches
4. Schjoll, Minnesota – 184 feet, 8½ inches
5. Hartley, Nebraska – 178 feet, 3 inches

=== Shot put ===
1. Norman Anderson, Univ. South. Calif. – 40 feet, 6 inches (new NCAA record)
2. Beers, Maryland
3. Keen, Texas Aggies
4. Arthur, Stanford
5. Gross, Minnesota

=== Hammer throw ===
1. Fred Tootell, Bowdoin – 175 feet, 1 inch
2. Hill, Illinois
3. Howard Hindes, Michigan
4. Ludeke, Stanford
5. Carl Schmidt, Michigan

== See also ==
- NCAA Men's Outdoor Track and Field Championship
- 1922–23 NCAA championships
