= Howard Hoffman (athlete) =

American track and field athlete

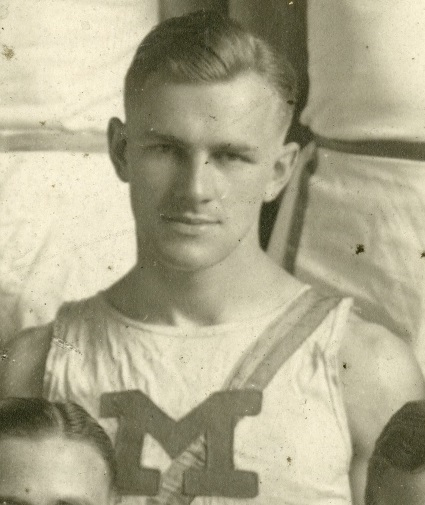
- Hoffman from team portrait of 1921 Michigan track team

Personal information
- Full name: Howard Bostwick Hoffman
- Born: March 3, 1899 Michigan, US
- Died: February 2, 1975 (aged 75) Ludington, Michigan, US
- Education: University of Michigan

Sport
- Sport: Track and field athletics
- Event: Javelin throw

Howard Bostwick Hoffman (March 3, 1899 – February 2, 1975) was an American track and field athlete. He specialized in the javelin throw and, as a member of the Michigan Wolverines men's track and field team, he won the 1922 NCAA Championship in the event. He was posthumously inducted into the University of Michigan Track and Field Hall of Fame in 2012.

== Early years ==
Hoffman was born in Michigan in 1899. His father, Harvey E. Hoffman, was a native of Michigan who was an osteopathic physician in Ludington, Michigan. His mother, Sadie Hoffman, was a native of New York.

== University of Michigan ==
Hoffman enrolled at the University of Michigan where he studied medicine. While attending Michigan, he was a member of the Michigan Wolverines men's track and field team from 1920 to 1922. He was the 1922 NCAA Champion in the javelin throw with a distance of 202 feet, 3 inches. He was the first University of Michigan track and field athlete to win an individual NCAA championship. He was also the Big Ten Conference champion in the event in both 1920 and 1921. He was also selected as an All-American in 1923. Hoffman set the Big Ten Conference record in the javelin and broke the Michigan javelin record seven times. Hoffman's seven record-breaking throws were as follows:

- June 4, 1920 – 170 feet, 9 inches
- June 5, 1920 – 172 feet, 10 inches
- May 7, 1921 – 173 feet, 0-3/8 inches
- May 21, 1921 – 182 feet, 1 inch
- June 6, 1922 – 182 feet, 8 inches
- June 13, 1922 – 200 feet
- June 17, 1922 – 202 feet, 3 inches

== Later years ==
After he graduated from Michigan, Hoffman joined his father's medical practice in Ludington, Michigan. During World War II, he served in the United States Army and attained the rank of lieutenant colonel. He died in Ludington in 1975 at age 75.

Hoffman was posthumously inducted into the University of Michigan Track and Field Hall of Fame in 2012.
