= Leonard Paulu =

American sprinter

- Born: November 23, 1896; Vining, Iowa, United States
- Died: May 29, 1988 (aged 91); Iowa
- Occupations: Sprinter, teacher, coach
- Known for: NCAA champion, 100-yard dash (1921–1922), 220 yard dash (1922)

Leonard Theodore Paulu (November 23, 1896 – May 29, 1988) was an American sprinter for Grinnell College in Grinnell, Iowa. Despite losing an eye and suffering serious injuries to his right leg and hip while serving in World War I, he won the 100-yard dash competition at the first two NCAA track and field championships in 1921 and 1922. He also won the 220 yard dash at the 1922 NCAA championships.

== Biography ==
=== Early years ===
Paulu was born in Vining, Iowa. He was the only son among the nine children of a Congregational preacher and Czech immigrant, Rev. Anton Paulu. He attended boarding school in Toledo, Iowa. Paulu later recalled that he worked for his room and board at the boarding school and lived in a room in the basement.

He enrolled at Grinnell College in 1915. He struggled academically while working to pay for the cost of his education and dropped out of school, before completing his freshman year to work full-time.

=== World War I ===
When the United States entered World War I, Paulu enlisted in the U.S. Army. In September 1918, he was wounded near Saint-Mihiel, France, when a German shell struck a nearby tree. Shrapnel from the shell "ripped into his body in four places," including his leg and eye. He later recalled that "one fragment entered just in front of the right ear and came out through the eye," and other fragments became lodged in his right leg and hip. As a result of the wounds, Paulu lost his right eye, and his right-leg stride was four inches shorter than that of his left leg. He was fitted with a glass eye which he occasionally lost and reportedly ran with his "head cocked to one side."

=== Track career and Grinnell College ===
As an injured veteran, Paulu was eligible for educational benefits and used the benefits to resume his education at Grinnell College in 1919. Grinnell's track coach, Charles B. Hoyt, saw Paulu compete in a sprint, and persuaded Paulu to join the school's track team. Paulu later described his discovery as follows: "Chuck Hoyt had returned to the school as the track coach and was teaching my physical education class that spring. One day, he had us run a sprint. I won."

Paulu won the 100-yard dash competition at the first two NCAA track and field championships in 1921 and 1922. He set the initial NCAA record at the event in 1921 (10.0 seconds) and then broke his own record at the 1922 meet with a time of 9.9 seconds. His best time in the 100-yard dash was 9.6 seconds at the Drake Relays. Paulu also won the NCAA championship in the 220 yard dash in 1922, breaking the NCAA record with a time of 21.8 seconds.

Paulu studied chemistry, physics and math at Grinnell and earned Phi Beta Kappa honors. After graduating from Grinnell in 1922, Paulu taught chemistry, physics and math in Oskaloosa, Iowa. In June 1923, he married Frances Hladky in Vining, Iowa.

In 1924, Paulu qualified for the U.S. Olympic team tryouts. The sprinting competition at the 1924 Summer Olympics in Paris was later depicted in the Academy Award-winning film Chariots of Fire. Paulu's times continued to improve in 1924, and he ran the 100-yard dash in 9.7 seconds. He withdrew from competition, because his wife was pregnant. Their first child, Irene Helen Paulu, was born on June 23, 1924.

=== Later years ===
In 1925, Paulu moved to Cedar Rapids, Iowa, and worked as a high school teacher and track and football coach for nearly 40 years until his retirement in 1963.

=== Honors and awards ===
In 1960, Paulu was honored by being named as the referee of the 50th anniversary Drake Relays. Paulu was inducted into the Iowa Association of Track Coaches Hall of Fame in 1975, the Iowa Sports Hall of Fame In 1978, and the Grinnell College Hall of Fame in 1995.

== See also ==
- 1921 NCAA Men's Track and Field Championships
- 1922 NCAA Men's Track and Field Championships
