= Notre Dame Fighting Irish track and field =

College track and field team

- University: University of Notre Dame
- Head coach: Matt Sparks
- Conference: ACC
- Location: Notre Dame, Indiana
- Outdoor track: Notre Dame Track and Field Stadium
- Nickname: Fighting Irish
- Colors: Blue and gold

The Notre Dame Fighting Irish track and field team is the track and field program that represents University of Notre Dame. The Fighting Irish compete in NCAA Division I as a member of the Atlantic Coast Conference. The team is based in Notre Dame, Indiana at the Notre Dame Track and Field Stadium.

The program is coached by Matt Sparks. The track and field program officially encompasses four teams because the NCAA considers men's and women's indoor track and field and outdoor track and field as separate sports.

Olympic bronze medallist Molly Seidel has the most individual NCAA titles of any Notre Dame athlete, with three over the 3000 m, 5000 m, and 10,000 m from 2015 to 2016.

== Postseason ==
As of 2024, a total of 95 men and 31 women have achieved individual first-team All-American status at the Division I men's outdoor, women's outdoor, men's indoor, or women's indoor national championships.

First team All-Americans
Team	Championships	Name	Event	Place	Ref.
Men's	1921 Outdoor	Gus Desch	220 yards hurdles	1st	
Men's	1921 Outdoor	Chet Wynne	220 yards hurdles	5th	
Men's	1921 Outdoor	Bill Hayes	200 meters	4th	
Men's	1921 Outdoor	John Murphy	High jump	1st	
Men's	1921 Outdoor	Edward J. Hogan	Pole vault	5th	
Men's	1921 Outdoor	Lawrence Shaw	Shot put	5th	
Men's	1921 Outdoor	Eugene Oberst	Javelin throw	5th	
Men's	1922 Outdoor	Gus Desch	220 yards hurdles	2nd	
Men's	1922 Outdoor	Bill Hayes	100 meters	2nd	
Men's	1922 Outdoor	Gus Desch	100 meters	6th	
Men's	1922 Outdoor	Bill Hayes	200 meters	4th	
Men's	1922 Outdoor	John Murphy	High jump	1st	
Men's	1922 Outdoor	William Hogan	Pole vault	3rd	
Men's	1922 Outdoor	Tom Lieb	Discus throw	1st	
Men's	1923 Outdoor	David Weekes	High jump	2nd	
Men's	1923 Outdoor	Tom Lieb	Discus throw	1st	
Men's	1926 Outdoor	Charles Judge	Mile run	1st	
Men's	1926 Outdoor	Robert Carey	High jump	6th	
Men's	1926 Outdoor	Paul Harrington	Pole vault	1st	
Men's	1926 Outdoor	Joe Boland	Shot put	6th	
Men's	1927 Outdoor	Joe della Maria	200 meters	3rd	
Men's	1928 Outdoor	Jack Elder	100 meters	>6th	
Men's	1929 Outdoor	Jack Elder	100 meters	5th	
Men's	1930 Outdoor	Alex Wilson	400 meters	4th	
Men's	1930 Outdoor	Brant Little	800 meters	3rd	
Men's	1930 Outdoor	Ralph Johnson	Pole vault	6th	
Men's	1931 Outdoor	Bill McCormick	100 meters	>6th	
Men's	1931 Outdoor	Alex Wilson	800 meters	2nd	
Men's	1931 Outdoor	Ralph Johnson	Pole vault	4th	
Men's	1932 Outdoor	Alex Wilson	400 meters	1st	
Men's	1932 Outdoor	Robert Darling	High jump	6th	
Men's	1933 Outdoor	Vincent Murphy	High jump	1st	
Men's	1934 Outdoor	Vincent Murphy	High jump	4th	
Men's	1934 Outdoor	George Meagher	Long jump	5th	
Men's	1934 Outdoor	Don Elser	Shot put	7th	
Men's	1935 Outdoor	Vincent Murphy	High jump	2nd	
Men's	1935 Outdoor	George Meagher	Long jump	7th	
Men's	1935 Outdoor	Don Elser	Shot put	2nd	
Men's	1936 Outdoor	Don Elser	220 yards hurdles	2nd	
Men's	1936 Outdoor	Joe McGrath	800 meters	4th	
Men's	1936 Outdoor	Don Elser	Shot put	5th	
Men's	1937 Outdoor	Greg Rice	Mile run	4th	
Men's	1937 Outdoor	Greg Rice	3000 meters	1st	
Men's	1937 Outdoor	Bill Faymonville	Discus throw	6th	
Men's	1938 Outdoor	Bill Clifford	100 meters	5th	
Men's	1938 Outdoor	John Francis	800 meters	2nd	
Men's	1938 Outdoor	Greg Rice	3000 meters	2nd	
Men's	1938 Outdoor	Bill Faymonville	Discus throw	3rd	
Men's	1939 Outdoor	Greg Rice	3000 meters	1st	
Men's	1939 Outdoor	Bill Faymonville	Discus throw	5th	
Men's	1941 Outdoor	Keith O'Rourke	High jump	3rd	
Men's	1941 Outdoor	James Delaney	Shot put	4th	
Men's	1942 Outdoor	Frank Conforti	Mile run	4th	
Men's	1942 Outdoor	Ollie Hunter	3000 meters	2nd	
Men's	1942 Outdoor	James Delaney	Shot put	3rd	
Men's	1943 Outdoor	James Delaney	Shot put	3rd	
Men's	1943 Outdoor	James Delaney	Discus throw	3rd	
Men's	1944 Outdoor	Jack Burke	100 meters	4th	
Men's	1944 Outdoor	Frank Martin	Mile run	3rd	
Men's	1944 Outdoor	Frank Martin	3000 meters	1st	
Men's	1944 Outdoor	Mike Kelly	3000 meters	6th	
Men's	1944 Outdoor	Phil Anderson	Pole vault	1st	
Men's	1944 Outdoor	Edward Sullivan	Shot put	3rd	
Men's	1944 Outdoor	Joseph Kelley	Shot put	6th	
Men's	1944 Outdoor	Joseph Kelley	Discus throw	2nd	
Men's	1945 Outdoor	Bill O'Neill	110 meters hurdles	6th	
Men's	1945 Outdoor	Dave Murphy	200 meters	3rd	
Men's	1945 Outdoor	Bill Tully	Mile run	6th	
Men's	1945 Outdoor	Ray Struble	Pole vault	4th	
Men's	1945 Outdoor	Joseph Kelley	Shot put	3rd	
Men's	1945 Outdoor	Joseph Kelley	Discus throw	2nd	
Men's	1946 Outdoor	Madill Gartiser	220 yards hurdles	4th	
Men's	1948 Outdoor	Bob Smith	200 meters	6th	
Men's	1948 Outdoor	Bill Leonard	1500 meters	5th	
Men's	1948 Outdoor	James Kittel	3000 meters steeplechase	3rd	
Men's	1949 Outdoor	Bill Fleming	220 yards hurdles	7th	
Men's	1949 Outdoor	John Helwig	Shot put	8th	
Men's	1950 Outdoor	Bill Fleming	220 yards hurdles	3rd	
Men's	1950 Outdoor	Bill Fleming	110 meters hurdles	2nd	
Men's	1952 Outdoor	Harvey Newquist II	110 meters hurdles	8th	
Men's	1953 Outdoor	Joe Springer	Pole vault	3rd	
Men's	1954 Outdoor	Jim Harrington	Pole vault	5th	
Men's	1955 Outdoor	Bernie Allard	High jump	2nd	
Men's	1956 Outdoor	Aubrey Lewis	400 meters hurdles	1st	
Men's	1956 Outdoor	Bernie Allard	High jump	4th	
Men's	1957 Outdoor	Aubrey Lewis	220 yards hurdles	3rd	
Men's	1958 Outdoor	Mike Morando	Javelin throw	7th	
Men's	1964 Outdoor	Pete Whitehouse	110 meters hurdles	2nd	
Men's	1964 Outdoor	Bill Boyle	400 meters	5th	
Men's	1965 Indoor	Ed Dean	Mile run	4th	
Men's	1965 Indoor	Bill Clark	3000 meters	2nd	
Men's	1965 Outdoor	Bill Boyle	400 meters	7th	
Men's	1965 Outdoor	Ed Dean	Mile run	4th	
Men's	1965 Outdoor	Bill Clark	5000 meters	7th	
Men's	1966 Indoor	Pete Farrell	1000 meters	4th	
Men's	1966 Indoor	Ed Dean	Mile run	3rd	
Men's	1966 Outdoor	Pete Farrell	800 meters	6th	
Men's	1966 Outdoor	Ed Dean	Mile run	7th	
Men's	1967 Outdoor	Pete Farrell	800 meters	7th	
Men's	1968 Indoor	Edwin Broderick	High jump	5th	
Men's	1968 Outdoor	Bill Hurd	100 meters	4th	
Men's	1968 Outdoor	Bill Hurd	200 meters	3rd	
Men's	1969 Indoor	Mike McCann	4 × 800 meters relay	2nd	
Men's	1969 Indoor	Joe Brady	4 × 800 meters relay	2nd	
Men's	1969 Indoor	Joe Quigley	4 × 800 meters relay	2nd	
Men's	1969 Indoor	Rick Wohlhuter	4 × 800 meters relay	2nd	
Men's	1969 Outdoor	Bill Hurd	100 meters	5th	
Men's	1969 Outdoor	Bill Hurd	200 meters	3rd	
Men's	1970 Indoor	Rich Wolhuter	600 yards	1st	
Men's	1970 Outdoor	Paul Gill	Discus throw	7th	
Men's	1971 Outdoor	Tom McMannon	110 meters hurdles	8th	
Men's	1972 Indoor	Tom McMannon	55 meters hurdles	1st	
Men's	1981 Outdoor	Chuck Aragon	1500 meters	5th	
Men's	1983 Indoor	Steve Dziabis	600 yards	6th	
Men's	1986 Indoor	John McNelis	4 × 800 meters relay	3rd	
Men's	1986 Indoor	Robert Nobles	4 × 800 meters relay	3rd	
Men's	1986 Indoor	Jeff Van Wie	4 × 800 meters relay	3rd	
Men's	1986 Indoor	James Tyler	4 × 800 meters relay	3rd	
Men's	1986 Outdoor	James Tyler	1500 meters	8th	
Men's	1990 Indoor	Mike O'Connor	5000 meters	5th	
Men's	1991 Indoor	Raghib Ismail	55 meters	2nd	
Women's	1994 Outdoor	Erica Peterson	400 meters hurdles	7th	
Men's	1995 Indoor	Allen Rossum	55 meters	7th	
Men's	1997 Indoor	Allen Rossum	55 meters	7th	
Men's	1997 Indoor	Jeff Hojnacki	Distance medley relay	8th	
Men's	1997 Indoor	Danny Payton	Distance medley relay	8th	
Men's	1997 Indoor	Jason Rexing	Distance medley relay	8th	
Men's	1997 Indoor	Derek Seiling	Distance medley relay	8th	
Women's	1997 Outdoor	Dominique Calloway	100 meters hurdles	8th	
Men's	1998 Indoor	Errol Williams	55 meters hurdles	8th	
Men's	1998 Outdoor	Errol Williams	110 meters hurdles	3rd	
Women's	1998 Outdoor	Allison Klemmer	10,000 meters	8th	
Men's	1999 Indoor	Mike Brown	Pole vault	6th	
Men's	1999 Indoor	Marshaun West	Long jump	6th	
Women's	1999 Indoor	Joanna Deeter	5000 meters	6th	
Men's	1999 Outdoor	Ryan Shay	10,000 meters	7th	
Women's	1999 Outdoor	JoAnna Deeter	5000 meters	4th	
Women's	1999 Outdoor	JoAnna Deeter	10,000 meters	3rd	
Women's	1999 Outdoor	Allison Klemmer	10,000 meters	7th	
Men's	2000 Indoor	Phil Mishka	Distance medley relay	6th	
Men's	2000 Indoor	Chris Cochran	Distance medley relay	6th	
Men's	2000 Indoor	Tim Kober	Distance medley relay	6th	
Men's	2000 Indoor	Luke Watson	Distance medley relay	6th	
Men's	2000 Outdoor	Ryan Shay	10,000 meters	7th	
Men's	2000 Outdoor	Marshaun West	Long jump	7th	
Women's	2000 Outdoor	Jennifer Englehardt	High jump	7th	
Women's	2001 Indoor	Liz Grow	400 meters	8th	
Men's	2001 Outdoor	Ryan Shay	5000 meters	6th	
Men's	2001 Outdoor	Ryan Shay	10,000 meters	1st	
Men's	2002 Indoor	Luke Watson	3000 meters	3rd	
Men's	2002 Indoor	Ryan Shay	5000 meters	6th	
Women's	2002 Indoor	Liz Grow	400 meters	4th	
Men's	2002 Outdoor	Luke Watson	3000 meters steeplechase	7th	
Men's	2002 Outdoor	Ryan Shay	10,000 meters	2nd	
Women's	2002 Outdoor	Lauren King	1500 meters	6th	
Women's	2002 Outdoor	Liz Grow	4 × 400 meters relay	5th	
Women's	2002 Outdoor	Kristen Dodd	4 × 400 meters relay	5th	
Women's	2002 Outdoor	Alesha Boyd	4 × 400 meters relay	5th	
Women's	2002 Outdoor	Kymia Love	4 × 400 meters relay	5th	
Women's	2002 Outdoor	Tameisha King	Long jump	7th	
Men's	2003 Indoor	Luke Watson	Mile run	3rd	
Women's	2003 Indoor	Lauren King	Mile run	7th	
Women's	2003 Indoor	Tameisha King	Long jump	6th	
Women's	2003 Outdoor	Molly Huddle	5000 meters	4th	
Women's	2003 Outdoor	Tameisha King	Long jump	3rd	
Women's	2004 Indoor	Kerry Meagher	Mile run	7th	
Women's	2004 Indoor	Molly Huddle	3000 meters	7th	
Women's	2004 Indoor	Molly Huddle	5000 meters	3rd	
Women's	2004 Outdoor	Molly Huddle	5000 meters	3rd	
Men's	2005 Indoor	Selim Nurudeen	60 meters hurdles	6th	
Men's	2005 Indoor	Kurt Benninger	Mile run	4th	
Men's	2005 Indoor	Eric Morrison	Distance medley relay	6th	
Men's	2005 Indoor	Trevor McClain-Duer	Distance medley relay	6th	
Men's	2005 Indoor	Adam Currie	Distance medley relay	6th	
Men's	2005 Indoor	Kurt Benninger	Distance medley relay	6th	
Men's	2005 Outdoor	Selim Nurudeen	110 meters hurdles	7th	
Women's	2005 Outdoor	Stephanie Madia	5000 meters	5th	
Men's	2006 Indoor	Thomas Chamney	800 meters	6th	
Men's	2006 Indoor	Adam Currie	Distance medley relay	6th	
Men's	2006 Indoor	Ryan Postel	Distance medley relay	6th	
Men's	2006 Indoor	John Cavanaugh	Distance medley relay	6th	
Men's	2006 Indoor	Kurt Benniger	Distance medley relay	6th	
Women's	2006 Indoor	Stephanie Madia	5000 meters	4th	
Men's	2006 Outdoor	Thomas Chamney	800 meters	6th	
Women's	2006 Outdoor	Molly Huddle	5000 meters	2nd	
Women's	2006 Outdoor	Emily Loomis	High jump	8th	
Men's	2007 Indoor	Thomas Chamney	800 meters	8th	
Men's	2007 Outdoor	Kurt Benninger	1500 meters	5th	
Women's	2007 Outdoor	Molly Huddle	5000 meters	3rd	
Men's	2008 Indoor	Jake Watson	Mile run	6th	
Men's	2008 Indoor	Kurt Benninger	3000 meters	5th	
Men's	2008 Outdoor	Patrick Smyth	5000 meters	8th	
Men's	2009 Indoor	Patrick Smyth	3000 meters	8th	
Women's	2009 Indoor	Joanna Schultz	400 meters	8th	
Men's	2009 Outdoor	Patrick Smyth	10,000 meters	4th	
Women's	2009 Outdoor	Mary Saxer	Pole vault	3rd	
Women's	2009 Outdoor	Jaclyn Espinoza	Discus throw	3rd	
Men's	2010 Indoor	Jack Howard	800 meters	7th	
Men's	2010 Outdoor	Kevin Schipper	Pole vault	8th	
Men's	2011 Indoor	Johnathan Shawel	Distance medley relay	4th	
Men's	2011 Indoor	Patrick Feeney	Distance medley relay	4th	
Men's	2011 Indoor	Jack Howard	Distance medley relay	4th	
Men's	2011 Indoor	Jeremy Rae	Distance medley relay	4th	
Men's	2012 Indoor	Johnathan Shawel	Distance medley relay	1st	
Men's	2012 Indoor	Christopher Giesting	Distance medley relay	1st	
Men's	2012 Indoor	Randall Babb	Distance medley relay	1st	
Men's	2012 Indoor	Jeremy Rae	Distance medley relay	1st	
Men's	2012 Indoor	Kevin Schipper	Pole vault	4th	
Women's	2012 Indoor	Maddie Buttinger	Pentathlon	3rd	
Men's	2013 Indoor	Patrick Feeney	400 meters	4th	
Men's	2013 Indoor	Chris Giesting	400 meters	8th	
Women's	2013 Indoor	Jade Barber	60 meters hurdles	7th	
Women's	2013 Indoor	Rebecca Tracy	Mile run	8th	
Women's	2013 Indoor	Kelly Curran	Distance medley relay	7th	
Women's	2013 Indoor	Michelle Brown	Distance medley relay	7th	
Women's	2013 Indoor	Danielle Aragon	Distance medley relay	7th	
Women's	2013 Indoor	Alexa Aragon	Distance medley relay	7th	
Men's	2013 Outdoor	Jeremy Rae	1500 meters	5th	
Women's	2013 Outdoor	Rebecca Tracy	1500 meters	4th	
Women's	2013 Outdoor	Alexa Aragon	3000 meters steeplechase	8th	
Men's	2014 Indoor	Chris Giesting	400 meters	5th	
Men's	2014 Indoor	Patrick Feeney	400 meters	7th	
Men's	2014 Indoor	Christopher Giesting	4 × 400 meters relay	8th	
Men's	2014 Indoor	Jarrod Buchanon	4 × 400 meters relay	8th	
Men's	2014 Indoor	Harvey Smith	4 × 400 meters relay	8th	
Men's	2014 Indoor	Patrick Feeney	4 × 400 meters relay	8th	
Men's	2014 Indoor	Patrick Feeney	Distance medley relay	4th	
Men's	2014 Indoor	Jacob Dumford	Distance medley relay	4th	
Men's	2014 Indoor	Nick Happe	Distance medley relay	4th	
Men's	2014 Indoor	Jeremy Rae	Distance medley relay	4th	
Women's	2014 Indoor	Jade Barber	60 meters hurdles	7th	
Women's	2014 Indoor	Alexa Aragon	Distance medley relay	3rd	
Women's	2014 Indoor	Michelle Brown	Distance medley relay	3rd	
Women's	2014 Indoor	Danielle Aragon	Distance medley relay	3rd	
Women's	2014 Indoor	Kelly Curran	Distance medley relay	3rd	
Men's	2014 Outdoor	Chris Giesting	400 meters	7th	
Women's	2014 Outdoor	Michelle Brown	400 meters	5th	
Women's	2014 Outdoor	Margaret Bamgbose	400 meters	6th	
Women's	2014 Outdoor	Alexa Aragon	3000 meters steeplechase	8th	
Women's	2015 Indoor	Margaret Bamgbose	400 meters	6th	
Women's	2015 Indoor	Molly Seidel	5000 meters	6th	
Women's	2015 Indoor	Jessica Harris	Distance medley relay	8th	
Women's	2015 Indoor	Margaret Bamgbose	Distance medley relay	8th	
Women's	2015 Indoor	Samantha Murray	Distance medley relay	8th	
Women's	2015 Indoor	Danielle Aragon	Distance medley relay	8th	
Women's	2015 Outdoor	Jade Barber	100 meters hurdles	4th	
Women's	2015 Outdoor	Margaret Bamgbose	400 meters	6th	
Women's	2015 Outdoor	Molly Seidel	10,000 meters	1st	
Men's	2016 Indoor	Nate Richartz	Pole vault	8th	
Women's	2016 Indoor	Kaila Barber	60 meters hurdles	6th	
Women's	2016 Indoor	Margaret Bamgbose	400 meters	5th	
Women's	2016 Indoor	Molly Seidel	3000 meters	1st	
Women's	2016 Indoor	Molly Seidel	5000 meters	1st	
Women's	2016 Indoor	Anna Rohrer	5000 meters	4th	
Women's	2016 Indoor	Jessica Harris	Distance medley relay	6th	
Women's	2016 Indoor	Parker English	Distance medley relay	6th	
Women's	2016 Indoor	Jamie Marvil	Distance medley relay	6th	
Women's	2016 Indoor	Danielle Aragon	Distance medley relay	6th	
Women's	2016 Outdoor	Margaret Bamgbose	400 meters	4th	
Women's	2016 Outdoor	Kaila Barber	400 meters hurdles	8th	
Women's	2016 Outdoor	Parker English	4 × 400 meters relay	6th	
Women's	2016 Outdoor	Payton Miller	4 × 400 meters relay	6th	
Women's	2016 Outdoor	Jordan Shead	4 × 400 meters relay	6th	
Women's	2016 Outdoor	Margaret Bamgbose	4 × 400 meters relay	6th	
Men's	2017 Indoor	Nate Richartz	Pole vault	6th	
Women's	2017 Indoor	Anna Rohrer	5000 meters	3rd	
Women's	2017 Indoor	Kelly Hart	Distance medley relay	8th	
Women's	2017 Indoor	Payton Miller	Distance medley relay	8th	
Women's	2017 Indoor	Jamie Marvil	Distance medley relay	8th	
Women's	2017 Indoor	Jessica Harris	Distance medley relay	8th	
Men's	2018 Indoor	Jacob Dumford	Distance medley relay	2nd	
Men's	2018 Indoor	Edward Cheatham	Distance medley relay	2nd	
Men's	2018 Indoor	Elijah Silva	Distance medley relay	2nd	
Men's	2018 Indoor	Yared Nuguse	Distance medley relay	2nd	
Women's	2018 Indoor	Jessica Harris	Mile run	8th	
Women's	2018 Outdoor	Anna Rohrer	10,000 meters	6th	
Men's	2019 Indoor	Dylan Jacobs	Distance medley relay	1st	
Men's	2019 Indoor	Edward Cheatham	Distance medley relay	1st	
Men's	2019 Indoor	Samuel Voelz	Distance medley relay	1st	
Men's	2019 Indoor	Yared Nuguse	Distance medley relay	1st	
Men's	2019 Outdoor	Yared Nuguse	1500 meters	1st	
Women's	2019 Outdoor	Jessica Harris	1500 meters	3rd	
Women's	2019 Outdoor	Anna Rohrer	10,000 meters	6th	
Men's	2021 Indoor	Samuel Voelz	800 meters	4th	
Women's	2021 Indoor	Rachel Tanczos	Weight throw	2nd	
Women's	2021 Indoor	Jadin O'Brien	Pentathlon	4th	
Men's	2021 Outdoor	Yared Nuguse	1500 meters	2nd	
Women's	2021 Outdoor	Katie Wasserman	5000 meters	2nd	
Men's	2022 Indoor	Samuel Voelz	Distance medley relay	2nd	
Men's	2022 Indoor	Max Frye	Distance medley relay	2nd	
Men's	2022 Indoor	Tim Zepf	Distance medley relay	2nd	
Men's	2022 Indoor	Yared Nuguse	Distance medley relay	2nd	
Women's	2022 Indoor	Erin Sullivan	Distance medley relay	8th	
Women's	2022 Indoor	Jadin O'Brien	Distance medley relay	8th	
Women's	2022 Indoor	Kaitlin Ryan	Distance medley relay	8th	
Women's	2022 Indoor	Olivia Markezich	Distance medley relay	8th	
Women's	2022 Indoor	Rachel Tanczos	Weight throw	4th	
Women's	2022 Indoor	Jadin O'Brien	Pentathlon	4th	
Men's	2022 Outdoor	Dylan Jacobs	10,000 meters	1st	
Women's	2023 Indoor	Olivia Markezich	3000 meters	2nd	
Women's	2023 Indoor	Katie Thronson	Distance medley relay	3rd	
Women's	2023 Indoor	Eve Balseiro	Distance medley relay	3rd	
Women's	2023 Indoor	Kaitlin Ryan	Distance medley relay	3rd	
Women's	2023 Indoor	Olivia Markezich	Distance medley relay	3rd	
Women's	2023 Indoor	Jadin O'Brien	Pentathlon	1st	
Men's	2023 Outdoor	Carter Solomon	5000 meters	7th	
Men's	2023 Outdoor	John Keenan	Javelin throw	7th	
Women's	2023 Outdoor	Olivia Markezich	3000 meters steeplechase	1st	
Women's	2023 Outdoor	Jadin O'Brien	Heptathlon	th	
Women's	2023 Outdoor	Alaina Brady	Heptathlon	th	
Women's	2023 Outdoor	Jadin O'Brien	Heptathlon	7th	
Men's	2024 Indoor	Michael Shoaf	Shot put	6th	
Women's	2024 Indoor	Olivia Markezich	3000 meters	2nd	
Women's	2024 Indoor	Sophie Novak	Distance medley relay	2nd	
Women's	2024 Indoor	Jordyn Borsch	Distance medley relay	2nd	
Women's	2024 Indoor	Gretchen Farley	Distance medley relay	2nd	
Women's	2024 Indoor	Olivia Markezich	Distance medley relay	2nd	
Women's	2024 Indoor	Jadin O'Brien	Pentathlon	1st	
Men's	2024 Outdoor	CJ Singleton	3000 meters steeplechase	5th	
Women's	2024 Outdoor	Olivia Markezich	3000 meters steeplechase	2nd	
Women's	2024 Outdoor	Sophie Novak	3000 meters steeplechase	7th	
Women's	2024 Outdoor	Jadin O'Brien	Heptathlon	2nd	

== See also ==
- Category:Notre Dame Fighting Irish men's track and field athletes (56)
- Category:Notre Dame Fighting Irish women's track and field athletes (8)
