= Michigan State Spartans track and field =

College track and field team

- University: Michigan State University
- Head coach: Lisa Breznau
- Conference: Big Ten
- Location: East Lansing, Michigan
- Outdoor track: Ralph Young Field
- Nickname: Spartans
- Colors: Green and white

The Michigan State Spartans track and field team is the track and field program that represents Michigan State University. The Spartans compete in NCAA Division I as a member of the Big Ten Conference. The team is based in East Lansing, Michigan at the Ralph Young Field.

The program is coached by Lisa Breznau. The track and field program officially encompasses four teams because the NCAA considers men's and women's indoor track and field and outdoor track and field as separate sports.

Sevatheda Fynes has won the most NCAA titles of any Spartan athlete, with three over the sprints in 1997.

== Postseason ==
=== AIAW ===
The Spartans have had 9 individual AIAW All-Americans finishing in the top six at the AIAW indoor or outdoor championships.

AIAW All-Americans
Championships	Name	Event	Place
1974 Outdoor	Marjorie Grimmett	220 yards	4th
1974 Outdoor	Laurel Vietzke	Long jump	6th
1975 Outdoor	Karyn Dennis	220 yards	1st
1975 Outdoor	Marjorie Grimmett	220 yards	5th
1975 Outdoor	Sue Latter	440 yards	6th
1975 Outdoor	Marjorie Grimmett	4 × 100 meters relay	2nd
1975 Outdoor	Laurel Vietzke	4 × 100 meters relay	2nd
1975 Outdoor	Sue Latter	4 × 100 meters relay	2nd
1975 Outdoor	Karyn Dennis	4 × 100 meters relay	2nd
1975 Outdoor	Laurel Vietzke	Long jump	3rd
1976 Outdoor	Barb Bronson	4 × 880 yards relay	6th
1976 Outdoor	Diane Culp	4 × 880 yards relay	6th
1976 Outdoor	Kay Richards	4 × 880 yards relay	6th
1976 Outdoor	Lil Warnes	4 × 880 yards relay	6th
1977 Outdoor	Sue Latter	800 meters	3rd
1977 Outdoor	Sue Sebastien	4 × 440 yards relay	5th
1977 Outdoor	Elaine Carr	4 × 440 yards relay	5th
1977 Outdoor	Johanna Matthyssen	4 × 440 yards relay	5th
1977 Outdoor	Sue Latter	4 × 440 yards relay	5th
1977 Outdoor	Anita Lee	Long jump	6th
1979 Outdoor	Cheryl Gilliam	100 meters	5th
1979 Outdoor	Kelly Spatz	3000 meters	6th
1979 Outdoor	Mollie Brennan	4 × 440 yards relay	5th
1979 Outdoor	Kathy Miller	4 × 440 yards relay	5th
1979 Outdoor	Pam Swanigan	4 × 440 yards relay	5th
1979 Outdoor	Pam Sedwick	4 × 440 yards relay	5th
1979 Outdoor	Mollie Brennan	Sprint medley relay	6th
1979 Outdoor	Kathy Miller	Sprint medley relay	6th
1979 Outdoor	Cheryl Gilliam	Sprint medley relay	6th
1979 Outdoor	Pam Sedwick	Sprint medley relay	6th
1980 Outdoor	Diane Williams	100 meters	4th
1980 Outdoor	Cheryl Gilliam	200 meters	5th
1981 Indoor	Cheryl Gilliam	60 meters	6th
1981 Indoor	Pam Sedwick	600 meters	2nd
1981 Indoor	Kelly Spatz	3000 meters	2nd
1981 Indoor	Pam Sedwick	Distance medley relay	3rd
1981 Indoor	Judi Brown	Distance medley relay	3rd
1981 Indoor	Ann Pewe	Distance medley relay	3rd
1981 Indoor	Kelly Spatz	Distance medley relay	3rd

=== NCAA ===
As of 2024, a total of 95 men and 27 women have achieved individual first-team All-American status at the Division I men's outdoor, women's outdoor, men's indoor, or women's indoor national championships (using the modern criteria of top-8 placing regardless of athlete nationality).

First team NCAA All-Americans
Team	Championships	Name	Event	Place	Ref.
Men's	1925 Outdoor	Fred Alderman	200 meters	3rd	
Men's	1926 Outdoor	Fred Alderman	100 meters	4th	
Men's	1926 Outdoor	Fred Alderman	200 meters	3rd	
Men's	1927 Outdoor	Bohn Grim	100 meters	>6th	
Men's	1927 Outdoor	Fred Alderman	100 meters	1st	
Men's	1927 Outdoor	Fred Alderman	200 meters	1st	
Men's	1928 Outdoor	Henry Henson	200 meters	3rd	
Men's	1928 Outdoor	Harold McAtee	Pole vault	4th	
Men's	1929 Outdoor	Harold McAtee	Pole vault	5th	
Men's	1931 Outdoor	Ken Yarger	110 meters hurdles	4th	
Men's	1931 Outdoor	Clark Chamberlain	3000 meters	1st	
Men's	1932 Outdoor	Roger Keast	400 meters	5th	
Men's	1933 Outdoor	Monte Holcomb	Pole vault	5th	
Men's	1934 Outdoor	Otto Pongrace	Mile run	5th	
Men's	1935 Outdoor	James Wright	800 meters	6th	
Men's	1935 Outdoor	Tom Ottey	3000 meters	2nd	
Men's	1936 Outdoor	Ken Waite	5000 meters	3rd	
Men's	1936 Outdoor	Fran Dittrich	Long jump	7th	
Men's	1936 Outdoor	Fran Dittrich	Triple jump	5th	
Men's	1937 Outdoor	Carl Mueller	200 meters	6th	
Men's	1937 Outdoor	Richard Frey	3000 meters	3rd	
Men's	1938 Outdoor	Harvey Woodstra	220 yards hurdles	3rd	
Men's	1938 Outdoor	Wilbur Greer	100 meters	4th	
Men's	1938 Outdoor	Richard Frey	3000 meters	3rd	
Men's	1939 Outdoor	Wilbur Greer	100 meters	8th	
Men's	1939 Outdoor	Walter Arrington	High jump	4th	
Men's	1940 Outdoor	Roy Fehr	3000 meters	1st	
Men's	1940 Outdoor	Walter Arrington	Long jump	6th	
Men's	1941 Outdoor	Walter Arrington	High jump	6th	
Men's	1942 Outdoor	James Milne	High jump	2nd	
Men's	1943 Outdoor	William Scott	Mile run	4th	
Men's	1943 Outdoor	Jerry Page	3000 meters	2nd	
Men's	1943 Outdoor	James Milne	High jump	5th	
Men's	1944 Outdoor	Robert Price	3000 meters	4th	
Men's	1945 Outdoor	Bill Maskill	800 meters	6th	
Men's	1946 Outdoor	Jim Fraser	400 meters	6th	
Men's	1946 Outdoor	Leonard Naab	Javelin throw	4th	
Men's	1947 Outdoor	Fred Johnson	220 yards hurdles	5th	
Men's	1947 Outdoor	Bob Schepers	200 meters	3rd	
Men's	1947 Outdoor	Jack Dianetti	800 meters	2nd	
Men's	1947 Outdoor	Fred Johnson	Long jump	6th	
Men's	1948 Outdoor	Jack Dianetti	800 meters	2nd	
Men's	1948 Outdoor	Fred Johnson	Long jump	7th	
Men's	1949 Outdoor	Horace Smith	220 yards hurdles	4th	
Men's	1949 Outdoor	Paige Christiansen	110 meters hurdles	4th	
Men's	1949 Outdoor	Warren Dretzler	3000 meters	2nd	
Men's	1949 Outdoor	Fred Johnson	Long jump	1st	
Men's	1950 Outdoor	Horace Smith	110 meters hurdles	5th	
Men's	1950 Outdoor	Bill Mack	Mile run	3rd	
Men's	1950 Outdoor	Warren Druetzler	3000 meters	4th	
Men's	1950 Outdoor	Bob Carey	Shot put	6th	
Men's	1950 Outdoor	Jesse Thomas	Javelin throw	8th	
Men's	1951 Outdoor	Jesse Thomas	220 yards hurdles	4th	
Men's	1951 Outdoor	Jesse Thomas	110 meters hurdles	5th	
Men's	1951 Outdoor	Warren Druetzler	Mile run	1st	
Men's	1951 Outdoor	Jim Kepford	3000 meters	6th	
Men's	1951 Outdoor	Bob Carey	Shot put	3rd	
Men's	1952 Outdoor	Bob Carey	Shot put	6th	
Men's	1954 Outdoor	John Corbelli	220 yards hurdles	5th	
Men's	1954 Outdoor	Edgar Brabham	100 meters	8th	
Men's	1954 Outdoor	Edgar Brabham	200 meters	4th	
Men's	1954 Outdoor	Kevan Gosper	400 meters	8th	
Men's	1955 Outdoor	Kevan Gosper	400 meters	4th	
Men's	1955 Outdoor	Charles Coykendall	Pole vault	8th	
Men's	1956 Outdoor	Edgar Brabham	200 meters	5th	
Men's	1956 Outdoor	Dave Lean	400 meters hurdles	6th	
Men's	1956 Outdoor	Henry Kennedy	3000 meters steeplechase	1st	
Men's	1956 Outdoor	Selwyn Jones	5000 meters	3rd	
Men's	1956 Outdoor	Selwyn Jones	10,000 meters	1st	
Men's	1957 Outdoor	Selwyn Jones	3000 meters	7th	
Men's	1958 Outdoor	Dave Lean	800 meters	4th	
Men's	1958 Outdoor	Forddy Kennedy	3000 meters	6th	
Men's	1959 Outdoor	Ted Nelson	3000 meters steeplechase	8th	
Men's	1960 Outdoor	Sol Akpata	Triple jump	6th	
Men's	1961 Outdoor	Gerry Young	5000 meters	7th	
Men's	1961 Outdoor	Sol Akpata	Long jump	5th	
Men's	1965 Indoor	Gene Washington	55 meters hurdles	1st	
Men's	1965 Indoor	Daswell Campbell	400 meters	5th	
Men's	1965 Indoor	Jim Garrett	Long jump	2nd	
Men's	1965 Outdoor	Gene Washington	110 meters hurdles	6th	
Men's	1965 Outdoor	Das Campbell	200 meters	7th	
Men's	1965 Outdoor	Clint Jones	4 × 100 meters relay	3rd	
Men's	1965 Outdoor	James Summers	4 × 100 meters relay	3rd	
Men's	1965 Outdoor	Gene Washington	4 × 100 meters relay	3rd	
Men's	1965 Outdoor	Das Campbell	4 × 100 meters relay	3rd	
Men's	1965 Outdoor	Mike Bowers	High jump	4th	
Men's	1966 Indoor	Gene Washington	55 meters hurdles	4th	
Men's	1966 Indoor	Jim Garrett	Long jump	5th	
Men's	1966 Outdoor	Gene Washington	110 meters hurdles	5th	
Men's	1966 Outdoor	Bob Steele	400 meters hurdles	1st	
Men's	1966 Outdoor	John Spain	800 meters	7th	
Men's	1966 Outdoor	Dick Sharkey	5000 meters	7th	
Men's	1966 Outdoor	Dick Sharkey	10,000 meters	6th	
Men's	1967 Indoor	Gene Washington	55 meters hurdles	5th	
Men's	1967 Indoor	Don Crawford	400 meters	4th	
Men's	1967 Indoor	Pat Wilson	600 yards	5th	
Men's	1967 Outdoor	Bob Steele	400 meters hurdles	1st	
Men's	1967 Outdoor	Dick Sharkey	5000 meters	7th	
Men's	1967 Outdoor	Dick Sharkey	10,000 meters	5th	
Men's	1968 Indoor	Charles Pollard	55 meters hurdles	4th	
Men's	1968 Indoor	Don Crawford	4 × 400 meters relay	3rd	
Men's	1968 Indoor	Rich Stevens	4 × 400 meters relay	3rd	
Men's	1968 Indoor	Pat Wilson	4 × 400 meters relay	3rd	
Men's	1968 Indoor	Bill Wehrwin	4 × 400 meters relay	3rd	
Men's	1968 Indoor	Roland Carter	Pole vault	3rd	
Men's	1968 Outdoor	Don Crawford	400 meters	8th	
Men's	1968 Outdoor	Rich Dunn	4 × 400 meters relay	5th	
Men's	1968 Outdoor	Pat Wilson	4 × 400 meters relay	5th	
Men's	1968 Outdoor	Bill Wehrwein	4 × 400 meters relay	5th	
Men's	1968 Outdoor	Don Crawford	4 × 400 meters relay	5th	
Men's	1969 Indoor	Herb Washington	55 meters	3rd	
Men's	1969 Indoor	Bill Wehrwein	600 yards	1st	
Men's	1969 Outdoor	Bill Wehrwein	400 meters	3rd	
Men's	1969 Outdoor	Pat Wilson	4 × 400 meters relay	8th	
Men's	1969 Outdoor	John Mock	4 × 400 meters relay	8th	
Men's	1969 Outdoor	Roger Merchant	4 × 400 meters relay	8th	
Men's	1969 Outdoor	Bill Wehrwein	4 × 400 meters relay	8th	
Men's	1970 Indoor	Herb Washington	55 meters	1st	
Men's	1970 Indoor	Bill Wehrwein	600 yards	3rd	
Men's	1970 Indoor	John Mock	800 meters	3rd	
Men's	1970 Outdoor	Herb Washington	100 meters	7th	
Men's	1970 Outdoor	Wayne Hartwick	400 meters hurdles	8th	
Men's	1971 Indoor	Herb Washington	55 meters	2nd	
Men's	1971 Indoor	Ken Popejoy	Mile run	3rd	
Men's	1971 Indoor	Dave Dieters	Mile run	5th	
Men's	1971 Indoor	Mike Holt	4 × 400 meters relay	5th	
Men's	1971 Indoor	Mike Murphy	4 × 400 meters relay	5th	
Men's	1971 Indoor	John Mock	4 × 400 meters relay	5th	
Men's	1971 Indoor	Bob Casselman	4 × 400 meters relay	5th	
Men's	1971 Outdoor	Wayne Hartwick	400 meters hurdles	5th	
Men's	1972 Indoor	Herb Washington	55 meters	1st	
Men's	1972 Indoor	Robert Cassleman	600 yards	3rd	
Men's	1972 Indoor	Ken Popejoy	Mile run	1st	
Men's	1972 Indoor	Alwin Henderson	4 × 400 meters relay	3rd	
Men's	1972 Indoor	Marshall Dill	4 × 400 meters relay	3rd	
Men's	1972 Indoor	Mike Murphy	4 × 400 meters relay	3rd	
Men's	1972 Indoor	Bob Cassleman	4 × 400 meters relay	3rd	
Men's	1972 Outdoor	Ken Popejoy	1500 meters	6th	
Men's	1973 Indoor	Marshall Dill	55 meters	3rd	
Men's	1973 Indoor	Robert Cassleman	600 yards	3rd	
Men's	1973 Indoor	Ken Popejoy	Mile run	5th	
Men's	1973 Outdoor	Marshall Dill	200 meters	1st	
Men's	1973 Outdoor	Rob Cassleman	400 meters hurdles	3rd	
Men's	1973 Outdoor	Ken Popejoy	Mile run	5th	
Men's	1974 Indoor	Robert Cassleman	600 yards	3rd	
Men's	1974 Indoor	Bob Cassleman	4 × 400 meters relay	4th	
Men's	1974 Indoor	Bill Nance	4 × 400 meters relay	4th	
Men's	1974 Indoor	Mike Holt	4 × 400 meters relay	4th	
Men's	1974 Indoor	Marshall Dill	4 × 400 meters relay	4th	
Men's	1975 Indoor	Herb Lindsay	3000 meters	5th	
Men's	1975 Outdoor	Marshall Dill	100 meters	6th	
Men's	1976 Indoor	Herb Lindsay	5000 meters	5th	
Men's	1977 Indoor	Randy Smith	55 meters	5th	
Men's	1977 Indoor	Herb Lindsay	5000 meters	5th	
Men's	1977 Outdoor	Herb Lindsay	5000 meters	8th	
Men's	1978 Indoor	Dennis Lewis	High jump	2nd	
Men's	1979 Indoor	Keith Moore	1000 meters	4th	
Men's	1980 Indoor	Paul Piwnski	High jump	6th	
Men's	1982 Outdoor	Eliot Tabron	200 meters	8th	
Men's	1982 Outdoor	Eliot Tabron	400 meters	4th	
Women's	1982 Outdoor	Pam Sedwick	800 meters	7th	
Women's	1982 Outdoor	Ann Pewe	3000 meters	4th	
Women's	1982 Outdoor	Jill Washburn	10,000 meters	4th	
Men's	1983 Indoor	Marcus Sanders	600 yards	4th	
Women's	1983 Indoor	Julie Boerman	600 yards	5th	
Women's	1983 Indoor	Jacqui Sedwick	800 meters	2nd	
Women's	1983 Indoor	Jacqui Sedwick	4 × 400 meters relay	4th	
Women's	1983 Indoor	Julie Boerman	4 × 400 meters relay	4th	
Women's	1983 Indoor	Cassandra Burkett	4 × 400 meters relay	4th	
Women's	1983 Indoor	Judi Brown	4 × 400 meters relay	4th	
Men's	1983 Outdoor	Corky Wilkins	4 × 400 meters relay	3rd	
Men's	1983 Outdoor	Kelvin Scott	4 × 400 meters relay	3rd	
Men's	1983 Outdoor	Marcus Sanders	4 × 400 meters relay	3rd	
Men's	1983 Outdoor	Eliot Tabron	4 × 400 meters relay	3rd	
Men's	1983 Outdoor	Paul Piwinski	High jump	7th	
Women's	1983 Outdoor	Judi Brown	400 meters hurdles	1st	
Women's	1983 Outdoor	Jacqui Sedwick	800 meters	4th	
Women's	1984 Indoor	Jacqui Sedwick	800 meters	4th	
Women's	1984 Indoor	Vivian Fisher	Shot put	6th	
Women's	1985 Outdoor	Jacqui Sedwick	800 meters	7th	
Women's	1986 Outdoor	Odessa Smalls	100 meters	7th	
Women's	1986 Outdoor	Odessa Smalls	200 meters	6th	
Women's	1987 Indoor	Odessa Smalls	55 meters	6th	
Women's	1987 Outdoor	Mary Shea	10,000 meters	7th	
Men's	1992 Indoor	Rick Gledhill	4 × 800 meters relay	5th	
Men's	1992 Indoor	Chris Rugh	4 × 800 meters relay	5th	
Men's	1992 Indoor	Todd Koning	4 × 800 meters relay	5th	
Men's	1992 Indoor	Chris Brown	4 × 800 meters relay	5th	
Men's	1992 Outdoor	Anthony Hamm	10,000 meters	5th	
Men's	1994 Indoor	Brad Fields	200 meters	7th	
Women's	1994 Indoor	Susan Francis	200 meters	7th	
Men's	1995 Indoor	Brad Fields	200 meters	6th	
Men's	1996 Indoor	Brad Fields	200 meters	5th	
Women's	1996 Indoor	Chandra Burns	200 meters	6th	
Women's	1996 Outdoor	Chandra Burns	400 meters	8th	
Men's	1997 Indoor	Kyle Baker	3000 meters	5th	
Women's	1997 Indoor	Sevatheda Fynes	55 meters	1st	
Women's	1997 Indoor	Sevatheda Fynes	200 meters	3rd	
Women's	1997 Indoor	Stephanie Dueringer	5000 meters	8th	
Men's	1997 Outdoor	Kyle Baker	5000 meters	5th	
Women's	1997 Outdoor	Sevatheda Fynes	100 meters	1st	
Women's	1997 Outdoor	Sevatheda Fynes	200 meters	1st	
Women's	1997 Outdoor	Stephanie Dueringer	10,000 meters	5th	
Men's	1998 Indoor	Jim Jurcevich	5000 meters	8th	
Men's	1999 Indoor	Jim Jurcevich	5000 meters	8th	
Men's	1999 Outdoor	Jim Jurcevich	10,000 meters	5th	
Men's	2000 Outdoor	Steve Schell	10,000 meters	6th	
Women's	2000 Outdoor	Jennifer Denkins	10,000 meters	6th	
Men's	2001 Indoor	Paul Terek	Pole vault	8th	
Men's	2001 Outdoor	Paul Terek	Decathlon	4th	
Men's	2002 Indoor	Paul Terek	Pole vault	2nd	
Men's	2002 Outdoor	Paul Terek	Decathlon	2nd	
Women's	2002 Outdoor	Jamie Krzyminski	10,000 meters	7th	
Women's	2003 Outdoor	Jamie Krzyminski	10,000 meters	5th	
Men's	2004 Indoor	Steve Sherer	Mile run	6th	
Women's	2004 Indoor	Jamie Krzyminski	5000 meters	8th	
Women's	2004 Outdoor	Jamie Krzyminski	10,000 meters	3rd	
Women's	2004 Outdoor	Sherita Williams	Triple jump	8th	
Men's	2006 Indoor	Brad Gebauer	Pole vault	4th	
Women's	2006 Outdoor	Nicole Bush	3000 meters steeplechase	5th	
Women's	2007 Outdoor	Nicole Bush	3000 meters steeplechase	6th	
Women's	2008 Indoor	Nicole Bush	3000 meters	6th	
Women's	2008 Indoor	Nicole Bush	5000 meters	4th	
Women's	2009 Outdoor	Nicole Bush	3000 meters steeplechase	2nd	
Women's	2009 Outdoor	Lisa Senakiewich	5000 meters	4th	
Men's	2010 Indoor	Kyron Foster	Triple jump	6th	
Women's	2010 Outdoor	Emily MacLeod	5000 meters	6th	
Women's	2010 Outdoor	Beth Rohl	Discus throw	5th	
Men's	2011 Indoor	Lonnie Pugh	Weight throw	5th	
Women's	2011 Indoor	Beth Rohl	Weight throw	8th	
Men's	2011 Outdoor	Lonnie Pugh	Discus throw	8th	
Women's	2011 Outdoor	Emily MacLeod	5000 meters	7th	
Women's	2011 Outdoor	Beth Rohl	Discus throw	6th	
Men's	2012 Indoor	Zach Hill	Shot put	6th	
Men's	2012 Indoor	Lonnie Pugh	Weight throw	6th	
Women's	2012 Indoor	Tori Franklin	Triple jump	3rd	
Women's	2012 Indoor	Beth Rohl	Weight throw	5th	
Women's	2012 Outdoor	Beth Rohl	Discus throw	4th	
Men's	2013 Indoor	Antonio James	Weight throw	2nd	
Women's	2013 Indoor	Beth Rohl	Weight throw	2nd	
Women's	2013 Outdoor	Leah Falland	3000 meters steeplechase	5th	
Women's	2013 Outdoor	Tori Franklin	Triple jump	4th	
Women's	2013 Outdoor	Beth Rohl	Discus throw	3rd	
Men's	2014 Indoor	Antonio James	Weight throw	4th	
Women's	2014 Indoor	Leah Falland	Mile run	7th	
Women's	2014 Indoor	Tori Franklin	Triple jump	5th	
Women's	2014 Outdoor	Leah Falland	3000 meters steeplechase	1st	
Men's	2015 Indoor	Tim Ehrhardt	Heptathlon	7th	
Women's	2015 Indoor	Leah Falland	Mile run	1st	
Men's	2015 Outdoor	Antonio James	Discus throw	4th	
Women's	2015 Outdoor	Leah Falland	3000 meters steeplechase	3rd	
Women's	2015 Outdoor	Tori Franklin	Triple jump	5th	
Women's	2016 Outdoor	Katelyn Daniels	Discus throw	5th	
Men's	2017 Indoor	Tim Ehrhardt	Pole vault	4th	
Men's	2017 Outdoor	Justine Kiprotich	1500 meters	2nd	
Women's	2017 Outdoor	Katelyn Daniels	Discus throw	6th	
Men's	2018 Outdoor	Justine Kiprotich	1500 meters	7th	
Men's	2018 Outdoor	Tim Ehrhardt	Decathlon	6th	
Women's	2018 Outdoor	Katelyn Daniels	Discus throw	8th	
Men's	2019 Indoor	Nick Guerrant	Heptathlon	3rd	
Men's	2019 Outdoor	Justine Kiprotich	1500 meters	2nd	
Women's	2019 Outdoor	Dillon McClintock	1500 meters	5th	
Men's	2021 Indoor	Morgan Beadlescomb	5000 meters	3rd	
Women's	2021 Indoor	Jenna Magness	5000 meters	7th	
Women's	2021 Indoor	Rebecca Mammel	Weight throw	8th	
Men's	2021 Outdoor	Morgan Beadlescomb	5000 meters	8th	
Women's	2021 Outdoor	Jenna Magness	5000 meters	4th	
Women's	2021 Outdoor	Sophia Franklin	Pole vault	8th	
Men's	2022 Indoor	Morgan Beadlescomb	Mile run	2nd	
Women's	2022 Indoor	Jenna Magness	5000 meters	6th	
Men's	2022 Outdoor	Morgan Beadlescomb	5000 meters	2nd	
Women's	2022 Outdoor	Jenna Magness	10,000 meters	3rd	
Women's	2022 Outdoor	Sophia Franklin	Pole vault	7th	
Men's	2023 Indoor	Trevor Stephenson	Pole vault	4th	
Men's	2023 Indoor	Heath Baldwin	Heptathlon	7th	
Men's	2023 Outdoor	Heath Baldwin	Decathlon	5th	
Men's	2024 Indoor	Heath Baldwin	Heptathlon	2nd	

== See also ==
- Category:Michigan State Spartans men's track and field athletes (18)
- Category:Michigan State Spartans women's track and field athletes (8)
