= Tabron =

Tabron is a surname. Notable people with the surname include:

- Chris Tabron (born 1981), American record producer
- Eliot Tabron (born 1960), American sprinter
