= 3000 meters at the NCAA Division I Outdoor Track and Field Championships =

This is a list of the NCAA Division I outdoor champions in the 3000 meters event or its imperial equivalent two miles. The two miles was a men's event contested from 1921 to 1958, though it was replaced by the 5000 meters in post-1936 Olympic years until its discontinuation after 1958. The women's 3000 meters was part of the program since the inception of women's events in 1982 until the event was removed after the 2000 season. In 2001, the 3000 meter steeplechase was introduced into the women's program. Hand timing was used throughout the duration of the two miles, while automatic timing was used for the 3000 meters.

== Women's 3000 meters ==
Key
A=Altitude assisted

Year	Name, (Country)	Team	Time
1982	Ceci Hopp	Stanford	9:28.92
1983	Alison Wiley Canada	Stanford	09:03.5
1984	Cathy Branta	Wisconsin	08:59.6
1985	Cathy Branta	Wisconsin	09:08.3
1986	Lisa Breiding	Kentucky	09:11.4
1987	Vicki Huber	Villanova	08:54.4
1988	Vicki Huber	Villanova	08:47.4
1989	Vicki Huber	Villanova	9:06.96
1990	Sonia O'Sullivan Ireland	Villanova	08:56.3
1991	Sonia O'Sullivan Ireland	Villanova	08:56.7
1992	Nnenna Lynch	Villanova	09:24.6
1993	Clare Eichner	Wisconsin	09:03.1
1994	Karen Hecox	UCLA	09:22.6
1995	Kathy Butler Canada	Wisconsin	09:09.0
1996	Kathy Butler Canada	Wisconsin	09:16.2
1997	Kathy Butler Canada	Wisconsin	09:01.2
1998	Monal Chokshi	Stanford	09:20.2
1999	Carrie Tollefson	Villanova	09:26.5
2000	Kara Wheeler	Colorado	09:02.2

== Men's two miles ==
Key
y=yards
A=Altitude affected

Year	Name, (Country)	Team	Time
1921	John Romig	Penn St	09:31.0
1922	Lloyd Rathbun	Iowa St	09:32.1
1923	Verne Booth	Johns Hopkins	09:32.2
1924	not held		
1925	John Devine	Wash St	09:32.8
1926	Arnold Gillette	Montana	09:40.3
1927	Melvin Shimek	Marquette	09:34.4
1928	David Abbott	Illinois	09:28.8
1929	David Abbott	Illinois	09:30.0
1930	Harold Manning	Wichita St	09:18.1
1931	Clark Chamberlain	Michigan St	09:23.0
1932	Charles Shugert	Miami Ohio	09:16.7
1933	Michael Pilbrow	Grinnell	09:22.8
1934	Frank Crowley	Manhattan	09:22.4
1935	Floyd Lochner	Oklahoma	09:26.8
1936	not held		
1937	Greg Rice	Notre Dame	09:14.2
1938	Walter Mehl	Wisconsin	09:11.1
1939	Greg Rice	Notre Dame	09:02.6
1940	Roy Fehr	Michigan St	09:18.9
1941	Fred Wilt	Indiana	09:14.4
1942	Art Cazares	Fresno St	09:10.0
1943	Jerry Thompson	Texas	09:29.9
1944	Francis Martin	Notre Dame	09:38.4
1945	Francis Martin	New York	09:25.5
1946	Francis Martin	New York	09:38.3
1947	Jerry Thompson	Texas	9:22.9A
1948	not held		
1949	Horace Ashenfelter	Penn St	09:03.9
1950	Don McEwen	Michigan	09:01.9
1951	Don McEwen	Michigan	09:03.2
1952	not held		
1953	Rich Ferguson	Iowa	09:02.7
1954	Kikuo Moriya Japan	Wheaton IL	09:22.7
1955	Ken Reiser	Oregon	09:04.5
1956	not held		
1957	Charles "Deacon" Jones	Iowa	08:57.0
1958	Alex Henderson	Arizona St	08:46.3
