= Leah Falland =

American steeplechase runner

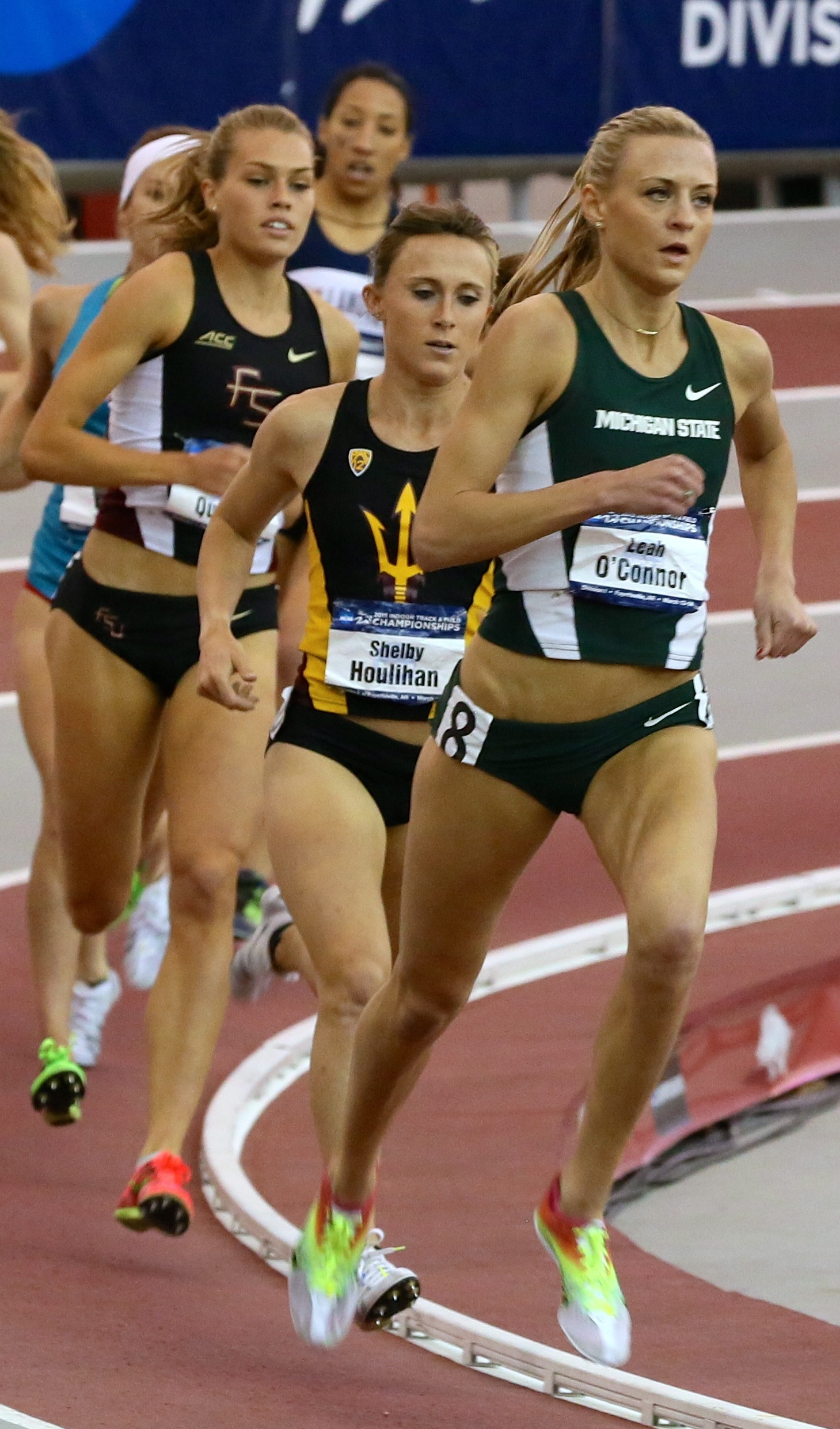
- Falland leading Shelby Houlihan and Colleen Quigley at the 2015 NCAA Division I Indoor Track and Field Championships

Personal information
- Nationality: American
- Born: Leah O'Connor; August 30, 1992 (age 33)
- Home town: Croswell, Michigan
- Height: 171 cm (5 ft 7 1/2 in)
- Weight: 55 kg (121 lb)
- Website: https://leahkayo.wordpress.com/

Sport
- Sport: Athletics
- Event(s): 3000 metres steeplechase, mile run
- College team: Michigan State Spartans
- Club: On Athletics Club

Achievements and titles
- Personal best: 3000m SC: 9:16.96 (2021)

Leah Falland (née O'Connor; born 30 August 1992) is an American steeplechase runner and NCAA DI indoor track and field championships record holder in the mile run.

== Biography ==
O'Connor was raised in Croswell, Michigan where she first learned to run on her family farm. She attended Croswell-Lexington High School and was state champion in the 800 m and 1600 m.

She competed collegiately for the Michigan State Spartans track and field and cross country teams starting in 2011, and qualified for the NCAA Division I Women's Outdoor Track and Field Championships every year from 2012 to 2015.

Her best NCAA finishes were 1st in the steeplechase at the 2014 NCAA Division I Outdoor Track and Field Championships, and 1st at the 2015 NCAA Indoor championships mile run in a championship record time of 4:27.18.

O'Connor competed in the 2016 United States Olympic Trials, where she won her semi-final of the women's steeplechase despite competing with a torn plantar fascia. She was 14th in the final the next day. In 2018, Falland set the Drake Relays record in the steeplechase with a time of 9:32.23.

At the 2021 United States Olympic trials, Falland tripped and fell in the steeplechase final, finishing 9th and failing again to qualify for the Olympic team.

From August 2020 to October 2022, Falland was a member of the professional training group On Athletics Club and was coached by Dathan Ritzenhein.

== Statistics ==
=== Personal bests ===
Event	Mark	Competition	Venue	Date
3000 metres steeplechase	9:16.96	Stockholm Diamond League	Stockholm, Sweden	4 July 2021
Mile run	4:27.18i	2015 NCAA Division I Indoor Track and Field Championships	Fayetteville, Arkansas	14 March 2015
