= Brant Little =

Canadian middle-distance runner (1906–1980)

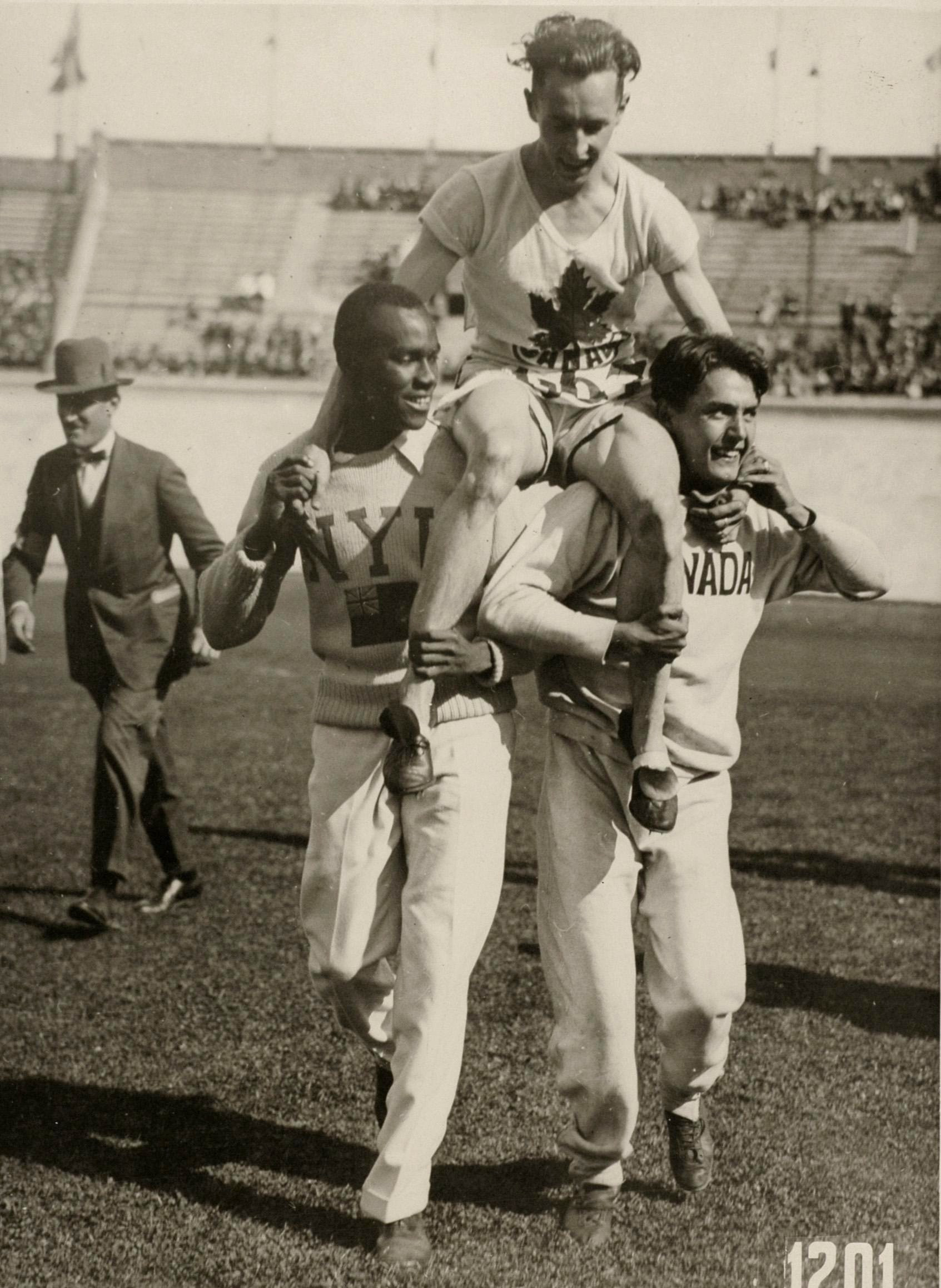
- Little (right) with Phil Edwards hoisting Percy Williams aloft after Williams' victory in the 100 metres in 1928

Personal information
- Full name: George Brant Little
- Born: 4 December 1906 Boissevain, Manitoba, Canada
- Died: 27 June 1980 (aged 73)

Sport
- Sport: Middle-distance running
- Event: 800 metres

George Brant Little (4 December 1906 – 27 June 1980) was a Canadian middle-distance runner. He competed in the men's 800 metres at the 1928 Summer Olympics.

Competing for the Notre Dame Fighting Irish track and field team, Little was 3rd in the 800 m at the 1930 NCAA Track and Field Championships.
