= Holly Campbell =

- Campbell, c. 1930
- Born: March 1, 1907; Michigan
- Died: July 28, 1979 (aged 72); Illinois
- Known for: NCAA champion, hammer throw (1930); UM Track & Field Hall of Fame (2011)

Holly Edward Campbell (March 1, 1907 – July 28, 1979) was an American track and field athlete and engineer. As a member of the Michigan Wolverines men's track and field team, he won the 1930 NCAA Championship in the hammer throw. He later worked as an engineer in the mining and utilities businesses.

== Early years ==
Campbell was a native of Laurium located on the Keweenaw Peninsula at the northernmost portion of Michigan's Upper Peninsula. His father, Gordon R. Campbell, was an 1893 graduate of the University of Michigan and a mining executive and lawyer who helped organize the Calumet & Arizona Mining Company in 1901 and served as its president from 1921 to 1931.

== University of Michigan ==
Campbell attended the University of Michigan where he was a member of the Michigan Wolverines men's track and field team from 1927 to 1930. He won the 1930 NCAA Championship in the hammer throw with a distance of 162 feet, 8-1/4 inches. He was also a Big Ten Conference champion and an All-American in the event. And he finished second in the event at the 1927 NCAA Championships. He received a bachelor of arts degree from the University of Michigan in 1930.

In 2011, Campbell was posthumously inducted into the University of Michigan Track and Field Hall of Fame.

== Later years ==
After receiving his degree from the University of Michigan, Campbell also received a degree from the Michigan College of Mining & Technology (later renamed Michigan Technological University) in Houghton, Michigan. He thereafter remained in the Upper Peninsula where he worked as a mining engineer and at the Merchant & Miners Bank in Calumet, Michigan. He later lived in Dixon, Illinois, where he was employed as a civil engineer with the Illinois Northern Utilities Company (later renamed Commonwealth Edison). In 1945, he was married to Avis Toot (1905-1988) of Dixon. He died in July 1979 at age 72.
