= Harvey Newquist II =

American computer manufacturing executive (born 1932)

Harvey P. Newquist is an American athlete and computer manufacturing executive. Newquist was the first manufacturing vice president of minicomputer manufacturer Data General.

== Early life and education ==
Harvey Paul Newquist was born July 29, 1932, in Racine, WI, the fourth of five sons of Harvey Newquist and Mabel Hartmann. He attended Marmion Military Academy and graduated from DeKalb High School in DeKalb, IL in 1950. He received a degree in mechanical engineering from the University of Notre Dame in 1954. Competing for the Notre Dame Fighting Irish track and field team, he won three ND monograms and established six school records in hurdles, of which three still remain. He was an NCAA Championship finalist and qualified for the hurdle events in the 1952 and 1956 U.S. Olympic Team tryouts. He was mentioned in Who's Who in American Colleges and Universities.

== Career ==
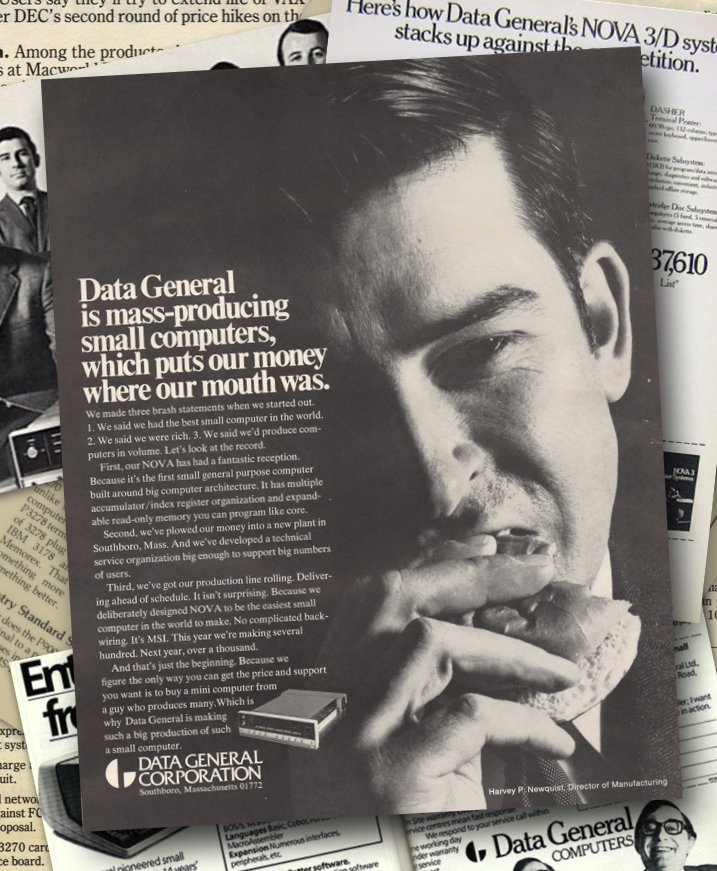
Early Data General advertisement featuring Harvey Newquist

Newquist's industrial management career included General Electric in Utica, NY where he led aerospace programs and the development of the existing U.S. Navy E3A aircraft. At the 3C-Honeywell firm in Framingham, MA, he produced minicomputers and simulators for the NASA Apollo Program. From 1968 to 1973, he led the manufacturing and field service operations at Data General Corporation. His work on minicomputers is featured in the Oral History collection of the Computer History Museum.

== Awards and honors ==
Newquist led the team responsible for the 1987 Papal Visit to Phoenix, AZ, and was awarded the papal medal Pro Ecclesia et Pontifice by John Paul II for his service to the Church.

== Personal life ==
Newquist married Patricia Starr on October 12, 1957, with whom he had eight children. They include writer HP Newquist and musician Jimmy Newquist.
