= Bob Carey (American football) =

American football player (1930–1988)

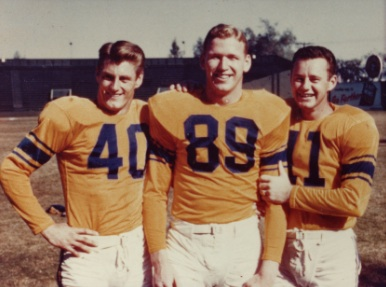
- Carey (No. 89) in 1952 with Los Angeles Rams teammates Elroy Hirsch (left) and Norm Van Brocklin (right)

No. 89, 88, 85
- Position: End

Personal information
- Born: February 8, 1930; Charlevoix, Michigan, U.S.
- Died: October 25, 1988 (aged 58); Fairfield, Ohio, U.S.
- Listed height: 6 ft 5 in (1.96 m)
- Listed weight: 219 lb (99 kg)

Career information
- College: Michigan State
- NFL draft: 1952: 1st round, 13th overall pick

Career history

Playing
- Los Angeles Rams (1952, 1954, 1956); Chicago Bears (1958)

Coaching
- Arizona State (1955) Ends

Awards and highlights
- Consensus All-American (1951); Second-team All-American (1950)

Career NFL statistics
- Receptions: 47
- Receiving yards: 663
- Receiving touchdowns: 2
- Stats at Pro Football Reference

Robert Winfield Carey (February 8, 1930 – October 25, 1988) was an American professional football player who was an end in the National Football League (NFL). He was a first-round pick (13th overall) by the Los Angeles Rams in the 1952 NFL draft from Michigan State University. He played three seasons with the Rams between 1952 and 1956 and one season with the Chicago Bears in 1958.

== Michigan State University Two Sport All-American ==
Carey earned a total of nine varsity athletic letters at Michigan State: three each in football, basketball and track. In his era, freshmen were not eligible for varsity competition. As captain of the undefeated Spartan 1951 football team, he earned consensus first-team All-America honors at end and was a member of the 1951 College Football All-America Team. Carey had also received All-American recognition in football by the Associated Press in 1950. He was Michigan State's receptions leader for three seasons, 1949–1951. His single season record of eight touchdown catches in 1949 stood for 68 years until Felton Davis III caught nine touchdowns in 2017. In 2001, he was chosen as a member of Michigan State's All Time Football Team by Althon Sports. Carey was also the 1951 Big Ten Conference Shot Put Champion. His third-place finish in the shot put at the 1951 NCAA Track & Field Championships placed him on National Collegiate Track Coaches All-American team. He was selected as a charter member of Michigan State's Athletics Hall of Fame in 1992.

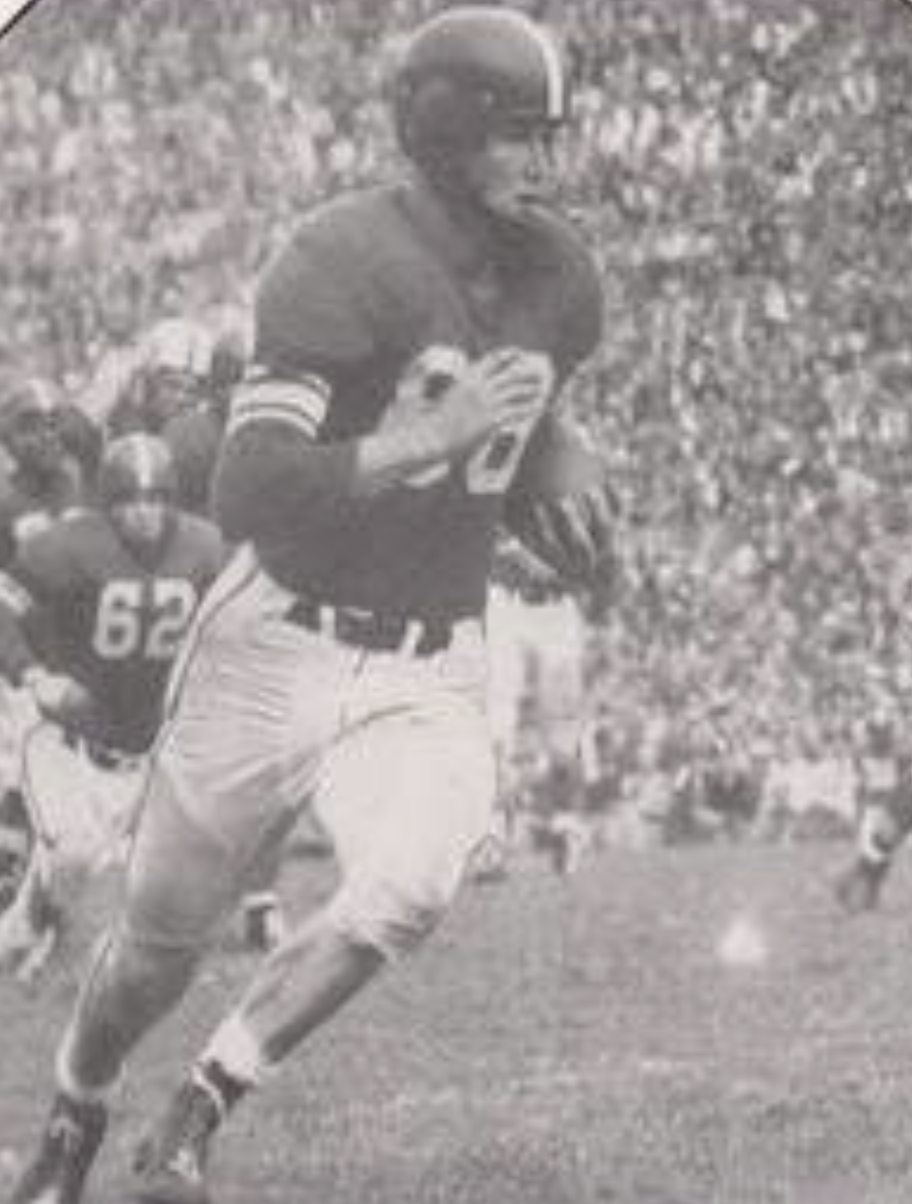
Captain Bob Carey advances the ball for #1 nationally ranked Michigan State vs. #7 Ohio State in Columbus on October 6, 1951. After mounting a late 4th Qtr. rally, MSU defeated the Buckeyes 24–20 to retain their position atop the national polls.

Carey was competitive in three sports, becoming an All American in two, track & field and football. Carey was also a three-year starter for the Michigan State basketball team playing for Naismith Memorial Basketball Hall of Fame coach Pete Newell.

Spartan football coach and College Football Hall of Fame member Biggie Munn called Carey "the greatest all-around athlete I've ever seen or hope to see." As a senior at State, he won the Chester L. Brewer Award, given annually to a graduating senior for "distinguished performance in athletics and scholarship, and for possessing a high degree of character, personality, competitive spirit and other leadership qualities which forecast a successful future."

== 1952 College All Star Team Selection ==
Carey was selected as a member of the Chicago Tribune's 1952 College All Star Team. Teammates on the All-Star roster included future NFL Hall of Famers Ollie Matson, Frank Gifford, Hugh McElhenny and Les Richter. Played at Soldier Field in front of 88,316 fans, the college stars lost 10–7 forcing the defending NFL champion Los Angeles Rams to come from behind to win. Carey caught a key pass in the All Star's 69-yard first half touchdown drive which temporarily put them in the lead.

== 1952 NFL season ==
Carey joined the Rams following the Chicago All Star game. In his first pro campaign he earned five regular season starts. This was despite a Ram roster which included future NFL Hall of Famers Elroy “Crazylegs” Hirsch and Tom Fears. Carey finished the season as the #2 receiver with 36 catches for 539 yards and one TD, a 61-yard catch vs. the Bears at Wrigley Field. He missed his one field goal attempt. The 1952 National Football League season resulted in a tie for the National Conference championship between Detroit and the Rams, requiring a one-game playoff. The Lions prevailed 31–21 in Detroit. Carey caught 3 passes for 30 yards, the longest went for 19. He fumbled once. The next week Detroit went on to defeat the Cleveland Browns in the NFL title game, while Carey married his college sweetheart Lynn Laue. Carey was named Rookie of the Year following the season.

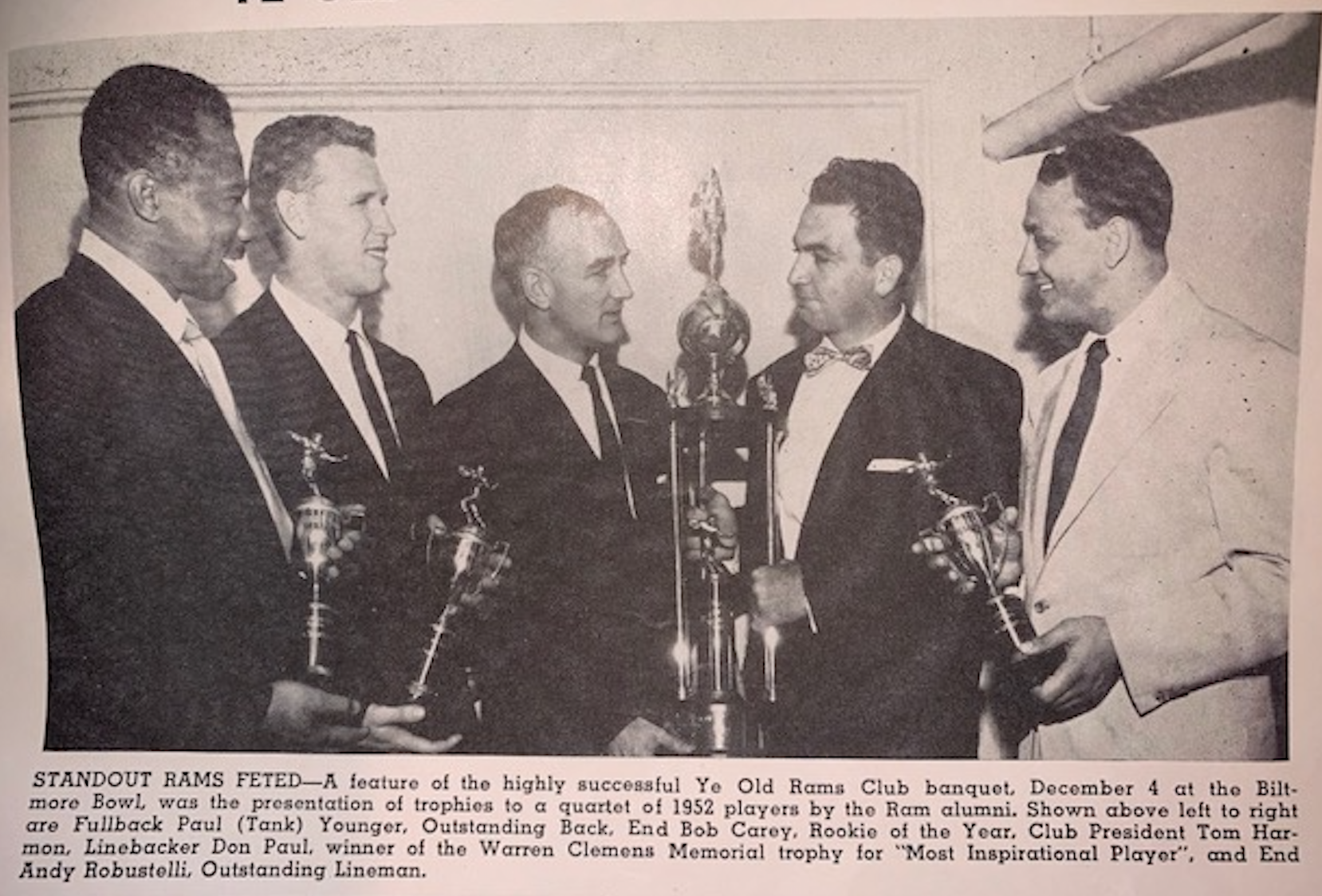
Rams 1952 Rookie-of-the-Year Bob Carey joins team members Tank Younger, Don Paul, Andy Robustelli and awards presenter Tom Harmon.

== 1953 US Army Service ==
Carey and twin brother Bill were ROTC graduates of Michigan State. In ’53 both were called to service. Bob sat out the fall pro campaign and was stationed at Ft. Benning, Georgia. Following completion of his military obligation he returned to the Rams for the 1954 season.

== 1954 NFL season ==
The Rams squared off against Baltimore away in Memorial Stadium in the season opener. Los Angeles crushed the Colts 48–0 with Carey kicking a 21-yard field goal in the 1st Qtr. He finished the contest with 5 catches for 49 yards. In week two the Rams faced the 49ers in the LA Coliseum. The crowd of 93,621 saw the game end in a 24–24 tie. Early in the contest Carey suffered a serious knee injury. Reconstructive surgery followed, ending Carey’s second NFL season.

== Arizona State University assistant football coach ==
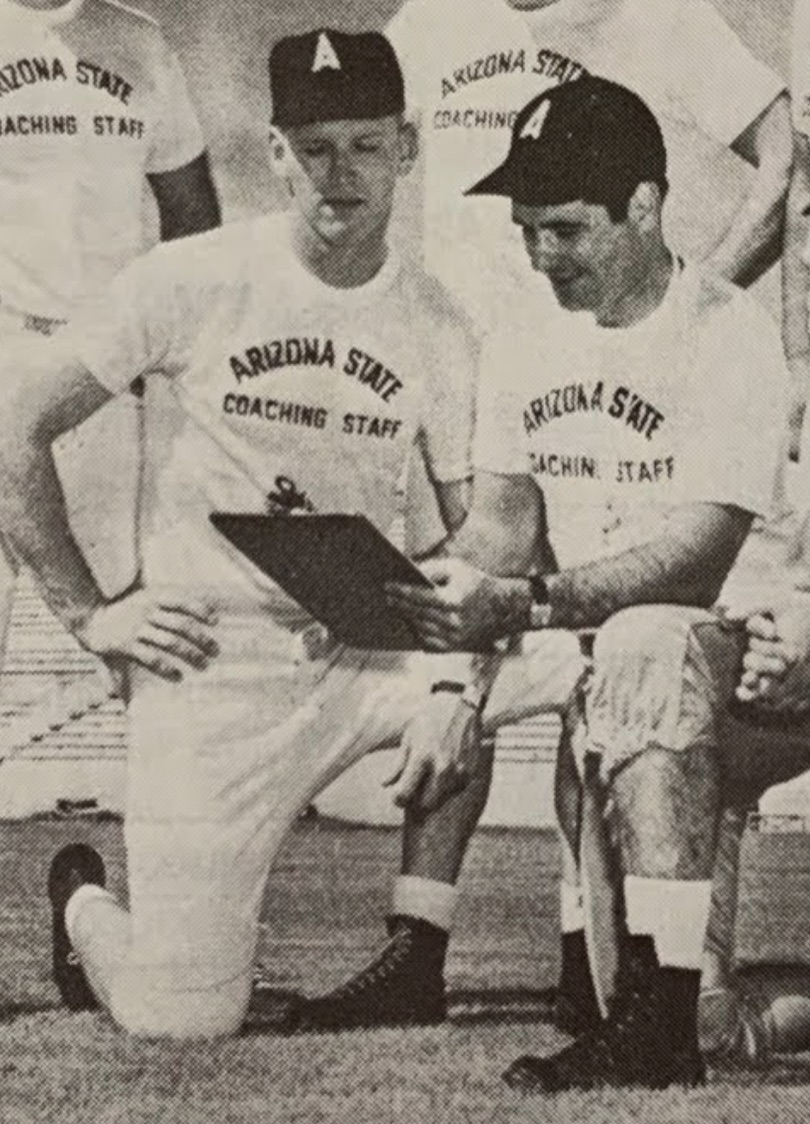
Arizona State End Coach Bob Carey (left) and Head Coach Dan Devine.

Following Carey's severe knee injury, he spent 1955 in rehabilitation and was hired as end coach on the staff of eventual College Football Hall of Fame coach Dan Devine at Arizona State. The Sun Devils finished 8–2–1 for the season. Devine went on to serve in head coaching positions at the University of Missouri, the Green Bay Packers and at the University of Notre Dame, where he won a national championship in 1977. Following the '55 Arizona State campaign, Carey rejoined the Rams in LA for the 1956 season.

== 1956 NFL season and first retirement ==
Carey rejoined the Rams in August 1956. The receiving corps included “Crazylegs” Hirsch, Tom Fears, Bob Boyd, Leon Clarke and Carey. In another injury plagued season, Carey was limited to seven games, starting four. He finished the campaign with 5 catches for 60 yards and one touchdown, that on a 15 yard pass from Ram QB Bill Wade in the final contest played vs. the Bears in Wrigley Field. Following the season Carey announced his retirement.

== Return to the NFL and 1958 season ==
In early 1958 the Chicago Bears acquired rights to Carey who had begun a second career outside of football. Following negotiations with his employer, Bears owner George Halas persuaded him to return to football. Carey, who was living in Chicago, joined the Bears at training camp in Rensselaer Indiana at St. Joseph's College. In ’58 Carey played in 11 games and had one reception made in the Bears 35–41 loss in front of 100,470 fans in the LA Coliseum. That catch proved to be the final of his career. The Bears finished the season 8–4, one game behind eventual World Champions the Baltimore Colts. He finally retired from football at season end electing not to return in 1959.

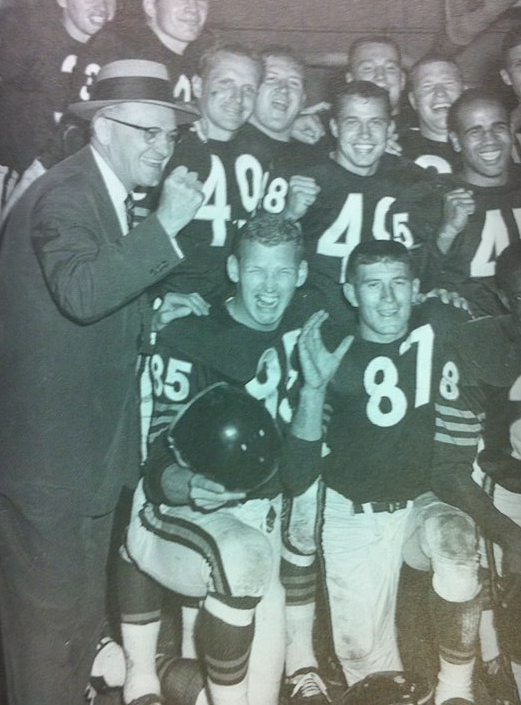
George Halas, Bob Carey #85 (front row, center), Harlon Hill #87 and Chicago Bear teammates celebrate their 28–6 Wrigley Field win over the 49ers in 1958.

== Charlevoix High School Athletics ==
Bob and his fraternal twin brother Bill grew up in an athletic family in northern Michigan. The six Carey brothers were well known in the region. Twins Bob and Bill were members of the legendary 1945 Charlevoix, Michigan football team that went undefeated and unscored upon. Bob stood 6 feet, 5 inches and weighed 215 pounds, while Bill measured in at 6 feet, 1 inch and 190 pounds. Bill himself earned five varsity letters at MSU and was eventually drafted by the San Francisco 49ers in 1952.

The 1945 team was coached by Ray Kipke, for whom Charlevoix's football stadium is now named, and the inspiration behind the change in spelling of the school's nickname from Raiders to Rayders. The 1958 Charlevoix squad repeated with an undefeated/unscored upon season coached by Bob's older brother Don Carey, a member of the Michigan High School Coaches Hall of Fame who, along with his brothers, had an outstanding athletic career at Charlevoix. No other high school team in Michigan playing full seasons has ever matched the twin accomplishments of Charlevoix's 1945 and 1958 teams.

The 1945 Rayders finished 6–0, with shutouts of Grayling, 25–0; Mancelona, 25–0; Boyne City, 33–0; East Jordan, 24–0; Harbor Springs, 64–0; and Pellston, 58–0. That team also went 8–0, won the conference championship, and finished the season ranked No. 1 in the UPI Class C poll, outscoring its opponents 260–19.

In the 15 years from 1945 to 1959, Charlevoix won 11 Northern Michigan Class C Conference championships, six of which were consecutive. The combined record of the 1945 and 1958 teams was 92–11–4 record.

The 1945 team was composed of Dick Joliffe, Jerry Ypma, Frank Martin, Bill Carey, Bud Fox, Jim Roberts, Bill Joliffe, Don Zietler, Bernie Zietler, Bill Poole, Irving Manville, Nelson Sweitzer, Bob Crain, Dick Hardy, Jack Mol, Bernie Ward Jr., Don Brown, Em Howe, Lyle King, Bob Carey, Vince Olach, Jack Roberts, Cliff Lagerman, Bob Shanahan, Warren Shadko, Dick Donaldson, Arnie Loper, Des Milligan, Jack Kline and Pat Martin. The manager was Chuck Fairbanks, who went on to play football at Michigan State. Fairbanks later served as head coach at the University of Oklahoma, the University of Colorado (Boulder) and in the NFL as head coach of the New England Patriots.

== Michigan Sports Hall of Fame ==
Carey was inducted into the Michigan Sports Hall of Fame in 1990. The organization's mission and vision are "to honor the outstanding men and women athletes, amateur and professional, whose skills and deeds bring great honor to the State of Michigan."

== Michigan State University Athletics Hall of Fame ==
In 1992 Carey was elected as a charter member of MSU's Athletic Hall of Fame. Other Michigan State legends in his class included Magic Johnson, Bubba Smith, Duffy Daugherty, Biggie Munn, Gene Washington and George Webster. A total of 30 MSU athletes, coaches and administrators were selected for the honor.

== Later life ==
Carey raised a family of four children with his wife Lynn, eventually settling in the Cincinnati, Ohio suburb of Glendale. His interest in football continued, and he served as an occasional scout for NFL teams. He died after a brief illness in 1988 at age 58.

=== Michigan State's All-Time Team ===
- Chosen in 2001 by Athlon Sports
