= Eliot Tabron =

American sprinter (born 1960)

Personal information
- Born: May 23, 1960 (age 66) Detroit, Michigan, United States

Sport
- Sport: Track and field
Medal record
Representing United States
Summer Universiade
Gold medal – first place	1983 Edmonton	4x400m relay

Eliot Tabron (born May 23, 1960) is an American former sprinter.

Tabron was a multiple-time All-American for the Michigan State Spartans track and field team, anchoring their 3rd-place 4 × 400 meters relay team at the 1983 NCAA Division I Outdoor Track and Field Championships.
