= David Abbott (runner) =

American long-distance runner

Personal information
- Full name: David Abbott
- Born: March 8, 1902 Providence, Rhode Island, United States
- Died: May 19, 1987 (aged 85) Brooksville, Maine, United States

Sport
- Sport: Long-distance running
- Event: 5000 metres

David Abbott (March 8, 1902 – May 19, 1987) was an American long-distance runner.

== Career ==
Abbott started his career while studying at University of Illinois, where he won an NCAA national championship in the two-mile race. He competed in the men's 5000 metres at the 1928 Summer Olympics, where he was eliminated in the preliminary heats.
