= 1930 NCAA Track and Field Championships =

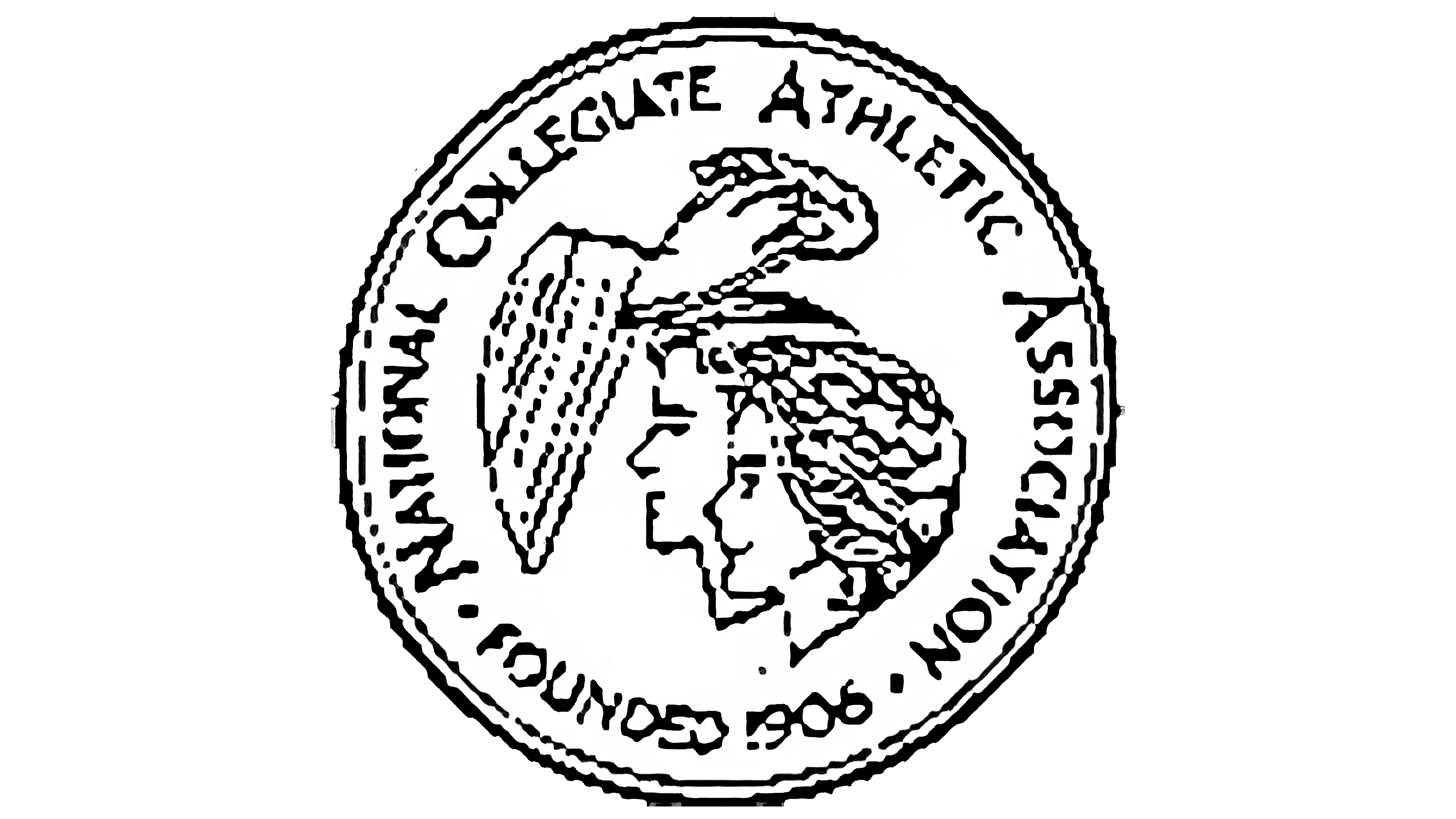
- Team Champion: USC (2nd title)
- Edition: 9th
- Dates: June 6-7, 1930
- Host city: (Illinois) Chicago, Illinois; University of Chicago
- Venue: Stagg Field
- Events: 14

The 1930 NCAA Track and Field Championships was the ninth NCAA track and field championship. The event was held at Stagg Field in Chicago, Illinois in June 1930. The University of Southern California won the team title. The highlight of the meet was a new world record in the 100-yard dash, as Frank Wykoff ran the event in 9.4 seconds. Wykoff's time broke the prior world record of 9.5 seconds set by Eddie Tolan.

== Team scoring ==
1. University of Southern California - 57-27/70
2. Washington - 40
3. Iowa - 30-1/7
4. Ohio State - 29-1/10
5. Stanford - 28
6. Illinois - 27-17/70
7. Michigan - 20-1/7
8. Indiana - 20
9. Oregon - 12
10. Wisconsin - 11-1/10

== Track events ==
=== 100-yard dash ===
1. Frank Wykoff, USC - 9.4 seconds (new world record)
2. George Simpson, Ohio State
3. Edwin Toppino, Loyola (New Orleans)
4. Eddie Tolan, Michigan
5. Claude Bracey, Rice

=== 120-yard high hurdles ===
1. Steve Anderson, Washington - 14.4 (equals world record)
2. Lee Sentman, Illinois
3. James Hatfield, Indiana
4. W. Lamson, Nebraska
5. John Morris, Southwest Louisiana Institute

=== 220-yard dash ===
1. George Simpson, Ohio State - 20.7 seconds (new NCAA record)
2. Cy Leland, Texas Christian
3. Eddie Tolan, Michigan
4. C.M. Farmer, North Carolina
5. Allen East, Chicago

=== 220-yard low hurdles ===
1. Lee Sentman, Illinois - 23.2 seconds (equals NCAA record)
2. Richard Rockaway, Ohio State
3. Steve Anderson, Washington
4. O.R. Welch, Missouri
5. E. Payne, USC

=== 440-yard dash ===
1. Reginald Bowen, Pitt - 48 seconds
2. Victor Williams, USC
3. Russell Walter, Northwestern
4. A. Wilson, Notre Dame
5. T. Hartley, Washington

=== 880-yard run ===
1. Orval Martin, Purdue - 1:54.2 (new NCAA record)
2. Dale Letts, Chicago
3. Brant Little, Notre Dame
4. Ralph Wolf, Northwestern
5. William McGeagh, USC

=== One-mile run ===
1. Joseph Sivak, Butler - 4:19.3
2. Rufus Kiser, Washington
3. Joseph Mackeever, Illinois
4. Ray Swartz, Western Michigan
5. L. Erwall, Carleton College

=== Two-mile run ===
1. Harold Manning, Wichita - 9:18.1 (new NCAA record)
2. H.A. Brockwaithe, Indiana
3. W.E. Clapham, Indiana
4. Russell Putnam, Iowa State
5. C.E. Meisinger, Penn State

== Field events ==
=== Broad jump ===
1. Edward Gordon, Iowa - 25 feet
2. Ed Hamm, Georgia Tech
3. R. Barber, USC
4. D. Hamilton, Colorado
5. D. Graydon, Georgia Tech

=== High jump ===
1. James Stewart, USC - 6 feet, 3-3/4 inches
2. M. Ehrlich, Kansas City State Agricultural College
3. R. Bowa, Mississippi A&M
4. M. Strong, Southwestern State Teachers
5. C. Bradey, Louisville
6. Parker Shelby, Oklahoma

=== Pole vault ===
1. Tommy Warne, Northwestern - 13 feet, 9 inches (new NCAA record)
2. L.L. Lansrud, Drake
3. W. Hubbard, USC
4. P. Miller, Washington University in St. Louis
5. R. Robinson, Oregon

=== Discus throw ===
1. Paul Jessup, Washington - 160 feet, 9-3/8 inches (new NCAA record)
2. Eric Krenz, Stanford
3. Edward Moeller, Oregon
4. Hall, USC
5. Harlow Rothert, Stanford

=== Javelin ===
1. Kenneth Churchill, California - 204 feet, 2 inches
2. L. Friedman, Geneva College
3. Jess Mortensen, USC
4. L.D. Weldon, Iowa
5. O.E. Nelson, Iowa

=== Shot put ===
1. Harlow Rothert, Stanford - 52 feet, 1-3/4 inches (new NCAA record)
2. Eric Krenz, Stanford
3. H. Rhea, Nebraska
4. Paul Jessup, Washington
5. Sam Behr, Wisconsin

=== Hammer throw ===
1. Holly Campbell, Michigan - 162 feet, 8-1/4 inches
2. J.M. Gilchrist, Iowa
3. Arthur Frisch, Wisconsin
4. W.J. Youngerman, Iowa
5. J.O. Hart, Iowa

== See also ==
- NCAA Men's Outdoor Track and Field Championship
