= Olivia Markezich =

American middle and long-distance runner

- Markezich at the 2024 NCAA Division I Indoor Track and Field Championships

Personal information
- Nationality: American
- Born: August 10, 2000 (age 25)

Sport
- Country: United States
- Sport: Track and field
- Event(s): Middle-, long-distance running
- College team: Notre Dame

Olivia Markezich (born 10 August 2000) is an American middle and long-distance runner. She was the 2023 NCAA Steeplechase champion.

== High school career ==
Markezich attended the Bear Creek School in Redmond, Washington. She was a 1A state champion in the 1600m as a junior and the 800m as a senior. She qualified for the Footlocker Nationals in her senior year, and placed 3rd in the 2000m steeplechase at the New Balance Nationals Outdoor.

== College career ==
In October 2018, Markezich signed her national letter of intent to run for the Notre Dame Fighting Irish. Initially she was on the team as a walk-on.

Markezich is the 2023 NCAA champion in the steeplechase, and a 10-time NCAA D1 All-American. She finished in the top three at seven NCAA championships. She was a dominant Atlantic Coast Conference performer, with five ACC championships, 14-time All-ACC performer and three-time ACC Women's Track Performer of the Year. She was also named to eight All-ACC academic teams.

On December 3, 2023, she ran the indoor 3000m in 8:40.42, breaking her own school record, and becoming the second fastest runner in NCAA history.

On February 17, 2024, Markezich ran the fastest 1600m split in the DMR in NCAA and USA history, with a 4:22.31. Notre Dame's DMR finishing time was 10:44.62.

In August 2023, Markezich was one of the first NCAA track athletes to sign an NIL deal. She signed with Swiss shoe company On.

== Professional career ==
In June 2024, Markezich signed a professional contract with Swiss shoe company On. She is based in Boulder, CO with the OAC Global team.

Markezich was in 2nd place with only 150 meters remaining in the 3000m steeplechase at the 2024 United States Olympic trials before a tough fall on the final barrier. She got up and finished 6th, with a personal best of 9:14.87.

Markezich made her Diamond League debut on July 7, 2024, in Paris, just 10 days after the US Olympic trials, where she finished 4th in a personal best of 9:14.67

== Results and personal bests ==
Information from World Athletics profile.

Championship results

Year	Meet	Venue	Event	Place	Time
2019	USA Junior Outdoor Championships	Ansin Sports Complex	Steeplechase	5th	11:01.78
2019	NCAA Cross Country Championships	Lavern Gibson	6k	143rd	21:35
2021	NCAA Indoor Championships	Randal Tyson Track Center	3000m	13th	9:21.74
2021	NCAA Outdoor Championships	Hayward Field	Steeplechase	10th	9:48.73
2021	US Olympic trials	Hayward Field	Steeplechase	H1 14th	10:00.45
2021	NCAA Cross Country Championships	Apalachee Regional Park	6k	11th	19:38.0
2022	NCAA Indoor Championships	Birmingham CrossPlex	DMR	8th	11:05.60
2022	NCAA Outdoor Championships	Hayward Field	Steeplechase	9th	9:35.80
2022	NCAA Cross Country Championships	Stillwater, OK	6k	8th	19:46.4
2023	NCAA Indoor Championships	Albuquerque Convention Center	3000m	2nd	9:13.01
2023	NCAA Indoor Championships	Albuquerque Convention Center	DMR	3rd	10:59.46
2023	NCAA Outdoor Championships	Mike A. Myers Stadium	Steeplechase	1st	9:25.03
2023	USA National Championships	Hayward Field	Steeplechase	4th	9:17.93
2023	NCAA Cross Country Championships	Charlottesville, Virginia	6k	3rd	19:10
2024	NCAA Indoor Championships	The Track at New Balance	3000m	2nd	8:46.71
2024	NCAA Indoor Championships	The Track at New Balance	DMR	2nd	10:53.14
2024	NCAA Outdoor Championships	Hayward Field	Steeplechase	2nd	9:17.36
2024	USA Olympic trials	Hayward Field	Steeplechase	6th	9:14.87
2025	USA Indoor Championships	Staten Island	3000m	7th	8:52.49

Personal Bests

Surface	Event	Time	Venue	Date
Indoor track	1 mile	4:27.76	Notre Dame, IN	Feb 2, 2024
Indoor track	3000m	8:37.37	New York City	Feb 8, 2025
Indoor track	5000m	15:14.42	Boston, MA	March 2, 2025
Outdoor track	1500m	4:07.43	Zagreb, Croatia	September 8, 2024
Outdoor track	1 mile	4:24.07	Boras, Sweden	August 21, 2024
Outdoor track	3000m	8:42.95	Rovereto, Italy	September 3, 2024
Outdoor track	5000m	15:23.14	Wake Forest University	May 11, 2024
Outdoor track	Steeplechase	9:14.67	Stade Sébastien Charléty	July 7, 2024

== Personal life ==
Markezich's father Ron also ran at Notre Dame, and was the school record holder in the 10,000m as part of the class of 1989. Markezich has three siblings, including a twin sister named Andrea who ran at the University of Washington before transferring to Notre Dame for her final year.
