= Don Elser =

American basketball and football player (1913–1968)

Personal information
- Born: August 4, 1913 Gary, Indiana
- Died: October 18, 1968 (aged 55) Gary, Indiana
- Listed height: 6 ft 4 in (1.93 m)
- Listed weight: 220 lb (100 kg)

Career information
- High school: Horace Mann (Gary, Indiana)
- College: Notre Dame (1933–1936)
- Position: Forward / center

Career history
- 1941–1942: Toledo Jim White Chevrolets
- 1945–1946: Boston Goodwins
- 1946–1947: Gary Ingots

Donald Lewis Elser (August 4, 1913 – October 18, 1968) was an American professional basketball and football player. He played in the National Basketball League for the Toledo Jim White Chevrolets during the 1941–42 season and averaged 4.5 points per game. Elser also played for the Boston Shamrocks in the American Football League (sometimes known as "AFL II"). While at Notre Dame, Elser was selected to play in the 1936 Chicago College All-Star Game.

Elser was also a standout track and field athlete in college. He finished in second place (behind Olympian Jesse Owens) in the 220-yard low hurdles at the 1936 NCAA Track and Field Championships. He also finished fifth in the shot put, earning All-American status in both events.
