= Francis Martin (runner) =

American distance runner

Francis Martin (born 15 March 1924), also known as Frank Martin, was an athlete and the 1946 winner of the USA Outdoor Track and Field Championships in the men's 5000m.

Competing for the Notre Dame Fighting Irish track and field team, Martin won the 1944 NCAA Track and Field Championships in the two miles. After transferring to the NYU Violets track and field team, he repeated as champion the following year and again in 1946.
