= Aubrey Lewis (athlete) =

American football player and track athlete

Aubrey Lewis (c. 1935 – December 10, 2001) was an American football player and track athlete who was the first African American to be captain of a Notre Dame Fighting Irish athletic team and a member of the first Federal Bureau of Investigation (FBI) agent training program to include black people.

== Early life and education ==
Born in Glen Ridge, New Jersey, Lewis grew up in nearby Montclair and attended Montclair High School, from which he graduated in 1954. When he first tried out for the Mounties football team, a doctor performing a physical detected a rapid heart rate. Lewis, who had had a heart murmur since childhood told the doctor "Oh, I ran here all the way from my house", and received approval to play. During his high school career at Montclair, Lewis played basketball and won two state football championships with the football team, scoring 49 touchdowns and running for nearly 4,500 rushing yards during his career. Lewis led Montclair to its second consecutive Group IV team championship and set state records in three different track and field events at the New Jersey Interscholastic Athletic Association's track and field championships in 1953, winning at both 100 yards (in 9.8 seconds) and 220 yards (with a time of 21 seconds) and won the discus event with a record throw of 154 feet 1 inch (46.96 m).

== College athletics ==
Lewis chose the University of Notre Dame from a list of 200 schools that had offered him scholarships and played halfback for the Notre Dame Fighting Irish football team. He was chosen by the Chicago Bears in the tenth round of the 1958 NFL draft, the 113th pick overall. An ankle injury prevented him from playing professionally. He won the NCAA's Division I championship in the 400 meter intermediate hurdles in 1956 but failed to make the United States team that would be competing at the 1956 Summer Olympics in Melbourne, Australia, after he stumbled over the last hurdle in his heat at the Olympic trials in Los Angeles. He went on to be elected as captain of the track team for the 1957–58 season, making him the first black athlete at the school to be chosen as a team captain.

In 1961, while he was working as the head coach at Paterson Central High School, Lewis was chosen as player-coach of a team representing Newark in the Metropolitan Indoor Football League, which planned to play seven-on-seven games indoors during the winter.

== Professional career ==
In 1962, he was chosen to participate as a member of the first Federal Bureau of Investigation agent training program to include black people in its 14-week-long training program held at the FBI Academy in Quantico, Virginia. In a September 1962 article in Ebony magazine, FBI Director J. Edgar Hoover described the expanded recruiting effort as justified "based on his feeling that Negroes 'need more heroes' to encourage their youngsters."

Lewis left the FBI in 1967 to take a position with Woolworth's, working with the firm in various roles, and was chosen as a senior vice president before his retirement in 1995. He was appointed to serve on both the New Jersey Sports and Exposition Authority and the New Jersey Highway Authority. Governor of New Jersey Christine Todd Whitman appointed Lewis in 1997 to serve as a commissioner of the bi-state Port Authority of New York and New Jersey, a position he filled until 1999.

== Death ==
Lewis died at Columbia-Presbyterian Medical Center on December 10, 2001, at the age of 66. He was survived by his wife, Ann, as well as by two daughters and three sons.
