= 1936 NCAA Track and Field Championships =

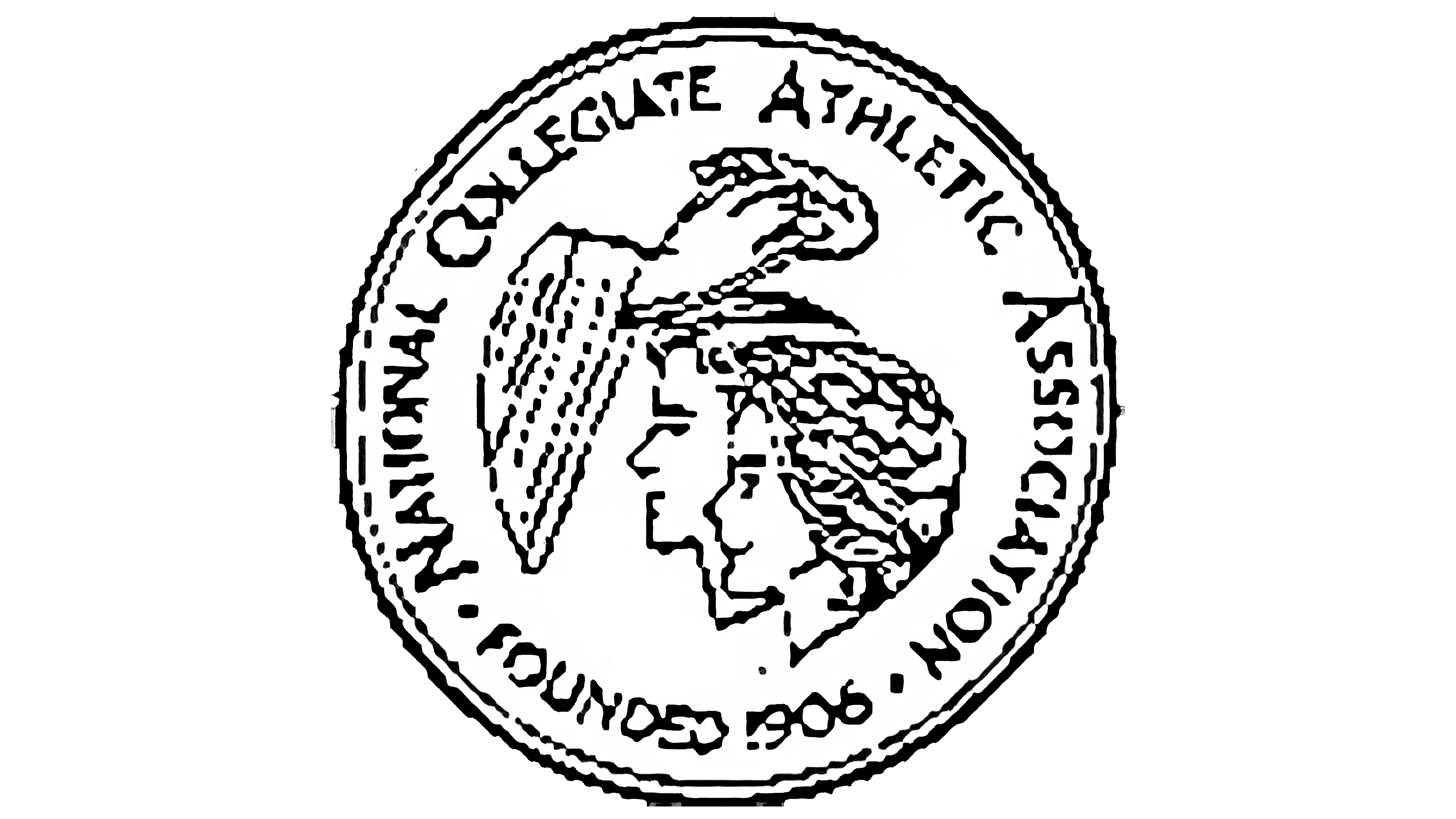
- Team Champion: USC (5th title)
- Edition: 15th
- Dates: June 19-20, 1936
- Host city: Chicago, Illinois
- Venue: Stagg Field
- Events: 16

Meet footage Jesse Owens wins 4 gold medals

The 1936 NCAA Track and Field Championships was the 15th NCAA track and field championship. The event was held at Stagg Field in Chicago, Illinois in June 1936. The University of Southern California won the team championship. Athletes from 32 universities and colleges participated in the event.

For the second consecutive year, Ohio State's Jesse Owens won championships in four individual events—the 100-meter sprint, the 200-meter sprint, the 220-yard low hurdles and the broad jump (now called the long jump). Owens accounted for more than half of Ohio State's points (40 of 73) in the team scoring. Owens also set a new world record in the 100-meter sprint at the meet.

California's Archie Williams set a world record (46.1) in the 400-meter heats; he won the final in 47.0. USC's Kenneth Carpenter won the discus throw with a toss of 173 feet (52.72 m), which was a new American record and surpassed Harald Andersson's official world record by more than a foot; however, it was inferior to new records by Andersson and Willy Schröder that were still pending official ratification. Javelin thrower Alton Terry of Hardin-Simmons also broke the American record in his specialty.

== Team scoring ==
1. University of Southern California - 103 1/3 points
2. Ohio State - 73 points
3. Indiana - 42 points
4. Stanford - 32 points
5. Michigan - 23 points
6. Wisconsin - 18 points
7. California - 17 points
8. Nebraska - 16 points
8. Rice - 16 points
10. Notre Dame - 14 points

== Track events ==
100-meter dash
1. Jesse Owens, Ohio State - 10.2 seconds (new world record)
2. Foy Draper, USC
3. Sam Stoller, Michigan
4. Adrian Talley, USC
5. Harvey Wallender, Texas
6. George Boone, USC

110-meter high hurdles
1. Forrest Towns, Georgia - 14.3 seconds
2. Dan Caldemeyer, Indiana
3. Sam Klopstock, Stanford
4. Roy Staley, USC
5. Dick Kearns, Colorado
6. Jack Kellner, Wisconsin

200-meter dash
1. Jesse Owens, Ohio State - 21.3 seconds
2. Harvey Wallender, Texas
3. Foy Draper, USC
4. Jack Weiershauser, Stanford
5. Herschel Neil, Northwest (Missouri) State Teachers
6. Clark Crane, USC

220-yard low hurdles
1. Jesse Owens, Ohio State - 23.1 seconds
2. Don Elser, Notre Dame
3. Ben Willis, Kentucky
4. Jack Patterson, Rice
5. Dick Kearns, Colorado
6. Leland Lafond, USC

400-meter hurdles
1. Bob Osgood, Michigan - 53.4 seconds
2. Herman Nelson, Oklahoma
3. Jack Patterson, Rice
4. Loren Benke, Washington State
5. Ben Stout, Ball (Ind.) State Teachers
6. Dell Fishback, California

400-meter run
1. Archie Williams, California - 47.0 seconds
2. Al Fitch, USC
3. Harold Smallwood, USC
4. Jack Weiershauser, Stanford
5. Ray Ellinwood, Chicago
6. James Cassin, USC

800-meter run
1. Charles Beetham, Ohio State - 1:53.0
2. Ross Bush, USC
3. Marmaduke Hobbs, Indiana
4. Joe McGrath, Notre Dame
5. George O'Brien, Ohio State
6. Louis Brothers, Rice

1500-meter run
1. Archie San Romani - Emporia (Kansas) State Teachers - 3:53.0 (new meeting record)
2. Chuck Fenske, Wisconsin
3. Don Lash, Indiana
4. Clayton Brailsford, Michigan
5. Ivan Mothershead, Virginia Polytechnic
6. Tom Sexton, Ohio State

5000-meter run
1. Don Lash, Indiana - 14:58.5 (new meeting record)
2. Tom Deckard, Indiana
3. Ken Waite, Michigan State
4. Jim Smith, Indiana
5. Paul Benner, Ohio State
6. Fred Lantz, USC

== Field events ==
Broad jump
1. Jesse Owens, Ohio State - 25 feet, 10 7/8 inches
2. Kermit King, Pittsburg (Kansas) State Teachers
3. George Boone, USC
4. Donald Skinner, USC
5. Clark Crane, USC
6. Richard Brunton, Illinois

High jump
1. Dave Albritton, Ohio State - 6 feet, 6 1/8 inches
1. Mel Walker, Ohio State - 6 feet, 6 1/8 inches
3. Al Threadgill, Temple
4. Gil Cruter, Colorado
4. Delos Thurber, USC
4. Jack Vickery, Texas

Hop, step and jump
1. Herschel Neil, Northwest Missouri Teacher - 48 feet, 5 1/8 inches (new meeting record)
2. Lloyd Cardwell, Nebraska
3. George Boone, USC
4. Ken Cole, Southern Illinois
5. Fran Dittrich, Michigan State
6. Kermit King, Pittsburg (Kansas) State Teachers

Pole vault
1. Earle Meadows, USC - 14 feet, 1 3/4 inches
1. William Sefton, USC - 14 feet, 1 3/4 inches
3. Albert Haller, Wisconsin
3. David Weichert, Rice
5. Loring Day, USC
5. John Hooker, USC

Discus throw
1. Kenneth Carpenter, USC - 173 feet (new American record; exceeded officially listed world record)
2. Phil Levy, Stanford
3. Paul Halleck, Ohio State
4. Jess Petty, Rice
5. Widmer Etchells, Michigan
6. John Townsend, Michigan

Javelin
1. Alton Terry, Hardin-Simmons - 226 feet, 2 3/4 inches (new American record)
2. Ward Cuff, Marquette
3. Jack Thornley, Utah
4. Don Johnson, Idaho
5. Tex Milner, USC
6. Lawrence Minsky, Iowa State

Shot put
1. James Reynolds, Stanford - 50 feet, 3 1/2 inches
2. Sam Francis, Nebraska
3. George Mackey, California
4. Irwin Rubow, Wisconsin
5. Don Elser, Notre Dame
6. Clarence Schleimer, USC

== See also ==
- NCAA Men's Outdoor Track and Field Championship
