= Greg Rice (runner) =

American long-distance runner

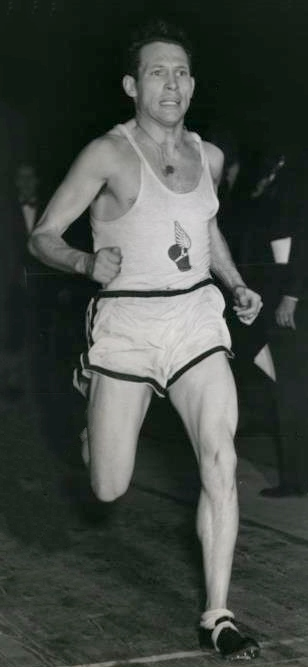
- Rice in 1943

Personal information
- Full name: Joseph Gregory Rice
- Born: January 3, 1916 Deer Lodge, Montana, U.S.
- Died: May 19, 1991 (aged 75) River Edge, New Jersey, U.S.
- Height: 5 ft 5 in (1.65 m)

Sport
- Sport: Running
- Event: Mile – 5000 meters
- College team: Notre Dame Fighting Irish
- Club: New York Athletic Club

Achievements and titles
- Personal bests: Mile – 4:13.0 (1938); 5000 m – 14:33.4 (1940)

Joseph Gregory Rice (January 3, 1916 – May 19, 1991) was an American long-distance runner. He was five times American champion in the 5000 m, set world indoor best times at two miles and three miles, and in 1940 received the Sullivan Award as the outstanding American amateur athlete. Like most athletes of his generation his athletics career was curtailed by the outbreak of World War II.

== Early life ==
Rice was born in Deer Lodge, Montana on January 3, 1916, later moving to Missoula, Montana. Whilst attending Missoula County High School, Rice won both the 800 and mile high-school state titles in his sophomore, junior and senior years. Greg Rice ran for Notre Dame university track team whilst studying there. He graduated in 1939. During this period he won two NCAA 2 miles titles in 1937 and 1939. Rice also won the inaugural NCAA cross-country title in 1939.

== Track and field career ==
At 5' 5" height but barrel-chested, Rice was nicknamed the "Little Dynamo". After leaving Notre Dame, Rice was affiliated with the New York Athletic Club

His achievements in 1940: American records at 2 and 3 miles; winning the national 5000 m title; and beating Finland's champion athlete Taisto Mäki meant he was the overwhelming winner of the Sullivan Award that year On the 28 February 1942 at the AAU indoor championships, Rice set a world indoor best time at three miles of 13:45.7, a time not bettered for 17 years.

On March 16, 1943, Rice set a world indoor best time for two miles of 8:51.0, a time not bettered for 9 years.

Overall, Rice was to set indoor best times on 8 occasions. At one point in his career, he was unbeaten for 65 races indoors and outdoors (55 alone indoors) and won 3 indoor national titles at 3 miles (1940–43).

On June 6, 1942, Rice set a new American outdoor record for 3 miles of 14:00.0. His final race was on June 20, 1943, where he came second to the legendary Swedish runner Gunder Hägg over 5000 m at the AAU Championships. His training for the race had been interrupted by time at sea following his enlisting in the United States Maritime Service six months earlier.

== Later life ==
After his service in the war, Rice worked as an accountant for the toy company Louis Marx & Company. He retired in 1984. Rice remained active within athletics serving as an official. He was married and had 4 sons and 4 daughters. He died in 1991 of a stroke.

== USA Championships ==
Rice was a very successful competitor at 5000 m in the USA National Track and Field Championships (then AAU Championships) between 1938 and 1943:

USA Championships
Year	5000m
1938	1st
1939	1st
1940	1st
1941	1st
1942	1st
1943	2nd

== Accolades and awards ==
- In 1940, Rice received the Sullivan Award as the outstanding American amateur athlete.
- In 1977, he was inducted into the United States Track and Field Hall of Fame
- In 1994, he was inducted into the Montana High School Association Hall of Fame.
- In 2005, he was inducted into the Millrose Games Hall of Fame (because of his four wins at 2 miles in the Millrose Games in 1939 and 1941–43).
